= 2001 Players Championship =

Tournament information
- Dates: March 22–26, 2001
- Location: Ponte Vedra Beach, Florida; 30.198°N 81.394°W
- Courses: TPC Sawgrass, Stadium Course
- Tour: PGA Tour

Statistics
- Par: 72
- Length: 7,093 yards (6,486 m)
- Field: 142 players, 75 after cut
- Cut: 147 (+3)
- Prize fund: $6.0 million
- Winner's share: $1.08 million

Champion
- (United States) Tiger Woods
- 274 (−14)

Location map
- Location in the United States Location in Florida

The 2001 Players Championship was a golf tournament in Florida on the PGA Tour, held March 22–26 at TPC Sawgrass in Ponte Vedra Beach, southeast of Jacksonville. It was the 28th Players Championship.

== Tournament summary ==
Tiger Woods won the first of his two Players Championships, one stroke ahead of runner-up Vijay Singh. Because of bad weather, the tournament was completed on Monday, March 26. In the final pairing with 54-hole leader Jerry Kelly, Woods played the final nine holes on Monday. He had also won the previous week, at Arnold Palmer's Bay Hill Invitational in Orlando.

Woods had won the previous three majors in 2000; he won the Masters Tournament two weeks later to hold all four major titles at once, the Tiger Slam, as well as this Players, the unofficial "fifth major." He won his second Players a dozen years later in 2013.

Tiger Woods (2001), Scottie Scheffler (2024), and Rory McIlroy (2025) are the only three players to ever win both a Players Championship and a Masters Tournament in the same calendar year. Woods was the third Players champion to win a major in the same calendar year, joining Jack Nicklaus (1978) and Hal Sutton (1983); it expanded to six with Martin Kaymer in 2014, Cameron Smith in 2022 and Scheffler in 2024.

Defending champion Sutton finished seven strokes back, in a tie for fifth place.

== Venue ==
This was the 20th Players Championship held at the TPC at Sawgrass Stadium Course and it remained at 7,093 yards (6,486 m).

== Field ==
1. Winners of PGA Tour co-sponsored or approved tournaments, whose victories are considered official, since the 2000 Players Championship

- Robert Allenby
- Billy Andrade
- Notah Begay III
- Mark Calcavecchia
- Stewart Cink
- Michael Clark II
- Chris DiMarco
- Joe Durant
- David Duval
- Ernie Els
- Brad Faxon
- Carlos Franco
- Jim Furyk
- John Huston
- Justin Leonard
- Davis Love III
- Steve Lowery
- Rocco Mediate
- Phil Mickelson
- Jesper Parnevik
- Dennis Paulson
- Loren Roberts
- Rory Sabbatini
- Tom Scherrer
- Vijay Singh
- Steve Stricker
- Hal Sutton
- David Toms
- Scott Verplank
- Duffy Waldorf
- Mike Weir
- Garrett Willis
- Tiger Woods

2. Those players among the top 125 finishers on the 2000 Official Money List

- Stephen Ames
- Stuart Appleby
- Tommy Armour III
- Woody Austin
- Paul Azinger
- Doug Barron
- Mark Brooks
- Olin Browne
- Bob Burns
- Tom Byrum
- Jim Carter
- Greg Chalmers
- Brandel Chamblee
- Russ Cochran
- John Cook
- Fred Couples
- Robert Damron
- Glen Day
- Jay Don Blake
- Doug Dunakey
- Scott Dunlap
- Joel Edwards
- Brad Elder
- Bob Estes
- Steve Flesch
- Harrison Frazar
- Robin Freeman
- Edward Fryatt
- Fred Funk
- Sergio García
- Brian Gay
- Brent Geiberger
- Bill Glasson
- Matt Gogel
- Mathew Goggin
- Paul Goydos
- Jimmy Green
- Dudley Hart
- J. P. Hayes
- Brian Henninger
- Tim Herron
- Glen Hnatiuk
- Scott Hoch
- Bradley Hughes
- Lee Janzen
- Brandt Jobe
- Steve Jones
- Pete Jordan
- Jonathan Kaye
- Jerry Kelly
- Skip Kendall
- Greg Kraft
- Neal Lancaster
- Franklin Langham
- Tom Lehman
- J. L. Lewis
- Frank Lickliter
- Andrew Magee
- Jeff Maggert
- Len Mattiace
- Billy Mayfair
- Blaine McCallister
- Scott McCarron
- Shaun Micheel
- Larry Mize
- Gary Nicklaus
- Greg Norman
- Joe Ogilvie
- Mark O'Meara
- Joe Ozaki
- Craig Parry
- Steve Pate
- Carl Paulson
- David Peoples
- Kenny Perry
- Nick Price
- Chris Riley
- Jeff Sluman
- Jerry Smith
- Craig Stadler
- Paul Stankowski
- David Sutherland
- Kevin Sutherland
- Esteban Toledo
- Kirk Triplett
- Bob Tway
- Jean van de Velde
- Grant Waite
- Mark Wiebe
- Jay Williamson

3. Winners of the Players Championship, Masters Tournament, U.S. Open, British Open, and PGA Championship in the last ten years (winners, 1990–1997), or last five years (winners, 1998- )

- Ben Crenshaw
- John Daly
- Nick Faldo
- Tom Kite
- Bernhard Langer
- Paul Lawrie
- Corey Pavin
- Ian Woosnam

4. Winners of the NEC World Series of Golf in the last ten years (winners, 1990–1997), or last three years (winner in 1998)

- Fulton Allem
- Tom Purtzer

5. Winners of the Tour Championship in the last three years, beginning with the 1998 winner

6. Winners of official money World Golf Championship events in the last three years (1998–2000)

- Darren Clarke

7. Any player(s), not otherwise eligible, among the top 50 leaders from the Official World Golf Ranking through the Bay Hill Invitational

- Thomas Bjørn
- Ángel Cabrera
- Michael Campbell
- Retief Goosen
- Pádraig Harrington
- Miguel Ángel Jiménez
- Colin Montgomerie
- José María Olazábal
- Eduardo Romero
- Lee Westwood

8. Any player(s), not otherwise eligible, who are among the top 10 money-winners from the 2001 Official Money List below 10th position through the Bay Hill Invitational

9. To complete a field of 144 players, those players, not otherwise eligible, from the 2001 Official Money List below 10th position through the Bay Hill Invitational, in order of their positions on the money list

10. The Players Championship Committee may invite a player(s), not otherwise eligible, who is a current inductee of the World Golf Hall of Fame. (Such player(s) would be added to the list.)

== Round summaries ==
=== First round ===
Thursday, March 22, 2001

| Place | Player | Score | To par |
|---|---|---|---|
| 1 | (United States) Paul Azinger | 66 | −6 |
| T2 | (United States) Scott Hoch | 67 | −5 |
| T2 | (United States) Jonathan Kaye | 67 | −5 |
| T2 | (Fiji) Vijay Singh | 67 | −5 |
| T5 | (Australia) Robert Allenby | 68 | −4 |
| T5 | (United States) Skip Kendall | 68 | −4 |
| T5 | (United States) Billy Mayfair | 68 | −4 |
| T8 | (United States) Jim Carter | 69 | −3 |
| T8 | (United States) Brad Elder | 69 | −3 |
| T8 | (United States) Jerry Kelly | 69 | −3 |
| T8 | (United States) Scott Verplank | 69 | −3 |

=== Second round ===
Friday, March 23, 2001

| Place | Player | Score | To par |
|---|---|---|---|
| 1 | (United States) Jerry Kelly | 69-66=135 | −9 |
| 2 | (United States) Paul Azinger | 66-70=136 | −8 |
| T3 | (United States) Scott Hoch | 67-70=137 | −7 |
| T3 | (United States) Kenny Perry | 71-66=137 | −7 |
| T3 | (Fiji) Vijay Singh | 67-70=137 | −7 |
| 6 | (United States) Jonathan Kaye | 67-72=139 | −5 |
| 7 | (United States) Billy Mayfair | 68-72=140 | −4 |
| T8 | (United States) Brad Elder | 69-72=141 | −3 |
| T8 | (United States) Fred Funk | 70-71=141 | −3 |
| T8 | (United States) J. P. Hayes | 72-69=141 | −3 |
| T8 | (Germany) Bernhard Langer | 73-68=141 | −3 |
| T8 | (United States) Phil Mickelson | 73-68=141 | −3 |
| T8 | (United States) Tiger Woods | 72-69=141 | −3 |

=== Third round ===
Saturday, March 24, 2001

| Place | Player | Score | To par |
|---|---|---|---|
| 1 | (United States) Jerry Kelly | 69-66-70=205 | −11 |
| T2 | (Fiji) Vijay Singh | 67-70-70=207 | −9 |
| T2 | (United States) Tiger Woods | 72-69-66=207 | −9 |
| 4 | (United States) Scott Hoch | 67-70-71=208 | −8 |
| 5 | (Germany) Bernhard Langer | 73-68-68=209 | −7 |
| T6 | (United States) Paul Azinger | 66-70-74=210 | −6 |
| T6 | (United States) Billy Mayfair | 68-72-70=210 | −6 |
| T8 | (United States) Kenny Perry | 71-66-74=211 | −5 |
| T8 | (United States) Hal Sutton | 72-71-68=211 | −5 |
| 10 | (New Zealand) Michael Campbell | 71-72-69=212 | −4 |

=== Final round ===
Sunday, March 25, 2001
Monday, March 26, 2001

Champion
(c) = past champion

| Place | Player | Score | To par | Money ($) |
|---|---|---|---|---|
| 1 | (United States) Tiger Woods | 72-69-66-67=274 | −14 | 1,080,000 |
| 2 | (Fiji) Vijay Singh | 67-70-70-68=275 | −13 | 648,000 |
| 3 | (Germany) Bernhard Langer | 73-68-68-67=276 | −12 | 408,000 |
| 4 | (United States) Jerry Kelly | 69-66-70-73=278 | −10 | 288,000 |
| T5 | (United States) Billy Mayfair | 68-72-70-71=281 | −7 | 228,000 |
| T5 | (United States) Hal Sutton (c) | 72-71-68-70=281 | −7 | 228,000 |
| T7 | (United States) Paul Azinger | 66-70-74-72=282 | −6 | 187,000 |
| T7 | (United States) Scott Hoch | 67-70-71-74=282 | −6 | 187,000 |
| T7 | (United States) Frank Lickliter | 72-72-70-68=282 | −6 | 187,000 |
| T10 | (United States) Joe Durant | 73-73-67-70=283 | −5 | 156,000 |
| T10 | (Zimbabwe) Nick Price (c) | 70-74-71-68=283 | −5 | 156,000 |

Leaderboard below the top 10
| Place | Player | Score | To par | Money ($) |
|---|---|---|---|---|
| T12 | (United States) Tom Lehman | 71-71-72-70=284 | −4 | 126,000 |
| T12 | (Spain) José María Olazábal | 71-76-68-69=284 | −4 | 126,000 |
| T12 | (United States) David Toms | 70-77-66-71=284 | −4 | 126,000 |
| T15 | (New Zealand) Michael Campbell | 72-71-69-73=285 | −3 | 102,000 |
| T15 | (United States) Scott Dunlap | 70-73-73-69=285 | −3 | 102,000 |
| T15 | (United States) Franklin Langham | 73-71-71-70=285 | −3 | 102,000 |
| T18 | (United States) Lee Janzen (c) | 77-67-69-73=286 | −2 | 84,000 |
| T18 | (United States) Jonathan Kaye | 67-72-76-71=286 | −2 | 84,000 |
| T18 | (United States) Kenny Perry | 71-66-74-75=286 | −2 | 84,000 |
| T21 | (Australia) Robert Allenby | 68-75-71-73=287 | −1 | 62,400 |
| T21 | (United States) Jim Furyk | 72-75-72-68=287 | −1 | 62,400 |
| T21 | (United States) J. P. Hayes | 72-69-76-70=287 | −1 | 62,400 |
| T21 | (United States) Tim Herron | 73-74-71-69=287 | −1 | 62,400 |
| T21 | (United States) Corey Pavin | 73-72-69-73=287 | −1 | 62,400 |
| T26 | (Argentina) Ángel Cabrera | 72-70-74-72=288 | E | 44,400 |
| T26 | (Northern Ireland) Darren Clarke | 75-70-72-71=288 | E | 44,400 |
| T26 | (United States) Brad Faxon | 72-74-73-69=288 | E | 44,400 |
| T26 | (United States) Skip Kendall | 68-78-69-73=288 | E | 44,400 |
| T26 | (Japan) Naomichi Ozaki | 77-68-72-71=288 | E | 44,400 |
| T31 | (United States) Dennis Paulson | 74-70-73-72=289 | +1 | 38,100 |
| T31 | (United States) Kirk Triplett | 72-71-76-70=289 | +1 | 38,100 |
| T33 | (Australia) Stuart Appleby | 74-73-75-68=290 | +2 | 31,028 |
| T33 | (United States) Fred Funk | 70-71-77-72=290 | +2 | 31,028 |
| T33 | (Republic of Ireland) Pádraig Harrington | 70-75-73-72=290 | +2 | 31,028 |
| T33 | (United States) Phil Mickelson | 73-68-72-77=290 | +2 | 31,028 |
| T33 | (Australia) Craig Parry | 71-73-76-70=290 | +2 | 31,028 |
| T33 | (United States) Jeff Sluman | 72-71-75-72=290 | +2 | 31,028 |
| T33 | (United States) Mark Wiebe | 73-73-69-75=290 | +2 | 31,028 |
| T40 | (United States) Steve Flesch | 70-73-76-72=291 | +3 | 24,000 |
| T40 | (United States) Brian Gay | 73-74-72-72=291 | +3 | 24,000 |
| T40 | (Scotland) Colin Montgomerie | 71-71-75-74=291 | +3 | 24,000 |
| T40 | (United States) Bob Tway | 72-73-74-72=291 | +3 | 24,000 |
| T44 | (United States) Billy Andrade | 72-73-74-73=292 | +4 | 18,140 |
| T44 | (United States) Tom Kite (c) | 70-73-75-74=292 | +4 | 18,140 |
| T44 | (United States) Scott McCarron | 71-75-77-69=292 | +4 | 18,140 |
| T44 | (United States) Paul Stankowski | 72-74-73-73=292 | +4 | 18,140 |
| T44 | (United States) Scott Verplank | 69-75-72-76=292 | +4 | 18,140 |
| T44 | (Canada) Mike Weir | 77-69-72-74=292 | +4 | 18,140 |
| T50 | (United States) Jay Don Blake | 74-73-73-73=293 | +5 | 14,472 |
| T50 | (United States) Jim Carter | 69-73-75-76=293 | +5 | 14,472 |
| T50 | (England) Nick Faldo | 73-73-75-72=293 | +5 | 14,472 |
| T50 | (Spain) Sergio García | 73-74-74-72=293 | +5 | 14,472 |
| T50 | (United States) Steve Jones | 72-71-72-78=293 | +5 | 14,472 |
| T55 | (United States) Tom Byrum | 73-71-75-75=294 | +6 | 13,680 |
| T55 | (United States) John Cook | 71-72-75-76=294 | +6 | 13,680 |
| T55 | (United States) Chris DiMarco | 74-73-74-73=294 | +6 | 13,680 |
| T58 | (Australia) Greg Chalmers | 71-73-72-79=295 | +7 | 13,080 |
| T58 | (United States) Fred Couples (c) | 71-75-70-79=295 | +7 | 13,080 |
| T58 | (Canada) Glen Hnatiuk | 74-70-71-80=295 | +7 | 13,080 |
| T58 | (United States) Steve Pate | 72-72-76-75=295 | +7 | 13,080 |
| T58 | (United States) Chris Riley | 71-75-73-76=295 | +7 | 13,080 |
| T58 | (United States) Kevin Sutherland | 71-74-73-77=295 | +7 | 13,080 |
| T58 | (United States) Jay Williamson | 78-69-77-71=295 | +7 | 13,080 |
| T65 | (United States) Mark Brooks | 71-74-76-76=297 | +9 | 12,480 |
| T65 | (United States) Greg Kraft | 73-71-72-81=297 | +9 | 12,480 |
| T65 | (United States) Rocco Mediate | 73-73-75-76=297 | +9 | 12,480 |
| T68 | (United States) Paul Goydos | 73-74-76-75=298 | +10 | 12,180 |
| T68 | (United States) Carl Paulson | 74-73-76-75=298 | +10 | 12,180 |
| T70 | (United States) Brent Geiberger | 72-75-82-70=299 | +11 | 11,880 |
| T70 | (Australia) Mathew Goggin | 72-75-72-80=299 | +11 | 11,880 |
| T70 | (Wales) Ian Woosnam | 73-73-81-72=299 | +11 | 11,880 |
| T73 | (United States) Brad Elder | 69-72-81-78=300 | +12 | 11,520 |
| T73 | (United States) Robin Freeman | 73-72-79-76=300 | +12 | 11,520 |
| T73 | (United States) J. L. Lewis | 73-72-78-77=300 | +12 | 11,520 |
| CUT | (United States) Michael Clark II | 73-75=148 | +4 | |
| CUT | (United States) Robert Damron | 76-72=148 | +4 | |
| CUT | (United States) Dudley Hart | 70-78=148 | +4 | |
| CUT | (Australia) Bradley Hughes | 74-74=148 | +4 | |
| CUT | (United States) Neal Lancaster | 76-72=148 | +4 | |
| CUT | (United States) Davis Love III (c) | 72-76=148 | +4 | |
| CUT | (United States) Steve Stricker | 74-74=148 | +4 | |
| CUT | (France) Jean van de Velde | 75-73=148 | +4 | |
| CUT | (United States) Duffy Waldorf | 77-71=148 | +4 | |
| CUT | (England) Lee Westwood | 73-75=148 | +4 | |
| CUT | (Paraguay) Carlos Franco | 73-76=149 | +5 | |
| CUT | (United States) Matt Gogel | 74-75=149 | +5 | |
| CUT | (United States) Brian Henninger | 71-78=149 | +5 | |
| CUT | (Australia) Greg Norman (c) | 75-74=149 | +5 | |
| CUT | (Sweden) Jesper Parnevik | 70-79=149 | +5 | |
| CUT | (United States) David Peoples | 71-78=149 | +5 | |
| CUT | (United States) Brandel Chamblee | 75-75=150 | +6 | |
| CUT | (United States) Bob Estes | 72-78=150 | +6 | |
| CUT | (Spain) Miguel Ángel Jiménez | 75-75=150 | +6 | |
| CUT | (United States) Justin Leonard (c) | 74-76=150 | +6 | |
| CUT | (United States) Jeff Maggert | 70-80=150 | +6 | |
| CUT | (United States) Tom Purtzer | 71-79=150 | +6 | |
| CUT | (United States) Tom Scherrer | 76-74=150 | +6 | |
| CUT | (South Africa) Fulton Allem | 74-77=151 | +7 | |
| CUT | (United States) Notah Begay III | 79-72=151 | +7 | |
| CUT | (United States) Mark Calcavecchia | 74-77=151 | +7 | |
| CUT | (United States) John Daly | 73-78=151 | +7 | |
| CUT | (United States) Doug Dunakey | 75-76=151 | +7 | |
| CUT | (South Africa) Ernie Els | 76-75=151 | +7 | |
| CUT | (England) Ed Fryatt | 74-77=151 | +7 | |
| CUT | (United States) Steve Lowery | 73-78=151 | +7 | |
| CUT | (United States) Blaine McCallister | 77-74=151 | +7 | |
| CUT | (Mexico) Esteban Toledo | 74-77=151 | +7 | |
| CUT | (United States) Doug Barron | 77-75=152 | +8 | |
| CUT | (United States) Len Mattiace | 80-72=152 | +8 | |
| CUT | (United States) Shaun Micheel | 73-79=152 | +8 | |
| CUT | (United States) Joe Ogilvie | 72-80=152 | +8 | |
| CUT | (United States) Mark O'Meara | 78-74=152 | +8 | |
| CUT | (United States) Garrett Willis | 74-78=152 | +8 | |
| CUT | (Trinidad and Tobago) Stephen Ames | 78-75=153 | +9 | |
| CUT | (United States) Harrison Frazar | 79-74=153 | +9 | |
| CUT | (United States) Brandt Jobe | 76-77=153 | +9 | |
| CUT | (Scotland) Paul Lawrie | 75-78=153 | +9 | |
| CUT | (United States) Loren Roberts | 76-77=153 | +9 | |
| CUT | (United States) Craig Stadler | 78-75=153 | +9 | |
| CUT | (New Zealand) Grant Waite | 75-78=153 | +9 | |
| CUT | (United States) Russ Cochran | 74-80=154 | +10 | |
| CUT | (United States) Glen Day | 78-76=154 | +10 | |
| CUT | (United States) Jimmy Green | 76-78=154 | +10 | |
| CUT | (United States) John Huston | 75-79=154 | +10 | |
| CUT | (United States) Andrew Magee | 74-80=154 | +10 | |
| CUT | (Denmark) Thomas Bjørn | 76-79=155 | +11 | |
| CUT | (United States) Olin Browne | 76-79=155 | +11 | |
| CUT | (United States) Jerry Smith | 77-78=155 | +11 | |
| CUT | (United States) Ben Crenshaw | 78-78=156 | +12 | |
| CUT | (South Africa) Retief Goosen | 79-77=156 | +12 | |
| CUT | (United States) Gary Nicklaus | 79-77=156 | +12 | |
| CUT | (United States) Woody Austin | 78-79=157 | +13 | |
| CUT | (United States) Stewart Cink | 78-79=157 | +13 | |
| CUT | (United States) Pete Jordan | 76-81=157 | +13 | |
| CUT | (United States) Larry Mize | 76-81=157 | +13 | |
| CUT | (Argentina) Eduardo Romero | 78-79=157 | +13 | |
| CUT | (South Africa) Rory Sabbatini | 74-84=158 | +14 | |
| CUT | (United States) Bob Burns | 76-83=159 | +15 | |
| CUT | (United States) Bill Glasson | 77-86=163 | +19 | |
| WD | (United States) Tommy Armour III | | | |
| DQ | (United States) Joel Edwards | 72 | E | |

==== Scorecard ====
Final round

| Hole | 1 | 2 | 3 | 4 | 5 | 6 | 7 | 8 | 9 | 10 | 11 | 12 | 13 | 14 | 15 | 16 | 17 | 18 |
|---|---|---|---|---|---|---|---|---|---|---|---|---|---|---|---|---|---|---|
| Par | 4 | 5 | 3 | 4 | 4 | 4 | 4 | 3 | 5 | 4 | 5 | 4 | 3 | 4 | 4 | 5 | 3 | 4 |
| (United States) Woods | −10 | −12 | −12 | −12 | −12 | −12 | −11 | −11 | −12 | −13 | −13 | −14 | −14 | −14 | −14 | −15 | −15 | −14 |
| (Fiji) Singh | −9 | −10 | −9 | −10 | −11 | −11 | −12 | −12 | −11 | −11 | −12 | −12 | −13 | −10 | −10 | −12 | −13 | −13 |
| (Germany) Langer | −8 | −8 | −8 | −8 | −9 | −9 | −9 | −9 | −10 | −9 | −10 | −11 | −10 | −11 | −10 | −11 | −11 | −12 |
| (United States) Kelly | −11 | −12 | −12 | −11 | −11 | −11 | −11 | −11 | −11 | −11 | −11 | −11 | −11 | −11 | −12 | −12 | −12 | −10 |
| (United States) Mayfair | −7 | −8 | −8 | −9 | −9 | −9 | −9 | −9 | −8 | −7 | −8 | −8 | −8 | −8 | −7 | −8 | −8 | −7 |
| (United States) Sutton | −4 | −4 | −4 | −6 | −6 | −6 | −5 | −5 | −5 | −5 | −4 | −5 | −5 | −5 | −5 | −6 | −7 | −7 |
| (United States) Azinger | −6 | −6 | −5 | −5 | −4 | −4 | −4 | −4 | −4 | −5 | −5 | −4 | −5 | −6 | −5 | −6 | −6 | −6 |
| (United States) Hoch | −8 | −9 | −8 | −8 | −8 | −8 | −8 | −7 | −7 | −7 | −7 | −7 | −7 | −6 | −5 | −6 | −6 | −6 |
| (United States) Lickliter | −2 | −3 | −4 | −4 | −3 | −3 | −4 | −5 | −5 | −6 | −5 | −5 | −6 | −5 | −5 | −6 | −6 | −6 |

Cumulative tournament scores, relative to par

| Eagle | Birdie | Bogey | Double Bogey | Triple Bogey+ |
