= 1996 Players Championship =

Tournament information
- Dates: March 28–31, 1996
- Location: Ponte Vedra Beach, Florida; 30.198°N 81.394°W
- Courses: TPC Sawgrass, Stadium Course
- Tour: PGA Tour

Statistics
- Par: 72
- Length: 6,896 yards (6,306 m)
- Field: 146 players, 77 after cut
- Cut: 143 (−1)
- Prize fund: $3.5 million
- Winner's share: $630,000

Champion
- (United States) Fred Couples
- 270 (−18)

Location map
- Location in the United States Location in Florida

The 1996 Players Championship was a golf tournament in Florida on the PGA Tour, held March 28–31 at TPC Sawgrass in Ponte Vedra Beach, southeast of Jacksonville. It was the 23rd Players Championship.

== Tournament summary ==
Fred Couples shot a final round 64 to win his second Players, four strokes ahead of runners-up Colin Montgomerie and Tommy Tolles, the 54-hole leader. Couples' previous win was twelve years earlier in 1984.

Defending champion Lee Janzen finished thirteen strokes back, in a tie for 46th place.

== Venue ==
This was the fifteenth Players Championship held at the TPC at Sawgrass Stadium Course, and it remained at 6,896 yards (6,306 m).

== Eligibility requirements ==
The top 125 PGA Tour members from the final 1995 Official Money List.

Greg Norman, Billy Mayfair, Lee Janzen, Corey Pavin, Steve Elkington, Davis Love III, Peter Jacobsen, Jim Gallagher Jr., Vijay Singh, Mark O'Meara, David Duval, Payne Stewart, Mark Calcavecchia, Ernie Els, Tom Lehman, Jay Haas, Scott Simpson, Scott Hoch, Nick Faldo, Bob Tway, Kenny Perry, Justin Leonard, Ben Crenshaw, Woody Austin, Brad Bryant, Fred Funk, Loren Roberts, Phil Mickelson, Kirk Triplett, Nick Price, Jeff Sluman, Hal Sutton, Jim Furyk, Jeff Maggert, Duffy Waldorf, Steve Lowery, Ted Tryba, Steve Stricker, Bob Estes, John Morse, Bill Glasson, Jim McGovern, Mark McCumber, Mark Brooks, Curtis Strange, David Frost, Lennie Clements, Mike Heinen, Colin Montgomerie, Jay Don Blake, Scott Verplank, Brett Ogle, John Daly, Tom Watson, Bob Lohr, Gene Sauers, Mike Hulbert, Guy Boros, Fred Couples, John Huston, Craig Parry, Joe Ozaki, Larry Mize, Robin Freeman, Billy Andrade, Bruce Lietzke, Andrew Magee, Gil Morgan, John Adams, Brian Claar, Grant Waite, Blaine McCallister, Nolan Henke, Steve Jones, Jay Delsing, Doug Martin, Don Pooley, David Edwards, Jesper Parnevik, Michael Bradley, Brandel Chamblee, Dillard Pruitt, Robert Gamez, Joey Sindelar, Dan Forsman, Jonathan Kaye, Hale Irwin, Lee Rinker, John Cook, Scott Gump, Paul Azinger, Neal Lancaster, Jim Carter, Charlie Rymer, Tom Kite, Curt Byrum, Ken Green, Kelly Gibson, Fuzzy Zoeller, Chip Beck, Mark Wiebe, Mike Sullivan, Brian Henninger, Bobby Wadkins, Tommy Tolles, Dan Pohl, Brian Kamm, Patrick Burke, John Mahaffey, Phil Blackmar, Ed Dougherty, David Ogrin, Dave Stockton Jr., John Wilson, Rick Fehr, Joe Acosta Jr., Scott McCarron, Paul Goydos, Keith Fergus

All winners of PGA Tour events awarding official money and official victory status in the preceding 12 months, concluding with the Freeport-McDermott Classic and dating from the 1995 Players Championship.

Craig Stadler

Winners in the last 10 calendar years of The Players Championship, Masters Tournament, U.S. Open, PGA Championship, and NEC World Series of Golf.

Sandy Lyle, Jeff Sluman, Ian Woosnam, Larry Nelson, Mike Reid, Tom Purtzer, Fulton Allem

British Open winners since 1990.

Ian Baker-Finch

Six players, not otherwise eligible, designated by The Players Championship Committee as "special selections."

Costantino Rocca, Masashi Ozaki, Sam Torrance, Robert Allenby, Michael Campbell, Frank Nobilo

Any players, not otherwise eligible, who are among the top-10 money-winners from the 1996 Official Money List through the Freeport-McDermott Classic.

Tim Herron

To complete a field of 144 players, those players in order, not otherwise eligible, from the 1996 Official Money List through the Freeport-McDermott Classic.

Omar Uresti, Tom Scherrer, Jerry Kelly, Marco Dawson, Joel Edwards, Rocco Mediate, Brad Fabel, Glen Day, David Toms, Mike Brisky, Lanny Wadkins

== Round summaries ==
=== First round ===
Thursday, March 28, 1996
Friday, March 29, 1996

Place	Player	Score	To par
T1	(United States) Justin Leonard	65	−7
T1	(United States) Kenny Perry	65	−7
T3	(United States) Fred Couples	66	−6
T3	(Australia) Craig Parry	66	−6
T3	(United States) Fuzzy Zoeller	66	−6
T6	(United States) Mark Calcavecchia	67	−5
T6	(South Africa) David Frost	67	−5
T6	(United States) Hale Irwin	67	−5
T6	(United States) Corey Pavin	67	−5
T6	(United States) Kirk Triplett	67	−5

=== Second round ===
Friday, March 29, 1996

Place	Player	Score	To par
1	(United States) Tommy Tolles	69-64=133	−11
T2	(United States) Mark Calcavecchia	67-68=135	−9
T2	(United States) Justin Leonard	65-70=135	−9
T4	(United States) David Duval	70-66=136	−8
T4	(United States) Jay Haas	68-68=136	−8
T4	(United States) Kenny Perry	65-71=136	−8
T4	(United States) Fuzzy Zoeller	66-70=136	−8
T8	(United States) Chip Beck	68-69=137	−7
T8	(South Africa) David Frost	67-70=137	−7
T8	(United States) Larry Mize	70-67=137	−7

=== Third round ===
Saturday, March 30, 1996

Place	Player	Score	To par
1	(United States) Tommy Tolles	69-64-69=202	−14
2	(United States) David Duval	70-66-68=204	−12
T3	(United States) Jay Haas	68-68-69=205	−11
T3	(United States) Michael Bradley	72-67-66=205	−11
T5	(United States) Fred Couples	66-72-68=206	−10
T5	(South Africa) Ernie Els	71-70-65=206	−10
T5	(United States) Fred Funk	70-69-67=206	−10
T5	(United States) Scott Gump	70-68-68=206	−10
T5	(Scotland) Colin Montgomerie	71-69-66=206	−10
T5	(United States) Kenny Perry	65-71-70=206	−10
T5	(Fiji) Vijay Singh	70-68-68=206	−10

=== Final round ===
Sunday, March 31, 1996

Champion
(c) = past champion

Place	Player	Score	To par	Money ($)
1	(United States) Fred Couples (c)	66-72-68-64=270	−18	630,000
T2	(Scotland) Colin Montgomerie	71-69-66-68=274	−14	308,000
T2	(United States) Tommy Tolles	69-64-69-72=274	−14	308,000
T4	(United States) David Duval	70-66-68-71=275	−13	137,812
T4	(United States) Rocco Mediate	74-69-66-66=275	−13	137,812
T4	(United States) Kenny Perry	65-71-70-69=275	−13	137,812
T4	(United States) Fuzzy Zoeller	66-70-72-67=275	−13	137,812
T8	(South Africa) Ernie Els	71-70-65-70=276	−12	94,500
T8	(United States) Jay Haas	68-68-69-71=276	−12	94,500
T8	(United States) Tom Lehman	70-72-67-67=276	−12	94,500
T8	(Fiji) Vijay Singh	70-68-68-70=276	−12	94,500
T8	(New Zealand) Grant Waite	68-72-68-68=276	−12	94,500

Leaderboard below the top 10
Place	Player	Score	To par	Money ($)
T13	(United States) Fred Funk	70-69-67-71=277	−11	65,625
T13	(United States) Jim Furyk	70-70-67-70=277	−11	65,625
T13	(United States) Larry Mize	70-67-71-69=277	−11	65,625
T13	(United States) Gil Morgan	70-69-69-69=277	−11	65,625
T17	(United States) Patrick Burke	72-71-69-66=278	−10	54,250
T17	(South Africa) David Frost	67-70-72-69=278	−10	54,250
T19	(United States) Michael Bradley	72-67-66-74=279	−9	35,735
T19	(United States) John Daly	68-70-69-72=279	−9	35,735
T19	(United States) Joel Edwards	71-67-71-70=279	−9	35,735
T19	(Australia) Steve Elkington (c)	68-73-68-70=279	−9	35,735
T19	(Australia) Wayne Grady	72-69-68-70=279	−9	35,735
T19	(United States) Scott Gump	70-68-68-73=279	−9	35,735
T19	(United States) Nolan Henke	71-68-68-72=279	−9	35,735
T19	(United States) Tim Herron	69-73-68-69=279	−9	35,735
T19	(United States) Scott Hoch	71-70-70-68=279	−9	35,735
T19	(United States) Kirk Triplett	67-72-73-67=279	−9	35,735
T29	(United States) Mark Calcavecchia	67-68-75-70=280	−8	23,275
T29	(United States) Robert Gamez	68-73-70-69=280	−8	23,275
T29	(United States) Mark O'Meara	73-69-69-69=280	−8	23,275
T29	(Japan) Masashi Ozaki	71-69-69-71=280	−8	23,275
T33	(United States) John Adams	71-69-71-70=281	−7	17,718
T33	(United States) Jay Don Blake	74-68-68-71=281	−7	17,718
T33	(United States) Jim Carter	70-72-66-73=281	−7	17,718
T33	(United States) Marco Dawson	72-71-69-69=281	−7	17,718
T33	(United States) Steve Jones	70-69-69-73=281	−7	17,718
T33	(United States) Phil Mickelson	71-72-64-74=281	−7	17,718
T33	(United States) Loren Roberts	73-70-70-68=281	−7	17,718
T33	(United States) Tom Watson	72-68-69-72=281	−7	17,718
T41	(United States) Blaine McCallister	72-70-66-74=282	−6	12,950
T41	(United States) Jeff Sluman	68-72-72-70=282	−6	12,950
T41	(United States) Craig Stadler	73-70-71-68=282	−6	12,950
T41	(United States) Payne Stewart	73-70-68-71=282	−6	12,950
T41	(United States) Bobby Wadkins	71-70-68-73=282	−6	12,950
T46	(United States) Hale Irwin	67-73-69-74=283	−5	9,360
T46	(United States) Lee Janzen (c)	70-71-70-72=283	−5	9,360
T46	(United States) Davis Love III (c)	69-70-72-72=283	−5	9,360
T46	(United States) Steve Lowery	73-70-68-72=283	−5	9,360
T46	(United States) Corey Pavin	67-71-76-69=283	−5	9,360
T46	(Zimbabwe) Nick Price (c)	70-69-73-71=283	−5	9,360
T46	(United States) Dillard Pruitt	71-71-71-70=283	−5	9,360
T53	(United States) Guy Boros	69-72-70-73=284	−4	7,990
T53	(United States) Neal Lancaster	73-70-69-72=284	−4	7,990
T53	(United States) Jeff Maggert	70-70-77-67=284	−4	7,990
T53	(Sweden) Jesper Parnevik	69-70-72-73=284	−4	7,990
T53	(Australia) Craig Parry	66-74-72-72=284	−4	7,990
T53	(United States) Gene Sauers	69-72-72-71=284	−4	7,990
T53	(United States) Hal Sutton (c)	72-69-73-70=284	−4	7,990
T60	(United States) Chip Beck	68-69-76-72=285	−3	7,665
T60	(New Zealand) Frank Nobilo	68-72-72-73=285	−3	7,665
T62	(United States) Larry Nelson	71-69-73-73=286	−2	7,490
T62	(United States) Dan Pohl	72-70-73-71=286	−2	7,490
T62	(United States) Tom Purtzer	74-69-72-71=286	−2	7,490
T65	(United States) Justin Leonard	65-70-80-72=287	−1	7,315
T65	(United States) Mike Reid	70-73-72-72=287	−1	7,315
T67	(United States) Woody Austin	72-71-72-73=288	E	7,105
T67	(United States) Brian Kamm	68-74-71-75=288	E	7,105
T67	(United States) Doug Martin	69-71-76-72=288	E	7,105
T67	(United States) Don Pooley	69-73-74-72=288	E	7,105
T71	(New Zealand) Michael Campbell	70-73-69-77=289	+1	6,895
T71	(United States) Mike Hulbert	73-70-73-73=289	+1	6,895
T73	(United States) Ben Crenshaw	70-73-71-76=290	+2	6,685
T73	(United States) Jim Gallagher Jr.	71-70-76-73=290	+2	6,685
T73	(United States) Ken Green	71-71-74-74=290	+2	6,685
T73	(United States) John Morse	68-74-74-74=290	+2	6,685
77	(United States) Mark McCumber (c)	69-74-71-79=293	+5	6,510
CUT	(South Africa) Fulton Allem	73-71=144	E	
CUT	(United States) Paul Azinger	73-71=144	E	
CUT	(United States) Mark Brooks	69-75=144	E	
CUT	(United States) Curt Byrum	72-72=144	E	
CUT	(United States) Brian Claar	72-72=144	E	
CUT	(United States) Lennie Clements	75-69=144	E	
CUT	(United States) John Cook	73-71=144	E	
CUT	(United States) Dan Forsman	72-72=144	E	
CUT	(United States) Bill Glasson	72-72=144	E	
CUT	(United States) Peter Jacobsen	73-71=144	E	
CUT	(United States) Tom Kite (c)	71-73=144	E	
CUT	(United States) David Ogrin	74-70=144	E	
CUT	(Italy) Costantino Rocca	73-71=144	E	
CUT	(United States) Tom Scherrer	70-74=144	E	
CUT	(United States) Duffy Waldorf	68-76=144	E	
CUT	(United States) John Wilson	73-71=144	E	
CUT	(Wales) Ian Woosnam	72-72=144	E	
CUT	(United States) David Edwards	70-75=145	+1	
CUT	(United States) Bob Estes	71-74=145	+1	
CUT	(England) Nick Faldo	70-75=145	+1	
CUT	(United States) Mike Heinen	74-71=145	+1	
CUT	(United States) Bruce Lietzke	71-74=145	+1	
CUT	(United States) Andrew Magee	76-69=145	+1	
CUT	(United States) Dave Stockton Jr.	69-76=145	+1	
CUT	(United States) David Toms	73-72=145	+1	
CUT	(Australia) Robert Allenby	75-71=146	+2	
CUT	(United States) Billy Andrade	74-72=146	+2	
CUT	(United States) Glen Day	74-72=146	+2	
CUT	(United States) Jay Delsing	71-75=146	+2	
CUT	(United States) John Huston	72-74=146	+2	
CUT	(Scotland) Sandy Lyle (c)	76-70=146	+2	
CUT	(United States) John Mahaffey (c)	71-75=146	+2	
CUT	(Australia) Greg Norman (c)	73-73=146	+2	
CUT	(Japan) Naomichi Ozaki	72-74=146	+2	
CUT	(United States) Scott Simpson	70-76=146	+2	
CUT	(United States) Joey Sindelar	76-70=146	+2	
CUT	(United States) Bob Tway	72-74=146	+2	
CUT	(United States) Lanny Wadkins (c)	71-75=146	+2	
CUT	(United States) Joe Acosta Jr.	73-74=147	+3	
CUT	(United States) Brad Bryant	76-71=147	+3	
CUT	(United States) Robin Freeman	79-68=147	+3	
CUT	(United States) Bob Lohr	76-71=147	+3	
CUT	(United States) Charlie Rymer	75-72=147	+3	
CUT	(United States) Steve Stricker	75-72=147	+3	
CUT	(United States) Brandel Chamblee	73-75=148	+4	
CUT	(United States) Keith Fergus	73-75=148	+4	
CUT	(United States) Jerry Kelly	74-74=148	+4	
CUT	(United States) Omar Uresti	70-78=148	+4	
CUT	(United States) Mike Standly	72-77=149	+5	
CUT	(United States) Curtis Strange	75-74=149	+5	
CUT	(United States) Mike Sullivan	73-76=149	+5	
CUT	(Australia) Ian Baker-Finch	73-77=150	+6	
CUT	(United States) Brad Fabel	75-75=150	+6	
CUT	(United States) Kelly Gibson	80-70=150	+6	
CUT	(United States) Paul Goydos	75-75=150	+6	
CUT	(Australia) Brett Ogle	76-74=150	+6	
CUT	(United States) Lee Rinker	74-76=150	+6	
CUT	(Scotland) Sam Torrance	74-76=150	+6	
CUT	(United States) Mike Brisky	72-79=151	+7	
CUT	(United States) Scott McCarron	75-76=151	+7	
CUT	(United States) Billy Mayfair	76-76=152	+8	
CUT	(United States) Mark Wiebe	76-76=152	+8	
CUT	(United States) Phil Blackmar	73-80=153	+9	
CUT	(United States) Rick Fehr	73-80=153	+9	
CUT	(United States) Brian Henninger	79-74=153	+9	
CUT	(United States) Jim McGovern	76-77=153	+9	
CUT	(United States) Ted Tryba	80-73=153	+9	
WD	(United States) Scott Verplank	78	+6	
WD	(United States) Ed Dougherty	81	+9	
