= Monterrey Open (golf) =

Buy.com Monterrey Open
Tournament information
- Location: San Pedro Garza García, Mexico
- Established: 1993
- Course: Club Campestre
- Par: 72
- Tour: Buy.com Tour
- Format: Stroke play
- Prize fund: US$450,000
- Month played: March
- Final year: 2001

Tournament record score
- Aggregate: 268 Briny Baird (2000)
- To par: −20 as above

Final champion
- (South Africa) Deane Pappas
- Location in Mexico Location in Nuevo León

The Monterrey Open was a golf tournament on the Buy.com Tour, formerly the Nike Tour, from 1993 to 2001. It was played at the Club Campestre in San Pedro Garza García, a suburb of Monterrey, Mexico.

The purse in 2001 was US$450,000, with $81,000 going to the winner.

== Winners ==
Year	Winner	Score	To par	Margin of victory	Runner(s)-up
Buy.com Monterrey Open
2001	(South Africa) Deane Pappas	271	−17	1 stroke	(United States) Keoke Cotner (United States) Tim Petrovic
2000	(United States) Briny Baird	268	−20	4 strokes	(Australia) Mark Hensby
Nike Monterrey Open
1999	(United States) Steve Gotsche	270	−18	2 strokes	(United States) Kelly Gibson
1998	(United States) Joe Ogilvie	274	−14	2 strokes	(United States) Jaxon Brigman (United States) John Elliott (United States) Robin Freeman (United States) Perry Moss (United States) Chris Riley (United States) John Wilson
1997	(United States) Mike Small	270	−18	1 stroke	(United States) Mark Carnevale (United States) Chris DiMarco (United States) Brian Kamm
1996	(United States) David Berganio Jr.	272	−16	1 stroke	(Mexico) Rafael Alarcón
1995	(Australia) Stuart Appleby	273	−15	Playoff	(Mexico) Rafael Alarcón
1994	(United States) Scott Gump	269	−19	1 stroke	(United States) Brian Henninger
1993	(United States) Olin Browne	276	−12	1 stroke	(United States) Lon Hinkle (United States) Stan Utley
