= John Maginnes =

American golfer and analyst (born 1968)

Personal information
- Nationality: United States
- Born: July 14, 1968 (age 58) Atlanta, Georgia, U.S.
- Height: 6 ft 0 in (1.83 m)
- Weight: 210 lb (95 kg; 15 st)

Career
- Sport: Golf
- College: East Carolina University
- Turned professional: 1991
- Former tours: PGA Tour; Nike Tour
- Professional wins: 3

Number of wins by tour
- Korn Ferry Tour: 3

Best results in major championships
- Masters Tournament: DNP
- PGA Championship: DNP
- U.S. Open: T28: 2003
- The Open Championship: DNP

John Maginnes (born July 14, 1968) is an American professional golfer who played on the PGA Tour and the Nike Tour and is currently a golf analyst with his own show on Sirius XM Radio.

== Career ==
In 1994, Maginnes joined the Nike Tour. The following year, he picked up his first win on tour at the Nike San Jose Open and also earned his PGA Tour card through qualifying school. In his rookie year on the PGA Tour he came close to winning the Buick Challenge but lost in a playoff to Michael Bradley. He finished 113th on the money list and retained his Tour card for the following year.

For the remainder of his career, however, he alternated between the PGA Tour and its developmental tour. In 1997, he didn't play well enough to retain his PGA Tour card so he split time between the PGA and Nationwide Tour in 1998. He secured a victory at the 1998 Nike Dakota Dunes Open. He finished fifth on the money list that year, earning him his PGA Tour card for 1999.

In 1999, he recorded four top-10 finishes en route to finishing 93rd on the money list, his best finish of his career. In 2000, he didn't do as well on PGA Tour and played on the Buy.com Tour in 2001 where he won the Buy.com Carolina Classic. In 2002, he went through qualifying school for the second time to earn his PGA Tour card for 2003. He didn't have a good year on Tour and had to go through qualifying school for the third time to retain his Tour card. He injured his elbow in 2004 and played on a medical exemption in 2005, his final year on Tour.

=== Broadcasting career ===
While injured in 2004, Maginnes began to work as an on course commentator for the USA Network. In 2005, he began to work on XM Radio. He has worked for USA Network, Golf Channel, ESPN Digital, Sirius XM and many others. He co-hosts Katrek and Maginnes on Tap on SiriusXM Radio weeknights in the evening drive slot. The show previously known as Maginnes on Tap has aired since early 2011. Most recently, Maginnes has worked on PGA Tour Live primarily as an on-course commentator although he is occasionally utilized in the studio.

== Professional wins (3) ==
=== Buy.com Tour wins (3) ===
No.	Date	Tournament	Winning score	Margin of victory	Runner(s)-up
1	Feb 26, 1995	Nike San Jose Open	−11 (69-72-68-68=277)	3 strokes	(United States) Larry Silveira
2	Aug 2, 1998	Nike Dakota Dunes Open	−14 (62-68-73-71=274)	Playoff	(United States) Ryan Howison, (United States) Sean Murphy
3	May 6, 2001	Buy.com Carolina Classic	−15 (68-65-66-70=269)	2 strokes	(Japan) Ryuji Imada

Buy.com Tour playoff record (1–1)

No.	Year	Tournament	Opponent(s)	Result
1	1995	Nike Tour Championship	(United States) Allen Doyle	Lost to par on first extra hole
2	1998	Nike Dakota Dunes Open	(United States) Ryan Howison, (United States) Sean Murphy	Won with birdie on second extra hole

== Playoff record ==
PGA Tour playoff record (0–1)

No.	Year	Tournament	Opponents	Result
1	1996	Buick Challenge	(United States) Michael Bradley, (United States) Fred Funk, (United States) Davis Love III, (United States) Len Mattiace	Bradley won with birdie on first extra hole

== Results in major championships ==
Tournament	1995	1996	1997	1998	1999	2000	2001	2002	2003
U.S. Open	T71						CUT	T59	T28

Note: The only major Maginnes played was the U.S. Open.

Did not play

CUT = missed the half-way cut
"T" = tied

== See also ==
- 1995 PGA Tour Qualifying School graduates
- 1998 Nike Tour graduates
- 2002 PGA Tour Qualifying School graduates
- 2003 PGA Tour Qualifying School graduates
