= Price Cutter Charity Championship =

Golf tournament

Tournament information
- Location: Springfield, Missouri
- Established: 1990
- Course: Highland Springs Country Club
- Par: 72
- Length: 7,115 yards (6,506 m)
- Tour: Korn Ferry Tour
- Format: Stroke play
- Prize fund: $1,000,000
- Final year: 2025

Tournament record score
- Aggregate: 260 David Kocher (2022)
- To par: −28 as above

Final champion
- (United States) Chandler Blanchet

Location map
- Location in the United States Location in Missouri

The Price Cutter Charity Championship was a golf tournament on the Korn Ferry Tour. It was played at the Highland Springs Country Club in Springfield, Missouri, United States from the tour's inception in 1990 to 2025.

== Winners ==
Year	Winner	Score	To par	Margin of victory	Runner(s)-up
Price Cutter Charity Championship
2025	(United States) Chandler Blanchet	261	−27	3 strokes	(United States) Patrick Welch
2024	(United States) Matt McCarty	263	−25	3 strokes	(United States) Tommy Gainey
2023	(United States) Pierceson Coody	263	−25	2 strokes	(United States) Parker Coody (United States) Chandler Phillips (Canada) Ben Silverman (United States) Thomas Walsh
2022	(United States) David Kocher	260	−28	6 strokes	(United States) Taylor Montgomery (Argentina) Augusto Núñez (United States) Robby Shelton (Taiwan) Kevin Yu
2021	(United States) Dylan Wu	261	−27	2 strokes	(United States) Taylor Moore
2020	(United States) Max McGreevy	267	−21	1 stroke	(Mexico) José de Jesús Rodríguez
2019	(United States) Harry Higgs	266	−22	2 strokes	(United States) Andrew Svoboda (United States) Steve Wheatcroft
2018	(United States) Martin Trainer	263	−25	1 stroke	(Sweden) Henrik Norlander
2017	(Canada) Ben Silverman	263	−25	1 stroke	(United States) Talor Gooch
2016	(Canada) Mackenzie Hughes	264	−24	1 stroke	(United States) Richy Werenski
2015	(South Africa) Dawie van der Walt	265	−23	2 strokes	(United States) Smylie Kaufman
2014	(Australia) Cameron Percy	267	−21	1 stroke	(United States) Zac Blair (United States) Brandt Jobe (United States) Michael Kim (United States) Carlos Sainz Jr.
2013	(United States) Andrew Svoboda	266	−22	3 strokes	(Brazil) Fernando Mechereffe
2012	(United States) Chris Wilson	267	−21	Playoff	(United States) Scott Harrington
2011	(United States) Steve Friesen	262	−26	5 strokes	(Australia) Gavin Coles
2010	(United States) Hunter Haas	262	−26	6 strokes	(Sweden) Jonas Blixt (United States) Jamie Lovemark (United States) Jason Schultz
2009	(United States) Justin Bolli	267	−21	1 stroke	(United States) Chad Collins (United States) Derek Lamely
2008	(United States) Colt Knost	262	−26	4 strokes	(United States) Webb Simpson
2007	(United States) Tom Scherrer	262	−26	4 strokes	(United States) Franklin Langham
2006	(United States) Doug LaBelle II	261	−27	2 strokes	(Australia) Nick Flanagan
2005	(United States) Roger Tambellini	267	−21	1 stroke	(Australia) Steven Bowditch (United States) Troy Matteson (United States) David Peoples (United States) Vance Veazey
2004	(United States) Brad Ott	263	−25	1 stroke	(United States) Brandt Snedeker
2003	(United States) Tom Carter	267	−21	1 stroke	(United States) Doug LaBelle II (United States) Roland Thatcher
2002	(United States) Patrick Sheehan	269	−19	2 strokes	(United States) Eric Meeks (United States) Brian Wilson
Buy.com Ozarks Open
2001	(United States) Steve Haskins	131 (Note: Shortened to 36 holes due to rain.)	−13	1 stroke	(United States) Omar Uresti
2000	(United States) Pat Perez	270	−18	Playoff	(United States) Pat Bates (United States) Mike Heinen
Nike Ozarks Open
1999	(United States) Ryan Howison	270	−18	Playoff	(England) Ed Fryatt
1998	(Australia) Anthony Painter	267	−21	1 stroke	(United States) Scott Dunlap
1997	(United States) Chris DiMarco	204 (Note: Shortened to 54 holes due to weather.)	−12	1 stroke	(United States) Robin Freeman
1996	(United States) Stewart Cink	272	−16	Playoff	(United States) R. W. Eaks
1995	(United States) Mike Schuchart	271	−17	Playoff	(Australia) Stuart Appleby (United States) P. H. Horgan III
1994	(United States) Jerry Haas	272	−16	1 stroke	(United States) Frank Conner
1993	(United States) Tommy Tolles	271	−17	2 strokes	(United States) Bob Burns (United States) Bob May
Ben Hogan Greater Ozarks Open
1992	(United States) Lennie Clements	205	−11	Playoff	(United States) Tommy Tolles (United States) Ted Tryba
1991	(United States) Rick Dalpos	201	−15	4 strokes	(United States) Kevin Sutherland
1990	(United States) Jeff Cook	207	−9	Playoff	(United States) Olin Browne
