= Knoxville Open =

Golf tournament

Visit Knoxville Open
Tournament information
- Location: Knoxville, Tennessee
- Established: 1990
- Course: Holston Hills Country Club
- Par: 70
- Length: 7,028 yards (6,426 m)
- Tour: Korn Ferry Tour
- Format: Stroke play
- Prize fund: US$1,000,000
- Month played: May

Tournament record score
- Aggregate: 258 J. J. Spaun (2016)
- To par: −26 as above

Current champion
- (United States) Doc Redman

Final champion
- Location in the United States Location in Tennessee

The Visit Knoxville Open is a golf tournament on the Korn Ferry Tour. It is played annually at the Holston Hills Country Club in Knoxville, Tennessee, U.S. It is one of four original Tour events still played. The Knoxville News Sentinel was the title sponsor of the tournament from 2000 to 2017, before Visit Knoxville took over as title sponsor in August 2019.

The 2021 purse was $600,000, with $108,000 going to the winner.

== Winners ==
Year	Winner	Score	To par	Margin of victory	Runner(s)-up
Visit Knoxville Open
2026	(United States) Doc Redman	259	−25	Playoff	(United States) Hunter Eichhorn
2025	(Sweden) Pontus Nyholm	265	−19	Playoff	(United States) Johnny Keefer
2024	(United States) Harry Higgs	261	−19	Playoff	(United States) Frankie Capan III
2023	(United States) **Rico Hoey**	266	−14	1 stroke	(United States) Chase Seiffert (United States) **Norman Xiong**
2022	(United States) **Anders Albertson**	260	−20	1 stroke	(China) **Yuan Yechun**
2021	(United States) **Greyson Sigg**	260	−20	1 stroke	(Germany) **Stephan Jäger**
2020	Canceled due to the COVID-19 pandemic				
Knoxville Open
2019	(United States) **Robby Shelton**	269	−15	1 stroke	(United States) **Mark Anderson**
2018	(Germany) Stephan Jäger	268	−16	3 strokes	(South Korea) **Im Sung-jae**
News Sentinel Open
2017	(United States) **Talor Gooch**	266	−18	1 stroke	(United States) Jonathan Hodge
2016	(United States) **J. J. Spaun**	258	−26	1 stroke	(United States) Sam Ryder
2015	(United States) **Patton Kizzire**	264	−20	4 strokes	(Canada) Brad Fritsch (South Korea) **Kim Si-woo**
2014	(United States) Martin Piller	262	−22	2 strokes	(United States) Bronson Burgoon
2013	(United States) **Peter Malnati**	268	−16	1 stroke	(United States) Blayne Barber (United States) **Matt Bettencourt** (Argentina) **Miguel Ángel Carballo** (United States) James White
2012	(United States) **Darron Stiles** (2)	266	−18	1 stroke	(United States) D. J. Brigman (Australia) **Scott Gardiner** (United States) **Nicholas Thompson**
2011	(United States) Kirk Triplett	267	−21	2 strokes	(United States) Marco Dawson
Knoxville News Sentinel Open
2010	(United States) **Chris Kirk**	268	−20	2 strokes	(United States) Travis Bertoni
Knoxville Open
2009	(United States) **Kevin Johnson**	268	−20	Playoff	(New Zealand) Bradley Iles
2008	(Australia) **Jarrod Lyle**	269	−19	Playoff	(United States) Chris Kirk
2007	(United States) **Chez Reavie**	271	−17	3 strokes	(United States) Kyle McCarthy
2006	(United States) Hunter Haas (2)	269	−19	5 strokes	(England) Gary Christian (United States) Parker McLachlin
2005	(Australia) Kim Felton	277	−11	1 stroke	(United States) David Peoples
2004	(United States) **Hunter Haas**	275	−13	Playoff	(United States) Shane Bertsch (United States) **Justin Bolli**
2003	(United States) **Vaughn Taylor**	268	−20	Playoff	(United States) **Joe Ogilvie**
2002	(United States) **Darron Stiles**	272	−16	1 stroke	(Australia) **Aaron Baddeley** (United States) Steve Ford
Buy.com Knoxville Open
2001	(United States) **Heath Slocum**	265	−23	6 strokes	(United States) Keoke Cotner (United States) Joe Daley
2000	(United States) **J. J. Henry**	273	−15	1 stroke	(United States) **Tripp Isenhour** (United States) **Spike McRoy** (United States) Gene Sauers (United States) **Chris Smith**
Nike Knoxville Open
1999	(United States) **Jeff Gove**	277	−11	1 stroke	(United States) **Marco Dawson** (Canada) **Glen Hnatiuk** (United States) **Carl Paulson**
1998	(United States) **Robin Freeman**	270	−18	Playoff	(United States) Ryan Howison
1997	(United States) Dave Rummells	271	−17	2 strokes	(United States) Matt Gogel (Australia) Terry Price
1996	(United States) **Eric Johnson**	272	−16	2 strokes	(United States) Patrick Lee (United States) Matt Peterson
1995	(United States) **Tom Scherrer**	275	−13	Playoff	(United States) Mike Sposa
1994	(United States) Vic Wilk	275	−9	1 stroke	(United States) Bill Murchison
1993	(United States) Tim Conley	261	−23	7 strokes	(United States) Jerry Haas (United States) **Larry Silveira** (United States) Tommy Tolles (United States) Greg Whisman
Ben Hogan Knoxville Open
1992	(United States) **Brian Henninger**	200	−13	2 strokes	(United States) Curt Byrum (United States) Tom R. Shaw (Canada) Rick Todd
1991	(United States) **Frank Conner**	198	−15	1 stroke	(United States) Perry Arthur (United States) Paul Goydos
1990	(United States) **Jeff Maggert**	202	−11	Playoff	(United States) Greg Ladehoff

Bolded golfers graduated to the PGA Tour via the Korn Ferry Tour regular-season money list.
