= Joe Ogilvie =

American professional golfer (born 1974)

Personal information
- Full name: Norman Joseph Ogilvie
- Nationality: United States
- Born: April 8, 1974 (age 52) Lancaster, Ohio, U.S.
- Height: 5 ft 10 in (1.78 m)
- Weight: 165 lb (75 kg; 11.8 st)
- Spouse: Colleen
- Children: 3

Career
- Sport: Golf
- College: Duke University
- Turned professional: 1996
- Current tour: PGA Tour
- Former tour: Nationwide Tour
- Professional wins: 5
- Highest ranking: 55 (April 24, 2005)

Number of wins by tour
- PGA Tour: 1
- PGA Tour of Australasia: 1
- Korn Ferry Tour: 4

Best results in major championships
- Masters Tournament: T25: 2005
- PGA Championship: T17: 2005
- U.S. Open: T36: 2008
- The Open Championship: T25: 2001

Norman Joseph Ogilvie (born April 8, 1974) is an American former professional golfer.

== Career ==
Ogilvie was born in Lancaster, Ohio and graduated from Duke University.

He played on the PGA Tour and picked up his only win on tour at the U.S. Bank Championship in Milwaukee in 2007. He has also won four tournaments on the Nationwide Tour.

In 2014, Ogilvie announced his retirement from professional golf. He ended his career at the Wyndham Championship, his 399th PGA Tour start. He finished 77th, last of those who made the cut.

== Personal life ==
Ogilvie is a Republican.

Ogilvie owns an investment advisory firm.

== Professional wins (5) ==
=== PGA Tour wins (1) ===
No.	Date	Tournament	Winning score	Margin of victory	Runners-up
1	Jul 22, 2007	U.S. Bank Championship in Milwaukee	−14 (67-63-69-67=266)	4 strokes	(South Africa) Tim Clark, (United States) Tim Herron, (South Korea) Charlie Wi

PGA Tour playoff record (0–1)

No.	Year	Tournament	Opponents	Result
1	2005	The Honda Classic	(Republic of Ireland) Pádraig Harrington, (Fiji) Vijay Singh	Harrington won with par on second extra hole Ogilvie eliminated by par on first hole

=== Nationwide Tour wins (4) ===
No.	Date	Tournament	Winning score	Margin of victory	Runner(s)-up
1	Mar 22, 1998	Nike Monterrey Open	−14 (70-68-70-66=274)	2 strokes	(United States) Jaxon Brigman, (United States) John Elliott, (United States) Robin Freeman, (United States) Perry Moss, (United States) Chris Riley, (United States) John Wilson
2	Jun 28, 1998	Nike Greensboro Open	−14 (65-69-66-66=266)	4 strokes	(United States) Chris Zambri
3	Mar 2, 2003	Jacob's Creek Open^{1}	−5 (66-70-71-72=279)	1 stroke	(Australia) Shane Tait
4	Jul 13, 2003	Reese's Cup Classic	−10 (71-67-66-70=274)	3 strokes	(United States) Paul Claxton, (United States) Zach Johnson, (Australia) David McKenzie, (United States) Wes Short Jr.

^{1}Co-sanctioned by the PGA Tour of Australasia

Nationwide Tour playoff record (0–1)

No.	Year	Tournament	Opponent	Result
1	2003	Knoxville Open	(United States) Vaughn Taylor	Lost to birdie on first extra hole

== Results in major championships ==
Tournament	2000	2001	2002	2003	2004	2005	2006	2007	2008	2009
Masters Tournament						T25	CUT			
U.S. Open				CUT	T40	CUT			T36	
The Open Championship		T25				T34				
PGA Championship	T58				T49	T17		CUT		

Tournament	2010	2011	2012	2013	2014
Masters Tournament					
U.S. Open			72	CUT	CUT
The Open Championship					
PGA Championship					

Did not play

CUT = missed the half-way cut
"T" = tied

== Results in The Players Championship ==
Tournament	2001	2002	2003	2004	2005	2006	2007	2008	2009	2010	2011	2012
The Players Championship	CUT				T32	CUT	CUT	CUT	CUT			CUT

Did not play

CUT = missed the halfway cut
"T" indicates a tie for a place

== Results in World Golf Championships ==
Tournament	2005
Match Play	
Championship	50
Invitational	

Did not play

== See also ==
- 1998 Nike Tour graduates
- 1999 PGA Tour Qualifying School graduates
- 2003 Nationwide Tour graduates
- 2009 PGA Tour Qualifying School graduates
- List of golfers with most Web.com Tour wins
