= Carl Watts =

Carl Watts may refer to:

- Carl Eugene Watts, American serial killer
- Carl Watts (golfer), English golfer
