= Mike Sposa =

American golfer (born 1969)

Personal information
- Nationality: United States
- Born: June 5, 1969 (age 57) Teaneck, New Jersey, U.S.
- Height: 5 ft 11 in (1.80 m)
- Weight: 170 lb (77 kg; 12 st)

Career
- Sport: Golf
- College: University of Tennessee
- Turned professional: 1991
- Reinstated amateur: 2025
- Former tours: PGA Tour; Nationwide Tour; Golden Bear Tour
- Professional wins: 3

Number of wins by tour
- Korn Ferry Tour: 1
- Other: 2

Best results in major championships
- Masters Tournament: DNP
- PGA Championship: DNP
- U.S. Open: CUT: 1997, 2001
- The Open Championship: DNP

Mike Sposa (born June 5, 1969) is an American former professional golfer who regained his amateur status in January 2025.

== Amateur career ==
Sposa was born in Teaneck, New Jersey. He played college golf at the University of Tennessee where he was an All-American in 1990 and 1991 and won the SEC Championship in 1990. He played on the 1991 Walker Cup team where he teamed with David Duval for a pair of wins in foursomes.

== Professional career ==
Sposa played on the Nationwide Tour and PGA Tour from 1994 to 2007. On the Nationwide Tour, 1994–96, 1998, 2004–05, and 2007, his best finish was a win at the 1998 Nike Boise Open. On the PGA Tour, 1999–2003 and 2006, his best finish was T-4 at the 2002 Compaq Classic of New Orleans.

== Second amateur career ==
After having his amateur status reinstated in 2025, Sposa won the 2026 U.S. Senior Amateur.

== Professional wins (3) ==
=== Nike Tour wins (1) ===
No.	Date	Tournament	Winning score	Margin of victory	Runners-up
1	Sep 20, 1998	Nike Boise Open	−19 (63-71-66-65=265)	2 strokes	(United States) Notah Begay III, (United States) Dennis Paulson

Nike Tour playoff record (0–1)

No.	Year	Tournament	Opponent	Result
1	1995	Nike Knoxville Open	(United States) Tom Scherrer	Lost to birdie on first extra hole

=== Golden Bear Tour wins (2) ===
No.	Date	Tournament	Winning score	Margin of victory	Runner-up
1	Jul 10, 1997	Maxfli Open	−15 (67-69-65=201)	2 strokes	(United States) Chris Stutts
2	Aug 22, 1997	Nicklaus/Flick School Championship	−17 (65-70-67-69=271)	1 stroke	(United States) Chris Stutts

== Results in major championships ==
Tournament	1997	1998	1999	2000	2001
U.S. Open	CUT				CUT

Did not play

CUT = missed the halfway cut
Note: Sposa only played in the U.S. Open

== Results in The Players Championship ==
Tournament	2002
The Players Championship	CUT

CUT = missed the halfway cut

== U.S. national team appearances ==
Amateur

- Walker Cup: 1991 (winners)

== See also ==
- 1998 Nike Tour graduates
- 2000 PGA Tour Qualifying School graduates
- 2005 PGA Tour Qualifying School graduates
