= Ryan Howison =

American professional golfer (born 1966)

Personal information
- Nationality: United States
- Born: December 26, 1966 (age 59) Columbus, Ohio, U.S.
- Height: 5 ft 10 in (1.78 m)
- Weight: 185 lb (84 kg; 13.2 st)

Career
- Sport: Golf
- College: University of North Carolina
- Turned professional: 1990
- Former tours: PGA Tour; Nationwide Tour
- Professional wins: 3

Number of wins by tour
- Korn Ferry Tour: 3

Ryan Howison (born December 26, 1966) is an American professional golfer. He played on the PGA Tour and the Nationwide Tour from 1995 to 2008.

== Career ==
Howison earned his PGA Tour card through qualifying school in 1994. In 1995, he split time between the PGA Tour and the Korn Ferry Tour in 1995. He played on the Nationwide Tour from 1996 to 1999 and picked up three victories. He won the Nike Lakeland Classic in 1997 and in 1999 he won the Nike Lakeland Classic again and the Nike Ozarks Open en route to a 10th-place finish on the money list, earning him his PGA Tour card for 2000. He returned to the Nationwide Tour in 2001 where he would play until 2008.

Howison played baseball, not golf, at the University of North Carolina at Chapel Hill, where he was the starting third baseman for the 1989 College World Series team. After two rotator cuff surgeries his junior year, Howison began to pursue golf.

Howison started as a financial advisor in Palm Beach Gardens, Florida in 2009. His business name is OnCourse Wealth Management.

== Professional wins (3) ==
=== Nike Tour wins (3) ===
No.	Date	Tournament	Winning score	Margin of victory	Runner(s)-up
1	Feb 2, 1997	Nike Lakeland Classic	−19 (66-65-69-69=269)	3 strokes	(United States) Mark Carnevale
2	Jan 17, 1999	Nike Lakeland Classic (2)	−13 (68-71-68-68=275)	1 stroke	(Canada) Glen Hnatiuk, (United States) Jim McGovern, (United States) Shaun Micheel
3	Aug 15, 1999	Nike Ozarks Open	−18 (67-68-69-66=270)	Playoff	(England) Ed Fryatt

Nike Tour playoff record (1–3)

No.	Year	Tournament	Opponent(s)	Result
1	1998	Nike Knoxville Open	(United States) Robin Freeman	Lost to birdie on third extra hole
2	1998	Nike Dakota Dunes Open	(United States) John Maginnes, (United States) Sean Murphy	Maginnes won with birdie on second extra hole
3	1999	Nike Dakota Dunes Open	(United States) Craig Kanada, (United States) Fran Quinn	Quinn won with birdie on first extra hole
4	1999	Nike Ozarks Open	(England) Ed Fryatt	Won with par on first extra hole

== See also ==
- 1994 PGA Tour Qualifying School graduates
- 1999 Nike Tour graduates
