= Sean Murphy (golfer) =

American golfer (born 1965)

Personal information
- Full name: Sean Patrick Murphy
- Nationality: United States
- Born: August 17, 1965 (age 61) Des Moines, Iowa, U.S.
- Height: 5 ft 8 in (1.73 m)
- Weight: 165 lb (75 kg; 11.8 st)

Career
- Sport: Golf
- College: University of New Mexico
- Turned professional: 1988
- Former tours: PGA Tour; Nike Tour
- Professional wins: 6

Number of wins by tour
- Korn Ferry Tour: 6 (Tied 2nd all time)

Best results in major championships
- Masters Tournament: DNP
- PGA Championship: DNP
- U.S. Open: T32: 1996
- The Open Championship: CUT: 1996

Achievements and awards
- Nike Tour money list winner: 1993
- Nike Tour Player of the Year: 1993

Sean Patrick Murphy (born August 17, 1965) is an American professional golfer who has played on the PGA Tour and the Nationwide Tour.

== Early life and amateur career ==
Murphy was born in Des Moines, Iowa. His father got him started with golf at age 6.

Murphy was the New Mexico High School Champion in 1982 and 1984 and American Junior Golf Association Southwest Champion in 1983. He attended the University of New Mexico and was the Western Athletic Conference Player of the Year in 1988.

== Professional career ==
In 1988, Murphy turned professional. He was the first player to win on the Nike Tour four times in one year. He shared the Web.com Tour record for most career victories at six with Kevin Johnson, Matt Gogel and Jason Gore, until Gore earned his seventh win in 2010. Murphy was the Nike Tour Player of the Year and money leader in 1993.

Murphy has more than $1 million in career earnings. He has played in five major championships: 1993 U.S. Open at Baltusrol, 1996 U.S. Open at Oakland Hills, 1996 Open Championship at Royal Lytham & St. Annes, 1997 U.S. Open at Congressional, and 2003 U.S. Open at Olympia Fields. His best finish in a major championship was T-32 at Oakland Hills.

== Personal life ==
Murphy lives in Scottsdale, Arizona.

== Awards and honors ==
- In 1988, while at the University of New Mexico, Murphy was the Western Athletic Conference Player of the Year.
- In 1993, he was bestowed with the Nike Tour Player of the Year honors.
- In 1993, Murphy also won the Nike Tour money list.

== Professional wins (6) ==
=== Nike Tour wins (6) ===
| No. | Date | Tournament | Winning score | Margin of victory | Runner(s)-up |
|---|---|---|---|---|---|
| 1 | Mar 8, 1992 | Ben Hogan Louisiana Open | −16 (64-69-67=200) | 1 stroke | (Canada) Tony Grimes |
| 2 | Apr 25, 1993 | Nike Central Georgia Open | −11 (63-61-71=205) | 2 strokes | (United States) Don Walsworth |
| 3 | May 9, 1993 | Nike Greater Greenville Classic | −17 (72-65-67-67=271) | 1 stroke | (United States) Doug Martin |
| 4 | Sep 19, 1993 | Nike Utah Classic | −12 (68-70-66=204) | Playoff | (United States) Curt Byrum, (United States) Jim Carter, (United States) Tommy Moore |
| 5 | Oct 3, 1993 | Nike Sonoma County Open | −14 (67-71-68-68=274) | 1 stroke | (United States) Joey Rassett |
| 6 | Jul 2, 1995 | Nike Philadelphia Classic | −13 (65-68-67-67=267) | 1 stroke | (United States) Allen Doyle |

Nike Tour playoff record (1–2)

| No. | Year | Tournament | Opponents | Result |
|---|---|---|---|---|
| 1 | 1993 | Nike Utah Classic | (United States) Curt Byrum, (United States) Jim Carter, (United States) Tommy Moore | Won with birdie on third extra hole Byrum and Carter eliminated by birdie on second hole |
| 2 | 1998 | Nike Dakota Dunes Open | (United States) Ryan Howison, (United States) John Maginnes | Maginnes won with birdie on second extra hole |
| 3 | 1998 | Nike San Jose Open | (United States) Robin Freeman, (United States) Tom Scherrer | Freeman won with birdie on fourth extra hole |

== Results in major championships ==
| Tournament | 1993 | 1994 | 1995 | 1996 | 1997 | 1998 | 1999 | 2000 | 2001 | 2002 | 2003 |
|---|---|---|---|---|---|---|---|---|---|---|---|
| U.S. Open | CUT | | | T32 | CUT | | | | | | CUT |
| The Open Championship | | | | CUT | | | | | | | |

Did not play

CUT = missed the half-way cut
"T" = Tied
Note: Murphy never played in the Masters Tournament or the PGA Championship.

== See also ==
- 1989 PGA Tour Qualifying School graduates
- 1990 PGA Tour Qualifying School graduates
- 1993 Nike Tour graduates
- 1995 Nike Tour graduates
- 1998 Nike Tour graduates
- 1999 PGA Tour Qualifying School graduates
- 2000 PGA Tour Qualifying School graduates
- List of golfers with most Web.com Tour wins
