= Charles Raulerson =

American golfer (born 1964)

Personal information
- Nationality: United States
- Born: January 29, 1964 (age 62) Jacksonville, Florida, U.S.
- Height: 6 ft 0 in (1.83 m)
- Weight: 170 lb (77 kg; 12 st)

Career
- Sport: Golf
- College: Clemson University; Louisiana State University
- Turned professional: 1987
- Former tours: PGA Tour; European Tour; Nationwide Tour; Challenge Tour; NGA Hooters Tour
- Professional wins: 6

Number of wins by tour
- Korn Ferry Tour: 2
- Challenge Tour: 2
- Other: 2

Best results in major championships
- Masters Tournament: DNP
- PGA Championship: DNP
- U.S. Open: CUT: 2001, 2002
- The Open Championship: DNP

Charles Raulerson (born January 29, 1964) is an American professional golfer who played on the PGA Tour and the Nationwide Tour.

== Early life and amateur career ==
In 1964, Raulerson was born in Jacksonville, Florida. As an amateur, Raulerson played college golf at Clemson and LSU.

== Professional career ==
In 1987, Raulerson turned pro. Early in his career, Raulerson struggled on making into the PGA Tour. He played overseas and in North America. In 1989, he won the Jamaica Open. In 1990, Raulerson joined the Ben Hogan Tour, the PGA Tour's developmental tour. During this era, Raulerson also played on the European Tour's developmental tour, the Challenge Tour. He won two events in 1993.

Raulerson was successful at 1993 PGA Tour Qualifying School and joined the Tour in 1994. After a poor year on Tour, he took a hiatus from Tour until 1998 when he rejoined the developmental tour, now called the Nike Tour. Raulerson won two events that year, the Nike Oregon Classic and the Nike Inland Empire Open en route to a 7th-place finish on the money list. He returned to the PGA Tour in 1999 and spent two years on Tour before returning to the developmental tour, now called the Buy.com Tour, in 2001. Raulerson played on the developmental tour until 2003 until retiring from golf.

== Professional wins (6) ==
=== Nike Tour wins (2) ===
No.	Date	Tournament	Winning score	Margin of victory	Runner(s)-up
1	Sep 27, 1998	Nike Oregon Classic	−16 (68-69-65-70=272)	5 strokes	(United States) Notah Begay III, (United States) John Elliott, (United States) Tom Scherrer
2	Oct 11, 1998	Nike Inland Empire Open	−20 (66-70-66-66=268)	3 strokes	(United States) Jay Williamson

=== Challenge Tour wins (2) ===
No.	Date	Tournament	Winning score	Margin of victory	Runner-up
1	Apr 10, 1993	Open Jezequel	+8 (74-73-76-73=296)	2 strokes	(Scotland) Ian Young
2	Aug 28, 1993	Gore-Tex Challenge	−17 (70-67-67-67=271)	1 stroke	(England) Liam White

=== NGA Hooters Tour wins (1) ===
No.	Date	Tournament	Winning score	Margin of victory	Runner-up
1	Feb 11, 2001	NGA Ravines Golf Classic	−18 (65-66-71-70=272)	7 strokes	(United States) Zach Johnson

=== Other wins (1) ===
- 1989 Jamaica Open

== Results in major championships ==
Tournament	1996	1997	1998	1999	2000	2001	2002
U.S. Open	WD					CUT	CUT

Did not play

CUT = missed the half-way cut
WD = withdrew
Note: Raulerson only played in the U.S. Open.

== See also ==
- 1993 PGA Tour Qualifying School graduates
- 1998 Nike Tour graduates
