= Stuart Appleby =

Australian professional golfer (born 1971)

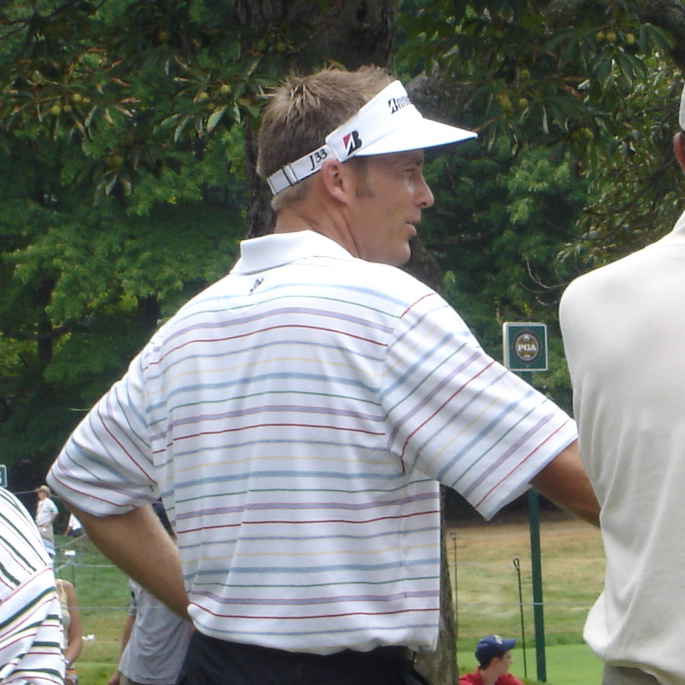
- Appleby at the 2005 PGA Championship

Personal information
- Nationality: Australia
- Born: 1 May 1971 (age 55) Cohuna, Victoria, Australia
- Height: 6 ft 1 in (1.85 m)
- Weight: 195 lb (88 kg; 13.9 st)
- Spouses: Renay White (m. 1995; died 1998); Ashley Saleet (m. 2002)
- Children: 4

Career
- Sport: Golf
- Turned professional: 1992
- Current tour: PGA Tour Champions
- Former tours: PGA Tour; PGA Tour of Australasia
- Professional wins: 20
- Highest ranking: 8 (21 March 2004)

Number of wins by tour
- PGA Tour: 9
- PGA Tour of Australasia: 3
- Korn Ferry Tour: 2
- Other: 6

Best results in major championships
- Masters Tournament: T7: 2007
- PGA Championship: T4: 2000
- U.S. Open: T10: 1998
- The Open Championship: T2: 2002

Achievements and awards
- PGA Tour Comeback Player of the Year: 2010

Stuart Appleby (born 1 May 1971) is an Australian professional golfer who plays on the PGA Tour Champions. He was a nine-time winner on the PGA Tour.

== Early life ==
Appleby was born on 1 May 1971, in Cohuna, Victoria, and grew up on a nearby dairy farm. He began in golf by hitting balls from paddock to paddock after his farm chores were completed. As a youth, he played Australian rules football.

== Professional career ==
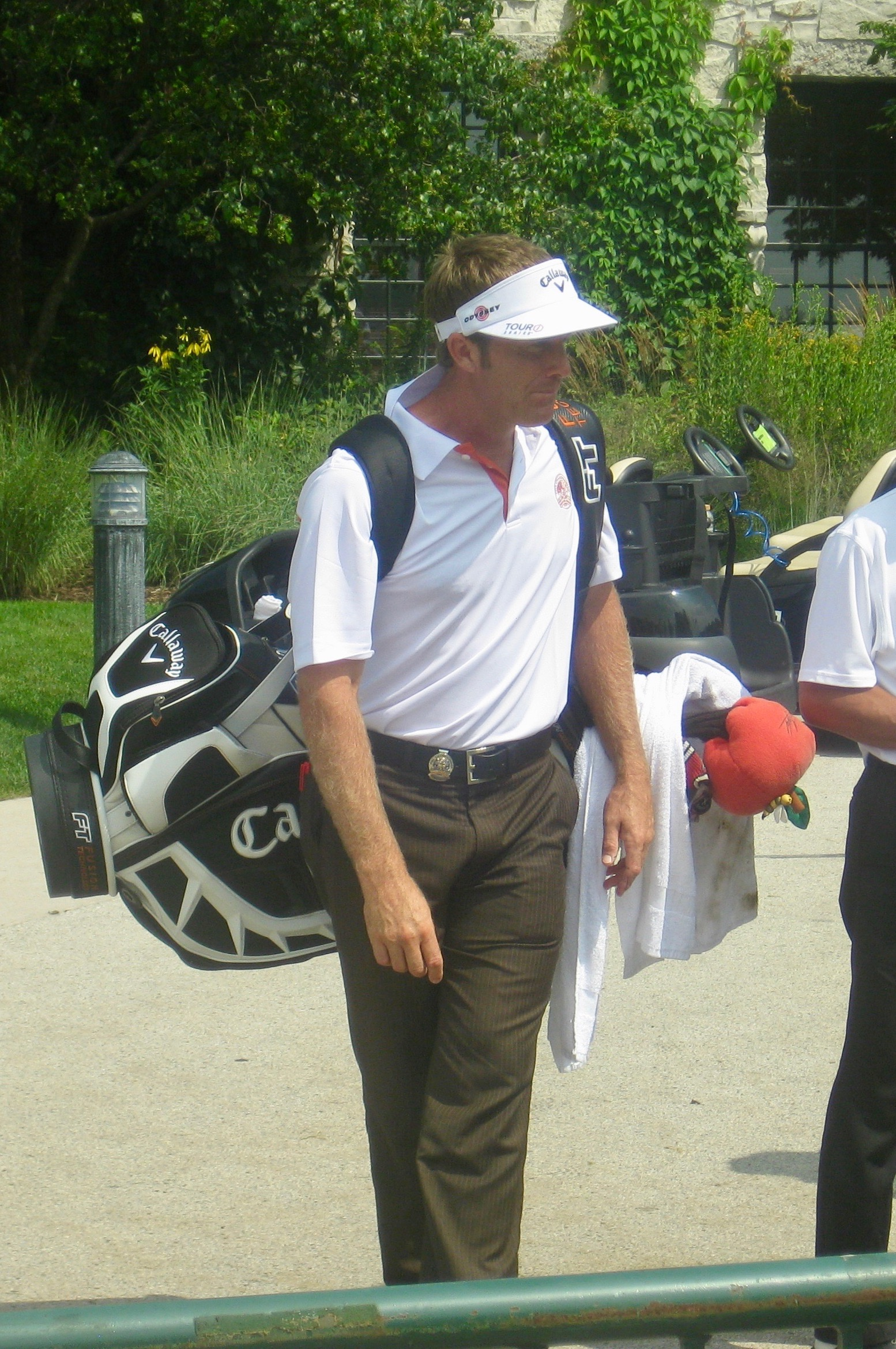
Appleby at the 2010 PGA Championship

Appleby turned professional in 1992 and began his career on the PGA Tour of Australasia. In 1995 he won twice on the Nike Tour (now known as the Web.com Tour), the second tier men's tour in the U.S. He was the eighth player to win his first Web.com Tour start. He qualified to compete on the PGA Tour the following year by finishing the season fifth on the money list.

Appleby has won nine times on the PGA Tour. He was a member of the International Team in the Presidents Cup five times, and featured in the top ten of the Official World Golf Ranking in 2004. His best performance in a major championship came in 2002, where he lost in a four-way playoff to Ernie Els at The Open Championship.

In 2010, during the final round of the inaugural Greenbrier Classic, Appleby became the fifth player in history to shoot a 59 in an official PGA Tour event, and won the PGA Tour Comeback Player of the Year award. Appleby was limited to seven starts before back surgery in March 2015. He made a start on the Web.com Tour for the first time in twenty years at the Nova Scotia Open, where he finished T36. Qualified for a medical extension, Appleby was allowed entry into the Web.com Tour Finals, but did not make a cut and played the 2016 season on a major medical extension. He burned through his medical extension and finished 143rd in the FedEx Cup. He tried to regain his Tour card through the Web.com Finals, but did not finish high enough when Hurricane Matthew threatened Florida and the final tournament was cancelled, leaving the top 25 players with their cards, and Appleby finished 31st, leaving him with limited status for the 2017 season. He finished 192nd in the FedEx Cup, limiting him to the Past Champions category for 2018.

== Personal life ==
Appleby's first wife Renay was struck and killed by a taxicab outside London Waterloo station in 1998, shortly after he had missed the cut at The Open Championship.

Appleby married his second wife, Ashley Saleet, in 2002, and they live with their four children in Orlando, Florida. After the 1999 plane crash that killed his friend and next-door neighbour Payne Stewart, he has been one of the key father figures for Stewart's children, Chelsea and Aaron. In his spare time, Appleby enjoys motor racing. He is the ambassador for Golf Australia's Crown Lager Social Golf Club and patron for Stuart Appleby Junior Golf.

== Professional wins (20) ==
=== PGA Tour wins (9) ===
No.	Date	Tournament	Winning score	To par	Margin of victory	Runner(s)-up
1	16 Mar 1997	Honda Classic	68-68-67-71=274	−14	1 stroke	(United States) Michael Bradley, (United States) Payne Stewart
2	7 Jun 1998	Kemper Open	70-63-69-72=274	−10	1 stroke	(United States) Scott Hoch
3	2 May 1999	Shell Houston Open	70-68-70-71=279	−9	1 stroke	(United States) John Cook, (United States) Hal Sutton
4	12 Oct 2003	Las Vegas Invitational	62-68-63-66-69=328	−31	Playoff	(United States) Scott McCarron
5	11 Jan 2004	Mercedes Championships	66-67-66-71=270	−22	1 stroke	(Fiji) Vijay Singh
6	9 Jan 2005	Mercedes Championships (2)	74-64-66-67=271	−21	1 stroke	(United States) Jonathan Kaye
7	8 Jan 2006	Mercedes Championships (3)	71-72-70-71=284	−8	Playoff	(Fiji) Vijay Singh
8	23 Apr 2006	Shell Houston Open (2)	66-67-69-67=269	−19	6 strokes	(United States) Bob Estes
9	1 Aug 2010	Greenbrier Classic	66-68-65-59=258	−22	1 stroke	(United States) Jeff Overton

PGA Tour playoff record (2–1)

No.	Year	Tournament	Opponent(s)	Result
1	2002	The Open Championship	(Australia) Steve Elkington, (South Africa) Ernie Els, (France) Thomas Levet	Els won with par on first extra hole after four-hole aggregate playoff; Els: E (4-3-5-4=16), Levet: E (4-2-5-5=16), Appleby: +1 (4-3-5-5=17), Elkington: +1 (5-3-4-5=17)
2	2003	Las Vegas Invitational	(United States) Scott McCarron	Won with birdie on first extra hole
3	2006	Mercedes Championships	(Fiji) Vijay Singh	Won with birdie on first extra hole

=== PGA Tour of Australasia wins (3) ===
Legend
Flagship events (1)
Other PGA Tour of Australasia (2)

No.	Date	Tournament	Winning score	To par	Margin of victory	Runner-up
1	20 Dec 1998	Schweppes Coolum Classic	68-67-67-69=271	−17	4 strokes	(Australia) Craig Spence
2	25 Nov 2001 (2002 season)	Holden Australian Open	69-70-67-65=271	−17	3 strokes	(Australia) Scott Laycock
3	14 Nov 2010	JBWere Masters	71-69-69-65=274	−10	1 stroke	(Australia) Adam Bland

=== Nike Tour wins (2) ===
No.	Date	Tournament	Winning score	To par	Margin of victory	Runner(s)-up
1	19 Mar 1995	Nike Monterrey Open	68-70-67-68=273	−15	Playoff	(Mexico) Rafael Alarcón
2	1 Oct 1995	Nike Sonoma County Open	69-69-65-66=269	−19	4 strokes	(United States) Bobby Collins, (United States) Joe Durant, (United States) Jerry Kelly

Nike Tour playoff record (1–1)

No.	Year	Tournament	Opponent(s)	Result
1	1995	Nike Monterrey Open	(Mexico) Rafael Alarcón	Won with birdie on seventh extra hole
2	1995	Nike Ozarks Open	(United States) P. H. Horgan III, (United States) Mike Schuchart	Schuchart won with birdie on second extra hole

=== Australasian Foundation Tour wins (5) ===
- 1991 Queensland Open (as an amateur)
- 1994 Victorian PGA Championship, Tasmanian Classic, South Australian PGA Championship, Nedlands Masters

=== Other wins (1) ===
No.	Date	Tournament	Winning score	To par	Margin of victory	Runners-up
1	3 Aug 1999	CVS Charity Classic (with (United States) Jeff Sluman)	63-59=122	−20	2 strokes	(United States) Brett Quigley and (United States) Dana Quigley

== Results in major championships ==
! Tournament	1997	1998	1999	2000	2001	2002	2003	2004	2005	2006	2007	2008	2009	2010	2011
Masters Tournament	T21	CUT	CUT	CUT	T31	CUT	CUT	T22	T43	T19	T7	T14	T30		CUT
U.S. Open	T36	T10	CUT	CUT	CUT	T37	CUT	CUT	CUT	CUT	T26	T36	CUT	T29	
The Open Championship	T20	CUT	CUT	T11	61	T2	T15	T36	T41	CUT	CUT	T51	T65		
PGA Championship	T61	CUT	CUT	T4	T16	T17	T23	T17	T15	T55	T12	T15	CUT	T68	

Top 10
Did not play

CUT = missed the half-way cut
"T" = tied

=== Summary ===
Tournament	Wins	2nd	3rd	Top-5	Top-10	Top-25	Events	Cuts made
Masters Tournament	0	0	0	0	1	5	14	8
U.S. Open	0	0	0	0	1	1	14	6
The Open Championship	0	1	0	1	1	4	13	9
PGA Championship	0	0	0	1	1	8	14	11
Totals	0	1	0	2	4	18	55	34

- Most consecutive cuts made – 6 (2007 PGA – 2009 Masters)
- Longest streak of top-10s – 1 (four times)

== Results in The Players Championship ==
Tournament	1997	1998	1999	2000	2001	2002	2003	2004	2005	2006	2007	2008	2009	2010	2011	2012	2013	2014
The Players Championship	T14	CUT	CUT	T22	T33	T28	T21	CUT	CUT	CUT	T16	T15	CUT		CUT			T77

Did not play

CUT = missed the halfway cut
"T" indicates a tie for a place

== Results in World Golf Championships ==
Tournament	1999	2000	2001	2002	2003	2004	2005	2006	2007	2008	2009	2010	2011
Match Play	R64	R64	R16	R64	R64	R32	R32	R64	R64	R16	R64		
Championship	T30	T25	NT^{1}	T11	T2	T16	T11	T6	T35	T34	T61		
Invitational	T23	T20	T5	T42	T46	T9	T13	T71	T14	T2	T51	T63	76
Champions												T69	T42

^{1}Cancelled due to 9/11

Top 10
Did not play

QF, R16, R32, R64 = Round in which player lost in match play
"T" = Tied
NT = No tournament
Note that the HSBC Champions did not become a WGC event until 2009.

Note: Appleby is the only golfer to compete in the first 32 WGC events.

== Team appearances ==
Amateur

- Sloan Morpeth Trophy (representing Australia): 1992
- Australian Men's Interstate Teams Matches (representing Victoria): 1991, 1992

Professional

- World Cup (representing Australia): 1996, 2003, 2009
- Alfred Dunhill Cup (representing Australia): 1997, 1998
- Presidents Cup (International Team): 1998 (winners), 2000, 2003 (tie), 2005, 2007

== See also ==
- 1995 Nike Tour graduates
- 1996 PGA Tour Qualifying School graduates
- Lowest rounds of golf
