= Tommy Tolles =

American golfer

Personal information
- Full name: Thomas Louis Tolles, Jr.
- Nationality: United States
- Born: October 21, 1966 (age 60) Fort Myers, Florida, U.S.
- Height: 6 ft 2 in (1.88 m)
- Weight: 190 lb (86 kg; 14 st)
- Spouse: Ilse Tolles
- Children: 2

Career
- Sport: Golf
- College: University of Georgia
- Turned professional: 1988
- Current tour: PGA Tour Champions
- Former tours: PGA Tour; Nike Tour; Tarheel Tour
- Professional wins: 3
- Highest ranking: 29 (October 5, 1997)

Number of wins by tour
- Korn Ferry Tour: 2
- Other: 1

Best results in major championships
- Masters Tournament: 3rd: 1997
- PGA Championship: T3: 1996
- U.S. Open: T5: 1997
- The Open Championship: T33: 1996

Thomas Louis Tolles Jr. (born October 21, 1966) is an American professional golfer. He has played on the PGA Tour, the Nike Tour, and the PGA Tour Champions.

== Early life ==
Tolles was born in Ft. Myers, Florida.

== Professional career ==
He has two Nike Tour victories and has finished runner-up in two PGA Tour events including the 1996 Players Championship. Tolles led by two strokes after three rounds but a final round 72 left him in a tie for second place, four behind Fred Couples.

Tolles had a pair of third-place finishes in major championships. He finished solo third at the 1997 Masters Tournament and tied for third at the 1996 PGA Championship.

Tolles finished T-5 at the U.S. Open in 1997 and finished 1 spot out (11th) from making the 1997 U.S. Ryder Cup team.

== Professional wins (3) ==
=== Nike Tour wins (2) ===
No.	Date	Tournament	Winning score	Margin of victory	Runner(s)-up
1	Jul 25, 1993	Nike Ozarks Open	−17 (68-68-69-66=271)	2 strokes	(United States) Bob Burns, (United States) Bob May
2	May 1, 1994	Nike Alabama Classic	−14 (66-69-70-69=274)	1 stroke	(United States) Clark Burroughs

Nike Tour playoff record (0–1)

No.	Year	Tournament	Opponents	Result
1	1992	Ben Hogan Greater Ozarks Open	(United States) Lennie Clements, (United States) Ted Tryba	Clements won with birdie on first extra hole

=== Tarheel Tour wins (1) ===
No.	Date	Tournament	Winning score	Margin of victory	Runner-up
1	Mar 1, 2007	Patriots Point Classic	−12 (70-67-67=204)	Playoff	(United States) Alex Hamilton

== Results in major championships ==
Tournament	1988	1989	1990	1991	1992	1993	1994	1995	1996	1997	1998	1999
Masters Tournament										3	CUT	
U.S. Open	CUT			CUT					T40	T5	WD	
The Open Championship									T33	69		
PGA Championship									T3	T13	CUT	CUT

Top 10
Did not play

WD = withdrew from tournament
CUT = missed the half-way cut
"T" = tied

== Results in The Players Championship ==
Tournament	1996	1997	1998	1999	2000
The Players Championship	T2	T7	CUT	T46	CUT

Top 10

CUT = missed the halfway cut
"T" indicates a tie for a place

== See also ==
- 1994 PGA Tour Qualifying School graduates
- 2000 PGA Tour Qualifying School graduates
- 2003 Nationwide Tour graduates
