= San Jose Open =

Golf tournament

Nike San Jose Open
Tournament information
- Location: San Jose, California
- Established: 1995
- Course: Almaden Country Club
- Par: 72
- Tour: Nike Tour
- Format: Stroke play
- Prize fund: $225,000
- Final year: 1998

Tournament record score
- Aggregate: 272 R. W. Eaks (1997); 272 Robin Freeman (1998); 272 Sean Murphy (1998); 272 Tom Scherrer (1998)
- To par: −16 as above

Final champion
- (United States) Robin Freeman
- Location in the United States Location in California

The San Jose Open was a golf tournament on the Nike Tour. It ran from 1995 to 1998. It was played at Almaden Country Club in San Jose, California.

In 1998 the winner earned $40,500.

== Winners ==
Year	Winner	Score	To par	Margin of victory	Runner(s)-up	Ref.
Nike San Jose Open
1998	(United States) Robin Freeman	272	−16	Playoff	(United States) Sean Murphy (United States) Tom Scherrer	
1997	(United States) R. W. Eaks	272	−16	2 strokes	(United States) Mark Carnevale (United States) Chris DiMarco (United States) Steve Lamontagne (United States) J. L. Lewis (Malaysia) Iain Steel	
1996	(United States) Larry Silveira	207 (Note: Shortened to 54 holes due to rain.)	−9	Playoff	(United States) Stewart Cink (United States) Bobby Elliott	
1995	(United States) John Maginnes	277	−11	3 strokes	(United States) Larry Silveira	
