= BMW Charity Pro-Am =

Golf tournament

Tournament information
- Location: Greer, South Carolina
- Established: 1992
- Courses: Thornblade Club; The Carolina Country Club
- Par: 71 (TC); 72 (CCC)
- Length: 7,062 yards (6,457 m) (TC); 6,929 yards (6,336 m) (CCC)
- Tour: Korn Ferry Tour
- Format: Stroke play
- Prize fund: US$1,000,000
- Month played: June

Tournament record score
- Aggregate: 257 Michael Arnaud (2018)
- To par: −27 Michael Arnaud (2018) −27 Mito Pereira (2021)

Current champion
- (United States) Ben Kohles

Final champion
- Location in the United States Location in South Carolina

The BMW Charity Pro-Am is a golf tournament on the Korn Ferry Tour. It is currently played at Thornblade Club (host course) in Greer, South Carolina and The Carolina Country Club in Spartanburg, South Carolina.

From 1992 to 2000, the event was played at Verdae Greens Golf Club in Greenville.

When the event changed to a pro-am format in 2001, it moved to The Cliffs in Travelers Rest, South Carolina, using the Valley and Keowee Vineyards courses. The Walnut Cove course was added in 2005. In 2008, the tournament shifted to three different courses: Thornblade Club, Carolina Country Club in Spartanburg, South Carolina and Bright's Creek Golf Club in Mill Spring, North Carolina. In 2012, the Greenville Country Club (Chanticleer course) replaced Bright's Creek.

The 2017 purse was $700,000, with $126,000 going to champion Stephan Jäger. Since 2002, the tournament has been sponsored by German car manufacturer BMW, which has an assembly plant in Spartanburg County.

== Courses ==
Season(s)	Host course	Other course(s)	
2022	Thornblade Club	The Carolina CC	
2019–2021	Thornblade Club	The Cliffs Valley Course	
2018	Thornblade Club	Furman University GC	The Cliffs Valley Course
2017	Thornblade Club	Furman University GC	The Preserve at Verdae
2016	Thornblade Club	The Reserve at Lake Keowee	The Preserve at Verdae
2014–2015	Thornblade Club	The Reserve at Lake Keowee	Green Valley CC
2013	Thornblade Club	The Reserve at Lake Keowee	Greenville CC
2012	Thornblade Club	The Carolina CC	Greenville CC
2008–2011	Thornblade Club	The Carolina CC	Bright's Creek GC
2005–2007	The Cliffs Valley Course	The Cliffs at Keowee Vineyards	The Cliffs at Walnut Cove
2001–2004	The Cliffs Valley Course	The Cliffs at Keowee Vineyards	
1992–2000	Verdae Greens GC		

== Winners ==
Year	Winner	Score	To par	Margin of victory	Runner(s)-up
BMW Charity Pro-Am
2026	(United States) Ben Kohles	268	−15	4 strokes	(United States) Logan McAllister
2025	(United States) Austin Smotherman	260	−25	3 strokes	(Denmark) Sebastian Cappelen (United States) Pierceson Coody (China) Yuan Yechun
2024	(United States) Ryan Gerard	259	−26	6 strokes	(United States) Seth Reeves
2023	(Belgium) Adrien Dumont de Chassart	264	−21	Playoff	(United States) Josh Teater
2022	(United States) Robby Shelton	263	−22	Playoff	(United States) Ben Griffin
2021	(Chile) Mito Pereira	258	−27	4 strokes	(United States) Justin Lower
2020	Canceled due to the COVID-19 pandemic				
2019	(Australia) Rhein Gibson	193 (Note: Shortened to 54 holes due to weather.)	−21	3 strokes	(United States) Michael Miller
2018	(United States) Michael Arnaud	257	−27	5 strokes	(South Korea) Lee Kyoung-hoon (United States) Robby Shelton
2017	(Germany) Stephan Jäger	195	−19	1 stroke	(United States) Tyler Duncan (United States) Andrew Yun (China) Zhang Xinjun
2016	(United States) Richy Werenski	265	−21	2 strokes	(United States) Brian Campbell (Australia) Brett Drewitt (United States) Zack Sucher
2015	(Australia) Rod Pampling	261	−25	2 strokes	(United States) Kelly Kraft
2014	(United States) Max Homa	266	−20	1 stroke	(United States) Jonathan Randolph
2013	(United States) Mark Anderson	259	−27	5 strokes	(United States) Tom Hoge
2012	(Australia) Nick Flanagan (2)	271	−15	Playoff	(Australia) Cameron Percy
2011	(South Africa) Garth Mulroy	268	−18	Playoff	(South Korea) Kang Sung-hoon
2010	(United States) Justin Hicks	266	−20	2 strokes	(United States) Kevin Chappell (United States) Tommy Gainey (United States) Chris Kirk (United States) Jamie Lovemark
2009	(Australia) Michael Sim	264	−22	Playoff	(Argentina) Fabián Gómez
2008	(United States) David Mathis	266	−20	3 strokes	(United States) Roger Tambellini
2007	(Australia) Nick Flanagan	271	−15	1 stroke	(United States) Nicholas Thompson
2006	(United States) Ken Duke	273	−13	1 stroke	(United States) Jess Daley
2005	(United States) Shane Bertsch (2)	202	−12	1 stroke	(United States) Charley Hoffman (United States) Bubba Watson
2004	(Japan) Ryuji Imada	270	−17	Playoff	(Australia) Paul Gow
2003	(United States) Tripp Isenhour	269	−18	2 strokes	(United States) Kyle Thompson
2002	(United States) Charles Warren	264	−23	4 strokes	(United States) Todd Fischer
Buy.com Charity Pro-Am
2001	(United States) Jonathan Byrd	269	−18	1 stroke	(South Africa) Brenden Pappas
Buy.com Upstate Classic
2000	(United States) Shane Bertsch	269	−19	4 strokes	(United States) Tim Straub
Nike Upstate Classic
1999	(United States) Steve Gotsche	208	−8	2 strokes	(United States) Jeff Gove (United States) Jim Johnson (United States) Sam Randolph
1998	(United States) Tom Scherrer	200	−16	1 stroke	(United States) J. L. Lewis
1997	(United States) Chris Smith	267	−21	3 strokes	(Australia) Terry Price
Nike Greater Greenville Classic
1996	(United States) Michael Christie	265	−23	6 strokes	(United States) Danny Ellis
1995	(United States) David Toms	267	−21	Playoff	(United States) Tom Scherrer
1994	(United States) Scott Gump	272	−16	1 stroke	(United States) Tim Conley
1993	(United States) Sean Murphy	271	−17	1 stroke	(United States) Doug Martin
Ben Hogan Greater Greenville Classic
1992	(United States) Russell Beiersdorf	133 (Note: Shortened to 36 holes due to rain.)	−11	2 strokes	(United States) Karl Kimball
