= Open Jezequel =

Tournament information
- Location: Saint-Cyr-sur-Mer, France
- Established: 1993
- Course: Golf de Fregate
- Par: 72
- Tour: Challenge Tour
- Format: Stroke play
- Prize fund: £55,000
- Month played: July
- Final year: 1994

Tournament record score
- Aggregate: 296 Charles Raulerson (1993)
- To par: +8 as above

Final champion
- (England) Carl Watts

Location map
- Location in France Location in Provence-Alpes-Côte d'Azur

The Open Jezequel was a golf tournament on the Challenge Tour, held 1993–1994 in France.

== Winners ==
Year	Winner	Score	To par	Margin of victory	Runner(s)-up	Ref.
1994	(England) Carl Watts	298	+10	Playoff	(Sweden) Kenny Cross (England) John Metcalfe (France) Dominique Nouailhac (England) Philip Talbot	
1993	(United States) Charles Raulerson	296	+8	2 strokes	(Scotland) Ian Young	
