= 1998 Nike Tour graduates =

This is a list of players who graduated from the Nike Tour in 1998. The top 15 players on the Nike Tour's money list in 1998 earned their PGA Tour card for 1999.

	1998 Nike Tour		1999 PGA Tour				
Player	Money list rank	Earnings ($)	Starts	Cuts made	Best finish	Money list rank	Earnings ($)
(United States) Bob Burns	1	178,664	31	14	T18	177	138,118
(United States) Robin Freeman	2	169,389	29	11	T38	219	62,495
(United States) Joe Ogilvie*	3	157,812	31	14	T9	137	287,346
(United States) Eric Booker*	4	153,526	31	14	T3	127	320,753
(United States) John Maginnes	5	145,210	29	16	6/T6	93	426,666
(United States) Dennis Paulson	6	145,065	28	25	2	27	1,313,814
(United States) Charles Raulerson	7	142,976	32	20	7	125	326,893
(United States) Woody Austin	8	140,955	30	20	T9	121	338,045
(United States) Mike Sposa*	9	140,139	31	17	T10	147	255,408
(United States) Notah Begay III*	10	136,289	29	22	Win (twice)	31	1,255,314
(United States) Jimmy Green	11	131,942	28	10	T7	171	152,091
(United States) Sean Murphy	12	130,030	29	15	T13	159	185,299
(United States) Emlyn Aubrey	13	129,967	18	10	T7	136	290,806
(United States) Tom Scherrer	14	129,134	29	20	T5	92	427,849
(United States) Doug Dunakey*	15	128,052	32	12	T3	133	298,069

*PGA Tour rookie for 1999.

T = Tied
Green background indicates the player retained his PGA Tour card for 2000 (won or finished inside the top 125, excluding non-members).
Yellow background indicates player did not retain his PGA Tour card for 2000, but retained conditional status (finished between 126–150, excluding non-members).
Red background indicates the player did not retain his PGA Tour card for 2000 (finished outside the top 150).

== Winners on the PGA Tour in 1999 ==
No.	Date	Player	Tournament	Winning score	Margin of victory	Runner(s)-up
1	Aug 29	(United States) Notah Begay III	Reno-Tahoe Open	−14 (70-69-63-72=274)	3 strokes	(United States) Chris Perry, (United States) David Toms
2	Oct 8	(United States) Notah Begay III	Michelob Championship at Kingsmill (Won on second playoff hole)	−10 (67-70-69-68=274)	Playoff	(United States) Tom Byrum

== Runners-up on the PGA Tour in 1999 ==
No.	Date	Player	Tournament	Winner	Winning score	Runner-up score
1	Jun 27	(United States) Dennis Paulson (Lost on first playoff hole)	Buick Classic	(United States) Duffy Waldorf	−8 (70-67-68-71=276)	−8 (71-70-68-67=276)

== See also ==
- 1998 PGA Tour Qualifying School graduates
