= 1995 Nike Tour graduates =

This is a list of players who graduated from the Nike Tour in 1995. The top ten players on the Nike Tour's money list in 1995 earned their PGA Tour card for 1996.

	1995 Nike Tour		1996 PGA Tour				
Player	Money list rank	Earnings ($)	Starts	Cuts made	Best finish	Money list rank	Earnings ($)
(United States) Jerry Kelly*	1	188,878	31	17	2	59	336,748
(United States) Allen Doyle*	2	176,652	28	16	T10	140	136,789
(United States) David Toms	3	174,892	29	16	6	105	205,188
(United States) Franklin Langham*	4	158,990	33	15	T15	174	83,632
(Australia) Stuart Appleby*	5	144,419	30	18	T10	130	164,483
(United States) Tom Scherrer*	6	143,404	34	12	3	141	136,323
(United States) Chris Smith*	7	143,200	28	12	T29	206	41,112
(United States) Sean Murphy	8	118,985	26	15	T14	173	86,394
(United States) Hugh Royer III*	9	118,804	31	16	T5	114	183,066
(United States) Brad Fabel	10	115,513	27	18	7	97	228,667

*PGA Tour rookie for 1996.

T = Tied
Green background indicates the player retained his PGA Tour card for 1997 (finished inside the top 125).
Yellow background indicates player did not retain his PGA Tour card for 1997, but retained conditional status (finished between 126 and 150).
Red background indicates the player did not retain his PGA Tour card for 1997 (finished outside the top 150).

== Runners-up on the PGA Tour in 1996 ==
No.	Date	Player	Tournament	Winner	Winning score	Runner-up score
1	Sep 1	(United States) Jerry Kelly	Greater Milwaukee Open	(United States) Loren Roberts (Won on first playoff hole)	−19 (66-65-66-68=265)	−19 (67-66-68-64=265)

== See also ==
- 1995 PGA Tour Qualifying School graduates
