= 1995 Nike Tour =

Golf tour season

1995 Nike Tour season
- Duration: February 23, 1995 – October 22, 1995
- Number of official events: 30
- Most wins: (United States) Allen Doyle (3)
- Money list: (United States) Jerry Kelly
- Player of the Year: (United States) Jerry Kelly

The 1995 Nike Tour was the sixth season of the Nike Tour, the official development tour to the PGA Tour.

== Schedule ==
The following table lists official events during the 1995 season.

Date	Tournament	Location	Purse (US$)	Winner (Note: The number in parentheses after each winner's name is the number of Nike Tour events they had won up to and including that tournament. This information is only shown for Nike Tour members. It is rare for someone to accumulate many wins on the Nike Tour as success at this level usually leads to promotion to the PGA Tour.)	Notes
Feb 26	Nike San Jose Open	California	200,000	(United States) John Maginnes (1)	New tournament
Mar 5	Nike Inland Empire Open	California	200,000	(United States) Jeff Brehaut (1)	
Mar 19	Nike Monterrey Open	Mexico	225,000	(Australia) Stuart Appleby (1)	
Mar 26	Nike Louisiana Open	Louisiana	200,000	(United States) Stan Utley (2)	
Apr 2	Nike Pensacola Classic	Florida	200,000	(United States) Clarence Rose (1)	
Apr 9	Nike Mississippi Gulf Coast Classic	Mississippi	200,000	(United States) Allen Doyle (1)	
Apr 17	Nike Tallahassee Open	Florida	200,000	(United States) Bill Murchison (1)	New tournament
Apr 23	Nike Shreveport Open	Louisiana	200,000	(United States) Brad Fabel (2)	
Apr 30	Nike Alabama Classic	Alabama	200,000	(United States) Jerry Kelly (1)	
May 7	Nike South Carolina Classic	South Carolina	200,000	(United States) Jerry Foltz (1)	
May 14	Nike Central Georgia Open	Georgia	200,000	(United States) Matt Peterson (1)	
May 21	Nike Knoxville Open	Tennessee	200,000	(United States) Tom Scherrer (1)	
May 28	Nike Greater Greenville Classic	South Carolina	200,000	(United States) David Toms (1)	
Jun 4	Nike Dominion Open	Virginia	200,000	(United States) Hugh Royer III (3)	
Jun 11	Nike Miami Valley Open	Ohio	200,000	(United States) Stan Utley (3)	
Jun 18	Nike Cleveland Open	Ohio	200,000	(United States) Karl Zoller (1)	
Jun 25	Nike Carolina Classic	North Carolina	200,000	(United States) Michael Christie (1)	
Jul 2	Nike Philadelphia Classic	Pennsylvania	200,000	(United States) Sean Murphy (6)	New tournament
Jul 16	Nike Buffalo Open	New York	200,000	(United States) Jerry Kelly (2)	
Jul 23	Nike Gateway Classic	Missouri	200,000	(United States) Chris Smith (1)	
Jul 30	Nike Wichita Open	Kansas	200,000	(United States) David Toms (2)	
Aug 6	Nike Dakota Dunes Open	South Dakota	200,000	(United States) Chris Smith (2)	
Aug 13	Nike Ozarks Open	Missouri	200,000	(United States) Mike Schuchart (3)	
Aug 20	Nike Permian Basin Open	Texas	200,000	(United States) Hugh Royer III (4)	
Aug 27	Nike Texarkana Open	Arkansas	200,000	(United States) Allen Doyle (2)	
Sep 10	Nike Utah Classic	Utah	200,000	(Canada) Glen Hnatiuk (2)	
Sep 17	Nike Tri-Cities Open	Washington	200,000	(United States) Jeff Gove (1)	
Sep 24	Nike Boise Open	Idaho	250,000	(United States) Frank Lickliter (1)	
Oct 1	Nike Sonoma County Open	California	200,000	(Australia) Stuart Appleby (2)	
Oct 22	Nike Tour Championship	Georgia	250,000	(United States) Allen Doyle (3)	Tour Championship

== Money list ==
The money list was based on prize money won during the season, calculated in U.S. dollars. The top 10 players on the money list earned status to play on the 1996 PGA Tour.

Position	Player	Prize money ($)
1	(United States) Jerry Kelly	188,878
2	(United States) Allen Doyle	176,652
3	(United States) David Toms	174,892
4	(United States) Franklin Langham	158,990
5	(Australia) Stuart Appleby	144,419

== Awards ==
Award	Winner	Ref.
Player of the Year (Jack Nicklaus Trophy)	(United States) Jerry Kelly	
