= Doug Dunakey =

American former professional golfer

Personal information
- Nationality: United States
- Born: July 7, 1963 (age 63) Waterloo, Iowa, U.S.
- Height: 5 ft 11 in (1.80 m)
- Weight: 185 lb (84 kg; 13.2 st)

Career
- Sport: Golf
- College: California State University, Stanislaus
- Turned professional: 1987
- Former tours: PGA Tour; Nationwide Tour
- Professional wins: 3

Number of wins by tour
- Korn Ferry Tour: 1
- Other: 2

Best results in major championships
- Masters Tournament: DNP
- PGA Championship: DNP
- U.S. Open: CUT: 2003
- The Open Championship: DNP

Doug Dunakey (born July 7, 1963) is an American former professional golfer who played on the PGA Tour and the Nationwide Tour. He is known for shooting a 59 in the 1998 Nike Miami Valley Open, becoming only the fourth player to shoot a 59 on a major tour.

== Career ==
In 1987, Dunakey turned pro. Over a decade later, in 1998, he joined the Nike Tour, the PGA Tour's developmental tour. He shot a 59 in the second round of the Nike Miami Valley Open. Dunakey could have shot a 57; but he three putted the 18th hole. Despite shooting a 59, he did not win the tournament, finishing in a tie for second behind Craig Bowden. He won his first title on tour at the Nike Cleveland Open the following week. This win helped him finish 15th on the tour's money list with $128,052. His 15th-place finish earned him his PGA Tour card for 1999.

In his rookie year on the PGA Tour, Dunakey made 12 of 32 cuts while earning $298,069, good enough for a finish of 133rd on the money list. His best finish of the year came at the Honda Classic where he finished tied for third. Dunakey did not finish high enough on the money list to earn his PGA Tour card for 2000 so he earned it through qualifying school. In his second year on tour, Dunakey recorded two top ten finishes and earned $393,059. He finished 124th on the money list and in doing so, retained his tour card for 2001. 2001 did not go well for Dunakey and it would be his last year on the PGA Tour. He played on the Nationwide Tour in 2002 and 2003 before retiring.

After his touring career ended, Dunakey became the golf coach at Lemon Bay High School.

== Professional wins (3) ==
=== Nike Tour wins (1) ===
| No. | Date | Tournament | Winning score | Margin of victory | Runner-up |
|---|---|---|---|---|---|
| 1 | Jun 14, 1998 | Nike Cleveland Open | −18 (68-72-65-65=270) | 1 stroke | (United States) Dennis Paulson |

=== Other wins (2) ===
- 1993 North Dakota Open
- 1997 Colorado Open

== Results in major championships ==
| Tournament | 2003 |
|---|---|
| U.S. Open | CUT |

CUT = missed the half-way cut
Note: Dunakey only played in the U.S. Open.

== See also ==
- 1998 Nike Tour graduates
- 1999 PGA Tour Qualifying School graduates
- Lowest rounds of golf
