= 1996 PGA Tour =

Golf tour season

1996 PGA Tour season
- Duration: January 4, 1996 – October 28, 1996
- Number of official events: 44 (Note: One further tournament was scheduled but was canceled.)
- Most wins: (United States) Phil Mickelson (4)
- Money list: (United States) Tom Lehman
- Player of the Year: (United States) Tom Lehman
- PGA Player of the Year: (United States) Tom Lehman
- Rookie of the Year: (United States) Tiger Woods

The 1996 PGA Tour was the 81st season of the PGA Tour, the main professional golf tour in the United States. It was also the 28th season since separating from the PGA of America.

== Schedule ==
The following table lists official events during the 1996 season.

Date	Tournament	Location	Purse (US$)	Winner (Note: The number in parentheses after each winner's name is the number of PGA Tour events they had won up to and including that tournament. This information is only shown for PGA Tour members.)	OWGR points	Notes
Jan 7	Mercedes Championships	California	1,000,000	(United States) Mark O'Meara (11)	52	Winners-only event
Jan 14	Nortel Open	Arizona	1,250,000	(United States) Phil Mickelson (6)	42	
Jan 21	Bob Hope Chrysler Classic	California	1,300,000	(United States) Mark Brooks (5)	42	Pro-Am
Jan 27	Phoenix Open	Arizona	1,300,000	(United States) Phil Mickelson (7)	48	
~~Feb 4~~	AT&T Pebble Beach National Pro-Am	California	–	Canceled (Note: Canceled after 36 holes due to weather.)	–	Pro-Am
Feb 11	Buick Invitational	California	1,200,000	(United States) Davis Love III (10)	52	
Feb 18	United Airlines Hawaiian Open	Hawaii	1,200,000	(United States) Jim Furyk (2)	38	
Feb 25	Nissan Open	California	1,200,000	(United States) Craig Stadler (12)	46	
Mar 3	Doral-Ryder Open	Florida	1,800,000	(Australia) Greg Norman (18)	68	
Mar 10	Honda Classic	Florida	1,300,000	(United States) Tim Herron (1)	50	
Mar 17	Bay Hill Invitational	Florida	1,200,000	(United States) Paul Goydos (1)	68	Invitational
Mar 24	Freeport-McDermott Classic	Louisiana	1,200,000	(United States) Scott McCarron (1)	42	
Mar 31	The Players Championship	Florida	3,500,000	(United States) Fred Couples (12)	80	Flagship event
Apr 7	BellSouth Classic	Georgia	1,300,000	(United States) Paul Stankowski (1)	54	
Apr 14	Masters Tournament	Georgia	2,500,000	(England) Nick Faldo (8)	100	Major championship
Apr 21	MCI Classic	South Carolina	1,400,000	(United States) Loren Roberts (3)	60	Invitational
Apr 28	Greater Greensboro Chrysler Classic	North Carolina	1,800,000	(United States) Mark O'Meara (12)	44	
May 5	Shell Houston Open	Texas	1,500,000	(United States) Mark Brooks (6)	40	
May 12	GTE Byron Nelson Golf Classic	Texas	1,500,000	(United States) Phil Mickelson (8)	56	
May 19	MasterCard Colonial	Texas	1,500,000	(United States) Corey Pavin (14)	60	Invitational
May 26	Kemper Open	Maryland	1,500,000	(United States) Steve Stricker (1)	40	
Jun 2	Memorial Tournament	Ohio	1,800,000	(United States) Tom Watson (38)	68	Invitational
Jun 9	Buick Classic	New York	1,200,000	(South Africa) Ernie Els (3)	56	
Jun 16	U.S. Open	Michigan	2,400,000	(United States) Steve Jones (5)	100	Major championship
Jun 23	FedEx St. Jude Classic	Tennessee	1,350,000	(United States) John Cook (7)	40	
Jun 30	Canon Greater Hartford Open	Connecticut	1,500,000	(United States) D. A. Weibring (5)	42	
Jul 7	Motorola Western Open	Illinois	2,000,000	(United States) Steve Stricker (2)	68	
Jul 14	Michelob Championship at Kingsmill	Virginia	1,250,000	(United States) Scott Hoch (7)	24	
Jul 21	The Open Championship	England	£1,500,000	(United States) Tom Lehman (3)	100	Major championship
Jul 21	Deposit Guaranty Golf Classic	Mississippi	1,000,000	(United States) Willie Wood (1)	20	Alternate event
Jul 28	CVS Charity Classic	Massachusetts	1,200,000	(United States) John Cook (8)	26	
Aug 4	Buick Open	Michigan	1,200,000	(United States) Justin Leonard (1)	50	
Aug 11	PGA Championship	Kentucky	2,400,000	(United States) Mark Brooks (7)	100	Major championship
Aug 18	Sprint International	Colorado	1,600,000	(United States) Clarence Rose (1)	66	
Aug 25	NEC World Series of Golf	Ohio	2,100,000	(United States) Phil Mickelson (9)	58	Limited-field event
Aug 25	Greater Vancouver Open	Canada	1,000,000	(United States) Guy Boros (1)	22	Alternate event
Sep 1	Greater Milwaukee Open	Wisconsin	1,200,000	(United States) Loren Roberts (4)	38	
Sep 8	Bell Canadian Open	Canada	1,500,000	(United States) Dudley Hart (1)	40	
Sep 15	Quad City Classic	Illinois	1,200,000	(United States) Ed Fiori (4)	32	
Sep 22	B.C. Open	New York	1,000,000	(United States) Fred Funk (4)	28	
Sep 29	Buick Challenge	Georgia	1,000,000	(United States) Michael Bradley (1)	26	
Oct 6	Las Vegas Invitational	Nevada	1,650,000	(United States) Tiger Woods (1)	50	
Oct 13	LaCantera Texas Open	Texas	1,200,000	(United States) David Ogrin (1)	40	
Oct 20	Walt Disney World/Oldsmobile Classic	Florida	1,200,000	(United States) Tiger Woods (2)	46	
Oct 28	The Tour Championship	Oklahoma	3,000,000	(United States) Tom Lehman (4)	60	Tour Championship

=== Unofficial events ===
The following events were sanctioned by the PGA Tour, but did not carry official money, nor were wins official.

Date	Tournament	Location	Purse ($)	Winner(s)	OWGR points	Notes
Sep 15	Presidents Cup	Virginia	n/a	Team USA	n/a	Team event
Nov 3	Subaru Sarazen World Open	Georgia	1,900,000	(New Zealand) Frank Nobilo	40	
Nov 10	Lincoln-Mercury Kapalua International	Hawaii	1,200,000	(United States) Paul Stankowski	40	
Nov 15	MasterCard PGA Grand Slam of Golf	Hawaii	1,000,000	(United States) Tom Lehman	n/a	Limited-field event
Nov 17	Franklin Templeton Shark Shootout	California	1,100,000	(United States) Jay Haas and (United States) Tom Kite	n/a	Team event
Nov 24	World Cup of Golf	South Africa	1,300,000	(South Africa) Ernie Els and (South Africa) Wayne Westner	n/a	Team event
Nov 24	World Cup of Golf Individual Trophy	South Africa	200,000	(South Africa) Ernie Els	n/a	
Dec 1	Skins Game	California	540,000	(United States) Fred Couples	n/a	Limited-field event
Dec 8	JCPenney Classic	Florida	1,500,000	(United States) Donna Andrews and (United States) Mike Hulbert	n/a	Team event
Dec 15	Diners Club Matches	California	700,000	(United States) Tom Lehman and (United States) Duffy Waldorf	n/a	Team event

== Money list ==
The money list was based on prize money won during the season, calculated in U.S. dollars.

Position	Player	Prize money ($)
1	(United States) Tom Lehman	1,780,159
2	(United States) Phil Mickelson	1,697,799
3	(United States) Mark Brooks	1,429,396
4	(United States) Steve Stricker	1,383,739
5	(United States) Mark O'Meara	1,255,749
6	(United States) Fred Couples	1,248,694
7	(United States) Davis Love III	1,211,139
8	(United States) Brad Faxon	1,055,050
9	(United States) Scott Hoch	1,039,564
10	(United States) David Duval	977,079

== Awards ==
Award	Winner	Ref.
PGA Tour Player of the Year (Jack Nicklaus Trophy)	(United States) Tom Lehman	
PGA Player of the Year	(United States) Tom Lehman	
Rookie of the Year	(United States) Tiger Woods	
Scoring leader (PGA Tour – Byron Nelson Award)	(United States) Tom Lehman	
Scoring leader (PGA – Vardon Trophy)	(United States) Tom Lehman	
Comeback Player of the Year	(United States) Steve Jones	

== See also ==
- 1996 Nike Tour
- 1996 Senior PGA Tour
