= Carl Watts (golfer) =

English professional golfer

Personal information
- Nationality: England
- Born: 22 August 1971 (age 55) Brighton, England
- Height: 5 ft 9 in (1.75 m)

Career
- Sport: Golf
- Turned professional: 1993
- Former tours: European Tour; Challenge Tour
- Professional wins: 2

Number of wins by tour
- Challenge Tour: 2

Carl Watts (born 22 August 1971) is an English professional golfer and former European Tour player. He lost a playoff at the 1997 BMW International Open. On the Challenge Tour, he won the 1994 Open Jezequel and the 1996 Russian Open.

== Amateur career ==
Watts, from Dyke Golf Course in West Sussex, won the 1989 Boys Amateur Championship at Nairn Golf Club, beating Colin Fraser of Scotland, 5 and 3. Other highlights of his amateur career included selection for the victorious Great Britain & Ireland side in the 1989 Jacques Léglise Trophy, and representing England at the Men's Home Internationals in 1991 and 1992.

== Professional career ==
Watts turned professional in 1993 and spent three years on the Challenge Tour. He prevailed in a four-way playoff to win the Open Jezequel in France in his rookie season. In 1996, he won the Russian Open at the Moscow Country Club, setting a course record of 65. He lost a playoff at the Rolex Trophy Pro-Am in Switzerland to Dennis Edlund, after shooting a course record 63. He finished 12th in the rankings to graduate to the European Tour for 1997.

In his rookie European Tour season, he lost a playoff at the BMW International Open in Germany to Robert Karlsson. He finished 60th in the Order of Merit to keep his card, but in 1998 he finished 146th and was relegated. He spent two season on the Challenge Tour before retiring from tour in 2001.

Watts reached a career-best 276th in the Official World Golf Ranking in 1997. He became the resident teaching professional at Mannings Heath Golf & Wine Estate.

== Amateur wins ==
- 1989 Boys Amateur Championship

== Professional wins (2) ==
=== Challenge Tour wins (2) ===
No.	Date	Tournament	Winning score	Margin of victory	Runner(s)-up
1	10 Apr 1994	Open Jezequel	+10 (75-76-73-74=298)	Playoff	(Sweden) Kenny Cross, (England) John Metcalfe, (France) Dominique Nouailhac, (England) Philip Talbot
2	8 Sep 1996	Russian Open	−13 (70-65-68=203)	2 strokes	(England) John Mellor

== Playoff record ==
European Tour playoff record (0–1)

No.	Year	Tournament	Opponent	Result
1	1997	BMW International Open	(Sweden) Robert Karlsson	Lost to par on third extra hole

== Team appearances ==
Amateur

- Jacques Léglise Trophy (representing Great Britain and Ireland): 1989 (winners)
- Men's Home Internationals (representing England): 1991, 1992
