= Larry Silveira =

American professional golfer (born 1965)

Personal information
- Nationality: United States
- Born: October 12, 1965 (age 61) Walnut Creek, California, U.S.
- Height: 6 ft 0 in (1.83 m)
- Weight: 185 lb (84 kg; 13.2 st)

Career
- Sport: Golf
- College: San Jose State University; University of Arizona
- Turned professional: 1988
- Former tours: PGA Tour; Nationwide Tour
- Professional wins: 3

Number of wins by tour
- Korn Ferry Tour: 1
- Other: 2

Best results in major championships
- Masters Tournament: DNP
- PGA Championship: DNP
- U.S. Open: CUT: 1997
- The Open Championship: DNP

Larry Silveira (born October 12, 1965) is an American professional golfer who played on the PGA Tour and the Nationwide Tour.

== Amateur career ==
Silveira was originally a baseball player and played catcher for Antioch High School along with Major League Baseball pitchers Alex Sanchez and Jeff Pico.

Silveira started his college golf career at San Jose State University where he won the Pacific Coast Athletic Association (now the Big West Conference) Conference Championship as a freshman. He then transferred to the University of Arizona where he was named a First Team All American in 1987 and 1988. During his time at Arizona he won five tournaments and in 1988 he won the Pacific-10 Conference (Pac-10) (now the Pac-12 Conference) Championship and was also named the Pac-10 Player of the Year. He was inducted into the University of Arizona Sports Hall of Fame in 1993.

== Professional career ==
Silveira joined the PGA Tour in 1989, earning his Tour card through qualifying school. He struggled during his rookie year but retained his Tour card through qualifying school. In his second year on Tour he continued to struggle but again retained his card through qualifying school. In 1991 he won the Deposit Guaranty Golf Classic, an unofficial PGA Tour event, defeating Mike Nicolette and Russ Cochran in a playoff, but failed to retain his full card. In 1992 he split time between the PGA Tour and the Nationwide Tour and recorded a top-5 finish on each Tour. He played on the Nationwide Tour full-time in 1993 and recorded seven top-10 finishes including three runners-up en route to an eight place finish on the money list, good enough for a PGA Tour card for 1994. He struggled in his return to the PGA Tour and returned to the Nationwide Tour in 1995 where he recorded seven top-10 finishes including two runners-up. He picked up his first Nationwide Tour victory at the Nike San Jose Open in 1996. He rejoined the PGA Tour in 1997 after going through qualifying school for the fourth time. He struggled on Tour and returned to the Nationwide Tour in 1998 where he played sporadically until 2000.

== Professional wins (3) ==
=== Nike Tour wins (1) ===
No.	Date	Tournament	Winning score	Margin of victory	Runners-up
1	Feb 25, 1996	Nike San Jose Open	−9 (70-67-70=207) (Note: Shortened to 54 holes due to weather.)	Playoff	(United States) Stewart Cink, (United States) Bobby Elliott

Nike Tour playoff record (1–1)

No.	Year	Tournament	Opponent(s)	Result
1	1995	Nike Cleveland Open	(United States) Karl Zoller	Lost to birdie on first extra hole
2	1996	Nike San Jose Open	(United States) Stewart Cink, (United States) Bobby Elliott	Won with birdie on first extra hole

=== Other wins (2) ===
- 1988 Arizona Open
- 1991 Deposit Guaranty Golf Classic (unofficial PGA Tour event)

== See also ==
- 1988 PGA Tour Qualifying School graduates
- 1989 PGA Tour Qualifying School graduates
- 1990 PGA Tour Qualifying School graduates
- 1993 Nike Tour graduates
- 1996 PGA Tour Qualifying School graduates
