= 1998 Nike Tour =

Golf tour season

1998 Nike Tour season
- Duration: January 8, 1998 – October 25, 1998
- Number of official events: 30
- Most wins: (United States) Bob Burns (2) (United States) Robin Freeman (2) (United States) Matt Gogel (2) (United States) Joe Ogilvie (2) (United States) Charles Raulerson (2)
- Money list: (United States) Bob Burns
- Player of the Year: (United States) Bob Burns

The 1998 Nike Tour was the ninth season of the Nike Tour, the official development tour to the PGA Tour.

== Schedule ==
The following table lists official events during the 1998 season.

Date	Tournament	Location	Purse (US$)	Winner (Note: The number in parentheses after each winner's name is the number of Nike Tour events they had won up to and including that tournament. This information is only shown for Nike Tour members. It is rare for someone to accumulate many wins on the Nike Tour as success at this level usually leads to promotion to the PGA Tour.)	Notes
Jan 11	Nike Lakeland Classic	Florida	225,000	(United States) Casey Martin (1)	
Jan 18	Nike South Florida Open	Florida	225,000	(United States) Eric Johnson (2)	New tournament
Feb 8	Nike Greater Austin Open	Texas	225,000	(United States) Michael Allen (1)	
Mar 22	Nike Monterrey Open	Mexico	250,000	(United States) Joe Ogilvie (1)	
Mar 29	Nike Louisiana Open	Louisiana	300,000	(United States) John Wilson (1)	
Apr 12	Nike Shreveport Open	Louisiana	225,000	(United States) Vance Veazey (1)	
Apr 19	Nike Upstate Classic	South Carolina	225,000	(United States) Tom Scherrer (2)	
Apr 26	Nike Huntsville Open	Alabama	225,000	(United States) Dennis Paulson (1)	
May 3	Nike South Carolina Classic	South Carolina	225,000	(United States) Gene Sauers (1)	
May 10	Nike Carolina Classic	North Carolina	225,000	(United States) Brian Bateman (1)	
May 17	Nike Dominion Open	Virginia	225,000	(United States) Bob Burns (1)	
May 31	Nike Knoxville Open	Tennessee	225,000	(United States) Robin Freeman (1)	
Jun 7	Nike Miami Valley Open	Ohio	225,000	(United States) Craig Bowden (1)	
Jun 14	Nike Cleveland Open	Ohio	225,000	(United States) Doug Dunakey (1)	
Jun 21	Nike Lehigh Valley Open	Pennsylvania	225,000	(United States) Eric Booker (2)	New tournament
Jun 28	Nike Greensboro Open	North Carolina	225,000	(United States) Joe Ogilvie (2)	New tournament
Jul 5	Nike Hershey Open	Pennsylvania	225,000	(United States) Michael Clark II (2)	
Jul 19	Nike St. Louis Golf Classic	Missouri	225,000	(United States) Chris Starkjohann (1)	
Jul 26	Nike Wichita Open	Kansas	225,000	(United States) Emlyn Aubrey (2)	
Aug 2	Nike Dakota Dunes Open	South Dakota	325,000	(United States) John Maginnes (2)	
Aug 9	Nike Omaha Classic	Nebraska	250,000	(United States) Matt Gogel (3)	
Aug 16	Nike Ozarks Open	Missouri	225,000	(Australia) Anthony Painter (1)	
Aug 23	Nike Fort Smith Classic	Arkansas	225,000	(Australia) Mark Hensby (1)	New tournament
Aug 30	Nike Permian Basin Open	Texas	225,000	(United States) Stiles Mitchell (1)	
Sep 13	Nike Tri-Cities Open	Washington	225,000	(United States) Matt Gogel (4)	
Sep 20	Nike Boise Open	Idaho	300,000	(United States) Mike Sposa (1)	
Sep 27	Nike Oregon Classic	Oregon	225,000	(United States) Charles Raulerson (1)	New tournament
Oct 4	Nike San Jose Open	California	225,000	(United States) Robin Freeman (2)	
Oct 11	Nike Inland Empire Open	California	225,000	(United States) Charles Raulerson (2)	
Oct 25	Nike Tour Championship	Alabama	300,000	(United States) Bob Burns (2)	Tour Championship

== Money list ==
The money list was based on prize money won during the season, calculated in U.S. dollars. The top 15 players on the money list earned status to play on the 1999 PGA Tour.

Position	Player	Prize money ($)
1	(United States) Bob Burns	178,664
2	(United States) Robin Freeman	169,389
3	(United States) Joe Ogilvie	157,812
4	(United States) Eric Booker	153,526
5	(United States) John Maginnes	145,210

== Awards ==
Award	Winner	Ref.
Player of the Year (Jack Nicklaus Trophy)	(United States) Bob Burns	
