= Michael Bradley (golfer) =

American professional golfer (born 1966)

Personal information
- Full name: Michael John Bradley
- Nationality: United States
- Born: July 17, 1966 (age 60) Largo, Florida, U.S.
- Height: 6 ft 0 in (1.83 m)
- Weight: 200 lb (91 kg; 14 st)

Career
- Sport: Golf
- College: Oklahoma State
- Turned professional: 1988
- Current tour: PGA Tour Champions
- Former tours: PGA Tour; Nationwide Tour; Canadian Tour
- Professional wins: 6
- Highest ranking: 36 (May 25, 1997)

Number of wins by tour
- PGA Tour: 4
- Other: 2

Best results in major championships
- Masters Tournament: 29th: 1998
- PGA Championship: T31: 1996
- U.S. Open: T50: 1996
- The Open Championship: T38: 1997

Michael John Bradley (born July 17, 1966) is an American professional golfer.

== Early life and amateur career ==
Bradley was born in Largo, Florida. He attended Oklahoma State University.

== Professional career ==
In 1988, Bradley turned pro. After turning professional, Bradley joined the Canadian Tour. He won the 1989 Ontario Open and the 1990 Quebec Open. He also shot a 59 in an event in Saskatoon, Saskatchewan.

Bradley earned his PGA Tour card through qualifying school in 1992 and played full-time from 1993 to 2000. He won the 1996 Buick Challenge and the 1998 Doral-Ryder Open. 1996 was his best year on the PGA Tour, where he finished in 20th on the money list while recording a win and a runner-up finish. In 1995, he had a notable PGA Championship, becoming one of the few players ever to shoot 63 in the first round of a major; however, Bradley's hot streak then tailed off and he was not among the championship's leaders by Sunday.

For the remainder of his career, he split his playing time between the PGA Tour and its developmental tour. In 2009, he won his third PGA Tour event at the Puerto Rico Open. This gave him a two-year exemption on the PGA Tour, an exemption he extended when he repeated his win at the same event in 2011. After 2013, Bradley could not produce favorable results and played a limited PGA Tour schedule out of the Past Champions category until he joined PGA Tour Champions after turning 50.

== Professional wins (6) ==
=== PGA Tour wins (4) ===
No.	Date	Tournament	Winning score	Margin of victory	Runner(s)-up
1	Sep 27, 1996	Buick Challenge	−10 (66-68=134) (Note: Shortened to 36 holes due to weather.)	Playoff	(United States) Fred Funk, (United States) Davis Love III, (United States) John Maginnes, (United States) Len Mattiace
2	Mar 8, 1998	Doral-Ryder Open	−10 (67-66-70-71=278)	1 stroke	(United States) John Huston, (United States) Billy Mayfair
3	Mar 15, 2009	Puerto Rico Open	−14 (67-69-68-70=274)	1 stroke	(Australia) Jason Day, (United States) Brett Quigley
4	Mar 13, 2011	Puerto Rico Open (2)	−16 (68-68-68-68=272)	Playoff	(United States) Troy Matteson

PGA Tour playoff record (2–0)

No.	Year	Tournament	Opponent(s)	Result
1	1996	Buick Challenge	(United States) Fred Funk, (United States) Davis Love III, (United States) John Maginnes, (United States) Len Mattiace	Won with birdie on first extra hole
2	2011	Puerto Rico Open	(United States) Troy Matteson	Won with par on first extra hole

=== Canadian Tour wins (2) ===
No.	Date	Tournament	Winning score	Margin of victory	Runner(s)-up
1	Aug 6, 1989	Timex-Bic Ontario Open	−10 (72-68-69-69=278)	1 stroke	(Canada) Rick Gibson, (New Zealand) Grant Waite
2	Aug 19, 1990	Quebec Open	−16 (67-69-69-67=272)	2 strokes	(United States) Louis Brown

== Results in major championships ==
Tournament	1990	1991	1992	1993	1994	1995	1996	1997	1998	1999
Masters Tournament								CUT	29	
U.S. Open	CUT		CUT		CUT		T50	CUT		
The Open Championship								T38		
PGA Championship						T54	T31	T71		

Tournament	2000	2001	2002	2003	2004	2005	2006	2007	2008	2009	2010	2011
Masters Tournament												
U.S. Open												
The Open Championship												
PGA Championship										CUT		T59

Did not play

CUT = missed the half-way cut
"T" = tied

== Results in The Players Championship ==
Tournament	1994	1995	1996	1997	1998	1999	2000	2001	2002	2003	2004	2005	2006	2007	2008	2009	2010	2011	2012
The Players Championship	CUT	T29	T19	T14	T51	CUT										CUT	CUT	CUT	CUT

Did not play

CUT = missed the halfway cut
"T" indicates a tie for a place

== Results in World Golf Championships ==
Tournament	1999
Match Play	R32
Championship	
Invitational	

Did not play

QF, R16, R32, R64 = Round in which player lost in match play

== See also ==
- 1992 PGA Tour Qualifying School graduates
- 2006 PGA Tour Qualifying School graduates
