= Tom Scherrer =

American professional golfe (born 1970)

Personal information
- Full name: Thomas Cregg Scherrer
- Nationality: United States
- Born: July 20, 1970 (age 56) Syracuse, New York, U.S.
- Height: 6 ft 0 in (1.83 m)
- Weight: 210 lb (95 kg; 15 st)

Career
- Sport: Golf
- College: North Carolina
- Turned professional: 1992
- Current tour: Nationwide Tour
- Former tour: PGA Tour
- Professional wins: 4
- Highest ranking: 75 (October 8, 2000)

Number of wins by tour
- PGA Tour: 1
- Korn Ferry Tour: 3

Best results in major championships
- Masters Tournament: 25th: 2001
- PGA Championship: WD: 2000
- U.S. Open: T23: 1999
- The Open Championship: CUT: 2000

Thomas Cregg Scherrer (born July 20, 1970) is an American professional golfer.

== Early life and amateur career ==
Scherrer was born in Syracuse, New York and grew up in Skaneateles, New York. He attended the University of North Carolina at Chapel Hill. He played for the American team in the 1991 Walker Cup. He lost to Justin Leonard in the finals of the 1992 U.S. Amateur.

== Professional career ==
In 1992, Scherrer turned professional. He has spent a relatively equal amount of time on the PGA Tour and Nationwide Tour. He was a member of the PGA Tour in 1996, 1999–2003, and in 2008; he played on the Nationwide Tour from 1994–1995, 1997–1998, 2004–2007 and in 2009. He has one PGA Tour victory, the 2000 Kemper Insurance Open and three Nationwide Tour wins.

== Amateur wins ==
- 1990 North and South Amateur

== Professional wins (4) ==
=== PGA Tour wins (1) ===
No.	Date	Tournament	Winning score	Margin of victory	Runners-up
1	Jun 5, 2000	Kemper Insurance Open	−13 (67-68-69-67=271)	2 strokes	(Australia) Greg Chalmers, (Japan) Kazuhiko Hosokawa, (United States) Franklin Langham, (United States) Justin Leonard, (United States) Steve Lowery

=== Nationwide Tour wins (3) ===
No.	Date	Tournament	Winning score	Margin of victory	Runner-up
1	May 21, 1995	Nike Knoxville Open	−13 (71-69-68-67=275)	Playoff	(United States) Mike Sposa
2	Apr 19, 1998	Nike Upstate Classic	−16 (67-67-66=200) (Note: Shortened to 54 holes due to weather.)	1 stroke	(United States) J. L. Lewis
3	Jul 22, 2007	Price Cutter Charity Championship	−26 (66-63-66-67=262)	4 strokes	(United States) Franklin Langham

Nationwide Tour playoff record (1–4)

No.	Year	Tournament	Opponent(s)	Result
1	1994	Nike Cleveland Open	(United States) Tommy Armour III, (United States) Scott Gump	Armour won with birdie on first extra hole
2	1995	Nike Knoxville Open	(United States) Mike Sposa	Won with birdie on first extra hole
3	1995	Nike Greater Greenville Classic	(United States) David Toms	Lost to birdie on first extra hole
4	1995	Nike Dominion Open	(United States) Hugh Royer III	Lost to birdie on first extra hole
5	1998	Nike San Jose Open	(United States) Robin Freeman, (United States) Sean Murphy	Freeman won with birdie on fourth extra hole

== Results in major championships ==
Tournament	1999	2000	2001
Masters Tournament			25
U.S. Open	T23		
The Open Championship		CUT	
PGA Championship		WD	

Did not play

CUT = missed the half-way cut
WD = withdrew from tournament
"T" = tied

== Results in The Players Championship ==
Tournament	1996	1997	1998	1999	2000	2001	2002
The Players Championship	CUT				CUT	CUT	CUT

Did not play

CUT = missed the halfway cut

== Results in World Golf Championships ==
Tournament	2001
Match Play	R64
Championship	NT^{1}
Invitational	

^{1}Cancelled due to 9/11

Did not play

QF, R16, R32, R64 = Round in which player lost in match play
NT = No tournament

== U.S. national team appearances ==
Amateur

- Walker Cup: 1991 (winners)

== See also ==
- 1995 Nike Tour graduates
- 1998 Nike Tour graduates
- 2007 Nationwide Tour graduates
