= John Wilson (golfer) =

American golfer (born 1959)

Personal information
- Nationality: United States
- Born: February 23, 1959 (age 67) Ceres, California, U.S.
- Height: 6 ft 1 in (1.85 m)
- Weight: 165 lb (75 kg; 11.8 st)

Career
- Sport: Golf
- College: College of the Desert
- Turned professional: 1987
- Former tours: PGA Tour; Nationwide Tour
- Professional wins: 3

Number of wins by tour
- Korn Ferry Tour: 2
- Other: 1

Best results in major championships
- Masters Tournament: DNP
- PGA Championship: CUT: 1996
- U.S. Open: CUT: 1991
- The Open Championship: DNP

John Wilson (born February 23, 1959) is an American professional golfer.

== Career ==
Wilson was born in Ceres, California.

In 1987, Wilson turned professional. He played on the Nationwide Tour in 1992 and from 1998 to 2001, winning twice: the 1998 Nike Louisiana Open and the 1999 Nike Dayton Open. He played on the PGA Tour in 1991 and from 1994 to 1997. His best finish on this tour was T-4 at the 1994 Anheuser-Busch Golf Classic and the 1996 Phoenix Open.

== Professional wins (3) ==
=== Nike Tour wins (2) ===
No.	Date	Tournament	Winning score	Margin of victory	Runner-up
1	Mar 29, 1998	Nike Louisiana Open	−14 (73-65-67-69=274)	5 strokes	(United States) Steve Flesch
2	Jun 20, 1999	Nike Dayton Open	−20 (68-66-66-68=268)	1 stroke	(United States) Brian Tennyson

Nike Tour playoff record (0–2)

No.	Year	Tournament	Opponent(s)	Result
1	1991	Ben Hogan Gulf Coast Classic	(United States) Tim Straub, (United States) Tom Lehman	Lehman won with par on eighth extra hole Straub eliminated by par on first hole
2	1998	Nike Shreveport Open	(United States) Vance Veazey	Lost to birdie on first extra hole

=== Other wins (1) ===
- 2003 California State Open

== See also ==
- 1990 PGA Tour Qualifying School graduates
- 1993 PGA Tour Qualifying School graduates
