= Bob Burns (golfer) =

American professional golfer

Personal information
- Full name: Robert Donald Burns
- Nationality: United States
- Born: April 5, 1968 (age 58) Mission Hills, California, U.S.
- Height: 5 ft 8 in (1.73 m)
- Weight: 165 lb (75 kg; 11.8 st)

Career
- Sport: Golf
- College: Cal State Northridge
- Turned professional: 1991
- Former tours: PGA Tour; Nike Tour
- Professional wins: 4
- Highest ranking: 89 (January 12, 2003)

Number of wins by tour
- PGA Tour: 1
- Korn Ferry Tour: 2
- Other: 1

Best results in major championships
- Masters Tournament: DNP
- PGA Championship: 67th: 2003
- U.S. Open: T51: 1995
- The Open Championship: DNP

Achievements and awards
- Nike Tour money list winner: 1998
- Nike Tour Player of the Year: 1998

Robert Donald Burns (born April 5, 1968) is an American professional golfer. Burns has played on the PGA Tour and the Nationwide Tour.

== Early life ==
Burns was born in Mission Hills, California. Burns went to John F. Kennedy High school located in the San Fernando Valley.

== Amateur career ==
He attended college at Cal State Northridge and was a member of the golf team. He won All-American honors his junior year, and was the individual medalist at the 1990 NCAA Division II Championship.

== Professional career ==
Burns turned pro in 1991 and joined the PGA Tour in 1994. During Burns's first month on the PGA Tour, his home in Northridge, California was rocked by the destructive 1994 Northridge earthquake. He ended his rookie season 101st on the money list but failed to qualify for the PGA Tour for 1995 by a single stroke, and spent the next two years on the Nike Tour (now Nationwide Tour). His career hit a low-point in 1997 when he failed to qualify for either tour. In 1998, his fortunes improved dramatically when he won two tournaments and finished first on the Nike Tour money list with $178,664 in earnings.

Burns regained his PGA Tour card for the following season and continued to improve his game. In 2002, he won the Disney Golf Classic and earned over a million dollars in a single season for the first time in his career. His career took another downturn, however, and he was back on the Nationwide Tour in 2005 after failing to qualify by a single shot.

== Professional wins (4) ==
=== PGA Tour wins (1) ===
No.	Date	Tournament	Winning score	Margin of victory	Runner-up
1	Oct 20, 2002	Disney Golf Classic	−25 (63-68-67-65=263)	1 stroke	(United States) Chris DiMarco

=== Nike Tour wins (2) ===
Legend
Tour Championships (1)
Other Nike Tour (1)

No.	Date	Tournament	Winning score	Margin of victory	Runner(s)-up
1	May 17, 1998	Nike Dominion Open	−14 (71-66-65-72=274)	2 strokes	(United States) Pat Bates, (United States) Eric Johnson, (United States) Perry Moss, (United States) Mike Sullivan
2	Oct 25, 1998	Nike Tour Championship	−5 (73-69-67-74=283)	3 strokes	(United States) Jeff Gove

Nike Tour playoff record (0–1)

No.	Year	Tournament	Opponent	Result
1	1992	Ben Hogan South Texas Open	(United States) Brian Henninger	Lost to birdie on first extra hole

=== Other wins (1) ===
- 1997 Long Beach Open

== Results in major championships ==
Tournament	1992	1993	1994	1995	1996	1997	1998	1999	2000	2001	2002	2003
U.S. Open	CUT			T51				T66				CUT
PGA Championship												67

Note: Burns never played in the Masters Tournament or The Open Championship

Did not play

CUT = missed the half-way cut
"T" = tied

== Results in The Players Championship ==
Tournament	1995	1996	1997	1998	1999	2000	2001	2002	2003	2004
The Players Championship	CUT						CUT		T66	T10

Top 10
Did not play

CUT = missed the halfway cut
"T" indicates a tie for a place

== Results in World Golf Championships ==
Tournament	2003
Match Play	
Championship	
Invitational	T77

Did not play

"T" = Tied

== See also ==
- 1993 PGA Tour Qualifying School graduates
- 1998 Nike Tour graduates
- 1999 PGA Tour Qualifying School graduates
- 2001 PGA Tour Qualifying School graduates
