= Robin Freeman (golfer) =

American professional golfer (born 1959)

Personal information
- Nationality: United States
- Born: May 7, 1959 (age 67) St. Charles, Missouri, U.S.
- Height: 6 ft 0 in (1.83 m)
- Weight: 180 lb (82 kg; 13 st)

Career
- Sport: Golf
- College: University of Central Oklahoma
- Turned professional: 1983
- Former tours: PGA Tour; Champions Tour
- Professional wins: 2

Number of wins by tour
- Korn Ferry Tour: 2

Best results in major championships
- Masters Tournament: DNP
- PGA Championship: T49: 1995
- U.S. Open: CUT: 1999
- The Open Championship: DNP

Robin Freeman (born May 7, 1959) is an American professional golfer. He has played on the PGA Tour, Nationwide Tour, and Champions Tour.

== Early life ==
In 1959, Freeman was born in St. Charles, Missouri. He attended the University of Central Oklahoma.

== Professional career ==
In 1983, he turned professional. Freeman began playing on the PGA Tour in 1989 after earning medalist honors at 1988 PGA Tour Qualifying School. He has bounced back and forth between the PGA Tour and its developmental tour. He won twice on the Nike Tour both in 1998. His best finish on the PGA Tour is a T-2 at the 1995 GTE Byron Nelson Classic. Freeman is the only two-time medalist at the PGA Tour Q-School (1988 and 1993). Freeman won the 1999 Puerto Rico Challenge winning in a playoff with Bobby Wadkins. Taking the first prize of $50,000 at the Wyndham El Conquistador Resort.

After turning 50 in 2009, Freeman also began playing on the Champions Tour. His best finishes are a pair of T-8s at the 2009 U.S. Senior Open and the 2010 Senior PGA Championship.

Freeman is currently the Director of Golf Instruction at Tahquitz Creek Golf Resort in Palm Springs, California.

== Awards and honors ==
In 2021, Freeman was inducted into the University of Central Oklahoma's Sports Hall of Fame.

== Professional wins (2) ==
=== Nike Tour wins (2) ===
| No. | Date | Tournament | Winning score | Margin of victory | Runner(s)-up |
|---|---|---|---|---|---|
| 1 | May 31, 1998 | Nike Knoxville Open | −18 (68-66-66-70=270) | Playoff | (United States) Ryan Howison |
| 2 | Oct 4, 1998 | Nike San Jose Open | −16 (66-71-69-66=272) | Playoff | (United States) Sean Murphy, (United States) Tom Scherrer |

Nike Tour playoff record (2–0)

| No. | Year | Tournament | Opponent(s) | Result |
|---|---|---|---|---|
| 1 | 1998 | Nike Knoxville Open | (United States) Ryan Howison | Won with birdie on third extra hole |
| 2 | 1998 | Nike San Jose Open | (United States) Sean Murphy, (United States) Tom Scherrer | Won with birdie on fourth extra hole |

== See also ==
- 1988 PGA Tour Qualifying School graduates
- 1991 PGA Tour Qualifying School graduates
- 1992 PGA Tour Qualifying School graduates
- 1993 PGA Tour Qualifying School graduates
- 1998 Nike Tour graduates
- 1999 PGA Tour Qualifying School graduates
- 2001 PGA Tour Qualifying School graduates
