= Vic Wilk =

American golfer

Personal information
- Nationality: United States
- Born: August 30, 1960 (age 66) Los Angeles, California, U.S.
- Height: 5 ft 8 in (1.73 m)
- Weight: 145 lb (66 kg; 10.4 st)

Career
- Sport: Golf
- College: California State University, Northridge
- Turned professional: 1982
- Former tour: Nationwide Tour
- Professional wins: 3

Number of wins by tour
- Korn Ferry Tour: 1
- Other: 2

Vic Wilk (born August 30, 1960) is an American professional golfer

== Early life ==
Wilk is a three time Junior World Golf Championships winning titles in 1969, 1971 and 1973 in two different age divisions. He was one of the dominant junior players in Southern California winning over 100 tournaments by age 17. He was also a state ranked junior tennis player.

Wilk was also a model and child actor during his adolescent years and appeared in several films and popular TV commercials during the 1970s.

== Amateur career ==
Wilk was a four time Division II All-American and won the NCAA Division II Championship in 1982. He attended California State University, Northridge and was inducted into the CSUN sports Hall of Fame in 1990.

== Professional career ==
Wilk's pro career has spanned over 21 years playing events in 18 countries. His most notable win came at the 1994 Nike Knoxville Open, the first left-handed golfer to win on what was then the Nike Tour. Other notable wins include the 2002 Nevada Open and the 1991 Ft McMurray Rotary Classic on the Canadian Tour.

Wilk has established himself as a top golf instructor in Nevada having trained under Mac O'Grady, Greg McHatton, Hank Johnson, Paul Runyan and Stan Utley.

Wilk has been a consultant for the Traditional rules of golf (TRGA) and has been a contributing author and part of the TRGA brain trust.

== Personal life ==
Wilk lives in Las Vegas with his wife and daughter.

== Professional wins (1) ==
=== Nike Tour wins (1) ===
No.	Date	Tournament	Winning score	Margin of victory	Runner-up
1	May 29, 1994	Nike Knoxville Open	−9 (70-71-68-66=275)	1 stroke	(United States) Bill Murchison

== See also ==
- Wilk – people with the surname Wilk
