= Chris Patton (disambiguation) =

Chris Patton is an American voice actor.

Chris Patton may also refer to:

- Chris Patton (golfer) (born 1967), American golfer
- Chris Patten (born 1944), British politician
