= Danny Briggs (golfer) =

American professional golfer (born 1960)

Personal information
- Nationality: United States
- Born: November 30, 1960 (age 65) Abilene, Texas, U.S.
- Height: 5 ft 9 in (1.75 m)
- Weight: 175 lb (79 kg; 12.5 st)

Career
- Sport: Golf
- College: Texas A&M
- Turned professional: 1985
- Former tours: PGA Tour; Web.com Tour
- Professional wins: 3

Danny Briggs (born November 30, 1960) is an American professional golfer who has spent several years on the PGA Tour.

== Amateur career ==
At Texas A&M, Briggs was a three-time All-American and three-time All-Southwest Conference. In 1982, Briggs led the Aggies to the team conference title and a 4th-place finish at the NCAA Championships while finishing as the individual conference champion and 8th place individually in the NCAA. Briggs graduated in 1983.

== Professional career ==
Briggs was a member of the PGA Tour in 1986, 1988, 1999, 2000, 2004, and 2005. Briggs has also spent a large number of years on the Web.com Tour and has played in several Champions Tour events.

His best finish on the PGA Tour was tied for third at the 1986 Tallahassee Open. On the Web.com Tour, he has finished in second place four times: 1993 Nike Tour Championship, 1994 Nike Central Georgia Open, 1995 Nike Inland Empire Open, and 2001 Buy.com Utah Classic

== Professional wins (3) ==
- 1993 Arizona Open
- 1995 Arizona Open
- 1997 Arizona Open

== Playoff record ==
Nike Tour playoff record (0–1)

No.	Year	Tournament	Opponents	Result
1	1994	Nike Central Georgia Open	(United States) Bill Murchison, (United States) Rick Pearson, (United States) Charlie Rymer	Pearson won with birdie on second extra hole

== See also ==
- 1985 PGA Tour Qualifying School graduates
- 1987 PGA Tour Qualifying School graduates
- 1998 PGA Tour Qualifying School graduates
- 2003 PGA Tour Qualifying School graduates
- 2004 PGA Tour Qualifying School graduates
