= Mark Christopher Charity Classic =

Golf tournament on the Nationwide Tour

Tournament information
- Location: Rancho Cucamonga, California
- Established: 1994
- Course: Empire Lakes Golf Course
- Par: 71
- Length: 7,017 yards (6,416 m)
- Tour: Nationwide Tour
- Format: Stroke play
- Prize fund: US$525,000
- Month played: October
- Final year: 2007

Tournament record score
- Aggregate: 267 Brad Elder (1999); 267 Rod Pampling (2001); 267 D. A. Points (2001); 267 Mark Wurtz (2001)
- To par: −21 as above

Final champion
- (Wales) Richard Johnson
- Location in the United States Location in California

The Mark Christopher Charity Classic presented by County of San Bernardino was a golf tournament on the Nationwide Tour. It is played from 1994 to 2007. It was last played at Empire Lakes Golf Course in Rancho Cucamonga, California, United States.

The 2007 purse was $525,000, with $94,500 going to the winner.

== Winners ==
Year	Winner	Score	To par	Margin of victory	Runner(s)-up
Mark Christopher Charity Classic
2007	(Wales) Richard Johnson	273	−11	Playoff	(United States) Jeremy Anderson (Australia) Matt Jones
2006	(United States) Kevin Na	268	−16	3 strokes	(United States) Jeff Quinney (United States) Chris Tidland
2005	(United States) Troy Matteson	271	−13	2 strokes	(Australia) Mathew Goggin (United States) Spike McRoy (United States) Johnson Wagner
2004	(United States) Scott Dunlap	272	−12	3 strokes	(United States) Scott Gutschewski (United States) Bubba Watson
2003	(United States) James Oh	268	−16	Playoff	(United States) Jess Daley
State Farm Open
2002	(United States) Andy Miller	272	−12	Playoff	(United States) Doug Garwood (United States) John Restino (United States) Dave Stockton Jr.
Buy.com Inland Empire Open
2001	(United States) D. A. Points	267	−21	Playoff	(Australia) Rod Pampling (United States) Mark Wurtz
2000	(United States) Scott Petersen	268	−20	4 strokes	(United States) Keith Clearwater (United States) Craig Kanada (United States) Chris Smith
Nike Inland Empire Open
1999	(United States) Brad Elder	267	−21	3 strokes	(United States) Dick Mast
1998	(United States) Charles Raulerson	268	−20	3 strokes	(United States) Jay Williamson
1997	(United States) Mark Carnevale	274	−14	2 strokes	(United States) David Jackson
1996	(United States) Jim Estes	272	−16	1 stroke	(United States) Rob Moss
1995	(United States) Jeff Brehaut	204	−12	1 stroke	(United States) Danny Briggs (United States) David Toms
1994	(United States) Skip Kendall	197 (Note: Shortened to 54 holes due to rain.)	−19	6 strokes	(United States) Emlyn Aubrey
