= P. H. Horgan III =

American professional golfer (born 1960)

Personal information
- Full name: Patrick H. Horgan III
- Nationality: United States
- Born: August 22, 1960 (age 66) Newport, Rhode Island, U.S.
- Height: 5 ft 10 in (1.78 m)
- Weight: 170 lb (77 kg; 12 st)

Career
- Sport: Golf
- College: University of Rhode Island
- Turned professional: 1984
- Current tour: Champions Tour
- Former tours: PGA Tour; Nationwide Tour
- Professional wins: 10

Number of wins by tour
- Korn Ferry Tour: 3
- Other: 7

Best results in major championships
- Masters Tournament: DNP
- PGA Championship: T44: 1998
- U.S. Open: CUT: 1987, 1989, 1994
- The Open Championship: DNP

Patrick H. Horgan III (born August 22, 1960) is an American professional golfer who played on the PGA Tour and the Nationwide Tour.

== Career ==
Horgan was born in Newport, Rhode Island. He attended the University of Rhode Island on a football scholarship before switching to golf. He turned professional in 1984.

Horgan was a member of the PGA Tour from 1989–94 and 1997–2000 and was a member of the Nationwide Tour in 1991, 1994–96 and 2003-05. He won three events on the Nationwide Tour and his best finish on the Nationwide Tour money list was 7th in 1996 when he recorded nine top-10 finishes. He also won the Rhode Island Open in 1994.

Horgan was involved in one of the more unusual disqualifications seen in the PGA Tour. He shot an opening round 71 in the 1998 Buick Open, but had forgotten to register for the tournament and was disqualified after the round.

Horgan qualified for the 2012 Champions Tour after finishing fifth at qualifying school. In May 2017, Horgan qualified for the 2017 U.S. Senior Open by carding a 71 at the Legacy Golf Club in Port St. Lucie. He was one of only two players under par for the sectional qualifier.

== Professional wins (10) ==
=== Nike Tour wins (3) ===
No.	Date	Tournament	Winning score	Margin of victory	Runner(s)-up
1	Feb 10, 1991	Ben Hogan Yuma Open	−17 (67-64-65=196)	2 strokes	(United States) Olin Browne, (United States) Steve Lowery
2	Apr 28, 1991	Ben Hogan Macon Open	−15 (64-68-69=201)	Playoff	(United States) Michael Miles
3	Apr 21, 1996	Nike Alabama Classic	−14 (68-67-67=202) (Note: Shortened to 54 holes due to weather.)	1 stroke	(United States) Jack O'Keefe

Nike Tour playoff record (1–2)

No.	Year	Tournament	Opponent(s)	Result
1	1991	Ben Hogan Macon Open	(United States) Michael Miles	Won with par on first extra hole
2	1995	Nike Ozarks Open	(Australia) Stuart Appleby, (United States) Mike Schuchart	Schuchart won with birdie on second extra hole
3	1996	Nike Tallahassee Open	(United States) P. J. Cowan	Lost to birdie on first extra hole

=== Other wins (7) ===
- 1994 Rhode Island Open
- 1986 Bermuda Open
- 2003 Bermuda Open
- 2004 Bermuda Open
- 2004 Goslings Invitational
- 2006 Goslings Invitational
- 2014 Goslings Invitational

== Results in major championships ==
Tournament	1987	1988	1989	1990	1991	1992	1993	1994	1995	1996	1997	1998
U.S. Open	CUT		CUT					CUT				
PGA Championship												T44

Did not play

CUT = missed the half-way cut
"T" = tied
Note: Horgan never played in the Masters Tournament or The Open Championship.

== See also ==
- 1988 PGA Tour Qualifying School graduates
- 1989 PGA Tour Qualifying School graduates
- 1991 Ben Hogan Tour graduates
- 1996 Nike Tour graduates
- 1998 PGA Tour Qualifying School graduates
