= Alan Pate =

American golfer (born 1953)

Personal information
- Nationality: United States
- Born: January 19, 1953 (age 73) Mobile, Alabama, U.S.
- Height: 6 ft 0 in (1.83 m)
- Weight: 200 lb (91 kg; 14 st)

Career
- Sport: Golf
- College: University of Alabama
- Turned professional: 1976
- Former tours: PGA Tour; Nationwide Tour
- Professional wins: 1

Number of wins by tour
- Korn Ferry Tour: 1

Best results in major championships
- Masters Tournament: DNP
- PGA Championship: DNP
- U.S. Open: CUT: 1978, 1980
- The Open Championship: DNP

Alan Pate (born January 19, 1953) is an American professional golfer who played on the PGA Tour and the Nationwide Tour.

== Early life and amateur career ==
Pate was born in Mobile, Alabama. He played college golf at the University of Alabama, where he was an All-American in 1973.

== Professional career ==
In 1976, Pate turned professional. Throughout his career, Pate played on the PGA Tour (1977–79), Nationwide Tour (1990, 1993–94, 1996–97), European Tour, Sunshine Tour and the South American Tour. He won the Nike Dakota Dunes Open on the Nationwide Tour in 1993. On the PGA Tour, his best finish was T-5 at the 1978 Kemper Open.

== Professional wins (1) ==
=== Nike Tour wins (1) ===
No.	Date	Tournament	Winning score	Margin of victory	Runner-up
1	Jul 18, 1993	Nike Dakota Dunes Open	−16 (69-65-61-65=260)	1 stroke	(United States) Stan Utley

== Playoff record ==
Southern Africa Tour playoff record (0–1)

No.	Year	Tournament	Opponent	Result
1	1988	Helix Swazi Sun Classic	(United States) Don Levin	Lost to par on first extra hole

== Results in major championships ==
Tournament	1978	1979	1980
U.S. Open	CUT		CUT

Did not play

CUT = missed the half-way cut
Note: Pate only played in the U.S. Open.

== See also ==
- Spring 1977 PGA Tour Qualifying School graduates
