= Bill Murchison =

American professional golfer (born 1956)

Personal information
- Full name: William J. Murchison Jr.
- Nationality: United States
- Born: August 2, 1956 (age 70) Lake Charles, Louisiana, U.S.
- Spouse: Karen M. Murchison
- Children: 10

Career
- Sport: Golf
- College: Texas Christian University
- Turned professional: 1977
- Former tour: PGA Tour
- Professional wins: 1

Number of wins by tour
- Korn Ferry Tour: 1

Best results in major championships
- Masters Tournament: DNP
- PGA Championship: DNP
- U.S. Open: T60: 1996
- The Open Championship: DNP

William J. Murchison Jr. (born August 2, 1956) is an American professional golfer.

== Early life ==
In 1956, Murchison was born in Lake Charles, Louisiana. He grew up primarily in Iran, however, where his father worked for an oil consortium. His family spent fifteen years in the country, living in Aghajari, Masjed Soleyman, Tehran, and Ahwaz. He also learned to play golf in Iran, playing on oil/sand greens and dirt fairways.

Murchison attended college at Texas Christian University.

== Professional career ==
In 1977, Murchison turned professional. He was successful at Spring 1978 PGA Tour Qualifying School graduates. Murchison played on tour for three season but did not have much success. His only top-25 was at the 1980 B.C. Open. Murchison was successful again 1982 PGA Tour Qualifying School. However, in 1983 he only made the cut in 12 of 27 events and dropped off tour.

During this era, when off tour, Murchison played extensively on the minitours. He won a total of thirty-four professional events on various tours, including the Spacecoast, North Florida PGA, and Mid-Atlantic Tour. In 1979, Murchison shot his career low round of 61, shot at the Goodyear Golf Club during a tournament on the National Golf Tour.

In the 1990s, Murchison played on the PGA Tour's developmental tour. His greatest success was a victory at the 1995 Nike Tallahassee Open. In addition, Murchison was briefly a member of the PGA Tour during this era, playing the 1993 season and participating in the 1995 U.S. Open and the 1996 U.S. Open.

=== Later career ===
In 1995, Murchison had a call from God to plant churches, and retired from professional golf to plant a church in Acworth, Georgia. While pastoring the church, he also served as a chaplain at the Cobb County Adult Detention Center. In 2010, Murchison planted the East Mountain Vineyard Church in Edgewood, New Mexico. After establishing that church, he started the Connection Church of Albuquerque. In 2021, Murchison moved to Rome, Georgia, and is planting the Connection Church of Rome.

In addition, Murchison served as the president and CEO of Murchison Drilling Schools, a company founded by his father, that trains oil field drilling personnel. They provide training in drilling operations and well control. Murchison Drilling Schools was sold to Well Academy in January 2020, and the name was changed to Well Academy Murchison. Murchison stayed on as the GM through January 2022.

== Personal life ==
Murchison is married to Karen. They have ten children.

One of his sons, Bill Murchison III, is a PGA assistant pro at Towne Lake Hills Golf Club in Woodstock, Georgia. He played in the 2012 PGA Championship.

== Professional wins (1) ==
=== Nike Tour wins (1) ===
No.	Date	Tournament	Winning score	Margin of victory	Runners-up
1	Apr 16, 1995	Nike Tallahassee Open	−12 (72-70-67-67=276)	5 strokes	(United States) Olin Browne, (United States) Tom Byrum, (United States) Peter Persons

Nike Tour playoff record (0–2)

No.	Year	Tournament	Opponent(s)	Result
1	1994	Nike Central Georgia Open	(United States) Danny Briggs, (United States) Rick Pearson, (United States) Charlie Rymer	Pearson won with birdie on second extra hole
2	1994	Nike Boise Open	(United States) Keith Fergus	Lost to birdie on second extra hole

== Results in major championships ==
Tournament	1995	1996
U.S. Open	CUT	T60

CUT = missed the half-way cut
"T" = tied
Note: Murchison only played in the U.S. Open.

== See also ==
- Spring 1978 PGA Tour Qualifying School graduates
- Fall 1979 PGA Tour Qualifying School graduates
- 1982 PGA Tour Qualifying School graduates
- 1992 PGA Tour Qualifying School graduates
