= Nike Tallahassee Open =

Golf tournament

Tournament information
- Location: Tallahassee, Florida
- Established: 1995
- Course: Golden Eagle Country Club
- Par: 72
- Tour: Nike Tour
- Format: Stroke play
- Prize fund: US$200,000
- Month played: April
- Final year: 1996

Tournament record score
- Aggregate: 276 Bill Murchison (1995)
- To par: −12 as above

Final champion
- (United States) P. J. Cowan
- Location in the United States Location in Florida

The Tallahassee Open was a golf tournament on the Nike Tour. It ran from 1995 to 1996.

It was played at the Golden Eagle Country Club in Tallahassee, Florida, and in 1996 the winner earned $36,000.

== Winners ==
Year	Winner	Score	To par	Margin of victory	Runner(s)-up	Ref
1995	(United States) Bill Murchison	276	−12	5 strokes	(United States) Olin Browne (United States) Tom Byrum (United States) Peter Persons	
1996	(United States) P. J. Cowan	279	−9	Playoff	(United States) P. H. Horgan III	
