= Mike Schuchart =

American professional golfer (born 1962)

Personal information
- Nationality: United States
- Born: April 6, 1962 (age 64) Omaha, Nebraska, U.S.
- Height: 5 ft 10 in (1.78 m)
- Weight: 160 lb (73 kg; 11 st)

Career
- Sport: Golf
- College: University of Nebraska–Lincoln
- Turned professional: 1986
- Former tours: PGA Tour; Nationwide Tour
- Professional wins: 19

Number of wins by tour
- Korn Ferry Tour: 3
- Other: 16

Best results in major championships
- Masters Tournament: DNP
- PGA Championship: CUT: 1987, 1992, 2003, 2004
- U.S. Open: CUT: 1983, 1990, 1995
- The Open Championship: DNP

Mike Schuchart (born April 6, 1962) is an American professional golfer who played on the PGA Tour and the Nationwide Tour.

== Early life and amateur career ==
In 1962, Schuchart was born in Omaha, Nebraska. He played college golf at the University of Nebraska–Lincoln for four years. He was named the Nebraska Amateur of the Year in 1984 and graduated from college the following year.

== Professional career ==
In 1986, Schuchart turned professional. Schuchart went to PGA Tour qualifying school in 1989 and did well enough to earn his tour card for 1990. He struggled in his rookie season, making only 7 of 28 cuts. He played in some tournaments on the Ben Hogan Tour, the PGA Tour's developmental tour, in 1991 and 1992 but did not play on the tour full-time.

In 1992, Schuchart returned to Q-School. He was successful at 1992 PGA Tour Qualifying School graduates. He did better on tour in 1993, making 11 of 24 cuts and recording a top-10 finish but did not do well enough to retain his tour card. He also played a few tournaments on the Nike Tour, the name of the PGA Tour's developmental tour, in 1993 and picked up his first professional victory at the Nike Panama City Beach Classic. In 1994, he played on the Nike Tour full-time in 1994 and picked up his second professional victory at the Nike Tour Championship. In 1995, he also played full-time on the Nike Tour and picked up his third victory at the Nike Ozarks Open. Schuchart continued to play on the Nike Tour until 1997, taking a hiatus in 1998 and 1999 before returning in 2000. His final year on the Nationwide Tour was 2001. He went to the PGA Tour Qualifying school in 1999l and 2000 but was not able to earn his tour card.

In 2002, he began working as an assistant coach for the University of Nebraska–Lincoln's women's golf team. Schuhart is also a teaching professional at the Wilderness Ridge Golf Club in Lincoln, Nebraska. In 2002 and 2003, Schuchart won the Nebraska Open and was named the 2003 Nebraska Teacher of the Year. In 2003, he was also the Nebraska PGA Section Club Professional Champion. He has been named the Nebraska PGA Player of the Year three times. He also represented his country in the 1992 National PGA Cup.

== Awards and honors ==
- In 1984, Schuchart was earned the Nebraska Amateur of the Year honors
- In 2003, he was awarded Nebraska Teacher of the Year
- Schuchart has been named the Nebraska PGA Player of the Year three times

== Professional wins (11) ==
=== Nike Tour wins (3) ===
Legend
Tour Championships (1)
Other Nike Tour (2)

No.	Date	Tournament	Winning score	Margin of victory	Runner(s)-up
1	Mar 28, 1993	Nike Panama City Beach Classic	−8 (69-71-68=208)	2 strokes	(United States) Ron Streck
2	Oct 16, 1994	Nike Tour Championship	−7 (69-67-68-73=277)	1 stroke	(United States) Emlyn Aubrey, (United States) Jeff Cook, (United States) Lee Rinker
3	Aug 13, 1995	Nike Ozarks Open	−17 (69-70-65-67=271)	Playoff	(Australia) Stuart Appleby, (United States) P. H. Horgan III

Nike Tour playoff record (1–0)

No.	Year	Tournament	Opponents	Result
1	1995	Nike Ozarks Open	(Australia) Stuart Appleby, (United States) P. H. Horgan III	Won with birdie on second extra hole

=== Other wins (16) ===
- 1991 Nebraska PGA Championship
- 1992 Nebraska PGA Championship
- 1997 3 events on the Prairie Golf Tour
- 1998 3 events on the Prairie Golf Tour
- 2002 Nebraska Open, Nebraska PGA Championship
- 2003 Nebraska Open, Nebraska PGA Championship
- 2005 Nebraska PGA Championship
- 2006 Nebraska PGA Championship
- 2007 Nebraska PGA Championship
- 2008 Nebraska PGA Championship

== Results in major championships ==
Tournament	1983	1984	1985	1986	1987	1988	1989
U.S. Open	CUT						
PGA Championship					CUT		

Tournament	1990	1991	1992	1993	1994	1995	1996	1997	1998	1999
U.S. Open	CUT					CUT				
PGA Championship			CUT							

Tournament	2000	2001	2002	2003	2004
U.S. Open					
PGA Championship				CUT	CUT

Note: Schuchart never played in the Masters Tournament nor The Open Championship.

Did not play

CUT = missed the half-way cut

== U.S. national team appearances ==
- PGA Cup: 1992 (winners)

== See also ==
- 1989 PGA Tour Qualifying School graduates
- 1992 PGA Tour Qualifying School graduates
