= Eric Johnson (golfer) =

American golfer (born 1962)

Personal information
- Nationality: United States
- Born: October 11, 1962 (age 64) Seaside, Oregon, U.S.
- Height: 6 ft 1 in (1.85 m)
- Weight: 190 lb (86 kg; 14 st)

Career
- Sport: Golf
- College: University of Oregon
- Turned professional: 1983
- Former tours: PGA Tour; Nike Tour; Hooters Jordan Tour
- Professional wins: 7

Number of wins by tour
- Korn Ferry Tour: 2
- Other: 5

Best results in major championships
- Masters Tournament: DNP
- PGA Championship: DNP
- U.S. Open: CUT: 1991, 1994
- The Open Championship: DNP

Eric Johnson (born October 11, 1962) is an American professional golfer.

== Career ==
Johnson was born in Seaside, Oregon. He won the 1980 U.S. Junior Amateur. He played college golf at the University of Oregon.

In 1983, Johnson turned professional. He played on the Nationwide Tour in 1993, 1995–96, and 1998–2003. He won twice on tour: the 1996 Nike Knoxville Open and the 1998 Nike South Florida Open. He played one full season on the PGA Tour in 1997 where his best finish was T-12 at the GTE Byron Nelson Golf Classic.

Johnson is a golf instructor at the RiverRidge Golf Complex in Eugene, Oregon.

== Amateur wins ==
- 1980 U.S. Junior Amateur
- 1982 Pacific Northwest Amateur

== Professional wins (7) ==
=== Nike Tour wins (2) ===
No.	Date	Tournament	Winning score	Margin of victory	Runner(s)-up
1	Jun 16, 1996	Nike Knoxville Open	−16 (68-66-69-69=272)	2 strokes	(United States) Patrick Lee, (United States) Matt Peterson
2	Jan 18, 1998	Nike South Florida Open	−13 (66-71-63-67=267)	2 strokes	(United States) Chris Riley

=== Hooters Jordan Tour wins (5) ===
No.	Date	Tournament	Winning score	Margin of victory	Runner(s)-up
1	Apr 28, 1991	Golden Hills Classic	−11 (66-69-67=202)	2 strokes	(United States) Steve Thomas
2	Jun 2, 1991	Carolina Springs Classic	−16 (67-70-66-67=272)	1 stroke	(United States) Dave Stockton Jr., (United States) Mike Tschetter, (United States) Charles Whittington
3	Jul 5, 1992	Bud Dry Classic	−13 (67-70-65-69=271)	1 stroke	(United States) John Dowdall
4	Aug 22, 1993	Pepsi Open	−18 (67-65-71-67=270)	Playoff	(United States) Charlie Rymer
5	Aug 28, 1994	John Crosland Classic	−19 (69-67-65-68=269)	7 strokes	(United States) Paul Claxton

== Results in major championships ==
Tournament	1991	1992	1993	1994
U.S. Open	CUT			CUT

CUT = missed the halfway cut
Note: Johnson only played in the U.S. Open.

== See also ==
- 1996 Nike Tour graduates
