= St. Louis Golf Classic =

Golf tournament in Missouri, 1994–1998

Nike St. Louis Golf Classic
Tournament information
- Location: St. Charles, Missouri
- Established: 1994
- Course: Missouri Bluffs Golf Course
- Par: 70
- Tour: Nike Tour
- Format: Stroke play
- Prize fund: $225,000
- Final year: 1998

Tournament record score
- Aggregate: 261 Todd Gleaton (1997)
- To par: −23 as above

Final champion
- (United States) Chris Starkjohann
- Location in the United States Location in Missouri

The St. Louis Golf Classic was a golf tournament on the Nike Tour. It ran from 1994 to 1998. From 1994 to 1996, it was played at Lake Forest Golf & Country Club in Lake St. Louis, Missouri. In 1997 and 1998, it was played at Missouri Bluffs Golf Course in St. Charles.

In 1998, the winner earned $40,500.

== Winners ==
Year	Winner	Score	To par	Margin of victory	Runner(s)-up	Winner's share ($)	Purse ($)	Ref
Nike Gateway Classic
1994	(United States) Brad Fabel	279	−9	1 stroke	(United States) Jim Carter (United States) Chris Perry	36,000	200,000	
1995	(United States) Chris Smith	203 (Note: Shortened to 54 holes due to rain.)	−13	Playoff	(Canada) Glen Hnatiuk	36,000	200,000	
1996	(United States) Tim Conley	278	−10	Playoff	(Mexico) Javier Sanchez	36,000	200,000	
Nike St. Louis Golf Classic
1997	(United States) Todd Gleaton	261	−23	3 strokes	(Canada) Ardon Knoll	36,000	200,000	
1998	(United States) Chris Starkjohann	263	−17	1 stroke	(United States) Notah Begay III	40,500	225,000	
