= Rick Pearson (golfer) =

American golfer

Personal information
- Nationality: United States
- Born: December 19, 1958 (age 67) Marianna, Florida, U.S.
- Height: 5 ft 10 in (1.78 m)
- Weight: 185 lb (84 kg; 13.2 st)

Career
- Sport: Golf
- College: University of Florida
- Turned professional: 1980
- Former tours: PGA Tour; Nike Tour
- Professional wins: 3

Number of wins by tour
- Korn Ferry Tour: 3

Best results in major championships
- Masters Tournament: DNP
- PGA Championship: DNP
- U.S. Open: CUT: 1981
- The Open Championship: DNP

Rick Pearson (born December 19, 1958) is an American professional golfer who formerly played on the PGA Tour and the Nike Tour.

== Early life and amateur career ==
In 1958, Pearson was born in Marianna, Florida. He was the first player in Florida history to win back-to-back Florida State Junior College Championship titles. Pearson won the Florida State Amateur in 1978 and 1980. He attended the University of Florida where he won the Southeastern Conference (SEC) individual title in 1980 and was voted 1980 SEC player of the year. Pearson was also recognized as a second-team All-American in 1980.

== Professional career ==
In 1980, Pearson turned professional. In 1982, Pearson joined the PGA Tour and played until the following year. He then played various tours until 1988, where he rejoined the PGA Tour for two seasons. He played on Tour until the following year but didn't find much success so he joined the Ben Hogan Tour in its inaugural year, 1990. He won the Ben Hogan Yuma Open while recording nine top-10 finishes en route to a 6th-place finish on the money list. He played on the developmental tour until 1995 and picked up two more victories, the 1992 Ben Hogan Tri-Cities Open and the 1994 Nike Central Georgia Open.

== Professional wins (3) ==
=== Nike Tour wins (3) ===
No.	Date	Tournament	Winning score	Margin of victory	Runner(s)-up
1	Feb 11, 1990	Ben Hogan Yuma Open	−15 (63-68-67=198)	2 strokes	(United States) Sean Pacetti, (United States) Sam Randolph
2	Sep 13, 1992	Ben Hogan Tri-Cities Open	−6 (68-71-71=210)	2 strokes	(United States) Curt Byrum, (United States) Mike Foster
3	May 15, 1994	Nike Central Georgia Open	−15 (71-68-65-69=273)	Playoff	(United States) Danny Briggs, (United States) Bill Murchison, (United States) Charlie Rymer

Nike Tour playoff record (1–1)

No.	Year	Tournament	Opponent(s)	Result
1	1990	Ben Hogan Gulf Coast Classic	(United States) Dick Mast	Lost to par on third extra hole
2	1994	Nike Central Georgia Open	(United States) Danny Briggs, (United States) Bill Murchison, (United States) Charlie Rymer	Won with birdie on second extra hole

== Results in major championships ==
Tournament	1981
U.S. Open	CUT

CUT = missed the half-way cut
Note: Pearson only played in the U.S. Open.

== See also ==
- Fall 1981 PGA Tour Qualifying School graduates
- 1982 PGA Tour Qualifying School graduates
- 1987 PGA Tour Qualifying School graduates
- 1988 PGA Tour Qualifying School graduates
- Florida Gators
- List of Florida Gators golfers
