= Miami Valley Open =

Golf tournament

Nike Miami Valley Open
Tournament information
- Location: Springboro, Ohio
- Established: 1993
- Course: Heatherwoode Golf Course
- Par: 70
- Tour: Nike Tour
- Format: Stroke play
- Prize fund: $225,000
- Final year: 1998

Tournament record score
- Aggregate: 262 Trevor Dodds (1997)
- To par: −22 as above

Final champion
- (United States) Craig Bowden
- Location in the United States Location in Ohio

The Miami Valley Open was a golf tournament on the Nike Tour. It ran from 1993 to 1998. It was played at Heatherwoode Golf Course in Springboro, Ohio.

In 1995, the winner earned $40,500.

== Winners ==
Year	Winner	Score	To par	Margin of victory	Runner(s)-up	Winner's share ($)	Purse ($)	Ref
Nike Miami Valley Open
1993	(United States) Emlyn Aubrey	202	−11	4 strokes	(United States) Larry Silveira	31,500	175,000	
1994	(United States) Tommy Armour III	266	−18	3 strokes	(United States) Jim Carter	36,000	200,000	
1995	(United States) Stan Utley	264	−20	4 strokes	(United States) Jon Hough (United States) Steve Jurgensen	36,000	200,000	
1996	(United States) J. P. Hayes	265	−19	2 strokes	(United States) Lee Porter (United States) Greg Whisman	36,000	200,000	
1997	(Namibia) Trevor Dodds	262	−22	6 strokes	(United States) Joe Daley	36,000	200,000	
1998	(United States) Craig Bowden	264	−16	2 strokes	(United States) Doug Dunakey (United States) Ryan Howison	40,500	225,000	
