= New Mexico Charity Classic =

Nike New Mexico Charity Classic
Tournament information
- Location: Albuquerque, New Mexico
- Established: 1993
- Course: University of New Mexico Championship Course
- Par: 72
- Tour: Nike Tour
- Format: Stroke play
- Prize fund: US$175,000
- Month played: September
- Final year: 1994

Tournament record score
- Aggregate: 262 Chris Patton (1993)
- To par: −22 as above

Final champion
- (United States) Jim Carter
- Location in the United States Location in New Mexico

The New Mexico Charity Classic was a golf tournament on the Nike Tour. It ran from 1993 to 1994. In 1993, it was played at Valle Grande Golf Course in Santa Ana Pueblo, New Mexico. In 1994, it was played at the University of New Mexico Championship Course in Albuquerque, New Mexico.

In 1994, the winner earned $31,500.

== Winners ==
Year	Winner	Score	To par	Margin of victory	Runners-up	Ref.
Nike New Mexico Charity Classic
1994	(United States) Jim Carter	272	−16	1 stroke	(United States) Emlyn Aubrey (United States) Chad Ginn	
1993	(United States) Chris Patton	262	−22	5 strokes	(United States) Doug Martin (United States) John Morse	

== See also ==
- New Mexico Classic – a later Nike Tour event
