= Tommy Moore (golfer) =

American professional golfer (1962–1998)

- Moore at 1990 USF&G Classic

Personal information
- Full name: Thomas Edward Moore
- Nationality: United States
- Born: December 23, 1962 New Orleans, Louisiana, U.S.
- Died: May 24, 1998 (aged 35) New Orleans, Louisiana, U.S.
- Height: 5 ft 9 in (1.75 m)
- Weight: 170 lb (77 kg; 12 st)
- Spouse: Tracy Moore
- Children: Mason

Career
- Sport: Golf
- College: Oklahoma State
- Turned professional: 1984
- Former tour: PGA Tour
- Professional wins: 1

Number of wins by tour
- Korn Ferry Tour: 1

Best results in major championships
- Masters Tournament: DNP
- PGA Championship: DNP
- U.S. Open: CUT: 1981, 1990
- The Open Championship: DNP

Thomas Edward Moore (December 23, 1962 – May 24, 1998) was an American professional golfer.

== Early life and amateur career ==
In 1962, Moore was born in New Orleans, Louisiana. He had a decorated junior golf career and was ranked #1 in the Junior Golf World Rankings in 1980 by Golf Digest.

Moore played college golf at Oklahoma State where he was a teammate of Scott Verplank, Willie Wood, and Philip Walton. He won two events. He was also an All-American in 1982, 1983 and 1984 and helped his team win the NCAA Championship in 1983.

== Professional career ==
In 1984, Moore turned pro. He played on the PGA Tour in 1990, 1991, and 1994. His best finish was a T4th at the 1990 Buick Southern Open. He also played on the PGA Tour's developmental tour from 1991 to 1993. He won the 1993 Nike Boise Open.

After retiring from tournament golf, Moore worked as a teaching professional at English Turn Golf and Country Club in New Orleans.

== Death and legacy ==
In 1998, Moore died at age the age of 35 from a rare blood disease diagnosed as primary amyloidosis.

The Tommy Moore Memorial Junior Golf Championship is held annually in conjunction with the All-State Sugar Bowl. The event is presented by the Kelly Gibson Foundation.

== Awards and honors ==
Moore earned All-American honors three times at Oklahoma State: in 1982, 1983 and 1984. Moore was also the university's first Academic All-American during his senior year.

== Professional wins (1) ==
=== Nike Tour wins (1) ===
No.	Date	Tournament	Winning score	Margin of victory	Runner-up
1	Sep 26, 1993	Nike Boise Open	−14 (68-67-64=199)	3 strokes	(United States) Olin Browne

Nike Tour playoff record (0–1)

No.	Year	Tournament	Opponents	Result
1	1993	Nike Utah Classic	(United States) Curt Byrum, (United States) Jim Carter, (United States) Sean Murphy	Murphy won with birdie on third extra hole Byrum and Carter eliminated by birdie on second hole

== See also ==
- 1993 Nike Tour graduates
