= Bill Sander =

American golfer (born 1956)

Personal information
- Full name: William Knox Sander
- Nationality: United States
- Born: April 16, 1956 (age 70) Seattle, Washington, U.S.
- Height: 6 ft 2 in (1.88 m)
- Weight: 185 lb (84 kg; 13.2 st)

Career
- Sport: Golf
- Turned professional: 1977
- Former tour: PGA Tour

Best results in major championships
- Masters Tournament: 49th: 1977
- PGA Championship: CUT: 1990
- U.S. Open: CUT: 1977, 1985, 1989, 1990
- The Open Championship: DNP

William Knox Sander (born April 16, 1956) is an American professional golfer.

== Amateur career ==
Sander won the 1976 U.S. Amateur. He also competed in the 1976 Eisenhower Trophy and the 1977 Walker Cup match. In 1976 he was ranked the #3 amateur in the country.

== Professional career ==
Sander played on the PGA Tour from 1979 to 1992 during his 15 years as a professional golfer. He twice finished runner-up: 1988 Los Angeles Open and 1991 Shearson Lehman Brothers Open.

== Amateur wins ==
this list may be incomplete

- 1976 U.S. Amateur, Pacific Northwest Amateur

== See also ==
- Spring 1978 PGA Tour Qualifying School graduates
- 1982 PGA Tour Qualifying School graduates
- 1983 PGA Tour Qualifying School graduates
- 1986 PGA Tour Qualifying School graduates
