= Macon Open =

Nike Central Georgia Open
Tournament information
- Location: Macon, Georgia
- Established: 1990
- Course: River North Country Club
- Par: 72
- Tour: Nike Tour
- Format: Stroke play
- Prize fund: US$200,000
- Month played: May
- Final year: 1995

Tournament record score
- Aggregate: 268 Matt Peterson (1995)
- To par: −20 as above

Final champion
- (United States) Matt Peterson
- Location in the United States Location in Georgia

The Macon Open was a golf tournament on the Nike Tour. It ran from 1990 to 1995. It was played at River North Country Club in Macon, Georgia.

In 1995 the winner earned $36,000.

== Winners ==
Year	Winner	Score	To par	Margin of victory	Runner(s)-up
Nike Central Georgia Open
1995	(United States) Matt Peterson	268	−20	2 strokes	(United States) Jeff Barlow
1994	(United States) Rick Pearson	273	−15	Playoff	(United States) Danny Briggs (United States) Bill Murchison (United States) Charlie Rymer
1993	(United States) Sean Murphy	205	−11	2 strokes	(United States) Don Walsworth
Ben Hogan Macon Open
1992	(United States) Brian Henninger	205	−11	1 stroke	(United States) Ted Tryba
1991	(United States) P. H. Horgan III	201	−15	Playoff	(United States) Michael Miles
1990	(United States) Ed Humenik	205	−11	1 stroke	(United States) Rick Pearson (United States) Roger Rowland
