= Ryan Vermeer =

American professional golfer (born 1978)

Personal information
- Nationality: United States
- Born: January 11, 1978 (age 48) Spencer, Iowa, U.S.

Career
- Sport: Golf
- College: University of Kansas
- Turned professional: 2000
- Former tour: Buy.com Tour (2001)
- Professional wins: 16

Best results in major championships
- Masters Tournament: DNP
- PGA Championship: T80: 2019
- U.S. Open: CUT: 2020
- The Open Championship: DNP

Ryan Vermeer (born January 11, 1978) is an American professional golfer. Vermeer was born in Spencer, Iowa. He played college golf at the University of Kansas from 1997 to 2000 where he won a record seven events and was All-American in 1999 and 2000. He turned professional in 2000.

Vermeer played on the Buy.com Tour (now Korn Ferry Tour) in 2001. His best finish was T-18 at the Buy.com Omaha Classic. He finished 163rd on the money list, lost his card and only played sporadically on the Web.com Tour and PGA Tour after 2001.

Vermeer became a club professional and played well enough in the PGA Professional Championship to earn spots in the PGA Championship in 2017, 2018, 2019, 2020 and 2022.

Vermeer won the 2018 PGA Professional Championship. He was the first Nebraska PGA member to win the tournament.

Vermeer made the cut at the 2019 PGA Championship, the third major he played in his career. He finished T80.

== Professional wins ==
- 2013 National Car Rental PGA Assistant Championship – Nebraska Section
- 2014 Nebraska Section PGA Match Play Championship, Mizuno Pro/Assistant Championship
- 2016 Nebraska PGA Championship, Mizuno Pro/Assistant Championship
- 2017 Nebraska Section PGA Match Play Championship, Mizuno Pro/Assistant Championship
- 2018 Nebraska Section PGA Match Play Championship, PGA Professional Championship, Nebraska PGA Championship
- 2019 TaylorMade National Championship, Nebraska PGA Championship
- 2020 Nebraska PGA Championship
- 2021 Nebraska PGA Championship
- 2022 Nebraska PGA Championship
- 2025 Nebraska PGA Championship

== Results in major championships ==
Tournament	2017	2018
U.S. Open		
PGA Championship	CUT	CUT

Tournament	2019	2020	2021	2022	2023	2024	2025	2026
PGA Championship	T80	CUT		CUT				CUT
U.S. Open		CUT						

CUT = missed the half-way cut
"T" = tied
Note: Vermeer only played in the PGA Championship and the U.S. Open.

== U.S. national team appearances ==
- PGA Cup: 2019 (winners), 2022 (winners)
