= 1987 PGA Tour Qualifying School graduates =

This is a list of the 1987 PGA Tour Qualifying School graduates. 54 players earned their 1988 PGA Tour card through Q-School in 1987. The tournament was played over 108 holes at Pine Lakes Golf Club and Matanzas Golf Club, in Palm Coast, Florida. Those earning cards split the $100,000 purse, with the winner earning $15,000. John Huston was the medallist. Jim Hallet finished in second place. After several attempts in the mid-1980s, Hallet finally made it on to the PGA Tour.

== Tournament summary ==
Several former PGA Tour winners entered the tournament trying to regain full-time status. They included Dave Eichelberger, John Fought, Barry Jaeckel, Bobby Cole, and Leonard Thompson. Eichelberger and Thompson were the only ones that were successful. Fought was disqualified in the first round for signing an incorrect scorecard.

== List of graduates ==
Place	Player	Notes
1	(United States) John Huston	
2	(United States) Jim Hallet	1987 Order of Merit winner on Asia Golf Circuit
3	(United States) Jim Booros	
T4	(United States) Bill Buttner	
T4	(United States) Bruce Zabriski	
T6	(Canada) Jim Nelford	2 runner-up finishes on PGA Tour
T6	(United States) Scott Verplank	Winner of 1984 U.S. Amateur, 1 PGA Tour win
T8	(United States) Billy Andrade	
T8	(United States) Clark Burroughs	
T8	(United States) Tommy Armour III	
T8	(United States) David Canipe	
T12	(United States) Steve Lowery	
T12	(United States) David Peoples	
T12	(United States) Bob Proben	
T12	(United States) Robert Thompson	
T16	(United States) Greg Ladehoff	
T16	(United States) Joey Rassett	
T16	(United States) Tom Sieckmann	3 Asia Golf Circuit wins
T16	(United States) Brian Tennyson	2 Asia Golf Circuit wins
T16	(United States) Leonard Thompson	2 PGA Tour wins
T16	(United States) Paul Trittler	
T22	(United States) Jim Carter	
T22	(United States) Jeff Coston	
T24	(United States) Michael Blackburn	
T24	(United States) Brandel Chamblee	
T24	(United States) Barry Cheesman	
T24	(United States) Tom Pernice Jr.	
T24	(United States) Harry Taylor	
T24	(United States) Kim Young	
T30	(United States) Mike Bender	
T30	(United States) Mark Brooks	
T30	(United States) Billy Ray Brown	
T30	(United States) Steve Thomas	
T34	(Mexico) Antonio Cerda, Jr.	
T34	(United States) Richard Cromwell	
T34	(United States) Mark Maness	
T34	(United States) Brian Mogg	
T34	(United States) Tim Norris	1 PGA Tour win
T34	(United States) Rick Pearson	
T34	(United States) John Snyder	
T41	(United States) Danny Briggs	
T41	(United States) Bill Britton	Playoff loss at 1982 Walt Disney World Golf Classic
T41	(United States) Greg Farrow	
T41	(United States) Dillard Pruitt	Winner of 1983 Sunnehanna Amateur
T41	(United States) Loren Roberts	Winner of 1979 PGA Assistant Championship
T41	(United States) Duffy Waldorf	
T47	(United States) Roy Biancalana	
T47	(United States) Brad Bryant	
T47	(United States) Jay Delsing	
T47	(United States) Dave Eichelberger	4 PGA Tour wins
T47	(United States) Mike Hammond	
T47	(United States) Jeffrey Lankford	
T47	(United States) Lance Ten Broeck	Winner of Magnolia State Classic
T47	(United States) Brett Upper	
