= Spring 1978 PGA Tour Qualifying School graduates =

This is a list of the Spring 1978 PGA Tour Qualifying School graduates. The top 25 players and ties graduated onto the PGA Tour. There were 150 players in the field.

Regional qualifying for the northeast was held at Grossinger's Country Club in Liberty, New York. The field was 50 players. Mike Zach was medallist at 286 (+2). Overall, 17 players from the northeast regional moved on to final qualifying.

Brothers Bob Byman and Ed Byman qualified for the finals. It was the 3rd attempt for Bob and the 5th attempt for Ed. Both missed qualifying by a shot the previous year. The professional Lance Ten Broeck also qualified for the finals. It was at least his second time at the PGA Tour Qualifying Tournament.

== Tournament summary ==
Final qualifying was held at University of New Mexico course in Albuquerque, New Mexico. The event was held June 7–10. A number of notable golfers with successful amateur careers attempted to qualify for the tour. They included Bill Sander, the 1976 U.S. Amateur champion, Scott Simpson, the 1976 and 1977 NCAA champion in golf, and John Fought, the 1977 U.S. Amateur champion. After two rounds, 25th place was at 143 strokes. At this point Fought was the only one inside the prospective cut-off point with 142 strokes. Sander was at 146 strokes and Simpson was at 148 strokes. Ultimately from this group, only Sander moved on.

In his third attempt at PGA Tour Qualifying School, Adam Adams, Jr. made it onto the PGA Tour. He tied for 4th place. In addition, Mike Zach, the medallist from the northeast regional, was also successful, finishing in a tie for 6th place. The Byman brothers also qualified.

== List of graduates ==
| # | Player | Notes |
|---|---|---|
| 1 | (United States) Wren Lum | |
| 2 | (United States) Mark McCumber | |
| 3 | (United States) Jim Mason | |
| T4 | (United States) Brad Bryant | |
| | (United States) Adam Adams, Jr. | |
| T6 | (United States) Bob Byman | Winner of 2 European Tour events. Winner of 1 PGA Tour of Australia event |
| | (United States) Mike Zack | |
| T8 | (United States) Rocky Thompson | |
| | (United States) Bob Impaglia | |
| | (United States) Peter Chapin | |
| | (United States) John Adams | |
| T12 | (United States) Ed Byman | |
| | (United States) Ron Mobley | |
| T14 | (United States) Dan Pohl | Two-time winner of Michigan Amateur |
| | (United States) Jim Knoll | |
| | (United States) Charley Gibson | |
| | (United States) Bill Murchison | |
| | (United States) Kip Byrne | |
| | (United States) Rocky Rockett | |
| T20 | (United States) Don Baker | |
| | (United States) Elroy Marti Jr. | |
| | (United States) Larry Degenhart | |
| | (United States) Joe Hager | |
| | (United States) Fred Voelkel | |
| | (United States) Bill Sander | |
| | (United States) Mike Bodney | |
