= White Rose Classic =

Nike White Rose Classic
Tournament information
- Location: York, Pennsylvania
- Established: 1993
- Courses: Honey Run Golf and Country Club
- Par: 72
- Tour: Nike Tour
- Format: Stroke play
- Prize fund: US$200,000
- Month played: July
- Final year: 1993

Tournament record score
- Aggregate: 270 Curt Byrum (1993)
- To par: −18 as above

Final champion
- (United States) Curt Byrum
- Location in the United States Location in Pennsylvania

The White Rose Classic was a golf tournament on the Nike Tour. It was only played in 1993. It was played at Honey Run Golf & Country Club in York, Pennsylvania.

Curt Byrum received $36,000.

== Winners ==
Year	Winner	Score	To par	Margin of victory	Runners-up
Nike White Rose Classic
1993	(United States) Curt Byrum	270	−18	1 stroke	(United States) Morris Hatalsky (United States) Gary Rusnak (Mexico) Esteban Toledo
