= Empire Lakes Golf Course =

Golf course in Rancho Cucamonga, California

Coordinates: 34.083857°N 117.564451°W

- Location in California

Club information
- Location: Rancho Cucamonga, California, U.S.
- Established: 1996
- Type: Public, daily fee
- Owner: The Lewis Group of Companies (at closure)
- Tota holes: 18
- Tournaments: Mark Christopher Charity Classic (Nationwide Tour)

Empire Lakes Golf Course
- Designed by: Arnold Palmer
- Par: 72
- Length: 7034 yd

Empire Lakes Golf Course was a public, daily fee golf course designed by Arnold Palmer located in Rancho Cucamonga, California. The course was home to the Nationwide Tour event, the Mark Christopher Charity Classic. The 18-hole, par 72 course featured a challenging 7,034 yards (6,432 m) from the black tees, fairways with water features and hills, a large bi-directional practice area and golf school, and a clubhouse and pro shop.

In late 2015, regional developer, The Lewis Group of Companies, proposed closing the golf course and redeveloping the property into 2650–3450 high-density residential units, as well as retail, commercial, and office space.

On May 18, 2016, the Rancho Cucamonga City Council certified the final Environmental Impact Report and approved the amendments to the city's General Plan and the project's Specific Plan.

The golf course was closed permanently on May 31, 2016. Construction on "The Resort" community is expected to continue for 8–10 years, and the first units were expected to be ready for occupancy as early as 2017. As of February 2020, one of the developers, The New Home Company, has announced the opening of the first model homes and units for sale in the "Nova" neighborhood of the project.
