= Nebraska PGA Championship =

The Nebraska PGA Championship is a golf tournament that is the championship of the Nebraska section of the PGA of America. Although the Nebraska section was formed in 1929, there were no section championships held until 1954. Jim White, who won the Senior PGA Professional National Championship in 2004, holds the record with 13 wins spanning five decades. Bud Williamson, long-time coach of Tom Watson, won nine times in the 1950s and 1960s. Mike Schuchart, PGA Tour player in 1990s won this tournament eight times.

== Winners ==
- 2026 Andrew Storm
- 2025 Ryan Vermeer
- 2024 Judd Cornell
- 2023 Andrew Storm
- 2022 Ryan Vermeer
- 2021 Ryan Vermeer
- 2020 Ryan Vermeer
- 2019 Ryan Vermeer
- 2018 Ryan Vermeer
- 2017 Nick Wanderscheid
- 2016 Ryan Vermeer
- 2015 Nick Wanderscheid
- 2014 Nick Wanderscheid
- 2013 Jim White
- 2012 Chris Wiemers
- 2011 Scott Holly
- 2010 Jim White
- 2009 Jim White
- 2008 Mike Schuchart
- 2007 Mike Schuchart
- 2006 Mike Schuchart
- 2005 Mike Schuchart
- 2004 Bryan Hughett
- 2003 Mike Schuchart
- 2002 Mike Schuchart
- 2001 Bret Taylor
- 2000 Jim White
- 1999 Bret Taylor
- 1998 Bryan Hughett
- 1997 Bret Taylor
- 1996 Jim White
- 1995 Rennie Sasse
- 1994 John Frillman
- 1993 Jim White
- 1992 Mike Schuchart
- 1991 Mike Schuchart
- 1990 Mike Antonio
- 1989 Jim White
- 1988 Charlie Borner
- 1987 John Norton
- 1986 John Frillman
- 1985 Jim White
- 1984 Larry Wheeler
- 1983 Jim White
- 1982 Jim White
- 1981 Jim White
- 1980 Ron Filipowicz
- 1979 Jim White
- 1978 Jim White
- 1977 Larry Wheeler
- 1976 Dave Oliphant
- 1975 John Frillman
- 1974 John Frillman
- 1973 John Frillman
- 1972 Jerry Fisher
- 1971 Merle Backlund
- 1970 John Frillman
- 1969 Merle Backlund
- 1968 Merle Backlund
- 1967 John Frillman
- 1966 Bud Williamson
- 1965 Bob Popp
- 1964 Bud Williamson
- 1963 Bud Williamson
- 1962 Bud Williamson
- 1961 Bob Popp
- 1960 Bud Williamson
- 1959 Bud Williamson
- 1958 Bud Williamson
- 1957 Bud Williamson
- 1956 Bud Williamson
- 1955 George Getchell
- 1954 George Getchell
