= Doug Garwood =

American golfer (born 1963)

Personal information
- Nationality: United States
- Born: March 31, 1963 (age 63) Van Nuys, California, U.S.
- Height: 6 ft 3 in (1.91 m)
- Weight: 195 lb (88 kg; 13.9 st)

Career
- Sport: Golf
- College: Fresno State University
- Turned professional: 1989
- Current tour: PGA Tour Champions
- Former tour: Nationwide Tour
- Professional wins: 3

Number of wins by tour
- PGA Tour Champions: 1
- Other: 2

Doug Garwood (born March 31, 1963) is an American professional golfer.

Garwood played college golf at Fresno State University where he was a two-time All-American.

Garwood played on the Nationwide Tour from 2002 to 2005. His best finish was a playoff loss to Andy Miller in the 2002 State Farm Open.

Garwood began playing on the PGA Tour Champions in 2013 and won the 2016 SAS Championship. He was the son of actor Kelton Garwood.

== Professional wins (3) ==
=== PGA Tour Champions wins (1) ===
No.	Date	Tournament	Winning score	Margin of victory	Runner-up
1	Oct 16, 2016	SAS Championship	−16 (65-71-64=200)	4 strokes	(Germany) Bernhard Langer

PGA Tour Champions playoff record (0–1)

No.	Year	Tournament	Opponent	Result
1	2014	Principal Charity Classic	(United States) Tom Pernice Jr.	Lost to birdie on second extra hole

=== Other wins (2) ===
- 2001 Long Beach Open
- 2014 Straight Down Fall Classic

== Playoff record ==
Buy.com Tour playoff record (0–1)

No.	Year	Tournament	Opponents	Result
1	2002	State Farm Open	(United States) Andy Miller, (United States) John Restino, (United States) Dave Stockton Jr.	Miller won with birdie on first extra hole
