= Philadelphia Classic =

Golf tournament

Nike Laurel Creek Classic
Tournament information
- Location: Mount Laurel, New Jersey
- Established: 1995
- Course: Laurel Creek Country Club
- Par: 71
- Tour: Nike Tour
- Format: Stroke play
- Prize fund: $200,000
- Final year: 1997

Tournament record score
- Aggregate: 267 Sean Murphy (1995)
- To par: −19 Matt Gogel (1997)

Final champion
- (United States) Matt Gogel
- Location in the United States Location in New Jersey

The Philadelphia Classic was a golf tournament on the Nike Tour. It ran from 1995 to 1997. In 1995 and 1996 it was played at Philmont Country Club in Huntingdon Valley, Pennsylvania. In 1997 it was played at Laurel Creek Country Club in Mount Laurel, New Jersey.

The winner earned $36,000 each year.

== Winners ==
Year	Winner	Score	To par	Margin of victory	Runner(s)-up	Winner's share ($)	Purse ($)	Ref
Nike Philadelphia Classic
1995	(United States) Sean Murphy	267	−13	1 stroke	(United States) Allen Doyle	36,000	200,000	
1996	(United States) Brett Quigley	273	−7	2 strokes	(United States) R. W. Eaks (United States) Rocky Walcher	36,000	200,000	
Nike Laurel Creek Classic
1997	(United States) Matt Gogel	269	−15	1 stroke	(United States) Dennis Paulson	36,000	200,000	
