= P. J. Cowan (golfer) =

American professional golfer (born 1967)

Personal information
- Nationality: United States
- Born: November 21, 1967 (age 58) Hicksville, New York, U.S.
- Height: 5 ft 9 in (1.75 m)
- Weight: 155 lb (70 kg; 11.1 st)

Career
- Sport: Golf
- College: St. John's University
- Turned professional: 1990
- Former tours: Nike Tour; Golden Bear Tour
- Professional wins: 8

Number of wins by tour
- Korn Ferry Tour: 1
- Other: 7

Best results in major championships
- Masters Tournament: DNP
- PGA Championship: DNP
- U.S. Open: CUT: 1997
- The Open Championship: DNP

P. J. Cowan (born November 21, 1967) is an American professional golfer. He won the Nike Tallahassee Open on the 1996 Nike Tour.

== Early life ==
Cowan was born in Hicksville, New York. After earning a full scholarship to St. Johns University, Cowan won the 1988 Big East Championship.

== Career ==
In 1990, Cowan turned professional. In 1996, he won the Nike Tallahassee Open. Cowan was the first alternate at the 1995 U.S. Open. Two years later, he played the 1997 U.S. Open at Congressional Country Club but missed the cut. Cowan is a three-time Met PGA Assistant Player of the Year Award winner. He is also a three-time New York State Open champion.

== Amateur wins ==
- 1987 Long Island Amateur, Havemeyer Invitational
- 1988 Big East Championship
- 1989 Guadalajara Amateur

== Professional wins (8) ==
=== Nike Tour wins (1) ===
No.	Date	Tournament	Winning score	Margin of victory	Runner-up
1	Apr 7, 1996	Nike Tallahassee Open	−9 (69-70-66-74=279)	Playoff	(United States) P. H. Horgan III

Nike Tour playoff record (1–0)

No.	Year	Tournament	Opponent	Result
1	1996	Nike Tallahassee Open	(United States) P. H. Horgan III	Won with birdie on first extra hole

=== Golden Bear Tour wins (1) ===
No.	Date	Tournament	Winning score	Margin of victory	Runners-up
1	Jun 13, 2002	John O' Classic	−9 (68-72-67=207)	2 strokes	(United States) Reid Edstrom, (United States) Kevin Haefner

=== Other wins (6) ===
- 1995 Bahamas National Open
- 1999 Bermuda Open
- 1997 Portugal Azores Open, New York State Open
- 1998 New York State Open
- 2000 New York State Open

== Results in major championships ==
Tournament	1997
U.S. Open	CUT

CUT = missed the halfway cut
Note: Cowan only played in the U.S. Open.
