= Michael Christie (golfer) =

American professional golfer (1969–2004)

Personal information
- Nationality: United States
- Born: June 25, 1969 Greenville, South Carolina, U.S.
- Died: April 22, 2004 (aged 34) Greenville, South Carolina, U.S.

Career
- Sport: Golf
- College: University of South Carolina
- Turned professional: 1993
- Former tours: PGA Tour; Sunshine Tour; Nike Tour; Hooters Tour
- Professional wins: 6

Number of wins by tour
- Korn Ferry Tour: 4
- Other: 2

Best results in major championships
- Masters Tournament: DNP
- PGA Championship: DNP
- U.S. Open: T52: 1993
- The Open Championship: DNP

Michael Christie (June 25, 1969 – April 22, 2004) was an American professional golfer who played on the PGA Tour, Nationwide Tour and NGA Hooters Tour.

== Early life and amateur career ==
Christie was born in Greenville, South Carolina. He was an All-American at the University of South Carolina in 1992.

== Professional career ==
In 1993, Christie got his start in professional golf by qualifying for the 1993 U.S. Open where he finished T-52. He won his first pro tournament on the Nike Tour at the 1995 Carolina Classic in Raleigh, North Carolina by shooting a tournament record of 22-under-par. He played on the Nike Tour from 1994 to 1996 winning four times and earned his PGA Tour card as a result of his three victories in 1996, finishing second Stewart Cink on the money list. Christie played on the PGA Tour from 1997 to 2000; his best finish was a tie for sixth at the Greater Vancouver Open in 1997.

Christie began experiencing debilitating physical ailments beginning in 1998 which curtailed his golfing career. Through several surgeries, he attempted comebacks to the professional ranks through 2003.

In addition to his successes on the PGA and Nationwide Tours, Christie won twice on the Hooters Tour. His teammates at the University of South Carolina included current pros Carl Paulson and Brett Quigley.

== Death ==
In 2004, Christie committed suicide at the age of 34.

== Professional wins (6) ==
=== Nike Tour wins (4) ===
No.	Date	Tournament	Winning score	Margin of victory	Runner-up
1	Jun 25, 1995	Nike Carolina Classic	−22 (68-66-66-66=266)	2 strokes	(United States) Sean Murphy
2	May 26, 1996	Nike Greater Greenville Classic	−23 (68-65-69-63=265)	6 strokes	(United States) Danny Ellis
3	Aug 25, 1996	Nike Permian Basin Open	−18 (68-71-66-65=270)	2 strokes	(United States) Anthony Rodriguez
4	Sep 14, 1996	Nike Utah Classic	−20 (66-63-67=196)	4 strokes	(United States) R. W. Eaks

=== Hooters Tour wins (2) ===
No.	Date	Tournament	Winning score	Margin of victory	Runner-up
1	Jul 24, 1994	Bud Light Golf Classic	−20 (65-68-66-65=264)	4 strokes	(United States) Bo Fennell
2	Jun 11, 1995	Chattanooga-Hamilton County Classic	−18 (66-69-65-70=270)	1 stroke	(United States) Jack O'Keefe

== Results in major championships ==
Tournament	1993	1994	1995	1996
U.S. Open	T52			T79

Did not play

"T" = tied
Note: Christie only played in the U.S. Open.

== See also ==
- 1996 Nike Tour graduates
- List of golfers with most Web.com Tour wins
