= 1993 Nike Tour graduates =

This is a list of players who graduated from the Nike Tour in 1993. The top ten players on the Nike Tour's money list in 1993 earned their PGA Tour card for 1994.

	1993 Nike Tour		1994 PGA Tour				
Player	Money list rank	Earnings ($)	Starts	Cuts made	Best finish	Money list rank	Earnings ($)
(United States) Sean Murphy	1	166,293	31	14	T8	156	97,597
(United States) Doug Martin	2	147,003	33	8	T9	168	81,201
(United States) Stan Utley	3	144,127	29	9	T8	179	63,345
(United States) Bob May*	4	132,656	31	7	T18	209	31,079
(United States) John Morse*	5	122,627	26	12	T6	122	146,137
(United States) Tommy Moore	6	102,004	20	4	T37	246	12,601
(United States) Olin Browne	7	100,754	31	15	6	154	101,580
(United States) Larry Silveira	8	93,098	28	12	T8	155	99,671
(United States) Chris DiMarco*	9	90,687	29	16	T3	85	216,839
(United States) Curt Byrum	10	88,757	28	13	T5	128	137,587

*PGA Tour rookie for 1994.

T = Tied
Green background indicates the player retained his PGA Tour card for 1995 (finished inside the top 125).
Yellow background indicates player did not retain his PGA Tour card for 1995, but retained conditional status (finished between 126–150).
Red background indicates the player did not retain his PGA Tour card for 1995 (finished outside the top 150).

== See also ==
- 1993 PGA Tour Qualifying School graduates
