= 1982 PGA Tour Qualifying School graduates =

This is a list of the 1982 PGA Tour Qualifying School graduates. 50 players earned their 1983 PGA Tour card through Q-School in 1982. The tournament was played over 108 holes at the Tournament Players Club in Ponte Vedra, Florida. The top 30 players split the $50,000 purse, with the winner earning $9,000. This was the first qualifying school during the PGA Tour's the "All-exempt Tour" era. All graduates had full status on the PGA Tour the subsequent year.

== Tournament summary ==
Donnie Hammond won the event by a record breaking margin.

Mac O'Grady played in the PGA Tour Qualifying Tournament for the 17th time. He had been unsuccessful the first 16 times. He opened poorly with rounds of 79–76. However, he "steadied" with a "brilliant" fourth round 66. In the sixth and final round, he shot a 73 to earn his card for the first time.

Charlie Bolling attempted to earn playing privileges for the second straight year. He missed graduating by one shot this time.

== List of graduates ==
Place	Player	Notes
1	(United States) Donnie Hammond	Won by 14 strokes, largest margin of victory in Q-school history
2	(United States) David Peoples	
3	(Zimbabwe) Nick Price	1 European Tour win, 2 Sunshine Tour wins, runner-up at 1982 Open Championship
T4	(United States) Bob Boyd	
T4	(Taiwan) Chen Tze-chung	1 Japan Golf Tour win
T4	(United States) Buddy Gardner	
T4	(United States) Mac O'Grady	Qualified in 17th attempt at Q-School
T4	(Canada) Richard Zokol	
T9	(United States) Dan Forsman	
T9	(United States) John McComish	
T9	(United States) Gary McCord	
T12	(United States) Tom Jones	
T12	(United States) Mike Peck	
T14	(United States) Ken Green	
T14	(United States) Joey Rassett	
T14	(United States) Bill Sander	
T14	(United States) Jeff Sanders	
T18	(United States) Mike Brannan	
T18	(United States) Steve Hart	
T18	(United States) Lindy Miller	Low amateur at 1978 Masters Tournament
T18	(United States) Rod Nuckolls	
T22	(United States) Doug Black	
T22	(United States) Curt Byrum	
T22	(United States) Lyn Lott	Top-10 at 1976 and 1977 U.S. Open
T22	(United States) Larry Rinker	
T22	(United States) Mick Soli	
T28	(United States) Russ Cochran	
T28	(United States) David Ogrin	
T28	(United States) Ivan Smith	
T31	(United States) Wally Armstrong	5th place at 1978 Masters Tournament
T31	(United States) Darrell Kestner	
T31	(United States) Bill Murchison	
T31	(United States) Loren Roberts	
T31	(United States) Jimmy Roy	
T31	(United States) Tony Sills	
T37	(Mexico) Rafael Alarcón	
T37	(United States) Ronnie Black	
T37	(United States) Mark Coward	
T37	(United States) Mike Gove	
T37	(United States) Tom Lehman	
T37	(United States) Blaine McCallister	
T37	(United States) Lonnie Nielsen	
T37	(Canada) Ray Stewart	
44	(United States) Lars Meyerson	
T45	(United States) Jon Chaffee	
T45	(United States) Rick Dalpos	
T45	(United States) Ken Kelley	
T45	(United States) Rick Pearson	
T45	(United States) Sammy Rachels	
T45	(United States) Jeff Sluman	
