= Tim Conley =

American professional golfer (born 1958)

Personal information
- Nationality: United States
- Born: December 8, 1958 (age 67) Cleveland, Ohio, U.S.
- Height: 5 ft 10 in (1.78 m)
- Weight: 175 lb (79 kg; 12.5 st)

Career
- Sport: Golf
- College: University of Akron
- Turned professional: 1981
- Former tours: Champions Tour; PGA Tour; Nationwide Tour; Tour de las Américas; NGA Hooters Tour
- Professional wins: 9

Number of wins by tour
- Korn Ferry Tour: 2
- Other: 7

Best results in major championships
- Masters Tournament: DNP
- PGA Championship: DNP
- U.S. Open: CUT: 1992
- The Open Championship: DNP

Tim Conley (born December 8, 1958) is an American professional golfer who played on the PGA Tour, Nationwide Tour and most recently the Champions Tour.

== Professional career ==
Conley joined the PGA Tour in 1993, earning his card through qualifying school. He did not perform well on Tour in his rookie year but he did win the Nike Knoxville Open on the Nationwide Tour. In 1994 he played on the Nationwide Tour full-time and recorded a runner up finish but only made 7 of 21 cuts. He continued to play on the Nationwide Tour and won the Nike Gateway Classic in 1996 in a playoff.

Conley returned to the PGA Tour in 1998, earning his card through qualifying school. He had another poor year on Tour but did finish 5th at the FedEx St. Jude Classic, his best finish on the PGA Tour of his career. Conley returned to the Nationwide Tour in 1999 where he would play until 2000. He played in a limited number of events until 2007 when he joined the Champions Tour. He finished 83rd on the money list in his rookie year on Tour, missing only one cut in 13 events. He played in fewer events in 2008 and 2009 and has not played on the Tour since.

== Professional wins (9) ==
=== Nike Tour wins (2) ===
No.	Date	Tournament	Winning score	Margin of victory	Runner(s)-up
1	May 16, 1993	Nike Knoxville Open	−23 (65-63-66-67=261)	7 strokes	(United States) Jerry Haas, (United States) Larry Silveira, (United States) Tommy Tolles, (United States) Greg Whisman
2	Aug 4, 1996	Nike Gateway Classic	−10 (68-70-71-69=278)	Playoff	(Mexico) Javier Sanchez

Nike Tour playoff record (1–0)

No.	Year	Tournament	Opponent	Result
1	1996	Nike Gateway Classic	(Mexico) Javier Sanchez	Won with birdie on first extra hole

=== Tour de las Américas wins (1) ===
No.	Date	Tournament	Winning score	Margin of victory	Runner-up
1	Jan 10, 2004	Caribbean Open	−4 (71-69-72-72=284)	4 strokes	(United States) Peter Horrobin

=== NGA Hooters Tour wins (1) ===
No.	Date	Tournament	Winning score	Margin of victory	Runner-up
1	Mar 17, 1996	Shriner's Classic	−6 (69-72-69=210)	1 stroke	(United States) Mark Swygert

=== Other wins (5) ===
this list may be incomplete

- 1989 Bermuda Open
- 1992 Kansas Open
- 2005 Georgia Open
- 2006 Bermuda Open
- 2007 Bermuda Open

== Results in major championships ==
Tournament	1992
U.S. Open	CUT

CUT = missed the halfway cut
Note: Conley only played in the U.S. Open.

== See also ==
- 1992 PGA Tour Qualifying School graduates
- 1997 PGA Tour Qualifying School graduates
