= 2002 PGA Tour Qualifying School graduates =

This is a list of the 38 players who earned their 2003 PGA Tour card through Q School in 2002.

Place	Player	PGA Tour starts	Cuts made	Notes
1	(United States) Jeff Brehaut	57	28	2 Buy.com Tour wins
T2	(Germany) Alex Čejka	16	8	4 European Tour wins
T2	(Australia) James McLean	0	0	
T2	(United States) Chris Anderson	1	0	
T5	(Japan) Akio Sadakata	0	0	
T5	(United States) John Maginnes	138	71	3 Buy.com Tour wins
T5	(United States) Donnie Hammond	441	314	2 PGA Tour wins, 1 Buy.com Tour win
T8	(United States) Aaron Barber	2	0	
T8	(South Africa) Brenden Pappas	25	6	
T8	(United States) Brian Bateman	34	16	1 Buy.com Tour win
T11	(Sweden) Richard S. Johnson	1	0	1 European Tour win
T11	(United States) Dean Wilson	6	3	6 Japan Golf Tour wins
T11	(United States) Joel Kribel	14	3	Former Western Amateur winner and U.S. Amateur runner-up
T11	(United States) David Sutherland	174	91	1 Buy.com Tour win; former Western Amateur champion; brother of Kevin Sutherland
T11	(Australia) Scott Laycock	5	1	1 Japan Golf Tour win, 1 PGA Tour of Australasia win
T11	(England) John E. Morgan	0	0	Second player (after Richie Coughlan) to earn both PGA and European Tour cards in his rookie season
T17	(United States) Paul Goydos	294	181	1 PGA Tour win, 1 Buy.com Tour win
T17	(United States) Vance Veazey	29	6	2 Buy.com Tour wins
T17	(United States) Mark Wilson	8	4	
T17	(Australia) Anthony Painter	4	2	1 Buy.com Tour win
T21	(United States) Dave Stockton Jr.	239	106	2 Buy.com Tour wins; son of Dave Stockton
T21	(United States) Bart Bryant	163	88	Brother of Brad Bryant
T21	(Sweden) Carl Pettersson	3	2	1 European Tour win
T21	(United States) Jeff Klein	6	1	
T21	(United States) Tom Gillis	8	5	
T26	(United States) Ken Green	477	267	5 PGA Tour wins, 1 Japan Golf Tour win
T26	(United States) Brad Lardon	69	25	
T26	(United States) Andy Miller	5	2	1 Buy.com Tour win; son of Johnny Miller
T26	(United States) Jason Caron	30	11	
T26	(United States) Woody Austin	247	127	1 PGA Tour win
T26	(Japan) Kenichi Kuboya	3	2	4 Japan Golf Tour wins
T26	(United States) Brett Quigley	162	89	2 Buy.com Tour wins; nephew of Dana Quigley
T26	(United States) Ben Curtis	2	1	Former Players Amateur winner
T34	(Australia) Mathew Goggin	86	39	2 Buy.com Tour wins, 2 Challenge Tour wins, 1 PGA Tour of Australasia win
T34	(United States) Mike Heinen	142	64	1 PGA Tour win
T34	(United States) Cameron Yancey	1	0	
T34	(United States) Brian Watts	149	86	12 Japan Golf Tour wins
T34	(United States) Mike Grob	7	1	

- Players in yellow were 2003 PGA Tour rookies.

== 2003 Results ==
Player	Starts	Cuts made	Best finish	Money list rank	Earnings ($)
(United States) Jeff Brehaut	32	23	T5	99	650,019
(Germany) Alex Čejka*	30	20	T2	60	1,182,883
(Australia) James McLean*	19	5	T18	201	117,182
(United States) Chris Anderson*	31	16	T4	152	342,028
(Japan) Akio Sadakata*	29	11	T39	206	107,730
(United States) John Maginnes	29	13	T5	155	308,928
(United States) Donnie Hammond	27	19	T23	166	255,414
(United States) Aaron Barber*	32	13	T4	140	425,277
(South Africa) Brenden Pappas	33	19	T2	51	1,307,809
(United States) Brian Bateman	26	10	T11	173	217,150
(Sweden) Richard S. Johnson*	28	16	T3	120	559,021
(United States) Dean Wilson*	27	15	T6	98	654,345
(United States) Joel Kribel*	16	3	T37	233	39,120
(United States) David Sutherland	25	13	9	136	451,442
(Australia) Scott Laycock*	25	10	T10	156	300,342
(England) John E. Morgan*	29	11	T5 (twice)	141	422,917
(United States) Paul Goydos	25	18	T6	88	734,284
(United States) Vance Veazey	26	8	T20	203	111,157
(United States) Mark Wilson*	30	11	4	128	482,502
(Australia) Anthony Painter*	31	12	T14	170	200,714
(United States) Dave Stockton Jr.	31	7	T12	175	214,876
(United States) Bart Bryant	6	6	T24	215	78,966
(Sweden) Carl Pettersson*	26	15	2	74	977,076
(United States) Jeff Klein*	25	4	T31	232	40,680
(United States) Tom Gillis*	25	11	T7	139	432,100
(United States) Ken Green	7	3	T25	221	70,633
(United States) Brad Lardon	8	1	T39	245	16,400
(United States) Andy Miller*	25	13	T31	191	134,930
(United States) Jason Caron	29	9	T15	183	172,292
(United States) Woody Austin	31	23	2	44	1,518,707
(Japan) Kenichi Kuboya*	31	14	T13	164	257,282
(United States) Brett Quigley	27	19	4	82	786,294
(United States) Ben Curtis*	21	13	Win	46	1,434,911
(Australia) Mathew Goggin	28	16	T20	157	299,238
(United States) Mike Heinen	29	16	T11	138	432,417
(United States) Cameron Yancey*	23	5	T56	231	43,810
(United States) Brian Watts	13	5	T22 (twice)	192	134,905
(United States) Mike Grob*	27	14	T5	150	348,976

*PGA Tour rookie in 2003
T = Tied
Green background indicates the player retained his PGA Tour card for 2004 (finished inside the top 125).
Yellow background indicates the player did not retain his PGA Tour card for 2004, but retained conditional status (finished between 126-150).
Red background indicates the player did not retain his PGA Tour card for 2004 (finished outside the top 150).

== Winners on the PGA Tour in 2003 ==
No.	Date	Player	Tournament	Winning score	Margin of victory	Runners-up
1	Jul 20	(United States) Ben Curtis	The Open Championship	−1 (72-72-70-69=283)	1 stroke	(Denmark) Thomas Bjørn, (Fiji) Vijay Singh

== Runners-up on the PGA Tour in 2003 ==
No.	Date	Player	Tournament	Winner	Winning score	Runner-up score
1	Feb 16	(Sweden) Carl Pettersson	Buick Invitational	(United States) Tiger Woods	−16 (70-66-68-68=272)	−12 (69-68-70-69=276)
2	Jul 20	(United States) Woody Austin lost in two-man playoff	MCI Heritage	(United States) Davis Love III	−13 (66-69-69-67=271)	−13 (68-70-65-68=271)
3	Jul 20	(Germany) Alex Čejka	B.C. Open	(United States) Craig Stadler	−21 (67-69-68-63=267)	−20 (66-66-69-67=268)
4	Oct 5	(South Africa) Brenden Pappas	Southern Farm Bureau Classic	(United States) John Huston	−20 (66-66-68-68=268)	−19 (72-69-66-62=269)

== See also ==
- 2002 Buy.com Tour graduates
