= Todd Gleaton =

American professional golfer (born 1968)

Personal information
- Nationality: United States
- Born: September 25, 1968 (age 58) Charleston, South Carolina, U.S.
- Height: 6 ft 2 in (1.88 m)
- Weight: 190 lb (86 kg; 14 st)
- Spouse: Courtney McMillan

Career
- Sport: Golf
- College: North Carolina State
- Turned professional: 1991
- Former tours: Nike Tour; Hooters Tour
- Professional wins: 3

Number of wins by tour
- Korn Ferry Tour: 2
- Other: 1

Todd Gleaton (born September 25, 1968) is an American professional golfer. He played on the Nike Tour and NGA Hooters Tour as well as other mini-tours.

== Early life ==
Gleaton had over 60 junior golf tournament wins. He was a member of the North Carolina State Championship High School team playing with South View High School out of Hope Mills, North Carolina. He was also the 1985 and 1986 North Carolina Junior champion.

== Amateur career ==
Gleaton attended North Carolina State University on a full golf scholarship from 1987 to 1990 and captured numerous titles. He was the 1988 North South low qualifier 136, 1989 Wolfpack Invitational champion, 1989 University of Georgia Tournament champion, and the 1989 MVP of the NC State golf team. His NC State team was ACC champions in 1990.

== Professional career ==
In 1997, Gleaton joined the Nationwide Tour. He won the Nike St. Louis Golf Classic and the Nike Tri-Cities Open. Gleaton has also played on the NGA Hooters Tour and the EGolf Professional Tour.

== Professional wins (3) ==
=== Nike Tour wins (2) ===
No.	Date	Tournament	Winning score	Margin of victory	Runner(s)-up
1	Jul 20, 1997	Nike St. Louis Golf Classic	−23 (66-67-64-64=261)	3 strokes	(Canada) Ardon Knoll
2	Sep 28, 1997	Nike Tri-Cities Open	−5 (70-72-71-70=283)	1 stroke	(United States) Kent Jones, (United States) Patrick Lee, (United States) Tim Loustalot, (United States) Rob Moss, (Australia) Terry Price, (Canada) Ray Stewart

=== Hooters Tour wins (1) ===
No.	Date	Tournament	Winning score	Margin of victory	Runner-up
1	May 14, 1995	Hooters Classic	−21 (65-69-66-67=267)	3 strokes	(United States) Mike Swartz
