= 1996 Nike Tour =

Golf tour season

1996 Nike Tour season
- Duration: February 22, 1996 – October 20, 1996
- Number of official events: 29
- Most wins: (United States) Michael Christie (3) (United States) Stewart Cink (3)
- Money list: (United States) Stewart Cink
- Player of the Year: (United States) Stewart Cink

The 1996 Nike Tour was the seventh season of the Nike Tour, the official development tour to the PGA Tour.

== Schedule ==
The following table lists official events during the 1996 season.

Date	Tournament	Location	Purse (US$)	Winner (Note: The number in parentheses after each winner's name is the number of Nike Tour events they had won up to and including that tournament. This information is only shown for Nike Tour members. It is rare for someone to accumulate many wins on the Nike Tour as success at this level usually leads to promotion to the PGA Tour.)	Notes
Feb 25	Nike San Jose Open	California	200,000	(United States) Larry Silveira (1)	
Mar 3	Nike Inland Empire Open	California	200,000	(United States) Jim Estes (1)	
Mar 17	Nike Monterrey Open	Mexico	225,000	(United States) David Berganio Jr. (1)	
Mar 31	Nike Louisiana Open	Louisiana	250,000	(United States) Paul Stankowski (1)	
Apr 7	Nike Tallahassee Open	Florida	200,000	(United States) P. J. Cowan (1)	
Apr 14	Nike South Carolina Classic	South Carolina	200,000	(United States) Dave Rummells (1)	
Apr 21	Nike Alabama Classic	Alabama	200,000	(United States) P. H. Horgan III (3)	
Apr 28	Nike Shreveport Open	Louisiana	200,000	(United States) Tim Loustalot (2)	
May 12	Nike Mississippi Gulf Coast Classic	Mississippi	200,000	(United States) Joe Durant (1)	
May 19	Nike Carolina Classic	North Carolina	200,000	(Canada) Glen Hnatiuk (3)	
May 26	Nike Greater Greenville Classic	South Carolina	200,000	(United States) Michael Christie (2)	
Jun 2	Nike Dominion Open	Virginia	200,000	(United States) Olin Browne (4)	
Jun 9	Nike Cleveland Open	Ohio	200,000	(United States) Greg Twiggs (1)	
Jun 16	Nike Knoxville Open	Tennessee	200,000	(United States) Eric Johnson (1)	
Jun 23	Nike Ozarks Open	Missouri	200,000	(United States) Stewart Cink (1)	
Jun 30	Nike Dakota Dunes Open	South Dakota	250,000	(United States) Gary Webb (1)	
Jul 14	Nike Buffalo Open	New York	200,000	(United States) Jimmy Green (1)	
Jul 21	Nike Philadelphia Classic	Pennsylvania	200,000	(United States) Brett Quigley (1)	
Jul 28	Nike Miami Valley Open	Ohio	200,000	(United States) J. P. Hayes (1)	
Aug 4	Nike Gateway Classic	Missouri	200,000	(United States) Tim Conley (2)	
Aug 11	Nike Omaha Classic	Nebraska	200,000	(United States) Rocky Walcher (1)	New tournament
Aug 18	Nike Wichita Open	Kansas	200,000	(United States) Rick Cramer (1)	
Aug 25	Nike Permian Basin Open	Texas	200,000	(United States) Michael Christie (3)	
Sep 8	Nike Colorado Classic	Colorado	200,000	(United States) Stewart Cink (2)	New tournament
Sep 14	Nike Utah Classic	Utah	200,000	(United States) Michael Christie (4)	
Sep 22	Nike Boise Open	Idaho	250,000	(United States) Matt Gogel (1)	
Sep 29	Nike Tri-Cities Open	Washington	200,000	(New Zealand) Phil Tataurangi (1)	
Oct 6	Nike Olympia Open	Washington	200,000	(United States) Michael Clark II (1)	New tournament
Oct 20	Nike Tour Championship	Georgia	250,000	(United States) Stewart Cink (3)	Tour Championship

== Money list ==
The money list was based on prize money won during the season, calculated in U.S. dollars. The top 10 players on the money list earned status to play on the 1997 PGA Tour.

Position	Player	Prize money ($)
1	(United States) Stewart Cink	251,699
2	(United States) Michael Christie	193,971
3	(United States) Joe Durant	159,386
4	(United States) David Berganio Jr.	146,047
5	(United States) Brett Quigley	123,763

== Awards ==
Award	Winner	Ref.
Player of the Year (Jack Nicklaus Trophy)	(United States) Stewart Cink	
