= Dave Stockton Jr. =

American professional golfer (born 1968)

Personal information
- Nationality: United States
- Born: July 31, 1968 (age 58) Redlands, California, U.S.
- Height: 6 ft 2 in (1.88 m)
- Weight: 200 lb (91 kg; 14 st)

Career
- Sport: Golf
- College: University of Southern California
- Turned professional: 1990
- Former tours: PGA Tour; Nationwide Tour
- Professional wins: 2

Number of wins by tour
- Korn Ferry Tour: 2

Dave Stockton Jr. (born July 31, 1968) is an American professional golfer who played on the PGA Tour and the Nationwide Tour.

== Early life ==
In 1968, Stockton Jr. was born in Redlands, California. Stockton's father, Dave Stockton, was a notable professional golfer. He won the PGA Championship in 1970 and 1976 and was also the United States Ryder Cup captain in 1991.

== Professional career ==
In 1993, Stockton joined the Nike Tour and won two events in his rookie year, the Nike Connecticut Open and the Nike Hawkeye Open. In the fall, Stockton graduated from 1993 PGA Tour Qualifying School.

In his rookie year on the PGA Tour, in 1994, he finished 96th on the money list while recording three top-10 finishes, including finishing in a tie for third twice. The following year he recorded his best finish on the PGA Tour when he finished in a tie for second at the Canon Greater Hartford Open. He finished 124th on the money list, just good enough to retain his card. In 1996, he finished 120th on the money list while recording two top-10 finishes. The following year, 1997, was his first down year on Tour, he finished 146th on the money list, only good enough to retain part-time status on Tour. In 1998, he finished 132nd on the money list but got his Tour card for the following year by going through qualifying school for the second time. In 1999, he struggled to finish in the top 125 again and earned his Tour card through qualifying school for the third time. He finished 140th on the money list in 2000, so he was only able to play part-time in 2001.

He returned to the developmental tour in 2002 and then earned his PGA Tour card for 2003 through qualifying school for the fourth time. He didn't have a good year on Tour and returned to the Nationwide Tour in 2004, his final year on Tour.

Stockton is currently a golf instructor at Oak Valley Golf Club in Beaumont, California.

== Professional wins (2) ==
=== Nike Tour wins (2) ===
No.	Date	Tournament	Winning score	Margin of victory	Runner-up
1	Jun 20, 1993	Nike Connecticut Open	−6 (66-67-71=204)	1 stroke	(United States) Jeff Coston
2	Jul 11, 1993	Nike Hawkeye Open	−13 (70-64-66=200)	4 strokes	(United States) Mike Heinen

Buy.com Tour playoff record (0–1)

No.	Year	Tournament	Opponents	Result
1	2002	State Farm Open	(United States) Doug Garwood, (United States) Andy Miller, (United States) John Restino	Miller won with birdie on first extra hole

== See also ==
- 1993 PGA Tour Qualifying School graduates
- 1998 PGA Tour Qualifying School graduates
- 1999 PGA Tour Qualifying School graduates
- 2002 PGA Tour Qualifying School graduates
