= Huntsville Open =

Professional golf tournament

Nike Huntsville Open
Tournament information
- Location: Huntsville, Alabama
- Established: 1994
- Course: Hampton Cove Golf Course
- Par: 72
- Tour: Nike Tour
- Format: Stroke play
- Prize fund: US$225,000
- Month played: April
- Final year: 1998

Tournament record score
- Aggregate: 273 Buddy Gardner (1994); 273 Jerry Kelly (1994)
- To par: −15 as above

Final champion
- (United States) Dennis Paulson
- Location in the United States Location in Alabama

The Huntsville Open was a professional golf tournament on the Nike Tour. The tournament was held annually from 1994 to 1998. It was played at Cherokee Ridge Country Club in Union Grove, Alabama, from 1994 to 1997. It was played at Hampton Cove Golf Course (Highlands Course) in Huntsville, Alabama, in 1998.

In 1998 the winner earned $40,500.

== Winners ==
Year	Winner	Score	To par	Margin of victory	Runner-up	Ref.
Nike Huntsville Open
1998	(United States) Dennis Paulson	279	−9	Playoff	(United States) Brent Schwarzrock	
Nike Alabama Classic
1997	(United States) John Elliott	204 (Note: Shortened to 54 holes due to weather.)	−12	2 strokes	(United States) Tom Shaw	
1996	(United States) P. H. Horgan III	202	−14	1 stroke	(United States) Jack O'Keefe	
1995	(United States) Jerry Kelly	273	−15	Playoff	(United States) Buddy Gardner	
1994	(United States) Tommy Tolles	274	−14	1 stroke	(United States) Clark Burroughs	
