= Jim Carter (golfer) =

American professional golfer (born 1961)

Personal information
- Full name: Jim Laver Carter
- Nickname: Prez
- Nationality: United States
- Born: June 24, 1961 (age 65) Spring Lake, North Carolina, U.S.
- Height: 6 ft 1 in (1.85 m)
- Weight: 185 lb (84 kg; 13.2 st)

Career
- Sport: Golf
- College: Arizona State University
- Turned professional: 1985
- Current tour: Champions Tour
- Former tours: PGA Tour; Nationwide Tour
- Professional wins: 13
- Highest ranking: 85 (August 20, 1989)

Number of wins by tour
- PGA Tour: 1
- Korn Ferry Tour: 1
- Other: 11

Best results in major championships
- Masters Tournament: DNP
- PGA Championship: T56: 1989
- U.S. Open: T24: 2002
- The Open Championship: T69: 2002

Jim Laver Carter (born June 24, 1961) is an American professional golfer who plays on the Champions Tour. He has also played on the PGA Tour and the Nationwide Tour.

== Early life and amateur career ==
Carter was born in Spring Lake, North Carolina. As a high school senior, he led Mesa High's boys golf team to an Arizona state championship in 1979.

Carter attended Arizona State University in Tempe and was a distinguished member of the golf team – a two-time first-team All-American and an All-Pac-10 conference selection, as well as the 1983 NCAA Champion (Arizona State University's first individual champion in men's golf). He also represented the U.S. Collegians at the USA vs. Japan Matches at Pebble Beach and was named Ambassador. He won the 1981 and 1984 Arizona State Amateur Championship, and the 1983 and 1984 Southwest Amateur Championship. He was three times named Arizona's amateur golfer of the year. He was honored with the Arizona State University Athlete of the Year award in 1984. He was also awarded the conference PAC-10 Medal, the highest honor a student athlete can receive. In 1984, Carter earned a Business degree from Arizona State.

== Professional career ==
In 1985, Carter turned pro. In contrast to his college career, Carter's level of success as a tour professional has been very modest. He won once on the Nationwide Tour in 1994, and once on the PGA Tour in 2000. Qualifying for the PGA Tour has been a constant struggle; however, he managed to qualify for the elite tour in 15 of the 19 years between 1987 and 2005. His best finish in a major championship was T-24 at the 2002 U.S. Open.

In 2011, Carter played in The Senior Open Championship (missed cut) and U.S. Senior Open (finished tied for 50th), his first two career Champions Tour events. He finished 6th at the 2011 Champions Tour Q School, just missing out on earning a Champions Tour card, but earned automatic entry as Q School medalist Jeff Freeman did not turn 50 until April 2012.

== Personal life ==
Carter is a resident of Scottsdale, Arizona.

== Awards and honors ==
- In 1984, he earned the Arizona State University Athlete of the Year award
- In 1995, he was inducted into the Arizona State University Athletic Hall of Fame
- In 2007 he was inducted into the Mesa City Sports Hall of Fame

== Amateur wins ==
- 1979 Arizona state high school (Mesa High) team championship, Mesa City Amateur
- 1981 Arizona State Amateur
- 1983 Southwestern Amateur, NCAA Championship
- 1984 Arizona State Amateur, Southwestern Amateur

== Professional wins (13) ==
=== PGA Tour wins (1) ===
No.	Date	Tournament	Winning score	Margin of victory	Runners-up
1	Feb 27, 2000	Touchstone Energy Tucson Open	−19 (66-68-69-66=269)	2 strokes	(United States) Chris DiMarco, (United States) Tom Scherrer, (France) Jean van de Velde

=== Nike Tour wins (1) ===
No.	Date	Tournament	Winning score	Margin of victory	Runners-up
1	Sep 4, 1994	Nike New Mexico Charity Classic	−16 (69-66-71-66=272)	1 stroke	(United States) Emlyn Aubrey, (United States) Chad Ginn

Nike Tour playoff record (0–2)

No.	Year	Tournament	Opponent(s)	Result
1	1993	Nike Utah Classic	(United States) Curt Byrum, (United States) Tommy Moore, (United States) Sean Murphy	Murphy won with birdie on third extra hole Byrum and Carter eliminated by birdie on second hole
2	1994	Nike Dominion Open	(United States) Sonny Skinner	Lost to birdie on first extra hole

=== Other wins (11) ===
- 1986 Kingman Open
- 1987 Scottsdale Healthcare Classic
- 1989 Arizona Open
- 1992 Wigwam Classic
- 1996 Arizona Open
- 2004 Tommy Bahama Desert Marlin
- 2013 Arizona Senior Open
- 2014 Arizona Senior Open
- 2020 Arizona Senior Open, Lone Star NGL Texas Senior Open
- 2026 Arizona Senior Open

== Results in major championships ==
Tournament	1987	1988	1989	1990	1991	1992	1993	1994	1995	1996	1997	1998	1999	2000	2001	2002
U.S. Open	T71	T55	CUT										T46	CUT		T24
The Open Championship														CUT		T69
PGA Championship		T66	CUT								CUT	T56	CUT	WD		CUT

Did not play

CUT = missed the half-way cut
WD = withdrew
"T" = tied
Note: Carter never played in the Masters Tournament.

== See also ==
- 1986 PGA Tour Qualifying School graduates
- 1987 PGA Tour Qualifying School graduates
- 1994 Nike Tour graduates
- 2004 PGA Tour Qualifying School graduates
