= 1991 Ben Hogan Tour graduates =

This is a list of players who graduated from the Ben Hogan Tour in 1991. The top five players on the Ben Hogan Tour's money list in 1991 earned their PGA Tour card for 1992.

	1991 Hogan Tour		1992 PGA Tour				
Player	Money list rank	Earnings ($)	Starts	Cuts made	Best finish	Money list rank	Earnings ($)
(United States) Tom Lehman	1	141,934	29	25	T2	24	579,093
(United States) Olin Browne*	2	106,406	30	14	T4	147	84,152
(United States) P. H. Horgan III	3	84,432	29	11	T6	116	123,684
(Canada) Jerry Anderson*	4	77,919	33	8	T39	212	19,312
(United States) Frank Conner	5	77,450	32	13	T6	152	74,785

*PGA Tour rookie for 1992.

T = Tied
Green background indicates the player retained his PGA Tour card for 1993 (finished inside the top 125).
Yellow background indicates player did not retain his PGA Tour card for 1993, but retained conditional status (finished between 126–150).
Red background indicates the player did not retain his PGA Tour card for 1993 (finished outside the top 150).

== Runners-up on the PGA Tour in 1992 ==
No.	Date	Player	Tournament	Winner	Winning score	Runner-up score
1	Sep 20	(United States) Tom Lehman	Hardee's Golf Classic	(South Africa) David Frost	−14 (62-68-64-72=266)	−11 (64-69-66-70=269)

== See also ==
- 1991 PGA Tour Qualifying School graduates
