= Andy Miller (golfer) =

American professional golfer (born 1978)

Personal information
- Nationality: United States
- Born: February 3, 1978 (age 48) Napa, California, U.S.
- Height: 6 ft 1 in (1.85 m)
- Weight: 180 lb (82 kg; 13 st)

Career
- Sport: Golf
- College: Brigham Young University
- Turned professional: 2000
- Former tours: Nationwide Tour; PGA Tour
- Professional wins: 1

Number of wins by tour
- Korn Ferry Tour: 1

Best results in major championships
- Masters Tournament: DNP
- PGA Championship: DNP
- U.S. Open: T62: 2002
- The Open Championship: DNP

Andy Miller (born February 3, 1978) is an American professional golfer.

== Early life and amateur career ==
Miller was born in Napa, California. He is the son of former PGA Tour golfer Johnny Miller. He played college golf at Brigham Young University where he was a four-time All-American. He played on the 2000 U.S. Palmer Cup team.

== Professional career ==
In 2000, Miller turned professional. He played on the Buy.com Tour in late 2002 on sponsor's exemptions and by Monday-qualifying. He won the State Farm Open after Monday-qualifying, earning a tour card for the remainder of the year.

Miller earned his 2003 PGA Tour card at 2002 PGA Tour Qualifying School. His best finish on the PGA Tour was a T-31 at the 2003 B.C. Open.

== Professional wins (1) ==
=== Buy.com Tour wins (1) ===
No.	Date	Tournament	Winning score	Margin of victory	Runners-up
1	Sep 29, 2002	State Farm Open	−12 (69-67-70-66=272)	Playoff	(United States) Doug Garwood, (United States) John Restino, (United States) Dave Stockton Jr.

Buy.com Tour playoff record (1–0)

No.	Year	Tournament	Opponents	Result
1	2002	State Farm Open	(United States) Doug Garwood, (United States) John Restino, (United States) Dave Stockton Jr.	Won with birdie on first extra hole

== U.S. national team appearances ==
- Palmer Cup: 2000

== See also ==
- 2002 PGA Tour Qualifying School graduates
