= Charlie Rymer =

American professional golfer (born 1967)

Personal information
- Nationality: United States
- Born: December 18, 1967 (age 58) Cleveland, Tennessee, U.S.
- Height: 6 ft 4 in (1.93 m)
- Weight: 240 lb (110 kg; 17 st)

Career
- Sport: Golf
- College: Georgia Institute of Technology
- Turned professional: 1990
- Former tours: PGA Tour; Nike Tour; T. C. Jordan Tour
- Professional wins: 4

Number of wins by tour
- Korn Ferry Tour: 1
- Other: 3

Best results in major championships
- Masters Tournament: DNP
- PGA Championship: DNP
- U.S. Open: CUT: 1992
- The Open Championship: CUT: 1988

Charlie Rymer (born December 18, 1967) is an American professional golfer who played on the PGA Tour and the Nike Tour. He is currently an analyst for the Golf Channel.

== Amateur career ==
Rymer was born in Cleveland, Tennessee and grew up in Fort Mill, South Carolina. Rymer played college golf at Georgia Tech, where he was a third-team All-American in 1988 and an honorable mention All-American in 1989. He won five tournaments during his time at Georgia Tech. He was inducted into the Georgia Tech Athletics Hall of Fame in 2000. He also won the U.S. Junior Amateur in 1985.

== Professional career ==
Rymer joined the Nike Tour in 1994. He won the 1994 Nike South Carolina Classic and then recorded a runner-up finish the following week at the Nike Central Georgia Open. He earned his PGA Tour card for 1995 through qualifying school. He recorded his career best finish on the PGA Tour in 1995 at the Shell Houston Open, third place, and his career best money list finish at 103rd. In 1996, he finished 145th on the money list, good enough for partial status on Tour the following year. He split time between the PGA Tour and the Nike Tour in 1997. He played on the Nike Tour in 1998, his last year on Tour.

=== Broadcasting career ===
Rymer started working as a commentator for ESPN in 1998. He began working for the Golf Channel in 2009.

In December 2018, Rymer entered into a multimedia partnership with Golf Tourism Solutions, a destination marketing agency managing PlayGolfMyrtleBeach.com, to become the voice of the Myrtle Beach golf scene.

== Amateur wins ==
- 1985 U.S. Junior Amateur

== Professional wins (4) ==
=== Nike Tour wins (1) ===
No.	Date	Tournament	Winning score	Margin of victory	Runner-up
1	May 8, 1994	Nike South Carolina Classic	−14 (67-67-72-68=274)	1 stroke	(United States) Pat Bates

Nike Tour playoff record (0–1)

No.	Year	Tournament	Opponents	Result
1	1994	Nike Central Georgia Open	(United States) Danny Briggs, (United States) Bill Murchison, (United States) Rick Pearson	Pearson won with birdie on second extra hole

=== T. C. Jordan Tour wins (3) ===
No.	Date	Tournament	Winning score	Margin of victory	Runner(s)-up
1	May 24, 1992	Western Sizzlin Classic	−22 (66-65-66-61=258)	3 strokes	(United States) Joe Durant, (United States) Franklin Langham
2	May 2, 1993	Western Sizzlin Classic (2)	−11 (67-72-68-70=277)	Playoff	(United States) Eric Johnson
3	May 30, 1993	Coca-Cola Classic	−19 (66-67-66-62=261)	6 strokes	(United States) Winston Walker

== Results in major championships ==
Tournament	1988	1989	1990	1991	1992
U.S. Open					CUT
The Open Championship	CUT				

Did not play

CUT = missed the half-way cut
Note: Rymer never played in the Masters Tournament or the PGA Championship.

== See also ==
- 1994 PGA Tour Qualifying School graduates
