= 1993 PGA Tour Qualifying School graduates =

This is a list of the 45 players who earned 1994 PGA Tour cards through the PGA Tour Qualifying Tournament in 1993.

Place	Player	PGA Tour starts	Cuts made	Notes
T1	(United States) Ty Armstrong	0	0	
T1	(United States) Dave Stockton Jr.	0	0	2 Nike Tour wins
T1	(United States) Robin Freeman	95	34	
T4	(Australia) Jeff Woodland	31	16	3 Nike Tour wins
T4	(United States) Pete Jordan	4	2	
T4	(Sweden) Jesper Parnevik	0	0	1 European Tour win
7	(United States) Joey Rassett	88	38	
T8	(United States) Morris Hatalsky	418	266	4 PGA Tour wins
T8	(United States) Clark Dennis	78	28	1 Nike Tour win
10	(United States) Dennis Paulson	2	0	
T11	(United States) Glen Day	0	0	
T11	(United States) Steve Gotsche	6	2	
T11	(Japan) Yoshi Mizumaki	5	1	2 Japan Golf Tour wins
T11	(Northern Ireland) David Feherty	10	5	5 European Tour wins
T11	(United States) Todd Barranger	0	0	
T11	(Australia) Steve Rintoul	1	0	
T11	(United States) Bob Burns	1	0	
T18	(United States) Steve Stricker	10	4	
T18	(United States) John Wilson	30	13	
T18	(United States) Tim Simpson	472	328	4 PGA Tour wins
T18	(France) Thomas Levet	0	0	
T18	(United States) Guy Boros	2	1	
T18	(United States) Paul Goydos	30	18	1 Nike Tour win
T24	(United States) Mark Wurtz	0	0	
T24	(United States) Dicky Pride	1	0	
T26	(United States) Steve Brodie	1	0	
T26	(United States) D. A. Russell	1	0	
T26	(United States) Rocky Walcher	1	0	
T26	(United States) Paul Stankowski	0	0	
T26	(Mexico) Esteban Toledo	4	0	
T26	(United States) Mike Heinen	1	0	
T32	(United States) Steve Lamontagne	94	50	
T32	(United States) Don Reese	71	20	1 Nike Tour win
T32	(United States) Billy Kratzert	438	272	4 PGA Tour wins
T32	(United States) Bill Britton	357	199	1 PGA Tour win
T32	(United States) Eddie Kirby	11	3	
T36	(United States) Shaun Micheel	3	0	
T36	(United States) Rob Boldt	2	0	
T36	(United States) Jim Furyk	4	0	1 Nike Tour win
T36	(United States) Brad Lardon	24	8	
T36	(New Zealand) Phil Tataurangi	0	0	
T36	(United States) Chris Kite	16	4	
T36	(United States) Charles Raulerson	0	0	
T36	(United States) Mike Brisky	1	0	
T36	(United States) Tom Garner	45	15	2 Nike Tour wins
T36	(Australia) Brad King	0	0	

PGA Tour rookie in 1994

== 1994 Results ==
Player	Starts	Cuts made	Best finish	Money list rank	Earnings ($)
(United States) Ty Armstrong*	23	8	T19	211	30,181
(United States) Dave Stockton Jr.*	31	15	T3	96	185,209
(United States) Robin Freeman	29	20	T6	103	177,044
(Australia) Jeff Woodland	30	14	T8	143	117,627
(United States) Pete Jordan*	29	13	4	132	128,960
(Sweden) Jesper Parnevik*	17	12	5	120	148,816
(United States) Joey Rassett	24	13	T17	180	62,826
(United States) Morris Hatalsky	25	15	T22	166	81,902
(United States) Clark Dennis	30	22	T6	65	289,065
(United States) Dennis Paulson*	27	12	T4	125	142,515
(United States) Glen Day*	30	18	2	45	357,236
(United States) Steve Gotsche*	21	8	5	182	59,227
(Japan) Yoshi Mizumaki*	18	13	T2	107	168,450
(Northern Ireland) David Feherty*	22	13	2	100	178,501
(United States) Todd Barranger*	26	10	T13	199	40,356
(Australia) Steve Rintoul*	27	15	2	115	157,618
(United States) Bob Burns*	24	12	T5	101	178,168
(United States) Steve Stricker*	26	22	T2	50	334,409
(United States) John Wilson	29	14	T4	117	155,058
(United States) Tim Simpson	31	16	T10	134	126,861
(France) Thomas Levet*	10	1	T69	310	2,200
(United States) Guy Boros*	30	19	T3	76	240,775
(United States) Paul Goydos	31	22	T7	75	241,107
(United States) Mark Wurtz*	29	14	T8	153	103,252
(United States) Dicky Pride*	27	12	Win	57	305,769
(United States) Steve Brodie*	28	15	T7	149	112,081
(United States) D. A. Russell*	10	3	T40	252	9,536
(United States) Rocky Walcher*	23	9	T22	197	41,759
(United States) Paul Stankowski*	29	10	T5	106	170,393
(Mexico) Esteban Toledo*	28	12	T16	176	66,049
(United States) Mike Heinen*	27	12	Win	40	390,963
(United States) Steve Lamontagne	26	15	T11	161	91,643
(United States) Don Reese	17	5	T19	226	19,760
(United States) Billy Kratzert	25	8	T15	196	42,127
(United States) Bill Britton	22	12	T13	173	68,033
(United States) Eddie Kirby*	18	8	T22	215	26,744
(United States) Shaun Micheel*	19	4	T26	247	12,252
(United States) Rob Boldt*	20	11	T17	187	52,992
(United States) Jim Furyk*	31	17	T5	78	236,603
(United States) Brad Lardon	21	8	T37	223	21,429
(New Zealand) Phil Tataurangi*	24	9	T16	190	47,587
(United States) Chris Kite*	19	5	T35	239	13,983
(United States) Charles Raulerson*	24	9	T29	204	33,919
(United States) Mike Brisky*	14	6	T11	200	38,713
(United States) Tom Garner	23	6	T28	227	18,904
(Australia) Brad King*	16	5	T31	238	14,254

*PGA Tour rookie in 1994
T = Tied
The player retained his PGA Tour card for 1995 (finished inside the top 125, excluding non-members)
The player did not retain his PGA Tour card for 1995, but retained conditional status (finished between 126 and 150, excluding non-members)
The player did not retain his PGA Tour card for 1995 (finished outside the top 150)

== Winners on the PGA Tour in 1994 ==
No.	Date	Player	Tournament	Winning score	Margin of victory	Runners-up
1	May 1	(United States) Mike Heinen	Shell Houston Open	−16 (67-68-69-68=272)	3 strokes	(United States) Tom Kite (United States) Jeff Maggert (United States) Hal Sutton
2	Jul 31	(United States) Dicky Pride	Federal Express St. Jude Classic	−17 (66-67-67-67=267)	Playoff	(United States) Gene Sauers (United States) Hal Sutton

== Runners-up on the PGA Tour in 1994 ==
No.	Date	Player	Tournament	Winner	Winning score	Runner-up score
1	Jan 23	(United States) Steve Stricker	Northern Telecom Open	(United States) Andrew Magee	−18 (69-67-67-67=270)	−16 (68-69-68-67=272)
2	May 15	(Japan) Yoshi Mizumaki; Lost in six-man playoff	GTE Byron Nelson Golf Classic	(United States) Neal Lancaster	−9 (67-65=132)	−9 (66-66=132)
3	Jul 10	(United States) Glen Day	Anheuser-Busch Golf Classic	(United States) Mark McCumber	−17 (67-69-65-66=267)	−14 (64-68-72-66=270)
4	Jul 24	(Northern Ireland) David Feherty	New England Classic	(United States) Kenny Perry	−16 (67-66-70-65=268)	−15 (65-69-68-67=269)
5	Oct 2	(Australia) Steve Rintoul	Buick Southern Open	(Australia) Steve Elkington	−16 (66-66-68=200)	−11 (70-65-70=205)

== See also ==
- 1993 Nike Tour graduates
