= South Florida Classic =

Golf tournament

Nike South Florida Classic
Tournament information
- Location: Pompano Beach, Florida
- Established: 1998
- Course: Palm-Aire Country Club
- Par: 71
- Tour: Nike Tour
- Format: Stroke play
- Prize fund: US$225,000
- Month played: January
- Final year: 1999

Tournament record score
- Aggregate: 267 Eric Johnson (1998)
- To par: −13 as above

Final champion
- (United States) Curt Byrum
- Location in the United States Location in Florida

The South Florida Classic was a golf tournament on the Nike Tour. It ran from 1998 to 1999. It was played at Palm-Aire Country Club (Palm Course) in Pompano Beach, Florida.

In 1999 the winner earned $40,500.

== Winners ==
Year	Winner	Score	To par	Margin of victory	Runner-up	Ref
Nike South Florida Open
1998	(United States) Eric Johnson	267	−13	2 strokes	(United States) Chris Riley	
Nike South Florida Classic
1999	(United States) Curt Byrum	275	−9	Playoff	(United States) Stan Utley	
