= 1993 Nike Tour =

Golf tour season

1993 Nike Tour season
- Duration: February 18, 1993 – October 17, 1993
- Number of official events: 30
- Most wins: (United States) Sean Murphy (4)
- Money list: (United States) Sean Murphy
- Player of the Year: (United States) Sean Murphy

The 1993 Nike Tour was the fourth season of the Nike Tour, the official development tour to the PGA Tour.

== Nike title sponsorship ==
In August 1992, it was announced that the tour had signed a title sponsorship agreement with Nike, Inc., and was renamed as the Nike Tour.

== Schedule ==
The following table lists official events during the 1993 season.

Date	Tournament	Location	Purse (US$)	Winner (Note: The number in parentheses after each winner's name is the number of Nike Tour events they had won up to and including that tournament. This information is only shown for Nike Tour members. It is rare for someone to accumulate many wins on the Nike Tour as success at this level usually leads to promotion to the PGA Tour.)	Notes
Feb 21	Nike Yuma Open	Arizona	150,000	(United States) Ron Streck (1)	
Mar 7	Nike Monterrey Open	Mexico	200,000	(United States) Olin Browne (3)	New tournament
Mar 21	Nike Louisiana Open	Louisiana	150,000	(United States) R. W. Eaks (2)	
Mar 28	Nike Panama City Beach Classic	Florida	150,000	(United States) Mike Schuchart (1)	
Apr 4	Nike South Texas Open	Texas	150,000	(United States) Doug Martin (1)	
Apr 18	Nike Shreveport Open	Louisiana	150,000	(United States) Sonny Skinner (1)	
Apr 25	Nike Central Georgia Open	Georgia	150,000	(United States) Sean Murphy (2)	
May 2	Nike South Carolina Classic	South Carolina	150,000	(United States) Hugh Royer III (1)	
May 9	Nike Greater Greenville Classic	South Carolina	150,000	(United States) Sean Murphy (3)	
May 16	Nike Knoxville Open	Tennessee	175,000	(United States) Tim Conley (1)	
May 23	Nike Miami Valley Open	Ohio	175,000	(United States) Emlyn Aubrey (1)	New tournament
Jun 6	Nike Dominion Open	Virginia	175,000	(Paraguay) Ángel Franco (1)	New tournament
Jun 13	Nike Cleveland Open	Ohio	275,000	(United States) Stan Utley (1)	
Jun 20	Nike Connecticut Open	Connecticut	150,000	(United States) Dave Stockton Jr. (1)	
Jun 27	Nike New England Classic	Maine	150,000	(United States) John Morse (1)	
Jul 4	Nike White Rose Classic	Pennsylvania	200,000	(United States) Curt Byrum (1)	New tournament
Jul 11	Nike Hawkeye Open	Iowa	150,000	(United States) Dave Stockton Jr. (2)	
Jul 18	Nike Dakota Dunes Open	South Dakota	175,000	(United States) Alan Pate (1)	
Jul 25	Nike Ozarks Open	Missouri	175,000	(United States) Tommy Tolles (1)	
Aug 1	Nike Mississippi Gulf Coast Classic	Mississippi	150,000	(United States) Jim Furyk (1)	
Aug 8	Nike Permian Basin Open	Texas	150,000	(United States) Franklin Langham (1)	
Aug 15	Nike New Mexico Charity Classic	New Mexico	175,000	(United States) Chris Patton (1)	New tournament
Aug 22	Nike Wichita Open	Kansas	150,000	(United States) David Duval (1)	
Aug 29	Nike Texarkana Open	Arkansas	150,000	(United States) Hugh Royer III (2)	
Sep 12	Nike Tri-Cities Open	Washington	150,000	(United States) Steve Jurgensen (1)	
Sep 19	Nike Utah Classic	Utah	150,000	(United States) Sean Murphy (4)	
Sep 26	Nike Boise Open	Idaho	200,000	(United States) Tommy Moore (1)	
Oct 3	Nike Sonoma County Open	California	150,000	(United States) Sean Murphy (5)	
Oct 10	Nike Bakersfield Open	California	150,000	(United States) Clark Dennis (1)	
Oct 17	Nike Tour Championship	Oregon	200,000	(United States) David Duval (2)	New tournament Tour Championship

== Money list ==
The money list was based on prize money won during the season, calculated in U.S. dollars. The top 10 players on the money list earned status to play on the 1994 PGA Tour.

Position	Player	Prize money ($)
1	(United States) Sean Murphy	166,293
2	(United States) Doug Martin	147,003
3	(United States) Stan Utley	144,127
4	(United States) Bob May	132,656
5	(United States) John Morse	122,627

== Awards ==
Award	Winner	Ref.
Player of the Year (Jack Nicklaus Trophy)	(United States) Sean Murphy	
