= Curt Byrum =

American professional golfer (born 1958)

Personal information
- Full name: Curt Allen Byrum
- Nationality: United States
- Born: December 28, 1958 (age 67) Onida, South Dakota, U.S.
- Height: 6 ft 2 in (1.88 m)
- Weight: 195 lb (88 kg; 13.9 st)

Career
- Sport: Golf
- College: University of New Mexico
- Turned professional: 1982
- Former tour: PGA Tour
- Professional wins: 5
- Highest ranking: 64 (May 8, 1988)

Number of wins by tour
- PGA Tour: 1
- Korn Ferry Tour: 2
- Other: 2

Best results in major championships
- Masters Tournament: CUT: 1990
- PGA Championship: T14: 1987
- U.S. Open: T36: 1995
- The Open Championship: DNP

Curt Allen Byrum (born December 28, 1958) is an American professional golfer who has played on the PGA Tour and the Nationwide Tour. He is the older brother of PGA Tour golfer Tom Byrum.

== Early life ==
Byrum was born and raised in Onida, South Dakota. He learned to play golf on a nine-hole course that he and brother Tom used to mow. He was an exceptionally talented athlete in high school in both football and basketball. Byrum attended the University of New Mexico and was a member of the golf team.

== Professional career ==
In 1982, Byrum turned pro. The following year he joined the PGA Tour.

Byrum has spent time playing on the PGA Tour and the Nationwide Tour. He has 19 top-10 finishes in PGA Tour events and 18 top-10 finishes in Nationwide Tour events. Like his brother, he won once on the PGA Tour; and also like his brother, that win came in 1989. He won twice on the Nationwide Tour. His best finish in a major is T-14 at the 1987 PGA Championship. Late in his career, Byrum began experiencing orthopedic ailments which limited his playing time; he had surgery on his right elbow in 1992 and 1996.

Since 2001, Byrum has worked with The Golf Channel as an analyst. In 2009, Byrum made his Champions Tour debut but has played in only six events.

== Personal life ==
Byrum lives in Scottsdale, Arizona.

== Amateur wins ==
- 1976 South Dakota Men's Stroke Play Championship
- 1979 South Dakota Men's Match Play Championship, South Dakota Men's Stroke Play Championship, Pacific Coast Amateur
- 1980 South Dakota Men's Stroke Play Championship
- 1982 Lake Macquarie Amateur

== Professional wins (5) ==
=== PGA Tour wins (1) ===
No.	Date	Tournament	Winning score	Margin of victory	Runners-up
1	Jul 23, 1989	Hardee's Golf Classic	−12 (66-67-69-66=268)	1 stroke	(United States) Bill Britton, (United States) Brian Tennyson

=== Nike Tour wins (2) ===
No.	Date	Tournament	Winning score	Margin of victory	Runner(s)-up
1	Jul 4, 1993	Nike White Rose Classic	−18 (69-70-64-67=270)	1 stroke	(United States) Morris Hatalsky, (United States) Gary Rusnak, (Mexico) Esteban Toledo
2	Jan 10, 1999	Nike South Florida Classic	−9 (73-66-69-67=275)	Playoff	(United States) Stan Utley

Nike Tour playoff record (1–1)

No.	Year	Tournament	Opponent(s)	Result
1	1993	Nike Utah Classic	(United States) Jim Carter, (United States) Tommy Moore, (United States) Sean Murphy	Murphy won with birdie on third extra hole Byrum and Carter eliminated by birdie on second hole
2	1999	Nike South Florida Classic	(United States) Stan Utley	Won with par on first extra hole

=== Other wins (2) ===
- 1986 Showdown Classic (with Bobby Nichols, unofficial Senior PGA Tour event)
- 2009 Arizona Open

== Results in major championships ==
Tournament	1985	1986	1987	1988	1989	1990	1991	1992	1993	1994	1995	1996
Masters Tournament						CUT						
U.S. Open	T64										T36	T67
PGA Championship			T14	CUT	70						T71	

Note: Byrum never played in The Open Championship.

Did not play

CUT = missed the half-way cut
"T" = tied

== See also ==
- 1982 PGA Tour Qualifying School graduates
- 1983 PGA Tour Qualifying School graduates
- 1993 Nike Tour graduates
