= Chris Patton (golfer) =

American professional golfer (born 1967)

Personal information
- Nickname: Big Daddy
- Nationality: United States
- Born: November 20, 1967 (age 58) Fountain Inn, South Carolina, U.S.
- Height: 6 ft 1 in (1.85 m)
- Weight: 208 lb (94 kg; 14.9 st)
- Spouse: Megan Patton
- Children: 2

Career
- Sport: Golf
- College: Clemson University
- Turned professional: 1990
- Former tours: PGA Tour of Australasia; Nationwide Tour; Canadian Tour; Tour de las Américas
- Professional wins: 4

Number of wins by tour
- PGA Tour of Australasia: 1
- Korn Ferry Tour: 1
- Other: 2

Best results in major championships
- Masters Tournament: T39: 1990
- PGA Championship: DNP
- U.S. Open: CUT: 1990
- The Open Championship: CUT: 1990

Chris Patton (born November 20, 1967) is an American professional golfer, best known for his large size and for winning the 1989 U.S. Amateur.

== Early life ==
Patton was born in Fountain Inn, South Carolina. He played college golf at Clemson University where he won five events and was a three-time All-American. While at Clemson, he won the 1989 U.S. Amateur at Merion Golf Club. The win earned him invitations to the first three majors in 1990. He finished as the low amateur (T-39) at the Masters Tournament. He turned professional after the 1990 U.S. Amateur.

== Professional career ==
Patton played on the Nationwide Tour from 1993 to 1995, winning once at the 1993 Nike New Mexico Charity Classic. He also played on the Canadian Tour, the PGA Tour of Australasia, and the NGA Hooters Tour, winning once on each tour.

In 2012, Patton was part of the reality show Chasing The Dream on the Golf Channel and was featured as Robbie Biershenk's friend and caddie during the 9-episode miniseries.

Patton returned to competitive golf for the first time in 14 years at the 2018 U.S. Senior Open, as he earned his exemption via the one-time exemption offered to former U.S. Amateur winners that have turned professional when they turn 50.

== Amateur wins ==
- 1989 U.S. Amateur

== Professional wins (4) ==
=== PGA Tour of Australasia wins (1) ===
No.	Date	Tournament	Winning score	Margin of victory	Runner-up
1	Feb 10, 1991	Mercedes-Benz Australian Match Play Championship	5 and 3		(Australia) Ken Dukes

=== Nike Tour wins (1) ===
No.	Date	Tournament	Winning score	Margin of victory	Runners-up
1	Aug 15, 1993	Nike New Mexico Charity Classic	−22 (64-66-65-67=262)	5 strokes	(United States) Doug Martin, (United States) John Morse

=== Canadian Tour wins (1) ===
No.	Date	Tournament	Winning score	Margin of victory	Runners-up
1	Jul 12, 1992	Xerox Manitoba Open	−23 (68-64-67-66=265)	10 strokes	(New Zealand) Paul Devenport, (Canada) Arden Knoll, (United States) Mark Wurtz

=== NGA Hooters Tour wins (1) ===
- 2003 Air Medal-Match-Shoot Out

== Results in major championships ==
Tournament	1990	1991	1992	1993	1994
Masters Tournament	T39_{LA}				
U.S. Open	CUT				WD
The Open Championship	CUT				

Did not play

LA = Low amateur
CUT = missed the half-way cut
WD = Withdrew
"T" = tied
Note: Patton never played in the PGA Championship.
