= Brett Quigley =

American professional golfer (born 1969)

Personal information
- Nationality: United States
- Born: August 18, 1969 (age 57) Fort Devens, Massachusetts, U.S.
- Height: 5 ft 11 in (1.80 m)
- Weight: 160 lb (73 kg; 11 st)

Career
- Sport: Golf
- College: University of South Carolina
- Turned professional: 1991
- Current tour: PGA Tour Champions
- Former tours: PGA Tour; Buy.com Tour; Hooters Tour
- Professional wins: 6
- Highest ranking: 56 (October 1, 2006)

Number of wins by tour
- Korn Ferry Tour: 2
- PGA Tour Champions: 2
- Other: 2

Best results in major championships
- Masters Tournament: 51st: 2007
- PGA Championship: T37: 2004
- U.S. Open: T28: 2003
- The Open Championship: CUT: 2006, 2007

Brett Quigley (born August 18, 1969) is an American professional golfer. He currently plays on the PGA Tour Champions, where he won the 2020 Morocco Champions. He was previously a member of the PGA Tour and the Korn Ferry Tour.

== Early life and amateur career ==
Quigley was born on August 18, 1969, in Fort Devens, Massachusetts. He is the nephew of PGA Tour and Champions Tour golfer Dana Quigley.

Quigley won the 1987 U.S. Junior Amateur. He attended the University of South Carolina where he was twice an Academic All-American.

== Professional career ==
In 1991, Quigley turned professional. Quigley has spent his career bouncing between the PGA Tour and it's developmental tour. His best finish on the PGA Tour is second place, but he has two wins on the lower tour, the 1996 Nike Philadelphia Classic and the 2001 Buy.com Arkansas Classic.

Quigley finished in the top 20 of the PGA Tour money list in 2006 and his career earnings exceed $11,000,000.

On February 1, 2020, Quigley won the Morocco Champions on the PGA Tour Champions.

== Personal life ==
Quigley resides in Jupiter, Florida.

== Amateur wins ==
this list may be incomplete

- 1987 U.S. Junior Amateur
- 1988 Northeast Amateur

== Professional wins (6) ==
=== Buy.com Tour wins (2) ===
No.	Date	Tournament	Winning score	Margin of victory	Runner(s)-up
1	Jul 21, 1996	Nike Philadelphia Classic	−7 (64-67-74-68=273)	2 strokes	(United States) R. W. Eaks, (United States) Rocky Walcher
2	Apr 22, 2001	Buy.com Arkansas Classic	−12 (65-69-71-71=276)	3 strokes	(United States) John Elliott

=== Hooters Tour wins (1) ===
No.	Date	Tournament	Winning score	Margin of victory	Runner-up
1	Sep 10, 1995	BB&T Granddaddy Classic	−16 (63-65-67-69=264)	1 stroke	(United States) Rob McKelvey

=== Other wins (1) ===
- 1994 New England Open

=== PGA Tour Champions wins (2) ===
No.	Date	Tournament	Winning score	Margin of victory	Runner-up
1	Feb 1, 2020	Morocco Champions	−15 (69-66-66=201)	1 stroke	(Canada) Stephen Ames
2	Oct 8, 2023	Constellation Furyk and Friends	−11 (67-67-71=205)	1 stroke	(New Zealand) Steven Alker

== Results in major championships ==
Tournament	2000	2001	2002	2003	2004	2005	2006	2007	2008	2009
Masters Tournament								51		
U.S. Open	CUT	CUT		T28			CUT	CUT	T60	
The Open Championship							CUT	CUT		
PGA Championship		CUT			T37	CUT	CUT	T62		CUT

Did not play

CUT = missed the half-way cut
"T" = tied

== Results in The Players Championship ==
Tournament	2002	2003	2004	2005	2006	2007	2008	2009	2010
The Players Championship	CUT		T42	T24	CUT	CUT	T6	CUT	T58

Top 10
Did not play

CUT = missed the halfway cut
"T" indicates a tie for a place

== Results in World Golf Championships ==
Tournament	2006	2007
Match Play		R64
Championship	T9	T50
Invitational		

Top 10
Did not play

QF, R16, R32, R64 = Round in which player lost in match play
"T" = Tied

== Results in senior major championships ==
Results not in chronological order

Tournament	2020	2021	2022	2023	2024	2025	2026
Senior PGA Championship	NT	T16	T61	CUT	CUT	CUT	CUT
The Tradition	NT	T25	T40	39	T57	T27	WD
U.S. Senior Open	NT	CUT	CUT	T4	T42	49	CUT
Senior Players Championship	T28	T42	T38	T9	T21	T55	T53
Senior British Open Championship	NT				CUT		

Top 10
Did not play

CUT = missed the halfway cut
WD = withdrew
"T" indicates a tie for a place
NT = no tournament due to COVID-19 pandemic

== See also ==
- 1996 Nike Tour graduates
- 2002 PGA Tour Qualifying School graduates
