= Mike Heinen =

American professional golfer

Personal information
- Full name: William Michael Heinen Jr.
- Nationality: United States
- Born: January 17, 1967 (age 59) Rayne, Louisiana, U.S.
- Height: 6 ft 1 in (1.85 m)
- Weight: 215 lb (98 kg; 15.4 st)

Career
- Sport: Golf
- College: University of Louisiana at Lafayette
- Turned professional: 1989
- Current tour: Nationwide Tour
- Former tours: PGA Tour; Canadian Tour
- Professional wins: 1
- Highest ranking: 90 (May 14, 1995)

Number of wins by tour
- PGA Tour: 1

Best results in major championships
- Masters Tournament: CUT: 1995
- PGA Championship: CUT: 1994, 1995
- U.S. Open: CUT: 1995, 1996
- The Open Championship: DNP

William Michael Heinen Jr. (born January 17, 1967) is an American professional golfer who has played on the PGA Tour and the Nationwide Tour.

== Early life and amateur career ==
In 1967, Heinen was born in Rayne, Louisiana. He was raised in Fenton, Louisiana. He attended the University of Louisiana at Lafayette from 1985–1989 and was a two-time All-American member of the golf team.

== Professional career ==
In 1989, Heinen turned professional. Throughout his career, Heinen has split his playing time in relatively equal amounts between the PGA Tour and the Nationwide Tour.

In 1994, he won the Shell Houston Open in just his 10th start on the PGA Tour.

== Personal life ==
Heinen lives in Lake Charles, Louisiana with his wife and three children.

== Professional wins (1) ==
=== PGA Tour wins (1) ===
No.	Date	Tournament	Winning score	Margin of victory	Runners-up
1	May 1, 1994	Shell Houston Open	−16 (67-68-69-68=272)	3 strokes	(United States) Tom Kite, (United States) Jeff Maggert, (United States) Hal Sutton

PGA Tour playoff record (0–1)

No.	Year	Tournament	Opponent	Result
1	1995	Freeport-McMoRan Classic	(United States) Davis Love III	Lost to birdie on second extra hole

== Playoff record ==
Buy.com Tour playoff record (0–2)

No.	Year	Tournament	Opponent(s)	Result
1	2000	Buy.com Ozarks Open	(United States) Pat Bates, (United States) Pat Perez	Perez won with birdie on first extra hole
2	2002	Louisiana Open	(New Zealand) Steven Alker	Lost to par on second extra hole

== Results in major championships ==
Tournament	1994	1995	1996
Masters Tournament		CUT	
U.S. Open		CUT	CUT
PGA Championship	CUT	CUT	

Note: Heinen never played in The Open Championship.

Did not play

CUT = missed the half-way cut

== See also ==
- 1993 PGA Tour Qualifying School graduates
- 2002 PGA Tour Qualifying School graduates
