= 1994 Nike Tour =

Golf tour season

1994 Nike Tour season
- Duration: February 3, 1994 – October 16, 1994
- Number of official events: 28
- Most wins: (United States) Jerry Haas (3)
- Money list: (United States) Chris Perry
- Player of the Year: (United States) Chris Perry

The 1994 Nike Tour was the fifth season of the Nike Tour, the official development tour to the PGA Tour.

== Schedule ==
The following table lists official events during the 1994 season.

Date	Tournament	Location	Purse (US$)	Winner (Note: The number in parentheses after each winner's name is the number of Nike Tour events they had won up to and including that tournament. This information is only shown for Nike Tour members. It is rare for someone to accumulate many wins on the Nike Tour as success at this level usually leads to promotion to the PGA Tour.)	Notes
Feb 6	Nike Inland Empire Open	California	200,000	(United States) Skip Kendall (1)	New tournament
Mar 6	Nike Monterrey Open	Mexico	200,000	(United States) Scott Gump (1)	
Mar 27	Nike Louisiana Open	Louisiana	175,000	(United States) Bill Porter (1)	
Apr 3	Nike Pensacola Classic	Florida	200,000	(United States) Bruce Vaughan (1)	
Apr 10	Nike Mississippi Gulf Coast Classic	Mississippi	175,000	(United States) John Elliott (1)	
Apr 17	Nike Panama City Beach Classic	Florida	175,000	(United States) Keith Fergus (1)	
Apr 24	Nike Shreveport Open	Louisiana	175,000	(United States) Omar Uresti (1)	
May 1	Nike Alabama Classic	Alabama	200,000	(United States) Tommy Tolles (2)	New tournament
May 8	Nike South Carolina Classic	South Carolina	175,000	(United States) Charlie Rymer (1)	
May 15	Nike Central Georgia Open	Georgia	175,000	(United States) Rick Pearson (3)	
May 22	Nike Knoxville Open	Tennessee	200,000	(United States) Vic Wilk (1)	
May 29	Nike Greater Greenville Classic	South Carolina	175,000	(United States) Scott Gump (2)	
Jun 5	Nike Miami Valley Open	Ohio	200,000	(United States) Tommy Armour III (1)	
Jun 12	Nike Cleveland Open	Ohio	200,000	(United States) Tommy Armour III (2)	
Jun 19	Nike Dominion Open	Virginia	200,000	(United States) Sonny Skinner (2)	
Jun 26	Nike Carolina Classic	North Carolina	200,000	(United States) Skip Kendall (2)	New tournament
Jul 24	Nike Gateway Classic	Missouri	200,000	(United States) Brad Fabel (1)	New tournament
Aug 1	Nike Wichita Open	Kansas	175,000	(United States) Dennis Postlewait (1)	
Aug 7	Nike Dakota Dunes Open	South Dakota	200,000	(United States) Pat Bates (1)	
Aug 14	Nike Ozarks Open	Missouri	200,000	(United States) Jerry Haas (1)	
Aug 21	Nike Texarkana Open	Arkansas	200,000	(United States) Mike Brisky (1)	
Aug 28	Nike Permian Basin Open	Texas	175,000	(United States) Bruce Vaughan (2)	
Sep 4	Nike New Mexico Charity Classic	New Mexico	175,000	(United States) Jim Carter (1)	
Sep 11	Nike Utah Classic	Utah	175,000	(United States) Chris Perry (1)	
Sep 18	Nike Boise Open	Idaho	200,000	(United States) Keith Fergus (2)	
Sep 25	Nike Tri-Cities Open	Washington	175,000	(United States) Jerry Haas (2)	
Oct 2	Nike Sonoma County Open	California	175,000	(United States) Jerry Haas (3)	
Oct 16	Nike Tour Championship	Oregon	225,000	(United States) Mike Schuchart (2)	Tour Championship

== Money list ==
The money list was based on prize money won during the season, calculated in U.S. dollars. The top 10 players on the money list earned status to play on the 1995 PGA Tour.

Position	Player	Prize money ($)
1	(United States) Chris Perry	167,148
2	(United States) Scott Gump	161,035
3	(United States) Pat Bates	155,469
4	(United States) Jim Carter	142,750
5	(United States) Skip Kendall	131,067

== Awards ==
Award	Winner	Ref.
Player of the Year (Jack Nicklaus Trophy)	(United States) Chris Perry	
