= Olin Browne =

American professional golfer (born 1959)

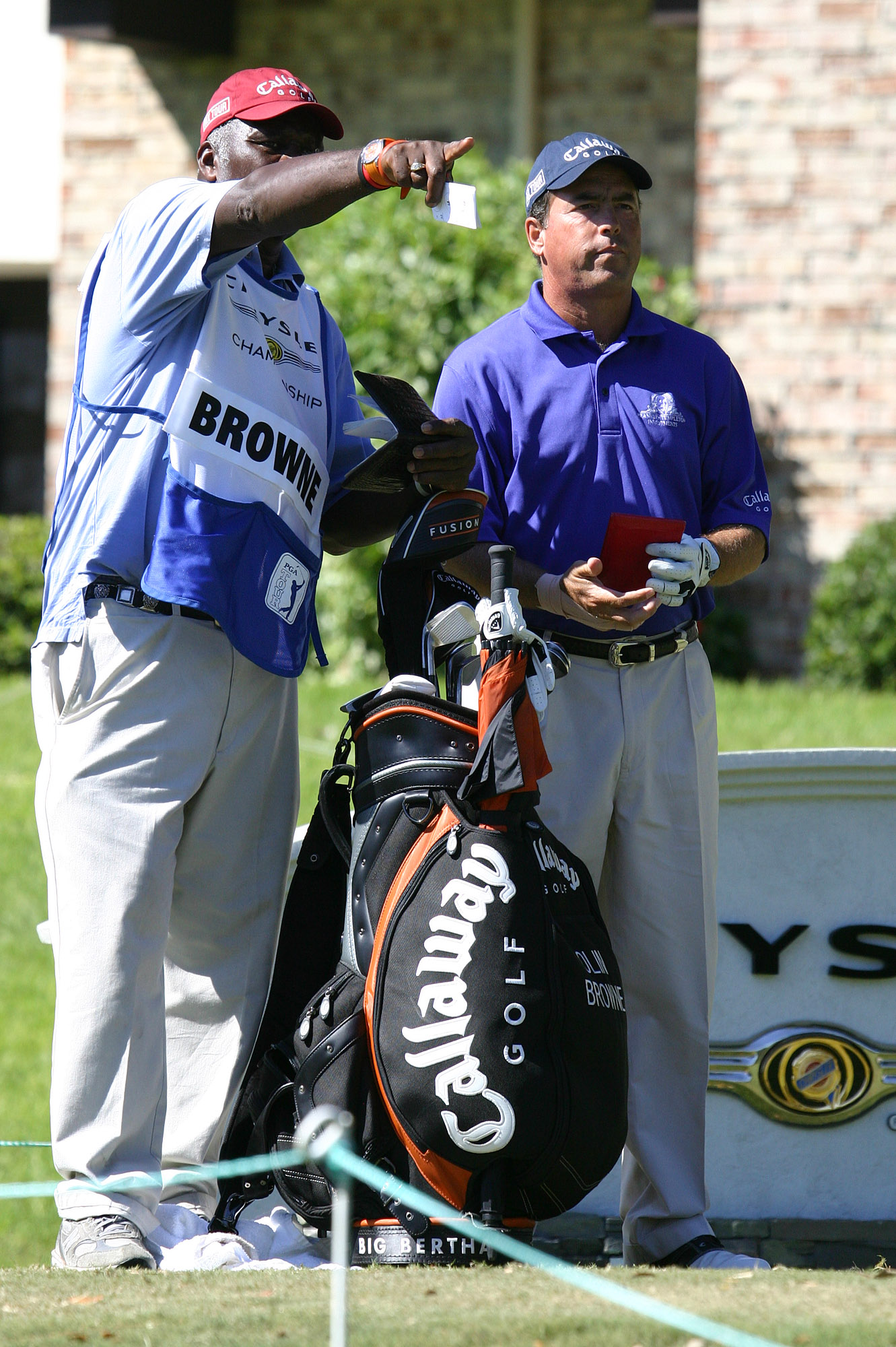

Personal information
- Full name: Olin Douglas Browne
- Nationality: United States
- Born: May 22, 1959 (age 67) Washington, D.C., U.S.
- Height: 5 ft 9 in (1.75 m)
- Weight: 175 lb (79 kg; 12.5 st)

Career
- Sport: Golf
- College: Occidental College
- Turned professional: 1984
- Current tour: PGA Tour Champions
- Former tour: PGA Tour
- Professional wins: 9
- Highest ranking: 48 (June 6, 1999)

Number of wins by tour
- PGA Tour: 3
- Korn Ferry Tour: 4
- PGA Tour Champions: 2
- Other: 1

Best results in major championships
- Masters Tournament: 45th: 2006
- PGA Championship: T46: 2006
- U.S. Open: T5: 1997
- The Open Championship: DNP

Achievements and awards
- PGA Tour Comeback Player of the Year: 2005

Olin Douglas Browne (born May 22, 1959) is an American professional golfer who played on the PGA Tour and now plays on the PGA Tour Champions.

== Early life and amateur career ==
Browne was born in Washington, D.C. In 1977, he graduated from Holderness School in Plymouth, New Hampshire. In 1981, he graduated from Occidental College.

== Professional career ==
In 1984, Browne turned professional. He has won three times on the PGA Tour.

At the 1998 Masters Tournament, Browne and Scott Simpson both carded a quadruple bogey on the opening hole of the first round - the worst start in the history of the tournament.

On August 8, 2007, Browne was named one of the assistant captains for the 2008 United States Ryder Cup team.

Browne qualified for the 2005 U.S. Open at Pinehurst by shooting a final round 59 in the qualifying tournament. He shared the lead the first two days of the Open, dropping into a tie for second going into the final day. He shot a final round 80 to drop to T-23rd.

=== Senior career ===
Browne played in his first Champions Tour event in 2009 at The Principal Charity Classic, where he shared the first round lead but struggled on the weekend. He captured his first Champions Tour victory at the 2011 U.S. Senior Open, making his maiden win on tour a senior major championship. Browne held off the challenge of Mark O'Meara on Sunday to prevail by three strokes and become only the fifth player in professional golf history to win on the Nationwide Tour, the PGA Tour and the Champions Tour.

Browne has worked as an analyst for ESPN as on-course reporter during the network's golf telecasts.

He is currently a member of Wolferts Roost Country Club in Albany, New York.

== Personal life ==
Browne lives in Hobe Sound, Florida.

Browne has a son, Olin Jr., who is also a professional golfer.

== Professional wins (9) ==
=== PGA Tour wins (3) ===
No.	Date	Tournament	Winning score	Margin of victory	Runner(s)-up
1	Jul 5, 1998	Canon Greater Hartford Open	−14 (66-66-67-67=266)	Playoff	(United States) Stewart Cink, (United States) Larry Mize
2	May 23, 1999	MasterCard Colonial	−8 (73-67-66-66=272)	1 stroke	(United States) Fred Funk, (United States) Paul Goydos, (United States) Tim Herron, (United States) Greg Kraft, (United States) Jeff Sluman
3	Sep 5, 2005	Deutsche Bank Championship	−14 (68-65-70-67=270)	1 stroke	(United States) Jason Bohn

PGA Tour playoff record (1–0)

No.	Year	Tournament	Opponents	Result
1	1998	Canon Greater Hartford Open	(United States) Stewart Cink, (United States) Larry Mize	Won with birdie on first extra hole

=== Nike Tour wins (4) ===
No.	Date	Tournament	Winning score	Margin of victory	Runners-up
1	Feb 3, 1991	Ben Hogan Bakersfield Open	−9 (69-70-68=207)	4 strokes	(United States) Bob Friend, (United States) Ron Streck
2	Jul 21, 1991	Ben Hogan Hawkeye Open	−14 (67-65-67=199)	2 strokes	(United States) John Ross, (United States) Ted Tryba
3	Mar 7, 1993	Nike Monterrey Open	−12 (71-71-67-67=276)	1 stroke	(United States) Lon Hinkle, (United States) Stan Utley
4	Jun 2, 1996	Nike Dominion Open	−12 (67-69-73-67=276)	1 stroke	(United States) Michael Christie, (United States) Rob McKelvey

Nike Tour playoff record (0–1)

No.	Year	Tournament	Opponent	Result
1	1990	Ben Hogan Greater Ozarks Open	(United States) Jeff Cook	Lost to birdie on first extra hole

=== Other wins (1) ===
No.	Date	Tournament	Winning score	Margin of victory	Runner-up
1	Nov 18, 2001	Callaway Golf Pebble Beach Invitational	−17 (66-66-68-71=271)	Playoff	(United States) Todd Barrangen

Other playoff record (1–0)

No.	Year	Tournament	Opponent	Result
1	2001	Callaway Golf Pebble Beach Invitational	(United States) Todd Barrangen	Won with birdie on third extra hole

=== PGA Tour Champions wins (2) ===
Legend
Senior major championships (1)
Other PGA Tour Champions (1)

No.	Date	Tournament	Winning score	Margin of victory	Runner-up
1	Jul 31, 2011	U.S. Senior Open	−15 (64-69-65-71=269)	3 strokes	(United States) Mark O'Meara
2	Apr 18, 2015	Greater Gwinnett Championship	−12 (68-64=132) (Note: Shortened to 36 holes due to weather.)	1 stroke	(Germany) Bernhard Langer

PGA Tour Champions playoff record (0–2)

No.	Year	Tournament	Opponent(s)	Result
1	2013	Greater Hickory Kia Classic at Rock Barn	(United States) Michael Allen	Lost to birdie on first extra hole
2	2019	Chubb Classic	(Spain) Miguel Ángel Jiménez, (Germany) Bernhard Langer	Jiménez won with par on first extra hole

== Results in major championships ==
Tournament	1994	1995	1996	1997	1998	1999
Masters Tournament					CUT	T52
U.S. Open	T47		T101	T5	T43	CUT
PGA Championship				T53	T62	T49

Tournament	2000	2001	2002	2003	2004	2005	2006	2007	2008	2009
Masters Tournament							45			
U.S. Open		T24	CUT	T59		T23	CUT	T45		
PGA Championship		CUT					T46			

Tournament	2010	2011	2012
Masters Tournament			
U.S. Open			CUT
PGA Championship			

Note: Browne never played in The Open Championship.

Top 10
Did not play

CUT = missed the half-way cut
"T" = tied

=== Summary ===
Tournament	Wins	2nd	3rd	Top-5	Top-10	Top-25	Events	Cuts made
Masters Tournament	0	0	0	0	0	0	3	2
U.S. Open	0	0	0	1	1	3	12	8
The Open Championship	0	0	0	0	0	0	0	0
PGA Championship	0	0	0	0	0	0	5	4
Totals	0	0	0	1	1	3	20	14

- Most consecutive cuts made – 4 (1994 U.S. Open – 1997 PGA)
- Longest streak of top-10s – 1

== Results in The Players Championship ==
Tournament	1997	1998	1999	2000	2001	2002	2003	2004	2005	2006	2007
The Players Championship	CUT	CUT	CUT	T77	CUT	CUT	CUT			T66	CUT

Did not play

CUT = missed the halfway cut
"T" indicates a tie for a place

== Results in World Golf Championships ==
Tournament	2000	2001	2002	2003	2004	2005	2006
Match Play	R64						
Championship		NT^{1}				T37	
Invitational							T50

^{1}Cancelled due to 9/11

Did not play

QF, R16, R32, R64 = Round in which player lost in match play
"T" = Tied
NT = No tournament

== Senior major championships ==
=== Wins (1) ===
Year	Championship	54 holes	Winning score	Margin	Runner-up
2011	U.S. Senior Open	2 shot lead	−15 (64-69-65-71=269)	3 strokes	(United States) Mark O'Meara

=== Senior results timeline ===
Results not in chronological order.

Tournament	2009	2010	2011	2012	2013	2014	2015	2016	2017	2018	2019	2020	2021	2022	2023	2024	2025	2026
Senior PGA Championship		T15	T13	CUT			T17	T16	T55	T23	T60	NT	T55	38				
The Tradition	T44	T34	T55	T53		T3	T32	2	T27	T25	T22	NT	T51		T40			
U.S. Senior Open	10	T3	1	T36		T47	T38	T18	T12	CUT	CUT	NT	CUT	CUT		T16	CUT	CUT
Senior Players Championship	T34	T11	T17	3		T39	T12	6	T71	71	T18	73	71	T71	T44	T67		
Senior British Open Championship	T38	T26	T23	T18		T21	74	T23	T45			NT						

Win
Top 10
Did not play

CUT = missed the halfway cut
"T" indicates a tie for a place
NT = no tournament due to COVID-19 pandemic

== See also ==
- 1991 Ben Hogan Tour graduates
- 1993 Nike Tour graduates
- 1995 PGA Tour Qualifying School graduates
- List of golfers with most Web.com Tour wins
