= Stan Utley =

American professional golfer (born 1962)

Personal information
- Full name: Stanley Frank Utley
- Nationality: United States
- Born: January 16, 1962 (age 64) Thayer, Missouri, U.S.
- Height: 6 ft 0 in (1.83 m)
- Weight: 170 lb (77 kg; 12 st)
- Children: Jake, Tatum

Career
- Sport: Golf
- College: University of Missouri
- Turned professional: 1984
- Former tours: PGA Tour; Champions Tour; Nationwide Tour
- Professional wins: 7

Number of wins by tour
- PGA Tour: 1
- Korn Ferry Tour: 3
- Other: 3

Best results in major championships
- Masters Tournament: DNP
- PGA Championship: T49: 1990
- U.S. Open: 61st: 1991
- The Open Championship: DNP

Stanley Frank Utley (born January 16, 1962) is an American professional golfer who has played on the PGA Tour, Nationwide Tour, and Champions Tour.

== Early life and amateur career ==
Utley was born and raised in Thayer, a small town in southern Missouri.

Utley attended the University of Missouri where he was a distinguished member of the golf team, a three-time all-Big Eight selection and two-time All-American. Utley led Missouri to the Big Eight Championship in 1984. He also led the Tigers to two NCAA appearances where they placed 13th and 14th respectively, in 1983 and 1984.

== Professional career ==
In 1984, Utley turned professional. In 1989, he won the PGA Tour's Chattanooga Classic on a sponsor exemption, earning membership on the tour. He lost his PGA Tour card in 1992 and decided to play on the Nike Tour. In the 1990s, he played primarily in on this tour. Utley holds the PGA Tour record for fewest putts in nine holes, with six at the 2002 Air Canada Championship.

As his touring career was winding down, Utley began to develop new career strategies for taking advantage of his reputation as one of the best chippers and putters in the game. He began a transition into teaching and writing with special focus on his specialty - the short game. Utley has risen to prominence as one of the best instructors in golf. His list of current and former students on the PGA, Korn Ferry, Champions and LPGA Tours includes Jay Haas, Sergio García, Joaquín Niemann, Scott Langley, Kevin Streelman, Scott Piercy, Paige Mackenzie, Amanda Blumenherst, Darren Clarke, Brandt Jobe, Rocco Mediate, Alex Norén, Inbee Park, Paul McGinley and Bill Haas. In addition, he still plays sporadically. Utley made his Champions Tour debut when he qualified for the 2012 Toshiba Classic.

== Personal life ==
Utley is a man of strong Christian faith. He and wife, Elayna, have a daughter and a son. They live in Scottsdale, Arizona.

== Awards and honors ==
- Golf Digest has called Utley one of America's 50 greatest teachers in their annual poll of more than 1,500 teaching professionals from around the country. He ranked 20th on the 2019-2020 list.
- Utley was elected to the University of Missouri Athletics Hall of Fame in 1995, the first golfer ever chosen.

== Professional wins (7) ==
=== PGA Tour wins (1) ===
No.	Date	Tournament	Winning score	Margin of victory	Runner-up
1	Aug 27, 1989	Chattanooga Classic	−17 (69-66-64-64=263)	3 strokes	(Canada) Ray Stewart

=== Nike Tour wins (3) ===
No.	Date	Tournament	Winning score	Margin of victory	Runner-up
1	Jun 13, 1993	Nike Cleveland Open	−17 (69-69-68-65=263)	3 strokes	(United States) Jerry Kelly
2	Mar 26, 1995	Nike Louisiana Open	−20 (70-70-66-62=268)	2 strokes	(United States) Keith Fergus
3	Jun 11, 1995	Nike Miami Valley Open	−20 (71-62-66-65=264)	4 strokes	(United States) Jon Hough, (United States) Steve Jurgensen

Nike Tour playoff record (0–1)

No.	Year	Tournament	Opponent	Result
1	1999	Nike South Florida Classic	(United States) Curt Byrum	Lost to par on first extra hole

=== Other wins (3) ===
- 1986 Kansas Open
- 1988 Missouri Open
- 1989 Missouri Open

== Results in major championships ==
Tournament	1986	1987	1988	1989	1990	1991
U.S. Open	CUT			CUT		61
PGA Championship					T49	CUT

Note: Utley never played in the Masters Tournament or The Open Championship.

Did not play

CUT = missed the half-way cut
"T" = tied

== See also ==
- 1993 Nike Tour graduates
- List of male golfers
