= Emlyn Aubrey =

American professional golfer (born 1964)

Personal information
- Nationality: United States
- Born: January 28, 1964 (age 62) Reading, Pennsylvania, U.S.
- Height: 6 ft 2 in (1.88 m)
- Weight: 185 lb (84 kg; 13.2 st)

Career
- Sport: Golf
- College: Louisiana State University
- Turned professional: 1986
- Former tours: PGA Tour; Nationwide Tour
- Professional wins: 4

Number of wins by tour
- Korn Ferry Tour: 2
- Other: 2

Best results in major championships
- Masters Tournament: DNP
- PGA Championship: T24: 1996
- U.S. Open: T29: 1989
- The Open Championship: 75th: 1989

Emlyn Aubrey (born January 28, 1964) is an American professional golfer who played on the PGA Tour, Nationwide Tour and the predecessor to the Asian Tour.

== Amateur career ==
Aubrey attended Louisiana State University where he was an honorable mention All-American in 1984 and third team All-American in 1986. He was also second team All-Southeastern Conference (SEC) in 1983 and first team All-SEC in 1984 and 1986. He won the individual SEC Championship in 1984 and was part of a LSU team that included David Toms that won the 1986 SEC Team Championship.

== Professional career ==
In 1986, Aubrey turned pro. He joined the PGA Tour in 1990, earning his card through qualifying school. In his rookie year on Tour he recorded two top-10 finishes and finished 126th on the money list. In 1991 he wasn't able to crack the top-15 in any tournaments and finished 139th on the money list, forcing him to earn his card through qualifying school for the second time. He struggled on Tour in 1992 and joined the Nationwide Tour in 1993. He had a successful rookie year on Tour, winning the Nike Miami Valley Open while recording four top-10 finishes including a runner up. In 1994 he missed no cuts while recording eight top-10 finishes including three runner up finishes en route to a 10th-place finish on the money list which earned him his PGA Tour card for 1995. In his return to the PGA Tour, he finished 140th on the money list while recording a top-10 finish. He played on the PGA Tour part-time in 1996 but it was his best year on Tour. He recorded two top-5 finishes including a runner up finish at the Greater Vancouver Open. This success helped him finish 74th on the money list. He didn't do as well in 1997 and he returned to the Nationwide Tour in 1998 where he won the Nike Wichita Open and recorded ten top-10 finishes en route to a 13th-place finish on the money list, good enough for a PGA Tour card for 1999. In 1999 he recorded three top-10 finishes en route to a 136th-place finish on the money list, good enough for partial status on the Tour the following year. He had a poor year on Tour in 2000 and returned to the Nationwide Tour in 2001 where he played on and off until 2008.

Aubrey also played on the Asia Golf Circuit in 1988, 1989 and 1994. He won the Philippine Open in 1989 and the Indian Open in 1994.

He currently coaches both the men and women's golf teams at the Centenary College of Louisiana.

== Professional wins (4) ==
=== Asia Golf Circuit wins (2) ===
| No. | Date | Tournament | Winning score | Margin of victory | Runner-up |
|---|---|---|---|---|---|
| 1 | Feb 12, 1989 | San Miguel/Coca-Cola Philippine Open | −8 (69-71-69-67=276) | 2 strokes | (Philippines) Mario Siodina |
| 2 | Mar 6, 1994 | Classic Indian Open | −3 (69-70-76-70=285) | 1 stroke | (United States) Brandt Jobe |

=== Nike Tour wins (2) ===
| No. | Date | Tournament | Winning score | Margin of victory | Runner(s)-up |
|---|---|---|---|---|---|
| 1 | May 23, 1993 | Nike Miami Valley Open | −11 (65-72-65=202) | 4 strokes | (United States) Larry Silveira |
| 2 | Jul 26, 1998 | Nike Wichita Open | −23 (66-61-71-67=265) | 1 stroke | (United States) Carl Paulson, (United States) Anthony Rodriguez |

== Results in major championships ==
| Tournament | 1988 | 1989 | 1990 | 1991 | 1992 | 1993 | 1994 | 1995 | 1996 |
|---|---|---|---|---|---|---|---|---|---|
| U.S. Open | CUT | T29 | CUT | | | | T62 | | CUT |
| The Open Championship | | 75 | | | | | | | |
| PGA Championship | | | | | | | | | T24 |

Did not play

CUT = missed the half-way cut
"T" = tied
Note: Aubrey never played in the Masters Tournament.

== See also ==
- 1989 PGA Tour Qualifying School graduates
- 1991 PGA Tour Qualifying School graduates
- 1994 Nike Tour graduates
- 1998 Nike Tour graduates
