= 2009 FedEx Cup Playoffs =

Tournament information
- Dates: August 27 – September 27, 2009
- Location: Liberty National Golf Club; TPC Boston; Cog Hill Golf & Country Club; East Lake Golf Club
- Tour: PGA Tour

Statistics
- Field: 125 for The Barclays; 100 for Deutsche Bank; 70 for BMW Championship; 30 for Tour Championship
- Prize fund: $35,000,000 bonus money
- Winner's share: $10,000,000 bonus money

Champion
- (United States) Tiger Woods
- 4,000 points

The 2009 FedEx Cup Playoffs, the series of four golf tournaments that determined the season champion on the U.S.-based PGA Tour, began on August 27 and ended on September 27. It included the following four events:

- The Barclays — Liberty National Golf Club, Jersey City, New Jersey
- Deutsche Bank Championship — TPC Boston, Norton, Massachusetts
- BMW Championship — Cog Hill Golf & Country Club, Lemont, Illinois
- The Tour Championship — East Lake Golf Club, Atlanta, Georgia

For the second time in the three-year history of the playoffs, Tiger Woods won the FedEx Cup.

These were the third FedEx Cup playoffs since their inception in 2007. Substantial changes were made to the point structures, playoff reset of points, and field sizes for 2009.

The point distributions can be seen here.

== Regular season rankings ==
Place	Player	Points	Events
1	(United States) Tiger Woods	3,341	13
2	(United States) Steve Stricker	2,155	18
3	(United States) Zach Johnson	2,019	21
4	(United States) Kenny Perry	1,943	20
5	(United States) Lucas Glover	1,742	22
6	(United States) Phil Mickelson	1,630	14
7	(South Korea) Yang Yong-eun	1,621	19
8	(Australia) Geoff Ogilvy	1,603	16
9	(United States) Brian Gay	1,540	21
10	(United States) Sean O'Hair	1,474	19

== The Barclays ==
The Barclays was played August 27–30. Of the 125 players eligible to play in the event, only one did not enter—Paul Casey (18), due to a rib injury. Of the 124 entrants, 77 made the second-round cut at +5.

Heath Slocum, who only made the top 125 and the tournament field by two FedEx Cup points, won by sinking a 20-foot (6 m) par putt on the final hole, putting him one shot ahead of a distinguished group consisting of Ernie Els, Pádraig Harrington, Steve Stricker, and Tiger Woods. The top 100 players in the points standings advanced to the Deutsche Bank Championship.

					FedEx Cup rank	
Place	Player	Score	To par	Winnings ($)	After	Before
1	(United States) Heath Slocum	66-72-70-67=275	−9	1,350,000	3	124
T2	(South Africa) Ernie Els	72-68-70-66=276	−8	495,000	11	47
T2	(Republic of Ireland) Pádraig Harrington	67-75-67-67=276	−8	495,000	14	66
T2	(United States) Tiger Woods	70-72-67-67=276	−8	495,000	1	1
T2	(United States) Steve Stricker	69-70-68-69=276	−8	495,000	2	2
T6	(United States) Nick Watney	68-73-69-67=277	−7	260,625	7	13
T6	(Sweden) Freddie Jacobson	66-72-68-71=277	−7	260,625	48	107
8	(United States) Webb Simpson	66-68-72-72=278	−6	232,500	41	85
T9	(United States) Scott Verplank	73-70-68-68=279	−5	202,500	37	61
T9	(England) Ian Poulter	67-72-70-70=279	−5	202,500	21	34
T9	(United States) Paul Goydos	65-71-68-75=279	−5	202,500	33	49

== Deutsche Bank Championship ==
The Deutsche Bank Championship was played September 4–7. Of the 100 players eligible to play in the event, only one did not enter—Paul Casey (27), due to a rib injury. Of the 99 players who entered the tournament, 73 of them made the 36-hole cut at one-under-par. Steve Stricker won by one stroke over Jason Dufner and Scott Verplank and took the lead in the FedEx Cup standings. The top 70 players in the points standings advanced to the BMW Championship.

					FedEx Cup rank	
Place	Player	Score	To par	Winnings ($)	After	Before
1	(United States) Steve Stricker	63-72-65-67=267	−17	1,350,000	1	2
T2	(United States) Jason Dufner	66-69-68-65=268	−16	660,000	9	57
T2	(United States) Scott Verplank	65-68-68-67=268	−16	660,000	5	37
T4	(Argentina) Ángel Cabrera	65-69-70-65=269	−15	310,000	22	38
T4	(Republic of Ireland) Pádraig Harrington	67-67-67-68=269	−15	310,000	7	14
T4	(United States) Dustin Johnson	68-65-70-66=269	−15	310,000	10	20
7	(Australia) Geoff Ogilvy	66-68-70-66=270	−14	251,250	8	12
T8	(United States) Jim Furyk	63-67-73-68=271	−13	217,500	18	18
T8	(South Africa) Retief Goosen	65-67-68-71=271	−13	217,500	17	17
T8	(United States) Sean O'Hair	66-64-70-71=271	−13	217,500	16	16

== BMW Championship ==
The BMW Championship was played September 10–13. Of the 70 players eligible to play in the event, only one did not enter—Paul Casey (36), due to a rib injury. With a field limited to 70, and 69 actually playing, there was no cut. The top 30 players in FedEx Cup points after this event advanced to the Tour Championship and also earned spots in the 2010 Masters, U.S. Open, and (British) Open Championship.

Tiger Woods blew away the field in Saturday's third round with a course-record 62 and cruised from there to win by eight shots over Jim Furyk and Marc Leishman. Woods retook the lead in the FedEx Cup standings going into the Tour Championship. Furyk moved from 18th in the standings to third, putting him into position to claim the FedEx Cup with a win in the Tour Championship. Leishman, who only made the field for the BMW Championship by making an eagle on the final hole of the Deutsche Bank Championship, placed himself in the field for the Tour Championship.

The real drama was for the 30th and final spot in the Tour Championship. Brandt Snedeker was in the final 30 until disaster struck on the final hole. Needing only a bogey to secure his place in Atlanta, and on the green of the par-4 hole in three, he missed his par putt from 12 feet and then had his 3-foot putt for bogey lip out. Snedeker then two-putted from tap-in range. That opened the door for John Senden and Ian Poulter, but both seemingly tried to throw away their shots at a trip to Atlanta. Senden badly chucked his approach shot to the par-5 15th, and hit a bunker shot into the water on 17 for a double-bogey, but Snedeker's mistake allowed him to sneak into the top 30 by 0.46 points over Poulter, who hit his approach on the 18th hole into the water.

With the FedEx Cup points reset after the BMW Championship, all 30 remaining players had at least a mathematical chance to secure the season crown, and any of the top five players could claim the FedEx Cup with a win in the Tour Championship.

					FedEx Cup rank	
Place	Player	Score	To par	Winnings ($)	After	Before
1	(United States) Tiger Woods	68-67-62-68=265	−19	1,350,000	1	2
T2	(United States) Jim Furyk	70-70-67-66=273	−11	660,000	3	18
T2	(Australia) Marc Leishman	67-69-68-69=273	−11	660,000	16	67
4	(United States) Sean O'Hair	70-68-70-68=274	−10	360,000	7	16
5	(United States) Zach Johnson	73-65-70-68=276	−8	300,000	4	4
T6	(Spain) Sergio García	71-68-68-71=278	−6	260,625	38	55
T6	(Republic of Ireland) Pádraig Harrington	68-68-69-73=278	−6	260,625	6	7
T8	(Colombia) Camilo Villegas	68-74-71-66=279	−5	225,000	42	52
T8	(United States) Kevin Na	72-72-65-70=279	−5	225,000	18	23
T10	(England) Luke Donald	70-69-68-73=280	−4	172,500	28	32
T10	(United States) Bill Haas	71-68-71-70=280	−4	172,500	41	47
T10	(United States) Matt Kuchar	71-68-66-75=280	−4	172,500	40	46
T10	(United States) Brandt Snedeker	69-69-66-76=280	−4	172,500	33	42
T10	(United States) Mark Wilson	69-66-71-74=280	−4	172,500	32	41

== Reset points ==
The points were reset after the BMW Championship.

Place	Player	Points	Reset points	Events
1	(United States) Tiger Woods	7,108	2,500	16
2	(United States) Steve Stricker	5,692	2,250	21
3	(United States) Jim Furyk	3,108	2,000	21
4	(United States) Zach Johnson	3,031	1,800	24
5	(United States) Heath Slocum	3,005	1,600	26
6	(Republic of Ireland) Pádraig Harrington	2,633	1,400	19
7	(United States) Sean O'Hair	2,624	1,200	22
8	(United States) Scott Verplank	2,416	1,000	23
9	(United States) Kenny Perry	2,318	800	23
10	(United States) Jason Dufner	2,224	600	25

== The Tour Championship ==
The Tour Championship was played September 24–27, after a one-week break. All 30 golfers who qualified for the tournament played, and there was no cut.

Phil Mickelson claimed his first PGA Tour title since his wife and mother were both diagnosed with breast cancer in spring 2009. This was also his second Tour Championship title, as he won the 2000 edition, also held at East Lake. Mickelson entered the final round four shots behind Kenny Perry, but shot 65 while Perry faded to a 74. Three golfers—top seed Tiger Woods, second seed Steve Stricker, and Mickelson—had a reasonable chance of claiming the FedEx Cup entering the final nine holes, but consecutive birdies by Woods on the 15th and 16th holes secured his second-place finish for the tournament, three shots behind Mickelson. Since Mickelson was not among the top five seeds entering the Tour Championship, this was enough for Woods to secure the FedEx Cup and its $10 million prize.

					FedEx Cup rank	
Place	Player	Score	To par	Winnings ($)	After	Before
1	(United States) Phil Mickelson	73-67-66-65=271	−9	1,350,000	2	14
2	(United States) Tiger Woods	67-68-69-70=274	−6	810,000	1	1
3	(United States) Sean O'Hair	66-70-70-69=275	−5	517,500	5	7
T4	(Republic of Ireland) Pádraig Harrington	67-69-71-69=276	−4	330,000	7	6
T4	(United States) Kenny Perry	72-66-64-74=276	−4	330,000	9	9
6	(United States) Steve Stricker	70-72-66-69=277	−3	270,000	3	2
T7	(United States) Jim Furyk	72-68-71-67=278	−2	247,500	4	3
T7	(United States) Steve Marino	69-71-67-71=278	−2	247,500	15	25
9	(South Africa) Ernie Els	71-66-71-71=279	−1	225,000	16	22
T10	(United States) Lucas Glover	68-71-72-69=280	E	202,500	17	20
T10	(United States) Jerry Kelly	71-67-71-71=280	E	202,500	22	29
T10	(Australia) John Senden	70-70-69-71=280	E	202,500	24	30

== Final leaderboard ==
Place	Player	Points	Winnings ($)
1	(United States) Tiger Woods	4,000	10,000,000
2	(United States) Phil Mickelson	2,920	3,000,000
3	(United States) Steve Stricker	2,750	2,000,000
4	(United States) Jim Furyk	2,437	1,500,000
5	(United States) Sean O'Hair	2,200	1,000,000
6	(United States) Zach Johnson	2,072	800,000
7	(Republic of Ireland) Pádraig Harrington	2,050	700,000
8	(United States) Heath Slocum	1,855	600,000
9	(United States) Kenny Perry	1,450	550,000
10	(United States) Scott Verplank	1,245	500,000

For the full list see here.

== Table of qualifying players ==
Table key:

Win
Top-10 finish
Did not advance to next tournament
Played way into next tournament

	Player	Pre-Playoffs		The Barclays		Deutsche Bank		BMW Champ.		Reset points	Tour Champ.	
	Player	Points	Rank	Finish	Rank after	Finish	Rank after	Finish	Rank after	Reset points	Finish	Final rank
(United States)	Tiger Woods	3,431	1	T2	1	T11	2	1	1	2,500	2	1
(United States)	Steve Stricker	2,155	2	T2	2	1	1	T53	2	2,250	6	3
(United States)	Zach Johnson	2,019	3	T28	4	T19	4	5	4	1,800	T16	6
(United States)	Kenny Perry	1,993	4	T52	5	T46	6	T45	9	800	T4	9
(United States)	Lucas Glover	1,742	5	CUT	9	T36	14	66	20	310	T10	17
(United States)	Phil Mickelson	1,630	6	T52	10	T27	12	T30	14	420	1	2
(South Korea)	Yong-eun Yang*	1,621	7	T20	6	T67	15	65	21	300	18	23
(Australia)	Geoff Ogilvy	1,603	8	CUT	12	7	8	T55	13	440	T16	13
(United States)	Brian Gay	1,540	9	T12	8	T54	13	T55	17	360	T28	21
(United States)	Sean O'Hair	1,474	10	CUT	16	T8	16	4	7	1,200	3	5
(South Africa)	Retief Goosen	1,459	11	T70	17	T8	17	T23	15	400	23	18
(United States)	David Toms	1,394	12	T31	13	T36	19	T23	19	320	T13	19
(United States)	Nick Watney	1,388	13	T6	7	T46	11	T30	12	460	T13	12
(United States)	Hunter Mahan	1,282	14	T20	15	T36	21	T38	23	280	24	27
(United States)	Stewart Cink	1,225	15	T28	19	CUT	25	T23	26	250	T19	28
(United States)	Jim Furyk	1,188	16	T15	18	T8	18	T2	3	2,000	T7	4
(South Africa)	Rory Sabbatini	1,163	17	CUT	26	CUT	35	T18	34	–	–	34
(England)	Paul Casey	1,161	18	DNP	27	DNP	36	DNP	52	–	–	52
(United States)	Dustin Johnson	1,155	19	T15	20	T4	10	T30	11	480	27	14
(United States)	John Rollins	1,112	20	T73	31	CUT	39	T38	45	–	–	45
(United States)	Jerry Kelly	1,068	21	T52	28	T11	24	T49	29	220	T10	22
(United States)	Ryan Moore	1,023	22	T70	35	CUT	48	T30	47	–	–	47
(United States)	Kevin Na	1,021	23	T24	22	T11	23	T8	18	340	T30	26
(England)	Luke Donald	993	24	T31	25	T54	32	T10	28	230	T25	30
(South Africa)	Tim Clark	980	25	T24	24	CUT	33	T30	36	–	–	36
(Canada)	Mike Weir	968	26	T31	29	T23	27	T20	27	240	T25	29
(Argentina)	Ángel Cabrera	968	27	CUT	38	T4	22	T45	24	270	T13	25
(United States)	Charley Hoffman	963	28	T31	30	T27	28	T61	37	–	–	37
(United States)	Anthony Kim	957	29	T52	34	T36	34	T23	35	–	–	35
(United States)	Steve Marino	938	30	T15	23	T27	26	T18	25	260	T7	15
(Australia)	John Senden	937	31	T64	39	T11	29	T20	30	210	T10	24
(United States)	Charles Howell III	937	32	T70	42	T54	49	T30	49	–	–	49
(United States)	Pat Perez	920	33	CUT	43	T27	38	T49	46	–	–	46
(England)	Ian Poulter	907	34	T9	21	CUT	30	T20	31	–	–	31
(Colombia)	Camilo Villegas	886	35	CUT	50	T61	52	T8	42	–	–	42
(United States)	Davis Love III	851	36	T46	40	T49	44	T49	51	–	–	51
(United States)	Mark Wilson	848	37	T58	47	T27	41	T10	32	–	–	32
(Australia)	Robert Allenby	846	38	T15	32	CUT	40	29	43	–	–	43
(United States)	Justin Leonard	838	39	T31	36	T19	31	T49	39	–	–	39
(England)	Brian Davis	823	40	CUT	52	T49	53	T45	58	–	–	58
(Australia)	Nathan Green	822	41	CUT	53	CUT	65	T53	63	–	–	63
(United States)	Jason Dufner	787	42	CUT	57	T2	9	T30	10	600	T19	11
(United States)	John Mallinger	775	43	T46	49	CUT	57	T38	60	–	–	60
(United States)	John Merrick	762	44	CUT	62	CUT	75	–	–	–	–	75
(United States)	Brett Quigley	760	45	T67	59	T61	71	–	–	–	–	71
(United States)	Bo Van Pelt	743	46	T31	45	CUT	54	T15	50	–	–	50
(South Africa)	Ernie Els	733	47	T2	11	CUT	20	T38	22	290	9	16
(United States)	Ben Crane	727	48	T41	51	T69	58	T45	61	–	–	61
(United States)	Paul Goydos	725	49	T9	33	CUT	43	T67	54	–	–	54
(United States)	Chad Campbell	703	50	T46	54	CUT	70	T23	59	–	–	59
(United States)	Briny Baird	695	51	CUT	70	T61	80	–	–	–	–	80
(United States)	Kevin Sutherland	693	52	T52	58	T15	45	T23	44	–	–	44
(South Korea)	Charlie Wi	683	53	T67	69	T19	50	T38	56	–	–	56
(United States)	Bubba Watson	677	54	CUT	72	T32	59	T15	53	–	–	53
(United States)	Bryce Molder*	669	55	CUT	74	T36	66	T55	64	–	–	64
(United States)	Woody Austin	667	56	CUT	75	T36	68	T55	65	–	–	65
(Australia)	Mathew Goggin	662	57	CUT	76	T46	74	–	–	–	–	74
(United States)	J. J. Henry	657	58	T67	73	T61	83	–	–	–	–	83
(Fiji)	Vijay Singh	647	59	CUT	78	T54	81	–	–	–	–	81
(United States)	Jeff Klauk*	645	60	CUT	79	CUT	90	–	–	–	–	90
(United States)	Scott Verplank	641	61	T9	37	T2	5	T38	8	1,000	22	10
(United States)	J. B. Holmes	635	62	T31	55	68	62	68	69	–	–	69
(United States)	Jason Bohn	631	63	CUT	81	T32	69	T59	68	–	–	68
(United States)	Brandt Snedeker	617	64	T12	44	T32	42	T10	33	–	–	33
(United States)	Bob Estes	611	65	T46	65	T49	64	WD	70	–	–	70
(Republic of Ireland)	Pádraig Harrington	608	66	T2	14	T4	7	T6	6	1,400	T4	7
(Australia)	Jason Day	599	67	T12	46	T19	37	T59	48	–	–	48
(United States)	Jeff Overton	598	68	T73	82	T23	61	T61	67	–	–	67
(United States)	Michael Letzig	597	69	CUT	84	T49	86	–	–	–	–	86
(Canada)	Stephen Ames	592	70	CUT	87	T23	63	T15	55	–	–	55
(United States)	Boo Weekley	590	71	T41	64	T54	73	–	–	–	–	73
(United States)	Jonathan Byrd	581	72	T24	56	T61	60	T61	66	–	–	66
(United States)	Ted Purdy	580	73	CUT	88	CUT	93	–	–	–	–	93
(United States)	Fred Couples	569	74	T41	67	CUT	84	–	–	–	–	84
(United States)	Scott McCarron	566	75	CUT	90	T36	82	–	–	–	–	82
(United States)	Kevin Stadler	557	76	CUT	92	CUT	95	–	–	–	–	95
(United States)	Matt Kuchar	555	77	T28	60	T15	46	T10	40	–	–	40
(Australia)	Marc Leishman*	547	78	CUT	93	T15	67	T2	16	380	T28	20
(Australia)	Greg Chalmers*	543	79	CUT	94	T36	87	–	–	–	–	87
(United States)	Tim Petrovic	543	80	T46	77	CUT	89	–	–	–	–	89
(United States)	D. J. Trahan	542	81	CUT	95	T69	96	–	–	–	–	96
(United States)	Bill Haas	535	82	T24	61	T15	47	T10	41	–	–	41
(United States)	Scott Piercy*	531	83	CUT	96	T36	88	–	–	–	–	88
(United States)	D. A. Points*	531	84	T31	68	T49	72	–	–	–	–	72
(United States)	Webb Simpson*	519	85	8	41	CUT	51	T61	62	–	–	62
(United States)	Kevin Streelman	518	86	T58	89	T32	76	–	–	–	–	76
(Australia)	Nick O'Hern	512	87	CUT	98	CUT	99	–	–	–	–	99
(Australia)	James Nitties*	507	88	T58	91	CUT	94	–	–	–	–	94
(Spain)	Sergio García	501	89	T31	71	26	55	T6	38	–	–	38
(Japan)	Ryuji Imada	499	90	CUT	99	73	100	–	–	–	–	100
(England)	Justin Rose	492	91	T41	80	T54	85	–	–	–	–	85
(South Korea)	K. J. Choi	492	92	CUT	101	–	–	–	–	–	–	101
(United States)	Lee Janzen	491	93	T20	63	CUT	79	–	–	–	–	79
(United States)	Ben Curtis	491	94	CUT	102	–	–	–	–	–	–	102
(United States)	George McNeill	480	95	CUT	105	–	–	–	–	–	–	105
(United States)	Cameron Beckman*	469	96	T58	97	CUT	98	–	–	–	–	98
(United States)	Matt Bettencourt*	463	97	CUT	106	–	–	–	–	–	–	106
(Australia)	Rod Pampling	452	98	T41	86	CUT	92	–	–	–	–	92
(England)	Greg Owen*	448	99	T15	66	T61	77	–	–	–	–	77
(Sweden)	Daniel Chopra	441	100	T58	100	60	97	–	–	–	–	97
(United States)	Michael Allen	440	101	CUT	108	–	–	–	–	–	–	108
(United States)	Robert Garrigus	433	102	CUT	109	–	–	–	–	–	–	109
(Australia)	Aaron Baddeley	431	103	CUT	111	–	–	–	–	–	–	111
(United States)	James Driscoll	428	104	CUT	112	–	–	–	–	–	–	112
(United States)	Jeff Quinney	425	105	CUT	113	–	–	–	–	–	–	113
(United States)	Tim Herron	421	106	CUT	114	–	–	–	–	–	–	114
(Sweden)	Freddie Jacobson	418	107	T6	48	T69	56	T30	57	–	–	57
(Sweden)	Richard S. Johnson	417	108	T31	85	72	91	–	–	–	–	91
(United States)	Bill Lunde*	414	109	T64	107	–	–	–	–	–	–	107
(Germany)	Alex Čejka	412	110	T73	116	–	–	–	–	–	–	116
(United States)	Mark Calcavecchia	411	111	CUT	117	–	–	–	–	–	–	117
(United States)	Harrison Frazar	400	112	T52	104	–	–	–	–	–	–	104
(United States)	Chris DiMarco	391	113	CUT	118	–	–	–	–	–	–	118
(United States)	Steve Flesch	389	114	CUT	119	–	–	–	–	–	–	119
(United States)	Vaughn Taylor	386	115	T64	115	–	–	–	–	–	–	115
(Australia)	Adam Scott	379	116	T58	110	–	–	–	–	–	–	110
(United States)	Chris Stroud*	379	117	CUT	120	–	–	–	–	–	–	120
(United States)	David Mathis*	377	118	CUT	122	–	–	–	–	–	–	122
(United States)	Chris Riley*	377	119	T46	103	–	–	–	–	–	–	103
(United States)	Joe Ogilvie	373	120	76	121	–	–	–	–	–	–	121
(United States)	Todd Hamilton*	365	121	77	123	–	–	–	–	–	–	123
(United States)	Roland Thatcher	364	122	CUT	124	–	–	–	–	–	–	124
(United States)	Jeff Maggert	363	123	CUT	125	–	–	–	–	–	–	125
(United States)	Heath Slocum	355	124	1	3	CUT	3	T38	5	1,600	T19	8
(United States)	Troy Matteson	354	125	T20	83	T36	78	–	–	–	–	78

* First-time Playoffs participant
