= 2005 PGA Tour =

Golf tour season

2005 PGA Tour season
- Duration: January 6, 2005 – November 6, 2005
- Number of official events: 48
- Most wins: (United States) Tiger Woods (6)
- Money winner: (United States) Tiger Woods
- PGA Tour Player of the Year: (United States) Tiger Woods
- PGA Player of the Year: (United States) Tiger Woods
- Rookie of the Year: (United States) Sean O'Hair

The 2005 PGA Tour was the 90th season of the PGA Tour, the main professional golf tour in the United States. It was also the 37th season since separating from the PGA of America.

== Schedule ==
The following table lists official events during the 2005 season.

Date	Tournament	Location	Purse (US$)	Winner (Note: The number in parentheses after each winner's name is the number of PGA Tour events they had won up to and including that tournament. This information is only shown for PGA Tour members.)	OWGR points	Notes
Jan 9	Mercedes Championships	Hawaii	5,300,000	(Australia) Stuart Appleby (6)	54	Winners-only event
Jan 16	Sony Open in Hawaii	Hawaii	4,800,000	(Fiji) Vijay Singh (25)	60	
Jan 23	Buick Invitational	California	4,800,000	(United States) Tiger Woods (41)	58	
Jan 30	Bob Hope Chrysler Classic	California	4,700,000	(United States) Justin Leonard (9)	54	Pro-Am
Feb 6	FBR Open	Arizona	5,200,000	(United States) Phil Mickelson (24)	60	
Feb 13	AT&T Pebble Beach National Pro-Am	California	5,300,000	(United States) Phil Mickelson (25)	52	Pro-Am
Feb 20	Nissan Open	California	4,800,000	(Australia) Adam Scott (n/a)	48	Unofficial win (Note: Shortened to 36 holes due to rain. Due to the event's length, this win is not officially recognized as a PGA Tour victory.)
Feb 27	WGC-Accenture Match Play Championship	California	7,500,000	(United States) David Toms (11)	76	World Golf Championship
Feb 27	Chrysler Classic of Tucson	Arizona	3,000,000	(Australia) Geoff Ogilvy (1)	24	Alternate event
Mar 6	Ford Championship at Doral	Florida	5,500,000	(United States) Tiger Woods (42)	66	
Mar 13	The Honda Classic	Florida	5,500,000	(Republic of Ireland) Pádraig Harrington (1)	50	
Mar 20	Bay Hill Invitational	Florida	5,000,000	(United States) Kenny Perry (8)	70	Invitational
Mar 28	The Players Championship	Florida	8,000,000	(United States) Fred Funk (7)	80	Flagship event
Apr 3	BellSouth Classic	Georgia	5,000,000	(United States) Phil Mickelson (26)	42	
Apr 10	Masters Tournament	Georgia	7,000,000	(United States) Tiger Woods (43)	100	Major championship
Apr 17	MCI Heritage	South Carolina	5,200,000	(Australia) Peter Lonard (1)	52	Invitational
Apr 24	Shell Houston Open	Texas	5,000,000	(Fiji) Vijay Singh (26)	46	
May 1	Zurich Classic of New Orleans	Louisiana	5,500,000	(United States) Tim Petrovic (1)	48	
May 8	Wachovia Championship	North Carolina	6,000,000	(Fiji) Vijay Singh (27)	68	
May 15	EDS Byron Nelson Championship	Texas	6,200,000	(United States) Ted Purdy (1)	66	
May 22	Bank of America Colonial	Texas	5,600,000	(United States) Kenny Perry (8)	58	Invitational
May 29	FedEx St. Jude Classic	Tennessee	4,900,000	(United States) Justin Leonard (10)	38	
Jun 5	Memorial Tournament	Ohio	5,500,000	(United States) Bart Bryant (2)	70	Invitational
Jun 12	Booz Allen Classic	Maryland	5,000,000	(Spain) Sergio García (6)	68	
Jun 19	U.S. Open	North Carolina	6,250,000	(New Zealand) Michael Campbell (1)	100	Major championship
Jun 26	Barclays Classic	New York	5,750,000	(Republic of Ireland) Pádraig Harrington (2)	50	
Jul 3	Cialis Western Open	Illinois	5,000,000	(United States) Jim Furyk (10)	54	
Jul 10	John Deere Classic	Illinois	4,000,000	(United States) Sean O'Hair (1)	30	
Jul 17	The Open Championship	Scotland	£4,000,000	(United States) Tiger Woods (44)	100	Major championship
Jul 17	B.C. Open	New York	3,000,000	(United States) Jason Bohn (1)	24	Alternate event
Jul 24	U.S. Bank Championship in Milwaukee	Wisconsin	3,800,000	(United States) Ben Crane (2)	30	
Jul 31	Buick Open	Michigan	4,600,000	(Fiji) Vijay Singh (28)	46	
Aug 7	The International	Colorado	5,000,000	(South Africa) Retief Goosen (6)	54	
Aug 15	PGA Championship	New Jersey	6,500,000	(United States) Phil Mickelson (27)	100	Major championship
Aug 21	WGC-NEC Invitational	Ohio	7,500,000	(United States) Tiger Woods (45)	74	World Golf Championship
Aug 21	Reno–Tahoe Open	Nevada	3,000,000	(United States) Vaughn Taylor (2)	24	Alternate event
Aug 28	Buick Championship	Connecticut	4,300,000	(United States) Brad Faxon (8)	36	
Sep 5	Deutsche Bank Championship	Massachusetts	5,500,000	(United States) Olin Browne (3)	44	
Sep 11	Bell Canadian Open	Canada	5,000,000	(United States) Mark Calcavecchia (12)	44	
Sep 18	84 Lumber Classic	Pennsylvania	4,400,000	(United States) Jason Gore (1)	54	
Sep 25	Valero Texas Open	Texas	3,500,000	(United States) Robert Gamez (3)	30	Alternate event
Oct 2	Chrysler Classic of Greensboro	North Carolina	5,000,000	(South Korea) K. J. Choi (3)	44	
Oct 9	WGC-American Express Championship	California	7,500,000	(United States) Tiger Woods (46)	72	World Golf Championship
Oct 16	Michelin Championship at Las Vegas	Nevada	4,000,000	(United States) Wes Short Jr. (1)	52	
Oct 23	Funai Classic at the Walt Disney World Resort	Florida	4,400,000	(United States) Lucas Glover (1)	52	
Oct 30	Chrysler Championship	Florida	5,300,000	(Sweden) Carl Pettersson (1)	58	
Nov 6	The Tour Championship	Georgia	6,500,000	(United States) Bart Bryant (3)	56	Tour Championship
Nov 6; ~~Oct 9~~	Southern Farm Bureau Classic	Mississippi	3,000,000	(United States) Heath Slocum (2)	24	Alternate event

=== Unofficial events ===
The following events were sanctioned by the PGA Tour, but did not carry official money, nor were wins official.

Date	Tournament	Location	Purse ($)	Winner(s)	Notes
Mar 29	Tavistock Cup	Florida	2,000,000	Tie	Team event
Jun 28	CVS Charity Classic	Rhode Island	1,350,000	(United States) Chris DiMarco and (United States) Fred Funk	Team event
Sep 25	Presidents Cup	Virginia	n/a	Team USA	Team event
Nov 8	Tommy Bahama Challenge	Arizona	700,000	Team International	Team event
Nov 13	Franklin Templeton Shootout	Florida	2,600,000	(United States) John Huston and (United States) Kenny Perry	Team event
Nov 15	Wendy's 3-Tour Challenge	Nevada	900,000	Champions Tour	Team event
Nov 20	WGC-World Cup	Portugal	4,000,000	(Wales) Stephen Dodd and (Wales) Bradley Dredge	World Golf Championship; Team event
Nov 23	PGA Grand Slam of Golf	Hawaii	1,000,000	(United States) Tiger Woods	Limited-field event
Nov 27	Merrill Lynch Skins Game	California	1,000,000	(United States) Fred Funk	Limited-field event
Dec 11	Target World Challenge	California	5,500,000	(England) Luke Donald	Limited-field event

== Location of tournaments ==
Location of official tournaments of the 2005 PGA Tour in the continental United States and Canada.
Players & Majors
World Golf Championships
Regular events
Alternate events
Tour Championship
Location of official tournaments of the 2005 PGA Tour outside the continental United States and Canada.
Players & Majors
World Golf Championships
Regular events

== Money list ==
The money list was based on prize money won during the season, calculated in U.S. dollars.

Position	Player	Prize money ($)
1	(United States) Tiger Woods	10,628,024
2	(Fiji) Vijay Singh	8,017,336
3	(United States) Phil Mickelson	5,699,605
4	(United States) Jim Furyk	4,255,369
5	(United States) David Toms	3,962,013
6	(United States) Kenny Perry	3,607,155
7	(United States) Chris DiMarco	3,562,548
8	(South Africa) Retief Goosen	3,494,106
9	(United States) Bart Bryant	3,249,136
10	(Spain) Sergio García	3,213,375

== Awards ==
Award	Winner	Ref.
PGA Tour Player of the Year (Jack Nicklaus Trophy)	(United States) Tiger Woods	
PGA Player of the Year	(United States) Tiger Woods	
Rookie of the Year	(United States) Sean O'Hair	
Scoring leader (PGA Tour – Byron Nelson Award)	(United States) Tiger Woods	
Scoring leader (PGA – Vardon Trophy)	(United States) Tiger Woods	
Comeback Player of the Year	(United States) Olin Browne	

== See also ==
- 2005 in golf
- 2005 Champions Tour
- 2005 Nationwide Tour
