= 2004 PGA Tour =

Golf tour season

2004 PGA Tour season
- Duration: January 8, 2004 – November 7, 2004
- Number of official events: 48
- Most wins: (Fiji) Vijay Singh (9)
- Money list: (Fiji) Vijay Singh
- PGA Tour Player of the Year: (Fiji) Vijay Singh
- PGA Player of the Year: (Fiji) Vijay Singh
- Rookie of the Year: (United States) Todd Hamilton

The 2004 PGA Tour was the 89th season of the PGA Tour, the main professional golf tour in the United States. It was also the 36th season since separating from the PGA of America.

== Schedule ==
The following table lists official events during the 2004 season.

Date	Tournament	Location	Purse (US$)	Winner (Note: The number in parentheses after each winner's name is the number of PGA Tour events they had won up to and including that tournament. This information is only shown for PGA Tour members.)	OWGR points	Notes
Jan 11	Mercedes Championships	Hawaii	5,300,000	(Australia) Stuart Appleby (5)	58	Winners-only event
Jan 18	Sony Open in Hawaii	Hawaii	4,800,000	(South Africa) Ernie Els (13)	56	
Jan 25	Bob Hope Chrysler Classic	California	4,500,000	(United States) Phil Mickelson (22)	54	Pro-Am
Feb 1	FBR Open	Arizona	5,200,000	(United States) Jonathan Kaye (2)	62	
Feb 8	AT&T Pebble Beach National Pro-Am	California	5,300,000	(Fiji) Vijay Singh (16)	48	Pro-Am
Feb 15	Buick Invitational	California	4,800,000	(United States) John Daly (5)	58	
Feb 22	Nissan Open	California	4,800,000	(Canada) Mike Weir (7)	66	
Feb 29	WGC-Accenture Match Play Championship	California	7,000,000	(United States) Tiger Woods (40)	74	World Golf Championship
Feb 29	Chrysler Classic of Tucson	Arizona	3,000,000	(United States) Heath Slocum (1)	24	Alternate event
Mar 7	Ford Championship at Doral	Florida	5,000,000	(Australia) Craig Parry (2)	52	
Mar 14	The Honda Classic	Florida	5,000,000	(United States) Todd Hamilton (1)	48	
Mar 21	Bay Hill Invitational	Florida	5,000,000	(United States) Chad Campbell (2)	68	Invitational
Mar 28	The Players Championship	Florida	8,000,000	(Australia) Adam Scott (2)	80	Flagship event
Apr 4	BellSouth Classic	Georgia	4,500,000	(United States) Zach Johnson (1)	44	
Apr 11	Masters Tournament	Georgia	6,000,000	(United States) Phil Mickelson (23)	100	Major championship
Apr 18	MCI Heritage	South Carolina	4,800,000	(United States) Stewart Cink (3)	56	Invitational
Apr 26	Shell Houston Open	Texas	5,000,000	(Fiji) Vijay Singh (17)	44	
May 3	HP Classic of New Orleans	Louisiana	5,100,000	(Fiji) Vijay Singh (18)	48	
May 9	Wachovia Championship	North Carolina	5,600,000	(United States) Joey Sindelar (7)	66	
May 16	EDS Byron Nelson Championship	Texas	5,800,000	(Spain) Sergio García (4)	64	
May 23	Bank of America Colonial	Texas	5,300,000	(United States) Steve Flesch (2)	60	Invitational
May 30	FedEx St. Jude Classic	Tennessee	4,700,000	(United States) David Toms (10)	26	
Jun 6	Memorial Tournament	Ohio	5,250,000	(South Africa) Ernie Els (14)	70	Invitational
Jun 13	Buick Classic	New York	5,250,000	(Spain) Sergio García (5)	68	
Jun 20	U.S. Open	New York	6,250,000	(South Africa) Retief Goosen (4)	100	Major championship
Jun 27	Booz Allen Classic	Maryland	4,800,000	(Australia) Adam Scott (3)	30	
Jul 4	Cialis Western Open	Illinois	4,800,000	(Trinidad and Tobago) Stephen Ames (1)	56	
Jul 11	John Deere Classic	Illinois	3,800,000	(Australia) Mark Hensby (1)	36	
Jul 18	The Open Championship	Scotland	£4,000,000	(United States) Todd Hamilton (2)	100	Major championship
Jul 18	B.C. Open	New York	3,000,000	(United States) Jonathan Byrd (2)	24	Alternate event
Jul 25	U.S. Bank Championship in Milwaukee	Wisconsin	3,500,000	(Paraguay) Carlos Franco (4)	26	
Aug 1	Buick Open	Michigan	4,500,000	(Fiji) Vijay Singh (19)	50	
Aug 8	The International	Colorado	5,000,000	(Australia) Rod Pampling (1)	54	
Aug 15	PGA Championship	Wisconsin	6,250,000	(Fiji) Vijay Singh (20)	100	Major championship
Aug 22	WGC-NEC Invitational	Ohio	7,000,000	(United States) Stewart Cink (4)	76	World Golf Championship
Aug 22	Reno–Tahoe Open	Nevada	3,000,000	(United States) Vaughn Taylor (1)	24	Alternate event
Aug 29	Buick Championship	Connecticut	4,200,000	(United States) Woody Austin (2)	24	
Sep 6	Deutsche Bank Championship	Massachusetts	5,000,000	(Fiji) Vijay Singh (21)	48	
Sep 12	Bell Canadian Open	Ontario	4,500,000	(Fiji) Vijay Singh (22)	50	
Sep 19	Valero Texas Open	Texas	3,500,000	(United States) Bart Bryant (1)	24	Alternate event
Sep 26	84 Lumber Classic	Pennsylvania	4,200,000	(Fiji) Vijay Singh (23)	54	
Oct 3	WGC-American Express Championship	Ireland	7,000,000	(South Africa) Ernie Els (15)	70	World Golf Championship
Oct 3	Southern Farm Bureau Classic	Mississippi	3,000,000	(United States) Fred Funk (6)	24	Alternate event
Oct 10	Michelin Championship at Las Vegas	Nevada	4,000,000	(Australia) Andre Stolz (1)	42	
Oct 17	Chrysler Classic of Greensboro	North Carolina	4,600,000	(United States) Brent Geiberger (2)	44	
Oct 24	Funai Classic at the Walt Disney World Resort	Florida	4,200,000	(United States) Ryan Palmer (1)	54	
Oct 31	Chrysler Championship	Florida	5,000,000	(Fiji) Vijay Singh (24)	62	
Nov 7	The Tour Championship	Georgia	6,000,000	(South Africa) Retief Goosen (5)	66	Tour Championship

=== Unofficial events ===
The following events were sanctioned by the PGA Tour, but did not carry official money, nor were wins official.

Date	Tournament	Location	Purse ($)	Winner(s)	Notes
Mar 30	Tavistock Cup	Florida	1,730,000	Team Isleworth	Team event
Jun 29	CVS Charity Classic	Rhode Island	1,300,000	(United States) Bill Haas and (United States) Jay Haas	Team event
Sep 19	Ryder Cup	Michigan	n/a	Team Europe	Team event
Nov 8	Tommy Bahama Challenge	Arizona	700,000	Team USA	Team event
Nov 9	Wendy's 3-Tour Challenge	Nevada	900,000	LPGA Tour	Team event
Nov 14	Franklin Templeton Shootout	Florida	2,500,000	(United States) Hank Kuehne and (United States) Jeff Sluman	Team event
Nov 21	WGC-World Cup	Spain	4,000,000	(England) Paul Casey and (England) Luke Donald	World Golf Championship; Team event
Nov 21	UBS Cup	South Carolina	3,000,000	Team USA	Team event
Nov 24	PGA Grand Slam of Golf	Hawaii	1,000,000	(United States) Phil Mickelson	Limited-field event
Nov 28	Merrill Lynch Skins Game	California	1,000,000	(United States) Fred Couples	Limited-field event
Nov 28	Shinhan Korea Golf Championship	South Korea	3,550,000	(United States) Arron Oberholser	
Dec 12	Target World Challenge	California	5,250,000	(United States) Tiger Woods	Limited-field event

== Location of tournaments ==
Location of official tournaments of the 2004 PGA Tour in the continental United States and Canada.
Players & Majors
World Golf Championships
Regular events
Alternate events
Tour Championship
Location of official tournaments of the 2004 PGA Tour outside the continental United States and Canada.
Players & Majors
World Golf Championships
Regular events

== Money list ==
The money list was based on prize money won during the season, calculated in U.S. dollars.

Position	Player	Prize money ($)
1	(Fiji) Vijay Singh	10,905,166
2	(South Africa) Ernie Els	5,787,225
3	(United States) Phil Mickelson	5,784,823
4	(United States) Tiger Woods	5,365,472
5	(United States) Stewart Cink	4,450,270
6	(South Africa) Retief Goosen	3,885,573
7	(Australia) Adam Scott	3,724,984
8	(Trinidad and Tobago) Stephen Ames	3,303,205
9	(Spain) Sergio García	3,239,215
10	(United States) Davis Love III	3,075,092

== Awards ==
Award	Winner	Ref.
PGA Tour Player of the Year (Jack Nicklaus Trophy)	(Fiji) Vijay Singh	
PGA Player of the Year	(Fiji) Vijay Singh	
Rookie of the Year	(United States) Todd Hamilton	
Scoring leader (PGA Tour – Byron Nelson Award)	(Fiji) Vijay Singh	
Scoring leader (PGA – Vardon Trophy)	(Fiji) Vijay Singh	
Comeback Player of the Year	(United States) John Daly	

== See also ==
- 2004 in golf
- 2004 Champions Tour
- 2004 Nationwide Tour
