= Heath Slocum =

American professional golfer (born 1974)

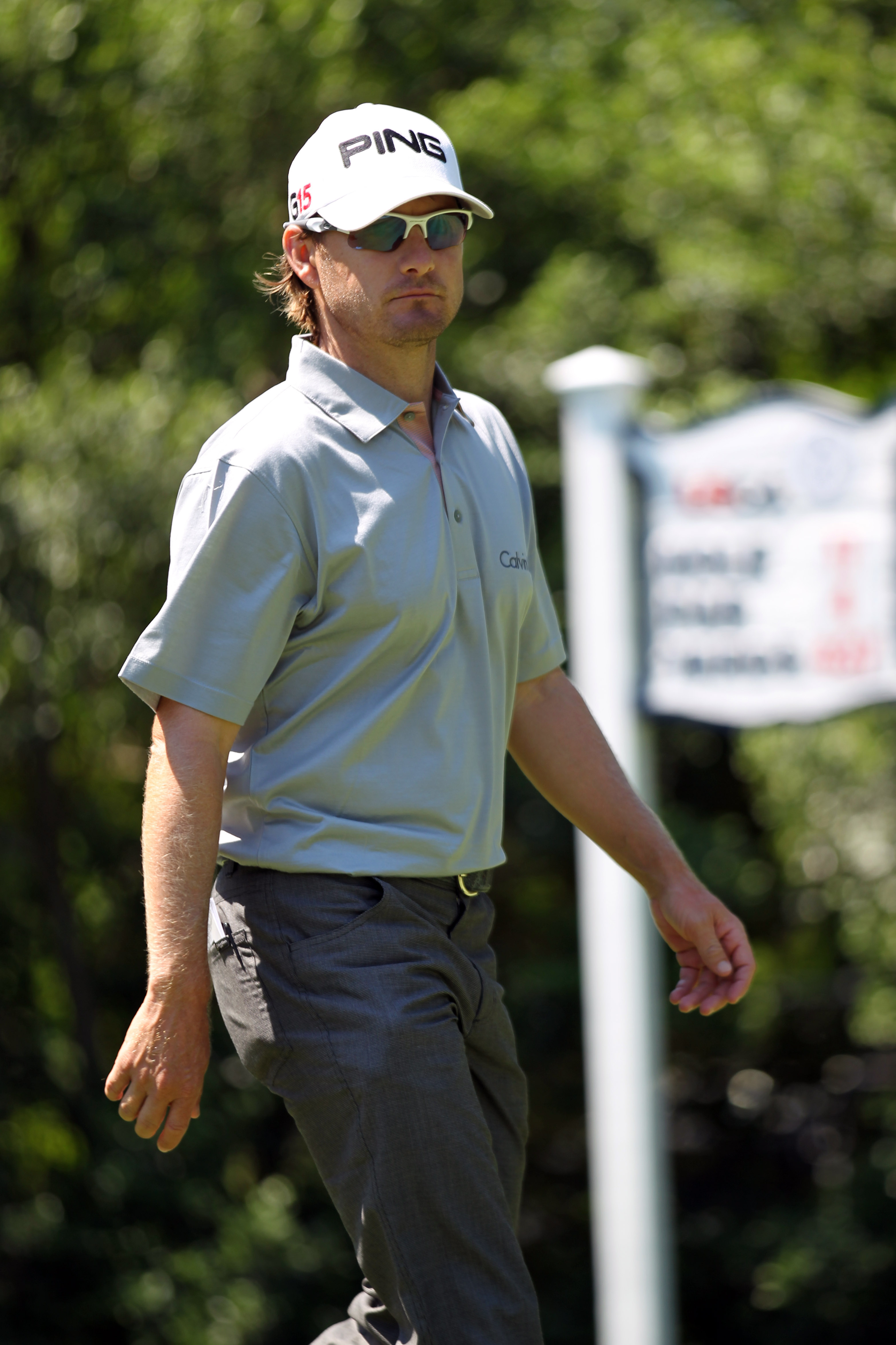

Personal information
- Full name: Tyler Heath Slocum
- Nationality: United States
- Born: February 3, 1974 (age 52) Baton Rouge, Louisiana, U.S.
- Height: 5 ft 8 in (1.73 m)
- Weight: 150 lb (68 kg; 11 st)

Career
- Sport: Golf
- College: University of South Alabama
- Turned professional: 1996
- Current tour: PGA Tour Champions
- Former tour: PGA Tour
- Professional wins: 7
- Highest ranking: 52 (October 10, 2010)

Number of wins by tour
- PGA Tour: 4
- Korn Ferry Tour: 3

Best results in major championships
- Masters Tournament: T18: 2010
- PGA Championship: 22nd: 2002
- U.S. Open: T9: 2008
- The Open Championship: T32: 2008

Tyler Heath Slocum (born February 3, 1974) is an American professional golfer who played on the PGA Tour and the PGA Tour Champions.

== Early life ==
Slocum was born in Baton Rouge, Louisiana. He attended St. Anthony of Padua Catholic School in Bunkie, Louisiana from 1986 (6th grade) until 1987 (8th grade). Slocum learned the game of golf from his father, Jack. He played on the same Milton High School golf team in Milton, Florida as fellow PGA Tour player Boo Weekley.

== Amateur career ==
Slocum later attended the University of South Alabama in Mobile, Alabama. While a student there, he earned many amateur golf honors including three-time All-American.

== Professional career ==
In 1996, Slocum turned professional. He began his career on the Nike Tour. In November 1997, Slocum developed ulcerative colitis which caused his weight to drop from 150 pounds to 122 pounds, and left him unable to play for a year and a half. The Crohn's & Colitis Foundation of America named Slocum a national spokesperson, to help raise awareness of ulcerative colitis and Crohn's disease, another inflammatory bowel disease.

After he recovered, Slocum regained his playing privileges on the Web.com Tour in 2000. In 2001, he became the second player to earn a "battlefield promotion" to the PGA Tour by winning three Web.com Tour events in the same season. He was also only the second player in Web.com Tour history to complete 72 holes without a bogey. Slocum would later call this the best stretch of golf in his life.

Slocum joined the PGA Tour in 2001, and has four wins in his career. His first win was in 2004 at the Chrysler Classic of Tucson. His second win came at the Southern Farm Bureau Classic in 2005. His best finish in a major is a tie for 9th at the 2008 U.S. Open and he has featured in the top 100 of the Official World Golf Ranking.

Slocum represented the United States at the 2007 World Cup, partnered with Boo Weekley. The Americans finished second after losing a sudden-death playoff to Scotland.

Slocum barely qualified for the 2009 FedEx Cup Playoffs; he finished 124th on the regular season points list, just ahead of Troy Matteson, the 125th and final entrant. At the first playoff event, The Barclays at Liberty National Golf Club in New Jersey, he won the event by one stroke, holing a 21-foot putt for par on the last hole to deny Ernie Els, Pádraig Harrington, Steve Stricker, and Tiger Woods the chance of victory. Slocum's win, his third on the Tour, vaulted him 121 spots on the FedEx Cup points list, to 3rd; it also earned him $1,350,000, more than double his prior winnings in 2009. He ended up placing 8th in the FedEx Cup standings that year.

In 2010, Slocum enjoyed a solid year. During the main portion of the season, he recorded four top-ten finishes, including a tie for 4th at The Players Championship. He ended up 46th in the FedEx Cup. Then he capped off his year in style during the Fall Series, winning the inaugural McGladrey Classic. Slocum held off Bill Haas by one stroke to earn the fourth title of his PGA Tour career.

Slocum did not record any top-10 finishes on the PGA Tour in 2011. However, he finished 12th at the Arnold Palmer Invitational, 11th at the U.S. Open, 15th at the McGladrey Classic and 20th at the Children's Miracle Network Hospitals Classic, so he retained his card. In 2012 he had only three top-25 finishes and lost his PGA Tour card. Slocum returned to the PGA Tour Qualifying Tournament but came up just short of reclaiming a Tour card.

In 2013, Slocum split time between the Web.com Tour and PGA Tour, performing poorly on both. He barely qualified for the 2013 Web.com Tour Finals, where he finished 8th at the Chiquita Classic and 17th at the Nationwide Children's Hospital Championship and Web.com Tour Championship, regaining a PGA Tour card for 2014. That season, he had a best result of fourth at the Wyndham Championship but only collected three top-25s, forcing him to return to the Web.com Tour Finals. Once again, though, Slocum saved his PGA Tour card, thanks to a tie for fourth at the Web.com Tour Championship. Slocum last played a full PGA Tour schedule in 2015, making six cuts in 22 events.

Between 2016 and 2022, Slocum participated in a total of 22 PGA Tour events, making the cut just three times. In 2022 and 2023, Slocum was also active on the Korn Ferry Tour, playing 15 total events, but missed the cut in every tournament.

== Professional wins (7) ==
=== PGA Tour wins (4) ===
Legend
FedEx Cup playoff events (1)
Other PGA Tour (3)

No.	Date	Tournament	Winning score	Margin of victory	Runner(s)-up
1	Feb 29, 2004	Chrysler Classic of Tucson	−22 (67-64-70-65=266)	1 stroke	(Australia) Aaron Baddeley
2	Nov 6, 2005	Southern Farm Bureau Classic	−21 (69-68-64-66=267)	2 strokes	(Sweden) Carl Pettersson
3	Aug 30, 2009	The Barclays	−9 (66-72-70-67=275)	1 stroke	(South Africa) Ernie Els, (Republic of Ireland) Pádraig Harrington, (United States) Steve Stricker, (United States) Tiger Woods
4	Oct 10, 2010	McGladrey Classic	−14 (66-66-66-68=266)	1 stroke	(United States) Bill Haas

=== Buy.com Tour wins (3) ===
No.	Date	Tournament	Winning score	Margin of victory	Runner(s)-up
1	Jun 17, 2001	Buy.com Greater Cleveland Open	−21 (64-66-69-68=267)	1 stroke	(Japan) Ryuji Imada
2	Jul 1, 2001	Buy.com Knoxville Open	−23 (64-68-65-68=265)	6 strokes	(United States) Keoke Cotner, (United States) Joe Daley
3	Aug 5, 2001	Buy.com Omaha Classic	−22 (64-70-66-66=266)	1 stroke	(Australia) Rod Pampling

== Playoff record ==
Other playoff record (0–1)

No.	Year	Tournament	Opponents	Result
1	2007	Omega Mission Hills World Cup (with (United States) Boo Weekley)	Scotland − Colin Montgomerie and Marc Warren	Lost to par on third extra hole

== Results in major championships ==
Tournament	2002	2003	2004	2005	2006	2007	2008	2009
Masters Tournament							T33	
U.S. Open	CUT						T9	CUT
The Open Championship							T32	
PGA Championship	22		CUT	T47	T29	T23	CUT	

Tournament	2010	2011
Masters Tournament	T18	CUT
U.S. Open	CUT	T11
The Open Championship	T60	
PGA Championship	T33	CUT

Top 10
Did not play

CUT = missed the half-way cut
"T" = tied

=== Summary ===
Tournament	Wins	2nd	3rd	Top-5	Top-10	Top-25	Events	Cuts made
Masters Tournament	0	0	0	0	0	1	3	2
U.S. Open	0	0	0	0	1	2	5	2
The Open Championship	0	0	0	0	0	0	2	2
PGA Championship	0	0	0	0	0	2	8	5
Totals	0	0	0	0	1	5	18	11

- Most consecutive cuts made – 6 (2005 PGA – 2008 Open Championship)
- Longest streak of top-10s – 1

== Results in The Players Championship ==
Tournament	2003	2004	2005	2006	2007	2008	2009	2010	2011	2012
The Players Championship	CUT	T58	T53	CUT	T44	T69	T55	T4	CUT	T64

Top 10

CUT = missed the halfway cut
"T" indicates a tie for a place

== Results in World Golf Championships ==
Tournament	2008	2009	2010	2011
Match Play				R64
Championship	77		T22	
Invitational	T68		T39	58
Champions			T48	

Did not play

QF, R16, R32, R64 = Round in which player lost in match play
"T" = Tied
Note that the HSBC Champions did not become a WGC event until 2009.

== U.S. national team appearances ==
- World Cup: 2007

== See also ==
- 2001 Buy.com Tour graduates
- 2013 Web.com Tour Finals graduates
- 2014 Web.com Tour Finals graduates
- List of people diagnosed with ulcerative colitis
