= Jason Hill (golfer) =

American professional golfer (born 1971)

Personal information
- Nationality: United States
- Born: January 17, 1971 (age 55) Dallas, Texas, U.S.
- Height: 5 ft 11 in (1.80 m)
- Weight: 215 lb (98 kg; 15.4 st)

Career
- Sport: Golf
- College: Baylor University
- Turned professional: 1993
- Former tours: Nationwide Tour; PGA Tour
- Professional wins: 1

Number of wins by tour
- Korn Ferry Tour: 1

Jason Hill (born January 17, 1971) is an American professional golfer. He turned professional in 1993.

== Career ==
In 1971, Hill was born in Dallas, Texas. He played college golf at Baylor University, where he won three events including the 1992 Southwest Conference individual championship.

Hill played on the Nationwide Tour (2001, 2003–08) and PGA Tour (2002). His best finish on the Nationwide Tour was a win at the 2001 Steamtown Classic. His best finish on the PGA Tour was a T-14 at the 2002 FedEx St. Jude Classic.

== Professional wins (1) ==
=== Buy.com Tour wins (1) ===
No.	Date	Tournament	Winning score	Margin of victory	Runners-up
1	Jun 3, 2001	Buy.com Steamtown Classic	–8 (67-71-69-65=272)	3 strokes	(United States) Jonathan Byrd, (United States) Matt Peterson

== See also ==
- 2001 Buy.com Tour graduates
