= Northeast Pennsylvania Classic =

Coordinates: 41.35229°N 75.54864°W

Tournament information
- Location: Moscow, Pennsylvania
- Established: 2000
- Course: Elmhurst Country Club
- Par: 70
- Length: 6,840 yards (6,250 m)
- Tour: Nationwide Tour
- Format: Stroke play
- Prize fund: US$525,000
- Month played: August
- Final year: 2009

Tournament record score
- Aggregate: 265 Blaine McCallister (2003); 265 Gary Christian (2009); 265 Mathias Grönberg (2009)
- To par: −19 Blaine McCallister (2003)

Final champion
- (United States) Tom Gillis
- Location in the United States Location in Pennsylvania

The Northeast Pennsylvania Classic was a golf tournament on the Nationwide Tour from 2000 to 2009. It was played at the Elmhurst Country Club in Moscow, Pennsylvania from 2008 to 2009. From 2000 to 2007, it was played at the Glenmaura National Golf Club in Moosic, Pennsylvania.

The 2009 purse was $525,000 with $94,500 going to the winner.

== Winners ==
Year	Winner	Score	To par	Margin of victory	Runner(s)-up
Northeast Pennsylvania Classic
2009	(England) Gary Christian	265	−15	Playoff	(Sweden) Mathias Grönberg
2008	(United States) Scott Piercy	267	−13	2 strokes	(Zimbabwe) Brendon de Jonge (Australia) Cameron Percy
2007	(United States) Justin Bolli	270	−14	1 stroke	(Wales) Richard Johnson (United States) Patrick Sheehan
2006	(United States) Craig Bowden	268	−16	Playoff	(United States) Jess Daley
2005	(United States) Greg Kraft	267	−17	2 strokes	(United States) Timothy O'Neal
2004	(United States) D. A. Points	270	−14	Playoff	(United States) James Driscoll
2003	(United States) Blaine McCallister	265	−19	3 strokes	(United States) Bill Glasson
2002	(United States) Gary Hallberg	275	−9	3 strokes	(United States) Roger Tambellini
Buy.com Steamtown Classic
2001	(United States) Jason Hill	272	−8	3 strokes	(United States) Jonathan Byrd (United States) Matt Peterson
2000	(United States) Jeff Hart	275	−5	1 stroke	(Canada) Ian Leggatt
