= 1999 PGA Tour Qualifying School graduates =

This is a list of the 40 players who earned their 2000 PGA Tour card through Q School in 1999.

Place	Player	PGA Tour starts	Cuts made	Notes
1	(United States) Blaine McCallister	465	273	5 PGA Tour wins
T2	(United States) David Peoples	386	212	2 PGA Tour wins
T2	(United States) Neal Lancaster	313	184	1 PGA Tour win
T2	(United States) Jay Williamson	83	37	
T2	(United States) Ben Bates	68	39	1 Nike Tour win
T2	(United States) Sean Murphy	140	63	6 Nike Tour wins
T7	(United States) Jerry Smith	4	2	1 Asian Tour win
T7	(Australia) Craig Spence	8	3	1 PGA Tour of Australasia win
T7	(United States) Robin Freeman	250	119	2 Nike Tour wins
T10	(United States) Brian Gay	27	8	
T10	(United States) Michael Clark II	3	0	2 Nike Tour wins
T12	(United States) Gary Nicklaus	26	2	Son of Jack Nicklaus
T12	(United States) Bob May	39	11	1 European Tour win
T12	(United States) Steve Hart	189	62	
T12	(United States) Pete Jordan	174	81	
T16	(Canada) David Morland IV	9	2	1 Canadian Tour win
T16	(United States) John Rollins	1	0	
T16	(United States) Rick Fehr	366	227	2 PGA Tour wins
T19	(United States) Jimmy Green	64	23	1 Nike Tour win
T19	(United States) Bobby Cochran	1	0	
T19	(Republic of Ireland) Keith Nolan	25	4	
T19	(United States) Jeff Brehaut	29	12	2 Nike Tour wins
T23	(United States) David Edwards	502	335	4 PGA Tour wins, brother of Danny Edwards
T23	(United States) Joe Ogilvie	33	14	2 Nike Tour wins
T23	(United States) Cameron Beckman	26	14	
T26	(United States) Bob Burns	87	37	2 Nike Tour wins
T26	(United States) Mike Springer	259	124	2 PGA Tour wins, 4 Nike Tour wins
T26	(United States) Aaron Bengoechea	1	0	
T26	(United States) Doug Dunakey	36	15	1 Nike Tour win
T30	(United States) John Restino	0	0	
T30	(United States) Bob Friend	115	55	1 Nike Tour win, son of Bob Friend
T30	(England) Paul Curry	1	0	1 European Tour win
T30	(United States) Craig Bowden	22	8	1 Nike Tour win
T30	(United States) Jason Buha	0	0	
T35	(United States) Brett Wetterich	1	0	
T35	(United States) Bart Bryant	108	55	Brother of Brad Bryant
T35	(United States) Jason Caron	0	0	
T35	(South Korea) K. J. Choi	3	2	2 Japan Golf Tour wins, 1 Asian Tour win
T35	(New Zealand) Craig Perks	1	0	
T35	(United States) Dave Stockton Jr.	183	86	2 Nike Tour wins, son of Dave Stockton

- Players in yellow were 2000 PGA Tour rookies.

== 2000 Results ==
Player	Starts	Cuts made	Best finish	Money list rank	Earnings ($)
(United States) Blaine McCallister	30	21	2	49	963,974
(United States) David Peoples	28	21	T7	110	459,812
(United States) Neal Lancaster	31	19	T4	105	466,712
(United States) Jay Williamson	32	20	T7	109	460,024
(United States) Ben Bates	35	18	T9	149	248,087
(United States) Sean Murphy	35	15	T5	130	339,242
(United States) Jerry Smith*	32	20	9	118	406,591
(Australia) Craig Spence*	31	12	5	129	346,569
(United States) Robin Freeman	32	17	3	115	415,430
(United States) Brian Gay	33	17	T4	102	482,028
(United States) Michael Clark II*	28	13	Win	56	854,822
(United States) Gary Nicklaus*	30	11	2	119	403,982
(United States) Bob May	26	21	2/T2 (twice)	29	1,557,720
(United States) Steve Hart	30	7	T13	190	107,949
(United States) Pete Jordan	31	19	T4 (twice)	107	464,480
(Canada) David Morland IV*	31	12	T10	156	218,648
(United States) John Rollins*	27	8	T9	171	169,570
(United States) Rick Fehr	24	12	T5	132	313,701
(United States) Jimmy Green	27	16	T4	116	414,509
(United States) Bobby Cochran*	30	9	T13	185	127,342
(Republic of Ireland) Keith Nolan	23	5	T20	215	46,006
(United States) Jeff Brehaut	1	0	n/a	n/a	n/a
(United States) David Edwards	15	4	T35	218	44,194
(United States) Joe Ogilvie	30	17	T4	92	519,740
(United States) Cameron Beckman	26	14	T14 (twice)	139	291,515
(United States) Bob Burns	29	16	T6	125	391,075
(United States) Mike Springer	31	13	T22	168	182,726
(United States) Aaron Bengoechea*	29	8	T36	208	60,429
(United States) Doug Dunakey	27	14	T4	124	393,059
(United States) John Restino*	18	5	T53	222	34,242
(United States) Bob Friend	32	15	T21	162	202,973
(England) Paul Curry*	25	7	T12	183	128,701
(United States) Craig Bowden	25	4	T33	221	34,280
(United States) Jason Buha*	29	12	T18	175	153,862
(United States) Brett Wetterich*	9	1	T63	242	7,174
(United States) Bart Bryant	25	11	T37	201	85,797
(United States) Jason Caron*	29	10	T19	200	87,110
(South Korea) K. J. Choi*	30	16	T8	134	305,745
(New Zealand) Craig Perks*	28	12	T4	136	297,912
(United States) Dave Stockton Jr.	31	12	T5	140	290,426

*PGA Tour rookie in 2000
T = Tied
Green background indicates the player retained his PGA Tour card for 2001 (finished inside the top 125).
Yellow background indicates the player did not retain his PGA Tour card for 2001, but retained conditional status (finished between 126-150).
Red background indicates the player did not retain his PGA Tour card for 2001 (finished outside the top 150).

== Winners on the PGA Tour in 2000 ==
No.	Date	Player	Tournament	Winning score	Margin of victory	Runner-up
1	Jul 31	(United States) Michael Clark II	John Deere Classic	−19 (70-65-63-67=265)	Playoff	(United States) Kirk Triplett

== Runners-up on the PGA Tour in 2000 ==
No.	Date	Player	Tournament	Winner	Winning score	Runner-up score
1	Apr 2	(United States) Gary Nicklaus lost in two-man playoff	BellSouth Classic	(United States) Phil Mickelson	−11 (67-69-69=205)	−11 (68-69-68=205)
2	May 7	(United States) Blaine McCallister lost in two-man playoff	Compaq Classic of New Orleans	(Paraguay) Carlos Franco	−18 (67-67-68-68=270)	−18 (69-65-68-68=270)
3	Jun 25	(United States) Bob May	FedEx St. Jude Classic	(United States) Notah Begay III	−13 (66-69-67-69=271)	−12 (66-66-69-71=272)
4	Aug 20	(United States) Bob May lost in two-man playoff	PGA Championship	(United States) Tiger Woods	−18 (66-67-70-67=270)	−18 (72-66-66-66=270)

== See also ==
- 1999 Nike Tour graduates
