= 2001 Buy.com Tour graduates =

This is a list of players who graduated from the Buy.com Tour in 2001. The top 15 players on the Buy.com Tour's money list in 2001 earned their PGA Tour card for 2002.

	2001 Buy.com Tour		2002 PGA Tour				
Player	Money list rank	Earnings ($)	Starts	Cuts made	Best finish	Money list rank	Earnings ($)
(United States) Chad Campbell*#	1	394,552	34	21	T3	81	825,474
(United States) Pat Bates#	2	352,261	29	17	T6	123	537,284
(United States) Heath Slocum*#	3	339,670	32	15	2	76	864,615
(Australia) Rod Pampling*	4	271,169	29	19	T4	89	776,903
(South Africa) Deane Pappas	5	245,265	34	11	2	129	494,404
(United States) John Rollins	6	242,841	34	27	Win	25	1,956,565
(United States) Tim Petrovic*	7	239,010	31	15	2	86	797,206
(United States) Jonathan Byrd*	8	222,244	32	15	Win	39	1,462,713
(United States) Jeff Gove	9	198,812	30	14	T10	162	271,652
(South Africa) Brenden Pappas*	10	188,152	25	6	T27	206	83,519
(United States) Bo Van Pelt	11	175,947	28	10	T25	191	139,357
(United States) Matt Peterson*	12	169,947	27	13	T10	164	266,543
(Canada) Richard Zokol	13	167,192	20	6	T38	215	53,437
(United States) Jason Hill*	14	166,899	24	6	T14 (twice)	188	150,860
(New Zealand) Michael Long*	15	161,665	27	9	T15	183	157,723

*PGA Tour rookie for 2002.
#Campbell, Bates and Slocum received battlefield promotions to the PGA Tour in 2001 by winning three tournaments on the Buy.com Tour in 2001, becoming only the second, third and fourth players to do so. On the 2001 PGA Tour, their respective results were:

- Campbell - played three tournaments, with two missed cuts and a solo second at the Southern Farm Bureau Classic.
- Bates - played no tournaments.
- Slocum - played eight tournaments, making six cuts with a best finish of T-37 at the Southern Farm Bureau Classic.

T = Tied
Green background indicates the player retained his PGA Tour card for 2003 (finished inside the top 125).
Yellow background indicates player did not retain his PGA Tour card for 2003, but retained conditional status (finished between 126 and 150).
Red background indicates the player did not retain his PGA Tour card for 2003 (finished outside the top 150).

== Winners on the PGA Tour in 2002 ==
No.	Date	Player	Tournament	Winning score	Margin of victory	Runner(s)-up
1	Sep 8	(United States) John Rollins	Bell Canadian Open	−16 (70-71-66-65=272)	Playoff	(United States) Neal Lancaster, (United States) Justin Leonard
2	Oct 27	(United States) Jonathan Byrd	Buick Challenge	−27 (67-66-65-63=261)	1 stroke	(United States) David Toms

== Runners-up on the PGA Tour in 2002 ==
No.	Date	Player	Tournament	Winner	Winning score	Runner-up score
1	Apr 21	(United States) Heath Slocum	WorldCom Classic - The Heritage of Golf	(United States) Justin Leonard	−14 (67-64-66-73=270)	−13 (67-68-66-70=271)
2	Jun 30	(United States) Tim Petrovic	FedEx St. Jude Classic	(United States) Len Mattiace	−18 (69-68-65-64=266)	−17 (65-68-66-68=267)
3	Nov 4	(South Africa) Deane Pappas	Southern Farm Bureau Classic	(England) Luke Donald	−15 (66-68-67=201)	−14 (66-68-68=202)

== See also ==
- 2001 PGA Tour Qualifying School graduates
