= Gary Hallberg =

American professional golfer (born 1958)

Personal information
- Full name: Gary George Hallberg
- Nationality: United States
- Born: May 31, 1958 (age 68) Berwyn, Illinois, U.S.
- Height: 5 ft 10 in (1.78 m)
- Weight: 162 lb (73 kg; 11.6 st)

Career
- Sport: Golf
- College: Wake Forest University
- Turned professional: 1980
- Former tours: PGA Tour; Champions Tour
- Professional wins: 12

Number of wins by tour
- PGA Tour: 3
- Japan Golf Tour: 1
- Korn Ferry Tour: 1
- PGA Tour Champions: 1
- Other: 6

Best results in major championships
- Masters Tournament: T6: 1985
- PGA Championship: T6: 1984
- U.S. Open: T22: 1980
- The Open Championship: T32: 1991

Achievements and awards
- PGA Tour Rookie of the Year: 1980

Gary George Hallberg (born May 31, 1958) is an American professional golfer who has played on the PGA Tour, Nationwide Tour, and Champions Tour.

== Amateur career ==
Hallberg was born in Berwyn, Illinois. He attended Wake Forest University in Winston-Salem, North Carolina and was a member of the golf team. He was a member of the 1977 Walker Cup team. In addition, Hallberg was the individual medalist at the 1979 NCAA Division I Men's Golf Championships. There were expectations that he would turn pro at this time. However, Hallberg asserted that he intended to return to Wake Forest for his senior year. Hallberg was the first four-time, first-team All-American in the history of intercollegiate golf. As of May 1979, Hallberg intended to try to qualify for the PGA Tour at Fall 1980 PGA Tour Qualifying School.

== Professional career ==
Hallberg was able to circumvent the PGA Tour Qualifying Tournament, however. He was the first player to obtain his PGA Tour card by winning a set level of money (in this case $8,000 in 1980) rather than by going to q-school.

Hallberg won three PGA Tour events during his career. He was PGA Tour Rookie of the Year in 1980. His best finish in major championships was a T-6 at both the 1984 PGA Championship and The Masters in 1985. At the 1991 Open Championship, Hallberg was tied for the lead after 36 holes before finishing T32. During his late forties, he played mostly on the Nationwide Tour, winning once.

Hallberg began playing on the Champions Tour in 2008 after turning 50. He won his first title in 2010 at the Ensure Classic at Rock Barn. He shot a final round of 11-under par 61 in the final round to come from behind and win by one over Fred Couples and by two over Bernhard Langer. The win made him the fourth player to win on all the PGA Tour sponsored tours (PGA Tour, Nationwide Tour, and Champions Tour).

Hallberg has also done some analyst work for CNBC and NBC Sports. He lives in Castle Rock, Colorado. Gary's son Eric is also a professional golfer who qualified for the PGA Tour's 2015 Frys.com Open, and has also qualified to play on the Korn Ferry Tour, PGA Tour Latinoamérica and PGA Tour Canada.

== Amateur wins ==
- 1976 Western Junior
- 1978 North and South Amateur
- 1979 North and South Amateur, NCAA Division I Championship

== Professional wins (12) ==
=== PGA Tour wins (3) ===
No.	Date	Tournament	Winning score	Margin of victory	Runner(s)-up
1	Feb 20, 1983	Isuzu-Andy Williams San Diego Open	−17 (67-67-69-68=271)	1 stroke	(United States) Tom Kite
2	Sep 20, 1987	Greater Milwaukee Open	−19 (70-66-67-66=269)	2 strokes	(United States) Wayne Levi, (United States) Robert Wrenn
3	Oct 4, 1992	Buick Southern Open	−10 (68-69-69=206) (Note: Shortened to 54 holes due to weather.)	1 stroke	(United States) Jim Gallagher Jr.

PGA Tour playoff record (0–2)

No.	Year	Tournament	Opponent	Result
1	1984	Isuzu-Andy Williams San Diego Open	(United States) Gary Koch	Lost to birdie on second extra hole
2	1991	H.E.B. Texas Open	(United States) Blaine McCallister	Lost to birdie on second extra hole

=== PGA of Japan Tour wins (1) ===
No.	Date	Tournament	Winning score	Margin of victory	Runner-up
1	May 2, 1982	Chunichi Crowns	−8 (69-67-66-70=272)	3 strokes	(Japan) Shigeru Uchida

=== Buy.com Tour wins (1) ===
No.	Date	Tournament	Winning score	Margin of victory	Runner-up
1	Jun 2, 2002	Northeast Pennsylvania Classic	−9 (69-68-74-64=275)	3 strokes	(United States) Roger Tambellini

=== South American Golf Circuit wins (1) ===
- 1980 Argentine Open

=== Other wins (5) ===
- 1977 Illinois Open Championship (as an amateur)
- 1981 Lille Open (France)
- 1982 Illinois Open Championship
- 1986 Chrysler Team Championship (with Scott Hoch)
- 1988 Jerry Ford Invitational

=== Champions Tour wins (1) ===
No.	Date	Tournament	Winning score	Margin of victory	Runner-up
1	Oct 3, 2010	Ensure Classic at Rock Barn	−18 (67-70-61=198)	1 stroke	(United States) Fred Couples

== Results in major championships ==
Tournament	1976	1977	1978	1979
Masters Tournament			T47	
U.S. Open	CUT			
The Open Championship				CUT
PGA Championship				

Tournament	1980	1981	1982	1983	1984	1985	1986	1987	1988	1989
Masters Tournament				T32		T6	CUT		T42	
U.S. Open	T22LA	T53			CUT	CUT		73		
The Open Championship										
PGA Championship		CUT	CUT	T42	T6	T59		CUT	CUT	

Tournament	1990	1991	1992	1993	1994	1995	1996	1997	1998	1999
Masters Tournament				T57						
U.S. Open			T44		CUT	T28			CUT	T42
The Open Championship		T32				T68				
PGA Championship		CUT	T56	T14	CUT					

Top 10
Did not play

LA = low amateur
CUT = missed the half-way cut
"T" indicates a tie for a place

=== Summary ===
Tournament	Wins	2nd	3rd	Top-5	Top-10	Top-25	Events	Cuts made
Masters Tournament	0	0	0	0	1	1	6	5
U.S. Open	0	0	0	0	0	1	11	6
The Open Championship	0	0	0	0	0	0	3	2
PGA Championship	0	0	0	0	1	2	11	5
Totals	0	0	0	0	2	4	31	18

- Most consecutive cuts made – 4 (1992 U.S. Open – 1993 PGA)
- Longest streak of top-10s – 2 (1984 PGA – 1985 Masters)

== Results in The Players Championship ==
Tournament	1981	1982	1983	1984	1985	1986	1987	1988	1989	1990	1991	1992	1993	1994	1995
The Players Championship	T8	T72	CUT	T54	4	CUT	CUT	CUT	T50	CUT	CUT	CUT	T46	T9	CUT

Top 10

CUT = missed the halfway cut
"T" indicates a tie for a place

== U.S. national team appearances ==
Amateur

- Walker Cup: 1977 (winners)
