= Greater Cleveland Open =

Golf tournament

Tournament information
- Location: Concord Township, Lake County, Ohio
- Established: 1990
- Course: Quail Hollow Resort
- Par: 72
- Tour: Buy.com Tour
- Format: Stroke play
- Prize fund: US$425,000
- Month played: June
- Final year: 2001

Tournament record score
- Aggregate: 267 Heath Slocum (2001)
- To par: −21 as above

Final champion
- (United States) Heath Slocum
- Location in the United States Location in Ohio

The Greater Cleveland Open was a golf tournament on the Buy.com Tour. It ran from 1990 to 2001. It was played at Quail Hollow Resort on the Devlin Course in Concord Township, Lake County, Ohio.

In 2001 the winner earned $76,500.

== Winners ==
Year	Winner	Score	To par	Margin of victory	Runner(s)-up	Ref
Buy.com Greater Cleveland Open
2001	(United States) Heath Slocum	267	−21	1 stroke	(Japan) Ryuji Imada	
Buy.com Cleveland Open
2000	(South Africa) Deane Pappas	273	−15	1 stroke	(South Africa) Tjaart van der Walt	
Nike Cleveland Open
1999	(United States) Matt Gogel	273	−15	Playoff	(United States) Casey Martin	
1998	(United States) Doug Dunakey	270	−18	1 stroke	(United States) Dennis Paulson	
1997	(United States) Mike Small	270	−18	1 stroke	(United States) Patrick Sheehan	
1996	(United States) Greg Twiggs	270	−18	1 stroke	(United States) Jimmy Johnston	
1995	(United States) Karl Zoller	274	−14	Playoff	(United States) Larry Silveira	
1994	(United States) Tommy Armour III	275	−13	Playoff	(United States) Scott Gump (United States) Tom Scherrer	
1993	(United States) Stan Utley	263	−17	3 strokes	(United States) Jerry Kelly	
Ben Hogan Cleveland Open
1992	(United States) David Jackson	199	−17	3 strokes	(United States) Dave Miley (United States) Mike Putnam	
1991	(United States) Jeff Gallagher	201	−15	1 stroke	(United States) Tom Lehman (United States) Doug Martin	
Ben Hogan Quail Hollow Open
1990	(United States) Barry Cheesman	207	−9	2 strokes	(United States) Kim Young	

== See also ==
- DAP Championship, a Web.com Tour Finals event in the Cleveland suburb of Beachwood to begin in 2016
- Rust-Oleum Championship, a Web.com Tour event in the Cleveland suburb of Westlake from 2013 to 2014
- Legend Financial Group Classic, a Web.com Tour event from 2005 to 2007
- Cleveland Open, a PGA Tour event from 1963 to 1972
