= Blaine McCallister =

American professional golfer (born 1958)

Personal information
- Nationality: United States
- Born: October 17, 1958 (age 68) Fort Stockton, Texas, U.S.
- Height: 5 ft 10 in (1.78 m)
- Weight: 190 lb (86 kg; 14 st)

Career
- Sport: Golf
- College: University of Houston
- Turned professional: 1981
- Current tour: Champions Tour
- Former tour: PGA Tour
- Professional wins: 8
- Highest ranking: 45 (December 10, 1989)

Number of wins by tour
- PGA Tour: 5
- PGA Tour of Australasia: 1
- Korn Ferry Tour: 1
- Other: 1

Best results in major championships
- Masters Tournament: T48: 1992
- PGA Championship: T19: 1990
- U.S. Open: T19: 1993
- The Open Championship: T57: 1990

Blaine McCallister (born October 17, 1958) is an American professional golfer who has played on the PGA Tour, Nationwide Tour and Champions Tour.

== Early life and amateur career ==
McCallister was born in Fort Stockton, Texas. McCallister is naturally left-handed but plays the game mix-handed; he writes left-handed, strikes the ball right-handed and putts left-handed.

McCallister attended the University of Houston and was a member of the golf team. His college roommates were future fellow professional golfer Fred Couples and future CBS Sports golf host Jim Nantz.

== Professional career ==
In 1981, McCallister turned pro. He joined the PGA Tour the following year. He had a total of five wins on the PGA Tour, all of which came in the late 1980s and early 1990s. As he entered his forties, McCallister began to split his playing time between the PGA Tour and the Nationwide Tour. He established the tournament record of 265 at the Northeast Pennsylvania Classic, which is his sole win on the Nationwide Tour.

After turning 50 in October 2008, McCallister began playing on the Champions Tour.

== Personal life ==
McCallister lives in Jacksonville, Florida.

== Professional wins (8) ==
=== PGA Tour wins (5) ===
No.	Date	Tournament	Winning score	Margin of victory	Runner-up
1	Jul 17, 1988	Hardee's Golf Classic	−19 (68-62-63-68=261)	3 strokes	(United States) Dan Forsman
2	Mar 5, 1989	Honda Classic	−22 (70-67-65-64=266)	4 strokes	(United States) Payne Stewart
3	Sep 17, 1989	Bank of Boston Classic	−13 (67-67-71-66=271)	1 stroke	(United States) Brad Faxon
4	Oct 6, 1991	H.E.B. Texas Open	−11 (66-64-69-70=269)	Playoff	(United States) Gary Hallberg
5	Sep 26, 1993	B.C. Open	−13 (68-71-65-67=271)	1 stroke	(Zimbabwe) Denis Watson

PGA Tour playoff record (1–2)

No.	Year	Tournament	Opponent	Result
1	1986	Bank of Boston Classic	(United States) Gene Sauers	Lost to birdie on third extra hole
2	1991	H.E.B. Texas Open	(United States) Gary Hallberg	Won with birdie on second extra hole
3	2000	Compaq Classic of New Orleans	(Paraguay) Carlos Franco	Lost to par on second extra hole

=== PGA Tour of Australasia wins (1) ===
No.	Date	Tournament	Winning score	Margin of victory	Runners-up
1	Jan 27, 1991	Vines Classic	−10 (70-68-70-70=278)	1 stroke	(Australia) Wayne Grady, (New Zealand) Greg Turner

=== Nationwide Tour wins (1) ===
No.	Date	Tournament	Winning score	Margin of victory	Runners-up
1	May 15, 2003	Northeast Pennsylvania Classic	−19 (68-64-64-69=265)	3 strokes	(United States) Bill Glasson

=== Other wins (1) ===
- 1986 Texas State Open

== Results in major championships ==
Tournament	1984	1985	1986	1987	1988	1989
Masters Tournament						CUT
U.S. Open	CUT				CUT	
The Open Championship						
PGA Championship				CUT	T25	T17

Tournament	1990	1991	1992	1993	1994	1995	1996	1997	1998	1999
Masters Tournament	CUT		T48		CUT					
U.S. Open	T56	T46		T19		CUT	T97			
The Open Championship	T57									
PGA Championship	T19	T57	T62		T36	CUT	CUT			

Tournament	2000	2001	2002
Masters Tournament			
U.S. Open			CUT
The Open Championship			
PGA Championship	T34		

Did not play

CUT = missed the half-way cut
"T" = tied

=== Summary ===
Tournament	Wins	2nd	3rd	Top-5	Top-10	Top-25	Events	Cuts made
Masters Tournament	0	0	0	0	0	0	4	1
U.S. Open	0	0	0	0	0	1	8	4
The Open Championship	0	0	0	0	0	0	1	1
PGA Championship	0	0	0	0	0	3	10	7
Totals	0	0	0	0	0	4	23	13

- Most consecutive cuts made – 8 (1990 U.S. Open – 1992 PGA)
- Longest streak of top-10s – 0

== See also ==
- Fall 1981 PGA Tour Qualifying School graduates
- 1982 PGA Tour Qualifying School graduates
- 1985 PGA Tour Qualifying School graduates
- 1997 PGA Tour Qualifying School graduates
- 1999 PGA Tour Qualifying School graduates
- 2001 PGA Tour Qualifying School graduates
- 2003 Nationwide Tour graduates
