= Deane Pappas =

South African golfer

Personal information
- Full name: Deane Pappas
- Nationality: South Africa; Greece
- Born: 12 December 1967 (age 58) Phalaborwa, South Africa
- Height: 1.80 m (5 ft 11 in)

Career
- Sport: Golf
- College: University of Arkansas
- Turned professional: 1992
- Current tour: Sunshine Tour
- Former tour: PGA Tour
- Professional wins: 5

Number of wins by tour
- Sunshine Tour: 2
- Korn Ferry Tour: 2
- Other: 1

Best results in major championships
- Masters Tournament: DNP
- PGA Championship: DNP
- U.S. Open: CUT: 2010
- The Open Championship: DNP

Deane Pappas (born 12 December 1967) is a South African professional golfer. He has won twice on both the Southern Africa-based Sunshine Tour and on the second-tier United States based Buy.com Tour, now the Web.com Tour.

== Early life and amateur career ==
Pappas was born in Phalaborwa, Limpopo province, South Africa, as the second youngest of four brothers, three of them to became professional golfers. He was a three-time All-American at the University of Arkansas, where he was a teammate of John Daly.

At the 1988 Eisenhower Trophy at Ullna Golf Club in Stockholm, Sweden, Pappas together with his brother Sean, was part of the four-men team representing Greece.

== Professional career ==
In 1992, Pappas turned professional. He joined the Sunshine Tour in 1994. Pappas won for the first time on the tour in 2001, at the prestigious South African PGA Championship. He claimed his second tour victory in 2009 at the Dimension Data Pro-Am.

Between 1996 and 2007, Pappas played extensively in the United States, winning two tournaments on the Buy.com Tour, the first in 2000 and the second the following year he played three seasons on the PGA Tour, the first in 1999 after finishing tied for second place at qualifying school. Pappas and his younger brother, Brenden, in 2001 became the first brothers to graduate simultaneously to the PGA Tour by finishing in the top 15 on the Buy.com Tour money list.

== Personal life ==
Pappas lives in the American state of Arkansas with his wife Shona, and two children, Callen and Devyn. They currently live in Jonesboro, Arkansas.

== Professional wins (5) ==
=== Sunshine Tour wins (2) ===
No.	Date	Tournament	Winning score	Margin of victory	Runner-up
1	11 Feb 2001	South African PGA Championship	−19 (68-67-67-67=269)	3 strokes	(South Africa) Don Gammon
2	25 Jan 2009	Dimension Data Pro-Am	−20 (65-66-69-68=268)	8 strokes	(South Africa) James Kamte

=== Buy.com Tour wins (2) ===
No.	Date	Tournament	Winning score	Margin of victory	Runner(s)-up
1	18 Jun 2000	Buy.com Cleveland Open	−15 (70-67-69-67=273)	1 stroke	(South Africa) Tjaart van der Walt
2	18 Mar 2001	Buy.com Monterrey Open	−17 (67-68-67-69=271)	1 stroke	(United States) Keoke Cotner, (United States) Tim Petrovic

=== Other wins (1) ===
- 2002 Nelson Mandela Invitational (with Hugh Baiocchi)

== Results in major championships ==
Tournament	2010
U.S. Open	CUT

CUT = missed the halfway cut
Note: Pappas only played in the U.S. Open.

== Team appearances ==
Amateur

- Eisenhower Trophy (representing Greece): 1988

== See also ==
- 1998 PGA Tour Qualifying School graduates
- 2001 Buy.com Tour graduates
- 2003 PGA Tour Qualifying School graduates
