= 2001 Buy.com Tour =

Golf tour season

2001 Buy.com Tour season
- Duration: March 8, 2001 – October 28, 2001
- Number of official events: 28 (Note: One further tournament was scheduled but was canceled.)
- Most wins: (United States) Pat Bates (3) (United States) Chad Campbell (3) (United States) Heath Slocum (3)
- Money list: (United States) Chad Campbell
- Player of the Year: (United States) Chad Campbell

The 2001 Buy.com Tour was the 12th season of the Buy.com Tour, the official development tour to the PGA Tour.

== Schedule ==
The following table lists official events during the 2001 season.

Date	Tournament	Location	Purse (US$)	Winner (Note: The number in parentheses after each winner's name is the number of Buy.com Tour events they had won up to and including that tournament. This information is only shown for Buy.com Tour members. It is rare for someone to accumulate many wins on the Buy.com Tour as success at this level usually leads to promotion to the PGA Tour.)	OWGR points	Notes
Mar 11	Buy.com Florida Classic	Florida	425,000	(United States) Chris Couch (1)	6	
Mar 18	Buy.com Monterrey Open	Mexico	450,000	(South Africa) Deane Pappas (2)	6	
Apr 1	Buy.com Louisiana Open	Louisiana	450,000	(United States) Paul Claxton (1)	6	
Apr 22	Buy.com Arkansas Classic	Arkansas	450,000	(United States) Brett Quigley (2)	6	New tournament
Apr 29	Buy.com Charity Pro-Am	South Carolina	500,000	(United States) Jonathan Byrd (1)	6	Pro-Am
May 6	Buy.com Carolina Classic	North Carolina	450,000	(United States) John Maginnes (3)	6	
May 13	Buy.com Virginia Beach Open	Virginia	425,000	(Namibia) Trevor Dodds (3)	6	
May 20	Buy.com Richmond Open	Virginia	425,000	(United States) Chad Campbell (1)	6	
Jun 3	Buy.com Steamtown Classic	Pennsylvania	425,000	(United States) Jason Hill (1)	6	
Jun 10	Samsung Canadian PGA Championship	Canada	450,000	(Canada) Richard Zokol (1)	6	New to Buy.com Tour
Jun 17	Buy.com Greater Cleveland Open	Ohio	425,000	(United States) Heath Slocum (1)	6	
Jun 24	Buy.com Dayton Open	Ohio	425,000	(United States) Todd Barranger (1)	6	
Jul 1	Buy.com Knoxville Open	Tennessee	425,000	(United States) Heath Slocum (2)	6	
Jul 8	Buy.com Hershey Open	Pennsylvania	425,000	(United States) John Rollins (1)	6	
Jul 15	Buy.com Wichita Open	Kansas	425,000	(United States) Jason Dufner (1)	6	
Jul 22	Buy.com Siouxland Open	South Dakota	425,000	(United States) Pat Bates (3)	6	
Jul 29	Buy.com Ozarks Open	Missouri	450,000	(United States) Steve Haskins (1)	6	
Aug 5	Buy.com Omaha Classic	Nebraska	525,000	(United States) Heath Slocum (3) (Note: Slocum earned immediate promotion to the PGA Tour, as this was his third win of the season.)	6	
Aug 12	Buy.com Fort Smith Classic	Arkansas	425,000	(United States) Jay Delsing (1)	6	
Aug 19	Buy.com Permian Basin Open	Texas	425,000	(United States) Chad Campbell (2)	6	
Sep 2	Buy.com Utah Classic	Utah	425,000	(United States) David Sutherland (1)	6	
Sep 9	Buy.com Tri-Cities Open	Washington	425,000	(United States) Guy Boros (1)	6	
~~Sep 16~~	Buy.com Oregon Classic	Oregon	–	Canceled (Note: Canceled due to the September 11 attacks.)	–	
Sep 23	Buy.com Boise Open	Idaho	556,000	(New Zealand) Michael Long (1)	6	
Sep 30	Buy.com Inland Empire Open	California	425,000	(United States) D. A. Points (1)	6	
Oct 7	Buy.com Monterey Peninsula Classic	California	450,000	(United States) Chad Campbell (3) (Note: Campbell earned immediate promotion to the PGA Tour, as this was his third win of the season.)	6	
Oct 14	Buy.com Gila River Classic	Arizona	425,000	(United States) Ben Crane (2)	6	New tournament
Oct 21	Buy.com Shreveport Open	Louisiana	425,000	(United States) Pat Bates (4)	6	
Oct 28	Buy.com Tour Championship	Alabama	600,000	(United States) Pat Bates (5)	6	Tour Championship

== Money list ==
The money list was based on prize money won during the season, calculated in U.S. dollars. The top 15 players on the money list earned status to play on the 2002 PGA Tour.

Position	Player	Prize money ($)
1	(United States) Chad Campbell	394,552
2	(United States) Pat Bates	352,261
3	(United States) Heath Slocum	339,670
4	(Australia) Rod Pampling	306,573
5	(South Africa) Deane Pappas	271,169

== Awards ==
Award	Winner	Ref.
Player of the Year (Jack Nicklaus Trophy)	(United States) Chad Campbell	
