= Karl Zoller =

American golfer

Personal information
- Nationality: United States
- Born: August 30, 1963 (age 63) Cleveland, Ohio, U.S.
- Height: 5 ft 9 in (1.75 m)
- Weight: 185 lb (84 kg; 13.2 st)

Career
- Sport: Golf
- College: Kent State University
- Turned professional: 1986
- Former tour: Nationwide Tour
- Professional wins: 1

Number of wins by tour
- Korn Ferry Tour: 1

Karl Zoller (born August 30, 1963) is an American professional golfer who played on the Nationwide Tour.

== Career ==
Zoller was born in Cleveland, Ohio. He played college golf at Kent State University where he was an All-American in 1985.

Zoller won the Nike Cleveland Open on the Nationwide Tour in 1995.

His son, Taylor, is on the golf team at Kent State.

== Amateur wins ==
This list may be incomplete

- 1985 Northeast Ohio Amateur Invitational, Ohio Amateur

== Professional wins (1) ==
=== Nike Tour wins (1) ===
No.	Date	Tournament	Winning score	Margin of victory	Runner-up
1	Jun 18, 1995	Nike Cleveland Open	−14 (72-66-69-67=274)	Playoff	(United States) Larry Silveira

Nike Tour playoff record (1–0)

No.	Year	Tournament	Opponent	Result
1	1995	Nike Cleveland Open	(United States) Larry Silveira	Won with birdie on first extra hole
