= Ben Crane =

American professional golfer (born 1976)

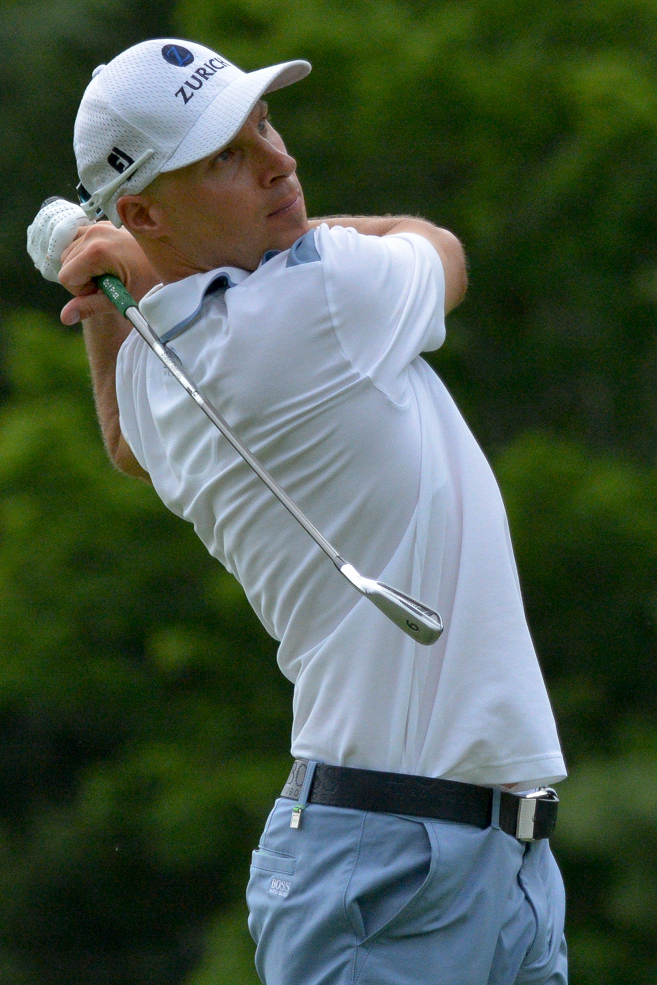
- Crane in 2013

Personal information
- Full name: Benjamin McCully Crane
- Nationality: United States
- Born: March 6, 1976 (age 50) Portland, Oregon, U.S.
- Height: 5 ft 11 in (1.80 m)
- Weight: 165 lb (75 kg; 11.8 st)
- Spouse: Heather Crane
- Children: 3

Career
- Sport: Golf
- College: Baylor University; University of Oregon
- Turned professional: 1999
- Current tour: PGA Tour Champions
- Former tours: PGA Tour; Buy.com Tour
- Professional wins: 9
- Highest ranking: 30 (November 27, 2005)

Number of wins by tour
- PGA Tour: 5
- Asian Tour: 1
- Korn Ferry Tour: 2
- PGA Tour Champions: 1

Best results in major championships
- Masters Tournament: T17: 2012
- PGA Championship: T9: 2004
- U.S. Open: T53: 2008
- The Open Championship: T11: 2006

Benjamin McCully Crane (born March 6, 1976) is an American professional golfer who plays on the PGA Tour.

== Early years and amateur career ==
Crane was born in Portland, Oregon. He was introduced to golf at age five by his grandfather. He grew up playing at the nearby Portland Golf Club, where Ben Hogan won the Portland Open in 1945. Crane graduated from Beaverton High School in 1994 and attended Baylor University in Waco, Texas, but did not play golf for the Bears. He transferred to the University of Oregon in Eugene, Oregon and played golf for the Ducks. He graduated in 1999 and turned professional that year.

== Professional career ==
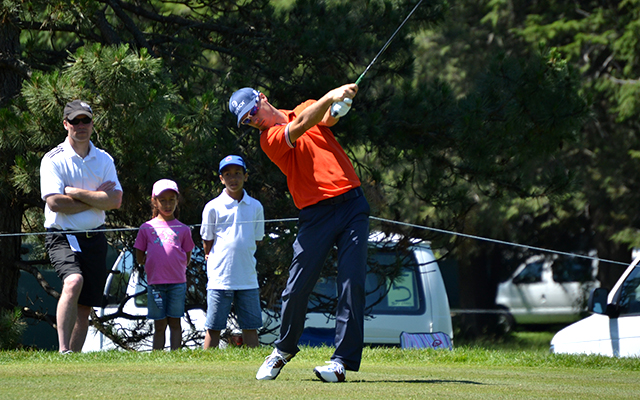
Crane in 2014

Crane won two events on the second tier Buy.com Tour, the first in 2000 and the second in 2001. In December 2001, Crane earned his PGA Tour card for 2002, and won for the first time on the PGA Tour at the BellSouth Classic the following year. His second win came in 2005 at the U.S. Bank Championship in Milwaukee. Also in 2005 he finished second at the Booz Allen Classic and Bell Canadian Open, third at the 84 Lumber Classic, sixth at the B.C. Open and seventh at The Tour Championship, which placed him 19th in the season earnings with over $2.4 million. In February 2006, just before he turned thirty, he was the highest-ranked American golfer under that age in the Official World Golf Ranking.

Crane has said that he does not like to know with whom he will be paired, saying, "I looked up to a lot of these guys who I'm now playing with. So, I didn't want to have to go to sleep thinking about it." He is also considered one of the slowest players on the tour. On at least two occasions his extremely slow progress through a course has become a media issue, including one in which a fellow tour player Rory Sabbatini played out of turn.

Crane missed the majority of the 2007 season due to back problems, and played on the PGA Tour in 2008 on a major medical extension. He finished 64th on the money list to retain his card for 2009. In January 2010, Crane carded a final-round 70 to win the Farmers Insurance Open at Torrey Pines by a single stroke. In May he finished third at the Crowne Plaza Invitational at Colonial, fourth at The Players Championship and seventh at the Byron Nelson Championship. In October, he won the CIMB Asia Pacific Classic Malaysia, an event co-sanctioned by the PGA Tour (but unofficial money) and Asian Tour. With 12 top-25s in 24 events, he ended 23rd on the money list with over $2.8 million.

He picked up his fourth win on the PGA Tour in 2011 at the McGladrey Classic, defeating Webb Simpson in a playoff. Crane shot a final round 63 to make the playoff, having at one stage been eight strokes back of the leader. The round included eight birdies and one bogey in ten holes from the 8th to the 17th. Crane picked up his fifth victory on the PGA Tour in 2014 at the FedEx St. Jude Classic. He would pick up the victory in wire to wire fashion, winning by a single stroke over Troy Merritt despite three bogeys and no birdies for his final round.

== Personal life ==
Crane is married to Heather Crane; the couple has four children. Crane is a Christian. Crane currently is one of four golfers in the PGA Tour exclusive boy band, "Golf Boys" - with Rickie Fowler, Bubba Watson, and Hunter Mahan. The Golf Boys currently have a popular YouTube video for the song "Oh Oh Oh." Farmers Insurance will donate $1,000 for every 100,000 views of the video. The charitable proceeds will support both Farmers and Ben Crane charitable initiatives.

In early December 2009 Life & Style magazine reported that Crane had called Tiger Woods a "fake and a phony" due to Woods' recently publicized marital infidelity. Crane denied making the remarks, stating that he was not even at Q-school, where the magazine claimed he was interviewed. "My wife and I have prayed for Tiger and Elin, and we want nothing but the best for them", Crane said. In January 2010 the magazine retracted its story, stating that the evidence indicated that the comments were made by someone impersonating Crane.

== Amateur wins ==
this list may be incomplete

- 1997 Pacific Northwest Amateur
- 1998 Pacific Coast Amateur

== Professional wins (9) ==
=== PGA Tour wins (5) ===
No.	Date	Tournament	Winning score	To par	Margin of victory	Runner(s)-up
1	Apr 6, 2003	BellSouth Classic	73-72-64-63=272	−16	4 strokes	(United States) Bob Tway
2	Jul 24, 2005	U.S. Bank Championship in Milwaukee	62-65-64-69=260	−20	4 strokes	(United States) Scott Verplank
3	Jan 31, 2010	Farmers Insurance Open	65-71-69-70=275	−13	1 stroke	(Australia) Marc Leishman, (Australia) Michael Sim, (United States) Brandt Snedeker
4	Oct 16, 2011	McGladrey Classic	65-70-67-63=265	−15	Playoff	(United States) Webb Simpson
5	Jun 8, 2014	FedEx St. Jude Classic	63-65-69-73=270	−10	1 stroke	(United States) Troy Merritt

PGA Tour playoff record (1–0)

No.	Year	Tournament	Opponent	Result
1	2011	McGladrey Classic	(United States) Webb Simpson	Won with par on second extra hole

=== Asian Tour wins (1) ===
No.	Date	Tournament	Winning score	To par	Margin of victory	Runner-up
1	Oct 31, 2010	CIMB Asia Pacific Classic Malaysia^{1}	67-64-66-69=266	−18	1 stroke	(England) Brian Davis

^{1}Co-sanctioned by the PGA Tour, but unofficial event on that tour.

=== Buy.com Tour wins (2) ===
No.	Date	Tournament	Winning score	To par	Margin of victory	Runners-up
1	Jul 23, 2000	Buy.com Wichita Open	67-63-66-67=263	−25	3 strokes	(United States) Kelly Grunewald, (United States) Vance Veazey
2	Oct 14, 2001	Buy.com Gila River Classic	63-66-64-68=261	−23	Playoff	(United States) Jason Caron, (United States) Bo Van Pelt

Buy.com Tour playoff record (1–0)

No.	Year	Tournament	Opponents	Result
1	2001	Buy.com Gila River Classic	(United States) Jason Caron, (United States) Bo Van Pelt	Won with birdie on fourth extra hole Caron eliminated by par on second hole

=== PGA Tour Champions wins (1) ===
No.	Date	Tournament	Winning score	To par	Margin of victory	Runners-up
1	Jun 7, 2026	American Family Insurance Championship (with (Northern Ireland) Darren Clarke)	62-54-67=183	−30	1 stroke	(United States) George McNeill and (United States) Kenny Perry

== Results in major championships ==
Tournament	2002	2003	2004	2005	2006	2007	2008	2009
Masters Tournament					CUT	CUT		
U.S. Open	CUT				62		T53	CUT
The Open Championship		CUT			T11			CUT
PGA Championship		T48	T9	T40	CUT		CUT	T43

Tournament	2010	2011	2012	2013	2014	2015
Masters Tournament	T24	CUT	T17			CUT
U.S. Open	CUT	CUT	CUT			
The Open Championship	CUT	CUT				
PGA Championship	T39	T37			WD	

Top 10
Did not play

CUT = missed the half-way cut
WD = withdrew
"T" = tied

=== Summary ===
Tournament	Wins	2nd	3rd	Top-5	Top-10	Top-25	Events	Cuts made
Masters Tournament	0	0	0	0	0	2	6	2
U.S. Open	0	0	0	0	0	0	7	2
The Open Championship	0	0	0	0	0	1	5	1
PGA Championship	0	0	0	0	1	1	9	6
Totals	0	0	0	0	1	4	27	11

- Most consecutive cuts made – 2 (four times)
- Longest streak of top-10s – 1

== Results in The Players Championship ==
Tournament	2003	2004	2005	2006	2007	2008	2009	2010	2011	2012	2013	2014	2015	2016	2017
The Players Championship	CUT	T66		T36		T6	T5	T4	T45	CUT	T8	CUT	CUT		T79

Top 10
Did not play

CUT = missed the halfway cut
"T" indicates a tie for a place

== Results in World Golf Championships ==
Tournament	2003	2004	2005	2006	2007	2008	2009	2010	2011	2012	2013	2014
Match Play				R32	R32			R16	R16	R64		
Championship			T37	WD				T37		T51		
Invitational	T42		T58	16				T58		WD		WD
Champions								T30	T46			

Top 10
Did not play

QF, R16, R32, R64 = Round in which player lost in match play
"T" = Tied
WD = Withdrew
Note that the HSBC Champions did not become a WGC event until 2009.

== See also ==
- 2001 PGA Tour Qualifying School graduates
