= Tommy Bahama Challenge =

PGA Tour golf event

The Tommy Bahama Challenge was a golf event on the PGA Tour's "Challenge Season," a slate of Tour events that do not count towards the PGA's official money season. It was held at the Grayhawk Golf Club in Scottsdale, Arizona, and lasted for only two years.

Sponsored by the clothing company Tommy Bahama, the event began in 2004, and pitted a team of four golfers from the United States versus an international team of four golfers, each with a non-playing captain. The tournament featured a unique rule — only players 30 or under could be invited. In 2004, scoring was also done unusually — each player was pitted against another for one-on-one matches; their scores were kept under stroke play rules, while the event's overall total was kept under match play rules. One player's win in a match earned his team a point. For the 2005 event, the format was changed — all the matches and the event were scored using match play rules.

In the event of a tie (which happened in 2004), the rules specified that a sudden-death playoff would take place using the alternate shot rule (for example, on a par 4, one player hits the tee shot, another hits it onto the green from its spot on the fairway, yet another attempts a putt and misses, and the last member makes the second putt to finish the hole).

The 2004 event, which took place in early November 2004, was broadcast on television in the United States by CBS on New Year's Day. The November 2005 event was aired on January 2, 2006.

== Winners ==
Year	Winning team and players	Score	Team captain	Losing team and players	Score	Team captain	Playoff summary
2005	(Australia) Geoff Ogilvy (England) Justin Rose (South Africa) Tim Clark (South Korea) Kevin Na	2½ points	David Feherty	(United States) Ryan Moore (United States) Arron Oberholser (United States) Zach Johnson (United States) Ben Crane	1½ points	Gary McCord	n/a
2004	(United States) Chad Campbell (United States) Zach Johnson (United States) Hank Kuehne (United States) Chris Riley	2 points	Gary McCord	(England) Paul Casey (England) Ian Poulter (England) David Howell (South Korea) Kevin Na	2 points	David Feherty	U.S. won on first playoff hole
