= Brenden Pappas =

South African professional golfer

Personal information
- Full name: Brenden Pappas
- Nationality: South Africa; Greece
- Born: 7 May 1970 (age 56) Phalaborwa, South Africa
- Height: 6 ft 3 in (1.91 m)
- Weight: 225 lb (102 kg; 16.1 st)

Career
- Sport: Golf
- College: University of Arkansas
- Turned professional: 1993
- Former tours: PGA Tour; Sunshine Tour; Web.com Tour
- Professional wins: 3

Number of wins by tour
- Sunshine Tour: 1
- Korn Ferry Tour: 1
- Other: 1

Best results in major championships
- Masters Tournament: DNP
- PGA Championship: CUT: 2004
- U.S. Open: DNP
- The Open Championship: DNP

Achievements and awards
- Southern Africa Tour Rookie of the Year: 1993–94
Medal record
Representing Greece
Mediterranean Games
Bronze medal – third place	1993 Languedoc-Roussillon	Individual
Bronze medal – third place	1993 Languedoc-Roussillon	Men's team

Brenden Pappas (born 7 May 1970) is a professional golfer from South Africa who currently plays on the Web.com Tour.

== Early life ==
Pappas was born in Phalaborwa, South Africa. He is the youngest of four brothers. Craigen Pappas, Sean Pappas, and Deane Pappas are his brothers; the latter two are professional golfers. He and Deane attended the University of Arkansas where he graduated in 1993 with a bachelor's degree in retail marketing.

== Professional career ==
In 1993, Pappas turned professional. He played on Southern Africa Tour until 2000, when he joined the Nationwide Tour. In his 2000 rookie year. He made 5 of 12 cuts and a little over $17,000. His 2001 season included over $188,000 in earnings and 6 top-10s, which included two runner-up finishes.

The year 2002 was Pappas' rookie year on the PGA Tour. He made 6 of 25 cuts and made $83,000. He played well on the PGA Tour a year later in 2003. He made over $1.3 million with 5 top-10s and his career high finish of 2nd at the Southern Farm Bureau Classic. In 2004, Pappas made 13 of 34 cuts and $524,000, outside the top 125 on the money list, meaning conditional status on the Tour for 2005.

Pappas played between the PGA and Nationwide Tours in 2005, making less than $300,000 for the two tours combined. He would play full-time on the Nationwide Tour for the 2006 season.

In 2006, Pappas picked up his first win in the United States with a win at the Rex Hospital Open in June 2006. Even with the win, he did not earn enough to get back onto the PGA Tour.

Pappas and his brother Dean would become the first brothers to graduate from the Nationwide Tour simultaneously in 2001, with Brenden earning over $180,000 with 6 top-10s.

His 2008 PGA Tour season included 9 made cuts in 24 events, $384,000 and a finish outside the top 150 on the money list.

He has been playing back full-time on the Nationwide Tour since the beginning of 2009, earning an unofficial win in Colombia in 2011; the win is considered unofficial because only 36 holes were played.

== Professional wins (3) ==
=== Southern Africa Tour wins (1) ===
No.	Date	Tournament	Winning score	Margin of victory	Runner-up
1	16 Oct 1998	Vodacom Series (Gauteng)	−11 (67-66-69=202)	1 stroke	(South Africa) John Dickson

=== Nationwide Tour wins (1) ===
No.	Date	Tournament	Winning score	Margin of victory	Runner-up
1	4 Jun 2006	Rex Hospital Open	−16 (66-68-65-69=268)	1 stroke	(South Korea) Charlie Wi

=== Other wins (1) ===
No.	Date	Tournament	Winning score	Margin of victory	Runner-up
1	6 Mar 2011	Pacific Rubiales Bogotá Open	−9 (67-65=133) (Note: The 2011 Pacific Rubiales Bogotá Open was shortened to 36 holes due to rain. Due to the length of the event this win is not officially recognised as a Nationwide Tour victory.)	1 stroke	(United States) Matt Every

== Results in major championships ==
Tournament	2004
PGA Championship	CUT

CUT = missed the half-way cut
Note: Pappas only played in the PGA Championship.

== See also ==
- 2001 Buy.com Tour graduates
- 2002 PGA Tour Qualifying School graduates
- 2007 Nationwide Tour graduates
- 2009 PGA Tour Qualifying School graduates
