= John Rollins (golfer) =

American professional golfer (born 1975)

Personal information
- Nationality: United States
- Born: June 25, 1975 (age 51) Richmond, Virginia, U.S.
- Height: 6 ft 0 in (1.83 m)
- Weight: 200 lb (91 kg; 14 st)
- Spouse: Heather
- Children: 2

Career
- Sport: Golf
- College: Virginia Commonwealth University
- Turned professional: 1997
- Current tours: PGA Tour (past champion status); Web.com Tour
- Professional wins: 4
- Highest ranking: 40 (April 22, 2007)

Number of wins by tour
- PGA Tour: 3
- Korn Ferry Tour: 1

Best results in major championships
- Masters Tournament: T20: 2007
- PGA Championship: T24: 2009
- U.S. Open: T42: 2007
- The Open Championship: 70th/T70: 2003, 2008

John Rollins (born June 25, 1975) is an American professional golfer.

== Early life ==
Rollins was born in Richmond, Virginia, where he attended Meadowbrook High School. He attended Virginia Commonwealth University, graduating in 1997.

== Professional career ==
Rollins turned professional in 1997. He has won three times on the PGA Tour, in 2002, 2006 and 2009, and once on the Buy.com Tour (now Web.com Tour) in 2001.

Rollins has also featured in the top 50 of the Official World Golf Ranking, peaking at 41st in 2007.

== Professional wins (4) ==
=== PGA Tour wins (3) ===
| No. | Date | Tournament | Winning score | Margin of victory | Runner(s)-up |
|---|---|---|---|---|---|
| 1 | Sep 8, 2002 | Bell Canadian Open | −16 (70-71-66-65=272) | Playoff | (United States) Neal Lancaster, (United States) Justin Leonard |
| 2 | Jul 23, 2006 | B.C. Open | −19 (67-70-68-64=269) | 1 stroke | (United States) Bob May |
| 3 | Aug 9, 2009 | Legends Reno–Tahoe Open | −17 (70-62-67-72=271) | 3 strokes | (Scotland) Martin Laird, (United States) Jeff Quinney |

PGA Tour playoff record (1–2)

| No. | Year | Tournament | Opponent(s) | Result |
|---|---|---|---|---|
| 1 | 2002 | Bell Canadian Open | (United States) Neal Lancaster, (United States) Justin Leonard | Won with birdie on first extra hole |
| 2 | 2003 | Buick Classic | (United States) Jonathan Kaye | Lost to eagle on first extra hole |
| 3 | 2007 | Bob Hope Chrysler Classic | (United States) Charley Hoffman | Lost to birdie on first extra hole |

=== Buy.com Tour wins (1) ===
| No. | Date | Tournament | Winning score | Margin of victory | Runner-up |
|---|---|---|---|---|---|
| 1 | Jul 8, 2001 | Buy.com Hershey Open | −11 (65-70-69-69=273) | Playoff | (Australia) Rod Pampling |

Buy.com Tour playoff record (1–0)

| No. | Year | Tournament | Opponent | Result |
|---|---|---|---|---|
| 1 | 2001 | Buy.com Hershey Open | (Australia) Rod Pampling | Won with birdie on first extra hole |

== Results in major championships ==
| Tournament | 2002 | 2003 | 2004 | 2005 | 2006 | 2007 | 2008 | 2009 | 2010 | 2011 | 2012 |
|---|---|---|---|---|---|---|---|---|---|---|---|
| Masters Tournament | | 47 | CUT | | | T20 | CUT | | CUT | | |
| U.S. Open | | T53 | T48 | CUT | CUT | T42 | T48 | | CUT | | |
| The Open Championship | | 70 | | | | CUT | T70 | | | | |
| PGA Championship | CUT | CUT | | T40 | CUT | CUT | | T24 | | T51 | CUT |

Did not play

CUT = missed the half-way cut
"T" = tied

=== Summary ===
| Tournament | Wins | 2nd | 3rd | Top-5 | Top-10 | Top-25 | Events | Cuts made |
|---|---|---|---|---|---|---|---|---|
| Masters Tournament | 0 | 0 | 0 | 0 | 0 | 1 | 5 | 2 |
| U.S. Open | 0 | 0 | 0 | 0 | 0 | 0 | 7 | 4 |
| The Open Championship | 0 | 0 | 0 | 0 | 0 | 0 | 3 | 2 |
| PGA Championship | 0 | 0 | 0 | 0 | 0 | 1 | 8 | 3 |
| Totals | 0 | 0 | 0 | 0 | 0 | 2 | 23 | 11 |

- Most consecutive cuts made – 3 (twice)
- Longest streak of top-10s – 0

== Results in The Players Championship ==
| Tournament | 2003 | 2004 | 2005 | 2006 | 2007 | 2008 | 2009 | 2010 | 2011 | 2012 | 2013 | 2014 |
|---|---|---|---|---|---|---|---|---|---|---|---|---|
| The Players Championship | CUT | CUT | CUT | T8 | T58 | CUT | T37 | T13 | CUT | T25 | CUT | T77 |

Top 10

CUT = missed the halfway cut
"T" indicates a tie for a place

== Results in World Golf Championships ==
| Tournament | 2002 | 2003 | 2004 | 2005 | 2006 | 2007 | 2008 | 2009 |
|---|---|---|---|---|---|---|---|---|
| Match Play | | | R64 | | | R64 | | |
| Championship | T43 | | | | | T28 | T20 | T70 |
| Invitational | | T67 | | | | T30 | | |
| Champions | | | | | | | | |

Did not play

QF, R16, R32, R64 = Round in which player lost in match play
"T" = Tied
Note that the HSBC Champions did not become a WGC event until 2009.

== See also ==
- 1999 PGA Tour Qualifying School graduates
- 2001 Buy.com Tour graduates
