= B.C. Open =

Golf tournament formerly on the PGA Tour

Coordinates: 42.091°N 76.081°W

Tournament information
- Location: Endicott, New York
- Established: 1971
- Course: En-Joie Golf Club
- Par: 72
- Length: 7,482 yards (6,842 m)
- Tour: PGA Tour
- Format: Stroke play
- Prize fund: US$3,000,000
- Month played: July
- Final year: 2006

Tournament record score
- Aggregate: 264 Jason Bohn (2005)
- To par: −24 as above

Final champion
- (United States) John Rollins
- Location in the United States Location in New York

The B.C. Open was a PGA Tour golf tournament in Broome County, New York, held annually from 1971 to 2006. In 1971, it was called the Broome County Open, and the next year it switched to the B.C. Open. In 1973, it became a PGA Tour regular 72-hole money event. From 2000 to 2006, it took place during the same week as The Open Championship, so the leading players were not available and it was one of the smaller events on the PGA Tour schedule. The purse for the final edition in 2006 was $3 million.

The tournament was played at the En-Joie Golf Course in Endicott in Upstate New York for every event through 2005. In 2006, severe flooding of the adjacent Susquehanna River forced the event to move to the Atunyote Golf Club at the Turning Stone Resort & Casino in Verona. The event was operated by Broome County Community Charities, Inc. Since its inception, the B.C. Open has turned back to local charities in excess of $7.4 million through 2003.

It was partially named after the comic strip B.C., created by Johnny Hart, who was born and raised in Endicott. Johnny Hart's B.C. characters were used in advertising the event.

The B.C. Open was held for the last time on the PGA Tour in 2006 due to a schedule revamp based on the introduction of the FedEx Cup. The success of the Turning Stone event in 2006 led to that venue hosting a "Fall Series" event beginning in 2007, the Turning Stone Resort Championship.

The Broome County Community Charities has hosted a Champions Tour event at the En-Joie Golf Course beginning in 2007, the Dick's Sporting Goods Open.

== Tournament highlights ==
- 1973: Hubert Green wins the B.C. Open the first time it is considered an official PGA Tour event. He finishes six shots ahead of Dwight Nevil.
- 1974: En Joie Golf Club assistant pro Richie Karl birdies the first hole of a sudden death playoff to defeat Bruce Crampton.
- 1978: Tom Kite shoots a first round 66 on his way to a wire-to-wire five shot victory over Mark Hayes.
- 1979: Howard Twitty earns his first PGA Tour triumph after Tom Purtzer and Doug Tewell each come to the 72nd hole tied for the lead but falter by making bogey and double bogey respectively.
- 1982: Calvin Peete opens the final round with a double bogey but still wins the tournament easily by seven shots over Jerry Pate.
- 1984: Wayne Levi birdies the 71st and 72nd holes to finish one shot ahead of Hal Sutton and Russ Cochran.
- 1987: Joey Sindelar becomes the first person to win the B.C. Open twice. He finishes four shots ahead of Jeff Sluman.
- 1991: Fred Couples tunes up for the Ryder Cup matches by competing at the B.C. Open. He beats Peter Jacobsen by three shots.
- 1992: John Daly wins for the first time since his 1991 PGA Championship victory. He finishes six shots ahead of Joel Edwards, Ken Green, Jay Haas, and Nolan Henke.
- 1993: Blaine McCallister birdies the 72nd hole to win by one shot over Denis Watson.
- 1995: Hal Sutton shoots a final round 61 to claim his first PGA Tour win in over nine years. He finishes one shot ahead of Jim McGovern.
- 1997: Gabriel Hjertstedt becomes the first Swedish born golfer to win on the PGA Tour. He finishes one shot ahead of Andrew Magee, Chris Perry, and Lee Rinker.
- 2000: Brad Faxon becomes the only B.C. Open winner to successfully defend his title. He beats Esteban Toledo by one shot.
- 2002: Spike McRoy shoots a final round 65 to overcome a seven-stroke deficit and finish one shot ahead of Fred Funk.
- 2003: Coming off a Champions Tour triumph just two weeks earlier, Craig Stadler shoots a final round 63 to win the B.C. Open by one shot over Alex Čejka and Steve Lowery.
- 2006: John Rollins shoots a final round 63 to win the last B.C. Open. He finishes one shot ahead of Bob May.

== Winners ==
| Year | Winner | Score | To par | Margin of victory | Runner(s)-up | Winner's share ($) |
B.C. Open
| 2006 | (United States) John Rollins | 269 | −19 | 1 stroke | (United States) Bob May | 540,000 |
| 2005 | (United States) Jason Bohn | 264 | −24 | 1 stroke | (United States) J. P. Hayes (Australia) Brendan Jones (United States) Ryan Palmer (United States) John Rollins | 540,000 |
| 2004 | (United States) Jonathan Byrd | 268 | −20 | 1 stroke | (United States) Ted Purdy | 540,000 |
| 2003 | (United States) Craig Stadler | 267 | −21 | 1 stroke | (Germany) Alex Čejka (United States) Steve Lowery | 540,000 |
| 2002 | (United States) Spike McRoy | 269 | −19 | 1 stroke | (United States) Fred Funk | 378,000 |
| 2001 | (United States) Jeff Sluman | 266 | −22 | Playoff | (Australia) Paul Gow | 360,000 |
| 2000 | (United States) Brad Faxon (2) | 270 | −18 | 1 stroke | (Mexico) Esteban Toledo | 360,000 |
| 1999 | (United States) Brad Faxon | 273 | −15 | Playoff | (United States) Fred Funk | 288,000 |
| 1998 | (United States) Chris Perry | 273 | −15 | 3 strokes | (United States) Peter Jacobsen | 270,000 |
| 1997 | (Sweden) Gabriel Hjertstedt | 275 | −13 | 1 stroke | (United States) Andrew Magee (United States) Chris Perry (United States) Lee Rinker | 234,000 |
| 1996 | (United States) Fred Funk | 197 (Note: Shortened to 54 holes due to weather.) | −16 | Playoff | (United States) Pete Jordan | 180,000 |
| 1995 | (United States) Hal Sutton | 269 | −15 | 1 stroke | (United States) Jim McGovern | 180,000 |
| 1994 | (United States) Mike Sullivan | 266 | −18 | 4 strokes | (United States) Jeff Sluman | 162,000 |
| 1993 | (United States) Blaine McCallister | 271 | −13 | 1 stroke | (Zimbabwe) Denis Watson | 144,000 |
| 1992 | (United States) John Daly | 266 | −18 | 6 strokes | (United States) Joel Edwards (United States) Ken Green (United States) Jay Haas (United States) Nolan Henke | 144,000 |
| 1991 | (United States) Fred Couples | 269 | −15 | 3 strokes | (United States) Peter Jacobsen | 144,000 |
| 1990 | (United States) Nolan Henke | 268 | −16 | 3 strokes | (United States) Mark Wiebe | 126,000 |
| 1989 | (United States) Mike Hulbert | 268 | −16 | Playoff | (United States) Bob Estes | 90,000 |
| 1988 | (United States) Bill Glasson | 268 | −16 | 2 strokes | (United States) Wayne Levi (United States) Bruce Lietzke | 90,000 |
| 1987 | (United States) Joey Sindelar (2) | 266 | −18 | 4 strokes | (United States) Jeff Sluman | 72,000 |
| 1986 | (United States) Rick Fehr | 267 | −17 | 2 strokes | (United States) Larry Mize | 72,000 |
| 1985 | (United States) Joey Sindelar | 274 | −10 | 1 stroke | (United States) Mike Reid | 54,000 |
| 1984 | (United States) Wayne Levi | 275 | −9 | 1 stroke | (United States) Russ Cochran (United States) Hal Sutton | 54,000 |
| 1983 | (United States) Pat Lindsey | 268 | −16 | 4 strokes | (United States) Gil Morgan | 54,000 |
| 1982 | (United States) Calvin Peete | 265 | −19 | 7 strokes | (United States) Jerry Pate | 49,500 |
| 1981 | (United States) Jay Haas | 270 | −14 | 3 strokes | (United States) Tom Kite | 49,500 |
| 1980 | (United States) Don Pooley | 271 | −13 | 1 stroke | (United States) Peter Jacobsen | 49,500 |
| 1979 | (United States) Howard Twitty | 270 | −14 | 1 stroke | (United States) Tom Purtzer | 49,500 |
| 1978 | (United States) Tom Kite | 267 | −17 | 5 strokes | (United States) Mark Hayes | 45,000 |
| 1977 | (United States) Gil Morgan | 270 | −14 | 5 strokes | (United States) Lee Elder | 40,000 |
| 1976 | (United States) Bob Wynn | 271 | −13 | 1 stroke | (United States) Bob Gilder | 40,000 |
| 1975 | (United States) Don Iverson | 274 | −10 | 1 stroke | (United States) Jim Colbert (Australia) David Graham | 35,000 |
| 1974 | (United States) Richie Karl | 273 | −11 | Playoff | (Australia) Bruce Crampton | 30,000 |
| 1973 | (United States) Hubert Green | 266 | −18 | 6 strokes | (United States) Dwight Nevil | 20,000 |
| 1972 | (United States) Bob Payne | 136 | −8 | 1 stroke | (United States) Dave Marad | 4,000 |
Broome County Open
| 1971 | (United States) Butch Harmon | 68 | −4 | Playoff | (United States) Chuck Courtney (United States) Norman Rack (United States) Hal Underwood | 2,000 |
