= Rod Pampling =

Australian professional golfer (born 1969)

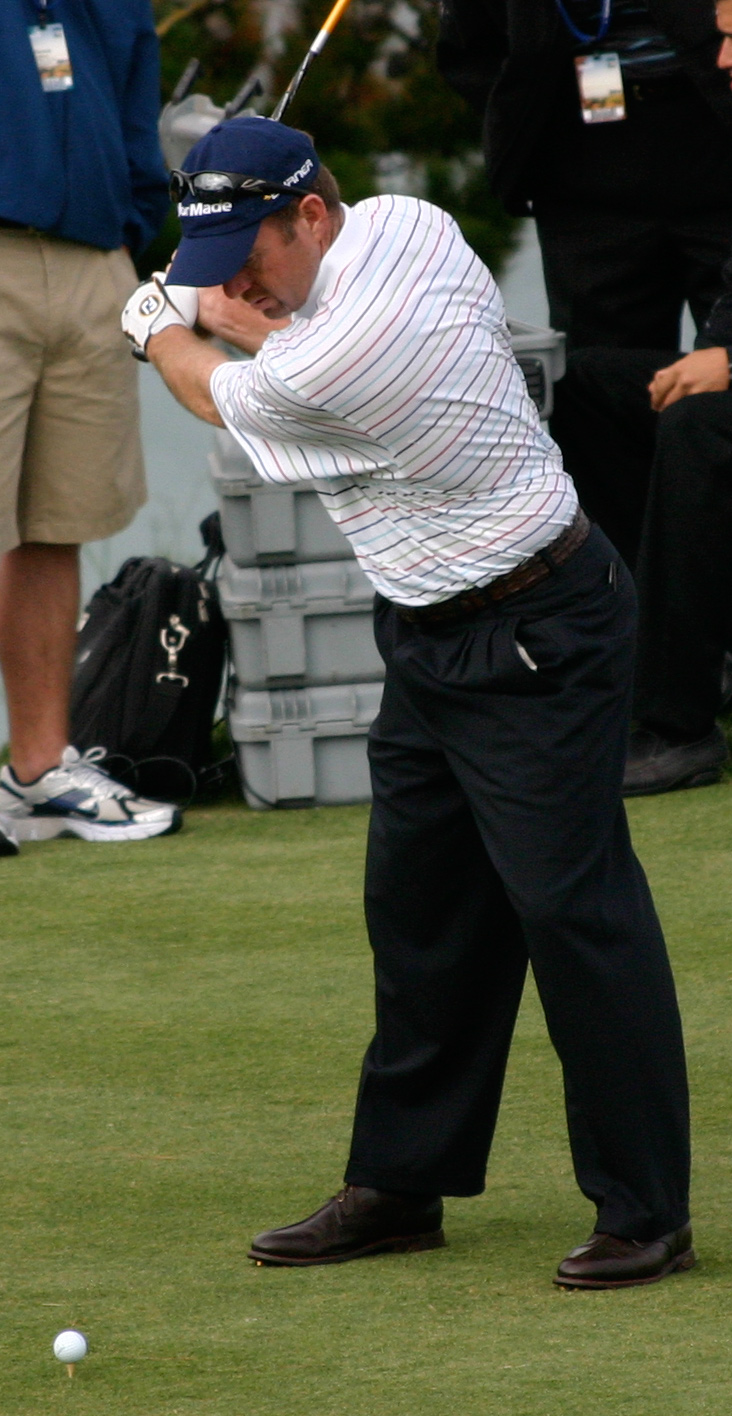

Personal information
- Full name: Rodney Pampling
- Nationality: Australia
- Born: 23 September 1969 (age 57) Redcliffe, Queensland, Australia
- Height: 5 ft 10 in (1.78 m)
- Weight: 175 lb (79 kg; 12.5 st)

Career
- Sport: Golf
- Turned professional: 1994
- Current tour: PGA Tour Champions
- Former tours: PGA Tour; European Tour; PGA Tour of Australasia; Web.com Tour
- Professional wins: 11
- Highest ranking: 22 (4 June 2006)

Number of wins by tour
- PGA Tour: 3
- European Tour: 1
- PGA Tour of Australasia: 2
- Korn Ferry Tour: 1
- PGA Tour Champions: 2

Best results in major championships
- Masters Tournament: T5: 2005
- PGA Championship: T14: 2003
- U.S. Open: T14: 2008
- The Open Championship: T27: 2004, 2007

Rodney Pampling (born 23 September 1969) is an Australian professional golfer. He currently plays on the PGA Tour Champions and was a three-time winner on the PGA Tour.

== Career ==
In 1969, Pampling was born in Redcliffe, Queensland.

In 1994, Pampling turned professional. He began his tournament golf career on the PGA Tour of Australasia where he won the 1999 Canon Challenge. In 1999, Pampling shot a 71 at Carnoustie during the opening round of the Open Championship, leading the field. However, he shot an 86 in the second round to miss the cut.

Shortly thereafter, he moved to America. He spent time on the NGA Hooters Tour, a minitour in the United States. In 2000 and 2001, he played on the PGA Tour's official developmental tour, the Buy.com Tour, and did well enough in his second season to gain promotion to the regular tour.

He achieved his first PGA Tour win at The International in 2004 and his second at the 2006 Bay Hill Invitational, which moved him into the top 50 of the Official World Golf Rankings. He continues to play a few events in his home country each year during the northern hemisphere winter. He won the Sportsbet Australian Masters at Huntingdale Golf Club in November 2008 beating Marcus Fraser in a 3-hole playoff after the two players tied at a 12-under par 276. As a European Tour co-sanctioned event, that win also earned him a two-year exemption on that tour. Pampling then became an endorser for AdvoCare, which produces weight management, nutritional supplement, and personal care products.

After a rough 2010, Pampling played the 2011 season with limited status as a past champion and through sponsor invites. He received a lifetime invitation to the AT&T National from tournament director Greg McLaughlin after personally trying to thank each tournament director that gave him a sponsor exemption during the 2011 season. Pampling clawed his way to 124th on the PGA Tour, regaining his Tour card by just over $2,000. Pampling finished the 2012 season 127th on the money list, just missing a PGA Tour card by two spots and $26,617. From 2013 to 2015, Pampling alternated between the PGA Tour and Web.com Tour.

Pampling won the Web.com Tour's BMW Charity Pro-Am in 2015 and regained his PGA Tour card through the Web.com Tour Finals in 2015 and 2016. He earned his first PGA Tour win in ten years at the 2016 Shriners Hospitals for Children Open. A clerical error allowed Pampling and eleven other golfers entry into the field, increasing the field from 132 to 144.

== Professional wins (11) ==
=== PGA Tour wins (3) ===
| No. | Date | Tournament | Winning score | Margin of victory | Runner-up |
|---|---|---|---|---|---|
| 1 | 8 Aug 2004 | The International | 31 pts (15-7-7-2=31) | 2 points | (Germany) Alex Čejka |
| 2 | 19 Mar 2006 | Bay Hill Invitational | −14 (70-65-67-72=274) | 1 stroke | (England) Greg Owen |
| 3 | 6 Nov 2016 | Shriners Hospitals for Children Open | −20 (60-68-71-65=264) | 2 strokes | (United States) Brooks Koepka |

=== European Tour wins (1) ===
| No. | Date | Tournament | Winning score | Margin of victory | Runner-up |
|---|---|---|---|---|---|
| 1 | 30 Nov 2008 (2009 season) | Sportsbet Australian Masters^{1} | −12 (71-68-70-67=276) | Playoff | (Australia) Marcus Fraser |

^{1}Co-sanctioned by the PGA Tour of Australasia

European Tour playoff record (1–0)

| No. | Year | Tournament | Opponent | Result |
|---|---|---|---|---|
| 1 | 2008 | Sportsbet Australian Masters | (Australia) Marcus Fraser | Won with par on third extra hole |

=== PGA Tour of Australasia wins (2) ===
| No. | Date | Tournament | Winning score | Margin of victory | Runner-up |
|---|---|---|---|---|---|
| 1 | 21 Feb 1999 | Canon Challenge | −18 (67-66-68-69=270) | 3 strokes | (Australia) Geoff Ogilvy |
| 2 | 30 Nov 2008 | Sportsbet Australian Masters^{1} | −12 (71-68-70-67=276) | Playoff | (Australia) Marcus Fraser |

^{1}Co-sanctioned by the European Tour

PGA Tour of Australasia playoff record (1–0)

| No. | Year | Tournament | Opponent | Result |
|---|---|---|---|---|
| 1 | 2008 | Sportsbet Australian Masters | (Australia) Marcus Fraser | Won with par on third extra hole |

=== Web.com Tour wins (1) ===
| No. | Date | Tournament | Winning score | Margin of victory | Runner-up |
|---|---|---|---|---|---|
| 1 | 17 May 2015 | BMW Charity Pro-Am | −25 (63-63-69-66=261) | 2 strokes | (United States) Kelly Kraft |

Web.com Tour playoff record (0–2)

| No. | Year | Tournament | Opponent(s) | Result |
|---|---|---|---|---|
| 1 | 2001 | Buy.com Hershey Open | (United States) John Rollins | Lost to birdie on first extra hole |
| 2 | 2001 | Buy.com Inland Empire Open | (United States) D. A. Points, (United States) Mark Wurtz | Points won with birdie on third extra hole Wurtz eliminated by birdie on first hole |

=== Other wins (1) ===
| No. | Date | Tournament | Winning score | Margin of victory | Runners-up |
|---|---|---|---|---|---|
| 1 | 12 Nov 2006 | Merrill Lynch Shootout (with (United States) Jerry Kelly) | −31 (64-62-59=185) | Playoff | (United States) Justin Leonard and (United States) Scott Verplank |

Other playoff record (1–0)

| No. | Year | Tournament | Opponents | Result |
|---|---|---|---|---|
| 1 | 2006 | Merrill Lynch Shootout (with (United States) Jerry Kelly) | (United States) Justin Leonard and (United States) Scott Verplank | Won with bogey on first extra hole |

=== PGA Tour Champions wins (2) ===
| No. | Date | Tournament | Winning score | Margin of victory | Runner(s)-up |
|---|---|---|---|---|---|
| 1 | 22 Aug 2021 | Boeing Classic | −12 (68-70-66=204) | 1 stroke | (United States) Jim Furyk, (United States) Tim Herron, (United States) Billy Mayfair |
| 2 | 15 Oct 2023 | SAS Championship | −15 (66-68-67=201) | 2 strokes | (New Zealand) Steven Alker |

=== PGA of Australia Legends Tour wins (2) ===
- 2023 Noosa Atlas Golf Services Legends Pro-Am, Sunshine Coast Masters (with Andre Stolz)

== Results in major championships ==
| Tournament | 1999 | 2000 | 2001 | 2002 | 2003 | 2004 | 2005 | 2006 | 2007 | 2008 | 2009 |
|---|---|---|---|---|---|---|---|---|---|---|---|
| Masters Tournament | | | | | | | T5 | T16 | T37 | | |
| U.S. Open | | | | | CUT | | CUT | T32 | CUT | T14 | CUT |
| The Open Championship | CUT | | | | | T27 | T78 | T35 | T27 | CUT | CUT |
| PGA Championship | | | | | T14 | T55 | CUT | CUT | T42 | CUT | CUT |

| Tournament | 2010 | 2011 | 2012 | 2013 | 2014 | 2015 | 2016 | 2017 |
|---|---|---|---|---|---|---|---|---|
| Masters Tournament | | | | | | | | CUT |
| U.S. Open | | | 70 | | CUT | | | |
| The Open Championship | | | | | | CUT | CUT | |
| PGA Championship | | | | | | | | CUT |

Top 10
Did not play

CUT = missed the half-way cut
"T" = tied

=== Summary ===
| Tournament | Wins | 2nd | 3rd | Top-5 | Top-10 | Top-25 | Events | Cuts made |
|---|---|---|---|---|---|---|---|---|
| Masters Tournament | 0 | 0 | 0 | 1 | 1 | 2 | 4 | 3 |
| U.S. Open | 0 | 0 | 0 | 0 | 0 | 1 | 8 | 3 |
| The Open Championship | 0 | 0 | 0 | 0 | 0 | 0 | 9 | 4 |
| PGA Championship | 0 | 0 | 0 | 0 | 0 | 1 | 8 | 3 |
| Totals | 0 | 0 | 0 | 1 | 1 | 4 | 29 | 13 |

- Most consecutive cuts made – 4 (2003 PGA – 2005 Masters)
- Longest streak of top-10s – 1

== Results in The Players Championship ==
| Tournament | 2003 | 2004 | 2005 | 2006 | 2007 | 2008 | 2009 |
|---|---|---|---|---|---|---|---|
| The Players Championship | CUT | T58 | T27 | CUT | T44 | CUT | T79 |

| Tournament | 2010 | 2011 | 2012 | 2013 | 2014 | 2015 | 2016 | 2017 | 2018 |
|---|---|---|---|---|---|---|---|---|---|
| The Players Championship | CUT | | T56 | | | | | T48 | CUT |

Did not play

CUT = missed the halfway cut
"T" indicates a tie for a place

== Results in World Golf Championships ==
Results not in chronological order before 2015.

| Tournament | 1999 | 2000 | 2001 | 2002 | 2003 | 2004 | 2005 | 2006 | 2007 | 2008 |
|---|---|---|---|---|---|---|---|---|---|---|
| Championship | T37 | | NT^{1} | | | | T41 | T38 | T28 | |
| Match Play | | | | | | | R64 | R64 | R32 | R16 |
| Invitational | | | | | | T14 | T13 | T45 | T14 | T56 |

| Tournament | 2009 | 2010 | 2011 | 2012 | 2013 | 2014 | 2015 | 2016 | 2017 |
|---|---|---|---|---|---|---|---|---|---|
| Championship | T9 | | | | | | | | |
| Match Play | R64 | | | | | | | | |
| Invitational | | | | | | | | | T74 |
| Champions | T40 | | | | | | | | |

^{1}Cancelled due to 9/11

Top 10
Did not play

QF, R16, R32, R64 = Round in which player lost in match play
"T" = tied
NT = No tournament
Note that the HSBC Champions did not become a WGC event until 2009.

== Results in senior major championships ==
Results not in chronological order.

| Tournament | 2020 | 2021 | 2022 | 2023 | 2024 | 2025 | 2026 |
|---|---|---|---|---|---|---|---|
| Senior PGA Championship | NT | T20 | T39 | T49 | CUT | CUT | |
| The Tradition | NT | 14 | T3 | T40 | T37 | T46 | T54 |
| U.S. Senior Open | NT | 4 | T13 | T27 | CUT | T22 | |
| Senior Players Championship | T5 | T7 | T11 | T16 | T67 | T33 | T50 |
| Senior British Open Championship | NT | | | T48 | T52 | CUT | T32 |

Top 10
Did not play

CUT = missed the halfway cut
"T" indicates a tie for a place
NT = no tournament due to COVID-19 pandemic

== See also ==
- 2001 Buy.com Tour graduates
- 2015 Web.com Tour Finals graduates
- 2016 Web.com Tour Finals graduates
