= Jonathan Byrd (golfer) =

American professional golfer (born 1978)

Personal information
- Full name: Jonathan Currie Byrd
- Nationality: United States
- Born: January 27, 1978 (age 48) Anderson, South Carolina, U.S.
- Height: 5 ft 9 in (1.75 m)
- Weight: 160 lb (73 kg; 11 st)
- Spouse: Amanda Byrd (m. 2002)
- Children: 3

Career
- Sport: Golf
- College: Clemson University
- Turned professional: 2000
- Current tours: Korn Ferry Tour; PGA Tour (past champion status)
- Professional wins: 7
- Highest ranking: 39 (June 5, 2011)

Number of wins by tour
- PGA Tour: 5
- Korn Ferry Tour: 2

Best results in major championships
- Masters Tournament: T8: 2003
- PGA Championship: T20: 2006
- U.S. Open: T15: 2003
- The Open Championship: T23: 2007

Achievements and awards
- PGA Tour Rookie of the Year: 2002

Jonathan Currie Byrd (born January 27, 1978) is an American professional golfer. He was the 2002 PGA Tour Rookie of the Year, and has won five times on the PGA Tour.

== Amateur career ==
Byrd was born in Anderson, South Carolina. He attended Clemson University from 1997 to 2000. During his Clemson career, Byrd was the first four-time First Team All-ACC player in Clemson history and was named a First Team All-America in 1999. He represented the United States on the Walker Cup team in 1999.

== Professional career ==
Byrd turned professional in 2000 and played on the Buy.com Tour (now Korn Ferry Tour), winning the Buy.com Charity Pro-Am at The Cliffs and finishing eighth on the money list.

In his first season on the PGA Tour in 2002, Byrd won the Buick Challenge and was named PGA Tour Rookie of the Year. Byrd won the B.C. Open in 2004 and the John Deere Classic in 2007.

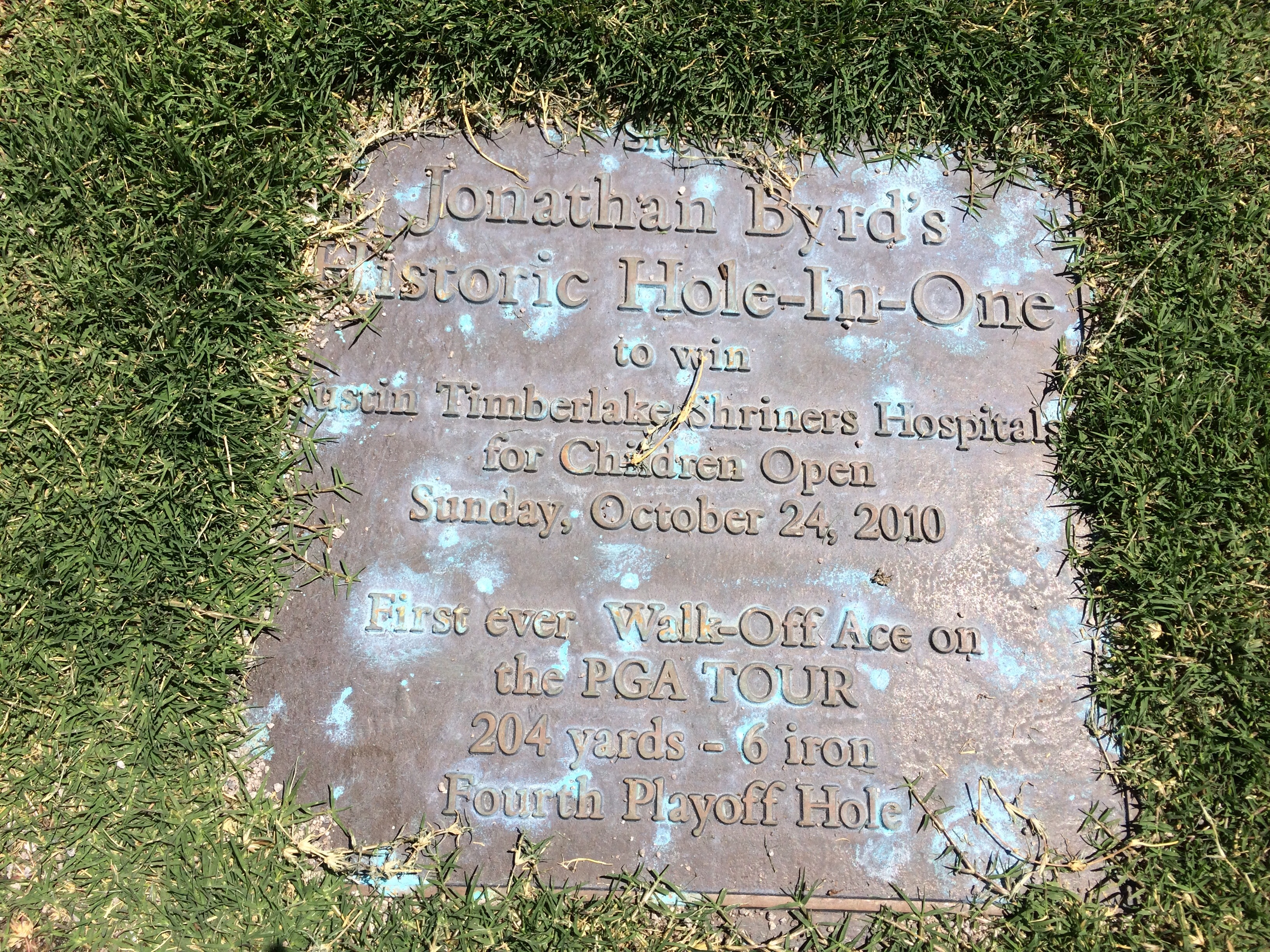
Plaque commemorating Jonathan Byrd's sudden-death playoff win at the Justin Timberlake Shriners Hospitals for Children Open on October 24, 2010

Byrd had an average season in 2008 with two top-10s and a little over $1,000,000 in earnings. His best finish in 2009 was at the Memorial Tournament, where he was joint second round leader with Jim Furyk. Byrd would go on to finish T3.

On October 24, 2010, Byrd defeated Martin Laird and Cameron Percy in a sudden-death playoff at the Justin Timberlake Shriners Hospitals for Children Open for his fourth PGA Tour title. Byrd made a hole-in-one on the fourth hole of the playoff, the par-3 17th, to win the championship. On January 9, 2011, Byrd defeated Robert Garrigus on the second hole of a playoff to win the PGA Tour season opener the Hyundai Tournament of Champions.

On October 2, 2017, Byrd won the 2017 Web.com Tour Championship by four strokes, securing his full PGA Tour card for the first time since 2014.

== Personal life ==
On July 7, 2009, Byrd's father, James, died aged 65 after a long struggle with brain cancer. The death of his father caused Byrd to withdraw from the John Deere Classic, an event he won in 2007.

== Awards and honors ==
In 2002, Byrd earned the PGA Tour Rookie of the Year award.

== Amateur wins ==
this list may be incomplete

- 1999 Northeast Amateur

== Professional wins (7) ==
=== PGA Tour wins (5) ===
| No. | Date | Tournament | Winning score | Margin of victory | Runner(s)-up |
|---|---|---|---|---|---|
| 1 | Oct 27, 2002 | Buick Challenge | −27 (67-66-65-63=261) | 1 stroke | (United States) David Toms |
| 2 | Jul 18, 2004 | B.C. Open | −20 (67-65-68-68=268) | 1 stroke | (United States) Ted Purdy |
| 3 | Jul 15, 2007 | John Deere Classic | −18 (67-68-65-66=266) | 1 stroke | (South Africa) Tim Clark |
| 4 | Oct 24, 2010 | Justin Timberlake Shriners Hospitals for Children Open | −21 (66-63-66-68=263) | Playoff | (Scotland) Martin Laird, (Australia) Cameron Percy |
| 5 | Jan 9, 2011 | Hyundai Tournament of Champions | −24 (69-63-69-67=268) | Playoff | (United States) Robert Garrigus |

PGA Tour playoff record (2–1)

| No. | Year | Tournament | Opponent(s) | Result |
|---|---|---|---|---|
| 1 | 2010 | Justin Timberlake Shriners Hospitals for Children Open | (Scotland) Martin Laird, (Australia) Cameron Percy | Won with eagle on fourth extra hole |
| 2 | 2011 | Hyundai Tournament of Champions | (United States) Robert Garrigus | Won with par on second extra hole |
| 3 | 2011 | Wells Fargo Championship | (United States) Lucas Glover | Lost to par on first extra hole |

=== Web.com Tour wins (2) ===
Legend
Finals events (1)
Other Web.com Tour (1)

| No. | Date | Tournament | Winning score | Margin of victory | Runner-up |
|---|---|---|---|---|---|
| 1 | Apr 29, 2001 | Buy.com Charity Pro-Am | −18 (67-70-66-66=269) | 1 stroke | (South Africa) Brenden Pappas |
| 2 | Oct 2, 2017 | Web.com Tour Championship | −24 (64-65-64-67=260) | 4 strokes | (United States) Sam Saunders, (United States) Shawn Stefani |

== Results in major championships ==
| Tournament | 2003 | 2004 | 2005 | 2006 | 2007 | 2008 | 2009 | 2010 | 2011 | 2012 |
|---|---|---|---|---|---|---|---|---|---|---|
| Masters Tournament | T8 | CUT | | | | CUT | | | CUT | T27 |
| U.S. Open | T15 | CUT | | | | CUT | | | CUT | T56 |
| The Open Championship | | | | | T23 | | | | CUT | CUT |
| PGA Championship | CUT | CUT | | T20 | CUT | CUT | | | CUT | CUT |

Top 10
Did not play

CUT = missed the half way cut
"T" indicates a tie for a place.

=== Summary ===
| Tournament | Wins | 2nd | 3rd | Top-5 | Top-10 | Top-25 | Events | Cuts made |
|---|---|---|---|---|---|---|---|---|
| Masters Tournament | 0 | 0 | 0 | 0 | 1 | 1 | 5 | 2 |
| U.S. Open | 0 | 0 | 0 | 0 | 0 | 1 | 5 | 2 |
| The Open Championship | 0 | 0 | 0 | 0 | 0 | 1 | 3 | 1 |
| PGA Championship | 0 | 0 | 0 | 0 | 0 | 1 | 7 | 1 |
| Totals | 0 | 0 | 0 | 0 | 1 | 4 | 20 | 6 |

- Most consecutive cuts made – 2 (three times)
- Longest streak of top-10s – 1

== Results in The Players Championship ==
| Tournament | 2003 | 2004 | 2005 | 2006 | 2007 | 2008 | 2009 | 2010 | 2011 | 2012 | 2013 | 2014 |
|---|---|---|---|---|---|---|---|---|---|---|---|---|
| The Players Championship | CUT | CUT | T32 | CUT | T16 | T32 | T37 | CUT | T41 | T12 | CUT | CUT |

Did not play

CUT = missed the halfway cut
"T" indicates a tie for a place

== Results in World Golf Championships ==
| Tournament | 2003 | 2004 | 2005 | 2006 | 2007 | 2008 | 2009 | 2010 | 2011 | 2012 |
|---|---|---|---|---|---|---|---|---|---|---|
| Match Play | | | | | | R16 | | | R64 | R64 |
| Championship | | | | | | T65 | | | T10 | T35 |
| Invitational | T71 | | | | | | | | T59 | T55 |
| Champions | | | | | | | | | T23 | |

Top 10
Did not play

QF, R16, R32, R64 = Round in which player lost in match play
"T" = Tied
Note that the HSBC Champions did not become a WGC event until 2009.

== PGA Tour career summary ==
| Season | Wins | Earnings ($) | Rank |
|---|---|---|---|
| 2000 | 0 | 14,130 | – |
| 2001 | 0 | 8,400 | – |
| 2002 | 1 | 1,462,713 | 39 |
| 2003 | 0 | 1,430,538 | 47 |
| 2004 | 1 | 1,133,165 | 70 |
| 2005 | 0 | 726,023 | 111 |
| 2006 | 0 | 1,408,418 | 63 |
| 2007 | 1 | 1,854,906 | 42 |
| 2008 | 0 | 1,039,584 | 101 |
| 2009 | 0 | 1,316,771 | 67 |
| 2010 | 1 | 1,534,981 | 55 |
| 2011 | 1 | 2,938,920 | 22 |
| 2012 | 0 | 1,616,789 | 50 |
| 2013 | 0 | 428,966 | 146 |
| 2014 | 0 | 617,014 | 133 |
| 2015 | 0 | 446,732 | 163 |
| 2016 | 0 | 58,655 | 219 |
| 2017 | 0 | 328,337 | 176 |
| 2018 | 0 | 267,055 | 186 |
| 2019 | 0 | 550,547 | 162 |
| 2020 | 0 | 166,222 | 198 |
| Career* | 5 | 19,348,865 | 87 |

* As of the 2020 season.
** Byrd did not join the PGA Tour until 2002 so he was not ranked on the money list until then.

== U.S. national team appearances ==
Amateur

- Palmer Cup: 1999 (winners), 2000
- Walker Cup: 1999

Professional

- Wendy's 3-Tour Challenge (representing PGA Tour): 2011

== See also ==
- 2001 Buy.com Tour graduates
- 2017 Web.com Tour Finals graduates
