= Professional golf career of Tiger Woods =

American professional golfer Tiger Woods has enjoyed one of the most successful golfing careers of all time. After competing in amateur events since he was a toddler and representing Stanford University on a golf scholarship, Woods left college after two years to turn professional at the age of 20.

== 1996–1998: Early years and first major win ==
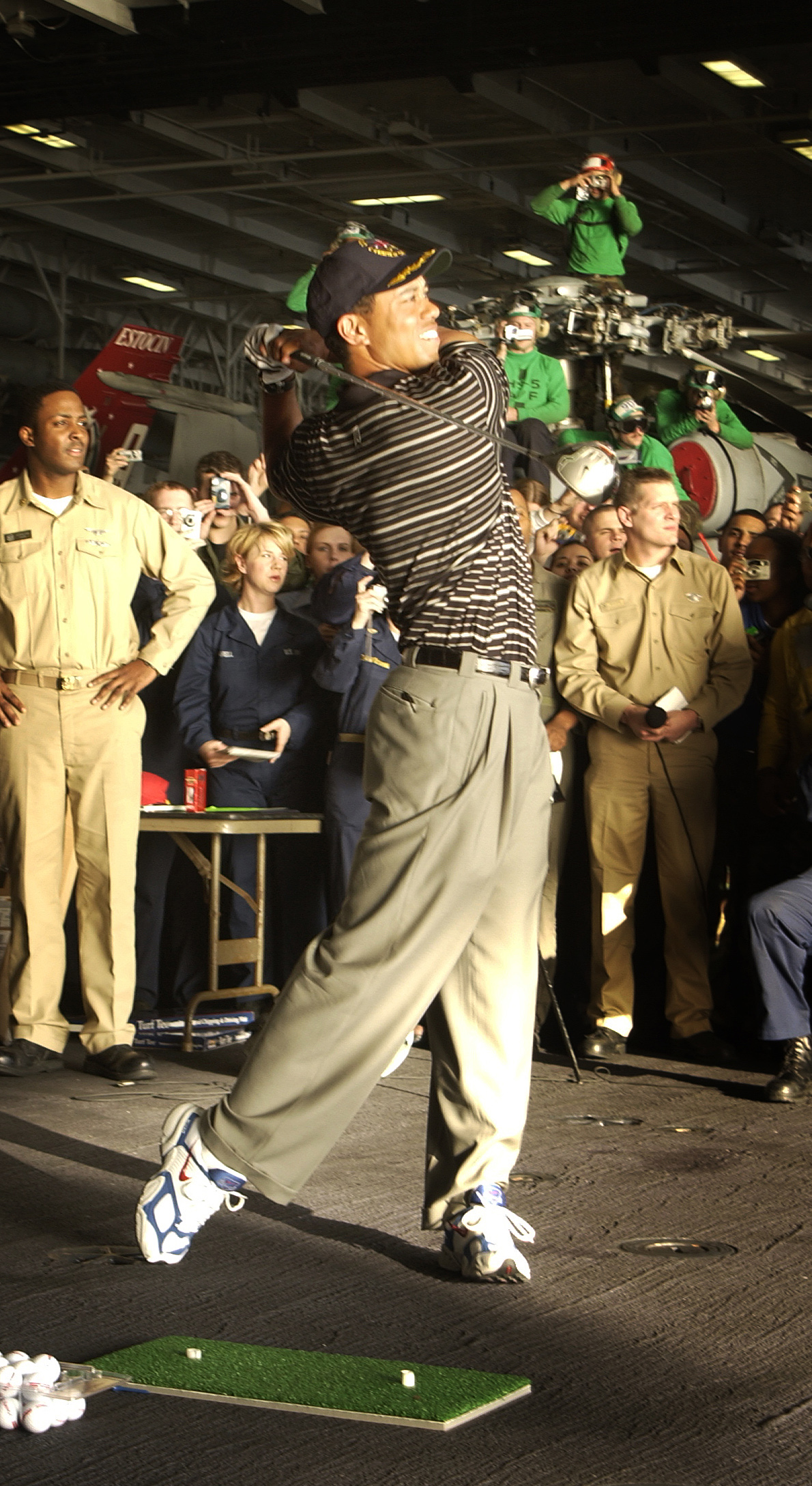
Woods giving a driving demonstration aboard the USS George Washington.

With the announcement "Hello, World." Tiger Woods became a professional golfer in August 1996 and signed endorsement deals worth $40 million from Nike, Inc. and $20 million from Titleist. These endorsement contracts were the highest in golf history up to that point. He played his first professional golf event at the Greater Milwaukee Open, tying for 60th place, recorded a hole-in-one, and would win two events in the next three months to qualify for the Tour Championship. For his efforts, Woods was named Sports Illustrated's 1996 Sportsman of the Year and PGA Tour Rookie of the Year. He began his tradition of wearing a red shirt during the final round of tournaments, which was a link to his college days at Stanford.

The following April, Woods won his first major, The Masters, with a record score of 18-under-par 270, by a record margin of 12 strokes. The landmark victory made Woods the tournament's youngest-ever winner, as well as its first African-American winner (and its first Asian-American winner). Woods set 20 Masters records in 1997 and tied six others. He went on to win another three PGA Tour events that year, and on June 15, 1997, in only his 42nd week as a professional, rose to number one in the Official World Golf Ranking, the fastest-ever ascent to world No. 1. At the conclusion of the 1997 season, Woods was named PGA Player of the Year, the first time a golfer had won the award in just his second year as a professional.

While expectations for Woods were high, his play faded in the second half of 1997, and in 1998 he only won a single PGA Tour event. He answered critics of his "slump" and what seemed to be wavering form by maintaining he was undergoing extensive swing changes with his coach, Butch Harmon, and was hoping to do better in the future.

== 1999–2002: Slams ==
In June 1999, Woods won the Memorial Tournament, a victory that touched off one of the greatest sustained periods of dominance in the history of men's golf. He completed his 1999 campaign by winning his last four starts —- including the PGA Championship -— and finished the season with eight wins, a feat not achieved since 1974. Woods was voted PGA Tour Player of the Year and Associated Press Male Athlete of the Year for the second time in three years.

Picking up where he had left off in 1999, Woods started 2000 with his fifth consecutive victory and began a record-setting season. He extended his win streak to six at the AT&T Pebble Beach National Pro-Am in February with a memorable comeback—trailing by seven strokes with seven holes to play, he finished eagle-birdie-par-birdie for a 64 and a two-stroke victory. His six consecutive wins were the most since Ben Hogan in 1948. At his next tournament, the Buick Invitational, he finished tied for second, breaking the streak, but earned enough money to put him at the top of the PGA Tour's career money list, a position he has held ever since. In the 2000 U.S. Open, he broke or tied nine U.S. Open records with his 15-stroke win, including Old Tom Morris's record for the largest victory margin ever in a major championship, which had stood since 1862. He led by a record ten strokes going into the final round, and Sports Illustrated called it "the greatest performance in golf history." In the 2000 Open Championship at St Andrews, which he won by eight strokes, he set the record for lowest score to par (−19) in any major tournament, and Woods at one time held at least a share of that record in all four major championships (since eclipsed by Rory McIlroy's −16 at the 2011 U.S. Open and Jason Day's −20 at the 2015 PGA Championship). At 24, he became the youngest golfer to achieve the Career Grand Slam.

Woods's major championship streak was seriously threatened at the 2000 PGA Championship, when Bob May went head-to-head with Woods on Sunday at Valhalla Golf Club. However, Woods played the last twelve holes of regulation seven under par, and won a three-hole aggregate playoff over May with a birdie on the first hole and pars on the next two. He joined Ben Hogan (1953) as the only other player to win three professional majors in one season. Three weeks later, he won his third straight start on Tour at the Bell Canadian Open, becoming only the second man after Lee Trevino in 1971 to win the Triple Crown of Golf (U.S., British, and Canadian Opens) in one year. By the end of Woods' 2000 campaign, he had won three consecutive majors, nine PGA Tour events, and had set or tied 27 Tour records. Of the twenty events he entered, he finished in the top three fourteen times. His adjusted scoring average of 67.79 and his actual scoring average of 68.17 were the lowest in PGA Tour history, besting his own record of 68.43 in 1999 and Byron Nelson's average of 68.33 in 1945. He was named the 2000 Sports Illustrated Sportsman of the Year, becoming the first athlete to be honored twice, a feat that was matched by LeBron James in 2016. Woods was ranked as the twelfth best golfer of all time by Golf Digest magazine just four years after he turned professional.

The following season, Woods continued to dominate. His 2001 Masters Tournament win marked the only time in the modern era of the Grand Slam that any player has held all four major championship titles at the same time, a feat now known as the "Tiger Slam". It is not viewed as a true Grand Slam, however, because it was not achieved in a calendar year. Surprisingly, he was not a factor in the three remaining majors of the year, but finished with the most PGA Tour wins in the season, with five. In 2002, he started strongly, joining Nick Faldo (1989–90) and Jack Nicklaus (1965–66) as the only men to have won back-to-back Masters Tournaments.

Two months later, Woods was the only player under par at the U.S. Open, and resurrected buzz about the calendar Grand Slam, which had eluded him in 2000. All eyes were on Woods at the Open Championship, but his third round score of 81 in dreadful weather at Muirfield ended his Grand Slam hopes. At the PGA Championship, he nearly repeated his 2000 feat of winning three majors in one year, but bogeys at the 13th and 14th holes in the final round cost him the championship by one stroke. Nonetheless, he took home the money title, Vardon Trophy, and Player of the Year honors for the fourth year in a row.

== 2003–2004: Swing adjustments ==
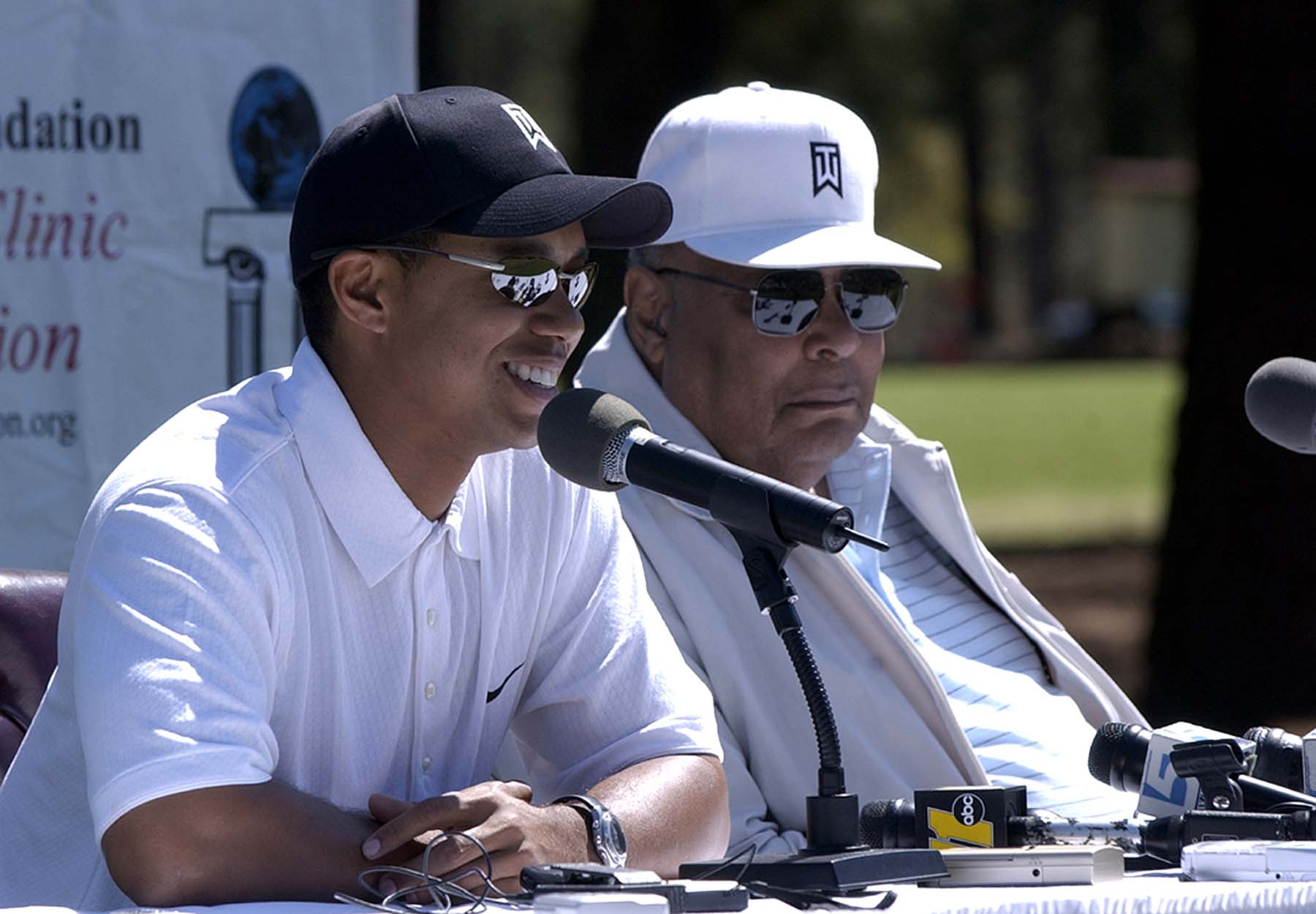
Tiger and his father Earl Woods at a press conference at Fort Bragg

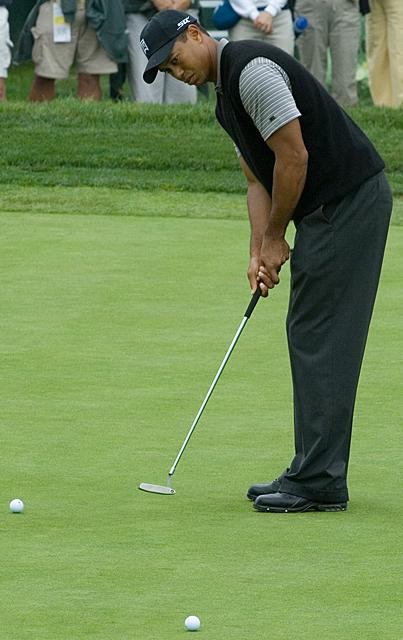
Woods putting at Torrey Pines Golf Course during a practice round at the 2008 U.S. Open

The next phase of Woods's career saw him remain among the top competitors on the tour, but lose his dominating edge. He did not win a major in 2003 or 2004, falling to second in the PGA Tour money list in 2003 and fourth in 2004. Nevertheless, he was named 2003 PGA Player of the Year and PGA Tour Player of the Year after winning two World Golf Championships and finishing fourth at the Open Championship.

In September 2004, his record streak of 264 consecutive weeks as the world's top-ranked golfer ended at the Deutsche Bank Championship, when Vijay Singh won and overtook Woods in the Official World Golf Ranking.

Many commentators were puzzled by Woods's "slump," offering explanations that ranged from his rift with swing coach Butch Harmon to his engagement and marriage. At the same time, he let it be known that he was again working on changes to his swing, this time in hopes of reducing the wear and tear on his surgically repaired left knee, which was subjected to severe stress in the 1998–2003 version of his swing. Again, he anticipated that once the adjustments were complete, he would return to his previous form. Woods changed coaches, working with Hank Haney after leaving Harmon.

== 2005–2007: Resurgence ==
In the 2005 season, Woods quickly returned to his winning ways. He won the Buick Invitational in January, and in March he outplayed Phil Mickelson to win the Ford Championship at Doral and temporarily return to the Official World Golf Ranking number one position (Singh displaced him once again two weeks later). In April, he finally broke his "drought" in the majors by winning the 2005 Masters Tournament in a playoff, which regained him the number one spot in the World Rankings. Singh and Woods swapped the #1 position several times over the next couple of months, but by early July Woods had reclaimed the top spot, propelled further by a victory at the 2005 Open Championship, his 10th major. He went on to win six official money events on the PGA Tour in 2005, topping the money list for the sixth time in his career. His 2005 wins also included two at the World Golf Championships.

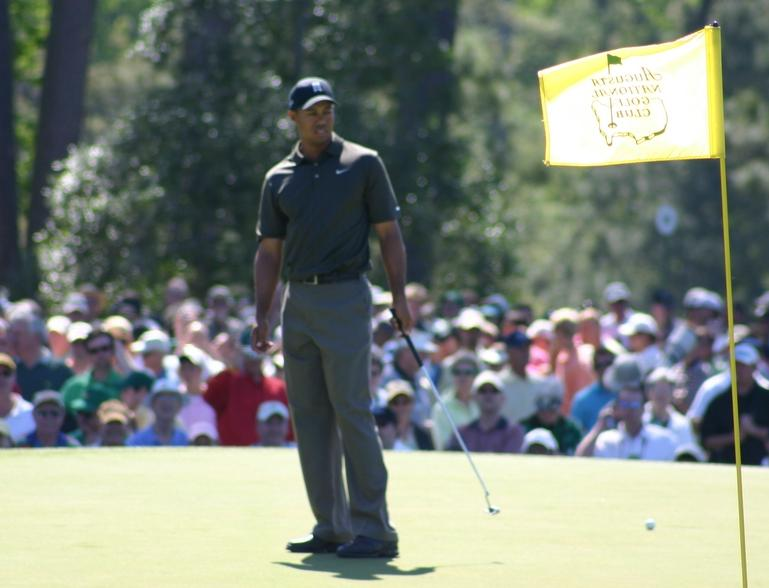
Woods on the green at The Masters in 2006.

For Woods, the year 2006 was markedly different from 2005. While he began just as dominantly (winning the first two PGA tournaments he entered on the year) and was in the hunt for his fifth Masters championship in April, he never mounted a Sunday charge to defend his title, allowing Phil Mickelson to claim the green jacket.

== Death of father ==
On May 3, 2006, Woods's father, mentor and inspiration, Earl, died at age 74 after a lengthy battle with prostate cancer. Woods took a nine-week hiatus from the PGA Tour to be with his family. When he returned for the 2006 U.S. Open, the rust was evident—he missed the cut at Winged Foot, the first time he had missed the cut at a major as a professional, and ended his record-tying streak of 39 consecutive cuts made at majors. Still, a tie for second at the Western Open just three weeks later showed him poised to defend his Open Championship crown at Hoylake.

== Returns to top form ==
At the 2006 Open Championship, Woods almost exclusively used long irons off the tee (he hit driver only one time the entire week—the 16th hole of the first round), he missed just four fairways all week (hitting the fairway 92% of the time), and his score of −18 to par (three eagles, 19 birdies, 43 pars, and seven bogeys) was just one off of his major championship record −19, set at St Andrews in 2000 (since eclipsed by Jason Day). The victory was an emotional one for Woods, who dedicated his play to his father's memory.

Four weeks later at the 2006 PGA Championship, Woods again won in dominating fashion, making only three bogeys, tying the record for fewest in a major. He finished the tournament at 18-under-par, equaling the to-par record in the PGA that he shares with Bob May from 2000 (since eclipsed by Jason Day). In August 2006, he won his 50th professional tournament at the Buick Open—and at the age of thirty years and seven months, he became the youngest golfer to do so. He ended the year by winning six consecutive PGA Tour events, and won the three most prestigious awards given by the PGA Tour (Jack Nicklaus, Arnold Palmer, and Byron Nelson Awards) in the same year for a record seventh time.

At the close of his first 11 seasons, Woods's 54 wins and 12 major wins had surpassed the all-time eleven-season PGA Tour total win record of 51 (set by Byron Nelson) and total majors record of 11 (set by Jack Nicklaus). He was named Associated Press Male Athlete of the Year for a record-tying fourth time.

Woods and tennis star Roger Federer, who share a major sponsor, first met at the 2006 U.S. Open tennis final. Since then, they have attended each other's events and have voiced their mutual appreciation for each other's talents.

Woods began 2007 with a two-stroke victory at the Buick Invitational for his third straight win at the event and his seventh consecutive win on the PGA Tour. The victory marked the fifth time he had won his first tournament of the season. With this win, he became the third man (after Jack Nicklaus and Sam Snead) to win at least five times in three different events on the PGA Tour (his two other events are the WGC-Bridgestone Invitational and WGC-CA Championship). He earned his second victory of the year at the WGC-CA Championship for his third consecutive and sixth overall win at the event. With this victory, he became the first player to have three consecutive victories in five different events.

At the 2007 Masters Tournament, Woods was in the final group on the last day of a major for the thirteenth time in his career, but unlike the previous twelve occasions, he was unable to come away with the win. He finished tied for second two strokes behind winner Zach Johnson.

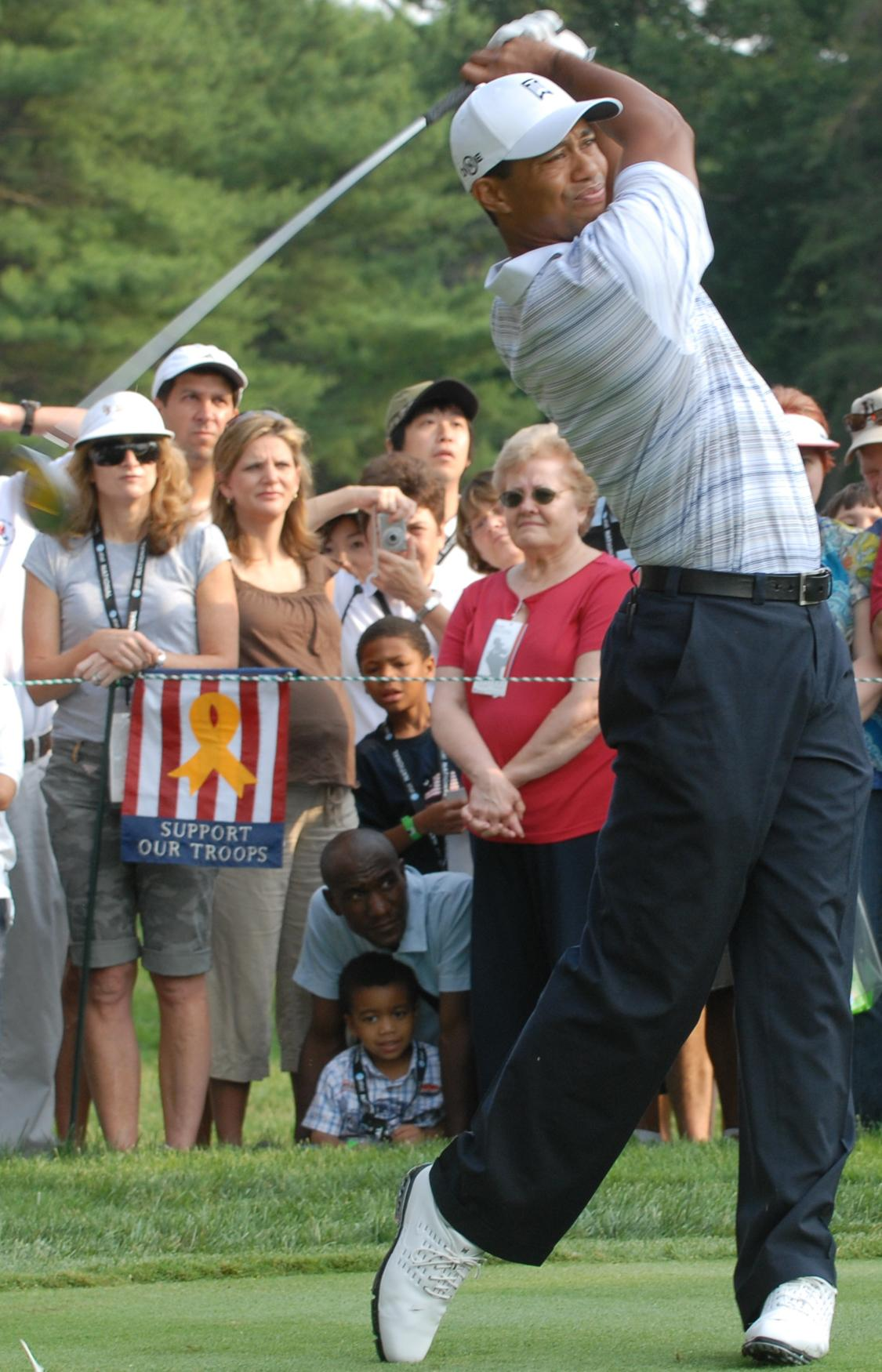
Tiger Woods drives the ball down range at the inaugural Earl Woods Memorial Pro-Am Tournament, part of the AT&T National PGA Tour event, July 2007.

Woods earned his third victory of the season by two strokes at the Wachovia Championship, the 24th different PGA Tour tournament he won. He has collected at least three wins in a season nine times in his 12-year career. At the U.S. Open, he was in the final group for the fourth consecutive major championship, but began the day two strokes back and finished tied for second once again. His streak of never having come from behind to win on the final day of a major continued.

In search of a record-tying fourth consecutive Open Championship, Woods fell out of contention with a second-round 75, and never mounted a charge over the weekend. Although his putting was solid (he sank a 90-footer in the first round), his iron play held him back. "I wasn't hitting the ball as close as I needed to all week," he said, after he finished tied for twelfth, five strokes off the pace.

In early August, Woods won his record 14th World Golf Championships event at the WGC-Bridgestone Invitational by 8 strokes for his third consecutive and sixth victory overall at the event. He became the first golfer to win the same event three straight times on two different occasions (1999–2001) and (2005–2007). The following week, he won his second straight PGA Championship by defeating Woody Austin by two strokes. He became the first golfer to win the PGA Championship in back-to-back seasons on two different occasions: 1999–2000 and 2006–2007. He became the second golfer, after Sam Snead, to have won at least five events on the PGA Tour in eight different seasons.

Woods earned his 60th PGA Tour victory at the BMW Championship by shooting a course record 63 in the final round to win by two strokes. He sank a fifty-foot putt in the final round and missed only two fairways on the weekend. He led the field in most birdies for the tournament, and ranked in the top five in driving accuracy, driving distance, putts per round, putts per green, and greens in regulation. Woods finished his 2007 season with a runaway victory at the Tour Championship to capture his fourth title in his last five starts of the year. He became the only two-time winner of the event, and the champion of the inaugural FedEx Cup. In his 16 starts on Tour in 2007, his adjusted scoring average was 67.79, matching his own record set in 2000. His substantial leads over the second, third, and fourth players were similar in 2000 (1.46 (Phil Mickelson), 1.52 (Ernie Els), 1.66 (David Duval)) and 2007 (1.50 (Els), 1.51 (Justin Rose), 1.60 (Steve Stricker)).

== 2008: Injury-shortened season ==
Woods started the 2008 season with an eight-stroke victory at the Buick Invitational. The win marked his 62nd PGA Tour victory, tying him with Arnold Palmer for fourth on the all-time list. This marked his sixth victory at the event, the sixth time he has begun the PGA Tour season with a victory, and his third PGA Tour win in a row. The following week, he was trailing by four strokes going into the final round of the Dubai Desert Classic, but made six birdies on the back nine for a dramatic one-stroke victory. He took home his 15th World Golf Championships event at the Accenture Match Play Championship with a record-breaking 8 & 7 victory in the final.

In his next event, the Arnold Palmer Invitational, Woods got off to a slow start, finishing the first round at even par and tied for 34th place. After finishing the third round in a five-way tie for first place, he completed his fifth consecutive PGA Tour victory with a dramatic 24-foot (7.3 m) putt on the 18th hole to defeat Bart Bryant by a stroke. It was also his fifth career victory in this event. Geoff Ogilvy stopped Woods's run at the WGC-CA Championship, a tournament Woods had won in each of the previous three years. He remains the only golfer to have had more than one streak of at least five straight wins on the PGA Tour.

Despite bold predictions that Woods might again challenge for the Grand Slam, he did not mount a serious charge at the 2008 Masters Tournament, struggling with his putter through each round. He would still finish alone in second, three strokes behind the champion, Trevor Immelman. On April 15, 2008, he underwent his third left knee arthroscopic surgery in Park City, Utah, and missed two months on the PGA Tour. The first surgery he had was in 1994, when he had a benign tumor removed, and the second in December 2002. He was named Men's Fitness's Fittest Athlete in the June/July 2008 issue.

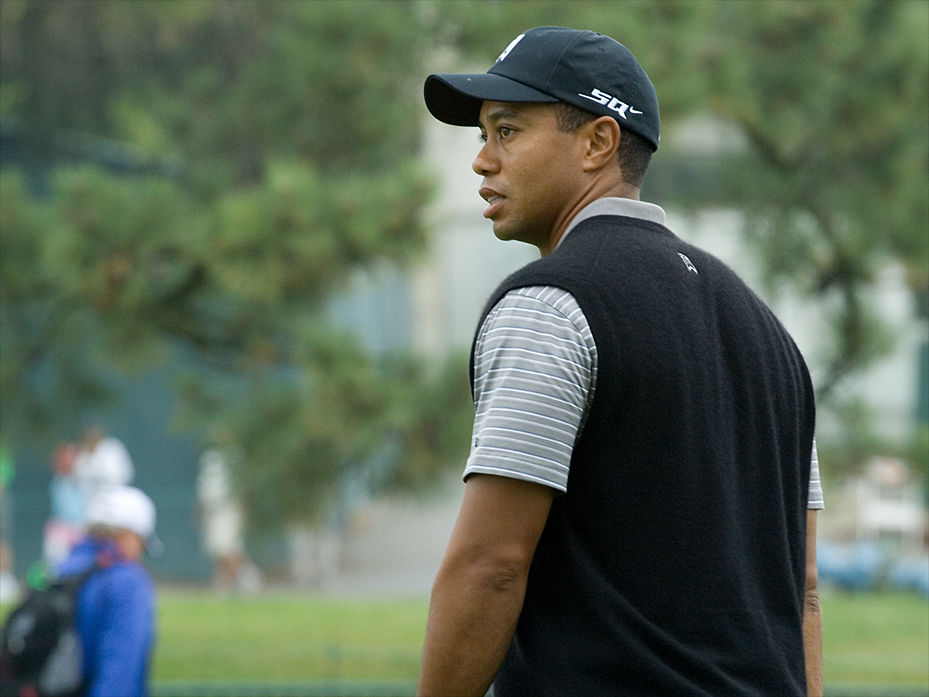
Tiger Woods walks off the 8th green at Torrey Pines during a practice round at the 2008 U.S. Open

Woods returned for the 2008 U.S. Open in one of the most anticipated golf groupings in history including Woods, Phil Mickelson and Adam Scott, the top three golfers in the world. Woods struggled the first day, notching a double bogey on his first hole. He would end the round at +1 (72), four shots off the lead. He scored −3 (68) his second day, still paired with Mickelson, managing 5 birdies, 1 eagle and 4 bogeys. On the third day of the tournament, he began with a double bogey once again and was trailing by five shots with six holes to play. However, he finished the round by making two eagle putts, a combined 100 feet (30 m) in length, and a chip-in birdie to take a one-shot lead into the final round. His final putt assured that he would be in the final group for the sixth time in the last eight major championships.

On Sunday, June 15, Woods began the day with another double bogey, and trailed Rocco Mediate by one stroke after 71 holes. He winced after several of his tee shots, and sometimes made an effort to keep weight off his left foot. Woods was behind by one stroke when he reached the final hole. Left with a 12-foot (3.7 m) putt for birdie, he sank it to force an 18-hole playoff with Mediate on Monday. Despite leading by as many as three strokes at one point in the playoff, Woods again dropped back and needed to birdie the 18th to force sudden death with Mediate, and did so. Woods made par on the first sudden-death hole; Mediate subsequently missed his par putt, giving Woods his 14th major championship. After the tournament, Mediate said "This guy does things that are just not normal by any stretch of the imagination," and Kenny Perry added, "He beat everybody on one leg." His third win in the U.S. Open tied him with Bobby Jones for the career lead in USGA championships won, with nine.

Two days after winning the U.S. Open, Woods announced that he would be required to undergo reconstructive anterior cruciate ligament (ACL) surgery on his left knee and would miss the remainder of the 2008 golf season, including the final two major championships: The Open Championship, and the PGA Championship. Woods also revealed that he had been playing for at least ten months with a torn ligament in his left knee, and sustained a double stress fracture in his left tibia while rehabbing after the surgery he had after the Masters. Publications throughout the world asserted his U.S. Open victory as "epic" and praised his efforts, especially after learning of the extent of his knee injury. Woods called it "My greatest ever championship – the best of the 14 because of all the things that have gone on over the past week."

Woods' absence from the remainder of the season caused PGA Tour television ratings to decline. Overall viewership for the second half of the 2008 season saw a 46.8% decline as compared to 2007.

== 2009: Returning to the PGA Tour ==
Called "one of the most anticipated returns in sports" by the Associated Press, Woods' first PGA Tour event after an eight-month layoff came at the WGC-Accenture Match Play Championship. He lost to Tim Clark in the second round. His first stroke play event was the WGC-CA Championship at Doral, where he finished 9th (−11). Woods won his first title of the year at the Arnold Palmer Invitational, where he was five strokes behind Sean O'Hair entering the final round. Woods shot a final round 67 and made a 16-foot (4.9 m) birdie putt at the final hole to defeat O'Hair by one stroke. Afterwards, he would continue to perform consistently. At The Masters, he finished sixth, four strokes behind eventual winner Ángel Cabrera. Then, despite having the 18-hole lead at the Quail Hollow Championship, he finished two strokes behind Sean O'Hair. At The Players Championship, he played in the final group on Sunday, but finished eighth.

Woods won his second event of 2009 at the Memorial Tournament. He trailed by four shots after three rounds but shot a final round 65, which included two consecutive birdies to end the tournament. The win was Woods' fourth at the event. Woods won his third event of the 2009 season on July 5 at the AT&T National, an event hosted by Woods himself. However, for the third time going into a 2009 major, Woods failed to capitalize on his preceding win. Instead, at the 2009 Open Championship, played at Turnberry, he missed the cut for only the second time in a major championship since turning professional.

On August 2, Woods captured the Buick Open for his fourth win of the season, with a three-shot victory over three other players. After firing an opening-round 71 that put him in 95th place and outside of the cutline, Woods responded with a second-round 63, nine-under-par, that vaulted him into contention. A third-round 65 put him atop the leaderboard and he coasted to victory with a final-round 69 for a 20-under 268 four-round total. This was his biggest turnaround pro victory to date.

Woods won his 70th career event the following week at the WGC-Bridgestone Invitational. He went head-to-head against Pádraig Harrington on Sunday until the 16th, where Harrington made a triple-bogey-8 on the par-5 hole, and Woods made birdie. Tiger went on to win the event by four strokes over Harrington and Robert Allenby.

At the 2009 PGA Championship, Woods shot a 5-under 67 to take the lead after the first round. He remained leader or co-leader through the second and third rounds. Going into the final round, Woods had a 2-stroke lead at 8-under. However, at the 68th hole, Woods was overtaken for the first time atop the leaderboard by Yang Yong-eun. Yang eventually won the tournament by three strokes over Woods, who finished second. It marked the first time that Woods failed to win a major when leading or co-leading after 54 holes, and the first time he had lost any tournament on American soil when leading by more than one shot. It also meant that Woods would end the year without a major for the first time since 2004.

Woods won his 71st career title at the BMW Championship. The win moved him to first place in the FedEx Cup standings going into the final playoff event. It was his fifth win at the BMW Championship (including three wins as the Western Open) and marked the fifth time he had won an event five or more times in his career on the PGA Tour. Woods finished second at The Tour Championship to capture his second FedEx Cup title.

At the 2009 Presidents Cup, Woods had a spectacular performance, winning all five of his matches at the event. He joined his friend Mark O'Meara, who won all five of his matches at the 1996 Presidents Cup, and Shigeki Maruyama, who accomplished this feat in the 1998 Presidents Cup. In all three instances, their respective teams won the competition. Woods was paired with Steve Stricker for all four partners' rounds of the competition, in foursomes and four-ball. On the first day of foursomes, they won 6 and 4 over the team of Ryo Ishikawa and Geoff Ogilvy. In Friday's match of four-ball, they won over the team of Ángel Cabrera and Geoff Ogilvy, 5 and 3. On Saturday, they beat the team of Tim Clark and Mike Weir after trailing for most of the match, by winning the 17th and 18th holes to win 1-up in morning foursomes, and in the afternoon four-ball they defeated the team of Ryo Ishikawa and Y. E. Yang by the score of 4 and 2. In the singles match, Woods was paired with his nemesis from the 2009 PGA Championship, Yang. Yang grabbed the quick 1-up lead on the first hole, but on the third hole lost the lead and Woods went on to win the match by a score of 6 and 5. In addition, Woods clinched the Cup for the United States, which was the first time ever in his career he had the honor and opportunity to do this in a team event competition.

In November 2009, Woods was paid $3.3 million to play in the JBWere Masters, held at Kingston Heath in Melbourne, Australia from November 12 to 15. The event was sold out for the first time. He went on to win at 14 under par, two strokes over Australian Greg Chalmers, marking his 38th European Tour win and his first win on the PGA Tour of Australasia.

== 2010: Turbulent, winless season ==
After his past marital infidelities became known, with massive worldwide media coverage which would eventually last for several months, Woods announced an indefinite break from competitive golf at the end of 2009. He apologized for his behaviour at a news conference held at PGA Tour headquarters on Feb. 19; the statement received live network coverage. In March 2010, he announced that he would be playing in the 2010 Masters.

Missing the start of the 2010 season, Woods returned to competition for the 2010 Masters Tournament in Augusta, Georgia, starting on April 8, 2010, after a break lasting nearly 20 weeks. He began with a 4-under-par round of 68, his best ever start at the Masters, and remained in contention until nearly the end of the fourth day, eventually finishing the tournament tied for fourth. Woods next competed at the 2010 Quail Hollow Championship at the end of April, but missed the cut for just the sixth time of his career. He shot his second-worst round as a professional on April 30, a 7-over 79 during the second round to miss the 36-hole cut by eight strokes. Woods withdrew from The Players Championship during the fourth round, on May 9, later citing a neck injury. He had scored 70-71-71 in the first three rounds, and was two over par for the round, while playing the seventh hole, when he withdrew. Hank Haney, who had coached Woods since 2003, issued a statement resigning as his coach shortly after The Players Championship.

Woods returned to competitive golf four weeks later to defend his title at the Memorial Tournament. He made the cut and went on to finish T19, his worst finish in that tournament since 2002. His next competitive tournament began June 17 at the U.S. Open held at Pebble Beach, the site of his 2000 win by a record 15 shots. After a relatively unspectacular performance through the first two rounds, Woods showed signs of his pre-2010 form, as he managed a back nine 31 en route to shooting a five-under-par 66 on Saturday, which would tie for the low round of the tournament and put him back into contention. However, he was unable to mount a charge on Sunday, despite the collapse of 54-hole leader Dustin Johnson, and went on to finish the tournament at three-over-par and in a tie for fourth place, repeating his top-5 result at the 2010 Masters Tournament.

Woods then played in the AT&T National in late June, which he had formerly hosted, before AT&T dropped his personal sponsorship. He was the defending champion, and the favorite among many, but he struggled all four days of the tournament, failed to post a round under par, and tied for 46th place.

Woods then flew to Ireland to play in a two-day charity event, the JP McManus Pro-Am, and then flew home to Florida to "see his kids", before preparing for The Open Championship just over a week later. He changed his putter for the Open Championship at St Andrews Old Course, saying he always struggled on slow greens and needed this new Nike Method 001 putter to "get the ball rolling faster and better". This was a somewhat surprising statement, considering he had won the previous two Open Championships held at St Andrews, in 2000 and 2005. It was the first time Woods had used any other putter than his Titleist Scotty Cameron since 1999. Woods putted well the first day of the tournament, shooting a 5-under 67, but wind gusts of over 40 mph suspended play for 66 minutes the next day at St Andrews, and Woods was never able to get anything going. It was the same story Saturday. He repeatedly missed short putts. He changed his putter back to his old Scotty Cameron for the final round, but did not putt any better. Woods finished 3-under overall, 13 shots behind winner Louis Oosthuizen (tied for 23rd place).

Woods finished in 18-over par, tying for 78th place (second-to-last place) in the WGC-Bridgestone Invitational on August 8. He posted his worst four-round result as a professional golfer.

Woods began working with Canadian golf coach Sean Foley in August 2010; the two had been discussing a possible partnership for several previous weeks. In the 2010 PGA Championship, played at Whistling Straits in Wisconsin, Woods made the 36-hole cut but failed to mount a challenge, ending in a tie for 28th place.

Woods's inconsistent play in the 2010 FedEx Cup playoffs failed to qualify him into the top 30 players for The Tour Championship, for the first time since he turned professional in 1996. He had won the FedEx Cup in 2007 and 2009. He also failed to qualify on points for the 2010 Ryder Cup team, for the first time in his career. But captain Corey Pavin chose Woods as one of his four captain's picks. Woods, again partnering with Steve Stricker in pairs play, played inconsistently in terrible weather conditions at Celtic Manor in Wales; the matches were delayed several times when the course became unplayable, and the format had to be significantly modified and then even extended to a fourth day to complete the event. The U.S., entering as Cup holders, lost the Cup to the European team, by the narrowest possible margin, 14.5 to 13.5. However, Woods played impressive golf in his final-day singles match, winning decisively over Francesco Molinari.

Woods then took an extended break from competition, to refine new techniques with Foley. He returned in early November, after more than a month off, at the WGC-HSBC Champions event in Shanghai, where he had placed 2nd in 2009, but failed to challenge seriously. Next was a visit to Thailand, his mother's birthplace, for a one-day Skins Game, honoring King Bhumibol. At the 2010 JBWere Masters, held near Melbourne, Australia in mid-November, Woods arrived as defending champion and was paid an appearance fee of more than $3 million. He charged late on the final day to finish in fourth place. Over his final six holes, Woods made two eagles, two birdies, and two pars, to end with a round of 6-under 65. Three weeks later, resuming his role as host of the elite-field Chevron World Challenge near Los Angeles (he had skipped the 2009 event because of personal crisis; the tournament serves as a primary benefactor of his charitable foundation), Woods put up three straight rounds in the 60s, and led going into the final round for the first time in 2010. But he struggled with his long-game control in mixed weather conditions on Sunday, and putted much worse than he had in previous rounds, winding up in a tie with Graeme McDowell after 72 holes. McDowell sank a 20-foot (6.1 m) birdie putt on the final green; Woods then sank his own short birdie putt to tie. McDowell again made birdie on the first playoff hole (the 18th) from 20 feet (6.1 m) to take the title, when Woods missed from shorter range. The playoff loss meant that Woods went winless for an entire season, for the first time since turning professional. However, Woods finished the 2010 season ranked #2 in the world. He again used the Nike Method 003 putter for his final two events of 2010.

== 2011: Work in progress ==
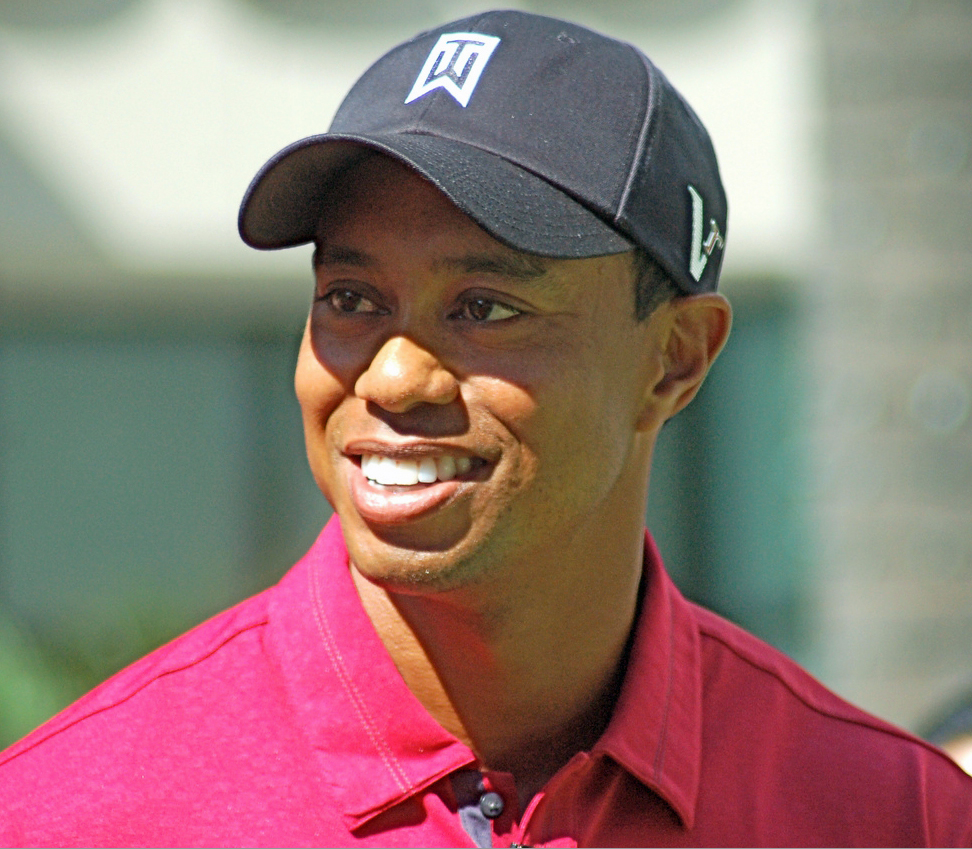
Woods at a charity event in October 2011

Woods opened his 2011 season at the Farmers Insurance Open at Torrey Pines Golf Course near San Diego. He has enjoyed tremendous success there, with six past Tour titles and a dramatic playoff win in the 2008 U.S. Open, but was making his first appearance at the course since that 2008 major win. Woods played strongly for the first two rounds, scoring 69–69 to sit five strokes behind halfway leader Bill Haas. But on the weekend, many wayward approach shots found greenside bunkers, and Woods was unable to recover sufficiently well to stay in contention. He scored 74–75 to end at one-under-par 287, 15 strokes behind winner Bubba Watson, in a tie for 44th place. It was the worst season-opening performance of his career.

Woods made his next appearance at the Dubai Desert Classic, an event he had previously won twice and always ended inside the top five, in six previous appearances. Woods, ranked #3 in the world, was grouped with #1 Lee Westwood and #2 Martin Kaymer for the first two rounds. Woods started with 71 and scored 6-under 66 in round two to move into contention, and stayed in the hunt with 72 for round three, but struggled on Sunday with 75, to end in a tie for 20th, at 4-under 284, seven shots back of winner Álvaro Quirós. During the final round of that competition, Woods spat on the ground a few feet from the hole, after missing a putt at the 12th green. The incident was shown on televised coverage worldwide. Woods apologized for the incident in which he breached the European Tour's code of conduct; he will be fined an undisclosed sum. Later starters had to play across the area where Woods spat. Sportswriter John Feinstein stated on Golf Channel a few days after the incident that Woods is in fact the most-fined player in the history of the PGA Tour.

Woods made his next appearance at the WGC-Accenture Match Play Championship, a World Golf Championship event for the top 64 players. He was playing in this tournament for the first time since Accenture dropped his personal sponsorship some 14 months earlier. Woods, a three-time champion who has more match wins in the event than any other player, came in as one of the four #1 seeds, but lost in the first round on the first sudden-death hole, the 19th, to Thomas Bjørn, after the two players had tied their 18-hole match. On February 27, Woods had his world ranking drop to #5.

Woods played next in the WGC-Cadillac Championship at Doral's Blue Monster course, where he had never missed the top ten in any event. Woods was never in contention to win, but kept his streak going with a tie for tenth place, scoring 70-74-70-66, for eight-under-par 280, eight shots behind winner Nick Watney. His final round tied for best of the day, and was his lowest 18-hole score on the PGA Tour since the third round of the 2010 U.S. Open. After the final round, Woods commented that he was making good progress on his game with coach Sean Foley, being able to identify and correct faults during his final round at Doral. Woods put a Nike heel-shafted blade putter in play for the final two rounds, replacing his center-shafted Titleist Scotty Cameron blade model; he explained afterward that he had wanted a hotter putter to tackle Doral's grainy greens.

Woods competed in the 2011 Tavistock Cup, a charity interclub team event, held at his home course, Isleworth Country Club, but represented the new club Albany, of the Bahamas, where he is an investor. Woods teamed with Arjun Atwal the first day to post a better-ball score of 64, and shot 69 on his own ball on day two.

Woods next competed in the 2011 Arnold Palmer Invitational, an event he has won six times. Woods showed inconsistent play over the four rounds, carding 73-68-74-72 to finish at one-under-par 287, in a tie for 24th place, seven shots behind winner Martin Laird. His world ranking dropped to #7 the following week, the lowest it has been since the week before the 1997 Masters. Woods contended strongly in the 2011 Masters Tournament, scoring 71-66-74-67 to finish at ten-under 278, in a tie for fourth place, four shots behind winner Charl Schwartzel. His ranking rose to #5.

Woods was sidelined from tournament play until May 12 by two leg injuries incurred in round three of the Masters. He entered the 2011 Players Championship, but withdrew after nine holes of the first round, with a score of +6, as his injuries caused him to limp noticeably. His world rank fell to #15 on June 5, his lowest since early 1997, more than 14 years ago.

On June 6, Woods stated that he would remain with longtime agent Mark Steinberg after the agent's contract was not renewed by the International Management Group. The following day, he announced that he would not be playing in the 2011 U.S. Open, set to begin June 16, due to continued pain in his left Achilles tendon and left anterior cruciate ligament. Woods stated he was very disappointed to be unable to play in the season's second major championship, but that he was listening to his doctors, continuing to work on his recovery, and planning for the long term. Woods also missed the 2011 British Open, still recovering from injury. He fired his longtime caddy Steve Williams following the AT&T National in early July; Williams now caddies for Adam Scott.

Woods returned to tournament play in early August, following a break of 11 weeks, at the WGC-Bridgestone Invitational, where he is a seven-time champion. He had Bryon Bell as caddy; Bell is a childhood friend, former high school golf teammate, and current employee of Tiger Woods Design; Bell had caddied for Woods on several previous occasions, dating back to amateur golf. Woods stated in a pre-tournament press conference that Bell is serving temporarily as his caddie, and that he has yet to make a decision on a permanent replacement for Williams. Woods also stated he is "completely healthy". He tied for 37th place after rounds of 68-70-71-70, as Adam Scott won with a 17-under-par total 263. Woods finished last in the field of 76 players in driving accuracy, hitting only slightly more than 40% of his fairways.

Fred Couples, 2011 Presidents Cup U.S. team captain, stated he would use a captain's pick to select Woods for the team should he not automatically qualify. Woods had his contract discontinued by sponsor Tag Heuer, a luxury Swiss watchmaker, on August 10.

Woods, again with Bell on his bag, missed the cut at the 2011 PGA Championship, held at Atlanta Athletic Club, for the first time in that major and for only the third time in a major championship as a professional. After starting with three birdies and two pars over his first five holes, he collapsed to shoot 77, his highest first-round major score since turning pro in 1996, and followed this up with 73 the second day, to finish at ten-over-par 150, missing the cut by six strokes. He had five holes with double bogey or worse in 36 holes; the only other previous event where he had this was the 2007 Arnold Palmer Invitational. Woods also failed to qualify for the 2011 FedEx Cup playoffs since he is outside the top 125 qualifying point earners.

With the hiring of his new caddie Joe LaCava, Woods competed in the Frys.com Open, part of the PGA Tour Fall Series for the first time in his career, finishing tied for 30th place, ten shots behind the winner, Bryce Molder. In mid-November 2011 Woods rose to 50th in the Official World Golf Ranking, from a low of #58, after finishing third at the Emirates Australian Open, his best result to date in 2011. In addition, Woods made the clinching point at the Presidents Cup when he defeated Aaron Baddeley in their singles match.

Woods broke a career-long winless streak of 107 weeks when he birdied the last two holes to capture his fifth career win in the Chevron World Challenge, by one stroke over Zach Johnson, in early December. The Chevron is an elite-level invitational event with 18 of the world's top players, and benefits the Tiger Woods Foundation; Woods donated his entire prize, $1.2 million, to that charitable organization.

== 2012: Back to form and winning again ==
His 2012 season started at the Abu Dhabi HSBC Golf Championship on the European Tour in late January. For the first two days of play Tiger was grouped with Rory McIlroy and world No.1 Luke Donald. He shot under par rounds of 70 and 69 on Thursday and Friday respectively, which left him in joint 4th place at 5-under par. His low round of the week came on Saturday, shooting a 6-under par 66, giving him the joint lead with England's Robert Rock. Woods struggled on Sunday and couldn't mount a big enough charge, shooting a level par 72 and settling for joint 3rd place. Woods' second tournament of the year came at the AT&T Pebble Beach National Pro-Am in early February which he had not played since 2002. His amateur partner for the week was Dallas Cowboys quarterback Tony Romo. Woods shot solid rounds of 68-68-67 on the first three days, and began Sunday in third place, four shots behind leader Charlie Wi. However, he struggled with his putting and shot a final round 75 while his playing partner Phil Mickelson shot a 64 and won the tournament.

His next tournament was the WGC-Accenture Match Play Championship in Arizona. Woods battled to win his first round match against Gonzalo Fernández-Castaño, 1-up, and then played Nick Watney in the second round. On the 18th hole, Woods had to make birdie to extend the match, however his 5-foot putt missed and he was knocked out of the tournament. Woods commented that his putting was hindered technically and required some work after battling with it throughout the round. The following week Woods teed off at the Honda Classic in Palm Beach Gardens, Florida. Woods commented that he had referred back to putting basics instead of new technique he had been applying. Woods' putting over the first three days of tournament play was noticeably better, but the ball was struggling to fall into the hole. Tiger began the fourth round on 2-under par, 9 shots behind leader Rory McIlroy. After parring the first hole and being delayed by adverse weather, Woods returned and played the remaining 17 holes in 8-under par including two eagles and no bogeys. A birdie-eagle finish set up Woods to possibly claim the title, however McIlroy kept his cool and won the tournament. Tiger finished joint second, and the round also marked his lowest final round score in his PGA Tour career.

Woods played the following week at the WGC-Cadillac Championship in Miami, Florida. Tiger spent the first three days near the top of the leaderboard and shot 72-67-68 to start the fourth round in tied 8th place at 9-under par, 8 shots behind leader Bubba Watson. Woods struggled on the front 9 and shot 2-over par going out. He then began to noticeably limp on the next three holes and went on to withdraw from the tournament with an apparent left leg injury, which was later confirmed as a strain on his left Achilles tendon that had been injured previously at the 2011 Masters Tournament. After a short time off, Woods played in the Tavistock Cup at the Lake Nona Golf and Country Club, representing Team Albany, finishing 4th. The same week, Woods began the Arnold Palmer Invitational. After three rounds of 69, 65 and a 71, he began Sunday in the lead at 11-under par, one shot ahead of Graeme McDowell. Woods remained in the lead throughout the round and shot a 2-under par 70 to claim his seventh win at Bay Hill and also marked his first win on the PGA Tour since the BMW Championship in September 2009. After a week off, he returned to Augusta for the Masters Tournament. Over the four days, Woods was never close to contending the title, and shot rounds of 72-75-72-74 to finish tied 40th. After a 3-week break from competition, Woods traveled to Charlotte, North Carolina, for the Wells Fargo Championship. Although starting positively with a 1-under par 71, Woods' second round of 73 (1-over) derailed his tournament hopes and resulted in him missing his eighth cut as a professional by 1 shot and second in as many years for the tournament. The following week, Woods played The Players Championship. After an opening round of 74 (2-over), he was in threat of missing a second consecutive cut, a first for his professional career, however after a 4-under 68, he was firmly staying in the tournament as well as being in the hunt for the weekend. However, a weekend charge never mounted despite good ball striking and he settled for T40th at 1-under par.

In June, Woods won his 73rd PGA Tour event at the Memorial Tournament. He shot rounds of 70-69-73 to begin on Sunday at 4-under par. He birdied three of his last four holes to shoot 67 and win by two shots over Andrés Romero and Rory Sabbatini, including a chip-in at the par-3 16th. Jack Nicklaus, the tournament's host, said "I don't think under the circumstances I've ever seen a better shot". Fittingly, Woods' 73rd victory also tied Nicklaus' number of PGA Tour victories.

In July 2012, Woods surpassed Nicklaus' total number of PGA Tour wins (73) after winning the AT&T National in Maryland.

== 2013: World Number One again ==
Woods began the year with a win in his first event in late January at the Farmers Insurance Open in San Diego. This was his eighth win as a professional at Torrey Pines (including the 2008 U.S. Open). He took a six-shot lead into the final round and hung on to win by four in a Monday finish caused by fog delays.

Woods next won in early March at the WGC-Cadillac Championship event held at Doral. After shooting an opening round 66, Woods led or shared the lead in every round and won by two strokes over Steve Stricker with a 269 (−19) total. In his next event, Woods won for the eighth time at the Arnold Palmer Invitational at Bay Hill, out-dueling Rickie Fowler in the final round. With this win, Woods reclaimed the number one spot in the Official World Golf Ranking for the first time since late in 2010, taking the spot away from Rory McIlroy. Woods remained number one throughout the remainder of the season.

Though never seriously in contention, Woods finished tied for fourth at the Masters Tournament, won by Adam Scott in a sudden-death playoff over Ángel Cabrera. In his next event, Woods won The Players Championship for the second time. Tied with Woods going to the 71st hole, Sergio García hit two balls in the water surrounding the famous island green essentially handing Woods the tournament. Woods finished far down the leaderboard at the U.S. Open at Merion in June won by Justin Rose. At the Open Championship at Muirfield in July, Woods was in contention but a poor fourth round dropped him into a tie for sixth, five shots behind Phil Mickelson, who won his first Open Championship.

In early August, Woods won the WGC-Bridgestone Invitational at Firestone for the eighth time. A second round 61 propelled Woods to a seven-shot victory, his fifth and final win of the season. Woods finished far down the leaderboard at the PGA Championship at Oak Hill where Jason Dufner won his first major. Despite hurting his back during The Barclays, Woods finished in second place, one shot behind Adam Scott. Woods did not seriously contend in the remaining FedEx Cup playoff events. In his final appearance of the season, Woods went 4–1 and led the U.S. team to a victory over the International team at the Presidents Cup held at Muirfield Village in Ohio.

For the 2013 season, Woods won five PGA Tour tournaments giving him 79 for his career, only three behind Sam Snead's leading all-time total of 82. Woods won the tour's money title for the 10th time and the Vardon Trophy for lowest adjusted scoring average for the 9th time. Woods was named both PGA Player of the Year and PGA Tour Player of the Year for the 11th time.

== 2014–2017: Injury frustration ==
=== 2013–14 season ===
Woods made his first appearance on the 2013–14 PGA Tour at the Farmers Insurance Open. However, for the first time in his career, he missed the cut at the event. A poor showing at the Dubai Desert Classic would follow, before Woods withdrew through injury at the Honda Classic – casting doubt on his participation at the Masters. After being in visible pain throughout the WGC-Cadillac Championship, Woods was forced to withdraw from the Arnold Palmer Invitational. Subsequently, Woods announced that he would miss the Masters Tournament for the first time since 1994 to undergo a microdiscectomy.

Woods returned ahead of schedule at the 2014 Quicken Loans National. However he struggled with every aspect of his game, missing the halfway cut. His next appearance came at the third major of the year – the Open Championship. This took place at Hoylake – location of his 2006 victory. Despite a strong start, Woods faded over the weekend to eventually finish 69th. Woods' back pain was clear to see at the 2014 WGC-Bridgestone Invitational, where he withdrew from the tournament. Against all expectations, Woods made an unexpected appearance just one week later at the final major of the year, competing at the PGA Championship. Woods though would miss the cut. This would mark the end of the season for Woods. During the off-season, Woods split with swing coach Sean Foley.

=== 2014–15 season ===
The injury woes would continue into the 2015 season. Woods missed the cut at the 2015 Waste Management Phoenix Open, with his second round 82 the worst round of his professional career. Woods then withdrew once again from the Farmers Insurance Open, citing back pain. Woods opted to return at the 2015 Masters Tournament. Woods put in a strong showing, eventually finishing 17th. This was as good as it got for Woods in the 2015 season. For the first time in his career, he would miss back-to-back cuts at majors, failing to make the weekend at both the U.S. Open and Open Championship. Woods would once again miss the cut in the final major of the season – the PGA Championship. In a last-ditch bid to make the season-ending playoffs, Woods competed at the Wyndham Championship. Despite a strong showing, Woods placed 10th, missing out on the playoffs. In September, Woods underwent a second microdiscectomy.

=== 2015–16 season ===
Due to the effects of his surgery, Woods missed the 2016 Masters Tournament. Woods revealed he had no "timetable for his return". Woods didn't compete in any events during the 2015–16 PGA Tour season; it was the first time in his professional career that he missed all four major championships.

=== 2016–17 season ===
Woods finally returned to professional golf at the 2016 Hero World Challenge, placing 15th in the 18-man event. After 18 months out, Woods made his return to the PGA Tour at the 2017 Farmers Insurance Open. He missed the cut. The following week, Woods withdrew from the Omega Dubai Desert Classic after an opening round 77, citing back spasms.

Woods had been expected to play several events in 2017 after making his return to the PGA Tour, but after withdrawing in Dubai, he announced that he was pulling out of two PGA Tour events in late February, and stated that he would evaluate his schedule after the Honda Classic. Despite Woods doing 'everything he could' to recover in time for the 2017 Masters, he announced he would not compete at the event.

Woods underwent a fourth back surgery in April 2017, two weeks after the Masters and subsequently missed the rest of the season, the second time in his professional career that he did not compete in any of the four major championships. In the aftermath of the surgery, Woods stated he remained 'optimistic' of a return to professional golf. However at the 2017 Presidents Cup, where Woods was a vice-captain for Team USA, he admitted he might not ever play professional golf again. Yet in late October, Woods announced his intention to play at the 2017 Hero World Challenge. At this limited-field event, Woods entered the week ranked 1,199th in the Official World Golf Ranking, and Woods produced a positive performance, finishing tied for ninth.

== 2018: "The Comeback" ==
Woods stated that he would make his first appearance of the 2018 PGA Tour at the Farmers Insurance Open in San Diego, California, an event he had previously won seven times. Woods finished in a tie for 23rd, 7 strokes behind winner Jason Day. In February, Woods appeared in back-to-back PGA Tour events for the first time since August 2015. Woods missed the halfway cut at the Genesis Open in Los Angeles, before finishing 12th in at the Honda Classic in Palm Beach Gardens, Florida. Woods finished tied for second at the Valspar Championship on March 11 which was his best finish on Tour since The Northern Trust in August 2013. He then finished in a tie for 5th the next week at the Arnold Palmer Invitational.

Woods competed at the 2018 Masters Tournament, thus entering a major championship for the first time since 2015. He eventually finished tied for 32nd, which moved him up to 88th in the World Rankings meaning that he returned to the top 100 of the World Rankings for the first time since early 2015.

Three weeks later, Woods appeared at the Wells Fargo Championship, where he finished tied for 55th. He then appeared at The Players Championship for the first time since 2015, where he finished tied for 11th. Woods completed his preparation for the U.S. Open by appearing at the Memorial Tournament, where he finished tied for 23rd.

At the 2018 U.S. Open, Woods missed the cut by three strokes. Woods played next at the Quicken Loans National, where he finished tied for fourth.

Woods impressed at the 2018 Open Championship. After a steady first two rounds, Woods rallied in the third round to get into contention for a first major championship victory since 2008. In the final round, Woods temporarily held the sole lead of the tournament, only to see his challenge ultimately fall short. Woods finished tied for sixth, his best finish in a major since 2013.

Woods next teed it up at the 2018 WGC-Bridgestone Invitational - an event he had won eight times previously. After a positive start, Woods faded over the weekend, eventually finishing tied for 31st.

At the 2018 PGA Championship, Woods started off on Thursday morning with a bogey-double bogey start, before grinding his way to an even par 70. During the second round that was played over both Friday and Saturday due to weather, Woods shot a strong 66 to make his first cut in the PGA Championship since 2013. Woods shot a 66 on Saturday to head into the final round 4 strokes back of Brooks Koepka. Not hitting a single fairway on his opening nine, Woods made the turn in 3 under par before ultimately shooting a 6-under 64, his best ever final round in a major championship. Capping it off with a 19-foot birdie putt on 18, Woods was greeted with large standing ovation from the St. Louis crowd as he walked the bridge over to the scoring trailer. He would ultimately finish in solo 2nd, two strokes back of Koepka, Woods' best finish in a major championship since the 2009 PGA Championship.

Woods' impressive season secured his qualification for the 2018 FedEx Cup Playoffs. He appeared at the Northern Trust Open, where he finished tied for 40th. Woods played a week later at the Dell Technologies Championship, where he finished tied for 24th. Woods then recorded his seventh top-10 finish of the season at the BMW Championship, where he finished 6th.

Woods qualified for the season-ending Tour Championship in 20th place for the FedEx Cup. At the Tour Championship, Woods produced a spectacular performance throughout the tournament, including 6 birdies in the front nine of the third round that propelled him to 12-under-par with a 3-shot lead entering the final round. Neither FedEx Cup leader Justin Rose nor playing partner Rory McIlroy were able to close the gap on Sunday, and towards the end of the tournament Woods was actually in contention to win the FedEx Cup outright when Rose dropped 3 shots on the back nine – however, Rose was able to hole a crucial birdie on the final hole to secure the FedEx Cup title. Still, Woods was joined by thousands of fans on his walk up to the 18th green after his second shot – the crowds were so overwhelming that Woods described himself as "holding back tears" during the walk. After a bunker shot and a two-putt for par, Woods ended a five-year victory drought with a win by two shots. This was Woods' 80th PGA Tour victory, leaving him just two short of Sam Snead's overall record.

Woods rounded off 2018 by appearing in two unofficial events. First, he competed against Phil Mickelson in a head-to-head match play event, with a purse of $9 million. Following a tie through 18 holes, Mickelson eventually won in a playoff at the 22nd hole. Woods then hosted the Hero World Challenge, where he finished tied for 17th.

== 2019: Masters Glory ==
Woods made his first appearance of the 2019 PGA Tour season at the Farmers Insurance Open. At this event, Woods finished tied for 20th. His next appearance came at the Genesis Open, where Woods placed tied for 15th. Woods next played at the 2019 WGC-Mexico Championship, where he finished tied for 10th.

Woods had planned on next appearing at the Arnold Palmer Invitational. However, a neck strain caused him to withdraw from the event, raising fears of further injury disruption to Woods' career. Woods allayed any such concerns by appearing the following week at the 2019 Players Championship. At this event, Woods finished tied for 30th.

Woods then competed at the 2019 WGC-Dell Technologies Match Play – the first time he had played at this event since 2013. Woods topped his group following victories over Aaron Wise and Patrick Cantlay, albeit losing to Brandt Snedeker. Woods therefore advanced to the last 16, where he defeated Rory McIlroy 2 & 1 in a highly anticipated match. Woods was knocked out at the quarterfinal stage however, losing 1 down to Lucas Bjerregaard.

Woods' next appearance came at the 2019 Masters Tournament – the first major championship of the 2019 season. Woods opened up the tournament with a round of 70, following this up with a 68 to enter the weekend one behind the leaders. Woods made a slow start to his third round, but rallied to a round of 67 to finish the day tied for second, two shots behind leader Francesco Molinari. Woods entered the final round in the last group, aiming for a first major championship since the 2008 U.S. Open. Molinari held on to his lead on the front nine, with Woods at one point falling three shots behind. However, Molinari encountered problems on the back nine. The tide swung in Woods' favor at the 12th hole, with Molinari putting his tee shot in the water and consequently double-bogeying the par-3, while Woods made a par. As Woods' group entered hole 15, Woods was one of five players tied for the lead. Woods birdied the hole to move one shot ahead, while Molinari found the water twice, making a double bogey, before Woods moved two ahead following another birdie at 16. After making par at 17, Woods bogeyed the final hole to complete a round of 70, thus claiming a one-shot victory. This was Woods' 5th Masters Tournament triumph, 15th major championship victory, and his first when trailing after three rounds. The victory put him three shy of Jack Nicklaus' overall record. Woods' victory was also his 81st PGA Tour win, and was lauded by many as the greatest sporting comeback of all time. After the Masters win, Woods rose into the top 10 of the Official World Golf Ranking at number 6. The following day, President Donald Trump announced on Twitter that he would present Woods with the Presidential Medal of Freedom, for his incredible comeback in sports and life, which was awarded to him on May 6, 2019.

At the 2019 PGA Championship, which was moved from August to May effective in 2019, Woods shot a 5-over-par 72–73 over the first two rounds, missing the cut by one stroke. At the end of May, he shot 9-under-par to finish tied for 9th at the Memorial Tournament, a tournament he has won five times.

In June, Woods shot 2-under-par 282 to finish tied for 21st at the U.S. Open, held at Pebble Beach. At the 2019 Open Championship, Woods shot a 6-over-par 78–70 over Thursday and Friday, missing the cut by five strokes.

Woods' next tournament was at The Northern Trust, the first tournament of the FedEx Cup playoffs. Citing a mild oblique strain, he withdrew after shooting a 4-over-par 75 in the first round. At the BMW Championship the next week, he finished tied for 37th at 7-under-par, 18 strokes behind the winner, Justin Thomas. With that finish, Woods failed to qualify for the Tour Championship.

== 2019–2020: 82nd win ==
Coming off minor knee surgery in late August, Woods played his first event of the 2020 PGA Tour season in October 2019 at the inaugural Zozo Championship in Japan. With rounds of 64-64-66-68, he won by three strokes over Hideki Matsuyama. The win gave him 82 wins on the PGA Tour, moving Woods into a tie with Sam Snead for the most career wins on the Tour.

His next event came at the Hero World Challenge. After struggling with some evident rust in round 1, he rebounded with 3 consecutive rounds in the 60s and finished solo fourth. He ended the calendar year by leading the U.S. team to a 16–14 win in the 2019 Presidents Cup. As a playing captain, Woods, won all three matches in which he competed. He concluded the 2019 calendar year in sixth place in the Official World Golf Ranking, his best year-ending result since 2013.

Woods' first appearance in 2020 came at the Farmers Insurance Open – where he finished tied for 9th. Three weeks later, he competed at the Genesis Invitational, but a disappointing weekend performance contributed to a final position of tied 69th.

Woods opted to skip the 2020 WGC-Mexico Championship, stating that he felt he 'wasn't going to be ready' for the event, having played at the Genesis Invitational the previous week. Woods unexpectedly skipped two more events in the following two weeks – The Honda Classic and the Arnold Palmer Invitational; the latter of which he attributed to 'back stiffness'. Having then opted to sit out the Players Championship, fears grew that Woods may be unable to defend his Masters title.

However, due to the COVID-19 pandemic, The Players Championship was cancelled after one round and the PGA Tour entered a three-month hiatus, including the postponements or cancellation of all four major championships. Woods, after choosing not to play in the first five tournaments of the revamped schedule, rejoined the Tour at the Memorial Tournament, where he finished tied for 40th at six over par. In the first major of the year, Woods finished the PGA Championship at one under par, tied for 37th.

Woods' next two tournaments were the first two rounds of the FedEx Cup playoffs. At The Northern Trust, he shot 68-71 (three under par) on Thursday and Friday, making the cut by one stroke. Over the weekend, he had rounds of 73 and 66 to finish tied for 58th at six under par. The following week at the BMW Championship, for the first time in ten years Woods shot four rounds over par in a single tournament to finish eleven over par, tied for 51st. Woods finished the season in 63rd place in the FedEx Cup standings.

== 2020–21 season ==
In Woods' first appearance of the 2020-21 PGA Tour, he missed the cut at the rescheduled U.S. Open in mid-September. At the Zozo Championship, which had relocated from the Greater Tokyo Area to Lake Sherwood, California due to the COVID-19 pandemic, Woods finished tied for 72nd. Woods' last tournament of 2020 was The Masters, rescheduled from April to November, where he finished tied for 38th.

He played in the PNC Championship in December, alongside his son Charlie.

On February 23, 2021, Woods was hospitalized in serious but stable condition after a single-car collision and underwent emergency surgery to repair compound fractures sustained in each leg in addition to a shattered ankle. Three months after the accident, in an interview with Golf Digest, Woods did not mention anything about his future as a golfer, but said his primary goal is simply walking under his own power.

== 2021–22 season ==
Woods competed at the 2022 Masters finishing 47th but withdrew from the 2022 PGA Championship after a third round 79 and was cut from the 2022 Open Championship.

== 2026 season ==
From March 2 to 24, 2026, Woods played in 2026 TGL tournament as part of the Jupiter Links team. Woods' team would successfully make the finals after they defeated Boston Commons. On the last day of the tournament, Jupiter Links lost the Finals to the Los Angeles Golf Club.

Following his March 2026 arrest, it was confirmed that Woods now had physical mobility limitations, which were shown when he had to sit down while taking a sobriety test following a car crash that saw his SUV roll over, and was using hydrocodone—a prescription opioid medication which is used to treat severe, chronic pain—on a morning basis. By this time, Woods had 20 leg surgeries and seven back surgeries.

== Cut streak ==
Woods owns the PGA Tour record for consecutive cuts made at 142. The streak started in February 1998 at the Buick Invitational and ended at the Wachovia Championship in May 2005. Woods' tournament previous to the Buick Invitational was the AT&T Pebble Beach National Pro-Am, from which he withdrew after its third and final round was postponed from February to August due to weather. The tournament that ended Woods' streak was the 2005 EDS Byron Nelson Championship, where he missed the cut by one stroke. He beat the previous record of 113, held by Byron Nelson, at The Tour Championship in November 2003.

In both Nelson's and Woods's eras, "making the cut" has been defined as receiving a paycheck. However, in Nelson's day, only players who placed in the top 20 (sometimes as few as 15) in an event won a paycheck, whereas in Woods's day only players who reach a low enough score (top 70 and ties for most events) within the first 36 holes win a paycheck. Several golf analysts argue that Woods did not actually surpass Nelson's consecutive cuts mark, reasoning that 31 of the tournaments in which Woods competed were "no-cut" events, meaning all the players in the field were guaranteed to compete throughout the entire event regardless of their scores through 36 holes (and hence all "made the cut," meaning that they all received a paycheck). These analysts argue that this would leave Woods's final consecutive cuts made at 111, and Nelson's at 113.

However, at least ten of the tournaments in which Nelson played did not have modern-day cuts; that is, all of the players in these events were guaranteed to compete past 36 holes. The Masters, for example, did not institute a 36-hole cut until 1957 (which was well after Nelson retired), the PGA Championship was match play until 1958, and it is unclear whether or not three other events in which Nelson competed had 36-hole cuts. Therefore, these analysts remove "no 36-hole cut" events from both cut streak measures, leaving Nelson's consecutive cuts made at 103 (or possibly less) and Woods's at 111.

In the tournaments in which Nelson competed that did not have 36-hole cuts (that is: the Masters, PGA Championship and the possible three other tournaments), only the top 20 players received a paycheck even though all players in these events were guaranteed to compete past 36 holes. Hence, in these no-cut events, Nelson still placed in the top 20, so Nelson's 113 cuts made are reflective of his 113 top 20 finishes. Woods achieved a top 20 finish 21 consecutive times (from July 2000 to July 2001) and, in the 31 no-cut events in which he played, he won 10 and finished out of the top 10 only five times. Others, including Woods himself, argue that the two streaks cannot be compared, because the variation of tournament structures in the two eras is too great for any meaningful comparison to be made.

A more relevant comparison on cut streaks is the 105 consecutive cuts made by Jack Nicklaus between 1970 and 1976, ending at the 1976 World Open. The cut format from that era was virtually identical to the current PGA Tour practice, and most events in Nicklaus' streak, except for the Tournament of Champions (now the SBS Championship), the World Series of Golf (now the WGC-Bridgestone Invitational), and the U.S. Professional Match Play Championship (10 events for Nicklaus) had a cut made after 36 holes.

== Ryder Cup performance ==
Despite his outstanding success on the PGA Tour, Woods had little success in the Ryder Cup early in his career. In his first Ryder Cup in 1997, he earned only 1½ points competing in every match and partnering mostly with Mark O'Meara. Costantino Rocca defeated Woods in his singles match. In 1999, he earned 2 points over every match with a variety of partners. In 2002, he lost both Friday matches, but, partnered with Davis Love III for both of Saturday's matches, won two points for the Americans, and was slated to anchor the Americans for the singles matches, both squads going into Sunday with 8 points. However, after the Europeans took an early lead, his match with Jesper Parnevik was rendered unimportant and they halved the match. In 2004, he was paired with Phil Mickelson on Friday but lost both matches, and only earned one point on Saturday. With the Americans facing a 5–11 deficit, he won the first singles match, but the team was not able to rally. In 2006, he was paired with Jim Furyk for all of the pairs matches, and they won two of their four matches. Woods won his singles match, one of only three Americans to do so that day. Woods missed the 2008 Ryder Cup competition altogether, as he was recovering from reconstructive surgery on his left knee. Despite Woods' absence, the United States team posted its largest margin of victory in the event since 1981. In 2010, Woods had a successful Ryder Cup going 3–1–0. He played all team matches with Steve Stricker and defeated Francesco Molinari 4&3 in his singles match where he made 9 birdies. However, Europe won in a very close match, 14.5 to 13.5. In 2012, paired again with Stricker, both players struggled going 0–3–0 together for the week. For the first time in his career, Woods would sit out a session in the Ryder Cup. He and Stricker were the only Americans who did not have a point going into the Sunday singles. In his singles match against Francesco Molinari, Woods was 1 up on the 18th fairway. After seeing Martin Kaymer clinch the Ryder Cup for Europe, Woods conceded the hole after missing his par putt. He would halve the match giving Europe the outright victory, and finish his week at 0–3–1. In 2018, Woods was initially named a vice-captain by Jim Furyk. Despite only playing half as many events as his peers, Woods still finished 11th in the final standings and was subsequently chosen as a captain's pick. Paired with Patrick Reed for the two four-ball sessions, they lost each time to Tommy Fleetwood and Francesco Molinari, who went 4–0 together for team Europe, with Molinari going 5–0 at the event. In his Saturday afternoon foursome match, he again lost to the European duo, paired this time with Bryson DeChambeau. Woods would also go on to lose his singles match to Jon Rahm 2&1 to mark the first time in his career that he lost every match he played in one Ryder Cup tournament. Europe would defeat United States by a score of 17.5 to 10.5. In the 8 Ryder Cups that Woods competed in from 1997 to 2018, he won 14.5 points from a possible 37.
