= Valhalla Golf Club =

Golf Club in Louisville, Kentucky

- Location in the United States
- 38.242°N 85.472°W

Club information
- Location: 15503 Shelbyville Road, Louisville, Kentucky
- Elevation: 620 feet (190 m)
- Established: 1986; 40 years ago
- Type: Private
- Owner: Valhalla Golf Partners, LLC
- Total holes: 18
- Tournaments: PGA Championship (1996, 2000, 2014, 2024); Ryder Cup (2008); Senior PGA Championship (2004, 2011)
- Website: valhallagolfclub.com
- Designed by: Jack Nicklaus
- Par: 71
- Length: 7,458 yards (6,820 m)
- Course rating: 76.4
- Slope rating: 148
- Course record: 62: Xander Schauffele & Shane Lowry (2024)

Statue of Jack Nicklaus and Dwight Gahm by Zenos Frudakis at Valhalla in 2008

Valhalla Golf Club, located in Louisville, Kentucky, is a private golf club designed by Jack Nicklaus, opened in 1986.

In 1992, Valhalla was selected to host the 1996 edition of the PGA Championship, one of golf's four majors. The following year (1993), the PGA of America purchased a 25% interest in the club. After the championship in 1996, the PGA of America raised its stake to 50% and announced that the event would return to Valhalla in 2000. At its conclusion, the PGA of America exercised an option to purchase the remaining interest in the club. Later that year, it announced that the Ryder Cup would be held at Valhalla in 2008.

Valhalla also hosted the PGA Club Professional Championship in 2002 and the Senior PGA Championship in 2004.

In 2009, the PGA of America announced that the Senior PGA Championship and the PGA Championship would return to Valhalla in 2011 and 2014, respectively. In November 2017, the PGA of America announced that the PGA Championship would return to Valhalla in 2024.

On June 1, 2022, the club and the PGA of America jointly announced that the club had been sold to a group of club members led by Jimmy Kirchdorfer, CEO of locally based piping supplier ISCO Industries. Other group members include former Yum! Brands CEO David Novak, businessman and former NBA player Junior Bridgeman, and hotelier Chester Musselman.

The course sits on a 486-acre (2.0 km^{2}) property just north of Shelbyville Road (US 60) in the eastern portion of Louisville just outside the Gene Snyder Freeway (I-265). It was envisioned by local business leader Dwight Gahm (pronounced "game") and his three sons in 1981, and opened five years later.

== Major tournaments hosted ==
Mark Brooks won the 1996 PGA Championship in a playoff, winning his only major with a birdie on the first extra hole, the par-5 18th. Franklin native Kenny Perry was the runner-up in the event's final sudden-death playoff. Four years later, the 2000 PGA Championship also went to a playoff; Tiger Woods won by one stroke over Bob May in the revised three-hole format. Woods had a 3-4-5=12 to May's 4-4-5=13 on the course's final three holes. It was Woods' second consecutive PGA Championship, his fifth major title and his third of his eventual "Tiger Slam" of four consecutive major titles – the PGA Championship was preceded by the 2000 U.S. Open at Pebble Beach and the 2000 Open Championship at the Old Course at St Andrews and then followed by the 2001 Masters at Augusta National.) Valhalla hosted its third PGA Championship in 2014, when Rory McIlroy beat Phil Mickelson also by one stroke. Beforehand, the course had undergone a major "modernization" after it hosted the Senior PGA Championship in 2011, which included the rebuilding of all 18 greens.

In addition, Valhalla hosted the Ryder Cup in 2008, with the United States defeating Europe 16½ to 11½ for the first U.S. win since their comeback victory in 1999 at The Country Club in Brookline, Massachusetts. Perry and another native Kentuckian—J. B. Holmes of Campbellsville, who made the team as one of American captain Paul Azinger's four picks—were part of the victorious Team USA and accounted for a combined five points.

The club hosted the 2024 PGA Championship, marking the fourth as host site for that major. Later that year, it was announced as the venue for the 2028 Solheim Cup, making it just the fourth course after The Greenbrier, Muirfield Village and the Gleneagles Hotel's PGA Centenary to host both the Ryder and Solheim Cups.

Year	Tournament	Winner	Winning Score		Margin of Victory	Runner(s) Up	Winner's Share ($)
Year	Tournament	Winner	Total	To Par	Margin of Victory	Runner(s) Up	Winner's Share ($)
1996	PGA Championship	(United States) Mark Brooks	277	–11	Playoff	(United States) Kenny Perry	430,000
2000	PGA Championship	(United States) Tiger Woods	270	–18	Playoff	(United States) Bob May	900,000
2004	Senior PGA Championship	(United States) Hale Irwin	276	–8	1 stroke	(United States) Jay Haas	360,000
2008	Ryder Cup	United States	16^{1/2} to 11^{1/2}			Europe	N/A
2011	Senior PGA Championship	(United States) Tom Watson	278	–10	Playoff	(United States) David Eger	360,000
2014	PGA Championship	(Northern Ireland) Rory McIlroy	268	–16	1 stroke	(United States) Phil Mickelson	1,800,000
2024	PGA Championship	(United States) Xander Schauffele	263	–21	1 stroke	(United States) Bryson DeChambeau	3,300,000
2028	Solheim Cup						N/A

== Scorecard ==
Course setup for the 2024 PGA Championship

Hole	Name	Yards	Par	Hole	Name	Yards	Par
1	The Post	484	4	10	Big Red	590	5
2	Winning Colors	500	4	11	Holler	211	3
3	Honest Abe	208	3	12	Sting Like A Bee	494	4
4	Mine That Bird	372	4	13	The Limestone Hole	351	4
5	The Sun Shines Bright	463	4	14	On The Rocks	254	3
6	Long Shot	495	4	15	Julep	435	4
7	Genuine Risk	597	5	16	Homestretch	508	4
8	Float Like A Butterfly	190	3	17	Straight Up	472	4
9	Twin Spires	415	4	18	Photo Finish	570	5
Out		3,724	35	In		3,885	36
Source:				Total		7,609	71

Valhalla Golf Club
Tee	Rating/Slope	1	2	3	4	5	6	7	8	9	Out	10	11	12	13	14	15	16	17	18	In	Total
Gold	76.4 / 148	495	530	210	375	460	495	600	190	415	3,770	595	210	490	355	255	435	515	475	575	3,905	7,675
Black	74.1 / 143	415	500	200	350	405	475	505	175	410	3,430	555	200	445	350	215	410	440	430	540	3,585	7,015
Green	71.6 / 138	390	475	170	325	400	450	500	160	385	3,255	520	190	420	325	165	380	400	390	480	3,270	6,525
Blue	69.8 / 129	345	455	160	300	380	420	490	150	400	3,100	475	165	385	285	155	350	355	360	440	2,970	6,070
SI	Men's	13	9	11	15	3	1	5	17	7		6	16	2	14	18	10	4	8	12
Par		4	5	3	4	4	4	5	3	4	36	5	3	4	4	3	4	4	4	5	36	72
SI	Ladies'	11	5	15	17	9	1	3	13	7		6	16	2	14	18	12	4	10	8
Silver	70.8 / 124	310	410	115	205	305	340	460	130	295	2,570	410	150	330	210	135	290	315	280	395	2,515	5,085

== See also ==
- Sports in Louisville, Kentucky
- List of attractions and events in the Louisville metropolitan area
