= 2001 Masters Tournament =

American professional golf tournament

- Front cover of the 2001 Masters Journal

Tournament information
- Dates: April 5–8, 2001
- Location: Augusta, Georgia; 33.503°N 82.020°W
- Course: Augusta National Golf Club
- Organized by: Augusta National Golf Club
- Tours: PGA Tour; European Tour; Japan Golf Tour

Statistics
- Par: 72
- Length: 6,985 yards (6,387 m)
- Field: 93 players, 47 after cut
- Cut: 145 (+1)
- Prize fund: US$5,600,000
- Winner's share: $1,008,000

Champion
- (United States) Tiger Woods
- 272 (−16)

Location map
- Location in the United States Location in Georgia

The 2001 Masters Tournament was the 65th Masters Tournament, held April 5–8 at Augusta National Golf Club in Augusta, Georgia. Tiger Woods won his second Masters and sixth major championship, two strokes ahead of runner-up David Duval.

This championship marked the completion of the "Tiger Slam," with Woods holding all four major titles, having won the U.S. Open, Open Championship, and PGA Championship in 2000. In addition to the four majors, he was also the reigning champion of the Players Championship (March) and the WGC-NEC Invitational (August, second of three consecutive).

This was the first major to award a seven-figure winner's share; the first major with a six-figure winner's share was the 1983 PGA Championship.

== Course ==
Hole	Name	Yards	Par	Hole	Name	Yards	Par
1	Tea Olive	410	4	10	Camellia	485	4
2	Pink Dogwood	575	5	11	White Dogwood	455	4
3	Flowering Peach	350	4	12	Golden Bell	155	3
4	Flowering Crab Apple	205	3	13	Azalea	485	5
5	Magnolia	435	4	14	Chinese Fir	405	4
6	Juniper	180	3	15	Firethorn	500	5
7	Pampas	365	4	16	Redbud	170	3
8	Yellow Jasmine	550	5	17	Nandina	425	4
9	Carolina Cherry	430	4	18	Holly	405	4
Out		3,500	36	In		3,485	36
Source:				Total		6,985	72

== Field ==
1. Masters champions

Tommy Aaron, Seve Ballesteros, Gay Brewer, Billy Casper, Charles Coody, Fred Couples (10,16,17), Ben Crenshaw, Nick Faldo (11), Raymond Floyd, Doug Ford, Bernhard Langer, Sandy Lyle, Larry Mize, Jack Nicklaus, José María Olazábal (12,16,17), Mark O'Meara (3), Arnold Palmer, Gary Player, Vijay Singh (4,11,14,16,17), Craig Stadler, Tom Watson, Tiger Woods (2,3,4,5,10,11,12,13,14,16,17), Ian Woosnam, Fuzzy Zoeller

- George Archer, Jack Burke Jr., Bob Goalby, Herman Keiser, Byron Nelson, Sam Snead, and Art Wall Jr. did not play.

2. U.S. Open champions (last five years)

Ernie Els (10,11,13,14,16,17), Lee Janzen, Steve Jones

3. The Open champions (last five years)

Paul Lawrie, Tom Lehman (10,13,14,16,17), Justin Leonard (14,16,17)

4. PGA champions (last five years)

Mark Brooks, Davis Love III (10,14,15,16,17)

5. The Players Championship winners (last three years)

David Duval (10,11,14,16,17), Hal Sutton (10,14,16,17)

6. U.S. Amateur champion and runner-up

James Driscoll (a), Jeff Quinney (a)

7. The Amateur champion

Mikko Ilonen (a)

8. U.S. Amateur Public Links champion

D. J. Trahan (a)

9. U.S. Mid-Amateur champion

Greg Puga (a)

10. Top 16 players and ties from the 2000 Masters

Carlos Franco (14,16,17), Jim Furyk (14,16,17), John Huston (11,14,16,17), Phil Mickelson (14,16,17), Greg Norman (16,17), Dennis Paulson (17), Chris Perry (14,16,17), Nick Price (14,16,17), Loren Roberts (11,14,16,17)

11. Top eight players and ties from the 2000 U.S. Open

Stewart Cink (14,16,17), Pádraig Harrington (16,17), Miguel Ángel Jiménez (16,17)

- Lee Westwood (16,17) did not play.

12. Top four players and ties from 2000 PGA Championship

Stuart Appleby (14,16,17), Thomas Bjørn (13,16,17), Greg Chalmers, Bob May (14,16,17)

13. Top four players and ties from the 2000 Open Championship

David Toms (14,16,17)

14. Top 40 players from the 2000 PGA Tour money list

Robert Allenby (16,17), Paul Azinger (16,17), Notah Begay III (16,17), Mark Calcavecchia (16,17), Chris DiMarco, Steve Flesch (16,17), Scott Hoch (16), Jonathan Kaye, Franklin Langham, Steve Lowery, Jeff Maggert (16), Shigeki Maruyama (16), Rocco Mediate (16,17), Jesper Parnevik (16,17), Rory Sabbatini, Tom Scherrer, Kirk Triplett (16,17), Scott Verplank (16,17), Grant Waite, Duffy Waldorf (16,17), Mike Weir (16,17)

15. Top 3 players from the 2001 PGA Tour money list on March 4

Joe Durant, Steve Stricker (17)

16. Top 50 players from the final 2000 world ranking

Ángel Cabrera (17), Michael Campbell (17), Darren Clarke (17), José Cóceres, Pierre Fulke (17), Sergio García (17), Retief Goosen (17), Dudley Hart (17), Colin Montgomerie (17), Eduardo Romero (17)

17. Top 50 players from world ranking published March 4

Brad Faxon, Toshimitsu Izawa

18. Special foreign invitation

Aaron Baddeley, Shingo Katayama

All the amateurs were playing in their first Masters, as were Greg Chalmers, José Cóceres, Chris DiMarco, Steve Flesch, Pierre Fulke, Toshimitsu Izawa, Shingo Katayama, Jonathan Kaye, Franklin Langham, Bob May, Eduardo Romero, Rory Sabbatini, and Tom Scherrer. Aaron Baddeley made his first appearance as a professional.

== Round summaries ==
=== First round ===
Thursday, April 5, 2001

The round was headlined by the tournament-low 65 (−7) shot by Chris DiMarco, which gave him a one stroke lead after day one in his Masters debut. Steve Stricker and Ángel Cabrera shot six-under 66s to tie for second. Three players (John Huston, Phil Mickelson, Lee Janzen) formed a tie for fourth at 67. The scoring was very good throughout the leaderboard as 14 players shot in the 60s on day one and 32 players were in red figures. Tiger Woods, looking to win all four major championships in a row in two different calendar years, shot a two-under 70 to put him in a six-way tie for 15th. Defending champion Vijay Singh shot a 69 (−3).

Place	Player	Score	To par
1	(United States) Chris DiMarco	65	−7
T2	(Argentina) Ángel Cabrera	66	−6
T2	(United States) Steve Stricker	66	−6
T4	(United States) John Huston	67	−5
T4	(United States) Lee Janzen	67	−5
T4	(United States) Phil Mickelson	67	−5
T7	(United States) James Driscoll (a)	68	−4
T7	(Spain) Miguel Ángel Jiménez	68	−4
T7	(United States) Chris Perry	68	−4
T7	(United States) Kirk Triplett	68	−4

=== Second round ===
Friday, April 6, 2001

Chris DiMarco added to his one-stroke first round lead with a 69 (-3) to give him a two-stroke lead at 134 (-10) after 36-holes. However, the round was headlined by the owner of last three major championships; Tiger Woods bolted up the leaderboard into a tie for second place with a 66 (-6). Phil Mickelson shot a 69 to equal Woods in second place. David Duval who was looking for his first Masters championship after three straight top 10 finishes at Augusta matched Woods's 66, and put himself among five golfers tied for fourth at 137 (-7), which included two-time U.S. Open champion, Lee Janzen. Two-time champion José María Olazábal was among a three-way tie for ninth at 138 (-6). The cut was set at 145 (+1), with notable players Sergio García, Davis Love III, and Thomas Bjørn off for the weekend.

Place	Player	Score	To par
1	(United States) Chris DiMarco	65-69=134	−10
T2	(United States) Phil Mickelson	67-69=136	−8
T2	(United States) Tiger Woods	70-66=136	−8
T4	(Argentina) Ángel Cabrera	66-71=137	−7
T4	(United States) David Duval	71-66=137	−7
T4	(Japan) Toshimitsu Izawa	71-66=137	−7
T4	(United States) Lee Janzen	67-70=137	−7
T4	(United States) Steve Stricker	66-71=137	−7
T9	(United States) Mark Calcavecchia	72-66=138	−6
T9	(Spain) José María Olazábal	70-68=138	−6
T9	(United States) Kirk Triplett	68-70=138	−6

Amateurs: Driscoll (+2), Ilonen (+7), Trahan (+9), Puga (+12), Quinney (+12).

=== Third round ===
Saturday, April 7, 2001

Tiger Woods had his second straight round in the 60s, with a four-under 68, to take the 54-hole lead at -12, and to move within 18 holes of winning all four majors in a row. Phil Mickelson put himself in the best position to foil Tiger's quest with a three-under 69 to trail by only one stroke going to the final round. The leader of the first two rounds, Chris DiMarco shot an even par 72 to fall into third place. The 1989 British Open champion, Mark Calcavecchia, shot a four-under 68 to tie DiMarco for third. Ernie Els, also shot a four-under 68, to move up the leaderboard to -9 and a tie for fifth place. Rocco Mediate shot the round of the day with a six-under 66 to put himself at -8 and a tie for eighth place. At the close of the round 31 players were under par for the championship.

Place	Player	Score	To par
1	(United States) Tiger Woods	70-66-68=204	−12
2	(United States) Phil Mickelson	67-69-69=205	−11
T3	(United States) Mark Calcavecchia	72-66-68=206	−10
T3	(United States) Chris DiMarco	65-69-72=206	−10
T5	(Argentina) Ángel Cabrera	66-71-70=207	−9
T5	(United States) David Duval	71-66-70=207	−9
T5	(South Africa) Ernie Els	71-68-68=207	−9
T8	(United States) Rocco Mediate	72-70-66=208	−8
T8	(United States) Kirk Triplett	68-70-70=208	−8
T10	(United States) Brad Faxon	73-68-68=209	−7
T10	(United States) Lee Janzen	67-70-72=209	−7
T10	(Spain) José María Olazábal	70-68-71=209	−7
T10	(United States) Steve Stricker	66-71-72=209	−7

=== Final round ===
Sunday, April 8, 2001

==== Summary ====
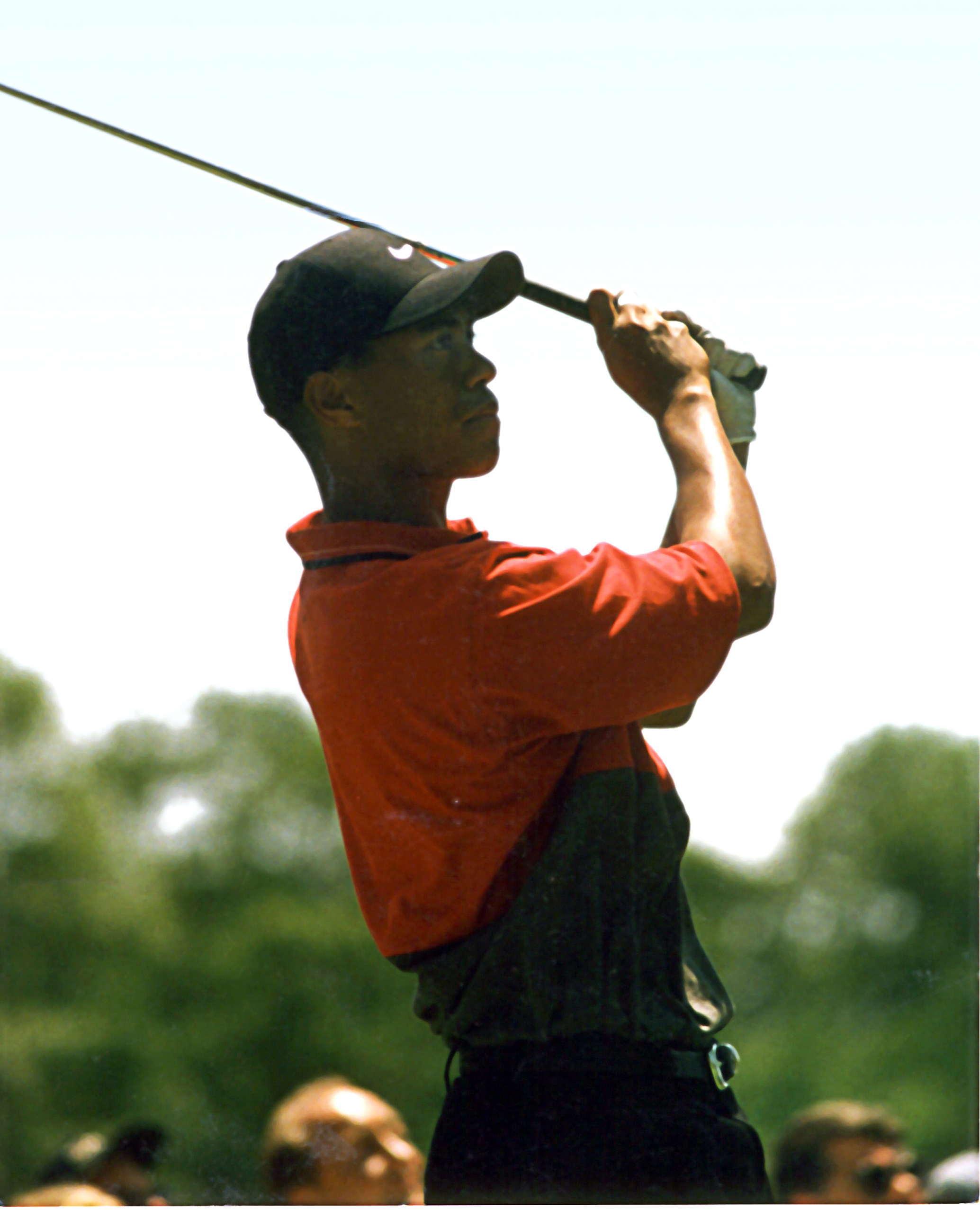
Tiger Woods won his second Masters title

External videos
- Full final round coverage on CBS on YouTube

For the first time in the modern era a golfer was able to win all four of golf's major championships in a row. However, since they were all not won in the same calendar year, the feat was dubbed the Tiger Slam. Only Bobby Jones, in 1930, under a different major championship structure was able to win all four in the same year. Woods shot his third straight round in the 60s with his second consecutive four-under 68 to complete the tournament at -16. The only golfer to make a serious charge at Woods was David Duval who matched the round of the day with a five-under 67. Duval briefly tied for the lead when he birdied the par 5 15th. Unfortunately for him, Duval would give the shot right back on the par 3 16th. Needing a birdie on the final hole, Duval missed a birdie-putt to allow Woods to only need to par the final hole. For good measure, Woods would birdie the hole to win his second green jacket and sixth major championship. It was another hard luck finish for Duval, who finished in the top 10 for the fourth consecutive Masters and it was his second, second-place finish.

Phil Mickelson was briefly in contention on the back nine, but was not able to match Woods and Duval with a two-under 70 for the round. It was another disappointing major for Mickelson who earned his 12th top 10 finish, but was still without a major championship. Japan's Toshimitsu Izawa matched Duval's round of the day with a 67 of his own to finish in a tie for fourth with Mark Calcavecchia at -10. Two-time Masters champion, Bernhard Langer, was among a four-way tie for sixth at -9 that also included two-time U.S. Open champion, Ernie Els. The leader of the first two rounds, Chris DiMarco, shot a two-over 74 to finish a disappointing tie for tenth.

==== Final leaderboard ====
Champion
(a) = amateur
(c) = past champion

Top 10
Place	Player	Score	To par	Money (US$)
1	(United States) Tiger Woods (c)	70-66-68-68=272	−16	1,008,000
2	(United States) David Duval	71-66-70-67=274	−14	604,800
3	(United States) Phil Mickelson	67-69-69-70=275	−13	380,800
T4	(United States) Mark Calcavecchia	72-66-68-72=278	−10	246,400
T4	(Japan) Toshimitsu Izawa	71-66-74-67=278	−10	246,400
T6	(South Africa) Ernie Els	71-68-68-72=279	−9	181,300
T6	(United States) Jim Furyk	69-71-70-69=279	−9	181,300
T6	(Germany) Bernhard Langer (c)	73-69-68-69=279	−9	181,300
T6	(United States) Kirk Triplett	68-70-70-71=279	−9	181,300
T10	(Argentina) Ángel Cabrera	66-71-70-73=280	−8	128,800
T10	(United States) Chris DiMarco	65-69-72-74=280	−8	128,800
T10	(United States) Brad Faxon	73-68-68-71=280	−8	128,800
T10	(Spain) Miguel Ángel Jiménez	68-72-71-69=280	−8	128,800
T10	(United States) Steve Stricker	66-71-72-71=280	−8	128,800

Leaderboard below the top 10
Place	Player	Score	To par	Money ($)
T15	(United States) Paul Azinger	70-71-71-69=281	−7	95,200
T15	(United States) Rocco Mediate	72-70-66-73=281	−7	95,200
T15	(Spain) José María Olazábal (c)	70-68-71-72=281	−7	95,200
T18	(United States) Tom Lehman	75-68-71-68=282	−6	81,200
T18	(Fiji) Vijay Singh (c)	69-71-73-69=282	−6	81,200
T20	(United States) John Huston	67-75-72-69=283	−5	65,240
T20	(United States) Jeff Maggert	72-70-70-71=283	−5	65,240
T20	(United States) Mark O'Meara (c)	69-74-72-68=283	−5	65,240
T20	(Sweden) Jesper Parnevik	71-71-72-69=283	−5	65,240
24	(Northern Ireland) Darren Clarke	72-67-72-73=284	−4	53,760
25	(United States) Tom Scherrer	71-71-70-73=285	−3	49,280
26	(United States) Fred Couples (c)	74-71-73-68=286	−2	44,800
T27	(Republic of Ireland) Pádraig Harrington	75-69-72-71=287	−1	40,600
T27	(United States) Steve Jones	74-70-72-71=287	−1	40,600
T27	(United States) Justin Leonard	73-71-72-71=287	−1	40,600
T27	(Canada) Mike Weir	74-69-72-72=287	−1	40,600
T31	(Australia) Stuart Appleby	72-70-70-76=288	E	33,208
T31	(United States) Mark Brooks	70-71-77-70=288	E	33,208
T31	(United States) Lee Janzen	67-70-72-79=288	E	33,208
T31	(United States) David Toms	72-72-71-73=288	E	33,208
T31	(United States) Duffy Waldorf	72-70-71-75=288	E	33,208
36	(United States) Hal Sutton	74-69-71-75=289	+1	28,840
T37	(United States) Scott Hoch	74-70-72-74=290	+2	26,320
T37	(United States) Chris Perry	68-74-74-74=290	+2	26,320
T37	(United States) Loren Roberts	71-74-73-72=290	+2	26,320
T40	(Japan) Shingo Katayama	75-70-73-74=292	+4	22,960
T40	(United States) Franklin Langham	72-73-75-72=292	+4	22,960
T40	(United States) Steve Lowery	72-72-78-70=292	+4	22,960
T43	(United States) Dudley Hart	74-70-78-71=293	+5	19,600
T43	(United States) Jonathan Kaye	74-71-74-74=293	+5	19,600
T43	(United States) Bob May	71-74-73-75=293	+5	19,600
46	(Paraguay) Carlos Franco	71-71-77-75=294	+6	17,360
47	(Australia) Robert Allenby	71-74-75-75=295	+7	16,240
CUT	(United States) Notah Begay III	73-73=146	+2	
CUT	(Denmark) Thomas Bjørn	70-76=146	+2	
CUT	(Argentina) José Cóceres	77-69=146	+2	
CUT	(United States) James Driscoll (a)	68-78=146	+2	
CUT	(Spain) Sergio García	70-76=146	+2	
CUT	(United States) Davis Love III	71-75=146	+2	
CUT	(United States) Dennis Paulson	73-73=146	+2	
CUT	(United States) Joe Durant	73-74=147	+3	
CUT	(Scotland) Sandy Lyle (c)	74-73=147	+3	
CUT	(Japan) Shigeki Maruyama	77-70=147	+3	
CUT	(United States) Scott Verplank	69-78=147	+3	
CUT	(Australia) Greg Chalmers	76-72=148	+4	
CUT	(United States) Larry Mize (c)	74-74=148	+4	
CUT	(United States) Jack Nicklaus (c)	73-75=148	+4	
CUT	(Zimbabwe) Nick Price	73-75=148	+4	
CUT	(Argentina) Eduardo Romero	75-73=148	+4	
CUT	(South Africa) Rory Sabbatini	73-75=148	+4	
CUT	(United States) Tom Watson (c)	78-70=148	+4	
CUT	(Wales) Ian Woosnam (c)	71-77=148	+4	
CUT	(United States) Stewart Cink	75-74=149	+5	
CUT	(South Africa) Retief Goosen	75-74=149	+5	
CUT	(Scotland) Paul Lawrie	73-76=149	+5	
CUT	(Scotland) Colin Montgomerie	73-76=149	+5	
CUT	(South Africa) Gary Player (c)	73-76=149	+5	
CUT	(United States) Fuzzy Zoeller (c)	77-72=149	+5	
CUT	(Australia) Aaron Baddeley	75-75=150	+6	
CUT	(United States) Steve Flesch	74-76=150	+6	
CUT	(New Zealand) Grant Waite	79-71=150	+6	
CUT	(England) Nick Faldo (c)	75-76=151	+7	
CUT	(United States) Raymond Floyd (c)	76-75=151	+7	
CUT	(Finland) Mikko Ilonen (a)	72-79=151	+7	
CUT	(Spain) Seve Ballesteros (c)	76-76=152	+8	
CUT	(United States) Charles Coody (c)	80-72=152	+8	
CUT	(Sweden) Pierre Fulke	73-79=152	+8	
CUT	(United States) Craig Stadler (c)	79-73=152	+8	
CUT	(New Zealand) Michael Campbell	78-75=153	+9	
CUT	(Australia) Greg Norman	71-82=153	+9	
CUT	(United States) D. J. Trahan (a)	78-75=153	+9	
CUT	(United States) Greg Puga (a)	76-80=156	+12	
CUT	(United States) Jeff Quinney (a)	80-76=156	+12	
CUT	(United States) Arnold Palmer (c)	82-76=158	+14	
CUT	(United States) Ben Crenshaw (c)	81-78=159	+15	
CUT	(United States) Tommy Aaron (c)	81-82=163	+19	
CUT	(United States) Billy Casper (c)	87-80=167	+23	
WD	(United States) Gay Brewer (c)	84	+12	
WD	(United States) Doug Ford (c)			

==== Scorecard ====
Hole	1	2	3	4	5	6	7	8	9	10	11	12	13	14	15	16	17	18
Par	4	5	4	3	4	3	4	5	4	4	4	3	5	4	5	3	4	4
(United States) Woods	−11	−12	−12	−12	−12	−12	−13	−14	−14	−14	−15	−14	−15	−15	−15	−15	−15	−16
(United States) Duval	−8	−9	−10	−9	−10	−11	−12	−13	−13	−14	−14	−14	−14	−14	−15	−14	−14	−14
(United States) Mickelson	−11	−12	−12	−11	−12	−11	−12	−13	−13	−13	−12	−12	−13	−13	−14	−13	−13	−13
(United States) Calcavecchia	−11	−11	−11	−10	−9	−9	−10	−11	−11	−11	−11	−11	−10	−9	−9	−9	−9	−10
(Japan) Izawa	−5	−5	−5	−5	−6	−6	−7	−8	−8	−8	−8	−7	−7	−7	−9	−10	−10	−10
(South Africa) Els	−9	−9	−9	−9	−8	−8	−8	−8	−8	−9	−8	−8	−9	−9	−10	−10	−9	−9
(United States) Furyk	−7	−8	−8	−8	−8	−9	−10	−10	−10	−10	−10	−9	−10	−10	−11	−10	−9	−9
(Germany) Langer	−7	−7	−6	−7	−6	−6	−6	−5	−6	−5	−5	−5	−6	−7	−8	−8	−9	−9
(United States) Triplett	−8	−8	−7	−7	−7	−6	−7	−8	−9	−9	−9	−9	−10	−9	−9	−9	−9	−9
(United States) DiMarco	−9	−10	−9	−9	−9	−9	−8	−9	−8	−8	−8	−8	−7	−6	−6	−7	−7	−8

Cumulative tournament scores, relative to par

Eagle	Birdie	Bogey

== Notes ==
This was the final Masters for former champions Gay Brewer (age 69), Billy Casper (69), and Doug Ford (78). Because of consistent poor performances, they were asked not to participate in 2002.
