= Franklin Langham =

American professional golfer (born 1968)

Personal information
- Nationality: United States
- Born: May 8, 1968 (age 58) Thomson, Georgia, U.S.
- Height: 6 ft 1 in (1.85 m)
- Weight: 175 lb (79 kg; 12.5 st)

Career
- Sport: Golf
- College: University of Georgia
- Turned professional: 1992
- Former tours: PGA Tour; Nationwide Tour; NGA Hooters Tour
- Professional wins: 9
- Highest ranking: 51 (September 24, 2000)

Number of wins by tour
- Korn Ferry Tour: 3
- Other: 6

Best results in major championships
- Masters Tournament: T40: 2001
- PGA Championship: 7th: 2000
- U.S. Open: T37: 2002
- The Open Championship: DNP

Franklin Langham (born May 8, 1968) is an American professional golfer.

== Early life and amateur career ==
Langham was born in Thomson, Georgia. He played golf at the University of Georgia from 1989 to 1991 and was named an All-American in 1991. He played on the 1991 Walker Cup team.

== Professional career ==
Langham played on the PGA Tour in 1996, 1998-2002 and 2005 and on the Nationwide Tour in 1993–95, 1997, 2003–04 and 2006–08. He has three victories on the Nationwide Tour and has had finished runner-up on four occasions in PGA Tour events. He best finish on the PGA Tour money list was 26th in 2000. His best finish at a major was 7th place at the 2000 PGA Championship.

The 2008 season saw Langham's final year on the Nationwide Tour.

== Professional wins (9) ==
=== Nationwide Tour wins (3) ===
No.	Date	Tournament	Winning score	Margin of victory	Runner-up
1	Aug 8, 1993	Nike Permian Basin Open	−14 (67-66-69=202)	Playoff	(United States) Doug Martin
2	Apr 25, 2004	Rheem Classic	−15 (67-61-71-66=265)	2 strokes	(United States) Keoke Cotner
3	Sep 9, 2007	Utah EnergySolutions Championship	−20 (63-67-66-68=264)	2 strokes	(Wales) Richard Johnson

Nationwide Tour playoff record (1–3)

No.	Year	Tournament	Opponent(s)	Result
1	1993	Nike Permian Basin Open	(United States) Doug Martin	Won with birdie on second extra hole
2	1995	Nike Mississippi Gulf Coast Classic	(United States) Allen Doyle	Lost to par on second extra hole
3	1995	Nike Utah Classic	(Canada) Glen Hnatiuk, (United States) Harry Rudolph	Hnatiuk won with birdie on first extra hole
4	1995	Nike Tri-Cities Open	(United States) Jeff Gove	Lost to birdie on second extra hole

=== NGA Hooters Tour wins (4) ===
No.	Date	Tournament	Winning score	Margin of victory	Runner(s)-up
1	Jun 7, 1992	Douglas Golf Classic	−18 (70-68-66-66=270)	Playoff	(United States) Perry Moss
2	Aug 2, 1992	Fore and Aft Marine Classic	−17 (65-68-66-64=263)	3 strokes	(United States) Marion Dantzler
3	Mar 9, 1997	Applebee's Classic	E (73-70-72-73=288)	Playoff	(United States) Zoran Zorkic
4	Mar 16, 1997	Honda Classic	−7 (72-69-73-67=281)	1 stroke	(United States) Kevin Blanton, (United States) Steve Ford

=== Other wins (2) ===
- 1989 Georgia Open (as an amateur)
- 1992 Georgia Open

== Results in major championships ==
Tournament	2000	2001	2002	2003	2004	2005
Masters Tournament		T40				
U.S. Open		T72	T37			CUT
PGA Championship	7	CUT				

Top 10
Did not play

CUT = missed the half-way cut
"T" = Tied
Note: Langham never played in The Open Championship.

== Results in The Players Championship ==
Tournament	1999	2000	2001
The Players Championship	T32	CUT	T15

CUT = missed the halfway cut
"T" indicates a tie for a place

== Results in World Golf Championships ==
Tournament	2000	2001
Match Play		R64
Championship	T17	NT^{1}
Invitational		

^{1}Cancelled due to 9/11

Did not play

QF, R16, R32, R64 = Round in which player lost in match play
"T" = Tied
NT = No tournament

== U.S. national team appearances ==
Amateur

- Walker Cup: 1991 (winners)

== See also ==
- 1995 Nike Tour graduates
- 1997 PGA Tour Qualifying School graduates
- 2004 Nationwide Tour Graduates
