= 2014 PGA Championship =

Tournament information
- Dates: August 7–10, 2014
- Location: Louisville, Kentucky; 38.242°N 85.472°W
- Course: Valhalla Golf Club
- Organized by: PGA of America
- Tours: PGA Tour; European Tour; Japan Golf Tour

Statistics
- Par: 71
- Length: 7,458 yards (6,820 m)
- Field: 156 players, 74 after cut
- Cut: 143 (+1)
- Prize fund: $10,000,000 €7,478,872
- Winner's share: $1,800,000 €1,346,197

Champion
- (Northern Ireland) Rory McIlroy
- 268 (−16)
- Location in the United States Location in Kentucky

The 2014 PGA Championship was the 96th PGA Championship, played August 7–10 at Valhalla Golf Club in Louisville, Kentucky. This was the third PGA Championship at Valhalla, which previously hosted in 1996 and 2000.

Rory McIlroy won his second PGA Championship and fourth career major title, one stroke ahead of runner-up Phil Mickelson.

== Venue ==
Hole	Name	Yards	Par	Hole	Name	Yards	Par
1	Cut the Corner	446	4	10	Turns	590	5
2	The Ridge	500	4	11	On the Edge	210	3
3	Floyds Fork	205	3	12	Odin's Revenge	467	4
4	Short 'n Sweet	372	4	13	The Island	350	4
5	Fade Away	463	4	14	Two Tears	217	3
6	The Bear	495	4	15	On the Rocks	435	4
7	Players Pick	597	5	16	Down the Stretch	508	4
8	Thor's Hammer	174	3	17	No Mercy	472	4
9	The Rise	415	4	18	Gahm Over	542	5
Out		3,667	35	In		3,791	36
Source:				Total		7,458	71

Previous course lengths for major championships

- 7,167 yards (6,554 m) – par 72, 2000 PGA Championship
- 7,144 yards (6,532 m) – par 72, 1996 PGA Championship

The second hole was previously played as a par 5.

== Field ==
The following qualification criteria were used to select the field. Each player is listed according to the first category by which he qualified with additional categories in which he qualified shown in parentheses.

1. All former PGA Champions

- Rich Beem
- Keegan Bradley (8,9)
- Mark Brooks
- John Daly
- Jason Dufner (6,8,9,10)
- Pádraig Harrington
- Martin Kaymer (2,8,9,10)
- Davis Love III
- Rory McIlroy (2,4,6,8,9,10)
- Shaun Micheel
- Phil Mickelson (3,4,8,9)
- Vijay Singh
- Tiger Woods (8,9)
- Yang Yong-eun
- David Toms (6) withdrew due to a back injury.
- The following former champions did not compete: Paul Azinger, Jack Burke Jr., Steve Elkington, Dow Finsterwald, Raymond Floyd, Doug Ford, Al Geiberger, Wayne Grady, David Graham, Hubert Green, Don January, John Mahaffey, Larry Nelson, Bobby Nichols, Jack Nicklaus, Gary Player, Nick Price, Jeff Sluman, Dave Stockton, Hal Sutton, Lee Trevino, Bob Tway, Lanny Wadkins

2. Last five U.S. Open Champions

- Graeme McDowell (6,8,9)
- Justin Rose (8,9,10)
- Webb Simpson (8,9,10)

3. Last five Masters Champions

- Charl Schwartzel (8)
- Adam Scott (6,8,10)
- Bubba Watson (8,9,10)

4. Last five British Open Champions

- Darren Clarke
- Ernie Els
- Louis Oosthuizen

5. Current Senior PGA Champion

- Colin Montgomerie

6. 15 low scorers and ties in the 2013 PGA Championship

- Jonas Blixt (8)
- Roberto Castro
- Jason Day (8,10)
- Jim Furyk (8,9)
- Zach Johnson (8,9,10)
- Marc Leishman (8)
- Scott Piercy
- Henrik Stenson (8,10)
- Kevin Streelman (8,10)
- Steve Stricker (8,9)
- Marc Warren
- Boo Weekley
- Dustin Johnson (8,9,10) did not play for personal reasons.

7. 20 low scorers in the 2014 PGA Professional National Championship

- Michael Block
- Jamie Broce
- Rob Corcoran
- Stuart Deane
- Frank Esposito Jr.
- Ryan Helminen
- David Hronek
- Johan Kok
- Aaron Krueger
- Jim McGovern
- Dave McNabb
- Brian Norman
- Rod Perry
- Matt Pesta
- Steve Schneiter
- Jerry Smith
- Bob Sowards
- David Tentis
- Dustin Volk
- Eric Williamson

8. Top 70 leaders in official money standings from the 2013 WGC-Bridgestone Invitational to the 2014 RBC Canadian Open

- Jason Bohn
- Steven Bowditch (10)
- Ángel Cabrera (10)
- K. J. Choi
- Tim Clark (10)
- Erik Compton
- Ben Crane (10)
- Brendon de Jonge
- Graham DeLaet (12)
- Luke Donald (9)
- Harris English (10)
- Matt Every (10)
- Rickie Fowler
- Sergio García (9)
- Bill Haas
- Brian Harman (10)
- Russell Henley (10)
- Charley Hoffman
- J. B. Holmes (10)
- Billy Horschel
- Charles Howell III
- Freddie Jacobson (12)
- Matt Jones (10)
- Chris Kirk (10)
- Will MacKenzie
- Hunter Mahan
- Ben Martin (12)
- Hideki Matsuyama (10)
- George McNeill
- Ryan Moore (10)
- Kevin Na
- Noh Seung-yul (10)
- Ryan Palmer
- Ian Poulter (9)
- Patrick Reed (10)
- Rory Sabbatini
- John Senden (10)
- Brandt Snedeker (9)
- Jordan Spieth
- Kevin Stadler (10)
- Brendan Steele
- Chris Stroud
- Brian Stuard
- Daniel Summerhays
- Brendon Todd (10)
- Jimmy Walker (10)
- Nick Watney
- Gary Woodland
- Matt Kuchar (9,10) withdrew with a back injury.

9. Members of the United States and European 2012 Ryder Cup teams (provided they are ranked in the top 100 in the Official World Golf Ranking on July 28)

- Francesco Molinari
- Lee Westwood
- Nicolas Colsaerts (ranked 172), Peter Hanson (119), and Paul Lawrie (215) were not ranked in the top 100.

10. Winners of tournaments co-sponsored or approved by the PGA Tour since the 2013 PGA Championship

- Chesson Hadley
- Geoff Ogilvy
- Scott Stallings

11. Vacancies are filled by the first available player from the list of alternates (those below 70th place in official money standings).

- Scott Brown
- Russell Knox
- Cameron Tringale
- Jason Kokrak

12. The PGA of America reserves the right to invite additional players not included in the categories listed above

- Kiradech Aphibarnrat
- Thomas Bjørn
- Rafa Cabrera-Bello
- Paul Casey
- Kevin Chappell
- Stewart Cink
- George Coetzee
- Jamie Donaldson
- Victor Dubuisson
- Gonzalo Fernández-Castaño
- Ross Fisher
- Tommy Fleetwood
- Stephen Gallacher
- Branden Grace
- David Hearn
- Mikko Ilonen
- Ryo Ishikawa
- Thongchai Jaidee
- Miguel Ángel Jiménez
- Robert Karlsson
- Kim Hyung-sung
- Brooks Koepka
- Anirban Lahiri
- Pablo Larrazábal
- Alexander Lévy
- Shane Lowry
- Joost Luiten
- Matteo Manassero
- Edoardo Molinari
- Koumei Oda
- Thorbjørn Olesen
- Kenny Perry
- Richard Sterne
- Hideto Tanihara
- Tom Watson
- Bernd Wiesberger
- Danny Willett
- Chris Wood
- Fabrizio Zanotti
- Paul McGinley withdrew after a left-shoulder injury.

Alternates (category 11)

1. Jerry Kelly – replaced Dustin Johnson
2. Pat Perez – took spot reserved for WGC-Bridgestone Invitational winner
3. Shawn Stefani – replaced David Toms
4. John Huh – replaced Matt Kuchar

== Round summaries ==
=== First round ===
Thursday, August 7, 2014

Lee Westwood recorded nine birdies, including his last four holes, to offset a double-bogey for a round of 65 (−6) and join Kevin Chappell and Ryan Palmer in a tie for first. Rory McIlroy also rebounded from a double-bogey with four straight birdies on the back nine and was one shot behind. Defending champion Jason Dufner entered the championship with a neck injury and withdrew after ten holes at +8.

Place	Player	Score	To par
T1	(United States) Kevin Chappell	65	−6
T1	(United States) Ryan Palmer	65	−6
T1	(England) Lee Westwood	65	−6
T4	(United States) Jim Furyk	66	−5
T4	(Northern Ireland) Rory McIlroy	66	−5
T4	(Italy) Edoardo Molinari	66	−5
T4	(Sweden) Henrik Stenson	66	−5
T4	(England) Chris Wood	66	−5
T9	(Finland) Mikko Ilonen	67	−4
T9	(United States) Jerry Kelly	67	−4

=== Second round ===
Friday, August 8, 2014

Rory McIlroy, who had regained the world number one spot the previous Monday, held the 36-hole lead. The low round went to Jason Day with a 65.

Place	Player	Score	To par
1	(Northern Ireland) Rory McIlroy	66-67=133	−9
T2	(Australia) Jason Day	69-65=134	−8
T2	(United States) Jim Furyk	66-68=134	−8
T4	(United States) Rickie Fowler	69-66=135	−7
T4	(Finland) Mikko Ilonen	67-68=135	−7
T4	(United States) Ryan Palmer	65-70=135	−7
T7	(United States) Phil Mickelson	69-67=136	−6
T7	(Austria) Bernd Wiesberger	68-68=136	−6
T9	(Canada) Graham DeLaet	69-68=137	−5
T9	(France) Victor Dubuisson	69-68=137	−5
T9	(Netherlands) Joost Luiten	68-69=137	−5
T9	(South Africa) Louis Oosthuizen	70-67=137	−5
T9	(Sweden) Henrik Stenson	66-71=137	−5
T9	(United States) Steve Stricker	69-68=137	−5
T9	(England) Lee Westwood	65-72=137	−5

=== Third round ===
Saturday, August 9, 2014

Rory McIlroy birdied three of his last four holes for a round of 67 (−4). Bernd Wiesberger recorded birdies on his last three holes to record the lowest score of the round with a 65 (−6) and move into second place, one shot behind. A tight leaderboard saw five players tied for the lead at 10-under at one point on the back-nine. The scoring average for the round was 69.6, the lowest in PGA Championship history.

Place	Player	Score	To par
1	(Northern Ireland) Rory McIlroy	66-67-67=200	−13
2	(Austria) Bernd Wiesberger	68-68-65=201	−12
3	(United States) Rickie Fowler	69-66-67=202	−11
T4	(Australia) Jason Day	69-65-69=203	−10
T4	(United States) Phil Mickelson	69-67-67=203	−10
T6	(Finland) Mikko Ilonen	67-68-69=204	−9
T6	(South Africa) Louis Oosthuizen	70-67-67=204	−9
T6	(United States) Ryan Palmer	65-70-69=204	−9
T6	(Sweden) Henrik Stenson	66-71-67=204	−9
T10	(Canada) Graham DeLaet	69-68-68=205	−8
T10	(Wales) Jamie Donaldson	69-70-66=205	−8
T10	(United States) Steve Stricker	69-68-68=205	−8

=== Final round ===
Sunday, August 10, 2014

Finishing the round in almost complete darkness, Rory McIlroy made par on the 18th to win his fourth career and second consecutive major championship. Beginning the round with a one-shot advantage, McIlroy fell from the lead with two bogeys on his first six holes. Rickie Fowler recorded birdies on four out of five holes on the front-nine, Phil Mickelson made four birdies on his first nine while Henrik Stenson made five birdies on the front to each pass McIlroy. Down by as much as three shots, McIlroy jumped back into contention with an eagle at the 10th to get within one shot. Fowler and Stenson both made bogey on the 14th, while Mickelson bogeyed the 16th. McIlroy, meanwhile, birdied the 13th and 17th to get to 16-under-par. Needing eagle on 18 to tie McIlroy, Mickelson's chip from off the green narrowly missed while Fowler missed on a lengthy putt. McIlroy found a greenside bunker at the last then two-putted for par and a one-shot win over Mickelson. With this win McIlroy became the first player since Tiger Woods in 2008 to win three straight starts on the PGA Tour (he previously won the Open Championship and the WGC-Bridgestone Invitational), and the first since Pádraig Harrington to win consecutive majors. Harrington won the same two in 2008, the Open Championship and PGA Championship.

==== Final leaderboard ====
Champion
(c) = past champion

Top 10
Place	Player	Score	To par	Prize money ($)
1	(Northern Ireland) Rory McIlroy (c)	66-67-67-68=268	−16	1,800,000
2	(United States) Phil Mickelson (c)	69-67-67-66=269	−15	1,080,000
T3	(United States) Rickie Fowler	69-66-67-68=270	−14	580,000
T3	(Sweden) Henrik Stenson	66-71-67-66=270	−14	580,000
T5	(United States) Jim Furyk	66-68-72-66=272	−12	367,500
T5	(United States) Ryan Palmer	65-70-69-68=272	−12	367,500
T7	(France) Victor Dubuisson	69-68-70-66=273	−11	263,000
T7	(South Africa) Ernie Els	70-70-68-65=273	−11	263,000
T7	(Finland) Mikko Ilonen	67-68-69-69=273	−11	263,000
T7	(United States) Hunter Mahan	70-71-65-67=273	−11	263,000
T7	(United States) Steve Stricker	69-68-68-68=273	−11	263,000
T7	(United States) Jimmy Walker	69-71-68-65=273	−11	263,000

Leaderboard below the top 10
Place	Player	Score	To par	Money (£)
T13	(United States) Kevin Chappell	65-74-67-68=274	−10	191,000
T13	(United States) Brandt Snedeker	73-68-66-67=274	−10	191,000
T15	(Australia) Jason Day	69-65-69-72=275	−9	127,889
T15	(Canada) Graham DeLaet	69-68-68-70=275	−9	127,889
T15	(United States) Brooks Koepka	71-71-66-67=275	−9	127,889
T15	(South Africa) Louis Oosthuizen	70-67-67-71=275	−9	127,889
T15	(South Africa) Charl Schwartzel	72-68-69-66=275	−9	127,889
T15	(Australia) Adam Scott	71-69-66-69=275	−9	127,889
T15	(Scotland) Marc Warren	71-71-66-67=275	−9	127,889
T15	(England) Lee Westwood	65-72-69-69=275	−9	127,889
T15	(Austria) Bernd Wiesberger	68-68-65-74=275	−9	127,889
T24	(Wales) Jamie Donaldson	69-70-66-71=276	−8	84,000
T24	(England) Justin Rose	70-72-67-67=276	−8	84,000
26	(Netherlands) Joost Luiten	68-69-69-71=277	−7	78,000
T27	(United States) Bill Haas	71-68-68-71=278	−6	71,000
T27	(United States) Jerry Kelly	67-74-70-67=278	−6	71,000
T27	(United States) Kenny Perry	72-69-69-68=278	−6	71,000
T30	(France) Alexander Lévy	69-71-68-71=279	−5	62,000
T30	(Denmark) Thorbjørn Olesen	71-71-70-67=279	−5	62,000
T30	(England) Danny Willett	68-73-66-72=279	−5	62,000
T33	(United States) Daniel Summerhays	70-72-68-70=280	−4	54,500
T33	(United States) Nick Watney	69-69-70-72=280	−4	54,500
T35	(Sweden) Jonas Blixt	71-70-68-72=281	−3	44,920
T35	(Spain) Sergio García	70-72-66-73=281	−3	44,920
T35	(Japan) Hideki Matsuyama	71-72-70-68=281	−3	44,920
T35	(Fiji) Vijay Singh (c)	71-68-73-69=281	−3	44,920
T35	(South Africa) Richard Sterne	70-69-72-70=281	−3	44,920
T40	(United States) Jason Bohn	71-71-71-69=282	−2	33,500
T40	(Zimbabwe) Brendon de Jonge	70-70-72-70=282	−2	33,500
T40	(England) Luke Donald	70-72-68-72=282	−2	33,500
T40	(United States) Brian Harman	71-69-69-73=282	−2	33,500
T40	(United States) Ryan Moore	73-68-67-74=282	−2	33,500
T40	(Japan) Koumei Oda	74-68-71-69=282	−2	33,500
T46	(United States) Scott Brown	71-70-70-72=283	−1	25,375
T46	(South Africa) Branden Grace	73-70-68-72=283	−1	25,375
T46	(Australia) Matt Jones	68-71-72-72=283	−1	25,375
T46	(Sweden) Robert Karlsson	71-69-74-69=283	−1	25,375
T46	(Australia) Marc Leishman	71-71-72-69=283	−1	25,375
T46	(Republic of Ireland) Shane Lowry	68-74-74-67=283	−1	25,375
T46	(Northern Ireland) Graeme McDowell	73-70-71-69=283	−1	25,375
T46	(Italy) Edoardo Molinari	66-73-71-73=283	−1	25,375
T46	(Australia) Geoff Ogilvy	69-71-71-72=283	−1	25,375
T46	(United States) Pat Perez	71-71-71-70=283	−1	25,375
T46	(England) Chris Wood	66-73-70-74=283	−1	25,375
T46	(Paraguay) Fabrizio Zanotti	71-70-71-71=283	−1	25,375
T58	(Spain) Gonzalo Fernández-Castaño	71-70-72-71=284	E	20,850
T58	(United States) Billy Horschel	71-68-69-76=284	E	20,850
T58	(Italy) Francesco Molinari	71-71-71-71=284	E	20,850
T58	(England) Ian Poulter	68-73-71-72=284	E	20,850
T58	(United States) Patrick Reed	70-71-70-73=284	E	20,850
T58	(United States) Brendan Steele	71-70-73-70=284	E	20,850
T64	(United States) J. B. Holmes	68-72-69-78=287	+3	18,950
T64	(United States) Kevin Stadler	71-70-72-74=287	+3	18,950
T64	(United States) Chris Stroud	70-73-73-71=287	+3	18,950
T64	(United States) Bubba Watson	70-72-73-72=287	+3	18,950
68	(United States) Shawn Stefani	68-75-72-73=288	+4	18,400
T69	(Sweden) Freddie Jacobson	72-69-73-75=289	+5	18,033
T69	(United States) Zach Johnson	70-72-70-77=289	+5	18,033
T69	(Scotland) Colin Montgomerie	70-72-72-75=289	+5	18,033
72	(United States) Brendon Todd	70-73-75-75=293	+9	17,800
73	(Spain) Rafa Cabrera-Bello	69-71-74-80=294	+10	17,700
CUT	(South Africa) Tim Clark	70-74=144	+2	
CUT	(United States) Erik Compton	71-73=144	+2	
CUT	(England) Tommy Fleetwood	73-71=144	+2	
CUT	(Republic of Ireland) Pádraig Harrington (c)	73-71=144	+2	
CUT	(United States) Ryan Helminen	73-71=144	+2	
CUT	(United States) Russell Henley	69-75=144	+2	
CUT	(United States) Charley Hoffman	70-74=144	+2	
CUT	(Germany) Martin Kaymer (c)	70-74=144	+2	
CUT	(United States) Scott Piercy	73-71=144	+2	
CUT	(United States) Gary Woodland	72-72=144	+2	
CUT	(United States) Matt Every	73-72=145	+3	
CUT	(Scotland) Russell Knox	75-70=145	+3	
CUT	(South Africa) Johan Kok	78-67=145	+3	
CUT	(India) Anirban Lahiri	72-73=145	+3	
CUT	(United States) Davis Love III (c)	72-73=145	+3	
CUT	(United States) Ben Martin	74-71=145	+3	
CUT	(South Korea) Noh Seung-yul	68-77=145	+3	
CUT	(United States) Kevin Streelman	69-76=145	+3	
CUT	(United States) Brian Stuard	71-74=145	+3	
CUT	(United States) Tom Watson	72-73=145	+3	
CUT	(Australia) Steven Bowditch	74-72=146	+4	
CUT	(United States) Keegan Bradley (c)	74-72=146	+4	
CUT	(United States) Jamie Broce	74-72=146	+4	
CUT	(England) Paul Casey	74-72=146	+4	
CUT	(United States) Roberto Castro	73-73=146	+4	
CUT	(United States) Stuart Deane	75-71=146	+4	
CUT	(United States) Harris English	74-72=146	+4	
CUT	(England) Ross Fisher	73-73=146	+4	
CUT	(Canada) David Hearn	74-72=146	+4	
CUT	(Japan) Ryo Ishikawa	72-74=146	+4	
CUT	(United States) Chris Kirk	74-72=146	+4	
CUT	(United States) Kevin Na	74-72=146	+4	
CUT	(South Africa) Rory Sabbatini	75-71=146	+4	
CUT	(Japan) Hideto Tanihara	74-72=146	+4	
CUT	(South Korea) Yang Yong-eun (c)	75-71=146	+4	
CUT	(United States) Stewart Cink	72-75=147	+5	
CUT	(South Africa) George Coetzee	73-74=147	+5	
CUT	(Scotland) Stephen Gallacher	70-77=147	+5	
CUT	(United States) Chesson Hadley	74-73=147	+5	
CUT	(United States) Charles Howell III	73-74=147	+5	
CUT	(United States) Webb Simpson	73-74=147	+5	
CUT	(United States) Eric Williamson	74-73=147	+5	
CUT	(Northern Ireland) Darren Clarke	79-69=148	+6	
CUT	(United States) John Daly (c)	76-72=148	+6	
CUT	(South Korea) Kim Hyung-sung	73-75=148	+6	
CUT	(Spain) Pablo Larrazábal	79-69=148	+6	
CUT	(United States) George McNeill	73-75=148	+6	
CUT	(United States) Jordan Spieth	71-77=148	+6	
CUT	(United States) Tiger Woods (c)	74-74=148	+6	
CUT	(Spain) Miguel Ángel Jiménez	72-77=149	+7	
CUT	(United States) Rod Perry	74-75=149	+7	
CUT	(Australia) John Senden	75-74=149	+7	
CUT	(United States) Scott Stallings	71-78=149	+7	
CUT	(Denmark) Thomas Bjørn	75-75=150	+8	
CUT	(Thailand) Thongchai Jaidee	71-79=150	+8	
CUT	(United States) Will MacKenzie	76-74=150	+8	
CUT	(United States) Steve Schneiter	72-78=150	+8	
CUT	(United States) Bob Sowards	75-75=150	+8	
CUT	(United States) Michael Block	77-74=151	+9	
CUT	(South Korea) K. J. Choi	72-79=151	+9	
CUT	(United States) John Huh	78-73=151	+9	
CUT	(United States) Jason Kokrak	78-73=151	+9	
CUT	(United States) Shaun Micheel (c)	72-79=151	+9	
CUT	(United States) Brian Norman	78-74=152	+10	
CUT	(United States) Rich Beem (c)	74-79=153	+11	
CUT	(United States) Rob Corcoran	76-77=153	+11	
CUT	(United States) Mark Brooks (c)	78-79=157	+15	
CUT	(Italy) Matteo Manassero	80-77=157	+15	
CUT	(United States) Jim McGovern	83-74=157	+15	
CUT	(United States) Dave McNabb	77-80=157	+15	
CUT	(United States) David Hronek	81-77=158	+16	
CUT	(United States) Jerry Smith	80-78=158	+16	
CUT	(United States) Dave Tentis	79-79=158	+16	
CUT	(United States) Frank Esposito Jr.	83-78=161	+19	
CUT	(United States) Aaron Krueger	84-77=161	+19	
CUT	(United States) Dustin Volk	81-82=163	+21	
CUT	(United States) Matt Pesta	79-89=168	+26	
WD	(Thailand) Kiradech Aphibarnrat	72		
WD	(United States) Ben Crane	74		
WD	(United States) Boo Weekley	80		
WD	(Argentina) Ángel Cabrera	82		
WD	(United States) Jason Dufner (c)			
DQ	(United States) Cameron Tringale (Note: Tringale disqualified himself after realizing he signed an incorrect scorecard.)	69-71-71-69=280	−2	

==== Scorecard ====
Final round

Hole	1	2	3	4	5	6	7	8	9	10	11	12	13	14	15	16	17	18
Par	4	4	3	4	4	4	5	3	4	5	3	4	4	3	4	4	4	5
(Northern Ireland) McIlroy	−13	−13	−12	−12	−12	−11	−12	−12	−12	−14	−14	−14	−15	−15	−15	−15	−16	−16
(United States) Mickelson	−11	−11	−12	−12	−12	−12	−13	−13	−14	−14	−15	−15	−15	−15	−15	−14	−14	−15
(United States) Fowler	−11	−10	−11	−12	−13	−13	−14	−14	−14	−15	−15	−15	−15	−14	−14	−14	−14	−14
(Sweden) Stenson	−10	−10	−11	−11	−12	−12	−13	−13	−14	−14	−14	−14	−15	−14	−14	−14	−14	−14
(United States) Furyk	−7	−8	−8	−9	−9	−9	−9	−9	−9	−10	−10	−10	−10	−10	−10	−11	−11	−12
(United States) Palmer	−10	−10	−10	−10	−9	−8	−9	−9	−9	−11	−10	−11	−11	−11	−11	−11	−11	−12
(Australia) Day	−10	−10	−10	−10	−11	−10	−9	−10	−10	−10	−10	−10	−10	−10	−10	−8	−8	−9
(Austria) Wiesberger	−12	−12	−12	−12	−12	−11	−11	−11	−11	−11	−11	−10	−10	−10	−9	−9	−9	−9

Cumulative tournament scores, relative to par

Eagle	Birdie	Bogey	Double bogey
