= 2000 PGA Championship =

Coordinates: 38.242°N 85.472°W

Tournament information
- Dates: August 17–20, 2000
- Location: Louisville, Kentucky
- Course: Valhalla Golf Club
- Organized by: PGA of America
- Tour(s): PGA Tour; PGA European Tour; Japan Golf Tour

Statistics
- Par: 72
- Length: 7,167 yards (6,554 m)
- Field: 149 players, 80 after cut
- Cut: 147 (+3)
- Prize fund: $5,000,000 €5,548,408
- Winner's share: $900,000 €994,913

Champion
- (United States) Tiger Woods
- 270 (−18), playoff

Location in the United States
Location in Kentucky

The 2000 PGA Championship was the 82nd PGA Championship, held August 17–20 at the Valhalla Golf Club in Louisville, Kentucky. It was the second time for the event at Valhalla, which hosted four years earlier in 1996. Tiger Woods won his second straight PGA Championship and fifth major in a three-hole playoff over Bob May. Woods and May finished at 18 under par to set the PGA Championship record to par, later equaled by Woods in 2006. It was the first time since 1937 that a PGA Championship title was successfully defended, and the first as a stroke play event. Woods and May were five shots ahead of third-place finisher Thomas Bjørn.

Woods' victory marked the first time since 1953 (Ben Hogan) that a player had won three major championships in the same calendar year; Woods won the U.S. Open and the Open Championship in the previous two months for three consecutive majors. He went on to win the Masters in April 2001 to complete the Tiger Slam of four consecutive majors.

May opened with an even-par 72 then shot 66 (−6) in each of the final three rounds; this was the only time he was in contention in a major championship. Designer of the course and five-time champion Jack Nicklaus, age 60, made his final appearance at the PGA Championship. Playing with Woods, he needed an eagle on the 36th hole to make the cut; his pitch shot missed by inches and he settled for birdie.

Valhalla later hosted the Ryder Cup in 2008, the first U.S. victory in nine years. The Senior PGA Championship was played at the course in 2004 and 2011 and the PGA Championship returned in 2014 and 2024.

== Course layout ==
Hole	1	2	3	4	5	6	7	8	9	Out	10	11	12	13	14	15	16	17	18	In	Total
Yards	446	535	208	350	465	421	597	166	418	3,606	551	168	467	348	217	402	444	422	542	3,561	7,167
Par	4	5	3	4	4	4	5	3	4	36	5	3	4	4	3	4	4	4	5	36	72

Length of the course for previous majors:

- 7,144 yards (6,532 m), par 72 - 1996 PGA Championship

== Round summaries ==
=== First round ===
Thursday, August 17, 2000

Place	Player	Score	To par
T1	(United States) Scott Dunlap	66	−6
T1	(United States) Tiger Woods	66	−6
T3	(Northern Ireland) Darren Clarke	68	−4
T3	(United States) Davis Love III	68	−4
T5	(Trinidad and Tobago) Stephen Ames	69	−3
T5	(England) Ed Fryatt	69	−3
T5	(United States) Fred Funk	69	−3
T5	(United States) J. P. Hayes	69	−3
T9	(Australia) Stuart Appleby	70	−2
T9	(United States) Brian Henninger	70	−2
T9	(Spain) Miguel Ángel Jiménez	70	−2
T9	(United States) Jonathan Kaye	70	−2
T9	(United States) Tom Kite	70	−2
T9	(United States) Phil Mickelson	70	−2
T9	(France) Jean van de Velde	70	−2

=== Second round ===
Friday, August 18, 2000

Place	Player	Score	To par
1	(United States) Tiger Woods	66-67=133	−11
2	(United States) Scott Dunlap	66-68=134	−10
T3	(United States) Fred Funk	69-68=137	−7
T3	(United States) J. P. Hayes	69-68=137	−7
T3	(United States) Davis Love III	68-69=137	−7
T6	(United States) Notah Begay III	72-66=138	−6
T6	(United States) Bob May	72-66=138	−6
8	(Australia) Stuart Appleby	70-69=139	-5
T9	(Trinidad and Tobago) Stephen Ames	69-71=140	−4
T9	(Denmark) Thomas Bjørn	72-68=140	−4
T9	(Australia) Greg Chalmers	71-69=140	−4
T9	(Northern Ireland) Darren Clarke	68-72=140	−4
T9	(United States) Phil Mickelson	70-70=140	−4
T9	(United States) David Toms	72-68=140	−4

=== Third round ===
Saturday, August 19, 2000

Place	Player	Score	To par
1	(United States) Tiger Woods	66-67-70=203	−13
T2	(United States) Scott Dunlap	66-68-70=204	−12
T2	(United States) Bob May	72-66-66=204	−12
4	(United States) J. P. Hayes	69-68-68=205	−11
5	(Australia) Greg Chalmers	71-69-66=206	−10
T6	(Australia) Stuart Appleby	70-69-68=207	−9
T6	(Denmark) Thomas Bjørn	72-68-67=207	−9
T6	(Spain) José María Olazábal	76-68-63=207	−9
T9	(United States) Notah Begay III	72-66-70=208	−8
T9	(United States) Franklin Langham	72-71-65=208	−8

=== Final round ===
Sunday, August 20, 2000

In the final pairing and well ahead of the field at the turn, May and Woods both shot 31 (−5) on the back nine. A key hole was the par four 15th. Holding a one-shot lead, May hit his approach shot to within four feet (1.2 m) while Woods missed the green. Woods hit an indifferent chip to around ten feet (3 m) and then made the par putt. When May missed the short birdie putt, his lead remained a single stroke. After Woods' birdie on 17, they were tied going to the final hole, a par five. On the green, May curled in a double-breaking 15-footer (4.5 m) for birdie; Woods then sank a pressure-packed five-footer (1.5 m) for his own birdie to tie and force a three-hole playoff. In the penultimate pairing, Scott Dunlap bogeyed the first two holes and carded a 75 for 279; J.P Hayes had 76 for 281 and tied for nineteenth.

Place	Player	Score	To par	Money ($)
T1	(United States) Tiger Woods	66-67-70-67=270	−18	Playoff
T1	(United States) Bob May	72-66-66-66=270	−18	Playoff
3	(Denmark) Thomas Bjørn	72-68-67-68=275	−13	340,000
T4	(Australia) Stuart Appleby	70-69-68-69=276	−12	198,667
T4	(Australia) Greg Chalmers	71-69-66-70=276	−12	198,667
T4	(Spain) José María Olazábal	76-68-63-69=276	−12	198,667
7	(United States) Franklin Langham	72-71-65-69=277	−11	157,000
8	(United States) Notah Begay III	72-66-70-70=278	−10	145,000
T9	(Northern Ireland) Darren Clarke	68-72-72-67=279	−9	112,500
T9	(United States) Scott Dunlap	66-68-70-75=279	−9	112,500
T9	(United States) Fred Funk	69-68-74-68=279	−9	112,500
T9	(United States) Davis Love III	68-69-72-70=279	−9	112,500
T9	(United States) Phil Mickelson	70-70-69-70=279	−9	112,500
T9	(United States) Tom Watson	76-70-65-68=279	−9	112,500

==== Scorecard ====
Final round

Hole	1	2	3	4	5	6	7	8	9	10	11	12	13	14	15	16	17	18
Par	4	5	3	4	4	4	5	3	4	5	3	4	4	3	4	4	4	5
(United States) Woods	−13	−12	−12	−12	−12	−11	−12	−13	−13	−14	−14	−15	−15	−16	−16	−16	−17	−18
(United States) May	−12	−13	−13	−14	−14	−13	−13	−13	−13	−14	−15	−16	−16	−17	−17	−17	−17	−18
(Denmark) Bjørn	−9	−10	−10	−11	−11	−11	−11	−11	−11	−11	−11	−11	−12	−12	−12	−12	−13	−13
(Australia) Appleby	−10	−10	−10	−10	−10	−10	−10	−10	−11	−11	−11	−10	−10	−10	−11	−11	−12	−12
(Australia) Chalmers	−9	−10	−10	−10	−10	−10	−11	−10	−11	−11	−11	−12	−12	−12	−12	−12	−12	−12
(Spain) Olazábal	−9	−10	−10	−10	−10	−10	−11	−11	−11	−11	−11	−12	−12	−12	−13	−13	−13	−12
(United States) Langham	−8	−8	−8	−8	−8	−8	−9	−9	−10	−11	−12	−12	−12	−11	−12	−11	−12	−11
(United States) Begay	−9	−9	−9	−9	−9	−8	−9	−9	−9	−9	−9	−9	−8	−8	−8	−8	−9	−10

Cumulative tournament scores, relative to par

Birdie	Bogey

=== Playoff ===
Woods birdied the first playoff hole and parred the next two to win the three-hole playoff by one stroke.

Place	Player	Score	To par	Money ($)
1	(United States) Tiger Woods	3-4-5=12	−1	900,000
2	(United States) Bob May	4-4-5=13	E	540,000

==== Scorecard ====
Playoff

Hole	16	17	18
Par	4	4	5
(United States) Woods	−1	−1	−1
(United States) May	E	E	E

Cumulative playoff scores, relative to par
