= Bob May (golfer) =

American professional golfer (born 1968)

Personal information
- Full name: Robert Anthony May
- Nationality: United States
- Born: October 6, 1968 (age 58) Lynwood, California, U.S.
- Height: 5 ft 7 in (1.70 m)
- Weight: 155 lb (70 kg; 11.1 st)

Career
- Sport: Golf
- College: Oklahoma State University
- Turned professional: 1991
- Former tours: PGA Tour; European Tour; Asia Golf Circuit; Web.com Tour
- Professional wins: 1
- Highest ranking: 24 (September 10, 2000)

Number of wins by tour
- European Tour: 1

Best results in major championships
- Masters Tournament: T43: 2001
- PGA Championship: 2nd: 2000
- U.S. Open: T23: 2000
- The Open Championship: T11: 2000

Robert Anthony May (born October 6, 1968) is an American professional golfer. He is most notable for losing to Tiger Woods in a three-hole playoff for the 2000 PGA Championship at Valhalla.

== Early life and amateur career ==
May was born on October 6, 1968. He attended Los Altos High School in Hacienda Heights, California, and was featured in the Faces in the Crowd section in Sports Illustrated at age 16 in 1984.

May played college golf at Oklahoma State University in Stillwater, and was a member of the American Walker Cup team in 1991.

== Professional career ==
In 1991, May turned professional. Early in his career, he played primarily internationally on the Asia Golf Circuit and the European Tour. May won the 1999 Victor Chandler British Masters on the European Tour.

On the PGA Tour he did not win on the tour but he finished second three times, including a playoff loss to Tiger Woods at the 2000 PGA Championship at Valhalla and most recently at the 2006 B.C. Open at Turning Stone Resort & Casino, where he lost by one to John Rollins.

His career was curtailed by a back injury in 2003, and in 2006 he played the PGA Tour on a Major Medical Exemption. After the 2007 season, he lost his PGA Tour card. From 2008 through 2010, May played primarily on the Nationwide Tour along with some PGA Tour events. He lost his status on the minor-league tour after missing 15 of 25 cuts in 2010; he played in only eight tournaments in 2011 and just twice in 2012. May was in the top 50 of the Official World Golf Ranking for much of 2000 and 2001.

== Professional wins (1) ==
=== European Tour wins (1) ===
No.	Date	Tournament	Winning score	Margin of victory	Runner-up
1	12 Sep 1999	Victor Chandler British Masters	−19 (69-67-66-67=269)	1 stroke	(Scotland) Colin Montgomerie

European Tour playoff record (0–1)

No.	Year	Tournament	Opponent	Result
1	2000	PGA Championship	(United States) Tiger Woods	Lost three-hole aggregate playoff; Woods: −1 (3-4-5=12), May: E (4-4-5=13)

== Playoff record ==
PGA Tour playoff record (0–1)

No.	Year	Tournament	Opponent	Result
1	2000	PGA Championship	(United States) Tiger Woods	Lost three-hole aggregate playoff; Woods: −1 (3-4-5=12), May: E (4-4-5=13)

Ben Hogan Tour playoff record (0–1)

No.	Year	Tournament	Opponent	Result
1	1992	Ben Hogan Wichita Charity Classic	(Australia) Jeff Woodland	Lost to birdie on sixth extra hole

== Results in major championships ==
Tournament	1998	1999	2000	2001
Masters Tournament				T43
U.S. Open			T23	T30
The Open Championship	74		T11	CUT
PGA Championship			2	73

Top 10
Did not play

CUT = missed the half-way cut
"T" = tied

== Results in The Players Championship ==
Tournament	2002
The Players Championship	T36

"T" indicates a tie for a place

== Results in World Golf Championships ==
Tournament	1999	2000	2001
Match Play			R32
Championship	T20	T11	NT^{1}
Invitational			

^{1}Canceled due to 9/11

Did not play

QF, R16, R32, R64 = Round in which player lost in match play
"T" = tied
NT = No Tournament

== Results in senior major championships ==
Tournament	2019	2020	2021	2022	2023	2024
The Tradition		NT				
Senior PGA Championship	T60	NT	CUT			
U.S. Senior Open		NT		T58	CUT	69
Senior Players Championship						
Senior British Open Championship	T79	NT				

Did not play

CUT = missed the halfway cut
"T" indicates a tie for a place
NT = No tournament due to COVID-19 pandemic

== U.S. national team appearances ==
Amateur

- Walker Cup: 1991 (winners)

== See also ==
- 1993 Nike Tour graduates
- 1999 PGA Tour Qualifying School graduates
- 2006 PGA Tour Qualifying School graduates
