= List of golfers to achieve a three-win promotion from the Korn Ferry Tour =

This is a list of golfers who have won three times in a Korn Ferry Tour season since 1997, when a policy was enacted to promote such players immediately to the PGA Tour. The "number of events" column refers to the number of Korn Ferry Tour events it took the golfer to reach three wins.

No.	Season	Player	Date of third win	Number of events	Results on PGA Tour after promotion			
No.	Season	Player	Date of third win	Number of events	Events played	Best finish	Earnings ($)	Rank
1	1997	(United States) Chris Smith	Aug 10	16	5	4th	120,768*	151
2	2001	(United States) Heath Slocum	Aug 5	17	8	T37	45,670	(218)
3	2001	(United States) Chad Campbell	Oct 7	21	2	2nd	259,200	(156)
4	2001	(United States) Pat Bates	Oct 28	24	0	n/a		
5	2002	(United States) Patrick Moore	Oct 27	20	1	Cut	n/a	
6	2003	(United States) Tom Carter	Aug 31	21	8	T12	105,143	207
7	2005	(United States) Jason Gore	Aug 7	11	7	Win	871,135*	94
8	2007	(Australia) Nick Flanagan	Aug 19	16	4	T17	122,029	209
9	2009	(Australia) Michael Sim	Aug 23	12	1	T55	130,188*	200
10	2014	(Mexico) Carlos Ortiz	Aug 24	16	0	n/a	12,834*	(249)
11	2016	(United States) Wesley Bryan	Aug 7	13	2	T8	178,729*	194
12	2020–21	(Chile) Mito Pereira	Jun 13	32	6	T5	370,348	177
13	2024	(United States) Matt McCarty	Aug 25	23	4	Win	1,366,340	114

*Includes earnings from one or more PGA Tour events played before promotion.

== See also ==
- List of golfers with most Korn Ferry Tour wins
