= 2003 U.S. Open (golf) =

Coordinates: 41.521°N 87.687°W

Tournament information
- Dates: June 12–15, 2003
- Location: Olympia Fields, Illinois
- Courses: Olympia Fields Country Club; North Course
- Organized by: USGA
- Tours: PGA Tour; European Tour; Japan Golf Tour

Statistics
- Par: 70
- Length: 7,190 yards (6,575 m)
- Field: 156 players, 68 after cut
- Cut: 143 (+3)
- Prize fund: $6,000,000 €5,130,394
- Winner's share: $1,080,000 €923,471

Champion
- (United States) Jim Furyk
- 272 (−8)

Location in the United States

The 2003 United States Open Championship was the 103rd U.S. Open, held June 12–15 at the North Course of Olympia Fields Country Club in Olympia Fields, Illinois, a suburb south of Chicago. Jim Furyk won his only major championship, three shots ahead of runner-up Stephen Leaney. With a total score of 272, Furyk tied the record for the lowest 72-hole score in U.S. Open history, also achieved in 2000, 1993 and 1980 (and since lowered to 268 in 2011). Another record was equalled by Vijay Singh, who tied Neal Lancaster's 9-hole record of 29 on the back nine of his second round.

This was the fourth major held at Olympia Fields; it hosted the U.S. Open in 1928 and the PGA Championship in 1925 and 1961.

== Course ==
North Course

Hole	1	2	3	4	5	6	7	8	9	Out	10	11	12	13	14	15	16	17	18	In	Total
Yards	576	400	389	164	440	555	212	433	496	3,665	444	467	458	397	414	187	451	247	460	3,525	7,190
Par	5	4	4	3	4	5	3	4	4	36	4	4	4	4	4	3	4	3	4	34	70

== Field ==
1. Last 10 U.S. Open Champions

Ernie Els (4,9,10,11,12,13,16), Retief Goosen (9,10,16), Lee Janzen, Corey Pavin, Tiger Woods (3,4,5,8,9,11,12,16)

- Steve Jones did not play due to an injury.

2. Top two finishers in the 2002 U.S. Amateur

Ricky Barnes (a), Hunter Mahan (a)

3. Last five Masters Champions

José María Olazábal (9,10), Vijay Singh (5,9,11,12,16), Mike Weir (11,12,16)

4. Last five British Open Champions

David Duval, Paul Lawrie (10,16), Mark O'Meara

5. Last five PGA Champions

Rich Beem (9,12,16), David Toms (9,11,16)

6. The Players Champion

Davis Love III (9,11,16)

7. The U.S. Senior Open Champion

Don Pooley

8. Top 15 finishers and ties in the 2002 U.S. Open

Robert Allenby (9,16), Tom Byrum, Nick Faldo, Sergio García (9,10,16), Jay Haas (11,16), Pádraig Harrington (10,13,16), Dudley Hart, Scott Hoch (16), Justin Leonard (9,11,16), Peter Lonard (15,16), Jeff Maggert, Billy Mayfair, Phil Mickelson (9,16), Nick Price (9,16)

9. Top 30 leaders on the 2002 PGA Tour official money list

K. J. Choi (16), Chris DiMarco (16), Bob Estes (16), Fred Funk (16), Jim Furyk (11,16), Charles Howell III (16), Jerry Kelly (16), Steve Lowery, Scott McCarron, Shigeki Maruyama (16), Len Mattiace (16), Rocco Mediate (16), Kenny Perry (11,16), Chris Riley (16), Loren Roberts, John Rollins, Jeff Sluman (16)

10. Top 15 on the 2002 European Tour Order of Merit

Thomas Bjørn (16), Ángel Cabrera (16), Michael Campbell (16), Trevor Immelman (16), Stephen Leaney, Colin Montgomerie (16), Eduardo Romero (16), Justin Rose (16), Adam Scott (16)

11. Top 10 on the PGA Tour official money list, as of May 25

12. Winners of multiple PGA Tour events from April 24, 2002, through the 2003 Memorial Tournament

13. Top 2 from the 2003 European Tour Order of Merit, as of May 26

14. Top 2 on the 2002 Japan Golf Tour, provided they are within the top 75 point leaders of the Official World Golf Rankings at that time

Toru Taniguchi

15. Top 2 on the 2002 PGA Tour of Australasia, provided they are within the top 75 point leaders of the Official World Golf Rankings at that time

Craig Parry (16)

16. Top 50 on the Official World Golf Rankings list, as of May 26

Stuart Appleby, Paul Casey, Darren Clarke, Fred Couples, Niclas Fasth, Brad Faxon, Steve Flesch, Bernhard Langer, Kirk Triplett, Scott Verplank

17. Special exemptions selected by the USGA

Hale Irwin, Tom Kite, Tom Watson

Sectional qualifiers

- Tarzana, California: Anthony Arvidson (L), Bill Lunde (L), Rick Reinsberg (a,L), Warren Schutte (L)
- Littleton, Colorado: Tom Glissmeyer (a,L), Bret Guetz (L)
- Orlando, Florida: Doug Dunakey (L), Maarten Lafeber, Alan Morin (L), Matt Seppanen (L), Grant Waite
- Roswell, Georgia: Billy Andrade, Luke List (a,L)
- Glenview, Illinois: Brian Davis, Tom Gillis, Jason Knutzon (L), Bryce Molder (L)
- Chevy Chase, Maryland: Chris Anderson (L), Sean Murphy (L), Dicky Pride (L)
- Rockville, Maryland: Tommy Armour III, Woody Austin, Jay Don Blake, Craig Bowden, Olin Browne, Bob Burns, Jonathan Byrd, Alex Čejka, Robert Damron, Marco Dawson, Ryan Dillon (L), Joe Durant, Dan Forsman, Brian Gay, Bill Haas (a), Brian Henninger, Brandt Jobe, Richard S. Johnson, Kent Jones, Cliff Kresge, Doug LaBelle II (L), Neal Lancaster, Ian Leggatt, Spike McRoy, Larry Mize, Rod Pampling, Brett Quigley, Chez Reavie (a), Joey Sindelar, Darron Stiles, Hidemichi Tanaka, Roland Thatcher, Jay Williamson, Mark Wurtz (L)
- Kansas City, Missouri: Steve Gotsche (L)
- Purchase, New York: Cortney Brisson (L), Freddie Jacobson, John Maginnes, Geoffrey Sisk (L)
- Cleveland, Ohio: Chad Campbell
- Columbus, Ohio: Rob Bradley (L), Mark Calcavecchia, Stewart Cink, Tim Clark, Brad Elder, J. P. Hayes, J. B. Holmes (a,L), Jonathan Kaye, Hiroshi Matsuo (L), Sean McCarty (L), Joe Ogilvie, Geoff Ogilvy, Jesper Parnevik, Tim Petrovic, Rory Sabbatini, David Smail, Chris Smith, Kevin Sutherland, Bob Tway, Dean Wilson
- McKinney, Texas: Greg Hiller, Trip Kuehne (a)
- Auburn, Washington: Chris Baryla (a,L)

Alternates who gained entry

- Roy Biancalana (L, Kansas City) – replaced Steve Jones

(a) denotes amateur
(L) denotes player advanced through local qualifying

== Round summaries ==
=== First round ===
Thursday, June 12, 2003

Place	Player	Score	To par
T1	(United States) Brett Quigley	65	−5
T1	(United States) Tom Watson	65	−5
T3	(United States) Jay Don Blake	66	−4
T3	(United States) Justin Leonard	66	−4
T5	(United States) Jim Furyk	67	−3
T5	(Australia) Stephen Leaney	67	−3
T7	(United States) Mark Calcavecchia	68	−2
T7	(United States) Tom Gillis	68	−2
T7	(Canada) Ian Leggatt	68	−2
T10	(United States) Jonathan Byrd	69	−1
T10	(United States) Tom Byrum	69	−1
T10	(South Africa) Tim Clark	69	−1
T10	(United States) Robert Damron	69	−1
T10	(South Africa) Ernie Els	69	−1
T10	(Spain) Sergio García	69	−1
T10	(Republic of Ireland) Pádraig Harrington	69	−1
T10	(Sweden) Freddie Jacobson	69	−1
T10	(United States) Cliff Kresge	69	−1
T10	(United States) Len Mattiace	69	−1
T10	(United States) Billy Mayfair	69	−1
T10	(Scotland) Colin Montgomerie	69	−1
T10	(United States) Tim Petrovic	69	−1
T10	(United States) Loren Roberts	69	−1
T10	(Japan) Hidemichi Tanaka	69	−1

=== Second round ===
Friday, June 13, 2003

Place	Player	Score	To par
T1	(United States) Jim Furyk	67-66=133	−7
T1	(Fiji) Vijay Singh	70-63=133	−7
T3	(United States) Jonathan Byrd	69-66=135	−5
T3	(Australia) Stephen Leaney	67-68=135	−5
T5	(Sweden) Freddie Jacobson	69-67=136	−4
T5	(United States) Justin Leonard	66-70=136	−4
T5	(Zimbabwe) Nick Price	71-65=136	−4
T5	(Argentina) Eduardo Romero	70-66=136	−4
T5	(United States) Tiger Woods	70-66=136	−4
T10	(United States) Robert Damron	69-68=137	−3
T10	(United States) Tom Watson	65-72=137	−3

Amateurs: Kuehne (+1), Barnes (+2), Holmes (+5), Baryla (+6), Mahan (+6), Haas (+9), List (+9), Reinsberg (+12), Reavie (+13), Glissmeyer (+19).

=== Third round ===
Saturday, June 14, 2003

Place	Player	Score	To par
1	(United States) Jim Furyk	67-66-67=200	−10
2	(Australia) Stephen Leaney	67-68-68=203	−7
T3	(Zimbabwe) Nick Price	71-65-69=205	−5
T3	(Fiji) Vijay Singh	70-63-72=205	−5
T5	(United States) Jonathan Byrd	69-66-71=206	−4
T5	(Canada) Ian Leggatt	68-70-68=206	−4
T5	(United States) Dicky Pride	71-69-66=206	−4
T5	(Argentina) Eduardo Romero	70-66-70=206	−4
T9	(United States) Mark Calcavecchia	68-72-67=207	−3
T9	(United States) Billy Mayfair	69-71-67=207	−3
T9	(United States) Mark O'Meara	72-68-67=207	−3

=== Final round ===
Sunday, June 15, 2003

Place	Player	Score	To par	Money ($)
1	(United States) Jim Furyk	67-66-67-72=272	−8	1,080,000
2	(Australia) Stephen Leaney	67-68-68-72=275	−5	650,000
T3	(United States) Kenny Perry	72-71-69-67=279	−1	341,367
T3	(Canada) Mike Weir	73-67-68-71=279	−1	341,367
T5	(South Africa) Ernie Els	69-70-69-72=280	E	185,934
T5	(Sweden) Freddie Jacobson	69-67-73-71=280	E	185,934
T5	(Zimbabwe) Nick Price	71-65-69-75=280	E	185,934
T5	(England) Justin Rose	70-71-70-69=280	E	185,934
T5	(United States) David Toms	72-67-70-71=280	E	185,934
T10	(Republic of Ireland) Pádraig Harrington	69-72-72-68=281	+1	124,936
T10	(United States) Jonathan Kaye	70-70-72-69=281	+1	124,936
T10	(United States) Cliff Kresge	69-70-72-70=281	+1	124,936
T10	(United States) Billy Mayfair	69-71-67-74=281	+1	124,936
T10	(United States) Scott Verplank	76-67-68-70=281	+1	124,936

Amateurs: Trip Kuehne (+10), Ricky Barnes (+11)

==== Scorecard ====
Final round

Hole	1	2	3	4	5	6	7	8	9	10	11	12	13	14	15	16	17	18
Par	5	4	4	3	4	5	3	4	4	4	4	4	4	4	3	4	3	4
(United States) Furyk	−10	−10	−10	−10	−10	−11	−11	−11	−11	−10	−10	−9	−9	−10	−10	−10	−9	−8
(Australia) Leaney	−6	−7	−6	−7	−7	−8	−7	−6	−6	−6	−5	−5	−6	−6	−6	−6	−5	−5
(United States) Perry	+1	E	−1	−1	E	−1	−1	−1	−1	−1	−1	−1	−1	E	E	−1	−1	−1
(Canada) Weir	−2	−2	−2	−2	−2	−2	−3	−3	−2	−2	−2	−2	−2	−3	−3	−3	−2	−1
(South Africa) Els	E	+1	E	E	−1	−1	−1	−1	E	E	E	E	E	E	E	−1	E	E
(Sweden) Jacobson	E	+1	+1	+1	E	+1	+1	+1	+1	+1	+1	+1	E	+1	E	−1	−1	E
(Zimbabwe) Price	−4	−3	−2	−2	−2	−3	−2	−2	−1	−1	E	E	−1	−1	−2	−2	−1	E
(England) Rose	E	E	E	E	+1	+1	+1	+1	+1	E	E	E	E	E	E	−1	E	E
(United States) Toms	E	−1	−1	−1	−1	−1	−1	−1	E	E	E	E	E	E	E	E	E	E
(Fiji) Singh	−5	−6	−4	−4	−3	−3	−3	−2	−1	E	+1	+2	+3	+3	+2	+1	+2	+3

Cumulative tournament scores, relative to par
