= Oregon Classic =

Tournament information
- Location: Junction City, Oregon
- Established: 1998
- Course: Shadow Hills Country Club
- Par: 72
- Length: 7,007 yards (6,407 m)
- Tour: Nationwide Tour
- Format: Stroke play
- Prize fund: US$500,000
- Month played: September
- Final year: 2008

Tournament record score
- Aggregate: 269 Matt Bettencourt (2008)
- To par: −19 as above

Final champion
- (United States) Matt Bettencourt
- Location in the United States Location in Oregon

The Oregon Classic was a golf tournament on the Nationwide Tour from 1998 to 2008. It was played at the Shadow Hills Country Club in Junction City, Oregon, United States.

The 2008 purse was $500,000, with $99,000 going to the winner.

== Winners ==
Year	Winner	Score	To par	Margin of victory	Runner(s)-up
Oregon Classic
2008	(United States) Matt Bettencourt	269	−19	2 strokes	(United States) Bubba Dickerson
2007	(United States) Kyle Thompson	271	−17	Playoff	(Australia) Matt Jones (United States) Jon Turcott
2006	(United States) Cliff Kresge	271	−17	Playoff	(United States) Ricky Barnes
2005	(United States) Jeff Gove	201 (Note: Shortened to 54 holes due to rain.)	−15	3 strokes	(United States) Jamie Broce (United States) Kris Cox (Mexico) Esteban Toledo (New Zealand) Tim Wilkinson
2004	(United States) Jeff Quinney	275	−13	3 strokes	(United States) Barry Cheesman
2003	(United States) Chris Couch	274	−14	Playoff	(United States) Jason Bohn
2002	(United States) Jason Gore	270	−18	3 strokes	(United States) Marco Dawson (United States) Jeff Freeman (United States) Patrick Moore (United States) Arron Oberholser (United States) Tag Ridings
Buy.com Oregon Classic
2001	Canceled due to the September 11 attacks				
2000	(United States) Keoke Cotner	272	−16	2 strokes	(United States) Jody Bellflower (United States) Tommy Biershenk
Nike Oregon Classic
1999	(United States) Kelly Gibson	279	−9	1 stroke	(New Zealand) Craig Perks
1998	(United States) Charles Raulerson	272	−16	5 strokes	(United States) Notah Begay III (United States) John Elliott (United States) Tom Scherrer
