= Jason Gore =

American professional golfer (born 1974)

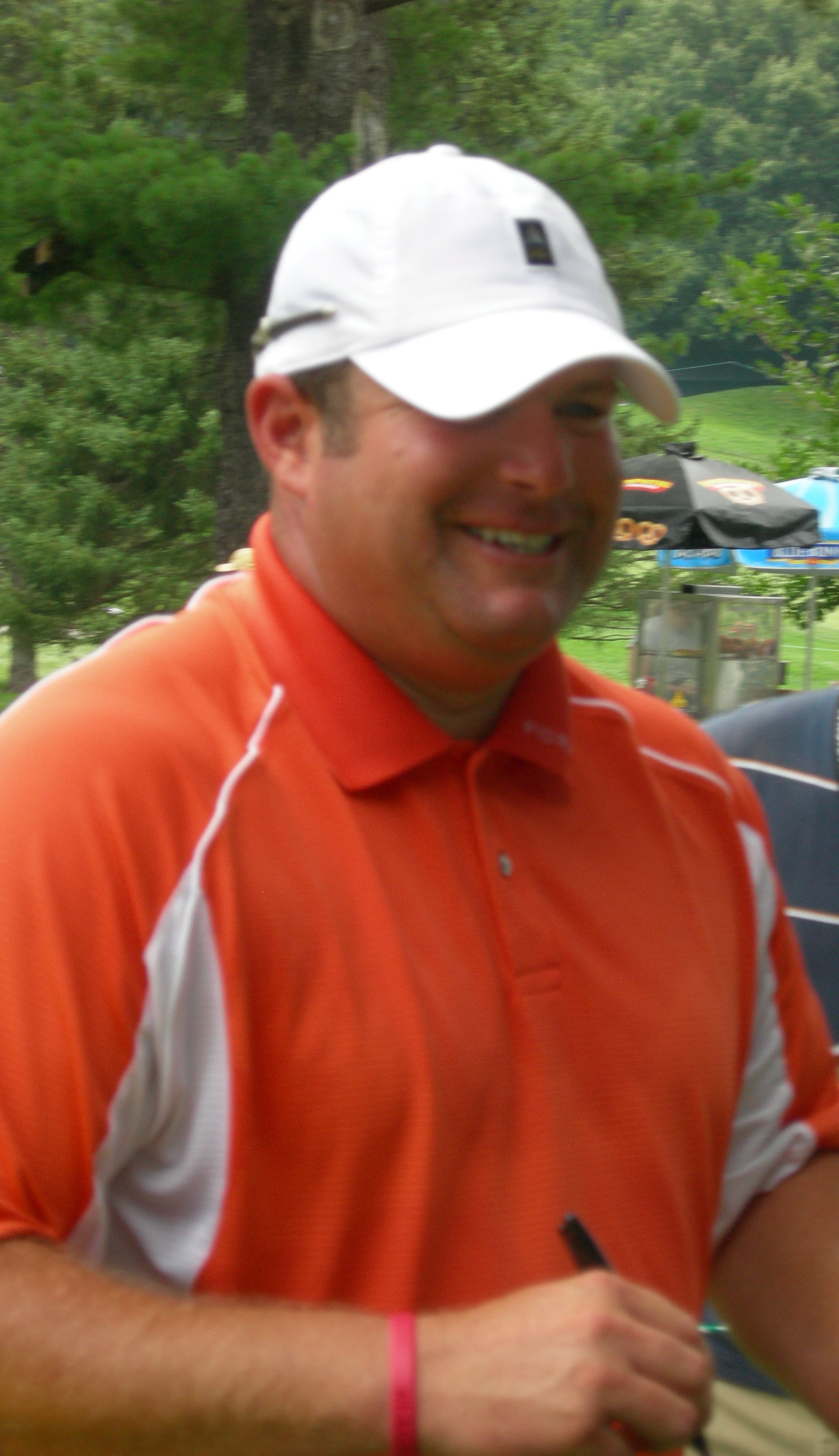

Personal information
- Full name: Jason William Gore
- Nationality: United States
- Born: May 17, 1974 (age 52) Van Nuys, California, U.S.
- Height: 6 ft 0 in (1.83 m)
- Weight: 245 lb (111 kg; 17.5 st)

Career
- Sport: Golf
- College: University of Arizona; Pepperdine University
- Turned professional: 1997
- Current tour: PGA Tour Champions
- Former tours: PGA Tour; Web.com Tour
- Professional wins: 12
- Highest ranking: 77 (December 11, 2005)

Number of wins by tour
- PGA Tour: 1
- Korn Ferry Tour: 7 (1st all time)
- Other: 4

Best results in major championships
- Masters Tournament: DNP
- PGA Championship: T62: 2006
- U.S. Open: T47: 2010
- The Open Championship: DNP

Achievements and awards
- Nationwide Tour Player of the Year: 2005

Jason William Gore (born May 17, 1974) is an American professional golfer. He is the all-time leader in wins on the Web.com Tour with seven.

== Amateur career ==
Gore was born in Van Nuys, California. He grew up playing junior golf with Tiger Woods.

Gore attended the University of Arizona, then transferred to Pepperdine University. At Pepperdine, he was part of their NCAA Division I Championship team in 1997. He also played on the victorious Walker Cup team that year.

== Professional career ==
Gore turned professional in 1997. In 2005, he played on the PGA Tour after moving from the Nationwide Tour mid-season, after receiving a battlefield promotion, which is given when a player wins three Nationwide Tour events in one season.

Gore has one PGA Tour win, the 84 Lumber Classic in 2005, and is the all-time leader in career wins on what is now the Korn Ferry Tour, with seven. He is the first golfer to earn a three-win promotion and a PGA Tour win in the same season. Gore belongs to a small group of players who have shot 59 in their careers. His historic round of 59 happened on Friday of the 2005 Cox Classic at Champions Run in Omaha, Nebraska.

Gore played in the final group of the 2005 U.S. Open with Retief Goosen. He shot a 14-over-par 84 to drop all the way to a tie for 49th; Michael Campbell won the event. Gore was not fully exempt on the PGA Tour from 2009 to 2014. Gore had a strong 2015, but a poor 2016 saw him finish outside 150th, limiting him to past champion status for 2017.

During the third round of the 2016 Farmers Insurance Open at Torrey Pines, Gore made a double eagle on the par-5 18th hole.

After injuries and poor play, Gore went into the insurance business. In 2018, he received his license and is one of the co-founders of Kirkman Gore Insurance Services.

As a comeback from his retirement, Gore earned a sponsor exemption for the 2018 RSM Classic on the PGA Tour. After three rounds, he was in second place, a stroke behind leader Charles Howell III after posting scores of 68, 63 and 67. In the final round, Gore shot +2 and finished T15 for the tournament. In March 2019, Gore was named the first player relations director for the USGA.

In June 2024, he made his debut on the PGA Tour Champions.

== Personal life ==
Gore resides in Gladstone, New Jersey with his family.

Jason is currently Executive Vice President and Chief Player Officer for the PGA Tour.

== Amateur wins ==
this list may be incomplete

- 1996 Sahalee Players Championship
- 1997 Pacific Coast Amateur, California State Amateur

== Professional wins (12) ==
=== PGA Tour wins (1) ===
No.	Date	Tournament	Winning score	Margin of victory	Runner-up
1	Sep 18, 2005	84 Lumber Classic	−14 (65-72-67-70=274)	1 stroke	(Paraguay) Carlos Franco

=== Nationwide Tour wins (7) ===
No.	Date	Tournament	Winning score	Margin of victory	Runner(s)-up
1	Oct 8, 2000	Buy.com New Mexico Classic	−14 (67-69-64-66=266)	3 strokes	(United States) Mike Grob
2	Sep 15, 2002	Oregon Classic	−18 (67-67-65-71=270)	3 strokes	(United States) Marco Dawson, (United States) Jeff Freeman, (United States) Patrick Moore, (United States) Arron Oberholser, (United States) Tag Ridings
3	Sep 22, 2002	Albertsons Boise Open	−15 (66-68-66-73=273)	2 strokes	(United States) Emlyn Aubrey, (United States) Barry Cheesman
4	Jul 10, 2005	National Mining Association Pete Dye Classic	−17 (69-66-68-68=271)	1 stroke	(United States) Doug LaBelle II
5	Jul 17, 2005	Scholarship America Showdown	−14 (67-68-64-67=266)	4 strokes	(United States) Bill Haas
6	Aug 7, 2005	Cox Classic	−23 (71-59-68-63=261)	Playoff	(United States) Roger Tambellini
7	Oct 17, 2010	Miccosukee Championship	−16 (65-67-65-71=268)	4 strokes	(United States) Scott Gutschewski, (United States) Kevin Kisner

Nationwide Tour playoff record (1–0)

No.	Year	Tournament	Opponent	Result
1	2005	Cox Classic	(United States) Roger Tambellini	Won with birdie on second extra hole

=== Other wins (4) ===
- 1997 (1) California State Open (as an amateur)
- 2004 (1) California State Open
- 2008 (1) Straight Down Fall Classic (with Kevin Marsh)
- 2013 (1) Straight Down Fall Classic (with Kevin Marsh)

== Results in major championships ==
Tournament	1998	1999	2000	2001	2002	2003	2004	2005	2006	2007	2008	2009	2010
Masters Tournament													
U.S. Open	CUT							T49			CUT		T47
The Open Championship													
PGA Championship									T62				

Did not play

CUT = missed the half-way cut
"T" = tied

== Results in The Players Championship ==
Tournament	2006	2007	2008	2009	2010	2011	2012	2013	2014	2015	2016
The Players Championship	CUT	T23	WD								CUT

Did not play

CUT = missed the halfway cut
WD = withdrew
"T" indicates a tie for a place

== Results in World Golf Championships ==
Tournament	2006
Match Play	
Championship	
Invitational	T36

Did not play

"T" = Tied

== U.S. national team appearances ==
Amateur

- Walker Cup: 1997 (winners)

== See also ==
- 2000 PGA Tour Qualifying School graduates
- 2002 Buy.com Tour graduates
- 2005 Nationwide Tour graduates
- 2014 Web.com Tour Finals graduates
- List of golfers with most Web.com Tour wins
- Lowest rounds of golf
