= Virginia Beach Open =

Tournament information
- Location: Virginia Beach, Virginia
- Established: 2000
- Course: TPC Virginia Beach
- Par: 72
- Length: 7,436 yards (6,799 m)
- Tour: Nationwide Tour
- Format: Stroke play
- Prize fund: US$450,000
- Month played: May
- Final year: 2006

Tournament record score
- Aggregate: 268 Andrew Buckle (2006)
- To par: −20 as above

Final champion
- (Australia) Andrew Buckle
- Location in the United States Location in Virginia

The Virginia Beach Open was a regular golf tournament on the Nationwide Tour. It was played annually until 2006 at The TPC of Virginia Beach golf course in Virginia Beach, Virginia, United States.

The 2006 purse was $450,000, with $81,000 going to the winner.

== Winners ==
Year	Winner	Score	To par	Margin of victory	Runner(s)-up
Virginia Beach Open
2006	(Australia) Andrew Buckle	268	−20	5 strokes	(United States) Justin Bolli
2005	(United States) Troy Matteson	275	−13	2 strokes	(United States) Chris Couch
2004	(United States) James Driscoll	273	−15	4 strokes	(United States) Jason Buha (United States) Kyle Thompson (United States) Jimmy Walker
VB Open
2003	(New Zealand) Michael Long	277	−11	2 strokes	(United States) Vaughn Taylor
Virginia Beach Open
2002	(United States) Cliff Kresge	277	−11	Playoff	(United States) Arron Oberholser
Buy.com Virginia Beach Open
2001	(Namibia) Trevor Dodds	277	−11	3 strokes	(South Africa) Deane Pappas
2000	(Japan) Ryuji Imada	275	−13	5 strokes	(United States) Todd Demsey
