= Joel Kribel =

American professional golfer (born 1977)

Personal information
- Nationality: United States
- Born: January 27, 1977 (age 49) Pleasanton, California, U.S.
- Height: 6 ft 2 in (188 cm)
- Weight: 170 lb (77 kg)

Career
- Sport: Golf
- College: Stanford University
- Turned professional: 1999
- Former tours: PGA Tour; Web.com Tour; PGA Tour Canada; Gateway Tour
- Professional wins: 1

Best results in major championships
- Masters Tournament: 45th: 1998
- PGA Championship: DNP
- U.S. Open: CUT: 1997, 1998, 2001
- The Open Championship: DNP

Joel Kribel (born January 27, 1977) is a former American professional golfer who played on the PGA Tour, Web.com Tour, PGA Tour Canada, and Gateway Tour.

== Amateur career ==
Kribel was born in Pleasanton, California. As a junior golfer, Kribel was a member of the Castlewood Country Club Junior Golf Program, a program that produced several professional golfers including Paula Creamer, Dana Dormann, Pat Hurst, and Todd Fischer. He attended Amador Valley High School, won two NCGA Northern California High School Boys Individual Championships, and went on to play his collegiate golf at Stanford University where he was a teammate of Tiger Woods.

At Stanford, Kribel was a 4-time NCAA All-American, was named 1st team all Pac-10 Conference four times, and was Pac-10 Player of the Year in 1999. He was also a member of the United States teams in the 1997 Walker Cup and the 1997 Palmer Cup.

As an amateur, Kribel won the 1996 Western Amateur and was the runner-up in the 1997 U.S. Amateur, falling to Matt Kuchar 2 & 1. In the 1998 U.S. Amateur, Kribel won medalist honors shooting a 4-under-par 136.

== Professional career ==
Kribel turned professional after graduating from Stanford in 1999. In 2002, Kribel played on the 2002 Buy.com Tour, which is now the Web.com Tour, and earned his 2003 PGA Tour card by finishing in a tie for 11th at the 2002 PGA Qualifying School tournament. His best finish on the PGA Tour was 4th place at the 2004 John Deere Classic, and his best finish on the Web.com Tour was 2nd place at the 2002 Hershey Open. Kribel also played on several other professional golf tours, including the Gateway Tour and PGA Tour Canada, and in 2009, Kribel won the Gateway Tour Desert Winter #1 Tournament.

Kribel resides in Phoenix, Arizona.

== Amateur wins ==
- 1994 Junior PGA Championship
- 1996 Western Amateur, Pacific Northwest Amateur

== Professional wins (1) ==
=== Gateway Tour wins (1) ===
No.	Date	Tournament	Winning score	Margin of victory	Runner-up
1	Jan 7, 2009	Desert Winter 1	−10 (69-69-68=206)	Playoff	(United States) Ryan Dillon

== Playoff record ==
Buy.com Tour playoff record (0–1)

No.	Year	Tournament	Opponents	Result
1	2002	Hershey Open	(United States) Brian Claar, (United States) Steve Ford, (United States) Cliff Kresge	Kresge won with birdie on third extra hole

== Results in major championships ==
Tournament	1997	1998	1999	2000	2001
Masters Tournament		45			
U.S. Open	CUT	CUT			CUT

Note: Kribel never played in The Open Championship or the PGA Championship.

Did not play

CUT = missed the half-way cut

== U.S. national team appearances ==
Amateur

- Eisenhower Trophy: 1996, 1998
- Walker Cup: 1997
- Palmer Cup: 1997

== See also ==
- 2002 PGA Tour Qualifying School graduates
