= Bank of America Open =

Golf tournament

Tournament information
- Location: Glenview, Illinois
- Established: 2002
- Course: The Glen Club
- Par: 72
- Length: 7,241 yards (6,621 m)
- Tour: Nationwide Tour
- Format: Stroke play
- Prize fund: $750,000
- Final year: 2008

Tournament record score
- Aggregate: 271 Andre Stolz (2003); 271 John Riegger (2007)
- To par: −17 as above

Final champion
- (United States) Kris Blanks
- Location in the United States Location in Illinois

The Bank of America Open was a golf tournament on the Nationwide Tour from 2002 to 2008. It was played at The Glen Club in Glenview, Illinois, United States. It was known as the LaSalle Bank Open from 2002 to 2007.

The 2008 purse was $750,000, with $135,000 going to the winner.

== Winners ==
| Year | Winner | Score | To par | Margin of victory | Runner(s)-up | Ref. |
LaSalle Bank Open
| 2002 | (United States) Marco Dawson | 276 | −12 | 2 strokes | (United States) Darron Stiles | |
| 2003 | (Australia) Andre Stolz | 271 | −17 | 2 strokes | (United States) Tommy Tolles | |
| 2004 | (Australia) Brendan Jones | 268 | −16 | 1 stroke | (United States) D. A. Points | |
| 2005 | (United States) Chris Couch | 269 | −15 | 4 strokes | (United States) Kevin Durkin (Australia) Paul Gow (United States) Mario Tiziani | |
| 2006 | (United States) Jason Dufner | 279 | −5 | 1 stroke | (United States) Cliff Kresge | |
| 2007 | (United States) John Riegger | 271 | −17 | 1 stroke | (United States) B. J. Staten | |
Bank of America Open
| 2008 | (United States) Kris Blanks | 272 | −16 | 1 stroke | (United States) Bob May | |
