= Andre Stolz =

Australian professional golfer (born 1970)

Personal information
- Full name: Andre Pierre Stolz
- Nickname: Stolzy
- Nationality: Australia
- Born: 10 May 1970 (age 56) Brisbane, Australia
- Height: 1.80 m (5 ft 11 in)
- Weight: 80 kg (176 lb; 12 st 8 lb)
- Spouse: Katrina Stolz
- Children: 4

Career
- Sport: Golf
- Turned professional: 1992
- Current tours: PGA Tour of Australasia; OneAsia Tour; Nationwide Tour
- Former tours: Japan Golf Tour; PGA Tour
- Professional wins: 59
- Highest ranking: 53 (13 April 2003)

Number of wins by tour
- PGA Tour: 1
- Japan Golf Tour: 1
- PGA Tour of Australasia: 5
- Korn Ferry Tour: 1
- Other: 51

Best results in major championships
- Masters Tournament: DNP
- PGA Championship: CUT: 2003
- U.S. Open: DNP
- The Open Championship: DNP

Achievements and awards
- OneAsia Tour Order of Merit winner: 2011

Andre Pierre Stolz (born 10 May 1970) is an Australian professional golfer.

== Career ==
In 1970, Stolz was born in Brisbane, Australia. In 1992, he turned professional. Early in his career, he played on the PGA Tour of Australasia and Japan Golf Tour.

In 2003, he started playing on the Nationwide Tour. In 2003, he won the LaSalle Bank Open on the Nationwide Tour and finished 13th on the money list, earning his PGA Tour card for 2004. On the PGA Tour, he won the 2004 Michelin Championship at Las Vegas with a one-stroke victory over Tag Ridings, securing his card through 2006. However, an injury to his left wrist in 2005 halted his career.

After taking three years off, Stolz went back to playing, competing in his native Australia, Asia, and the Nationwide Tour. In 2011, he led the OneAsia Tour's Order of Merit with two wins. Stolz also played two events on the PGA Tour, his first on the tour since 2005.

== Personal life ==
In 2013, Stolz and his son Zac played in the Australian Open. They became the first father-son duo since Gary Player and his son Wayne to compete at the event.

In 2013, Zac Stolz started playing collegiately at UT-Chattanooga in the United States.

== Awards and honors ==
- In 2011, Stolz won the Order of Merit on the OneAsia Tour.
- In 2023 and 2024, he topped the Order of Merit for the PGA of Australia Legends Tour.

== Professional wins (59) ==
=== PGA Tour wins (1) ===
No.	Date	Tournament	Winning score	Margin of victory	Runners-up
1	10 Oct 2004	Michelin Championship at Las Vegas	−21 (67-67-65-67=266)	1 stroke	(United States) Harrison Frazar, (United States) Tom Lehman, (United States) Tag Ridings

=== Japan Golf Tour wins (1) ===
No.	Date	Tournament	Winning score	Margin of victory	Runners-up
1	6 Apr 2003	Token Homemate Cup	−6 (65-71-71-71=278)	1 stroke	(Japan) Nobuhiro Masuda. (Japan) Tadahiro Takayama, (Japan) Tsuyoshi Yoneyama

=== PGA Tour of Australasia wins (5) ===
Legend
Tour Championships (1)
Other PGA Tour of Australasia (4)

No.	Date	Tournament	Winning score	Margin of victory	Runner-up
1	5 Mar 2000	ANZ Tour Championship	−15 (72-68-64-69=273)	3 strokes	(Australia) Brett Rumford
2	16 Jun 2002	Queensland PGA Championship	−22 (64-66-68-68=266)	2 strokes	(Australia) Paul Sheehan
3	27 Oct 2002	ANZ Victorian Open Championship	−8 (69-72-65-68=274)	Playoff	(Australia) David Bransdon
4	6 Feb 2009	Cellarbrations Victorian PGA Championship	−17 (68-67-69-67=271)	2 strokes	(Australia) Stuart Bouvier
5	21 Sep 2013	South Pacific Open Championship	−16 (67-66-69-66=268)	Playoff	(Australia) Michael Wright

PGA Tour of Australasia playoff record (2–0)

No.	Year	Tournament	Opponent	Result
1	2002	ANZ Victorian Open Championship	(Australia) David Bransdon	Won with par on second extra hole
2	2013	South Pacific Open Championship	(Australia) Michael Wright	Won with par on fifth extra hole

=== Nationwide Tour wins (1) ===
No.	Date	Tournament	Winning score	Margin of victory	Runner-up
1	8 Jun 2003	LaSalle Bank Open	−17 (70-65-68-68=271)	2 strokes	(United States) Tommy Tolles

=== OneAsia Tour wins (2) ===
No.	Date	Tournament	Winning score	Margin of victory	Runner-up
1	27 Mar 2011	Indonesian PGA Championship	−14 (67-70-69-68=274)	1 stroke	(Indonesia) Rory Hie
2	14 Aug 2011	Thailand Open	−22 (69-65-64-63=266)	2 strokes	(Thailand) Prayad Marksaeng

=== PGA of Australia Legends Tour wins (46) ===
No.	Date	Tournament	Winning score	Margin of victory	Runner(s)-up
1	7 Nov 2020	Australian PGA Senior Championship	−9 (67-64-70=201)	4 strokes	(Australia) Peter Lonard
2	10 Mar 2021	"The Jack Harris & Brian Twite" Victorian PGA Seniors Foursomes Championship (with (New Zealand) Michael Long)			
3	9 Jul 2021	Tropical Auto Group Yeppoon Legends Pro-Am			
4	14 Jul 2021	Kens Plumbing Plus / CUB / Lindsay Australia Bargara Legends Pro-Am			
5	18 Jul 2021	Urangan Smash Repairs Fraser Coast Classic			
6	23 Aug 2021	Royal QLD Legends Pro-Am			
7	13 Dec 2021	QLD Senior PGA Championship			
8	17 Dec 2021	Sunshine Coast Masters (with (Australia) Peter Senior)			
9	8 Jul 2022	Yeppoon Legends Pro-Am			
10	23 Jul 2022	Pacific Harbour Legends Pro-Am			
11	22 Aug 2022	Bartons / BMD Wynnum Legends Pro-Am			
12	12 Nov 2022	Roseville Golf Club Mashie & Pro-Am			
13	9 Dec 2022	Cricks Sunshine Coast Masters			
14	11 Feb 2023	Tokarahi Legends Pro-Am			
15	21 Feb 2023	Barwon Cleaning Supplies Portarlington Legends Pro-Am (with (Australia) Terry Price)			
16	27 Feb 2023	South Yarra Volkswagen Legends Pro Am (with two others)			
17	28 Feb 2023	Settlers Run Legends Pro-Am (with (Australia) David Diaz)			
18	7 Jul 2023	Yeppoon Legends Pro-Am (with two others)			
19	9 Jul 2023	Town of 1770 Agnes Water Legends Pro-Am			
20	12 Jul 2023	Bargara Legends Pro-Am			
21	17 Sep 2023	Findex Yamba Legends Pro-Am			
22	19 Oct 2023	Fidelity Capital Group Charity Legends Pro-Am			
23	23 Oct 2023	TLE Fairbairn Legends Pro-Am			
24	14 Nov 2023	The Glenn Joyner Australian Golf Club Legends Pro-Am			
25	18 Nov 2023	Roseville Golf Club Mashie & Pro-Am			
26	21 Nov 2023	Col Crawford BMW NSW Senior PGA Championship			
27	15 Dec 2023	Sunshine Coast Masters (with (Australia) Rod Pampling)			
28	1 Mar 2024	Gardiners Run Legends Pro-Am			
29	8 Apr 2024	The MG Plasterers & Steeline SA PGA Seniors Championship			
30	6 Jun 2024	Vuksich & Borich Fiji Legends Golf Classic			
31	30 Jun 2024	Australian PGA Senior 9 Hole Championships Pro-Am			
32	14 Jul 2024	Urangan Smash Repairs Fraser Coast Classic			
33	30 Jul 2024	William (Bill) Beattie Henderson Memorial Cup			
34	30 Sep 2024	New Era Technology East's Legends Charity Pro Am (with (Australia) Grahame Stinson)			
35	16 Oct 2024	ACT Senior PGA Championship			
36	19 Oct 2024	Cowra Lamb Legends Pro-Am			
37	22 Oct 2024	Kent Relocation Group NSW Senior PGA Championship (with (Australia) Brad Burns)			
38	10 Nov 2024	Nova Employment Australian PGA Senior Championship	−17 (63-63-64=190)	5 strokes	(Australia) Matthew Goggin, (Australia) Jason Norris
39	8 Jul 2025	Rowes Bay Legends Pro-Am			
40	11 Aug 2025	Paul King Memorial Legends Pro-Am (with (Australia) Mark Boulton)			
41	17 Sep 2025	The Coastwide First National Legends Pro-Am (with (Australia) Scott Barr)			
42	21 Sep 2025	Ray White Yamba Legends Pro-Am (with (Australia) Jason Norris)			
43	10 Oct 2025	TLE ACT Senior PGA Championship			
44	15 Dec 2025	Queensland Senior PGA Championship			
45	25 Feb 2026	"The Jack Harris & Brian Twite" Victorian PGA Seniors Foursomes Championship (with David Crawford)			
46	8 May 2025	Moree Legends Pro-Am			

=== Other senior wins (2) ===
- 2024 SA PGA Senior Foursomes Championships (with David Crawford), NSW PGA Senior Foursomes Championship (with David Crawford)

== Results in major championships ==
Tournament	2003
PGA Championship	CUT

CUT = missed the halfway cut
Note: Stolz only played in the PGA Championship.

== Results in The Players Championship ==
Tournament	2005
The Players Championship	CUT

CUT = missed the halfway cut

== Results in World Golf Championships ==
Tournament	2004
Match Play	
Championship	65
Invitational	

Did not play

== See also ==
- 2003 Nationwide Tour graduates
