= Rob McKelvey =

American professional golfer

Personal information
- Nationality: United States
- Born: August 2, 1969 (age 57) Atlanta, Georgia, U.S.
- Height: 6 ft 2 in (1.88 m)
- Weight: 195 lb (88 kg; 13.9 st)

Career
- Sport: Golf
- College: Central Alabama Community College; University of Southwestern Louisiana
- Turned professional: 1992
- Former tours: Buy.com Tour; T. C. Jordan Tour
- Professional wins: 2

Number of wins by tour
- Korn Ferry Tour: 1
- Other: 1

Rob McKelvey (born August 2, 1969) is an American professional golfer. He played on the Nationwide Tour.

== Career ==
In 1996, McKelvey joined the Nike Tour. In his rookie year on tour, he recorded three top-10 finishes with his best result coming at the Nike Dominion Open where he finished in a tie for second. From 1997 to 1999 he recorded five top-10 finishes with his best result being a tie for third. He picked up his first win on tour in 2000 at the Buy.com Louisiana Open. He continued to play on tour until 2004.

== Professional wins (2) ==
=== Buy.com Tour wins (1) ===
No.	Date	Tournament	Winning score	Margin of victory	Runner-up
1	Apr 2, 2000	Buy.com Louisiana Open	−14 (66-68-72-68=274)	1 stroke	(Canada) Ian Leggatt

=== T. C. Jordan Tour wins (1) ===
No.	Date	Tournament	Winning score	Margin of victory	Runner-up
1	Jul 11, 1993	B&A Travel Classic	−11 (72-66-68-71=277)	1 stroke	(United States) Steve Pope
