= James Driscoll =

American professional golfer (born 1997)

Personal information
- Nationality: United States
- Born: October 9, 1977 (age 49) Boston, Massachusetts, U.S.
- Height: 6 ft 0 in (1.83 m)
- Weight: 185 lb (84 kg)

Career
- Sport: Golf
- College: University of Virginia
- Turned professional: 2001
- Current tour: Korn Ferry Tour
- Former tour: PGA Tour
- Professional wins: 3

Number of wins by tour
- Korn Ferry Tour: 2
- Other: 1

Best results in major championships
- Masters Tournament: CUT: 2001
- PGA Championship: DNP
- U.S. Open: CUT: 2005
- The Open Championship: CUT: 2009, 2012

James Driscoll (born October 9, 1977) is an American professional golfer who has played on the PGA Tour.

== Early life ==
Driscoll was born in Boston, Massachusetts, the youngest of seven children. He grew up in Brookline, Massachusetts, outside Boston. He started golf at a young age and won the club championship at his home club of Charles River at age 15. A year later, he won the Massachusetts Junior Championship. He then went on to win the Massachusetts State Amateur Championship in 1996 at the age of 18, becoming the youngest-ever winner of the tournament, and again in 1998. By the summer of 1996 Driscoll was the second-ranked junior in the country, and made the final of the U.S. Junior, losing to Scott Hailes.

Driscoll attended Brookline High School and then attended The Taft School in Watertown, Connecticut, for a postgraduate year.

== Amateur career ==
Driscoll attended the University of Virginia where he was a three-time All-American, won the 1998 Golf Digest Invitational, and tied the school record for career top-10 finishes (23). He reached the final of the 2000 U.S. Amateur at Baltusrol Golf Club by upsetting Luke Donald in the semifinals. In the final against Jeff Quinney, he came back from three down with three to play to force extra holes, but lost on the 39th hole. His runner-up finish gave him an invitation to the 2001 Masters Tournament. At the Masters, Driscoll fired a 68 in the first round, marking the best opening round by an amateur since Ken Venturi's 66 in 1956. His playing partner Tom Watson said, "This was the best round I've seen here by an amateur." Driscoll shot 78 in the second round to miss the cut by one stroke. He was a member of the 2001 Walker Cup team.

== Professional career ==
Driscoll turned professional in 2001. He won his first professional title at the 2004 Virginia Beach Open on the Nationwide Tour. This propelled him to a seventh-place finish on the money list, giving him a PGA Tour card for 2005. Aided by a playoff loss to Tim Petrovic at the Zurich Classic of New Orleans, in which he missed a birdie putt on the final green of regulation for the win, he finished 100th on the PGA Tour money list in his rookie season, thereby retaining his card for 2006, but he lost his card after his second season. In 2007 he finished 24th on the Nationwide Tour money list to again earn promotion. He had his second runner-up finish at the 2009 Valero Texas Open, where he lost to Zach Johnson in a playoff. He retained status through the end of the 2014 season, after which he returned to the second tier, by then known as the Web.com Tour. After finishing outside the top 100 on the Web.com Tour money list in 2015, he expected to have to go to Q School, but was informed by the PGA Tour that he was eligible for a one-time exemption on the Web.com Tour available to players who had been exempt on the PGA Tour for five consecutive years in either of the first two seasons after losing fully exempt status. Playing on this exemption for the 2016 season, he won his second career Web.com Tour title at the Nashville Golf Open.

== Amateur wins ==
- 1993 Massachusetts Junior Amateur
- 1994 Hornblower Memorial Tournament
- 1995 New England Amateur, Western Junior
- 1996 Massachusetts Amateur
- 1998 Massachusetts Amateur, Golf Digest Invitational
- 1999 North and South Amateur, Hornblower Memorial Tournament

== Professional wins (3) ==
=== Web.com Tour wins (2) ===
No.	Date	Tournament	Winning score	Margin of victory	Runner(s)-up
1	Sep 12, 2004	Virginia Beach Open	−15 (70-69-66-68=273)	4 strokes	(United States) Jason Buha, (United States) Kyle Thompson, (United States) Jimmy Walker
2	Jun 19, 2016	Nashville Golf Open	−19 (65-68-69-67=269)	3 strokes	(United States) Brian Campbell

Web.com Tour playoff record (0–1)

No.	Year	Tournament	Opponent	Result
1	2004	Northeast Pennsylvania Classic	(United States) D. A. Points	Lost to par on first extra hole

=== Other wins (1) ===
- 2015 New England Open

== Playoff record ==
PGA Tour playoff record (0–2)

No.	Year	Tournament	Opponent	Result
1	2005	Zurich Classic of New Orleans	(United States) Tim Petrovic	Lost to par on first extra hole
2	2009	Valero Texas Open	(United States) Zach Johnson	Lost to birdie on first extra hole

== Results in major championships ==
Tournament	2001	2002	2003	2004	2005	2006	2007	2008	2009	2010	2011	2012
Masters Tournament	CUT											
U.S. Open					CUT							
The Open Championship									CUT			CUT
PGA Championship												

Did not play

CUT = missed the half-way cut

== U.S. national team appearances ==
Amateur

- Walker Cup: 2001

== See also ==
- 2004 Nationwide Tour graduates
- 2007 Nationwide Tour graduates
- 2010 PGA Tour Qualifying School graduates
