= Buha =

Buha may refer to:

- Buha, the home area of the Ha people in Kigoma Region, Tanzania
- Buha, a tributary of the river Sterminos in Romania
- Buha (surname)
