= Dayton Open =

Tournament information
- Location: Dayton, Ohio
- Established: 1999
- Course: The Golf Club at Yankee Trace
- Par: 72
- Tour: Nationwide Tour
- Format: Stroke play
- Prize fund: US$450,000
- Month played: July
- Final year: 2003

Tournament record score
- Aggregate: 262 Todd Barranger (2001)
- To par: −26 as above

Final champion
- (United States) Guy Boros
- Location in the United States Location in Ohio

The Dayton Open was a golf tournament on the Nationwide Tour from 1999 to 2003. It was played at The Golf Club at Yankee Trace, in the Dayton, Ohio suburb of Centerville.

The purse in 2003 was $450,000, with $81,000 going to the winner.

== Winners ==
Year	Winner	Score	To par	Margin of victory	Runner(s)-up
Dayton Open
2003	(United States) Guy Boros	265	−23	3 strokes	(United States) Zach Johnson
2002	(United States) Jason Buha	265	−23	3 strokes	(United States) Todd Barranger (United States) Marco Dawson
Buy.com Dayton Open
2001	(United States) Todd Barranger	262	−26	1 stroke	(United States) Bo Van Pelt
2000	(Canada) Ian Leggatt	276	−12	Playoff	(United States) Chris Smith
Nike Dayton Open
1999	(United States) John Wilson	268	−20	1 stroke	(United States) Brian Tennyson
