= Oberholser =

Oberholser is a German surname. Notable people with the surname include:

- Arron Oberholser (born 1975), American golfer and television commentator
- Harry C. Oberholser (1870–1963), American ornithologist
