= Henrico County Open =

Golf tournament (1993–2008)

Tournament information
- Location: Richmond, Virginia
- Established: 1993
- Course: The Dominion Club
- Par: 72
- Length: 7,188 yards (6,573 m)
- Tour: Nationwide Tour
- Format: Stroke play
- Prize fund: US$500,000
- Month played: April
- Final year: 2008

Tournament record score
- Aggregate: 258 Daniel Chopra (2004)
- To par: −30 as above

Final champion
- (Australia) Greg Chalmers

Location map
- Location in the United States Location in Virginia

The Henrico County Open was a golf tournament on the Nationwide Tour from 1993 to 2008. It was played at The Dominion Club in Richmond, Virginia, United States.

The 2008 purse was $500,000, with $90,000 going to the winner.

== Winners ==
Year	Winner	Score	To par	Margin of victory	Runner(s)-up
Henrico County Open
2008	(Australia) Greg Chalmers	274	−14	Playoff	(Norway) Henrik Bjørnstad
2007	(Australia) Nick Flanagan	275	−13	Playoff	(Canada) Chris Baryla (Canada) Bryn Parry (United States) Roland Thatcher
2006	(United States) Matt Kuchar	279	−9	Playoff	(United States) Paul Claxton
2005	(United States) Chad Collins	267	−21	2 strokes	(United States) Tom Scherrer
2004	(Sweden) Daniel Chopra	258	−30	4 strokes	(Australia) Nathan Green (United States) Franklin Langham
2003	(Australia) Mark Hensby	268	−20	Playoff	(United States) Zach Johnson
Greater Richmond Open
2002	(United States) Patrick Moore	268	−20	1 stroke	(United States) John Maginnes
Buy.com Richmond Open
2001	(United States) Chad Campbell	263	−21	3 strokes	(United States) Kelly Gibson
2000	(United States) Steve Runge	272	−8	Playoff	(United States) Chris Smith
Nike Dominion Open
1999	(United States) Darron Stiles	279	−9	1 stroke	(Australia) Mathew Goggin (United States) Dick Mast
1998	(United States) Bob Burns	274	−14	2 strokes	(United States) Pat Bates (United States) Eric Johnson (United States) Perry Moss (United States) Mike Sullivan
1997	(United States) Jeff Julian	277	−11	1 stroke	(United States) Bobby Wadkins
1996	(United States) Olin Browne	276	−12	1 stroke	(United States) Michael Christie (United States) Rob McKelvey
1995	(United States) Hugh Royer III	270	−18	Playoff	(United States) Tom Scherrer
1994	(United States) Sonny Skinner	271	−17	Playoff	(United States) Jim Carter
1993	(Paraguay) Ángel Franco	272	−16	2 strokes	(United States) Rocky Walcher
