= Buha (surname) =

Buha is a surname. Notable people with this surname include:

- Aleksa Buha (born 1939), Serbian philosopher
- Aljoša Buha (1962–1988), Bosnian musician
- Boško Buha (1926–1943), Yugoslav Partisan
- Jason Buha (born 1975), American golfer
