= Jeff Quinney =

American professional golfer (born 1978)

Personal information
- Full name: Jeffrey Michael Quinney
- Nationality: United States
- Born: November 17, 1978 (age 47) Eugene, Oregon, U.S.
- Height: 6 ft 1 in (1.85 m)
- Weight: 190 lb (86 kg; 14 st)

Career
- Sport: Golf
- College: Arizona State University
- Turned professional: 2001
- Former tours: PGA Tour; Web.com Tour
- Professional wins: 3
- Highest ranking: 48 (June 22, 2008)

Number of wins by tour
- Korn Ferry Tour: 1

Best results in major championships
- Masters Tournament: CUT: 2001
- PGA Championship: CUT: 2007, 2008
- U.S. Open: T29: 2008
- The Open Championship: CUT: 2001, 2008

Jeffrey Michael Quinney (born November 17, 1978) is an American professional golfer.

== Early life and amateur career ==
Quinney was born in Eugene, Oregon.

Quinney had a successful amateur career, winning the U.S. Amateur in 2000, and represented the USA in the Walker Cup in 2001.

== Professional career ==
After turning professional in 2001 he played on the Canadian Tour and Nationwide Tour, and won the Oregon Classic in 2004. He finished in the top 10 of the Nationwide Tour Order of Merit in 2006, enabling him to play on the PGA Tour in 2007.

Quinney made a strong start in his rookie season, earning four top-ten finishes in his first five events. This run of good form propelled him into the top 100 of the Official World Golf Rankings.

In May 2008 he reached the top 50 of the world rankings after finishing third at The Players Championship.

Quinney was named the assistant coach of the University of Oregon men's golf team in 2021. He became the school's interim head coach in October after Casey Martin had his leg amputated.

== Amateur wins ==
- 1998 Pacific Northwest Amateur
- 2000 U.S. Amateur, Pacific Northwest Amateur

== Professional wins (3) ==
=== Nationwide Tour wins (1) ===
| No. | Date | Tournament | Winning score | To par | Margin of victory | Runner-up |
|---|---|---|---|---|---|---|
| 1 | Sep 19, 2004 | Oregon Classic | 71-71-70-63=275 | −13 | 3 strokes | (United States) Barry Cheesman |

Nationwide Tour playoff record (0–1)

| No. | Year | Tournament | Opponent | Result |
|---|---|---|---|---|
| 1 | 2006 | Scholarship America Showdown | (United States) Brandt Snedeker | Lost to birdie on third extra hole |

=== Canadian Tour wins (2) ===
| No. | Date | Tournament | Winning score | To par | Margin of victory | Runner(s)-up |
|---|---|---|---|---|---|---|
| 1 | Mar 31, 2002 | Scottsdale Swing at McCormick Ranch | 63-68-66-68=265 | −23 | 6 strokes | (United States) James Driscoll |
| 2 | Jun 2, 2002 | Bay Mills Open | 69-74-69-70=282 | −6 | 1 stroke | (United States) Dave Christensen, (United States) Mario Tiziani |

== Results in major championships ==
| Tournament | 2001 | 2002 | 2003 | 2004 | 2005 | 2006 | 2007 | 2008 |
|---|---|---|---|---|---|---|---|---|
| Masters Tournament | CUT | | | | | | | |
| U.S. Open | CUT | | | | | | | T29 |
| The Open Championship | CUT | | | | | | | CUT |
| PGA Championship | | | | | | | CUT | CUT |

Did not play

CUT = missed the half-way cut
"T" = tied

== Results in The Players Championship ==
| Tournament | 2007 | 2008 | 2009 | 2010 |
|---|---|---|---|---|
| The Players Championship | T6 | 3 | T68 | CUT |

Top 10

CUT = missed the halfway cut
"T" indicates a tie for a place

== U.S. national team appearances ==
Amateur

- Eisenhower Trophy: 2000 (winners)
- Palmer Cup: 2001 (winners)
- Walker Cup: 2001

== See also ==
- 2006 Nationwide Tour graduates
