= The Golf Club at Yankee Trace =

- Location within Ohio
- 39.5989°N 84.1975°W

Club information
- Location: Centerville, Ohio
- Established: 1995
- Type: Public
- Tota holes: 27
- Tournaments: Dayton Open
- Greens: Bent grass
- Fairways: Bent grass
- Website: yankeetrace.org

Heritage Course
- Designed by: Gene Bates
- Par: 36
- Length: 3,509
- Course rating: 36.6
- Slope rating: 132

Vintage Course
- Designed by: Gene Bates
- Par: 36
- Length: 3,191
- Course rating: 35.1
- Slope rating: 129

Legend Course
- Designed by: Gene Bates
- Par: 36
- Length: 3,645
- Course rating: 37.3
- Slope rating: 131

The Golf Club at Yankee Trace is a golf course in Centerville, Ohio. It opened in the spring of 1995 with 18 holes designed by Gene Bates, adding 9 more holes in 2002. It hosted the Dayton Open on the Nationwide Tour from 1999 to 2003. The property has been voted “The Best Golf Course” in Dayton for 20 consecutive years by the Dayton Daily News.

== Scorecards ==
Heritage Course
Tee	Rating/Slope	1	2	3	4	5	6	7	8	9	Total
Black	36.6/132	512	411	174	455	320	565	202	464	405	3508
Blue	35.6/132	480	380	153	432	312	556	179	448	385	3325
White	34.9/124	470	353	137	376	307	508	162	416	375	3104
Gold	M:33.7/119 W:36.1/121	445	338	127	341	282	472	143	370	328	2846
Green	M:32.6/112 W:34.9/117	399	303	111	331	227	462	132	341	290	2596
Par		5	4	3	4	4	5	3	4	4	36
SI		5	4	9	2	7	1	8	3	6

Vintage Course
Tee	Rating/Slope	1	2	3	4	5	6	7	8	9	Total
Black	35.1/129	393	196	325	388	166	396	510	308	509	3191
Blue	34.5/127	386	185	318	378	155	387	480	291	473	3053
White	33.8/123	368	146	289	356	149	359	454	281	452	2854
Gold	M:32.6/118 W:35.1/115	315	123	269	326	139	331	426	261	413	2603
Green	M:31.3/113 W:33.2/107	305	107	239	279	126	292	364	232	379	2323
Par		4	3	4	4	3	4	5	4	5	36
SI		3	8	9	4	5	2	1	7	6

Legend Course
Tee	Rating/Slope	1	2	3	4	5	6	7	8	9	Total
Black	37.3/131	426	376	600	155	435	402	225	462	564	3645
Blue	36.2/129	403	347	563	141	406	389	196	437	545	3427
White	35.2/131	367	337	528	137	396	379	180	397	502	3223
Gold	M:33.9/126 W:37/119	338	290	485	127	362	340	170	334	483	2929
Green	M:32.4/110 W:35/109	328	237	465	119	332	267	104	318	400	2570
Par		4	4	5	3	4	4	3	4	5	36
SI		4	7	2	9	6	5	8	3	1
