= Andrew Buckle =

Australian professional golfer (born 1982)

Personal information
- Full name: Andrew Nicholas Buckle
- Nationality: Australia
- Born: 24 September 1982 (age 44) Brisbane, Queensland
- Height: 5 ft 9 in (1.75 m)
- Weight: 180 lb (82 kg; 13 st)

Career
- Sport: Golf
- Turned professional: 2002
- Former tours: PGA Tour of Australasia; PGA Tour; Asian Tour; Nationwide Tour; Gateway Tour
- Professional wins: 3
- Highest ranking: 79 (9 July 2006)

Number of wins by tour
- PGA Tour of Australasia: 1
- Korn Ferry Tour: 1
- Other: 1

Best results in major championships
- Masters Tournament: DNP
- PGA Championship: CUT: 2006
- U.S. Open: CUT: 2007
- The Open Championship: T61: 2006

Andrew Nicholas Buckle (born 24 September 1982) is an Australian professional golfer.

== Early life and amateur career ==
Buckle was born in Brisbane, Queensland. He had a promising amateur career, including two wins in the Boy's 15–17 division at the World Junior Golf Championships and the Australian Amateur.

== Professional career ==
In 2002, he turned professional. He won the 2002 Queensland Open on his professional debut. As a professional, he has plied his trade all over the world, including time on the PGA Tour of Australasia and appearances in Europe and Japan. He joined the Asian Tour in 2005 and in 2006 he finished second in the Indonesia Open and the TCL Classic, which are both Asian Tour/European Tour co-sanctioned events. Also in 2006, he won his second professional event at Virginia Beach Open on the U.S.-based Nationwide Tour.

Buckle has performed consistently around the world and for a time in 2006 he was the only golfer in the top 100 of the Official World Golf Ranking who was not a member of one of the three richest under-50 men's tours (the PGA, European and Japanese tours), but he won a PGA Tour card at the 2006 Qualifying School. He played on the PGA Tour in 2007 and 2008 but had to return to the Nationwide Tour in 2009.

== Amateur wins ==
- 1999 World Junior Golf Championships – Boys' 15–17 division
- 2000 World Junior Golf Championships – Boys' 15–17 division
- 2001 Australian Amateur
- 2002 Queensland Amateur (Australia), Saujana Amateur Open (Malaysia), Dogwood Invitational (United States)

== Professional wins (3) ==
=== PGA Tour of Australasia wins (1) ===
No.	Date	Tournament	Winning score	Margin of victory	Runners-up
1	3 Nov 2002	Queensland Open	−14 (71-67-68-68=274)	2 strokes	(Australia) Ryan Haller, (Australia) Paul Sheehan, (Australia) Craig Warren

=== Nationwide Tour wins (1) ===
No.	Date	Tournament	Winning score	Margin of victory	Runner-up
1	7 May 2006	Virginia Beach Open	−20 (67-68-64-69=268)	5 strokes	(United States) Justin Bolli

=== Gateway Tour wins (1) ===
- 2013 National Series 10

== Results in major championships ==
Tournament	2004	2005	2006	2007
U.S. Open				CUT
The Open Championship	CUT		T61	
PGA Championship			CUT	

Buckle never played in the Masters Tournament.

Did not play

CUT = missed the half-way cut
"T" = tied

== Team appearances ==
Amateur

- Nomura Cup (representing Australia): 2001 (winners)
- Eisenhower Trophy (representing Australia): 2002
- Australian Men's Interstate Teams Matches (representing Queensland): 2001 (winners), 2002

== See also ==
- 2006 Nationwide Tour graduates
