= Florida Classic (golf) =

Buy.com Florida Classic
Tournament information
- Location: Gainesville, Florida
- Established: 1999
- Course: Gainesville Country Club
- Par: 71
- Tour: Buy.com Tour
- Format: Stroke play
- Prize fund: US$425,000
- Month played: March
- Final year: 2001

Tournament record score
- Aggregate: 269 Chris Couch (2001)
- To par: −15 as above

Final champion
- (United States) Chris Couch
- Location in the United States Location in Florida

The Florida Classic was a golf tournament on the Buy.com Tour from 1999 to 2001. It was played at the Gainesville Country Club in Gainesville, Florida.

The purse in 2001 was US$425,000, with $76,500 going to the winner.

== Winners ==
Year	Winner	Score	To par	Margin of victory	Runner-up
Buy.com Florida Classic
2001	(United States) Chris Couch	269	−15	1 stroke	(United States) Chad Campbell
2000	(United States) Fran Quinn	271	−13	3 strokes	(Australia) Mark Hensby
Nike Florida Classic
1999	(Wales) Richard Johnson	270	−14	1 stroke	(United States) Bobby Wadkins
