= Keoke Cotner =

American professional golfer

Personal information
- Nationality: United States
- Born: July 11, 1971 (age 55) Córdoba, Veracruz, Mexico
- Height: 5 ft 10 in (1.78 m)
- Weight: 185 lb (84 kg; 13.2 st)

Career
- Sport: Golf
- College: University of North Texas
- Turned professional: 1994
- Former tour: Nationwide Tour
- Professional wins: 1

Number of wins by tour
- Korn Ferry Tour: 1

Keoke Cotner (born July 11, 1971) is an American professional golfer who played on the Nationwide Tour.

== Professional career ==
Cotner joined the Nationwide Tour in 2000. In his rookie year on Tour he recorded three top-10 finishes and won the Buy.com Oregon Classic. The following year he also recorded three top-10 finishes while finishing in a tie for second twice. In 2002 he recorded his career best finish on the money list, 25th, while recording four top-10 finishes including a tied for second. From 2003 to 2009 he recorded nine top-10 finishes including a runner up finish in 2004, 2005 and 2008.

== Personal life ==
His brother, Kawika, is also a professional golfer and has played on the PGA Tour and the Nationwide Tour.

== Professional wins (1) ==
=== Buy.com Tour wins (1) ===
No.	Date	Tournament	Winning score	Margin of victory	Runners-up
1	Sep 24, 2000	Buy.com Oregon Classic	−16 (69-70-65-68=272)	2 strokes	(United States) Jody Bellflower, (United States) Tommy Biershenk
