= Brian Claar =

American golfer (born 1959)

Personal information
- Full name: Brian J. Claar
- Nationality: United States
- Born: July 29, 1959 (age 67) Santa Monica, California
- Height: 5 ft 9 in (1.75 m)
- Weight: 150 lb (68 kg; 11 st)

Career
- Sport: Golf
- College: University of Tampa
- Turned professional: 1981
- Former tours: PGA Tour; Asia Golf Circuit
- Professional wins: 3

Best results in major championships
- Masters Tournament: CUT: 1990
- PGA Championship: T9: 1992
- U.S. Open: 5th: 1989
- The Open Championship: T49: 1995

Achievements and awards
- PGA Tour Rookie of the Year: 1986
- Asia Golf Circuit Order of Merit winner: 1989

Brian J. Claar (born July 29, 1959) is an American professional golfer.

== Early life ==
Claar was born in Santa Monica, California. He played college golf at the University of Tampa where he was a two-time All-American. He was inducted into their Athletic Hall of Fame in 1989.

== Professional career ==
Claar turned professional in 1981. He played on the PGA Tour from 1986 to 1998. He was selected as the PGA Rookie of the Year in 1986. His best finish was a T-2 at the 1991 AT&T Pebble Beach National Pro-Am. He then played primarily on the Nationwide Tour from 1999 to 2002. His best finishes on this tour were a pair of T-2s in 2002, a playoff loss at the Hershey Open and T-2 at the Utah Classic.

Outside of the United States, Claar had success on the Asia Golf Circuit. In 1989 he claimed the Order of Merit title having won twice during the season, at the Hong Kong and Thailand opens.

Claar twice finished in the top-10 at a major. At the 1989 U.S. Open, he finished fifth, two shots behind Curtis Strange. At the 1992 PGA Championship, he finished tied for ninth, six shots behind Nick Price.

Claar has also worked as Champions Tour official.

== Professional wins (3) ==
=== Asia Golf Circuit wins (2) ===
No.	Date	Tournament	Winning score	Margin of victory	Runner(s)-up
1	Feb 19, 1989	Johnnie Walker Hong Kong Open	−6 (70-68-69-67=274)	1 stroke	(Sweden) Mats Lanner, (United States) Gary Rusnak
2	Feb 26, 1989	Thai International Thailand Open	−16 (66-67-68-71=272)	3 strokes	(United States) E. J. Pfister

=== Other wins (1) ===
- 1983 Rhode Island Open

== Playoff record ==
Buy.com Tour playoff record (0–1)

No.	Year	Tournament	Opponents	Result
1	2002	Hershey Open	(United States) Steve Ford, (United States) Cliff Kresge, (United States) Joel Kribel	Kresge won with birdie on third extra hole

== Results in major championships ==
Tournament	1989	1990	1991	1992	1993	1994	1995
Masters Tournament		CUT					
U.S. Open	5	T29		CUT	T46		
The Open Championship							T49
PGA Championship			CUT	T9	CUT		T49

Top 10
Did not play

CUT = missed the half-way cut
"T" = tied

== See also ==
- 1985 PGA Tour Qualifying School graduates
- 1989 PGA Tour Qualifying School graduates
