= Jason Buha =

American professional golfer (born 1975)

Personal information
- Full name: Jason Paul Buha
- Nationality: United States
- Born: February 6, 1975 (age 51) Dearborn, Michigan, U.S.
- Height: 6 ft 0 in (1.83 m)
- Weight: 185 lb (84 kg; 13.2 st)
- Children: Claire, Laura Burr

Career
- Sport: Golf
- College: Duke University
- Turned professional: 1997
- Former tours: PGA Tour; Nationwide Tour; NGA Hooters Tour
- Professional wins: 2

Number of wins by tour
- Korn Ferry Tour: 1

Best results in major championships
- Masters Tournament: DNP
- PGA Championship: DNP
- U.S. Open: CUT: 2000
- The Open Championship: DNP

Jason Paul Buha (born February 6, 1975) is an American professional golfer who played on the PGA Tour and the Nationwide Tour.

== Professional career ==
In 1997, he turned pro. Buha joined the PGA Tour in 2000, earning his card through qualifying school. He struggled during his rookie year on Tour and was unable to retain his Tour card. He joined the Nationwide Tour in 2001 where he recorded four top-10 finishes. The following year he recorded seven top-10 finishes and won the Dayton Open en route to an 11th-place finish on the money list, good enough for a PGA Tour card for 2003. He struggled in his return to the PGA Tour and returned to the Nationwide Tour in 2004. In his return to the Nationwide Tour he recorded five top-10 finished including two runner-up finishes. He would continue to play on the Nationwide Tour until 2006.

Buha was the head coach for the golf team at Birmingham–Southern College from 2009 to 2013 and is now the Assistant Director of Financial Aid. He was also an on-course commentator for the Golf Channel. He opened Buha Golf Academy at the Renaissance Ross Bridge Golf Resort and Spa in Birmingham, Alabama in 2007. He closed the Academy to focus on coaching golf and working for Birmingham–Southern College.

== Personal life ==
Buha currently lives in Mountain Brook, Alabama (a suburb of Birmingham).

== Amateur wins ==
- 1996 Eastern Amateur

== Professional wins (2) ==
=== Nationwide Tour wins (1) ===
No.	Date	Tournament	Winning score	Margin of victory	Runners-up
1	Jul 14, 2002	Dayton Open	−23 (66-67-66-66=265)	3 strokes	(United States) Todd Barranger, (United States) Marco Dawson

Nationwide Tour playoff record (0–1)

No.	Year	Tournament	Opponents	Result
1	2004	SAS Carolina Classic	(United States) Chris Anderson, (Australia) Paul Gow, (Australia) Brendan Jones	Anderson won with par on eighth extra hole Buha and Gow eliminated by birdie on first hole

=== NGA Hooters Tour wins (1) ===
No.	Date	Tournament	Winning score	Margin of victory	Runners-up
1	Oct 3, 1999	Naturally Fresh Cup	−11 (70-69-70-68=277)	Playoff	(United States) Peter Dyson, (United States) Cliff Kresge

== Results in major championships ==
Tournament	2000
U.S. Open	CUT

CUT = missed the halfway cut
Note: Buha only played in the U.S. Open.

== See also ==
- 1999 PGA Tour Qualifying School graduates
- 2002 Buy.com Tour graduates
