= New Mexico Classic =

Golf tournament

Buy.com New Mexico Classic
Tournament information
- Location: Santa Ana Pueblo, New Mexico
- Established: 1999
- Course: Santa Ana Golf Club
- Par: 70
- Tour: Buy.com Tour
- Format: Stroke play
- Prize fund: US$425,000
- Month played: October
- Final year: 2000

Tournament record score
- Aggregate: 266 Jason Gore (2000)
- To par: −14 as above

Final champion
- (United States) Jason Gore
- Location in the United States Location in New Mexico

The New Mexico Classic was a golf tournament on the Buy.com Tour from 1999 to 2000. It was played at the Santa Ana Golf Club in Santa Ana Pueblo, New Mexico near Albuquerque.

The purse in 2000 was US$425,000, with $76,500 going to the winner.

== Winners ==
Year	Winner	Score	To par	Margin of victory	Runner-up
Buy.com New Mexico Classic
2000	(United States) Jason Gore	266	−14	3 strokes	(United States) Mike Grob
Nike New Mexico Classic
1999	(United States) Dick Mast	267	−13	3 strokes	(United States) Joel Edwards

== See also ==
- New Mexico Charity Classic - an earlier Nike Tour event
