= 2002 Buy.com Tour graduates =

This is a list of players who graduated from the Buy.com Tour in 2002. The top 15 players on the Buy.com Tour's money list in 2002 earned their PGA Tour card for 2003.

	2002 Buy.com Tour		2003 PGA Tour				
Player	Money list rank	Earnings ($)	Starts	Cuts made	Best finish	Money list rank	Earnings ($)
(United States) Patrick Moore*#	1	381,965	3	2	T49	240	19,411
(United States) Arron Oberholser*	2	319,883	25	15	T4	103	619,865
(United States) Doug Barron	3	248,175	32	12	T21 (twice)	168	224,589
(New Zealand) Steven Alker*	4	247,008	30	13	17	163	261,359
(United States) Cliff Kresge	5	245,265	32	18	T6	87	734,667
(United States) Jason Gore	6	241,940	30	12	T20 (twice)	177	208,801
(United States) Todd Fischer*	7	234,777	32	15	3	102	621,398
(United States) Marco Dawson	8	227,590	31	11	T7	107	601,729
(United States) Darron Stiles*	9	222,845	29	17	T11	151	346,694
(Australia) Aaron Baddeley*	10	216,536	20	15	2	73	989,168
(United States) Jason Buha	11	204,938	25	7	T27	219	72,833
(United States) Patrick Sheehan*	12	201,231	32	20	T11	104	618,019
(Australia) Gavin Coles*	13	189,745	28	7	T56	227	55,350
(United States) Tag Ridings*	14	187,494	6	1	T27	234	31,275
(United States) Todd Barranger	15	186,666	31	8	T19	186	158,700

*PGA Tour rookie for 2003.
#Moore received a battlefield promotion to the PGA Tour in 2002 by winning three tournaments on the Buy.com Tour in 2002. On the PGA Tour in 2002 he played one tournament, missing the cut at the Southern Farm Bureau Classic.
T = Tied
Green background indicates the player retained his PGA Tour card for 2004 (finished inside the top 125).
Red background indicates the player did not retain his PGA Tour card for 2004 (finished outside the top 150).

== Runners-up on the PGA Tour in 2003 ==
No.	Date	Player	Tournament	Winner	Winning score	Runner-up score
1	Jan 19	(Australia) Aaron Baddeley lost in two-man playoff	Sony Open in Hawaii	(South Africa) Ernie Els	−16 (66-65-66-67=264)	−16 (66-64-65-69=264)

== See also ==
- 2002 PGA Tour Qualifying School graduates
