= List of golfers with most Korn Ferry Tour wins =

This is a list of golfers who have won four or more events on the Korn Ferry Tour since it was established in 1990.

Many of the players on the list have won events on other tours and unofficial events.

Players under the age of 50 are shown in bold.

This list is up to date as of the June 7, 2026.

Rank	Player	Lifespan	Wins	Winning span
1	(United States) Jason Gore	1974–	7	2000–2010
T2	(United States) Matt Gogel	1971–	6	1996–1999
T2	(Germany) **Stephan Jäger**	1989–	6	2016–2021
T2	(United States) Kevin Johnson	1967–	6	1997–2009
T2	(United States) Sean Murphy	1965–	6	1992–1995
T2	(United States) **Martin Piller**	1985–	6	2010–2017
T7	(United States) Pat Bates	1969–	5	1994–2001
T7	(Australia) Gavin Coles	1968–	5	2002–2011
T7	(United States) Chris Couch	1973–	5	2001–2005
T7	(Australia) Mathew Goggin	1974–	5	1999–2015
T7	(United States) **Ben Kohles**	1990–	5	2012–2026
T7	(United States) Chris Smith	1969–	5	1995–1997
T7	(United States) Darron Stiles	1973–	5	1999–2012
T7	(United States) **Kyle Thompson**	1979–	5	2007–2017
T15	(New Zealand) Steven Alker	1971–	4	2002–2014
T15	(United States) Justin Bolli	1976–	4	2004–2012
T15	(United States) Olin Browne	1959–	4	1991–1996
T15	(United States) Michael Christie	1969–2004	4	1995–1996
T15	(Australia) **Nick Flanagan**	1984–	4	2007–2012
T15	(United States) John Flannery	1962–	4	1991–1992
T15	(United States) **Hunter Haas**	1976–	4	2004–2010
T15	(United States) **Chesson Hadley**	1987–	4	2013–2017
T15	(Canada) Glen Hnatiuk	1965–	4	1992–1999
T15	(United States) Tripp Isenhour	1968–	4	2000–2006
T15	(Wales) Richard Johnson	1972–	4	1999–2007
T15	(United States) Skip Kendall	1964–	4	1994–2012
T15	(United States) Tom Lehman	1959–	4	1990–1991
T15	(United States) Dick Mast	1951–	4	1990–1999
T15	(United States) Joe Ogilvie	1974–	4	1998–2003
T15	(United States) **D. A. Points**	1976–	4	2001–2008
T15	(United States) Fran Quinn	1965–	4	1999–2010
T15	(United States) Hugh Royer III	1964–	4	1993–1995
T15	(United States) **Robby Shelton**	1995–	4	2019–2022
T15	(Australia) **Michael Sim**	1984–	4	2006–2009
T15	(United States) Mike Springer	1965–	4	1990–1992
T15	(United States) **Kevin Stadler**	1980–	4	2004–2006
T15	(United States) Vance Veazey	1965–	4	1998–2009

== See also ==
- List of golfers to achieve a three-win promotion from the Korn Ferry Tour
