= 2000 Buy.com Tour =

Golf tour season

2000 Buy.com Tour season
- Duration: February 3, 2000 – October 29, 2000
- Number of official events: 31
- Most wins: (South Africa) Tim Clark (2) (United States) Kent Jones (2) (United States) Spike McRoy (2)
- Money list: (United States) Spike McRoy
- Player of the Year: (United States) Spike McRoy

The 2000 Buy.com Tour was the 11th season of the Buy.com Tour, the official development tour to the PGA Tour.

== Buy.com title sponsorship ==
In October 1999, it was announced that the tour had signed a title sponsorship agreement with Buy.com, being renamed as the Buy.com Tour.

== Schedule ==
The following table lists official events during the 2000 season.

| Date | Tournament | Location | Purse (US$) | Winner (Note: The number in parentheses after each winner's name is the number of Buy.com Tour events they had won up to and including that tournament. This information is only shown for Buy.com Tour members. It is rare for someone to accumulate many wins on the Buy.com Tour as success at this level usually leads to promotion to the PGA Tour.) | OWGR points | Notes |
|---|---|---|---|---|---|---|
| Feb 6 | Buy.com Florida Classic | Florida | 400,000 | (United States) Fran Quinn (2) | 6 | |
| Feb 13 | Buy.com Lakeland Classic | Florida | 400,000 | (United States) Donnie Hammond (1) | 6 | |
| Mar 5 | Buy.com Mississippi Gulf Coast Open | Mississippi | 400,000 | (United States) Tripp Isenhour (1) | 6 | |
| Mar 19 | Buy.com Monterrey Open | Mexico | 450,000 | (United States) Briny Baird (1) | 6 | |
| Apr 2 | Buy.com Louisiana Open | Louisiana | 450,000 | (United States) Rob McKelvey (1) | 6 | |
| Apr 16 | Buy.com Shreveport Open | Louisiana | 400,000 | (United States) Kent Jones (1) | 6 | |
| Apr 30 | Buy.com South Carolina Classic | South Carolina | 400,000 | (United States) Jeff Gallagher (2) | 6 | |
| May 7 | Buy.com Knoxville Open | Tennessee | 400,000 | (United States) J. J. Henry (1) | 6 | |
| May 14 | Buy.com Richmond Open | Virginia | 400,000 | (United States) Steve Runge (1) | 6 | |
| May 21 | Buy.com Virginia Beach Open | Virginia | 400,000 | (Japan) Ryuji Imada (1) | 6 | New tournament |
| Jun 4 | Buy.com Steamtown Classic | Pennsylvania | 450,000 | (United States) Jeff Hart (1) | 6 | New tournament |
| Jun 11 | Buy.com Dayton Open | Ohio | 425,000 | (Canada) Ian Leggatt (1) | 6 | |
| Jun 18 | Buy.com Cleveland Open | Ohio | 400,000 | (South Africa) Deane Pappas (1) | 6 | |
| Jun 25 | Buy.com Greensboro Open | North Carolina | 400,000 | (United States) Kent Jones (2) | 6 | |
| Jul 2 | Buy.com Carolina Classic | North Carolina | 400,000 | (Australia) Mark Hensby (2) | 6 | |
| Jul 9 | Buy.com Hershey Open | Pennsylvania | 400,000 | (Australia) Paul Gow (2) | 6 | |
| Jul 16 | Buy.com Upstate Classic | South Carolina | 400,000 | (United States) Shane Bertsch (1) | 6 | |
| Jul 23 | Buy.com Wichita Open | Kansas | 400,000 | (United States) Ben Crane (1) | 6 | |
| Jul 30 | Buy.com Dakota Dunes Open | South Dakota | 500,000 | (United States) Spike McRoy (1) | 6 | |
| Aug 6 | Buy.com Omaha Classic | Nebraska | 500,000 | (United States) David Berganio Jr. (3) | 6 | |
| Aug 13 | Buy.com Ozarks Open | Missouri | 425,000 | (United States) Pat Perez (1) | 6 | |
| Aug 20 | Buy.com Fort Smith Classic | Arkansas | 400,000 | (South Africa) Tim Clark (1) | 6 | |
| Aug 27 | Buy.com Permian Basin Open | Texas | 400,000 | (United States) Kevin Johnson (3) | 6 | |
| Sep 3 | Buy.com Utah Classic | Utah | 550,000 | (United States) Andy Morse (1) | 6 | |
| Sep 10 | Buy.com Tri-Cities Open | Washington | 400,000 | (United States) Darron Stiles (2) | 6 | |
| Sep 17 | Buy.com Boise Open | Idaho | 550,000 | (South Africa) Tim Clark (2) | 6 | |
| Sep 24 | Buy.com Oregon Classic | Oregon | 400,000 | (United States) Keoke Cotner (1) | 6 | |
| Oct 1 | Buy.com Monterey Peninsula Classic | California | 450,000 | (Wales) Richard Johnson (2) | 6 | New tournament |
| Oct 8 | Buy.com New Mexico Classic | New Mexico | 425,000 | (United States) Jason Gore (1) | 6 | |
| Oct 15 | Buy.com Inland Empire Open | California | 400,000 | (United States) Scott Petersen (1) | 6 | |
| Oct 29 | Buy.com Tour Championship | Alabama | 550,000 | (United States) Spike McRoy (2) | 6 | Tour Championship |

== Money list ==
The money list was based on prize money won during the season, calculated in U.S. dollars. The top 15 players on the money list earned status to play on the 2001 PGA Tour.

| Position | Player | Prize money ($) |
|---|---|---|
| 1 | (United States) Spike McRoy | 300,638 |
| 2 | (Australia) Mark Hensby | 291,757 |
| 3 | (South Africa) Tim Clark | 288,056 |
| 4 | (United States) Briny Baird | 271,897 |
| 5 | (Canada) Ian Leggatt | 259,724 |

== Awards ==
| Award | Winner | Ref. |
|---|---|---|
| Player of the Year (Jack Nicklaus Trophy) | (United States) Spike McRoy | |
