= Chris Couch =

American professional golfer (born 1973)

Personal information
- Full name: Christian Stratton Couch
- Nationality: United States
- Born: May 1, 1973 (age 53) Fort Lauderdale, Florida, U.S.
- Height: 6 ft 4 in (1.93 m)
- Weight: 225 lb (102 kg; 16.1 st)

Career
- Sport: Golf
- College: University of Florida
- Turned professional: 1995
- Current tour: PGA Tour
- Professional wins: 6

Number of wins by tour
- PGA Tour: 1
- Korn Ferry Tour: 5 (Tied 7th all time)

Best results in major championships
- Masters Tournament: DNP
- PGA Championship: CUT: 2006
- U.S. Open: DNP
- The Open Championship: DNP

Christian Stratton Couch (born May 1, 1973) is an American professional golfer who currently plays on the PGA Tour.

== Early life ==
Couch was born in Fort Lauderdale, Florida. He accepted an athletic scholarship to attend the University of Florida in Gainesville, Florida, where he played for coach Buddy Alexander's Florida Gators men's golf team in National Collegiate Athletic Association (NCAA) competition from 1992 to 1995. As a sophomore, he was a member of the Gators' 1993 NCAA championship team that also included future PGA Tour golfer Brian Gay. During his time as a Gator golfer, the team also won Southeastern Conference (SEC) championships in 1992, 1993 and 1994.

== Professional career ==
In 1995, Couch turned professional. It took him a long time to get established and his first couple of spells on the PGA Tour ended when he failed to win enough money to retain his tour card. He won five times on the Nationwide Tour between 2001 and 2005, and in 2006 he made a breakthrough by winning the PGA Tour's Zurich Classic of New Orleans. He won with a 55-foot chip-in (using a cross-handed grip) after a poor shot out of a difficult lie in a bunker.

A poor 2007 season saw Couch finish 167th on the money list and he did not play in 2008 due to a shoulder injury. He played on the PGA Tour in 2009 and 2010 on a major medical extension. By August 2010, Couch earned enough to satisfy his medical exemption and keep his tour card.

Couch went six years without playing a PGA Tour event due to a back injury before making the cut at the 2018 Valspar Championship with a T68.

== Awards and honors ==
- In 1992, Couch was recognized as the SEC Freshman of the Year.
- In 1993 and 1995, he received All-American honors.

== Professional wins (6) ==
=== PGA Tour wins (1) ===
No.	Date	Tournament	Winning score	Margin of victory	Runners-up
1	Apr 30, 2006	Zurich Classic of New Orleans	−19 (70-70-64-65=269)	1 stroke	(United States) Fred Funk, (United States) Charles Howell III

=== Nationwide Tour wins (5) ===
Legend
Tour Championships (1)
Other Nationwide Tour (4)

No.	Date	Tournament	Winning score	Margin of victory	Runner(s)-up
1	Mar 11, 2001	Buy.com Florida Classic	−15 (67-69-69-64=269)	1 stroke	(United States) Chad Campbell
2	Sep 14, 2003	Oregon Classic	−14 (66-68-71-69=274)	Playoff	(United States) Jason Bohn
3	Nov 2, 2003	Nationwide Tour Championship	−18 (66-67-65-72=270)	3 strokes	(United States) D. J. Brigman
4	May 15, 2005	Rheem Classic	−15 (69-66-70-60=265)	5 strokes	(United States) Troy Matteson
5	Jun 12, 2005	LaSalle Bank Open	−15 (66-67-69-67=269)	4 strokes	(United States) Kevin Durkin, (Australia) Paul Gow, (United States) Mario Tiziani

Nationwide Tour playoff record (1–0)

No.	Year	Tournament	Opponent	Result
1	2003	Oregon Classic	(United States) Jason Bohn	Won with birdie on first extra hole

== Results in major championships ==
Tournament	2006
PGA Championship	CUT

CUT = missed the half-way cut
Note: Couch only played in the PGA Championship.

== Results in The Players Championship ==
Tournament	2007	2008	2009	2010	2011	2012
The Players Championship	CUT			T17	T50	T23

Did not play

CUT = missed the halfway cut
"T" indicates a tie for a place

== Results in World Golf Championships ==
Tournament	2006
Match Play	
Championship	
Invitational	T68

Did not play

"T" = Tied

== See also ==
- 1998 PGA Tour Qualifying School graduates
- 2003 Nationwide Tour graduates
- 2005 Nationwide Tour graduates
- List of Florida Gators men's golfers on the PGA Tour
- List of golfers with most Web.com Tour wins
