= Todd Fischer (golfer) =

American professional golfer (born 1969)

Personal information
- Nationality: United States
- Born: August 23, 1969 (age 57) Columbus, Ohio, U.S.
- Height: 6 ft 0 in (1.83 m)
- Weight: 160 lb (73 kg; 11 st)

Career
- Sport: Golf
- College: University of San Francisco
- Turned professional: 1993
- Former tours: PGA Tour; Nationwide Tour
- Professional wins: 6

Number of wins by tour
- Korn Ferry Tour: 1
- Other: 5

Best results in major championships
- Masters Tournament: DNP
- PGA Championship: DNP
- U.S. Open: CUT: 2000, 2001, 2007
- The Open Championship: DNP

Todd Fischer (born August 23, 1969) is an American professional golfer.

== Career ==
Fischer was born in Columbus, Ohio. He played college golf at the University of San Francisco, where he won two events.

Fischer played on the Nationwide Tour and PGA Tour from 2001 to 2011. On the Nationwide Tour, 2001–02 and 2007–11, his best finish was a win at the 2002 Fort Smith Classic. On the PGA Tour, 2003–06, He had four third-place finishes: 3rd at the 2003 Greater Hartford Open, T-3 at the 2004 B.C. Open, T-3 at the 2004 Valero Texas Open, and 3rd at 2005 Reno-Tahoe Open.

== Amateur wins ==
- 1992 Pacific Coast Amateur

== Professional wins (6) ==
=== Nationwide Tour wins (1) ===
No.	Date	Tournament	Winning score	Margin of victory	Runners-up
1	Jul 21, 2002	Fort Smith Classic	−11 (65-67-68-69=269)	1 stroke	(United States) Doug Barron, (Australia) Gavin Coles, (United States) Andy Sanders

=== Other wins (5) ===
- 1998 Long Beach Open
- 1999 California State Open
- 2000 Utah Open, Long Beach Open
- 2009 Northern California Open

== See also ==
- 2002 Buy.com Tour graduates
