= 2003 Nationwide Tour =

Golf tour season

2003 Nationwide Tour season
- Duration: February 27, 2003 – November 2, 2003
- Number of official events: 30
- Most wins: (United States) Tom Carter (3)
- Money list: (United States) Zach Johnson
- Player of the Year: (United States) Zach Johnson

The 2003 Nationwide Tour was the 14th season of the Nationwide Tour, the official development tour to the PGA Tour.

== Nationwide title sponsorship ==
In July 2002, it was announced that the tour had signed a title sponsorship agreement with the Nationwide Mutual Insurance Company, being renamed as the Nationwide Tour.

== Schedule ==
The following table lists official events during the 2003 season.

| Date | Tournament | Location | Purse (US$) | Winner (Note: The number in parentheses after each winner's name is the number of Nationwide Tour events they had won up to and including that tournament. This information is only shown for Nationwide Tour members. It is rare for someone to accumulate many wins on the Nationwide Tour as success at this level usually leads to promotion to the PGA Tour.) | OWGR points | Other tours (Note: ANZ − PGA Tour of Australasia.) | Notes |
|---|---|---|---|---|---|---|---|
| Mar 2 | Jacob's Creek Open | Australia | 500,000 | (United States) Joe Ogilvie (3) | 12 | ANZ | |
| Mar 9 | Clearwater Classic | New Zealand | 500,000 | (United States) Ryan Palmer (1) | 12 | ANZ | |
| Mar 30 | Chitimacha Louisiana Open | Louisiana | 475,000 | (United States) Brett Wetterich (1) | 6 | | |
| Apr 20 | First Tee Arkansas Classic | Arkansas | 475,000 | (United States) Ted Purdy (1) | 6 | | |
| Apr 27 | Rheem Classic | Arkansas | 475,000 | (United States) Zach Johnson (1) | 6 | | |
| May 4 | BMW Charity Pro-Am | South Carolina | 575,000 | (United States) Tripp Isenhour (2) | 6 | | Pro-Am |
| May 18 | VB Open | Virginia | 450,000 | (New Zealand) Michael Long (2) | 6 | | |
| May 25 | SAS Carolina Classic | North Carolina | 500,000 | (Canada) David Morland IV (2) | 6 | | |
| Jun 8 | LaSalle Bank Open | Illinois | 500,000 | (Australia) Andre Stolz (1) | 6 | | |
| Jun 15 | Northeast Pennsylvania Classic | Pennsylvania | 450,000 | (United States) Blaine McCallister (1) | 6 | | |
| Jun 22 | Lake Erie Charity Classic | New York | 450,000 | (United States) Guy Boros (2) | 6 | | |
| Jun 29 | Knoxville Open | Tennessee | 475,000 | (United States) Vaughn Taylor (1) | 6 | | |
| Jul 6 | Samsung Canadian PGA Championship | Canada | 450,000 | (United States) Tom Carter (1) | 6 | | |
| Jul 13 | Reese's Cup Classic | Pennsylvania | 450,000 | (United States) Joe Ogilvie (4) | 6 | | |
| Jul 20 | Henrico County Open | Virginia | 450,000 | (Australia) Mark Hensby (3) | 6 | | |
| Jul 27 | Dayton Open | Ohio | 450,000 | (United States) Guy Boros (3) | 6 | | |
| Aug 3 | Chattanooga Classic | Tennessee | 450,000 | (United States) Jason Bohn (1) | 6 | | New tournament |
| Aug 10 | Omaha Classic | Nebraska | 550,000 | (United States) Bo Van Pelt (1) | 6 | | |
| Aug 17 | Price Cutter Charity Championship | Missouri | 525,000 | (United States) Tom Carter (2) | 6 | | |
| Aug 24 | Preferred Health Systems Wichita Open | Kansas | 475,000 | (United States) Jeff Klauk (1) | 6 | | |
| Aug 31 | Alberta Calgary Classic | Canada | 450,000 | (United States) Tom Carter (3) (Note: Carter earned immediate promotion to the PGA Tour, as this was his third win of the season.) | 6 | | New tournament |
| Sep 7 | Envirocare Utah Classic | Utah | 450,000 | (United States) Zach Johnson (2) | 6 | | |
| Sep 14 | Oregon Classic | Oregon | 450,000 | (United States) Chris Couch (2) | 6 | | |
| Sep 21 | Albertsons Boise Open | Idaho | 600,000 | (United States) Roger Tambellini (1) | 6 | | |
| Sep 28 | Mark Christopher Charity Classic | California | 450,000 | (United States) James Oh (1) | 6 | | |
| Oct 5 | Monterey Peninsula Classic | California | 450,000 | (United States) Scott Gutschewski (1) | 6 | | |
| Oct 12 | Gila River Classic | Arizona | 475,000 | (United States) Lucas Glover (1) | 6 | | |
| Oct 19 | Permian Basin Charity Golf Classic | Texas | 450,000 | (United States) D. J. Brigman (1) | 6 | | |
| Oct 26 | Miccosukee Championship | Florida | 500,000 | (United States) Craig Bowden (2) | 6 | | New tournament |
| Nov 2 | Nationwide Tour Championship | Alabama | 625,000 | (United States) Chris Couch (3) | 6 | | Tour Championship |

== Money list ==
The money list was based on prize money won during the season, calculated in U.S. dollars. The top 20 players on the money list earned status to play on the 2004 PGA Tour.

| Position | Player | Prize money ($) |
|---|---|---|
| 1 | (United States) Zach Johnson | 494,882 |
| 2 | (United States) Joe Ogilvie | 392,337 |
| 3 | (United States) Tom Carter | 360,990 |
| 4 | (United States) Chris Couch | 342,874 |
| 5 | (United States) Bo Van Pelt | 289,248 |

== Awards ==
| Award | Winner | Ref. |
|---|---|---|
| Player of the Year (Jack Nicklaus Trophy) | (United States) Zach Johnson | |
