= Arron Oberholser =

American professional golfer (born 1975)

Personal information
- Full name: Arron Matthew Oberholser
- Nationality: United States
- Born: February 2, 1975 (age 51) San Luis Obispo, California, U.S.
- Height: 6 ft 0 in (1.83 m)
- Weight: 185 lb (84 kg; 13.2 st)

Career
- Sport: Golf
- College: San Jose State University
- Turned professional: 1998
- Former tours: PGA Tour; Nationwide Tour; Canadian Tour
- Professional wins: 6
- Highest ranking: 22 (September 2, 2007)

Number of wins by tour
- PGA Tour: 1
- Korn Ferry Tour: 2
- Other: 3

Best results in major championships
- Masters Tournament: T14: 2006
- PGA Championship: T4: 2007
- U.S. Open: T9: 2005
- The Open Championship: T45: 2007

Arron Matthew Oberholser (born February 2, 1975) is an American professional golfer and an analyst and commentator for the Golf Channel.

== Early life and amateur career ==
Oberholser was born in San Luis Obispo, California. He attended San Jose State University. In 1996, as a junior, he won six college golf titles during the regular season, matching Tiger Woods, a sophomore at Stanford University. In the 1996 postseason, competing for college Player of the Year, Woods won the regionals and the NCAA Championship, while Oberholser finished second in every statistical category.

== Professional career ==
Oberholser turned professional in 1998. In 1999 he became an assistant coach for the golf program at Santa Clara University. He played on the Canadian Tour in 1999 and 2000, finishing second on the Order of Merit in 2000. In December 2000, at the final round of PGA Qualifying School, he finished one stroke short of qualifying for a PGA Tour card.

In 2001 Oberholser was a member of the second-tier tour in North America, the Nationwide Tour, but only competed three times due to a wrist injury. That year he had surgery to remove a bone chip from his right hand.

In 2002 Oberholser finished second on the Nationwide Tour money list and won a place on the elite PGA Tour. In his first three seasons on the PGA Tour, he played well enough to retain his card; in those years his best finish was second at the 2004 Wachovia Championship, where he lost in a playoff. In November 2004, he won the Shinhan Korea Golf Championship, a PGA Tour-sanctioned "Challenge Season" event.

In February 2006, Oberholser won a PGA Tour event, the AT&T Pebble Beach National Pro-Am. In May, he shot a round of 60, 10-under par, to set a record at the Byron Nelson Championship. 2006 was his best season: he made 20 of 23 cuts, had 13 top-25 finishes, and ended the year 23rd on the PGA Tour money list.

Despite injuring his back early in 2007, by September of that year Oberholser was number 22 in the Official World Golf Ranking. In October 2007, he had surgery to remove a bone chip from his left hand; he had hurt the hand in April, but the need for surgery hadn't been identified then. He played in only 10 events in 2008, having hand surgery in July 2008, and only four events in 2009. In his final event of the year in October 2009, the Frys.com Open, Oberholser placed 33rd.

Oberholser had a medical exemption for 2010, making him eligible to play in at least 14 events, but he had two more surgeries in May and October 2010. He did not play in 2010 or 2011.

In 2012, Oberholser played in two PGA Tour events. In the first, the Waste Management Phoenix Open, in early February, he missed the cut by one stroke. In the second, the AT&T Pebble Beach National Pro-Am, in March, he withdrew after rounds of 70 and 69.

In 2013, Oberholser played in two PGA Tour events. In February, he missed the cut at the Northern Trust Open by eight shots. With his left arm bothering him badly, he said "I can't tell you that I'm going to continue playing. I'm in a pretty precarious position, potentially looking at the end of my career.” In March, he missed the cut at the Shell Houston Open by two shots. In September 2013, he tried to get back to the PGA Tour through the Web.com Tour Finals (those with medical extensions were allowed to compete in the series of tournaments), but was forced to withdraw after a hand injury. In late 2013, Oberholser was told that he had a bone spur on the scaphoid, a bone near his wrist, which was causing very low blood flood in the region, and that surgery was risky.

In 2013, as injuries impacted his playing career, Oberholser began working as a part-time analyst for the Golf Channel. He is currently a part-time commentator and analyst for that television channel. He is also a co-host of the Center Cut Golf Podcast with PGATour.com's Senior Editor, Sean Martin.

== Personal life ==
In 2007, Oberholser married golfer Angie Rizzo, whom he had met on a driving range. She cut short her playing career as a LPGA professional because of lingering effects of back injuries from a car crash.

== Amateur wins ==
- 1997 Sahalee Players Championship
- 1998 Eastern Amateur

== Professional wins (6) ==
=== PGA Tour wins (1) ===
No.	Date	Tournament	Winning score	Margin of victory	Runner-up
1	Feb 12, 2006	AT&T Pebble Beach National Pro-Am	−17 (65-68-66-72=271)	5 strokes	(South Africa) Rory Sabbatini

PGA Tour playoff record (0–1)

No.	Year	Tournament	Opponent	Result
1	2004	Wachovia Championship	(United States) Joey Sindelar	Lost to par on second extra hole

=== Buy.com Tour wins (2) ===
No.	Date	Tournament	Winning score	Margin of victory	Runner(s)-up
1	Jun 9, 2002	Samsung Canadian PGA Championship	−16 (70-70-62-66=268)	2 strokes	(United States) Doug Barron
2	Sep 8, 2002	Utah Classic	−14 (71-64-67=202) (Note: Shortened to 54 holes due to weather.)	2 strokes	(United States) Doug Barron, (United States) Brian Claar

Buy.com Tour playoff record (0–1)

No.	Year	Tournament	Opponent	Result
1	2002	Virginia Beach Open	(United States) Cliff Kresge	Lost to eagle on second extra hole

=== Canadian Tour wins (2) ===
No.	Date	Tournament	Winning score	Margin of victory	Runner(s)-up
1	Jul 18, 1999	Ontario Open Heritage Classic	−20 (66-66-65-67=264)	11 strokes	(Australia) Tony Carolan, (Canada) Ian Leggatt
2	Aug 8, 1999	Eagle Creek Classic	−18 (69-64-70-67=270)	3 strokes	(Hong Kong) Scott Rowe

=== Other wins (1) ===
No.	Date	Tournament	Winning score	Margin of victory	Runners-up
1	Nov 28, 2004	Shinhan Korea Golf Championship	−4 (72-73-70-69=284)	2 strokes	(Spain) Miguel Ángel Jiménez, (United States) Kevin Na

== Results in major championships ==
Tournament	2004	2005	2006	2007	2008
Masters Tournament			T14	58	T25
U.S. Open		T9	T16	CUT	
The Open Championship			CUT	T45	
PGA Championship	T13	T28	CUT	T4	

Top 10
Did not play

CUT = missed the half-way cut
"T" = tied

== Results in The Players Championship ==
Tournament	2004	2005	2006	2007
The Players Championship	T66	T27	T45	T64

"T" indicates a tie for a place

== Results in World Golf Championships ==
Tournament	2006	2007	2008
Match Play	R32	R64	R32
Championship	12	T45	T51
Invitational	T10	T14	

Top 10
Did not play

QF, R16, R32, R64 = Round in which player lost in match play
"T" = Tied

== See also ==
- 2002 Buy.com Tour graduates
