= Zoran Zorkic =

Serbian American golfer

Personal information
- Nationality: Australia (until 1994); United States (1994–present)
- Born: September 5, 1966 (age 60) Donji Petrovci, Yugoslavia
- Height: 6 ft 2 in (1.88 m)
- Weight: 220 lb (100 kg; 16 st)

Career
- Sport: Golf
- College: University of Houston
- Turned professional: 1989
- Former tours: Nationwide Tour; NGA Hooters Tour
- Professional wins: 8

Number of wins by tour
- Korn Ferry Tour: 1
- Other: 7

Best results in major championships
- Masters Tournament: DNP
- PGA Championship: DNP
- U.S. Open: CUT: 2000
- The Open Championship: DNP

Zoran Zorkic (born Zoran Zorkić; September 5, 1966) is a Serbian-born golfer who grew up in Australia and has played primarily in the United States. He has played extensively on the PGA Tour's developmental tour, the Nationwide Tour.

== Early life and amateur career ==
Zorkic was born in Donji Petrovci, Yugoslavia (present-day Serbia). His family moved to Australia when he was five years old.

Zorkic then moved to the United States where he attended the University of Houston, later becoming an All-American.

== Professional career ==
In 2000, Zorkic joined the Nationwide Tour. He won the SAS Carolina Classic in 2002, his only victory on Tour. He played on the Nationwide Tour until 2009.

He also won four events on the NGA Hooters Tour. He is currently a golf coach in Houston.

== Professional wins (8) ==
=== Buy.com Tour wins (1) ===
No.	Date	Tournament	Winning score	Margin of victory	Runner-up
1	May 19, 2002	SAS Carolina Classic	−10 (70-67-66-71=274)	1 stroke	(United States) Doug Barron

=== NGA Hooters Tour wins (4) ===
No.	Date	Tournament	Winning score	Margin of victory	Runner(s)-up
1	Aug 12, 1990	Greater Montgomery Open	−17 (65-68-69-71=271)	2 strokes	(United States) John McGough
2	Sep 14, 1997	Hooters Classic (The Champions Club)	−14 (72-66-74-62=274)	Playoff	(United States) Henry Diana, (United States) Tyler Williamson
3	Jun 7, 1998	Delta Pontiac Performers Golf Classic	−21 (65-66-67-69=267)	1 stroke	(United States) Bob Heintz
4	Mar 21, 1999	Hooters Classic (Windermere Club)	−15 (67-69-71-66=273)	Playoff	(United States) Tommy Biershenk

=== Ninfa's Texas Tour wins (2) ===
- 1992 Cypresswood tournament
- 1993 ProGear Texas Classic

=== Other wins (1) ===
No.	Date	Tournament	Winning score	Margin of victory	Runner-up
1	Oct 15, 1989	Queensland PGA Championship	−11 (73-67-67-70=277)	1 stroke	(Australia) Terry Price

== Results in major championships ==
Tournament	2000
U.S. Open	CUT

CUT = missed the half-way cut
Note: Zorkic only played in the U.S. Open.

== Team appearances ==
Amateur

- Australian Men's Interstate Teams Matches (representing Queensland): 1985, 1986, 1988
