= Spike McRoy =

American professional golfer (born 1968)

Personal information
- Full name: Robert Lynn McRoy Jr.
- Nickname: Spike
- Nationality: United States
- Born: May 20, 1968 (age 58) Huntsville, Alabama, U.S.
- Height: 5 ft 11 in (1.80 m)

Career
- Sport: Golf
- College: University of Alabama
- Turned professional: 1991
- Former tours: PGA Tour; Buy.com Tour; NGA Hooters Tour
- Professional wins: 7

Number of wins by tour
- PGA Tour: 1
- Korn Ferry Tour: 2
- Other: 4

Best results in major championships
- Masters Tournament: DNP
- PGA Championship: CUT: 2002
- U.S. Open: T40: 2004
- The Open Championship: CUT: 2004

Achievements and awards
- Buy.com Tour money list winner: 2000
- Buy.com Tour Player of the Year: 2000

Robert Lynn "Spike" McRoy Jr. (born May 20, 1968) is an American professional golfer who has played on the PGA Tour and the Nationwide Tour.

== Early life ==
McRoy was born and raised in Huntsville, Alabama. He got his nickname Spike from his great uncle, a Ty Cobb fan, who sent McRoy a miniature Detroit Tigers uniform when he was born. Cobb was known for his aggressive base running – often "spiking" opposing infielders as he rounded the bases. McRoy graduated from Virgil I. Grissom High School in 1986.

== Amateur career ==
He attended the University of Alabama graduating with a bachelor's degree in corporate finance in 1991. He was on the Alabama Crimson Tide golf team while there.

== Professional career ==
McRoy turned professional after graduating from the University of Alabama. McRoy has split his playing time between the PGA Tour and the tour's developmental tour relatively equally throughout his career, and has just over a half-dozen top-10 finishes in each tour. He was the top money winner on the Buy.com Tour in 2000 with $300,638 in earnings with victories at the Buy.com Dakota Dunes Open and the Buy.com Tour Championship. In 2002, he captured his first win in a PGA Tour event at the B.C. Open. McRoy last played a full PGA Tour season in 2005 and continues to compete occasionally on the PGA Tour and Web.com Tour.

McRoy was inducted into the Huntsville-Madison County Athletic Hall of Fame in 2009.

== Personal life ==
McRoy is married with three children and lives in Huntsville.

== Professional wins (7) ==
=== PGA Tour wins (1) ===
No.	Date	Tournament	Winning score	Margin of victory	Runner-up
1	Jul 21, 2002	B.C. Open	−19 (70-65-69-65=269)	1 stroke	(United States) Fred Funk

=== Buy.com Tour wins (2) ===
Legend
Tour Championships (1)
Other Buy.com Tour (1)

No.	Date	Tournament	Winning score	Margin of victory	Runner-up
1	Jul 30, 2000	Buy.com Dakota Dunes Open	−18 (67-67-68-68=270)	1 stroke	(United States) Mike Schuchart
2	Oct 29, 2000	Buy.com Tour Championship	−16 (74-64-65-69=272)	5 strokes	(United States) Briny Baird

=== NGA Hooters Tour wins (2) ===
No.	Date	Tournament	Winning score	Margin of victory	Runner(s)-up
1	Jun 4, 1995	Collins Pro Classic	−15 (68-70-70-65=273)	3 strokes	(United States) Kyle Flinton
2	Sep 8, 1996	RidgeWood Lakes Classic	−16 (71-67-65-69=272)	4 strokes	(United States) Trey Coker, (United States) Barry Conser, (United States) Dicky Thompson

=== Other wins (2) ===
- 1990 Cajun Classic (as an amateur)
- 1992 Alabama Open

== Results in major championships ==
Tournament	1997	1998	1999	2000	2001	2002	2003	2004
U.S. Open	CUT		T53			65	CUT	T40
The Open Championship								CUT
PGA Championship						CUT		

Note: McRoy never played in the Masters Tournament.

Did not play

CUT = missed the half-way cut
"T" = tied

== Results in The Players Championship ==
Tournament	2003	2004
The Players Championship	CUT	T66

CUT = missed the halfway cut
"T" indicates a tie for a place

== See also ==
- 1996 PGA Tour Qualifying School graduates
- 1997 PGA Tour Qualifying School graduates
- 2000 Buy.com Tour graduates

== See also ==
- Alabama Crimson Tide golf
