= Todd Barranger =

American professional golfer

Personal information
- Nationality: United States
- Born: October 19, 1968 (age 58) Elmer, New Jersey, U.S.
- Height: 5 ft 10 in (1.78 m)
- Weight: 175 lb (79 kg; 12.5 st)
- Spouse: Bailey Barranger
- Children: 4

Career
- Sport: Golf
- College: Scottsdale Community College
- Turned professional: 1991
- Former tours: PGA Tour; Asia Golf Circuit; Nationwide Tour
- Professional wins: 2

Number of wins by tour
- Korn Ferry Tour: 1
- Other: 1

Best results in major championships
- Masters Tournament: DNP
- PGA Championship: DNP
- U.S. Open: CUT: 1994
- The Open Championship: DNP

Todd Barranger (born October 19, 1968) is an American professional golfer who played on the PGA Tour, Asia Golf Circuit and the Nationwide Tour.

== Professional career ==
In 1994, Barranger joined the PGA Tour. He wasn't able to retain his card though. Due to his inabiltity to secure his card he played on the Nike Tour, the PGA Tour's developmental tour, and the Asia Golf Circuit. In 1996, he won the Thailand Open.

In 1995 and 1996, he played in a limited amount of Nike Tour, the tour's developmental tour, due to being diagnosed with testicular cancer. After beating the condition, he re-joined the Nationwide Tour in 1997 but had to take a break from golf in 1998 and 1999 after the cancer re-emerged.

In 2000, Barranger returned to golf, splitting his time between the PGA Tour and the developmental tour. In 2001, he played on the Buy.com Tour, the name of the developmental tour at the time, full-time and picked up his first victory at the Buy.com Dayton Open. In 2002, he recorded seven top-10 finishes including a runner-up and a third-place finish en route to a 15th-place finish on the money list, earning him his PGA Tour card for 2003.

In 2003, Barranger was diagnosed with cancer for the third time midway through the PGA Tour season and it took a toll on his performance. In 2004, he returned to the developmental tour where he would play through 2005.

== Professional wins (2) ==
=== Asia Golf Circuit wins (1) ===
No.	Date	Tournament	Winning score	Margin of victory	Runner-up
1	Feb 11, 1996	Thai Airways Thailand Open	−17 (69-69-65-68=271)	5 strokes	(United States) Rob Moss

=== Buy.com Tour wins (1) ===
No.	Date	Tournament	Winning score	Margin of victory	Runner-up
1	Jun 24, 2001	Buy.com Dayton Open	−26 (64-66-67-65=262)	1 stroke	(United States) Bo Van Pelt

== Results in major championships ==
Tournament	1994
U.S. Open	CUT

CUT = missed the half-way cut
Note: Barranger only played in the U.S. Open.

== See also ==
- 1993 PGA Tour Qualifying School graduates
- 2002 Buy.com Tour graduates
