= Ricky Barnes =

American professional golfer (born 1981)

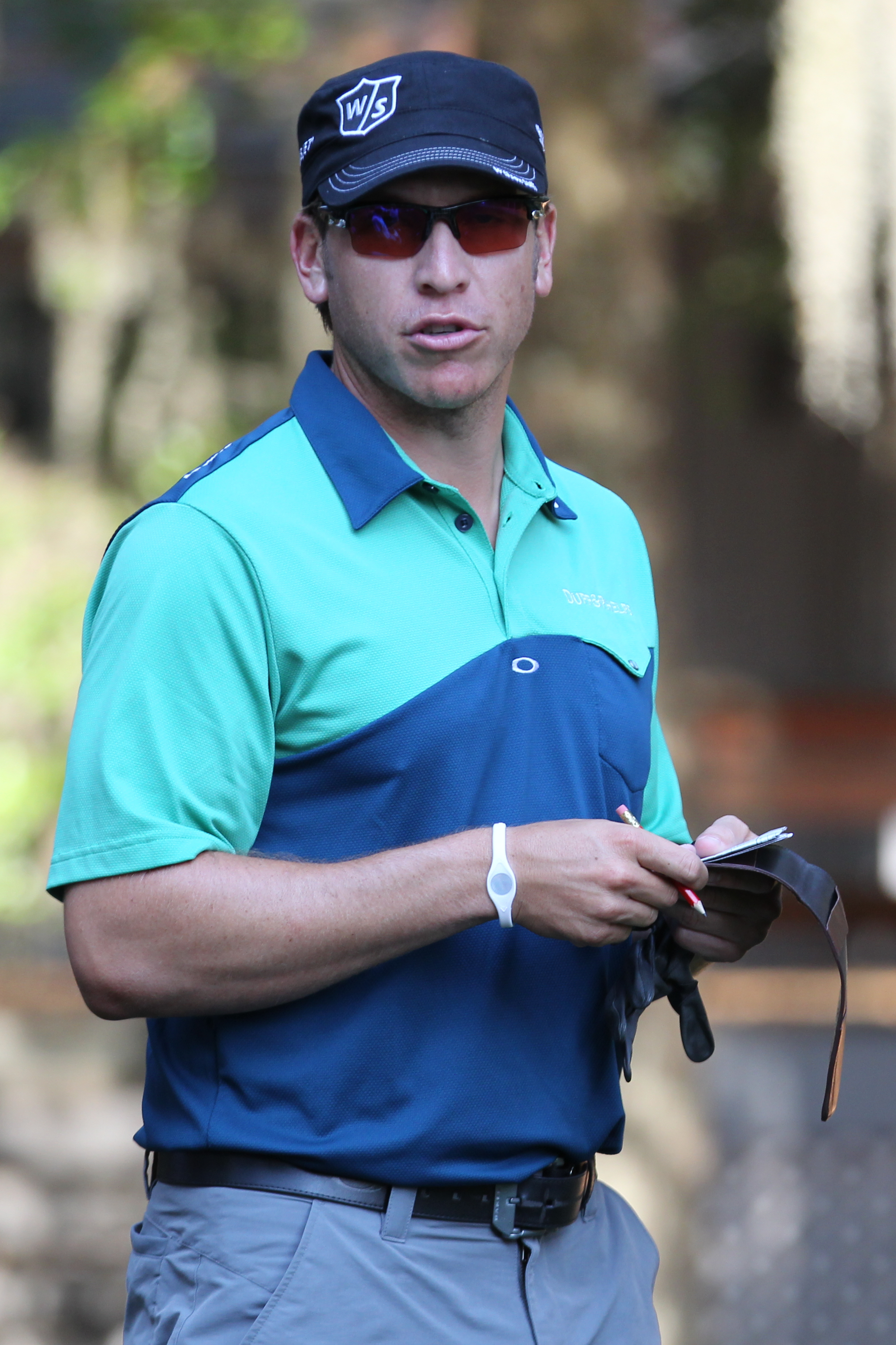

Personal information
- Full name: Richard Kyle Barnes
- Nationality: United States
- Born: February 6, 1981 (age 45) Stockton, California, U.S.
- Height: 6 ft 2 in (1.88 m)
- Weight: 200 lb (91 kg; 14 st)
- Spouse: Suzanne Stonebarger
- Children: Brady

Career
- Sport: Golf
- College: University of Arizona
- Turned professional: 2003
- Current tours: PGA Tour (veteran member status)
- Former tours: Nationwide Tour; PGA Tour of Australasia
- Professional wins: 1
- Highest ranking: 58 (July 25, 2010)

Best results in major championships
- Masters Tournament: T10: 2010
- PGA Championship: T56: 2011
- U.S. Open: T2: 2009
- The Open Championship: T44: 2010

Achievements and awards
- Ben Hogan Award: 2003

Richard Kyle Barnes (born February 6, 1981) is an American professional golfer who currently plays on the PGA Tour.

== Early life and amateur career ==
Barnes was born in Stockton, California. His father, Bruce Barnes, was a punter who played with the New England Patriots of the National Football League.

Barnes played college golf at the University of Arizona from 2000 to 2003. During that time he was named the Pac-10 Freshman of the Year in 2000, Pac-10 Co-Player of the Year in 2001, second-team All-American in 2000 and 2001 and first-team All-American in 2003.

In 2002, Barnes won the 102nd U.S. Amateur, defeating Hunter Mahan 2 & 1 in the final. Barnes and Mahan would share the 2003 Ben Hogan Award and would lead the United States to victory at the 2002 Eisenhower Trophy. In 2003 he was the low amateur at The Masters, where he finished 21st after outscoring his playing partner, Tiger Woods, by seven shots in the opening round.

== Professional career ==
Barnes turned professional in 2003 and joined the Nationwide Tour in 2004. His best finish in that venue came at the 2006 Oregon Classic when he lost to Cliff Kresge in a playoff. Barnes finished in the 25th spot on the 2008 Nationwide Tour money list which earned him his PGA Tour card for 2009.

At the 2009 U.S. Open, Barnes set the 36-hole scoring record after shooting an 8-under 132 through the first two rounds in soft, rainy conditions. Early in the 3rd round, he became only the fourth player ever to reach double-digits under par. Barnes, however, suffered a collapse in the final round, shooting a 76 (+6) and placing in a tie for 2nd, two shots behind winner, Lucas Glover. The runner-up finish at the U.S. Open was his only top-25 finish in 2009, but he retained his tour card for 2010 by finishing 120th.

In 2010, a string of top 10 finishes helped Barnes to comfortably keep his card, and he finished 43rd on the money list.

In January 2011 Barnes signed a contract with G/FORE, a golf company from fashion designer Mossimo Giannulli, to exclusively wear the G/FORE colored glove on the PGA Tour.

After playing well enough to retain his card in 2011 and 2012, he slipped to 130th on the money list in 2013 and also missed the FedEx Cup playoffs (ranked 132). He played in the Web.com Tour Finals and finished 33rd to retain his PGA Tour card for 2014.

At the 2016 Valero Texas Open, Barnes held the 54-hole lead/co-lead for only the third time in his PGA Tour career, after shooting a third round of 67 to lead by one stroke. He closed with a 74 in the final round and finished in a tie for 4th. He finished the 2015-2016 season 139th on the FedEx Cup points list.

From 2017 to 2022, Barnes has been unable to finish inside the top 150 of the FedEx Cup points list. He has now played in over 330 events on the PGA Tour without a victory, although he has earned $8.8 million in total prize money, as of August 2022.

== Personal life ==
Barnes is married to pro beach volleyball player, Suzanne Stonebarger.

== Awards and honors ==
In 2003, Barnes shared the Ben Hogan Award with Hunter Mahan

== Amateur wins ==
- 2002 U.S. Amateur

== Professional wins (1) ==
=== Other wins (1) ===
No.	Date	Tournament	Winning score	To par	Margin of victory	Runners-up
1	Jun 29, 2010	CVS Caremark Charity Classic (with (United States) J. B. Holmes)	63-58=121	−21	2 strokes	(United States) Hunter Mahan and (Norway) Suzann Pettersen

== Playoff record ==
Nationwide Tour playoff record (0–1)

No.	Year	Tournament	Opponent	Result
1	2006	Oregon Classic	(United States) Cliff Kresge	Lost to par on third extra hole

== Results in major championships ==
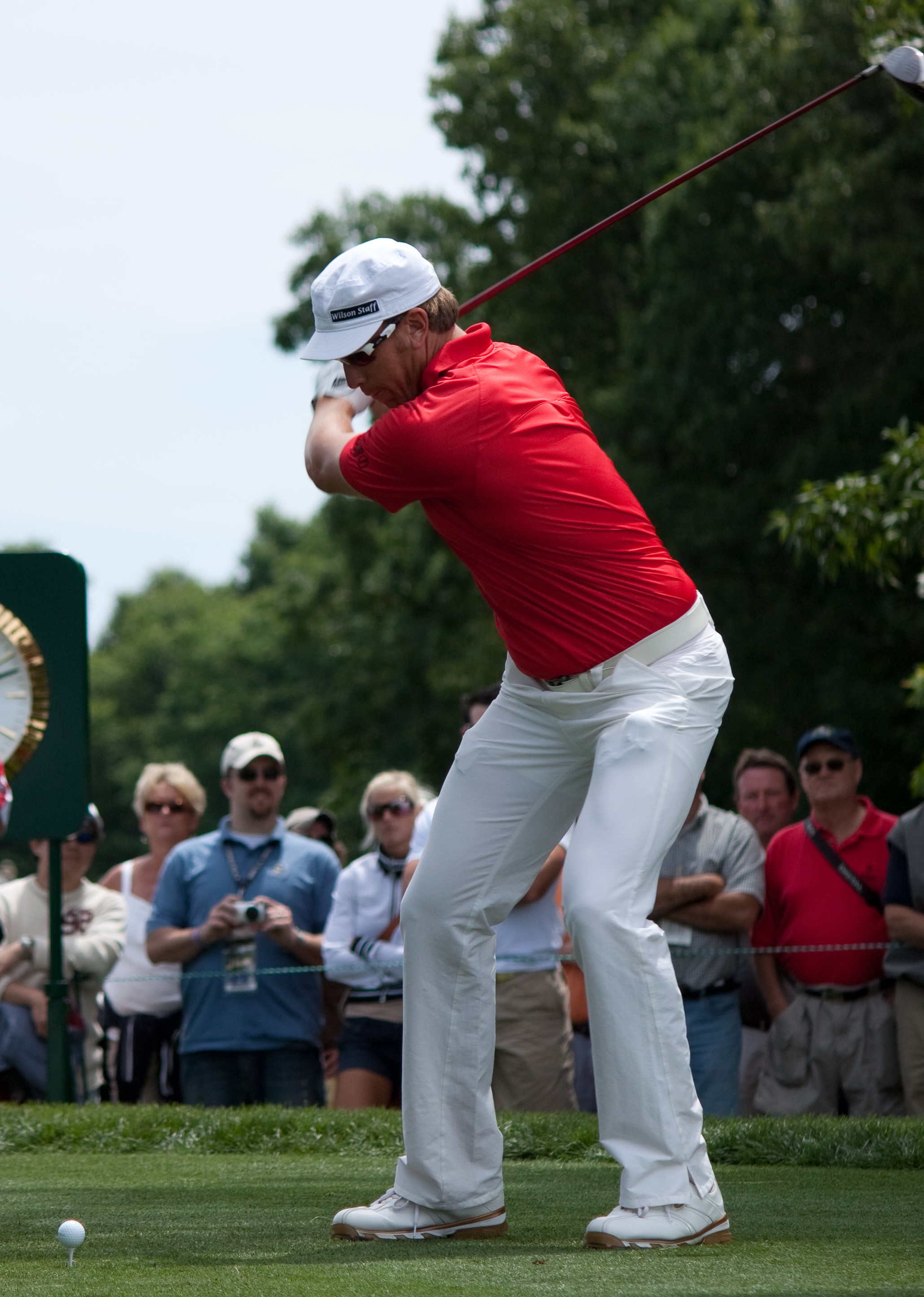
Barnes at the 2009 U.S. Open.

Tournament	2000	2001	2002	2003	2004	2005	2006	2007	2008	2009
Masters Tournament				21LA						
U.S. Open	CUT		CUT	T59				CUT		T2
The Open Championship				CUT						
PGA Championship										

Tournament	2010	2011
Masters Tournament	T10	T20
U.S. Open	T27	
The Open Championship	T44	T57
PGA Championship	CUT	T56

Top 10
Did not play

LA = Low amateur
CUT = missed the half-way cut
"T" = tied

=== Summary ===
Tournament	Wins	2nd	3rd	Top-5	Top-10	Top-25	Events	Cuts made
Masters Tournament	0	0	0	0	1	3	3	3
U.S. Open	0	1	0	1	1	1	6	3
The Open Championship	0	0	0	0	0	0	3	2
PGA Championship	0	0	0	0	0	0	2	1
Totals	0	1	0	1	2	4	14	9

- Most consecutive cuts made – 4 (2009 U.S. Open – 2010 Open Championship)
- Longest streak of top-10s – 2 (2009 U.S. Open – 2010 Masters)

== U.S. national team appearances ==
Amateur

- Eisenhower Trophy: 2002 (winners)

== See also ==
- 2008 Nationwide Tour graduates
- 2013 Web.com Tour Finals graduates
- 2015 Web.com Tour Finals graduates
