= Darron Stiles =

American golfer (born 1973)

Personal information
- Full name: Darron Gary Stiles
- Nationality: United States
- Born: June 1, 1973 (age 53) St. Petersburg, Florida, U.S.
- Height: 6 ft 3 in (1.91 m)
- Weight: 215 lb (98 kg; 15.4 st)

Career
- Sport: Golf
- College: Florida Southern College
- Turned professional: 1995
- Former tours: PGA Tour; PGA Tour of Australasia; Web.com Tour; NGA Hooters Tour
- Professional wins: 7

Number of wins by tour
- PGA Tour of Australasia: 1
- Korn Ferry Tour: 5 (Tied-7th all-time)
- Other: 1

Best results in major championships
- Masters Tournament: DNP
- PGA Championship: DNP
- U.S. Open: T48: 2003
- The Open Championship: DNP

Darron Gary Stiles (born June 1, 1973) is an American professional golfer.

== Early life ==
In 1973, Stiles was born in St. Petersburg, Florida. In 1989, Stiles had successful surgery to remove a cancerous tumor from his jaw.

Stiles was a three-time All-America at Florida Southern College and was a member of the 1995 NCAA Division II National Championship team.

== Professional career ==
In 1995, Stiles turned pro. He played on the Nationwide Tour in 1997, 1999–2002, 2004, and 2008 and the PGA Tour in 2003, 2005–07, and 2009. He gained his PGA Tour card for 2007 by finishing tied for 16th at Q-School in 2006 but failed to retain his card, and returned to the Nationwide Tour in 2008. He finished 7th on the Nationwide Tour money list in 2008 and earned his 2009 PGA Tour card. Stiles is the all-time career money leader through his 2012 win at the News Sentinel Open on the Web.com Tour with $1,815,688.

== Professional wins (7) ==
=== PGA Tour of Australasia wins (1) ===
No.	Date	Tournament	Winning score	Margin of victory	Runner-up
1	Feb 17, 2008	HSBC New Zealand PGA Championship^{1}	−10 (66-68=134) (Note: The 2008 HSBC New Zealand PGA Championship was shortened to 36 holes due to rain. Due to the length of the event this win is not officially recognised as a Nationwide Tour victory.)	1 stroke	(New Zealand) David Smail

^{1}Co-sanctioned by the Nationwide Tour

=== Web.com Tour wins (5) ===
No.	Date	Tournament	Winning score	Margin of victory	Runner(s)-up
1	May 16, 1999	Nike Dominion Open	−9 (67-71-74-67=279)	1 stroke	(Australia) Mathew Goggin, (United States) Dick Mast
2	Sep 10, 2000	Buy.com Tri-Cities Open	−6 (68-72-69-73=282)	2 strokes	(United States) John Kernohan
3	May 30, 2002	Knoxville Open	−16 (71-69-64-68=272)	1 stroke	(Australia) Aaron Baddeley, (United States) Steve Ford
4	May 14, 2006	Rheem Classic	−13 (66-66-64-71=272)	Playoff	(United States) Michael Putnam
5	Aug 26, 2012	News Sentinel Open (2)	−18 (67-66-66-67=266)	1 stroke	(United States) D. J. Brigman, (United States) Nicholas Thompson, (Australia) Scott Gardiner

Web.com Tour playoff record (1–0)

No.	Year	Tournament	Opponent	Result
1	2006	Rheem Classic	(United States) Michael Putnam	Won with par on first extra hole

=== NGA Hooters Tour wins (1) ===
No.	Date	Tournament	Winning score	Margin of victory	Runners-up
1	Apr 12, 1998	Ronald Macdonald House Classic	−8 (68-69-69-70=276)	3 strokes	(United States) Shane Bertsch, (United States) Jason Caron, (United States) John Kimbell, (United States) Scott Medlin, (United States) Mike Swartz, (United States) Zoran Zorkic

== Results in major championships ==
Tournament	2003	2004	2005	2006	2007	2008	2009	2010	2011	2012
U.S. Open	T48				CUT		CUT			T59

Did not play

CUT = missed the half-way cut
"T" = tied
Note: Stiles only played in the U.S. Open.

== See also ==
- 2002 Buy.com Tour graduates
- 2004 Nationwide Tour graduates
- 2006 PGA Tour Qualifying School graduates
- 2008 Nationwide Tour graduates
- 2012 Web.com Tour graduates
- 2015 Web.com Tour Finals graduates
- List of golfers with most Web.com Tour wins
