= Cliff Kresge =

American professional golfer (born 1968)

Personal information
- Full name: Clifford Terry Kresge
- Nationality: United States
- Born: October 3, 1968 (age 58) Lakewood Township, New Jersey, U.S.
- Height: 6 ft 0 in (1.83 m)
- Weight: 195 lb (88 kg; 13.9 st)

Career
- Sport: Golf
- College: University of Central Florida
- Turned professional: 1991
- Current tour: Web.com Tour
- Former tour: PGA Tour
- Professional wins: 4

Number of wins by tour
- Korn Ferry Tour: 3
- Other: 1

Best results in major championships
- Masters Tournament: DNP
- PGA Championship: CUT: 2008
- U.S. Open: T10: 2003
- The Open Championship: CUT: 2003

Clifford Terry Kresge (born October 3, 1968) is an American professional golfer. He has played on the PGA Tour and Web.com Tour since 1997.

== Early life ==
Kresge was born in Lakewood Township, New Jersey. His parents moved to central Florida in 1972 and lived on the Dubsdread Golf Course in Orlando where he took golf at age 8. Kresge graduated from the University of Central Florida with a liberal arts degree in 1991.

== Professional career ==
Kresge turned professional in 1991. He played mainly on mini-tours until 1997 when he joined the Nationwide Tour. Kresge has three wins on the Nationwide Tour.

His best finishes on the PGA Tour are a pair of T-3 at the 2002 B.C. Open and the 2008 Arnold Palmer Invitational. He also finished tied for 10th in the 2003 U.S. Open.

Kresge won a 2011 NGA Hooters Tour event; the Bridgestone Winter Series at Deer Island GC in a four-hole playoff.

== Personal life ==
Kresge currently resides with his wife Judy in Kingsport, Tennessee. Judy has three sons from previous marriage while Cliff has a son of his own also from a previous marriage. Judy's oldest son Peter often caddies for Kresge.

Kresge has gone public, along with Ernie Els, about both of their sons being diagnosed with autism. Kresge was the Honorary Walk Chair for the November 15, 2008 Orlando Walk Now For Autism, a fundraiser for Autism Speaks. In September 2009, Kresge along with Els and 18 other PGA Tour players held a charity Pro-Am at Ridgefields Country Club in Kingsport for his Autism Charity: Kresge's Krew Foundation. The foundation again held their annual tournament at Ridgefields in 2010 and 2011. Ernie Els returned to headline a field of 15 PGA Tour players

== Professional wins (4) ==
=== Nationwide Tour wins (3) ===
No.	Date	Tournament	Winning score	Margin of victory	Runner(s)-up
1	May 5, 2002	Virginia Beach Open	−11 (68-71-67-71=277)	Playoff	(United States) Arron Oberholser
2	Jul 7, 2002	Hershey Open	−8 (67-71-71-67=276)	Playoff	(United States) Brian Claar, (United States) Steve Ford, (United States) Joel Kribel
3	Sep 24, 2006	Oregon Classic	−17 (70-67-67-67=271)	Playoff	(United States) Ricky Barnes

Nationwide Tour playoff record (3–0)

No.	Year	Tournament	Opponent(s)	Result
1	2002	Virginia Beach Open	(United States) Arron Oberholser	Won with eagle on second extra hole
2	2002	Hershey Open	(United States) Brian Claar, (United States) Steve Ford, (United States) Joel Kribel	Won with birdie on third extra hole
3	2006	Oregon Classic	(United States) Ricky Barnes	Won with par on third extra hole

=== Other wins (1) ===
- 2011 Bridgestone Winter Series at Deer Island GC (NGA Hooters Tour)

== Results in major championships ==
Tournament	2003	2004	2005	2006	2007	2008	2009
Masters Tournament							
U.S. Open	T10	T62					
The Open Championship	CUT						
PGA Championship						CUT	

Tournament	2010	2011	2012	2013
Masters Tournament				
U.S. Open				CUT
The Open Championship				
PGA Championship				

Top 10
Did not play

CUT = missed the half way cut
"T" indicates a tie for a place.

== See also ==
- 2000 PGA Tour Qualifying School graduates
- 2002 Buy.com Tour graduates
