= Patrick Moore (golfer) =

American professional golfer (born 1970)

Personal information
- Full name: Patrick Joseph Moore
- Nationality: United States
- Born: April 28, 1970 (age 56) Austin, Minnesota, U.S.
- Height: 5 ft 11 in (1.80 m)
- Weight: 160 lb (73 kg; 11 st)

Career
- Sport: Golf
- College: University of North Carolina
- Turned professional: 1993
- Former tours: PGA Tour; Nationwide Tour; Canadian Tour
- Professional wins: 4

Number of wins by tour
- Korn Ferry Tour: 3
- Other: 1

Achievements and awards
- Buy.com Tour money list winner: 2002
- Buy.com Tour Player of the Year: 2002

Patrick Joseph Moore (born April 28, 1970) is an American professional golfer.

== Career ==
Moore was born in Austin, Minnesota. He was a member of the PGA Tour. He has struggled with injuries for most of his career. He won three Buy.com Tour events in 2002 which gave him an immediate promotion to the PGA Tour.

Moore has struggled with back injuries since 2003 and has played in very few tournaments since 2004, although he maintained a PGA Tour card through a medical extension through the 2014 season.

== Professional wins (4) ==
=== Buy.com Tour wins (3) ===
Legend
Tour Championships (1)
Other Buy.com Tour (2)

No.	Date	Tournament	Winning score	Margin of victory	Runner(s)-up
1	May 12, 2002	Greater Richmond Open	−20 (66-64-67-71=268)	1 stroke	(United States) John Maginnes
2	Jun 23, 2002	Lake Erie Charity Classic	−9 (71-68-68-68=275)	1 stroke	(United States) Hunter Haas
3	Oct 27, 2002	Buy.com Tour Championship	−10 (71-69-66=206) (Note: Shortened to 54 holes due to weather.)	2 strokes	(New Zealand) Steven Alker, (United States) Mike Heinen, (United States) Jeff Klauk

=== Other wins (1) ===
- 1995 Waterloo Open Golf Classic

== See also ==
- 2002 Buy.com Tour graduates
