= 2002 Buy.com Tour =

Golf tour season

2002 Buy.com Tour season
- Duration: March 7, 2002 – October 27, 2002
- Number of official events: 28
- Most wins: (United States) Patrick Moore (3)
- Money list: (United States) Patrick Moore
- Player of the Year: (United States) Patrick Moore

The 2002 Buy.com Tour was the 13th season of the Buy.com Tour, the official development tour to the PGA Tour.

== Schedule ==
The following table lists official events during the 2002 season.

Date	Tournament	Location	Purse (US$)	Winner (Note: The number in parentheses after each winner's name is the number of Buy.com Tour events they had won up to and including that tournament. This information is only shown for Buy.com Tour members. It is rare for someone to accumulate many wins on the Buy.com Tour as success at this level usually leads to promotion to the PGA Tour.)	OWGR points	Other tours (Note: ANZ − PGA Tour of Australasia.)	Notes
Mar 10	Jacob's Creek Open Championship	Australia	500,000	(Australia) Gavin Coles (1)	12	ANZ	New to Buy.com Tour
Mar 17	Holden Clearwater Classic	New Zealand	500,000	(Australia) Peter O'Malley (n/a)	12	ANZ	New to Buy.com Tour
Apr 14	Louisiana Open	Louisiana	450,000	(New Zealand) Steven Alker (1)	6		
Apr 21	Arkansas Classic	Arkansas	450,000	(United States) Jace Bugg (1)	6		
Apr 28	BMW Charity Pro-Am	South Carolina	525,000	(United States) Charles Warren (1)	6		Pro-Am
May 5	Virginia Beach Open	Virginia	425,000	(United States) Cliff Kresge (1)	6		
May 12	Greater Richmond Open	Virginia	425,000	(United States) Patrick Moore (1)	6		
May 19	SAS Carolina Classic	North Carolina	450,000	(United States) Zoran Zorkic (1)	6		
Jun 2	Northeast Pennsylvania Classic	Pennsylvania	450,000	(United States) Gary Hallberg (1)	6		
Jun 9	Samsung Canadian PGA Championship	Canada	450,000	(United States) Arron Oberholser (1)	6		
Jun 23	Lake Erie Charity Classic	New York	425,000	(United States) Patrick Moore (2)	6		New tournament
Jun 30	Knoxville Open	Tennessee	425,000	(United States) Darron Stiles (3)	6		
Jul 7	Hershey Open	Pennsylvania	425,000	(United States) Cliff Kresge (2)	6		
Jul 14	Dayton Open	Ohio	425,000	(United States) Jason Buha (1)	6		
Jul 21	Fort Smith Classic	Arkansas	425,000	(United States) Todd Fischer (1)	6		
Jul 28	Price Cutter Charity Championship	Missouri	475,000	(United States) Patrick Sheehan (1)	6		
Aug 4	Omaha Classic	Nebraska	500,000	(United States) Jay Delsing (2)	6		
Aug 11	LaSalle Bank Open	Illinois	450,000	(United States) Marco Dawson (1)	6		New tournament
Aug 18	Preferred Health Systems Wichita Open	Kansas	425,000	(United States) Tyler Williamson (1)	6		
Aug 25	Permian Basin Open	Texas	425,000	(United States) Tag Ridings (1)	6		
Sep 8	Utah Classic	Utah	425,000	(United States) Arron Oberholser (2)	6		
Sep 15	Oregon Classic	Oregon	425,000	(United States) Jason Gore (2)	6		
Sep 22	Albertsons Boise Open	Idaho	575,000	(United States) Jason Gore (3)	6		
Sep 29	State Farm Open	California	450,000	(United States) Andy Miller (1)	6		
Oct 6	Bank of America Monterey Peninsula Classic	California	450,000	(United States) Roland Thatcher (1)	6		
Oct 13	Gila River Classic	Arizona	425,000	(United States) David Branshaw (1)	6		
Oct 20	Hibernia Southern Open	Louisiana	425,000	(Canada) David Morland IV (1)	6		
Oct 27	Buy.com Tour Championship	Alabama	600,000	(United States) Patrick Moore (3)	6		Tour Championship

== Money list ==
The money list was based on prize money won during the season, calculated in U.S. dollars. The top 15 players on the money list earned status to play on the 2003 PGA Tour.

Position	Player	Prize money ($)
1	(United States) Patrick Moore	381,965
2	(United States) Arron Oberholser	319,883
3	(United States) Doug Barron	248,175
4	(New Zealand) Steven Alker	247,008
5	(United States) Cliff Kresge	245,265

== Awards ==
Award	Winner	Ref.
Player of the Year (Jack Nicklaus Trophy)	(United States) Patrick Moore	
