= Ian Leggatt =

Canadian professional golfer (born 1965)

Personal information
- Full name: Ian Donald Leggatt
- Nationality: Canada
- Born: September 23, 1965 (age 61) Galt, Ontario, Canada
- Height: 6 ft 0 in (1.83 m)
- Weight: 170 lb (77 kg; 12 st)
- Children: 3

Career
- Sport: Golf
- College: Texas Wesleyan University
- Turned professional: 1990
- Former tours: PGA Tour; Nationwide Tour
- Professional wins: 2

Number of wins by tour
- PGA Tour: 1
- Korn Ferry Tour: 1

Best results in major championships
- Masters Tournament: DNP
- PGA Championship: CUT: 2002
- U.S. Open: T20: 2003
- The Open Championship: DNP

Ian Donald Leggatt (born Eion Donald Leggatt; September 23, 1965) is a Canadian professional golfer.

== Early life ==
Leggatt was born in Galt, now part of Cambridge, Ontario.

== Professional career ==
Leggatt has won one PGA Tour event and one Nationwide Tour event. He retired from professional golf in May 2009 due to injuries.

Leggatt now works for Wasserman Media Group as an agent/consultant in their golf management division. He appears on Sportsnet as their golf analyst.

== Professional wins (2) ==
=== PGA Tour wins (1) ===
No.	Date	Tournament	Winning score	Margin of victory	Runners-up
1	Feb 24, 2002	Touchstone Energy Tucson Open	−20 (68-71-65-64=268)	2 strokes	(United States) David Peoples, (United States) Loren Roberts

=== Buy.com Tour wins (1) ===
No.	Date	Tournament	Winning score	Margin of victory	Runner-up
1	Jun 11, 2000	Buy.com Dayton Open	−12 (69-69-68-70=276)	Playoff	(United States) Chris Smith

Buy.com Tour playoff record (1–0)

No.	Year	Tournament	Opponent	Result
1	2000	Buy.com Dayton Open	(United States) Chris Smith	Won with birdie on first extra hole

== Results in major championships ==
Tournament	2002	2003	2004	2005	2006	2007	2008
U.S. Open	T54	T20		CUT			T74
PGA Championship	CUT						

Did not play

CUT = missed the half-way cut
"T" indicates a tie for a place
Note: Leggatt never played in the Masters Tournament or The Open Championship.

== Team appearances ==
- World Cup (representing Canada): 1998, 2001, 2002

== See also ==
- 2000 Buy.com Tour graduates
- 2001 PGA Tour Qualifying School graduates
- 2005 PGA Tour Qualifying School graduates
