= Tag Ridings =

American professional golfer (born 1974)

Personal information
- Full name: Taggart Twain Ridings
- Nationality: United States
- Born: September 7, 1974 (age 52) Oklahoma City, Oklahoma, U.S.
- Height: 6 ft 1 in (1.85 m)
- Weight: 185 lb (84 kg; 13.2 st)

Career
- Sport: Golf
- College: University of Arkansas
- Turned professional: 1997
- Current tour: Korn Ferry Tour
- Former tour: PGA Tour
- Professional wins: 2

Number of wins by tour
- Korn Ferry Tour: 2

Best results in major championships
- Masters Tournament: DNP
- PGA Championship: DNP
- U.S. Open: CUT: 2000, 2006
- The Open Championship: DNP

Taggart Twain Ridings (born September 7, 1974) is an American professional golfer who has played on the PGA Tour and the Korn Ferry Tour.

== Early life and amateur career ==
Ridings was born in Oklahoma City, Oklahoma. His father, an Oklahoma club professional, started him in golf.

Ridings played at the University of Arkansas, graduating in 1997 with a degree in marketing.

== Professional career ==
In 1997, Ridings turned professional. Ridings has played the Korn Ferry Tour and PGA Tour since 2002, earning over three million dollars on the PGA Tour. Although he has never won a PGA Tour event, he finished tied for second at the 2004 Michelin Championship at Las Vegas. During the 2005 PGA Tour season he had his best year – finishing 91st on the money list and earning nearly $900,000.

In July 2021, Ridings captured his first victory in nearly 19 years at the TPC Colorado Championship. He defeated David Skinns and Kevin Yu in a playoff.

== Professional wins (2) ==
=== Korn Ferry Tour wins (2) ===
No.	Date	Tournament	Winning score	Margin of victory	Runner(s)-up
1	Aug 25, 2002	Permian Basin Open	−16 (69-67-67-69=272)	Playoff	(Australia) Mark Hensby
2	Jul 11, 2021	TPC Colorado Championship	−16 (70-68-66-68=272)	Playoff	(England) David Skinns, (Taiwan) Kevin Yu

Korn Ferry Tour playoff record (2–0)

No.	Year	Tournament	Opponent(s)	Result
1	2002	Permian Basin Open	(Australia) Mark Hensby	Won with eagle on first extra hole
2	2021	TPC Colorado Championship	(England) David Skinns, (Taiwan) Kevin Yu	Won with par on second extra hole Yu eliminated by birdie on first hole

== Results in major championships ==
Tournament	2000	2001	2002	2003	2004	2005	2006
U.S. Open	CUT						CUT

Did not play

CUT = missed the half-way cut
Note: Ridings only played in the U.S. Open.

== See also ==
- 2002 Buy.com Tour graduates
- 2007 PGA Tour Qualifying School graduates
- 2010 Nationwide Tour graduates
- 2012 PGA Tour Qualifying School graduates
- 2016 Web.com Tour Finals graduates
