= Marco Dawson =

American professional golfer

Personal information
- Nationality: United States
- Born: November 17, 1963 (age 62) Freising, Germany
- Height: 6 ft 0 in (1.83 m)
- Weight: 190 lb (86 kg; 14 st)
- Spouse: Heather (divorced)
- Children: 2

Career
- Sport: Golf
- College: Florida Southern College
- Turned professional: 1985
- Current tour: PGA Tour Champions
- Former tours: PGA Tour; Web.com Tour; Golden Bear Tour
- Professional wins: 5

Number of wins by tour
- Korn Ferry Tour: 1
- PGA Tour Champions: 2
- European Senior Tour: 1
- Other: 2

Best results in major championships
- Masters Tournament: DNP
- PGA Championship: 75th: 1996
- U.S. Open: T48: 2003
- The Open Championship: T68: 2016

Marco Dawson (born November 17, 1963) is an American professional golfer who now plays on the PGA Tour Champions, having previously played on the PGA Tour. He won the 2015 Senior Open Championship.

Dawson was born on a United States military base in Freising, Germany. He attended Florida Southern College, graduating in 1985, when turned professional. Dawson has enjoyed a long career playing both the PGA and Web.com Tours. He played on the PGA Tour in 1991–1997, 2000–2001, 2003–2008 and 2012 and played on the Web.com Tour in 1990, 1999, 2002, 2009–11, and 2013.

Dawson has won once on the Web.com Tour, a three stroke victory at the 2002 LaSalle Bank Open. His best finish on the PGA Tour is 2nd at the 1995 Greater Milwaukee Open, when he finished three strokes behind Scott Hoch.

He secured a return to the PGA Tour for 2012 via qualifying school in December 2011.

Dawson lives in Suntree, Florida.

== Playing partner disqualifications ==
In 2003, Dawson became involved in two separate incidents involving rules breaches. At the Chrysler Classic of Tucson in March, he was playing with Brandel Chamblee when Chamblee took an incorrect drop. Dawson was criticized for only notifying rules officials shortly after he had signed Chamblee's card, meaning disqualification rather than a two-stroke penalty. In a similar incident in October, Dawson was playing with Esteban Toledo when he called Toledo on an incorrect drop, resulting in Toledo's disqualification. The latter incident resulted in a feud in which Toledo sacked the agent both players shared, and Dawson was eventually fined $10,000 for not informing officials of an infringement promptly.

== Professional wins (5) ==
=== Buy.com Tour wins (1) ===
No.	Date	Tournament	Winning score	To par	Margin of victory	Runner-up
1	Aug 11, 2002	LaSalle Bank Open	71-69-67-69=276	−12	3 strokes	(United States) Darron Stiles

Buy.com Tour playoff record (0–1)

No.	Year	Tournament	Opponent	Result
1	1999	Nike Tour Championship	(United States) Bob Heintz	Lost to birdie on first extra hole

=== Golden Bear Tour wins (2) ===
No.	Date	Tournament	Winning score	To par	Margin of victory	Runner-up
1	Jun 18, 1998	Hammock Creek and Piper's Landing	69-65-67=201	−15	1 stroke	(United States) Brett Boner
2	Jul 31, 1998	Bear Lakes and Loxahatchee	69-67-69=205	−11	Playoff	(United States) Tim Petrovic

=== Champions Tour wins (2) ===
Legend
Senior major championships (1)
Other Champions Tour (1)

No.	Date	Tournament	Winning score	To par	Margin of victory	Runner-up
1	Mar 22, 2015	Tucson Conquistadores Classic	67-67-69=203	−13	2 strokes	(United States) Bart Bryant
2	Jul 26, 2015	The Senior Open Championship	65-67-68-64=264	−16	1 stroke	(Germany) Bernhard Langer

== Results in major championships ==
Tournament	1996	1997	1998	1999	2000	2001	2002	2003	2004	2005	2006	2007	2008	2009
U.S. Open		83						T48						
The Open Championship														
PGA Championship	75													

Tournament	2010	2011	2012	2013	2014	2015	2016
U.S. Open							
The Open Championship							T68
PGA Championship							

Note: Dawson never played in the Masters Tournament.

Did not play

CUT = missed the half-way cut
"T" indicates a tie for a place

== Senior major championships ==
=== Wins (1) ===
Year	Championship	54 holes	Winning score	Margin	Runner-up
2015	The Senior Open Championship	Tied for lead	−16 (65-67-68-64=264)	1 stroke	(Germany) Bernhard Langer

=== Results timeline ===
Results not in chronological order before 2022.

Tournament	2014	2015	2016	2017	2018	2019	2020	2021	2022	2023	2024
The Tradition	T9	T38	T23	T4	T46	T30	NT	T46	T13	T5	T18
Senior PGA Championship	T9	T9	CUT	T33	T19	T35	NT	T63	CUT	T8	T32
U.S. Senior Open	T5	T33	T32	T23	T12	T47	NT	20		T57	CUT
Senior Players Championship	T15	T7	T69	T54	T24	T30	T28	T42	10	T27	T44
The Senior Open Championship	T39	1	T60	T45	T6		NT		T36		

Win
Top 10
Did not play

CUT = missed the halfway cut
"T" indicates a tie for a place
NT = no tournament due to COVID-19 pandemic

== See also ==
- 1990 PGA Tour Qualifying School graduates
- 1991 PGA Tour Qualifying School graduates
- 1994 PGA Tour Qualifying School graduates
- 1999 Nike Tour graduates
- 2002 Buy.com Tour graduates
- 2005 PGA Tour Qualifying School graduates
- 2006 PGA Tour Qualifying School graduates
- 2011 PGA Tour Qualifying School graduates
