= Antigua Apparel =

Golf apparel business

- Founded: 1976
- Founder: Tom Dooley
- Headquarters: Peoria, Arizona, United States
- Products: lifestyle apparel, sportswear headwear & accessories
- Website: www.antigua.com

Antigua Group, Inc. is an American company based in the Phoenix, Arizona market that specializes in the designing and marketing of men’s and women’s "lifestyle" apparel and sportswear, most notably in the golf industry. In addition to golf, the company also serves the licensed sports, corporate, and specialty retail markets.

== History ==
The genesis of what would later become Antigua was founded by Tom Dooley, a Phoenix area veteran of the golf industry, in 1976 at a private residence (Dooley’s garage) in Scottsdale, Arizona. A short time later, the first office/warehouse was leased and the company did business under the name Eagle Golf of Scottsdale. It was at this time that the first embroidery machine was purchased and the first sales representative hired to keep up with demand. After a vacation in the late seventies to the British West Indies island of Antigua, Dooley renamed the company in 1979.

In a 1996 interview, Dooley, who prior to launching Antigua was a sales rep for another golf product line, cited his dissatisfaction with his former company’s delivery system as the reason to start his own company. "If I didn't deliver, I wanted it to be my fault, not someone else's," he said. "It's hard to build a customer base when you can't deliver on time, so it was very important to me to control the ability of the company to deliver or not deliver. It's very important to me to be very honest with a customer if we are unable to deliver ... 99 percent of the customers always will come back if you're honest with them.”

For the first two decades of Antigua, the company continued to grow and moved in and out of several facilities at this time. In 1982, Antigua moved into a 13,555-square-foot (1,259.3 m^{2}) facility also located in Scottsdale and rebranded as Antigua Sportswear, as to more closely identify with the product. In 1992, the company once again changed its name to The Antigua Group and by 1998, it now occupied 90,000 square feet (8,400 m^{2}). In October 2001, Antigua relocated to a new 110,000-square-foot (10,000 m^{2}) facility in Peoria, Arizona where all divisions are housed under one roof.

In 1997 Antigua became a wholly owned subsidiary of Antigua Enterprises, Inc. and in April 2003, the controlling interest of Antigua was sold to Ashley NA, LLC, a subsidiary of Sports Direct International. of the United Kingdom. It was at this time that Ron McPherson, first employee of the company and recipient of the PGA of America’s Ernie Sabayrac Award for contributions to the golf industry, was named President.

== Markets ==
Antigua began in business serving the golf industry. Antigua has displayed its line at 32 consecutive PGA Merchandise Shows and has been chosen as a vendor partner for Ryder Cup Matches, PGA Championships, Solheim Cups and numerous events on all tours.

In the late 1980s and early 1990s, Antigua entered into the major licensed sports markets, starting with the NCAA. Antigua currently produces official merchandise for the NFL, NBA, NHL and Major League Baseball, Minor League Baseball, colleges and universities, available for sale at department stores, sporting goods outlets, sports specialty stores, team shops and concessionaires. Antigua also serves the corporate casual apparel market, the specialty retail market and most recently entered the tennis market with products for men and women. Since then, the company is now represented throughout the United States and other parts of the world in the major markets including golf, licensed, corporate and general retail.

== Technology ==
In many Antigua products a technology known as Desert Dry fabric is utilized. Desert Dry is a moisture wicking technology created to absorb and wick moisture.,

== Players ==
Antigua has been outfitting many golfers on the PGA Tour, Korn Ferry Tour, LPGA and Symetra Tour, as well as the U.S. Ryder Cup team and U.S. Solheim Cup teams. The following is a list of players that either currently or formerly have worn Antigua apparel on tour.

=== Men ===
- (United States) Notah Begay III
- (United States) Craig Bowden
- (United States) D. J. Brigman
- (United States) Mark Brooks
- (United States) Jim Carter
- (United States) Billy Casper
- (Northern Ireland) Darren Clarke
- (Australia) Bruce Crampton
- (United States) Jim Furyk
- (United States) Troy Kelly
- (United States) Bob May
- (United States) Billy Mayfair
- (United States) Andrew McGee
- (United States) Patrick Moore
- (United States) Bob Murphy
- (South Korea) Jin Park
- (United States) Scott Sterling
- (United States) Payne Stewart
- (United States) Kevin Streelman
- (United States) Steve Stricker
- (Australia) Richard Swift
- (United States) Jerod Turner
- (New Zealand) Grant Waite
- (United States) Brian Stuard
- (United States) Jason Allred
- (United States) Kris Blanks
- (United States) Justin Bolli
- (England) Lee Westwood
- (England) Gary Christian

=== Women ===
- (United States) Stacy Lewis
- (United States) Gerina Piller
- (United States) Lizette Salas
- (United States) Stacy Prammanasudh Upton
- (United States) Wendy Ward
- (United States) Brittany Lang
- (United States) Alison Walshe
- (Italy) Giulia Molinaro
- (Canada) Alena Sharp
- (United States) Pat Bradley
- (United States) Dorothy Delasin
- (Sweden) Liselotte Neumann
- (Sweden) Annika Sörenstam
- (United States) Allison Hanna Williams
- (United States) Brittany Lincicome
- (United States) Kris Tamulis
- (United States) Austin Ernst
- (United States) Kim Kaufman
