= Kent Eger =

Canadian professional golfer

Personal information
- Full name: Kent Eger
- Nationality: Canada
- Born: 18 February 1981 (age 45) Regina, Saskatchewan, Canada
- Height: 6 ft 3 in (1.91 m)
- Weight: 190 lb (86 kg; 14 st)

Career
- Sport: Golf
- Turned professional: 2006
- Former tours: Canadian Tour; Gateway Tour
- Professional wins: 7

Best results in major championships
- Masters Tournament: DNP
- PGA Championship: DNP
- U.S. Open: CUT: 2010
- The Open Championship: DNP

Kent Eger (born February 18, 1981) is a Canadian professional golfer who plays on the Canadian Tour and Gateway Tour. Eger was born in Regina, Saskatchewan, Canada and currently resides in Scottsdale, Arizona.

== Junior and amateur golf ==
Eger had success as a junior golfer in Saskatchewan, winning the 1999 Saskatchewan Junior Boys Championship, before moving to British Columbia to further his golf career. Eger played out of the Radium Resort in Radium Hot Springs, British Columbia, where he represented British Columbia on two Willingdon Cup teams, and played in four Canadian Amateur Championships.

== Professional career ==
=== Gateway Tour ===
Eger turned professional in 2006, and began playing competitively on the Gateway Tour in Phoenix, Arizona. He has played there for four seasons, and has won five tournaments.

=== Canadian Tour ===
In 2008, Eger joined the Canadian Tour on a full-time basis, and was named Canadian Rookie of the Year. Eger's debut season included a win at the 2008 Seaforth Country Classic, where his score of 26-under-par was one shot shy of the Canadian Tour's all-time scoring record held by Tim Clark, but did set an overall Canadian Tour low record 72-hole score of 258. Two years later, Eger won his second Canadian Tour tournament at the same event, the 2010 Seaforth Country Classic.

=== Other achievements ===
In 2008, Eger successfully made it through the first two stages of the PGA Tour Qualifying School and reached the final stage, where he obtained conditional status on the 2009 Nationwide Tour. Being low on the priority list, he only played in two Nationwide Tour events in 2009, missing the cut at both the Wayne Gretzky Classic and the Mexican PGA Championship.

Eger was one of 11 contestants on Big Break Indian Wells, which began screening in hour-long weekly installments on the Golf Channel on May 16, 2011. The winner gained an exemption into the PGA Tour's 2012 Zurich Classic of New Orleans, along with an array of monetary prizes and endorsements, totaling over $50,000. Eger lost in the finale of the competition to fellow countryman David Byrne.

== Professional wins (7) ==
=== Canadian Tour wins (2) ===
No.	Date	Tournament	Winning score	To par	Margin of victory	Runner(s)-up
1	Aug 31, 2008	Seaforth Country Classic	65-64-65-64=258	−26	2 strokes	(United States) Wil Collins, (United States) John Ellis, (United States) Daniel Im
2	Aug 22, 2010	Economical Insurance Group Seaforth Country Classic (2)	67-64-68-65=264	−20	2 strokes	(New Zealand) Josh Geary

=== Gateway Tour wins (5) ===
No.	Date	Tournament	Winning score	To par	Margin of victory	Runner(s)-up
1	Sep 7, 2006	Desert Summer 12	64-67-64=195	−16	1 stroke	(United States) Aaron Watkins
2	Mar 22, 2007	Desert Spring 1	205	−11	6 strokes	(United States) Brian Vranesh
3	Sep 7, 2007	Desert Summer 12	65-67-68-69=269	−18	1 stroke	(United States) Brian Kontak, (United States) Andy Walker
4	Apr 25, 2008	Desert Spring 5	66-66-68=200	−13	1 stroke	(Canada) Richard T. Lee
5	Oct 8, 2010	Q School Challenge 4	69-69-72=210	−6	2 strokes	(Canada) Richard T. Lee
