= Leif Olsson =

Leif Olsson may refer to:

- Leif "Loket" Olsson (1942–2025), Swedish television presenter, sports journalist, radio host, and dansband singer
- Leif Olsson (footballer) (born 1968), Swedish football midfielder

== See also ==
- Leif Olson (born 1981), American golfer
- Leif Olsen (1927–2012), Norwegian football striker
