= Justin Hicks (golfer) =

American professional golfer (born 1974)

Personal information
- Nationality: United States
- Born: October 28, 1974 (age 52) Wyandotte, Michigan, U.S.
- Height: 6 ft 3 in (1.91 m)
- Weight: 200 lb (91 kg; 14 st)

Career
- Sport: Golf
- College: University of Michigan
- Turned professional: 1997
- Former tours: PGA Tour; Web.com Tour; Golden Bear Tour; Gateway Tour; Tarheel Tour; Minor League Golf Tour
- Professional wins: 25

Number of wins by tour
- Korn Ferry Tour: 2
- Other: 23

Best results in major championships
- Masters Tournament: DNP
- PGA Championship: CUT: 2025
- U.S. Open: T60: 2011
- The Open Championship: T45: 2012

Achievements and awards
- Minor League Golf Tour money list winner: 2006, 2017

Justin Hicks (born October 28, 1974) is an American professional golfer.

== Career ==
Hicks was born in Wyandotte, Michigan. He graduated from the University of Michigan and currently plays on the Web.com Tour.

After one day at the 2008 U.S. Open, Hicks was tied for the lead after shooting a 68. He fell well down the leaderboard after the first round and ended in a tie for 74th.

Hicks finished 25th on the 2010 Nationwide Tour money list, the last automatic qualifying spot. As a PGA Tour rookie in 2011, Hicks finished in 60th place in the 2011 U.S. Open.

Hicks finished 11th on the 2012 Nationwide Tour money list, earning an automatic qualifying spot on the PGA Tour for the 2013 season. In his first event of 2013, Hicks finished T13 at the Sony Open in Hawaii.

After retiring from professional golf, Hicks became a golf teacher. He qualified from the 2025 PGA Championship and plays out of the South Florida section.

== Professional wins (25) ==
=== Nationwide Tour wins (2) ===
No.	Date	Tournament	Winning score	Margin of victory	Runner(s)-up
1	Jun 29, 2008	Ford Wayne Gretzky Classic	−16 (70-63-67-69=269)	Playoff	(United States) Casey Wittenberg
2	May 16, 2010	BMW Charity Pro-Am	−20 (66-65-69-66=266)	2 strokes	(United States) Kevin Chappell, (United States) Tommy Gainey, (United States) Chris Kirk, (United States) Jamie Lovemark

Nationwide Tour playoff record (1–0)

No.	Year	Tournament	Opponent	Result
1	2008	Ford Wayne Gretzky Classic	(United States) Casey Wittenberg	Won with par on first extra hole

=== Golden Bear Tour wins (3) ===
No.	Date	Tournament	Winning score	Margin of victory	Runner(s)-up
1	Apr 14, 2004	Hammock Creek 1	−9 (66-71-70=207)	2 strokes	(United States) Ryan LaVoie
2	Apr 22, 2004	PGA National Estates 2	−9 (69-67-71=207)	2 strokes	(Brazil) Philippe Gasnier
3	Apr 15, 2005	North	−11 (65-71-69=205)	2 strokes	(United States) Mike Adamson, (United States) Nick Cook

=== Gateway Tour wins (4) ===
No.	Date	Tournament	Winning score	Margin of victory	Runner-up
1	Feb 15, 2006	Beach Spring A6	−9 (72-64-71=207)	1 stroke	(United States) Colby Beckstrom
2	Sep 15, 2006	Beach Summer 13	−17 (66-71-68-66=271)	1 stroke	(United States) Jack Lander
3	Jan 11, 2007	Beach Winter 2	−17 (64-69-66=199)	Playoff	(United States) Adam Fox
4	Jan 9, 2008	Beach Winter 1	−11 (67-71-67=205)	3 strokes	(United States) Kyle Dobbs

=== Tarheel Tour wins (2) ===
No.	Date	Tournament	Winning score	Margin of victory	Runner-up
1	Apr 21, 2005	Verdict Ridge Open	−11 (67-67-71=205)	1 stroke	(United States) Matt Johnson
2	May 11, 2007	Sapona Open	−14 (64-66-69=199)	3 strokes	(United States) Matt Cannon

=== Minor League Golf Tour wins (14) ===
No.	Date	Tournament	Winning score	Margin of victory	Runner(s)-up
1	Jan 31, 2006	January Invitational	−6 (65-73=138)	Playoff	(United States) Sam Spector
2	Apr 18, 2006	April Invitational	−2 (74-68=142)	Playoff	(United States) Jay Westerlund
3	Aug 29, 2006	August Little Buddy Major	−5 (68-71=139)	Shared title with (United States) Lloyd Warwick	
4	Dec 12, 2007	Tour Championship	−9 (70-69-68=207)	Playoff	(United States) Marvin King
5	Jan 27, 2009	Basic Golf 2-Day	−8 (67-69=136)	1 stroke	(United States) Sal Spallone
6	Sep 15, 2016	Web.com Q-School Contest #5	−18 (70-68-67-65=270)	Playoff	(United States) Lee McCoy
7	Apr 26, 2017	Major II	−12 (67-65=134)	1 stroke	(United States) Billy Kennerly
8	Jun 22, 2017	Atlantis Country Club 2-Day	−15 (64-65=129)	8 strokes	(United States) Kristian Caparros
9	Jul 11, 2017	PGA Champ 2-Day	−14 (67-63=130)	12 strokes	(United States) Tarik Can, (United States) Hunter O'Mahony
10	Aug 8, 2017	PGA Fazio 2-Day	−9 (68-67=135)	1 stroke	(Mexico) Óscar Fraustro
11	Aug 30, 2017	Breakers West Qualifying School Tune Up 2-Day	−10 (66-68=134)	5 strokes	(United States) Ryan Harris, (United States) Carl McCauley
12	Sep 13, 2018	Jupiter CC 2-Day	−10 (69-65=134)	1 stroke	(Venezuela) Nicolas Cavero, (United States) John Gerber
13	Jan 22, 2019	Qualifying School Contest #1	−6 (70-66=136)	2 strokes	(United States) David Kocher, (United States) Billy Walthouse
14	Jul 31, 2019	Monday Qualifier Contest #6	−15 (69-64-68=201)	1 stroke	(United States) Michael Kartrude

== Results in major championships ==
Tournament	2004	2005	2006	2007	2008	2009	2010	2011	2012	2013	2014	2015	2016	2017	2018
Masters Tournament															
U.S. Open	CUT				T74			T60	CUT	CUT			67		
The Open Championship									T45						
PGA Championship															

Tournament	2019	2020	2021	2022	2023	2024	2025
Masters Tournament							
PGA Championship							CUT
U.S. Open							CUT
The Open Championship		NT					

Did not play

CUT = missed the half-way cut
"T" = tied
NT = no tournament due to COVID-19 pandemic

== See also ==
- 2010 Nationwide Tour graduates
- 2010 PGA Tour Qualifying School graduates
- 2012 Web.com Tour graduates
