= Tommy Gainey =

American professional player (born 1975)

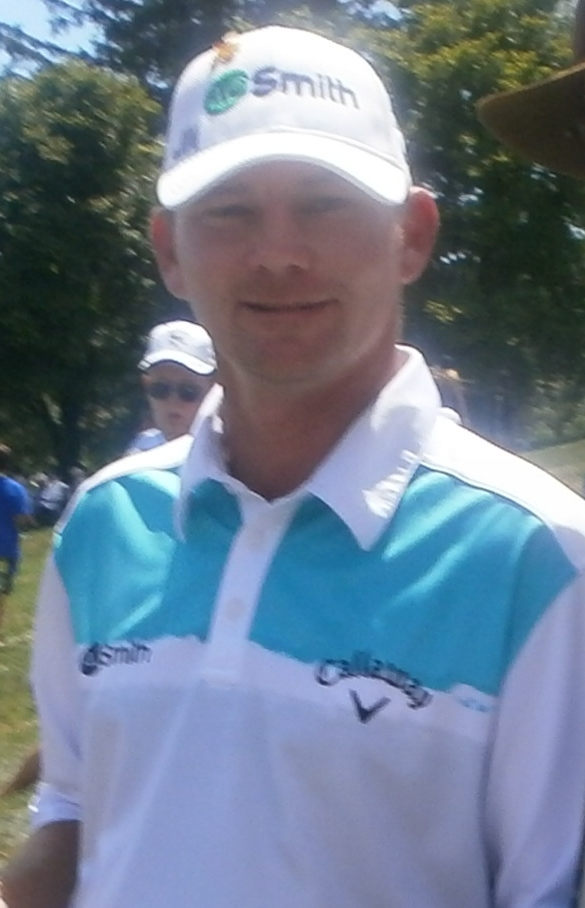
- Gainey in 2012

Personal information
- Full name: Thomas Dale Gainey Jr.
- Nickname: Two Gloves
- Nationality: United States
- Born: August 13, 1975 (age 51) Darlington, South Carolina, U.S.
- Height: 6 ft 0 in (1.83 m)
- Weight: 190 lb (86 kg; 14 st)

Career
- Sport: Golf
- College: Central Carolina Technical College
- Turned professional: 1997
- Current tours: PGA Tour Champions; PGA Tour (past champion status); Korn Ferry Tour
- Former tours: Gateway Tour; Tarheel Tour
- Professional wins: 14
- Highest ranking: 84 (August 21, 2011)

Number of wins by tour
- PGA Tour: 1
- Korn Ferry Tour: 3
- PGA Tour Champions: 1
- Other: 9

Best results in major championships
- Masters Tournament: DNP
- PGA Championship: T61: 2013
- U.S. Open: DNP
- The Open Championship: DNP

Achievements and awards
- PGA Tour Champions Rookie of the Year: 2025

Thomas Dale Gainey Jr. (born August 13, 1975), also known as "Two Gloves", is an American professional golfer on the PGA Tour as well as the PGA Tour Champions.

== Early life ==
Gainey was born in Darlington, South Carolina. He attended the Central Carolina Technical College, studying industrial maintenance, and graduated in 1999.

Before becoming a professional golfer, he worked on an assembly line in South Carolina, wrapping insulation around hot water heaters for A.O. Smith Corporation.

== Professional career ==
=== Minitours ===
In 1997, Gainey turned professional. For the next several years played golf on smaller tours in the southern United States. Gainey won four events on the Egolf Tarheel Tour, two in 2006 and one in 2007. He also won an event on the NGA Hooters Tour, and he played on the Gateway Tour.

In 2005, Gainey appeared on the Golf Channel's show The Big Break IV: USA vs. Europe, being eliminated in the sixth episode. He would return to the show in 2007 for The Big Break VII: Reunion at Reunion, which he won. In 2007, Gainey played four events on the Nationwide Tour and recorded one top-ten finish. At the end of the 2007 season, he earned a PGA Tour card through graduating from Q-School, finishing the six rounds T-19, after going through all three elimination stages of qualifying, a total of 14 rounds. That made him the first Big Break alumnus to earn a PGA Tour card.

=== PGA Tour ===
Gainey played on the PGA Tour for the first time in 2008, but struggled for most of the season. He made only five cuts in 23 events and was 228th on the money list, before entering the last event of the season, the Children's Miracle Network Classic at the Walt Disney World Resort. In the last round, playing the Magnolia Course, he shot a 64 and finished second to Davis Love III by one stroke. That finish moved Gainey inside the top 150 on the money list (to 148th, an 80-spot leap), which gave him conditional status for the 2009 season. Gainey re-entered the Q-School to try and gain back full playing privileges, but finished well down the leaderboard in T80th. He then split his time between both the PGA Tour and Nationwide Tour in 2009, struggling again on the PGA Tour, making just 8 out of 15 cuts, with one top-25 finish. He ended the year 202nd on the money list, not even earning conditional status for 2010.

Gainey returned to the Nationwide Tour in 2010, where he played the full season. He recorded some impressive results, claiming his first Nationwide Tour title at the Melwood Prince George's County Open in June. Gainey won the event by one stroke over Frank Lickliter and Jin Park, with weekend rounds of 64 and 65 securing victory. The following month, Gainey won his second Nationwide Tour title at the Chiquita Classic, winning by three strokes over Joe Affrunti. He shot a 10 under round of 62 in round three on the way to the win. He finished the season fourth on the Nationwide Tour money list and secured a return to the PGA Tour in 2011.

In 2011, Gainey missed the cut in his first three events, then made six consecutive cuts through to the end of March. At the 2011 Waste Management Phoenix Open in Scottsdale, Arizona, he was in contention late in the final round, but made a quadruple-bogey 8 on the par-4 17th hole to finish tied for 8th. He posted a fifth-place finish at the Honda Classic in Florida a month later. Gainey's best 2011 Tour finish came at The Heritage in Hilton Head, South Carolina, when he needed a 15-foot putt on the 72nd green to tie clubhouse leader Brandt Snedeker, but missed it, finishing the event in third place. The next week on tour, Gainey finished in a tie for third again at the Zurich Classic of New Orleans, where he finished two strokes outside of a playoff. In August, due to his good play for the year, Gainey qualified to play in his first major championship at the PGA Championship at the Atlanta Athletic Club. He shot rounds of 81 and 74 to miss the cut, but bounced back with a third-place finish the next week at the Wyndham Championship. The third occasion in 2011 that Gainey had finished in the top three in an event. The result moved him to a career high of 84th in the world rankings. Gainey ended his breakthrough year with another T3rd finish at the Justin Timberlake Shriners Hospitals for Children Open in the Fall Series. Gainey ended the year 35th on the money list. with 17 cuts and 7 top-10s in 34 events.

Gainey started the 2012 season slowly, making only three of his first ten cuts, having to withdraw twice due to injury. He did not record a top 10 finish until the end of May at the Crowne Plaza Invitational at Colonial where he finished third for the fifth time in his career on the PGA Tour. For the rest of the season, Gainey played more consistently, making nine of the next thirteen cuts, but without any significant results. Then on October 21, 2012, during the Fall Series, after 105 starts and 48 cuts made, Gainey won his first PGA Tour event at the McGladrey Classic. He came from seven strokes back of final round leaders Jim Furyk and Davis Love III to win by one from David Toms, after shooting a final round of 60. Gainey had a putt from about 20 feet on the 18th green for a 59 but it missed on the right hand side. His round on Sunday still stands as the tournament scoring record for a single round in that event.

In January 2020, Gainey won The Bahamas Great Exuma Classic on the Korn Ferry Tour, his first professional win since 2012. His winning score was 277 (11-under-par). He started the season with limited status on the PGA Tour as a past champion and on the Korn Ferry Tour after a T76 finish at Q School.

Between 2021 and 2023, Gainey split his time playing on the PGA Tour and Korn Ferry Tour, with his best finish in that span occurring at the Puerto Rico Open in March 2022 with a T3, where Ryan Brehm won in a landslide six-shot victory where he finished seven shots behind. In 2024, Gainey spent most of his competitive golf time on the Korn Ferry Tour and played fairly well. His best finish came in July of that year where he finished solo second at the Price Cutter Charity Championship Presented by Dr. Pepper at 22 under par for the week; three shots behind Matt McCarty. Heading into the Korn Ferry Tour Championship, he was 50th on the money list and had a slim chance to gain his PGA Tour card back by finishing inside the top 30, where he needed either a win or a solo second-place finish. Gainey was in a share of 16th place heading into the final round, but a final round 79 saw him finish in a share of 44th place and he finished the season 52nd on the money list. In the PGA Tour Q-School tournament that December, despite an opening round of 76, Gainey shot 67 and 68 on Friday and Saturday, respectively, and once again put himself within striking distance to gain his PGA Tour card back for the first time since 2014, needing a top five finish. His final round 1-under par 69 was good for a share of 19th place.

On July 11, 2025, after shooting a 2-under par 68 at Hurstbourne Country Club at the ISCO Championship, Gainey made his 100th cut all time on the PGA Tour. Due to his limited status as a past champion as well as turning 50 on August 13th where he would then move on to the PGA Tour Champions, the 2025 PGA Tour season only saw Gainey make four starts but he made three cuts and reached the 100 cuts mark with 33 days to spare until his 50th birthday.

Gainey wears black, wet-weather golf gloves, one on each hand, at all times when playing golf. He stated on October 21, 2012, that his father (who introduced him to the game) wears two gloves, and so he learned to play with them.

Gainey uses the very rare baseball grip on full shots, where he hooks his left (top) thumb behind his right hand (normal position for the left thumb for a right-handed golfer is under the right thumb). His swing is also notably jerky and eccentric, and has been described as "trying to kill a snake with a garden hose." His other 2011 sponsors included Under Armour, Adams Golf and The Dow Group. In 2012 Gainey made the switch to Callaway Clubs, and he continues to be sponsored by The Dow Group.

=== PGA Tour Champions ===
On October 5, 2025, Gainey, after being a Monday qualifier for the fourth time this season on PGA Tour Champions, holed an eagle putt on the 13th hole of Timquana Country Club to defeat Cameron Percy, finishing with a 66 (−6) for a two-shot victory in the Constellation Furyk and Friends at Timuquana Country Club in Florida.

== Personal life ==
In December 2019, Gainey was arrested in a major prostitution sting in Florida. Gainey was not given prison time, but was sentenced to eleven months probation, 100 hours community service, and fines of $6,218.60.

== Professional wins (14) ==
=== PGA Tour wins (1) ===
No.	Date	Tournament	Winning score	Margin of victory	Runner-up
1	Oct 21, 2012	McGladrey Classic	−16 (69-67-68-60=264)	1 stroke	(United States) David Toms

=== Korn Ferry Tour wins (3) ===
No.	Date	Tournament	Winning score	Margin of victory	Runner(s)-up
1	Jun 6, 2010	Melwood Prince George's County Open	−17 (69-69-64-65=267)	1 stroke	(United States) Frank Lickliter, (South Korea) Jin Park
2	Jul 18, 2010	Chiquita Classic	−27 (64-66-62-69=261)	3 strokes	(United States) Joe Affrunti
3	Jan 15, 2020	The Bahamas Great Exuma Classic	−11 (66-75-67-69=277)	4 strokes	(United States) John Oda, (United States) Dylan Wu

=== NGA Hooters Tour wins (1) ===
No.	Date	Tournament	Winning score	Margin of victory	Runner-up
1	Jun 10, 2007	Bentonville Open	−15 (71-64-65-69=269)	3 strokes	(Northern Ireland) Gareth Maybin

=== Gateway Tour wins (3) ===
No.	Date	Tournament	Winning score	Margin of victory	Runner(s)-up
1	Aug 13, 2004	Beach Series 10	−19 (70-67-64-68=269)	1 stroke	(United States) Dustin Bray
2	Aug 27, 2004	Beach Series 11	−24 (67-64-63-70=264)	2 strokes	(United States) Mac Butler, (United States) Kevin Gessino-Kraft
3	Apr 8, 2005	Hampton Cove	−5 (73-66-72=211)	1 stroke	(United States) Chip Deason

=== Tarheel Tour wins (4) ===
No.	Date	Tournament	Winning score	Margin of victory	Runner-up
1	Sep 29, 2004	Statesville Open	−12 (66-66=132)	3 strokes	(England) Gary Christian
2	Mar 2, 2006	Patriots Point Open	−9 (69-68-70=207)	Playoff	(United States) Andy Bare
3	Jun 2, 2006	River Run Classic	−20 (68-65-63=196)	2 strokes	(United States) John Mallinger
4	Mar 29, 2007	Oldfield Open	−13 (67-69-67=203)	2 strokes	(United States) Jonathan Fricke

=== Other wins (1) ===
No.	Date	Tournament	Winning score	Margin of victory	Runners-up
1	Nov 18, 2012	Callaway Pebble Beach Invitational	−11 (69-69-70-69=277)	1 stroke	(United States) William McGirt, (United States) Kirk Triplett

=== PGA Tour Champions wins (1) ===
No.	Date	Tournament	Winning score	Margin of victory	Runner-up
1	Oct 5, 2025	Constellation Furyk and Friends	−14 (69-67-66=202)	2 strokes	(Australia) Cameron Percy

== Results in major championships ==
Tournament	2011	2012	2013
Masters Tournament			
U.S. Open			
The Open Championship			
PGA Championship	CUT	CUT	T61

Did not play

CUT = missed the half-way cut
"T" = tied

== Results in The Players Championship ==
Tournament	2011	2012	2013
The Players Championship	CUT	CUT	CUT

CUT = missed the halfway cut

== Results in World Golf Championships ==
Tournament	2013
Match Play	
Championship	
Invitational	T65
Champions	

Did not play

"T" = Tied

== See also ==
- 2007 PGA Tour Qualifying School graduates
- 2010 Nationwide Tour graduates
