= Dallas Open =

Dallas Open may refer to:

== Golf ==
- Dallas Open Invitational, a golf tournament on the PGA Tour, now known as The Byron Nelson
- Dallas Civitan Open, a golf tournament on the LPGA Tour, later known as the Mary Kay Classic
- Greater Dallas Open, a defunct golf tournament on the Web.com Tour
- Dallas Open (1926), a professional golf event played only in 1926

== Tennis ==
- Dallas Open (2022), a current tennis tournament
- Dallas Open (1953–1983), a defunct tennis tournament
