= Kevin Streelman =

American professional golfer (born 1978)

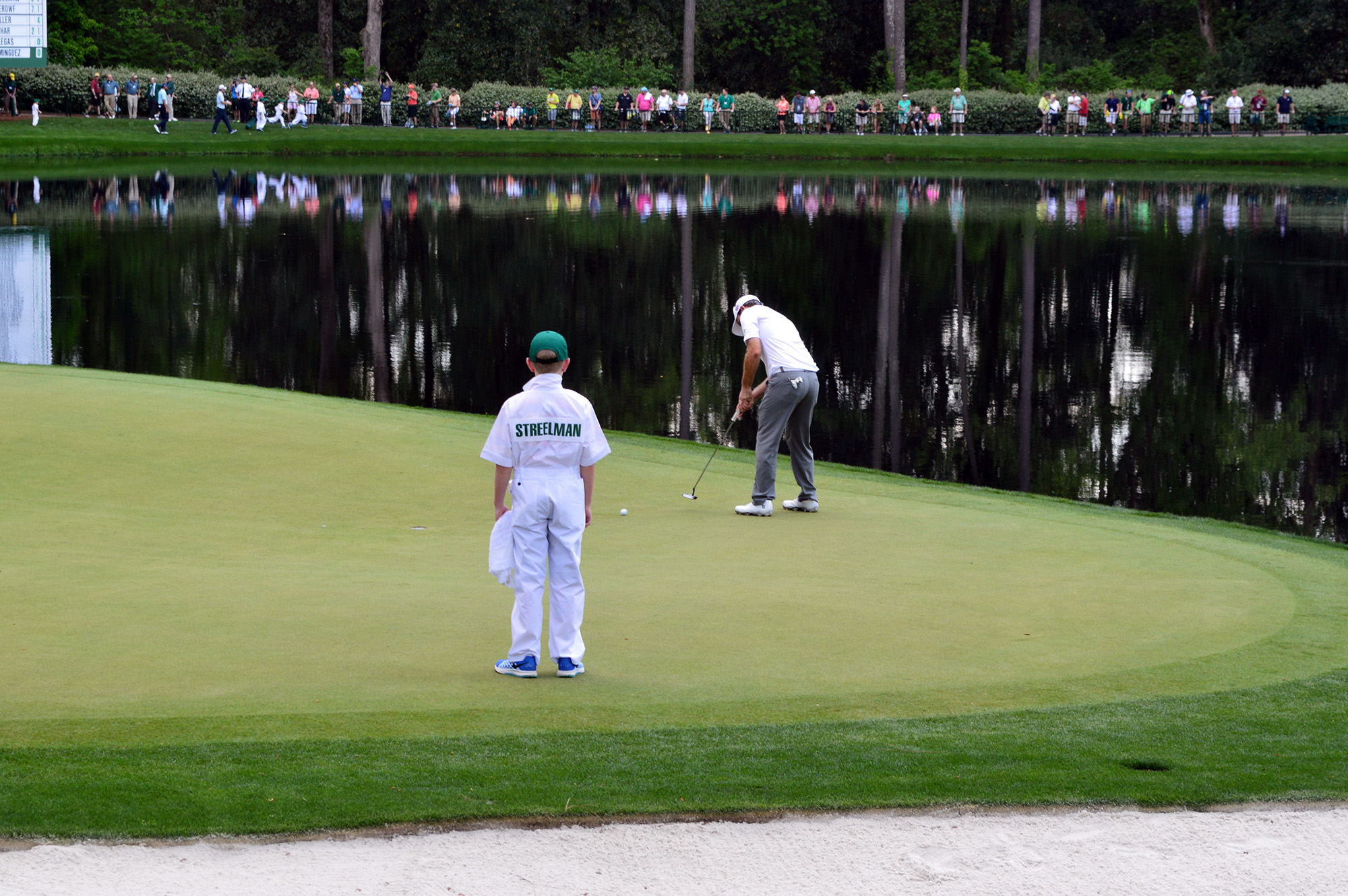

Personal information
- Full name: Kevin Garret Streelman
- Nationality: United States
- Born: November 4, 1978 (age 47) Winfield, Illinois, U.S.
- Height: 5 ft 10 in (1.78 m)
- Weight: 175 lb (79 kg; 12.5 st)
- Spouse: Courtney
- Children: 2

Career
- Sport: Golf
- College: Duke University
- Turned professional: 2001
- Current tour: PGA Tour
- Former tour: Gateway Tour
- Professional wins: 6
- Highest ranking: 36 (May 12, 2013)

Number of wins by tour
- PGA Tour: 2
- Other: 4

Best results in major championships
- Masters Tournament: T12: 2015
- PGA Championship: T8: 2021
- U.S. Open: T13: 2016
- The Open Championship: T19: 2021

Kevin Garret Streelman (born November 4, 1978) is an American professional golfer who plays on the PGA Tour.

== Early life and amateur career ==
In 1978, Streelman was born in Winfield, Illinois. Streelman, who caddied at famed three-time U.S. Open venue Chicago Golf Club while growing up, graduated from Wheaton Warrenville South High School in 1997.

After high school, Streelman attended Duke University. He graduated in 2001 and was a member of the Delta Sigma Phi fraternity. He co-captained the Duke team with Paul Tucker and Denver Brown. He played college golf at Duke with fellow PGA Tour member Leif Olson.

== Professional career ==
In 2001, Streelman turned professional. His first year on the PGA Tour was 2008, after he finished 14th at the 2007 qualifying school. He has kept his place on Tour every year since then, through 2014. He tied for the lead after the first round of the U.S. Open in 2008, and entered the top 100 of the Official World Golf Ranking for the first time in March 2009.

In March 2013, during his 153rd start on Tour, Streelman achieved his first victory at the Tampa Bay Championship. He won his second in June 2014 at the Travelers Championship, one stroke ahead of runners-up K. J. Choi and Sergio García. Streelman set a PGA Tour record by closing out his final round with seven consecutive birdies.

Hole	1	2	3	4	5	6	7	8	9	10	11	12	13	14	15	16	17	18
Par	4	4	4	4	3	5	4	3	4	4	3	4	5	4	4	3	4	4
Score	−9	−8	−8	−8	−8	−8	−7	−7	−8	−8	−8	−9	−10	−11	−12	−13	−14	−15

- Scorecard – June 22, 2014 – Cumulative tournament scores, relative to par

Streelman won the 2015 Masters Par-3 Contest.

== Personal life ==
Streelman is married to Courtney Streelman. They have two kids: Sophia and Rhett. They live in Scottsdale, Arizona.

Streelman is a Christian. Kevin and Courtney have donated to Compassion International to help build a child development center in Togo.

Streelman gifted golf clubs and a golf bag to President Donald Trump in 2017.

== Professional wins (6) ==
=== PGA Tour wins (2) ===
No.	Date	Tournament	Winning score	To par	Margin of victory	Runner(s)-up
1	Mar 17, 2013	Tampa Bay Championship	73-69-65-67=274	−10	2 strokes	(United States) Boo Weekley
2	Jun 22, 2014	Travelers Championship	69-68-64-64=265	−15	1 stroke	(South Korea) K. J. Choi, (Spain) Sergio García

=== NGA Hooters Tour wins (1) ===
No.	Date	Tournament	Winning score	To par	Margin of victory	Runner-up
1	Apr 15, 2007	Auburn-Opelika Classic	69-66-66-71=272	−16	1 stroke	(United States) Matt Every

=== Gateway Tour wins (3) ===
No.	Date	Tournament	Winning score	To par	Margin of victory	Runner-up
1	Feb 1, 2007	Desert Winter 4	69-68-69=206	−10	2 strokes	(United States) David Schultz
2	Jun 28, 2007	Desert Summer 4	66-66-66-68=266	−20	3 strokes	(United States) Chris Kamin
3	Aug 24, 2007	Desert Summer 10	67-65-66-66=264	−24	Playoff	(United States) Brian Pouty

== Results in major championships ==
Results not in chronological order in 2020.

Tournament	2008	2009	2010	2011	2012	2013	2014	2015	2016	2017	2018
Masters Tournament				CUT		CUT	T42	T12	T34		
U.S. Open	T53			67	T59	CUT	CUT		T13		
The Open Championship				CUT		T79	T54	CUT			
PGA Championship		CUT		T62		T12	CUT	T54	CUT		CUT

Tournament	2019	2020	2021	2022	2023
Masters Tournament					
PGA Championship		T58	T8	T41	
U.S. Open		CUT	T15		T49
The Open Championship	T57	NT	T19		

Top 10
Did not play

CUT = missed the halfway cut
"T" indicates a tie for a place.
NT = No tournament due to COVID-19 pandemic

=== Summary ===
Tournament	Wins	2nd	3rd	Top-5	Top-10	Top-25	Events	Cuts made
Masters Tournament	0	0	0	0	0	1	5	3
PGA Championship	0	0	0	0	1	2	10	6
U.S. Open	0	0	0	0	0	2	9	6
The Open Championship	0	0	0	0	0	1	6	4
Totals	0	0	0	0	1	6	30	19

- Most consecutive cuts made – 5 (2021 PGA – 2023 U.S. Open, current)
- Longest streak of top-10s – 1

== Results in The Players Championship ==
Tournament	2009	2010	2011	2012	2013	2014	2015	2016	2017	2018	2019
The Players Championship	CUT	CUT	T19	T51	T2	CUT	CUT	T74	T72	CUT	CUT

Tournament	2020	2021	2022	2023	2024
The Players Championship	C	CUT	T22	CUT	CUT

Top 10

CUT = missed the halfway cut
"T" indicates a tie for a place
C = Canceled after the first round due to the COVID-19 pandemic

== Results in World Golf Championships ==
Results not in chronological order before 2015.

Tournament	2011	2012	2013	2014	2015	2016	2017	2018	2019	2020	2021
Championship	T15			T25							
Match Play				R64						NT^{1}	R16
Invitational			T59	71						T35	
Champions			T34	T56						NT^{1}	NT^{1}

^{1}Cancelled due to COVID-19 pandemic

Top 10
Did not play

QF, R16, R32, R64 = Round in which player lost in match play
NT = No tournament
"T" = Tied

== U.S. national team appearances ==
Professional

- World Cup: 2013

== See also ==
- 2007 PGA Tour Qualifying School graduates
- List of Duke University people
