= David Berganio Jr. =

American professional golfer (born 1969)

Personal information
- Nationality: United States
- Born: January 14, 1969 (age 57) Los Angeles, California, U.S.
- Height: 5 ft 11 in (1.80 m)
- Weight: 170 lb (77 kg; 12 st)

Career
- Sport: Golf
- College: University of Arizona
- Turned professional: 1993
- Current tour: PGA Tour
- Professional wins: 3
- Highest ranking: 99 (January 20, 2002)

Number of wins by tour
- Korn Ferry Tour: 3

Best results in major championships
- Masters Tournament: CUT: 1992, 1997
- PGA Championship: DNP
- U.S. Open: T16: 1996
- The Open Championship: DNP

David Berganio Jr. (born January 14, 1969) is an American professional golfer who currently plays on the PGA Tour.

== Early life and amateur career ==
Berganio was born in Los Angeles, California. He won the U.S. Amateur Public Links twice (1991 and 1993) while playing college golf at the University of Arizona. He turned professional in 1993 after playing on the Walker Cup team.

== Professional career ==
In 1993, Berganio turned pro. In 1996, he played on the Nike Tour; he won the Nike Monterrey Open helping him earn a promotion to the PGA Tour. He played on tour in 1997 but was unable to maintain his status. He returned to the developmental tour where he continued to play well, winning two more events.

In 2001, he returned to the PGA Tour. His best finish on the PGA Tour came during this era at the 2002 Bob Hope Chrysler Classic; he lost a playoff to Phil Mickelson. In 2003, he suffered from a bulging disk in his back and played on a Major Medical Extension (11 events from 2004 to 2008). At the 2008 qualifying school, he finished T7 to earn a full card for the 2009 season.

Berganio received attention after he withdrew from the 2019 Rocket Mortgage Classic. His decision allowed Nate Lashley to enter the tournament and win.

== Amateur wins (3) ==
- 1991 Pacific Coast Amateur, U.S. Amateur Public Links
- 1993 U.S. Amateur Public Links

== Professional wins (3) ==
=== Buy.com Tour wins (3) ===
No.	Date	Tournament	Winning score	Margin of victory	Runner(s)-up
1	Mar 17, 1996	Nike Monterrey Open	−16 (69-68-69-66=272)	1 stroke	(Mexico) Rafael Alarcón
2	Aug 29, 1999	Nike Permian Basin Open	−19 (64-67-68-70=269)	2 strokes	(Australia) Paul Gow, (United States) Dicky Thompson
3	Aug 6, 2000	Buy.com Omaha Classic	−20 (65-67-69-67=268)	Playoff	(Canada) Ahmad Bateman

Buy.com Tour playoff record (1–0)

No.	Year	Tournament	Opponent	Result
1	2000	Buy.com Omaha Classic	(Canada) Ahmad Bateman	Won with par on second extra hole

== Playoff record ==
PGA Tour playoff record (0–1)

No.	Year	Tournament	Opponent	Result
1	2002	Bob Hope Chrysler Classic	(United States) Phil Mickelson	Lost to birdie on first extra hole

== U.S. national team appearances ==
Amateur

- Walker Cup: 1993 (winners)

== Results in major championships ==
Tournament	1992	1993	1994	1995	1996	1997	1998	1999	2000	2001	2002	2003	2004	2005	2006
Masters Tournament	CUT					CUT									
U.S. Open		CUT	T47		T16			T28	CUT						CUT

Did not play

CUT = missed the half-way cut
"T" = Tied
Note: Berganio never played in The Open Championship or the PGA Championship.

== See also ==
- 1996 Nike Tour graduates
- 2000 Buy.com Tour graduates
- 2008 PGA Tour Qualifying School graduates
