= 2012 PGA Tour Qualifying School graduates =

This is a list of the 26 players who earned their 2013 PGA Tour card through Q School in 2012. 2012 was the final year Q School would grant direct access to the PGA Tour. Future Q Schools will only grant access to the second-tier Web.com Tour. Brad Fritsch previously earned his 2013 PGA Tour card through his finish on the 2012 Web.com Tour money list; he did not count against the 25, but did improve his status.

Place	Player	PGA Tour starts	Cuts made	Notes
1	(South Korea) Lee Dong-hwan	2	0	2 Japan Golf Tour wins
T2	(England) Ross Fisher^{†}	37	24	4 European Tour wins
T2	(United States) Steve LeBrun	3	1	
T4	(United States) Kris Blanks	102	52	1 Nationwide Tour win
T4	(United States) Billy Horschel	49	26	3rd time through Q school
T4	(United States) Richard H. Lee	24	12	
T7	(United States) Erik Compton	56	34	1 Nationwide Tour win
T7	(Canada) Brad Fritsch	5	1	Also qualified via Web.com Tour finish
T7	(South Korea) Jin Park	39	14	
T10	(Argentina) Fabián Gómez	26	16	1 Nationwide Tour win
T10	(United States) Jeff Gove	163	73	3 Nationwide Tour wins
T10	(United States) Michael Letzig	97	57	
T10	(Australia) Steven Bowditch	75	23	2 Nationwide Tour wins, 3 PGA Tour of Australasia wins
T14	(Australia) Matt Jones	120	64	
T14	(Sweden) Robert Karlsson	103	72	11 European Tour wins
T14	(United States) Eric Meierdierks	1	0	Survived all four stages of Q School
T17	(United States) Scott Langley	6	4	
T17	(United States) Aaron Watkins	21	7	
T17	(United States) Derek Ernst	1	1	Survived all four stages of Q School
T20	(United States) Tag Ridings	182	93	1 Nationwide Tour win
T20	(South Korea) Kim Si-woo	0	0	Did not become a PGA Tour member until he turned 18 on June 28, 2013
T22	(Sweden) Henrik Norlander	0	0	Survived all four stages of Q School
T22	(United States) Patrick Reed^{†}	15	9	Monday-qualified 6 times in 2012
T22	(United States) Bobby Gates	61	28	1 Nationwide Tour win
T22	(United States) Donald Constable	0	0	Survived all four stages of Q School
T22	(United States) Chez Reavie	131	75	1 PGA Tour win

- Players in yellow were 2013 PGA Tour rookies.
- ^{†}: First-time PGA Tour member in 2013, but ineligible for rookie status due to having played eight or more Tour events in a previous season

== 2013 Results ==
Player	Starts	Cuts made	Best finish	Money list rank	Earnings ($)	FedEx Cup rank
(South Korea) Lee Dong-hwan*	22	12	T3	95	882,793	119
(England) Ross Fisher^{†}	15	7	T10	161	311,168	161
(United States) Steve LeBrun*	21	11	T15	158	337,157	151
(United States) Kris Blanks	1	0	Cut	n/a	0	n/a
(United States) Billy Horschel	25	21	Win	13	3,501,703	16
(United States) Richard H. Lee	24	17	T9	89	920,836	96
(United States) Erik Compton	24	13	T4	122	651,660	99
(Canada) Brad Fritsch*	24	18	T9	142	452,184	129
(South Korea) Jin Park	20	5	T20	195	136,457	189
(Argentina) Fabián Gómez	23	10	T2	128	586,942	133
(United States) Jeff Gove	17	4	T40	215	53,401	208
(United States) Michael Letzig	17	4	T47	220	45,626	219
(Australia) Steven Bowditch	22	11	T2	118	697,775	124
(Australia) Matt Jones	24	18	T2	48	1,724,707	32
(Sweden) Robert Karlsson	18	9	T4	143	444,238	156
(United States) Eric Meierdierks*	19	4	T35	212	58,029	207
(United States) Scott Langley*	27	12	T3	127	590,684	122
(United States) Aaron Watkins	19	3	T8	179	217,495	187
(United States) Derek Ernst*	21	7	Win	66	1,330,856	93
(United States) Tag Ridings	24	10	T9	147	428,922	142
(South Korea) Kim Si-woo*	8	0	Cut	n/a	0	n/a
(Sweden) Henrik Norlander*	22	13	T15	151	401,958	159
(United States) Patrick Reed^{†}	26	16	Win	35	1,961,519	54
(United States) Bobby Gates	20	4	T4	159	320,248	179
(United States) Donald Constable*	16	0	Cut	n/a	0	n/a
(United States) Chez Reavie	22	14	T11	126	590,925	118

- *PGA Tour rookie in 2013
- ^{†}First-time PGA Tour member in 2013, but ineligible for rookie status due to having played eight or more Tour events in a previous season
- T = Tied
- Retained his PGA Tour card for 2014: won or finished in the top 125 of the money list or FedEx Cup points list.
- Retained PGA Tour conditional status and qualified for the Web.com Tour Finals: finished between 126–150 on FedEx Cup list and qualified for Web.com Tour Finals.
- Failed to retain his PGA Tour card for 2014 but qualified for the Web.com Tour Finals: finished between 150–200 on FedEx Cup list.
- Failed to retain his PGA Tour card for 2014 and to qualify for the Web.com Tour Finals: finished outside the top 200 on FedEx Cup list.

Brad Fritsch and Bobby Gates regained their cards for 2014 through the Web.com Tour Finals.

== Winners on the PGA Tour in 2013 ==
No.	Date	Winner	Tournament	Runner-up	Winning score	Margin of victory
1	Apr 28	(United States) Billy Horschel	Zurich Classic of New Orleans	(United States) D. A. Points	−20 (67-71-66-64=268)	1 stroke
2	May 5	(United States) Derek Ernst	Wells Fargo Championship	(England) David Lynn	−8 (67-71-72-70=280)	Playoff, 1st hole
3	Aug 18	(United States) Patrick Reed	Wyndham Championship	(United States) Jordan Spieth	−14 (65-64-71-66=266)	Playoff, 2nd hole

== Runners-up on the PGA Tour in 2013 ==
No.	Date	Player	Tournament	Winner	Winning score	Runner-up score
1	Mar 10	(Argentina) Fabián Gómez	Puerto Rico Open	(United States) Scott Brown	−20 (68-63-67-70=268)	−19 (69-64-65-71=269)
2	Jul 7	(Australia) Steven Bowditch	Greenbrier Classic	(Sweden) Jonas Blixt	−13 (66-67-67-67=267)	−11 (65-67-69-68=269)
3	Jul 7	(Australia) Matt Jones	Greenbrier Classic	(Sweden) Jonas Blixt	−13 (66-67-67-67=267)	−11 (69-66-66-68=269)

== See also ==
- 2012 Web.com Tour graduates
