= 2008 U.S. Open (golf) =

Coordinates: 32.904°N 117.246°W

Tournament information
- Dates: June 12–16, 2008
- Location: San Diego, California
- Courses: Torrey Pines Golf Course, South Course
- Organized by: USGA
- Tours: PGA Tour; European Tour; Japan Golf Tour

Statistics
- Par: 71
- Length: 7,643 yards (6,989 m)
- Field: 156 players, 80 after cut
- Cut: 149 (+7)
- Prize fund: $7,500,000 €4,766,396
- Winner's share: $1,350,000 €858,181

Champion
- (United States) Tiger Woods
- 283 (−1), playoff

Location in the United States
Location in California

The 2008 United States Open Championship was the 108th U.S. Open, played June 12–16 at Torrey Pines Golf Course in San Diego, California. Tiger Woods won his third U.S. Open and 14th major title, defeating Rocco Mediate on the first hole of sudden-death, following an 18-hole playoff. With this victory, Woods joined Jack Nicklaus as the only two players to win the career grand slam three times. The U.S. Open was held at Torrey Pines Golf Course for the first time, on its South Course.

It was an unlikely victory for Woods, who entered the tournament considerably short of match practice and was plagued throughout the week by an ailing left knee. Two days after the championship, Woods revealed that he would miss the remainder of the 2008 season after undergoing knee surgery; this was his last win in a major championship until the 2019 Masters.

This was the final 18-hole playoff at the U.S. Open. A two-hole aggregate playoff was introduced by the United States Golf Association (USGA) in 2018.

== Field ==
About half the field each year consists of players who are fully exempt from qualifying for the U.S. Open. Below is the list of the 72 players that were fully exempt for the 2008 U.S. Open. Each player is classified according to the first category by which he qualified, but other categories are shown in parentheses:

1. Last 10 U.S. Open Champions

Ángel Cabrera (8,11,17), Michael Campbell, Jim Furyk (8,9,17), Retief Goosen (11,17), Lee Janzen (8), Geoff Ogilvy (9,12,17), Tiger Woods (3,4,5,8,9,10,12,13,17)

2. Top two finishers in the 2007 U.S. Amateur

Michael Thompson

- Colt Knost forfeited his exemption by turning professional.

3. Last five Masters Champions

Trevor Immelman (17), Zach Johnson (9,17), Phil Mickelson (5,9,12,13,17)

4. Last five British Open Champions

Ben Curtis, Todd Hamilton, Pádraig Harrington (9,11,17)

5. Last five PGA Champions

Vijay Singh (9,12,17)

- Shaun Micheel withdrew prior to the tournament.

6. The Players Champion

Sergio García (9,11,12,17)

7. The U.S. Senior Open Champion

Brad Bryant

8. Top 15 finishers and ties in the 2007 U.S. Open

Stephen Ames (17), Aaron Baddeley (9,17), Paul Casey (11,17), Nick Dougherty (11), Niclas Fasth (11,17), Jerry Kelly, Hunter Mahan (9,17), Justin Rose (9,11,17), Steve Stricker (9,17), David Toms, Scott Verplank (9,17), Bubba Watson

9. Top 30 leaders on the 2007 PGA Tour official money list

Robert Allenby (17), Woody Austin (17), Mark Calcavecchia, K. J. Choi (13,17), Stewart Cink (12,17), Tim Clark (17), Luke Donald (17), Ernie Els (11,17), Steve Flesch (13), Charles Howell III, John Rollins, Rory Sabbatini (17), Adam Scott (17), Heath Slocum, Brandt Snedeker (17), Boo Weekley (12,17)

- Brett Wetterich withdrew prior to the tournament.

10. All players qualifying for the 2007 edition of The Tour Championship

Jonathan Byrd, Camilo Villegas

11. Top 15 on the 2007 European Tour Order of Merit

Søren Hansen (17), Colin Montgomerie, Andrés Romero (17), Henrik Stenson (17), Richard Sterne (17), Lee Westwood (17)

12. Top 10 on the PGA Tour official money list, as of May 26

Ryuji Imada, Anthony Kim (17), Jeff Quinney (17)

13. Winners of multiple PGA Tour events from April 25, 2007, through June 1, 2008

Daniel Chopra

14. Top 2 from the 2008 European Tour Order of Merit, as of May 26

Miguel Ángel Jiménez (17), Oliver Wilson (17)

15. Top 2 on the 2007 Japan Golf Tour official money list, provided they are within the top 75 point leaders of the Official World Golf Rankings at that time

Shingo Katayama (17), Toru Taniguchi (17)

16. Top 2 on the 2007 PGA Tour of Australasia official money list, provided they are within the top 75 point leaders of the Official World Golf Rankings at that time

- Craig Parry and David Smail were not ranked in the top 75.

17. Top 50 on the Official World Golf Rankings list, as of May 26

Stuart Appleby, J. B. Holmes, Robert Karlsson, Martin Kaymer, Justin Leonard, Rod Pampling, Ian Poulter, Mike Weir

- Sean O'Hair withdrew prior to the tournament.

18. Special exemptions selected by the USGA

None

Sectional qualifiers

- Japan: Artemio Murakami, Craig Parry
- England: Phillip Archer, Robert Dinwiddie, Johan Edfors, Ross Fisher, Alastair Forsyth, Thomas Levet, Ross McGowan
- United States

- Daly City, California: Michael Allen, Craig Barlow, Garrett Chaussard (L), Jordan Cox (a,L), John Ellis (L), Jason Gore, Jeff Wilson (a,L)
- Littleton, Colorado: Jay Choi (L), Brian Kortan (L)
- Tequesta, Florida: Bobby Collins (L), Philippe Gasnier (L), Joey Lamielle (L)
- Roswell, Georgia: Jason Bohn, Matt Kuchar, D. J. Trahan
- Lake Forest, Illinois: Hunter Haas (L), Chris Kirk (L), Ian Leggatt (L), Mark O'Meara, D. A. Points (L), Jon Turcott (L)
- Beallsville, Maryland: Brian Bergstol (L), David Hearn (L)
- Augusta, Missouri: Robert Gaus (L)
- Purchase, New York: Yohann Benson (L), Jeffrey Bors (L), Michael Gilmore (L), Kevin Silva (L)
- Columbus, Ohio: Eric Axley, Bart Bryant, Chad Campbell, Ben Crane, Derek Fathauer (a,L), Robert Garrigus, Justin Hicks (L), Freddie Jacobson, Dustin Johnson, Davis Love III, Jarrod Lyle, John Mallinger, Steve Marino, Rocco Mediate, Jon Mills, Joe Ogilvie, Jesper Parnevik, Pat Perez, Carl Pettersson, Kyle Stanley (a), Kevin Tway (a), Nick Watney, Dean Wilson
- Springfield, Ohio: Chris Devlin (L), Andrew Dresser (L), Sean English (L), Fernando Figueroa (L), Jimmy Henderson (a,L), Peter Tomasulo (L)
- Creswell, Oregon: Rob Rashell (L), Nick Taylor (a)
- Cordova, Tennessee: Travis Bertoni (L), D. J. Brigman, Mathew Goggin, Brandt Jobe, Michael Letzig, John Merrick, Scott Piercy (L), Michael Quagliano (a,L), Brett Quigley, Patrick Sheehan, Scott Sterling, Kevin Streelman (L), Chris Stroud (L), Casey Wittenberg (L)
- Richmond, Texas: Rich Beem, Charlie Beljan (L)

Alternates who gained entry

- Rickie Fowler (a, Columbus) – replaced Shaun Micheel
- Gary Wolstenholme (a, England) – replaced Sean O'Hair
- Andrew Svoboda (L, Purchase) – replaced Brett Wetterich

(a) denotes amateur
(L) denotes player advanced through local qualifying

== Course layout ==
South Course

| Hole | 1 | 2 | 3 | 4 | 5 | 6 | 7 | 8 | 9 | Out | 10 | 11 | 12 | 13 | 14 | 15 | 16 | 17 | 18 | In | Total |
|---|---|---|---|---|---|---|---|---|---|---|---|---|---|---|---|---|---|---|---|---|---|
| Yards | 448 | 389 | 195 | 488 | 453 | 515 | 461 | 177 | 612 | 3,738 | 414 | 221 | 504 | 614 | 435 | 478 | 225 | 441 | 573 | 3,905 | 7,643 |
| Par | 4 | 4 | 3 | 4 | 4 | 4 | 4 | 3 | 5 | 35 | 4 | 3 | 4 | 5 | 4 | 4 | 3 | 4 | 5 | 36 | 71 |

== Round summaries ==
=== First round ===
Thursday, June 12, 2008

The leaders after the first round were two little-known American players, Justin Hicks, a 33-year-old Nationwide Tour player, and Kevin Streelman, a 29-year-old PGA Tour rookie. They both shot 3 under-par 68s to lead four other players at 69 (−2), including the 2006 champion, Geoff Ogilvy. The top three ranked players in the world were paired together for the first two rounds, but none of them broke par for the day: Woods 72 (+1), Phil Mickelson 71 (E), Adam Scott 73 (+2). Woods was playing his first event since the Masters, after undergoing arthroscopic knee surgery, and Scott was playing with a broken little finger on his right hand. The World Golf Rankings were also used for three other pairings, making four pairings include the top 12 golfers in the world. Defending champion Ángel Cabrera shot 79 (+8). Mark Calcavecchia withdrew after playing nine holes with an injured knee and foot. In all, 11 players shot sub-par rounds and the scoring average was 75.58.

| Place | Player | Score | To par |
|---|---|---|---|
| T1 | (United States) Justin Hicks | 68 | −3 |
| T1 | (United States) Kevin Streelman | 68 | −3 |
| T3 | (Australia) Stuart Appleby | 69 | −2 |
| T3 | (United States) Eric Axley | 69 | −2 |
| T3 | (United States) Rocco Mediate | 69 | −2 |
| T3 | (Australia) Geoff Ogilvy | 69 | −2 |
| T7 | (Australia) Robert Allenby | 70 | −1 |
| T7 | (South Africa) Ernie Els | 70 | −1 |
| T7 | (United States) Rickie Fowler (a) | 70 | −1 |
| T7 | (Sweden) Robert Karlsson | 70 | −1 |
| T7 | (England) Lee Westwood | 70 | −1 |

=== Second round ===
Friday, June 13, 2008

The first round co-leaders both fell well down the leaderboard: Justin Hicks shot an 80 (+9) to drop to a tie for 49th and Kevin Streelman shot 77 (+6) to drop to tied for 22nd. Stuart Appleby carded a 70 (−1) to take the lead at 139 (−3), one stroke ahead of Robert Karlsson, Mediate, and Woods. Woods shot a 30 on the front nine, one stroke more than the U.S. Open record for nine holes set by Vijay Singh in 2003. Singh made his 14th consecutive cut at the U.S. Open, the longest current streak. Miguel Ángel Jiménez shot the low round of the day −5 (66) and moved into a tie for 5th.

The cut was at +7 (149), 10 strokes from the leader, and 80 players made the cut. Defending champion Cabrera shot a 76 (+5) for at total of 155 (+13) to miss the cut by six shots. Ian Poulter withdrew with a wrist injury after playing 15 holes. Three amateurs made the cut: Derek Fathauer (+4), Michael Thompson (+5), and Rickie Fowler (+7).

In all, 19 players shot sub-par second rounds. The scoring average was 74.96 for round two and 75.27 overall.

| Place | Player | Score | To par |
|---|---|---|---|
| 1 | (Australia) Stuart Appleby | 69-70=139 | −3 |
| T2 | (Sweden) Robert Karlsson | 70-70=140 | −2 |
| T2 | (United States) Rocco Mediate | 69-71=140 | −2 |
| T2 | (United States) Tiger Woods | 72-68=140 | −2 |
| T5 | (Spain) Miguel Ángel Jiménez | 75-66=141 | −1 |
| T5 | (United States) Davis Love III | 72-69=141 | −1 |
| T5 | (United States) D. J. Trahan | 72-69=141 | −1 |
| T5 | (England) Lee Westwood | 70-71=141 | −1 |
| T9 | (Australia) Robert Allenby | 70-72=142 | E |
| T9 | (South Africa) Ernie Els | 70-72=142 | E |
| T9 | (Australia) Geoff Ogilvy | 69-73=142 | E |
| T9 | (Sweden) Carl Pettersson | 71-71=142 | E |

Amateurs: Fathauer (+4), Thompson (+5), Fowler (+7), Stanley (+8), Taylor (+10), Tway (+11), Cox (+15), Wilson (+17), Henderson (+21), Wolstenholme (+23), Quagliano (+25).

=== Third round ===
Saturday, June 14, 2008

Overnight leader Stuart Appleby shot 79 (+8) to slip back to T-19 at 218 (+5), while playing partner Rocco Mediate shot 72 (+1) to finish two strokes behind at 212 (−1). Many of the leaders struggled on day three. Karlsson and Jiménez dropped back to 215 (+2), Davis Love III to 4 over-par and D. J. Trahan to 1 over-par. Lee Westwood finished at 211 (−2) after a round of 70, the only one to shoot par or better in all three rounds. Woods, despite struggling with his knee injury, dazzled on the back nine with some improbable shots, resulting in two eagles on the 13th and 18th and a chip-in birdie from the rough on the 17th to take the 54-hole lead at 210 (−3), a stroke ahead of Westwood. Brandt Snedeker shot the low round of the day at 68 (-3). In total, 11 players shot sub-par rounds and the scoring average for the round was 74.36 and 75.08 overall.

| Place | Player | Score | To par |
|---|---|---|---|
| 1 | (United States) Tiger Woods | 72-68-70=210 | −3 |
| 2 | (England) Lee Westwood | 70-71-70=211 | −2 |
| 3 | (United States) Rocco Mediate | 69-71-72=212 | −1 |
| T4 | (Australia) Geoff Ogilvy | 69-73-72=214 | +1 |
| T4 | (United States) D. J. Trahan | 72-69-73=214 | +1 |
| T6 | (Australia) Robert Allenby | 70-72-73=215 | +2 |
| T6 | (Spain) Miguel Ángel Jiménez | 75-66-74=215 | +2 |
| T6 | (Sweden) Robert Karlsson | 70-70-75=215 | +2 |
| T6 | (United States) Hunter Mahan | 72-74-69=215 | +2 |
| T6 | (Colombia) Camilo Villegas | 73-71-71=215 | +2 |

=== Final round ===
Sunday, June 15, 2008

Woods had previously won each of the thirteen major championships in which he entered the final round with at least a share of the lead, and his fourteenth was no different. He lost his lead on the first hole, double-bogeying the hole for the third time in the tournament, and followed that with a bogey on the second, but regained two of the shots with birdies on 9 and 11. He also bogeyed 13, the same hole on which he had sunk an eagle putt the previous day.

Mediate had put together a solid round, only scoring one bogey over the final 13 holes. However, he barely missed a birdie putt on 17 and hit a wedge too strong on 18; his pars on the two final holes kept both Woods and his playing partner Westwood in contention. Both came to the par-5 final hole one shot behind Mediate, who was in the clubhouse at 283 (−1).

Woods and Westwood both hit their drives into bunkers and had to lay up. Woods' second shot went into the rough; Westwood laid up in the fairway. Both reached the green with their third shots, leaving them with birdie putts to force an 18-hole playoff with Mediate. Westwood's 15-foot (4.6 m) putt, which had a severe break to the right, was not successful. Woods' putt was closer at 12 feet (3.7 m), with a much less severe break; his putt lipped the hole before dropping and putting him in the playoff. Both Woods and Mediate became the first to finish under par at the U.S. Open since 2004.

Heath Slocum shot the low round of the day (and the tournament) at 65 (−6). In total, 12 players shot sub-par rounds and the scoring average for the round was 72.87 and 74.71 overall.

| Place | Player | Score | To par | Money ($) |
|---|---|---|---|---|
| T1 | (United States) Tiger Woods | 72-68-70-73=283 | −1 | Playoff |
| T1 | (United States) Rocco Mediate | 69-71-72-71=283 | −1 | Playoff |
| 3 | (England) Lee Westwood | 70-71-70-73=284 | E | 491,995 |
| T4 | (Sweden) Robert Karlsson | 70-70-75-71=286 | +2 | 307,303 |
| T4 | (United States) D. J. Trahan | 72-69-73-72=286 | +2 | 307,303 |
| T6 | (Sweden) Carl Pettersson | 71-71-77-68=287 | +3 | 220,686 |
| T6 | (United States) John Merrick | 73-72-71-71=287 | +3 | 220,686 |
| T6 | (Spain) Miguel Ángel Jiménez | 75-66-74-72=287 | +3 | 220,686 |
| T9 | (United States) Heath Slocum | 75-74-74-65=288 | +4 | 160,769 |
| T9 | (United States) Eric Axley | 69-79-71-69=288 | +4 | 160,769 |
| T9 | (United States) Brandt Snedeker | 76-73-68-71=288 | +4 | 160,769 |
| T9 | (Colombia) Camilo Villegas | 73-71-71-73=288 | +4 | 160,769 |
| T9 | (Australia) Geoff Ogilvy | 69-73-72-74=288 | +4 | 160,769 |

Amateurs: Thompson (+8), Fowler (+13), Fathauer (+15).

==== Scorecard ====
Final round

| Hole | 1 | 2 | 3 | 4 | 5 | 6 | 7 | 8 | 9 | 10 | 11 | 12 | 13 | 14 | 15 | 16 | 17 | 18 |
|---|---|---|---|---|---|---|---|---|---|---|---|---|---|---|---|---|---|---|
| Par | 4 | 4 | 3 | 4 | 4 | 4 | 4 | 3 | 5 | 4 | 3 | 4 | 5 | 4 | 4 | 3 | 4 | 5 |
| (United States) Woods | −1 | E | E | E | E | E | E | E | −1 | −1 | −2 | −2 | −1 | −1 | E | E | E | −1 |
| (United States) Mediate | −1 | −2 | −2 | −2 | −1 | E | E | E | E | −1 | −1 | −1 | −1 | −2 | −1 | −1 | −1 | −1 |
| (England) Westwood | −1 | −1 | −1 | −1 | −1 | −1 | −1 | −1 | −2 | −1 | −1 | E | +1 | E | E | E | E | E |
| (Sweden) Karlsson | +2 | +2 | +1 | +1 | +1 | +1 | +2 | +2 | +3 | +3 | +2 | +3 | +3 | +2 | +3 | +4 | +3 | +2 |
| (United States) Trahan | +2 | +3 | +3 | +4 | +5 | +5 | +4 | +3 | +3 | +3 | +2 | +2 | +1 | +1 | +1 | +2 | +3 | +2 |
| (Spain) Jiménez | +3 | +3 | +3 | +3 | +3 | +3 | +3 | +3 | +4 | +4 | +5 | +5 | +6 | +5 | +4 | +4 | +4 | +3 |
| (United States) Merrick | +4 | +4 | +3 | +3 | +4 | +4 | +4 | +4 | +3 | +3 | +3 | +3 | +3 | +3 | +4 | +4 | +4 | +3 |
| (Sweden) Pettersson | +5 | +5 | +5 | +4 | +3 | +3 | +3 | +3 | +4 | +4 | +4 | +5 | +5 | +4 | +4 | +3 | +3 | +3 |
| (Australia) Ogilvy | +1 | +1 | +1 | +2 | +1 | +1 | E | E | +1 | +2 | +2 | +2 | +2 | +2 | +2 | +3 | +4 | +4 |

Cumulative tournament scores, relative to par

| Birdie | Bogey | Double bogey |

=== Playoff ===
Monday, June 16, 2008

The 18-hole playoff was the first playoff for the U.S. Open since 2001. After trading the lead three times on the front nine, Woods built a three stroke lead through ten holes. Mediate rallied on the back nine with three consecutive birdies which gave him a one stroke lead heading to the 18th hole. Like the day before, Woods birdied to tie Mediate and forced the playoff into sudden-death, the third in U.S. Open history (1990, 1994; previously, extra full rounds were played, with the last in 1946).

The sudden-death playoff started and ended at the par-4 7th hole; Woods left his birdie putt inches short and tapped in, while Mediate's tee shot found the left fairway bunker and his 18-foot (5.5 m) putt to save par missed right.

| Place | Player | Score | To par | Sudden death | Money ($) |
|---|---|---|---|---|---|
| 1 | (United States) Tiger Woods | 71 | E | 4 | 1,350,000 |
| 2 | (United States) Rocco Mediate | 71 | E | 5 | 810,000 |

The playoff started at noon Eastern on ESPN, with NBC taking over at 2 p.m. Eastern and showing the final ten holes; ESPN's two hours earned the highest ever ratings for golf coverage on cable at the time, while NBC had the highest-rated Monday golf broadcast since 1978.

With the win, Woods kept his unbeaten streak alive when he has at least a share of the lead heading into the final round of a major championship (14−0). The streak ended at the PGA Championship in 2009.

==== Scorecard ====
| Hole | 1 | 2 | 3 | 4 | 5 | 6 | 7 | 8 | 9 | 10 | 11 | 12 | 13 | 14 | 15 | 16 | 17 | 18 |
|---|---|---|---|---|---|---|---|---|---|---|---|---|---|---|---|---|---|---|
| Par | 4 | 4 | 3 | 4 | 4 | 4 | 4 | 3 | 5 | 4 | 3 | 4 | 5 | 4 | 4 | 3 | 4 | 5 |
| (United States) Woods | E | E | +1 | +1 | +1 | E | −1 | E | E | E | +1 | +2 | +1 | +1 | +1 | +1 | +1 | E |
| (United States) Mediate | +1 | +1 | E | E | +1 | +1 | +1 | +1 | +2 | +3 | +3 | +3 | +2 | +1 | E | E | E | E |
Sudden-death Playoff
| (United States) Woods | | | | | | | E | | | | | | | | | | | |
| (United States) Mediate | | | | | | | +1 | | | | | | | | | | | |

| Birdie | Bogey |

== Woods' injury ==
Two months earlier on April 15, Woods had arthroscopic surgery on his left knee. During his rehab, Woods sustained a double stress fracture of his left tibia. Throughout the tournament it was clear Woods was in pain, and the general feeling was that he was just returning from the initial surgery too soon. He did not reveal the news about the fracture until Wednesday, two days after the Monday playoff. He had surgery to repair his anterior cruciate ligament (ACL) and needed time to rehab that and the stress fracture, and announced on his website that he would miss the remainder of the 2008 season.
