= Tyler Aldridge =

American professional golfer (born 1984)

Personal information
- Nationality: United States
- Born: September 2, 1984 (age 42) Caldwell, Idaho, U.S.
- Height: 6 ft 0 in (183 cm)
- Weight: 175 lb (79 kg)

Career
- Sport: Golf
- College: Boise State University
- Turned professional: 2004
- Current tour: Web.com Tour
- Former tour: PGA Tour
- Professional wins: 2

Number of wins by tour
- Korn Ferry Tour: 1
- Other: 1

Tyler Aldridge (born September 2, 1984) is an American professional golfer.

== Early life and amateur career ==
Aldridge was born in Caldwell, Idaho. He attended Boise State University. He was on the golf team.

== Professional career ==
In 2004, Aldridge turned professional. He played on the mini-tours before starting on the Nationwide Tour in 2008. He earned his 2009 PGA Tour card at Qualifying School in 2008 and split the 2009 season between the PGA Tour (three cuts made in 17 starts) and the Nationwide Tour (five cuts in 11 events). He played on PGA Tour Canada from 2012 to 2014 with a best finish of tied for second at the 2013 Times Colonist Island Savings Open.

He was back on the Web.com Tour in 2015, after coming through Qualifying School with one stroke to spare, and won the inaugural Greater Dallas Open in June.

== Professional wins (2) ==
=== Web.com Tour wins (1) ===
No.	Date	Tournament	Winning score	Margin of victory	Runners-up
1	Jun 7, 2015	Greater Dallas Open	−23 (67-65-65-68=265)	2 strokes	(Brazil) Lucas Lee, (United States) Greg Yates

=== Other wins (1) ===
- 2006 Idaho Open

== See also ==
- 2008 PGA Tour Qualifying School graduates
- 2015 Web.com Tour Finals graduates
