= Ben Kern =

American professional golfer (born 1984)

Personal information
- Nationality: United States
- Born: July 31, 1984 (age 42) Tucson, Arizona, U.S.
- Height: 6 ft 1 in (185 cm)
- Weight: 275 lb (125 kg)

Career
- Sport: Golf
- College: Kansas State University
- Turned professional: 2007
- Former tour: Gateway Tour
- Professional wins: 12

Best results in major championships
- Masters Tournament: DNP
- PGA Championship: T43: 2018
- U.S. Open: DNP
- The Open Championship: DNP

Ben Kern (born July 31, 1984) is an American professional golfer. He made the cut and was the lowest club pro at the 2026 PGA Championship. He achieved this by shooting the most birdies in the field over the first two rounds. During the 2026 PGA Championship, he was noted for his unconventional appearance as a professional golfer, with a stocky build and full sleeve tattoo on his left arm. It was the second time Kern made the cut at the PGA Championship, finishing T43 in 2018.

Kern is the general manager at Hickory Hills Golf Club in Ohio. Kern is a member of the Southern Ohio section of the PGA.

== Professional wins (12) ==
=== Gateway Tour (3) ===
- 2007 Desert Winter 6
- 2008 Desert Winter 2, Winter Series Championship

=== Other wins (9) ===
- 2009 New Mexico Open
- 2017 Northern Texas PGA Championship
- 2018 Texas State Open
- 2021 Southern Texas PGA Championship, Northern Texas PGA Memorial Championship
- 2022 Southern Texas PGA Traditions Championship
- 2023 Southern Ohio PGA Professional Championship
- 2024 Southern Ohio PGA Tour Championship
- 2025 Southern Ohio PGA Match Play Championship

== U.S. national team appearances ==
- PGA Cup: 2019 (winners), 2026
