= Gary Christian =

English professional golfer (born 1971)

Personal information
- Full name: Gary John Christian
- Nationality: England
- Born: 7 August 1971 (age 55) Carshalton, England
- Height: 5 ft 8 in (1.73 m)
- Weight: 165 lb (75 kg; 11.8 st)

Career
- Sport: Golf
- College: Wallace State Community College; Auburn University
- Turned professional: 1997
- Former tours: PGA Tour; Web.com Tour; Gateway Tour various mini-tours
- Professional wins: Over 30

Number of wins by tour
- Korn Ferry Tour: 2
- Other: Over 30

Gary John Christian (born 7 August 1971) is an English professional golfer who has played on the Web.com Tour and the PGA Tour.

== Early life and amateur career ==
Christian was born in Carshalton, England. He is named after Gary Player. As a junior, he played golf at Addington Palace Golf Club, England.

Christian went to college in the United States, first on an academic scholarship to Wallace State Community College in Alabama after being spotted by talent scouts at a trial. He was later offered a place at Auburn University, again on a scholarship. He spent two years at Auburn, graduating in 1995.

== Professional career ==
In 1997, Christian turned professional and won four times in his first year on the TearDrop Tour. He was a member of the Nationwide Tour in 1999 and for several seasons from 2006. Christian picked up his first win on tour at the 2009 Northeast Pennsylvania Classic, where he defeated Mathias Grönberg in a playoff that went to nine holes, equaling a Nationwide Tour record for longest playoff.

At age 40, Christian finally graduated to the PGA Tour after finishing ninth on the Nationwide Tour's money list. Christian had never played in a PGA Tour event until 2012. He played in 28 events in 2012, making 18 cuts and having a best finish of T-10 at the RBC Canadian Open.

Christian has played on several mini-tours during his career, winning over 30 events. The tours he has won on include the Gateway Tour, Dakotas Tour, Emerald Coast Tour, DP Tour, TearDrop Tour and the Tight Lies Tour. He was the leading money winner on the Dakotas Tour in 2002 and 2005.

Christian appeared on the TV show The Weakest Link in 2001. After Christian's touring career ended, he became a commentator on The Golf Channel.

== Professional wins ==
=== Nationwide Tour wins (2) ===
No.	Date	Tournament	Winning score	Margin of victory	Runner-up
1	30 Aug 2009	Northeast Pennsylvania Classic	−15 (68-70-63-64=265)	Playoff	(Sweden) Mathias Grönberg
2	4 Sep 2011	Mylan Classic	−17 (68-63-69-67=267)	1 stroke	(United States) John Mallinger

Nationwide Tour playoff record (1–0)

No.	Year	Tournament	Opponent	Result
1	2009	Northeast Pennsylvania Classic	(Sweden) Mathias Grönberg	Won with birdie on ninth extra hole

=== Gateway Tour wins (4) ===
No.	Date	Tournament	Winning score	Margin of victory	Runner-up
1	11 Feb 2005	RTJT Series at Magnolia Grove	−6 (71-70-70-71=282)	2 strokes	(United States) Dustin Bray
2	18 Feb 2005	RTJT Series at Cambrian Ridge	−20 (63-63-67-71=264)	14 strokes	(United States) Chip Deason
3	4 Mar 2005	RTJT Series at Capital Hill (Legislator)	−1 (73-71-72-71=287)	3 strokes	(United States) Daniel Ozley
4	29 Apr 2005	RTJT Series at The Shoals	−1 (72-72-68-75=287)	Playoff	(United States) Tommy Gainey

=== Tarheel Tour wins (1) ===
No.	Date	Tournament	Winning score	Margin of victory	Runner-up
1	9 Jun 2005	Eagle Chase Classic	−11 (68-70-67=205)	1 stroke	(United States) Rich Mudd

=== Other wins ===
- 1995 Holiday Beach Club tournament (Emerald Coast Tour, as an amateur)
- 1997–98 four wins on the TearDrop Tour
- 2001 MGC Great Plains Open (Dakotas Tour)
- 2002 Sprint PCS Open at Chennault Park (Tight Lies Tour), Stylecraft/Camp Foster Pro-Am (Dakotas Tour), Red Mike Pro-Am (Dakotas Tour), Western North Dakota Charity Pro-Am (Dakotas Tour)
- 2004 Nebraska Open, San Juan Open, Western North Dakota Pro-Am (Dakotas Tour)
- 2005 Western North Dakota Charity Pro-Am (Dakotas Tour)

== See also ==
- 2011 Nationwide Tour graduates
