= Brian Vranesh =

American golfer (born 1977)

Personal information
- Nationality: United States
- Born: October 26, 1977 (age 49) Northridge, California, U.S.
- Height: 6 ft 5 in (1.96 m)
- Weight: 180 lb (82 kg; 13 st)

Career
- Sport: Golf
- College: College of the Canyons
- Turned professional: 1999
- Former tours: PGA Tour; Web.com Tour; Gateway Tour
- Professional wins: 6

Brian Vranesh (born October 26, 1977) is an American professional golfer who has played on the PGA Tour and Web.com.

== Early life and amateur career ==
Vranesh was born in Northridge, California. He attended the College of the Canyons.

== Professional career ==
In 1999, Vranesh turned professional. He has no professional wins. Vranesh did, however, come close, at the Chitimacha Louisiana Open (a Nationwide Tour event), when he lost in a one hole playoff to Bubba Dickerson. On the PGA Tour, his best finish is tied for 8th at the 2009 Buick Open.

After his playing days ended, Vranesh became a caddy. He was on the bag for Kevin Chappell in 2019 before working for Kim Si-woo in 2021.

== Personal life ==
Vranesh is the cousin of Jon Garland, pitcher for the Los Angeles Dodgers.

== Professional wins (6) ==
=== Gateway Tour wins (3) ===
No.	Date	Tournament	Winning score	To par	Margin of victory	Runner(s)-up
1	Jul 13, 2007	Desert Summer 5	66-67-67=200	−16	2 strokes	(United States) Chris Kamin, (United States) Chris Sessler
2	Apr 4, 2008	Desert Spring 3	68-67-68=203	−13	3 strokes	(Canada) Derek Gillespie, (United States) Andres Gonzales, (United States) Jerry Smith
3	Jul 11, 2008	Desert Summer 5	68-68-66=202	−14	Playoff	(South Africa) Warren Schutte
4	Feb 17, 2011	Arizona Series 5	65-65-70=200	−13	1 stroke	(United States) Kendall Critchfield, (Canada) Derek Gillespie, (United States) Colby Myers
5	May 20, 2011	Arizona Series 15	63-68-68=199	−17	7 strokes	(United States) Benoit Beisser, (United States) Dodge Kemmer, (United States) Drew Stoltz
6	Sep 28, 2012	Q School Challenge 1				

== Playoff record ==
Nationwide Tour playoff record (0–1)

No.	Year	Tournament	Opponent	Result
1	2009	Chitimacha Louisiana Open	(United States) Bubba Dickerson	Lost to birdie on first extra hole

== See also ==
- 2008 PGA Tour Qualifying School graduates
