= Gateway Tour seasons =

This page lists all Gateway Tour seasons from its inaugural season in 2002.

Since 2002, the Gateway Tour's schedules have included events in Alabama, Arizona, California, Florida and Texas.

== 2002 season ==
=== Schedule ===
The following table lists official events during the 2002 season.

Date	Tournament	Location	Purse (US$)	Winner (Note: The number in parentheses after each winner's name is the number of Gateway Tour events they had won up to and including that tournament.)
Jun 8	Desert Mountain	Scottsdale, AZ	140,000	(United States) Brian Kontak (1)
Jun 12	Legend Trail & Wildfire	Scottsdale, AZ	140,000	(United States) Charley Hoffman (1)
Jun 20	Troon North & Kierland	Scottsdale, AZ	140,000	(United States) Chris Zambri (1)
Jun 27	Grayhawk	Scottsdale, AZ	140,000	(United States) Michael Walton (1)
Jul 11	Dawson Companies Challenge	Scottsdale, AZ	140,000	(United States) Jimmy Walker (1)
Jul 18	PF Chang's Classic	Chandler, AZ	140,000	(United States) Chris Zambri (2)
Jul 24	Iomega Classic (1st)	Scottsdale, AZ	140,000	(United States) Rob Rashell (1)
Aug 1	Learning 2000 Classic	Phoenix, AZ	140,000	(United States) Ken Tanigawa (1)
Aug 7	Epson Invitational	Scottsdale, AZ	140,000	(United States) Chris Ming (1)
Aug 14	Roth Capital Partners Classic	Phoenix, AZ	140,000	(United States) Mikkel Reece (1)
Aug 29	Microsoft Classic	Scottsdale, AZ	200,000	(United States) Brian Smock (1)
Sep 5	LG Electronics Classic	Scottsdale, AZ	200,000	(United States) David Howser (1)
Sep 12	Iomega Classic (2nd)	Scottsdale, AZ	200,000	(South Korea) Jin Park (1)
Sep 19	Johnson Bank Invitational	Tempe, AZ	200,000	(United States) James Drew (1)
Sep 26	Epson Tour Championship	Scottsdale, AZ	270,000	(United States) David Howser (2)

=== Money list ===
The money list was based on prize money won during the season, calculated in U.S. dollars.

Position	Player	Prize money ($)
1	(United States) David Howser	124,032
2	(United States) Rob Rashell	97,995
3	(United States) Chris Zambri	88,091
4	(United States) Michael Walton	87,262
5	(United States) Charley Hoffman	61,862

== 2003 season ==
The following table lists official events during the 2003 season.

=== Desert Series ===
Date	Tournament	Location	Purse (US$)	Winner
Jun 4	Iomega Classic	Rio Verde, AZ	140,000	(United States) Brian Smock (2)
Jun 11	Glassical Designs Classic	Phoenix, AZ	140,000	(United States) Brian Smock (3)
Jun 19	Troon Classic	Scottsdale, AZ	140,000	(South Africa) Warren Schutte (1)
Jun 26	HDLS Classic	Scottsdale, AZ	140,000	(United States) Bill Lunde (1)
Jul 3	LG Electronics Invitational	Scottsdale, AZ	140,000	(United States) Jason Allen (1)
Jul 18	Johnson Bank Invitational	Scottsdale, AZ	200,000	(United States) Brian Guetz (1)
Jul 24	Intel Invitational	Scottsdale, AZ	140,000	(United States) Michael Flynn (1)
Jul 31	Grayhawk Classic	Scottsdale, AZ	140,000	(United States) Nate Whitson (1)
Aug 7	Microsoft Classic	Scottsdale, AZ	140,000	(United States) Bobby Elliott (1)
Aug 14	Johnson Bank Classic	Scottsdale, AZ	200,000	(United States) Chris Sessler (1)
Aug 28	Epson Invitational	Scottsdale, AZ	140,000	(United States) Brian Guetz (2)
Sep 5	Intel Classic	Scottsdale, AZ	200,000	(United States) Michael Flynn (2)
Sep 10	Drive Headwear Classic	Rio Verde, AZ	140,000	(United States) Greg Bruckner (1)
Sep 18	PF Chang's Classic	Scottsdale, AZ	200,000	(United States) Rob Rashell (2)
Sep 25	Intel Tour Championship	Scottsdale, AZ	367,300	(United States) Brian Smock (4)

=== Beach Series ===
Date	Tournament	Location	Purse (US$)	Winner
May 29	Iomega Classic	Myrtle Beach, SC	50,586	(United States) Steve Gilley (1)
Jun 4	Intel Classic	Myrtle Beach, SC	50,781	(United States) Kevin Gessino-Kraft (1)
Jun 11	Murray Brothers Caddyshack Classic	Myrtle Beach, SC	54,433	(United States) Steve Gilley (2)
Jun 18	LG Electronics Classic	North Myrtle Beach, SC	60,680	(United States) Jeff Page (1)
Jun 26	HLDS Classic	Myrtle Beach, SC	55,326	(United States) Ben Duncan (1)
Jul 10	Epson Classic	North Myrtle Beach, SC	57,110	(United States) Steve Gilley (3)
Jul 17	Johnson Bank Invitational	Cherry Hills, SC	82,065	(United States) Cortney Brisson (1)
Jul 24	Microsoft Classic	North Myrtle Beach, SC	56,218	(United States) Steve Larick (1)
Jul 31	Legends Group Classic	North Myrtle Beach, SC	77,605	(United States) Kevin Gessino-Kraft (2)
Aug 8	Glassical Designs Classic	Calabash, SC	54,433	(United States) Shad Muth (1)
Aug 20	Burroughs & Chapin Classic	Myrtle Beach, SC	54,433	(United States) Ryan Gioffre (1)
Aug 28	Intel Invitational	North Myrtle Beach, SC	58,895	(Canada) Ryan Zylstra (1)
Sep 5	Johnson Bank Classic	Myrtle Beach, SC	77,605	(United States) Ryan Dillon (1)
Sep 12	PF Chang's Classic	North Myrtle Beach, SC	77,605	(United States) Greg Sweatt (1)

=== Money list ===
The money list was based on prize money won during the season, calculated in U.S. dollars.

Position	Player	Prize money ($)
1	(United States) Brian Smock	156,413
2	(United States) Rob Rashell	102,630
3	(United States) Brian Guetz	92,616
4	(United States) Bill Lunde	87,214
5	(United States) Michael Flynn	83,604

== 2004 season ==
The following table lists official events during the 2004 season.

=== Pacific Series ===
Date	Tournament	Location	Purse (US$)	Winner
Jan 7	Pacific Series 1	Corona, CA	84,490	(United States) Charley Hoffman (2)
Jan 15	Pacific Series 2	Hemet, CA	119,048	(United States) Brian Smock (5)
Jan 22	Pacific Series 3	Temecula, CA	88,950	(United States) Steve Holmes (1)
Jan 30	Pacific Series 4	Temecula, CA	118,600	(United States) Chris Zambri (3)
Feb 6	Pacific Series 5	Temecula, CA	83,670	(United States) Chris Kamin (1)
Feb 13	Pacific Series 6	Chula Vista, CA	88,950	(United States) Dustin White (1)
Feb 26	Steele Canyon Classic	Jamul, CA	88,950	(United States) Jeff Gove (1)
Mar 3	Pala Mesa Classic	Fallbrook, CA	88,950	(United States) Jeff Hart (1)
Mar 11	Auld Classic	Chula Vista, CA	127,140	(United States) Jeff Gove (2)
Mar 18	Maderas Irish Open	Poway, CA	92,840	(United States) Charley Hoffman (3)
Mar 24	Cross Creek Classic	Temecula, CA	83,170	(United States) Ben Weir (1)

=== Desert Series ===
Date	Tournament	Location	Purse (US$)	Winner
Jun 4	Desert Series 1	Phoenix, AZ	153,850	(United States) Wil Collins (1)
Jun 11	Desert Series 2	Phoenix, AZ	155,000	(United States) Jerry Smith (1)
Jun 17	Desert Series 3	Rio Verde, AZ	150,400	(United States) Jerry Smith (2)
Jun 24	Desert Series 4	Phoenix, AZ	155,000	(United States) John Douma (1)
Jul 1	Desert Series 5	Scottsdale, AZ	154,500	(United States) Barry Conser (1)
Jul 16	Desert Series 6	Scottsdale, AZ	152,700	(United States) Barry Conser (2)
Jul 23	Desert Series 7	Chandler, AZ	151,750	(United States) David Howser (1)
Jul 30	Desert Series 8	Scottsdale, AZ	153,000	(United States) Mikkel Reese (2)
Aug 6	Desert Series 9	Scottsdale, AZ	153,000	(United States) Jerry Smith (3)
Aug 13	Desert Series 10	Scottsdale, AZ	153,300	(United States) John Douma (2)
Aug 27	Desert Series 11	Scottsdale, AZ	155,000	(United States) Reid Edstrom (1)
Sep 3	Desert Series 12	Chandler, AZ	155,000	(Australia) Kim Felton (1)
Sep 10	Desert Series 13	Chandler, AZ	155,000	(United States) Andrew Medley (1)
Sep 16	Desert Series 14	Rio Verde, AZ	250,000	(United States) Kyle Blackman (1)
Dec 19	Tour Championship	Scottsdale, AZ	500,000	(United States) Chris Kamin (2)

=== Beach Series ===
Date	Tournament	Location	Purse (US$)	Winner
Jun 3	Beach Series 1	Myrtle Beach, SC	64,371	(United States) Conrad Ray (1)
Jun 12	Beach Series 2	Sunset Beach, NC	59,690	(United States) Kevin Gessino-Kraft (3)
Jun 18	Beach Series 3	Sunset Beach, NC	93,040	(United States) David Robinson (1)
Jun 24	Beach Series 4	Pawleys Island, SC	59,690	(United States) Hank Smith (1)
Jul 2	Beach Series 5	Sunset Beach, NC	93,040	(United States) David Robinson (2)
Jul 16	Beach Series 6	Sunset Beach, NC	58,770	(United States) Steve Wheatcroft (1)
Jul 24	Beach Series 7	Calabash, NC	93,040	(United States) Kevin Gessino-Kraft (4)
Jul 30	Beach Series 8	Myrtle Beach, SC	61,720	(United States) Kevin Gessino-Kraft (5)
Aug 6	Beach Series 9	Pawleys Island, SC	59,690	(United States) Steven Jenkins (1)
Aug 13	Beach Series 10	Myrtle Beach, SC	95,040	(United States) Tommy Gainey (1)
Aug 27	Beach Series 11	Sunset Beach, NC	59,690	(United States) Tommy Gainey (2)
Sep 3	Beach Series 12	Myrtle Beach, SC	93,040	(United States) Rick Heath (1)
Sep 10	Beach Series 13	Cherry Grove, SC	53,740	(United States) Kevin Gessino-Kraft (5)
Sep 16	Beach Series 14	Myrtle Beach, SC	89,135	(United States) Kevin Gessino-Kraft (6)

=== Money list ===
The money list was based on prize money won during the season, calculated in U.S. dollars.

Position	Player	Prize money ($)
1	(United States) Jerry Smith	198,423
2	(United States) Chris Kamin	168,237
3	(United States) Mikkel Reese	140,617
4	(United States) Brian Smock	139,221
5	(United States) Kevin Gessino-Kraft	128,687

== 2005 season ==
The following table lists official events during the 2005 season.

=== Desert Series ===
Date	Tournament	Location	Purse (US$)	Winner
Feb 3	Desert Spring 1	Mesa, AZ	114,600	(United States) Chris Sessler (2)
Feb 10	Desert Spring 2	Phoenix, AZ	114,600	(United States) Gibby Martens (1)
Feb 17	Desert Spring 3	Chandler, AZ	120,500	(United States) Brian Kontak (2)
Mar 3	Desert Spring 4	Litchfield Park, AZ	113,100	(United States) John Douma (3)
Mar 10	Desert Spring 5	Chandler, AZ	108,000	(United States) Shaun Haberstroh (1)
Mar 24	Desert Spring 6	Peoria, AZ	110,040	(United States) Gibby Martens (2)
Mar 31	Desert Spring 7	Maricopa, AZ	107,800	(United States) Brian Kontak (3)
Apr 14	Desert Spring 8	Goodyear, AZ	107,280	(United States) Troy Kelly (1)
Apr 21	Desert Spring 9	Mesa, AZ	107,280	(United States) Wil Collins (2)
Apr 28	Desert Spring 10	Scottsdale, AZ	109,020	(United States) Chez Reavie (1)
Jun 3	Desert Summer 1	Scottsdale, AZ	162,000	(United States) Chad Saladin (1)
Jun 10	Desert Summer 2	Rio Verde, AZ	162,000	(United States) Mikkel Reese (3)
Jun 17	Desert Summer 3	Scottsdale, AZ	162,000	(United States) Jesse Mueller (1)
Jul 1	Desert Summer 4	Scottsdale, AZ	162,000	(South Africa) Warren Schutte (2)
Jul 8	Desert Summer 5	Anthem, AZ	162,000	(United States) Ryan Hogue (1)
Jul 15	Desert Summer 6	Scottsdale, AZ	162,000	(United States) Barry Conser (3)
Jul 22	Desert Summer 7	Phoenix, AZ	162,000	(United States) Andy Walker (1)
Aug 5	Desert Summer 8	Scottsdale, AZ	162,000	(United States) Chris Botsford (1)
Aug 12	Desert Summer 9	Chandler, AZ	162,000	(United States) Nigel Spence (1)
Aug 19	Desert Summer 10	Mesa, AZ	162,000	(United States) Parker McLachlin (1)
Sep 2	Desert Summer 11	Scottsdale, AZ	162,000	(United States) Brian Kontak (4)
Sep 9	Desert Summer 12	Scottsdale, AZ	162,000	(United States) Kendall Critchfield (1)
Sep 15	Desert Summer 13	Rio Verde, AZ	162,000	(United States) Ryan Dillon (2)
Sep 22	Desert Summer 14	Mesa, AZ	162,000	(United States) Ryan Dillon (3)
Dec 18	Grey Goose Gateway Tour Championship	Port St. Lucie, FL	600,000	(United States) Randy Leen (2)

=== RTJT Series ===
Date	Tournament	Location	Purse (US$)	Winner
Feb 4	Highland Oaks	Dothan, AL	30,625	(United States) Stephen Woodard (1)
Feb 11	Magnolia Grove	Mobile, AL	31,520	(England) Gary Christian (1)
Feb 18	Cambrian Ridge	Greenville, AL	30,750	(England) Gary Christian (2)
Mar 4	Capital Hill (Legislator)	Prattville, AL	39,425	(England) Gary Christian (3)
Mar 11	Oxmoor Valley	Birmingham, AL	35,925	(United States) Stan Gann (1)
Mar 25	Grand National	Opelika, AL	33,775	(United States) Scott Feaster (1)
Apr 1	Capital Hill (Senator)	Prattville, AL	27,400	(United States) Chip Deason (1)
Apr 8	Hampton Cove	Owens Cross Roads, AL	25,150	(United States) Tommy Gainey (3)
Apr 22	Silver Lakes	Glencoe, AL	26,420	(United States) Blake Adams (1)
Apr 29	The Shoals	Muscle Shoals, AL	22,600	(England) Gary Christian (4)

=== Beach Series ===
Date	Tournament	Location	Purse (US$)	Winner
Jun 3	Beach Series 1	Hobe Sound, FL	179,180	(United States) David Kirkpatrick (1) (United States) Alan Morin (1)
Jun 10	Beach Series 2	Hobe Sound, FL	180,000	(United States) Alan Morin (2)
Jun 17	Beach Series 3	Hobe Sound, FL	178,217	(United States) Reid Edstrom (2)
Jun 24	Beach Series 4	Port St Lucie, FL	178,208	(Australia) Aron Price (1)
Jul 8	Beach Series 5	Stuart, FL	179,181	(Japan) Akio Sadakata (1)
Jul 15	Beach Series 6	Palm Beach Gardens, FL	174,852	(United States) Randy Leen (1)
Jul 22	Beach Series 7	Palm City, FL	177,080	(United States) Brad Klapprott (1)
Aug 4	Beach Series 8	Vero Beach, FL	175,811	(United States) Steve Wheatcroft (2)
Aug 12	Beach Series 9	West Palm Beach, FL	176,060	(United States) Steve Wheatcroft (3)
Aug 19	Beach Series 10	West Palm Beach, FL	175,340	(United States) Brad Klapprott (2)
Aug 26	Beach Series 11	Palm City, FL	176,643	(United States) Reid Edstrom (3) (United States) Daniel Konieczny (1)
Sep 9	Beach Series 12	West Palm Beach, FL	175,782	(Australia) Aron Price (2)
Sep 16	Beach Series 13	Palm Beach Gardens, FL	175,782	(United States) Dave Clodfelter (1)
Sep 23	Beach Series 14	Hobe Sound, FL	174,976	(United States) Pleasant Hughes (1)

== 2006 season ==
The following table lists official events during the 2006 season.

=== Desert Series ===
Date	Tournament	Location	Purse (US$)	Winner
Jan 6	Desert Spring A1	Mesa, AZ	83,141	(United States) Dustin White (2)
Jan 12	Desert Spring A2	Anthem, AZ	87,001	(United States) Brian Kontak (5)
Jan 18	Desert Spring A3	Goodyear, AZ	90,002	(United States) Todd Demsey (1)
Jan 25	Desert Spring A4	Rio Verde, AZ	103,000	(United States) Scott Harrington (1)
Feb 9	Desert Spring A5	Glendale, AZ	110,000	(United States) Shad Muth (2)
Feb 15	Desert Spring A6	Mesa, AZ	86,000	(United States) Bobby Kalinowski (1)
Feb 23	Desert Spring A7	Peoria, AZ	97,000	(United States) Kristoffer Marshall (1)
Mar 2	Desert Spring A8	Litchfield Park, AZ	99,000	(Scotland) Martin Laird (1)
Mar 16	Desert Spring B1	Gilbert, AZ	103,000	(United States) Joe Lanza (1)
Mar 22	Desert Spring B2	Litchfield Park, AZ	92,000	(United States) Troy Kelly (2)
Mar 29	Desert Spring B3	Litchfield Park, AZ	90,865	(Scotland) Martin Laird (2)
Apr 6	Desert Spring B4	Chandler, AZ	110,000	(United States) Kristoffer Marshall (2)
Apr 20	Desert Spring B5	Buckeye, AZ	97,000	(Australia) Craig Spence (1)
Apr 27	Desert Spring B6	Rio Verde, AZ	102,000	(United States) Rob Rashell (3)
May 4	Desert Spring B7	Mesa, AZ	90,000	(United States) Jesse Mueller (2)
May 11	Desert Spring B8	Scottsdale, AZ	87,000	(United States) Chris Sessler (3)
Jun 2	Desert Summer 1	Scottsdale, AZ	99,976	(United States) Andy Walker (2)
Jun 9	Desert Summer 2	Anthem, AZ	97,302	(South Africa) Warren Schutte (3)
Jun 15	Desert Summer 3	Rio Verde, AZ	132,111	(United States) Mikkel Reese (4)
Jun 21	Desert Summer 4	Phoenix, AZ	100,829	(United States) Tommy Medina (1)
Jul 7	Desert Summer 5	Rio Verde, AZ	135,671	(United States) Aaron Watkins (1)
Jul 12	Desert Summer 6	Cave Creek, AZ	101,753	(United States) Bret Guetz (1)
Jul 21	Desert Summer 7	Litchfield Park, AZ	130,924	(United States) Mikkel Reese (5)
Aug 3	Desert Summer 8	Rio Verde, AZ	100,000	(United States) Mikkel Reese (6)
Aug 11	Desert Summer 9	Chandler, AZ	100,000	(United States) Ryan Hogue (2)
Aug 18	Desert Summer 10	Mesa, AZ	100,000	(United States) Jesse Mueller (3)
Sep 1	Harolds Corral Classic	Scottsdale, AZ	100,000	(United States) Brett Paquet (1)
Sep 7	Desert Summer 12	Scottsdale, AZ	100,000	(Canada) Kent Eger (1)
Sep 14	Desert Summer 13	Anthem, AZ	100,000	(United States) Chris Kamin (3)
Sep 20	Desert Summer 14	Rio Verde, AZ	100,000	(United States) Brett Paquet (2)
Oct 1	Sidney Frank Memorial Tour Championship	Scottsdale, AZ	300,000	(United States) Steve Marino (3)

=== Beach Series ===
Date	Tournament	Location	Purse (US$)	Winner
Jan 8	Beach Spring A1	Vero Beach, FL	111,000	(United States) Nick Cook (1)
Jan 13	Beach Spring A2	Palm Beach Gardens, FL	110,000	(United States) Steve Marino (1)
Jan 18	Beach Spring A3	Stuart, FL	110,000	(Canada) David Morland IV (1)
Jan 27	Beach Spring A4	Palm City, FL	109,000	(United States) Colby Beckstrom (1)
Feb 8	Beach Spring A5	Wellington, FL	109,000	(United States) Jeremy Pope (1)
Feb 15	Beach Spring A6	Palm Beach Gardens, FL	109,000	(United States) Justin Hicks (1)
Feb 24	Beach Spring A7	Palm City, FL	109,000	(United States) Brad Klapprott (3)
Mar 8	Beach Spring A8	Wellington, FL	109,000	(United States) Kyle Willman (1)
Mar 22	Beach Spring B1	Port St. Lucie, FL	110,000	(United States) Pleasant Hughes (2)
Mar 31	Beach Spring B2	Palm City, FL	110,000	(United States) Brian Lamberti (1)
Apr 7	Beach Spring B3	Palm Beach Gardens, FL	110,000	(United States) Jess Daley (1)
Apr 12	Beach Spring B4	Port St. Lucie, FL	110,000	(United States) Steve Marino (2)
Apr 21	Beach Spring B5	Palm Beach Gardens, FL	110,000	(United States) Kyle Willman (2)
Apr 28	Beach Spring B6	Palm City, FL	110,000	(England) Matthew Cort (2)
May 5	Beach Spring B7	Palm City, FL	110,000	(United States) Pleasant Hughes (3)
May 10	Beach Spring B8	Port St. Lucie, FL	110,000	(United States) Stephen Conrad (1)
Jun 10	Beach Summer 1	Palm City, FL	168,902	(United States) Jamie Neber (1)
Jun 16	Beach Summer 2	Port St. Lucie, FL	168,902	(United States) Alan Morin (3)
Jun 22	Beach Summer 3	Port St. Lucie, FL	127,566	(United States) Pleasant Hughes (4)
Jun 30	Beach Summer 4	Palm Beach Gardens, FL	171,275	(Argentina) Fabián Gómez (1)
Jul 14	Beach Summer 5	Palm City, FL	171,275	(United States) Jimbo Fuller (1)
Jul 20	Beach Summer 6	Vero Beach, FL	167,715	(United States) Jamie Neber (2)
Jul 27	Beach Summer 7	Palm City, FL	127,566	(United States) Jamie Neber (3)
Aug 3	Beach Summer 8	Lake Worth, FL	128,456	(United States) Jeremy Pope (2)
Aug 10	Beach Summer 9	Palm Beach Gardens, FL	128,456	(United States) Kyle Dobbs (1)
Aug 17	Beach Summer 10	Stuart, FL	124,896	(United States) Del Ponchock (1)
Aug 24	Beach Summer 11	Hobe Sound, FL	124,006	(Norway) Morten Orveland (1)
~~Sep 7~~	Beach Summer 12	Palm City, FL	–	Canceled
Sep 15	Beach Summer 13	Stuart, FL	170,088	(United States) Justin Hicks (2)
Sep 22	Beach Summer 14	West Palm Beach, FL	166,528	(United States) Jamie Neber (4)

== 2007 season ==
The following table lists official events during the 2007 season.

=== Desert Series ===
Date	Tournament	Location	Purse (US$)	Winner
Jan 11	Desert Winter 1	Anthem, AZ	84,000	(United States) Dustin White (3)
Jan 18	Desert Winter 2	Rio Verde, AZ	84,000	(Canada) Andrew Parr (1)
Jan 24	Desert Winter 3	Mesa, AZ	84,000	(United States) Chris Kamin (4)
Feb 1	Desert Winter 4	Peoria, AZ	84,000	(United States) Kevin Streelman (1)
Feb 15	Desert Winter 5	Gilbert, AZ	84,000	(United States) Andres Gonzales (1)
Feb 21	Desert Winter 6	Litchfield Park, AZ	84,000	(United States) Ben Kern (1)
Mar 1	Desert Winter 7	Phoenix, AZ	84,000	(South Africa) Warren Schutte (4)
Mar 22	Desert Spring 1	Rio Verde, AZ	84,000	(Canada) Kent Eger (2)
Mar 29	Desert Spring 2	Chandler, AZ	84,000	(United States) Brian Kontak (6)
Apr 5	Desert Spring 3	Glendale, AZ	84,000	(United States) Brian Kontak (7)
Apr 12	Desert Spring 4	Litchfield Park, AZ	84,000	(South Korea) Jin Park (2)
Apr 26	Desert Spring 5	Goodyear, AZ	84,000	(United States) Todd Tanner (1)
May 3	Desert Spring 6	Buckeye, AZ	84,000	(United States) Brad Jacobson (1)
May 10	Desert Spring 7	Sun City West, AZ	84,000	(United States) Jesse Mueller (4)
May 26	Spring Series Championship	Scottsdale, AZ	180,000	(United States) Brian Kontak (8)
Jun 7	Desert Summer 1	Scottsdale, AZ	95,931	(United States) John Douma (4)
Jun 15	Desert Summer 2	Rio Verde, AZ	127,908	(United States) James Drew (2)
Jun 20	Desert Summer 3	Cave Creek, AZ	100,776	(United States) Andy Walker (3)
Jun 28	Desert Summer 4	Scottsdale, AZ	122,740	(United States) Kevin Streelman (2)
Jul 13	Desert Summer 5	Buckeye, AZ	94,962	(United States) Brian Vranesh (1)
Jul 19	Desert Summer 6	Chandler, AZ	92,055	(United States) Jacob Rogers (1)
Jul 27	Desert Summer 7	Sun City West, AZ	92,055	(United States) Charlie Beljan (1)
Aug 2	Desert Summer 8	Rio Verde, AZ	122,740	(United States) Benoit Beisser (1)
Aug 17	Desert Summer 9	Mesa, AZ	104,652	(United States) Charlie Beljan (2)
Aug 24	Desert Summer 10	Chandler, AZ	130,492	(United States) Kevin Streelman (3)
Aug 31	Desert Summer 11	Rio Verde, AZ	100,000	(United States) Matt Ballard (1)
Sep 7	Desert Summer 12	Phoenix, AZ	100,000	(Canada) Kent Eger (3)
Oct 13	Gateway Tour Championship	Norwalk, IA	400,000	(United States) Ryan Dillon (4)

=== Beach Series ===
Date	Tournament	Location	Purse (US$)	Winner
Jan 7	Beach Winter 1	Vero Beach, FL	84,000	(United States) Jeremy Pope (3)
Jan 11	Beach Winter 2	Stuart, FL	84,000	(United States) Justin Hicks (3)
Jan 17	Beach Winter 3	Palm City, FL	84,000	(United States) Kyle Dobbs (2)
Jan 26	Beach Winter 4	Palm City, FL	84,000	(United States) Tim Turpen (1)
Feb 7	Beach Winter 5	Royal Palm Beach, FL	84,000	(United States) Andy Bare (1)
Feb 16	Beach Winter 6	Palm City, FL	84,000	(United States) Jeremy Pope (4)
Feb 28	Beach Winter 7	Wellington, FL	84,000	(United States) Colby Beckstrom (2)
Mar 10	Winter Series Championship	Palm City, FL	200,000	(United States) David Lebeck (1)
Mar 21	Beach Spring 1	Port St. Lucie, FL	84,000	(United States) Chad Couch (1)
Mar 27	Beach Spring 2	Palm City, FL	84,000	(United States) Brian Lamberti (2)
Apr 11	Beach Spring 3	Port St. Lucie, FL	84,000	(United States) Jeremy Pope (5)
Apr 18	Beach Spring 4	Palm City, FL	84,000	(United States) Tom Gillis (1)
Apr 27	Beach Spring 5	Palm City, FL	84,000	(United States) Vince Covello (1)
May 4	Beach Spring 6	Palm City, FL	84,000	(United States) Gibby Gilbert III (1)
May 9	Beach Spring 7	Port St. Lucie, FL	84,000	(United States) Ted Brown (1)
Jun 9	Beach Summer 1	Palm City, FL	60,000	(United States) Jamie Neher (1)
Jun 15	Beach Summer 2	Stuart, FL	60,000	(United States) Jeff Freeman (1)
Jun 22	Beach Summer 3	Palm Beach Gardens, FL	60,000	(United States) Brad Klaprott (4)
Jun 28	Beach Summer 4	Palm City, FL	60,000	(Argentina) Clodomiro Carranza (1)
Jul 13	Beach Summer 5	Palm Beach Gardens, FL	60,000	
Jul 20	Beach Summer 6	Palm Beach Gardens, FL	60,000	(United States) Jeremy Pope (6)
Jul 26	Beach Summer 7	Stuart, FL	60,000	(United States) Tom Gillis (2)
Aug 2	Beach Summer 8	Port St. Lucie, FL	60,000	(United States) Kyle Dobbs (3)
Aug 9	Beach Summer 9	Palm Beach Gardens, FL	60,000	(United States) Jeremy Pope (7)
Aug 16	Beach Summer 10	Palm City, FL	–	Canceled
Aug 22	Beach Summer 11	Palm Beach Gardens, FL	60,000	(United States) Kyle Dobbs (4)
Sep 6	Beach Summer 12	West Palm Beach, FL	60,000	(United States) Michael Adamson (1)

=== Money list ===
The money list was based on prize money won during the season, calculated in U.S. dollars.

Position	Player	Prize money ($)
1	(United States) Ryan Dillon	134,132

== 2008 season ==
The following table lists official events during the 2008 season.

=== Desert Series ===
Date	Tournament	Location	Purse (US$)	Winner
Jan 10	Desert Winter 1	Buckeye, AZ	128,000	(Sweden) Niklas Lemke (1)
Jan 17	Desert Winter 2	Peoria, AZ	126,000	(United States) Ben Kern (2)
Jan 23	Desert Winter 3	Mesa, AZ	129,000	(United States) Benoit Beisser (2)
Feb 7	Desert Winter 4	Litchfield Park, AZ	132,000	(United States) Brian Kontak (9)
Feb 13	Desert Winter 5	Litchfield Park, AZ	138,000	(United States) Joe Lanza (2)
Feb 21	Desert Winter 6	Glendale, AZ	138,000	(United States) Kane Hanson (1)
Feb 28	Desert Winter 7	Rio Verde, AZ	151,000	(United States) Jesse Mueller (5)
Mar 9	Winter Series Championship	Queen Creek, AZ	200,950	(United States) Ben Kern (3)
Mar 21	Desert Spring 1	Gilbert, AZ	151,000	(United States) Jesse Mueller (6)
Mar 28	Desert Spring 2	Sun City West, AZ	141,000	(United States) Michael Derminio (1)
Apr 4	Desert Spring 3	Litchfield Park, AZ	156,000	(United States) Brian Vranesh (2)
Apr 10	Desert Spring 4	Phoenix, AZ	149,000	(United States) Brian Guetz (3)
Apr 25	Desert Spring 5	Chandler, AZ	149,000	(Canada) Kent Eger (4)
May 2	Desert Spring 6	Queen Creek, AZ	140,000	(United States) Rob Rashell (4)
May 9	Desert Spring 7	Goodyear, AZ	134,000	(Mexico) Carlos Corona (1)
Jun 6	Desert Summer 1	Scottsdale, AZ	107,000	(United States) Benoit Beisser (3)
Jun 13	Desert Summer 2	Scottsdale, AZ	109,500	(United States) Jesse Mueller (7)
Jun 20	Desert Summer 3	Anthem, AZ	103,000	(Australia) Steven Jones (1)
Jun 27	Desert Summer 4	Peoria, AZ	102,000	(United States) Nate Lashley (1)
Jul 11	Desert Summer 5	Scottsdale, AZ	103,000	(United States) Brian Vranesh (3)
Jul 18	Desert Summer 6	Scottsdale, AZ	100,000	(United States) Chris Sessler (4)
Aug 2	Desert Summer 7	Litchfield Park, AZ	99,000	(United States) Benoit Beisser (4)
Aug 8	Desert Summer 8	Peoria, AZ	94,000	(United States) Charlie Beljan (3)
Aug 22	Desert Summer 9	Mesa, AZ	94,000	(United States) Trevor Murphy (3)
Aug 29	Desert Summer 10	Cave Creek, AZ	100,000	(United States) Jesse Mueller (8)
Sep 5	Desert Summer 11	Rio Verde, AZ	100,000	(United States) Chris Sessler (5)
Sep 12	Desert Summer 12	Chandler, AZ	100,000	(Australia) Jake Younan-Wise (1)
Oct 4	Tour Championship	Norwalk, IA	397,570	(United States) Clint Jensen (1)

=== Beach Series ===
Date	Tournament	Location	Purse (US$)	Winner
Jan 9	Beach Winter 1	Royal Palm Beach, FL	95,000	(United States) Justin Hicks (4)
Jan 16	Beach Winter 2	Palm City, FL	96,000	(United States) Kyle Dobbs (5)
Jan 23	Beach Winter 3	Stuart, FL	95,000	(United States) Brandon Knaub (1)
Feb 8	Beach Winter 4	Palm City, FL	101,000	(Argentina) Hernán Rey (1)
Feb 15	Beach Winter 5	Palm City, FL	107,000	(United States) Jeremy Pope (8)
Feb 22	Beach Winter 6	Port St. Lucie, FL	95,000	(United States) Jeremy Pope (9)
Feb 28	Beach Winter 7	Wellington, FL	92,000	(United States) Jamie Neher (2)
Mar 21	Beach Spring 1	Palm City, FL	61,840	(United States) Justin Peters (1)
Mar 28	Beach Spring 2	Palm City, FL	57,000	(United States) Brandon Knaub (2)
Apr 4	Beach Spring 3	Stuart, FL	60,000	(United States) David Ladd (1)
Apr 11	Beach Spring 4	Wellington, FL	54,000	(United States) Bobby Collins (1)
Apr 25	Beach Spring 5	Palm City, FL	53,000	(United States) Jamie Neher (3)
May 2	Beach Spring 6	Jensen Beach, FL	51,000	(United States) David Ladd (2)
May 9	Beach Spring 7	Lake Worth, FL	51,000	(United States) Jess Daley (2)
May 24	Spring Series Championship	Port St. Lucie, FL	197,830	(United States) Rob Rashell (5)
Jun 6	Beach Summer 1	Jensen Beach, FL	75,500	(United States) Lee Stroever (1)
Jun 13	Beach Summer 2	Stuart, FL	80,500	(United States) Colby Beckstrom (4)
Jun 20	Beach Summer 3	West Palm Beach, FL	76,000	(United States) Jess Daley (3)
Jun 27	Beach Summer 4	Palm City, FL	69,200	(United States) Jeremy Pope (10)
Jul 11	Beach Summer 5	Royal Palm Beach, FL	76,950	(United States) Lee Stroever (2)
Jul 18	Beach Summer 6	Jupiter, FL	81,000	(United States) Danny Ellis (1)
Aug 1	Beach Summer 7	Port St. Lucie, FL	71,000	(United States) Leif Olson (1)
Aug 8	Beach Summer 8	Lake Worth, FL	71,000	(United States) Ryan Cobb (1)
Aug 22	Beach Summer 9	Palm Beach Gardens, FL	74,000	(United States) Vince Covello (2)
Aug 29	Beach Summer 10	Port St. Lucie, FL	78,000	(United States) Del Ponchock (2)
Sep 5	Beach Summer 11	Stuart, FL	80,000	(United States) Colby Beckstrom (5)
Sep 12	Beach Summer 12	Vero Beach, FL	76,000	(United States) Steve Wheatcroft (4)

=== DFW Series ===
Date	Tournament	Location	Purse (US$)	Winner
May 30	DFW Series 1	Fort Worth, TX	70,000	(United States) Colby Beckstrom (3)
Jun 6	DFW Series 2	Desoto, TX	60,000	(United States) Edward Loar (2)
Jun 13	DFW Series 3	Arlington, TX	60,000	
Jun 20	DFW Series 4	Fort Worth, TX	60,000	(United States) Scott Sikes (1)
Jun 27	DFW Series 5	Euless, TX	50,000	(United States) David Schultz (1)
Jul 11	DFW Series 6	Keller, TX	60,000	(United States) Adam Meyer (1)
Jul 26	Mid Summer Championship	Fort Worth, TX	300,000	(United States) Edward Loar (3)
Aug 1	DFW Series 7	Trophy Club, TX	57,000	(United States) Edward Loar (4)
Aug 8	DFW Series 8	Flower Mound, TX	57,000	(United States) Brock Mulder (1)
Aug 22	DFW Series 9	Lewisville, TX	63,000	(United States) Edward Loar (5)
Aug 29	DFW Series 10	Dallas, TX	60,000	(United States) Jaxon Brigman (1)
Sep 5	DFW Series 11	Plano, TX	57,000	(United States) Jonathan James (1)
Sep 12	DFW Series 12	Carrollton, TX	56,000	(United States) Brad Weesner (1)

=== Money list ===
The money list was based on prize money won during the season, calculated in U.S. dollars.

Position	Player	Prize money ($)
1	(United States) Jesse Mueller	171,168
