= Steve Pate =

American professional golfer (born 1961)

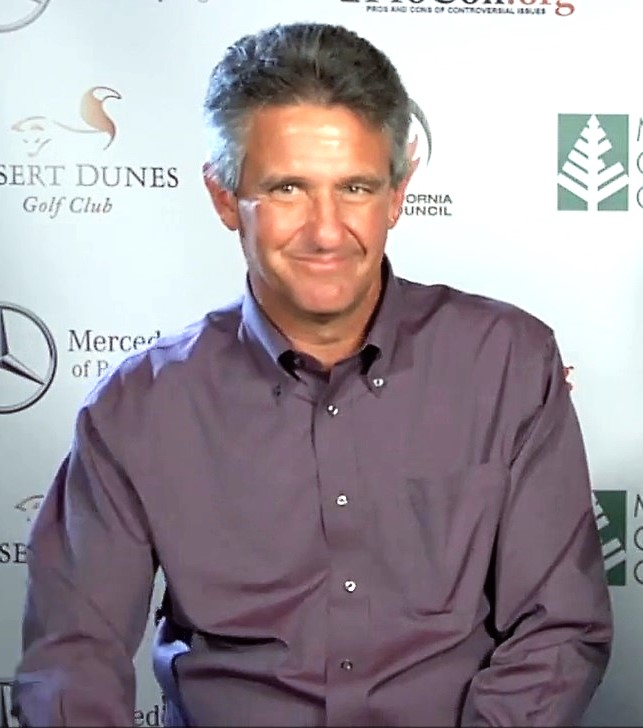
- Pate in 2013

Personal information
- Full name: Stephen Robert Pate
- Nickname: Volcano
- Nationality: United States
- Born: May 26, 1961 (age 65) Ventura, California, U.S.
- Height: 6 ft 0 in (1.83 m)
- Weight: 200 lb (91 kg; 14 st)
- Spouse: Sheri
- Children: 2

Career
- Sport: Golf
- College: UCLA
- Turned professional: 1983
- Current tour: Champions Tour
- Former tours: PGA Tour; Nationwide Tour
- Professional wins: 8
- Highest ranking: 18 (February 23, 1992)

Number of wins by tour
- PGA Tour: 6
- Korn Ferry Tour: 1

Best results in major championships
- Masters Tournament: T3: 1991
- PGA Championship: T7: 1991
- U.S. Open: T3: 1988
- The Open Championship: 4th: 1992

Achievements and awards
- PGA Tour Comeback Player of the Year: 1999

Stephen Robert Pate (born May 26, 1961) is an American professional golfer who has played on both the PGA Tour, the Nationwide Tour and Champions Tour.

== Career ==
Pate was born in Ventura, California. He attended UCLA and was a member of the golf team; one teammate was Corey Pavin, who joined Pate on the PGA Tour. Pate helped lead the team to the 1983 Pac-10 Championship, and earned All-American honors that year. He turned pro and joined the PGA Tour later that year.

Pate has won six PGA Tour events. His first victory was at the 1987 Southwest Golf Classic; and his most recent win was at the 1998 CVS Charity Classic. His best years in professional golf were 1988 when he won twice and finished 12th on the money list; and 1991, when he had five top-3 finishes including a win at the Honda Classic, earned $727,997 and finished 6th on the money list. His best finish in a major is a T-3 at both the 1988 U.S. Open and the 1991 Masters. Pate has had more than 70 top-10 finishes in PGA Tour events. He has featured in the top-50 of the Official World Golf Ranking.

Pate's golf career is riddled by injuries. At the height of his career, playing some of the best golf on the PGA Tour, he was in a three vehicle pile up at the 1991 Ryder Cup and mainly cheered his teammates on from the sidelines. In 1996, he was in a nearly fatal car accident, where he shattered his wrist. Pate was not sure he would ever compete again at the highest level. He did return to the PGA Tour and in 1999, he finished T-4 in the Masters, setting the record, which holds today, of seven consecutive birdies in his third round (later to be tied by Tiger Woods). Finishing 13th on the 1999 money list, Pate was named the PGA Tour's Comeback Player of the Year.

Pate was a member of two winning Ryder Cup teams, 1991 and 1999. As he entered his 40s, he began to split his playing time between the PGA Tour and the Nationwide Tour. He has one victory on the Nationwide Tour, the 2010 Pacific Rubiales Bogotá Open, which he won at age 48. It was his first professional win since 1998.

Pate made his Champions Tour debut on May 26, 2011, his 50th birthday, in the Senior PGA Championship.

Pate lives in Westlake Village, California. He acquired the nickname "Volcano" due to his eruptions on the golf course. In 2006, Pate teamed with Damian Pascuzzo completing numerous golf course design projects, including a recent remodel of La Costa.

== Professional wins (8) ==
=== PGA Tour wins (6) ===
No.	Date	Tournament	Winning score	Margin of victory	Runner(s)-up
1	Sep 27, 1987	Southwest Golf Classic	−15 (67-71-68-67=273)	1 stroke	(United States) Mark O'Meara, (United States) Bob Eastwood, (Canada) Dan Halldorson, (United States) David Edwards
2	Jan 17, 1988	MONY Tournament of Champions	−14 (66-66-70=202)*	1 stroke	(United States) Larry Nelson
3	Feb 21, 1988	Shearson Lehman Hutton Andy Williams Open	−19 (68-66-67-68=269)	1 stroke	(United States) Jay Haas
4	Mar 10, 1991	Honda Classic	−9 (69-65-70-75=279)	3 strokes	(United States) Paul Azinger, (Canada) Dan Halldorson
5	Feb 23, 1992	Buick Invitational of California (2)	−16 (64-69-67=200)*	1 stroke	(United States) Chip Beck
6	Jul 26, 1998	CVS Charity Classic	−15 (70-65-67-67=269)	1 stroke	(Australia) Bradley Hughes, (United States) Scott Hoch

*Note: Tournament shortened to 54 holes due to rain.

PGA Tour playoff record (0–3)

No.	Year	Tournament	Opponent	Result
1	1985	Georgia-Pacific Atlanta Golf Classic	(United States) Wayne Levi	Lost to birdie on second extra hole
2	1991	BellSouth Atlanta Golf Classic	(United States) Corey Pavin	Lost to par on second extra hole
3	1999	GTE Byron Nelson Classic	(United States) Loren Roberts	Lost to par on first extra hole

=== Nationwide Tour wins (1) ===
No.	Date	Tournament	Winning score	Margin of victory	Runner-up
1	Mar 7, 2010	Pacific Rubiales Bogotá Open	−11 (70-66-66-71=273)	Playoff	(United States) Aaron Watkins

Nationwide Tour playoff record (1–0)

No.	Year	Tournament	Opponent	Result
1	2010	Pacific Rubiales Bogotá Open	(United States) Aaron Watkins	Won with par on second extra hole

=== Other wins (1) ===
No.	Date	Tournament	Winning score	Margin of victory	Runners-up
1	Dec 6, 1998	JCPenney Classic (with (United States) Meg Mallon)	−29 (61-66-66-62=255)	4 strokes	(Australia) Rachel Hetherington and (United States) Rocco Mediate

Other playoff record (0–1)

No.	Year	Tournament	Opponent	Result
1	1989	Isuzu Kapalua International	(United States) Peter Jacobsen	Lost to birdie on third extra hole

== Playoff record ==
PGA of Japan Tour playoff record (0–1)

No.	Year	Tournament	Opponent	Result
1	1990	The Crowns	(Japan) Noboru Sugai	Lost to par on first extra hole

== Results in major championships ==
Tournament	1986	1987	1988	1989
Masters Tournament			T36	T26
U.S. Open		T24	T3	T51
The Open Championship			CUT	T13
PGA Championship	T53	T61	T62	T41

Tournament	1990	1991	1992	1993	1994	1995	1996	1997	1998	1999
Masters Tournament		T3	T6	CUT						T4
U.S. Open	T33	T49	CUT	T19	T21	CUT			T32	T34
The Open Championship	T8	T64	4	CUT						T45
PGA Championship	T31	T7	T48	70		T58			CUT	T8

Tournament	2000	2001	2002
Masters Tournament	T49		
U.S. Open	CUT		CUT
The Open Championship	T20		
PGA Championship	T41	75	

Top 10
Did not play

CUT = missed the half-way cut
"T" = tied

=== Summary ===
Tournament	Wins	2nd	3rd	Top-5	Top-10	Top-25	Events	Cuts made
Masters Tournament	0	0	1	2	3	3	7	6
U.S. Open	0	0	1	1	1	4	13	9
The Open Championship	0	0	0	1	2	4	8	6
PGA Championship	0	0	0	0	2	2	13	12
Totals	0	0	2	4	8	13	41	33

- Most consecutive cuts made – 13 (1988 PGA – 1992 Masters)
- Longest streak of top-10s – 2 (1992 PGA – 1992 Masters)

== Results in The Players Championship ==
Tournament	1986	1987	1988	1989
The Players Championship	T72	CUT	57	T34

Tournament	1990	1991	1992	1993	1994	1995	1996	1997	1998	1999
The Players Championship	T11	T27	T40	CUT	CUT	CUT			T42	T58

Tournament	2000	2001
The Players Championship	T27	T58

Did not play

CUT = missed the halfway cut
"T" indicates a tie for a place.

== Results in World Golf Championships ==
Tournament	1999	2000	2001
Match Play	4	R64	R64
Championship	T46		NT^{1}
Invitational	T12	37	

^{1}Cancelled due to 9/11

Top 10
Did not play

QF, R16, R32, R64 = Round in which player lost in match play
"T" = Tied
NT = No tournament

== U.S. national team appearances ==
- Kirin Cup: 1988 (winners)
- Dunhill Cup: 1991
- Ryder Cup: 1991, 1999

== See also ==
- 1984 PGA Tour Qualifying School graduates
- 2003 PGA Tour Qualifying School graduates
- List of golfers with most PGA Tour wins
