= Randy Leen =

American golfer (born 1975)

Randy Leen (born December 22, 1975) is an American former professional golfer.

== High school and college career ==
Leen was born in Dayton, Ohio. He graduated from Archbishop Alter High School in Kettering, Ohio. He was a three time All-American and three time Big Ten Conference player of the year for the Indiana Hoosiers.

== Amateur career ==
Leen was the low amateur at the 1996 U.S. Open, beating out Tiger Woods by three shots. He played on the 1997 Walker Cup team.

== Professional career ==
Leen turned professional in 1998. He played on the Buy.com Tour in 2000. After many years on the mini-tours, he played on the Nationwide Tour in 2008, but did not earn enough money to keep his card. In 2011, he joined the Dayton Amateur Golf Hall of Fame.

== Professional wins (4) ==
=== Golden Bear Tour wins (3) ===
No.	Date	Tournament	Winning score	Margin of victory	Runner-up
1	Jan 7, 2004	Waterford Crystal Classic	−6 (67-68-75=210)	1 stroke	(United States) Tim Cantwell

=== Gateway Tour wins (3) ===
No.	Date	Tournament	Winning score	Margin of victory	Runner-up
1	Jul 15, 2005	Beach Series 6	−22 (67-64-65-70=266)	4 strokes	(United States) Jeremy Hope
2	Dec 18, 2005	Grey Goose Gateway Tour Championship	−13 (67-71-70-67=275)	1 stroke	(United States) Ron Whittaker
3	Mar 27, 2009	Beach Spring 2	+3 (72-73-74=219)	2 strokes	(United States) Clint Jensen

== U.S. national team appearances ==
Amateur

- Walker Cup: 1997 (winners)
