= 2008 PGA Tour Qualifying School graduates =

This is a list of the 28 players who earned their 2009 PGA Tour card through Q School in 2008.

Place	Player	PGA Tour starts	Cuts made	Notes
1	(United States) Harrison Frazar	300	177	Shot a 59 in the fourth round; 1 Nationwide Tour win
T2	(Australia) James Nitties	0	0	1 Von Nida Tour win
T2	(United States) Derek Fathauer	2	1	Played on 2008 Palmer Cup team
T4	(United States) Chris Stroud	55	22	Played on 2004 Palmer Cup team
T4	(United States) John Huston	533	351	7 PGA Tour wins
6	(United States) Robert Garrigus	86	51	
T7	(United States) David Berganio Jr.	136	64	3 Nationwide Tour wins
T7	(United States) Webb Simpson	7	3	Played on 2007 Walker Cup and Palmer Cup teams
T7	(United States) James Oh	0	0	1 Nationwide Tour win
T7	(United States) Glen Day	409	246	1 PGA Tour win
T11	(United States) Notah Begay III	184	93	4 PGA Tour wins
T11	(United States) Matt Borchert	0	0	
T11	(United States) Gary Woodland	0	0	
T11	(United States) Jason Dufner	79	38	2 Nationwide Tour wins
T11	(United States) Troy Kelly	1	0	
T11	(United States) Jimmy Walker	60	26	3 Nationwide Tour wins
T11	(United States) Tyler Aldridge	0	0	
T18	(United States) Wil Collins	3	1	
T18	(United States) Leif Olson	1	0	
T18	(United States) Brian Vranesh	0	0	
T18	(United States) Chris Riley	254	163	1 PGA Tour win
T18	(United States) Ted Purdy	191	105	1 PGA Tour win
T18	(Sweden) Mathias Grönberg	158	76	4 European Tour wins
T18	(South Korea) Yang Yong-eun	43	25	1 European Tour win, 4 Japan Golf Tour wins
T18	(United States) Aaron Watkins	1	0	
T18	(United States) Kent Jones	290	144	2 Nationwide Tour wins
T18	(United States) Bob Heintz	132	46	2 Nationwide Tour wins
T18	(United States) Jay Williamson	325	166	

- Players in yellow are 2009 PGA Tour rookies.

== 2009 Results ==
Player	Starts	Cuts made	Best finish	Money list rank	Earnings ($)
(United States) Harrison Frazar	27	19	T7	112	738,615
(Australia) James Nitties*	26	15	T4	96	931,532
(United States) Derek Fathauer*	24	8	T22	203	125,305
(United States) Chris Stroud	28	17	T6	113	735,019
(United States) John Huston	13	7	T19	199	135,476
(United States) Robert Garrigus	25	17	T9	127	657,204
(United States) David Berganio Jr.	15	7	T32	205	115,517
(United States) Webb Simpson*	30	16	T5	70	1,249,674
(United States) James Oh*	20	4	T39	220	57,271
(United States) Glen Day	26	14	T13 (twice)	151	445,720
(United States) Notah Begay III	14	4	T28	223	54,645
(United States) Matt Borchert*	18	4	65	234	34,324
(United States) Gary Woodland*	17	8	T28	204	121,031
(United States) Jason Dufner	26	19	T2	33	2,190,792
(United States) Troy Kelly*	16	3	T51	238	25,828
(United States) Jimmy Walker	24	14	T5	125	662,683
(United States) Tyler Aldridge*	17	3	T66 (twice)	239	24,370
(United States) Wil Collins*	18	5	T26	207	84,569
(United States) Leif Olson*	21	5	T3	154	412,966
(United States) Brian Vranesh*	20	6	T8	189	198,567
(United States) Chris Riley	22	16	T7	129	630,417
(United States) Ted Purdy	30	21	T5	100	838,707
(Sweden) Mathias Grönberg	13	6	6	162	354,163
(South Korea) Yang Yong-eun	23	19	Win (twice)	10	3,489,516
(United States) Aaron Watkins*	18	6	T7	178	263,969
(United States) Kent Jones	24	12	T9	171	301,879
(United States) Bob Heintz	20	11	T8	169	312,699
(United States) Jay Williamson	22	14	T13	184	240,574

*PGA Tour rookie in 2009
T = Tied
Green background indicates the player retained his PGA Tour card for 2010 (finished inside the top 125).
Yellow background indicates the player did not retain his PGA Tour card for 2010, but retained conditional status (finished between 126-150).
Red background indicates the player did not retain his PGA Tour card for 2010 (finished outside the top 150).

== Winners on the PGA Tour in 2009 ==
No.	Date	Player	Tournament	Winning score	Margin of victory	Runner-up
1	Mar 8	(South Korea) Yang Yong-eun	Honda Classic	−9 (68-65-70-68=271)	1 stroke	(United States) John Rollins
2	Aug 16	(South Korea) Yang Yong-eun (2)	PGA Championship	−8 (73-70-67-70=280)	3 strokes	(United States) Tiger Woods

== Runner-up on the PGA Tour in 2009 ==
No.	Date	Player	Tournament	Winner	Winning score	Runner-up score
1	Sep 7	(United States) Jason Dufner	Deutsche Bank Championship	(United States) Steve Stricker	−17 (63-72-65-67=267)	−16 (66-69-68-65=268)

== See also ==
- 2008 Nationwide Tour graduates
