= Seaforth Country Classic =

The Seaforth Country Classic is a golf tournament on the Canadian Tour. Since the tournament's founding in 2008, it has been played at the Seaforth Golf Club in Seaforth, Ontario.

== Winners ==
Seaforth Country Classic

- 2011 (United States) Brian Unk

The Economical Insurance Group Seaforth Country Classic

- 2010 (Canada) Kent Eger

Seaforth Country Classic

- 2009 (United States) Brian Unk
- 2008 (Canada) Kent Eger
