= Jin Park =

South Korean golfer

Personal information
- Nationality: South Korea
- Born: 12 October 1979 (age 47) Seoul, South Korea
- Height: 5 ft 8 in (1.73 m)
- Weight: 160 lb (73 kg; 11 st)

Career
- Sport: Golf
- College: Arizona State University
- Turned professional: 2001
- Former tours: PGA Tour; Asian Tour; Web.com Tour; Gateway Tour
- Professional wins: 3

Jin Park (born 12 October 1979) is a South Korean professional golfer.

== Early life and amateur career ==
Park was born in Seoul, South Korea. He attended Arizona State University where he earned a degree in political science.

== Professional career ==
In 2001, Park turned professional. He has competed on the PGA Tour, Web.com Tour, and Asian Tour. He played on the PGA Tour in 2008 and 2013 after successfully completing qualifying school. His best finish was T18 at the 2008 John Deere Classic. He has played on the Web.com Tour since 2006 with his best finish T2 at the 2010 Melwood Prince George's County Open. He has had a total of 11 top-10 finishes on the Web.com Tour during his career. His best finish on the Asian Tour was 4th at the 2007 Barclays Singapore Open.

== Professional wins (3) ==
=== Gateway Tour wins (2) ===
| No. | Date | Tournament | Winning score | To par | Margin of victory | Runner-up |
|---|---|---|---|---|---|---|
| 1 | 12 Sep 2002 | Iomega Classic (2nd) | 70-69-66-67=272 | −16 | 1 stroke | (United States) Rob Rashell |
| 2 | 12 Apr 2007 | Desert Spring 4 | 200 | −16 | Playoff | (United States) Ben Kern |

=== Other wins (1) ===
- 2003 Northern California PGA Championship

== See also ==
- 2007 PGA Tour Qualifying School graduates
- 2012 PGA Tour Qualifying School graduates
