= Ahmad Bateman =

Canadian-American golfer (born 1961)

Personal information
- Full name: Ahmad Daniel Bateman
- Nationality: Canada; United States
- Born: August 6, 1961 (age 65) Windsor, Ontario, Canada
- Height: 6 ft 0 in (1.83 m)
- Weight: 160 lb (73 kg; 11 st)
- Children: Aneesah, Adam

Career
- Sport: Golf
- College: University of Southern California
- Turned professional: 1982
- Former tours: Asian Tour; Nationwide Tour
- Professional wins: 1

Number of wins by tour
- Korn Ferry Tour: 1

Best results in major championships
- Masters Tournament: DNP
- PGA Championship: CUT: 1996
- U.S. Open: DNP
- The Open Championship: DNP

Ahmad Daniel Bateman (born August 6, 1961) is a Canadian-American professional golfer.

== Professional career ==
Bateman played on the Nationwide Tour from 1996 to 2005, winning the Nike Carolina Classic in 1997. He also played on the Asian Tour from 1994 to 2006.

== Professional wins (1) ==
=== Buy.com Tour wins (1) ===
No.	Date	Tournament	Winning score	Margin of victory	Runners-up
1	May 11, 1997	Nike Carolina Classic	−4 (70-69-75-70=284)	1 stroke	(United States) Steve Flesch, (United States) Dennis Paulson, (Australia) Terry Price

Buy.com Tour playoff record (0–1)

No.	Year	Tournament	Opponent	Result
1	2000	Buy.com Omaha Classic	(United States) David Berganio Jr.	Lost to par on second extra hole
