= Aaron Watkins (golfer) =

American professional golfer

Personal information
- Nationality: United States
- Born: July 24, 1982 (age 44) Winter Park, Florida, U.S.
- Height: 5 ft 8 in (1.73 m)
- Weight: 170 lb (77 kg; 12 st)

Career
- Sport: Golf
- College: Kansas State University
- Turned professional: 2004
- Former tours: PGA Tour; Web.com Tour; Gateway Tour
- Professional wins: 2

Best results in major championships
- Masters Tournament: DNP
- PGA Championship: DNP
- U.S. Open: T15: 2012
- The Open Championship: DNP

Aaron Watkins (born July 24, 1982) is an American professional golfer who has played on the PGA Tour and the Nationwide Tour.

== Early life and amateur career ==
Watkins was born in Winter Park, Florida. He played college golf at Kansas State University,

== Professional career ==
In 2004, Watkins turned professional. Watkins spent two years playing on the Gateway Tour where he recorded one win, in 2006. He has since played on the Nationwide Tour in 2007 and 2010–12. His best finish was a playoff loss to Steve Pate at the 2010 Pacific Rubiales Bogota Open.

In 2009, Watkins played on the PGA Tour having come through all three rounds of qualifying school. His best finish was tie for 7th at the Zurich Classic of New Orleans, but made only six cuts and lost his card at the end of the year.

Watkins qualified for the 2012 U. S. Open and finished in a tie for 15th.

== Personal life ==
In 2011, Watkins' wife, Jessica, gave birth to a daughter, Ady.

== Professional wins (2) ==
=== Gateway Tour wins (1) ===
No.	Date	Tournament	Winning score	Margin of victory	Runners-up
1	Jul 7, 2006	Desert Summer 5	−13 (67-66-69-72=274)	6 strokes	(Mexico) Óscar Fraustro, (United States) Mikkel Reese

=== Other wins (1) ===
- 2004 Southern Arizona Open

== Playoff record ==
Nationwide Tour playoff record (0–1)

No.	Year	Tournament	Opponent	Result
1	2010	Pacific Rubiales Bogotá Open	(United States) Steve Pate	Lost to par on second extra hole

== Results in major championships ==
Tournament	2012
U.S. Open	T15

"T" = tied
Note: Watkins only played in the U.S. Open.

== See also ==
- 2008 PGA Tour Qualifying School graduates
- 2012 PGA Tour Qualifying School graduates
