= Bubba Dickerson =

American professional golfer (born 1981)

Personal information
- Full name: Benjamin Gordon Dickerson
- Nickname: Bubba
- Nationality: United States
- Born: May 6, 1981 (age 45) Jacksonville, Florida, U.S.
- Height: 6 ft 0 in (1.83 m)
- Weight: 190 lb (86 kg; 14 st)

Career
- Sport: Golf
- College: University of Florida
- Turned professional: 2002
- Former tours: PGA Tour; Web.com Tour; NGA Hooters Tour
- Professional wins: 2

Number of wins by tour
- Korn Ferry Tour: 1
- Other: 1

Best results in major championships
- Masters Tournament: CUT: 2002
- PGA Championship: DNP
- U.S. Open: CUT: 2011
- The Open Championship: DNP

Benjamin Gordon "Bubba" Dickerson (born May 6, 1981) is an American professional golfer who played on the PGA Tour and Web.com Tour. He is best known for winning the 2001 U.S. Amateur.

== Early life ==
Dickerson was born in Jacksonville, Florida. His nickname "Bubba" derives from his older brother Robert, who could not pronounce the word "brother" as a young child.

== Amateur career ==
Dickerson accepted an athletic scholarship to attend the University of Florida in Gainesville, Florida, where he played for coach Buddy Alexander's Florida Gators men's golf team in National Collegiate Athletic Association (NCAA) competition in 2000 and 2001. Dickerson was runner-up in the 2000 U.S. Amateur Public Links championship. In 2001, he was a member of the Florida Gators team that won the NCAA Championship, and followed that with a win at the Western Amateur. Dickerson received second-team All-Southeastern Conference (SEC) honors in 2000 and first-team All-SEC honors in 2001, and was a first-team All-American in 2001.

In the U.S. Amateur that fall, Dickerson made the finals against Robert Hamilton. In the 36-hole final match, Dickerson was down five holes through fourteen played but won the last four holes of the morning round to pull within one. The afternoon round was very close, and Dickerson won the final two holes to go from one down to a one-up victory.

The winner of the U.S. Amateur gains entry into the following year's Masters, U.S. Open, and British Open, so long as he remains an amateur.

== Professional career ==
Dickerson played in the Masters, but after the tournament, he decided to leave school and turn professional, giving up the chance to play in the other two majors.

Dickerson played on the European Challenge Tour in 2003, the NGA Hooters Tour in 2004, and the Nationwide Tour in 2005, 2008–2019. In 2006 and 2007, he qualified for the PGA Tour. He picked up his first professional win at the Chitimacha Louisiana Open in 2009 on the Nationwide Tour with a one hole playoff victory over Brian Vranesh.

== Awards and honors ==
- In 2000, Dickerson received second-team All-Southeastern Conference (SEC) honors
- In 2001, Dickerson earned first-team All-SEC honors and was a first-team All-American

== Amateur wins ==
- 1997 Junior PGA Championship
- 2001 Western Amateur, U.S. Amateur

== Professional wins (2) ==
=== Nationwide Tour wins (1) ===
No.	Date	Tournament	Winning score	Margin of victory	Runner-up
1	Mar 29, 2009	Chitimacha Louisiana Open	−10 (71-64-69-71=274)	Playoff	(United States) Brian Vranesh

Nationwide Tour playoff record (1–0)

No.	Year	Tournament	Opponent	Result
1	2009	Chitimacha Louisiana Open	(United States) Brian Vranesh	Won with birdie on first extra hole

=== NGA Hooters Tour wins (1) ===
No.	Date	Tournament	Winning score	Margin of victory	Runner-up
1	Mar 21, 2004	Michelob Ultra Classic	−24 (65-66-68-65=264)	3 strokes	(United States) Todd Bailey

== Results in major championships ==
Tournament	2002	2003	2004	2005	2006	2007	2008	2009	2010	2011
Masters Tournament	CUT									
U.S. Open										CUT

Did not play

CUT = missed the half-way cut
Note: Dickerson never played in The Open Championship or the PGA Championship.

== See also ==
- 2005 PGA Tour Qualifying School graduates
- List of Florida Gators men's golfers on the PGA Tour
