= Greater Dallas Open =

Golf tournament in Texas

Tournament information
- Location: Lewisville, Texas
- Established: 2015
- Course: The Lakes at Castle Hills
- Par: 72
- Length: 7,135 yards (6,524 m)
- Tour: Web.com Tour
- Format: Stroke play
- Prize fund: US$500,000
- Month played: June
- Final year: 2015

Tournament record score
- Aggregate: 265 Tyler Aldridge (2015)
- To par: −23 as above

Final champion
- (United States) Tyler Aldridge
- Location in the United States Location in Texas

The Greater Dallas Open was a golf tournament on the Web.com Tour. It was played in June 2015 at The Lakes at Castle Hills in Lewisville, Texas, a city in the Dallas–Fort Worth metroplex.

== Winners ==
Year	Winner	Score	To par	Margin of victory	Runners-up
2015	(United States) Tyler Aldridge	265	−23	2 strokes	(Brazil) Lucas Lee (United States) Greg Yates
