= Leif Olsson (footballer) =

Swedish footballer

Personal information
- Date of birth: 11 November 1968 (age 57)
- Place of birth: Degerfors, Sweden
- Height: 1.87 m (6 ft 2 in)
- Position: Midfielder

Senior career*
Years	Team	Apps	(Gls)
1986–1989	Degerfors IF		
1990–1991	AIK		
1993–1997	Degerfors IF		
1997–1998	Belenenses		
1998	Degerfors IF		
1999–2002	KB Karlskoga FF		
- * Club domestic league appearances and goals

Leif Olsson (born 11 November 1968) is a Swedish former professional footballer who played as a midfielder.
