= Leif Olson =

American professional golfer (born 1981)

Personal information
- Nationality: United States
- Born: July 17, 1981 (age 45) Denver, Colorado, U.S.
- Height: 6 ft 2 in (1.88 m)
- Weight: 200 lb (91 kg; 14 st)

Career
- Sport: Golf
- College: Duke University
- Turned professional: 2004
- Former tours: PGA Tour; Gateway Tour
- Professional wins: 1

Best results in major championships
- Masters Tournament: DNP
- PGA Championship: DNP
- U.S. Open: CUT: 2004
- The Open Championship: DNP

Leif Olson (born July 17, 1981) is an American professional golfer who played on the PGA Tour.

== Early life and amateur career ==
In 1981, Olson was born in Denver, Colorado. He played college golf from 1999 to 2003 at Duke University.

== Professional career ==
In 2004, Olson turned pro. He earned his 2009 PGA Tour card through 2008 Q-School. In his first 14 events on tour, Olson only made three cuts. Olson won a BMW Z4 Roadster at the 2009 RBC Canadian Open when he recorded a hole in one on the 15th hole at Glen Abbey Golf Course. It was a very bizarre hole in one. Olson's ball landed past the hole, rolled down the slope towards the hole and deflected off another player's ball which redirected it into the cup.

Olson finished a career-best third place at the Turning Stone Resort Championship in 2009, just one stroke out of a playoff that was won by Matt Kuchar.

== Professional wins (1) ==
=== Gateway Tour wins (1) ===
No.	Date	Tournament	Winning score	Margin of victory	Runner-up
1	Aug 1, 2008	Beach Summer 7	−12 (65-69-70=204)	1 stroke	(United States) Bobby Collins

== Results in major championships ==
Tournament	2004
U.S. Open	CUT

CUT = missed the half-way cut
Note: Olson only played in the U.S. Open.

== See also ==
- 2008 PGA Tour Qualifying School graduates
