= Gateway Tour =

Professional golf tour

- Sport: Golf
- Founded: 2001
- Founder: Chris Stutts
- First season: 2002
- Folded: 2017
- Countries: United States
- Region: Based in Alabama, Arizona, California, Florida and Texas
- Related competitions: Golden Bear Tour

The Gateway Tour was a third-level men's professional golf tour headquartered in Phoenix, Arizona that ran series of tournaments in Arizona, California, Florida, Alabama and Texas.

== History ==
The tour was founded as the Gateway Pro Tour in 2001 by former Arizona State All-American golfer Chris Stutts, with sponsorship from Gateway, Inc.. The tour was modelled on the Golden Bear Tour, based in West Palm Beach, Florida, which Stutts had competed on, winning 4 tournaments and leading the money list in 1997. Its aim was to help players to win a place on the Nationwide/Web.com Tour, or jump directly to the PGA Tour. The tour's board of advisers included Phil Mickelson and Tom Lehman.

The first season in 2002 had 14 tournaments, all in Arizona, and paid out US$2,400,000 in prize money, primarily funded by the players' entry fees. Regular tournaments were 54-hole events, with four series championships played over 72 holes, and a 72-hole Tour Championship for the top players in all four series. In 2003, a "Beach Series" was created, based in Myrtle Beach, South Carolina, with the Arizona events becoming known as the "Desert Series". A "Pacific Series" was held in 2004, based in San Diego, California. The Beach Series proved less popular than the Desert Series, and after two seasons, it was decided to relocate it to Florida. In March 2005, in order to avoid being in direct competition, the Golden Bear Tour merged with the Gateway Tour. Also in 2005, a "Robert Trent Jones Trail" series was held, which was played on Robert Trent Jones courses in Alabama. In 2008 and 2009, a "DFW Series" was held, based in the Dallas–Fort Worth area in Texas. The leading players in each series qualified to play in the Tour Championship.

In 2013, operations were merged with the All-American Tour, and the tour became known as the All-American Gateway Tour. There were subsequent joint-ventures with the NGA Pro Golf Tour (the NGA Gateway Tour) and the eGolf Professional Tour (the eGolf Gateway Tour). For sponsorship reasons, at different times, the tour was titled as the Grey Goose Gateway Tour (2004–2007) and the OnCore Gateway Tour (2015–2017). Tour alumni include Sean O'Hair, Notah Begay III, J. B. Holmes, Steve Marino, Kevin Stadler, and Bubba Watson.

== Money list winners ==
Year	Winner	Prize money (US$)
2013	(United States) Nathan Tyler	92,675
2012	(United States) Benoit Beisser	53,775
2011	(United States) James Drew	70,375
2010	(United States) Eric Meierdierks	71,793
2009	(United States) Charlie Beljan	159,180
2008	(United States) Jesse Mueller	171,168
2007	(United States) Ryan Dillon	134,132
2006		
2005		
2004	(United States) Jerry Smith	198,423
2003	(United States) Brian Smock	156,412
2002	(United States) David Howser	124,032
