= Albertsons Boise Open =

Professional golf tournament in the United States

Coordinates: 43.586°N 116.239°W

Tournament information
- Location: Boise, Idaho
- Established: 1990
- Course: Hillcrest Country Club
- Par: 71
- Length: 6,726 yards (6,150 m)
- Tour: Korn Ferry Tour
- Format: Stroke play
- Prize fund: $1,000,000
- Month played: August

Tournament record score
- Aggregate: 256 Martin Piller (2015); 256 Chan Kim (2023)
- To par: −28 as above

Current champion
- (United States) Ross Steelman

Location map
- Location in the United States Location in Idaho

The Albertsons Boise Open is a professional golf tournament in Idaho on the Korn Ferry Tour, played annually at Hillcrest Country Club in Boise. Held in mid-September for its first 23 years, the new September playoff schedule of the Web.com Tour in 2013 moved the Boise event up to late July. The event returned to mid-September in 2016, and became part of the Web.com Tour Finals as the penultimate event. The schedule was revised for 2019 and it moved to late August.

== History ==
The tournament has been played every year since 1990, the first year of the tour, then known as the Ben Hogan Tour. It is one of four original tournaments on the current schedule. Future notable names in the top 20 that first year were Tom Lehman, John Daly, Jeff Maggert, and Stephen Ames; David Toms made the cut.

Golf has been played on the site since the 1920s, originally named Idaho Country Club. Established in 1940, Hillcrest Country Club has been the only home of the tournament since its inception. The Boise Open was a 54-hole tournament for its first six years, a fourth round was added in 1996.

This stop in southwestern Idaho consistently offers one of the top purses on the Korn Ferry Tour; it was $1.5 million in 2023, with a winner's share of $270,000. The first purse in 1990 was $100,000, with a winner's share of $20,000; the first six-figure winner's share went to Tim Clark in 2000.

The 2003 event featured 13-year-old Michelle Wie, the youngest ever to play on the tour; she carded 78-76 and missed the cut by twelve strokes.

Chris Tidland shot 264 (−20) to win by four strokes in 2008; Fran Quinn shot 270 (−14) in 2009 with a birdie on the final hole to edge third round leader Blake Adams by a single stroke. Hunter Haas shot 263 (−21) in 2010 to win by one stroke over Daniel Summerhays.

At the 2015 edition, retired Army Corporal Chad Pfeifer became the first veteran amputee to play on the Web.com Tour, but missed the cut. He lost his left leg in a 2007 explosion and earned entry through a sponsor exemption.

Albertsons, a major supermarket retailer in the western U.S., has been the title sponsor since 2002. The grocery chain was founded 87 years ago by Joe Albertson in 1939 in Boise, and the company was headquartered in the city until 2006, when it was acquired by Supervalu of Eden Prairie, Minnesota. The company has committed to sponsorship of the tournament through 2016.

== Course layout ==
Course in 2014

| Hole | 1 | 2 | 3 | 4 | 5 | 6 | 7 | 8 | 9 | Out | 10 | 11 | 12 | 13 | 14 | 15 | 16 | 17 | 18 | In | Total |
|---|---|---|---|---|---|---|---|---|---|---|---|---|---|---|---|---|---|---|---|---|---|
| Yards | 409 | 523 | 561 | 182 | 418 | 414 | 392 | 176 | 407 | 3,482 | 359 | 462 | 408 | 216 | 438 | 293 | 535 | 134 | 399 | 3,244 | 6,726 |
| Par | 4 | 5 | 5 | 3 | 4 | 4 | 4 | 3 | 4 | 36 | 4 | 4 | 4 | 3 | 4 | 4 | 5 | 3 | 4 | 35 | 71 |

- The nines are switched for the members, who play the original nine holes (north) first.
- The elevation at the clubhouse is approximately 2,800 feet (855 m) above sea level.

== Winners ==
| Korn Ferry Tour (Current Finals system) | 2023–2024 |
| Korn Ferry Tour (Old Finals system) | 2016–2019, 2021–2022 |
| Korn Ferry Tour (Championship Series) | 2020 |
| Korn Ferry Tour (Regular) | 1990–2015, 2025– |

| # | Year | Winner | Score | To par | Margin of victory | Runner(s)-up |
Albertsons Boise Open
| 37th | 2026 | (United States) Ross Steelman | 257 | −27 | 3 strokes | (United States) Robby Shelton (United States) Davis Shore |
| 36th | 2025 | (Mexico) Emilio González | 262 | −22 | 1 stroke | (United States) Jeffrey Kang |
| 35th | 2024 | (United States) Matt McCarty | 263 | −21 | 2 strokes | (United States) William Mouw (United States) Kevin Roy |
| 34th | 2023 | (United States) **Chan Kim** | 256 | −28 | 2 strokes | (United States) David Kocher |
| 33rd | 2022 | (United States) Will Gordon | 263 | −21 | Playoff | (South Africa) M. J. Daffue (United States) Philip Knowles |
| 32nd | 2021 | (United States) Greyson Sigg | 265 | −19 | 1 stroke | (England) Aaron Rai (United States) J. J. Spaun |
| 31st | 2020 | (Germany) **Stephan Jäger** | 262 | −22 | 2 strokes | (United States) Dan McCarthy (United States) **Brandon Wu** |
| 30th | 2019 | (United States) Matthew NeSmith | 265 | −19 | 1 stroke | (United States) Brandon Hagy (Norway) Viktor Hovland |
| 29th | 2018 | (South Korea) Bae Sang-moon | 265 | −19 | 1 stroke | (United States) Anders Albertson (United States) Adam Schenk (Canada) Roger Sloan |
| 28th | 2017 | (United States) Chesson Hadley | 268 | −16 | 1 stroke | (United States) Ted Potter Jr. (United States) Jonathan Randolph |
| 27th | 2016 | (United States) Michael Thompson | 261 | −23 | 3 strokes | (Argentina) Miguel Ángel Carballo |
| 26th | 2015 | (United States) **Martin Piller** | 256 | −28 | 6 strokes | (Argentina) Jorge Fernández-Valdés |
| 25th | 2014 | (United States) **Steve Wheatcroft** | 260 | −24 | Playoff | (New Zealand) **Steven Alker** |
| 24th | 2013 | (United States) **Kevin Tway** | 261 | −23 | Playoff | (United States) Spencer Levin |
| 23rd | 2012 | (United States) **Luke Guthrie** | 262 | −22 | 4 strokes | (Australia) **Scott Gardiner** (United States) Richard H. Lee (United States) Michael Putnam (United States) Steve Wheatcroft |
| 22nd | 2011 | (United States) **Jason Kokrak** | 266 | −18 | 2 strokes | (United States) **John Mallinger** |
| 21st | 2010 | (United States) **Hunter Haas** | 263 | −21 | 1 stroke | (United States) **Daniel Summerhays** |
| 20th | 2009 | (United States) **Fran Quinn** | 270 | −14 | 1 stroke | (United States) **Blake Adams** |
| 19th | 2008 | (United States) Chris Tidland | 264 | −20 | 4 strokes | (United States) **Scott Piercy** |
| 18th | 2007 | (Canada) **Jon Mills** | 263 | −21 | 1 stroke | (United States) D. A. Points |
| 17th | 2006 | (United States) **Kevin Stadler** | 264 | −20 | 1 stroke | (United States) Glen Day |
| 16th | 2005 | (Australia) **Greg Chalmers** | 269 | −15 | Playoff | (United States) Danny Ellis |
| 15th | 2004 | (United States) Scott Gump | 270 | −14 | 2 strokes | (New Zealand) **Michael Long** (United States) **Jimmy Walker** |
| 14th | 2003 | (United States) Roger Tambellini | 267 | −17 | 6 strokes | (United States) **Tripp Isenhour** (United States) Charles Warren |
| 13th | 2002 | (United States) **Jason Gore** | 273 | −11 | 2 strokes | (United States) Emlyn Aubrey (United States) Barry Cheesman |
Buy.com Boise Open
| 12th | 2001 | (New Zealand) **Michael Long** | 270 | −14 | 1 stroke | (South Africa) Tjaart van der Walt |
| 11th | 2000 | (South Africa) **Tim Clark** | 269 | −15 | 6 strokes | (United States) Patrick Burke (United States) Steve Haskins |
Nike Boise Open
| 10th | 1999 | (United States) **Carl Paulson** | 266 | −18 | 4 strokes | (United States) **Joel Edwards** (United States) Michael Muehr |
| 9th | 1998 | (United States) **Mike Sposa** | 265 | −19 | 2 strokes | (United States) **Notah Begay III** (United States) **Dennis Paulson** |
| 8th | 1997 | (Malaysia) Iain Steel | 267 | −17 | 3 strokes | (United States) Carl Paulson |
| 7th | 1996 | (United States) Matt Gogel | 270 | −14 | 1 stroke | (United States) **David Berganio Jr.** (United States) **Stewart Cink** (United States) **Brett Quigley** |
| 6th | 1995 | (United States) Frank Lickliter | 200 | −13 | 1 stroke | (United States) Kevin Burton (United States) Craig Kanada |
| 5th | 1994 | (United States) Keith Fergus | 198 | −15 | Playoff | (United States) Bill Murchison |
| 4th | 1993 | (United States) **Tommy Moore** | 199 | −14 | 3 strokes | (United States) **Olin Browne** |
Ben Hogan Boise Open
| 3rd | 1992 | (United States) **Jaime Gomez** | 202 | −11 | 1 stroke | (United States) Sean Murphy |
| 2nd | 1991 | (United States) Russell Beiersdorf | 202 | −11 | Playoff | (United States) Rich Parker |
| 1st | 1990 | (United States) Ricky Smallridge | 199 | −14 | 3 strokes | (United States) David Hobby (United States) Robert Thompson (United States) Greg Whisman |

Bolded golfers graduated to the PGA Tour via the Korn Ferry Tour regular-season money list, in years that the event was not part of the old Korn Ferry Tour Finals system. In years that the event was part of that system, all winners and runners-up earned PGA Tour cards.
