= Mathew Goggin =

Australian professional golfer (born 1974)

Personal information
- Full name: Mathew Charles Goggin
- Nationality: Australia
- Born: 13 June 1974 (age 52) Hobart, Tasmania, Australia
- Height: 6 ft 0 in (1.83 m)
- Weight: 185 lb (84 kg; 13.2 st)
- Spouses: Felicity Nowicky (m. 2000; div. 2020) Sarah McCloy (m. 2024)
- Children: 2

Career
- Sport: Golf
- Turned professional: 1995
- Former tours: PGA Tour; European Tour; PGA Tour of Australasia; Web.com Tour; Challenge Tour
- Professional wins: 10
- Highest ranking: 48 (19 July 2009)

Number of wins by tour
- PGA Tour of Australasia: 1
- Korn Ferry Tour: 5 (Tied-7th all-time)
- Challenge Tour: 2
- Other: 2

Best results in major championships
- Masters Tournament: CUT: 2009
- PGA Championship: CUT: 2008, 2009
- U.S. Open: T21: 2013
- The Open Championship: T5: 2009

Mathew Charles Goggin (born 13 June 1974) is an Australian professional golfer.

== Early life ==
In 1974, Goggin was born in Hobart, Tasmania, Australia. His mother is Australian golfer, Lindy Goggin. His father, Charlie Goggin, now largely retired, had a career as a leading Tasmanian horse trainer. Mathew's sister, Luella Meaburn, has worked with her father as a horse trainer.

Mathew's uncles on his father's side, Bill Goggin and Matt Goggin are former Australian rules football players who both played for the Geelong Football Club.

== Amateur career ==
As an amateur, he won the 1995 Australian Amateur, played at Huntingdale Golf Club in Melbourne, 2 & 1 over American Jamie Crow. He also won the 1995 Tasmanian Amateur, played at Seabrook Golf Club in Wynyard, Tasmania, over fellow Peter Toogood.

== Professional career ==
In 1995, Goggin turned professional. He originally played in Europe. He was a member of the Challenge Tour in 1996 and played on the Challenge Tour and the European Tour in 1997. He was also a member of the European Tour in 1998. He also played on the PGA Tour of Australasia.

Goggin was previously a member of the PGA Tour from 2000 to 2003 and regained his card in 2006. He was a member of the Nationwide Tour in 1999, 2004, and 2005. His best PGA Tour year-end money list finish was in 2008 when he finished in 40th.

Goggin was on the PGA Tour until 2010, when he lost his Tour card after finishing 159th. He went back to the Nationwide Tour for 2011. He won the first tournament of the season, the Panama Claro Championship.

== Personal life ==
Goggin is divorced from Felicity with whom he has two children with, Ava Goggin and Atticus Goggin.

He married his partner, Sarah, on Christmas Eve 2024 aboard the MR2 MONA Roma ferry in Hobart.

== Amateur wins ==
- 1995 Australian Amateur, Tasmanian Amateur

== Professional wins (10) ==
=== PGA Tour of Australasia wins (1) ===
Legend
Tour Championships (1)
Other PGA Tour of Australasia (0)

No.	Date	Tournament	Winning score	Margin of victory	Runner-up
1	8 Mar 1998	ANZ Tour Championship	−10 (66-68-71-73=278)	Playoff	(Australia) Brad King

PGA Tour of Australasia playoff record (1–1)

No.	Year	Tournament	Opponent	Result
1	1998	ANZ Tour Championship	(Australia) Brad King	Won with birdie on first extra hole
2	2008	Australian Open	(South Africa) Tim Clark	Lost to par on first extra hole

=== Web.com Tour wins (5) ===
No.	Date	Tournament	Winning score	Margin of victory	Runner(s)-up
1	27 Jun 1999	Nike Lehigh Valley Open	−18 (67-65-66-72=270)	2 strokes	(United States) Matt Gogel
2	8 Aug 1999	Nike Omaha Classic	−24 (66-67-66-65=264)	4 strokes	(United States) Casey Martin
3	27 Feb 2011	Panama Claro Championship	−11 (68-66-67-68=269)	2 strokes	(Australia) Alistair Presnell, (United States) Darron Stiles
4	19 Jun 2011	Preferred Health Systems Wichita Open	−18 (66-65-66-69=266)	1 stroke	(United States) Kyle Thompson
5	1 Feb 2015	Panama Claro Championship (2)	−11 (67-65-70-67=269)	4 strokes	(United States) Harold Varner III

Web.com Tour playoff record (0–1)

No.	Year	Tournament	Opponents	Result
1	2004	Scholarship America Showdown	(United States) Kevin Stadler, (United States) Kyle Thompson, (United States) Chris Tidland	Stadler won with birdie on third extra hole Thompson eliminated by par on second hole Goggin eliminated by par on first hole

=== Challenge Tour wins (2) ===
No.	Date	Tournament	Winning score	Margin of victory	Runner-up
1	25 Aug 1996	Dutch Challenge	−14 (68-69-69-68=274)	2 strokes	(Belgium) Nicolas Vanhootegem
2	11 Oct 1997	San Paolo Vita Open	−19 (68-70-67-64=269)	1 stroke	(Sweden) Henrik Nyström

=== Other wins (1) ===
- 1994 Tasmanian Open (as an amateur)

=== PGA of Australia Legends Tour wins (1) ===
- 2025 NSW Senior Open

== Results in major championships ==
Tournament	2003	2004	2005	2006	2007	2008	2009	2010	2011	2012	2013
Masters Tournament							CUT				
U.S. Open				CUT	T36	CUT					T21
The Open Championship	T46	CUT		CUT			T5	CUT			
PGA Championship						CUT	CUT				

Top 10
Did not play

CUT = missed the half-way cut
"T" = tied

== Results in The Players Championship ==
Tournament	2001	2002	2003	2004	2005	2006	2007	2008	2009	2010
The Players Championship	T70						T12	CUT	CUT	CUT

Did not play

CUT = missed the halfway cut
"T" indicates a tie for a place

== Results in World Golf Championships ==
Tournament	2009
Match Play	R32
Championship	
Invitational	T22
Champions	

Did not play

QF, R16, R32, R64 = Round in which player lost in match play
"T" = Tied

== Team appearances ==
Amateur

- Nomura Cup (representing Australia): 1995
- Australian Men's Interstate Teams Matches (representing Tasmania): 1993, 1994, 1995

== See also ==
- 1999 Nike Tour graduates
- 2002 PGA Tour Qualifying School graduates
- 2005 Nationwide Tour graduates
- 2011 Nationwide Tour graduates
- List of golfers with most Web.com Tour wins
