= Wichita Open =

Golf tournament

Blue Cross and Blue Shield of Kansas Wichita Open

Tournament information
- Location: Wichita, Kansas
- Established: 1990
- Course: Crestview Country Club
- Par: 70
- Length: 7,065 yards (6,460 m)
- Tours: Korn Ferry Tour; PGA Tour Americas
- Format: Stroke play
- Prize fund: US$225,000
- Month played: June

Tournament record score
- Aggregate: 254 Norman Xiong (2022)
- To par: −26 as above

Current champion
- (United States) Dawson Armstrong

Location map
- Location in the United States Location in Kansas

The Wichita Open is a golf tournament on the PGA Tour Americas played annually at the Crestview Country Club in Wichita, Kansas, U.S. It was an event on the Korn Ferry Tour from its inaugural season in 1990 through 2025 and switched to the PGA Tour Americas for 2026.

== Winners ==
Year	Tour (Note: BHT/BUY/KFT/NIK/NWT/WEB − Korn Ferry Tour (including previous tour names); PGATAM − PGA Tour Americas.)	Winner	Score	To par	Margin of victory	Runner(s)-up
Blue Cross and Blue Shield of Kansas Wichita Open
2026	PGATAM	(United States) Dawson Armstrong	268	−12	Playoff	(England) Harry Lord (United States) Corey Pereira
2025	KFT	(Canada) Myles Creighton	263	−17	1 stroke	(Mexico) Emilio González
2024	KFT	(United States) Taylor Dickson	261	−19	1 stroke	(United States) William Mouw (United States) Sam Stevens
2023	KFT	(United States) Ricky Castillo	261	−19	Playoff	(Belgium) Adrien Dumont de Chassart (United States) Kyle Jones
Wichita Open
2022	KFT	(United States) Norman Xiong	254	−26	5 strokes	(United States) Kevin Roy
2021	KFT	(England) Harry Hall	260	−20	1 stroke	(United States) Curtis Thompson
2020	KFT	(United States) Jared Wolfe	264	−16	1 stroke	(Canada) Taylor Pendrith
2019	KFT	(Sweden) Henrik Norlander	265	−15	Playoff	(United States) Bryan Bigley (Denmark) Sebastian Cappelen (United States) Erik Compton (United States) Kevin Dougherty
2018	WEB	(United States) Brady Schnell	266	−14	Playoff	(United States) Brandon Hagy (United States) Scott Pinckney
Air Capital Classic
2017	WEB	(United States) Aaron Wise	259	−21	5 strokes	(United States) Beau Hossler
2016	WEB	(United States) Ollie Schniederjans	263	−17	Playoff	(United States) Collin Morikawa (a) (United States) J. J. Spaun
2015	WEB	(United States) Rob Oppenheim	267	−13	1 stroke	(United States) Andy Winings
2014	WEB	(Denmark) Sebastian Cappelen	262	−18	1 stroke	(United States) Matt Weibring
2013	WEB	(United States) Scott Parel	266	−18	3 strokes	(United States) Alex Aragon
Preferred Health Systems Wichita Open
2012	WEB	(United States) Casey Wittenberg	266	−18	2 strokes	(United States) Jim Herman (United States) Justin Hicks
2011	NWT	(Australia) Mathew Goggin	266	−18	1 stroke	(United States) Kyle Thompson
2010	NWT	(Venezuela) Jhonattan Vegas	264	−20	1 stroke	(United States) Roberto Castro
2009	NWT	(United States) Chris Tidland	268	−16	1 stroke	(United States) Chad Collins (United States) Dave Schultz
2008	NWT	(United States) Scott Piercy	262	−22	2 strokes	(United States) Hunter Haas (United States) Spencer Levin (United States) Daniel Summerhays
2007	NWT	(United States) Brad Elder (2)	265	−19	4 strokes	(Argentina) Fabián Gómez
2006	NWT	(United States) Kevin Johnson	266	−18	1 stroke	(United States) Matt Kuchar
2005	NWT	(United States) Joe Daley	268	−16	Playoff	(United States) Shane Bertsch
2004	NWT	(Australia) Bradley Hughes	270	−14	Playoff	(United States) Erik Compton (United States) Hunter Haas (United States) Scott Harrington
2003	NWT	(United States) Jeff Klauk	265	−19	1 stroke	(United States) Mike Brisky (Australia) Mark Hensby
2002	BUY	(United States) Tyler Williamson	272	−8	1 stroke	(United States) Keoke Cotner (United States) Jeff Klauk
Buy.com Wichita Open
2001	BUY	(United States) Jason Dufner	266	−22	3 strokes	(United States) David Gossett (United States) Jeff Gove (United States) Todd Rose
2000	BUY	(United States) Ben Crane	263	−25	3 strokes	(United States) Kelly Grunewald (United States) Vance Veazey
Nike Wichita Open
1999	NIK	(United States) Brad Elder	268	−20	2 strokes	(United States) Mark Wurtz
1998	NIK	(United States) Emlyn Aubrey	265	−23	1 stroke	(United States) Carl Paulson (United States) Anthony Rodriguez
1997	NIK	(United States) Ben Bates	269	−19	Playoff	(United States) Jeff Brehaut (United States) Carl Paulson (United States) Chris Smith
1996	NIK	(United States) Rick Cramer	269	−19	1 stroke	(United States) J. P. Hayes (United States) Jimmy Johnston (United States) Craig Kanada
1995	NIK	(United States) David Toms	269	−19	Playoff	(United States) E. J. Pfister
1994	NIK	(United States) Dennis Postlewait	271	−17	1 stroke	(United States) Clark Burroughs
1993	NIK	(United States) David Duval	271	−17	1 stroke	(United States) Jeff Lee (United States) John Morse
Ben Hogan Wichita Charity Classic
1992	BHT	(Australia) Jeff Woodland	204	−12	Playoff	(United States) Bob May
1991	BHT	(United States) Eric Hoos	199	−17	1 stroke	(United States) Tom Garner (United States) Pete Jordan
Ben Hogan Reflection Ridge
1990	BHT	(United States) Tom Lehman	202	−14	1 stroke	(United States) Greg Whisman
