= Boo Weekley =

American professional golfer (born 1973)

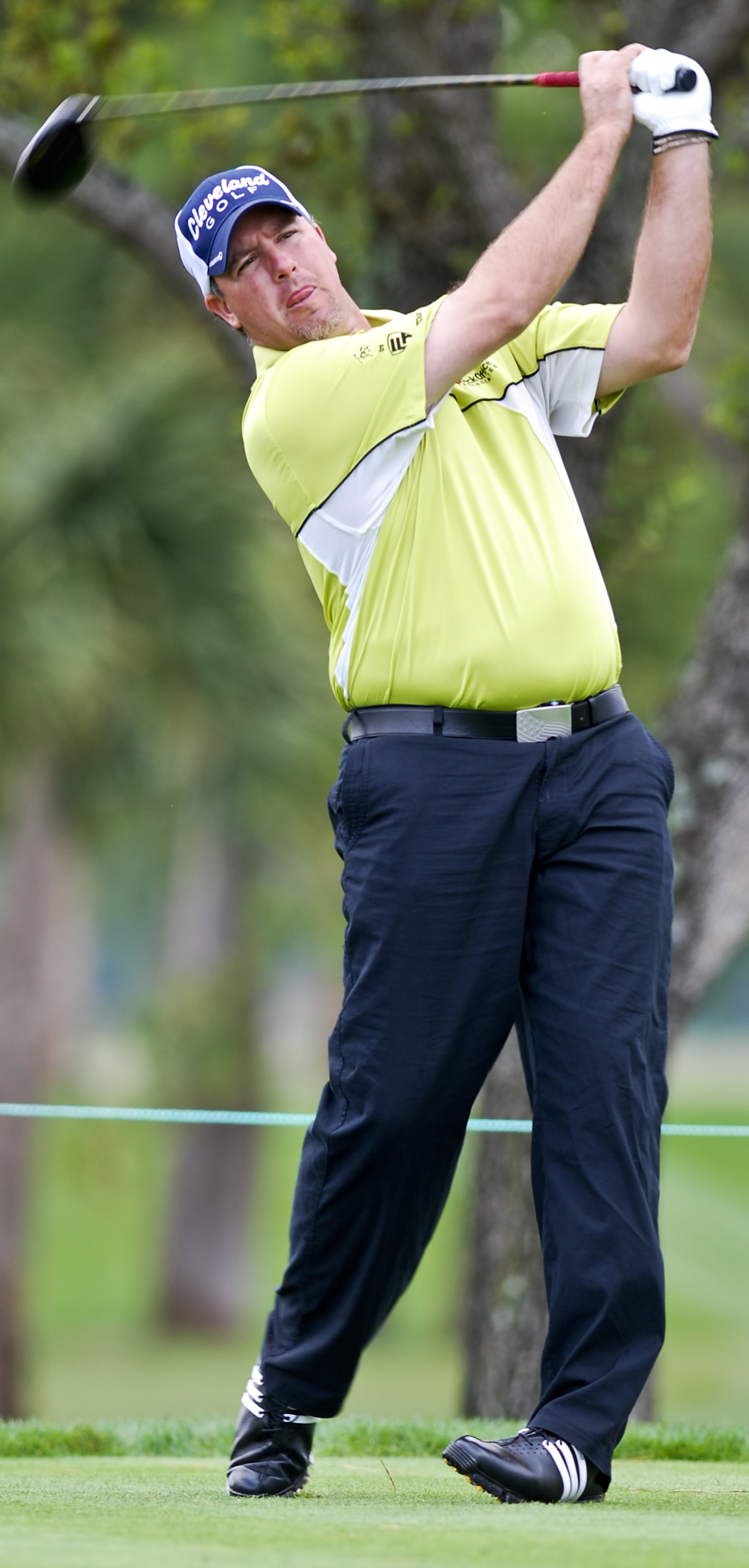
- Weekley in March 2009

Personal information
- Full name: Thomas Brent Weekley
- Nickname: Boo
- Nationality: United States
- Born: July 23, 1973 (age 53) Milton, Florida, U.S.
- Height: 6 ft 0 in (1.83 m)
- Weight: 210 lb (95 kg; 15 st)
- Spouse: Susan Matthews Weekley

Career
- Sport: Golf
- College: Abraham Baldwin Agricultural College
- Turned professional: 1997
- Current tour: PGA Tour Champions
- Former tours: PGA Tour; Korn Ferry Tour; European Tour
- Professional wins: 4
- Highest ranking: 23 (April 20, 2008)

Number of wins by tour
- PGA Tour: 3
- PGA Tour Champions: 1

Best results in major championships
- Masters Tournament: T20: 2008
- PGA Championship: T9: 2007
- U.S. Open: T26: 2007, 2008
- The Open Championship: T13: 2009

Thomas Brent "Boo" Weekley (born July 23, 1973) is an American professional golfer who plays on the PGA Tour.

== Biography ==
Born in Milton, Florida, Weekley turned professional in 1997 and played on mini-tours until 2002, when he qualified for the PGA Tour. He made the cut in only five of 24 events that year, and lost his tour card. From 2003 through 2006, he played on the Nationwide Tour, finishing well enough in 2006 to again qualify for the PGA Tour. His first victory came at the Verizon Heritage in April 2007.

Weekley's good form at the start of the 2007 season included two top 10 finishes before his victory, after which he reached a new career high of 55 in the Official World Golf Rankings. Later in 2007, he entered the top 50 of the rankings. He represented the United States at the 2007 Omega Mission Hills World Cup with Heath Slocum and finished in 2nd place.

In 2008, Weekley successfully defended his title at the Verizon Heritage, and rose into the top 25 of the rankings. Weekley shot to prominence at the 2008 Ryder Cup, with a succession of virtuoso displays of superb golf including an emphatic 4&2 victory over Oliver Wilson in final day Singles play. The final day was also notable however when Weekley was filmed riding his driver "cowboy horse" style down the first fairway.

Weekley's nickname comes from Yogi Bear's sidekick, Boo Boo Bear.

He attended Milton High School and then Abraham Baldwin Agricultural College where he studied turfgrass science. After only one year at ABAC, where he played on the golf team, Weekley returned home. He was hired as a hydroblaster at the Monsanto chemical plant in Pensacola, Fla. where he would be lowered into large ammonia tanks to clean them.

Weekley began his professional career on the Developmental Players Tour (DP Tour) in Atlanta, Ga., a tour co-founded by Jack Slocum, father of fellow PGA golfer and friend Heath Slocum. Weekley attended high school with Slocum and they played together on the golf team. He lists Ben Hogan as his hero. In May 2013, Weekley won the Crowne Plaza Invitational at Colonial in Fort Worth, Texas. Weekley beat Matt Kuchar by one stroke to take his first win in five years.

Since 2017, injuries have been significantly limiting Weekley's schedule. He played no professional golf events between the July 2017 RBC Canadian Open on the PGA Tour and the January 2019 Bahamas Great Exuma Classic on the Web.com Tour, suffering from tendinitis. Again, Weekley played no events between the November 2019 RSM Classic on the PGA Tour and the June 2022 Rex Hospital Open on the Korn Ferry Tour. Weekley no longer has full-time status on the PGA Tour, but continues to make limited starts using past champions status and sponsor exemptions.

In August 2023, Weekley began playing on the PGA Tour Champions.

== Professional wins (4) ==
=== PGA Tour wins (3) ===
No.	Date	Tournament	Winning score	To par	Margin of victory	Runner(s)-up
1	Apr 16, 2007	Verizon Heritage	67-69-66-68=270	−14	1 stroke	(South Africa) Ernie Els
2	Apr 20, 2008	Verizon Heritage (2)	69-64-65-71=269	−15	3 strokes	(Australia) Aaron Baddeley, (United States) Anthony Kim
3	May 26, 2013	Crowne Plaza Invitational at Colonial	67-67-66-66=266	−14	1 stroke	(United States) Matt Kuchar

PGA Tour playoff record (0–1)

No.	Year	Tournament	Opponents	Result
1	2007	The Honda Classic	(Argentina) José Cóceres, (Colombia) Camilo Villegas, (United States) Mark Wilson	Wilson won with birdie on third extra hole Villegas and Weekley eliminated by par on second hole

=== PGA Tour Champions wins (1) ===
No.	Date	Tournament	Winning score	To par	Margin of victory	Runner-up
1	May 10, 2026	Insperity Invitational	66-66-69=201	−15	3 strokes	(South Africa) Ernie Els

== Playoff record ==
Nationwide Tour playoff record (0–1)

No.	Year	Tournament	Opponent	Result
1	2006	National Mining Association Pete Dye Classic	(United States) Jason Enloe	Lost to par on first extra hole

Other playoff record (0–1)

No.	Year	Tournament	Opponents	Result
1	2007	Omega Mission Hills World Cup (with (United States) Heath Slocum)	Scotland − Colin Montgomerie and Marc Warren	Lost to par on third extra hole

== Results in major championships ==
Tournament	2007	2008	2009	2010	2011	2012	2013	2014	2015
Masters Tournament		T20	CUT					CUT	
U.S. Open	T26	T26	CUT				CUT	66	
The Open Championship	T35	CUT	T13				T58	CUT	
PGA Championship	T9	T20	T36	CUT			T12	WD	T37

Top 10
Did not play

CUT = missed the half-way cut
WD = withdrew
"T" indicates a tie for a place

=== Summary ===
Tournament	Wins	2nd	3rd	Top-5	Top-10	Top-25	Events	Cuts made
Masters Tournament	0	0	0	0	0	1	3	1
U.S. Open	0	0	0	0	0	0	5	3
The Open Championship	0	0	0	0	0	1	5	3
PGA Championship	0	0	0	0	1	3	7	5
Totals	0	0	0	0	1	5	20	12

- Most consecutive cuts made – 5 (2007 U.S. Open – 2008 U.S. Open)
- Longest streak of top-10s – 1

== Results in The Players Championship ==
Tournament	2007	2008	2009	2010	2011	2012	2013	2014	2015	2016	2017
The Players Championship	T44	T21	WD	T56	CUT		T48	CUT	CUT	T16	T48

Did not play

CUT = missed the halfway cut
WD = withdrew
"T" indicates a tie for a place

== Results in World Golf Championships ==
Tournament	2007	2008	2009	2010	2011	2012	2013	2014
Match Play		R16	R32					R64
Championship		T30	T61					T54
Invitational	T30	T66	T58	T46			T33	
Champions							T11	

Top 10
Did not play

QF, R16, R32, R64 = Round in which player lost in match play
"T" = Tied
Note that the HSBC Champions did not become a WGC event until 2009.

== U.S. national team appearances ==
- World Cup: 2007
- Ryder Cup: 2008 (winner)
- Wendy's 3-Tour Challenge (representing PGA Tour): 2010 (winners), 2011, 2013

== See also ==
- 2001 PGA Tour Qualifying School graduates
- 2006 Nationwide Tour graduates
