= Chris Anderson (golfer, born 1970) =

American professional golfer (born 1970)

Personal information
- Full name: Christopher Michael Anderson
- Nationality: United States
- Born: December 11, 1970 (age 55) West Covina, California, U.S.
- Height: 5 ft 9 in (1.75 m)
- Weight: 165 lb (75 kg; 11.8 st)
- Spouse: Jennifer
- Children: Maddie, Molly, Jack

Career
- Sport: Golf
- College: Mt. San Antonio College
- Turned professional: 1992
- Professional wins: 4

Number of wins by tour
- Korn Ferry Tour: 1
- Other: 3

Best results in major championships
- Masters Tournament: DNP
- PGA Championship: DNP
- U.S. Open: T61: 2003
- The Open Championship: DNP

Christopher Michael Anderson (born December 11, 1970) is an American professional golfer.

== Early life ==
Anderson was born in West Covina, California. He attended Mt. San Antonio College, a community college in Walnut, California.

== Professional career ==
In 1992, Anderson turned professional. He played on the Canadian Tour (1996–97, 1999–2002), Nationwide Tour (1998, 2004, 2006–09), and PGA Tour (2003, 2005). He won once on the Nationwide Tour at the 2004 SAS Carolina Classic. His best finish on the PGA Tour was T-4 at the 2003 Southern Farm Bureau Classic.

== Professional wins (4) ==
=== Nationwide Tour wins (1) ===
No.	Date	Tournament	Winning score	Margin of victory	Runners-up
1	May 30, 2004	SAS Carolina Classic	−13 (67-70-66-68=274)	Playoff	(United States) Jason Buha, (Australia) Paul Gow, (Australia) Brendan Jones

Nationwide Tour playoff record (1–1)

No.	Year	Tournament	Opponent(s)	Result
1	2004	SAS Carolina Classic	(United States) Jason Buha, (Australia) Paul Gow, (Australia) Brendan Jones	Won with par on eighth extra hole Buha and Gow eliminated by birdie on first hole
2	2008	Nationwide Tour Players Cup	(United States) Rick Price	Lost to bogey on first extra hole

=== Other wins (3) ===
- 1997 Two wins on Golden State Tour
- 2000 Shawnee Open

== Results in major championships ==
Tournament	2001	2002	2003
U.S. Open	CUT		T61

Note: The U.S. Open was the only major Anderson played.

Did not play

CUT = missed the half-way cut
"T" = tied for place

== See also ==
- 2002 PGA Tour Qualifying School graduates
- 2004 Nationwide Tour graduates
