= Tyler Williamson =

American golfer (born 1972)

Personal information
- Nationality: United States
- Born: May 17, 1972 (age 54) Sacramento, California, U.S.
- Height: 5 ft 7 in (1.70 m)
- Weight: 165 lb (75 kg; 11.8 st)

Career
- Sport: Golf
- College: California State University, Sacramento
- Turned professional: 1996
- Former tours: Nationwide Tour; NGA Hooters Tour
- Professional wins: 3

Number of wins by tour
- Korn Ferry Tour: 1

Tyler Williamson (born May 17, 1972) is an American professional golfer who played on the Nationwide Tour.

== Professional career ==
Williamson joined the Nationwide Tour in 2002 and won the Preferred Health Systems Wichita Open in his rookie season. He continued to play on the Nationwide Tour until 2008.

== Professional wins (3) ==
=== Nationwide Tour wins (1) ===
No.	Date	Tournament	Winning score	Margin of victory	Runners-up
1	Aug 18, 2002	Preferred Health Systems Wichita Open	−8 (68-67-71-66=272)	1 stroke	(United States) Keoke Cotner, (United States) Jeff Klauk

=== NGA Hooters Tour wins (2) ===
No.	Date	Tournament	Winning score	Margin of victory	Runner-up
1	Jul 9, 2000	Cypress Creek Golf Classic	−11 (66-65-69-69=269)	3 strokes	(United States) Tim Straub
2	Aug 27, 2000	Boomtown Casino Classic	−18 (65-70-67-68=270)	1 stroke	(United States) Bobby Elliott
