= Louisiana Open =

Golf tournament

Chitimacha Louisiana Open

Tournament information
- Location: Broussard, Louisiana
- Established: 1992
- Course: Le Triomphe Country Club
- Par: 71
- Length: 6,961 yards (6,365 m)
- Tour: Korn Ferry Tour
- Format: Stroke play
- Prize fund: US$750,000
- Month played: March
- Final year: 2022

Tournament record score
- Aggregate: 260 Casey Wittenberg (2012)
- To par: −24 Steven Alker (2002) −24 Mike Heinen (2002) −24 Brett Wetterich (2003) −24 Casey Wittenberg (2012)

Final champion
- (China) Yuan Yechun

Location map
- Location in the United States Location in Louisiana

The Chitimacha Louisiana Open was a golf tournament on the Korn Ferry Tour from 1992 to 2022. It was played annually at Le Triomphe Golf and Country Club in Broussard, Louisiana.

The 2022 purse was $750,000, with $135,000 going to the winner.

== Winners ==
Year	Winner	Score	To par	Margin of victory	Runner(s)-up
Chitimacha Louisiana Open
2022	(China) Yuan Yechun	270	−14	Playoff	(United States) Peter Uihlein
2021	(Mexico) Roberto Díaz	266	−18	1 stroke	(United States) Peter Uihlein
2020	Canceled due to the COVID-19 pandemic				
2019	(United States) Vince Covello	265	−19	Playoff	(United States) Justin Lower
2018	(Argentina) Julián Etulain	265	−19	2 strokes	(United States) Taylor Moore
2017	(United States) Casey Wittenberg (2)	263	−21	3 strokes	(China) Zhang Xinjun
2016	(United States) Wesley Bryan	270	−14	1 stroke	(Argentina) Julián Etulain
2015	(United States) Kelly Kraft	270	−14	1 stroke	(Australia) Rhein Gibson (South Korea) Lee Dong-hwan
2014	(United States) Kris Blanks	270	−14	Playoff	(United States) Brett Stegmaier
2013	(United States) Edward Loar	267	−17	2 strokes	(United States) Morgan Hoffmann
2012	(United States) Casey Wittenberg	260	−24	8 strokes	(United States) Paul Claxton (Argentina) Fabián Gómez (United States) Chris Riley
2011	(United States) Brett Wetterich (2)	271	−13	1 stroke	(Colombia) Andrés Echavarría (a)
2010	(Argentina) Fabián Gómez	269	−15	6 strokes	(United States) Scott Gutschewski (United States) Kyle Reifers (United States) Brian Vranesh
2009	(United States) Bubba Dickerson	274	−10	Playoff	(United States) Brian Vranesh
2008	(Australia) Gavin Coles	272	−12	1 stroke	(United States) Kyle Thompson
2007	(United States) Skip Kendall	268	−16	Playoff	(United States) Paul Claxton
2006	(United States) Johnson Wagner	272	−12	1 stroke	(United States) Chad Collins
2005	(United States) Ryan Hietala	270	−18	1 stroke	(United States) Sean O'Hair
2004	(United States) Jimmy Walker	272	−16	1 stroke	(United States) Rick Price
2003	(United States) Brett Wetterich	264	−24	3 strokes	(United States) Ken Duke
Louisiana Open
2002	(New Zealand) Steven Alker	264	−24	Playoff	(United States) Mike Heinen
Buy.com Louisiana Open
2001	(United States) Paul Claxton	271	−17	1 stroke	(United States) Tim Petrovic (United States) Steve Runge
2000	(United States) Rob McKelvey	274	−14	1 stroke	(Canada) Ian Leggatt
Nike Louisiana Open
1999	(United States) Matt Gogel	277	−11	1 stroke	(United States) Kris Cox
1998	(United States) John Wilson	274	−14	5 strokes	(United States) Steve Flesch
1997	(United States) Joe Daley (golfer)	198 (Note: Shortened to 54 holes due to rain.)	−18	3 strokes	(United States) Bobby Wadkins
1996	(United States) Paul Stankowski	266	−22	4 strokes	(United States) Greg Whisman
1995	(United States) Stan Utley	268	−20	2 strokes	(United States) Keith Fergus
1994	(United States) Bill Porter	276	−12	2 strokes	(United States) Brad Fabel
1993	(United States) R. W. Eaks	273	−15	2 strokes	(United States) Karl Kimball
Ben Hogan Louisiana Open
1992	(United States) Sean Murphy	200	−16	1 stroke	(Canada) Tony Grimes

== See also ==
- Louisiana State Open
