= Chris Tidland =

American golfer (born 1972)

Personal information
- Full name: Christopher Lee Tidland
- Nationality: United States
- Born: September 28, 1972 (age 54) Torrance, California, U.S.
- Height: 6 ft 0 in (1.83 m)
- Weight: 170 lb (77 kg; 12 st)

Career
- Sport: Golf
- College: Oklahoma State University
- Turned professional: 1995
- Current tour: Web.com Tour
- Former tours: PGA Tour, Canadian Tour
- Professional wins: 3

Number of wins by tour
- Korn Ferry Tour: 2
- Other: 1

Best results in major championships
- Masters Tournament: DNP
- PGA Championship: DNP
- U.S. Open: T51: 1999
- The Open Championship: CUT: 2011

Christopher Lee Tidland (born September 28, 1972) is an American professional golfer.

== Early life ==
Tidland was born in Torrance, California. He attended Oklahoma State University and graduated in 1995 with a management degree. Tidland led his team to the 1995 NCAA Division I Men's Championship and finished second in the individual tournament.

== Professional career ==
Tidland turned professional after graduating. He played on the PGA Tour's developmental tour in 1996, 1999, 2002–06, and 2008-09 where he won two events: the 2008 Albertsons Boise Open and the 2009 Preferred Health Systems Wichita Open.

Tidland played on the PGA Tour in 2001 and 2007 with his best finish a T-6 at the 2007 AT&T Classic. He was unable to finish high enough on the money list to retain his Tour card either year. In 2009, he finished 6th on the Nationwide Tour money list to earn his 2010 PGA Tour card. Tidland finished 148th on the Tour, retaining conditional status for 2011.

Tidland also played on the Canadian Tour in 1997 and 1998 where he won the Bayer Championship in 1998.

In 2011, Tidland qualified for the British Open. In 2011, he made his 13th appearance at PGA Tour Qualifying school, three less than the record of 16 set by Jeff Hart. TIdland failed to earn his card and will return to the developmental tour in 2012.

== Professional wins (3) ==
=== Nationwide Tour wins (2) ===
No.	Date	Tournament	Winning score	Margin of victory	Runner(s)-up
1	Sep 14, 2008	Albertsons Boise Open	−20 (69-65-66-64=264)	4 strokes	(United States) Scott Piercy
2	Aug 9, 2009	Preferred Health Systems Wichita Open	−16 (67-68-68-65=268)	1 stroke	(United States) Chad Collins, (United States) Dave Schultz

Nationwide Tour playoff record (0–3)

No.	Year	Tournament	Opponent(s)	Result
1	2003	First Tee Arkansas Classic	(United States) Ted Purdy	Lost to birdie on third extra hole
2	2004	Scholarship America Showdown	(Australia) Mathew Goggin, (United States) Kevin Stadler, (United States) Kyle Thompson	Stadler won with birdie on third extra hole Thompson eliminated by par on second hole Goggin eliminated by par on first hole
3	2009	Fort Smith Classic	(United States) Jason Enloe	Lost to par on first extra hole

=== Canadian Tour wins (1) ===
No.	Date	Tournament	Winning score	Margin of victory	Runners-up
1	Sep 21, 1998	Bayer Championship	−21 (67-66-65-65=263)	3 strokes	(United States) Ken Duke, (United States) Todd Fanning, (United States) Mike Grob

== Results in major championships ==
Tournament	1995	1996	1997	1998	1999	2000	2001	2002	2003	2004	2005	2006	2007	2008	2009	2010	2011
U.S. Open	CUT			CUT	T51	CUT											
The Open Championship																	CUT

Note: Tidland never played in the Masters Tournament nor the PGA Championship.

Did not play
- CUT = missed the half-way cut

== See also ==
- 2000 PGA Tour Qualifying School graduates
- 2006 PGA Tour Qualifying School graduates
- 2009 Nationwide Tour graduates
