= Jimmy Walker (golfer) =

American professional golfer (born 1979)

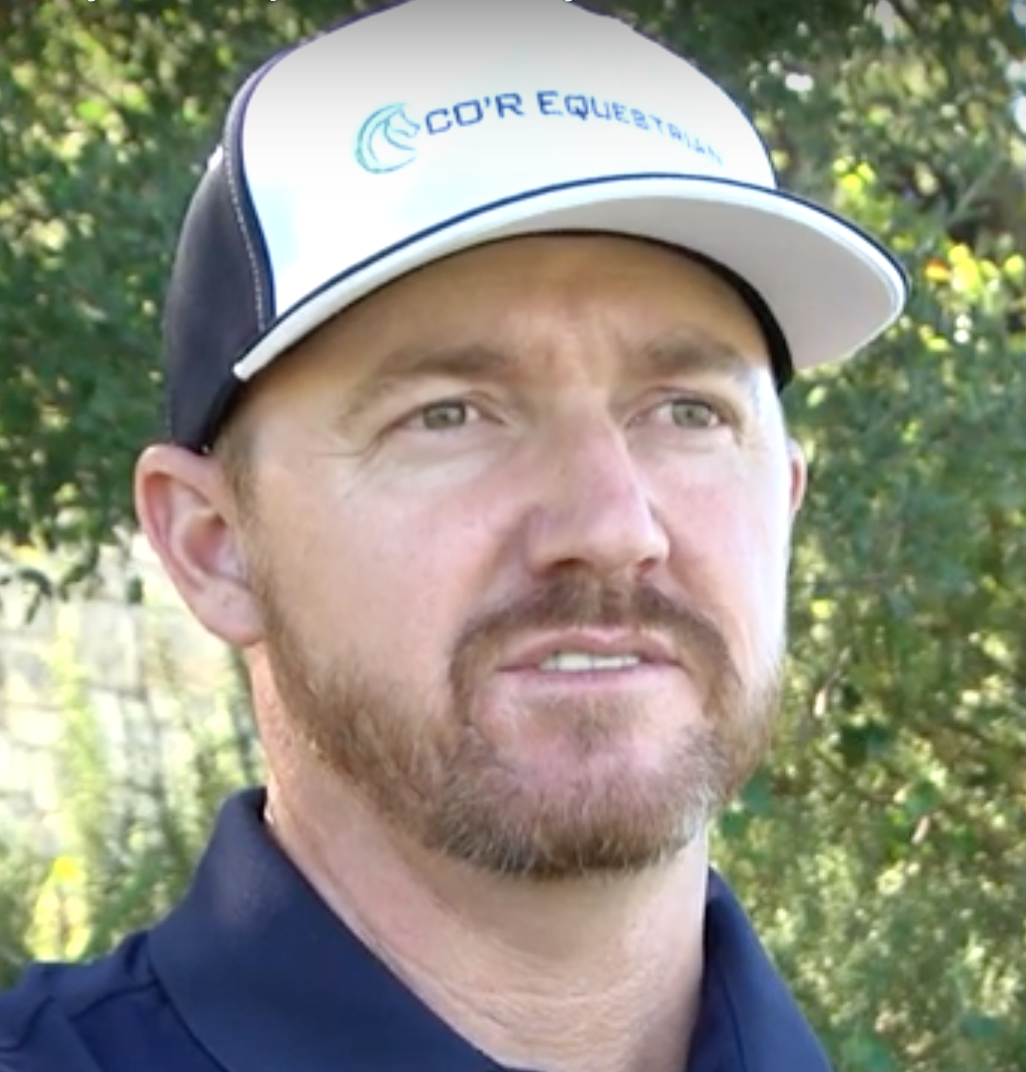
- Walker in 2016

Personal information
- Full name: James William Walker
- Nationality: United States
- Born: January 16, 1979 (age 47) Oklahoma City, Oklahoma, U.S.
- Height: 6 ft 2 in (1.88 m)
- Weight: 180 lb (82 kg; 13 st)
- Spouse: Erin Stiegemeier (Divorced)
- Children: 2

Career
- Sport: Golf
- College: Baylor University
- Turned professional: 2001
- Current tour: PGA Tour
- Former tours: Nationwide Tour; Gateway Tour
- Professional wins: 11
- Highest ranking: 10 (March 29, 2015)

Number of wins by tour
- PGA Tour: 6
- European Tour: 1
- Korn Ferry Tour: 3
- Other: 2

Best results in major championships (wins: 1)
- Masters Tournament: T8: 2014
- PGA Championship: Won: 2016
- U.S. Open: T9: 2014
- The Open Championship: T26: 2014

Achievements and awards
- Nationwide Tour money list winner: 2004
- Nationwide Tour Player of the Year: 2004

James William Walker (born January 16, 1979) is an American professional golfer who plays on the PGA Tour. After playing in 187 events without a win on the PGA Tour, Walker won three times in the first eight events of the 2014 season. He is a six-time winner on the PGA Tour and in 2016 won his first major title at the PGA Championship.

== Early life ==
Born in Oklahoma City, Walker and his family later moved to Texas to the San Antonio area, and he graduated from Canyon High School in New Braunfels in 1997. He played college golf at Baylor University in Waco, Texas and turned professional at age 22 in 2001.

== Professional career ==
=== 2003–04: Nationwide Tour ===
Walker played on the Nationwide Tour full-time in 2003 and 2004. In 2004, he won the first two professional events of his career at the BellSouth Panama Championship and the Chitimacha Louisiana Open. Walker ended the 2004 season as the Nationwide Tour's leading money winner and won Player of the Year honors, while in the process earning his PGA Tour card for the first time.

=== 2005–13: Early PGA Tour career ===
Walker only played in nine PGA Tour events in 2005 due to injury, making three cuts and a best finish of 17th at the MCI Heritage. He played his first full season on the PGA Tour in 2006, where he played in 21 events. Walker made nine cuts and had one top-25 finish. He ended the season 202nd on the money list, which was not enough to retain his playing rights. Walker went back to the Nationwide Tour in 2007, where he added a third title to his name at the National Mining Association Pete Dye Classic and finished in 25th place on the Nationwide Tour's money list, which qualified him for a PGA Tour card for the 2008 season. Again, Walker endured a difficult season, making 13 cuts in 24 events, with three top-25 finishes. He ended the year 192nd on the FedEx Cup Standings and entered the year end Q-school to try to regain his card. He finished in a tie for 11th, which was enough to regain his card for the 2009 season.

Walker fared better in 2009, where he recorded his first two top-10 finishes on the PGA Tour, including a T5 at the Turning Stone Resort Championship. Walker finished the 2009 season ranked 125th on the money list, securing the last available tour card for the next season. In 2010, Walker made less than half of the cuts he played in, but had a T3 and T4 finish to boost his season's placing. He finished 2010 ranked 103rd on the money list. In 2011, Walker enjoyed his best season to that point, helped by three 4th/T4 finishes throughout the season. He was 68th in the FedEx Cup standings and qualified for the third FedEx Cup playoff event, the BMW Championship, for the first time. Walker followed up a solid 2011 season with another good year in 2012. He finished the year 43rd in the FedEx Cup standings, with six top-10 finishes. Walker started to develop a consistent game on the PGA Tour, evidenced when he made 25 consecutive cuts from the 2012 John Deere Classic to the 2013 Memorial Tournament. During this run, Walker had finishes of T2, T3, and T4 as he finished the 2013 season with over $2 million in tour earnings.

=== 2014–present: PGA Tour victories and success ===
The 2014 season was the first to begin with six events in the fall of 2013. In the first of these, Walker won his first PGA Tour event at the 2013 Frys.com Open, after nine years and 188 PGA Tour starts. He won by two strokes over Vijay Singh after shooting 62–66 over the weekend. The win gave him an exemption into the Hyundai Tournament of Champions, and earned him his first trip to the Masters Tournament and a PGA Tour card until the end of 2016. Walker also entered the world's top 50 for the first time.

Walker opened up 2014 finishing T21 at his first visit to the Hyundai Tournament of Champions. The following week, he earned his second PGA Tour win at the Sony Open in Hawaii. He birdied four of the final six holes and shot a final round 63 to win by one stroke over Chris Kirk.

Five weeks later, in early February 2014, Walker won the AT&T Pebble Beach National Pro-Am by one stroke over Dustin Johnson and Jim Renner. He had a six-stroke advantage going into the final round, but shot a two-over-par 74 on Sunday and needed to hole a five-foot par putt on the 18th for the victory. This was his third victory of the 2014 season in just eight starts, after previously going 187 events without a victory. With his win, Walker became the leader on the 2014 money list, FedExCup standings, and Ryder Cup points standings. He also raised his Official World Golf Ranking to 24th. A T8 finish at the 2014 Masters Tournament raised his ranking to 19th, and ensured him an invitation into the 2015 tournament. He went on to post top-ten finishes at two other majors, a T9 at the 2014 U.S. Open, and a T7 the 2014 PGA Championship. His highly successful season earned him a spot on the 2014 Ryder Cup, another personal first. Walker went as high as 17th in the OWGR during the 2014 season.

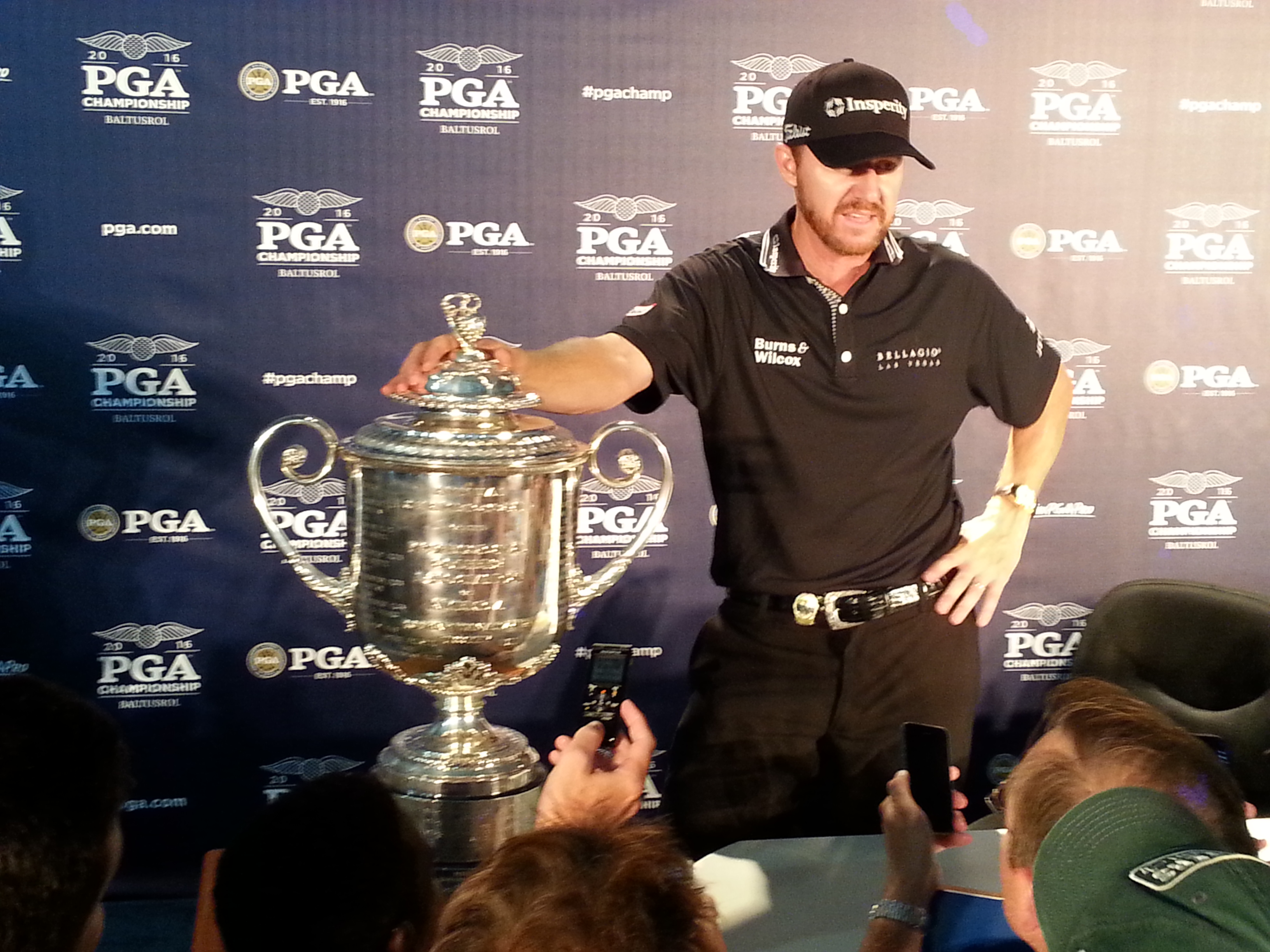
Jimmy Walker poses with the Wannamaker Trophy after his victory in the 2016 PGA Championship at Baltusrol in New Jersey.

In January 2015, Walker lost in a sudden-death playoff at the Hyundai Tournament of Champions in Hawaii to Patrick Reed. After finishing at 21-under-par in regulation play, Walker was beaten by a Reed birdie on the first extra hole. The following week on tour, Walker defended his Sony Open in Hawaii title with a nine-stroke victory after a final round 63. It was Walker's fourth career PGA Tour victory and it moved him 13th in the OWGR. In March 2015, Walker earned his fifth PGA Tour win and second of the season at the Valero Texas Open with a four-stroke victory over Jordan Spieth. Residing in San Antonio, this meant Walker had claimed victory in his hometown event. The win moved Walker into the world's top 10 for the first time and took him to the top of the FedEx Cup standings. In May 2015, Walker tied for second place at the AT&T Byron Nelson. For the season, Walker had two victories and two second-place finishes, putting him in the top-10 on the PGA Tour money list for the second year in a row.

At the 2016 PGA Championship at Baltusrol Golf Club, Walker shot a 65 in the first round to hold the lead by one stroke. This represented the first time that he had ever led a major in his career. He followed this with a 66 in the second round for a 9-under total and share of the halfway lead with Robert Streb. After a washout on Saturday, Walker shot a third round 68 on Sunday morning, finishing with a birdie on the 18th hole to take the 54-hole lead by one stroke. Sunday evening saw Walker shoot a bogey-free round of 67 to capture his first major championship, winning by one stroke over Jason Day, who after eagleing the 18th hole forced Walker to make par for the championship. Walker, in his third shot, played a safe approach from the rough to the green, taking two putts to make par and maintain his 1-shot lead for his first major title.

Walker ended the 2021–22 season 59th in earnings, but he moved up to 50th after the PGA Tour removed LIV Golf players from the rankings. After considering retirement in 2022, Walker is playing the 2022–23 season using a career earnings exemption.

== Personal ==
Walker is married to the former Erin Stiegemeier, whom he met while she served as a volunteer at a 2004 Nationwide Tour event. His wife is a nationally ranked show jumper and they have two sons. Walker is also an avid astrophotographer, his photos have been featured on Astronomy Picture of the Day (APOD). His home golf course is San Antonio Country Club in San Antonio, Texas, where he has the current course record of 61 (-11).

In April 2017, Walker revealed that he had contracted Lyme disease.

== Professional wins (11) ==
=== PGA Tour wins (6) ===
Legend
Major championships (1)
Other PGA Tour (5)

No.	Date	Tournament	Winning score	To par	Margin of victory	Runner(s)-up
1	Oct 13, 2013	Frys.com Open	70-69-62-66=267	−17	2 strokes	(Fiji) Vijay Singh
2	Jan 12, 2014	Sony Open in Hawaii	66-67-67-63=263	−17	1 stroke	(United States) Chris Kirk
3	Feb 9, 2014	AT&T Pebble Beach National Pro-Am	66-69-67-74=276	−11	1 stroke	(United States) Dustin Johnson, (United States) Jim Renner
4	Jan 18, 2015	Sony Open in Hawaii (2)	66-66-62-63=257	−23	9 strokes	(United States) Scott Piercy
5	Mar 29, 2015	Valero Texas Open	71-67-69-70=277	−11	4 strokes	(United States) Jordan Spieth
6	Jul 31, 2016	PGA Championship	65-66-68-67=266	−14	1 stroke	(Australia) Jason Day

PGA Tour playoff record (0–1)

No.	Year	Tournament	Opponent	Result
1	2015	Hyundai Tournament of Champions	(United States) Patrick Reed	Lost to birdie on first extra hole

=== Nationwide Tour wins (3) ===
No.	Date	Tournament	Winning score	To par	Margin of victory	Runner(s)-up
1	Feb 8, 2004	BellSouth Panama Championship	65-69-70-69=273	−7	5 strokes	(United States) Tom Scherrer
2	Mar 28, 2004	Chitimacha Louisiana Open	69-64-74-65=272	−16	1 stroke	(United States) Rick Price
3	Aug 26, 2007	National Mining Association Pete Dye Classic	68-70-68-67=273	−15	1 stroke	(United States) Justin Hicks, (Australia) Matt Jones

=== Canadian Tour wins (1) ===
No.	Date	Tournament	Winning score	To par	Margin of victory	Runner-up
1	Apr 7, 2002	Scottsdale Swing at Eagle Mountain	66-65-64-66=261	−27	2 strokes	(Canada) Derek Gillespie

=== Gateway Tour wins (1) ===
No.	Date	Tournament	Winning score	To par	Margin of victory	Runners-up
1	Jul 11, 2002	Dawson Companies Challenge	64-69-73=206	−10	1 stroke	(United States) Brian Kontak, (United States) Michael Walton

== Major championships ==
=== Wins (1) ===
Year	Championship	54 holes	Winning score	Margin	Runner-up
2016	PGA Championship	1 shot lead	−14 (65-66-68-67=266)	1 stroke	(Australia) Jason Day

=== Results timeline ===
Results not in chronological order in 2020.

Tournament	2001	2002	2003	2004	2005	2006	2007	2008	2009
Masters Tournament									
U.S. Open	T52	CUT							
The Open Championship									
PGA Championship									

Tournament	2010	2011	2012	2013	2014	2015	2016	2017	2018
Masters Tournament					T8	T38	T29	T18	T20
U.S. Open					T9	T58	CUT	CUT	T56
The Open Championship				CUT	T26	T30	CUT	T54	CUT
PGA Championship	CUT		T21	CUT	T7	CUT	1	CUT	T42

Tournament	2019	2020	2021	2022	2023	2024	2025	2026
Masters Tournament	T36	60	CUT					
PGA Championship	T23	CUT	T64		CUT	CUT	CUT	CUT
U.S. Open	CUT	CUT	T70					
The Open Championship	CUT	NT	CUT					

Win
Top 10
Did not play

CUT = missed the half-way cut
"T" = tied
NT = no tournament due to COVID-19 pandemic

=== Summary ===
Tournament	Wins	2nd	3rd	Top-5	Top-10	Top-25	Events	Cuts made
Masters Tournament	0	0	0	0	1	3	8	7
PGA Championship	1	0	0	1	2	4	15	6
U.S. Open	0	0	0	0	1	1	10	5
The Open Championship	0	0	0	0	0	0	8	3
Totals	1	0	0	1	4	8	41	21

- Most consecutive cuts made – 7 (2014 Masters – 2015 Open)
- Longest streak of top-10s – 2 (2014 Masters – 2014 U.S. Open)

== Results in The Players Championship ==
Tournament	2010	2011	2012	2013	2014	2015	2016	2017	2018	2019
The Players Championship	T26	CUT	T35	T15	T6	CUT	CUT	T56	T2	T67

Tournament	2020	2021	2022
The Players Championship	C	CUT	T55

Top 10

CUT = missed the halfway cut
"T" indicates a tie for a place
C = Canceled after the first round due to the COVID-19 pandemic

== Results in World Golf Championships ==
Results not in chronological order prior to 2015.

Tournament	2013	2014	2015	2016	2017
Championship		T25	T31	6	T25
Match Play		R32	T52	T38	T39
Invitational		T26	T53	T16	T28
Champions	T46	T35		T77	

Top 10
Did not play

QF, R16, R32, R64 = Round in which player lost in match play
"T" = Tied

== PGA Tour career summary ==
Season	Starts	Cuts made	Wins (majors)	2nd	3rd	Top-10	Top-25	Earnings ($)	Money list rank
2001	3	1	0	0	0	0	0	13,164	n/a
2002	1	0	0	0	0	0	0	0	n/a
2003	1	0	0	0	0	0	0	0	n/a
2004	1	0	0	0	0	0	0	0	n/a
2005	9	3	0	0	0	0	2	155,850	207
2006	21	9	0	0	0	0	1	153,950	202
2007	0	0	0	0	0	0	0	0	n/a
2008	24	13	0	0	0	0	3	282,249	185
2009	24	15	0	0	0	2	5	662,683	125
2010	27	13	0	0	1	2	6	937,987	103
2011	24	16	0	0	0	4	7	1,336,556	67
2012	28	23	0	0	0	6	9	1,638,419	48
2013	24	18	0	1	1	5	10	2,117,570	30
2014	27	23	3	0	0	10	19	5,787,016	4
2015	24	21	2	2	0	6	9	4,521,350	10
2016	25	18	1 (1)	0	1	5	12	4,148,546	10
2017	21	14	0	0	0	1	7	1,101,162	98
2018	23	17	0	1	0	4	7	2,027,312	55
2019	22	15	0	0	0	0	3	590,437	159
2020	16	10	0	0	0	0	2	243,370	180
Career*	345	229	6 (1)	4	3	45	102	25,717,623	55

* As of 2020 season

== U.S. national team appearances ==
Professional

- Ryder Cup: 2014, 2016 (winners)
- Presidents Cup: 2015 (winners)
- World Cup: 2016

== See also ==
- 2004 Nationwide Tour graduates
- 2007 Nationwide Tour graduates
- 2008 PGA Tour Qualifying School graduates
