= Peek'n Peak Classic =

Tournament information
- Location: Findley Lake, New York
- Established: 2002
- Course: Peek'n Peak Resort
- Par: 72
- Length: 6,888 yards (6,298 m)
- Tour: Nationwide Tour
- Format: Stroke play
- Prize fund: US$600,000
- Month played: June/July
- Final year: 2007

Tournament record score
- Aggregate: 273 Roland Thatcher (2007)
- To par: −15 as above

Final champion
- (United States) Roland Thatcher
- Location in the United States Location in New York

The Peek'n Peak Classic was a golf tournament on the Nationwide Tour. It was played from 2002 to 2007 on the Upper Course of Peek'n Peak Resort in Findley Lake, New York, United States.

The 2007 purse was $600,000, with $108,000 going to the winner.

After nine years, the Web.com Tour returned to the resort for the LECOM Health Challenge.

== Winners ==
Year	Winner	Score	To par	Margin of victory	Runner(s)-up
Peek'n Peak Classic
2007	(United States) Roland Thatcher	273	−15	3 strokes	(United States) Paul Claxton
2006	(United States) John Merrick	277	−11	Playoff	(Australia) Gavin Coles
Lake Erie Charity Classic
2005	(Mexico) Esteban Toledo	274	−14	2 strokes	(United States) Jeff Gove
2004	(United States) Kevin Stadler	279	−9	Playoff	(New Zealand) Michael Long (United States) Bubba Watson
2003	(United States) Guy Boros	275	−13	1 stroke	(United States) Chris Couch (United States) Bob Heintz
2002	(United States) Patrick Moore	275	−9	1 stroke	(United States) Hunter Haas
