= Jeff Klauk =

American professional golfer (born 1977)

Personal information
- Nationality: United States
- Born: November 28, 1977 (age 48) Boynton Beach, Florida, U.S.
- Height: 6 ft 0 in (1.83 m)
- Weight: 185 lb (84 kg; 13.2 st)

Career
- Sport: Golf
- College: Florida Southern College
- Turned professional: 2000
- Current tour: Web.com Tour
- Former tour: PGA Tour
- Professional wins: 2

Number of wins by tour
- Korn Ferry Tour: 2

Jeffrey Michael Klauk (/klaʊk/; born November 28, 1977) is an American professional golfer who has played on the PGA Tour and the Web.com Tour.

== Amateur career ==
Klauk was born in Boynton Beach, Florida. He played golf at Nease High School. He played collegiately at Florida Southern College where his team won the NCAA Division II Championship three times (1998–2000) and he won the individual title in 2000. He also played on the 2000 Palmer Cup team. He won the Southeastern Amateur in 1998 and 1999.

== Professional career ==
Klauk turned professional in 2000. Since then he has primarily been on the second-tier Nationwide Tour, but in 2008 finished third on the money list to earn his 2009 PGA Tour card.

He has two professional wins on the Nationwide Tour. One came in 2003, at the Preferred Health Systems Wichita Open. The other came five years later in 2008 at the Melwood Prince George's County Open, which propelled him into the top 25 on the 2008 Nationwide Tour money list.

He had a successful rookie year on the PGA Tour and finished ranked 71st on the money list to retain his tour card.

Klauk's professional career has been marred by a history of injuries and epileptic seizures. In September 2012, after brain surgery, he made his first professional golf start for the first time in fourteen months at the Web.com Tour's Albertsons Boise Open. Klauk started 2013 with a "major medical extension" on the PGA Tour, however he failed to earn enough money ($578,937 in eight starts) to retain his card.

== Personal life ==
Klauk married Shanna Nagy, a fellow Florida Southern graduate. She won nine collegiate titles including the NCAA Division II Championship in 1996 and 1998.

Klauk has two children, Jackson and Bridget.

== Amateur wins ==
- 1998 Southeastern Amateur
- 1999 Southeastern Amateur
- 2000 NCAA Division II Championship

== Professional wins (2) ==
=== Nationwide Tour wins (2) ===
No.	Date	Tournament	Winning score	Margin of victory	Runners-up
1	Aug 24, 2003	Preferred Health Systems Wichita Open	−19 (66-69-64-66=265)	1 stroke	(United States) Mike Brisky, (Australia) Mark Hensby
2	May 25, 2008	Melwood Prince George's County Open	−12 (64-70-73-69=276)	1 stroke	(United States) Jeff Brehaut, (United States) David Mathis

== U.S. national team appearances ==
Amateur

- Palmer Cup: 2000

== See also ==
- 2008 Nationwide Tour graduates
