= 2008 Nationwide Tour graduates =

This is a list of players who graduated from the Nationwide Tour in 2008. The top 25 players on the Nationwide Tour's money list in 2008 earned their PGA Tour card for 2009.

	2008 Nationwide Tour		2009 PGA Tour				
Player	Money list rank	Earnings ($)	Starts	Cuts made	Best finish	Money list rank	Earnings ($)
(United States) Matt Bettencourt*	1	447,863	31	17	T5	111	740,037
(Zimbabwe) Brendon de Jonge	2	437,035	29	16	T7	139	536,696
(United States) Jeff Klauk*	3	407,418	29	21	4/T4 (twice)	71	1,243,696
(Australia) Jarrod Lyle	4	382,738	21	11	T6	175	275,195
(United States) Bill Lunde*	5	341,446	27	15	T4	102	825,691
(United States) Colt Knost*	6	329,509	24	11	T25	193	180,754
(United States) Darron Stiles	7	324,627	20	6	T9	188	199,385
(Australia) Greg Chalmers	8	321,930	26	15	T2	89	1,058,286
(United States) Scott Piercy*	9	320,187	28	16	T5	90	1,032,716
(England) Greg Owen	10	309,805	30	19	T9	109	763,517
(United States) Peter Tomasulo*	11	296,704	25	5	T16	201	128,706
(United States) Rick Price*	12	284,922	21	6	T54	216	66,689
(United States) Kris Blanks*	13	280,588	20	9	T7	170	307,130
(United States) David Mathis*	14	276,412	27	15	T17	160	364,959
(United States) Casey Wittenberg*	15	271,919	25	10	T7	159	376,076
(United States) D. A. Points	16	266,696	29	19	3	66	1,320,021
(India) Arjun Atwal	17	259,186	12	4	T33	209	76,676
(Australia) Aron Price*	18	249,144	27	20	T6	144	487,454
(Australia) Marc Leishman*	T19	244,224	28	18	T2	47	1,742,243
(United States) Brendon Todd*	T19	244,224	21	5	T12	186	203,841
(United States) Scott Gutschewski	21	238,215	19	5	T17	192	183,375
(United States) Spencer Levin*	22	236,185	25	13	T7	141	531,240
(United States) Bryce Molder	23	234,631	21	13	T2	63	1,381,211
(United States) Matt Weibring*	24	228,155	22	11	T8	138	542,066
(United States) Ricky Barnes*	25	218,902	23	11	T2	120	684,863

*PGA Tour rookie for 2009.
T = Tied
Green background indicates the player retained his PGA Tour card for 2010 (finished inside the top 125).
Yellow background indicates the player did not retain his PGA Tour card for 2010, but retained conditional status (finished between 126 and 150).
Red background indicates the player did not retain his PGA Tour card for 2010 (finished outside the top 150).

== Runners-up on the PGA Tour in 2009 ==
No.	Date	Player	Tournament	Winner	Winning score	Runner-up score
1	Jun 14	(United States) Bryce Molder	St. Jude Classic	(United States) Brian Gay	−18 (64-66-66-66=262)	−13 (69-63-65-70=267)
2	Jun 22	(United States) Ricky Barnes	U.S. Open	(United States) Lucas Glover	−4 (69-64-70-73=276)	−2 (67-65-70-76=278)
3	Aug 2	(Australia) Greg Chalmers	Buick Open	(United States) Tiger Woods	−20 (71-63-65-69=268)	−17 (66-68-69-68=271)
4	Sep 13	(Australia) Marc Leishman	BMW Championship	(United States) Tiger Woods	−19 (68-67-62-68=265)	−11 (67-69-68-69=273)

== See also ==
- 2008 PGA Tour Qualifying School graduates
