= Ryan Hietala =

American golfer

Personal information
- Nationality: United States
- Born: November 8, 1973 (age 52) Bellingham, Washington, U.S.
- Height: 6 ft 5 in (1.96 m)
- Weight: 235 lb (107 kg; 16.8 st)

Career
- Sport: Golf
- College: University of Texas-El Paso
- Turned professional: 1997
- Former tours: PGA Tour; Nationwide Tour
- Professional wins: 2

Number of wins by tour
- Korn Ferry Tour: 2

Ryan Hietala (born November 8, 1973) is an American professional golfer who played on the PGA Tour and the Nationwide Tour.

== Career ==
Hietala was born in Bellingham, Washington. He played college golf at the University of Texas-El Paso, graduating in 1998 with a degree in criminal justice. He turned professional in 1997.

Hietala has played on several mini-tours and third-tier tours: Tight Lies Tour (1997–2001), Canadian Tour (1998), and Golden Bear Tour (2002). He played on the Nationwide Tour in 1999, 2003–2005, 2007–2009. He played on the PGA Tour in 2006 after finishing T18 in the 2005 qualifying school. He made only seven cuts in 23 starts with his best finish at the FedEx St. Jude Classic - T38.

Hietala has two wins on the Nationwide Tour.

== Professional wins (2) ==
=== Nationwide Tour wins (2) ===
No.	Date	Tournament	Winning score	Margin of victory	Runner-up
1	Mar 27, 2005	Chitimacha Louisiana Open	−18 (66-71-65-68=270)	1 stroke	(United States) Sean O'Hair
2	Aug 3, 2008	Cox Classic	−19 (64-62-70-69=265)	Playoff	(United States) David Branshaw

Nationwide Tour playoff record (1–0)

No.	Year	Tournament	Opponent	Result
1	2008	Cox Classic	(United States) David Branshaw	Won with par on first extra hole

== See also ==
- 2005 PGA Tour Qualifying School graduates
