= Jason Enloe =

American professional golfer (born 1974)

Personal information
- Nationality: United States
- Born: July 16, 1974 (age 52) Decatur, Illinois, U.S.
- Height: 5 ft 8 in (1.73 m)
- Weight: 165 lb (75 kg; 11.8 st)

Career
- Sport: Golf
- College: Southern Methodist University
- Turned professional: 1997
- Former tour: Nationwide Tour
- Professional wins: 2

Number of wins by tour
- Korn Ferry Tour: 2

Jason Enloe (born July 16, 1974) is an American professional golfer who played on the Nationwide Tour.

== Career ==
Enloe was born in Decatur, Illinois. He attended Southern Methodist University and turned professional in 1997.

Enloe has never played in a PGA Tour event, but has won twice on the Nationwide Tour, once in 2006 and another in 2009.

Enloe was head coach of SMU from 2014 to 2019.

== Amateur wins (2) ==
- 1996 Monroe Invitational, Northeast Amateur

== Professional wins (2) ==
=== Nationwide Tour wins (2) ===
No.	Date	Tournament	Winning score	Margin of victory	Runner-up
1	Aug 27, 2006	National Mining Association Pete Dye Classic	−14 (70-70-66-68=274)	Playoff	(United States) Boo Weekley
2	Jun 21, 2009	Fort Smith Classic	−15 (64-65-71-65=265)	Playoff	(United States) Chris Tidland

Nationwide Tour playoff record (2–0)

No.	Year	Tournament	Opponent	Result
1	2006	National Mining Association Pete Dye Classic	(United States) Boo Weekley	Won with par on first extra hole
2	2009	Fort Smith Classic	(United States) Chris Tidland	Won with par on first extra hole

== U.S. national team appearances ==
- Eisenhower Trophy: 1996
