= Somerby Golf Club and Community =

Coordinates: 44°2′52″N 92°38′5″W

Somerby Golf Club is a private golf club and community on the north side of Byron, Minnesota, United States. The course was designed by architect and golf pro John Fought, and by golf pro Tom Lehman.

Construction for the course and the surrounding community began in May 2002 and was completed in April 2004. The principal developer was Golden Tee Development LLC, a partnership between Minnesota-based companies, Ames Construction, Inc. and Wensmann Homes, Inc. On November 11, 2008, Ames Construction, Inc. announced their acquisition of Wensmann's interest in the joint venture, resulting in 100% interest.

== Accolades ==
Somerby was ranked 8th in 2005 by Golf Digest for best new golf private golf courses in the US. Golfweek Magazine rated Somerby in 2006, as a residential "Course of Distinction." In 2007, Golf Digest ranked Somerby 7th for the best Minnesota courses.

== Tournaments ==
Somerby hosted a Nationwide Tour event called the Showdown at Somerby in 2006 and 2007.

== Somerby Golf Community ==
The Somerby Golf Community is a planned community, with both on-and-off-course homes and home sites surrounding the golf course. Other amenities include a clubhouse, restaurant, swimming pool, tennis courts, and a park.
