= 2004 Nationwide Tour graduates =

This is a list of players who graduated from the Nationwide Tour in 2004. The top 20 players on the Nationwide Tour's money list in 2004 earned their PGA Tour card for 2005.

| | 2004 Nationwide Tour | | 2005 PGA Tour | | | | |
| Player | Money list rank | Earnings ($) | Starts | Cuts made | Best finish | Money list rank | Earnings ($) |
|---|---|---|---|---|---|---|---|
| (United States) Jimmy Walker* | 1 | 371,346 | 9 | 3 | 17 | 207 | 155,850 |
| (United States) D. A. Points* | 2 | 332,815 | 33 | 15 | T13 (twice) | 161 | 400,540 |
| (Japan) Ryuji Imada* | 3 | 313,185 | 25 | 14 | 5 | 121 | 650,221 |
| (United States) Franklin Langham | 4 | 312,896 | 31 | 14 | T19 (twice) | 164 | 380,436 |
| (United States) Nick Watney* | 5 | 301,988 | 31 | 15 | T6 | 127 | 605,369 |
| (Australia) Brendan Jones* | 6 | 292,715 | 28 | 14 | T2 | 144 | 498,817 |
| (United States) James Driscoll* | 7 | 281,161 | 26 | 11 | 2 | 100 | 849,891 |
| (United States) Charles Warren | 8 | 275,138 | 31 | 14 | T3 | 77 | 1,007,276 |
| (United States) Justin Bolli* | 9 | 273,387 | 24 | 9 | T15 | 192 | 207,400 |
| (United States) Brett Wetterich | 10 | 253,637 | 28 | 10 | T6 | 132 | 576,029 |
| (Australia) Paul Gow | 11 | 247,218 | 27 | 13 | T12 | 174 | 324,459 |
| (Australia) Bradley Hughes | 12 | 233,968 | 20 | 6 | T29 | 220 | 76,819 |
| (United States) Kevin Stadler* | 13 | 228,001 | 33 | 15 | T9 | 168 | 367,775 |
| (Australia) Euan Walters* | 14 | 213,554 | 18 | 2 | T62 | 230 | 46,365 |
| (United States) Darron Stiles | 15 | 212,894 | 26 | 14 | T9 (twice) | 143 | 499,827 |
| (United States) Hunter Haas | 16 | 212,065 | 28 | 14 | T10 | 166 | 371,925 |
| (United States) Scott Gutschewski* | 17 | 206,308 | 27 | 16 | T13 | 149 | 485,487 |
| (United States) Chris Anderson | 18 | 203,794 | 25 | 9 | T9 | 181 | 270,347 |
| (New Zealand) Michael Long | 19 | 199,943 | 26 | 11 | T22 | 203 | 180,418 |
| (Australia) Gavin Coles | 20 | 198,683 | 22 | 13 | T7 | 169 | 359,523 |

*PGA Tour rookie for 2005.
T = Tied
Green background indicates the player retained his PGA Tour card for 2006 (finished inside the top 125).
Yellow background indicates the player did not retain his PGA Tour card for 2006, but retained conditional status (finished between 126–150).
Red background indicates the player did not retain his PGA Tour card for 2006 (finished outside the top 150).

== Runners-up on the PGA Tour in 2006 ==
| No. | Date | Player | Tournament | Winner | Winning score | Runner-up score |
|---|---|---|---|---|---|---|
| 1 | May 1 | (United States) James Driscoll lost in two-man playoff | Zurich Classic of New Orleans | (United States) Tim Petrovic | −13 (72-69-66-68=275) | −13 (68-71-66-70=275) |
| 2 | Jul 17 | (Australia) Brendan Jones | B.C. Open | (United States) Jason Bohn | −24 (64-68-66-66=264) | −23 (67-64-66-68=265) |

== See also ==
- 2004 PGA Tour Qualifying School graduates
