= Kris Blanks =

American professional golfer (born 1972)

Personal information
- Full name: Kristoffer Douglas Blanks
- Nationality: United States
- Born: November 3, 1972 (age 53) Warner Robins, Georgia, U.S.
- Height: 5 ft 10 in (1.78 m)
- Weight: 220 lb (100 kg; 16 st)

Career
- Sport: Golf
- College: Huntingdon College
- Turned professional: 1995
- Former tours: PGA Tour; Web.com Tour; NGA Hooters Tour
- Professional wins: 5

Number of wins by tour
- Korn Ferry Tour: 2
- Other: 3

Best results in major championships
- Masters Tournament: DNP
- PGA Championship: CUT: 2010
- U.S. Open: DNP
- The Open Championship: DNP

Kristoffer Douglas Blanks (born November 3, 1972) is an American professional golfer who currently plays on the PGA Tour and previously played on the Nationwide Tour.

== Early life and amateur career ==
Blanks was born in Warner Robins, Georgia. He attended Huntingdon College.

== Professional career ==
Blanks played on the Nationwide Tour in 2005, 2007, and 2008. His best finish was a win at the 2008 Bank of America Open. In 2008, he finished 13th on the Nationwide Tour Money List and thus earned his PGA Tour card for 2009 for finishing in the top 25.

He has played on the PGA Tour since 2009. He finished in second place at the 2010 Puerto Rico Open. In 2011, he finished the RBC Canadian Open in a tie with Sean O'Hair and went on to lose the sudden death playoff to finish second.

Blanks was arrested on June 30, 2013 after he attempted to carry a gun on board a plane at Palm Beach International Airport. The charges were later dropped.

In March 2014, Blanks won his second event on the Web.com Tour with a sudden death playoff victory at the Chitimacha Louisiana Open over Brett Stegmaier.

== Professional wins (5) ==
=== Web.com Tour wins (2) ===
No.	Date	Tournament	Winning score	Margin of victory	Runner-up
1	Jun 1, 2008	Bank of America Open	−16 (65-70-69-68=272)	1 stroke	(United States) Bob May
2	Mar 30, 2014	Chitimacha Louisiana Open	−14 (71-66-71-62=270)	Playoff	(United States) Brett Stegmaier

Web.com Tour playoff record (1–0)

No.	Year	Tournament	Opponent	Result
1	2014	Chitimacha Louisiana Open	(United States) Brett Stegmaier	Won with birdie on third extra hole

=== NGA Hooters Tour wins (3) ===
No.	Date	Tournament	Winning score	Margin of victory	Runner-up
1	Jun 27, 2004	First City Classic	−18 (65-63-70-68=266)	Playoff	(United States) Josh Broadaway
2	Apr 23, 2006	Savannah Lakes Resort Classic	−22 (67-68-67-64=266)	4 strokes	(United States) Tommy Biershenk
3	Jul 16, 2006	Olde Oaks Classic	−21 (65-68-69-65=267)	Playoff	(United States) Theodore Potter

== Playoff record ==
PGA Tour playoff record (0–1)

No.	Year	Tournament	Opponent	Result
1	2011	RBC Canadian Open	(United States) Sean O'Hair	Lost to bogey on first extra hole

== Results in major championships ==
Tournament	2010
Masters Tournament	
U.S. Open	
The Open Championship	
PGA Championship	CUT

Did not play

CUT = missed the half-way cut

== See also ==
- 2008 Nationwide Tour graduates
- 2009 PGA Tour Qualifying School graduates
- 2012 PGA Tour Qualifying School graduates
