= Nationwide Tour Players Cup =

Tournament information
- Location: Bridgeport, West Virginia
- Established: 2004
- Course: Pete Dye Golf Club
- Par: 72
- Length: 7,308 yards (6,682 m)
- Tour: Nationwide Tour
- Format: Stroke play
- Prize fund: US$600,000
- Month played: June
- Final year: 2009

Tournament record score
- Aggregate: 265 D. A. Points (2004)
- To par: −23 as above

Final champion
- (United States) Tom Gillis
- Location in the United States Location in West Virginia

The Nationwide Tour Players Cup was a regular golf tournament on the Nationwide Tour from 2004 to 2009. It was played annually at the Pete Dye Golf Club in Bridgeport, West Virginia, United States. The tournament was founded in 2004 as the Pete Dye West Virginia Classic.

The 2009 purse was $600,000, with $108,000 going to the winner. Also in 2008 and 2009, the field consisted of the top 144 players on the Nationwide Tour money list.

== Winners ==
Year	Winner	Score	To par	Margin of victory	Runner(s)-up
Nationwide Tour Players Cup
2009	(United States) Tom Gillis	273	−15	3 strokes	(Australia) Cameron Percy (United States) Roger Tambellini
2008	(United States) Rick Price	273	−15	Playoff	(United States) Chris Anderson
National Mining Association Pete Dye Classic
2007	(United States) Jimmy Walker	273	−15	1 stroke	(United States) Justin Hicks (Australia) Matt Jones
2006	(United States) Jason Enloe	274	−14	Playoff	(United States) Boo Weekley
2005	(United States) Jason Gore	271	−17	1 stroke	(United States) Doug LaBelle II
Pete Dye West Virginia Classic
2004	(United States) D. A. Points	265	−23	5 strokes	(United States) Nick Cassini
