= 2009 Nationwide Tour =

Golf tour season

2009 Nationwide Tour season
- Duration: February 5, 2009 – October 25, 2009
- Number of official events: 29
- Most wins: (Australia) Michael Sim (3)
- Money list: (Australia) Michael Sim
- Player of the Year: (Australia) Michael Sim

The 2009 Nationwide Tour was the 20th season of the Nationwide Tour, the official development tour to the PGA Tour.

== Schedule ==
The following table lists official events during the 2009 season.

Date	Tournament	Location	Purse (US$)	Winner (Note: The number in parentheses after each winner's name is the number of Nationwide Tour events they had won up to and including that tournament. This information is only shown for Nationwide Tour members. It is rare for someone to accumulate many wins on the Nationwide Tour as success at this level usually leads to promotion to the PGA Tour.)	OWGR points	Other tours (Note: ANZ − PGA Tour of Australasia.)	Notes
Feb 8	Panama Digicel Championship	Panama	600,000	(United States) Vance Veazey (4)	14		
Mar 1	Moonah Classic	Australia	600,000	(Australia) Alistair Presnell (1)	16	ANZ	
Mar 8	HSBC New Zealand PGA Championship	New Zealand	600,000	(New Zealand) Steven Alker (2)	16	ANZ	
Mar 15	Michael Hill New Zealand Open	New Zealand	600,000	(United States) Alex Prugh (1)	16	ANZ	New to Nationwide Tour
Mar 29	Chitimacha Louisiana Open	Louisiana	550,000	(United States) Bubba Dickerson (1)	14		
Apr 5	Stonebrae Classic	California	600,000	(Australia) Michael Sim (2)	14		New tournament
Apr 19	Athens Regional Foundation Classic	Georgia	550,000	(United States) Patrick Sheehan (2)	14		
Apr 26	South Georgia Classic	Georgia	625,000	(South Africa) Garth Mulroy (1)	14		
May 17	BMW Charity Pro-Am	South Carolina	700,000	(Australia) Michael Sim (3)	14		Pro-Am
May 31	Rex Hospital Open	North Carolina	525,000	(United States) Kevin Johnson (5)	14		
Jun 7	Melwood Prince George's County Open	Maryland	675,000	(Sweden) Mathias Grönberg (1)	14		
Jun 14	Knoxville Open	Tennessee	525,000	(United States) Kevin Johnson (6)	14		
Jun 21	Fort Smith Classic	Arkansas	550,000	(United States) Jason Enloe (2)	14		
Jun 28	Nationwide Tour Players Cup	West Virginia	600,000	(United States) Tom Gillis (1)	14		
Jul 12	Ford Wayne Gretzky Classic	Canada	800,099	(United States) Roger Tambellini (3)	14		
Jul 26	Cox Classic	Nebraska	725,000	(United States) Rich Barcelo (1)	14		
Aug 2	Nationwide Children's Hospital Invitational	Ohio	775,000	(United States) Derek Lamely (1)	14		
Aug 9	Preferred Health Systems Wichita Open	Kansas	550,000	(United States) Chris Tidland (2)	14		
Aug 16	Price Cutter Charity Championship	Missouri	625,000	(United States) Justin Bolli (3)	14		
Aug 23	Christmas in October Classic	Kansas	625,000	(Australia) Michael Sim (4) (Note: Sim earned immediate promotion to the PGA Tour, as this was his third win of the season.)	14		New tournament
Aug 30	Northeast Pennsylvania Classic	Pennsylvania	525,000	(England) Gary Christian (1)	14		
Sep 6 (Note: Rescheduled due to the swine flu pandemic in Mexico.); ~~May 24~~	Mexico Open	Mexico	650,000	(United States) Troy Merritt (1)	14		
Sep 13	Utah Championship	Utah	550,000	(United States) Josh Teater (1)	14		
Sep 20	Albertsons Boise Open	Idaho	725,000	(United States) Fran Quinn (3)	14		
Sep 27	WNB Golf Classic	Texas	525,000	(United States) Garrett Willis (2)	14		
Oct 4	Soboba Classic	California	1,000,000	(United States) Jerod Turner (1)	14		New tournament
Oct 11	Chattanooga Classic	Tennessee	500,000	(Canada) Chris Baryla (1)	14		
Oct 18	Miccosukee Championship	Florida	625,000	(United States) Chad Collins (2)	14		
Oct 25	Nationwide Tour Championship	South Carolina	1,000,000	(United States) Matt Every (1)	20		Tour Championship

== Money list ==
The money list was based on prize money won during the season, calculated in U.S. dollars. The top 25 players on the money list earned status to play on the 2010 PGA Tour.

Position	Player	Prize money ($)
1	(Australia) Michael Sim	644,142
2	(United States) Chad Collins	415,114
3	(United States) Blake Adams	399,749
4	(United States) Derek Lamely	374,998
5	(United States) Tom Gillis	364,529

== Awards ==
Award	Winner	Ref.
Player of the Year (Jack Nicklaus Trophy)	(Australia) Michael Sim	
