= Xerox Classic =

Tournament information
- Location: Rochester, New York
- Established: 2005
- Course: Irondequoit Country Club
- Par: 70
- Length: 6,792 yards (6,211 m)
- Tour: Nationwide Tour
- Format: Stroke play
- Prize fund: US$600,000
- Month played: August
- Final year: 2008

Tournament record score
- Aggregate: 267 Brendon de Jonge (2008)
- To par: −13 as above

Current champion
- (Zimbabwe) Brendon de Jonge

Final champion
- Location in the United States Location in New York

The Xerox Classic was a golf tournament on the Nationwide Tour from 2005 to 2008. It was played in August at Irondequoit Country Club in Rochester, New York, United States.

The 2008 purse was $600,000, with $108,000 going to the winner.

== Winners ==
Year	Winner	Score	To par	Margin of victory	Runner-up
2008	(Zimbabwe) Brendon de Jonge	267	−13	4 strokes	(Australia) Jarrod Lyle
2007	(Australia) Nick Flanagan	270	−10	1 stroke	(United States) James Driscoll
2006	(United States) Kevin Stadler	271	−9	1 stroke	(United States) Glen Day
2005	(United States) Rick Price	269	−11	1 stroke	(United States) Andrew Pratt
