= Kevin Stadler =

American professional golfer (born 1980)

Personal information
- Full name: Kevin Stadler
- Nickname: Smallrus
- Nationality: United States
- Born: February 5, 1980 (age 46) Reno, Nevada, U.S.
- Height: 5 ft 10 in (1.78 m)
- Weight: 250 lb (110 kg; 18 st)

Career
- Sport: Golf
- College: University of Southern California
- Turned professional: 2002
- Current tour: PGA Tour
- Former tours: European Tour; PGA Tour of Australasia
- Professional wins: 9
- Highest ranking: 52 (April 27, 2014)

Number of wins by tour
- PGA Tour: 1
- European Tour: 1
- Asian Tour: 1
- PGA Tour of Australasia: 1
- Korn Ferry Tour: 4
- Challenge Tour: 1
- Other: 2

Best results in major championships
- Masters Tournament: T8: 2014
- PGA Championship: T64: 2014
- U.S. Open: T63: 2014
- The Open Championship: T39: 2014

Kevin Stadler (born February 5, 1980) is an American professional golfer who plays on the PGA Tour and formerly on the European Tour.

== Early life and amateur career ==
Stadler, the son of former Masters champion and 13-time PGA Tour winner Craig Stadler and Susan Barrett, was born in Reno, Nevada. He moved with his family to Denver, Colorado, where he attended Kent Denver School, excelling on the school's golf team. In 2002, he graduated from the University of Southern California.

== Professional career ==
In 2002, Stadler turned pro. In 2004, Stadler won twice on the second-tier Nationwide Tour, and finished 13th on the money list to win a place on the 2005 PGA Tour. In his rookie season on the elite tour he came 168th on the money list, thus losing his playing status.

Early in 2006 Stadler won the Johnnie Walker Classic in Australia, gaining a two-year exemption on the European, Asian, and Australasian tours. Stadler commented, "I am honestly baffled by this win.... It was my intention this year just to play the Nationwide Tour and get my PGA Tour card back but now I have no idea what I will do". His dilemma was that the European Tour, on which he became eligible to play, is much more prestigious and lucrative than the Nationwide Tour, but unlike the Nationwide Tour it did not offer a direct route to his objective of regaining his playing privileges on the PGA Tour. For the remainder of 2006 he divided his time between the two tours, winning twice on the Nationwide Tour, and finishing twelfth on the money list to regain his PGA Tour card with effect from the start of the 2007 season.

During the 2009 season Stadler lost in a playoff at the Wyndham Championship to Ryan Moore. At the time Moore and Stadler were both trying to capture their first PGA Tour title.

On February 2, 2014, Stadler won the Waste Management Phoenix Open marking his first PGA Tour victory. Stadler won after Bubba Watson made bogey on the 18th hole. The event was Stadler's 239th PGA Tour start and would ensure him of his first Masters invitation. Craig and Kevin were the first father-son duo to play at Augusta in the same tournament. Kevin is also the first son of a Masters champion to play in that tournament. Kevin is nicknamed as "Smallrus," a play on his father's nickname of "Walrus." Kevin finished T8 in his Masters debut, ensuring him of making the 2015 field. He missed the cut in 2015. His career-best world ranking was 52nd in 2014.

Stadler was one of the few golfers to employ the use of an anchor putter, which the PGA Tour banned on January 1, 2016. In preparation for the ban, Stadler started putting left-handed.

A broken bone in his left hand limited Stadler to five events during the 2014−15 season. Stadler attempted a comeback on the Web.com Tour's Digital Ally Open in 2017, but he withdrew after the first round. He entered the 2017–18 season with a Major Medical Extension that required him to earn 454.420 FedEx Cup points or $717,890 in 26 starts in order to retain his PGA Tour privileges, but was unable to meet the terms.

== Amateur wins ==
- 1997 Doug Sanders Junior World Championship

== Professional wins (9) ==
=== PGA Tour wins (1) ===
No.	Date	Tournament	Winning score	Margin of victory	Runners-up
1	Feb 2, 2014	Waste Management Phoenix Open	−16 (65-68-67-68=268)	1 stroke	(Canada) Graham DeLaet, (United States) Bubba Watson

PGA Tour playoff record (0–1)

No.	Year	Tournament	Opponents	Result
1	2009	Wyndham Championship	(United States) Jason Bohn, (United States) Ryan Moore	Moore won with birdie on third extra hole Bohn eliminated by par on first hole

=== European Tour wins (1) ===
No.	Date	Tournament	Winning score	Margin of victory	Runner-up
1	Feb 12, 2006	Johnnie Walker Classic^{1}	−20 (64-69-66-69=268)	2 strokes	(Australia) Nick O'Hern

^{1}Co-sanctioned with the Asian Tour and the PGA Tour of Australasia

=== Nationwide Tour wins (4) ===
No.	Date	Tournament	Winning score	Margin of victory	Runner(s)-up
1	Jun 27, 2004	Lake Erie Charity Classic	−9 (66-70-69-74=279)	Playoff	(New Zealand) Michael Long, (United States) Bubba Watson
2	Jul 11, 2004	Scholarship America Showdown	−11 (69-65-67-68=269)	Playoff	(Australia) Mathew Goggin, (United States) Kyle Thompson, (United States) Chris Tidland
3	Aug 13, 2006	Xerox Classic	−9 (69-68-69-65=271)	1 stroke	(United States) Glen Day
4	Sep 17, 2006	Albertsons Boise Open	−20 (64-64-70-66=264)	1 stroke	(United States) Glen Day

Nationwide Tour playoff record (2–0)

No.	Year	Tournament	Opponents	Result
1	2004	Lake Erie Charity Classic	(New Zealand) Michael Long, (United States) Bubba Watson	Won with par on fourth extra hole Long eliminated by par on first hole
2	2004	Scholarship America Showdown	(Australia) Mathew Goggin, (United States) Kyle Thompson, (United States) Chris Tidland	Won with birdie on third extra hole Thompson eliminated by par on second hole Goggin eliminated by par on first hole

=== Challenge Tour wins (1) ===
No.	Date	Tournament	Winning score	Margin of victory	Runner-up
1	Dec 11, 2005 (2006 season)	Abierto Visa de la República^{1}	−6 (69-66-67-72=274)	2 strokes	(Argentina) Ángel Cabrera

^{1}Co-sanctioned by the Tour de las Américas and the PGA of Argentina Tour

=== Other wins (2) ===
No.	Date	Tournament	Winning score	Margin of victory	Runners-up
1	Sep 1, 2002	Colorado Open	−8 (276)	Playoff	(United States) Gary Hallberg, (United States) Brian Kortan
2	Dec 15, 2002	Office Depot Father/Son Challenge (with father Craig Stadler)	−24 (60-60=120)	Playoff	(United States) Hale Irwin and son Steve Irwin

Other playoff record (2–0)

No.	Year	Tournament	Opponents	Result
1	2002	Colorado Open	(United States) Gary Hallberg, (United States) Brian Kortan	Won with birdie on first extra hole
2	2002	Office Depot Father/Son Challenge (with father Craig Stadler)	(United States) Hale Irwin and son Steve Irwin	Won with birdie on first extra hole

== Results in major championships ==
Tournament	2004	2005	2006	2007	2008	2009	2010	2011	2012	2013	2014	2015
Masters Tournament											T8	CUT
U.S. Open	65		CUT								T63	
The Open Championship				T51	T58						T39	
PGA Championship							CUT			CUT	T64	

Top 10
Did not play

CUT = missed the half-way cut
"T" = tied

== Results in The Players Championship ==
Tournament	2008	2009	2010	2011	2012	2013	2014
The Players Championship	T15		T58	CUT	T25	CUT	CUT

Did not play

CUT = missed the halfway cut
"T" indicates a tie for a place

== Results in World Golf Championships ==
Tournament	2006	2007	2008	2009	2010	2011	2012	2013	2014
Match Play									R64
Championship		T68							T47
Invitational	T13								T19
Champions									WD

Did not play

QF, R16, R32, R64 = Round in which player lost in match play
WD = withdrew
"T" = Tied
Note that the HSBC Champions did not become a WGC event until 2009.

== See also ==
- 2004 Nationwide Tour graduates
- 2006 Nationwide Tour graduates
- List of golfers with most Web.com Tour wins
