= Brad Ott =

American golfer (born 1969)

Personal information
- Full name: Bradley Howell Ott
- Nationality: United States
- Born: December 29, 1969 (age 56) Dallas, Texas, U.S.
- Height: 6 ft 0 in (1.83 m)
- Weight: 175 lb (79 kg; 12.5 st)

Career
- Sport: Golf
- College: Paris Junior College; Texas Tech University
- Turned professional: 1993
- Former tours: Sunshine Tour; Nationwide Tour; Hooters Tour; Golden Bear Tour
- Professional wins: 13

Number of wins by tour
- Sunshine Tour: 1
- Korn Ferry Tour: 1
- Other: 11

Best results in major championships
- Masters Tournament: DNP
- PGA Championship: CUT: 2016
- U.S. Open: DNP
- The Open Championship: DNP

Bradley Howell Ott (born December 29, 1969) is an American professional golfer who played on the Nationwide Tour.

== Career ==
In 1996, Ott joined the Nike Tour. In his rookie season he recorded three top-10 finishes including a runner-up finish. He then took a hiatus from the Tour and rejoined in 2002. In his return to the Tour he recorded two top-10 finished and a runner-up finish. He picked up his first win on Tour in 2004 at the Price Cutter Charity Championship. He played on the Nationwide Tour until 2008, never reaching the PGA Tour.

Ott played on the Sunshine Tour in 1995 and 1996 and won the 1995 Hollard Royal Swazi Sun Classic. He has won tournaments on the Hooters Tour, Tight Lies Tour, Golden Bear Tour, Teardrop Tour, Ironman Tour, Mid-Atlantic Tour, and Maverick Tour.

After Ott's touring career ended, he became a club professional. He earned entry into the 2016 PGA Championship through his finish at the PGA Professional National Championship. He is the director of instruction at TPC Craig Ranch and plays out of the Northern Texas section of the PGA.

== Amateur wins ==
- ???? Tri-State Amateur Championship

== Professional wins (13) ==
=== Sunshine Tour wins (1) ===
| No. | Date | Tournament | Winning score | Margin of victory | Runners-up |
|---|---|---|---|---|---|
| 1 | Jan 29, 1995 | Hollard Royal Swazi Sun Classic | −22 (67-67-67-65=266) | 2 strokes | (England) Chris Davison, (South Africa) Richard Kaplan |

=== Nationwide Tour wins (1) ===
| No. | Date | Tournament | Winning score | Margin of victory | Runner-up |
|---|---|---|---|---|---|
| 1 | Aug 15, 2004 | Price Cutter Charity Championship | −25 (65-66-68-64=263) | 1 stroke | (United States) Brandt Snedeker |

=== Hooters Tour wins (1) ===
| No. | Date | Tournament | Winning score | Margin of victory | Runner-up |
|---|---|---|---|---|---|
| 1 | Apr 23, 1995 | Coca-Cola Classic | −14 (62-68=130) (Note: Shortened to 36 holes due to weather.) | | |

=== Golden Bear Tour wins (1) ===
| No. | Date | Tournament | Winning score | Margin of victory | Runners-up |
|---|---|---|---|---|---|
| 1 | Sep 7, 2001 | Publix/Aquafina Classic | −14 (67-68-71-68=274) | 2 strokes | (United States) Pleasant Hughes, (United States) Chris Kaufman, (United States) Kris Maffet |

=== Other wins (9) ===
- 1994 Indian Creek Classic (Tight Lies Tour), CompUSA Classic @ Riverchase (Tight Lies Tour)
- 1995 Southwest Kansas Pro-Am
- 1999 Kingwood Classic (Teardrop Tour)
- 5 wins on the Ironman Tour, Mid-Atlantic Tour, Maverick Tour.

== Results in major championships ==
| Tournament | 2016 |
|---|---|
| PGA Championship | CUT |

CUT = missed the halfway cut
Note: Ott only played in the PGA Championship.
