= Showdown at Somerby =

Golf tournament

Rochester Area Charities Showdown
Tournament information
- Location: Byron, Minnesota
- Established: 2004
- Course: Somerby Golf Club
- Par: 72
- Length: 7,209 yards (6,592 m)
- Tour: Nationwide Tour
- Format: Stroke play
- Prize fund: US$500,000
- Month played: June
- Final year: 2007

Tournament record score
- Aggregate: 266 Jason Gore (2005)
- To par: −16 Jeff Quinney (2006) −16 Brandt Snedeker (2006) −16 Jamie Lovemark (2007) −16 Chris Riley (2007)

Final champion
- (United States) Chris Riley
- Location in the United States Location in Minnesota

The Showdown at Somerby was a regular golf tournament on the Nationwide Tour. It was played at Troy Burne Golf Club in Hudson, Wisconsin in 2004 and 2005 and moved to the Somerby Golf Club in Byron, Minnesota for 2006 and 2007. It was cancelled after four years because of a lack of corporate sponsorship.

The title sponsor from 2004 to 2006 was Scholarship America, which is a nonprofit, 501(c)(3) charity that is the largest provider of scholarships for postsecondary education in the country. The presenting sponsor for the 2007 tournament was Think Mutual Bank.

The 2007 purse was $500,000, with $90,000 going to the winner.

== Winners ==
Year	Winner	Score	To par	Margin of victory	Runner(s)-up
Rochester Area Charities Showdown
2007	(United States) Chris Riley	272	−16	Playoff	(United States) Jamie Lovemark (a)
Scholarship America Showdown
2006	(United States) Brandt Snedeker	272	−16	Playoff	(United States) Jeff Quinney
2005	(United States) Jason Gore	266	−14	4 strokes	(United States) Bill Haas
2004	(United States) Kevin Stadler	269	−11	Playoff	(Australia) Mathew Goggin (United States) Kyle Thompson (United States) Chris Tidland
