= Tom Gillis =

American professional golfer (born 1968)

Personal information
- Full name: Thomas Charles Gillis
- Nickname: Gilly
- Nationality: United States
- Born: July 16, 1968 (age 58) Pontiac, Michigan, U.S.
- Height: 6 ft 0 in (1.83 m)
- Weight: 200 lb (91 kg; 14 st)
- Spouse: Jennifer
- Children: 2

Career
- Sport: Golf
- College: Oakland Community College; Coastal Carolina University
- Turned professional: 1990
- Current tour: PGA Tour Champions
- Former tours: PGA Tour; European Tour; Nationwide Tour; NGA Hooters Tour; Gateway Tour eGolf Professional Tour
- Professional wins: 10
- Highest ranking: 99 (February 13, 2011)

Number of wins by tour
- Korn Ferry Tour: 1
- Other: 9

Best results in major championships
- Masters Tournament: DNP
- PGA Championship: CUT: 2011
- U.S. Open: T70: 2002
- The Open Championship: T58: 2008

Thomas Charles Gillis (born July 16, 1968) is an American professional golfer.

== Early life and amateur career ==
In 1968, Gillis was born in Pontiac, Michigan and graduated from Lake Orion High School in Lake Orion, Michigan. Gillis later played collegiate golf at Oakland Community College and Coastal Carolina University.

== Professional career ==
In 1990, Gillis turned professional. He played on the PGA Tour in 2010 after several years on the Nationwide Tour, and having previously competed on the PGA Tour in 2003 and 2005, and the European Tour from 1998 to 2002. He also played in several PGA and Nationwide Tour events during the 1990s. According to his profile, Gillis has played professional tournaments in 26 different countries.

Gillis won his first title on the Nationwide Tour at the 2009 Nationwide Tour Players Cup. He finished 5th on the money list to earn his 2010 PGA Tour card. In 2010, Gillis finished tied for fifth at the Deutsche Bank Championship. He retained his playing rights for the 2011 season, finishing 76th on the money list. He spent 2014 on the Web.com Tour, but a strong performance in the Finals earned him a place on the PGA Tour for 2015.

His best career finishes are a tie for second at the 2012 Honda Classic and a playoff loss to Jordan Spieth at the 2015 John Deere Classic.

In between the time of playing on the PGA Tour, and switching to the PGA Tour Champions, Gillis spent a year coaching high school golf. He coached the varsity team at Pontiac Notre Dame Prep. In 2018, Gillis began playing on the PGA Tour Champions. In his first event, the 3M Championship, he shot 67-67-67 to finish in a tie for 3rd.

== Professional wins (10) ==
=== Nationwide Tour wins (1) ===
No.	Date	Tournament	Winning score	Margin of victory	Runners-up
1	Jun 28, 2009	Nationwide Tour Players Cup	−15 (71-66-66-70=273)	3 strokes	(Australia) Cameron Percy, (United States) Roger Tambellini

=== NGA Hooters Tour wins (1) ===
No.	Date	Tournament	Winning score	Margin of victory	Runners-up
1	Sep 28, 1997	Naturally Fresh Cup	−9 (70-65=135) (Note: Shortened to 36 holes due to weather.)	1 stroke	(United States) B. J. Dekreek, (United States) Kyle Owen, (United States) Jay Hobby

=== Gateway Tour wins (2) ===
No.	Date	Tournament	Winning score	Margin of victory	Runner(s)-up
1	Apr 18, 2007	Beach Spring 4	−13 (69-67-67=203)	7 strokes	(United States) Chad Couch, (United States) Kyle Dobbs, (United States) Jeff Freeman, (United States) Jack Lander, (United States) Jeff Schmid
2	Jul 26, 2007	Beach Summer 7	−20 (66-69-67-66=268)	Playoff	(United States) Steve LeBrun

=== eGolf Professional Tour wins (2) ===
No.	Date	Tournament	Winning score	Margin of victory	Runner(s)-up
1	Mar 20, 2009	Pine Needles Classic	−7 (69-67-68=204)	Playoff	(United States) Michael Henderson, (United States) Chris Kirk, (United States) Emmett Turner
2	Apr 4, 2009	Savannah Quarters Championship	−17 (63-64=127)	7 strokes	(United States) Matt Hendrix

=== Other wins (4) ===
- 1992 Waterloo Open Golf Classic
- 1993 Jamaican Open
- 1994 Michigan Open
- 2008 Michigan Open

== Playoff record ==
PGA Tour playoff record (0–1)

No.	Year	Tournament	Opponent	Result
1	2015	John Deere Classic	(United States) Jordan Spieth	Lost to par on second extra hole

== Results in major championships ==
Tournament	1999	2000	2001	2002	2003	2004	2005	2006	2007	2008	2009
U.S. Open				T70	CUT				CUT		
The Open Championship	WD									T58	
PGA Championship											

Tournament	2010	2011	2012	2013	2014	2015
U.S. Open						
The Open Championship						CUT
PGA Championship		CUT				

Did not play

CUT = missed the half-way cut
WD = Withdrew
"T" = tied
Note: Gillis never played in the Masters Tournament.

== Results in The Players Championship ==
Tournament	2005	2006	2007	2008	2009	2010	2011	2012	2013
The Players Championship	CUT							T35	CUT

Did not play

CUT = missed the half-way cut
"T" = tied

== Results in senior major championships ==
Tournament	2019	2020	2021	2022	2023	2024
The Tradition	WD	NT	T39			
Senior PGA Championship	WD	NT	T34	CUT	T70	T49
U.S. Senior Open		NT		T41	17	
Senior Players Championship	T57	T10	T47	T69		
Senior British Open Championship	T29	NT		T36	T14	T37

Top 10
Did not play

CUT = missed the halfway cut
WD = withdrew
"T" indicates a tie for a place
NT = No tournament due to COVID-19 pandemic

== See also ==
- 2002 PGA Tour Qualifying School graduates
- 2004 PGA Tour Qualifying School graduates
- 2009 Nationwide Tour graduates
- 2014 Web.com Tour Finals graduates
