= Fort Smith Classic =

Tournament information
- Location: Fort Smith, Arkansas
- Established: 1998
- Course: Hardscrabble Country Club
- Par: 70
- Length: 6,783 yards (6,202 m)
- Tour: Nationwide Tour
- Format: Stroke play
- Prize fund: US$525,000
- Month played: June
- Final year: 2010

Tournament record score
- Aggregate: 260 Mark Hensby (1998)
- To par: −20 as above

Final champion
- (United States) Chris Kirk
- Location in the United States Location in Arkansas

The Fort Smith Classic was a golf tournament on the Nationwide Tour. It is held each year at Hardscrabble Country Club in Fort Smith, Arkansas. It was the only annual PGA Tour event in the U.S. state of Arkansas.

== History ==
The 2010 purse was a record $525,000, with $94,500 going to the winner.

The tournament was founded in 1998. Mark Hensby won the inaugural tournament at 20-under par, which is still the record low score. In 2005, Chris Couch tied the course record with a final round 60.

As of October 7, 2010, the Fort Smith Classic board notified the PGA Tour that they would not be renewing their contract for 2011.

== Winners ==
Year	Winner	Score	To par	Margin of victory	Runner(s)-up
Fort Smith Classic
2010	(United States) Chris Kirk	264	−16	1 stroke	(United States) Kyle Thompson
2009	(United States) Jason Enloe	265	−15	Playoff	(United States) Chris Tidland
2008	(United States) Colt Knost	268	−12	1 stroke	(United States) Darron Stiles
2007	(United States) Jay Williamson	264	−16	1 stroke	(United States) Justin Bolli (United States) Garrett Willis
Rheem Classic
2006	(United States) Darron Stiles	267	−13	Playoff	(United States) Michael Putnam
2005	(United States) Chris Couch	265	−15	5 strokes	(United States) Troy Matteson
2004	(United States) Franklin Langham	265	−15	2 strokes	(United States) Keoke Cotner
2003	(United States) Zach Johnson	272	−8	Playoff	(United States) Steve Haskins
Fort Smith Classic
2002	(United States) Todd Fischer	269	−11	1 stroke	(United States) Doug Barron (Australia) Gavin Coles (United States) Andy Sanders
Buy.com Fort Smith Classic
2001	(United States) Jay Delsing	263	−17	Playoff	(United States) Jeff Freeman
2000	(South Africa) Tim Clark	264	−16	3 strokes	(United States) Lee Rinker
Nike Fort Smith Classic
1999	(United States) Gary Webb	264	−16	1 stroke	(United States) Matt Peterson
1998	(Australia) Mark Hensby	260	−20	2 strokes	(United States) Woody Austin
