= Mark Wurtz =

American professional golfer (1964–2020)

Personal information
- Nationality: United States
- Born: October 31, 1964 Yakima, Washington, U.S.
- Died: March 25, 2020 (aged 55) La Quinta, California, U.S.
- Height: 5 ft 10 in (1.78 m)
- Weight: 165 lb (75 kg; 11.8 st)

Career
- Sport: Golf
- College: University of New Mexico
- Turned professional: 1986
- Former tours: PGA Tour; Nationwide Tour; Canadian Tour
- Professional wins: 7

Number of wins by tour
- Korn Ferry Tour: 1
- Other: 6

Best results in major championships
- Masters Tournament: DNP
- PGA Championship: DNP
- U.S. Open: CUT: 1994, 2003
- The Open Championship: DNP

Mark Wurtz (October 31, 1964 – March 25, 2020) was an American professional golfer.

== Early life and amateur career ==
Wurtz was born in Yakima, Washington. He played college golf at the University of New Mexico.

== Professional career ==
In 1986, Wurtz turned pro. He played mini-tours and the Canadian Tour before earning his PGA Tour card for the 1994 season in Q School. Between 1994 and 2005, he played on both the PGA Tour and Nationwide Tour. On the PGA Tour (1994–95, 1998), his best finish was T-8 at the 1994 Motorola Western Open. On the Nationwide Tour (1996–97, 1999–2005), he won the 1997 Nike Shreveport Open.

== Death ==
Wurtz died at his home after a lengthy illness.

== Professional wins (7) ==
=== Buy.com Tour wins (1) ===
No.	Date	Tournament	Winning score	Margin of victory	Runner-up
1	Oct 12, 1997	Nike Shreveport Open	−13 (68-63-71-73=275)	1 stroke	(United States) Brian Kamm

Buy.com Tour playoff record (0–1)

No.	Year	Tournament	Opponents	Result
1	2001	Buy.com Inland Empire Open	(Australia) Rod Pampling, (United States) D. A. Points	Points won with birdie on third extra hole Wurtz eliminated by birdie on first hole

=== Canadian Tour wins (2) ===
No.	Date	Tournament	Winning score	Margin of victory	Runner(s)-up
1	Sep 15, 1991	Nissan Tournament Players Championship	−6 (73-67-69-73=282)	Playoff	(Canada) Rémi Bouchard
2	Jul 13, 1997	Xerox Manitoba Open	−8 (68-71-64-73=276)	2 strokes	(United States) Duane Bock, (United States) Perry Parker

=== Other wins (4) ===
- 1992 California State Open
- 1999 Giusti Open (Oregon)
- 2000 Giusti Open (Oregon
- 2001 Southern Arizona Open

== Results in major championships ==
Tournament	1994	1995	1996	1997	1998	1999	2000	2001	2002	2003	2004
U.S. Open	CUT										CUT

Did not play

CUT = missed the halfway cut
Note: Wurtz only played in the U.S. Open.

== See also ==
- 1993 PGA Tour Qualifying School graduates
- 1994 PGA Tour Qualifying School graduates
- 1997 PGA Tour Qualifying School graduates
