= Steve Haskins =

American professional golfer (born 1958)

Personal information
- Nationality: United States
- Born: November 13, 1958 (age 67) Groom, Texas, U.S.
- Height: 6 ft 2 in (1.88 m)
- Weight: 190 lb (86 kg; 14 st)

Career
- Sport: Golf
- College: New Mexico State University
- Turned professional: 1984
- Former tours: Nationwide Tour; U.S. Golf Tour; Champions Tour
- Professional wins: 9

Number of wins by tour
- Korn Ferry Tour: 2
- Other: 7

Best results in major championships
- Masters Tournament: DNP
- PGA Championship: DNP
- U.S. Open: CUT: 1988, 2002
- The Open Championship: DNP

Steve Haskins (born November 13, 1958) is an American professional golfer who played on the Nationwide Tour and Champions Tour.

== Early life ==
In 1958, Haskins was born in Groom, Texas. His father, Don, was a Hall of Fame basketball coach who led Texas Western College to the National Championship in 1966.

== Professional career ==
In 1984, Haskins turned professional. In 1990, Haskins joined the Nationwide Tour. He won his first title the following year at the Ben Hogan New England Classic. In 2001, he won his second event on Tour at the Buy.com Ozarks Open.

In 2010, Haskins joined the Champions Tour earning his card through the tour's qualifying school.

== Professional wins (9) ==
=== Nationwide Tour wins (2) ===
No.	Date	Tournament	Winning score	Margin of victory	Runner-up
1	Jun 30, 1991	Ben Hogan New England Classic	−9 (69-69-69=207)	1 stroke	(United States) Jeff Gallagher
2	Jul 29, 2001	Buy.com Ozarks Open	−13 (66-65=131) (Note: Shortened to 36 holes due to weather.)	1 stroke	(United States) Omar Uresti

Nationwide Tour playoff record (0–1)

No.	Year	Tournament	Opponent	Result
1	2003	Rheem Classic	(United States) Zach Johnson	Lost to birdie on first extra hole

=== U.S. Golf Tour wins (4) ===
No.	Date	Tournament	Winning score	Margin of victory	Runner(s)-up
1	Mar 20, 1988	Mobile Classic	−4 (70-72-69-69=280)	Playoff	(United States) Greg Cerulli
2	Jul 10, 1988	Coronado Invitational	−9 (62-68-71-70=271)	1 stroke	(United States) Pete Jordan
3	Apr 2, 1989	Laurel Tournament	−3 (70-73-73-69=285)	1 stroke	(United States) Greg Chapman, (South West Africa) Trevor Dodds, (United States) Mike Nicolette
4	Jul 30, 1989	High Plains Classic	−13 (69-69-67-70=275)		

=== Other wins (3) ===
- 1986 New Mexico Open
- 1989 Bogey Hills Invitational
- 2000 Panama Open

== Results in major championships ==
Tournament	1988	1989	1990	1991	1992	1993	1994	1995	1996	1997	1998	1999	2000	2001	2002
U.S. Open	CUT														CUT

Did not play

CUT = missed the half-way cut
Note: Haskins only played in the U.S. Open.
