= 2008 Nationwide Tour =

Golf tour season

2008 Nationwide Tour season
- Duration: January 24, 2008 – November 9, 2008
- Number of official events: 30
- Most wins: (United States) Matt Bettencourt (2) (United States) Colt Knost (2) (Australia) Jarrod Lyle (2) (United States) Scott Piercy (2)
- Money list: (United States) Matt Bettencourt
- Player of the Year: (Zimbabwe) Brendon de Jonge

The 2008 Nationwide Tour was the 19th season of the Nationwide Tour, the official development tour to the PGA Tour.

== Schedule ==
The following table lists official events during the 2008 season.

Date	Tournament	Location	Purse (US$)	Winner (Note: The number in parentheses after each winner's name is the number of Nationwide Tour events they had won up to and including that tournament. This information is only shown for Nationwide Tour members. It is rare for someone to accumulate many wins on the Nationwide Tour as success at this level usually leads to promotion to the PGA Tour.)	OWGR points	Other tours (Note: ANZ − PGA Tour of Australasia.)	Notes
Jan 27	Panama Movistar Championship	Panama	600,000	(United States) Scott Dunlap (2)	14		
Feb 3	Mexico Open	Mexico	625,000	(Australia) Jarrod Lyle (1)	14		New to Nationwide Tour
Feb 17	HSBC New Zealand PGA Championship	New Zealand	650,000	(United States) Darron Stiles (n/a)	12	ANZ	Unofficial win (Note: Shortened to 36 holes due to weather. Due to the event's length, this win is not officially recognized as a Nationwide Tour victory.)
Feb 24	Moonah Classic	Australia	750,000	(Australia) Ewan Porter (1)	16	ANZ	New tournament
Mar 30	Chitimacha Louisiana Open	Louisiana	525,000	(Australia) Gavin Coles (4)	14		
Apr 6	Livermore Valley Wine Country Championship	California	600,000	(Australia) Aron Price (1)	14		
Apr 20	Athens Regional Foundation Classic	Georgia	525,000	(United States) Robert Damron (1)	14		
Apr 27	Henrico County Open	Virginia	500,000	(Australia) Greg Chalmers (2)	14		
May 4	South Georgia Classic	Georgia	625,000	(Canada) Bryan DeCorso (1)	14		
May 11	Fort Smith Classic	Arkansas	550,000	(United States) Colt Knost (1)	14		
May 18	BMW Charity Pro-Am	South Carolina	675,000	(United States) David Mathis (1)	14		Pro-Am
May 25	Melwood Prince George's County Open	Maryland	650,000	(United States) Jeff Klauk (2)	14		
Jun 1	Bank of America Open	Illinois	750,000	(United States) Kris Blanks (1)	14		
Jun 8	Rex Hospital Open	North Carolina	500,000	(United States) Scott Gutschewski (2)	14		
Jun 22	Knoxville Open	Tennessee	500,000	(Australia) Jarrod Lyle (2)	14		
Jun 29	Ford Wayne Gretzky Classic	Canada	800,099	(United States) Justin Hicks (1)	14		New tournament
Jul 13	Nationwide Tour Players Cup	West Virginia	1,000,000	(United States) Rick Price (2)	14		
Jul 20	Price Cutter Charity Championship	Missouri	600,000	(United States) Colt Knost (2)	14		
Jul 27	Nationwide Children's Hospital Invitational	Ohio	750,000	(United States) Bill Lunde (1)	14		
Aug 3	Cox Classic	Nebraska	700,000	(United States) Ryan Hietala (2)	14		
Aug 10	Preferred Health Systems Wichita Open	Kansas	525,000	(United States) Scott Piercy (1)	14		
Aug 17	Xerox Classic	New York	600,000	(Zimbabwe) Brendon de Jonge (1)	14		
Aug 24	Northeast Pennsylvania Classic	Pennsylvania	525,000	(United States) Scott Piercy (2)	14		
Sep 7	Utah Championship	Utah	550,000	(United States) Brendon Todd (1)	14		
Sep 14	Albertsons Boise Open	Idaho	725,000	(United States) Chris Tidland (1)	14		
Sep 21	Oregon Classic	Oregon	500,000	(United States) Matt Bettencourt (1)	14		
Oct 12	WNB Golf Classic	Texas	525,000	(Australia) Marc Leishman (1)	14		
Oct 19	Chattanooga Classic	Tennessee	500,000	(India) Arjun Atwal (1)	14		
Oct 26	Miccosukee Championship	Florida	625,000	(United States) D. A. Points (4)	14		
Nov 9	Nationwide Tour Championship	Texas	1,000,000	(United States) Matt Bettencourt (2)	20		Tour Championship

== Money list ==
The money list was based on prize money won during the season, calculated in U.S. dollars. The top 25 players on the money list earned status to play on the 2009 PGA Tour.

Position	Player	Prize money ($)
1	(United States) Matt Bettencourt	447,863
2	(Zimbabwe) Brendon de Jonge	437,035
3	(United States) Jeff Klauk	407,418
4	(Australia) Jarrod Lyle	382,738
5	(United States) Bill Lunde	341,446

== Awards ==
Award	Winner	Ref.
Player of the Year (Jack Nicklaus Trophy)	(Zimbabwe) Brendon de Jonge	
