= 2006 Nationwide Tour =

Golf tour season

2006 Nationwide Tour season
- Duration: January 26, 2006 – November 12, 2006
- Number of official events: 31
- Most wins: (United States) Tripp Isenhour (2) (United States) Craig Kanada (2) (United States) Brandt Snedeker (2) (United States) Kevin Stadler (2) (United States) Johnson Wagner (2)
- Money list: (United States) Ken Duke
- Player of the Year: (United States) Ken Duke

The 2006 Nationwide Tour was the 17th season of the Nationwide Tour, the official development tour to the PGA Tour.

== OWGR points increase ==
In July 2005, the Official World Golf Ranking announced that the minimum points awarded to Nationwide Tour events, beginning in 2006, would be increased from 6 to 14.

== Schedule ==
The following table lists official events during the 2006 season.

Date	Tournament	Location	Purse (US$)	Winner (Note: The number in parentheses after each winner's name is the number of Nationwide Tour events they had won up to and including that tournament. This information is only shown for Nationwide Tour members. It is rare for someone to accumulate many wins on the Nationwide Tour as success at this level usually leads to promotion to the PGA Tour.)	OWGR points	Other tours (Note: ANZ − PGA Tour of Australasia.)	Notes
Jan 29	Movistar Panama Championship	Panama	550,000	(United States) Tripp Isenhour (3)	14		
Feb 19	Jacob's Creek Open Championship	Australia	A$1,000,000	(Australia) Paul Sheehan (1)	16	ANZ	
Feb 26	ING New Zealand PGA Championship	New Zealand	600,000	(Canada) Jim Rutledge (1)	16	ANZ	
Mar 26	Chitimacha Louisiana Open	Louisiana	500,000	(United States) Johnson Wagner (1)	14		
Apr 2	Livermore Valley Wine Country Championship	California	600,000	(United States) Tripp Isenhour (4)	14		New tournament
Apr 23	Athens Regional Foundation Classic	Georgia	500,000	(Australia) Paul Gow (3)	14		New tournament
Apr 30	BMW Charity Pro-Am	South Carolina	625,000	(United States) Ken Duke (1)	14		Pro-Am
May 7	Virginia Beach Open	Virginia	450,000	(Australia) Andrew Buckle (1)	14		
May 14	Rheem Classic	Arkansas	500,000	(United States) Darron Stiles (4)	14		
May 21	Henrico County Open	Virginia	450,000	(United States) Matt Kuchar (2)	14		
June 4	Rex Hospital Open	North Carolina	450,000	(South Africa) Brenden Pappas (1)	14		
June 11	LaSalle Bank Open	Illinois	750,000	(United States) Jason Dufner (2)	14		
June 18	Knoxville Open	Tennessee	475,000	(United States) Hunter Haas (2)	14		
June 25	Chattanooga Classic	Tennessee	475,000	(United States) Kyle Reifers (1)	14		
Jul 2	Peek'n Peak Classic	New York	560,000	(United States) John Merrick (1)	14		
Jul 16	Scholarship America Showdown	Minnesota	550,000	(United States) Brandt Snedeker (1)	14		
Jul 23	Price Cutter Charity Championship	Missouri	550,000	(United States) Doug LaBelle II (1)	14		
Jul 30	Preferred Health Systems Wichita Open	Kansas	500,000	(United States) Kevin Johnson (4)	14		
Aug 6	Cox Classic	Nebraska	650,000	(United States) Johnson Wagner (2)	14		
Aug 13	Xerox Classic	New York	575,000	(United States) Kevin Stadler (3)	14		
Aug 20	Northeast Pennsylvania Classic	Pennsylvania	475,000	(United States) Craig Bowden (3)	14		
Aug 27	National Mining Association Pete Dye Classic	West Virginia	600,000	(United States) Jason Enloe (1)	14		
Sep 3	Legend Financial Group Classic	Ohio	500,000	(Australia) Gavin Coles (3)	14		
Sep 10	Utah EnergySolutions Championship	Utah	475,000	(United States) Craig Kanada (1)	14		
Sep 17	Albertsons Boise Open	Idaho	650,000	(United States) Kevin Stadler (4)	14		
Sep 24	Oregon Classic	Oregon	450,000	(United States) Cliff Kresge (3)	14		
Oct 8	Mark Christopher Charity Classic	California	600,000	(United States) Kevin Na (1)	14		
Oct 15	Permian Basin Charity Golf Classic	Texas	475,000	(United States) Brandt Snedeker (2)	14		
Oct 22	PalmettoPride Classic	South Carolina	500,000	(Australia) Michael Sim (1)	14		New tournament
Oct 29	Miccosukee Championship	Florida	500,000	(United States) Bryce Molder (1)	14		
Nov 12	Nationwide Tour Championship	Texas	750,000	(United States) Craig Kanada (2)	20		

== Money list ==
The money list was based on prize money won during the season, calculated in U.S. dollars. The top 22 players on the money list earned status to play on the 2007 PGA Tour.

Position	Player	Prize money ($)
1	(United States) Ken Duke	382,443
2	(United States) Johnson Wagner	372,069
3	(United States) Cliff Kresge	339,763
4	(United States) Craig Bowden	334,671
5	(United States) Tripp Isenhour	321,996

== Awards ==
Award	Winner	Ref.
Player of the Year (Jack Nicklaus Trophy)	(United States) Ken Duke	
