= D. A. Points =

American professional golfer (born 1976)

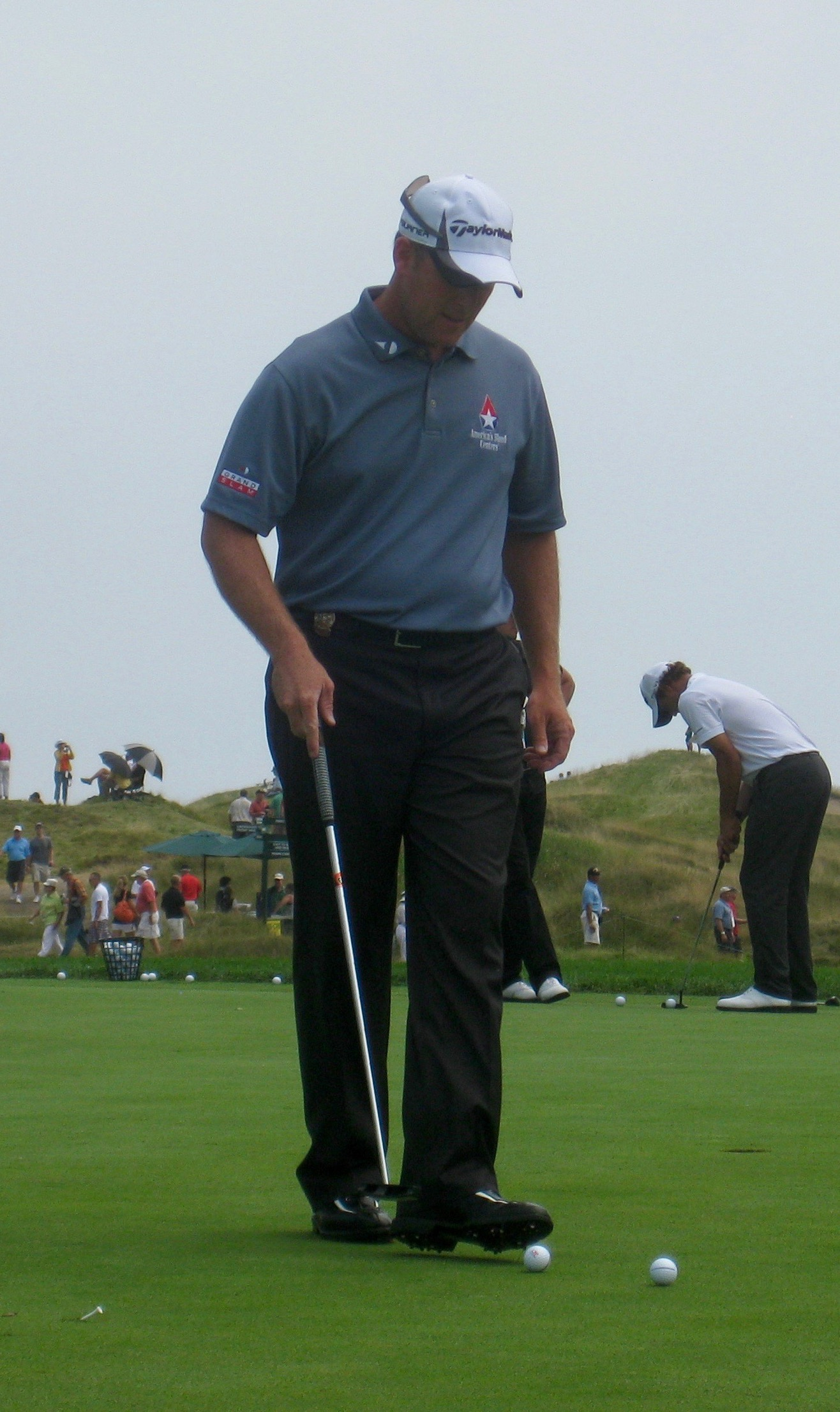
- Points at the 2010 PGA Championship

Personal information
- Full name: Darren Andrew Points
- Nationality: United States
- Born: December 1, 1976 (age 49) Pekin, Illinois, U.S.
- Height: 6 ft 1 in (1.85 m)
- Weight: 195 lb (88 kg; 13.9 st)
- Spouse: Lori Points

Career
- Sport: Golf
- College: University of Illinois
- Turned professional: 1999
- Current tours: PGA Tour (past champion status)
- Former tour: Web.com Tour
- Professional wins: 7
- Highest ranking: 45 (May 19, 2013)

Number of wins by tour
- PGA Tour: 3
- Korn Ferry Tour: 4

Best results in major championships
- Masters Tournament: T38: 2013
- PGA Championship: T10: 2011
- U.S. Open: T58: 2015
- The Open Championship: T32: 2014

Darren Andrew "D.A." Points (born December 1, 1976) is an American professional golfer who currently plays on the PGA Tour.

== Early years and amateur career ==
Born and raised in Pekin, Illinois, Points attended Pekin High School, and the University of Illinois, where he was a third team All-American. Points won the Illinois State Amateur Championship in 1995, 1998, and 1999. He lost to Tiger Woods in the quarterfinals of the U.S. Amateur in 1996. Points turned professional in 1999.

== Professional career ==
Points played on the Buy.com Tour (later Web.com Tour) from 2001 to 2004 and won three events: the 2001 Buy.com Inland Empire Open, the 2004 Northeast Pennsylvania Classic and the 2004 Pete Dye West Virginia Classic. He earned his PGA Tour card by finishing second on the Nationwide Tour money list in 2004. He played on the PGA Tour in 2005 and 2006, but dropped back to the Nationwide Tour for 2007 and 2008. At the Miccosukee Championship in 2008, he holed his second shot from the fairway on the last hole on Sunday with a wedge and ended up winning in a playoff over Matt Bettencourt for his fourth career win. He finished 16th on the money list to earn his PGA Tour card for 2009.

Points had his first successful year on the PGA Tour in 2009. He recorded four top-10 finishes, including a third-place finish at the HP Byron Nelson Championship en route to a 66th-place finish on the money list.

In February 2011, Points won his first PGA Tour title at the AT&T Pebble Beach National Pro-Am. He finished two strokes ahead of American Hunter Mahan, aided by an approach shot on the par-five 14th, which he holed for an eagle. He also won the pro-am portion with amateur partner Bill Murray. The victory helped him finish 37th on the money list, his best career finish to date. Points led the 2012 Wells Fargo Championship by one stroke over Rory McIlroy and Rickie Fowler going into the final hole of the tournament. He bogeyed the hole and they went to a sudden death playoff. Fowler won the playoff on the first extra hole with a birdie.

He won his second title on the PGA Tour in 2013 at the Shell Houston Open, sinking a 13-foot (4 m) putt on the 72nd hole to save par and win by a stroke. Points won again in 2017 at the Puerto Rico Open starting the last round with five straight birdies and shooting a final round 66 to take his third PGA Tour title.

Points has been featured in the top 50 of the Official World Golf Ranking.

== Amateur wins ==
- 1992 Junior PGA Championship
- 1995 Illinois Amateur
- 1998 Illinois Amateur, Legends of Indiana Intercollegiate
- 1999 Illinois Amateur

== Professional wins (7) ==
=== PGA Tour wins (3) ===
No.	Date	Tournament	Winning score	To par	Margin of victory	Runner(s)-up
1	Feb 13, 2011	AT&T Pebble Beach National Pro-Am	63-70-71-67=271	−15	2 strokes	(United States) Hunter Mahan
2	Mar 31, 2013	Shell Houston Open	64-71-71-66=272	−16	1 stroke	(United States) Billy Horschel, (Sweden) Henrik Stenson
3	Mar 26, 2017	Puerto Rico Open	64-69-69-66=268	−20	2 strokes	(United States) Bryson DeChambeau, (South Africa) Retief Goosen, (United States) Bill Lunde

PGA Tour playoff record (0–1)

No.	Year	Tournament	Opponents	Result
1	2012	Wells Fargo Championship	(United States) Rickie Fowler, (Northern Ireland) Rory McIlroy	Fowler won with birdie on first extra hole

=== Nationwide Tour wins (4) ===
No.	Date	Tournament	Winning score	To par	Margin of victory	Runner(s)-up
1	Sep 30, 2001	Buy.com Inland Empire Open	65-66-68-68=267	−21	Playoff	(Australia) Rod Pampling, (United States) Mark Wurtz
2	Jun 20, 2004	Northeast Pennsylvania Classic	67-66-71-66=270	−14	Playoff	(United States) James Driscoll
3	Jul 18, 2004	Pete Dye West Virginia Classic	65-62-68-70=265	−23	5 strokes	(United States) Nick Cassini
4	Oct 26, 2008	Miccosukee Championship	73-70-62-67=272	−12	Playoff	(United States) Matt Bettencourt

Nationwide Tour playoff record (3–0)

No.	Year	Tournament	Opponent(s)	Result
1	2001	Buy.com Inland Empire Open	(Australia) Rod Pampling, (United States) Mark Wurtz	Won with birdie on third extra hole Wurtz eliminated by birdie on first hole
2	2004	Northeast Pennsylvania Classic	(United States) James Driscoll	Won with par on first extra hole
3	2008	Miccosukee Championship	(United States) Matt Bettencourt	Won with birdie on first extra hole

== Results in major championships ==
Tournament	2008	2009	2010	2011	2012	2013	2014	2015	2016	2017
Masters Tournament				CUT		T38	CUT			
U.S. Open	T69			CUT	CUT	CUT	CUT	T58		
The Open Championship			CUT			CUT	T32			
PGA Championship			T16	T10	CUT	T40				T54

Top 10
Did not play

CUT = missed the half-way cut
"T" = tied

=== Summary ===
Tournament	Wins	2nd	3rd	Top-5	Top-10	Top-25	Events	Cuts made
Masters Tournament	0	0	0	0	0	0	3	1
U.S. Open	0	0	0	0	0	0	6	2
The Open Championship	0	0	0	0	0	0	3	1
PGA Championship	0	0	0	0	1	2	5	4
Totals	0	0	0	0	1	2	17	8

- Most consecutive cuts made – 3 (2014 Open Championship – 2017 PGA, current)
- Longest streak of top-10s – 1

== Results in The Players Championship ==
Tournament	2010	2011	2012	2013	2014	2015	2016	2017	2018
The Players Championship	CUT	CUT		T48	CUT			CUT	CUT

Did not play

CUT = missed the halfway cut
"T" indicates a tie for a place

== Results in World Golf Championships ==
Tournament	2011	2012	2013	2014
Match Play				
Championship	T45			T62
Invitational	T19		T59	
Champions	T66		T68	

Did not play

"T" = Tied

== See also ==
- 2004 Nationwide Tour graduates
- 2005 PGA Tour Qualifying School graduates
- 2008 Nationwide Tour graduates
- 2016 Web.com Tour Finals graduates
- List of golfers with most Web.com Tour wins
