= 2004 Nationwide Tour =

Golf tour season

2004 Nationwide Tour season
- Duration: February 5, 2004 – October 31, 2004
- Number of official events: 31
- Most wins: (Sweden) Daniel Chopra (2) (United States) D. A. Points (2) (United States) Kevin Stadler (2) (United States) Jimmy Walker (2) (United States) Charles Warren (2)
- Money list: (United States) Jimmy Walker
- Player of the Year: (United States) Jimmy Walker

The 2004 Nationwide Tour was the 15th season of the Nationwide Tour, the official development tour to the PGA Tour.

== Schedule ==
The following table lists official events during the 2004 season.

Date	Tournament	Location	Purse (US$)	Winner (Note: The number in parentheses after each winner's name is the number of Nationwide Tour events they had won up to and including that tournament. This information is only shown for Nationwide Tour members. It is rare for someone to accumulate many wins on the Nationwide Tour as success at this level usually leads to promotion to the PGA Tour.)	OWGR points	Other tours (Note: ANZ − PGA Tour of Australasia.)	Notes
Feb 8	BellSouth Panama Championship	Panama	500,000	(United States) Jimmy Walker (1)	6		New tournament
Feb 22	Jacob's Creek Open	Australia	700,000	(Australia) Euan Walters (1)	12	ANZ	
Feb 29	New Zealand PGA Championship	New Zealand	700,000	(Australia) Gavin Coles (2)	12	ANZ	
Mar 28	Chitimacha Louisiana Open	Louisiana	475,000	(United States) Jimmy Walker (2)	6		
Apr 18	First Tee Arkansas Classic	Arkansas	500,000	(Sweden) Daniel Chopra (1)	6		
Apr 25	Rheem Classic	Arkansas	475,000	(United States) Franklin Langham (2)	6		
May 2	BMW Charity Pro-Am	South Carolina	600,000	(Japan) Ryuji Imada (2)	6		Pro-Am
May 9	Chattanooga Classic	Tennessee	450,000	(United States) Justin Bolli (1)	6		
May 23	Henrico County Open	Virginia	450,000	(Sweden) Daniel Chopra (2)	6		
May 30	SAS Carolina Classic	North Carolina	525,000	(United States) Chris Anderson (1)	6		
Jun 6	Knoxville Open	Tennessee	475,000	(United States) Hunter Haas (1)	6		
Jun 13	LaSalle Bank Open	Illinois	600,000	(Australia) Brendan Jones (1)	6		
Jun 20	Northeast Pennsylvania Classic	Pennsylvania	450,000	(United States) D. A. Points (2)	6		
Jun 27	Lake Erie Charity Classic	New York	450,000	(United States) Kevin Stadler (1)	6		
Jul 4	Reese's Cup Classic	Pennsylvania	450,000	(United States) Ben Bates (2)	6		
Jul 11	Scholarship America Showdown	Wisconsin	475,000	(United States) Kevin Stadler (2)	6		New tournament
Jul 18	Pete Dye West Virginia Classic	West Virginia	600,000	(United States) D. A. Points (2)	6		New tournament
Jul 25	Samsung Canadian PGA Championship	Canada	450,000	(United States) Charles Warren (2)	6		
Aug 1	Preferred Health Systems Wichita Open	Kansas	475,000	(Australia) Bradley Hughes (1)	6		
Aug 8	Cox Classic	Nebraska	600,000	(United States) Charles Warren (3)	6		
Aug 15	Price Cutter Charity Championship	Missouri	525,000	(United States) Brad Ott (1)	6		
Aug 22	Alberta Classic	Canada	450,000	(Canada) David Hearn (1)	6		
Aug 29	Envirocare Utah Classic	Utah	450,000	(United States) Brett Wetterich (2)	6		
Sep 12	Virginia Beach Open	Virginia	450,000	(United States) James Driscoll (1)	6		
Sep 19	Oregon Classic	Oregon	450,000	(United States) Jeff Quinney (1)	6		
Sep 26	Albertsons Boise Open	Idaho	600,000	(United States) Scott Gump (3)	6		
Oct 3	Mark Christopher Charity Classic	California	450,000	(United States) Scott Dunlap (1)	6		
Oct 10	Gila River Classic	Arizona	475,000	(United States) Chris Nallen (1)	6		
Oct 17	Permian Basin Charity Golf Classic	Texas	450,000	(United States) Charley Hoffman (1)	6		
Oct 24	Miccosukee Championship	Florida	500,000	(United States) D. J. Trahan (1)	6		
Oct 31	Nationwide Tour Championship	Alabama	625,000	(United States) Nick Watney (1)	6		Tour Championship

== Money list ==
The money list was based on prize money won during the season, calculated in U.S. dollars. The top 20 players on the money list earned status to play on the 2005 PGA Tour.

Position	Player	Prize money ($)
1	(United States) Jimmy Walker	371,346
2	(United States) D. A. Points	332,815
3	(Japan) Ryuji Imada	313,185
4	(United States) Franklin Langham	312,896
5	(United States) Nick Watney	301,988

== Awards ==
Award	Winner	Ref.
Player of the Year (Jack Nicklaus Trophy)	(United States) Jimmy Walker	
