= Rick Price (golfer) =

American professional golfer (born 1968)

Personal information
- Full name: Richard N. Price III
- Nationality: United States
- Born: May 18, 1968 (age 58) Reading, Pennsylvania, U.S.
- Height: 6 ft 0 in (1.83 m)
- Weight: 160 lb (73 kg; 11 st)

Career
- Sport: Golf
- College: Methodist College
- Turned professional: 1987
- Former tours: PGA Tour; Nationwide Tour; Canadian Tour; Golden Bear Tour
- Professional wins: 22

Number of wins by tour
- Korn Ferry Tour: 2
- Other: 20

Best results in major championships
- Masters Tournament: DNP
- PGA Championship: DNP
- U.S. Open: CUT: 1991
- The Open Championship: DNP

Richard N. Price III (born May 18, 1968) is an American professional golfer who played on the PGA Tour.

== Career ==
Price joined the Nationwide Tour in 1999 where he played until 2001, took a hiatus in 2002 and rejoined in 2003. He won his first title at the Xerox Classic in 2005 but his breakout year came in 2008 when he won the Nationwide Tour Players Cup en route to a 12th-place finish on the money list, earning him his PGA Tour card for 2009. He did not have much success on the PGA Tour and returned to the Nationwide Tour the following year. He has won 20 events on mini tours and he has also played on the Canadian Tour.

== Professional wins (22) ==
=== Nationwide Tour wins (2) ===
No.	Date	Tournament	Winning score	Margin of victory	Runner-up
1	Aug 21, 2005	Xerox Classic	−11 (67-63-68-71=269)	1 stroke	(United States) Andrew Pratt
2	Jul 13, 2008	Nationwide Tour Players Cup	−15 (64-71-66-72=273)	Playoff	(United States) Chris Anderson

Nationwide Tour playoff record (1–0)

No.	Year	Tournament	Opponent	Result
1	2008	Nationwide Tour Players Cup	(United States) Chris Anderson	Won with bogey on first extra hole

=== Golden Bear Tour wins (1) ===
No.	Date	Tournament	Winning score	Margin of victory	Runner-up
1	Jun 11, 1998	Canon-USA Open	−11 (67-66-72=205)	1 stroke	(United States) R. J. Nakashian

=== Other wins (19) ===
- 19 other wins on mini tours

== Results in major championships ==
Tournament	1991
U.S. Open	CUT

CUT = missed the half-way cut
Note: Price only played in the U.S. Open.

== See also ==
- 2008 Nationwide Tour graduates
