= Casey Martin =

American golfer (born 1972)

Personal information
- Nationality: United States
- Born: June 2, 1972 (age 54) Eugene, Oregon, U.S.
- Height: 6 ft 2 in (1.88 m)
- Weight: 170 lb (77 kg; 12 st)

Career
- Sport: Golf
- College: Stanford University
- Turned professional: 1995
- Former tours: PGA Tour; Korn Ferry Tour
- Professional wins: 1

Number of wins by tour
- Korn Ferry Tour: 1

Best results in major championships
- Masters Tournament: DNP
- PGA Championship: DNP
- U.S. Open: T23: 1998
- The Open Championship: DNP

Casey Martin (born June 2, 1972) is an American professional golfer and the current men's golf head coach at the University of Oregon.

== Early life and amateur career ==
Martin was born in Eugene, Oregon and still resides there. He was educated at Stanford University where he was initiated into the Sigma Chi fraternity and was briefly a teammate of Tiger Woods. He was a three-time all Pac-10 and was a member of the university's NCAA Championship team in 1994. He won the 1993 Sahalee Players Championship.

== Professional career ==
In 1995, Martin turned professional. In 1998, he won a Nike Tour event, the Lakeland Classic, in a playoff, thus assuring himself of remaining on the tour the following year and securing a five-year exemption from the first round of Qualifying School (Q-School). Also in 1998, he attained a career highlight by finishing tied for 23rd at the U.S. Open, and briefly contending for the lead before falling back.

In late 1999, by finishing 14th on the Nike Tour money list, Martin secured a spot on the PGA Tour. He finished 179th on the money list in 2000 and failed to keep his card through his earnings on the PGA Tour. As a PGA Tour cardholder for 2000, he began at the final stage of that year's Q-School, but narrowly failed to keep his spot (finishing tied for 37th, when the top 35 and ties qualified), relegating him to the Buy.com Tour.

Martin kept full status on the Nike Tour through 2003, but failed to make the Q-School finals in 2003, relegating him to a limited status in 2004, a year in which he played nine tournaments. In 2004, following the expiration of his five-year exemption from the first round of Q-School, he advanced from the first to the second of the three rounds but no further, and only had limited status in 2005, playing nine tournaments on the tour and making two cuts. He played five events in 2006, making the cut once, for a total earnings of $1,328.

On June 4, 2012, Martin qualified for the 2012 U.S. Open, winning a sectional at Emerald Valley Golf Club.

=== Coaching career ===
In May 2006, Martin was named head coach of the University of Oregon's men's golf team in his hometown of Eugene, after working as a volunteer assistant during the 2006 season. He has indicated he hopes to continue to play, where it fits in with his coaching schedule. However, he did not play any professional events or attempt Q-School in 2007 or 2008. Oregon won the 2016 NCAA Division I Men's Golf Championship.

=== Medical issues ===
Martin has Klippel–Trénaunay syndrome, which has caused a birth defect in his right leg. In PGA Tour, Inc. v. Martin, Martin successfully sued the PGA Tour in 2001 for the right to use a golf cart during competition under the Americans with Disabilities Act. During the years that the suit wound through the courts, he enjoyed limited success on the golf course, and throughout, was permitted to use a golf cart.

In October 2019, while attempting to retrieve a garbage can from the street he lived on, he misjudged a step between the street, which was under construction, and his curb, breaking his defective leg. He took a medical leave from coaching during the Ducks' fall 2019 golf schedule, with assistant Brad Lanning taking over until he returned to campus for the spring season (which was ultimately shortened due to the coronavirus pandemic). Because his condition has prevented his fracture from properly healing, he has used crutches since returning to campus.

In a March 2020 interview with The Register-Guard, the daily newspaper for Oregon's home of Eugene, Martin said about the prospect of losing his leg, "I was grateful that I was able to hold it off for a long time. I thought it would happen at 27 not 47. But it has happened. I'm just going to do everything in my power to save my leg." He added that he had considered an amputation, recognizing that a prosthesis would enable him to walk without pain, but noted, "If I lose my leg, it would be an above-the-knee deal, and it's pretty risky for my situation anyway. It's something that I've recognized could happen, but I would really rather not, if I could save it, because of the risks." At the time of the interview, Martin was scheduled to travel to Washington state to be fitted for a special carbon-fiber leg brace that could potentially redirect his body weight in a way that would allow the fracture to heal.

In October 2021, Martin underwent successful surgery to amputate his right leg. His doctors believed that the surgery went well enough to allow him the future use of a prosthesis.

== Professional wins (1) ==
=== Nike Tour wins (1) ===
No.	Date	Tournament	Winning score	Margin of victory	Runner-up
1	Jan 11, 1998	Nike Lakeland Classic	−19 (66-69-65-69=269)	1 stroke	(United States) Steve Lamontagne

Nike Tour playoff record (0–1)

No.	Year	Tournament	Opponent	Result
1	1999	Nike Cleveland Open	(United States) Matt Gogel	Lost to eagle on second extra hole

== Results in major championships ==
Tournament	1998	1999	2000	2001	2002	2003	2004	2005	2006	2007	2008	2009	2010	2011	2012
U.S. Open	T23														CUT

Did not play

CUT = missed the half-way cut
"T" = tied
Note: Casey only played in the U.S. Open.

== Web.com Tour results ==
Year	Tournaments played	Cuts made	Wins	2nds	3rds	Top tens	Best finish	Earnings ($)	Money list rank
1998	22	16	1	0	0	3	1st	81,937	29
1999	24	13	0	2	1	6	2nd	122,742	14
2001	21	9	0	0	0	0	T-20	17,197	143
2002	14	5	0	0	1	1	T-3	30,218	117
2003	22	11	0	0	0	0	T-14	26,553	123
2004	8	2	0	0	0	0	T-12	12,653	174
2005	9	1	0	0	0	0	T-60	1,934	300
2006	5	1	0	0	0	0	T-59	1,328	310
2012	1	1	0	0	0	0	T-55	2,248	241

== PGA Tour results ==
Year	Tournaments played	Cuts made	Wins	2nds	3rds	Top tens	Best finish	Earnings ($)	Money list rank
1998	3	2	0	0	0	0	T-23	37,221	221
2000	29	14	0	0	0	0	T-17	143,248	179
2001	2	0	0	0	0	0	CUT	0	n/a
2002	3	0	0	0	0	0	CUT	0	n/a
2003	1	0	0	0	0	0	CUT	0	n/a
2004	2	2	0	0	0	0	T-69	15,858	n/a
2005	1	1	0	0	0	0	T-65	10,547	n/a
2012	2	0	0	0	0	0	CUT	0	n/a

== See also ==
- 1999 Nike Tour graduates
