= 2002 WGC-NEC Invitational =

Coordinates: 47.635°N 122.057°W

Tournament information
- Dates: August 22–25, 2002
- Location: Sammamish, Washington
- Course(s): Sahalee Country Club; South and North nines
- Tour(s): PGA Tour; European Tour

Statistics
- Par: 71
- Length: 6,949 yards (6,354 m)
- Field: 78 players
- Cut: None
- Prize fund: $5,500,000 €5,591,702
- Winner's share: $1,000,000 €1,016,673

Champion
- (Australia) Craig Parry
- 268 (−16)

Location in the United States

The 2002 WGC-NEC Invitational was a professional golf tournament, held August 22–25 at Sahalee Country Club in Sammamish, Washington. It was the fourth WGC-NEC Invitational tournament, and the second of four World Golf Championships events held in 2002. It was the only time the event was not held at Firestone Country Club in Akron, Ohio. Sahalee hosted the PGA Championship four years earlier in 1998.

Craig Parry won the tournament, four strokes ahead of runners-up Robert Allenby and Fred Funk, for his first victory on the PGA Tour. It was Parry's only win in a World Golf Championship event, and the first WGC-NEC Invitational which Tiger Woods did not win; his winning streak was stopped at three as he finished in fourth, five strokes back. Rich Beem, winner of the PGA Championship the previous week, finished in a tie for sixth.

With the win, Parry moved to 45th in the Official World Golf Ranking, up 73 spots from the previous week.

== Field ==
1. 2002 United States and European Ryder Cup teams

- United States: Paul Azinger (2,3), Mark Calcavecchia (3), Stewart Cink (2,3), David Duval (2,3,4), Jim Furyk (2,3,4), Scott Hoch (3), Davis Love III (2,3), Phil Mickelson (2,3,4), Hal Sutton (2), David Toms (3,4), Scott Verplank (3,4), Tiger Woods (2,3,4)
- Europe: Thomas Bjørn (3), Darren Clarke (3), Niclas Fasth (3), Pierre Fulke, Sergio García (3,4), Pádraig Harrington (3,4), Bernhard Langer (3, 4), Paul McGinley, Colin Montgomerie (3), Jesper Parnevik (3), Phillip Price, Lee Westwood

2. 2000 United States and International Presidents Cup teams

- United States: Notah Begay III, Tom Lehman (3), Loren Roberts, Kirk Triplett
- International: Robert Allenby (3,4), Stuart Appleby (3,5), Michael Campbell (3,4), Steve Elkington, Ernie Els (3,4), Carlos Franco, Retief Goosen (3,4), Shigeki Maruyama (3,4), Greg Norman, Nick Price (3,4), Vijay Singh (3,4), Mike Weir (3, 4)

3. Top 50 from the Official World Golf Ranking as of August 19

Rich Beem (4), Ángel Cabrera (4), José Cóceres (4), John Cook (4), Chris DiMarco (4), Bob Estes (4), Brad Faxon, Fred Funk, Toshimitsu Izawa, Jerry Kelly (4), Justin Leonard (4), Peter Lonard, Steve Lowery, Len Mattiace (4), Scott McCarron, Rocco Mediate (4), José María Olazábal (4), Kenny Perry, Eduardo Romero (4), Justin Rose (4), Kevin Sutherland (4)

4. Tournament winners of worldwide events since the 2001 WGC-NEC Invitational with an OWGR Strength of Field Rating of 100 points or more

K. J. Choi, John Daly, Tobias Dier, Joel Edwards, Matt Gogel, Ricardo González, Anders Hansen, Søren Hansen, Matt Kuchar, Paul Lawrie, Graeme McDowell, Craig Parry, Craig Perks, Chris Smith

5. The winner of selected tournaments from each of the following tours

- Japan Golf Tour: Japan Golf Tour Championship (2002) – Nobuhito Sato
- PGA Tour of Australasia: Australian Open (2001) – Stuart Appleby, qualified in categories 2 and 3
- Sunshine Tour: The Tour Championship (2002) – Nicholas Lawrence
- Asian Tour: Volvo China Open (2001) – Charlie Wi

== Round summaries ==
=== First round ===
Thursday, August 22, 2002

Place	Player	Score	To par
T1	(South Africa) Retief Goosen	65	−6
T1	(Japan) Toshimitsu Izawa	65	−6
T3	(Northern Ireland) Darren Clarke	66	−5
T3	(United States) Davis Love III	66	−5
T3	(United States) Phil Mickelson	66	−5
T6	(United States) Steve Lowery	67	−4
T6	(United States) Kenny Perry	67	−4
T6	(England) Justin Rose	67	−4
T9	(United States) Paul Azinger	68	−3
T9	(Denmark) Thomas Bjørn	68	−3
T9	(United States) Chris DiMarco	68	−3
T9	(United States) Fred Funk	68	−3
T9	(Spain) Sergio García	68	−3
T9	(United States) Matt Gogel	68	−3
T9	(United States) Rocco Mediate	68	−3
T9	(New Zealand) Craig Perks	68	−3
T9	(Fiji) Vijay Singh	68	−3
T9	(England) Lee Westwood	68	−3
T9	(United States) Tiger Woods	68	−3

=== Second round ===
Friday, August 23, 2002

Place	Player	Score	To par
T1	(Australia) Robert Allenby	69-63=132	−10
T1	(United States) Steve Lowery	67-65=132	−10
3	(South Africa) Retief Goosen	65-68=133	−9
4	(England) Justin Rose	67-67=134	−8
5	(United States) Phil Mickelson	66-69=135	−7
T6	(United States) Fred Funk	68-68=136	−6
T6	(United States) Loren Roberts	70-66=136	−6
T8	(Denmark) Thomas Bjørn	68-69=137	−5
T8	(United States) Jim Furyk	70-67=137	−5
T8	(United States) Matt Gogel	68-69=137	−5
T8	(United States) Rocco Mediate	68-69=137	−5
T8	(Australia) Craig Parry	72-65=137	−5
T8	(United States) Kenny Perry	67-70=137	−5
T8	(Fiji) Vijay Singh	68-69=137	−5
T8	(United States) David Toms	69-68=137	−5
T8	(England) Lee Westwood	68-69=137	−5

=== Third round ===
Saturday, August 24, 2002

Place	Player	Score	To par
T1	(Australia) Robert Allenby	69-63-71=203	−10
T1	(Australia) Craig Parry	72-65-66=203	−10
3	(United States) Fred Funk	68-68-68=204	−9
T4	(South Africa) Ernie Els	71-67-67=205	−8
T4	(United States) Jim Furyk	70-67-68=205	−8
T4	(United States) Matt Gogel	68-69-68=205	−8
T4	(United States) Steve Lowery	67-65-73=205	−8
T4	(United States) Tiger Woods	68-70-67=205	−8
T9	(United States) Phil Mickelson	66-69-71=206	−7
T9	(England) Justin Rose	67-67-72=206	−7
T9	(Fiji) Vijay Singh	68-69-69=206	−7

=== Final round ===
Sunday, August 25, 2002

Place	Player	Score	To par	Money ($)
1	(Australia) Craig Parry	72-65-66-65=268	−16	1,000,000
T2	(Australia) Robert Allenby	69-63-71-69=272	−12	410,000
T2	(United States) Fred Funk	68-68-68-68=272	−12	410,000
4	(United States) Tiger Woods	68-70-67-68=273	−11	215,000
5	(England) Justin Rose	67-67-72-68=274	−10	187,500
T6	(United States) Rich Beem	74-67-67-67=275	−9	150,000
T6	(United States) Jim Furyk	70-67-68-70=275	−9	150,000
8	(United States) Steve Lowery	67-65-73-71=276	−8	120,000
T9	(United States) Matt Gogel	68-69-68-72=277	−7	105,000
T9	(United States) Phil Mickelson	66-69-71-71=277	−7	105,000
