= Shreveport Open =

Golf tournament

Hibernia Southern Open
Tournament information
- Location: Shreveport, Louisiana
- Established: 1991
- Course: Southern Trace Country Club
- Par: 72
- Tour: Buy.com Tour
- Format: Stroke play
- Prize fund: $425,000
- Final year: 2003

Tournament record score
- Aggregate: 268 Pat Bates (2001)
- To par: −20 as above

Final champion
- (Canada) David Morland IV
- Location in the United States Location in Louisiana

The Shreveport Open was a golf tournament on the Buy.com Tour from 1991 to 2002. It was played at the Southern Trace Country Club in Shreveport, Louisiana. In its last year, it was sponsored by Hibernia National Bank and called the Hibernia Southern Open.

The purse in 2002 was $425,000, with $76,500 going to the winner.

== Winners ==
Year	Winner	Score	To par	Margin of victory	Runner(s)-up	Ref
Ben Hogan Shreveport Open
1991	(United States) Jeff Coston	210	−6	Playoff	(United States) Beau Baugh	
1992	(United States) Ted Tryba	202	−14	2 strokes	(United States) Skip Kendall	
Nike Shreveport Open
1993	(United States) Sonny Skinner	278	−10	1 stroke	(United States) Bob May	
1994	(United States) Omar Uresti	270	−18	Playoff	(United States) Pat Bates	
1995	(United States) Brad Fabel	131 (Note: Shortened to 36 holes due to rain.)	−13	4 strokes	(United States) Chris Smith	
1996	(United States) Tim Loustalot	277	−11	1 stroke	(United States) Joe Durant	
1997	(United States) Mark Wurtz	275	−13	1 stroke	(United States) Brian Kamm	
1998	(United States) Vance Veazey	280	−8	Playoff	(United States) John Wilson	
1999	(United States) Bob Heintz	283	−5	1 stroke	(United States) Craig Bowden (United States) Joel Edwards	
Buy.com Shreveport Open
2000	(United States) Kent Jones	273	−15	1 stroke	(United States) Keith Clearwater (United States) Tripp Isenhour	
2001	(United States) Pat Bates	268	−20	1 stroke	(United States) Brian Kamm	
Hibernia Southern Open
2002	(Canada) David Morland IV	197 (Note: Shortened to 54 holes due to rain.)	−19	3 strokes	(New Zealand) Steven Alker (United States) John Morse	
