= 2001 PGA Tour Qualifying School graduates =

Following is the list of 2001 PGA Tour Qualifying School graduates, the 36 professional golfers who earned their 2002 PGA Tour card through Q School in 2001.

Place	Player	PGA Tour starts	Cuts made	Notes
1	(United States) Pat Perez	0	0	1 Buy.com Tour win
T2	(United States) Ken Staton	2	0	1 Canadian Tour win
T2	(United States) Bob Burns	145	69	2 Buy.com Tour wins
T2	(United States) Pete Jordan	241	116	
T5	(Australia) John Senden	0	0	2 Challenge Tour wins
T5	(United States) Ben Crane	0	0	2 Buy.com Tour wins
T5	(Canada) Ian Leggatt	40	16	1 Buy.com Tour win
T8	(United States) Brad Elder	78	43	2 Buy.com Tour wins, played in 1997 Walker Cup
T8	(United States) Tommy Armour III	409	201	1 PGA Tour win, 2 Buy.com Tour wins
T10	(United States) Russ Cochran	541	331	1 PGA Tour win, won 1988 qualifying school
T10	(Australia) Peter Lonard	15	7	3 PGA Tour of Australasia wins
T10	(United States) Danny Ellis	28	10	Runner-up in 1993 U.S. Amateur
T13	(United States) Jess Daley	2	0	
T13	(United States) Robin Freeman	316	153	2 Buy.com Tour wins
T13	(United States) Brett Wetterich	11	1	
T13	(United States) Gary Nicklaus	90	25	Son of Jack Nicklaus
T13	(United States) Shaun Micheel	111	44	1 Asian Tour win, 2 Buy.com Tour wins
18	(United States) Brent Schwarzrock	40	17	
T19	(Colombia) Eduardo Herrera	8	4	5 Japan Golf Tour wins
T19	(Australia) Stephen Allan	35	14	1 European Tour win, won 2000 Qualifying school
T19	(United States) Bob Heintz	35	9	2 Buy.com Tour wins
T19	(United States) Michael Allen	131	68	1 European Tour win, 1 Buy.com Tour win
T23	(United States) Paul Claxton	24	10	1 Buy.com Tour win
T23	(United States) Ty Tryon	3	2	Youngest ever qualifying school graduate at 17
T23	(United States) John Riegger	111	50	
T23	(England) Luke Donald	12	4	Played in 1999 and 2001 Walker Cups
T23	(United States) Boo Weekley	0	0	1 Buy.com Tour win
T23	(United States) Brad Lardon	46	17	
T23	(New Zealand) Phil Tataurangi	126	47	1 Buy.com Tour win, 1 PGA Tour of Australasia win; member of winning 1992 Eisenhower Trophy team
T23	(United States) Lee Porter	153	60	
T23	(Japan) Hidemichi Tanaka	22	10	10 Japan Golf Tour wins
T32	(United States) Brian Bateman	3	0	1 Buy.com Tour win
T32	(United States) Stephen Gangluff	3	3	
T32	(United States) Blaine McCallister	523	305	5 PGA Tour wins, won 1999 qualifying school
T32	(United States) Kent Jones	85	32	2 Buy.com Tour wins
T32	(United States) Jeff Brehaut	28	14	2 Buy.com Tour wins

- Players in yellow were 2002 PGA Tour rookies.

== 2002 Results ==
Player	Starts	Cuts made	Best finish	Money list rank	Earnings ($)
(United States) Pat Perez*	30	14	2/T2 (twice)	40	1,451,726
(United States) Ken Staton*	36	14	T4	133	453,816
(United States) Bob Burns	30	19	Win	51	1,199,802
(United States) Pete Jordan	30	9	T28	198	101,330
(Australia) John Senden*	30	18	T9	114	578,613
(United States) Ben Crane*	30	16	2	70	921,076
(Canada) Ian Leggatt	29	20	Win	47	1,245,048
(United States) Brad Elder	26	11	3	147	362,892
(United States) Tommy Armour III	30	13	T7	145	379,191
(United States) Russ Cochran	24	12	T6	179	176,111
(Australia) Peter Lonard*	24	23	3	41	1,413,113
(United States) Danny Ellis	17	5	T21	208	73,340
(United States) Jess Daley*	27	10	T17	185	154,675
(United States) Robin Freeman	27	13	T5	169	227,179
(United States) Brett Wetterich	32	12	T8	174	203,034
(United States) Gary Nicklaus	26	6	T52	218	41,969
(United States) Shaun Micheel	30	21	T3	105	641,450
(United States) Brent Schwarzrock	9	6	T11	182	160,673
(Colombia) Eduardo Herrera*	23	7	8	196	109,953
(Australia) Stephen Allan	30	16	T14	149	359,655
(United States) Bob Heintz	28	6	T14	192	127,346
(United States) Michael Allen	29	9	T25	197	108,777
(United States) Paul Claxton	29	13	T23	184	156,696
(United States) Ty Tryon*	6	1	T41	242	8,620
(United States) John Riegger	29	16	T8	143	390,675
(England) Luke Donald*	30	23	Win	58	1,088,205
(United States) Boo Weekley*	24	5	T19	200	95,206
(United States) Brad Lardon	23	8	T38	209	71,511
(New Zealand) Phil Tataurangi	25	19	Win	33	1,643,686
(United States) Lee Porter	32	14	T14	178	179,396
(Japan) Hidemichi Tanaka*	31	21	T4	92	766,423
(United States) Brian Bateman*	31	16	T15	159	281,421
(United States) Stephen Gangluff*	27	10	T19	176	187,804
(United States) Blaine McCallister	27	9	T23 (twice)	194	123,349
(United States) Kent Jones	33	19	T8	131	489,879
(United States) Jeff Brehaut	29	14	T7	161	274,335

*PGA Tour rookie in 2002
T = Tied
Green background indicates the player retained his PGA Tour card for 2003 (finished inside the top 125).
Yellow background indicates the player did not retain his PGA Tour card for 2003, but retained conditional status (finished between 126 and 150).
Red background indicates the player did not retain his PGA Tour card for 2003 (finished outside the top 150).

== Winners on the PGA Tour in 2002 ==
No.	Date	Player	Tournament	Winning score	Margin of victory	Runner(s)-up
1	Feb 24	(Canada) Ian Leggatt	Touchstone Energy Tucson Open	−20 (68-71-65-64=268)	2 strokes	(United States) David Peoples, (United States) Loren Roberts
2	Oct 13	(New Zealand) Phil Tataurangi	Invensys Classic at Las Vegas	−29 (67-66-67-68-62=330)	1 stroke	(Australia) Stuart Appleby, (United States) Jeff Sluman
3	Oct 20	(United States) Bob Burns	Disney Golf Classic	−25 (63-68-67-65=263)	1 stroke	(United States) Chris DiMarco
4	Nov 4	(England) Luke Donald	Southern Farm Bureau Classic	−15 (66-68-67=201)	1 stroke	(South Africa) Deane Pappas

== Runners-up on the PGA Tour in 2002 ==
No.	Date	Player	Tournament	Winner	Winning score	Runner-up score
1	Feb 3	(United States) Pat Perez	AT&T Pebble Beach National Pro-Am	(United States) Matt Gogel	−14 (66-72-67-69=274)	−11 (66-65-70-76=277)
2	May 12	(United States) Ben Crane	Verizon Byron Nelson Classic	(Japan) Shigeki Maruyama	−14 (67-63-68-68=266)	−12 (68-67-68-65=268)
3	Jun 9	(United States) Pat Perez	Buick Classic	(United States) Chris Smith	−12 (66-69-67-70=272)	−10 (67-70-67-70=274)

== See also ==
- 2001 Buy.com Tour graduates
