= Guy Boros =

American professional golfer

Personal information
- Full name: Guy Donald Boros
- Nationality: United States
- Born: September 4, 1964 (age 62) Fort Lauderdale, Florida, U.S.
- Height: 6 ft 0 in (1.83 m)
- Weight: 265 lb (120 kg; 18.9 st)

Career
- Sport: Golf
- College: University of Iowa
- Turned professional: 1986
- Current tour: PGA Tour Champions
- Former tours: PGA Tour; Web.com Tour; Canadian Tour; PGA Tour of Australasia
- Professional wins: 6

Number of wins by tour
- PGA Tour: 1
- Korn Ferry Tour: 3
- Other: 2

Best results in major championships
- Masters Tournament: CUT: 1997
- PGA Championship: CUT: 1995, 1997
- U.S. Open: T36: 1995
- The Open Championship: DNP

Achievements and awards
- Canadian Tour Order of Merit winner: 1991

Guy Donald Boros (born September 4, 1964) is an American professional golfer who currently plays on the PGA Tour Champions. He previously played on the PGA Tour and the Nationwide Tour. He is the son of Hall of Fame golfer Julius Boros.

== Early life ==
Boros was born in Fort Lauderdale, Florida. He attended the University of Iowa and was a three-time All-Big Ten member of the golf team.

== Professional career ==
In 1986, Boros turned pro. He has played on the PGA Tour and its developmental tour in relatively equal amounts over the course of his career recording about a dozen top-10 finishes in each tour. He has one victory in an official PGA Tour event and three wins on the developmental tour. His best finish in a major championship is a T-36 at the 1995 U.S. Open.

In addition to the PGA Tour and the developmental tour, Boros played for four years on the Canadian Tour and two years on the PGA Tour of Australasia. In 1991, Boros was the leading money winner on the Canadian Tour with a win at the Xerox British Columbia Open.

== Personal life ==
Boros lives in Pompano Beach, Florida.

== Professional wins (6) ==
=== PGA Tour wins (1) ===
No.	Date	Tournament	Winning score	Margin of victory	Runners-up
1	Aug 25, 1996	Greater Vancouver Open	−12 (71-65-65-71=272)	1 stroke	(United States) Emlyn Aubrey, (United States) Lee Janzen, (United States) Taylor Smith

=== Nationwide Tour wins (3) ===
No.	Date	Tournament	Winning score	Margin of victory	Runner(s)-up
1	Sep 9, 2001	Buy.com Tri-Cities Open	−14 (71-68-70-65=274)	2 strokes	(United States) Jeff Gove
2	Jun 22, 2003	Lake Erie Charity Classic	−13 (69-67-69-70=275)	1 stroke	(United States) Chris Couch, (United States) Bob Heintz
3	Jul 27, 2003	Dayton Open	−23 (64-64-70-67=265)	3 strokes	(United States) Zach Johnson

Nationwide Tour playoff record (0–1)

No.	Year	Tournament	Opponent	Result
1	1993	Nike South Texas Open	(United States) Doug Martin	Lost to par on first extra hole

=== Canadian Tour wins (2) ===
No.	Date	Tournament	Winning score	Margin of victory	Runner-up
1	Sep 3, 1989	Perrier Atlantic Classic	−11 (68-69-69-71=277)	Playoff	(Canada) Jerry Anderson
2	Jun 23, 1991	Xerox British Columbia Open	−10 (72-63-70-69=274)	2 strokes	(United States) Ron Philo

== Results in major championships ==
Tournament	1995	1996	1997	1998
Masters Tournament			CUT	
U.S. Open	T36			CUT
PGA Championship	CUT		CUT	

Did not play

CUT = missed the half-way cut
"T" = Tied
Note: Boros never played in The Open Championship.

== See also ==
- 1993 PGA Tour Qualifying School graduates
- 2003 Nationwide Tour graduates
