= Joey Snyder III =

American golfer (born 1973)

Personal information
- Nationality: United States
- Born: June 7, 1973 (age 53) Springville, New York, U.S.
- Height: 6 ft 2 in (1.88 m)
- Weight: 225 lb (102 kg; 16.1 st)

Career
- Sport: Golf
- College: Arizona State University
- Turned professional: 1996
- Former tours: PGA Tour; Nationwide Tour; Canadian Tour

Joey Snyder III (born June 7, 1973) is an American professional golfer.

== Early life and amateur career ==
Snyder was born in Springville, New York. He played college golf at Arizona State University where he was a two-time honorable mention All-American. He won the 1996 Porter Cup.

== Professional career ==
In 1998 and 1999, Snyder played on the Nike Tour. His best finishes were a pair of T-3 in 1998: Nike Carolina Classic and Nike Greensboro Open. He then played on the Canadian Tour in 2000 and 2001 and the Gateway Tour from 2002 to 2004. He earned his 2005 PGA Tour card through Q School. His best finish was 4th at the 2005 Southern Farm Bureau Classic. He finished 72nd on the money list in 2005.

Snyder played only six events in 2006 due to neck and shoulder injuries. He maintained his status on the tour via a major medical extension through 2014. In 2011, he played five events on the Nationwide Tour, missing all five cuts. He played his first PGA Tour event in six years at the HP Byron Nelson Championship in May 2012.

== Amateur wins ==
- 1996 Porter Cup

== See also ==
- 2004 PGA Tour Qualifying School graduates
