= 1991 Canadian Tour =

Golf tour season

1991 Canadian Tour season
- Duration: June 6, 1991 – September 15, 1991
- Number of official events: 10
- Most wins: (Canada) Rick Todd (2)
- Order of Merit: (United States) Guy Boros

The 1991 Canadian Tour was the sixth season of the Canadian Tour, the main professional golf tour in Canada since it was formed in 1986.

== Schedule ==
The following table lists official events during the 1991 season.

Date	Tournament	Location	Purse (C$)	Winner (Note: The number in parentheses after each winner's name is the number of Canadian Tour events they had won up to and including that tournament.)	OWGR points
Jun 9	Payless-Pepsi Victoria Open	British Columbia	100,000	(Canada) Rick Todd (1)	n/a
Jun 16	Canadian Home Assurance Alberta Open	Alberta	100,000	(Canada) Rick Todd (2)	n/a
Jun 23	Xerox British Columbia Open	British Columbia	175,000	(United States) Guy Boros (2)	n/a
Jul 7	Willows Classic	Saskatchewan	100,000	(United States) Perry Parker (1)	n/a
Jul 14	Manitoba Open	Manitoba	100,000	(United States) Kelly Gibson (2)	n/a
Jul 21	Windsor Charity Classic	Ontario	100,000	(United States) John Erickson (1)	n/a
Aug 18	Lactantia-Sealtest Quebec Open	Quebec	100,000	(United States) Phillip Hatchett (1)	n/a
Aug 25	CPGA Championship	Quebec	150,000	(United States) Tom Harding (1)	4
Sep 1	Perrier Atlantic Classic	New Brunswick	100,000	(United States) Robert Meyer (1)	n/a
Sep 15	Nissan Tournament Players Championship	Ontario	150,000	(United States) Mark Wurtz (1)	n/a

== Order of Merit ==
The Order of Merit was based on prize money won during the season, calculated in Canadian dollars.

Position	Player	Prize money (C$)
1	(United States) Guy Boros	64,025
2	(Canada) Rick Todd	54,863
3	(United States) Kelly Gibson	44,794
4	(United States) Robert Meyer	43,482
5	(United States) Perry Parker	40,498
