= John Erickson (golfer) =

American professional golfer (born 1964)

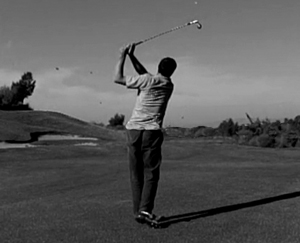

Personal information
- Nationality: United States
- Born: January 5, 1964 (age 62)

Career
- Sport: Golf
- College: Fresno State
- Status: Professional
- Former tours: PGA Tour of Australasia; Canadian Tour
- Professional wins: 2

John Erickson (born January 5, 1964) is an American professional golfer.

== Amateur career ==
Erickson was a top national collegiate player at Fresno State - Sun Bowl All American, 1985 Big West Conference champion, NCAA All-American as well as a quarter finalist in the 1983 U.S. Amateur.

Erickson was an early protégé of the controversial teaching method "The Golfing Machine" that was based upon the book of the same name written by Homer Kelley. The Golfing Machine drew from physics and geometry, breaking the golf swing down into 24 components, 4 power accumulators, 16 variations, and 4 imperatives. The objective nature of the teaching methodology differs from the past in that the teacher must remain objective and not inject a subjective or mysterious nature into instruction. "Complexity is far more simple and workable than mystery" quoted from The Golfing Machine (preface). Bobby Clampett, and Mac O'Grady were also having success using the Golfing Machine model around this time period.

== Professional career ==
Erickson played on the Canadian Tour from 1987 to 1994. He concurrently played on the PGA Tour of Australasia Tour from 1987 to 1992.

He won several events worldwide including the 1991 Windsor Charity Classic shooting a 17-under-par tournament record score of 271 (68-67-67-69) on the Canadian Tour. He was one of the last players to win an international event using a persimmon driver. In 1991, Erickson was a Sony World ranked professional player.

In 1993, Erickson retired from competition. Erickson has been quoted as being “a promoter of the traditional values of the game” and did not favor the direction the game was moving into longer courses, bigger greens wider fairways as well as radical equipment changes such as super large-headed titanium drivers and plastic golf balls. “Golf is a game played outside on a parkland where the course and the equipment should work in harmony. It should be required that the golfer to be tested across various aspects of the game including tee shots, short, mid and long irons particularly on the par 4’s as they were properly intended. Technology has been striving to remove the difficult long iron approach shot into the par fours of a championship golf course. Long iron approach shots should be the acid test of the game and the golf swing itself. A proper championship course with the traditional 10 par fours should require three or four long iron approach shots, along with the mid iron and short iron approaches”. As a golf purist, he believed woods should be made of wood or persimmon, strongly opposed perimeter weighted irons, and believed golf courses were sacred sites to celebrate and play the ancient game, not a vehicle to sell real estate home lots. Erickson believed golf should be a game of physical and mental skill, much like Chess where the rules for play are honored and respected. He believed the USGA did not stand up to the equipment makers, selling the game out for profit while forcing a new technology upon golf in the process losing its long-rooted traditional values. Erickson believed the world's classic old courses were not meant to be lengthened and in doing so, disgraced the design, shape, and intention of how the holes should be played. Erickson is outspoken about his support for famous golf architect Alister MacKenzie's ideals, who believed golf should be walked, and the game should be more about skill than the pursuit of technological advances in equipment.

In November 2009, after 15 years of retirement, Erickson made a return to professional competition and the winner's circle taking home a seven stroke victory in the TRGA Las Vegas Classic played at Las Vegas National Golf Club which hosted the Las Vegas Invitational on the PGA Tour throughout the 1960s and 1970s. The event was unique in that it required players to use equipment no later than 1979. No metal woods, long putters, or wedges over 56 degrees were allowed. The event followed the rules and guidelines of the Traditional Rules of Golf (TRGA).

Erickson has been a consultant for the Traditional Rules of Golf Association (TRGA) and has been a contributing author and part of the TRGA brain trust.

== Advanced Ball Striking Module Program ==
In 2009, Erickson founded the Advanced Ball Striking Module Program that teaches golfers a hitting approach to striking a golf ball. The golf swing is broken down into 9 biomechanical teaching Modules.

- 1 Forearm strength
- 2 Ground pressures
- 3 Post Impact Pivot Thrust
- 4 Cohesive body tensions
- 5 Hand attitudes
- 6 Backswing transition
- 7 Clubface stability and shaft pressure retention
- 8 Ball placement protocols
- 9 Shot shaping protocols

== Professional wins ==
=== Canadian Tour wins ===
No.	Date	Tournament	Winning score	Margin of victory	Runner-up
1	Jul 21, 1991	Windsor Charity Classic	−17 (68-67-67-69=271)	1 stroke	(Australia) Bradley Hughes

=== Other wins ===
- 2009 TRGA Las Vegas Classic
