= Omar Uresti =

American professional golfer (born 1968)

Personal information
- Full name: Omar David Uresti
- Nickname: O-man
- Nationality: United States
- Born: August 3, 1968 (age 58) Austin, Texas, U.S.
- Height: 5 ft 6 in (1.68 m)
- Weight: 175 lb (79 kg; 12.5 st)

Career
- Sport: Golf
- College: University of Texas
- Turned professional: 1991
- Former tours: PGA Tour; Nationwide Tour
- Professional wins: 9

Number of wins by tour
- Sunshine Tour: 1
- Korn Ferry Tour: 2
- Other: 6

Best results in major championships
- Masters Tournament: DNP
- PGA Championship: T73: 2017
- U.S. Open: T45: 1995
- The Open Championship: DNP

Omar David Uresti (born August 3, 1968) is an American professional golfer who played on the PGA Tour.

== Early life ==
Uresti was born in Austin, Texas. He attended the University of Texas in Austin and graduated in 1991 with a degree in organizational communication. He turned professional immediately after graduating.

== Professional career ==
Uresti has two wins on the Web.com Tour: one in 1994 at the Nike Shreveport Open, and one in 2007 at the Livermore Valley Wine Country Championship. Uresti went winless in over 350 PGA Tour starts, with two third-place finishes. He says his biggest accomplishment as a golfer was making a professional record nine consecutive birdies in a round on the Nationwide Tour. After his PGA Tour career ended, he became a life member of the Southern Texas chapter of the PGA.

Uresti has had success in the PGA Professional Championship, winning it twice, in 2017 and 2021, and finishing in the top 20 in 2015, 2016, and 2018, thus qualifying for the PGA Championship in those years. A number of club professionals criticized Uresti after his 2017 win because he was a former touring professional and he did not work full-time as a golf professional. The PGA responded that Uresti was eligible as an A-3 member with more than 20 years of PGA Tour membership.

== Professional wins (9) ==
=== Sunshine Tour wins (1) ===
No.	Date	Tournament	Winning score	Margin of victory	Runner-up
1	Feb 6, 1994	Hollard Royal Swazi Sun Classic	−14 (65-73-68-68=274)	2 strokes	(United States) Andrew Pitts

=== Nationwide Tour wins (2) ===
No.	Date	Tournament	Winning score	Margin of victory	Runner(s)-up
1	Apr 24, 1994	Nike Shreveport Open	−18 (65-71-63-71=270)	Playoff	(United States) Pat Bates
2	Apr 1, 2007	Livermore Valley Wine Country Championship	E (69-69-74-76=288)	2 strokes	(United States) Skip Kendall, (Australia) Aron Price

Nationwide Tour playoff record (1–0)

No.	Year	Tournament	Opponent	Result
1	1994	Nike Shreveport Open	(United States) Pat Bates	Won with birdie on sixth extra hole

=== Canadian Tour wins (1) ===
No.	Date	Tournament	Winning score	Margin of victory	Runners-up
1	Mar 20, 2005	Barton Creek Austin Challenge	−16 (63-73-63-65=264)	5 strokes	(Canada) Derek Gillespie, (Canada) Rob McMillan

=== Other wins (4) ===
- 2015 Southern Texas PGA Championship
- 2017 PGA Professional Championship
- 2018 Southern Texas PGA Championship
- 2021 PGA Professional Championship

=== Senior wins (1) ===
- 2020 Senior PGA Professional Championship

== Results in major championships ==
Tournament	1995	1996	1997	1998	1999
U.S. Open	T45	T101		CUT	CUT
PGA Championship					

Tournament	2000	2001	2002	2003	2004	2005	2006	2007	2008	2009
U.S. Open					CUT	T75				
PGA Championship										

Tournament	2010	2011	2012	2013	2014	2015	2016	2017	2018
U.S. Open									
PGA Championship						CUT	CUT	T73	CUT

Tournament	2019	2020	2021
PGA Championship			CUT
U.S. Open			

Did not play

CUT = missed the half-way cut
"T" = tied for place
Note: Uresti only played in the PGA Championship and the U.S. Open.

== Results in senior major championships ==
Tournament	2019	2020	2021	2022	2023	2024	2025	2026
Senior PGA Championship	T72	NT	CUT	T50			CUT	T51
The Tradition		NT						
U.S. Senior Open		NT		T55		T42		59
Senior Players Championship								
Senior British Open Championship		NT			CUT	CUT		

Did not play

"T" indicates a tie for a place
CUT = missed the halfway cut
NT = no tournament due to COVID-19 pandemic

== U.S. national team appearances ==
- PGA Cup: 2015, 2017, 2022 (winners)

== See also ==
- 1994 PGA Tour Qualifying School graduates
- 1995 PGA Tour Qualifying School graduates
- 2003 PGA Tour Qualifying School graduates
- 2004 PGA Tour Qualifying School graduates
- 2007 Nationwide Tour graduates
- 2009 PGA Tour Qualifying School graduates
- List of male golfers
