= Mike Bennett and Andy Plummer =

American golf instructor duo

Mike Bennett (born December 12, 1967, in Jordan, New York) and Andy Plummer (born December 23, 1966, in Vanceburg, Kentucky) are a duo of golf instructors who have coached PGA Tour players Charlie Wi, Steve Elkington, Tom Scherrer, Grant Waite, Troy Matteson, Bill Lunde, Mike Weir and Aaron Baddeley, among others. Bennett and Plummer are also known because the golf swing model they developed challenges some aspects of current mainstream golf instruction.

Bennett and Plummer played in the mini tours during the mid-1990s and later committed to instruction in the early 2000s, after taking courses with Larry Bartosek, Tom Tomesello, Mike Bender and Mac O'Grady.

== The stack and tilt swing ==
Bennett and Plummer wrote, with Peter Morrice, the book The Stack and Tilt Swing (ISBN 978-1-592-40447-6). The "Stack and Tilt" model prescribes keeping the body weight forward during the whole swing, straightening the back leg through back swing and performing a steep shoulder turn, all in order to keep the shoulder turn axis in place. The theory follows some ideas that are present in Homer Kelley's book "The Golfing Machine".

The method was called that way because of the way the spine tilts throughout the swing to keep the golfer "stacked", or to keep the upper-body center in one place during the swing, and the name was chosen with the help of Charlie Wi.

In Stack and Tilt the weight starts left (for righthanded players) and goes more left during the swing. This idea collides with mainstream golf instruction, but is shared by Sean Foley.

The Bennett and Plummer model gained publicity beyond the PGA Tour players and instructors environment once a major golf magazine covered it in June 2007. Since then, it also received criticism from other instructors.
