= Carl Paulson =

American professional golfer (born 1970)

Personal information
- Full name: Carl Albert Paulson
- Nationality: United States
- Born: December 29, 1970 (age 55) Quantico, Virginia, U.S.
- Height: 5 ft 9 in (1.75 m)
- Weight: 180 lb (82 kg; 13 st)

Career
- Sport: Golf
- College: University of South Carolina
- Turned professional: 1994
- Former tours: PGA Tour; Nike Tour
- Professional wins: 2

Number of wins by tour
- Korn Ferry Tour: 2

Best results in major championships
- Masters Tournament: DNP
- PGA Championship: CUT: 2001, 2002
- U.S. Open: CUT: 1996, 2001, 2004
- The Open Championship: CUT: 2001

Achievements and awards
- Nike Tour money list winner: 1999
- Nike Tour Player of the Year: 1999

Carl Albert Paulson (born December 29, 1970) is an American professional golfer.

== Early life and amateur career ==
Paulson attended the University of South Carolina where he was an All-American and the Southeastern Conference Player of the Year in 1993.

== Professional career ==
Paulson turned professional in 1994. He was the medalist at the 1995 PGA Tour Qualifying Tournament. Paulson was a member of the PGA Tour in 1995 and 1996 and from 2000 to 2008. He was a member of the Nike Tour from 1997 to 1999 and led the Nike Tour's money list in 1999. Paulson did not play in another PGA Tour event until 2011 after sustaining back injuries at the U.S. Bank Championship in Milwaukee on July 21, 2005. He withdrew from that event and was sidelined for an extended period. He earned his card for 2006 through a major medical exemption but did not play in any events due to the chronic nature of his injuries. He returned to competition in 2010 on the Nationwide Tour.

Paulson wrote the book, Rookie on Tour, with Virginia psychologist Louis Janda. It was published in 1999.

Paulson is currently the co-host of "Inside the Ropes" on SiriusXM radio and a volunteer coach for the South Carolina Gamecocks men's golf team.

== Professional wins (2) ==
=== Nike Tour wins (2) ===
No.	Year	Tournament	Winning score	Margin of victory	Runners-up
1	Sep 5, 1999	Nike Utah Classic	−22 (68-64-65-69=266)	6 strokes	(United States) Craig Bowden, (South Africa) Marco Gortana
2	Sep 19, 1999	Nike Boise Open	−18 (69-66-65-66=266)	4 strokes	(United States) Joel Edwards, (United States) Michael Muehr

Nike Tour playoff record (0–1)

No.	Year	Tournament	Opponents	Result
1	1997	Nike Wichita Open	(United States) Ben Bates, (United States) Jeff Brehaut, (United States) Chris Smith	Bates won with birdie on first extra hole

== Results in major championships ==
Tournament	1996	1997	1998	1999	2000	2001	2002	2003	2004
U.S. Open	CUT					CUT			CUT
The Open Championship						CUT			
PGA Championship						CUT	CUT		

Note: Paulson never played in the Masters Tournament.

Did not play

CUT = missed the half-way cut

== Results in The Players Championship ==
Tournament	2001	2002	2003
The Players Championship	T68	T4	WD

Top 10

WD = withdrew
"T" indicates a tie for a place

== See also ==
- 1994 PGA Tour Qualifying School graduates
- 1995 PGA Tour Qualifying School graduates
- 1999 Nike Tour graduates
- 2004 PGA Tour Qualifying School graduates
