= Steve Gotsche =

American professional golfer (born 1961)

Personal information
- Nationality: United States
- Born: August 24, 1961 (age 65) WaKeeney, Kansas, U.S.
- Height: 6 ft 2 in (1.88 m)
- Weight: 195 lb (88 kg; 13.9 st)

Career
- Sport: Golf
- College: Barton County Community College; University of Nebraska
- Turned professional: 1985
- Former tours: PGA Tour; Nationwide Tour
- Professional wins: 8

Number of wins by tour
- Korn Ferry Tour: 2
- Other: 6

Best results in major championships
- Masters Tournament: DNP
- PGA Championship: DNP
- U.S. Open: T32: 1996
- The Open Championship: DNP

Steve Gotsche (born August 24, 1961) is an American professional golfer. He played on the PGA Tour.

== Career ==
In 1985, Gotsche turned professional. At 1993 PGA Tour Qualifying School graduates he had success, earning PGA Tour membership. In 1994, in his rookie year, he recorded the best PGA Tour finish of his career, a fifth-place finish at the New England Classic. Gotsche did not play well enough to retain his tour card. However, he regained his card through 1994 PGA Tour Qualifying School. However, he ultimately lost his card.

In 1996, Gotsche joined the Nike Tour. He only played in three events from 1997 to 1998. In 1999, however, he had his breakthrough year on the developmental tour, winning the Nike Monterrey Open and the Nike Upstate Classic. He finished in 15th-place finish on the money list, earning a PGA Tour card for the following season. In his return to the PGA Tour he did not play well enough to retain his card. He played on the developmental tour again in 2001 and 2002.

== Amateur wins ==
- 1984 Kansas Amateur

== Professional wins (8) ==
=== Nike Tour wins (2) ===
| No. | Date | Tournament | Winning score | Margin of victory | Runner(s)-up |
|---|---|---|---|---|---|
| 1 | Mar 21, 1999 | Nike Monterrey Open | −18 (67-67-70-66=270) | 2 strokes | (United States) Kelly Gibson |
| 2 | May 2, 1999 | Nike Upstate Classic | −8 (71-68-69=208) (Note: Shortened to 54 holes due to weather.) | 2 strokes | (United States) Sam Randolph, (United States) Jim Johnson |

=== Other wins (6) ===
- 1988 Wyoming Open
- 1990 PGA Assistant Professional Championship, Kansas Open
- 1998 Nebraska Open
- 2008 Midwest PGA Championship
- 2018 Senior Midwest PGA Championship

== Results in major championships ==
| Tournament | 1985 | 1986 | 1987 | 1988 | 1989 | 1990 | 1991 | 1992 | 1993 | 1994 |
|---|---|---|---|---|---|---|---|---|---|---|
| U.S. Open | CUT | CUT | CUT | | | | T55 | CUT | T68 | |

| Tournament | 1995 | 1996 | 1997 | 1998 | 1999 | 2000 | 2001 | 2002 | 2003 | 2004 |
|---|---|---|---|---|---|---|---|---|---|---|
| U.S. Open | | T32 | | | | | | | CUT | CUT |

Note: Gotsche only played in the U.S. Open.

Did not play

CUT = missed the half-way cut
"T" = tied

== See also ==
- 1993 PGA Tour Qualifying School graduates
- 1994 PGA Tour Qualifying School graduates
- 1999 Nike Tour graduates
