= Tri-Cities Open =

Golf tournament, 1991 to 2001

Buy.com Tri-Cities Open
Tournament information
- Location: Richland, Washington
- Established: 1991
- Course: Meadow Springs Country Club
- Par: 72
- Tour: Buy.com Tour
- Format: Stroke play
- Prize fund: US$425,000
- Month played: September
- Final year: 2001

Tournament record score
- Aggregate: 267 Phil Tataurangi (1996)
- To par: −21 as above

Final champion
- (United States) Guy Boros
- Location in the United States Location in Washington

The Tri-Cities Open was a golf tournament on the Buy.com Tour. It ran annually from 1991 to 2001. It was played at Meadow Springs Country Club in Richland, Washington. After 2001, the event was discontinued, as there was no longer a title sponsor for the event. It was previously sponsored by Ben Hogan from 1991 to 1992, Nike from 1993 to 1999 and then Buy.com from 2000 to 2001.

== Winners ==
Year	Winner	Score	To par	Margin of victory	Runner(s)-up	Ref.
Buy.com Tri-Cities Open
2001	(United States) Guy Boros	274	−14	2 strokes	(United States) Jeff Gove	
2000	(United States) Darron Stiles	282	−6	2 strokes	(United States) John Kernohan	
Nike Tri-Cities Open
1999	(Canada) Glen Hnatiuk	278	−10	1 stroke	(United States) J. J. Henry (United States) Larry Silveira	
1998	(United States) Matt Gogel	276	−12	Playoff	(United States) Brian Bateman	
1997	(United States) Todd Gleaton	283	−5	1 stroke	(United States) Kent Jones (United States) Patrick Lee (United States) Tim Loustalot (United States) Rob Moss (Australia) Terry Price (Canada) Ray Stewart	
1996	(New Zealand) Phil Tataurangi	267	−21	6 strokes	(United States) Skip Kendall	
1995	(United States) Jeff Gove	202	−14	Playoff	(United States) Franklin Langham	
1994	(United States) Jerry Haas	203	−13	1 stroke	(United States) Brad Fabel	
1993	(United States) Steve Jurgensen	207	−9	1 stroke	(United States) Stan Utley	
Ben Hogan Tri-Cities Open
1992	(United States) Rick Pearson	210	−6	2 strokes	(United States) Curt Byrum (United States) Mike Foster	
1991	(United States) Kelly Gibson	205	−11	2 strokes	(Canada) Jerry Anderson	
