= 2002 U.S. Open (golf) =

Coordinates: 40.742°N 73.455°W

Tournament information
- Dates: June 13–16, 2002
- Location: Farmingdale, New York
- Course: Bethpage State Park, Black Course
- Organized by: USGA
- Tour(s): PGA Tour; European Tour; Japan Golf Tour

Statistics
- Par: 70
- Length: 7,214 yards (6,596 m)
- Field: 156 players, 72 after cut
- Cut: 150 (+10)
- Prize fund: $6,250,000 €6,614,456
- Winner's share: $1,000,000 €1,058,313

Champion
- (United States) Tiger Woods
- 277 (−3)

Location in the United States

The 2002 United States Open Championship was the 102nd U.S. Open, held June 13–16 at the Black Course of Bethpage State Park in Farmingdale, New York, east of New York City on Long Island. Tiger Woods was the champion at 277 (−3), three shots ahead of runner-up Phil Mickelson. It was Woods' second U.S. Open victory and eighth major championship win of his career. Woods was the only golfer in the field to finish under par.

This U.S. Open was billed as "The People's Open", as it was the first to be held on a true public golf course.

For the first time in thirty years, the winner of the Masters also won the U.S. Open, for the first half of the grand slam. It was last accomplished by Jack Nicklaus in 1972, and also by Arnold Palmer (1960), Ben Hogan (1951, 1953), and Craig Wood (1941).

Nick Faldo and Hale Irwin were given special exemptions from the USGA to play in the event.

== Course layout ==
Bethpage State Park - Black Course

Hole	1	2	3	4	5	6	7	8	9	Out	10	11	12	13	14	15	16	17	18	In	Total
Yardage	430	389	205	517	451	408	489	210	418	3,517	492	435	499	554	161	459	479	207	411	3,697	7,214
Par	4	4	3	5	4	4	4	3	4	35	4	4	4	5	3	4	4	3	4	35	70

== Field ==
1. Last 10 U.S. Open Champions

Ernie Els (9,10,11,14,17), Retief Goosen (8,10,11,14,17), Lee Janzen, Steve Jones, Tom Kite (8), Corey Pavin, Tiger Woods (3,4,5,8,9,11,12,17)

2. The U.S. Amateur champion

- Bubba Dickerson forfeited his exemption by turning professional.

3. Last five Masters Champions

José María Olazábal (11,17), Mark O'Meara (4), Vijay Singh (5,8,9,11,17)

4. Last five British Open Champions

David Duval (9,17), Paul Lawrie (10), Justin Leonard (9,17)

5. Last five PGA Champions

Davis Love III (8,9,17), David Toms (9,11,12,17)

6. The Players Champion

Craig Perks

7. The U.S. Senior Open Champion

- Bruce Fleisher did not play.

8. Top 15 finishers and ties in the 2001 U.S. Open

Michael Allen, Paul Azinger (17), Mark Brooks, Ángel Cabrera (10,17), Stewart Cink (9,17), Sergio García (9,12,17), Matt Gogel, Rocco Mediate (17), Phil Mickelson (9,11,17), Kirk Triplett

9. Top 30 leaders on the 2001 PGA Tour official money list

Robert Allenby (17), Mark Calcavecchia (17), Chris DiMarco (11,17), Joe Durant (17), Bob Estes (12,17), Brad Faxon (17), Jim Furyk (17), Scott Hoch (12,17), Bernhard Langer (10,17), Tom Lehman (17), Frank Lickliter, Steve Lowery, Scott McCarron (17), Billy Mayfair, Kenny Perry (17), Jeff Sluman, Steve Stricker, Hal Sutton (17), Scott Verplank (17), Mike Weir (17)

10. Top 15 on the 2001 European Tour Order of Merit

Thomas Bjørn (17), Michael Campbell (17), Darren Clarke (17), Niclas Fasth (17), Pádraig Harrington (17), David Howell, Robert Karlsson, Paul McGinley (17), Colin Montgomerie (17), Adam Scott (17)

11. Top 10 on the PGA Tour official money list, as of May 26

Shigeki Maruyama (17), Nick Price (17)

12. Winners of multiple PGA Tour events from April 25, 2001, through the 2002 Kemper Insurance Open

13. Special exemptions selected by the USGA

Nick Faldo, Hale Irwin

14. Top 2 from the 2002 European Tour Order of Merit, as of May 27

15. Top 2 on the 2001 Japan Golf Tour, provided they are within the top 75 point leaders of the Official World Golf Rankings at that time

Toshimitsu Izawa (17), Shingo Katayama (17)

16. Top 2 on the 2001–02 PGA Tour of Australasia as of March 17, 2002, provided they are within the top 75 point leaders of the Official World Golf Rankings at that time

Peter O'Malley, Craig Parry

17. Top 50 on the Official World Golf Rankings list, as of May 27

Billy Andrade, José Cóceres, John Cook, John Daly, Dudley Hart, Jerry Kelly, Matt Kuchar, Len Mattiace, Jesper Parnevik, Kevin Sutherland

Sectional qualifiers

- Daly City, California: Ricky Barnes (a,L), Paul Goydos, Andy Miller (L)
- Denver, Colorado: Ben Portie, Derek Tolan (a,L)
- Tampa, Florida: John Huston, Greg Norman, Tony Soerries (L), Kevin Warrick (a,L)
- Roswell, Georgia: Ken Duke (L), Thomas Levet, Scott Parel (L)
- North Barrington, Illinois: Tom Gillis, Adam Speirs (L)
- Rockville, Maryland: Stephen Ames, Stuart Appleby, Woody Austin, Jay Don Blake, Craig Bowden (L), Olin Browne, Greg Chalmers, Michael Clark II, Ben Crane, Luke Donald, Jim Gallagher Jr., Brian Gay, Brent Geiberger, Lucas Glover (L), Paul Gow, Jerry Haas (L), Steve Haskins, Donnie Hammond, Tim Herron, Charles Howell III, Kent Jones, Pete Jordan, Franklin Langham, Brad Lardon (L), Peter Lonard, Blaine McCallister, George McNeill (L), Spike McRoy (L), Michael Muehr, Steve Pate, Joey Sindelar, Heath Slocum, Hidemichi Tanaka, Phil Tataurangi
- St. Louis, Missouri: Trevor Dodds, Tom Pernice Jr., Mario Tiziani (L)
- Purchase, New York: Tom Byrum, Jason Caron (L), Jim Carter, K. J. Choi, Scott Dunlap, Harrison Frazar, David Frost, Kelly Gibson, Wayne Grady, Jay Haas, Per-Ulrik Johansson, Darrell Kestner (L), Taichiro Kiyota (a), Jeff Maggert, John Maginnes, Jim McGovern, Pat Perez, Jeev Milkha Singh, Craig Stadler, Paul Stankowski, Bob Tway, Jean van de Velde, Kaname Yokoo
- Cincinnati, Ohio: Steve Flesch, Ian Leggatt, Todd Rose (L)
- Aloha, Oregon: Ryan Moore (a,L)
- Export, Pennsylvania: Charles Raulerson (L)
- Houston, Texas: Andrew Sanders (L), Jimmy Walker

Alternates who gained entry

- Felix Casas (Daly City) replaced Bruce Fleisher

(a) denotes amateur
(L) denotes player advanced through local qualifying

== Round summaries ==
=== First round ===
Thursday, June 13, 2002

Place	Player	Score	To par
1	(United States) Tiger Woods	67	−3
2	(Spain) Sergio García	68	−2
T3	(South Korea) K. J. Choi	69	−1
T3	(United States) Dudley Hart	69	−1
T3	(United States) Jeff Maggert	69	−1
T3	(United States) Billy Mayfair	69	−1
T7	(United States) Stewart Cink	70	E
T7	(England) Nick Faldo	70	E
T7	(Republic of Ireland) Pádraig Harrington	70	E
T7	(United States) Franklin Langham	70	E
T7	(United States) Steve Lowery	70	E
T7	(United States) Phil Mickelson	70	E

=== Second round ===
Friday, June 14, 2002

Place	Player	Score	To par
1	(United States) Tiger Woods	67-68=135	−5
2	(Republic of Ireland) Pádraig Harrington	70-68=138	−2
T3	(South Korea) K. J. Choi	69-73=142	+2
T3	(Spain) Sergio García	68-74=142	+2
T3	(United States) Davis Love III	71-71=142	+2
T3	(United States) Jeff Maggert	69-73=142	+2
T7	(Japan) Shigeki Maruyama	76-67=143	+3
T7	(United States) Billy Mayfair	69-74=143	+3
T7	(United States) Phil Mickelson	70-73=143	+3
T10	(Australia) Robert Allenby	74-70=144	+4
T10	(United States) Tom Byrum	72-72=144	+4
T10	(Sweden) Niclas Fasth	72-72=144	+4
T10	(United States) Steve Flesch	72-72=144	+4
T10	(United States) Justin Leonard	73-71=144	+4
T10	(United States) Scott McCarron	72-72=144	+4
T10	(United States) Rocco Mediate	72-72=144	+4

Amateurs: Warrick (+9), Kiyota (+12), Barnes (+13), Moore (+15), Tolan (+26).

=== Third round ===
Saturday, June 15, 2002

Place	Player	Score	To par
1	(United States) Tiger Woods	67-68-70=205	−5
2	(Spain) Sergio García	68-74-67=209	−1
T3	(United States) Jeff Maggert	69-73-68=210	E
T3	(United States) Phil Mickelson	70-73-67=210	E
T5	(Australia) Robert Allenby	74-70-67=211	+1
T5	(Republic of Ireland) Pádraig Harrington	70-68-73=211	+1
T5	(United States) Billy Mayfair	69-74-68=211	+1
T8	(England) Nick Faldo	70-76-66=212	+2
T8	(United States) Justin Leonard	73-71-68=212	+2
T10	(United States) Tom Byrum	72-72-70=214	+4
T10	(United States) Davis Love III	71-71-72=214	+4
T10	(United States) Scott McCarron	72-72-70=214	+4

=== Final round ===
Sunday, June 16, 2002

Place	Player	Score	To par	Money ($)
1	(United States) Tiger Woods	67-68-70-72=277	−3	1,000,000
2	(United States) Phil Mickelson	70-73-67-70=280	E	585,000
3	(United States) Jeff Maggert	69-73-68-72=282	+2	362,356
4	(Spain) Sergio García	68-74-67-74=283	+3	252,546
T5	(England) Nick Faldo	70-76-66-73=285	+5	182,882
T5	(United States) Scott Hoch	71-75-70-69=285	+5	182,882
T5	(United States) Billy Mayfair	69-74-68-74=285	+5	182,882
T8	(United States) Tom Byrum	72-72-70-72=286	+6	138,665
T8	(Republic of Ireland) Pádraig Harrington	70-68-73-75=286	+6	138,665
T8	(Zimbabwe) Nick Price	72-75-69-70=286	+6	138,665

Amateurs: Warrick (+27)

==== Scorecard ====
Final round

Hole	1	2	3	4	5	6	7	8	9	10	11	12	13	14	15	16	17	18
Par	4	4	3	5	4	4	4	3	4	4	4	4	5	3	4	4	3	4
(United States) Woods	−4	−3	−3	−3	−3	−3	−4	−4	−4	−4	−4	−4	−5	−5	−5	−4	−4	−3
(United States) Mickelson	−1	−1	−1	−1	E	+1	+1	E	E	E	−1	−1	−2	−2	−2	−1	E	E
(United States) Maggert	E	E	+2	+1	E	E	+1	+1	+1	+1	+1	+1	+1	+1	+2	+2	+2	+2
(Spain) García	−1	−1	E	E	E	E	+1	+1	+2	+2	+2	+3	+3	+2	+2	+2	+2	+3
(England) Faldo	+2	+1	+1	+1	+2	+2	+3	+3	+3	+3	+4	+5	+5	+5	+4	+5	+5	+5
(United States) Hoch	+5	+4	+4	+4	+3	+3	+4	+4	+4	+5	+6	+7	+7	+6	+7	+7	+5	+5
(United States) Mayfair	+1	+2	+1	+2	+2	+4	+4	+4	+4	+4	+6	+6	+6	+6	+6	+6	+6	+5

Cumulative tournament scores, relative to par

Eagle	Birdie	Bogey	Double bogey
