= J. J. Killeen =

American professional golfer (born 1981)

Personal information
- Full name: Joseph James Killeen
- Nationality: United States
- Born: October 22, 1981 (age 45) San Diego, California, U.S.
- Height: 6 ft 1 in (1.85 m)
- Weight: 195 lb (88 kg; 13.9 st)

Career
- Sport: Golf
- College: Texas Christian University
- Turned professional: 2005
- Former tours: PGA Tour; Nationwide Tour
- Professional wins: 4

Number of wins by tour
- Korn Ferry Tour: 2
- Other: 2

Best results in major championships
- Masters Tournament: DNP
- PGA Championship: CUT: 2023
- U.S. Open: DNP
- The Open Championship: DNP

Achievements and awards
- Nationwide Tour money list winner: 2011
- Nationwide Tour Player of the Year: 2011

Joseph James "J.J." Killeen (born October 22, 1981) is an American professional golfer.

== Early life and amateur career ==
Killeen was born in San Diego, California. He played college golf at Texas Christian University.

== Professional career ==
In 2005, Killeen turned professional. He played on mini-tours, including the Tight Lies Tour (winning once) and the NGA Hooters Tour before joining the Nationwide Tour in 2008.

Killeen made it to the final round of 2010 Q School, but missed earning a tour card by a single stroke.

Killeen won his first Nationwide Tour event in 2011 at the Utah Championship. He won again the following week at the Cox Classic in Nebraska. Killeen ended the 2011 season as the top money earner on the Nationwide Tour, which grants him a full-season exemption on the PGA Tour for 2012, a spot in The Players Championship, and exemption from the reshuffle. He was also voted the Nationwide Tour Player of the Year.

After his touring career ended, Killeen became a club professional out of the Northern Texas section of the PGA. He was one of twenty club pros to qualify for the 2023 PGA Championship.

== Awards and honors ==
- In 2011, Killeen won the money list for the Nationwide Tour.
- In 2011, Killeen was voted by his peers as the Nationwide Tour Player of the Year.

== Professional wins (4) ==
=== Nationwide Tour wins (2) ===
| No. | Date | Tournament | Winning score | Margin of victory | Runner(s)-up |
|---|---|---|---|---|---|
| 1 | Jul 31, 2011 | Utah Championship | −22 (62-67-68-65=262) | 4 strokes | (United States) Jeff Gove |
| 2 | Aug 7, 2011 | Cox Classic | −22 (66-64-63-69=262) | 1 stroke | (Sweden) Jonas Blixt, (England) Gary Christian, (United States) Ken Duke, (New Zealand) Danny Lee |

Nationwide Tour playoff record (0–1)

| No. | Year | Tournament | Opponent | Result |
|---|---|---|---|---|
| 1 | 2008 | Livermore Valley Wine Country Championship | (Australia) Aron Price | Lost to par on second extra hole |

=== Other wins (2) ===
- 2005 High Meadows Ranch Classic (Tight Lies Tour)
- 2021 The Joyce Crane | Veritex Bank Section Championship

== Results in major championships ==
| Tournament | 2023 |
|---|---|
| PGA Championship | CUT |

Did not play

Note: Killeen only played in the PGA Championship.

== Results in The Players Championship ==
| Tournament | 2012 |
|---|---|
| The Players Championship | CUT |

CUT = missed the halfway cut

== See also ==
- 2011 Nationwide Tour graduates
