= Lakeland Classic =

Buy.com Lakeland Classic
Tournament information
- Location: Lakeland, Florida
- Established: 1997
- Courses: Grasslands Golf and Country Club
- Par: 72
- Tour: Buy.com Tour
- Format: Stroke play
- Prize fund: US$400,000
- Month played: February
- Final year: 2000

Tournament record score
- Aggregate: 269 Ryan Howison (1997); 269 Casey Martin (1998)
- To par: −19 as above

Final champion
- (United States) Donnie Hammond
- Location in the United States Location in Florida

The Lakeland Classic was a golf tournament on the Buy.com Tour from 1997 to 2000. It was played at Grasslands Golf & Country Club in Lakeland, Florida.

The purse in 2000 was US$400,000, with $72,000 going to the winner.

== Winners ==
Year	Winner	Score	To par	Margin of victory	Runner(s)-up
Buy.com Lakeland Classic
2000	(United States) Donnie Hammond	272	−16	1 stroke	(United States) Jeff Gallagher (United States) Tom Kalinowski
Nike Lakeland Classic
1999	(United States) Ryan Howison (2)	275	−13	1 stroke	(Canada) Glen Hnatiuk (United States) Jim McGovern (United States) Shaun Micheel
1998	(United States) Casey Martin	269	−19	1 stroke	(United States) Steve Lamontagne
1997	(United States) Ryan Howison	269	−19	3 strokes	(United States) Mark Carnevale
