= Livermore Valley Wine Country Championship =

Golf tournament

Tournament information
- Location: Livermore, California, U.S.
- Established: 2006
- Course: The Course at Wente Vineyards
- Par: 72
- Length: 7,285 yards (6,661 m)
- Tour: Nationwide Tour
- Format: Stroke play
- Prize fund: $600,000
- Month played: April
- Final year: 2008

Tournament record score
- Aggregate: 279 Tripp Isenhour (2006)
- To par: −9 as above

Current champion
- (Australia) Aron Price

Location map
- Location in the United States Location in California

The Livermore Valley Wine Country Championship was a golf tournament on the Nationwide Tour from 2006 to 2008. It was played at The Course at Wente Vineyards in Livermore, California, United States.

The 2008 purse was $600,000, with $108,000 going to the winner.

== Winners ==
Year	Winner	Score	To par	Margin of victory	Runner(s)-up
2008	(Australia) Aron Price	283	−5	Playoff	(United States) J. J. Killeen
2007	(United States) Omar Uresti	288	E	2 strokes	(United States) Skip Kendall (Australia) Aron Price
2006	(United States) Tripp Isenhour	279	−9	3 strokes	(Australia) Paul Sheehan
