= Homer Kelley =

American sports writer and golfer

Homer Kelley (1907 – 1983) was the American writer of The Golfing Machine, one of the most comprehensive descriptions of the golf swing.

== Acknowledgements ==
In May 2005 Sports Illustrated magazine released the results of asking a cross section of Golf Magazine's Top 100 Teachers to vote on the most influential golf swing coaches ever, and came up with a consensus top 10. Homer Kelley ranked No.6 on that list.

Quotes: "He applied the principles of Physics to golf and opened everyone's eyes to the seemingly infinite ways to swing the club." and "Some feel The Golfing Machine is the most important golf book ever written, while others believe it's the most complicated".

== About The Golfing Machine ==
After Homer Kelley's death, his widow sold the rights to the term and the book The Golfing Machine (often abbreviated as TGM) to Chuck Evans, Joe Daniels and Danny Elkins. Elkins has since left The Golfing Machine Company to focus on managing his Atlanta-based teaching facility full-time and Evans operates ChuckEvansGolf.com Daniels now operates a teaching curriculum for all levels of golf instructors with several levels of certification, which was originally created somewhat informally by Homer Kelley. Therefore, "The Golfing Machine" now also refers to this program, which has produced approximately 225 Golfing Machine Authorized Instructors (AIs) around the world.

It is often reported to be difficult to understand the content of the book, which is sometimes attributed to not following the reading instructions stated in the book. As it is a book primarily targeted at expert golf instructors, it is expected that regular golfers would consult an AI rather than study the book. There are several instructors that are recognized as industry experts who regularly appear on industry lists of Top 100 Instructors, including Martin Hall, Chuck Cook, and Ben Doyle just to name a few.

“	Kelley was not a competitive golfer or even a teacher until later in life, but his book showed us how science could be applied to golf. The same laws that govern the universe also govern golf	”
– Mike Bennett and Andy Plummer on Homer Kelley's The Golfing Machine

Some past and present winners on the PGA Tour showed strong interest in TGM in view of improving their game, for example Steve Elkington, Bryson DeChambeau and Mac O'Grady. Canadian Tour winner John Erickson was a devoted student of TGM under the guidance of Ben Doyle and Greg Mc Hatton. LPGA superstar player Annika Sörenstam and (her coach Pia Nilsson) have acknowledged the influence of The Golfing Machine upon her excellent career.

== Quotes from The Golfing Machine ==
"Demanding that golf instruction be kept simple does not make it simple -- only incomplete and ineffective."—Introduction

SUSTAIN THE LAG!—Chapter 3

Principles are simple – sdf

== See also ==
- Stroke mechanics (golf)
