= 1999 Nike Tour graduates =

This is a list of players who graduated from the Nike Tour in 1999. The top 15 players on the Nike Tour's money list in 1999 earned their PGA Tour card for 2000.

	1999 Nike Tour		2000 PGA Tour				
Player	Money list rank	Earnings ($)	Starts	Cuts made	Best finish	Money list rank	Earnings ($)
(United States) Carl Paulson	1	223,051	31	16	T3	64	741,995
(United States) Joel Edwards	2	213,937	29	19	T3	73	638,422
(United States) Marco Dawson	3	201,219	11	5	T31	217	44,290
(Australia) Mathew Goggin*	4	187,894	32	12	T3	117	414,123
(England) Ed Fryatt*	5	186,356	32	17	T3	77	611,209
(United States) Bob Heintz*	6	180,222	34	9	T10	184	127,412
(United States) Matt Gogel*	7	180,173	30	12	T2	80	604,199
(Canada) Glen Hnatiuk	8	176,085	30	15	T3	101	482,744
(United States) Shaun Micheel	9	173,411	31	15	T5 (twice)	104	467,431
(United States) Ryan Howison	10	154,815	30	11	T29	193	99,149
(United States) Brad Elder*	11	146,263	34	20	T2	68	700,738
(United States) Jeff Gove*	12	129,692	31	11	T16	176	153,753
(United States) Kelly Gibson	13	128,134	30	12	T30	192	103,304
(United States) Casey Martin*	14	122,742	29	14	T17	179	143,248
(United States) Steve Gotsche	15	118,638	32	13	T12	173	164,203

*PGA Tour rookie for 2000.

T = Tied
Green background indicates the player retained his PGA Tour card for 2001 (finished inside the top 125).
Red background indicates the player did not retain his PGA Tour card for 2001 (finished outside the top 150).

== Runners-up on the PGA Tour in 2000 ==
No.	Date	Player	Tournament	Winner	Winning score	Runner-up score
1	Feb 6	(United States) Matt Gogel	AT&T Pebble Beach National Pro-Am	(United States) Tiger Woods	−15 (68-73-68-64=273)	−13 (69-68-67-71=275)
2	Sep 17	(United States) Brad Elder	SEI Pennsylvania Classic	(United States) Chris DiMarco	−14 (68-67-66-69=270)	−8 (69-69-68-70=276)

== See also ==
- 1999 PGA Tour Qualifying School graduates
