= 2004 PGA Tour Qualifying School graduates =

This is a list of the 35 players who earned their 2005 PGA Tour card through Q School in 2004.

Place	Player	PGA Tour starts	Cuts made	Notes
1	(England) Brian Davis	14	6	2 European Tour wins
2	(United States) Rob Rashell	0	0	
3	(United States) Danny Briggs	143	65	
T4	(United States) Paul Claxton	53	21	1 Nationwide Tour win
T4	(United States) Sean O'Hair	0	0	
T4	(United States) Bill Glasson	433	268	7 PGA Tour wins
T4	(United States) John Elliott	106	37	2 Nationwide Tour wins
T4	(England) Greg Owen	7	2	1 European Tour win
T9	(United States) Jason Bohn	31	21	1 Nationwide Tour win, 1 Canadian Tour win
T9	(United States) Roland Thatcher	25	9	1 Nationwide Tour win
T11	(United States) D. J. Trahan	8	1	1 Nationwide Tour win; played on 2001 Walker Cup team
T11	(United States) Matt Davidson	0	0	
T13	(United States) D. J. Brigman	27	12	1 Nationwide Tour win
T13	(United States) Jason Allred	2	0	
T13	(United States) Joey Snyder III	1	0	
T13	(United States) Dean Wilson	66	34	6 Japan Golf Tour wins
T13	(United States) Jim Carter	424	260	1 PGA Tour win
T13	(Wales) Phillip Price	41	25	3 European Tour wins, played on 2002 Ryder Cup team
T13	(United States) Carl Paulson	189	93	2 Nationwide Tour wins
T13	(United States) Jeff Brehaut	150	80	2 Nationwide Tour wins
T21	(United States) Bob Heintz	64	15	2 Nationwide Tour wins
T21	(Japan) Hideto Tanihara	4	3	2 Japan Golf Tour wins
T21	(United States) Mario Tiziani	14	3	
T21	(Canada) David Hearn	4	0	1 Nationwide Tour win, 1 Canadian Tour win
T21	(United States) Omar Uresti	227	117	1 Nationwide Tour win
T26	(United States) J. P. Hayes	263	143	2 PGA Tour wins
T26	(United States) Mark Wilson	57	27	
T26	(United States) Craig Barlow	188	102	
T26	(United States) Doug Barron	185	90	
T26	(United States) Tom Gillis	33	16	
T26	(United States) Lucas Glover	38	20	1 Nationwide Tour win; played on 2001 Walker Cup team
T26	(South Korea) Charlie Wi	1	1	6 Asian Tour wins
T26	(Australia) Scott Hend	29	11	1 Canadian Tour win
T26	(United States) Jeff Hart	157	75	1 Nationwide Tour win
T26	(United States) Will MacKenzie	0	0	0

- Players in yellow are 2005 PGA Tour rookies.

== 2005 Results ==
Player	Starts	Cuts made	Best finish	Money list rank	Earnings ($)
(England) Brian Davis*	23	15	T3	98	854,460
(United States) Rob Rashell*	25	6	T39	219	84,391
(United States) Danny Briggs	29	7	T9	208	148,836
(United States) Paul Claxton	29	11	T15	183	269,701
(United States) Sean O'Hair*	29	24	Win	18	2,461,482
(United States) Bill Glasson	21	7	T18	214	108,426
(United States) John Elliott	25	6	T39	221	67,819
(England) Greg Owen*	24	19	3	57	1,352,878
(United States) Jason Bohn	28	18	Win	35	1,888,568
(United States) Roland Thatcher	26	12	T8	173	326,299
(United States) D. J. Trahan*	28	14	9/T9 (twice)	103	806,304
(United States) Matt Davidson*	20	6	T14	218	98,906
(United States) D. J. Brigman	26	12	T12	177	294,849
(United States) Jason Allred*	29	8	T17	204	176,436
(United States) Joey Snyder III*	31	20	4	72	1,042,696
(United States) Dean Wilson	27	17	6	102	821,903
(United States) Jim Carter	25	6	T26	216	104,138
(Wales) Phillip Price*	25	13	11	157	419,415
(United States) Carl Paulson	13	6	T13	195	198,214
(United States) Jeff Brehaut	23	13	3	61	1,271,061
(United States) Bob Heintz	24	9	T5	171	355,488
(Japan) Hideto Tanihara*	20	6	T31	224	62,832
(United States) Mario Tiziani*	23	11	T12	200	181,618
(Canada) David Hearn*	24	10	13	196	197,453
(United States) Omar Uresti	27	16	T6	136	538,238
(United States) J. P. Hayes	22	10	T2	138	531,704
(United States) Mark Wilson	25	12	T3	133	573,218
(United States) Craig Barlow	26	15	T8	112	720,362
(United States) Doug Barron	24	11	T3	110	731,190
(United States) Tom Gillis	28	12	T11	156	421,050
(United States) Lucas Glover	28	16	Win	30	2,050,068
(South Korea) Charlie Wi*	23	11	T5	186	250,081
(Australia) Scott Hend	28	9	T6	170	356,427
(United States) Jeff Hart	23	13	T25	209	135,165
(United States) Will MacKenzie*	25	12	T8	179	275,529

*PGA Tour rookie in 2005
T = Tied
Green background indicates the player retained his PGA Tour card for 2006 (finished inside the top 125).
Yellow background indicates the player did not retain his PGA Tour card for 2006, but retained conditional status (finished between 126-150).
Red background indicates the player did not retain his PGA Tour card for 2006 (finished outside the top 150).

== Winners on the PGA Tour in 2005 ==
No.	Date	Player	Tournament	Winning score	Margin of victory	Runner(s)-up
1	Jul 10	(United States) Sean O'Hair	John Deere Classic	−16 (66-69-68-65=268)	1 stroke	(United States) Robert Damron, (United States) Hank Kuehne
2	Jul 17	(United States) Jason Bohn	B.C. Open	−24 (64-68-66-66=264)	1 stroke	(United States) J. P. Hayes, (Australia) Brendan Jones, (United States) Ryan Palmer, (United States) John Rollins
3	Oct 23	(United States) Lucas Glover	FUNAI Classic at the Walt Disney World Resort	−23 (68-66-66-65=265)	1 stroke	(United States) Tom Pernice Jr.

== Runners-up on the PGA Tour in 2005 ==
No.	Date	Player	Tournament	Winner	Winning score	Runner-up score
1	May 15	(United States) Sean O'Hair	EDS Byron Nelson Championship	(United States) Ted Purdy	−15 (65-67-68-65=265)	−14 (66-65-67-68=266)
2	Jul 17	(United States) J. P. Hayes	B.C. Open	(United States) Jason Bohn	−24 (64-68-66-66=264)	−23 (67-68-64-66=265)
3	Sep 5	(United States) Jason Bohn	Deutsche Bank Championship	(United States) Olin Browne	−14 (68-65-70-67=270)	−13 (68-68-67-68=271)

== See also ==
- 2004 Nationwide Tour graduates
