= Kevin Warrick =

American golfer

Kevin Warrick is a golfer that finished low amateur at the 2002 U.S. Open.

== College career ==
Warrick was individual runner-up at the 2001 NCAA Division II Men's Golf Championships while being a member of the team champions for University of West Florida. He was a two-time All-American.

== National championship play ==
=== 2000 U.S. Amateur ===
At the 2000 U.S. Amateur Warrick finished with low round of the day on the lower course at Baltusrol Golf Club.

=== 2002 U.S. Open ===
Warrick was the low amateur at the 2002 U.S. Open where he shot 27-over par and was the only amateur to make the cut. In the final round, he was paired with John Daly.

== Results in major championships ==
Tournament	2002
Masters Tournament	
U.S. Open	72LA
The Open Championship	
PGA Championship	

Did not play

LA = Low amateur
