= Ed Fryatt =

English golfer (born 1971)

Personal information
- Full name: Edward George Fryatt
- Nationality: England
- Born: 8 April 1971 (age 55) Rochdale, Lancashire, England
- Height: 6 ft 4 in (1.93 m)
- Weight: 190 lb (86 kg; 14 st)
- Spouses: Michelle (m. 1997, divorced) Kathleen (m. 2012)
- Children: 3

Career
- Sport: Golf
- College: University of Nevada, Las Vegas
- Turned professional: 1994
- Reinstated amateur: 2013
- Former tours: PGA Tour; Asian PGA Tour; Asia Golf Circuit; Nationwide Tour
- Professional wins: 6

Number of wins by tour
- Asian Tour: 1
- Korn Ferry Tour: 1
- Other: 4

Best results in major championships
- Masters Tournament: DNP
- PGA Championship: CUT: 2000
- U.S. Open: T24: 1997
- The Open Championship: DNP

Achievements and awards
- Asian PGA Tour Rookie of the Year: 1998

Edward George Fryatt (born 8 April 1971) is an English former professional golfer who played on the PGA Tour and the Asian PGA Tour.

== Early life ==
In 1971, Fryatt was born in Rochdale, England. At the age of four he moved with his family to Las Vegas, Nevada, where his father was coaching. He took up golf at the age of 13, before attending University of Nevada, Las Vegas in his home town, and turning professional when he graduated in 1994.

== Professional career ==
Fryatt joined the Nike Tour in 1995, but after an unsuccessful first season he opted to play in Asia, where he won five times in three years between the Asia Golf Circuit, the Asian PGA Tour and the Korean Tour. In 1999, he returned to the Nike Tour, and won once on his way to earning promotion to the PGA Tour for the first time.

In his debut PGA Tour season in 2000, Fryatt recorded five top-10 finishes, including a tie for third and finished 77th on the money list. He recorded two further top-10s in the 2001 season, but lost his playing rights after 2002. In 2003, he returned to the Nationwide Tour, but missed the cut in all eighteen events he played. His last appearance on either tour was in 2005.

At the 1997 U.S. Open, Fryatt became one of the few players in history to be penalised a stroke for slow play.

== Reinstated amateur status ==
In 2013, Fryatt applied and received his amateur status back from the USGA.

== Personal life ==
Fryatt's father, Jim, was a professional footballer for a number of English clubs.

Fryatt's ex-wife Michelle was named Mrs International in 2003. They have one adopted daughter together.

== Amateur wins ==
- 1994 NCAA West Regional

== Professional wins (6) ==
=== Asian PGA Tour wins (1) ===
No.	Date	Tournament	Winning score	Margin of victory	Runner-up
1	19 Apr 1998	Volvo China Open	−15 (69-65-69-66=269)	2 strokes	(Japan) Takeshi Ohyama

=== Asia Golf Circuit wins (3) ===
No.	Date	Tournament	Winning score	Margin of victory	Runner(s)-up
1	17 Mar 1996	Indonesia Open	−5 (67-65-68-71=271)	3 strokes	(Sweden) Daniel Chopra, (Canada) Jim Rutledge
2	30 Mar 1997	Classic Indian Open	−16 (63-69-67-73=272)	6 strokes	(United States) Gary Rusnak
3	22 Feb 1998	Benson & Hedges Malaysian Open	−10 (70-69-70-69=278)	Playoff	(England) Lee Westwood

Asia Golf Circuit playoff record (1–0)

No.	Year	Tournament	Opponent	Result
1	1998	Benson & Hedges Malaysian Open	(England) Lee Westwood	Won with par on second extra hole

=== Nike Tour wins (1) ===
No.	Date	Tournament	Winning score	Margin of victory	Runner-up
1	4 Jul 1999	Nike Hershey Open	−5 (69-67-69-70=275)	3 strokes	(United States) Brett Wayment

Nike Tour playoff record (0–1)

No.	Year	Tournament	Opponent	Result
1	1999	Nike Ozarks Open	(United States) Ryan Howison	Lost to par on first extra hole

=== Korean Tour wins (1) ===
No.	Date	Tournament	Winning score	Margin of victory	Runner-up
1	7 Sep 1997	Shinhan Donghae Open	−13 (66-69-68-72=275)	Playoff	(United States) Kevin Wentworth

Korean Tour playoff record (1–0)

No.	Year	Tournament	Opponent	Result
1	1997	Shinhan Donghae Open	(United States) Kevin Wentworth	Won with birdie on first extra hole

== Results in major championships ==
Tournament	1997	1998	1999	2000
U.S. Open	T24	CUT		CUT
PGA Championship				CUT

Did not play

CUT = missed the half-way cut
"T" = tied
Note: Fryatt never played in the Masters Tournament or The Open Championship.

== Results in The Players Championship ==
Tournament	2001	2002
The Players Championship	CUT	CUT

CUT = missed the halfway cut

== See also ==
- 1999 Nike Tour graduates
