= Bob Heintz =

American professional golfer (born 1970)

Personal information
- Full name: Robert Edward Heintz
- Nationality: United States
- Born: May 1, 1970 (age 56) Syosset, New York, U.S.
- Height: 6 ft 0 in (1.83 m)
- Weight: 215 lb (98 kg; 15.4 st)

Career
- Sport: Golf
- College: Yale University
- Turned professional: 1992
- Former tours: PGA Tour; Nationwide Tour; NGA Hooters Tour
- Professional wins: 3

Number of wins by tour
- Korn Ferry Tour: 2
- Other: 1

Best results in major championships
- Masters Tournament: DNP
- PGA Championship: DNP
- U.S. Open: CUT: 1999
- The Open Championship: DNP

Robert Edward Heintz (born May 1, 1970) is an American professional golfer who plays on the Nationwide Tour.

== Early life and amateur career ==
In 1970, Heintz was born in Syosset, New York. He played golf while attending Countryside High.

Heintz studied economics at Yale University. He was a three-time Ivy League champion for the Bulldogs golf team.

== Professional career ==
In 1992, Heintz turned professional. He joined the Nike Tour in 1994, then took a hiatus and did not return to the Tour until 1999. That year he won two events, the Nike Shreveport Open and the Nike Tour Championship, en route to finishing 6th on the money list and earning his PGA Tour card for the 2000 season. After a poor rookie year on Tour, he returned to the Nationwide Tour in 2001. However, he managed to successfully return to the PGA Tour at the end of the year through 2001 PGA Tour Qualifying School. In 2002, he did not retain his PGA Tour card, once again having a poor season, and returned to the Nationwide Tour. He played on the developmental circuit for two years before regaining his PGA Tour card once again at 2004 PGA Tour Qualifying School. However, he once more did not retain his card and returned to the Nationwide Tour in 2006.

Heintz successfully went through the 2006 PGA Tour Qualifying School. He returned to the PGA Tour in 2007 where he had his best year on tour, recording two fifth-place finishes and finishing 136th on the money list, earning him partial status on tour for 2008. He split the year between the PGA Tour and Nationwide Tour and earned his PGA Tour card for 2009 through qualifying school for the fourth time. He returned to the Nationwide Tour in 2010 and has been playing on it since.

Playing as a PGA Tour non-member out of the 151–200 money list category, Heintz had a very close call at the 2010 Reno-Tahoe Open where he missed a 3.5 foot (1.1 m) putt on the final hole to get into a playoff with Matt Bettencourt for an opportunity for his first PGA Tour victory.

Beginning in 2012, Heintz served as the University of Pennsylvania's men's head golf coach. He guided the Quakers to an Ivy League title in 2015. He joined the Duke University men's golf program in February 2017.

== Professional wins (3) ==
=== Nike Tour wins (2) ===
Legend
Tour Championships (1)
Other Nike Tour (4)

No.	Date	Tournament	Winning score	Margin of victory	Runner(s)-up
1	Apr 18, 1999	Nike Shreveport Open	−5 (72-67-72-72=283)	1 stroke	(United States) Craig Bowden, (United States) Joel Edwards
2	Oct 24, 1999	Nike Tour Championship	−5 (68-68-75-72=283)	Playoff	(United States) Marco Dawson

Nike Tour playoff record (1–0)

No.	Year	Tournament	Opponent	Result
1	1999	Nike Tour Championship	(United States) Marco Dawson	Won with birdie on first extra hole

=== NGA Hooters Tour wins (1) ===
No.	Date	Tournament	Winning score	Margin of victory	Runner-up
1	Jun 28, 1998	Decatur Classic	−17 (68-68-70-65=271)	Playoff	(United States) Scott Medlin

== See also ==
- 1999 Nike Tour graduates
- 2001 PGA Tour Qualifying School graduates
- 2004 PGA Tour Qualifying School graduates
- 2006 PGA Tour Qualifying School graduates
- 2008 PGA Tour Qualifying School graduates
