= Mississippi Gulf Coast Open =

Buy.com Mississippi Gulf Coast Open
Tournament information
- Location: Pass Christian, Mississippi
- Established: 1999
- Course: The Oaks Golf Club
- Par: 72
- Tour: Buy.com Tour
- Format: Stroke play
- Prize fund: $400,000
- Month played: March
- Final year: 2000

Tournament record score
- Aggregate: 279 Tripp Isenhour (2000)
- To par: −9 as above

Final champion
- (United States) Tripp Isenhour
- Location in the United States Location in Mississippi

The Mississippi Gulf Coast Open was a golf tournament on the Buy.com Tour from 1999 to 2000. It was played at The Oaks Golf Club in Pass Christian, Mississippi.

The purse in 2000 was $400,000, with $72,000 going to the winner.

== Winners ==
Year	Winner	Score	To par	Margin of victory	Runner-up	Ref
Nike Mississippi Gulf Coast Open
1999	(United States) Joel Edwards	280	−8	1 stroke	(United States) John Riegger	
Buy.com Mississippi Gulf Coast Open
2000	(United States) Tripp Isenhour	279	−9	2 strokes	(United States) John Elliott	

== See also ==
- Mississippi Gulf Coast Classic - an earlier Mississippi Gulf Coast tournament
