= 2002 PGA Tour =

Golf tour season

2002 PGA Tour season
- Duration: January 3, 2002 – November 4, 2002
- Number of official events: 49
- Most wins: (United States) Tiger Woods (5)
- Money list: (United States) Tiger Woods
- PGA Tour Player of the Year: (United States) Tiger Woods
- PGA Player of the Year: (United States) Tiger Woods
- Rookie of the Year: (United States) Jonathan Byrd

The 2002 PGA Tour was the 87th season of the PGA Tour, the main professional golf tour in the United States. It was also the 34th season since separating from the PGA of America.

== Schedule ==
The following table lists official events during the 2002 season.

Date	Tournament	Location	Purse (US$)	Winner (Note: The number in parentheses after each winner's name is the number of PGA Tour events they had won up to and including that tournament. This information is only shown for PGA Tour members.)	OWGR points	Notes
Jan 6	Mercedes Championships	Hawaii	4,000,000	(Spain) Sergio García (3)	56	Winners-only event
Jan 14	Sony Open in Hawaii	Hawaii	4,000,000	(United States) Jerry Kelly (1)	50	
Jan 20	Bob Hope Chrysler Classic	California	4,000,000	(United States) Phil Mickelson (20)	54	Pro-Am
Jan 27	Phoenix Open	Arizona	4,000,000	(United States) Chris DiMarco (3)	58	
Feb 3	AT&T Pebble Beach National Pro-Am	California	4,000,000	(United States) Matt Gogel (1)	54	Pro-Am
Feb 10	Buick Invitational	California	3,600,000	(Spain) José María Olazábal (6)	48	
Feb 17	Nissan Open	California	3,700,000	(United States) Len Mattiace (1)	62	
Feb 24	WGC-Accenture Match Play Championship	California	5,500,000	(United States) Kevin Sutherland (1)	78	World Golf Championship
Feb 24	Touchstone Energy Tucson Open	Arizona	3,000,000	(Canada) Ian Leggatt (1)	24	Alternate event
Mar 3	Genuity Championship	Florida	4,700,000	(South Africa) Ernie Els (9)	60	
Mar 10	The Honda Classic	Florida	3,500,000	(United States) Matt Kuchar (1)	50	
Mar 17	Bay Hill Invitational	Florida	4,000,000	(United States) Tiger Woods (30)	70	Invitational
Mar 24	The Players Championship	Florida	6,000,000	(New Zealand) Craig Perks (1)	80	Flagship event
Mar 31	Shell Houston Open	Texas	4,000,000	(Fiji) Vijay Singh (10)	54	
Apr 7	BellSouth Classic	Georgia	3,800,000	(South Africa) Retief Goosen (2)	56	
Apr 14	Masters Tournament	Georgia	5,600,000	(United States) Tiger Woods (31)	100	Major championship
Apr 21	WorldCom Classic - The Heritage of Golf	South Carolina	4,000,000	(United States) Justin Leonard (7)	58	Invitational
Apr 28	Greater Greensboro Chrysler Classic	North Carolina	3,800,000	(United States) Rocco Mediate (5)	30	
May 5	Compaq Classic of New Orleans	Louisiana	4,500,000	(South Korea) K. J. Choi (1)	52	
May 12	Verizon Byron Nelson Classic	Texas	4,800,000	(Japan) Shigeki Maruyama (2)	68	
May 19	MasterCard Colonial	Texas	4,300,000	(Zimbabwe) Nick Price (18)	66	Invitational
May 26	Memorial Tournament	Ohio	4,500,000	(United States) Jim Furyk (7)	64	Invitational
Jun 2	Kemper Insurance Open	Maryland	3,600,000	(United States) Bob Estes (4)	30	
Jun 9	Buick Classic	New York	3,500,000	(United States) Chris Smith (1)	64	
Jun 16	U.S. Open	New York	5,500,000	(United States) Tiger Woods (32)	100	Major championship
Jun 23	Canon Greater Hartford Open	Connecticut	4,000,000	(United States) Phil Mickelson (21)	56	
Jun 30	FedEx St. Jude Classic	Tennessee	3,800,000	(United States) Len Mattiace (2)	32	
Jul 7	Advil Western Open	Illinois	4,000,000	(United States) Jerry Kelly (2)	52	
Jul 14	Greater Milwaukee Open	Wisconsin	3,100,000	(United States) Jeff Sluman (6)	24	
Jul 21	The Open Championship	Scotland	£3,800,000	(South Africa) Ernie Els (10)	100	Major championship
Jul 21	B.C. Open	New York	2,100,000	(United States) Spike McRoy (1)	24	Alternate event
Jul 28	John Deere Classic	Illinois	3,000,000	(United States) J. P. Hayes (2)	24	
Aug 4	The International	Colorado	4,500,000	(United States) Rich Beem (2)	56	
Aug 11	Buick Open	Michigan	3,300,000	(United States) Tiger Woods (33)	56	
Aug 18	PGA Championship	Minnesota	5,500,000	(United States) Rich Beem (3)	100	Major championship
Aug 25	WGC-NEC Invitational	Washington	5,500,000	(Australia) Craig Parry (1)	76	World Golf Championship
Aug 25	Reno–Tahoe Open	Nevada	3,000,000	(United States) Chris Riley (1)	24	Alternate event
Sep 1	Air Canada Championship	Canada	3,500,000	(United States) Gene Sauers (3)	38	
Sep 8	Bell Canadian Open	Canada	4,000,000	(United States) John Rollins (1)	34	
Sep 15	SEI Pennsylvania Classic	Pennsylvania	3,300,000	(United States) Dan Forsman (5)	32	
Sep 22	WGC-American Express Championship	Ireland	5,500,000	(United States) Tiger Woods (34)	76	World Golf Championship
Sep 22	Tampa Bay Classic	Florida	2,600,000	(South Korea) K. J. Choi (2)	24	Alternate event
Sep 29	Valero Texas Open	Texas	3,500,000	(United States) Loren Roberts (8)	24	
Oct 6	Michelob Championship at Kingsmill	Virginia	3,700,000	(United States) Charles Howell III (1)	42	
Oct 13	Invensys Classic at Las Vegas	Nevada	5,000,000	(New Zealand) Phil Tataurangi (1)	50	
Oct 20	Disney Golf Classic	Florida	3,700,000	(United States) Bob Burns (1)	58	
Oct 27	Buick Challenge	Georgia	3,700,000	(United States) Jonathan Byrd (1)	56	
Nov 3	The Tour Championship	Georgia	5,000,000	(Fiji) Vijay Singh (11)	64	Tour Championship
Nov 4	Southern Farm Bureau Classic	Mississippi	2,600,000	(England) Luke Donald (1)	24	Alternate event

=== Unofficial events ===
The following events were sanctioned by the PGA Tour, but did not carry official money, nor were wins official.

Date	Tournament	Location	Purse ($)	Winner(s)	Notes
Jun 25	CVS Charity Classic	Rhode Island	1,200,000	(United States) Chris DiMarco and (United States) Dudley Hart	Team event
Sep 29	Ryder Cup	England	n/a	Team Europe	Team event
Nov 17	Hyundai Team Matches	California	400,000	(United States) Rich Beem and (Australia) Peter Lonard	Team event
Nov 24	Franklin Templeton Shootout	Florida	2,250,000	(United States) Lee Janzen and (United States) Rocco Mediate	Team event
Nov 27	PGA Grand Slam of Golf	Hawaii	1,000,000	(United States) Tiger Woods	Limited-field event
Dec 1	Skins Game	California	1,000,000	(United States) Mark O'Meara	Limited-field event
Dec 8	Target World Challenge	California	3,860,000	(Republic of Ireland) Pádraig Harrington	Limited-field event
Dec 15	WGC-World Cup	Mexico	3,000,000	(Japan) Toshimitsu Izawa and (Japan) Shigeki Maruyama	World Golf Championship; Team event

== Location of tournaments ==
Location of official tournaments of the 2002 PGA Tour in the continental United States and Canada.
Players & Majors
World Golf Championships
Regular events
Alternate events
Tour Championship
Location of official tournaments of the 2002 PGA Tour outside the continental United States and Canada.
Players & Majors
World Golf Championships
Regular events

== Money list ==
The money list was based on prize money won during the season, calculated in U.S. dollars.

Position	Player	Prize money ($)
1	(United States) Tiger Woods	6,912,625
2	(United States) Phil Mickelson	4,311,971
3	(Fiji) Vijay Singh	3,756,563
4	(United States) David Toms	3,459,739
5	(South Africa) Ernie Els	3,291,895
6	(United States) Jerry Kelly	2,946,889
7	(United States) Rich Beem	2,938,365
8	(United States) Justin Leonard	2,738,235
9	(United States) Charles Howell III	2,702,747
10	(South Africa) Retief Goosen	2,617,004

== Awards ==
Award	Winner	Ref.
PGA Tour Player of the Year (Jack Nicklaus Trophy)	(United States) Tiger Woods	
PGA Player of the Year	(United States) Tiger Woods	
Rookie of the Year	(United States) Jonathan Byrd	
Scoring leader (PGA Tour – Byron Nelson Award)	(United States) Tiger Woods	
Scoring leader (PGA – Vardon Trophy)	(United States) Tiger Woods	
Comeback Player of the Year	(United States) Gene Sauers	

== See also ==
- 2002 Buy.com Tour
- 2002 Senior PGA Tour
