= 2011 Nationwide Tour =

Golf tour season

2011 Nationwide Tour season
- Duration: February 24, 2011 – October 30, 2011
- Number of official events: 26
- Most wins: (Australia) Mathew Goggin (2) (United States) J. J. Killeen (2) (United States) Jason Kokrak (2) (United States) Ted Potter Jr. (2)
- Money list: (United States) J. J. Killeen
- Player of the Year: (United States) J. J. Killeen

The 2011 Nationwide Tour was the 22nd season of the Nationwide Tour, the official development tour to the PGA Tour.

== Schedule ==
The following table lists official events during the 2011 season.

Date	Tournament	Location	Purse (US$)	Winner (Note: The number in parentheses after each winner's name is the number of Nationwide Tour events they had won up to and including that tournament. This information is only shown for Nationwide Tour members. It is rare for someone to accumulate many wins on the Nationwide Tour as success at this level usually leads to promotion to the PGA Tour.)	OWGR points	Notes
Feb 27	Panama Claro Championship	Panama	550,000	(Australia) Mathew Goggin (3)	14	
Mar 6	Pacific Rubiales Bogotá Open	Colombia	600,000	(South Africa) Brenden Pappas (n/a)	10	Unofficial win (Note: Shortened to 36 holes due to weather. Due to the event's length, this win is not officially recognized as a Nationwide Tour victory.)
Mar 27	Chitimacha Louisiana Open	Louisiana	500,000	(United States) Brett Wetterich (3)	14	
Apr 17	Fresh Express Classic	California	600,000	(Sweden) Daniel Chopra (3)	14	
May 1	South Georgia Classic	Georgia	625,000	(United States) Ted Potter Jr. (1)	14	
May 8	Stadion Classic at UGA	Georgia	550,000	(United States) Russell Henley (a) (1)	14	
May 22	BMW Charity Pro-Am	South Carolina	600,000	(South Africa) Garth Mulroy (2)	14	Pro-Am
Jun 5	Melwood Prince George's County Open	Maryland	600,000	(United States) Steve Wheatcroft (1)	14	
Jun 12	Rex Hospital Open	North Carolina	550,000	(United States) Kyle Thompson (3)	14	
Jun 19	Preferred Health Systems Wichita Open	Kansas	600,000	(Australia) Mathew Goggin (4)	14	
Jun 26	Mexico Open	Mexico	700,000	(United States) Erik Compton (1)	14	
Jul 17	Chiquita Classic	Ohio	550,000	(Scotland) Russell Knox (1)	14	
Jul 24	Nationwide Children's Hospital Invitational	Ohio	800,000	(United States) Harris English (a) (1)	14	
Jul 31	Utah Championship	Utah	550,000	(United States) J. J. Killeen (1)	14	
Aug 7	Cox Classic	Nebraska	725,000	(United States) J. J. Killeen (2)	14	
Aug 14	Price Cutter Charity Championship	Missouri	625,000	(United States) Steve Friesen (1)	14	
Aug 21	Midwest Classic	Kansas	550,000	(Australia) James Nitties (1)	14	
Aug 28	News Sentinel Open	Tennessee	500,000	(United States) Kirk Triplett (1)	14	
Sep 4	Mylan Classic	Pennsylvania	600,000	(England) Gary Christian (2)	14	
Sep 18	Albertsons Boise Open	Idaho	725,000	(United States) Jason Kokrak (1)	14	
Sep 25	Soboba Golf Classic	California	750,000	(United States) Ted Potter Jr. (2)	14	
Oct 2	WNB Golf Classic	Texas	525,000	(New Zealand) Danny Lee (1)	14	
Oct 9	Children's Hospital Classic	Tennessee	500,000	(Argentina) Miguel Ángel Carballo (2)	14	
Oct 16	Miccosukee Championship	Florida	600,000	(United States) Jason Kokrak (2)	14	
Oct 23	Winn-Dixie Jacksonville Open	Florida	600,000	(Australia) Gavin Coles (5)	14	
Oct 30	Nationwide Tour Championship	South Carolina	1,000,000	(United States) Ken Duke (2)	20	Tour Championship

== Money list ==
The money list was based on prize money won during the season, calculated in U.S. dollars. The top 25 players on the money list earned status to play on the 2012 PGA Tour.

Position	Player	Prize money ($)
1	(United States) J. J. Killeen	414,273
2	(United States) Ted Potter Jr.	402,470
3	(Australia) Mathew Goggin	378,492
4	(United States) Jason Kokrak	338,092
5	(Sweden) Jonas Blixt	327,020

== Awards ==
Award	Winner	Ref.
Player of the Year (Jack Nicklaus Trophy)	(United States) J. J. Killeen	
