= Ty Tryon =

American professional golfer (born 1984)

Personal information
- Full name: William Augustus Tryon IV
- Nationality: United States
- Born: June 2, 1984 (age 42) Raleigh, North Carolina, U.S.
- Height: 6 ft 0 in (1.83 m)
- Weight: 180 lb (82 kg; 13 st)

Career
- Sport: Golf
- Turned professional: 2001
- Former tours: PGA Tour; Web.com Tour
- Professional wins: 1

Best results in major championships
- Masters Tournament: DNP
- PGA Championship: DNP
- U.S. Open: T80: 2010
- The Open Championship: DNP

William Augustus "Ty" Tryon IV (born June 2, 1984) is an American professional golfer.

== Early life and amateur career ==
Tryon was born in Raleigh, North Carolina. Tryon's nickname, Ty, is derived from Chevy Chase's character "Ty Webb" in the movie Caddyshack. He was coached at the David Leadbetter Academy in Florida.

As an amateur in 2001, he made the cut at the PGA Tour's Honda Classic, making him, at the time, the third-youngest player ever to make the cut in a PGA Tour event (16 years, 9 months, 7 days). He is now the eighth-youngest.

== Professional career ==
In 2001, Tryon turned professional at the age of 16, which caused some controversy as typically American golfers attend college before turning pro.

At age 17 while still a student at Lake Highland Preparatory School, Tryon survived qualifying for the PGA Tour in the fall of 2001 finishing T23. He made his way through the three levels of elimination events to become the youngest player to earn exempt status in this manner. Following his qualification, he signed a lucrative endorsement deal with Callaway, estimated in the several millions of dollars.

Since qualifying, Tryon has failed to hold on to PGA Tour status. He struggled in his first full Tour season in 2002 battling mononucleosis, failing to make the cut in six out of seven events. He spent 2003 on a medical exemption on the PGA Tour and Tryon made his best finish on the tour that year by placing in a tie for 10th at the Bay Hill Invitational, earning $93,375. Tryon made the cut in just three other PGA Tour events in 2003. By the end of 2003, Tryon finished 89th place at the Chrysler Classic of Greensboro, this would be the last time he would make the cut at a PGA Tour event until 2010. Tryon earned a total of $125,875 in 2003 and finished 196th on the PGA's money list for that season.

Tryon also spent time on several other tours. His first professional win came at a NGA Hooters Tour winter series event in February 2005. when a final-round 67 earned him the first prize of $11,000 and he finished 18 under par. In 2007 he was playing on the Gateway Tour having two top 25 finishes. In early May 2008, having gained entry into the Fort Smith Classic on the Nationwide Tour as a Monday qualifier. He shot 67-69-72-72 to tie for 37th.

On June 7, 2010, Tryon qualified for the U.S. Open at Pebble Beach, by shooting 64-74 in sectional qualifying at Woodmont Country Club in Rockville, Maryland. The tournament marked Tryon's first major championship appearance, and first appearance on the PGA Tour since the 2003 FUNAI Classic, He made the cut after two rounds and finished tied for 80th, 23 strokes over-par, earning $12,293.

Tryon accepted an invitation to play in the 2010 Alstom Open de France, one of the biggest events on the European Tour. He finished towards the bottom of the 156-man field, missing the cut at 13-over-par.

In December 2010, Tryon made it to the finals of the PGA Tour Qualifying School for the first time since 2001. He finished tied for 114th place after six rounds, resulting in conditional playing status on the Nationwide Tour for 2011.

Tryon did not gain entry to a Nationwide Tour event until the Rex Hospital Open in June, but made fairly regular appearances in tournaments from then on. In all, he played in nine Nationwide Tour events during the season. He tied 29th at his first event, but did not make another cut in the following eight he played. The $3,713 Tryon made placed him 228th on the final 2011 money list.

During the course of 2011, Tryon again qualified for the U.S. Open, this time at Congressional. Rounds of 84-73 saw him miss the cut.

In December, Tryon reached the finals of Q School for the second year in a row, this time finishing in 158th place and again earning conditional status for the 2012 Web.com Tour.

In addition, Tryon has been featured in the Tiger Woods PGA Tour game series.

== Personal life ==
Tryon is married with a child.

== Professional wins (1) ==
- One win on the NGA Hooters Tour

== Results in major championships ==
Tournament	2010	2011
U.S. Open	T80	CUT

Note: Tryon only played in the U.S. Open.
CUT = missed the half-way cut
"T" indicates a tie for a place

== U.S. national team appearances ==
Amateur

- Junior Ryder Cup: 1999

== See also ==
- 2001 PGA Tour Qualifying School graduates
