= Greater Vancouver Open =

Canadian golf tournament

Coordinates: 49.125°N 122.765°W

Air Canada Championship
Tournament information
- Location: Surrey, British Columbia, Canada
- Established: 1958
- Courses: Northview Golf & Country Club (Ridge Course)
- Par: 71
- Length: 7,065 yards (6,460 m)
- Tour: PGA Tour
- Format: Stroke play
- Prize fund: US$3,500,000
- Month played: August/September
- Final year: 2002

Tournament record score
- Aggregate: 265 Mark Calcavecchia (1997); 265 Brandel Chamblee (1998); 265 Joel Edwards (2001)
- To par: −19 as above

Final champion
- (United States) Gene Sauers
- Location in Canada Location in British Columbia

The Greater Vancouver Open was a professional golf tournament in Canada on the PGA Tour, held in southwestern British Columbia from 1996 to 2002. It was played after the majors in late summer, at the Northview Golf & Country Club in Surrey, a suburb southeast of Vancouver.

== History ==
For its first three years, it was an alternate event in late August, concurrent with the NEC World Series of Golf at Firestone in Akron, Ohio. In 1999, the new Reno-Tahoe Open became the alternate event for the WGC-NEC Invitational at Firestone. The Vancouver tournament was promoted to a regular tour event and scheduled a week later, as the Greater Milwaukee Open moved up to July. Renamed the "Air Canada Championship," sponsored by the country's leading airline, it was coupled with the Canadian Open for consecutive tournaments north of the U.S. border in early September.

Mike Weir won that year for the first of his eight tour wins; he became the first Canadian to win a PGA Tour event on home soil in 45 years.

The purses grew substantially during the run of the event, from $1 million to $3.5 million in six years. It was replaced on the schedule in 2003 by the Deutsche Bank Championship in Massachusetts, near Boston.

This was not the first time the PGA Tour included a stop in British Columbia on their schedule. Dow Finsterwald won the unofficial 1955 British Columbia Open Invitational, and Jim Ferree was victorious at the 1958 Vancouver Open Invitational.

== Winners ==
Year	Winner	Score	To par	Margin of victory	Runner(s)-up	Purse (US$)	Winner's share ($)	Ref.
Air Canada Championship
2002	(United States) Gene Sauers	269	−15	1 stroke	(United States) Steve Lowery	3,500,000	630,000	
2001	(United States) Joel Edwards	265	−19	7 strokes	(United States) Steve Lowery	3,400,000	612,000	
2000	(South Africa) Rory Sabbatini	268	−16	1 stroke	(New Zealand) Grant Waite	3,000,000	540,000	
1999	(Canada) Mike Weir	266	−18	2 strokes	(United States) Fred Funk	2,500,000	450,000	
Greater Vancouver Open
1998	(United States) Brandel Chamblee	265	−19	3 strokes	(United States) Payne Stewart	2,000,000	360,000	
1997	(United States) Mark Calcavecchia	265	−19	1 stroke	(United States) Andrew Magee	1,500,000	270,000	
1996	(United States) Guy Boros	272	−12	1 stroke	(United States) Emlyn Aubrey (United States) Lee Janzen (United States) Taylor Smith	1,000,000	180,000	
1959–1995: No tournament
Vancouver Open Invitational
1958	(United States) Jim Ferree	270	−18	1 stroke	(United States) Billy Casper	42,000	6,400	
