= Ken Staton =

American golfer

Personal information
- Full name: Kenneth Staton
- Nationality: United States
- Born: November 25, 1972 (age 53) Ormond Beach, Florida, U.S.
- Height: 6 ft 0 in (1.83 m)
- Weight: 170 lb (77 kg; 12 st)

Career
- Sport: Golf
- College: Florida State University
- Turned professional: 1995
- Former tours: PGA Tour; Nationwide Tour; Canadian Tour
- Professional wins: 6

Kenneth Staton (born November 25, 1972) is an American professional golfer.

Staton played college golf at Florida State University, where he was chosen after his senior year as an honorable mention All-American by the Golf Coaches Association of America.

Staton began his professional career on the Canadian Tour, where he won six times. He finished second at the 2001 Qualifying school, giving him status on the PGA Tour. He would go on to play 60 events on tour, as well as 61 events on the Web.com Tour.

Staton has been the head coach at Embry–Riddle Aeronautical University since 2010.

== Professional wins (6) ==
=== Canadian Tour wins (5) ===
No.	Date	Tournament	Winning score	Margin of victory	Runner(s)-up
1	May 23, 1999	Crown Isle Open	−15 (69-67-68-69=273)	4 strokes	(United States) Darren Griff
2	Jun 6, 1999	BC TEL Pacific Open	−15 (66-67-70-66=269)	2 strokes	(United States) Steve Woods
3	Aug 15, 1999	AmEx-SAQ Championship	−5 (74-70-68-71=283)	Playoff	(Canada) Todd Fanning, (United States) Ray Freeman
4	Jul 15, 2001	MTS Classic	−18 (70-68-64-64=266)	1 stroke	(Canada) Mark Slawter
5	Sep 23, 2001	Niagara Classic	−10 (67-67=134)	1 stroke	(Australia) Nathan Green

=== Other wins (1) ===
- 1999 Benefit Partners–NRCS Classic (Canada, non-tour event)

== See also ==
- 2001 PGA Tour Qualifying School graduates
