= Aron Price =

Australian professional golfer

Personal information
- Nationality: Australia
- Born: 6 May 1982 (age 44) Sydney, Australia
- Height: 6 ft 0 in (1.83 m)
- Weight: 160 lb (73 kg; 11 st)

Career
- Sport: Golf
- College: Georgia Southern University
- Turned professional: 2005
- Former tours: PGA Tour; PGA Tour of Australasia; Web.com Tour; Gateway Tour
- Professional wins: 4

Number of wins by tour
- PGA Tour of Australasia: 1
- Korn Ferry Tour: 1
- Other: 2

Best results in major championships
- Masters Tournament: DNP
- PGA Championship: DNP
- U.S. Open: CUT: 2014, 2016
- The Open Championship: DNP

Aron Price (born 6 May 1982) is an Australian professional golfer.

== Career ==
Price was born in Sydney, Australia. He played college golf at Georgia Southern University and turned professional in 2005. Price was a member of the Nationwide Tour from 2006 to 2008. In 2008 he finished 18th on the money list and earned his PGA Tour card for 2009.

== Amateur wins ==
- 2004 Rice Planters Amateur, Players Amateur

== Professional wins (4) ==
=== PGA Tour of Australasia wins (1) ===
No.	Date	Tournament	Winning score	Margin of victory	Runners-up
1	24 Nov 2013	Gloria Jean's Coffees NSW Open	−19 (66-66-67-70=269)	4 strokes	(Australia) Adam Bland, (Australia) Aaron Townsend, (Australia) Jack Wilson

=== Nationwide Tour wins (1) ===
No.	Date	Tournament	Winning score	Margin of victory	Runner-up
1	6 Apr 2008	Livermore Valley Wine Country Championship	−5 (70-69-72-72=283)	Playoff	(United States) J. J. Killeen

Nationwide Tour playoff record (1–1)

No.	Year	Tournament	Opponent	Result
1	2006	Permian Basin Charity Golf Classic	(United States) Brandt Snedeker	Lost to birdie on first extra hole
2	2008	Livermore Valley Wine Country Championship	(United States) J. J. Killeen	Won with par on second extra hole

=== Gateway Tour wins (2) ===
No.	Date	Tournament	Winning score	Margin of victory	Runner(s)-up
1	24 Jun 2005	Beach Series 4	−20 (67-70-66-65=268)	1 stroke	(United States) Michael Adamson
2	9 Sep 2005	Beach Series 12	−15 (70-70-65-68=273)	4 strokes	(United States) Tommy Gainey, (United States) Jeremy Pope

== See also ==
- 2008 Nationwide Tour graduates
