= 1999 Nike Tour =

Golf tour season

1999 Nike Tour season
- Duration: January 7, 1999 – October 24, 1999
- Number of official events: 30
- Most wins: (United States) Brad Elder (2) (United States) Matt Gogel (2) (Australia) Mathew Goggin (2) (United States) Steve Gotsche (2) (United States) Bob Heintz (2) (United States) Ryan Howison (2) (United States) Carl Paulson (2)
- Money list: (United States) Carl Paulson
- Player of the Year: (United States) Carl Paulson

The 1999 Nike Tour was the 10th season of the Nike Tour, the official development tour to the PGA Tour.

== Schedule ==
The following table lists official events during the 1999 season.

Date	Tournament	Location	Purse (US$)	Winner (Note: The number in parentheses after each winner's name is the number of Nike Tour events they had won up to and including that tournament. This information is only shown for Nike Tour members. It is rare for someone to accumulate many wins on the Nike Tour as success at this level usually leads to promotion to the PGA Tour.)	Notes
Jan 10	Nike South Florida Classic	Florida	225,000	(United States) Curt Byrum (2)	
Jan 17	Nike Lakeland Classic	Florida	225,000	(United States) Ryan Howison (2)	
Feb 7	Nike Florida Classic	Florida	225,000	(Wales) Richard Johnson (1)	New tournament
Feb 21	Nike Mississippi Gulf Coast Open	Mississippi	250,000	(United States) Joel Edwards (1)	New tournament
Mar 21	Nike Monterrey Open	Mexico	275,000	(United States) Steve Gotsche (1)	
Mar 28	Nike Louisiana Open	Louisiana	300,000	(United States) Matt Gogel (5)	
Apr 18	Nike Shreveport Open	Louisiana	225,000	(United States) Bob Heintz (1)	
Apr 25	Nike South Carolina Classic	South Carolina	225,000	(United States) Kevin Johnson (2)	
May 2	Nike Upstate Classic	South Carolina	225,000	(United States) Steve Gotsche (2)	
May 9	Nike Carolina Classic	North Carolina	225,000	(United States) Vance Veazey (2)	
May 16	Nike Dominion Open	Virginia	250,000	(United States) Darron Stiles (1)	
May 23	Nike Knoxville Open	Tennessee	225,000	(United States) Jeff Gove (2)	
Jun 13	Nike Cleveland Open	Ohio	225,000	(United States) Matt Gogel (6)	
Jun 20	Nike Dayton Open	Ohio	250,000	(United States) John Wilson (2)	New tournament
Jun 27	Nike Lehigh Valley Open	Pennsylvania	225,000	(Australia) Mathew Goggin (1)	
Jul 4	Nike Hershey Open	Pennsylvania	225,000	(England) Ed Fryatt (1)	
Jul 11	Nike Greensboro Open	North Carolina	225,000	(United States) Shaun Micheel (1)	
Jul 25	Nike Wichita Open	Kansas	225,000	(United States) Brad Elder (1)	
Aug 1	Nike Dakota Dunes Open	South Dakota	350,000	(United States) Fran Quinn (1)	
Aug 8	Nike Omaha Classic	Nebraska	300,000	(Australia) Mathew Goggin (2)	
Aug 15	Nike Ozarks Open	Missouri	250,000	(United States) Ryan Howison (3)	
Aug 22	Nike Fort Smith Classic	Arkansas	250,000	(United States) Gary Webb (2)	
Aug 29	Nike Permian Basin Open	Texas	225,000	(United States) David Berganio Jr. (2)	
Sep 5	Nike Utah Classic	Utah	375,000	(United States) Carl Paulson (1)	
Sep 12	Nike Tri-Cities Open	Washington	225,000	(Canada) Glen Hnatiuk (4)	
Sep 19	Nike Boise Open	Idaho	325,000	(United States) Carl Paulson (2)	
Sep 26	Nike Oregon Classic	Oregon	225,000	(United States) Kelly Gibson (2)	
Oct 3	Nike Inland Empire Open	California	225,000	(United States) Brad Elder (2)	
Oct 10	Nike New Mexico Classic	New Mexico	225,000	(United States) Dick Mast (4)	New tournament
Oct 24	Nike Tour Championship	Alabama	400,000	(United States) Bob Heintz (2)	Tour Championship

== Money list ==
The money list was based on prize money won during the season, calculated in U.S. dollars. The top 15 players on the money list earned status to play on the 2000 PGA Tour.

Position	Player	Prize money ($)
1	(United States) Carl Paulson	223,051
2	(United States) Joel Edwards	213,937
3	(United States) Marco Dawson	201,219
4	(Australia) Mathew Goggin	187,894
5	(England) Ed Fryatt	186,356

== Awards ==
Award	Winner	Ref.
Player of the Year (Jack Nicklaus Trophy)	(United States) Carl Paulson	
