= Greensboro Open =

Buy.com Greensboro Open
Tournament information
- Location: Greensboro, North Carolina
- Established: 1998
- Course: Sedgefield Country Club
- Par: 70
- Tour: Buy.com Tour
- Format: Stroke play
- Prize fund: US$400,000
- Month played: June
- Final year: 2000

Tournament record score
- Aggregate: 266 Joe Ogilvie (1998)
- To par: −14 as above

Final champion
- (United States) Kent Jones
- Location in the United States Location in North Carolina

The Greensboro Open was a golf tournament on the Buy.com Tour from 1998 to 2000. It was played at the Sedgefield Country Club in Greensboro, North Carolina.

The purse in 2000 was US$400,000, with $72,000 going to the winner.

== Winners ==
Year	Winner	Score	To par	Margin of victory	Runner(s)-up
Buy.com Greensboro Open
2000	(United States) Kent Jones	263	−17	3 strokes	(United States) Jay Hobby (United States) Charles Howell III
Nike Greensboro Open
1999	(United States) Shaun Micheel	269	−11	1 stroke	(United States) Garrett Willis
1998	(United States) Joe Ogilvie	266	−14	4 strokes	(United States) Chris Zambri
