= Kent Jones (golfer) =

American golfer (born 1967)

Personal information
- Nationality: United States
- Born: January 8, 1967 (age 59) Portales, New Mexico, U.S.
- Height: 5 ft 8 in (1.73 m)
- Weight: 150 lb (68 kg; 11 st)

Career
- Sport: Golf
- College: University of New Mexico
- Turned professional: 1992
- Current tour: PGA Tour Champions
- Former tours: PGA Tour; Web.com Tour
- Professional wins: 2

Number of wins by tour
- Korn Ferry Tour: 2

Best results in major championships
- Masters Tournament: DNP
- PGA Championship: DNP
- U.S. Open: T48: 2006
- The Open Championship: DNP

Kent Jones (born January 8, 1967) is an American professional golfer.

== Career ==
Jones was born in Portales, New Mexico. He graduated from the University of New Mexico with a bachelor's (1990) and master's (1991) degree in business administration. He turned professional in 1992.

Jones has played on the Canadian Tour (1993–94), the Hooters Tour (1995), the Nationwide Tour (1996–97, 2000, 2010, 2012–13), and the PGA Tour (1998–99, 2001–09). He has two wins on the Web.com Tour, both coming in 2000.

Jones career best placed finish on the PGA Tour is a T6 at the 2006 84 Lumber Classic. His career earnings are over $5.3 million.

== Professional wins (2) ==
=== Buy.com Tour wins (2) ===
No.	Date	Tournament	Winning score	Margin of victory	Runners-up
1	Apr 16, 2000	Buy.com Shreveport Open	−15 (70-64-70-69=273)	1 stroke	(United States) Keith Clearwater, (United States) Tripp Isenhour
2	Jun 25, 2000	Buy.com Greensboro Open	−17 (66-66-67-64=263)	3 strokes	(United States) Jay Hobby, (United States) Charles Howell III

== Results in major championships ==
Tournament	1996	1997	1998	1999	2000	2001	2002	2003	2004	2005	2006	2007	2008	2009	2010
U.S. Open	T82	CUT					T68	CUT			T48				T74

Did not play

CUT = missed the half-way cut
"T" = tied
Note: Jones only played in the U.S. Open.

== Results in The Players Championship ==
Tournament	2004	2005	2006	2007
The Players Championship	CUT	T75	CUT	CUT

CUT = missed the halfway cut
"T" indicates a tie for a place

== Results in senior major championships ==
Tournament	2018	2019	2020	2021	2022	2023	2024
The Tradition		T33	NT	T46	T66		
Senior PGA Championship	T49		NT	CUT	CUT	CUT	
U.S. Senior Open	CUT	T17	NT	T23			CUT
Senior Players Championship	T24	T4	T33	T58	T55		
Senior British Open Championship		CUT	NT		T20		

Top 10
Did not play

CUT = missed the halfway cut
"T" indicates a tie for a place
NT = No tournament due to COVID-19 pandemic

== See also ==
- 1997 PGA Tour Qualifying School graduates
- 1998 PGA Tour Qualifying School graduates
- 2000 Buy.com Tour graduates
- 2001 PGA Tour Qualifying School graduates
- 2007 PGA Tour Qualifying School graduates
- 2008 PGA Tour Qualifying School graduates
- 2010 PGA Tour Qualifying School graduates
