= Windsor Charity Classic =

The Windsor Charity Classic was a golf tournament on the Canadian Tour. It was played from 1979 to 1991 and was revived again for the 2012 season.

== Winners ==
Jamieson WFCU Windsor Roseland Charity Classic

- 2012 (Scotland) Alan McLean

Windsor Charity Classic

- 1992–2011 No tournament
- 1991 (United States) John Erickson
- 1990 (United States) Dave DeLong
- 1989 (Canada) Jerry Anderson
- 1988 (Canada) Matt Cole
- 1987 (Canada) Daniel Talbot
- 1986 (United States) David Tentis
- 1985 (Canada) Sandy Harper
- 1984 (Canada) Ken Tarling
- 1983 No tournament
- 1982 (Canada) Erin Ray Fostey
- 1981 (Canada) Bob Beauchemin
- 1980 (United States) Bob Eastwood
- 1979 (United States) Bob Eastwood
