= Mac O'Grady =

American professional golfer (born 1951)

Personal information
- Full name: Phillip McClelland O'Grady
- Nickname: Mac
- Nationality: United States
- Born: April 26, 1951 (age 75) Minneapolis, Minnesota
- Height: 6 ft 0 in (1.83 m)
- Weight: 185 lb (84 kg; 13.2 st)

Career
- Sport: Golf
- College: Santa Monica Junior College
- Turned professional: 1972
- Former tour: PGA Tour
- Professional wins: 2
- Highest ranking: 36 (February 8, 1987)

Number of wins by tour
- PGA Tour: 2

Best results in major championships
- Masters Tournament: T30: 1988
- PGA Championship: T43: 1987
- U.S. Open: T9: 1987
- The Open Championship: T46: 1986

Phillip McClelland "Mac" O'Grady (born Phillip John McGleno; April 26, 1951) is an American professional golfer and golf teaching professional who played on the PGA Tour in the 1970s and 1980s. He was known for his eccentric behavior and brash statements, in addition to his attending PGA Tour qualifying school 17 times before achieving his card.

== Career ==
In 1951, O'Grady was born in Minneapolis, Minnesota. He attended Santa Monica Junior College in Santa Monica, California, and turned pro in 1972. He attempted to qualify for the PGA Tour through Q School 17 times before finally receiving his tour card. He was finally successful at the 1982 PGA Tour Qualifying School. During this time, he legally changed his name from Phil McGleno to Phillip McClelland O'Grady, and then to Mac O'Grady. O'Grady won two events on the PGA Tour. His first win came at the 1986 Canon Sammy Davis Jr.-Greater Hartford Open; his second and final win came a year later at the MONY Tournament of Champions, a win that lifted him into the world top 50 of the Official World Golf Ranking. His best finish in a major was a T-9 at the 1987 U.S. Open. O'Grady had 18 top-10 finishes as a PGA Tour player. O'Grady left the PGA Tour in 1989 as a result of back problems.

O'Grady, a right-handed player, is ambidextrous; he can also play left-handed at "scratch" level (zero handicap / par). He has previously attempted to gain status as an amateur "lefty" and pro "righty". O'Grady once tried to enter the Chrysler Team Championship as both halves of the same team. He would have played one ball left-handed and the other right-handed.

At the 1984 USF&G Classic, O'Grady got into an altercation with a female tournament volunteer. Eventually O'Grady was fined $500 for it and the fine was taken out of winnings at the 1985 Bob Hope Desert Classic. O'Grady soon afterwards began a series of verbal attacks against Tour Commissioner Deane Beman. At one point, O'Grady said "Deane Beman is a thief with a capital T." He was fined $5,000 and was made to serve a six event suspension late in the 1986 PGA Tour year for conduct unbecoming a professional golfer.

Five years after he left the tour, O'Grady called for a crackdown on beta blockers. O'Grady saying "of the top 30 players worldwide I would be surprised if less than seven stepped to the first tee each week without the use of beta blockers to calm their nerves." Several top European players scoffed at O'Grady's allegations.

The main focus of his career now is teaching the game of golf. Recognized as one of the world's top instructors; he teaches at his Mac O'Grady Golf Schools and lives in Palm Springs, California. His teachings and swing concepts were influenced by Homer Kelley's book The Golfing Machine whom O'Grady had studied with personally in his earlier years. O'Grady's website states, "He was forced to retire in 1990 due to a congenital spine disorder known as spondylolisthesis." However he has been trying and in some cases, succeeding in qualifying for Champions Tour events.

== Professional wins (2) ==
=== PGA Tour wins (2) ===
No.	Date	Tournament	Winning score	Margin of victory	Runner-up
1	Jul 6, 1986	Canon Sammy Davis Jr.-Greater Hartford Open	−15 (71-69-67-62=269)	Playoff	(United States) Roger Maltbie
2	Jan 10, 1987	MONY Tournament of Champions	−10 (65-72-70-71=278)	1 stroke	(United States) Rick Fehr

PGA Tour playoff record (1–0)

No.	Year	Tournament	Opponent	Result
1	1986	Canon Sammy Davis Jr.-Greater Hartford Open	(United States) Roger Maltbie	Won with par on first extra hole

== Results in major championships ==
Tournament	1984	1985	1986	1987	1988	1989
Masters Tournament			CUT	T50	T30	
U.S. Open			T50	T9	CUT	CUT
The Open Championship			T46			
PGA Championship	CUT	CUT	CUT	T43	CUT	

Top 10
Did not play

CUT = missed the half-way cut
"T" = tied

== See also ==
- 1982 PGA Tour Qualifying School graduates
