= Tripp Isenhour =

American golfer

Personal information
- Full name: John Henry Isenhour III
- Nationality: United States
- Born: April 6, 1968 (age 58) Salisbury, North Carolina, U.S.
- Height: 5 ft 11 in (1.80 m)
- Weight: 185 lb (84 kg; 13.2 st)

Career
- Sport: Golf
- College: Georgia Tech
- Turned professional: 1990
- Former tours: PGA Tour; Nationwide Tour
- Professional wins: 6

Number of wins by tour
- Korn Ferry Tour: 4
- Other: 2

Best results in major championships
- Masters Tournament: DNP
- PGA Championship: DNP
- U.S. Open: CUT: 2001, 2004, 2007
- The Open Championship: DNP

John Henry "Tripp" Isenhour III (born April 6, 1968) is an American professional golfer.

== Early life and amateur career ==
In 1968, Isenhour was born in Salisbury, North Carolina. He played college golf at Georgia Tech and turned professional in 1990.

== Professional career ==
Isenhour played on the Nationwide Tour in 1996, 1998, 1999, 2000, 2003, 2005, 2006 and 2008. He was a member of the PGA Tour in 2001, 2002, 2004, 2005 and 2007. He has not played on either tour since 2008.

On December 12, 2007, while being filmed for an educational video, Isenhour killed a red-shouldered hawk by hitting it with a golf ball. According to court documents, Isenhour was irritated by the noises the hawk was making. He hit golf balls at the bird until one struck it in the head. On August 29, 2008, he accepted a plea agreement "to serve one year of probation, donate $1,500 to the Busch Wildlife Sanctuary in Jupiter, Florida, and pay a $500 fine. The former PGA Tour player was also required to undergo 40 hours of community service and attend a four-hour anger-management class."

== Professional wins (6) ==
=== Nationwide Tour wins (4) ===
| No. | Date | Tournament | Winning score | Margin of victory | Runner(s)-up |
|---|---|---|---|---|---|
| 1 | Mar 5, 2000 | Buy.com Mississippi Gulf Coast Open | −9 (70-75-64-70=279) | 2 strokes | (United States) John Elliott |
| 2 | May 4, 2003 | BMW Charity Pro-Am | −18 (64-70-66-69=269) | 2 strokes | (United States) Kyle Thompson |
| 3 | Jan 29, 2006 | Movistar Panama Championship | −11 (63-67-70-69=269) | 3 strokes | (United States) Kevin Gessino-Kraft, (United States) Parker McLachlin, (South Africa) Brenden Pappas |
| 4 | Apr 2, 2006 | Livermore Valley Wine Country Championship | −9 (67-72-72-68=279) | 3 strokes | (Australia) Paul Sheehan |

=== Other wins (2) ===
- 1998 Trinidad Open, Kansas Open

== Results in major championships ==
| Tournament | 2001 | 2002 | 2003 | 2004 | 2005 | 2006 | 2007 |
|---|---|---|---|---|---|---|---|
| U.S. Open | CUT | | | CUT | | | CUT |

Did not play

CUT = missed the half-way cut
Note: Isenhour only played in the U.S. Open.

== See also ==
- 2000 Buy.com Tour graduates
- 2003 Nationwide Tour graduates
- 2006 Nationwide Tour graduates
- List of golfers with most Web.com Tour wins
