= Kelly Gibson =

American professional golfer (born 1964)

Personal information
- Nationality: United States
- Born: May 2, 1964 (age 62) New Orleans, Louisiana, U.S.
- Height: 5 ft 11 in (1.80 m)
- Weight: 190 lb (86 kg; 14 st)

Career
- Sport: Golf
- College: Lamar University
- Turned professional: 1986
- Former tours: PGA Tour; Nike Tour; Canadian Tour
- Professional wins: 4

Number of wins by tour
- Korn Ferry Tour: 2
- Other: 2

Best results in major championships
- Masters Tournament: DNP
- PGA Championship: CUT: 1997
- U.S. Open: T28: 1997
- The Open Championship: DNP

Kelly Gibson (born May 2, 1964) is an American professional golfer. He played on the PGA Tour and the Nationwide Tour.

== Career ==
In 1990, Gibson joined the Ben Hogan Tour. In 1991, he won the Ben Hogan Tri-Cities Open. He also earned his PGA Tour card that year at 1991 PGA Tour Qualifying School.

In his rookie year on the PGA Tour, Gibson finished 105th on the money list while recording three top-10 finishes. He finished 110th on the money list in 1993. In 1994, he recorded two top-10 finishes while finishing 129th on the money list, four spots shy of retaining full-time status on the Tour but he went to qualifying school and earned his card for 1995. He finished 109th on the money list in 1995 while recording one top-10 finish.

In 1996, Gibson recorded his best year on the PGA Tour. He finished 69th on the money list while recording two top-10 finishes. Gibson finished in a tie for third at the Las Vegas Invitational, his best finish on tour in his career. His success continued in 1997 when he finished 92nd on the money list with a top-10 finish and also finished in a tie for 28th at the U.S. Open.

In 1998, Gibson's performance fell off and he finished 139th on the money list. He earned only partial status on the PGA Tour for 1999 and spent most of his time that year on the Nike Tour. He won the Nike Oregon Classic that year and recorded six top-10 finishes en route to a 13th-place finish on the money list, earning him his PGA Tour card for 2000. In his return to the PGA Tour he only made 12 cuts out of 30 events entered so he returned to the developmental tour for 2001. He split time between the tours from 2002 to 2004 and played in a limited number of tournaments after that.

Gibson created the Kelly Gibson Foundation in 2005 to support Hurricane Katrina relief efforts. He also created a Junior Golf Tour in 2009.

== Professional wins (4) ==
=== Nike Tour wins (2) ===
No.	Date	Tournament	Winning score	Margin of victory	Runner-up
1	Oct 20, 1991	Ben Hogan Tri-Cities Open	−11 (73-69-63=205)	2 strokes	(Canada) Jerry Anderson
2	Sep 26, 1999	Nike Oregon Classic	−9 (65-68-71-75=279)	1 stroke	(New Zealand) Craig Perks

=== Canadian Tour wins (2) ===
No.	Date	Tournament	Winning score	Margin of victory	Runner-up
1	Jun 4, 1989	Payless-Pepsi Victoria Open	−12 (65-68-68-67=268)	Playoff	(Canada) Matt Cole
2	Jul 14, 1991	Manitoba Open	−21 (67-71-63-66=267)	4 strokes	(United States) Stuart Hendley

== Results in major championships ==
Tournament	1990	1991	1992	1993	1994	1995	1996	1997	1998	1999	2000	2001	2002
U.S. Open	CUT			CUT			T50	T28					CUT
PGA Championship								CUT					

Did not play

CUT = missed the half-way cut
"T" = tied
Note: Gibson never played in the Masters Tournament or The Open Championship.

== See also ==
- 1991 PGA Tour Qualifying School graduates
- 1994 PGA Tour Qualifying School graduates
- 1999 Nike Tour graduates
