= Matt Gogel =

American professional golfer (born 1971)

Personal information
- Full name: Matthew John Gogel
- Nationality: United States
- Born: February 9, 1971 (age 55) Denver, Colorado, U.S.
- Height: 5 ft 10 in (1.78 m)
- Weight: 175 lb (79 kg; 12.5 st)

Career
- Sport: Golf
- College: University of Kansas
- Turned professional: 1994
- Current tour: PGA Tour Champions
- Former tours: PGA Tour; Nike Tour
- Professional wins: 8
- Highest ranking: 54 (March 3, 2002)

Number of wins by tour
- PGA Tour: 1
- Korn Ferry Tour: 6 (Tied-2nd all-time)
- Other: 1

Best results in major championships
- Masters Tournament: DNP
- PGA Championship: T17: 2004
- U.S. Open: T12: 2001
- The Open Championship: T47: 2001

Matthew John Gogel (born February 9, 1971) is an American professional golfer and golf commentator. He currently plays on the PGA Tour Champions. He previously played on the PGA Tour and the Nike Tour.

== Early life and amateur career ==
In 1971, Gogel was born in Denver, Colorado. He grew up in Tulsa, Oklahoma, where he attended Bishop Kelley High School. He has lived most of his adult life in Kansas. He attended the University of Kansas and was a member of the golf team. He was also a member of Phi Delta Theta fraternity.

== Professional career ==
In 1994, Gogel turned professional. In 2000, he joined the PGA Tour. Gogel played in Asia early in his professional career and on the Nike Tour. He was the first player in the history of the developmental tour to win in four consecutive years.

In 1999, Gogel earned his PGA Tour card for 2000 by finishing 7th on the Nationwide Tour money list. His two best finishes in official PGA Tour events came at the AT&T Pebble Beach National Pro-Am: he won the tournament in 2002 and finished T-2 in 2000. His best finish in a major championship is a T-12 at the 2001 U.S. Open.

After losing his tour card in 2006, Gogel announced an intention to retire after the 2007 AT&T Pebble Beach National Pro-Am.

=== Broadcasting career ===
In June 2007, Gogel joined The Golf Channel as an on-course reporter for its PGA Tour Coverage. His first event was the 2007 Travelers Championship. He joined CBS Sports as a commentator in 2009.

After turning 50, Gogel left broadcasting and joined the PGA Tour Champions. In the 2020–21 season, he finished 63rd in the Charles Schwab Cup Championship.

== Personal life ==
He lives in Mission Hills, Kansas.

== Professional wins (8) ==
=== PGA Tour wins (1) ===
No.	Date	Tournament	Winning score	Margin of victory	Runner-up
1	Feb 3, 2002	AT&T Pebble Beach National Pro-Am	−14 (66-72-67-69=274)	3 strokes	(United States) Pat Perez

=== Nike Tour wins (6) ===
No.	Date	Tournament	Winning score	Margin of victory	Runner(s)-up
1	Sep 22, 1996	Nike Boise Open	−14 (67-65-67-71=270)	1 stroke	(United States) David Berganio Jr., (United States) Brett Quigley
2	Jul 13, 1997	Nike Laurel Creek Classic	−15 (66-68-68-67=269)	1 stroke	(United States) Dennis Paulson
3	Aug 9, 1998	Nike Omaha Classic	−13 (66-69-69-67=271)	Playoff	(United States) Jay Williamson
4	Sep 13, 1998	Nike Tri-Cities Open	−12 (70-73-68-65=276)	Playoff	(United States) Brian Bateman
5	Mar 18, 1999	Nike Louisiana Open	−11 (69-71-68-69=277)	1 stroke	(United States) Kris Cox
6	Jun 13, 1999	Nike Cleveland Open	−15 (68-69-68-68=273)	Playoff	(United States) Casey Martin

Nike Tour playoff record (3–0)

No.	Year	Tournament	Opponent	Result
1	1998	Nike Omaha Classic	(United States) Jay Williamson	Won with par on fourth extra hole
2	1998	Nike Tri-Cities Open	(United States) Brian Bateman	Won with par on third extra hole
3	1999	Nike Cleveland Open	(United States) Casey Martin	Won with eagle on second extra hole

=== Other wins (1) ===
- 1995 Kansas Open

== Results in major championships ==
Tournament	1992	1993	1994	1995	1996	1997	1998	1999	2000	2001	2002	2003	2004
U.S. Open	CUT			T51		CUT			CUT	T12	CUT		CUT
The Open Championship										T47			
PGA Championship											T64		T17

Note: Gogel never played in the Masters Tournament.

Did not play

CUT = missed the half-way cut
"T" = tied

== Results in The Players Championship ==
Tournament	2000	2001	2002	2003	2004	2005
The Players Championship	CUT	CUT	CUT	T66	T53	CUT

CUT = missed the halfway cut
"T" indicates a tie for a place

== Results in World Golf Championships ==
Tournament	2002
Match Play	R16
Championship	
Invitational	T9

Top 10
Did not play

QF, R16, R32, R64 = Round in which player lost in match play
"T" = Tied

== Results in senior major championships ==
Results not in chronological order

Tournament	2021	2022	2023	2024	2025	20267
Senior PGA Championship	T40			WD	T25	T33
The Tradition	T59	63			T16	T15
U.S. Senior Open	CUT	CUT			T36	T26
Senior Players Championship	T49		T51	T33	T48	T14
Senior British Open Championship	T18			T21	T40	T2

Top 10
Did not play

CUT = missed the halfway cut
WD = withdrew
"T" indicates a tie for a place

== See also ==
- 1999 Nike Tour graduates
- List of golfers with most Korn Ferry Tour wins
