= Joel Edwards (golfer) =

American professional golfer (born 1961)

Personal information
- Full name: Joel Ashley Edwards
- Nationality: United States
- Born: November 22, 1961 (age 64) Dallas, Texas, U.S.
- Height: 6 ft 0 in (1.83 m)
- Weight: 190 lb (86 kg; 14 st)

Career
- Sport: Golf
- College: North Texas State University
- Turned professional: 1984
- Current tour: Champions Tour
- Former tour: PGA Tour
- Professional wins: 3
- Highest ranking: 93 (January 20, 2002)

Number of wins by tour
- PGA Tour: 1
- Korn Ferry Tour: 1
- Other: 1

Best results in major championships
- Masters Tournament: DNP
- PGA Championship: T39: 2002
- U.S. Open: T62: 1993
- The Open Championship: DNP

Joel Ashley Edwards (born November 22, 1961) is an American professional golfer.

== Early life ==
Edwards was born in Dallas, Texas. He attended North Texas State University.

== Professional career ==
Edwards turned professional in 1984. He has played on both the PGA Tour and its developmental tour. He has won once on each tour: the 2001 Air Canada Championship on the PGA Tour and the 1999 Nike Mississippi Gulf Coast Open. He lost his PGA Tour card in 2004 and competed on the Nationwide Tour through 2007.

Edwards played occasionally on the Nationwide Tour from 2009 to 2011 before being eligible for the Champions Tour in 2012.

== Professional wins (3) ==
=== PGA Tour wins (1) ===
No.	Date	Tournament	Winning score	Margin of victory	Runner-up
1	Sep 2, 2001	Air Canada Championship	−19 (65-67-68-65=265)	7 strokes	(United States) Steve Lowery

=== Nike Tour wins (1) ===
No.	Date	Tournament	Winning score	Margin of victory	Runner-up
1	Feb 21, 1999	Nike Mississippi Gulf Coast Open	−8 (68-70-73-69=280)	1 stroke	(United States) John Riegger

=== Other wins (1) ===
- 1988 North Dakota Open

== Results in major championships ==
Tournament	1984	1985	1986	1987	1988	1989	1990	1991	1992	1993	1994	1995	1996	1997	1998	1999	2000	2001	2002
U.S. Open	CUT			CUT						T62									
PGA Championship										CUT			77						T39

Note: Edwards never played in the Masters Tournament nor The Open Championship.

Did not play

CUT = missed the half-way cut
"T" = tied

== Results in The Players Championship ==
Tournament	1990	1991	1992	1993	1994	1995	1996	1997	1998	1999	2000	2001	2002	2003
The Players Championship	60			T11	T62	CUT	T19	CUT				DQ	T60	CUT

Did not play

CUT = missed the halfway cut
DQ = disqualified
"T" indicates a tie for a place

== Results in World Golf Championships ==
Tournament	2002
Match Play	
Championship	
Invitational	T47

Did not play

"T" = Tied

== See also ==
- 1988 PGA Tour Qualifying School graduates
- 1989 PGA Tour Qualifying School graduates
- 1990 PGA Tour Qualifying School graduates
- 1995 PGA Tour Qualifying School graduates
- 1999 Nike Tour graduates
