= 1999 Canadian Tour =

Golf tour season

1999 Canadian Tour season
- Duration: May 20, 1999 – September 19, 1999
- Number of official events: 14
- Most wins: (United States) Ken Staton (3)
- Order of Merit: (United States) Ken Duke

The 1999 Canadian Tour was the 14th season of the Canadian Tour, the main professional golf tour in Canada since it was formed in 1986.

== Schedule ==
The following table lists official events during the 1999 season.

Date	Tournament	Location	Purse (C$)	Winner (Note: The number in parentheses after each winner's name is the number of Canadian Tour events they had won up to and including that tournament.)
May 23	Crown Isle Open	British Columbia	150,000	(United States) Ken Staton (1)
May 30	Shell Payless Open	British Columbia	150,000	(United States) Ken Duke (1)
Jun 6	BC TEL Pacific Open	British Columbia	150,000	(United States) Ken Staton (2)
Jun 13	Henry Singer Alberta Open	Alberta	150,000	(United States) Brian Kontak (1)
Jun 27	Telus Calgary Open	Alberta	150,000	(United States) Jaime Gomez (1)
Jul 4	Telus Edmonton Open	Alberta	150,000	(Canada) Ray Stewart (1)
Jul 11	MTS Classic	Manitoba	125,000	(Australia) Neale Smith (1)
Jul 18	Ontario Open Heritage Classic	Ontario	125,000	(United States) Arron Oberholser (1)
Jul 25	Canadian Masters	Ontario	200,000	(Canada) Ray Stewart (2)
Aug 1	Samsung Canadian PGA Championship	Ontario	125,000	(United States) Scott Petersen (2)
Aug 8	Eagle Creek Classic	Ontario	125,000	(United States) Arron Oberholser (2)
Aug 15	AmEx-SAQ Championship	Quebec	100,000	(United States) Ken Staton (3)
Aug 29	McDonald's PEI Challenge	Prince Edward Island	125,000	(Canada) David Morland IV (1)
Sep 19	Bayer Championship	Ontario	200,000	(United States) Ken Duke (2)

== Order of Merit ==
The Order of Merit was titled as the McDonald's Order of Merit and was based on prize money won during the season, calculated in Canadian dollars.

Position	Player	Prize money (C$)
1	(United States) Ken Duke	122,187
2	(Canada) Ray Stewart	83,739
3	(United States) Arron Oberholser	77,412
4	(United States) Ken Staton	64,164
5	(South Africa) Manny Zerman	55,899
