= 1997 Canadian Tour =

Golf tour season

1997 Canadian Tour season
- Duration: May 29, 1997 – August 31, 1997
- Number of official events: 10
- Most wins: (Canada) Mike Weir (2)
- Order of Merit: (Canada) Mike Weir

The 1997 Canadian Tour was the 12th season of the Canadian Tour, the main professional golf tour in Canada since it was formed in 1986.

== Schedule ==
The following table lists official events during the 1997 season.

Date	Tournament	Location	Purse (C$)	Winner (Note: The number in parentheses after each winner's name is the number of Canadian Tour events they had won up to and including that tournament.)
Jun 1	Payless Open	British Columbia	125,000	(Canada) Rick Todd (3)
Jun 8	BC TEL Pacific Open	British Columbia	125,000	(Canada) Mike Weir (2)
Jun 22	Henry Singer Alberta Open	Alberta	150,000	(United States) Ray Freeman (3)
Jun 29	Telus Calgary Open	Alberta	150,000	(South Africa) Ian Hutchings (3)
Jul 6	Telus Edmonton Open	Alberta	150,000	(South Africa) Manny Zerman (1)
Jul 13	Xerox Manitoba Open	Manitoba	125,000	(United States) Mark Wurtz (2)
Jul 20	Infiniti Championship	Ontario	125,000	(United States) Scott Petersen (1)
Jul 27	Canadian Masters	Ontario	250,000	(Canada) Mike Weir (3)
Aug 10	CPGA Championship	Ontario	125,000	(United States) Guy Hill (3)
Aug 31	Montclair PEI Classic	Prince Edward Island	125,000	(United States) Mike Grob (1)

== Order of Merit ==
The Order of Merit was based on prize money won during the season, calculated in Canadian dollars.

Position	Player	Prize money (C$)
1	(Canada) Mike Weir	80,696
2	(United States) Mike Grob	60,257
3	(United States) Ray Freeman	41,921
4	(United States) Scott Petersen	39,956
5	(New Zealand) Steven Alker	37,456
