= 1998 Canadian Tour =

Golf tour season

1998 Canadian Tour season
- Duration: May 28, 1998 – September 20, 1998
- Number of official events: 13
- Most wins: (United States) Brian Kontak (3)
- Order of Merit: (United States) Brian Kontak

The 1998 Canadian Tour was the 13th season of the Canadian Tour, the main professional golf tour in Canada since it was formed in 1986.

== Schedule ==
The following table lists official events during the 1998 season.

Date	Tournament	Location	Purse (C$)	Winner (Note: The number in parentheses after each winner's name is the number of Canadian Tour events they had won up to and including that tournament.)
May 31	Payless Open	British Columbia	125,000	(United States) Jay Hobby (1)
Jun 7	BC TEL Pacific Open	British Columbia	150,000	(South Africa) Ian Hutchings (4)
Jun 14	Telus Calgary Open	Alberta	150,000	(Australia) Scott Wearne (1)
Jun 28	Telus Edmonton Open	Alberta	150,000	(United States) Brian Kontak (1)
Jul 5	Henry Singer Alberta Open	Alberta	150,000	(United States) Brian Kontak (2)
Jul 12	MTS Classic	Manitoba	125,000	(United States) Perry Parker (4)
Jul 19	Infiniti Championship	Ontario	125,000	(United States) Brian Kontak (3)
Jul 26	Canadian Masters	Ontario	200,000	(United States) Mike Grob (2)
Aug 2	Eagle Creek Classic	Ontario	125,000	(United States) Perry Parker (3)
Aug 9	American Express-Shell Cup	Quebec	125,000	(New Zealand) Paul Devenport (1)
Aug 16	New Brunswick Open	New Brunswick	125,000	(South Africa) Tim Clark (1)
Aug 23	CPGA Championship	Ontario	125,000	(South Africa) Tim Clark (2)
Sep 20	Bayer Championship	Ontario	125,000	(United States) Chris Tidland (2)

== Order of Merit ==
The Order of Merit was titled as the McDonald's Order of Merit and was based on prize money won during the season, calculated in Canadian dollars.

Position	Player	Prize money (C$)
1	(United States) Brian Kontak	84,878
2	(New Zealand) Paul Devenport	82,376
3	(United States) Mike Grob	70,903
4	(Canada) Ian Leggatt	60,750
5	(United States) Perry Parker	52,266
