= 1996 Canadian Tour =

Golf tour season

1996 Canadian Tour season
- Duration: May 30, 1996 – September 15, 1996
- Number of official events: 12
- Most wins: (Namibia) Trevor Dodds (4)
- Order of Merit: (Namibia) Trevor Dodds

The 1996 Canadian Tour was the 11th season of the Canadian Tour, the main professional golf tour in Canada since it was formed in 1986.

== Schedule ==
The following table lists official events during the 1996 season.

| Date | Tournament | Location | Purse (C$) | Winner (Note: The number in parentheses after each winner's name is the number of Canadian Tour events they had won up to and including that tournament.) |
|---|---|---|---|---|
| Jun 2 | Payless Open | British Columbia | 100,000 | (Canada) Arden Knoll (1) |
| Jun 9 | BC TEL Pacific Open | British Columbia | 125,000 | (United States) Guy Hill (2) |
| Jun 16 | Morningstar Classic | British Columbia | 100,000 | (Canada) Bryan DeCorso (1) |
| Jun 23 | Henry Singer Alberta Open | Alberta | 125,000 | (Namibia) Trevor Dodds (3) |
| Jun 30 | ED TEL PLAnet Open | Alberta | 125,000 | (Namibia) Trevor Dodds (4) |
| Jul 14 | Xerox Manitoba Open | Manitoba | 100,000 | (Canada) Rob McMillan (a) (1) |
| Jul 21 | Infiniti Championship | Ontario | 125,000 | (Namibia) Trevor Dodds (5) |
| Jul 28 | Canadian Masters | Ontario | 250,000 | (Namibia) Trevor Dodds (6) |
| Aug 11 | Export "A" Inc. Ontario Open | Ontario | 125,000 | (Canada) Martin Price (1) |
| Aug 18 | Montclair Quebec Open | Quebec | 125,000 | (United States) Chris DiMarco (1) |
| Sep 1 | Montclair PEI Classic | Prince Edward Island | 125,000 | (Canada) Frank Edmonds (5) |
| Sep 15 | CPGA Championship | Ontario | 100,000 | (Canada) Ashley Chinner (1) |

== Order of Merit ==
The Order of Merit was based on prize money won during the season, calculated in Canadian dollars.

| Position | Player | Prize money (C$) |
|---|---|---|
| 1 | (Namibia) Trevor Dodds | 129,158 |
| 2 | (Canada) Arden Knoll | 78,534 |
| 3 | (United States) Mike Grob | 45,727 |
| 4 | (United States) Guy Hill | 44,609 |
| 5 | (United States) Chris DiMarco | 44,130 |
