= 1995 Canadian Tour =

Golf tour season

1995 Canadian Tour season
- Duration: June 1, 1995 – August 27, 1995
- Number of official events: 11
- Most wins: (Namibia) Trevor Dodds (2) (United States) Ray Freeman (2)
- Order of Merit: (Namibia) Trevor Dodds

The 1995 Canadian Tour was the 10th season of the Canadian Tour, the main professional golf tour in Canada since it was formed in 1986.

== Schedule ==
The following table lists official events during the 1995 season.

Date	Tournament	Location	Purse (C$)	Winner (Note: The number in parentheses after each winner's name is the number of Canadian Tour events they had won up to and including that tournament.)
Jun 4	Payless Open	British Columbia	100,000	(Canada) Norm Jarvis (1)
Jun 11	BC TEL Pacific Open	British Columbia	125,000	(United States) Nicky Goetze (1)
Jun 18	Morningstar Classic	British Columbia	100,000	(United States) Jeff Bloom (2)
Jun 25	Henry Singer Alberta Open	Alberta	100,000	(South Africa) Ian Hutchings (2)
Jul 2	Klondike Klassic	Alberta	100,000	(United States) Ray Freeman (1)
Jul 9	Xerox Manitoba Open	Manitoba	100,000	(Namibia) Trevor Dodds (1)
Jul 23	Infiniti Championship	Ontario	125,000	(United States) Guy Hill (1)
Aug 6	Canadian Masters	Ontario	200,000	(United States) Scott Dunlap (2)
Aug 13	Export "A" Inc. Ontario Open	Ontario	100,000	(United States) Ray Freeman (2)
Aug 20	CPGA Championship	Ontario	125,000	(Namibia) Trevor Dodds (2)
Aug 27	Montclair Kings County Classic	Prince Edward Island	125,000	(Canada) Jim Rutledge (3)

== Order of Merit ==
The Order of Merit was based on prize money won during the season, calculated in Canadian dollars.

Position	Player	Prize money (C$)
1	(Namibia) Trevor Dodds	78,468
2	(United States) Scott Dunlap	65,249
3	(United States) Ray Freeman	54,293
4	(South Africa) Ian Hutchings	51,835
5	(Canada) Jim Rutledge	44,631
