= 1994 Canadian Tour =

Golf tour season

1994 Canadian Tour season
- Duration: June 2, 1994 – August 21, 1994
- Number of official events: 10
- Order of Merit: (United States) Eric Woods

The 1994 Canadian Tour was the ninth season of the Canadian Tour, the main professional golf tour in Canada since it was formed in 1986.

== Schedule ==
The following table lists official events during the 1994 season.

Date	Tournament	Location	Purse (C$)	Winner (Note: The number in parentheses after each winner's name is the number of Canadian Tour events they had won up to and including that tournament.)	OWGR points
Jun 5	Payless Open	British Columbia	100,000	(United States) Matt Jackson (1)	n/a
Jun 12	Morningstar Classic	British Columbia	100,000	(United States) Robert Meyer (2)	n/a
Jun 19	BC TEL Pacific Open	British Columbia	100,000	(Australia) Craig Jones (1)	n/a
Jun 26	Alberta Open	Alberta	100,000	(Canada) Jim Rutledge (2)	n/a
Jul 3	Klondike Klassic	Alberta	100,000	(South Africa) Ian Hutchings (1)	n/a
Jul 10	Xerox Manitoba Open	Manitoba	100,000	(United States) Scott Dunlap (1)	n/a
Jul 24	Infiniti Championship	Ontario	100,000	(South Africa) Derek James (1)	n/a
Jul 31	Canadian Masters	Ontario	100,000	(South Africa) Roger Wessels (1)	n/a
Aug 14	Export "A" Inc. Ontario Open	Ontario	100,000	(United States) Eric Woods (3)	n/a
Aug 21	CPGA Championship	Quebec	100,000	(United States) Stuart Hendley (3)	4

== Order of Merit ==
The Order of Merit was based on prize money won during the season, calculated in Canadian dollars.

Position	Player	Prize money (C$)
1	(United States) Eric Woods	44,083
2	(South Africa) Roger Wessels	41,387
3	(Canada) Jim Rutledge	40,845
4	(South Africa) Ian Hutchings	40,530
5	(United States) Scott Dunlap	38,945
