= 1987 Canadian Tour =

Golf tour season

1987 Canadian Tour season
- Duration: June 15, 1987 – September 13, 1987
- Number of official events: 8
- Order of Merit: (United States) Jim Benepe

The 1987 Canadian Tour was the second season of the Canadian Tour, the main professional golf tour in Canada since it was formed in 1986.

== Schedule ==
The following table lists official events during the 1987 season.

Date	Tournament	Location	Purse (C$)	Winner (Note: The number in parentheses after each winner's name is the number of Canadian Tour events they had won up to and including that tournament.)	OWGR points
Jun 17	Labbatt's Blue Light Pro-Am	Ontario	50,000	(Canada) Gordon Smith (2)	n/a
Jun 28	Quebec Open	Quebec	60,000	(United States) Todd Erwin (1)	n/a
Jul 12	Windsor Charity Classic	Ontario	60,000	(Canada) Daniel Talbot (1)	n/a
Aug 2	Manitoba Open	Manitoba	75,000	(Canada) Dave Barr (2)	n/a
Aug 14	Alberta Open	Alberta	25,000	(Australia) Ian Roberts (1)	n/a
Aug 30	George Williams B.C. Open	British Columbia	130,000	(United States) Jim Benepe (1)	n/a
Sep 6	Payless Canadian Tournament Players Championship	British Columbia	50,000	(Australia) Craig Parry (1)	n/a
Sep 13	CPGA Championship	Ontario	125,000	(Canada) Jerry Anderson (2)	4

== Order of Merit ==
The Order of Merit was titled as the Labbatt Order of Merit and was based on prize money won during the season, calculated in Canadian dollars.

Position	Player	Prize money (C$)
1	(United States) Jim Benepe	37,832
2	(Canada) Jerry Anderson	31,692
3	(Canada) Jim Rutledge	30,952
4	(Canada) Dave Barr	26,280
5	(United States) David Tentis	23,741
