= 1993 Canadian Tour =

Golf tour season

1993 Canadian Tour season
- Duration: June 3, 1993 – September 5, 1993
- Number of official events: 9
- Most wins: (United States) Eric Woods (2)
- Order of Merit: (United States) Eric Woods

The 1993 Canadian Tour was the eighth season of the Canadian Tour, the main professional golf tour in Canada since it was formed in 1986.

== Schedule ==
The following table lists official events during the 1993 season.

Date	Tournament	Location	Purse (C$)	Winner (Note: The number in parentheses after each winner's name is the number of Canadian Tour events they had won up to and including that tournament.)	OWGR points
Jun 6	Payless Open	British Columbia	125,000	(United States) Brandt Jobe (2)	n/a
Jun 13	Xerox British Columbia Open	British Columbia	100,000	(United States) Eric Woods (1)	n/a
Jun 20	Allianz Alberta Open	Alberta	100,000	(Australia) Don Fardon (2)	n/a
Jul 4	Klondike Klassic	Alberta	125,000	(Australia) Tod Power (1)	n/a
Jul 11	Xerox Manitoba Open	Manitoba	100,000	(Canada) Frank Edmonds (4)	n/a
Jul 25	Infiniti Tournament Players Championship	Ontario	100,000	(Canada) Mike Weir (1)	n/a
Aug 1	Export "A" Inc. Ontario Open	Ontario	100,000	(United States) Eric Woods (2)	n/a
Aug 29	CPGA Championship	Ontario	100,000	(United States) Steve Stricker (2)	4
Sep 5	PEI Classic	Prince Edward Island	100,000	(Paraguay) Ángel Franco (1)	n/a

== Order of Merit ==
The Order of Merit was based on prize money won during the season, calculated in Canadian dollars.

Position	Player	Prize money (C$)
1	(United States) Eric Woods	44,325
2	(United States) Brandt Jobe	40,520
3	(Canada) Philip Jonas	25,908
4	(United States) Steve Stricker	24,605
5	(Australia) Tod Power	22,500
