= Ian Hutchings =

Personal information
- Full name: Ian Guy Hutchings
- Nationality: Zimbabwe; South Africa
- Born: 26 March 1968 (age 58) Harare, Zimbabwe
- Height: 1.8 m (5 ft 11 in)
- Weight: 80 kg (180 lb; 13 st)

Career
- Sport: Golf
- Turned professional: 1988
- Current tour: Sunshine Tour
- Former tour: Canadian Tour
- Professional wins: 8

Number of wins by tour
- Sunshine Tour: 1
- Other: 7

Ian Guy Hutchings (born 26 March 1968) is a professional golfer from Zimbabwe who lives in South Africa.

== Career ==
Hutchings is currently a member of the Sunshine Tour and a former member of the Canadian Tour. He collected two wins in South Africa in 1994 and 1996, four wins in Canada, and other international victories. His best ever finish on the Sunshine Tour Order of Merit was 14th in 1994. He has over R1,500,000 career earnings on the Sunshine Tour.

== Amateur highlights ==
- 12 Amateur wins
- 1987/1988 Springbok

== Professional wins (8) ==
=== Sunshine Tour wins (1) ===
No.	Date	Tournament	Winning score	Margin of victory	Runner-up
1	18 May 1996	FNB Pro Series (Eastern Cape)	−16 (66-69-68=203)	1 stroke	(South Africa) Mark Murless

=== Canadian Tour wins (4) ===
No.	Date	Tournament	Winning score	Margin of victory	Runner(s)-up
1	3 Jul 1994	Klondike Klassic	−5 (70-71-66-68=275)	Playoff	(Canada) Arden Knoll
2	25 Jun 1995	Henry Singer Alberta Open	−12 (67-63-66-72=268)	3 strokes	(Namibia) Trevor Dodds
3	29 Jun 1997	Telus Calgary Open	−17 (71-66-67-67=271)	2 strokes	(United States) Scott Petersen, (United States) Jean-Paul Hebert
4	7 Jun 1998	BC TEL Pacific Open	−13 (66-69-68-68=271)	2 strokes	(United States) John Bizik, (Mexico) Carlos Espinosa, (United States) Steve Woods

=== Other wins (3) ===
- 1992 Bidvest Sun-City Pro-Am (South Africa non-Order of Merit event)
- 1994 Iscor Newcastle Classic
- 1995 Los Leones Open (Chile)
