= Telus Open (disambiguation) =

Telus Open may refer a number of different golf tournaments in Canada that were sponsored by Telus Communications in the 1990s and 2000s:

- Telus Calgary Open, held in Calgary, Alberta
- Telus Edmonton Open, held in Edmonton, Alberta
- Telus Open, held in Greater Montreal, Quebec
- Telus Vancouver Open, held in Vancouver, British Columbia
