= 1992 Canadian Tour =

Golf tour season

1992 Canadian Tour season
- Duration: May 28, 1992 – September 6, 1992
- Number of official events: 12 (Note: A further two tournaments were scheduled but were either cancelled otherwise removed from the schedule.)
- Most wins: (United States) Perry Parker (2) (United States) Mike Tschetter (2)
- Order of Merit: (United States) Chris DiMarco

The 1992 Canadian Tour was the seventh season of the Canadian Tour, the main professional golf tour in Canada since it was formed in 1986.

== Schedule ==
The following table lists official events during the 1992 season.

Date	Tournament	Location	Purse (C$)	Winner (Note: The number in parentheses after each winner's name is the number of Canadian Tour events they had won up to and including that tournament.)	OWGR points
May 31	Payless Open	British Columbia	100,000	(United States) Mike Colandro (1)	n/a
Jun 7	Xerox British Columbia Open	British Columbia	100,000	(United States) Perry Parker (2)	n/a
Jun 14	Canadian Home Assurance Alberta Open	Alberta	100,000	(Australia) Richard Backwell (1)	n/a
Jun 21	Paradise Canyon Classic	Alberta	125,000	(United States) Mike Tschetter (1)	n/a
Jun 28	Willows Classic	Saskatchewan	100,000	(United States) Lee Chill (1)	n/a
Jul 5	CPGA Championship	Saskatchewan	150,000	(United States) Kip Byrne (1)	4
Jul 12	Xerox Manitoba Open	Manitoba	100,000	(United States) Chris Patton (1)	n/a
~~Jul 26~~	Windsor Charity Classic	Ontario	–	Cancelled	–
Jul 26	Infiniti Tournament Players Championship	Ontario	150,000	(United States) Stuart Hendley (2)	n/a
Aug 9	Trafalgar Capital Classic	Ontario	100,000	(New Zealand) Grant Waite (1)	n/a
~~Aug 16~~	Quebec Open	Quebec	–	Removed	–
Aug 23	Ontario Open	Ontario	100,000	(Australia) Don Fardon (1)	n/a
Aug 30	Atlantic Classic	New Brunswick	100,000	(United States) Mike Tschetter (2)	n/a
Sep 6	PEI Kings County Classic	Prince Edward Island	100,000	(United States) Perry Parker (3)	n/a

== Order of Merit ==
The Order of Merit was based on prize money won during the season, calculated in Canadian dollars.

Position	Player	Prize money (C$)
1	(United States) Chris DiMarco	57,148
2	(United States) Mike Tschetter	54,459
3	(United States) Perry Parker	46,862
4	(United States) Stuart Hendley	41,413
5	(New Zealand) Grant Waite	41,187
