= 1990 Canadian Tour =

Golf tour season

1990 Canadian Tour season
- Duration: May 31, 1990 – September 26, 1990
- Number of official events: 9
- Order of Merit: (United States) Brandt Jobe

The 1990 Canadian Tour was the fifth season of the Canadian Tour, the main professional golf tour in Canada since it was formed in 1986.

== Schedule ==
The following table lists official events during the 1990 season.

Date	Tournament	Location	Purse (C$)	Winner (Note: The number in parentheses after each winner's name is the number of Canadian Tour events they had won up to and including that tournament.)	OWGR points
Jun 3	Payless-Pepsi Victoria Open	British Columbia	85,000	(United States) Steve Stricker (1)	n/a
Jun 10	Canadian Airlines-George Williams B.C. Open	British Columbia	160,000	(United States) Brandt Jobe (1)	n/a
Jun 24	Alberta Open	Alberta	75,000	(Canada) Bruce Bulina (1)	n/a
Jul 15	Windsor Charity Classic	Alberta	75,000	(United States) Dave DeLong (2)	n/a
Jul 22	Manitoba Open	Manitoba	100,000	(United States) Jeff Bloom (1)	n/a
Aug 19	Quebec Open	Quebec	90,000	(United States) Michael Bradley (2)	n/a
Aug 26	Canadian Tournament Players Championship	Ontario	100,000	(United States) Ernie Gonzalez (1)	n/a
Sep 2	Atlantic Classic	Prince Edward Island	100,000	(Canada) Frank Edmonds (3)	n/a
Sep 23	CPGA Championship	British Columbia	150,000	(Canada) Rick Gibson (2)	4

=== Unofficial events ===
The following events were sanctioned by the Canadian Tour, but did not carry official money, nor were wins official.

Date	Tournament	Location	Purse (C$)	Winner
Jul 1	Fort McMurray Rotary Charity Classic	Alberta	50,000	(United States) Louis Brown

== Order of Merit ==
The Order of Merit was titled as the du Maurier Order of Merit and was based on prize money won during the season, calculated in Canadian dollars.

Position	Player	Prize money (C$)
1	(United States) Brandt Jobe	40,844
2	(United States) Ernie Gonzalez	34,341
3	(Canada) Rick Gibson	34,096
4	(United States) Louis Brown	30,818
5	(United States) Jeff Bloom	25,388
