= 1988 Canadian Tour =

Golf tour season

1988 Canadian Tour season
- Duration: June 10, 1988 – September 10, 1988
- Number of official events: 11 (Note: One further tournament was scheduled but was cancelled.)
- Most wins: (Canada) Dave Barr (2) (United States) Kirk Triplett (2)
- Order of Merit: (Canada) Dave Barr

The 1988 Canadian Tour was the third season of the Canadian Tour, the main professional golf tour in Canada since it was formed in 1986.

== Schedule ==
The following table lists official events during the 1988 season.

Date	Tournament	Location	Purse (C$)	Winner (Note: The number in parentheses after each winner's name is the number of Canadian Tour events they had won up to and including that tournament.)	OWGR points
Jun 12	Canadian Airlines-George Williams B.C. Open	British Columbia	150,000	(United States) Dave DeLong (1)	n/a
Jun 19	Victoria Open	British Columbia	75,000	(United States) Todd Erwin (2)	n/a
Jun 26	Alberta Open	Alberta	50,000	(United States) Kirk Triplett (1)	n/a
Jul 1	Fort McMurray Rotary Charity Classic	Alberta	50,000	(United States) Kirk Triplett (2)	n/a
Jul 10	Manitoba Open	Manitoba	75,000	(Canada) Dave Barr (3)	n/a
Jul 17	Windsor Charity Classic	Ontario	60,000	(Canada) Matt Cole (1)	n/a
~~Jul 24~~	Saskatchewan Open	Saskatchewan	–	Cancelled	–
Jul 31	CPGA Championship	Ontario	125,000	(Canada) Brent Franklin (1)	4
Aug 7	Canadian Tournament Players Championship	Ontario	100,000	(Canada) Dave Barr (4)	n/a
Aug 21	Atlantic Classic	Prince Edward Island	60,000	(Australia) Anthony Gilligan (1)	n/a
Aug 28	Quebec Open	Quebec	70,000	(United States) Gene Elliott (1)	n/a
Sep 10	Labatt's Blue Light Pro-Am	Quebec	50,000	(Canada) Rick Gibson (1)	n/a

== Order of Merit ==
The Order of Merit was titled as the Labbatt Order of Merit and was based on prize money won during the season, calculated in Canadian dollars.

Position	Player	Prize money (C$)
1	(Canada) Dave Barr	94,750
2	(Canada) Gordon Smith	45,930
3	(United States) Dave DeLong	37,437
4	(Canada) Rick Gibson	32,622
5	(Canada) Brent Franklin	32,517
