= Canadian PGA Championship =

PGA Championship of Canada
Tournament information
- Location: Baysville, Ontario, Canada
- Established: 1912
- Course: Bigwin Island Golf Club
- Par: 72
- Length: 6,984 yards (6,386 m)
- Tours: Nationwide Tour; Canadian Tour
- Format: Match play Stroke play
- Prize fund: CA$70,000
- Month played: June

Tournament record score
- Aggregate: 263 Riley Fleming (2021)
- To par: −25 as above
- Score: 5 and 4 Danny King (2015)

Current champion
- (Canada) Craig Stefureak

Location map
- Location in Canada Location in Ontario

The PGA Championship of Canada is a golf tournament organized by the PGA of Canada, an organization founded in 1911 at the Royal Ottawa Golf Club. It was first played in 1912 as the Canadian PGA Championship. It was a Nationwide Tour event from 2001 to 2005. Prior to that it was an event on the Canadian Tour. Stan Leonard holds the record with eight victories.

Between 1978 and 1983, the tournament was sponsored by Labatt and titled as the Labatt's International Golf Classic with a prize fund of C$100,000. It attracted many of the leading PGA Tour players of the day, with multiple major champions Arnold Palmer, Lee Trevino (twice), Raymond Floyd and Lanny Wadkins lifting the trophy during those six years.

In 2011, the PGA Championship of Canada was reintroduced as a match play championship for the top 64 competitors on the PGA of Canada Player Rankings. The P.D. Ross Trophy was given to the winner in 1912, and is still used as the Championship's award today.

== Winners ==
Year	Tour (Note: BUY/NWT − Buy.com Tour/Nationwide Tour; CAN − Canadian Tour.)	Winner	Score	To par	Margin of victory	Runner(s)-up	Venue	Ref.
PGA Championship of Canada
2026		(Canada) Craig Stefureak (2)	194	−22	7 strokes	(Canada) Dillon Bastel (Canada) Luke Bogdan	St. Eugene Golf Resort	
2025		(Canada) Craig Stefureak	201	−15	3 strokes	(Canada) Dillon Bastel	Pinegrove	
2024		(Canada) Yohann Benson	215	−1	Playoff	(Canada) Mitchell Fox	Mickelson National	
BetRegal PGA Championship of Canada
2023		(Canada) Kevin Stinson	133 (Note: Shortened to 36 holes due to rain.)	−11	Playoff	(Canada) David Li Sheman	Bigwin Island	
2022		(Canada) Wes Heffernan	278	−10	5 strokes	(Canada) Jim Rutledge	Beacon Hall	
PGA Championship of Canada
2021		(Canada) Riley Fleming	263	−25	3 strokes	(Canada) Kevin Stinson	Parcours de Vieux Village	
2020		Cancelled due to the COVID-19 pandemic						
2019		(Canada) Dustin Risdon	3 and 1			(Canada) Oliver Tubb	Whistle Bear	
2018		(Canada) Pierre-Alexandre Bedard	1 up			(Canada) Gordon Burns	Credit Valley	
2017		(Canada) Jean-Philip Cornellier	2 up			(Canada) Bryn Parry	Deer Ridge	
2016		(Canada) Marc-Etienne Bussieres	3 and 1			(Canada) Billy Walsh	Victoria	
2015		(Canada) Danny King	5 and 4			(Canada) Oliver Tubb	Cabot Links	
2014		(Canada) Dave Levesque	2 up			(Canada) Billy Walsh	Wyndance	
2013		(Canada) Bryn Parry	2 and 1			(Canada) Billy Walsh	Magna	
2012		(Canada) Eric Laporte	3 and 1			(Canada) Lindsay Bernakevitch	Country Hills	
2011		(Canada) Vincent Dumouchel	19 holes			(Canada) Brian McCann	Cottonwood	
Canadian PGA Championship
2006–2010: No tournament
2005	NWT	(Canada) Jon Mills	269	−19	3 strokes	(United States) Ken Duke	Whistle Bear	
Samsung Canadian PGA Championship
2004	NWT	(United States) Charles Warren	269	−19	7 strokes	(United States) Doug Barron	Whistle Bear	
2003	NWT	(United States) Tom Carter	275	−9	Playoff	(United States) Jason Bohn	DiamondBack	
2002	BUY	(United States) Arron Oberholser	268	−16	2 strokes	(United States) Doug Barron	DiamondBack	
2001	BUY	(Canada) Richard Zokol	271	−17	3 strokes	(United States) Gary Hallberg	DiamondBack	
2000	CAN	(United States) Chad Wright	268	−16	1 stroke	(United States) Chris Anderson (United States) Jason Bohn	King's Riding	
1999	CAN	(United States) Scott Petersen	203 (Note: Shortened to 54 holes due to weather.)	−13	2 strokes	(United States) Jeff Bloom (United States) Derek Gilchrist	DiamondBack	
CPGA Championship
1998	CAN	(South Africa) Tim Clark	272	−16	Playoff	(United States) Chris Tidland	Forest City National	
1997	CAN	(United States) Guy Hill	276	−8	Playoff	(Canada) Mike Weir	The Mandarin	
1996	CAN	(Canada) Ashley Chinner	205	−8	1 stroke	(Canada) Todd Fanning	The Mandarin	
1995	CAN	(Namibia) Trevor Dodds	276	−12	1 stroke	(United States) J. J. West	Rideau View	
1994	CAN	(United States) Stuart Hendley	275	−13	1 stroke	(United States) Scott Ford	Le Royal Bromont	
1993	CAN	(United States) Steve Stricker	274	−10	5 strokes	(United States) John Restino	Credit Valley	
1992	CAN	(United States) Kip Byrne	266	−18	3 strokes	(United States) Louis Brown (Canada) Mike Pero	Wascana	
1991	CAN	(United States) Tom Harding	273	−15	3 strokes	(United States) Guy Boros (New Zealand) Grant Waite	Sorel-Tracy	
1990	CAN	(Canada) Rick Gibson	272	−16	1 stroke	(United States) Louis Brown (Canada) Richard Zokol	Quilchena	
1989	CAN	(Canada) Jean-Louis Lamarre	275	−13	2 strokes	(United States) Stuart Hendley	Glencoe	
1988	CAN	(Canada) Brent Franklin	283	−5	1 stroke	(Canada) Dave Barr	Emerald Hills	
1987	CAN	(Canada) Jerry Anderson	271	−13	Playoff	(United States) Kirk Triplett	Scarboro	
1986	CAN	(Canada) Dan Halldorson	277	−11	1 stroke	(Canada) Dave Barr	Brantford	
1985		(Canada) Dave Barr	282	−6	1 stroke	(Canada) Jerry Anderson	Brampton	
1984		(Canada) Jim Rutledge	272	−16	6 strokes	(Canada) Ray Stewart	Spring Lakes	
Labatt's International
1983		(United States) Lee Trevino (2)	271	−17	3 strokes	(Japan) Tsuneyuki Nakajima	Royal Quebec	
1982		(United States) Jim Thorpe	283	−1	1 stroke	(Canada) Dave Barr	Cherry Hill	
Labatt's International Golf Classic
1981		(United States) Raymond Floyd	277	−11	6 strokes	(Canada) Daniel Talbot	Westmount	
1980		(United States) Arnold Palmer	271	−9	1 stroke	(Japan) Isao Aoki	Mayfair	
1979		(United States) Lee Trevino	285	+1	3 strokes	(United States) Lanny Wadkins	The National	
1978		(United States) Lanny Wadkins	270	−18	12 strokes	(South Africa) Dale Hayes (New Zealand) Simon Owen	Shaughnessy	
Canadian PGA Championship
1977		(Canada) George Knudson (5)	276	−12			Hylands	
1976		(Canada) George Knudson (4)	275	−13			St. Charles	
1975		(Canada) Bill Tape	275	−9			Bayview	
1974		(Canada) Moe Norman (2)	271	−13			Willow Park	
1973		(Canada) Bob Panasik (2)	272				Burlington	
1972		(Canada) Bob Panasik	279				Rivermead	
1971		(Canada) Wilf Homenuik (2)	273				Saskatoon	
1970		(Canada) Al Balding (4)	282				Brantford	
1969		(Canada) Bobby Cox	280	−8			Point Grey	
1968		(Canada) George Knudson (3)	268	−20			Royal Quebec	
1967		(Canada) George Knudson (2)	134	−10			St. Catharines	
1966		(Canada) Moe Norman	204				Willow Park	
1965		(Canada) Wilf Homenuik	215				Royal Montreal	
1964		(Canada) George Knudson	199				Ashburn	
1963		(Canada) Al Balding (3)	202				Mayfair	
1962		(Canada) Alvie Thompson	277				Mississauga	
1961		(Canada) Stan Leonard (8)	203				Royal Quebec	
1960		(Canada) Bill Kerr (2)	206				Niakwa	
1959		(Canada) Stan Leonard (7)	204				Rivermead	
1958		(Canada) Henry Martell (2)	209				Calgary	
1957		(Canada) Stan Leonard (6)	210				Kawartha	
1956		(Canada) Al Balding (2)	136				Downsview	
1955		(Canada) Al Balding	204				Hamilton	
1954		(Canada) Stan Leonard (5)	206				Mayfair	
1953		(Canada) Henry Martell	211				Royal Quebec	
1952		(Canada) Pat Fletcher	210				Niakwa	
1951		(Canada) Stan Leonard (4)	206				Hamilton	
1950		(Canada) Stan Leonard (3)	212				Summerlea	
1949		Dick Borthwick	286				Seigniory Club	
1948		(Canada) Gordie Brydson (2)					Point Grey	
1947		(Canada) Rodolphe Huot					Riverside	
1946		(Canada) Jules Huot (3)					Niakwa	
1945		(Canada) Bill Kerr					Laval-sur-le-lac	
1944		(Canada) Gordie Brydson					Seigniory Club	
1943: No tournament due to World War II
1942		Bob Burns					Chaudiere	
1941		(Canada) Stan Leonard (2)	291				Islesmere	
1940		(Canada) Stan Leonard	280				Cedar Brae	
1939		(Canada) Jules Huot (2)	279				Kent	
1938		Stanley Horne (3)	284				Cataraqui	
1937		Stanley Horne (2)	288				Ottawa Hunt	
1936		Stanley Horne	294				Cataraqui	
1935		(Scotland) Willie Lamb (5)	288				Elm Ridge	
1934		(Canada) Jules Huot	279				Montreal	
1933		(Scotland) Willie Lamb (4)	146				Toronto	
1932		(Scotland) Lex Robson	143				Rivermead	
1931		Andy Kay	138				Rosedale	
1930		(Scotland) Willie Lamb (3)					Burlington	
1929		(Scotland) Willie Lamb (2)					Laval-sur-le-lac	
1928		(Scotland) Willie Lamb					Rosedale	
1927		Jimmie Johnstone (2)					Lambton	
1926		Jimmie Johnstone					Summerlea	
1925		(England) Percy Barrett (2)					Toronto	
1924		(England) Albert Murray					Beaconsfield	
1923		(England) Percy Barrett					Summit	
1922		Nicol Thompson					Montreal	
1921		(Scotland) Davie Black (4)					Lambton	
1920		(Scotland) Davie Black (3)					Royal Ottawa	
1919		(Scotland) Davie Black (2)					Scarboro	
1915–1918: No tournament due to World War I
1914		(Scotland) George Cumming					Lakeview	
1913		(Scotland) Davie Black					Beaconsfield	
1912		(England) Charlie Murray	156				Mississaugua	
