= Scott Dunlap =

American professional golfer (born 1963)

Personal information
- Full name: Scott Michael Dunlap
- Nationality: United States
- Born: August 16, 1963 (age 63) Pittsburgh, Pennsylvania, U.S.
- Height: 5 ft 11 in (1.80 m)
- Weight: 185 lb (84 kg; 13.2 st)

Career
- Sport: Golf
- College: University of Florida
- Turned professional: 1985
- Current tour: PGA Tour Champions
- Former tours: PGA Tour; Web.com Tour; Sunshine Tour; Canadian Tour
- Professional wins: 13
- Highest ranking: 58 (August 20, 2000)

Number of wins by tour
- Sunshine Tour: 2
- Korn Ferry Tour: 2
- PGA Tour Champions: 2
- Other: 7

Best results in major championships
- Masters Tournament: DNP
- PGA Championship: T9: 2000
- U.S. Open: T24: 1997
- The Open Championship: T10: 1999

Achievements and awards
- Champions Tour Rookie of the Year: 2014

Scott Michael Dunlap (born August 16, 1963) is an American professional golfer who currently plays on the PGA Tour Champions, having previously been a member of the PGA Tour.

== Early life ==
Born in Pittsburgh, Pennsylvania, Dunlap grew up in Sarasota, Florida. The valedictorian of the class of 1981 at Sarasota High School.

== Amateur career ==
Dunlap accepted an athletic scholarship to attend the University of Florida in Gainesville where he played for the Florida Gators men's golf team in NCAA competition from 1982 to 1985. During his 1985 senior season, the Gators won the Southeastern Conference (SEC) team championship, and Dunlap was recognized as a first-team All-SEC selection, an All-American, and the Golf Week Male Amateur of the Year.

While at Florida, he became a member of Delta Tau Delta fraternity. Dunlap graduated from Florida with a bachelor's degree in finance in 1986.

== Professional career ==
Dunlap played on the PGA Tour's developmental tour in 1990, 1998, and from 2003 to 2013, and has two victories. He played on the PGA Tour in 1996–97, 1999–2002, and 2012. His best finishes on PGA Tour were a trio of tied for third places: 1996 Bell Canadian Open, 1999 Doral-Ryder Open, and 2000 The Players Championship and his best finish on the year-end money list was 44th in 2000. He had top ten finishes in major championships at the Open Championship in 1999 at Carnoustie and the PGA Championship in 2000 at Valhalla.

=== Champions Tour ===
Dunlap turned 50 in August 2013 and began playing the Champions Tour full-time in 2014; he won his first title at the Boeing Classic near Seattle that August, defeating Mark Brooks on the first hole of a sudden-death playoff. At the par-5 18th, Dunlap's second shot stopped four feet (1.3 m) from the pin. Brooks' birdie attempt missed from 30 feet (9 m) and Dunlap two-putted for the win. The winner's share was $300,000 and along with the trophy, he received a leather flight jacket.

== Personal life ==
He has a sister, Page Dunlap, who is also a professional golfer. She won the individual 1986 NCAA Women's Golf Championship while playing for the Florida Gators women's golf team.

== Amateur wins ==
this list may be incomplete

- 1984 Southern Amateur

== Professional wins (13) ==
=== Southern Africa Tour wins (2) ===
No.	Date	Tournament	Winning score	To par	Margin of victory	Runner-up
1	Feb 5, 1995	Telkom South African Masters	74-67-71-67=272	−9	Playoff	(Zimbabwe) Mark McNulty
2	Feb 7, 1999	Dimension Data Pro-Am	66-65-70-72=273	−15	5 strokes	(South Africa) Steve van Vuuren

Southern Africa Tour playoff record (1–1)

No.	Year	Tournament	Opponent	Result
1	1995	Telkom South African Masters	(Zimbabwe) Mark McNulty	Won with birdie on first extra hole
2	1998	Stenham Royal Swazi Sun Open	(Eswatini) Paul Friedlander	Lost to par on second extra hole

=== Nationwide Tour wins (2) ===
No.	Date	Tournament	Winning score	To par	Margin of victory	Runners-up
1	Oct 3, 2004	Mark Christopher Charity Classic	65-69-72-66=272	−12	3 strokes	(United States) Scott Gutschewski, (United States) Bubba Watson
2	Jan 27, 2008	Panama Movistar Championship	65-68-73-71=277	−3	1 stroke	(India) Arjun Atwal, (United States) Jeff Klauk

=== Canadian Tour wins (2) ===
No.	Date	Tournament	Winning score	To par	Margin of victory	Runner(s)-up
1	Jul 10, 1994	Xerox Manitoba Open	68-70-68-70=276	−8	2 strokes	(Canada) Mike Weir
2	Aug 6, 1995	Canadian Masters	66-72-62-68=268	−16	10 strokes	(United States) Danny Ellis, (United States) Philip Hatchett, (United States) Greg Petersen, (South Africa) Roger Wessels

=== Tour de las Américas wins (5) ===
- 1996 Abierto del Litoral
- 1998 Peru Open
- 1999 Peru Open, Argentine Open
- 2000 Peru Open

=== PGA Tour Champions wins (2) ===
No.	Date	Tournament	Winning score	To par	Margin of victory	Runner(s)-up
1	Aug 24, 2014	Boeing Classic	69-63-68=200	−16	Playoff	(United States) Mark Brooks
2	May 5, 2024	Insperity Invitational	65-70=135 (Note: Shortened to 36 holes due to weather.)	−9	1 stroke	(Australia) Stuart Appleby, (United States) Joe Durant

PGA Tour Champions playoff record (1–0)

No.	Year	Tournament	Opponent	Result
1	2014	Boeing Classic	(United States) Mark Brooks	Won with birdie on first extra hole

== Results in major championships ==
Tournament	1992	1993	1994	1995	1996	1997	1998	1999	2000	2001	2002
U.S. Open	CUT				CUT	T24				T52	CUT
The Open Championship						CUT	T29	T10	CUT		
PGA Championship								T68	T9	T51	

Note: Dunlap never played in the Masters Tournament.

Top 10
Did not play

CUT = missed the half-way cut
"T" = tied

== Results in The Players Championship ==
Tournament	1997	1998	1999	2000	2001	2002
The Players Championship	CUT			T3	T15	CUT

Top 10
Did not play

CUT = missed the halfway cut
"T" indicates a tie for a place

== Results in World Golf Championships ==
Tournament	1999	2000	2001
Match Play			R64
Championship	T48		NT^{1}
Invitational			

^{1}Cancelled due to 9/11

Did not play

QF, R16, R32, R64 = Round in which player lost in match play
"T" = Tied
NT = No tournament

== Results in senior major championships ==
Results not in chronological order

Tournament	2014	2015	2016	2017	2018	2019	2020	2021	2022	2023	2024	2025	2026
Senior PGA Championship	CUT	T50	T31	T28	T56	T44	NT	CUT	CUT	T37	T21	CUT	CUT
The Tradition	T59	T65	T48	T27	T27		NT	71	T36	T47	T39	WD	
U.S. Senior Open	T9	T7	T14	T29	T44	59	NT				T64	CUT	CUT
Senior Players Championship	T58	T12	T49	T14	T24	T39	T19	T52	T44	WD	T26	T68	
Senior British Open Championship	T6	T19	T14	T15	CUT	T29	NT			CUT	CUT	CUT	

Top 10
Did not play

"T" = tied
CUT = missed the halfway cut
WD = withdrew
NT = no tournament due to COVID-19 pandemic

== See also ==
- 1995 PGA Tour Qualifying School graduates
- 1998 PGA Tour Qualifying School graduates
- 2011 PGA Tour Qualifying School graduates
- List of Florida Gators men's golfers on the PGA Tour
