= Scott Petersen =

American professional golfer (born 1970)

Personal information
- Nationality: United States
- Born: July 4, 1970 (age 56) Williston, North Dakota, U.S.
- Height: 6 ft 3 in (1.91 m)
- Weight: 195 lb (88 kg; 13.9 st)

Career
- Sport: Golf
- College: University of Tulsa; University of Colorado
- Turned professional: 1993
- Former tour: Nationwide Tour
- Professional wins: 6

Number of wins by tour
- Korn Ferry Tour: 1
- Other: 5

Scott Petersen (born July 4, 1970) is an American professional golfer.

== Career ==
Petersen was born in Williston, North Dakota. He played college golf at the University of Tulsa and the University of Colorado. At Colorado, he was an All-American his senior year. Petersen turned professional in 1993.

Between 1996 and 2007, Petersen played on the Nationwide Tour (1996, 2000–07) and the Canadian Tour (1997–99). He won twice on the Canadian Tour and once on the Nationwide Tour.

== Professional wins (6) ==
=== Buy.com Tour wins (1) ===
No.	Date	Tournament	Winning score	Margin of victory	Runners-up
1	Oct 15, 2000	Buy.com Inland Empire Open	−20 (65-69-65-69=268)	4 strokes	(United States) Keith Clearwater, (United States) Craig Kanada, (United States) Chris Smith

=== Canadian Tour wins (2) ===
No.	Date	Tournament	Winning score	Margin of victory	Runner(s)-up
1	Jul 20, 1997	Infiniti Championship	−13 (68-70-71-66=275)	2 strokes	(United States) Mike Grob
2	Aug 1, 1999	Samsung Canadian PGA Championship	−13 (68-66-69=203) (Note: Shortened to 54 holes due to weather.)	2 strokes	(United States) Jeff Bloom, (United States) Derek Gilchrist

=== Other wins (3) ===
- 1991 Colorado Stroke Play Championship
- 1993 Colorado Stroke Play Championship
- 2000 Colorado Open
