= James Lepp =

Canadian professional golfer (born 1983)

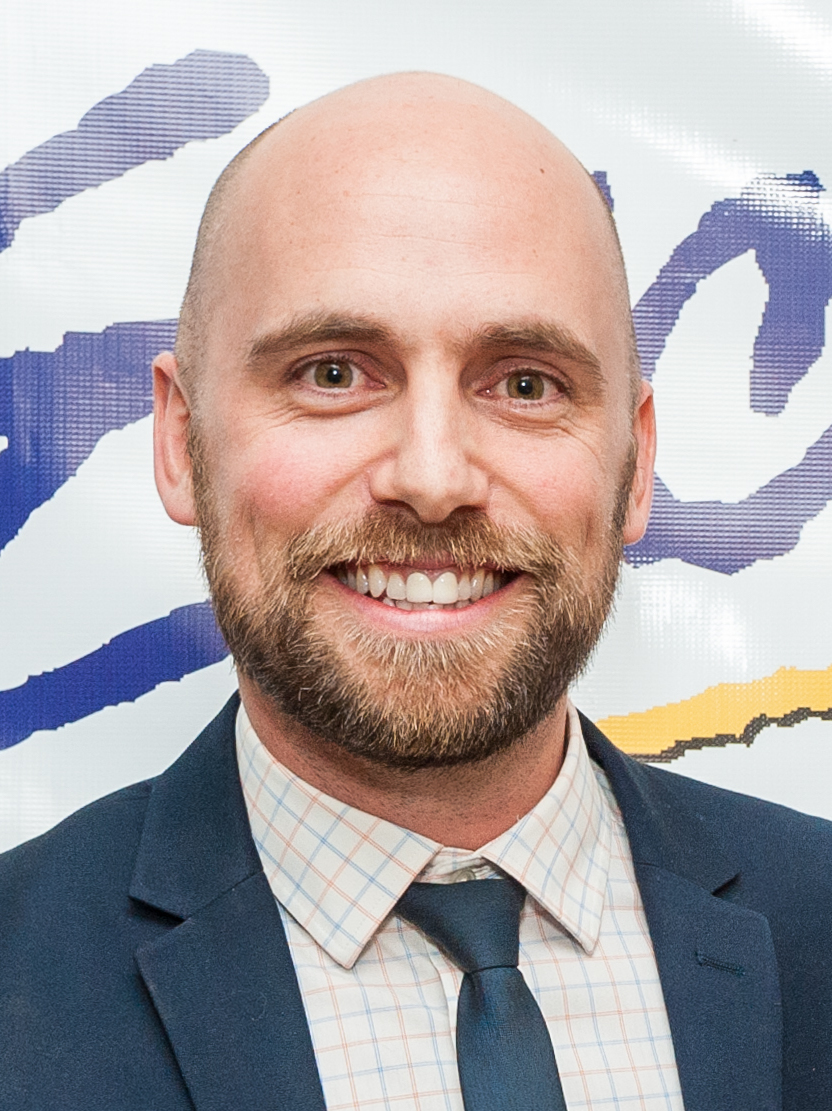
- Lepp in 2017

Personal information
- Nationality: Canada
- Born: November 19, 1983 (age 42) Abbotsford, British Columbia, Canada
- Height: 5 ft 10 in (1.78 m)
- Weight: 160 lb (73 kg; 11 st)

Career
- Sport: Golf
- College: University of Illinois; University of Washington
- Turned professional: 2006
- Former tour: Canadian Tour
- Professional wins: 2

James Lepp (born November 19, 1983) is a Canadian professional golfer and entrepreneur.

== Career ==
Lepp was born in Abbotsford, British Columbia and attended high school at the Mennonite Educational Institute. He began his collegiate golf career at the University of Illinois. In 2005, he won the NCAA Division I Championship while playing for the University of Washington, the first Canadian male to do so. He turned professional in 2006 and joined the Canadian Tour in 2007, winning one event.

In the movie Sideways, Lepp is shown briefly while Myles and Jack are watching golf on TV.

Lepp stopped competing on professional tours in 2010 as he launched Kikkor Golf, a sneaker-inspired golf shoe brand. In 2016, he transitioned Kikkor Golf into a new limited edition sneaker brand called Six Hundred Four. The Six Hundred Four flagship store, called a "Sneaker Gallery", is located in the Gastown neighbourhood of Vancouver, British Columbia.

== Amateur wins ==
this list may be incomplete

- 2001 Canadian Junior Amateur
- 2002 Canadian Junior Amateur, British Columbia Amateur
- 2003 British Columbia Amateur, Pacific Coast Amateur
- 2004 British Columbia Amateur
- 2005 British Columbia Amateur, NCAA Division I Championship

== Professional wins (2) ==
=== Canadian Tour wins (2) ===
No.	Date	Tournament	Winning score	Margin of victory	Runners-up
1	Aug 3, 2003	Greater Vancouver Classic (as an amateur)	−19 (66-70-66-67=269)	5 strokes	(United States) Nathan Fritz, (United States) Mark Johnson
2	Jun 24, 2007	Greater Vancouver Charity Classic (2)	−14 (69-66-71-68=274)	4 strokes	(United States) Anthony Rodriguez, (United States) Eugene Smith

== Team appearances ==
Amateur

- Eisenhower Trophy (representing Canada): 2002, 2004
