= Wilf Homenuik =

Canadian professional golfer (born 1935)

Personal information
- Full name: Wilfred Homenuik
- Nationality: Canada
- Born: December 30, 1935 (age 90) Kamsack, Saskatchewan
- Spouse: Jean Young
- Children: Gwen, Scott and Jason

Career
- Sport: Golf
- Status: Professional
- Former tour: Canadian Tour
- Professional wins: 17

Achievements and awards
- Canadian Golf Hall of Fame: 2005

Wilfred Homenuik (born December 30, 1935) is a Canadian professional golfer. His surname is also spelled Homeniuk in many records.

== Career ==
Homenuik was born in Kamsack, Saskatchewan, and is one of seven brothers, many of whom have also played golf, most notably Stan and Ted.

Homenuik appeared in seven Canadian Opens and three World Cups. Together with Moe Norman and George Knudson, Homenuik is regarded as one of the greatest Canadian golfers of his time, and has been inducted into many golf Halls of Fame.

In late 1966, Homenuik made it onto the PGA Tour at PGA Tour Qualifying School.

In 1976, Homenuik later became the head professional of the Highlands Golf Course in London, Ontario. In 2003, he was still working as a teaching professional at the Oakdale Golf & Country Club in Toronto, Ontario; the club has named one of its three nines after him.

== Awards and honors ==
- In 1998, Homenuik was inducted into the Yorktown Sports Hall of Fame.
- In 2005, he was inducted into the Canadian Golf Hall of Fame.

== Amateur wins ==
- 1953 Saskatchewan Amateur
- 1954 Saskatchewan Junior
- 1956 Manitoba Amateur
- 1957 Manitoba Amateur

== Professional wins (18) ==
=== Canadian wins (12) ===
- 1961 Alberta Open, Manitoba Open
- 1965 Canadian PGA Championship, Alberta Open
- 1966 Panama Open
- 1967 Millar Trophy
- 1968 Millar Trophy
- 1971 Canadian PGA Championship
- 1972 Manitoba Open
- 1973 Labatt "50" Invitational
- 1978 Lake Worth Open
- 1990 CPGA Ontario Senior Champion

=== Other wins (6) ===
- 1965 Peru Open
- 1968 Grand Bahama Open
- 1971 Lima Open, Shreveport Open
- 1972 West Palm Beach Open
- 1973 Lake Michigan Classic

== Team appearances ==
- World Cup (representing Canada): 1965, 1971, 1974

== See also ==
- 1966 PGA Tour Qualifying School graduates
