= Richard Backwell =

Australian professional golfer (born 1963)

Personal information
- Nationality: Australia
- Born: 28 December 1963 (age 62)
- Height: 1.78 m (5 ft 10 in)
- Weight: 82 kg (181 lb; 12.9 st)

Career
- Sport: Golf
- College: Texas Wesleyan University
- Turned professional: 1990
- Former tours: Japan Golf Tour; Canadian Tour; Japan Challenge Tour; Champions Tour
- Professional wins: 34

Number of wins by tour
- Japan Golf Tour: 1
- Other: 33

Richard Backwell (born 28 December 1963) is an Australian professional golfer.

== Career ==
Backwell played on the Japan Golf Tour from 1994 to 2002, winning once.

== Professional wins (34) ==
=== Japan Golf Tour wins (1) ===
No.	Date	Tournament	Winning score	Margin of victory	Runner-up
1	16 Apr 2000	Tsuruya Open	−10 (73-65-71-69=278)	Playoff	(Japan) Hidemichi Tanaka

Japan Golf Tour playoff record (1–0)

No.	Year	Tournament	Opponent	Result
1	2000	Tsuruya Open	(Japan) Hidemichi Tanaka	Won with par on fourth extra hole

=== Canadian Tour wins (1) ===
No.	Date	Tournament	Winning score	Margin of victory	Runner-up
1	14 Jun 1992	Alberta Open	−4 (72-66-73-65=276)	Playoff	(United States) Tony Mollica

=== Japan Challenge Tour wins (1) ===
- 1997 Komatsu Country Cup

=== PGA of Australia Legends Tour wins (31) ===
- 2014 (6) Col Crawford BMW Legends Pro-Am (with George Serhan), promotions r us Pro-Am, Swanbury Penglase SA PGA Senior Championship, SIFA Samoa Senior Open, Springwood Country Club Legends Pro-Am, Suttons Hyandai Arncliffe Legends Pro-Am
- 2015 (5) The Grange Legends Pro-Am (with three others), SIFA Samoa Seniors Open, Brisbane Legends Pro-Am, TJS Facility Services City Golf Club Legends Pro-Am, Cricks Nambour Twin Waters Legends Pro-Am
- 2017 (2) City of Greater Bendigo Heathcote Golf Club Legends Pro-Am, Royal Queensland Cup
- 2018 (6) Australian Valve Group Legends Pro-Am, Samoa Senior Open, Pacific Harbour Legends Pro-Am, Mercedes Benz Cairns - Cairns Classic, Lismore Legends Pro-Am, Sunshine Coast Masters
- 2019 (4) Samoa Senior Open, Ulton, Lindsay Australia & Ken's Plumbing Plus Bargara Legends Pro-Am, Pacific Harbour Legends Pro-Am (with Steve Conran), Bartons / BMD QLD Senior PGA Championship (with Peter Senior)
- 2021 (3) Maroochy River Legends Pro-Am, Provincial Distributors City Legends Pro-Am, Innovative Planning Solutions Headland Legends Pro-Am (with Brad Burns)
- 2022 (3) Higgins Coatings Portsea Legends Pro-Am (with three others), Australian Valve Group - Watts Legends Pro-Am, Atlas Golf Services Noosa Legends Pro-Am
- 2023 (2) LVTong Wolston Park Legends Pro-Am, Lismore Workers Legends Pro-Am (with Gregory Rix)

== Team appearances ==
Amateur

- Australian Men's Interstate Teams Matches (representing Queensland): 1984, 1985
