= 2023 PGA Tour Canada =

Golf tour season

2023 PGA Tour Canada season
- Duration: June 15, 2023 – September 10, 2023
- Number of official events: 10
- Most wins: (United States) Davis Lamb (2) (United States) Hayden Springer (2)
- Order of Merit: (United States) Hayden Springer

The 2023 PGA Tour Canada was the 37th and final season of the Canadian Tour, and the 10th under the operation and running of the PGA Tour.

In April, the PGA Tour announced that the 2023 season would be the last, as from 2024 the tour would merge with PGA Tour Latinoamérica, creating PGA Tour Americas.

== Schedule ==
The following table lists official events during the 2023 season.

Date	Tournament	Location	Purse (C$)	Winner (Note: The number in parentheses after each winner's name is the number of PGA Tour Canada events they had won up to and including that tournament. It is rare for someone to accumulate many wins on PGA Tour Canada as success at this level usually leads to promotion to the Korn Ferry Tour.)	OWGR points
Jun 18	Royal Beach Victoria Open	British Columbia	200,000	(Canada) Étienne Papineau (1)	3.14
Jun 25	Elk Ridge Saskatchewan Open	Saskatchewan	225,000	(United States) John Pak (1)	3.35
Jul 2	ATB Classic	Alberta	225,000	(United States) Davis Lamb (1)	3.62
Jul 16	Quebec Open	Quebec	200,000	(United States) Davis Lamb (2)	4.76
Jul 23	Commissionaires Ottawa Open	Ontario	200,000	(Canada) Stuart Macdonald (1)	4.91
Jul 30	Osprey Valley Open	Ontario	225,000	(United States) Davis Shore (1)	5.40
Aug 6	Windsor Championship	Ontario	200,000	(United States) Sam Choi (1)	5.05
Aug 27	CentrePort Canada Rail Park Manitoba Open	Manitoba	200,000	(United States) Hayden Springer (1)	5.03
Sep 3	CRMC Championship	United States	200,000	(China) Cao Yi (1)	5.42
Sep 10	Fortinet Cup Championship	Alberta	225,000	(United States) Hayden Springer (2)	3.56

== Order of Merit ==
The Order of Merit was titled as the Fortinet Cup and was based on tournament results during the season, calculated using a points-based system. The top five players on the Order of Merit earned status to play on the 2024 Korn Ferry Tour.

Position	Player	Points
1	(United States) Hayden Springer	1,311
2	(United States) Sam Choi	1,276
3	(United States) Davis Lamb	1,173
4	(Canada) Étienne Papineau	982
5	(China) Cao Yi	963

== See also ==
- 2023 PGA Tour Latinoamérica
