= Derek James =

South African professional golfer (born 1960)

Personal information
- Full name: Derek James
- Nationality: South Africa
- Born: 28 September 1960 (age 66) Durban, South Africa
- Height: 1.82 m (6 ft 0 in)

Career
- Sport: Golf
- Turned professional: 1984
- Former tours: Sunshine Tour; Canadian Tour
- Professional wins: 11

Derek James (born 28 September 1960) is a South African professional golfer currently playing on the Sunshine Tour.

== Career ==
In 1960, James was born in Durban, South Africa. He was the 1984 South African Strokeplay champion, his biggest amateur win.

James turned professional later that year and joined the Sunshine Tour. He won his first title there in 1991, and would add six more wins between then and 1994. He was also runner-up in the South African Open in 1992. He won the Canadian Tournament Players' Championship in 1994, in addition to picking up three minor tournament victories in the United States.

James retired as a touring professional golf. He is now the head professional at Southbroom Golf Club.

== Personal life ==
James lives in Southbroom, South Africa with his wife and two children.

== Amateur wins ==
- 1984 South Africa Strokeplay Champion

== Professional wins (11) ==
=== Canadian Tour wins (1) ===
No.	Date	Tournament	Winning score	Margin of victory	Runner-up
1	24 Jul 1994	Infiniti Championship	−13 (69-70-67-65=271)	2 strokes	(Canada) Ray Stewart

=== South African wins (7) ===
- 1991 (1) River Sun Challenge
- 1992 (3) Iscor Newcastle Classic, Kalahari Classic, Mercedez Benz Golf Challenge
- 1993 (2) Lombard Tryes Classic, Momentum Life Classic
- 1994 (1) Sanlam Cancer Challenge

=== Other wins (3) ===
- 1985 Western Massachusetts Open
- 2 other minor tournaments in the United States

== Team appearances ==
Amateur

- Eisenhower Trophy (representing South Africa): 1982
- South African National Team: 1982, 1983, 1984
