= Brandt Jobe =

American professional golfer (born 1965)

Personal information
- Full name: Brandt William Jobe
- Nationality: United States
- Born: August 1, 1965 (age 61) Oklahoma City, Oklahoma, U.S.
- Height: 5 ft 11 in (1.80 m)
- Weight: 180 lb (82 kg; 13 st)
- Spouse: Jennifer
- Children: 2, including Jackson

Career
- Sport: Golf
- College: University of California, Los Angeles
- Turned professional: 1988
- Current tour: PGA Tour Champions
- Former tours: PGA Tour; Japan Golf Tour; Asia Golf Circuit; Nationwide Tour; Canadian Tour; Hooters Jordan Tour
- Professional wins: 16
- Highest ranking: 30 (September 27, 1998)

Number of wins by tour
- Japan Golf Tour: 6
- PGA Tour Champions: 2
- Other: 6

Best results in major championships
- Masters Tournament: T14: 1999
- PGA Championship: T16: 1999
- U.S. Open: T18: 2008
- The Open Championship: T41: 2006

Achievements and awards
- Canadian Tour Order of Merit winner: 1990
- Asia Golf Circuit Order of Merit winner: 1995

Brandt William Jobe (born August 1, 1965) is an American professional golfer who currently plays on the PGA Champions Tour. He has also played on the PGA Tour, Nationwide Tour and the Japan Golf Tour.

== Early life and amateur career ==
Jobe was born in Oklahoma City, Oklahoma. He attended UCLA where he was a member of the 1988 NCAA Division I Men's Championship winning team.

== Professional career ==
In 1988, Jobe turned professional. In 1990, Jobe led the Order of Merit on the Canadian Tour. He won membership of the PGA Tour at 1990 PGA Tour Qualifying School graduates. However, he only made five cuts during the 1991 season. After a few unsettled seasons, during which he won the 1995 Asia Golf Circuit Order of Merit, he established himself on the Japan Golf Tour, where he played from 1995 to 1999 and won six tournaments. He returned to the PGA Tour as special temporary member in September 1999. He has played steadily despite a freak accident in his garage at home. After slicing his hand and severing several fingers with a shattered push broom, Jobe had significant hand and wrist surgery in 2003. He never won on the PGA Tour, but has tied for second place four times, including two in 2005 when he played on a major medical exemption.

Jobe finished 30th on the Nationwide Tour in 2010, which was not enough for a PGA Tour Card, but exempted him through the final stage of Q School, where he finished tied for sixth and earned his 2011 card. In June 2011, Jobe achieved his best finish in six years when he tied for second at the Memorial Tournament, one stroke behind Steve Stricker.

Jobe won the Champions Tour qualifying school to earn his tour card for 2016. On June 11 2017, he recorded his first Champions Tour victory at the Principal Charity Classic with a 14-under-par score of 202.

On August 25, 2019, Jobe won his second PGA Tour Champions victory at the Boeing Classic.

== Personal life ==
Jobe and his wife, Jennifer have a son and a daughter together. Their son, Jackson, was selected third overall by the Detroit Tigers in the 2021 Major League Baseball draft.

== Professional wins (16) ==
=== PGA of Japan Tour wins (6) ===
No.	Date	Tournament	Winning score	Margin of victory	Runner(s)-up
1	May 28, 1995	Mitsubishi Galant Tournament	−26 (65-67-65-69=266)	6 strokes	(Japan) Masahiro Kuramoto
2	Oct 12, 1997	Tokai Classic	−10 (68-72-69-69=278)	Playoff	(United States) Brian Watts
3	Oct 19, 1997	Golf Digest Tournament	−17 (68-69-63-67=267)	Playoff	(Japan) Toru Suzuki
4	May 17, 1998	Japan PGA Championship	−8 (70-70-72-68=280)	Playoff	(Japan) Masashi Ozaki
5	May 24, 1998	Ube Kosan Open	−17 (69-64-68-70=271)	2 strokes	(Japan) Shigeki Maruyama
6	Jun 28, 1998	Gateway to The Open Mizuno Open	−13 (67-65-74-69=275)	4 strokes	(Japan) Yoshi Mizumaki, (Japan) Toru Suzuki

PGA of Japan Tour playoff record (3–0)

No.	Year	Tournament	Opponent	Result
1	1997	Tokai Classic	(United States) Brian Watts	Won with birdie on first extra hole
2	1997	Golf Digest Tournament	(Japan) Toru Suzuki	Won with birdie on first extra hole
3	1998	Japan PGA Championship	(Japan) Masashi Ozaki	Won with par on first extra hole

=== Asia Golf Circuit wins (4) ===
No.	Date	Tournament	Winning score	Margin of victory	Runner-up
1	Mar 13, 1994	Thailand Open	−12 (65-72-69-70=276)	4 strokes	(United States) Lee Porter
2	Feb 12, 1995	Sabah Masters	−8 (69-73-67-71=280)	3 strokes	(Malaysia) Periasamy Gunasegaran
3	Mar 26, 1995	Sempati Bali Open	−15 (66-72-66-69=273)	2 strokes	(Taiwan) Lin Keng-chi
4	Apr 16, 1995	Maekyung Bando Fashion Open	−8 (73-72-66-69=280)	4 strokes	(South Korea) Choi Sang-ho

=== Canadian Tour wins (2) ===
No.	Date	Tournament	Winning score	Margin of victory	Runner-up
1	Jun 10, 1990	Canadian Airlines-George Williams B.C. Open	−13 (72-67-64=203) (Note: Shortened to 54 holes due to weather.)	3 strokes	(Canada) Steve Chapman
2	Jun 6, 1993	Payless Open	−18 (67-67-65-67=266)	3 strokes	(Canada) Philip Jonas

=== Hooters Jordan Tour wins (1) ===
No.	Date	Tournament	Winning score	Margin of victory	Runners-up
1	Jun 5, 1994	Hooters Classic	−16 (66-68-67-71=272)	Playoff	(United States) John Hough, (United States) Andy Morse, (United States) Mike Swartz

=== Other wins (1) ===
- 1992 Colorado Open

=== PGA Tour Champions wins (2) ===
No.	Date	Tournament	Winning score	Margin of victory	Runner(s)-up
1	Jun 11, 2017	Principal Charity Classic	−14 (67-66-69=202)	1 stroke	(United States) Scott McCarron, (United States) Kevin Sutherland
2	Aug 25, 2019	Boeing Classic	−18 (69-66-63=198)	3 strokes	(United States) Tom Pernice Jr.

== Playoff record ==
PGA Tour playoff record (0–1)

No.	Year	Tournament	Opponents	Result
1	2005	BellSouth Classic	(India) Arjun Atwal, (United States) Rich Beem, (United States) Phil Mickelson, (Spain) José María Olazábal	Mickelson won with birdie on fourth extra hole Olazábal eliminated by par on third hole Atwal and Jobe eliminated by par on first hole

== Results in major championships ==
Tournament	1990	1991	1992	1993	1994	1995	1996	1997	1998	1999
Masters Tournament										T14
U.S. Open	CUT		CUT		T39	T62	CUT			
The Open Championship						CUT			T52	CUT
PGA Championship									CUT	T16

Tournament	2000	2001	2002	2003	2004	2005	2006	2007	2008	2009
Masters Tournament	48						T32			
U.S. Open	CUT	T52		T35		T33	CUT		T18	
The Open Championship							T41			
PGA Championship							CUT			

Tournament	2010	2011	2012	2013
Masters Tournament				
U.S. Open		T23		CUT
The Open Championship				
PGA Championship		T45		

Did not play

CUT = missed the halfway cut
"T" indicates a tie for a place.

=== Summary ===
Tournament	Wins	2nd	3rd	Top-5	Top-10	Top-25	Events	Cuts made
Masters Tournament	0	0	0	0	0	1	3	3
U.S. Open	0	0	0	0	0	2	13	7
The Open Championship	0	0	0	0	0	0	4	2
PGA Championship	0	0	0	0	0	1	4	2
Totals	0	0	0	0	0	4	24	14

- Most consecutive cuts made – 4 (2001 U.S. Open – 2006 Masters)
- Longest streak of top-10s – 0

== Results in The Players Championship ==
Tournament	1999	2000	2001	2002	2003	2004	2005	2006	2007	2008	2009	2010	2011	2012
The Players Championship	CUT		CUT	CUT	T32	T74		CUT					CUT	CUT

Did not play

CUT = missed the halfway cut
"T" indicates a tie for a place

== Results in World Golf Championships ==
Tournament	1999	2000	2001	2002	2003	2004	2005	2006
Match Play	R32	R64						R64
Championship			NT^{1}				T25	
Invitational								

^{1}Cancelled due to 9/11

Did not play

QF, R16, R32, R64 = Round in which player lost in match play
"T" = Tied
NT = No tournament

== See also ==
- 1990 PGA Tour Qualifying School graduates
- 2010 PGA Tour Qualifying School graduates
