= Deer Creek Open =

Ben Hogan Kansas City Classic
Tournament information
- Location: Overland Park, Kansas
- Established: 1990
- Course: Deer Creek Golf Course
- Par: 72
- Tour: Ben Hogan Tour
- Format: Stroke play
- Prize fund: US$100,000
- Month played: August
- Final year: 1990

Tournament record score
- Aggregate: 206 Trevor Dodds (1990)
- To par: −10 as above

Final champion
- (Namibia) Trevor Dodds
- Location in the United States Location in Kansas

The Deer Creek Open was a professional golf tournament on the Ben Hogan Tour in 1990. Also known as the Ben Hogan Kansas City Classic, it was played at Deer Creek Golf Course in Overland Park, Kansas.

In 1990 the winner earned $20,000.

== Winners ==
Year	Winner	Score	To par	Margin of victory	Runners-up
Ben Hogan Kansas City Classic
1990	(Namibia) Trevor Dodds	206	−10	1 stroke	(United States) Jeff Maggert (United States) Eric Manning (United States) Dennis Trixler
