= 1989–90 Southern Africa Tour =

Golf tour season

1989–90 Southern Africa Tour season
- Duration: 15 November 1989 – 10 March 1990
- Number of official events: 12
- Most wins: (South Africa) Fulton Allem (2) (United States) John Daly (2) (South West Africa) Trevor Dodds (2)
- Order of Merit: (South Africa) John Bland

The 1989–90 Southern Africa Tour was the 19th season of the Southern Africa Tour, the main professional golf tour in South Africa since it was formed in 1971.

== Season outline ==
A variety of local golfers had success at the beginning of the season. South African Des Terblanche won the inaugural event, the Railfreight Bloemfontein Classic. It was his first victory on his home tour. The next tournament was the Minolta Copiers Match Play, a medal match play event, held at Sun City Golf Course. In the quarterfinals, Fulton Allem tied the course record with a 65 to defeat competitor Hugh Baiocchi. In the following two rounds Allem defeated "tournament favourite" David Frost and John Bland to win the event. Frost, however, came back and won the next event, the unofficial Nedbank Million Dollar Challenge. Baiocchi, meanwhile, won the next official tournament on the calendar, the Twee Jonge Gezellen Masters. In mid-January, the Lexington PGA Championship was held, hosted by Wanderers Golf Course. Allem opened with a course record 61 to take the lead. He would go on to win the event.

In the middle of the season, a newly turned professional from America named John Daly had much success. Daly won the seventh tournament of the year, the AECI Charity Classic by one over Northern Irishman David Feherty. Two weeks later, Daly won again at the Hollard Royal Swazi Sun Classic, defeating South African John Bland by two strokes.

At the end of the season, there was a three-horse race to win the Order of Merit among Bland, the leader, with Wayne Westner directly behind him, and Tony Johnstone in third. The top two would receive automatic entries in the 1990 Open Championship. Bland won the 11th event of the season, the Dewar's White Label Trophy, "to clinch the circuit Order of Merit title."

== Schedule ==
The following table lists official events during the 1989–90 season.

Date	Tournament	Location	Purse (R)	Winner (Note: The number in brackets after each winner's name is the number of Southern Africa Tour events they had won up to and including that tournament. This information is only shown for Southern Africa Tour members.)	OWGR points	Notes
18 Nov	Railfreight Bloemfontein Classic	Orange Free State	250,000	(South Africa) Des Terblanche (1)	8	
24 Nov	Minolta Copiers Match Play	Transvaal	250,000	(South Africa) Fulton Allem (6)	8	
17 Dec	Twee Jonge Gezellen Masters	Cape	250,000	(South Africa) Hugh Baiocchi (11)	8	
13 Jan	ICL International	Transvaal	250,000	(South Africa) Gavan Levenson (5)	8	
20 Jan	Lexington PGA Championship	Transvaal	250,000	(South Africa) Fulton Allem (7)	8	
27 Jan	Protea Assurance South African Open	Transvaal	280,000	(South West Africa) Trevor Dodds (2)	8	
3 Feb	AECI Charity Classic	Transvaal	250,000	(United States) John Daly (1)	8	
10 Feb	Goodyear Classic	Cape	250,000	(Canada) Philip Jonas (1)	8	
18 Feb	Hollard Royal Swazi Sun Classic	Swaziland	250,000	(United States) John Daly (2)	8	
24 Feb	Palabora Classic	Transvaal	250,000	(Zimbabwe) Tony Johnstone (12)	8	
3 Mar	Dewar's White Label Trophy	Natal	250,000	(South Africa) John Bland (14)	8	
10 Mar	Trustbank Tournament of Champions	Transvaal	250,000	(South West Africa) Trevor Dodds (3)	8	Tour Championship

=== Unofficial events ===
The following events were sanctioned by the Southern Africa Tour, but did not carry official money, nor were wins official.

Date	Tournament	Location	Purse (R)	Winner	OWGR points	Notes
10 Dec	Nedbank Million Dollar Challenge	Transvaal	US$2,500,000	(South Africa) David Frost	14	Limited-field event

== Order of Merit ==
The Order of Merit was based on prize money won during the season, calculated in South African rand.

Position	Player	Prize money (R)
1	(South Africa) John Bland	180,893
2	(South Africa) Wayne Westner	135,094
3	(South West Africa) Trevor Dodds	133,359
4	(United States) John Daly	123,704
5	(Zimbabwe) Tony Johnstone	119,225
