= Jim Rutledge =

Canadian professional golfer (born 1959)

Personal information
- Full name: James Edgar Rutledge
- Nationality: Canada
- Born: August 26, 1959 (age 67) Victoria, British Columbia
- Height: 5 ft 11 in (1.80 m)
- Weight: 180 lb (82 kg; 13 st)

Career
- Sport: Golf
- Turned professional: 1978
- Former tours: PGA Tour; European Tour; Asian Tour; Asia Golf Circuit; Nationwide Tour; Canadian Tour; Champions Tour
- Professional wins: 9

Number of wins by tour
- PGA Tour of Australasia: 1
- Korn Ferry Tour: 1
- Other: 8

Best results in major championships
- Masters Tournament: DNP
- PGA Championship: DNP
- U.S. Open: DNP
- The Open Championship: T57: 1990

James Edgar Rutledge (born August 26, 1959) is a Canadian professional golfer. He has played on the Canadian Tour, Asia Golf Circuit, Nationwide Tour, PGA Tour, and Champions Tour.

== Early life ==
Rutledge was born in Victoria, British Columbia. He won the Canadian Juvenile Championship in 1975 at the Gorge Vale Golf Club in Victoria and the Canadian Junior Championship in 1977.

== Professional career ==
In 1978, Rutledge turned professional. For the first 20 years of his career, Rutledge would play in Asia in the winter and in Canada for the rest of the year. He did not do this from 1988 to 1992 though. During that time Rutledge was a member of the European Tour, where his best finish on the Order of Merit came in 1990 when he finished in 55th, earning £75,274. He played in his first major at the 1990 Open Championship, where he was high on the leaderboard going into the weekend, but ended up finishing T-57. He played in his second and last major the following year at the 1991 Open Championship but he missed the cut. Rutledge's best finish on the Asia Golf Circuit Order of Merit was third in 1994 and 1995. He has finished third on the Canadian Tour's Order of Merit three times. He is one of the winningest players in Canadian Tour history, winning six times on tour.

Rutledge was a member of the Nationwide Tour between 2001 and 2009, except for 2007 when he was a member of the PGA Tour. Rutledge's first Nationwide Tour win in 2006 at the ING New Zealand PGA Championship, helped him finish in 14th on the money list, which earned him his PGA Tour card for 2007. As the second oldest rookie in the history of the PGA Tour, he was not able to retain his tour card. Rutledge only made 5 of 23 cuts, with his best finish coming at the Mayakoba Golf Classic at Riviera Maya-Cancun where he finished T-31. He does not play in Asia anymore but still plays on the Canadian Tour.

After turning 50 on August 26, 2009, Rutledge has made several appearances on the Champions Tour, with some success. He earned conditional exempt status for the 2011 Champions Tour season, by finishing eighth at the final qualifying school tournament on November 19, 2010. Only the top five players in that event gained full status for 2011. He fully qualified for the 2012 Champions Tour after finishing tied for second at qualifying school in 2011.

== Amateur wins ==
- 1975 Canadian Juvenile Championship
- 1977 Canadian Junior Championship

== Professional wins (9) ==
=== Asia Golf Circuit wins (1) ===
No.	Date	Tournament	Winning score	Margin of victory	Runners-up
1	Mar 5, 1995	Classic Indian Open	−8 (69-69-74-68=280)	1 stroke	(Sweden) Daniel Chopra, (United States) Bob May

Asia Golf Circuit playoff record (0–2)

No.	Year	Tournament	Opponents	Result
1	1994	Maekyung Open	(South Korea) Kim Jong-duck, (United States) Mike Tschetter	Kim won with par on second extra hole Rutledge eliminated by birdie on first hole
2	1996	Mitsubishi Motors Southwoods Open	(United States) Don Walsworth, (Italy) Manny Zerman	Zerman won with par on second extra hole Walsworth eliminated by par on first hole

=== Nationwide Tour wins (1) ===
No.	Date	Tournament	Winning score	Margin of victory	Runners-up
1	Feb 26, 2006	ING New Zealand PGA Championship^{1}	−9 (75-68-72-64=279)	1 stroke	(Australia) Brett Rumford, (Australia) Jarrod Lyle

^{1}Co-sanctioned by the PGA Tour of Australasia

=== Canadian Tour wins (3) ===
No.	Date	Tournament	Winning score	Margin of victory	Runner(s)-up
1	Jun 11, 1989	Canadian Airlines-George Williams B.C. Open	−16 (65-67-71-65=268)	2 strokes	(Canada) Rick Gibson, (Mexico) Carlos Espinosa
2	Jun 26, 1994	Alberta Open	−9 (68-66-69-68=271)	1 stroke	(South Africa) Roger Wessels
3	Aug 27, 1995	Montclair Kings County Classic	−8 (72-76-68-64=280)	3 strokes	(United States) Guy Hill, (South Africa) Manny Zerman

=== Earlier Canadian wins (3) ===
No.	Date	Tournament	Winning score	Margin of victory	Runner(s)-up
1	Sep 29, 1979	British Columbia Open	−6 (68-68-71=210)	2 strokes	(Canada) Dan Halldorson
2	Sep 13, 1981	British Columbia Open (2)	−13 (66-67-67=200)	7 strokes	(Canada) Steve Berry, (United States) Dave Fowler, (Canada) Mark Shushack, (Canada) Gord Todd
3	Sep 16, 1984	CPGA Championship	−16 (71-65-70-66=272)	6 strokes	(Canada) Ray Stewart

=== Other wins (1) ===
- 2000 Niagara Classic

== Results in major championships ==
Tournament	1990	1991
The Open Championship	T57	CUT

CUT = missed the half-way cut
"T" = tied
Note: Rutledge only played in The Open Championship.

== Results in senior major championships ==
Results not in chronological order

Tournament	2010	2011	2012	2013	2014	2015
Senior PGA Championship	T45	T34	CUT	T6	CUT	CUT
The Tradition				T54	T53	
U.S. Senior Open	T32	T23	T33			
Senior Players Championship	8	T32	T14	T27	T54	74
Senior British Open Championship		T49	CUT	CUT		

Top 10
Did not play

CUT = missed the halfway cut
"T" indicates a tie for a place

== Canadian national team appearances ==
- World Cup: 1984, 1995, 2006
- Dunhill Cup: 1993, 1996

== See also ==
- 2006 Nationwide Tour graduates
