= Willie Lamb =

Scottish-Canadian golfer

Personal information
- Full name: William Lamb
- Nationality: Scotland; Canada
- Born: December 15, 1902 Montrose, Angus, Scotland
- Died: January 28, 1969 (aged 66) St. Petersburg, Florida, U.S.

Career
- Sport: Golf
- Status: Professional
- Professional wins: 11

Achievements and awards
- Canadian Golf Hall of Fame: 1985

William Lamb (December 15, 1902 – January 28, 1969) was a Scottish-Canadian professional golfer.

Lamb was born in Montrose, Scotland. Having moved to Canada in 1924, he had a successful tournament career, highlighted by winning the Canadian PGA Championship on five occasions, in 1928, 1929, 1930, 1933, and 1935. He also won the Millar Trophy, originally awarded for the Ontario PGA Match Play championship and later the Canadian PGA Match Play, in 1930 and the open championships of Ontario and Quebec.

Lamb has been widely recognised for his achievement and contributions to golf, highlighted by his induction into the Canadian Golf Hall of Fame in 1985. He has also been inducted into the halls of fame of the PGA of Canada and Ontario Golf.

Lamb served as the head professional at several golf clubs in Ontario, most notably at Lambton Golf Club in Toronto, where he remained for 30 years until his retirement in 1964.

== Professional wins ==
- 1924 Mexican Open
- 1928 Canadian PGA Championship
- 1929 Canadian PGA Championship
- 1930 Canadian PGA Championship, Millar Trophy
- 1931 Quebec Open
- 1932 Ontario Open, Quebec Open
- 1933 Canadian PGA Championship, Quebec Open
- 1935 Canadian PGA Championship
