= Ontario Open Heritage Classic =

Tournament information
- Location: Ontario, Canada
- Established: 1999
- Tour: Canadian Tour
- Format: Stroke play
- Final year: 2002

Tournament record score
- Aggregate: 264 Arron Oberholser (1999)
- To par: −20 Arron Oberholser (1999)

Final champion
- (United States) Mike Grob

The Ontario Open Heritage Classic was a golf tournament on the Canadian Tour that was held in Ontario, Canada. It was founded in 1999, three years after the long-standing Ontario Open was last played, and ran for four years, through 2002. It was hosted at a different venue every year.

In the inaugural tournament, Arron Oberholser set a new Canadian Tour record for the largest winning margin when he finished 11 strokes ahead of Ian Leggatt and Tony Carolan.

== Winners ==
Year	Venue	Winner	Score	Ref
2002	Grandview	(United States) Mike Grob	274 (−14)	
2001	Fort William	(Canada) Craig Matthew	272 (−16) (Note: Matthew won with a par on the second hole of a sudden-death playoff.)	
2000	Osprey Links	(China) Zhang Lianwei	204 (−9) (Note: Final round cancelled due to rain.)	
1999	Sault Ste. Marie	(United States) Arron Oberholser	264 (−20) (Note: Oberholser's 11 stroke winning margin is a Canadian Tour record.)	
