= Mike Grob =

American golfer (born 1964)

Personal information
- Nationality: United States
- Born: May 6, 1964 (age 62) Billings, Montana, U.S.
- Height: 5 ft 11 in (1.80 m)
- Weight: 180 lb (82 kg; 13 st)

Career
- Sport: Golf
- College: University of Arkansas
- Turned professional: 1988
- Current tour: Champions Tour
- Former tours: PGA Tour; Buy.com Tour; Canadian Tour
- Professional wins: 10

Mike Grob (born May 6, 1964) is an American professional golfer. He has been a member of the PGA Tour.

== Career ==
Grob won the Montana Amateur three consecutive years: in 1983, 1984, and 1985.

Grob spent 1999–2001 on the PGA Tour's developmental tour. His best finish was 2nd place at the 2000 Buy.com New Mexico Classic.

Grob finished T-34 at the 2002 PGA Tour Q-School which earned him his tour card for the 2003 PGA Tour season.

During the 2003 season, Grob made 14 cuts in 27 tournaments with two top-10 finishes. He earned $354,286 that season, which placed him 150th on the money list and gave him conditional status for the 2004 PGA Tour season. In the 2004 season, he entered 13 tournaments, made 5 cuts, and failed to retain his card for the 2005 PGA Tour season.

Grob played on the Canadian Tour in 2002 and from 2005 to 2012. He is the all-time money leader on the Canadian Tour. He is also a six-time winner on the Canadian Tour.

== Professional wins (10) ==
=== Canadian Tour wins (6) ===
No.	Date	Tournament	Winning score	Margin of victory	Runner(s)-up
1	Aug 31, 1997	Montclair PEI Classic	−10 (68-69-71-70=278)	2 strokes	(United States) Perry Parker
2	Jul 26, 1998	Canadian Masters	−16 (69-70-65-64=268)	2 strokes	(United States) Ben Walter
3	Jun 16, 2002	Ontario Open Heritage Classic	−14 (66-70-65-73=274)	2 strokes	(United States) Hank Kuehne
4	Jun 25, 2006	Times Colonist Open	−11 (66-71-65-67=269)	1 stroke	(Namibia) Trevor Dodds, (United States) John Lieber
5	Jul 1, 2007	ATB Financial Classic	−24 (66-67-65-66=264)	3 strokes	(Scotland) Alan McLean
6	Jun 14, 2009	City of Surrey Invitational	−16 (66-71-68-67=272)	2 strokes	(Canada) Graham DeLaet

=== Other wins (4) ===
- 2006 Orange Lake Classic
- 2007 Bridgewater Classic, Rocksprings Classic, Sanctuary Ridge Open

== See also ==
- 2002 PGA Tour Qualifying School graduates
