= Trevor Dodds =

Namibian professional golfer

Personal information
- Full name: Trevor George Dodds
- Nationality: South West Africa (until 1990); Namibia (1990–)
- Born: 26 September 1959 (age 67) Windhoek, South West Africa
- Height: 6 ft 2 in (1.88 m)
- Weight: 215 lb (98 kg; 15.4 st)
- Spouse: Bianca Dodds
- Children: 1

Career
- Sport: Golf
- College: Lamar University
- Turned professional: 1985
- Former tours: PGA Tour; Sunshine Tour; Nationwide Tour; Canadian Tour; U.S. Golf Tour; Champions Tour
- Professional wins: 14
- Highest ranking: 79 (10 May 1998)

Number of wins by tour
- PGA Tour: 1
- Sunshine Tour: 3
- Korn Ferry Tour: 3
- Other: 7

Best results in major championships
- Masters Tournament: CUT: 1999
- PGA Championship: T62: 1998
- U.S. Open: CUT: 1990, 1994, 1998, 2002
- The Open Championship: T57: 1998

Achievements and awards
- Canadian Tour Order of Merit winner: 1995, 1996

Trevor George Dodds (born 26 September 1959) is a Namibian professional golfer who formerly played on the PGA Tour. He is known for winning the 1998 edition of Greater Greensboro Chrysler Classic.

== Early life ==
Dodds was born in Windhoek, South West Africa.

== Professional career ==
In 1985, Dodds turned professional. He won the Canadian Tour Order of Merit in 1995 and 1996. Dodds has compiled 13 wins on four different tours: the PGA Tour, Nationwide Tour, Sunshine Tour and the Canadian Tour.

== Professional wins (14) ==
=== PGA Tour wins (1) ===
No.	Date	Tournament	Winning score	Margin of victory	Runner-up
1	26 Apr 1998	Greater Greensboro Chrysler Classic	−12 (68-69-70-69=276)	Playoff	(United States) Scott Verplank

PGA Tour playoff record (1–0)

No.	Year	Tournament	Opponent	Result
1	1998	Greater Greensboro Chrysler Classic	(United States) Scott Verplank	Won with par on first extra hole

=== Southern Africa Tour wins (3) ===
Legend
Tour Championships (1)
Other Southern Africa Tour (2)

No.	Date	Tournament	Winning score	Margin of victory	Runner(s)-up
1	18 Dec 1988	Goodyear Classic	−8 (70-68-69-69=276)	1 stroke	(Zimbabwe) Tony Johnstone, (South Africa) Wayne Westner
2	27 Jan 1990	Protea Assurance South African Open	−3 (72-71-72-70=285)	1 stroke	(United States) Hugh Royer III
3	10 Mar 1990	Trustbank Tournament of Champions	−16 (70-65-68-69=272)	1 stroke	(United States) Fran Quinn

=== Buy.com Tour wins (3) ===
No.	Date	Tournament	Winning score	Margin of victory	Runner(s)-up
1	12 Aug 1990	Ben Hogan Kansas City Classic	−10 (72-66-68=206)	1 stroke	(United States) Jeff Maggert, (United States) Eric Manning, (United States) Dennis Trixler
2	15 Jun 1997	Nike Miami Valley Open	−22 (63-64-66-69=262)	6 strokes	(United States) Joe Daley
3	13 May 2001	Buy.com Virginia Beach Open	−11 (65-68-73-71=277)	3 strokes	(South Africa) Deane Pappas

=== Canadian Tour wins (6) ===
No.	Date	Tournament	Winning score	Margin of victory	Runner(s)-up
1	9 Jul 1995	Xerox Manitoba Open	−9 (73-70-69-67=279)	3 strokes	(Canada) Ian Leggatt, (Canada) Rob McMillan (a), (South Africa) Manny Zerman
2	20 Aug 1995	CPGA Championship	−12 (68-67-71-70=276)	1 stroke	(United States) J. J. West
3	23 Jun 1996	Henry Singer Alberta Open	−10 (68-69-67-66=270)	1 stroke	(Canada) Ian Leggatt
4	30 Jun 1996	ED TEL PLAnet Open	−15 (63-66-70-66=265)	4 strokes	(Canada) Arden Knoll
5	21 Jul 1996	Infiniti Championship	−10 (67-71-73-67=278)	2 strokes	(Canada) Arden Knoll, (Canada) Ian Leggatt, (Australia) Stephen Leaney
6	28 Jul 1996	Canadian Masters	−10 (68-66-68-72=274)	1 stroke	(United States) Chris DiMarco, (United States) Ken Duke, (Canada) Arden Knoll

=== U.S. Golf Tour wins (1) ===
No.	Date	Tournament	Winning score	Margin of victory	Runner-up
1	29 Apr 1990	Port St. Lucie Open	−6 (69-74-71-68=282)	2 strokes	(United States) Dave Miley

== Results in major championships ==
Tournament	1990	1991	1992	1993	1994	1995	1996	1997	1998	1999	2000	2001	2002
Masters Tournament										CUT			
U.S. Open	CUT				CUT				CUT				CUT
The Open Championship									T57				
PGA Championship									T62				

Did not play

CUT = missed the half-way cut
"T" = tied

== Team appearances ==
- World Cup (representing Namibia): 1996, 1997

== See also ==
- 1985 PGA Tour Qualifying School graduates
- 1986 PGA Tour Qualifying School graduates
- 1988 PGA Tour Qualifying School graduates
- 1990 PGA Tour Qualifying School graduates
- 1992 PGA Tour Qualifying School graduates
- 1997 Nike Tour graduates
- 2003 PGA Tour Qualifying School graduates
