= Mike Weir =

Canadian professional golfer (born 1970)

Mike Weir CM OOnt
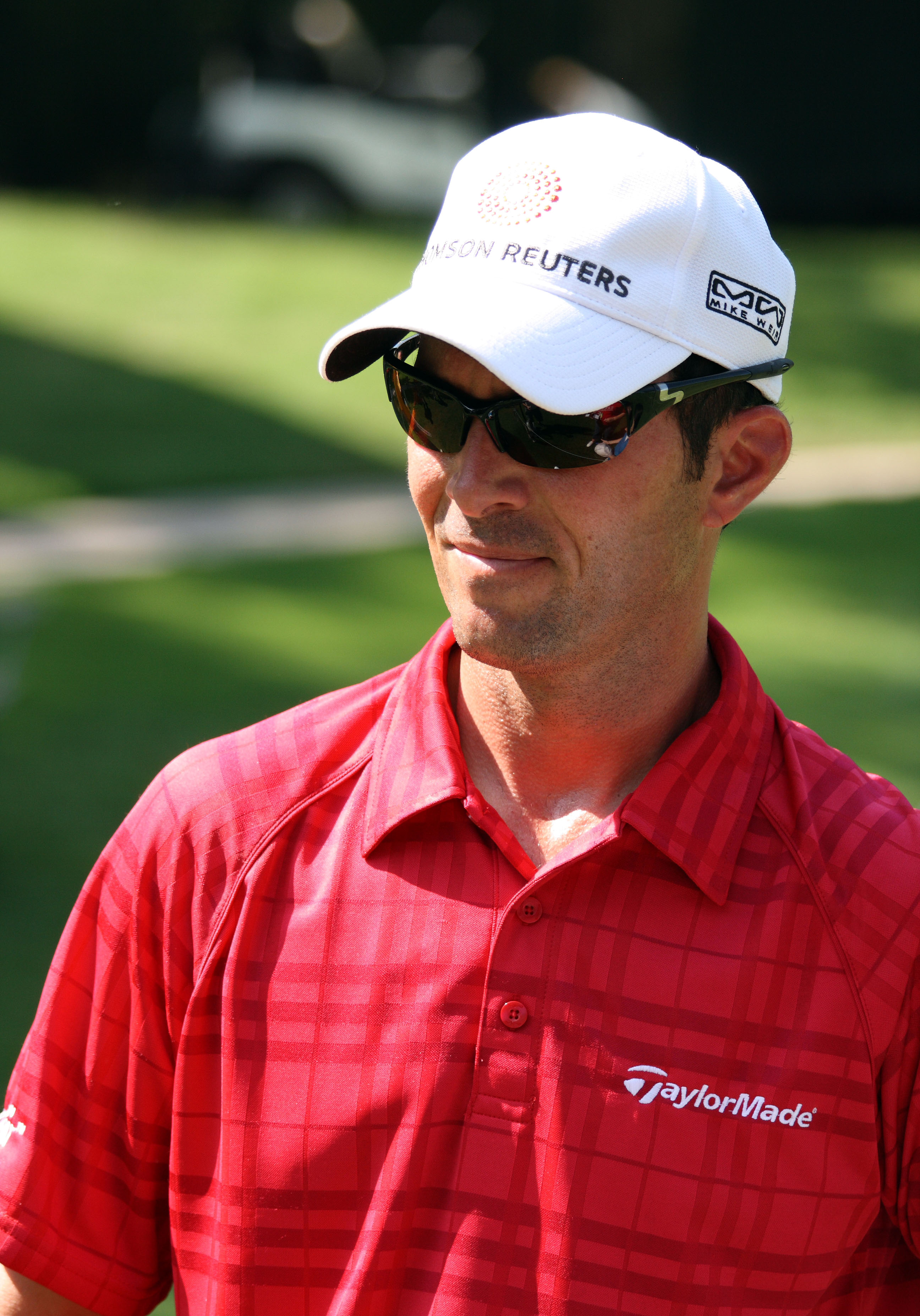
- Weir in 2010

Personal information
- Full name: Michael Richard Weir
- Nickname: Weirsy
- Nationality: Canada
- Born: May 12, 1970 (age 56) Sarnia, Ontario, Canada
- Height: 5 ft 9 in (1.75 m)
- Weight: 155 lb (70 kg; 11.1 st)
- Spouses: Bricia Weir (m. 1994; div. 2014) Michelle Money (m. 2023)
- Children: 2

Career
- Sport: Golf
- College: Brigham Young University
- Turned professional: 1992
- Current tours: PGA Tour; PGA Tour Champions
- Former tour: Korn Ferry Tour
- Professional wins: 14
- Highest ranking: 3 (June 15, 2003)

Number of wins by tour
- PGA Tour: 8
- European Tour: 2
- PGA Tour Champions: 1
- Other: 5

Best results in major championships (wins: 1)
- Masters Tournament: Won: 2003
- PGA Championship: 6th: 2006
- U.S. Open: T3: 2003
- The Open Championship: T8: 2007

Achievements and awards
- Canadian Tour Order of Merit winner: 1997
- Lou Marsh Trophy: 2003
- Lionel Conacher Award: 2000, 2001, 2003
- Canadian Golf Hall of Fame: 2009
- Canada's Sports Hall of Fame: 2017

Michael Richard Weir, CM OOnt (born May 12, 1970) is a Canadian professional golfer. He currently plays on the PGA Tour Champions. He spent over 110 weeks in the top-10 of the Official World Golf Ranking between 2001 and 2005. He plays golf left-handed and is best known for winning the Masters Tournament in 2003, making him the only Canadian man to ever win a major championship.

== Early life ==
Born in Sarnia, Ontario, Weir grew up in the Sarnia suburb of Brights Grove. He learned to play golf at Huron Oaks Golf Course, and was coached there by Steve Bennett. Like many Canadian boys, his first sport was hockey; he was a natural left-handed shot, and began playing golf left-handed as a follow-on from his hockey experience. Weir was fortunate in that his godfather's son played left-handed and had a partial set of spare clubs that he handed down to Weir—three woods and four irons. From his earnings as a caddy and pro shop worker, he purchased a left-handed wedge that he used until the grip wore out. When he was 12, he won a junior tournament in which the first prize was a complete set of irons; he replaced his original four irons with the clubs he had won. While working at Huron Oaks, he also met Jack Nicklaus at age 11, when the golf legend came to the club to play an exhibition. This meeting set the stage for a pivotal moment in Weir's career.

Weir gave up hockey in his early teenage years when he realized he would not grow past average size and that golf was his best sport. However, he had received advice that he might be an even better golfer if he switched to playing right-handed. In 1984, Weir decided to write Nicklaus for advice as to whether to make the switch. Nicklaus quickly wrote back and told Weir, "If you are a good player left-handed, don't change anything—especially if that feels natural to you."

He never thought of switching to right-handed play again, and still keeps the letter, now framed, in his home.

== Amateur career ==
He attended St. Michael Elementary School in Brights Grove and St. Clair Secondary School in Sarnia, winning the Ontario Junior Championship in 1988. He is a graduate of Brigham Young University (majoring in Recreation Management), and won the Ontario Amateur Championship in 1990 and 1992. He tied for 2nd at the 1991 Canadian Amateur Championship, and finished clear second in that event in 1992. He was an All-American selection at BYU in 1992 on the Second Team.

== Professional career ==
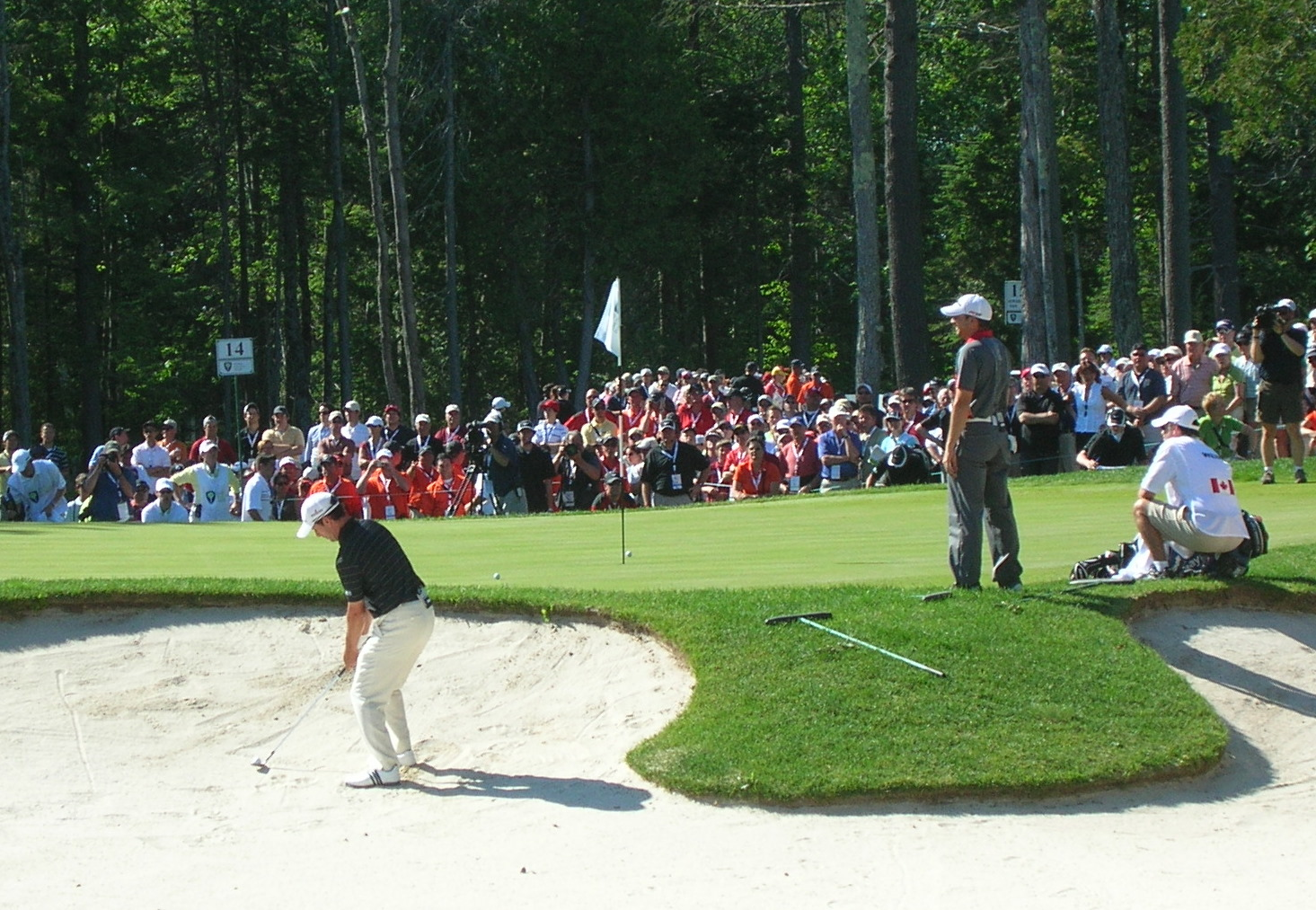
Mike Weir at the 2009 Telus World Skins Game, Lévis, Canada

Weir turned professional in 1992, and started on the Canadian Professional Golf Tour, where he won three events. He also played some events on the Asian PGA Tour early in his career. He first reached the PGA Tour in 1998, but lost his playing privileges, due to insufficient performance. He had to requalify, and did so by being medalist at the final Qualifying School tournament.

Weir's first PGA Tour win came at the 1999 Air Canada Championship in Surrey, British Columbia. The victory made him the first Canadian to win a PGA Tour event in Canada in 45 years. He shared the 54 holes lead at the 1999 PGA Championship with Tiger Woods but finished T-10. He won The Tour Championship in a playoff in 2001.

Weir began the 2003 season in impressive fashion, winning two tournaments on the West Coast Swing. He first won the Bob Hope Chrysler Classic in Palm Springs, California, and then followed with a win at Riviera Country Club near Los Angeles, at the Nissan Open.

In April, Weir won the 2003 Masters Tournament at Augusta, Georgia, one of the four major championships. He is the only Canadian male ever to win a professional major championship. At the time he won the Masters, Weir became only the second left-handed golfer to win any of the four majors, the other being Bob Charles, who won the British Open forty years earlier (Phil Mickelson, Bubba Watson, and Brian Harman have since won majors as left-handed golfers). Weir is a right-hander who plays golf left-handed, a trait he shares with fellow PGA Tour pro and major champion Mickelson.

In June, Weir tied for third at the U.S. Open, the second of the majors, which moved him to third in the Official World Golf Ranking, his highest ranking. For his outstanding play in 2003, Weir won the Lou Marsh Trophy for outstanding Canadian athlete of the year. He maintained his position in the world's top ten ranking into 2004.

In February 2004, Weir joined the ranks of a select few players including Ben Hogan to win consecutive championships at the Nissan Open, becoming the sixth player in Nissan Open history to notch back-to-back wins, and the first since Corey Pavin (1994, 1995). He was the 20th player to post multiple wins at the Nissan Open.

Weir went more than three-and-a-half years after his second win at the Nissan Open before his next win on tour. Working with Mike Bennett and Andy Plummer on a new swing showed some positive results (two top tens, including a tie for eighth at the Open Championship). While working on the swing changes, he had dipped in the world rankings to a point that he did not automatically qualify for the Presidents Cup matches in 2007, held at the Royal Montreal Golf Club. He got to play in the tournament he helped bring to Canada because he was picked by International team captain Gary Player as one of his discretionary selections. This turned out to be an inspired choice as Weir went on to beat current number one Tiger Woods in a heated match, despite his team losing the Cup. When asked, Weir enthusiastically stated, "When I look back on my career, this may be even more special than winning the Masters." His swing changes, coupled with the momentum from his Presidents Cup performance, culminated in his first win in over three years at the Fry's Electronics Open in October 2007. This victory in Arizona tied Weir with George Knudson for most PGA Tour wins by a Canadian, with eight.

Golf Digest magazine of March 2010 reported that Weir had returned to work with instructor Mike Wilson, who was his coach during his most successful period in the early 2000s. Weir was going away from the 'stack-and-tilt' method and working on reclaiming his swing as developed with Wilson. In October 2010 Weir said he was planning to rely less on swing coach Mike Wilson, since he thought he did not need a teacher but a set of eyes, whether it's Mike or someone else. I'm taking ownership of what I'm trying to accomplish when I make a swing ... I feel like I don't need anybody to tell me what to do. I know what I need to do, added Weir. In July 2011, Weir rehired 'stack and tilt' creators Mike Bennett and Andy Plummer.

Weir's 2010 season ended early with a torn ligament on his right elbow. He began 2011 on a major medical exemption, which means he would have to earn the difference between his 2010 earning and $786,977 (equivalent to Troy Merritt, who finished with the 125th and final exempt spot on the Tour) in five starts to retain full Tour status. Otherwise, he could use one of two special exemptions he holds because of career earnings to play the PGA Tour in 2011, but that is something he hoped to avoid doing. Weir had trouble making cuts and did not finish high enough to retain significant status on the Tour, being demoted to the Past Champions category, among the lowest in the PGA Tour exemption priority rankings.

Weir's caddy, from 1999 to 2010, was fellow Ontarian Brennan Little. In January 2011, Weir hired veteran caddy Pete Bender.

After an injury plagued 2010 and 2011 seasons, Weir began his 2012 season at the AT&T Pebble Beach National Pro-Am after six months out of the game recovering from elbow surgery. As Weir did not have full status on the PGA Tour, he activated his European Tour membership for 2012, which came after he won the Masters in 2003. He missed the cut at the AT&T Pebble Beach National Pro-Am, finishing at +6. He missed his next two cuts on the PGA Tour following Pebble Beach but made the weekend on the European Tour in the Open de Andalucia. Weir used a special exemption reserved for the top 25 on the career PGA Tour money list to regain his PGA Tour playing privileges for 2013.

Playing on a top 50 career money list exemption for 2014, Weir nearly earned his first win in seven years at the Byron Nelson Championship, but finished two strokes behind Brendon Todd for his first top ten since 2010. The runner-up finish was Weir's best result since his last win in 2007. The result elevated Weir over 350 places in the world rankings up to 238th. Though Weir missed the FedEx Cup playoffs, he finished inside the top 125 on the money list, which left him exempt for the 2014–15 season.

Weir withdrew from the 2015 RBC Canadian Open, and took an indefinite leave of absence from golf competition, according to a statement he posted Friday, July 17, 2015, on his Twitter account. He called it an "extremely difficult" decision to withdraw from his country's national open. It would have been Weir's 25th appearance in the event.

Weir joined the TNT broadcast team for the 2016 PGA Championship, as an on-course reporter.

Weir was named as a captain's assistant to Nick Price for the 2017 Presidents Cup competition and to Ernie Els for the 2019 Presidents Cup.

In 2019, Weir announced he would play the entire season on the Web.com Tour, taking advantage of an exemption for former PGA Tour members aged 48 and 49 either as one final attempt to regain a PGA Tour card or in preparation for PGA Tour Champions.

Weir turned 50 in May 2020 and joined the PGA Tour Champions.

In May 2021, Weir won his first tournament on the PGA Tour Champions, the Insperity Invitational in Woodlands, Texas. Aside from the five-man 2010 Telus Skins Game, this was his first worldwide win since 2007.

== Personal life ==
Weir currently lives in Sandy, Utah, with his two daughters.

Creekside Estate Winery, near Lincoln, Ontario, began producing wine for Weir in 2005, and as of 2007 had released a Merlot, Chardonnay, Sauvignon blanc, Cabernet-Merlot, Cabernet-Shiraz and Icewine. His Icewine Vidal was named by Travel + Leisure Golf magazine as one of its top five golf-related wines. Weir announced plans to open his own winery in the summer of 2008.

On December 17, 2007, The Thomson Corporation (now Thomson Reuters) announced it will be the lead corporate sponsor for Weir for a five-year term beginning in January 2008, replacing Bell Canada.

== Awards and honours ==
- In 2003, Weir was appointed to the Order of Ontario.
- In 2007, Weir was appointed as a Member of the Order of Canada and later invested on November 5, 2009.
- In 2009, Weir was inducted into the Canadian Golf Hall of Fame.
- In 2010, Weir was selected as #12 on a list of Canada's 100 Greatest Athletes of All Time.
- In 2017, Weir was awarded the Order of Sport, marking his induction into Canada's Sports Hall of Fame.
- There is a street in Draper, Utah named after him.

== Professional wins (14) ==
=== PGA Tour wins (8) ===
Legend
Major championships (1)
World Golf Championships (1)
Tour Championships (1)
Other PGA Tour (5)

No.	Date	Tournament	Winning score	Margin of victory	Runner(s)-up
1	Sep 5, 1999	Air Canada Championship	−18 (68-70-64-64=266)	2 strokes	(United States) Fred Funk
2	Nov 12, 2000	WGC-American Express Championship	−11 (68-75-65-69=277)	2 strokes	(England) Lee Westwood
3	Nov 4, 2001	The Tour Championship	−14 (68-66-68-68=270)	Playoff	(South Africa) Ernie Els, (Spain) Sergio García, (United States) David Toms
4	Feb 2, 2003	Bob Hope Chrysler Classic	−30 (67-64-65-67-67=330)	2 strokes	(United States) Jay Haas
5	Feb 23, 2003	Nissan Open	−9 (72-68-69-66=275)	Playoff	(United States) Charles Howell III
6	Apr 13, 2003	Masters Tournament	−7 (70-68-75-68=281)	Playoff	(United States) Len Mattiace
7	Feb 22, 2004	Nissan Open (2)	−17 (66-64-66-71=267)	1 stroke	(Japan) Shigeki Maruyama
8	Oct 21, 2007	Fry's Electronics Open	−14 (69-64-65-68=266)	1 stroke	(Australia) Mark Hensby

PGA Tour playoff record (3–2)

No.	Year	Tournament	Opponent(s)	Result
1	2000	Michelob Championship at Kingsmill	(United States) David Toms	Lost to par on first extra hole
2	2001	The Tour Championship	(South Africa) Ernie Els, (Spain) Sergio García, (United States) David Toms	Won with birdie on first extra hole
3	2003	Nissan Open	(United States) Charles Howell III	Won with birdie on second extra hole
4	2003	Masters Tournament	(United States) Len Mattiace	Won with bogey on first extra hole
5	2004	Bell Canadian Open	(Fiji) Vijay Singh	Lost to par on third extra hole

=== Canadian Tour wins (3) ===
No.	Date	Tournament	Winning score	Margin of victory	Runners-up
1	Jul 25, 1993	Infiniti Tournament Players Championship	−4 (70-73-72-69=284)	1 stroke	(Canada) Rémi Bouchard, (United States) Steve Stricker, (Canada) Richard Zokol
2	Jun 8, 1997	BC TEL Pacific Open	−13 (65-69-68-69=271)	1 stroke	(Australia) Kenny Druce, (United States) Ken Duke
3	Jul 27, 1997	Canadian Masters	−18 (64-67-66-69=266)	8 strokes	(New Zealand) Steven Alker, (United States) Ken Duke, (Mexico) Carlos Espinosa, (Canada) Kari Kekki

=== Other wins (2) ===
No.	Date	Tournament	Winning score	Margin of victory	Runner-up
1	Jun 29, 1999	Telus Skins Game	$210,000	$115,000	(United States) David Duval
2	Jun 24, 2010	Telus World Skins Game (2)	$270,000	$195,000	(South Africa) Retief Goosen

Other playoff record (0–1)

No.	Year	Tournament	Opponents	Result
1	2006	CVS/pharmacy Charity Classic (with (United States) Brad Faxon)	(South Africa) Tim Clark and (Zimbabwe) Nick Price	Lost to birdie on second extra hole

=== PGA Tour Champions wins (1) ===
No.	Date	Tournament	Winning score	Margin of victory	Runners-up
1	May 2, 2021	Insperity Invitational	−10 (66-68=134) (Note: Shortened to 36 holes due to weather.)	2 strokes	(United States) John Daly, (United States) Tim Petrovic, (United States) David Toms

== Major championships ==
=== Wins (1) ===
Year	Championship	54 holes	Winning score	Margin	Runner-up
2003	Masters Tournament	2 shot deficit	−7 (70-68-75-68=281)	Playoff^{1}	(United States) Len Mattiace

^{1}Defeated Len Mattiace in a sudden-death playoff: Weir (5), Mattiace (6).

=== Results timeline ===
Results not in chronological order in 2020.

Tournament	1999	2000	2001	2002	2003	2004	2005	2006	2007	2008	2009
Masters Tournament		T28	T27	T24	1	CUT	T5	T11	T20	T17	T46
U.S. Open	CUT	T16	T19	CUT	T3	T4	T42	T6	T20	T18	T10
The Open Championship	T37	T52	CUT	T69	T28	T9	CUT	T56	T8	T39	CUT
PGA Championship	T10	T30	T16	T34	T7	CUT	T47	6	CUT	T42	CUT

Tournament	2010	2011	2012	2013	2014	2015	2016	2017	2018
Masters Tournament	T43	CUT	CUT	CUT	T44	CUT	CUT	CUT	CUT
U.S. Open	T80			T28					
The Open Championship	CUT								
PGA Championship	CUT								

Tournament	2019	2020	2021	2022	2023	2024	2025	2026
Masters Tournament	CUT	T51	CUT	CUT	CUT	CUT	CUT	CUT
PGA Championship								
U.S. Open	CUT							
The Open Championship		NT						

Win
Top 10
Did not play

CUT = missed the halfway cut
"T" = tied
NT = no tournament due to COVID-19 pandemic

=== Summary ===
Tournament	Wins	2nd	3rd	Top-5	Top-10	Top-25	Events	Cuts made
Masters Tournament	1	0	0	2	2	6	27	12
PGA Championship	0	0	0	0	3	4	12	8
U.S. Open	0	0	1	2	4	8	14	11
The Open Championship	0	0	0	0	2	2	12	8
Totals	1	0	1	4	11	20	65	39

- Most consecutive cuts made – 8 (twice)
- Longest streak of top-10s – 2 (twice)

== Results in The Players Championship ==
Tournament	2000	2001	2002	2003	2004	2005	2006	2007	2008	2009	2010
The Players Championship	CUT	T44	T19	T27	CUT	T17	T22	T37	T32	T14	CUT

CUT = missed the halfway cut
"T" indicates a tie for a place

== World Golf Championships ==
=== Wins (1) ===
Year	Championship	54 holes	Winning score	Margin	Runner-up
2000	WGC-American Express Championship	1 shot deficit	−11 (68-75-65-69=277)	2 strokes	(England) Lee Westwood

=== Results timeline ===
Tournament	1999	2000	2001	2002	2003	2004	2005	2006	2007	2008	2009	2010
Match Play		R32		R32	R32	R32	R64	R16	R64	R64	R64	R32
Championship	T30	1	NT^{1}	T15	T28		T18		T50	T20	T35	T26
Invitational		T24	25	T24	T23	T41	T36	T22	WD		10	T55
Champions												

^{1}Cancelled due to 9/11

Win
Top 10
Did not play

QF, R16, R32, R64 = Round in which player lost in match play
"T" = Tied
WD = Withdrew
NT = No tournament
Note that the HSBC Champions did not become a WGC event until 2009.

== Results in senior major championships ==
Results not in chronological order

Tournament	2020	2021	2022	2023	2024	2025	2026
Senior PGA Championship	NT	T5	T4	T37	T14	CUT	T36
The Tradition	NT	T25	T40	T15	T46	T27	T45
U.S. Senior Open	NT	T2	CUT	T35	WD	CUT	CUT
Senior Players Championship	T10	T20	T25	T38	T17	T70	T42
Senior British Open Championship	NT			CUT			

Top 10
Did not play

CUT = missed the halfway cut
WD = withdrew
"T" indicates a tie for a place
NT = no tournament due to COVID-19 pandemic

== PGA Tour career summary ==
Season	Wins (Majors)	Earnings (US$)	Rank
1997	0	23,709	287
1998	0	275,017	131
1999	1	1,497,014	23
2000	1	2,576,479	6
2001	1	2,825,436	11
2002	0	881,390	78
2003	3 (1)	5,236,410	5
2004	1	2,761,536	14
2005	0	1,363,467	56
2006	0	1,907,974	33
2007	1	2,015,053	35
2008	0	3,195,135	14
2009	0	2,205,672	26
2010	0	559,092	151
2011	0	23,312	240
2012	0	0	–
2013	0	194,510	184
2014	0	854,413	109
2015	0	72,800	215
2016	0	0	–
2017	0	0	–
2018	0	5,760	259
2019	0	27,643	244
Career*	8 (1)	27,977,076	42

*As of the 2019 season.

=== Summary of PGA Tour performances ===
- Starts – 454
- Cuts made – 267
- Wins – 8
- 2nd-place finishes – 10
- 3rd-place finishes – 8
- Top 10 finishes – 69
- Top 25 finishes – 140

* Complete through the 2019 season

== Team appearances ==
Professional

- World Cup (representing Canada): 1997, 2000, 2001, 2002, 2006, 2007
- Presidents Cup (International Team): 2000, 2003 (tie), 2005, 2007, 2009

== See also ==
- 1997 PGA Tour Qualifying School graduates
- 1998 PGA Tour Qualifying School graduates
- List of celebrities who own wineries and vineyards
- List of Canadian sports personalities
