= Calgary Open =

Golf tournament in Alberta, Canada

Tournament information
- Location: Alberta, Canada
- Established: 1997
- Course: Heritage Pointe Golf Club
- Par: 72
- Tour: Canadian Tour
- Format: Stroke play
- Final year: 2000

Tournament record score
- Aggregate: 266 Scott Wearne (1998)
- To par: −22 Scott Wearne (1998)

Final champion
- (United States) Brian Kontak

The Calgary Open was a golf tournament on the Canadian Tour that was held at Heritage Pointe Golf Club in Heritage Pointe near Calgary, Alberta, Canada. It was founded in 1997, and was the first time the tour had based an event in the Calgary area. Telus was the tournament's main sponsor and as such it was titled as the Telus Calgary Open. It ran for four years through 2000, when Telus sought to more evenly distribute their sponsorship of tour events across the season.

== Winners ==
Year	Winner	Score	Ref
2000	(United States) Brian Kontak	269 (−19)	
1999	(United States) Jaime Gomez	268 (−20)	
1998	(Australia) Scott Wearne	266 (−22)	
1997	(South Africa) Ian Hutchings	271 (−17)	
