= Canadian Masters (golf) =

Tournament information
- Location: Ancaster, Ontario, Canada
- Established: 1994
- Course: Heron Point Golf Links
- Tour: Canadian Tour
- Format: Stroke play
- Final year: 1999

Tournament record score
- Aggregate: 266 Mike Weir (1997)
- To par: −18 Mike Weir (1997)

Final champion
- (Canada) Ray Stewart

The Canadian Masters was a golf tournament on the Canadian Tour between 1994 and 1999. It was held at Heron Point Golf Links in Ancaster, Ontario, Canada.

The tournament founded with the intention of developing it into a C$0.5 million event within five years. The prize fund quickly increased, from C$100,000 in the first year to C$200,000 in the second and C$250,000 the third and fourth, making it the richest on tour. However, while it remained the joint richest event on the Canadian Tour, prize money dropped back down to C$200,000 in 1998 and 1999, the final time it was held.

The winner of the Canadian Masters was awarded the George Knudson Memorial Trophy, named in memory of one of Canada's most successful professional golfers.

== Winners ==
| Year | Winner | Score | Ref. |
|---|---|---|---|
| 1999 | (Canada) Ray Stewart | 269 (−15) | |
| 1998 | (United States) Mike Grob | 268 (−16) | |
| 1997 | (Canada) Mike Weir | 266 (−18) | |
| 1996 | (Namibia) Trevor Dodds | 274 (−10) | |
| 1995 | (United States) Scott Dunlap | 268 (−16) | |
| 1994 | (South Africa) Roger Wessels | 272 (−12) | |
