= Edmonton Open =

Tournament information
- Location: Alberta, Canada
- Established: 1993
- Tour: Canadian Tour
- Format: Stroke play
- Final year: 2009

Tournament record score
- Aggregate: 264 Aaron Barber (2001)
- To par: −21 Matt Daniel (2002)

Final champion
- (United States) James Hahn

The Edmonton Open was a golf tournament on the Canadian Tour that was held in Edmonton, Alberta, Canada. It was founded in 1993 as the Klondike Golf Klassic and was held during the week leading up to the Klondike Days summer fair. In 1996 Telus become the tournament's main sponsor and it was re-titled as the ED TEL PLAnet Open, before becoming the Telus Edmonton Open the following year.

The Edmonton Open came to an end after the 2009 edition when it was merged with the ATB Financial Classic, which was played in Edmonton in 2010 and 2012. Edmonton's PGA Tour Canada event since 2016 is the 1932byBateman Open (previously known as the Syncrude Oil Country Championship).

== Winners ==
Year	Venue	Winner	Score	Ref
Telus Edmonton Open
2009	Glendale	(United States) James Hahn	272 (−16) (Note: Hahn won with a par on the first hole of a sudden-death playoff.)	
2008	Windermere	(United States) John Ellis	266 (−18)	
2007	Edmonton	(Canada) Dustin Risdon	265 (−19)	
2006	Glendale	(United States) Stephen Gangluff	272 (−16) (Note: Gangluff won on the first hole of a sudden-death playoff.)	
2005	Edmonton	(Canada) Matt McQuillan	267 (−17)	
2004	Derrick	(United States) Steve Woodward	272 (−12) (Note: Woodward won on the second hole of a sudden-death playoff.)	
2003	Windermere	(United States) Rob Johnson	273 (−11)	
2002	Glendale	(Canada) Matt Daniel	267 (−21) (Note: Daniel won on the first hole of a sudden-death playoff.)	
2001	Edmonton	(United States) Aaron Barber	264 (−20)	
2000	Derrick	(New Zealand) Paul Devenport	270 (−14)	
1999	Mayfair	(Canada) Ray Stewart	267 (−17)	
1998	Glendale	(United States) Brian Kontak	208 (−8) (Note: Tournament reduced to 54 holes due to rain; Kontak won on the first hole of a sudden-death playoff.)	
1997	Windermere	(South Africa) Manny Zerman	274 (−10) (Note: Zerman won on the second hole of a sudden-death playoff.)	
ED TEL PLAnet Open
1996	The Ranch	(Namibia) Trevor Dodds	265 (−15)	
Klondike Golf Klassic
1995	The Ranch	(United States) Ray Freeman	265 (−15)	
1994	The Ranch	(South Africa) Ian Hutchings	275 (−5) (Note: Hutchings won with a birdie on the fourth hole of a sudden-death playoff.)	
1993	The Ranch	(Australia) Tod Power	271 (−9) (Note: Power won with a par on the first hole of a sudden-death playoff.)	
