= Greater Vancouver Classic =

Tournament information
- Location: British Columbia, Canada
- Established: 1994
- Tour: Canadian Tour
- Format: Stroke play
- Final year: 2009

Tournament record score
- Aggregate: 264 Guy Hill (1996)
- To par: −20 Guy Hill (1996)

Final champion
- (United States) Eric Woods

The Greater Vancouver Classic was a golf tournament that was held in the Greater Vancouver area, in British Columbia, Canada. Founded as the BC TEL Pacific Open in 1994, it was a direct replacement for the cancelled British Columbia Open on the Canadian Tour. In 2000 it was re-titled as the Telus Vancouver Open.

For 2002, the tournament had agreed a new multi-year sponsorship deal with a lawn car company and was to have been titled the Perfectly Natural Classic, but they backed out resulting in a great deal of discussion over a new unsponsored name. Having considered Greater Vancouver Open and Vancouver Open, which risked confusion with the PGA Tour event, eventually it was changed to Greater Vancouver Classic, and from 2006 the Greater Vancouver Charity Classic. In 2009, the name changed again, this time to the City of Surrey Invitational; it was to be the final time the tournament was held.

== Winners ==
Year	Venue	Winner	Score	Ref
City of Surrey Invitational
2009	Hazelmere	(United States) Mike Grob	272 (−16)	
Greater Vancouver Charity Classic
2008	Hazelmere	(Canada) Adam Speirs	275 (−13)	
2007	Hazelmere	(Canada) James Lepp	274 (−14)	
2006	Hazelmere	(United States) Lee Williamson	280 (−8)	
Greater Vancouver Classic
2005	Hazelmere	Tournament cancelled		
2004	Mayfair	(United States) Ryan Miller	270 (−14)	
2003	Swan-e-set Bay	(Canada) James Lepp (a)	269 (−19)	
2002	Swan-e-set Bay	(Malaysia) Iain Steel	272 (−16) (Note: Steel won after a playoff.)	
Telus Vancouver Open
2001	Point Grey	(United States) Stuart Scott	276 (−12) (Note: Scott won after a playoff.)	
2000	Mayfair Lakes	(Canada) Rob McMillan	271 (−13)	
BC TEL Pacific Open
1999	Mayfair Lakes	(United States) Ken Staton	269 (−15)	
1998	Mayfair Lakes	(South Africa) Ian Hutchings	271 (−13)	
1997	Mayfair Lakes	(Canada) Mike Weir	271 (−13)	
1996	Mayfair Lakes	(United States) Guy Hill	264 (−20)	
1995	Mayfair Lakes	(United States) Nicky Goetze	270 (−14) (Note: Goetze won after a playoff.)	
1994	Mayfair Lakes	(Australia) Craig Jones	268 (−16)	
