= Alberta Open =

Golf tournament

Tournament information
- Location: Alberta, Canada
- Established: 1935
- Course: Wolf Creek Golf Resort
- Tour: Canadian Tour (until 1999)
- Format: Stroke play
- Month played: June

Current champion
- (Canada) Wes Heffernan

The Alberta Open is a golf tournament that is held in Alberta, Canada. It was an important event on the Canadian Tour and its predecessors until 1999 when it endured a brief hiatus after losing its main sponsors. It returned as an event on the provincial circuit in 2002.

== History ==
Although tournament organisers, Alberta Golf, state that the Alberta Open was first played in 1935, the origins of the tournament can be traced back further, with an open championship being introduced to the Alberta Golf Association provincial tournament week in around 1912.

Originally a one-day 36-hole event played during the provincial tournament week alongside the amateur championship, the Alberta Open became a separate 72-hole tournament in 1937. In response to not attracting as many big-name players as hoped, in 1953 prize money was substantially reduced and the tournament was cut to 54-holes. As the Canadian Tour established itself in the late 1980s, the Alberta Open was again extended to 72-holes in 1988. Following its revival in 2002, it has been contested over both 36 and 54 holes.

== Winners ==
Year	Venue	Winner	Score	Ref
Alberta Open Championship
2024	Desert Blume	(Canada) Wes Heffernan (7)	201 (−15)	
2023	Coal Creek	(Canada) Max Sekulic	201 (−15)	
SVR Alberta Open
2022	Sundre	(Canada) Ethan Choi (am)	135 (−9)	
2021	Wolf Creek	(Canada) Riley Fleming (3)	201 (−12)	
2020	Wolf Creek	(Canada) A. J. Armstrong	206 (−7)	
2019	Trestle Creek	(Canada) Andrew Harrison (am)	202 (−14)	
2018	River Spirit	(Canada) Wes Heffernan (6)	203 (−13)	
2017	Sundre	(Canada) Dustin Risdon	139 (−5)	
Alberta Open
2016	RedTail Landing	(Canada) Brett Hogan	134 (−10)	
2015	Carnmoney	(Canada) James Love	135 (−7)	
2014	Wolf Creek	(Canada) Riley Fleming (2)	204 (−9)	
2013	RedTail Landing	(Canada) Riley Fleming	138 (−6)	
2012	Carnmoney	(Canada) Wes Heffernan (5)	210 (−3)	
RBC Insurance Alberta Open
2011	Carnmoney	(Canada) Wes Heffernan (4)	207 (−6) (Note: Heffernan won after a sudden-death playoff.)	
2010	Carnmoney	(Canada) Jamie Kureluk	131 (−11) (Note: Final round abandoned due to rain and snow.)	
Alberta Open presented by Fidelity Investments
2009	Carnmoney	(Canada) Ryan Yip	203 (−13)	
Wolverton Alberta Open
2008	Carnmoney	(Canada) Wes Heffernan (3)	140 (−4)	
Alberta Open
2007	Carnmoney	(Canada) Wes Heffernan (2)	130 (−14)	
2006	Carnmoney	(Canada) Wes Heffernan	134 (−10)	
2005	RedTail Landing	(Canada) Kris Wasylowich (am)	137 (−7)	
2004	RedTail Landing	(Canada) Brandon Markiw (am)	138 (−6)	
2003	RedTail Landing	(United States) Stuart Hendley	141 (−3) (Note: Hendley won after a sudden-death playoff.)	
2000–2002	No tournament			
Henry Singer Alberta Open
1999	Wolf Creek	(United States) Brian Kontak (2)	266 (−18)	
1998	Wolf Creek	(United States) Brian Kontak	260 (−20)	
1997	Wolf Creek	(United States) Ray Freeman	204 (−6) (Note: Final round cancelled due to bad weather; Freeman won with a birdie on the fourth hole of a sudden-death playoff.)	
1996	Wolf Creek	(Namibia) Trevor Dodds	270 (−10)	
1995	Wolf Creek	(South Africa) Ian Hutchings	268 (−12)	
Alberta Open
1994	Wolf Creek	(Canada) Jim Rutledge	271 (−9)	
Allianz Alberta Open
1993	Wolf Creek	(Australia) Don Fardon	273 (−7)	
Canadian Home Assurance Alberta Open
1992	Wolf Creek	(Australia) Richard Backwell	276 (−4) (Note: Backwell won with a par on the first hole of a sudden-death playoff.)	
1991	Wolf Creek	(Canada) Rick Todd	276 (−4)	
Phoenix Sportswear Alberta Open
1990	Wolf Creek	(Canada) Bruce Bulina	274 (−6) (Note: Bulina won with a birdie on the second hole of a sudden-death playoff.)	
1989	Wolf Creek	(Canada) Frank Edmonds	269 (−11)	
Alberta Open
1988	Wolf Creek	(United States) Kirk Triplett	279 (−1) (Note: Triplett won with a birdie on the second hole of a sudden-death playoff.)	
1987	Wolf Creek	(Australia) Ian Roberts	206 (−4)	
1986	Mayfair	(Canada) Randy Hill (am)	212 (+2)	
1985	Pinebrook	(Canada) Drew Hartt (am)	208 (−5)	
1984	Highlands	(Canada) Kelly Murray	213 (E)	
1983	Elks Club	(Canada) Norman Gray (am)	213 (E) (Note: Gray won after a sudden-death playoff.)	
1982	Derrick	(Canada) Wayne Bygrave (Canada) Richard Senetchko (am)	68 (tie) (Note: Cancelled after one round due to rain leaving the course unplayable.)	
1981	Elks Club	(Canada) Sandy Harper	141 (−1) (Note: Tournament reduced to 36-holes due to rain.)	
1980	Windermere	(Canada) Keith Alexander (2) (am)	213 (E)	
1979	Connaught	Tournament cancelled (Note: Tournament cancelled due to lack of entries.)		
1978	Windermere	(Canada) Gar Hamilton	209 (−4)	
1977	Willow Park	(Canada) Dave Barr	204 (−9)	
1976	Red Deer	(Canada) Moe Norman (3)	212 (−4) (Note: Norman won with a par on the first hole of a sudden-death playoff.)	
1975	Earl Grey	(Canada) Bob Panasiuk (2)	209 (−4)	
1974	Derrick	(Canada) Bob Panasiuk	206 (−7)	
1973	Silver Springs	(Canada) Al Balding	214 (−2)	
1972	Highlands	(United States) Greg Pitzer	204 (−9)	
1971	Calgary	(Canada) Moe Norman (2)	201 (−9)	
1970	Mayfair	(Canada) Stan Homenuik	205 (−5)	
1969	Earl Grey	(Canada) Bobby Cox	210 (−3)	
1968	Edmonton	(Canada) Wayne Vollmer	213 (E) (Note: Vollmer won with a birdie on the second hole of a sudden-death playoff.)	
1967	Glendale	(Canada) Keith Alexander (am)	207 (−9)	
1966	Canyon Meadows	(Canada) Moe Norman	214 (+1) (Note: Norman won with a par on the first hole of a sudden-death playoff.)	
1965	Highlands	(Canada) Wilf Homenuik (2)	211 (−2)	
1964	Red Deer	(Canada) Doug Silverberg (am)	203 (−13)	
1963		No tournament (Note: Tournament not held due to the Canadian Open being held in Edmonton.)		
1962	Calgary	(Canada) Bill Thomson	210 (E)	
1961	Windermere	(Canada) Wilf Homenuik	211 (−2)	
1960	Earl Grey	(Canada) Bob Wylie (2) (am)	208 (−2)	
1959	Edmonton	(Canada) Buddy Loftus (3)	213 (E) (Note: Loftus won with a birdie on the first hole of a sudden-death playoff.)	
1958	Earl Grey	Tournament cancelled (Note: Tournament cancelled due to dates conflicting with the Manitoba Open.)		
1957	Highlands	(Canada) Pete Olynyk	212 (−1) (Note: Olynyk won with a birdie on the second hole of a sudden-death playoff; all four players parred the first extra hole.)	
1956	Calgary	(Canada) Bob Wylie	217 (+7)	
1955	Mayfair	(Canada) Stan Leonard (9)	210 (E)	
1954	Earl Grey	(Canada) Frank Willey (2)	208 (−2)	
1953	Edmonton	(Canada) Frank Willey	205 (−8)	
1952	Calgary	(Canada) Henry Martell (4)	283 (+3)	
1951	Highlands	(Canada) Buddy Loftus (2)	281 (−7)	
1950	Earl Grey	(Canada) Stan Leonard (8)	276 (−4)	
1949	Mayfair	(Canada) Stan Leonard (7)	269 (−11)	
1948	Calgary	(Canada) Buddy Loftus (am)	285 (+5)	
1947	Edmonton	(Canada) Stan Leonard (6)	277 (−7)	
1946	Calgary	(Canada) Bill Tait (am)	288 (+8) (Note: Tait won following an 18-hole playoff; Bill Tait 68, Pat Fletcher 71, Duane Barr 73.)	
1945	Highlands	(Canada) Henry Martell (3) (am)	287 (−1)	
1944	Calgary	(Canada) Henry Martell (2) (am)	268 (−12) (Note: Martell won by a margin of 23 strokes.)	
1943	Calgary	(Canada) Stan Leonard (5)	293 (+13)	
1942	Mayfair	(Canada) Stan Leonard (4)	279 (−1)	
1941	Edmonton	(Canada) Stan Leonard (3)	272 (−12)	
1940	Calgary	(Canada) Fred Wood (2)	274 (−6)	
1939	Mayfair	(Canada) Stan Leonard (2)	286 (+6)	
1938	Calgary	(Canada) Fred Wood	276 (−4)	
1937	Edmonton	(Canada) Stan Leonard	291 (+7)	
1936	Mayfair	(Canada) Henry Martell (am)	148 (+4) (Note: Martell won following an 18-hole playoff; Henry Martell 76, Bob Proctor 79.)	
1935	Calgary	(Canada) Stewart Vickers (am)	141	
1934	Edmonton	(Canada) Joe Pryke (2)	140 (−2)	
1933	Calgary	(Canada) Lionel Morrison (am)	143	
1932	Mayfair	(Canada) Joe Pryke	140	
1931	Calgary	(Canada) Ronnie MacWilliams (2)	144	
1930	Edmonton	(Canada) Jimmy Rimmer (2)	149	
1929	Calgary	(Canada) Ronnie MacWilliams	149	
1928 (Note: Also served as the Western Canada Open.)	Mayfair	(Canada) Tom McGrath	150	
1927	Calgary	(Canada) Tommy Morrison	153 (Note: Morrison won following an 18-hole playoff; Tommy Morrison 76, Jim Hutcheson (am) 81.)	
1926	Edmonton	(Canada) Jimmy Rimmer	150	
1925	Calgary	(Canada) Jack Cuthbert (am)	152	
1924	Mayfair	(Canada) Art Cruttenden (2)	150	
1923	Calgary	(Canada) Carson MacWilliams (am)	150 (Note: MacWilliams won following an 18-hole playoff; Carson MacWilliams (am) ??, Art Cruttenden ??.)	
1922	Edmonton	(Canada) Duncan Sutherland	156	
1921	Calgary St Andrews	(Canada) Tom Watson	142	
1920	Calgary	(Canada) Bobby Mair	157 (Note: Mair won following an 18-hole playoff; Bobby Mair 80, J. Munro Hunter (am) 83.)	
1919	Edmonton	(Canada) Art Cruttenden	155	
1915–1918	No tournament due to World War I			
1914	Calgary St Andrews	(Canada) Thomas Gillespie	157	
1913	Edmonton	(Canada) Jack Walton	167	
1912	Calgary	(Canada) W. Barrett	159	
