= Victoria Open =

The Victoria Open is a golf tournament on the PGA Tour Americas. It was previously a stop on the PGA Tour Canada before its merger with the PGA Tour Latinoamérica. It was the longest running tour event on the Canadian Tour. It has been played at several different courses in the Victoria, British Columbia area, and at the Uplands Golf Club in Oak Bay since 2008.

Originally played as the Victoria Open in 1981, the tournament was revived in 1984 as a stop on the PGA Tour's satellite Tournament Players Series. That series ended after the 1985 season, and the Victoria Open then became a fixture on the Canadian Tour, where it had many different sponsored titles.

== Tournament hosts ==
Years	Course
Glen Meadows Golf Club	1981
Uplands Golf Club	1984, 1989, 1995, 1999, 2002, 2005, 2008–2024
Royal Colwood Golf Club	1985, 1992, 1996, 2000, 2003, 2006
Gorge Vale Golf Club	1986–1988, 1990, 1993, 1997, 2001, 2004, 2007
Cowichan Golf Club	1991
Cordova Bay Golf Club	1994, 1998

== Winners ==
Times Colonist Victoria Open

- 2025 (Canada) Drew Nesbitt

Beachlands Victoria Open

- 2024 (Denmark) Frederik Kjettrup

Royal Beach Victoria Open

- 2023 (Canada) Étienne Papineau
- 2022 (United States) Scott Stevens

Reliance Properties DCBank Open

- 2021 (Canada) Blair Bursey

Bayview Place DCBank Open presented by Times Colonist

- 2019 (France) Paul Barjon
- 2018 (United States) Sam Fidone

Bayview Place Cardtronics Open presented by Times Colonist

- 2017 (Germany) Max Rottluff

Bayview Place Island Savings Open presented by Times Colonist

- 2016 (Canada) Adam Cornelson
- 2015 (Canada) Albin Choi
- 2014 (United States) Josh Persons

Times Colonist Island Savings Open

- 2013 (United States) Stephen Gangluff
- 2012 (United States) Andrew Roque
- 2011 (Mexico) José de Jesús Rodríguez

Times Colonist Open

- 2010 (United States) Brock Mackenzie
- 2009 (United States) Byron Smith
- 2008 (United States) Daniel Im
- 2007 (United States) Spencer Levin
- 2006 (United States) Mike Grob
- 2005 (Canada) Craig Taylor
- 2004 (Canada) David Hearn

Victoria Open

- 2003 (United States) Patrick Damron
- 2002 (Australia) Scott Hend

Shell Payless Open

- 2001 (New Zealand) Paul Devenport
- 2000 (United States) Jason Bohn
- 1999 (United States) Ken Duke

Payless Open

- 1998 (United States) Jay Hobby
- 1997 (Canada) Rick Todd
- 1996 (Canada) Arden Knoll
- 1995 (Canada) Norm Jarvis
- 1994 (United States) Matt Jackson
- 1993 (United States) Brandt Jobe
- 1992 (United States) Mike Colandro

Payless–Pepsi Open

- 1991 (Canada) Rick Todd
- 1990 (United States) Steve Stricker

Payless–Pepsi Victoria Open

- 1989 (United States) Kelly Gibson

Payless Victoria Open

- 1988 (United States) Todd Erwin

Payless Canadian Tournament Players Championship

- 1987 (Australia) Craig Parry
- 1986 (Canada) Bob Panasik

Victoria Open IEC Classic

- 1985 (United States) Jeff Sanders

PEZ Victoria Open

- 1984 (United States) Charlie Bolling

Victoria Open

- 1982–83 No tournament
- 1981 (Canada) Dave Barr
