= PGA Tour Canada =

Professional golf tour

- Formerly: Canadian Tour; Mackenzie Tour-PGA Tour Canada
- Sport: Golf
- Founded: 1985
- First season: 1986
- Folded: 2023
- President: Scott Pritchard
- Country: Based in Canada (Note: Schedules also included events in Colombia, Costa Rica, Mexico and the United States.)
- Most titles: Order of Merit titles: (Canada) Dave Barr (2) (Namibia) Trevor Dodds (2) (United States) Eric Woods (2); Tournament wins: (Namibia) Trevor Dodds (6) (United States) Mike Grob (6)
- Related competitions: PGA Tour Americas; PGA Tour China; PGA Tour Latinoamérica
- Website: pgatourcanada.com

PGA Tour Canada, commonly referred to as the Canadian Tour, was a men's professional golf tour headquartered in Toronto, Ontario. The United States–based PGA Tour took over operation of the tour on November 1, 2012, at which time it was renamed PGA Tour Canada. In 2015, Mackenzie Investments became the umbrella sponsor of the tour, branding it as the Mackenzie Tour-PGA Tour Canada.

PGA Tour Canada used to be one of three international PGA Tour-sanctioned tours, along with PGA Tour Latinoamérica and PGA Tour China (all now defunct). These tours provided access to the Korn Ferry Tour and are part of the path to the PGA Tour.

In April 2023, the PGA Tour announced that the 2023 PGA Tour Canada season would be the last, as from 2024 the tour would merge with PGA Tour Latinoamérica, creating PGA Tour Americas.

== History ==
The origins of the Canadian Tour can be traced back to the Carling of Canada Golf Tour, which ran for four years from 1966 to 1969. In 1970 Carling Brewery reduced their sponsorship commitments to just a handful of the main tournaments and the tour became less coordinated. Later in the year Imperial Tobacco Canada, under the Peter Jackson brand, signed on as title sponsor and brought scattered Canadian professional events back under one umbrella. The Peter Jackson Tour started in 1971 bringing together seven provincial opens, with each purse reaching C$15–20,000 by 1977. The Tour developed predominantly Canadian touring pros but also welcomed players from around the world. Canadian Golf Hall of Fame members Dave Barr and Dan Halldorson – both two-time PGA Tour winners – competed on the circuit in the 1970s and made several appearances once they were established on the big tour. Fellow Canadians and PGA Tour winners Al Balding and George Knudson also returned home several times in their career to play the circuit.

As the 1970s continued, government legislation began restricting the amount of advertising and sponsorship that tobacco companies were allowed to participate in. In 1978, anticipating future legislation that would ban tobacco advertising and sponsorship in Canada, Imperial Tobacco withdrew its title sponsorship of the circuit. Several tournaments disappeared and although a few carried on, there was no longer any cohesion to the circuit. In 1982, Canadian touring professionals formed the Tournament Players Division (TPD) within the Canadian Professional Golfers Association (CPGA) and proposed a reorganized circuit under the guidance of Ken Tarling.

In 1985, TPD members selected Bob Beauchemin as president with the mandate to "build, promote and conduct tournaments of the Canadian Tour to develop Canadian professional golfers to a world-class level." The reborn Canadian Professional Golf Tour began play in 1985 and had six events. Nevertheless, the Tour was still linked with the CPGA (PGA of Canada). In January 1986, Beauchemin convinced the CPGA's Board of Directors to grant the TPD autonomous status within the CPGA and to be responsible for its own funding.

The next step involved organizing tournaments in such a way as to maximize the benefit for the players. At the time, most tournaments were 36- or 54-hole events and several were pro-am formats. To prepare players for the PGA Tour, they set a goal for all tournaments to be 72 holes with no pro-ams during the actual competition. Prize money, exemptions and draws would need to mimic the format used on the PGA Tour and European Tour. Although it took until 1989 for all tournaments to play 72 holes, the Canadian Tour began attracting players from not only the United States, but from around the world in the mid-1980s.

The Canadian Tour has sent many players on to PGA Tour success. Canadian Mike Weir, the winner of eight PGA Tour titles – including the 2003 Masters - earned Rookie of the Year honours on the Canadian Tour in 1993. In 1997, Weir captured the 1997 Canadian Masters and BC Tel Pacific Open as well as the Order of Merit. He first qualified for the PGA Tour in 1998. Other PGA Tour winners who played the Canadian Tour include 2005 U.S. Open winner Michael Campbell, 2004 Open Championship winner Todd Hamilton, Steve Stricker, Stuart Appleby, Peter Lonard, Scott McCarron, Tim Herron, Chris DiMarco, Nick Watney, Stephen Ames, Paul Casey, Arron Oberholser, D. A. Points, Ken Duke, Mackenzie Hughes, and 2008 RBC Canadian Open winner Chez Reavie.

The former Canadian Tour became an associate member of what was at the time the trade body of the world's main men's tours, the International Federation of PGA Tours, in 2000. In 2009, it became a full member when the Federation expanded to include all of the main women's tours. It is one of a number of lower-level tours at which Official World Golf Ranking points are available, with a minimum of six given to the winner and points to the top six plus ties.

The Canadian Open, which is the richest golf event in Canada, is a PGA Tour event. The top three from the PGA Tour Canada Order of Merit the week before the Canadian Open are given entry. The prize money does not count toward Order of Merit earnings.

PGA Tour Canada offices are at Golf House in Oakville, Ontario, on the grounds of the Glen Abbey Golf Course. The Jack Nicklaus-designed course has hosted more than 20 Canadian Opens since 1977.

In 2011, the Canadian Tour made history when Isabelle Beisiegel became the first woman to earn a Tour card on a men's professional golf tour.

In October 2012, the PGA Tour acquired the Canadian Tour, renaming it PGA Tour Canada effective November 1, 2012, for first use in the 2013 season. Under the new system, the top five players on the PGA Tour Canada Order of Merit earn Web.com Tour cards, with the money leader fully exempt and those 2nd-5th conditionally exempt. Players ranked 2nd through 10th are exempt through to the finals of qualifying school and those who finish 11th–20th are admitted to the second stage. The re-tooled tour offered at least eight tournaments per season, with total purses of about $150,000 apiece. For 2015, the purses were increased to $175,000 for the first eleven events. Those who finish in the Top 60 earn entry into season-ending Freedom 55 Financial Championship, with a $200,000 purse and are guaranteed at minimum full PGA Tour Canada status for the next season. In 2018, the purses were increased to $200,000 and $225,000 respectively.

Like many smaller tours, PGA Tour Canada has its own series of qualifying schools at various sites. The medalist at each of the six sites is fully exempt for the season. Those in the top 14 (not including ties) are exempt through the first six events, when a reshuffle occurs. In the event of a tie, a playoff determines the final exempt position. Those in the top 40 including ties are conditionally exempt.

In 2015, Mackenzie Investments became the tour's umbrella sponsor. For the next six years, the tour was named Mackenzie Tour-PGA Tour Canada. Through various PGA Tour Canada's initiatives, over $4.1 million has been raised for charities throughout Canada since 2013.

In 2020, PGA Tour Canada originally planned an expansion into border states with the United States. On January 16, 2020, officials announced a six-year deal with the Cragun's Golf Resort in Brainerd, Minnesota for the Cuyuna Regional Medical Center Championship. In March, the tour was cancelled due to the COVID-19 pandemic, and replaced by two series – the LocaliQ Series in the United States, an eight-tournament series from August to November, and the Canada Life Series for Canadian-based players, a four-tournament series from August and September to provide Canadian-based players some playing opportunities. In response to travel restrictions, the LocaliQ Series became the Forme Tour in 2021 to allow non-Canadian members to earn Korn Ferry Tour privileges.

In 2022, PGA Tour Canada rebranded the Order of Merit as the Fortinet Cup, which was modelled after the FedEx Cup points system used by the main PGA Tour, and was sponsored by network security company Fortinet.

== Order of Merit winners ==
Year	Winner	Points
2023	(United States) Hayden Springer	1,311
2022	(Canada) Wil Bateman	1,654
2021	(Canada) Callum Davison	1,244
Year	Winner	Prize money (C$)
2020	Canceled due to the COVID-19 pandemic	
2019	(France) Paul Barjon	127,336
2018	(United States) Tyler McCumber	139,300
2017	(United States) Kramer Hickok	122,502
2016	(United States) Dan McCarthy	157,843
2015	(United States) J. J. Spaun	91,193
2014	(United States) Joel Dahmen	80,992
2013	(Canada) Mackenzie Hughes	52,114
2012	(Canada) Matt Hill	48,273
2011	(Mexico) José de Jesús Rodríguez	80,228
2010	(United States) Aaron Goldberg	156,119
2009	(Canada) Graham DeLaet	94,579
2008	(United States) John Ellis	113,315
2007	(United States) Byron Smith	91,202
2006	(United States) Stephen Gangluff	67,336
2005	(United States) Michael Harris	95,622
2004	(United States) Erik Compton	85,876
2003	(Canada) Jon Mills	55,321
2002	(United States) Hank Kuehne	105,959
2001	(United States) Aaron Barber	75,337
2000	(New Zealand) Steven Alker	93,617
1999	(United States) Ken Duke	122,188
1998	(United States) Brian Kontak	84,878
1997	(Canada) Mike Weir	80,696
1996	(Namibia) Trevor Dodds (2)	129,158
1995	(Namibia) Trevor Dodds	78,468
1994	(United States) Eric Woods (2)	44,083
1993	(United States) Eric Woods	44,325
1992	(United States) Chris DiMarco	57,148
1991	(United States) Guy Boros	64,025
1990	(United States) Brandt Jobe	40,844
1989	(Canada) Jerry Anderson	63,655
1988	(Canada) Dave Barr (2)	94,750
1987	(United States) Jim Benepe	37,832
1986	(Canada) Dave Barr	54,525

== Records ==
- Lowest winning total score – 256 (−28) Brian Unk, 2009 Seaforth Country Classic, Seaforth Golf Club, Seaforth, Ontario.
- Lowest 18-hole score – 58 (−13) Jason Bohn, 2001 Bayer Championship, Huron Oaks Golf Club, Sarnia, Ontario.
- Lowest 36-hole score – 123 (−19) Zach Wright, 2018 Lethbridge Paradise Canyon Open, Lethbridge, Alberta.
- Longest playoff – 11 holes Lee Chill defeated Chris DiMarco in the 1992 Willows Classic.
- Largest playoff – 6 players (Steve Scott defeated Roger Tambellini, Jess Daley, Steven Alker, Mark Slawter, and Scott Hend). Scott won on 6th playoff hole.
- Largest winning margin – 11 strokes Arron Oberholser in the 1999 Ontario Open Heritage Classic.
