= List of African golfers =

This is a list of golfers from Africa.

Members of the World Golf Hall of Fame are annotated HoF.

Player	Country	Born	Died	Ref.
Warren Abery	South Africa	1973		
Thomas Aiken	South Africa	1983		
Fulton Allem	South Africa	1957		
Hugh Baiocchi	South Africa	1946		
John Bland	South Africa	1945	2023	
Desvonde Botes	South Africa	1974		
Michiel Bothma	South Africa	1973		
Sid Brews	South Africa	1899	1972	
Tienie Britz	South Africa	1945		
Hendrik Buhrmann	South Africa	1963		
Marc Cayeux	Zimbabwe	1978		
Tongoona Charamba	Zimbabwe	1982		
J. G. Claassen	South Africa	1991		
Tim Clark	South Africa	1975		
George Coetzee	South Africa	1986		
Bobby Cole	South Africa	1948		
Louis de Jager	South Africa	1987		
Brendon de Jonge	Zimbabwe	1980		
Trevor Dodds	Namibia	1959		
Ernie Els HoF	South Africa	1969		
Darren Fichardt	South Africa	1975		
Trevor Fisher Jnr	South Africa	1979		
John Fourie	South Africa	1939		
David Frost	South Africa	1959		
Retief Goosen	South Africa	1969		
Branden Grace	South Africa	1988		
Vaughn Groenewald	South Africa	1974		
Anton Haig	South Africa	1986		
Hassan Hassanein	Egypt	1916	1957	
Jeff Hawkes	South Africa	1953		
Dale Hayes	South Africa	1952		
Allan Henning	South Africa	1944		
Harold Henning	South Africa	1934	2004	
Justin Hobday	South Africa	1963		
Simon Hobday	South Africa	1940		
Keith Horne	South Africa	1971		
Jean Hugo	South Africa	1975		
Ian Hutchings	Zimbabwe	1968		
Denis Hutchinson	Zimbabwe	1932		
Trevor Immelman	South Africa	1979		
Derek James	South Africa	1960		
Tony Johnstone	Zimbabwe	1956		
James Kamte	South Africa	1982		
Nasho Kamungeremu	Zimbabwe	c. 1973	2007	
Richard Kaplan	South Africa	1962		
Peter Karmis	South Africa	1981		
James Kingston	South Africa	1965		
Jbe' Kruger	South Africa	1986		
Werner Lassen	Namibia	1974		
James Lebbie	Sierra Leone	c. 1958		
Cobie Legrange	South Africa	1942		
Gavan Levenson	South Africa	1953		
Brett Liddle	South Africa	1970		
Bobby Lincoln	South Africa	1953		
Sally Little	South Africa; United States	1951		
Bobby Locke HoF	South Africa	1917	1987	
John Mashego	South Africa	1951		
Doug McGuigan	South Africa; Scotland	1970		
Andrew McLardy	South Africa	1974		
Mark McNulty	Zimbabwe; Ireland	1953		
Titch Moore	South Africa	1976		
Garth Mulroy	South Africa	1978		
Madalitso Muthiya	Zambia	1983		
Louis Oosthuizen	South Africa	1982		
Hennie Otto	South Africa	1976		
Lee-Anne Pace	South Africa	1981		
Ian Palmer	South Africa	1957		
Brenden Pappas	South Africa	1970		
Deane Pappas	South Africa	1967		
Sean Pappas	South Africa	1966	2015	
Brandon Pieters	South Africa	1976		
Gary Player HoF	South Africa	1935		
Nick Price HoF	Zimbabwe	1957		
Ashley Roestoff	South Africa	1963		
Rory Sabbatini	South Africa; Slovakia	1976		
Charl Schwartzel	South Africa	1984		
Sewsunker Sewgolum	South Africa	1930	1978	
Kelli Shean	South Africa	1987		
Ashleigh Simon	South Africa	1989		
Theunis Spangenberg	South Africa	1983		
Richard Sterne	South Africa	1981		
Des Terblanche	South Africa	1965		
Vincent Tshabalala	South Africa	1942	2017	
Tyrone van Aswegen	South Africa	1982		
Ulrich van den Berg	South Africa	1975		
Tjaart van der Walt	South Africa	1974		
Nico van Rensburg	South Africa	1966		
Steve van Vuuren	South Africa	1959		
Jaco van Zyl	South Africa	1979		
Bradford Vaughan	South Africa	1975		
Bobby Verwey	South Africa	1941		
Justin Walters	South Africa	1980		
Denis Watson	Zimbabwe	1955		
Roger Wessels	South Africa	1961		
Wayne Westner	South Africa	1961	2017	
Clinton Whitelaw	South Africa	1970		
Chris Williams	South Africa	1959		
