= Sean Pappas =

South African golfer

Personal information
- Full name: Sean Critton Pappas
- Nationality: South Africa; Greece
- Born: 19 February 1966 Phalaborwa, South Africa
- Died: 7 June 2015 (aged 49)
- Height: 1.90 m (6 ft 3 in)

Career
- Sport: Golf
- College: University of Arkansas
- Turned professional: 1990
- Former tours: Sunshine Tour; T. C. Jordan Tour
- Professional wins: 7

Number of wins by tour
- Sunshine Tour: 4
- Other: 3

Sean Critton Pappas (19 February 1966 – 7 June 2015) was a professional golfer from South Africa.

== Early life ==
Pappas was born in Phalaborwa, South Africa. He is the second oldest of four brothers Craigen (born 1959), Deane (born 1967), and Brenden (born 1970). He attended the University of Arkansas from 1984 to 1987, with Deane and Brenden following him there. Deane and Brenden are both professional golfers who have won on the Nationwide Tour and played on the PGA Tour. Sean turned professional in 1990 and stayed in South Africa playing on the Sunshine Tour and teaching.

As a result of the sporting boycott of South Africa during the apartheid era, the Pappas brothers represented Greece in the European Amateur Team Championship and the Eisenhower Trophy in the 1980s.

== Professional career ==
Pappas turned professional in January 1990 and played a few events on the Nationwide Tour in 1991 and 1992. He also shot a 59 in the first round of the Hartland Classic, a T. C. Jordan Tour event in Bowling Green, Kentucky. He did not find much success in his early professional years and moved back to South Africa for the 1993 season. He first joined the Sunshine Tour in the 1993 season. He would win five times on the Sunshine Tour between 1993, when he won his first title, and the 2000 season.

Pappas has earned over R768,000 in his career between 1993 and his most recent season 2002. He has played over 230 events in South Africa and finished in the top-10 over 30 times winning 1/3 of his playoffs.

Pappas had a double-eagle in December 1999 at the Vodacom Players Championship on the 3rd hole at the Royal Cape Golf Club during the 3rd round. He played briefly again in the United States from 1994-95 finding limited success, with two mini-tour wins on the NGA Hooters Tour in 1994. He then moved back to his residence in Phalaborwa. His most recent full season on the Sunshine Tour was in 2002.

In 2010, Sean Pappas became the resident Club Professional at The Ranch Resort Executive Golf Course and Academy – officially opened on 22 May by the Premier of Limpopo Province, Cassel Mathale. 24.5 km south of Polokwane.

== Personal life ==
Pappas died in June 2015 of a heart attack.

== Professional wins (7) ==
=== Southern Africa Tour wins (4) ===
No.	Date	Tournament	Winning score	Margin of victory	Runner(s)-up
1	21 Feb 1993	Hollard Royal Swazi Sun Classic	−16 (71-64-69-68=272)	Playoff	(South Africa) Ernie Els
2	15 Nov 1996	Lombard Tyres Classic	−12 (68-68-68=204)	2 strokes	(South Africa) James Kingston, (South Africa) Ashley Roestoff, (South Africa) Roger Wessels
3	12 Apr 1997	Kalahari Classic	−7 (67-73-69=209)	1 stroke	(South Africa) Justin Hobday, (South Africa) Andrew McLardy, (South Africa) Tjaart van der Walt
4	1 Oct 2000	Bearing Man Highveld Classic	−16 (68-67-65=200)	1 stroke	(South Africa) Bobby Lincoln

Southern Africa Tour playoff record (1–1)

No.	Year	Tournament	Opponent(s)	Result
1	1993	Hollard Royal Swazi Sun Classic	(South Africa) Ernie Els	Won with par on first extra hole
2	1995	Amatola Sun Classic	(South Africa) Richard Kaplan, (South Africa) Bobby Lincoln	

=== T. C. Jordan Tour wins (2) ===
No.	Date	Tournament	Winning score	Margin of victory	Runner-up
1	21 Jul 1991	Hartland Classic	−32 (59-61-64-68=252)	6 strokes	(United States) Steve Ford
2	28 Jul 1991	Jefferson Landing Classic	−16 (66-64-70=200)	4 strokes	(United States) Jeff Barlow

=== Other wins (1) ===
- 1994 Highveld Classic

== Team appearances ==
Amateur

- Eisenhower Trophy (representing Greece): 1984, 1986, 1988
- European Amateur Team Championship (representing Greece): 1985
