= 1999–2000 Southern Africa Tour =

Golf tour season

1999–2000 Southern Africa Tour season
- Duration: 14 April 1999 – 6 February 2000
- Number of official events: 17
- Most wins: (South Africa) Bobby Lincoln (2) (South Africa) Hennie Otto (2)
- Order of Merit: (South Africa) Darren Fichardt
- Rookie of the Year: (South Africa) Jean Hugo

The 1999–2000 Southern Africa Tour, titled as the 1999–2000 Vodacom Tour for sponsorship reasons, was the 29th season of the Southern Africa Tour, the main professional golf tour in South Africa since it was formed in 1971.

It was the third season of the tour under a title sponsorship agreement with Vodacom, that was announced in June 1997.

== Schedule ==
The following table lists official events during the 1999–2000 season.

Date	Tournament	Location	Purse (R)	Winner (Note: The number in brackets after each winner's name is the number of Southern Africa Tour events they had won up to and including that tournament. This information is only shown for Southern Africa Tour members.)	OWGR points	Other tours (Note: EUR − European Tour.)	Notes
17 Apr	Lombard Tyres Classic	Gauteng	125,000	(South Africa) Brett Liddle (4)	n/a		
23 Apr	Vodacom Series (Gauteng)	Gauteng	200,000	(South Africa) Nico van Rensburg (1)	n/a		
8 May	Pietersburg Classic	Limpopo	100,000	(South Africa) Hennie Otto (1)	n/a		
15 May	Vodacom Series (Eastern Cape)	Eastern Cape	200,000	(South Africa) Ashley Roestoff (6)	n/a		
12 Jun	Vodacom Series (KwaZulu-Natal)	KwaZulu-Natal	200,000	(South Africa) Hennie Otto (2)	n/a		
14 Aug	Vodacom Series (Mpumalanga)	Mpumalanga	200,000	(South Africa) André Cruse (1)	n/a		
12 Sep	Bearing Man Highveld Classic	Mpumalanga	100,000	(South Africa) Bobby Lincoln (5)	n/a		
25 Sep	Vodacom Series (Free State)	Free State	200,000	(South Africa) Desvonde Botes (7)	n/a		
30 Sep	Royal Swazi Sun Classic	Swaziland	200,000	(South Africa) Bradford Vaughan (2)	n/a		
10 Oct	Vodacom Series (Western Cape)	Western Cape	200,000	(South Africa) Sean Ludgater (1)	n/a		
31 Oct	Platinum Classic	North West	200,000	(South Africa) Bobby Lincoln (6)	n/a		
28 Nov	Zimbabwe Open	Zimbabwe	475,000	(South Africa) Jean Hugo (1)	12		
12 Dec	Vodacom Players Championship	Western Cape	2,000,000	(South Africa) Nic Henning (1)	20		
16 Jan	Alfred Dunhill Championship	Mpumalanga	£500,000	(England) Anthony Wall (n/a)	12	EUR	New tournament
23 Jan	Mercedes-Benz South African Open	Gauteng	US$1,000,000	(Sweden) Mathias Grönberg (n/a)	32	EUR	Flagship event
30 Jan	Dimension Data Pro-Am	North West	2,000,000	(England) Lee Westwood (n/a)	22		Pro-Am
6 Feb	Stenham Swazi Open	Swaziland	1,000,000	(Zimbabwe) Mark McNulty (29)	12		

=== Unofficial events ===
The following events were sanctioned by the Southern Africa Tour, but did not carry official money, nor were wins official.

Date	Tournament	Location	Purse (R)	Winner	OWGR points	Notes
22 Jul	Wild Coast Sun Pro-Am	Eastern Cape	75,000	(South Africa) James Kingston	n/a	
17 Aug	PGA's Cup	Gauteng	80,000	(South Africa) Darren Fichardt (South Africa) Paul McErlean	n/a	Title shared
27 Aug	Royal Swazi Sun Pro-Am	Swaziland	75,000	(South Africa) Justin Hobday	n/a	
5 Dec	Nedbank Million Dollar Challenge	North West	US$2,500,000	(South Africa) Ernie Els	40	Limited-field event

== Order of Merit ==
The Order of Merit was based on prize money won during the season, calculated in South African rand.

Position	Player	Prize money (R)
1	(South Africa) Darren Fichardt	558,735
2	(South Africa) Nic Henning	525,388
3	(South Africa) Tjaart van der Walt	443,705
4	(South Africa) David Frost	347,527
5	(South Africa) Ashley Roestoff	330,590

== Awards ==
Award	Winner	Ref.
Rookie of the Year (Bobby Locke Trophy)	(South Africa) Jean Hugo	
