= Zimbabwe Open =

Golf tournament

FBC Zim Open
Tournament information
- Location: Harare, Zimbabwe
- Established: 1979
- Courses: Royal Harare Golf Club; Chapman Golf Club
- Par: 72
- Length: 7,241 yards (6,621 m) (RH); 7,198 yards (6,582 m) (C)
- Tours: Sunshine Tour; Challenge Tour; Safari Circuit
- Format: Stroke play
- Prize fund: R 3,000,000
- Month played: May

Tournament record score
- Aggregate: 266 Nick Price (1995)
- To par: −22 as above

Current champion
- (South Africa) Altin van der Merwe

Location map
- Location in Zimbabwe

The Zimbabwe Open is a professional golf tournament held in Zimbabwe, currently played on the Sunshine Tour.

== History ==
The tournament debuted in 1984 and was part of the Safari circuit from 1985 to 1992, a series of events in Africa played by professionals from the European Tour during the winter season. In 1991 and 1992, the event was also part of the Challenge Tour. From 1993, it moved onto the First National Bank Tour, later renamed the Sunshine Tour.

When it was held in the weeks preceding the Nedbank Golf Challenge, the tournament attracted some of the world's leading players who used it as a warm up to the big money invitational. Past winners include major winners Vijay Singh and Nick Price with Mark McNulty also achieving three victories, making him one of the most successful players in the event. Past winner Gordon J. Brand represented the Ryder Cup.

Due to economic instability in Zimbabwe, the tournament lost sponsors and was cancelled prior to the 2002 event. There were many attempts to resurrect the tournament, but none were successful until 2010. The 2019 edition was also cancelled because of a lack of sponsors caused by a weak economy.

Having not been played in 2019, 2020 and 2021, the tournament returned in 2022, sponsored by FBC Bank. It had been anticipated that the event would be added to the 2023 European Tour schedule. However, this never came to fruition, mainly due to changes in the venue qualifying criteria set by the European Tour. It was anticipated that the tournament would become a European Tour event in 2024 instead. Again, this never came to fruition.

== Winners ==
Year	Tour (Note: AFR − Sunshine Tour; CHA − Challenge Tour; SAF − Safari Circuit.)	Winner	Score	To par	Margin of victory	Runner(s)-up	Venue	Ref.
FBC Zim Open
2026	AFR	(South Africa) Altin van der Merwe	267	−21	4 strokes	(Australia) Austin Bautista	Royal Harare	
2025	AFR	(Mexico) Luis Carrera	270	−18	4 strokes	(Australia) Austin Bautista	Royal Harare	
2024	AFR	(South Africa) Michael Hollick	268	−20	2 strokes	(South Africa) Darren Fichardt	Royal Harare	
2023	AFR	(South Africa) Neil Schietekat	277	−11	4 strokes	(South Africa) Jaco Ahlers (South Africa) Jacques P. de Villiers (Greece) Peter Karmis	Royal Harare	
2022	AFR	(South Africa) Albert Venter	278	−10	Playoff	(South Africa) Louis Albertse (South Africa) Stefan Wears-Taylor	Royal Harare	
Zimbabwe Open
2021: No tournament
2020	AFR	No tournament due to the COVID-19 pandemic						
2019	AFR	Cancelled due to lack of funding						
Old Mutual Zimbabwe Open
2018	AFR	(South Africa) Bryce Easton	272	−16	1 stroke	(South Africa) Daniel van Tonder	Royal Harare	
Zimbabwe Open
2017	AFR	(South Africa) J. C. Ritchie	272	−16	Playoff	(South Africa) Trevor Fisher Jnr	Royal Harare	
Golden Pilsener Zimbabwe Open
2016	AFR	(South Africa) Lyle Rowe	277	−11	2 strokes	(South Africa) Dylan Frittelli	Royal Harare	
2015	AFR	(South Africa) Dean Burmester	272	−16	1 stroke	(Brazil) Adilson da Silva	Royal Harare	
2014	AFR	(South Africa) Jbe' Kruger (2)	270	−18	1 stroke	(South Africa) Jacques Blaauw	Royal Harare	
2013	AFR	(South Africa) Jake Roos	274	−14	1 stroke	(South Africa) Darren Fichardt (Italy) Francesco Laporta	Royal Harare	
2012	AFR	(South Africa) Chris Swanepoel	273	−15	Playoff	(South Africa) Trevor Fisher Jnr	Royal Harare	
Africom Zimbabwe Open
2011	AFR	(South Africa) Theunis Spangenberg	201 (Note: Shortened to 54 holes due to weather.)	−15	2 strokes	(South Africa) Matthew Carvell	Royal Harare	
2010	AFR	(South Africa) Jbe' Kruger	269	−19	2 strokes	(South Africa) Jaco van Zyl	Royal Harare	
2002–2009: No tournament
CABS/Old Mutual Zimbabwe Open
2001	AFR	(South Africa) Darren Fichardt	275	−13	3 strokes	(South Africa) Mark Murless (South Africa) Bradford Vaughan	Chapman	
2000	AFR	(Zimbabwe) Mark McNulty (3)	269	−19	1 stroke	(South Africa) Jean Hugo	Royal Harare	
Zimbabwe Open
1999	AFR	(South Africa) Jean Hugo	271	−17	2 strokes	(South Africa) Ulrich van den Berg	Chapman	
1998	AFR	(Zimbabwe) Nick Price (3)	271	−17	5 strokes	(South Africa) Tjaart van der Walt	Royal Harare	
1997	AFR	(Zimbabwe) Nick Price (2)	269	−19	2 strokes	(Zimbabwe) Mark McNulty (South Africa) Brenden Pappas	Chapman	
1996	AFR	(Zimbabwe) Mark McNulty (2)	270	−18	4 strokes	(South Africa) Justin Hobday (Zimbabwe) Nick Price	Chapman	
1995	AFR	(Zimbabwe) Nick Price	266	−22	1 stroke	(South Africa) Brenden Pappas	Royal Harare	
1994	AFR	(South Africa) Chris Williams	272	−16	Playoff	(United States) Andrew Pitts	Royal Harare	
1993	AFR	(Zimbabwe) Tony Johnstone	273	−15	8 strokes	(South Africa) Nic Henning (South Africa) James Kingston	Chapman	
1992	CHA	(Zimbabwe) Mark McNulty	272	−16	9 strokes	(Zimbabwe) Tony Johnstone	Royal Harare	
1991	CHA	(England) Keith Waters	282	−6	Playoff	(Zimbabwe) Nick Price (England) Grant Turner	Chapman	
1990	SAF	(England) Grant Turner	281	−7	1 stroke	(England) Lee Jones	Chapman	
1989	SAF	(Fiji) Vijay Singh	282	−6	2 strokes	(Wales) Mark Mouland	Chapman	
1988	SAF	(England) Roger Chapman	275 (Note: Two holes were unplayable on day one.)	−6	1 stroke	(Fiji) Vijay Singh	Chapman	
1987	SAF	(England) Gordon J. Brand	277	−11	Playoff	(England) Andrew Murray	Royal Harare	
1986	SAF	(England) Stephen Bennett	277	−11	2 strokes	(New Zealand) Stuart Reese	Royal Harare	
1985	SAF	(England) Malcolm MacKenzie	281	−7	3 strokes	(Wales) David Llewellyn	Chapman	
1984		(Zimbabwe) Anderson Rusike (a)					Royal Harare	
1981–1983: No tournament
1980	AFR	(South Africa) Hugh Baiocchi	279	−9	Playoff	(South Africa) Allan Henning (Zimbabwe) Denis Watson	Bulawayo	
Zimbabwe-Rhodesia Open
1979	AFR	(South Africa) Simon Hobday	275	−13	Playoff	(Zimbabwe Rhodesia) Denis Watson	Chapman	

== See also ==
- Open golf tournament
