= 1994–95 Southern Africa Tour =

Golf tour season

1994–95 Southern Africa Tour season
- Duration: 17 November 1994 – 19 February 1995
- Number of official events: 9
- Most wins: (South Africa) Ernie Els (2)
- Order of Merit: (South Africa) Ernie Els

The 1994–95 Southern Africa Tour, titled as the 1994–95 FNB Tour for sponsorship reasons, was the 24th season of the Southern Africa Tour, the main professional golf tour in South Africa since it was formed in 1971.

It was the third season of the tour under a title sponsorship agreement with First National Bank, that began in 1992.

== Changes for 1994–95 ==
For the first time, the European Tour ventured into Southern Africa, co-sanctioning their first event with the Southern Africa Tour; the Lexington South African PGA Championship.

== Season outline ==
South African star Ernie Els had a chance to win several events at the beginning of the season. At the second event, the Nashua Wild Coast Sun Challenge, Els was in contention but bogeyed the 70th hole and followed it up with a double bogey. South Africa's Hendrik Buhrmann secured the title. The following week, at the unofficial Nedbank Million Dollar Challenge, Els again had a chance to win; he was one behind leader Nick Faldo early on the back nine. However, similar to the previous week, Els struggled on Sunday's back nine, recording a double-bogey on the 13th and a bogey on the next to end his chances. He finished five behind champion Faldo. Els, however, would go on to win the following event, Bell's Cup.

In the middle of the season, a number of little known American golfers had success. At the fourth tournament of the year, the FNB Players Championship, American Ron Whittaker was the champion by six strokes. The following week was the ICL International; South African Ashley Roestoff was the champion. American Michael Christie finished runner-up. The sixth tournament was the Hollard Royal Swazi Sun Classic. American Brad Ott birdied five of the last eight holes to "squeeze" by and defeat South Africa's Richard Kaplan and England's Chris Davison by a shot. In early February, at the Telkom South African Masters, American Scott Dunlap defeated Zimbabwe's Mark McNulty at the first sudden death playoff hole.

Late in the season, however, it was again Els who dominated. At the penultimate event, the Phillips South African Open, he recorded a solo runner-up placing, finishing only behind Retief Goosen. At the final tournament, the Lexington PGA Championship, Els started the final round two shots behind but birdied four of the first seven holes to take the lead. He ultimately won by two. According to the Daily Post, the victory went towards "confirming his status as the best young golfer in the world." Els won the Order of Merit easily.

== Schedule ==
The following table lists official events during the 1994–95 season.

Date	Tournament	Location	Purse (R)	Winner (Note: The number in brackets after each winner's name is the number of Southern Africa Tour events they had won up to and including that tournament. This information is only shown for Southern Africa Tour members.)	OWGR points	Other tours (Note: EUR − European Tour.)	Notes
20 Nov	Zimbabwe Open	Zimbabwe	350,000	(South Africa) Chris Williams (3)	14		
27 Nov	Nashua Wild Coast Sun Challenge	Western Cape	750,000	(South Africa) Hendrik Buhrmann (1)	20		New tournament
8 Jan	Bell's Cup	Western Cape	600,000	(South Africa) Ernie Els (7)	22		
15 Jan	FNB Players Championship	KwaZulu-Natal	700,000	(United States) Ron Whittaker (1)	18		
22 Jan	ICL International	Gauteng	550,000	(South Africa) Ashley Roestoff (1)	16		
29 Jan	Hollard Royal Swazi Sun Classic	Swaziland	450,000	(United States) Brad Ott (1)	12		
5 Feb	Telkom South African Masters	North West	700,000	(United States) Scott Dunlap (1)	16		
12 Feb	Phillips South African Open	Gauteng	650,000	(South Africa) Retief Goosen (3)	22		
19 Feb	Lexington South African PGA Championship	Gauteng	£250,000	(South Africa) Ernie Els (8)	30	EUR	

=== Unofficial events ===
The following events were sanctioned by the Southern Africa Tour, but did not carry official money, nor were wins official.

Date	Tournament	Location	Purse (R)	Winner	OWGR points	Notes
4 Dec	Nedbank Million Dollar Challenge	North West	US$2,500,000	(England) Nick Faldo	52	Limited-field event

== Order of Merit ==
The Order of Merit was based on prize money won during the season, calculated in South African rand.

Position	Player	Prize money (R)
1	(South Africa) Ernie Els	460,488
2	(Zimbabwe) Mark McNulty	258,149
3	(South Africa) Hendrik Buhrmann	215,335
4	(South Africa) Roger Wessels	213,254
5	(South Africa) Retief Goosen	166,863
