= Clinton Whitelaw =

South African professional golfer (born 1970)

Personal information
- Full name: Clinton John Whitelaw
- Nationality: South Africa
- Born: 24 December 1970 (age 55) Johannesburg, South Africa
- Height: 1.93 m (6 ft 4 in)

Career
- Sport: Golf
- Turned professional: 1990
- Former tours: Sunshine Tour; European Tour; Canadian Tour
- Professional wins: 5

Number of wins by tour
- European Tour: 1
- Sunshine Tour: 3
- Other: 1

Clinton John Whitelaw (born 24 December 1970) is a South African professional golfer.

== Career ==
Whitelaw was born in Johannesburg. In 1990, he turned professional. Whitelaw has competed predominantly on the Southern Africa-based Sunshine Tour since then, where he has won three tournaments, including the 1993 Philips South African Open. He also played on the Canadian Tour during his early career.

Whitelaw played on the European Tour the late 1990s, having won his card at the qualifying school at the end of 1996. He won the 1997 Moroccan Open, and went on to finish 54th on the Order of Merit that season. However he was unable to repeat that performance in the following seasons due to a recurring lumbar spine injury.

In 2000, Whitelaw effectively retired from tournament golf, playing only a few events on the Sunshine Tour each year through 2011. He is now an instructor and works as a head teaching professional in Sarasota, Florida.

== Amateur wins ==
- Transvaal Strokeplay Championship
- Northern Transvaal Strokeplay Championship
- Western Transvaal Strokeplay Championship
- Transvaal Under 23 Strokeplay Championships

== Professional wins (5) ==
=== European Tour wins (1) ===
| No. | Date | Tournament | Winning score | Margin of victory | Runners-up |
|---|---|---|---|---|---|
| 1 | 9 Mar 1997 | Moroccan Open | −11 (68-71-69-69=277) | 2 strokes | (England) Roger Chapman, (Australia) Darren Cole, (Australia) Wayne Riley |

=== Sunshine Tour wins (3) ===
| No. | Date | Tournament | Winning score | Margin of victory | Runner(s)-up |
|---|---|---|---|---|---|
| 1 | 14 Feb 1993 | Philips South African Open | −9 (68-71-68-72=279) | 2 strokes | (South Africa) Retief Goosen |
| 2 | 5 Oct 1996 | FNB Pro Series (Western Cape) | −7 (73-68-68=209) | 2 strokes | (South Africa) Alex Baillie, (England) Chris Davison, (South Africa) Ashley Roestoff, (South Africa) Kevin Stone, (South Africa) Des Terblanche |
| 3 | 12 Oct 1996 | FNB Pro Series (2) (Free State) | −16 (66-67-67=200) | 5 strokes | (South Africa) Chris Williams |

=== Other wins (1) ===
- 1993 California State Open
