= Highveld Classic =

Golf tournament

Tournament information
- Location: Witbank, Mpumalanga, South Africa
- Established: 1979
- Course: Witbank Golf Club
- Par: 72
- Length: 6,772 yards (6,192 m)
- Tour: Sunshine Tour
- Format: Stroke play
- Prize fund: R 600,000
- Month played: October
- Final year: 2009

Tournament record score
- Aggregate: 196 Titch Moore (2002); 196 James Kamte (2008)
- To par: −20 as above

Final champion
- (South Africa) Lindani Ndwandwe

Location map
- Location in South Africa Location in Mpumalanga

The Highveld Classic was a golf tournament on the Southern Africa based Sunshine Tour. It was held annually at Witbank Golf Club in Witbank on the highveld of Mpumalanga, South Africa from 1979 to 2009.

== Winners ==
Year	Winner	Score	To par	Margin of victory	Runner(s)-up
Highveld Classic
2009	(South Africa) Lindani Ndwandwe	197	−19	Playoff	(South Africa) Alex Haindl
Metmar Highveld Classic
2008	(South Africa) James Kamte	196	−20	5 strokes	(South Africa) Desvonde Botes (Scotland) Doug McGuigan (South Africa) Brandon Pieters
Bearing Man Highveld Classic
2007	(Zimbabwe) Marc Cayeux	202	−14	3 strokes	(South Africa) Ulrich van den Berg
2006	(South Africa) Darren Fichardt (2)	204	−12	Playoff	(South Africa) Alex Haindl
2005	(South Africa) Bradford Vaughan	201	−15	2 strokes	(South Africa) Thomas Aiken (South Africa) Peter Karmis
2004	(South Africa) Divan van den Heever	198	−18	5 strokes	(South Africa) Leonard Loxton
2003	(South Africa) Dion Fourie	201	−15	1 stroke	(South Africa) Desvonde Botes (South Africa) Divan van den Heever
2002	(South Africa) Titch Moore	196	−20	5 strokes	(South Africa) Ashley Roestoff
2001	(South Africa) Justin Hobday	203	−13	Playoff	(Zimbabwe) Marc Cayeux
2000	(South Africa) Sean Pappas (2)	200	−16	1 stroke	(South Africa) Bobby Lincoln
1999	(South Africa) Bobby Lincoln	209	−7	Playoff	(South Africa) Darren Fichardt (Zimbabwe) Lyall McNeill
1998	(South Africa) Wayne Bradley	202	−14	2 strokes	(South Africa) Sammy Daniels
1997	(South Africa) Darren Fichardt	200	−16	1 stroke	(South Africa) Sean Pappas
1996	(South Africa) Des Terblanche (2)	200	−16	1 stroke	(South Africa) Bobby Lincoln
1995	(South Africa) Russell Fletcher	204	−12	1 stroke	(South Africa) Brenden Pappas
Highveld Classic
1994	(South Africa) Sean Pappas	206	−10		
1993	(South Africa) Des Terblanche	198	−18		
1992	(South Africa) Retief Goosen	199	−17	1 stroke	(South Africa) Ashley Roestoff
1991	(South Africa) Robbie Stewart				
1990: No information known
1989	(South Africa) Nico van Rensburg				
1979–1988: No information known
