= 1996–97 Southern Africa Tour =

Golf tour season

1996–97 Southern Africa Tour season
- Duration: 11 April 1996 – 2 March 1997
- Number of official events: 25
- Most wins: (Zimbabwe) Mark McNulty (3)
- Order of Merit: (Zimbabwe) Nick Price

The 1996–97 Southern Africa Tour, titled as the 1996–97 FNB Tour for sponsorship reasons, was the 26th season of the Southern Africa Tour, the main professional golf tour in South Africa since it was formed in 1971.

It was the fifth season of the tour under a title sponsorship agreement with First National Bank, that began in 1992.

== Changes for 1996–97 ==
The South African Open became co-sanctioned with the European Tour for the first time, benefitting from an increased purse and world ranking points.

== Schedule ==
The following table lists official events during the 1996–97 season.

Date	Tournament	Location	Purse (R)	Winner (Note: The number in brackets after each winner's name is the number of Southern Africa Tour events they had won up to and including that tournament. This information is only shown for Southern Africa Tour members.)	OWGR points	Other tours (Note: EUR − European Tour.)	Notes
13 Apr	Kalahari Classic	Northern Cape	70,000	(South Africa) Brett Liddle (3)	n/a		
21 Apr	Newcastle Classic	KwaZulu-Natal	60,000	(United States) John Nelson (1)	n/a		
18 May	FNB Pro Series (Eastern Cape)	Eastern Cape	100,000	(South Africa) Ian Hutchings (1)	n/a		
6 Jun	FNB Pro Series (Swaziland)	Swaziland	100,000	(South Africa) Chris Williams (4)	n/a		
6 Jul	Bosveld Classic	Limpopo	70,000	(South Africa) James Kingston (3)	n/a		
25 Aug	Platinum Classic	North West	100,000	(South Africa) Mark Murless (1)	n/a		
15 Sep	Bearing Man Highveld Classic	Mpumalanga	70,000	(South Africa) Des Terblanche (2)	n/a		
28 Sep	IDC Development Tourism Classic	Mpumalanga	100,000	(South Africa) Justin Hobday (3)	n/a		
5 Oct	FNB Pro Series (Western Cape)	Western Cape	100,000	(South Africa) Clinton Whitelaw (2)	n/a		
12 Oct	FNB Pro Series (Free State)	Free State	100,000	(South Africa) Clinton Whitelaw (3)	n/a		
19 Oct	FNB Pro Series (Botswana)	Botswana	100,000	(South Africa) Des Terblanche (3)	n/a		
27 Oct	FNB Pro Series (Namibia)	Namibia	100,000	(South Africa) Kevin Stone (2)	n/a		
1 Nov	Trustbank Gauteng Classic	Gauteng	100,000	(South Africa) Ashley Roestoff (3)	n/a		New tournament
10 Nov	Mycom Mafunyane Trophy	Limpopo	200,000	(South Africa) Roger Wessels (3)	n/a		
15 Nov	Lombard Tyres Classic	Gauteng	100,000	(South Africa) Sean Pappas (2)	n/a		
30 Nov	Leopard Rock Classic	Zimbabwe	100,000	(South Africa) Chris Williams (4)	n/a		New tournament
8 Dec	Zimbabwe Open	Zimbabwe	400,000	(Zimbabwe) Mark McNulty (25)	16		
15 Dec	Zambia Open	Zambia	150,000	(South Africa) Desvonde Botes (1)	n/a		New to Southern Africa Tour
19 Jan	San Lameer South African Masters	KwaZulu-Natal	750,000	(Zimbabwe) Mark McNulty (26)	14		
26 Jan	Nashua Wild Coast Sun Challenge	Western Cape	750,000	(Zimbabwe) Mark McNulty (27)	14		
2 Feb	FNB Players Championship	KwaZulu-Natal	750,000	(South Africa) Warren Schutte (1)	16		
9 Feb	South African Open	Gauteng	£500,000	(Fiji) Vijay Singh (n/a)	34	EUR	
16 Feb	Dimension Data Pro-Am	Gauteng	£400,000	(Zimbabwe) Nick Price (8)	26	EUR	Pro-Am
23 Feb	Alfred Dunhill South African PGA Championship	Gauteng	£300,000	(Zimbabwe) Nick Price (9)	24	EUR	
2 Mar	Hollard Royal Swazi Sun Open	Swaziland	500,000	(South Africa) Warrick Druian (1)	12		

=== Unofficial events ===
The following events were sanctioned by the Southern Africa Tour, but did not carry official money, nor were wins official.

Date	Tournament	Location	Purse (R)	Winner	OWGR points	Notes
1 Dec	Nedbank Million Dollar Challenge	North West	US$2,500,000	(Scotland) Colin Montgomerie	44	Limited-field event

== Order of Merit ==
The Order of Merit was based on prize money won during the season, calculated in South African rand.

Position	Player	Prize money (R)
1	(Zimbabwe) Nick Price	1,223,027
2	(Zimbabwe) Mark McNulty	619,427
3	(South Africa) Retief Goosen	301,304
4	(South Africa) Nico van Rensburg	269,289
5	(South Africa) Wayne Westner	255,811
