= Desvonde Botes =

South African professional golfer

Personal information
- Full name: Desvonde Pierre Botes
- Nickname: Boats
- Nationality: South Africa
- Born: 2 November 1974 (age 51) Pretoria, South Africa
- Height: 1.91 m (6 ft 3 in)
- Spouse: Cisna (m. 2003)
- Children: 2

Career
- Sport: Golf
- Turned professional: 1992
- Current tours: Asian Tour; Sunshine Tour
- Professional wins: 14

Number of wins by tour
- Sunshine Tour: 12
- Other: 2

Best results in major championships
- Masters Tournament: DNP
- PGA Championship: DNP
- U.S. Open: DNP
- The Open Championship: T64: 2000

Desvonde Pierre Botes (born 2 November 1974) is a South African professional golfer.

== Early life ==
Botes was born in Pretoria. After winning the South African Amateur Championship in 1991 at the age of 16 years and 5 months, 20 days younger than the record set by Ernie Els,

== Professional career ==
In 1992, Botes turned professional. His first professional victory came in the Mercedes Benz Golf Challenge on the Southern Africa Tour in 1993.

Following further successes on the Southern Africa Tour, including the South African Masters in 1998, Botes attempted to qualify for the European Tour. He did not manage to gain full exemption in 1999, but returned the following year and was medalist at the European Tour Qualifying School less than a week after claiming his second Platinum Classic title in South Africa. He finished just outside the top 100 in the Order of Merit, with a best finish of 5th in the Benson & Hedges International Open.

Back problems in 2002 and 2003, meant Botes was unable to retain his place on the European Tour. He returned to South Africa and won the Parmalat Classic on his way to 3rd place on the Sunshine Tour Order of Merit. That promising form prompted another attempt at the European Tour Qualifying School. He claimed the last card for the 2004 season, but made only five cuts in the regular tour events, with a best finish of 9th, and failed to retain his playing privileges for the following season. Since then he has competed on the Sunshine Tour with limited success, although he has won several titles on the less competitive Winter Swing of the schedule.

== Professional wins (14) ==
=== Sunshine Tour wins (12) ===
| No. | Date | Tournament | Winning score | Margin of victory | Runner(s)-up |
|---|---|---|---|---|---|
| 1 | 15 Dec 1996 | Zambia Open | −8 (68-70-70=208) | 1 stroke | (South Africa) Neil Homann |
| 2 | 5 Jul 1997 | Bosveld Classic | −11 (66-72-67=205) | 3 strokes | (South Africa) Darren Fichardt |
| 3 | 18 Oct 1997 | Vodacom Series (Western Cape) | −13 (69-66-68=203) | Playoff | (South Africa) Dean van Staden |
| 4 | 17 Jan 1998 | Platinum Classic | −17 (68-64-67=199) | 3 strokes | (South Africa) Richard Kaplan, (South Africa) Hennie Walters |
| 5 | 2 May 1998 | Pietersburg Classic | −19 (62-67-68=197) | 5 strokes | (South Africa) Sammy Daniels |
| 6 | 14 Feb 1999 | South African Masters | −19 (65-68-72-64=269) | 1 stroke | (South Africa) Dean van Staden |
| 7 | 25 Sep 1999 | Vodacom Series (2) (Free State) | −10 (68-67-71=206) | 1 stroke | (South Africa) Titch Moore |
| 8 | 12 Nov 2000 | Platinum Classic (2) | −14 (66-66-70=202) | 1 stroke | (South Africa) Roger Wessels |
| 9 | 27 Jun 2003 | Parmalat Classic | −9 (68-69-70=207) | 2 strokes | (South Africa) James Kingston |
| 10 | 13 May 2005 | Vodacom Origins of Golf at Pretoria | −14 (66-65-71=202) | Playoff | (South Africa) Jean Hugo |
| 11 | 27 May 2005 | Vodacom Origins of Golf (2) at Pezula | −18 (66-67-65=198) | 6 strokes | (South Africa) Ian Hutchings |
| 12 | 30 Sep 2006 | Seekers Travel Pro-Am | −20 (67-62-67=196) | 3 strokes | (South Africa) Alex Haindl |

Sunshine Tour playoff record (2–0)

| No. | Year | Tournament | Opponent | Result |
|---|---|---|---|---|
| 1 | 1997 | Vodacom Series (Western Cape) | (South Africa) Dean van Staden | Won with birdie on first extra hole |
| 2 | 2005 | Vodacom Origins of Golf at Pretoria | (South Africa) Jean Hugo | Won with birdie on first extra hole |

=== IGT Pro Tour wins (1) ===
| No. | Date | Tournament | Winning score | Margin of victory | Runner-up |
|---|---|---|---|---|---|
| 1 | 26 Jan 2012 | #1 IGT Summer Series | −18 (67-63-68=198) | 5 strokes | (South Africa) Jean Hugo |

=== Other wins (1) ===
- 1993 Mercedes Benz Golf Challenge

== Playoff record ==
Asian PGA Tour playoff record (0–1)

| No. | Year | Tournament | Opponent | Result |
|---|---|---|---|---|
| 1 | 1999 | Nokia Singapore Open | (Australia) Kenny Druce | Lost to par on second extra hole |

== Results in major championships ==
| Tournament | 2000 | 2001 | 2002 | 2003 | 2004 | 2005 | 2006 | 2007 |
|---|---|---|---|---|---|---|---|---|
| The Open Championship | T64 | | | | | | | CUT |

Note: Botes only played in The Open Championship.

Did not play

CUT = missed the half-way cut
"T" = tied

== Results in World Golf Championships ==
| Tournament | 2004 |
|---|---|
| Match Play | |
| Championship | T48 |
| Invitational | |

Did not play

"T" = Tied
