= 1997–98 Southern Africa Tour =

Golf tour season

1997–98 Southern Africa Tour season
- Duration: 10 April 1997 – 8 March 1998
- Number of official events: 24
- Most wins: (South Africa) Desvonde Botes (3)
- Order of Merit: (Zimbabwe) Mark McNulty
- Rookie of the Year: (South Africa) Richard Fulford

The 1997–98 Southern Africa Tour, titled as the 1997–98 Vodacom Tour for sponsorship reasons, was the 27th season of the Southern Africa Tour, the main professional golf tour in South Africa since it was formed in 1971.

== Vodacom title sponsorship ==
In June 1997, it was announced that the tour had signed a title sponsorship agreement with Vodacom, being renamed as the Vodacom Tour. The agreement was reported to be worth R 100,000,000 over five years.

== Schedule ==
The following table lists official events during the 1997–98 season.

Date	Tournament	Location	Purse (R)	Winner (Note: The number in brackets after each winner's name is the number of Southern Africa Tour events they had won up to and including that tournament. This information is only shown for Southern Africa Tour members.)	OWGR points	Other tours (Note: EUR − European Tour.)	Notes
12 Apr	Kalahari Classic	Northern Cape	75,000	(South Africa) Sean Pappas (3)	n/a		
27 Jun	Vodacom Series (Eastern Cape)	Eastern Cape	150,000	(South Africa) Des Terblanche (4)	n/a		New tournament series
5 Jul	Bosveld Classic	Limpopo	80,000	(South Africa) Desvonde Botes (2)	n/a		
12 Jul	Vodacom Series (Mpumalanga)	Mpumalanga	150,000	(South Africa) Robbie Stewart (1)	n/a		
26 Jul	Trustbank Gauteng Classic	Gauteng	120,000	(South Africa) Bradford Vaughan (1)	n/a		
9 Aug	Vodacom Series (Gauteng)	Gauteng	150,000	(United States) John Nelson (1)	n/a		
30 Aug	FNB Botswana Open	Botswana	150,000	(Zimbabwe) Nasho Kamungeremu (1)	n/a		New tournament
13 Sep	FNB Namibia Open	Namibia	150,000	(South Africa) Wallie Coetsee (1)	n/a		New tournament
21 Sep	Bearing Man Highveld Classic	Mpumalanga	75,000	(South Africa) Darren Fichardt (1)	n/a		
11 Oct	Vodacom Series (Free State)	Free State	150,000	(South Africa) Dean van Staden (1)	n/a		
18 Oct	Vodacom Series (Western Cape)	Western Cape	150,000	(South Africa) Desvonde Botes (3)	n/a		
25 Oct	Vodacom Series (KwaZulu-Natal)	KwaZulu-Natal	150,000	(South Africa) Grant Muller (1)	n/a		
1 Nov	Lombard Tyres Classic	Gauteng	120,000	(South Africa) Andrew McLardy (1)	n/a		
16 Nov	Leopard Rock Classic	Zimbabwe	100,000	(Brazil) Adilson da Silva (1)	n/a		
23 Nov	Zambia Open	Zambia	250,000	(Republic of Ireland) James Loughnane (1)	n/a		
30 Nov	Zimbabwe Open	Zimbabwe	400,000	(Zimbabwe) Nick Price (10)	20		
14 Dec	Mycom Mafunyane Trophy	Limpopo	200,000	(South Africa) Kevin Stone (3)	n/a		
17 Jan	Platinum Classic	North West	100,000	(South Africa) Desvonde Botes (4)	n/a		
1 Feb	Nashua Wild Coast Sun Challenge	Western Cape	500,000	(Brazil) Adilson da Silva (2)	14		
8 Feb	South African Open	KwaZulu-Natal	£450,000	(South Africa) Ernie Els (10)	30	EUR	
15 Feb	Alfred Dunhill South African PGA Championship	Gauteng	£400,000	(Zimbabwe) Tony Johnstone (17)	36	EUR	
22 Feb	Dimension Data Pro-Am	North West	1,900,000	(Zimbabwe) Nick Price (11)	18		Pro-Am
28 Feb	Stenham Royal Swazi Sun Open	Swaziland	500,000	(Eswatini) Paul Friedlander (2)	12		
8 Mar	Vodacom Players Championship	Gauteng	1,000,000	(Zimbabwe) Mark McNulty (28)	14		

=== Unofficial events ===
The following events were sanctioned by the Southern Africa Tour, but did not carry official money, nor were wins official.

Date	Tournament	Location	Purse (R)	Winner	OWGR points	Notes
7 Dec	Nedbank Million Dollar Challenge	North West	US$2,500,000	(Zimbabwe) Nick Price	44	Limited-field event

== Order of Merit ==
The Order of Merit was based on prize money won during the season, calculated in South African rand.

Position	Player	Prize money (R)
1	(Zimbabwe) Mark McNulty	589,053
2	(Zimbabwe) Tony Johnstone	553,327
3	(United States) Scott Dunlap	368,378
4	(South Africa) Marco Gortana	289,062
5	(South Africa) Nic Henning	277,552

== Awards ==
Award	Winner	Ref.
Rookie of the Year (Bobby Locke Trophy)	(South Africa) Richard Fulford	
