= Paul Friedlander (golfer) =

Emaswati professional golfer

Personal information
- Nationality: Eswatini
- Born: c.1970

Career
- Sport: Golf
- College: Oral Roberts University
- Status: Professional
- Former tour: Sunshine Tour
- Professional wins: 3

Number of wins by tour
- Asian Tour: 1
- Sunshine Tour: 2

Paul Friedlander (born 28 September 1970) is a professional golfer from Eswatini.

== Early life ==
Friedlander was born in Johannesburg, South Africa. He is from Swaziland. His mother, Helen (née de Beer), was an accomplished sportswoman, representing Northern Rhodesia in hockey.

Friedlander attended St. Marks Primary School and high school at Waterford Kamhlaba United World College of Southern Africa in Mbabane, Swaziland. Waterford was more than a school at the time. As the first multi-racial, non-denominational and co-educational school in the region, it was a political statement in the face of apartheid South Africa. In 1988, when Friedlander was a member of the school's Students Representative Council, he met King Charles (then the Prince of Wales) when Charles visited the school as Patron of the United World College movement.

A talented all-around sportsman, he was introduced to the game of golf by his father at a young age and grew up playing golf at the Royal Swazi Golf Club, the only 18-hole golf course that existed at the time and was Swaziland champion several times while still in his teens. There were no driving ranges then and he practiced on football fields that usually had cattle and goats grazing on them.

== Amateur career ==
Friedlander attended university at the University of Houston where he red-shirted as a freshman, and then at Oral Roberts University in the United States. Friedlander had a successful college career. In 1993, he played for Meadowbrook Country Club in Broken Arrow, Oklahoma. Friedlander transferred to Oral Roberts University as a college junior where he won six tournaments and was named to the 1994–95 NCAA Division 1 Academic All-American Team.

He had multiple wins including the 1992 Elkins Lake Fall Classic, the 1992 Boatmen's Bank Collegiate, the 1993 Hal Sutton Intercollegiate Classic, was a medalist at the 1993 Oklahoma State Amateur tournament, and won the 1994 UALR Intercollegiate.

== Professional career ==
In 1995, Friedlander turned professional. He played mainly on the South African and Asian golf tours with significant success. As a top 5 player in Swaziland, he was entitled to automatic membership of the South African Sunshine Tour but was denied his tour card because Swaziland had no official order of merit. He was forced to play in the Tour Qualifying Tournament at Crown Mines GC in Johannesburg, which he won.

He earned his Asian Tour playing rights at the Asian Tour Qualifying Tournament in Johor Bahru (Malaysia), while suffering from severe food poisoning. He shot a 10-under par 62 in the second round of the 1997 Tugu Pratama Indonesian PGA Championship which was the lowest round on the Asian Tour that year.

He won the 1995 IDC Development Classic in South Africa by 8 strokes. The following year, Friedlander finished runner-up to James Kingston at the Bushveld Classic. In 1996, he also won the Gadgil Western Dubai Creek Open an Asian Tour "major" which carried a five-year tour exemption. In 1998, Friedlander won the Stenham Royal Swazi Sun Open in a playoff with Scott Dunlap, an official event on the Sunshine Tour in his home country of Eswatini.

Friedlander was always interested in business and despite multiple wins in a short professional career spanning the ages of 25 to 28, he retired from professional golf after less than four years. He is now a businessman. As of 2015, he was the Swaki Group's chief executive and worked as an executive for Galito's Flame Grilled Chicken.

== Personal life ==
Friedlander is Jewish.

Friedlander met his future wife, Gemma (née Collyer) in Swaziland. She was a news presenter on Swazi T.V. They married in 2003 when she was 20 and they have five children together.

Friedlander is still an Eswatini citizen though lives in London.

== Awards and honors ==
In 2014, Friedlander was inducted into the South Africa Golf Hall of Fame.

== Professional wins (3) ==
=== Asian PGA Tour wins (1) ===
No.	Date	Tournament	Winning score	Margin of victory	Runners-up
1	19 Oct 1996	Dubai Creek Open	−8 (69-70-69-72=280)	4 strokes	(Myanmar) Kyi Hla Han, (South Africa) Craig Kamps

=== Southern Africa Tour wins (2) ===
No.	Date	Tournament	Winning score	Margin of victory	Runner-up
1	2 Sep 1995	IDC Development Classic	−11 (64-68-72-69=273)	8 strokes	(South Africa) Neale Gandy
2	28 Feb 1998	Stenham Royal Swazi Sun Open	−15 (65-69-67=201)	Playoff	(United States) Scott Dunlap

Southern Africa Tour playoff record (1–0)

No.	Year	Tournament	Opponent	Result
1	1998	Stenham Royal Swazi Sun Open	(United States) Scott Dunlap	Won with par on second extra hole
