= Vodacom Players Championship =

Tournament information
- Location: Cape Town, South Africa
- Established: 1992
- Course: Royal Cape Golf Club
- Par: 72
- Length: 6,219 yards (5,687 m)
- Tours: Sunshine Tour; European Tour
- Format: Stroke play
- Prize fund: R 1,000,000
- Month played: December
- Final year: 2002

Tournament record score
- Aggregate: 270 Ernie Els (1992); 270 Ron Whittaker (1995); 270 Wayne Westner (1996)
- To par: −18 as above

Final champion
- (Zimbabwe) Mark McNulty
- Location in South Africa Location in Western Cape

The Vodacom Players Championship was a golf tournament on the Sunshine Tour that was held in South Africa. It was founded as the FNB Players Championship in 1992 and was played for the final time in 2002. In 1996, it was also included on the schedule of the European Tour.

== Winners ==
Year	Tour(s) (Note: AFR − Sunshine Tour; EUR − European Tour.)	Winner	Score	To par	Margin of victory	Runner(s)-up	Venue
Vodacom Players Championship
2002	AFR	(Zimbabwe) Mark McNulty (3)	272	−16	3 strokes	(United States) Scott Dunlap	Royal Cape
2001	AFR	(South Africa) Ernie Els (2)	273	−15	1 stroke	(South Africa) Retief Goosen (South Africa) Martin Maritz (Scotland) Alan McLean (South Africa) Trevor Immelman	Royal Cape
2000	AFR	(South Africa) Trevor Immelman	279	−9	3 strokes	(South Africa) Ernie Els (South Africa) Titch Moore	Royal Cape
1999	AFR	(South Africa) Nic Henning	276	−12	Playoff	(Northern Ireland) Darren Clarke	Royal Cape
1999	AFR	(England) Chris Davison	275	−13	3 strokes	(South Africa) Nic Henning	Royal Durban
1998	AFR	(Zimbabwe) Mark McNulty (2)	275	−5	3 strokes	(South Africa) Warren Abery (United States) Scott Dunlap	Killarney
FNB Players Championship
1997	AFR	(South Africa) Warren Schutte	274	−14	2 strokes	(South Africa) Nico van Rensburg	Durban
1996	AFR, EUR	(South Africa) Wayne Westner	270	−18	1 stroke	(Argentina) José Cóceres	Durban
1995	AFR	(United States) Ron Whittaker	270	−18	6 strokes	(Zimbabwe) Tony Johnstone (Republic of Ireland) John McHenry	Durban
1994: No tournament
1993	AFR	(Zimbabwe) Mark McNulty	273	−15	5 strokes	(South Africa) Roger Wessels	Royal Johannesburg
1992	AFR	(South Africa) Ernie Els	270	−18	4 strokes	(Zimbabwe) Mark McNulty	Royal Johannesburg
