= 2000–01 Sunshine Tour =

Golf tour season

2000–01 Sunshine Tour season
- Duration: 16 March 2000 – 25 February 2001
- Number of official events: 22
- Most wins: (Zimbabwe) Mark McNulty (3)
- Order of Merit: (Zimbabwe) Mark McNulty
- Rookie of the Year: (South Africa) Trevor Immelman

The 2000–01 Sunshine Tour, titled as the 2000–01 Vodacom Tour for sponsorship reasons, was the 30th season of the Sunshine Tour (formerly the Southern Africa Tour), the main professional golf tour in South Africa since it was formed in 1971.

It was the fourth season of the tour under a title sponsorship agreement with Vodacom, that was announced in June 1997.

== Schedule ==
The following table lists official events during the 2000–01 season.

Date	Tournament	Location	Purse (R)	Winner (Note: The number in brackets after each winner's name is the number of Sunshine Tour events they had won up to and including that tournament. This information is only shown for Sunshine Tour members.)	OWGR points	Other tours (Note: EUR − European Tour.)	Notes
18 Mar	Cock of The North	Zambia	200,000	(South Africa) Titch Moore (1)	n/a		New to Sunshine Tour
26 Mar	Stanbic Zambia Open	Zambia	500,000	(Republic of Ireland) James Loughnane (2)	n/a		
1 Apr	FNB Botswana Open	Botswana	180,000	(South Africa) Richard Kaplan (4)	n/a		
14 Apr	Lombard Tyres Classic	Gauteng	125,000	(South Africa) Brett Liddle (5)	n/a		
7 May	Vodacom Series (Gauteng)	Gauteng	200,000	(South Africa) Nico van Rensburg (2)	n/a		
13 May	Pietersburg Classic	Limpopo	125,000	(Zimbabwe) Marc Cayeux (3)	n/a		
28 May	Vodacom Series (Eastern Cape)	Eastern Cape	200,000	(South Africa) Ryan Reid (1)	n/a		
17 Sep	Emfuleni Classic	Gauteng	200,000	(South Africa) Des Terblanche (5)	n/a		New tournament
1 Oct	Bearing Man Highveld Classic	Mpumalanga	200,000	(South Africa) Sean Pappas (4)	n/a		
15 Oct	Observatory Classic	Western Cape	200,000	(South Africa) Roger Wessels (4)	n/a		New tournament
29 Oct	Western Cape Classic	Western Cape	200,000	(South Africa) Jean Hugo (2)	n/a		
12 Nov	Platinum Classic	North West	400,000	(South Africa) Desvonde Botes (8)	n/a		
17 Nov	Riviera Resort Classic	Gauteng	200,000	(South Africa) Ulrich van den Berg (1)	n/a		New tournament
26 Nov	CABS/Old Mutual Zimbabwe Open	Zimbabwe	700,000	(Zimbabwe) Mark McNulty (30)	12		
10 Dec	Vodacom Players Championship	Western Cape	2,000,000	(South Africa) Trevor Immelman (1)	26		
14 Jan	Nashua Nedtel Cellular Masters	Eastern Cape	1,000,000	(Zimbabwe) Mark McNulty (31)	12		
21 Jan	Alfred Dunhill Championship	Gauteng	£500,000	(Australia) Adam Scott (n/a)	18	EUR	
28 Jan	Mercedes-Benz South African Open	Eastern Cape	US$1,000,000	(Zimbabwe) Mark McNulty (32)	32	EUR	Flagship event
4 Feb	Dimension Data Pro-Am	North West	2,000,000	(Northern Ireland) Darren Clarke (n/a)	28		Pro-Am
11 Feb	South African PGA Championship	Gauteng	1,000,000	(South Africa) Deane Pappas (1)	12		
18 Feb	Investec Royal Swazi Sun Open	Swaziland	500,000	(South Africa) Bradford Vaughan (3)	12		
25 Feb	The Tour Championship	Mpumalanga	2,000,000	(South Africa) Darren Fichardt (2)	16		New tournament Tour Championship

== Order of Merit ==
The Order of Merit was based on prize money won during the season, calculated in South African rand.

Position	Player	Prize money (R)
1	(Zimbabwe) Mark McNulty	1,603,481
2	(South Africa) Bradford Vaughan	686,415
3	(South Africa) Roger Wessels	632,383
4	(South Africa) Hennie Otto	620,211
5	(South Africa) Trevor Immelman	619,766

== Awards ==
Award	Winner	Ref.
Rookie of the Year (Bobby Locke Trophy)	(South Africa) Trevor Immelman	
