= 1995–96 Southern Africa Tour =

Golf tour season

1995–96 Southern Africa Tour season
- Duration: 21 April 1995 – 3 March 1996
- Number of official events: 27
- Most wins: (South Africa) Steve van Vuuren (4)
- Order of Merit: (South Africa) Wayne Westner
- Rookie of the Year: (Scotland) Alan McLean

The 1995–96 Southern Africa Tour, titled as the 1995–96 FNB Tour for sponsorship reasons, was the 25th season of the Southern Africa Tour, the main professional golf tour in South Africa since it was formed in 1971.

It was the fourth season of the tour under a title sponsorship agreement with First National Bank, that began in 1992.

== Schedule ==
The following table lists official events during the 1995–96 season.

| Date | Tournament | Location | Purse (R) | Winner (Note: The number in brackets after each winner's name is the number of Southern Africa Tour events they had won up to and including that tournament. This information is only shown for Southern Africa Tour members.) | OWGR points | Other tours (Note: EUR − European Tour.) | Notes |
|---|---|---|---|---|---|---|---|
| 23 Apr | Iscor Newcastle Classic | KwaZulu-Natal | 60,000 | (South Africa) Steve van Vuuren (1) | n/a | | New to Southern Africa Tour |
| 29 Apr | Kalahari Classic | Gauteng | 60,000 | (South Africa) A. P. Botes (1) | n/a | | |
| 7 May | Amatola Sun Classic | Eastern Cape | 50,000 | (South Africa) Richard Kaplan (1) | n/a | | New to Southern Africa Tour |
| 11 May | Radio Algoa Challenge | Eastern Cape | 50,000 | (South Africa) Brett Liddle (1) | n/a | | New tournament |
| 16 May | FNB Pro Series (Eastern Cape) | Eastern Cape | 100,000 | (Namibia) Schalk van der Merwe (1) | n/a | | New tournament series |
| 24 Jun | Rustenburg Classic | North West | 75,000 | (South Africa) Brett Liddle (2) | n/a | | New tournament |
| 29 Jun | FNB Pro Series (Royal Swazi) | Swaziland | 100,000 | (South Africa) James Kingston (1) | n/a | | |
| 15 Jul | Bushveld Classic | Limpopo | 75,000 | (South Africa) Kevin Stone (1) | n/a | | New to Southern Africa Tour |
| 3 Aug | Sun City Classic | North West | 60,000 | (South Africa) Graeme van der Nest (1) | n/a | | |
| 16 Aug | Mmabatho Sun Classic | Mpumalanga | 50,000 | (South Africa) Steve van Vuuren (2) | n/a | | New tournament |
| 2 Sep | IDC Development Classic | Mpumalanga | 100,000 | (Eswatini) Paul Friedlander (1) | n/a | | New tournament |
| 17 Sep | Bearing Man Highveld Classic | Mpumalanga | 75,000 | (South Africa) Russell Fletcher (1) | n/a | | New to Southern Africa Tour |
| 30 Sep | FNB Pro Series (Western Cape) | Western Cape | 100,000 | (South Africa) Richard Kaplan (2) | n/a | | |
| 7 Oct | FNB Pro Series (Free State) | Free State | 100,000 | (South Africa) Justin Hobday (2) | n/a | | |
| 14 Oct | Phalaborwa Mafunyane Trophy | Limpopo | 100,000 | (South Africa) Roger Wessels (2) | n/a | | New tournament |
| 20 Oct | Sanlam Classic Tournament | KwaZulu-Natal | 100,000 | (South Africa) Steve van Vuuren (3) | n/a | | New tournament |
| 28 Oct | Lombard Tyres Classic | Gauteng | 100,000 | (South Africa) Ashley Roestoff (2) | n/a | | New tournament |
| 8 Nov | FNB Pro Series (Namibia Open) | Namibia | 100,000 | (South Africa) James Kingston (2) | n/a | | |
| 18 Nov | FNB Pro Series (Botswana Open) | Botswana | 100,000 | (South Africa) Steve van Vuuren (4) | n/a | | |
| 26 Nov | Zimbabwe Open | Zimbabwe | 400,000 | (Zimbabwe) Nick Price (7) | 20 | | |
| 21 Jan | Philips South African Open | Western Cape | 750,000 | (South Africa) Ernie Els (9) | 20 | | |
| 28 Jan | San Lameer South African Masters | KwaZulu-Natal | 750,000 | (South Africa) Wayne Westner (5) | 14 | | |
| 4 Feb | Nashua Wild Coast Sun Classic | Western Cape | 750,000 | (South Africa) Wayne Westner (6) | 14 | | |
| 11 Feb | Dimension Data Pro-Am | North West | £400,000 | (Zimbabwe) Mark McNulty (24) | 30 | EUR | New Pro-Am tournament |
| 18 Feb | Alfred Dunhill South African PGA Championship | Gauteng | £300,000 | (Germany) Sven Strüver (n/a) | 22 | EUR | |
| 25 Feb | FNB Players Championship | KwaZulu-Natal | £400,000 | (South Africa) Wayne Westner (7) | 28 | EUR | |
| 3 Mar | Hollard Royal Swazi Sun Classic | Swaziland | 500,000 | (South Africa) Richard Kaplan (3) | 12 | | |

=== Unofficial events ===
The following events were sanctioned by the Southern Africa Tour, but did not carry official money, nor were wins official.

| Date | Tournament | Location | Purse (R) | Winner | OWGR points | Notes |
|---|---|---|---|---|---|---|
| 3 Dec | Nedbank Million Dollar Challenge | North West | US$2,500,000 | (United States) Corey Pavin | 46 | Limited-field event |

== Order of Merit ==
The Order of Merit was based on prize money won during the season, calculated in South African rand.

| Position | Player | Prize money (R) |
|---|---|---|
| 1 | (South Africa) Wayne Westner | 709,389 |
| 2 | (Zimbabwe) Mark McNulty | 514,405 |
| 3 | (South Africa) Brenden Pappas | 369,560 |
| 4 | (United States) Michael Christie | 191,840 |
| 5 | (South Africa) Richard Kaplan | 169,216 |

== Awards ==
| Award | Winner | Ref. |
|---|---|---|
| Rookie of the Year (Bobby Locke Trophy) | (Scotland) Alan McLean | |
