= Steve van Vuuren =

South African professional golfer (born 1959)

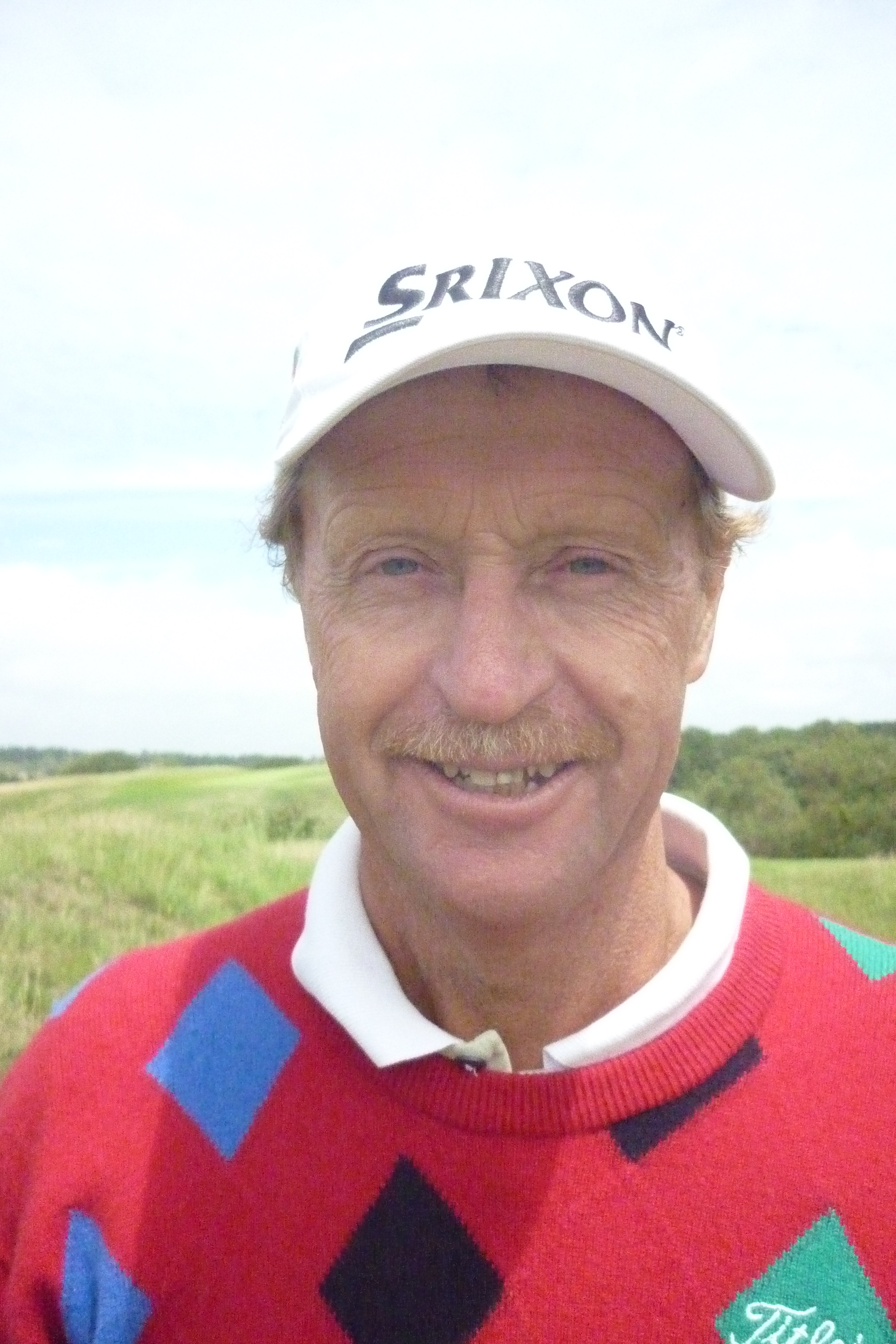

Personal information
- Full name: Stephen Daniel van Vuuren
- Nationality: South Africa
- Born: 26 September 1959 (age 67) Germiston, South Africa
- Height: 1.79 m (5 ft 10 in)

Career
- Sport: Golf
- Turned professional: 1981
- Former tour: Sunshine Tour
- Professional wins: 19

Number of wins by tour
- Sunshine Tour: 6
- Other: 13

Stephen Daniel van Vuuren (born 26 September 1959) is a South African professional golfer who currently plays on the Sunshine Tour. He won six times on the Sunshine Tour between 1995 and 2007.

== Early life ==
Van Vuuren was born Germiston, Gauteng, South Africa.

== Professional career ==
In 1981, Van Vuuren turned professional. Early in his career, he played on the SA Winter Tour, winning the Order of Merit in 1995.

In 1993, he joined the Sunshine Tour. His best year by far on the Sunshine Tour was in the 1995–96 season where he won four times, finishing 7th on the Order of Merit.

== Amateur wins ==
- Transvaal Under 23

== Professional wins (19) ==
=== Sunshine Tour wins (6) ===
No.	Date	Tournament	Winning score	Margin of victory	Runner(s)-up
1	23 Apr 1995	Iscor Newcastle Classic	−11 (68-68-69=205)	1 stroke	(Namibia) Schalk van der Merwe
2	16 Aug 1995	Mmabatho Sun Classic	−4 (69-71-72=212)	2 strokes	(South Africa) Sammy Daniels, (South Africa) Justin Hobday
3	20 Oct 1995	Sanlam Classic Tournament	−8 (67-72-69=208)	1 stroke	(South Africa) Ian Hutchings
4	18 Nov 1995	FNB Pro Series (Botswana Open)	−15 (62-66-70=198)	2 strokes	(South Africa) Mark Murless (a)
5	12 Jun 2004	Vodacom Origins of Golf at Schoeman Park	−16 (66-65-69=200)	4 strokes	(South Africa) Ulrich van den Berg
6	11 Mar 2007	Mount Edgecombe Trophy	−12 (68-66-72-70=276)	1 stroke	(South Africa) Desvonde Botes, (South Africa) Des Terblanche, (South Africa) Tjaart van der Walt

=== Other South Africa wins (6) ===
- 1988 Club Pro Championship
- 1989 SA Winter Champion, Stannic Sun City Pro-Am, State Mines
- 1992 Centurion Lake Challenge
- 1996 J & B Africa Classic

=== Sunshine Senior Tour wins (7) ===
- 2010 Senior Tour Masters
- 2010 Charter Link Senior Players
- 2010 Klipdrif Lost City Pro-Am
- 2010 Magalies Park Challenge
- 2011 Roodepoort SA Senior Players
- 2012 SA Senior Tour Masters
- 2014 Middleburg Power Train Classic
