= 1998–99 Southern Africa Tour =

Golf tour season

1998–99 Southern Africa Tour season
- Duration: 16 April 1998 – 21 February 1999
- Number of official events: 24
- Most wins: (South Africa) Desvonde Botes (2) (Zimbabwe) Marc Cayeux (2) (South Africa) Sammy Daniels (2) (South Africa) Justin Hobday (2) (South Africa) Ashley Roestoff (2)
- Order of Merit: (South Africa) David Frost

The 1998–99 Southern Africa Tour, titled as the 1998–99 Vodacom Tour for sponsorship reasons, was the 28th season of the Southern Africa Tour, the main professional golf tour in South Africa since it was formed in 1971.

It was the second season of the tour under a title sponsorship agreement with Vodacom, that was announced in June 1997.

== Changes for 1998–99 ==
The season marked the first year in which the South African Open was granted "flagship event" status by the Official World Golf Ranking, awarding a minimum of 32 points to the winner.

== Schedule ==
The following table lists official events during the 1998–99 season.

Date	Tournament	Location	Purse (R)	Winner (Note: The number in brackets after each winner's name is the number of Southern Africa Tour events they had won up to and including that tournament. This information is only shown for Southern Africa Tour members.)	OWGR points	Other tours (Note: EUR − European Tour.)	Notes
18 Apr	Vodacom Series (Western Cape)	Western Cape	165,000	(Scotland) Alan McLean (1)	n/a		
25 Apr	Kalahari Classic	Northern Cape	75,000	(South Africa) Andrew McLardy (2)	n/a		
2 May	Pietersburg Classic	Limpopo	100,000	(South Africa) Desvonde Botes (5)	n/a		New tournament
16 May	Vodacom Series (Eastern Cape)	Eastern Cape	165,000	(South Africa) Sammy Daniels (1)	n/a		
31 May	Vodacom Series (KwaZulu-Natal)	KwaZulu-Natal	165,000	(South Africa) Keith Horne (1)	n/a		
12 Jul	Vodacom Series (Mpumalanga)	Mpumalanga	165,000	(South Africa) Callie Swart (1)	n/a		
8 Aug	Fish River Sun Pro-Am	Eastern Cape	200,000	(South Africa) Ashley Roestoff (4)	n/a		Pro-Am
15 Aug	Royal Swazi Sun Classic	Swaziland	150,000	(South Africa) Justin Hobday (4)	n/a		New tournament
4 Sep	Absa Bank Corporate Challenge	Gauteng	150,000	(South Africa) Warren Abery (1)	n/a		New tournament
13 Sep	Bearing Man Highveld Classic	Mpumalanga	100,000	(South Africa) Wayne Bradley (1)	n/a		
19 Sep	Vodacom Series (Free State)	Free State	165,000	(South Africa) Gary Matthews (1)	n/a		
26 Sep	FNB Botswana Open	Botswana	150,000	(South Africa) Justin Hobday (5)	n/a		
4 Oct	Phalaborwa Mafunyane Trophy	Limpopo	175,000	(South Africa) Sammy Daniels (2)	n/a		
16 Oct	Vodacom Series (Gauteng)	Gauteng	165,000	(South Africa) Brenden Pappas (1)	n/a		
25 Oct	FNB Namibia Open	Namibia	150,000	(South Africa) Ashley Roestoff (5)	n/a		
8 Nov	Platinum Classic	North West	100,000	(South Africa) Bobby Lincoln (4)	n/a		
22 Nov	Zambia Open	Zambia	400,000	(Zimbabwe) Marc Cayeux (1)	n/a		
29 Nov	Zimbabwe Open	Zimbabwe	450,000	(Zimbabwe) Nick Price (12)	16		
17 Jan	Alfred Dunhill South African PGA Championship	Gauteng	£400,000	(South Africa) Ernie Els (11)	24	EUR	
24 Jan	Mercedes-Benz - Vodacom South African Open	Western Cape	US$1,000,000	(South Africa) David Frost (5)	34	EUR	Flagship event
31 Jan	Vodacom Players Championship	KwaZulu-Natal	1,000,000	(England) Chris Davison (2)	12		
7 Feb	Dimension Data Pro-Am	North West	2,000,000	(United States) Scott Dunlap (2)	14		Pro-Am
14 Feb	South African Masters	Free State	600,000	(South Africa) Desvonde Botes (6)	12		
21 Feb	Stenham Royal Swazi Sun Open	Swaziland	1,000,000	(Zimbabwe) Marc Cayeux (2)	12		

=== Unofficial events ===
The following events were sanctioned by the Southern Africa Tour, but did not carry official money, nor were wins official.

Date	Tournament	Location	Purse (R)	Winner	OWGR points	Notes
6 Dec	Nedbank Million Dollar Challenge	North West	US$2,500,000	(Zimbabwe) Nick Price	48	Limited-field event

== Order of Merit ==
The Order of Merit was based on prize money won during the season, calculated in South African rand.

Position	Player	Prize money (R)
1	(South Africa) David Frost	1,189,762
2	(United States) Scott Dunlap	885,792
3	(South Africa) Richard Kaplan	525,151
4	(South Africa) Desvonde Botes	410,598
5	(South Africa) Ashley Roestoff	367,726
