= Wallie Coetsee =

South African professional golfer

Personal information
- Nationality: South Africa
- Born: 11 July 1972 (age 54) Johannesburg, South Africa
- Height: 6 ft 4 in (1.93 m)
- Weight: 210 lb (95 kg; 15 st)
- Spouse: Ashley
- Children: Zoe & Kelly

Career
- Sport: Golf
- Turned professional: 1992
- Current tour: Sunshine Tour
- Professional wins: 2

Number of wins by tour
- Sunshine Tour: 2

Wallie Coetsee (born 11 July 1972) is a South African professional golfer.

== Early life ==
Coetsee was encouraged to take up the game of golf by his father, Ockert, a tomato farmer in Tzaneen. He played very little competitive golf as an amateur and won only a few small tournaments.

== Professional career ==
In 1992, Coetsee turned professional. He struggled to make an impression on the Sunshine Tour. He convinced his father to allow him three more years on the tour, and promised that if he didn't make it he would join him working on the family farm.

Coetsee improved slightly and again begged his father for another year. The result was his maiden professional victory in the 1997 FNB Namibia Open - a win which sparked off one of his most successful years on the Tour. Coetsee finished 11th at the 1999 South African Open.

Years later, he won the 2014 Mopani Copper Mines Zambia Open.

== Personal life ==
In June 2012, Wallie and his family decided to relocate to Jeffreys Bay in the Eastern Cape where he would focus more seriously on his golf and it would also give him quality time with his family.

== Professional wins (2) ==
=== Sunshine Tour wins (2) ===
No.	Date	Tournament	Winning score	Margin of victory	Runner(s)-up
1	13 Sep 1997	FNB Namibia Open	−10 (69-69-65=203)	1 stroke	(South Africa) Brett Liddle
2	18 May 2014	Mopani Copper Mines Zambia Open	−15 (65-69-68-71=273)	1 stroke	(South Africa) Justin Harding, (South Africa) Daniel van Tonder
