= Nasho Kamungeremu =

Zimbabwean golfer

Nasho Kamungeremu (c. 1973 – 3 August 2007) was a Zimbabwean professional golfer and President of the Zimbabwe Professional Golfers Association (ZPGA).

== Career ==
Kamungeremu was from Kotwa, in Mudzi. He began to play golf at school in 1984, and in 1988 he was the first black to win the Zimbabwe Junior Strokeplay. He also played in South Africa, Botswana, the United States, and Canada.

In 2004 Kamungeremu was suspended from the sport for assaulting another player, but was later pardoned. In 2005 he was elected ZPGA President, and in 2007 he was re-elected.

== Death ==
He died of a heart attack at the age of 34 on August 3, 2007, in Avenues Clinic, Harare, several hours after presiding over a tournament, and was buried in Kotwa.

== Professional wins (1) ==
=== Southern Africa Tour wins (1) ===
No.	Date	Tournament	Score	Margin of victory	Runner-up
1	30 Aug 1997	FNB Botswana Open	−8 (72-65-68=205)	1 stroke	(Zimbabwe) Marc Cayeux

== Team appearances ==
Amateur

- Eisenhower Trophy (representing Zimbabwe): 1992, 1994
