= Darren Fichardt =

South African professional golfer (born 1975)

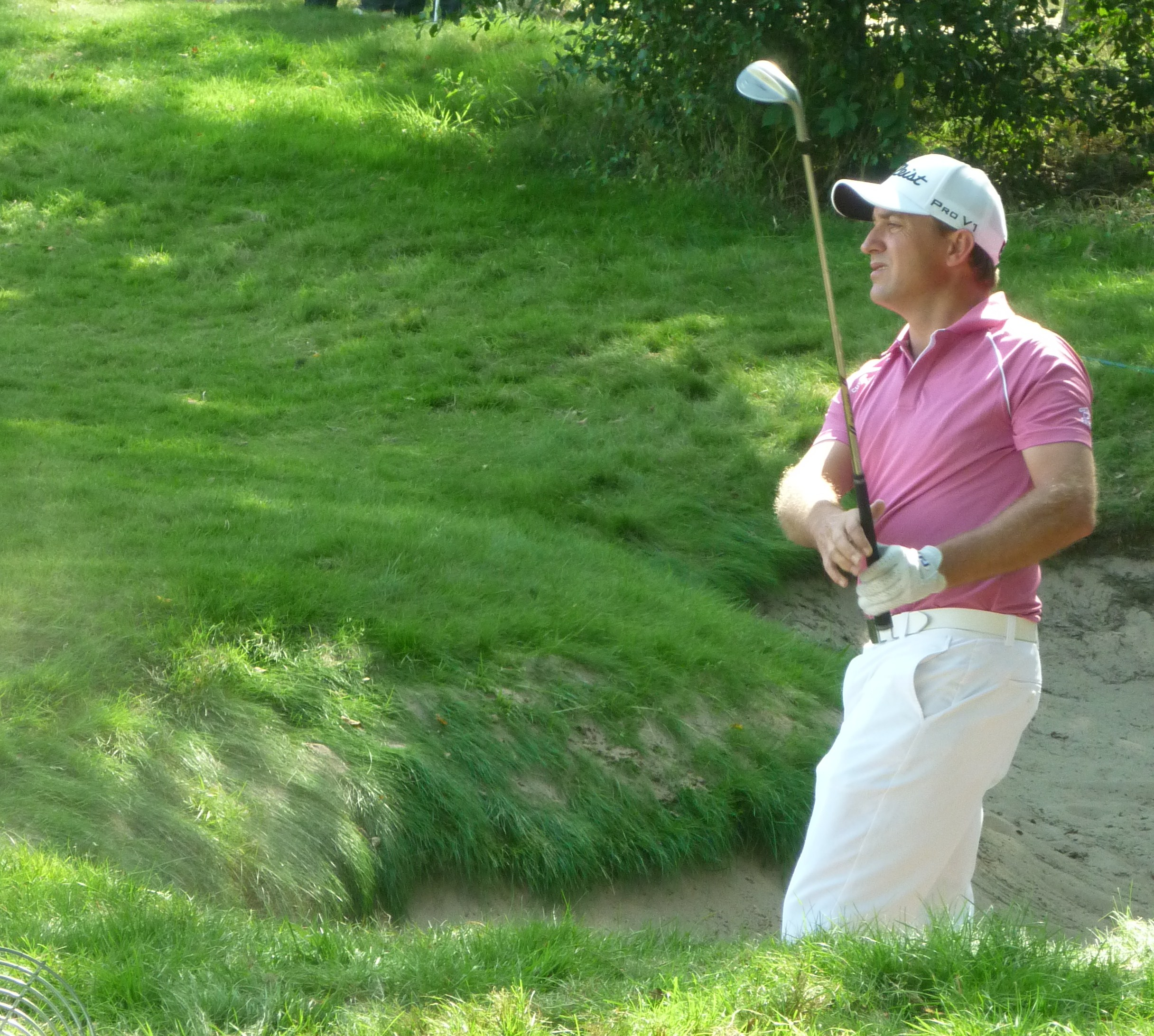

Personal information
- Full name: Darren Clive Fichardt
- Nationality: South Africa
- Born: 13 May 1975 (age 51) Pretoria, South Africa
- Height: 1.72 m (5 ft 8 in)
- Weight: 75 kg (165 lb; 11.8 st)
- Spouse: Natasha (m. 2000)
- Children: 2

Career
- Sport: Golf
- Turned professional: 1994
- Current tours: European Tour; Sunshine Tour; European Senior Tour
- Former tour: Challenge Tour
- Professional wins: 27
- Highest ranking: 75 (10 March 2013)

Number of wins by tour
- European Tour: 5
- Sunshine Tour: 18
- Challenge Tour: 2
- PGA Tour Champions: 1
- European Senior Tour: 2
- Other: 2

Best results in major championships
- Masters Tournament: DNP
- PGA Championship: DNP
- U.S. Open: CUT: 2007
- The Open Championship: 80th: 2024

Achievements and awards
- Sunshine Tour Order of Merit winner: 1999–2000, 2003–04
- Sunshine Tour Players' Player of the Year: 2013
- European Senior Tour Rookie of the Year: 2025

Darren Clive Fichardt (born 13 May 1975) is a South African professional golfer who plays on both the European Tour and the Sunshine Tour.

== Early life ==
Fichardt was born in Pretoria and grew up in Centurion, Gauteng. He attended Sutherland High School from 1988 to 1993, where his talent for golf was nurtured.

== Professional career ==
Fichardt turned professional in 1994 and he won the Southern Africa Tour (now the Sunshine Tour) Order of Merit in 1999/2000 and 2003/04. He partnered Retief Goosen in South Africa's WGC-World Cup team in 2000.

Fichardt has played on the European Tour since 2001 and has won five European Tour events. His best year-end ranking on the Order of Merit is when he ranked 39th in 2003.

In 2012, Fichardt ended a nine-year title drought on the European Tour when he won the Saint-Omer Open by three strokes from Gary Lockerbie. This victory earned him his third European Tour title.

Fichardt followed this up in the 2013 season, when he won the Africa Open in his native South Africa in February. He claimed his fourth European Tour title by two strokes over Grégory Bourdy and Jaco van Zyl.

In February 2017, Fichardt won the weather-shortened Joburg Open for his fifth victory on the European Tour and seventeenth victory on the Sunshine Tour.

On 21 August 2020, Fichardt won the Betway Championship. This was the first event in return on the Sunshine Tour after the COVID-19 hiatus. He shot a final round 64 to beat Ulrich van den Berg by one shot.

== Amateur wins ==
- 1992 Northern Transvaal Junior Championship (South Africa)
- 1993 Northern Transvaal Stroke Play Championship (South Africa)

== Professional wins (27) ==
=== European Tour wins (5) ===
No.	Date	Tournament	Winning score	Margin of victory	Runner(s)-up
1	25 Mar 2001	São Paulo Brazil Open	−18 (67-61-67=195) (Note: Shortened to 54 holes due to weather.)	5 strokes	(Argentina) José Cóceres, (Sweden) Richard S. Johnson, (Australia) Brett Rumford
2	16 Mar 2003	Qatar Masters	−13 (71-69-66-69=275)	Playoff	(South Africa) James Kingston
3	17 Jun 2012	Saint-Omer Open^{1}	−5 (68-69-69-73=279)	3 strokes	(England) Gary Lockerbie
4	17 Feb 2013	Africa Open^{2}	−16 (69-67-65-71=272)	2 strokes	(France) Grégory Bourdy, (South Africa) Jaco van Zyl
5	26 Feb 2017	Joburg Open^{2}	−15 (66-66-68=200)	1 stroke	(Wales) Stuart Manley, (England) Paul Waring

^{1}Dual-ranking event with the Challenge Tour
^{2}Co-sanctioned by the Sunshine Tour

European Tour playoff record (1–1)

No.	Year	Tournament	Opponent(s)	Result
1	2002	Murphy's Irish Open	(England) Richard Bland, (Sweden) Niclas Fasth, (Denmark) Søren Hansen	Hansen won with birdie on fourth extra hole Bland eliminated by birdie on second hole
2	2003	Qatar Masters	(South Africa) James Kingston	Won with birdie on first extra hole

=== Sunshine Tour wins (18) ===
Legend
Tour Championships (2)
Other Sunshine Tour (16)

No.	Date	Tournament	Winning score	Margin of victory	Runner(s)-up
1	21 Sep 1997	Bearing Man Highveld Classic	−16 (65-66-69=200)	1 stroke	(South Africa) Sean Pappas
2	25 Feb 2001	The Tour Championship	−14 (66-69-67-68=270)	4 strokes	(South Africa) Hennie Otto
3	25 Nov 2001	CABS/Old Mutual Zimbabwe Open	−13 (68-69-69-69=275)	3 strokes	(South Africa) Mark Murless, (South Africa) Bradford Vaughan
4	1 Feb 2004	Dimension Data Pro-Am	−10 (72-69-69-68=278)	2 strokes	(Zimbabwe) Nick Price, (South Africa) Ulrich van den Berg
5	6 Oct 2006	Vodacom Origins of Golf Final	−4 (71-69-72=212)	1 stroke	(South Africa) Alex Haindl
6	15 Oct 2006	Bearing Man Highveld Classic (2)	−12 (66-67-71=204)	Playoff	(South Africa) Alex Haindl
7	1 Feb 2009	Nashua Masters	−17 (66-67-65-65=263)	1 stroke	(Zimbabwe) Marc Cayeux
8	18 Sep 2009	Vodacom Origins of Golf (2) at Selborne	−18 (65-66-67=198)	7 strokes	(South Africa) Keenan Davidse, (South Africa) Jbe' Kruger
9	31 Oct 2009	Platinum Classic	−15 (70-65-66=201)	1 stroke	(South Africa) Titch Moore
10	14 Feb 2010	Dimension Data Pro-Am (2)	−16 (66-68-71-68=273)	1 stroke	(South Africa) Louis Oosthuizen
11	12 Aug 2011	Vodacom Origins of Golf (3) at Wild Coast Sun	−6 (73-67-64=204)	1 stroke	(South Africa) David Hewan
12	22 Oct 2011	Suncoast Classic	−13 (70-65-68=204)	6 strokes	(South Africa) Ulrich van den Berg
13	17 Feb 2013	Africa Open^{1}	−16 (69-67-65-71=272)	2 strokes	(France) Grégory Bourdy, (South Africa) Jaco van Zyl
14	13 Nov 2015	Vodacom Origins of Golf Final (4)	−14 (61-71-70=202)	1 stroke	(South Africa) Tyrone Mordt, (South Africa) Callum Mowat, (South Africa) Jake Redman
15	26 Feb 2017	Joburg Open^{1}	−15 (66-66-68=200)	1 stroke	(Wales) Stuart Manley, (England) Paul Waring
16	18 Mar 2018	The Tour Championship (2)	−17 (68-66-68-69=271)	1 stroke	(South Africa) Oliver Bekker
17	19 Jan 2020	Eye of Africa PGA Championship	−20 (65-70-65-68=268)	Playoff	(Chile) Matías Calderón
18	21 Aug 2020	Betway Championship	−3 (73-70-64=207)	1 stroke	(South Africa) Ulrich van den Berg

^{1}Co-sanctioned by the European Tour

Sunshine Tour playoff record (2–3)

No.	Year	Tournament	Opponent(s)	Result
1	1999	Bearing Man Highveld Classic	(South Africa) Bobby Lincoln, (Zimbabwe) Lyall McNeill	Lincoln won with birdie on first extra hole
2	2006	Bearing Man Highveld Classic	(South Africa) Alex Haindl	Won with birdie on second extra hole
3	2008	Mount Edgecombe Trophy	(South Africa) Mark Murless	Lost to par on first extra hole
4	2018	Sun Wild Coast Sun Challenge	(Brazil) Adilson da Silva, (South Africa) Hennie du Plessis, (South Africa) Vaughn Groenewald	Groenewald won with birdie on first extra hole
5	2020	Eye of Africa PGA Championship	(Chile) Matías Calderón	Won with birdie on third extra hole

=== Challenge Tour wins (2) ===
No.	Date	Tournament	Winning score	Margin of victory	Runner-up
1	17 Jun 2012	Saint-Omer Open^{1}	−5 (68-69-69-73=279)	3 strokes	(England) Gary Lockerbie
2	2 Jul 2023	Le Vaudreuil Golf Challenge	−15 (68-68-70-67=273)	2 strokes	(Wales) Oliver Farr

^{1}Dual-ranking event with the European Tour

=== Other wins (2) ===
- 1999 Sun City Pro-Am, PGA's Cup (both unofficial money on the Southern Africa Tour)

=== PGA Tour Champions wins (1) ===
Legend
Charles Schwab Cup playoff events (1)
Other PGA Tour Champions (0)

No.	Date	Tournament	Winning score	Margin of victory	Runner-up
1	1 Nov 2026	Simmons Bank Championship	−22 (69-61-64=194)	1 stroke	(United States) Zach Johnson

=== European Senior Tour wins (2) ===
No.	Date	Tournament	Winning score	Margin of victory	Runner-up
1	28 Nov 2025	Vattanac Legends Championship Legacy Edition	−19 (67-64-66=197)	1 stroke	(Australia) Scott Hend
2	9 Aug 2026	Staysure PGA Seniors Championship	−12 (66-73-69-68=276)	5 strokes	(Sweden) Mikael Lundberg

European Senior Tour playoff record (0–1)

No.	Year	Tournament	Opponent	Result
1	2025	Staysure PGA Seniors Championship	(United States) Bo Van Pelt	Lost to birdie on first extra hole

== Results in major championships ==
Tournament	2000	2001	2002	2003	2004	2005	2006	2007	2008	2009	2010	2011	2012	2013	2014	2015	2016	2017	2018
Masters Tournament																			
U.S. Open								CUT											
The Open Championship	CUT		CUT		CUT				CUT		CUT							CUT	
PGA Championship																			

Tournament	2019	2020	2021	2022	2023	2024	2025
Masters Tournament							
PGA Championship							
U.S. Open							
The Open Championship						80	CUT

Did not play

CUT = missed the half-way cut
"T" = tied
NT = no tournament due to COVID-19 pandemic

== Results in World Golf Championships ==
Tournament	2000	2001	2002	2003	2004	2005	2006	2007	2008	2009	2010	2011	2012	2013	2014
Match Play															
Championship	T40	NT^{1}			T59										
Invitational															
Champions											T34			T61	62

^{1}Cancelled due to 9/11

Did not play

"T" = Tied
NT = No tournament
Note that the HSBC Champions did not become a WGC event until 2009.

== Team appearances ==
- World Cup (representing South Africa): 2000

== See also ==
- 2005 European Tour Qualifying School graduates
- 2011 European Tour Qualifying School graduates
- 2019 European Tour Qualifying School graduates
- 2023 European Tour Qualifying School graduates
