= Des Terblanche =

South African professional golfer (born 1965)

Personal information
- Full name: Desmond Terblanche
- Nationality: South Africa
- Born: 27 October 1965 (age 61) Vryburg, South Africa
- Height: 1.92 m (6 ft 4 in)
- Weight: 130 kg (287 lb; 20 st 7 lb)

Career
- Sport: Golf
- Turned professional: 1987
- Former tours: European Tour; Asian Tour; Sunshine Tour
- Professional wins: 17

Number of wins by tour
- Asian Tour: 3
- Sunshine Tour: 7
- Other: 7

Desmond Terblanche (born 27 October 1965) is a South African professional golfer who plays currently on the Sunshine Tour. He has won 12 times on the Sunshine Tour, along with three wins on the Asian Tour.

== Early life and amateur career ==
Terblanche was born in Vryburg, South Africa. He won the Junior World Championship in 1983.

== Professional career ==
In 1987, Terblanche turned professional. His 12 wins on the Sunshine Tour came between 1989 and 2007.

== Personal life ==
In 1988, Terblanche married and now has two teenage children.

== Amateur wins ==
- 1980-83 Junior Springbok
- 1983 Junior World Championship
- 1985 SA under 23

== Professional wins (17) ==
=== Asian PGA Tour wins (3) ===
No.	Date	Tournament	Winning score	Margin of victory	Runner-up
1	10 Aug 1997	Sabah Masters	−7 (73-72-70-66=281)	Playoff	(Thailand) Thammanoon Sriroj
2	20 Dec 1997	Volvo Asian Matchplay	Concession		(Australia) Brett Partridge
3	3 Dec 2000	Thailand Open	−19 (67-65-70-67=269)	1 stroke	(Thailand) Thongchai Jaidee

Asian PGA Tour playoff record (1–0)

No.	Year	Tournament	Opponent	Result
1	1997	Sabah Masters	(Thailand) Thammanoon Sriroj	Won with birdie on third extra hole

=== Sunshine Tour wins (7) ===
No.	Date	Tournament	Winning score	Margin of victory	Runner(s)-up
1	18 Nov 1989	Railfreight Bloemfontein Classic	−10 (74-67-67-70=278)	2 strokes	(South Africa) John Bland, (South Africa) Wayne Westner
2	15 Sep 1996	Bearing Man Highveld Classic	−16 (69-68-63=200)	1 stroke	(South Africa) Bobby Lincoln
3	19 Oct 1996	FNB Pro Series (Botswana)	−13 (65-65-70=200)	2 strokes	(South Africa) John Mashego
4	27 Jun 1997	Vodacom Series (Eastern Cape)	−5 (75-68-68=211)	2 strokes	(South Africa) André Cruse
5	17 Sep 2000	Emfuleni Classic	−13 (68-68-67=203)	1 stroke	(South Africa) James Kingston, (South Africa) Bradford Vaughan
6	18 May 2003	Capital Alliance Royal Swazi Sun Open	36 pts (13-18-5=36)	Playoff	(Brazil) Adilson da Silva
7	5 May 2007	Samsung Royal Swazi Sun Open (2)	50 pts (14-11-13-12=50)	2 strokes	(South Africa) James Kamte

Sunshine Tour playoff record (1–0)

No.	Year	Tournament	Opponent	Result
1	2003	Capital Alliance Royal Swazi Sun Open	(Brazil) Adilson da Silva	Won with par on first extra hole

=== Other South African wins (7) ===
- 1989 Iscor Newcastle Classic
- 1991 Kalahari Classic, SA Winter Championships, Chipkin Catering Supply Sun City Pro-Am (tied with Justin Hobday)
- 1993 Highveld Classic, Mmabatho Sun Leopard Park Classic
- 1994 Royal Swazi Sun Classic
