= Roger Wessels =

South African professional golfer (born 1961)

Personal information
- Full name: Roger Mark Wessels
- Nationality: South Africa
- Born: 4 March 1961 (age 65) Port Elizabeth, South Africa
- Height: 1.91 m (6 ft 3 in)

Career
- Sport: Golf
- Turned professional: 1983
- Former tours: European Tour; Sunshine Tour; Canadian Tour
- Professional wins: 12

Number of wins by tour
- Sunshine Tour: 5
- Other: 7

Best results in major championships
- Masters Tournament: DNP
- PGA Championship: DNP
- U.S. Open: DNP
- The Open Championship: T77: 2002

Roger Mark Wessels (born 4 March 1961) is a South African professional golfer.

== Career ==
Wessels was born in Port Elizabeth. He turned professional at a relatively late age in 1987, without having had any major successes as an amateur. Despite that, he won several times on the Southern Africa Tour, latterly the Sunshine Tour, including the South African PGA Championship in 1991. He also played on the Canadian Tour, where he won the Canadian Masters title in 1994. He represented South Africa in the World Cup at the end of that year.

Wessels played on the European Tour from 1995 through 2003, having his best season in 2000 when he finished 35th on the Order of Merit. He retired from tournament golf at the end of 2003, and has since pursued a career as a teaching professional.

== Professional wins (12) ==
=== Sunshine Tour wins (5) ===
No.	Date	Tournament	Winning score	Margin of victory	Runner(s)-up
1	27 Jan 1991	Lexington PGA Championship	−9 (68-66-68-69=271)	Playoff	(England) Mark James, (United States) Hugh Royer III
2	14 Oct 1995	Phalaborwa Mafunyane Trophy	−4 (69-74-69=212)	Playoff	(South Africa) Hugh Baiocchi
3	10 Nov 1996	Mycom Mafunyane Trophy (2)	−14 (68-66-68=202)	3 strokes	(South Africa) Brett Liddle
4	15 Oct 2000	Observatory Classic	−20 (65-65-66=196)	6 strokes	(South Africa) Justin Hobday, (South Africa) Ashley Roestoff
5	18 Nov 2001	Platinum Classic	−15 (68-69-64=201)	4 strokes	(South Africa) Des Terblanche

Southern Africa Tour playoff record (2–0)

No.	Year	Tournament	Opponent(s)	Result
1	1991	Lexington PGA Championship	(England) Mark James, (United States) Hugh Royer III	Won par with on second extra hole Royer eliminated by par on first hole
2	1995	Phalaborwa Mafunyane Trophy	(South Africa) Hugh Baiocchi	

=== Canadian Tour wins (1) ===
No.	Date	Tournament	Winning score	Margin of victory	Runner-up
1	31 Jul 1994	Canadian Masters	−12 (63-70-69-70=272)	1 stroke	(Canada) Ray Stewart

=== Other South African wins (4) ===
- 1992 Tzaneen Classic
- 1994 Kalahari Classic, Mercedes Benz Golf Challenge
- 1995 Renwick Group Classic Pro-Am

=== Other wins (2) ===
- 1994 Sanlam Cancer Challenge Pro-Am
- 1999 Smurfit COC Pro-Am

== Results in major championships ==
Tournament	2002
The Open Championship	T77

Note: Wessels only played in The Open Championship "T" = tied

== Team appearances ==
Professional

- World Cup (representing South Africa): 1994
