= John Mashego =

South African professional golfer

Personal information
- Full name: Mokgeteng John Mashego
- Nationality: South Africa
- Born: 3 January 1951 (age 75) White River, Mpumalanga, South Africa
- Height: 1.68 m (5 ft 6 in)
- Weight: 74 kg (163 lb; 11.7 st)

Career
- Sport: Golf
- Turned professional: 1981
- Current tour: Sunshine Tour
- Former tour: European Seniors Tour
- Professional wins: 1

Mokgeteng John Mashego (born 3 January 1951) is a South African golfer.

== Career ==
In 1951, Mashego was born in White River, Mpumalanga, South Africa.

In 1991, Mashego won the Bushveld Classic where he defeated Steve van Vuuren and Ian Palmer in a playoff. He was the first black player to win a tournament on the Southern African Tour after it lifted its whites-only rule.

Mashego has played more than two hundred and fifty events on the tour but he hasn't won again the rules having been changed too late to allow him to play on the tour through his prime. He has finished sole or tied second in at least three more tournaments, including the Cock of the North event as late as 2000-01.

Since 2002 he has played on the European Seniors Tour, where his best finish is second.

== Professional wins (1) ==
=== Southern Africa Tour wins (1) ===
- 1991 Bushveld Classic
