= Alan McLean (golfer) =

Canadian professional golfer (born 1970)

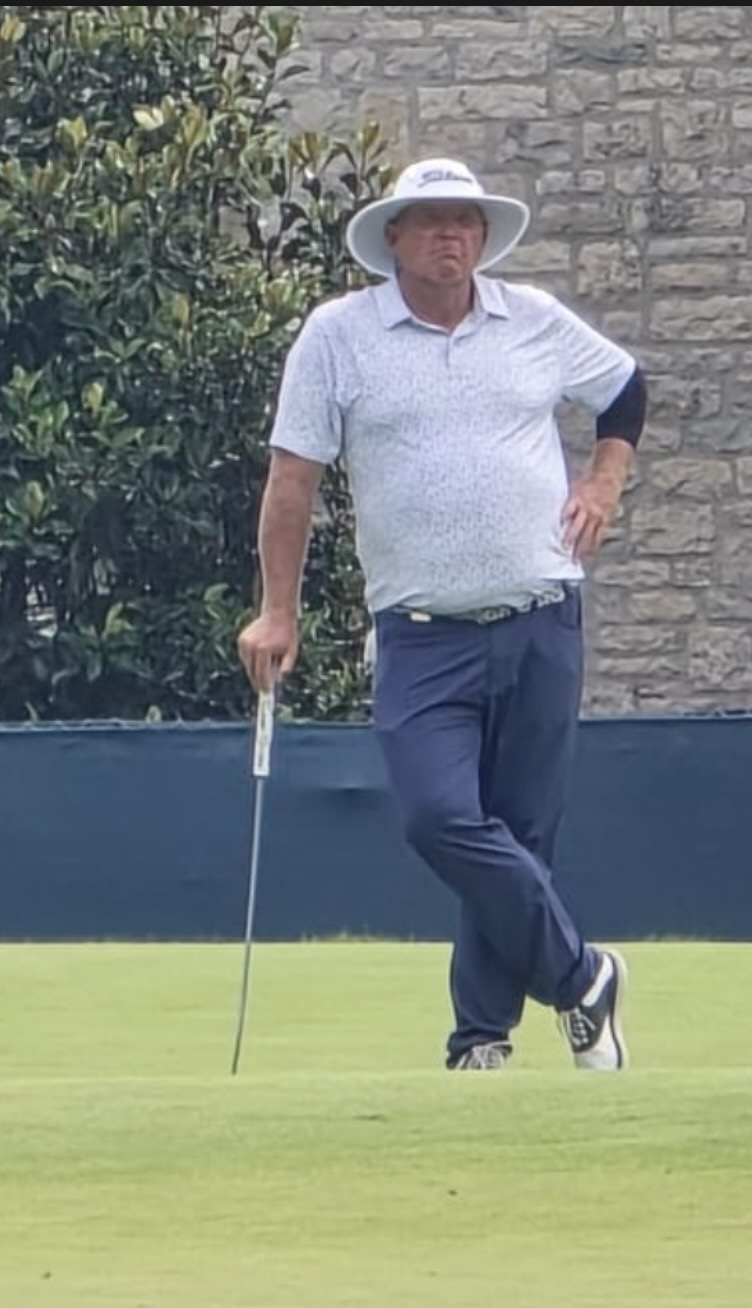
- McLean at the 2026 U.S. Senior Open

Personal information
- Nationality: Scotland; Canada
- Born: 27 September 1970 (age 56) Clydebank, Scotland
- Height: 6 ft 0 in (1.83 m)
- Weight: 220 lb (100 kg)

Career
- Sport: Golf
- Turned professional: 1995
- Former tours: European Tour; Sunshine Tour; Nationwide Tour; PGA Tour Canada; PGA Tour Champions
- Professional wins: 5

Number of wins by tour
- Sunshine Tour: 2
- Other: 3

Achievements and awards
- Southern Africa Tour Rookie of the Year: 1995–96

Alan McLean (born 27 September 1970) is a Scottish-Canadian professional golfer who has competed on the European Tour, Sunshine Tour, Nationwide Tour, Canadian Tour and PGA Tour Champions. Born in Scotland and raised in South Africa, he turned professional in 1995.

McLean has two Sunshine Tour wins, including the 2006 Dimension Data Pro-Am, and also won the 2012 Jamieson WFCU Windsor Roseland Charity Classic on the Canadian Tour. His best finish on the European Tour was third at the 2007 Russian Open and he reached a career-high Official World Golf Ranking of 225th. In senior golf, he won the PGA Seniors' Championship of Canada in 2023 and defended the title in 2024.

== Early life and career ==
McLean was born in Clydebank, Scotland, and raised in South Africa. He was introduced to golf while caddying for his father, though he did not start playing seriously until his early twenties after finishing national service in South Africa.

McLean turned professional in 1995 and played on the Southern Africa Tour, later known as the Sunshine Tour. He was named Rookie of the Year for the 1995–96 season. His first win on the Southern Africa Tour came in 1999 at the Vodacom Series event in the Western Cape. In 2001, he finished tied for second at the Vodacom Players Championship, one stroke behind Ernie Els, alongside Retief Goosen, Trevor Immelman and Martin Maritz.

In 2005, he earned status on the Nationwide Tour, now the Korn Ferry Tour.

During the 2005 Telkom PGA Championship in South Africa, McLean made nine consecutive birdies in one round, a feat later noted in his professional biographies. He won his second Sunshine Tour title at the 2006 Dimension Data Pro-Am at the Gary Player Country Club in Sun City. Tied with Tyrone van Aswegen at three under after regulation, he won with a par on the second playoff hole.

=== European Tour career ===
McLean played on the European Tour at various points and made several trips to the tour's qualifying school. He recorded several top finishes. At the 2004 Open de Sevilla in Spain, he went into the final round in contention after a third-round 68 and finished tied for seventh. His best European Tour result came at the 2007 Russian Open at Le Meridien Moscow Country Club. A final-round 68 left him alone in third at 16 under, behind winner Per-Ulrik Johansson and runner-up Robert-Jan Derksen.

A foot injury in 2008 forced him to miss most of the second half of the season. He received a medical exemption for the start of 2009. At the 2009 Alfred Dunhill Championship at Leopard Creek in South Africa, he closed with a six-under-par 66 to finish tied for sixth. In 2010, he finished tied for 11th at the Alfred Dunhill Links Championship, with rounds of 68, 73, 69 and 71 for a seven-under total of 281.

McLean reached a career-best Official World Golf Ranking of 225th.

=== North American career ===
McLean also played extensively in North America on the Nationwide Tour and Canadian Tour. On the Canadian Tour, he posted several strong finishes before earning his first victory on the circuit. In August 2012, he won the Jamieson WFCU Windsor Roseland Charity Classic in Windsor, Ontario. It was his only win on the circuit and came in his 132nd start. He finished 16th on the Canadian Tour Order of Merit that year. He later became a Class "A" member of the PGA of Canada and has worked as a teaching professional at Echo Valley Golf Club in London, Ontario.

After settling in Canada, McLean became a Canadian citizen and now represents Canada in senior professional competition.

=== Senior career ===
After becoming eligible for senior competition, McLean began playing PGA Tour Champions events. In 2022, he qualified for the U.S. Senior Open at Saucon Valley Country Club in Pennsylvania. He made the cut and finished 60th with rounds of 73, 73, 74 and 77 for a 13-over-par total of 297. He also played the Senior Open Championship that year. He returned to the U.S. Senior Open in 2023 at SentryWorld in Wisconsin, again making the cut and finishing tied for 42nd with rounds of 79, 72, 72 and 73.

In August 2023, he won the PGA Seniors' Championship of Canada at Ledgeview Golf Club in Abbotsford, British Columbia, beating Dennis Hendershott in a playoff after the two finished regulation tied. He defended the title in 2024 at Le Parcours du Vieux Village in Bromont, Quebec. Rounds of 67, 60 and 65 left him at 24 under, five strokes clear of David Morland IV. The second-round 60 included eight birdies and two eagles, and in the final round he made an albatross on the par-5 fifth hole.

His third U.S. Senior Open came in 2026 at Scioto Country Club in Columbus, Ohio. McLean advanced through local and final qualifying before being added to the field as the first alternate from the Oregon, Wisconsin, qualifier, replacing two-time champion Kenny Perry. He made the cut for the third straight time and finished tied for 51st with rounds of 74, 68, 73 and 74 for a nine-over-par total of 289. As of that event, he had made the cut in 11 of 12 career PGA Tour Champions starts and had earned $127,867 in official earnings.

== Professional wins (5) ==
=== Sunshine Tour wins (2) ===
No.	Date	Tournament	Winning score	Margin of victory	Runner(s)-up
1	18 Apr 1998	Vodacom Series (Western Cape)	−15 (63-67-71=201)	5 strokes	(Republic of Ireland) James Loughnane, (South Africa) Sean Ludgater
2	29 Jan 2006	Dimension Data Pro-Am	−3 (68-74-72-71=285)	Playoff	(South Africa) Tyrone van Aswegen

Sunshine Tour playoff record (1–0)

No.	Year	Tournament	Opponent	Result
1	2006	Dimension Data Pro-Am	(South Africa) Tyrone van Aswegen	Won with par on second extra hole

=== Canadian Tour wins (1) ===
No.	Date	Tournament	Winning score	Margin of victory	Runner-up
1	19 Aug 2012	Jamieson WFCU Windsor Roseland Charity Classic	−10 (70-69-65-66=270)	2 strokes	(Chile) Hugo León

=== Other wins (2) ===
- 2023 PGA Seniors' Championship of Canada
- 2024 PGA Seniors' Championship of Canada
