= Brett Liddle =

South African golfer

Personal information
- Full name: Brett Anthony Liddle
- Nationality: South Africa
- Born: 11 March 1970 (age 56) Boksburg, South Africa
- Height: 1.77 m (5 ft 10 in)
- Weight: 86 kg (190 lb; 13.5 st)

Career
- Sport: Golf
- Turned professional: 1992
- Current tour: Sunshine Tour
- Professional wins: 9

Number of wins by tour
- Sunshine Tour: 5
- Other: 4

Brett Anthony Liddle (born 11 March 1970) is a professional golfer from South Africa.

== Career ==
In 1970, Liddle was born in Boksburg.

In 1992, Liddle turned professional and picked up his first win on the Sunshine Tour a year later. He would add five more wins between then and 2000, with his best year on tour being 1995 (he won twice).

== Professional wins (9) ==
=== Sunshine Tour wins (5) ===
No.	Date	Tournament	Winning score	Margin of victory	Runner-up
1	11 May 1995	Radio Algoa Challenge	−11 (70-67-68=205)	4 strokes	(South Africa) Steve van Vuuren
2	24 Jun 1995	Rustenburg Classic	−8 (70-71-67=208)	2 strokes	(South Africa) Steve van Vuuren
3	13 Apr 1996	Kalahari Classic	−8 (71-72-65=208)	1 stroke	(South Africa) James Kingston
4	17 Apr 1999	Lombard Tyres Classic	−19 (67-69-64-69=269)	1 stroke	(South Africa) Hennie Otto
5	14 Apr 2000	Lombard Tyres Classic (2)	−9 (66-70-71=207)	Playoff	(South Africa) Vaughn Groenewald

Sunshine Tour playoff record (1–0)

No.	Year	Tournament	Opponent	Result
1	2000	Lombard Tyres Classic	(South Africa) Vaughn Groenewald	Won with par on second extra hole

=== IGT Pro Tour wins (2) ===
No.	Date	Tournament	Winning score	Margin of victory	Runner(s)-up
1	16 Nov 2012	#34 IGT Race to Q-School	−9 (69-71-67=207)	4 strokes	(South Africa) Johan de Beer, (South Africa) Tyrone Ryan
2	9 Sep 2015	ERPM Challenge	−7 (68-70-71=209)	6 strokes	(South Africa) Herman Minnie

=== Other wins (2) ===
- 1993 Iscor Newcastle Classic
- 1995 Trustbank Gauteng Classic
