= Iscor Newcastle Classic =

The Iscor Newcastle Classic was a golf tournament formerly played on the Sunshine Tour in South Africa. It was first played in the 1980s when the Tour was known as the South African Winter Tour. The 1991 champion was Retief Goosen, who made the Newcastle Classic his first professional win. Goosen would go on to win two U.S. Opens. The last Newcastle Classic was played in the 1996/1997 season.

== Winners ==
- 1996 (South Africa) John Nelson
- 1995 (South Africa) Steve van Vuuren
- 1994 (Zimbabwe) (South Africa) Ian Hutchings
- 1993 (South Africa) Brett Liddle
- 1992 (South Africa) Derek James
- 1991 (South Africa) Retief Goosen
- 1990
- 1989 (South Africa) Des Terblanche
