= Bobby Lincoln =

South African professional golfer (born 1953)

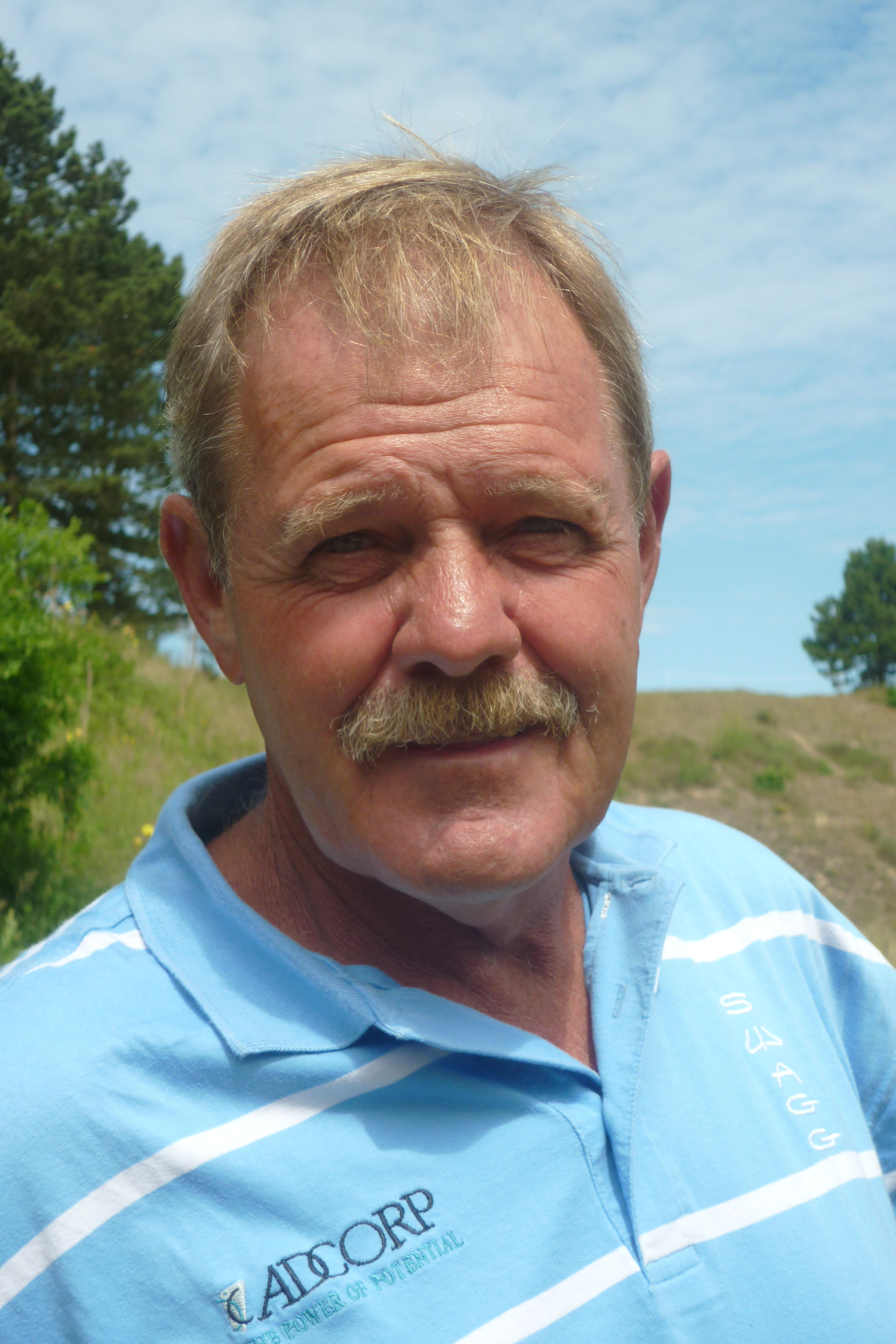

Personal information
- Full name: Robert James Lincoln
- Nationality: South Africa
- Born: 8 September 1953 (age 73) Johannesburg, South Africa
- Height: 6 ft 1 in (1.85 m)
- Weight: 209 lb (95 kg; 14.9 st)

Career
- Sport: Golf
- Turned professional: 1971
- Current tour: European Seniors Tour
- Former tours: European Tour; Sunshine Tour
- Professional wins: 19

Number of wins by tour
- Sunshine Tour: 6
- European Senior Tour: 1
- Other: 12

Best results in major championships
- Masters Tournament: DNP
- PGA Championship: DNP
- U.S. Open: DNP
- The Open Championship: CUT: 1981

Robert James "Bobby" Lincoln (born 8 September 1953) is a South African professional golfer. He was a regular winner on the Southern African Tour from 1985 to 2000 and now plays on the European Seniors Tour.

== Professional career ==
Lincoln played on the European Tour in the late 1970s and early 1980s with little success. He was over thirty before he found success on his home tour by winning the 1985 Wild Coast Pro-Am. He went on to win three times in each of the following three years. He served on the Southern Africa Tour Players Committee from 1991 to 2006.

Lincoln joined the European Senior Tour in 2006 and claimed his first senior win in 2007 at the Jersey Seniors Classic.

== Professional wins (19) ==
=== Southern Africa Tour wins (6) ===
No.	Date	Tournament	Winning score	Margin of victory	Runner(s)-up
1	21 Nov 1987	Protea Assurance Classic	−17 (68-69-66-68=271)	1 stroke	(South Africa) Fulton Allem
2	27 Feb 1988	AECI Charity Classic	−17 (70-70-70-63=271)	2 strokes	(South Africa) John Bland
3	8 Feb 1992	Trustbank Tournament of Champions	−18 (69-63-68-70=270)	1 stroke	(South Africa) Ernie Els
4	8 Nov 1998	Platinum Classic	−14 (68-68-66=202)	3 strokes	(South Africa) Ashley Roestoff
5	12 Sep 1999	Bearing Man Highveld Classic	−7 (67-73-69=209)	Playoff	(South Africa) Darren Fichardt, (Zimbabwe) Lyall McNeill
6	31 Oct 1999	Platinum Classic (2)	−15 (69-63-69=201)	Playoff	(South Africa) Callie Swart

Southern Africa Tour playoff record (2–1)

No.	Year	Tournament	Opponent(s)	Result
1	1995	Amatola Sun Classic	(South Africa) Richard Kaplan, (South Africa) Sean Pappas	
2	1999	Bearing Man Highveld Classic	(South Africa) Darren Fichardt, (Zimbabwe) Lyall McNeill	Won with birdie on first extra hole
3	1999	Platinum Classic	(South Africa) Callie Swart	Won with birdie on third extra hole

=== Other South African wins (9) ===
- 1985 Wild Coast Pro-Am
- 1986 Wild Coast Pro-Am, Bethlehem Classic
- 1987 Wild Coast Pro-Am, Bethlehem Classic
- 1988 Bethlehem Classic, Ronnie Bass Pro-Am
- 1989 Zululand Classic
- 1992 Amatola Sun Classic

=== Other wins (3) ===
- 1986 Johnnie Walker Air Mauritius Golf Classic
- 2006 Nelson Mandela Invitational (with Retief Goosen)
- 2008 Gary Player Invitational (with Garth Mulroy)

=== European Seniors Tour wins (1) ===
No.	Date	Tournament	Winning score	Margin of victory	Runner-up
1	10 Jun 2007	Jersey Seniors Classic	−11 (71-67-67=205)	2 strokes	(Scotland) Bill Longmuir

== Results in major championships ==
Tournament	1981
The Open Championship	CUT

Note: Lincoln only played in The Open Championship.
CUT = missed the half-way cut
