= Richard Kaplan (golfer) =

South African professional golfer (born 1962)

Personal information
- Full name: Richard Dennis Kaplan
- Nationality: South Africa
- Born: 10 March 1962 (age 64) Johannesburg, South Africa
- Height: 1.86 m (6 ft 1 in)

Career
- Sport: Golf
- Turned professional: 1990
- Current tour: Sunshine Tour
- Former tour: Asian Tour
- Professional wins: 9

Number of wins by tour
- Asian Tour: 1
- Sunshine Tour: 4
- Other: 4

Richard Dennis Kaplan (born 10 March 1962) is a South African professional golfer who currently plays on the Sunshine Tour.

== Early life and amateur career ==
Kaplan was born in Johannesburg. He had a decorated amateur career during the 1980s which included winning the English Men's Open Amateur Stroke Play Championship (Brabazon Trophy) in 1986 and the Southern Transvaal Open Strokeplay in 1984. He also earned his Springbok colors four times.

== Professional career ==
In 1986, Kaplan turned professional. He won for the first time on the Sunshine Tour in 1995. He added three more tour wins between then and 2000. His best year-end finish on the Order of Merit was 9th in 1993, 1994 and 1995.

Kaplan has also competed on the Asian Tour where, in 1996, he won the Royal Thai Classic and finished in the top 20 on the Order of Merit.

== Personal life ==
Kaplan currently lives in Sandton, Johannesburg with his wife and two children.

== Amateur wins ==
- 1984 Southern Transvaal Open Strokeplay
- 1986 English Men's Open Amateur Stroke Play Championship

== Professional wins (9) ==
=== Asian PGA Tour wins (1) ===
| No. | Date | Tournament | Winning score | Margin of victory | Runner-up |
|---|---|---|---|---|---|
| 1 | 8 Dec 1996 | Royal Thai Classic | −17 (65-70-69-67=271) | Playoff | (South Africa) Nico van Rensburg |

Asian PGA Tour playoff record (1–0)

| No. | Year | Tournament | Opponent | Result |
|---|---|---|---|---|
| 1 | 1996 | Royal Thai Classic | (South Africa) Nico van Rensburg | Won with birdie on first extra hole |

=== Sunshine Tour wins (4) ===
| No. | Date | Tournament | Winning score | Margin of victory | Runner(s)-up |
|---|---|---|---|---|---|
| 1 | 7 May 1995 | Amatola Sun Classic | −6 (68-70-72=210) | Playoff | (South Africa) Bobby Lincoln, (South Africa) Sean Pappas |
| 2 | 30 Sep 1995 | FNB Pro Series (Western Cape) | −2 (72-70-72=214) | 2 strokes | (South Africa) Sammy Daniels, (South Africa) Ashley Roestoff |
| 3 | 3 Mar 1996 | Hollard Royal Swazi Sun Classic | −17 (66-67-70-68=271) | Playoff | (South Africa) Wayne Westner |
| 4 | 1 Apr 2000 | FNB Botswana Open | −10 (71-67-65=203) | 1 stroke | (South Africa) Callie Swart |

Sunshine Tour playoff record (2–1)

| No. | Year | Tournament | Opponent(s) | Result |
|---|---|---|---|---|
| 1 | 1995 | Amatola Sun Classic | (South Africa) Bobby Lincoln, (South Africa) Sean Pappas | |
| 2 | 1996 | Hollard Royal Swazi Sun Classic | (South Africa) Wayne Westner | |
| 3 | 1998 | FNB Botswana Open | (South Africa) Justin Hobday | Lost to birdie on first extra hole |

=== Other wins (4) ===
- 1989 (1) Pietersburg Classic
- 1990 (2) Pietermaritzburg, Nissan Challenge
- 1991 (1) Pietersburg Classic

== Results in World Golf Championships ==
| Tournament | 1999 |
|---|---|
| Match Play | |
| Championship | 61 |
| Invitational | |

Did not play

== Team appearances ==
- World Cup (representing South Africa): 1999
