= Chris Williams (South African golfer) =

English golfer (born 1959)

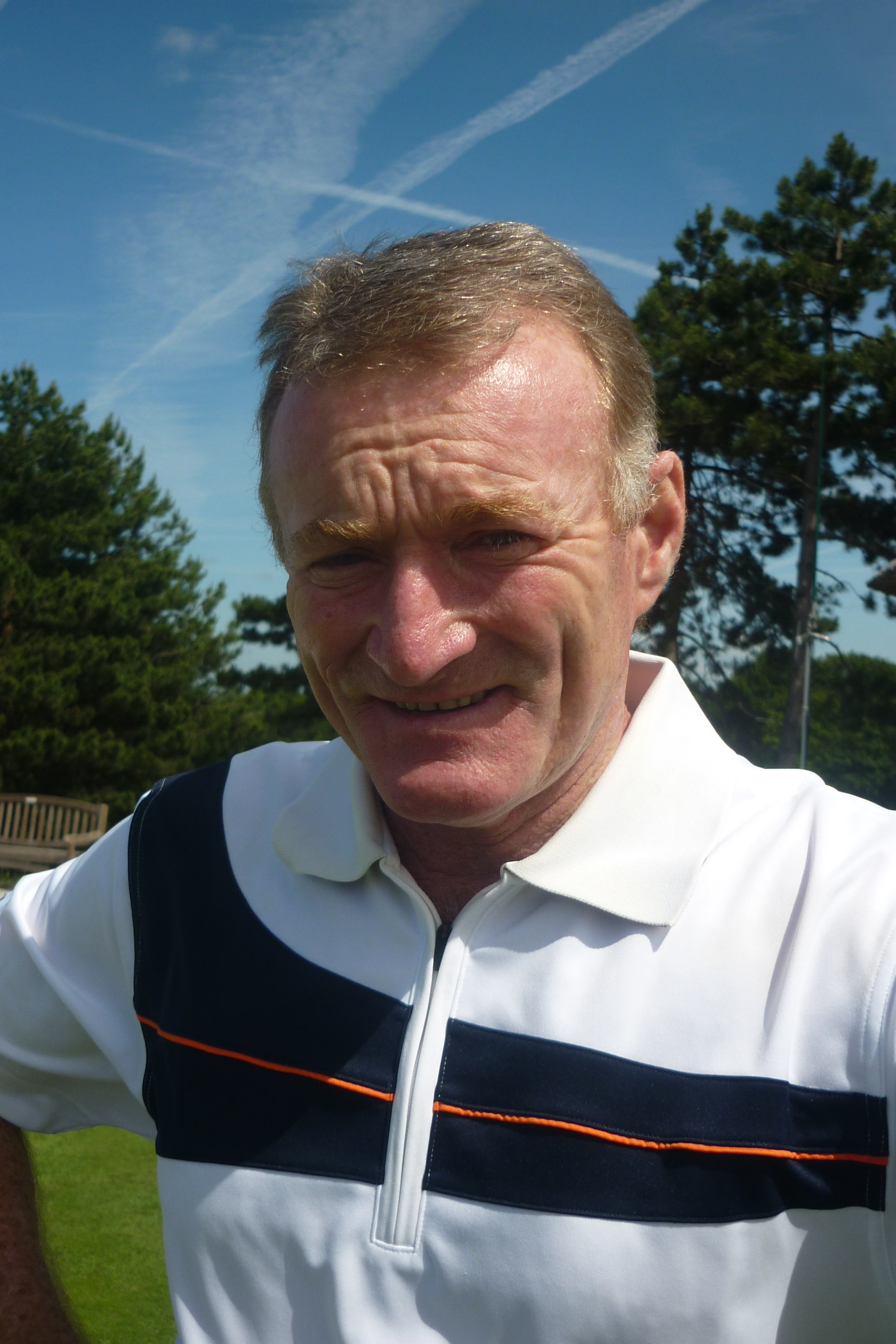

Personal information
- Full name: Christopher Gary Williams
- Nickname: The Ginger Cat
- Nationality: England; South Africa
- Born: 20 March 1959 (age 67) Bebington, Cheshire, England
- Height: 1.78 m (5 ft 10 in)
- Weight: 78 kg (172 lb; 12.3 st)

Career
- Sport: Golf
- Turned professional: 1978
- Current tour: European Senior Tour
- Former tours: European Tour; Asian Tour; Sunshine Tour; Champions Tour
- Professional wins: 17

Number of wins by tour
- Asian Tour: 2
- Sunshine Tour: 7
- European Senior Tour: 3
- Other: 5

Achievements and awards
- Asian PGA Tour Players' Player of the Year: 1998

Christopher Gary Williams (born 20 March 1959) is an English-born golfer who currently lives in South Africa. Williams has won seven times on the Sunshine Tour.

== Early life ==
Williams was born in Liverpool, England. He moved to Johannesburg, South Africa in his late teens.

== Professional career ==
In 1978, Williams turned professional, shortly after moving to South Africa. He joined the Southern Africa Tour in 1985, and won his first title, the Lexington PGA Championship, during his debut season. He has won six more events on the Sunshine Tour since then.

Williams joined the European Senior Tour on turning 50, having secured conditional playing rights at the 2008 qualifying school. He won for the first time as a senior in March 2011 at the Aberdeen Brunei Senior Masters.

== Amateur wins ==
- 1977/78 Junior Springbok

== Professional wins (17) ==
=== Asian PGA Tour wins (2) ===
| No. | Date | Tournament | Winning score | Margin of victory | Runner(s)-up |
|---|---|---|---|---|---|
| 1 | 16 Aug 1998 | Volvo Masters of Malaysia | −9 (71-68-71-69=279) | Playoff | (Myanmar) Zaw Moe, (Australia) Adrian Percey |
| 2 | 25 Oct 1998 | FedEx PGA Championship | −11 (70-66-69-72=277) | 1 stroke | (United States) Ted Purdy |

Asian PGA Tour playoff record (1–0)

| No. | Year | Tournament | Opponents | Result |
|---|---|---|---|---|
| 1 | 1998 | Volvo Masters of Malaysia | (Myanmar) Zaw Moe, (Australia) Adrian Percey | Won with birdie on fourth extra hole Percey eliminated by par on first hole |

=== Sunshine Tour wins (7) ===
| No. | Date | Tournament | Winning score | Margin of victory | Runner(s)-up |
|---|---|---|---|---|---|
| 1 | 19 Jan 1985 | Lexington PGA Championship | −8 (71-70-63-68=272) | 1 stroke | (Zimbabwe) Mark McNulty, (United States) Jay Townsend, (Zimbabwe) Denis Watson |
| 2 | 14 Jan 1989 | ICL International | −16 (64-68-69-71=272) | 1 stroke | (United States) J. C. Anderson |
| 3 | 20 Nov 1994 | Zimbabwe Open | −16 (65-68-70-69=272) | Playoff | (United States) Andrew Pitts |
| 4 | 6 Jun 1996 | FNB Pro Series (Swaziland) | −12 (70-66-68=204) | 2 strokes | (South Africa) Michael Green |
| 5 | 30 Nov 1996 | Leopard Rock Classic | −6 (72-68-67=207) | 1 stroke | (Brazil) Adilson da Silva |
| 6 | 27 Jan 2002 | Telkom PGA Championship (2) | −17 (74-64-65-68=271) | 2 strokes | (South Africa) Hennie Otto |
| 7 | 4 Oct 2003 | Seekers Travel Pro-Am | −13 (71-67-65=203) | Playoff | (Zimbabwe) Jason Jackson, (South Africa) Ashley Roestoff |

Sunshine Tour playoff record (2–2)

| No. | Year | Tournament | Opponent(s) | Result |
|---|---|---|---|---|
| 1 | 1989 | Lexington PGA Championship | (Zimbabwe) Tony Johnstone | Lost to birdie on first extra hole |
| 2 | 1994 | Zimbabwe Open | (United States) Andrew Pitts | Won with birdie on first extra hole |
| 3 | 2002 | Vodacom Golf Classic | (South Africa) Ashley Roestoff | Lost to eagle on first extra hole |
| 4 | 2003 | Seekers Travel Pro-Am | (Zimbabwe) Jason Jackson, (South Africa) Ashley Roestoff | |

=== Other wins (5) ===
- 1983 Telkom Open (South Africa)
- 1985 Swaziland Open
- 1991 PX Celebrity Pro-Am (with Justin Hobday), Telephone Manufacturers SA Trophy
- 2007 Royal Swazi Sun Touring Pro-Am (non-Order of Merit event on the Sunshine Tour)

=== European Senior Tour wins (3) ===
| No. | Date | Tournament | Winning score | Margin of victory | Runner-up |
|---|---|---|---|---|---|
| 1 | 6 Mar 2011 | Aberdeen Brunei Senior Masters | −12 (68-69-64=201) | 1 stroke | (South Korea) Choi Sang-ho |
| 2 | 18 Mar 2017 | Sharjah Senior Golf Masters | −13 (65-70-68=203) | Playoff | (England) Gary Marks |
| 3 | 20 Jun 2021 | Farmfoods European Legends Links Championship | −9 (69-68-70=207) | 3 strokes | (Wales) Phillip Price |

European Senior Tour playoff record (1–0)

| No. | Year | Tournament | Opponent | Result |
|---|---|---|---|---|
| 1 | 2017 | Sharjah Senior Golf Masters | (England) Gary Marks | Won with par on first extra hole |
