= Ashley Roestoff =

South African professional golfer (born 1963)

Personal information
- Full name: Ashley Trevor Roestoff
- Nationality: South Africa
- Born: 27 August 1963 (age 63) Johannesburg, South Africa
- Height: 1.75 m (5 ft 9 in)
- Weight: 74 kg (163 lb; 11.7 st)
- Children: 2

Career
- Sport: Golf
- College: Oral Roberts University
- Turned professional: 1987
- Former tours: Sunshine Tour; Challenge Tour
- Professional wins: 12

Number of wins by tour
- Sunshine Tour: 7
- Challenge Tour: 1
- Other: 4

Ashley Trevor Roestoff (born 27 August 1963) is a South African professional golfer. He played on the Sunshine Tour, where he found success, winning seven tournaments between 1995 and 2002.

== Early life and amateur career ==
In 1963, Roestoff was born in Johannesburg, South Africa. He attended Oral Roberts University in Tulsa, Oklahoma. In 1987, he won all his single matches at the Interprovincial Championship in South Africa.

== Professional career ==
In 1987, Roestoff turned professional. In 1992, he joined the Sunshine Tour and won his first title that same year at the Fish River Sun Classic. He has found most of his success on the Winter Swing of the tour where he has collected a total of 10 tournament victories.

In addition to the Sunshine Tour, Roestoff played one season on the second tier European Challenge Tour in 2001, finishing 26th on the final standings having picked up one win, at the Tusker Kenya Open.

Currently he is teaching at Parkview Golf Course and Jackal's Creek Golf Estate.

== Personal life ==
Roestoff lives in Randburg with his wife, Letitia and his sons, Travis and Connor.

== Professional wins (12) ==
=== Sunshine Tour wins (7) ===
No.	Date	Tournament	Winning score	Margin of victory	Runner-up
1	22 Jan 1995	ICL International	−13 (66-70-69-70=275)	4 strokes	(United States) Michael Christie, (South Africa) Kevin Stone
2	29 Oct 1995	Lombard Tyres Classic	−11 (68-69-73-67=277)	Playoff	(England) Chris Davison
3	1 Nov 1996	Trustbank Gauteng Classic	−9 (66-70-71=207)	2 strokes	(South Africa) Gavan Levenson
4	8 Aug 1998	Fish River Sun Pro-Am	−3 (75-70-68=213)	4 strokes	(South Africa) Colin Sorour
5	25 Oct 1998	FNB Namibia Open	−10 (69-68-66=203)	3 strokes	(South Africa) Sammy Daniels, (South Africa) Bobby Lincoln
6	15 May 1999	Vodacom Series (Eastern Cape)	−11 (68-68-69=205)	1 stroke	(South Africa) Justin Hobday, (Scotland) Alan McLean
7	28 Sep 2002	Vodacom Golf Classic	−11 (67-67-71=205)	Playoff	(South Africa) Chris Williams

Sunshine Tour playoff record (2–1)

No.	Year	Tournament	Opponent(s)	Result
1	1995	Lombard Tyres Classic	(England) Chris Davison	
2	2002	Vodacom Golf Classic	(South Africa) Chris Williams	Won with eagle on first extra hole
3	2003	Seekers Travel Pro-Am	(Zimbabwe) Jason Jackson, (South Africa) Chris Williams	

=== Challenge Tour wins (1) ===
No.	Date	Tournament	Winning score	Margin of victory	Runner-up
1	4 Mar 2001	Tusker Kenya Open	−13 (73-65-68-65=271)	Playoff	(England) Andrew Sherborne

Challenge Tour playoff record (1–0)

No.	Year	Tournament	Opponent	Result
1	2001	Tusker Kenya Open	(England) Andrew Sherborne	Won with birdie on first extra hole

=== Other wins (4) ===
- 1992 Fish River Sun Classic
- 1993 Caribbean Estates West Coast Classic
- 1994 Amatola Sun Classic
- 2009 Klipdrift Gold Sun International Touring Pro-Am
