= Bushveld Classic =

The Bushveld Classic was a golf tournament that was formerly played in the Sunshine Tour. The list of winners starts from 1991, but there may have been more past playings of the event.

== Winners ==
- 1997 (South Africa) Desvonde Botes
- 1996 (South Africa) James Kingston
- 1995 (South Africa) Kevin Stone
- 1994 (South Africa) Don Gammon
- 1993 (South Africa) Kevin Stone
- 1992 (South Africa) Retief Goosen
- 1991 (South Africa) John Mashego
