= James Kingston =

South African professional golfer (born 1965)

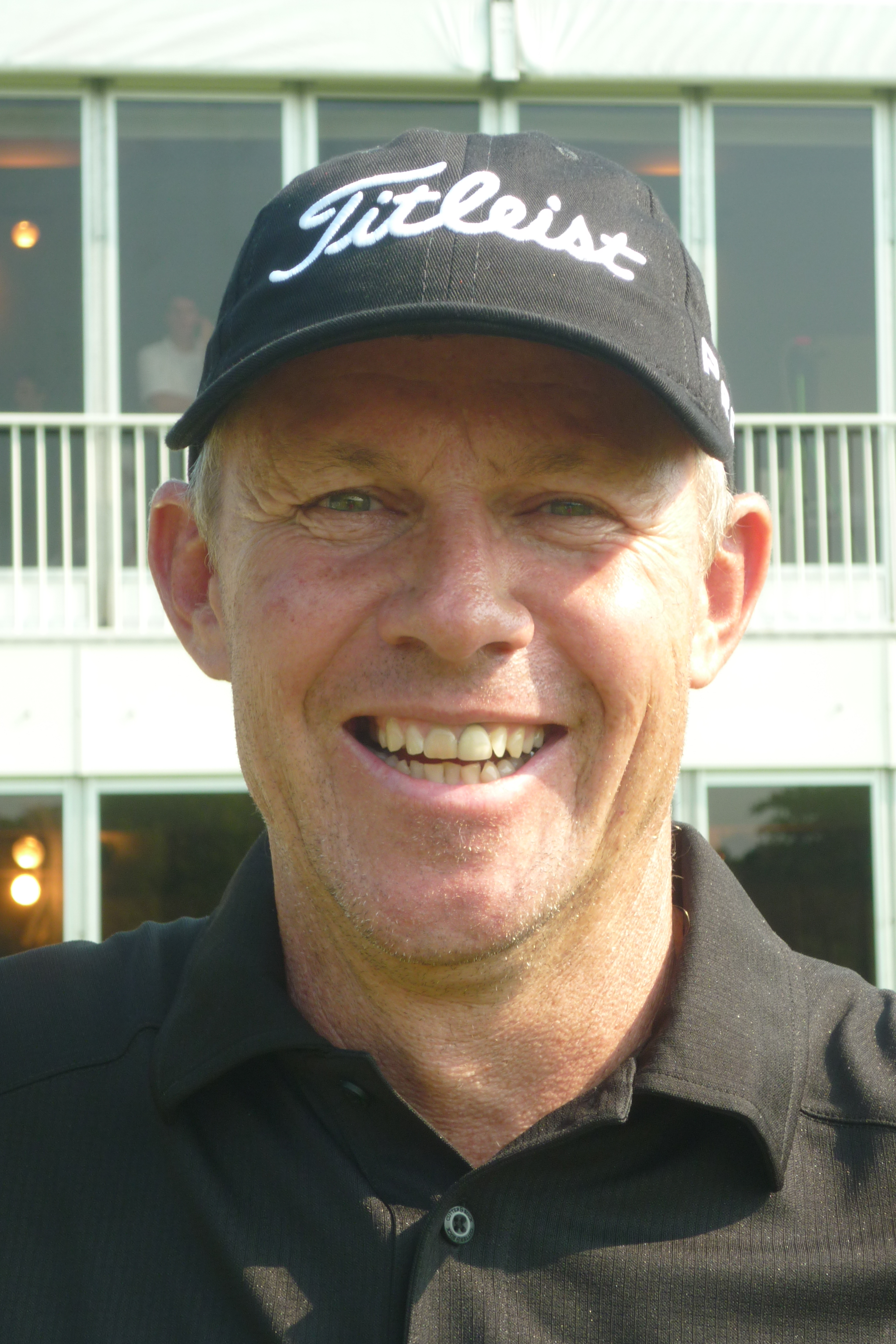

Personal information
- Full name: James Hubert Kingston
- Nationality: South Africa
- Born: 30 November 1965 (age 60) Ottosdal, South Africa
- Height: 1.83 m (6 ft 0 in)

Career
- Sport: Golf
- Turned professional: 1988
- Current tour: European Senior Tour
- Former tours: European Tour; Asian Tour; Sunshine Tour
- Professional wins: 22
- Highest ranking: 65 (19 October 2008)

Number of wins by tour
- European Tour: 2
- Asian Tour: 4
- Sunshine Tour: 10
- European Senior Tour: 4
- Other: 3

Best results in major championships
- Masters Tournament: DNP
- PGA Championship: T55: 2008
- U.S. Open: DNP
- The Open Championship: T27: 2009

Achievements and awards
- Sunshine Tour Order of Merit Winner: 2007
- European Senior Tour Order of Merit Winner: 2022

James Hubert Kingston (born 30 November 1965) is a South African professional golfer.

== Career ==
Kingston was born in Ottosdal, South Africa. He turned professional in 1988, and is currently a member of the European Tour and the Sunshine Tour. He has also competed on the Asian Tour, where he collected four tournament victories.

In 2007, Kingston finished top of the Order of Merit on the Sunshine Tour, aided by his victory at the European Tour co-sanctioned South African Airways Open. That win was his first on the European Tour, and helped him to his best Order of Merit finish of 17th in 2008.

Victory at the Sunshine Tour's Vodacom Championship in February 2008, lifted Kingston into the top 100 of the Official World Golf Rankings for the first time.

Kingston secured his first win of 2009 with a playoff triumph against Anders Hansen at the 2009 Mercedes-Benz Championship in Cologne.

== Professional wins (22) ==
=== European Tour wins (2) ===
No.	Date	Tournament	Winning score	Margin of victory	Runner-up
1	16 Dec 2007 (2008 season)	South African Airways Open^{1}	−4 (73-69-71-71=284)	1 stroke	(England) Oliver Wilson
2	13 Sep 2009	Mercedes-Benz Championship	−13 (67-69-70-69=275)	Playoff	(Denmark) Anders Hansen

^{1}Co-sanctioned by the Sunshine Tour

European Tour playoff record (1–1)

No.	Year	Tournament	Opponent	Result
1	2003	Qatar Masters	(South Africa) Darren Fichardt	Lost to birdie on first extra hole
2	2009	Mercedes-Benz Championship	(Denmark) Anders Hansen	Won with par on first extra hole

=== Asian PGA Tour wins (4) ===
No.	Date	Tournament	Winning score	Margin of victory	Runner-up
1	15 Nov 1998	Thailand Open	−16 (69-64-69-70=272)	Playoff	(India) Jeev Milkha Singh
2	2 May 1999	Maekyung Daks Open^{1}	−11 (67-66-74-70=277)	Playoff	(Myanmar) Kyi Hla Han
3	27 Feb 2000	London Myanmar Open	−19 (64-71-67-67=269)	10 strokes	(South Africa) Craig Kamps
4	28 May 2000	Ericsson Classic	−16 (67-66-71-68=272)	5 strokes	(United States) Andrew Pitts

^{1}Co-sanctioned by the Korean Tour

Asian PGA Tour playoff record (2–0)

No.	Year	Tournament	Opponent	Result
1	1998	Thailand Open	(India) Jeev Milkha Singh	Won with par on first extra hole
2	1999	Maekyung Daks Open	(Myanmar) Kyi Hla Han	Won with birdie on fourth extra hole

=== Sunshine Tour wins (10) ===
Legend
Flagship events (1)
Other Sunshine Tour (9)

No.	Date	Tournament	Winning score	Margin of victory	Runner(s)-up
1	29 Jun 1995	FNB Pro Series (Royal Swazi)	−8 (70-68-70=208)	1 stroke	(South Africa) Kevin Stone
2	8 Nov 1995	FNB Pro Series (2) (Namibia Open)	−11 (64-70-68=202)	1 stroke	(South Africa) Michael du Toit
3	6 Jul 1996	Bosveld Classic	−7 (69-64-76=209)	2 strokes	(Eswatini) Paul Friedlander, (South Africa) Mark Murless
4	28 Sep 2001	Randfontein Classic	−11 (67-72-66=205)	Playoff	(South Africa) André Cruse, (South Africa) Sean Ludgater
5	12 Oct 2001	Atlantic Beach Classic	−3 (72-69-72=213)	7 strokes	(South Africa) Wallie Coetsee, (South Africa) Justin Hobday
6	19 May 2002	Royal Swazi Sun Classic	−12 (70-70-64=204)	1 stroke	(South Africa) Keith Horne, (South Africa) Bobby Lincoln
7	16 Dec 2007	South African Airways Open^{1}	−4 (73-69-71-71=284)	1 stroke	(England) Oliver Wilson
8	17 Feb 2008	Vodacom Championship	−17 (71-67-68-65=271)	2 strokes	(Brazil) Adilson da Silva
9	20 Aug 2010	Vodacom Origins of Golf at Selborne	−13 (66-65-72=203)	2 strokes	(Brazil) Adilson da Silva
10	5 May 2013	Investec Royal Swazi Open	45 pts (10-9-17-9=45)	Playoff	(South Africa) Ruan de Smidt

^{1}Co-sanctioned by the European Tour

Sunshine Tour playoff record (2–0)

No.	Year	Tournament	Opponent(s)	Result
1	2001	Randfontein Classic	(South Africa) André Cruse, (South Africa) Sean Ludgater	
2	2013	Investec Royal Swazi Open	(South Africa) Ruan de Smidt	Won with par on second extra hole

=== Other wins (2) ===
No.	Date	Tournament	Winning score	Margin of victory	Runner-up
1	12 Sep 1992	Lombard Tyres TVL Classic	−12 (64-67-73=204)	4 strokes	(South Africa) John Fourie
2	22 Jul 1999	Wild Coast Sun Pro-Am	−12 (67-64-67=198)	2 strokes	(South Africa) Brett Liddle

=== European Senior Tour wins (4) ===
No.	Date	Tournament	Winning score	Margin of victory	Runner(s)-up
1	5 Nov 2021	Sergio Melpignano Senior Italian Open	−11 (70-67-68=205)	1 stroke	(Sweden) Joakim Haeggman
2	10 Jul 2022	Swiss Seniors Open	−11 (68-63-68=199)	3 strokes	(Wales) Phillip Price, (England) David Shacklady
3	28 Oct 2023	Sergio Melpignano Senior Italian Open (2)	−16 (69-70-61=200)	1 stroke	(England) Peter Baker, (Brazil) Adilson da Silva
4	17 May 2025	OFX Irish Legends	−12 (66-72-66=204)	1 stroke	(England) Peter Baker, (South Africa) Darren Fichardt, (South Africa) Keith Horne

=== Other senior wins (1) ===
No.	Date	Tournament	Winning score	Margin of victory	Runner-up
1	16 Jul 2021	WINSTONgolf Senior Open Invitational	−7 (72-65=137)	4 strokes	(England) Paul Streeter

== Results in major championships ==
Tournament	2002	2003	2004	2005	2006	2007	2008	2009
The Open Championship	CUT		T57				CUT	T27
PGA Championship							T55	

Note: Kingston never played in the Masters Tournament or the U.S. Open.

Did not play

CUT = missed the half-way cut
"T" = tied

== Results in World Golf Championships ==
Tournament	2008	2009	2010
Match Play			
Championship	T70	T20	
Invitational	78		T63
Champions		T33	

Did not play

"T" = Tied
Note that the HSBC Champions did not become a WGC event until 2009.
