= Justin Hobday =

South African professional golfer

Personal information
- Full name: Justin Richard Hobday
- Nationality: South Africa
- Born: 12 August 1963 (age 63) Bishops Stortford, England
- Height: 1.85 m (6 ft 1 in)
- Weight: 90 kg (200 lb; 14 st)

Career
- Sport: Golf
- Turned professional: 1985
- Current tour: Sunshine Tour
- Former tour: European Tour
- Professional wins: 13

Number of wins by tour
- Sunshine Tour: 6
- Other: 7

Best results in major championships
- Masters Tournament: DNP
- PGA Championship: DNP
- U.S. Open: DNP
- The Open Championship: CUT: 1992

Achievements and awards
- Southern Africa Tour Rookie of the Year: 1986

Justin Richard Hobday (born 12 August 1963) is a South African professional golfer who has won eleven official money events on the Sunshine Tour.

== Career ==
Hobday was born in Bishops Stortford, Hertfordshire, England, and is the nephew of golfer Simon Hobday, twice winner on the European Tour.

Hobday turned professional in 1985 and joined the Southern Africa Tour, now the Sunshine Tour. He was awarded the Bobby Locke Trophy as the Rookie of the Year in 1986, and went on to win his first event in 1989. He would win ten more tournaments official money events on the tour between then and 2001.

Between 1987 and 2002, Hobday competed also on the European Tour, where he had a best finish of 92nd place on the Order of Merit in 1992, with a tournament best of third in the Peugeot Spanish Open that same year.

== Awards and honors ==
In 1986, Hobday earned the Southern Africa Tour Rookie of the Year honors

== Amateur highlights ==
- 1983/84 Earned Amateur Springbok Colours 4 times
- 1984/85 Member of SA amateur team

== Professional wins (13) ==
=== Sunshine Tour wins (6) ===
No.	Date	Tournament	Winning score	Margin of victory	Runner(s)-up
1	21 Dec 1991	Goodyear Classic	−8 (71-71-69-69=280)	4 strokes	(United States) Hugh Royer III
2	7 Oct 1995	FNB Pro Series (Free State)	−8 (69-70-69=208)	2 strokes	(South Africa) Derek James, (South Africa) Jannie Legrange
3	28 Sep 1996	IDC Development Tourism Classic	−10 (71-65-70=206)	2 strokes	(South Africa) James Kingston, (South Africa) Michael Scholz
4	15 Aug 1998	Royal Swazi Sun Classic	−9 (70-68-69=207)	3 strokes	(South Africa) Titch Moore
5	26 Sep 1998	FNB Botswana Open	−12 (66-67-68=201)	Playoff	(South Africa) Richard Kaplan
6	7 Oct 2001	Bearing Man Highveld Classic	−13 (69-69-65=203)	Playoff	(Zimbabwe) Marc Cayeux

Sunshine Tour playoff record (2–0)

No.	Year	Tournament	Opponent	Result
1	1998	FNB Botswana Open	(South Africa) Richard Kaplan	Won with birdie on first extra hole
2	2001	Bearing Man Highveld Classic	(Zimbabwe) Marc Cayeux	Won with par on second extra hole

=== Other Southern Africa wins (7) ===
- 1989 Lombard Tyres Classic
- 1991 PX Celebrity Pro-Am (tied with Chris Williams), Chipkin Catering Supply Sun City Pro-Am (tied with Des Terblanche)
- 1993 Spoornet Classic, Sun City Classic
- 1995 Bloemfontein Classic
- 1999 Royal Swazi Sun Touring Pros Pro-Am

== See also ==
- List of African golfers
