= 2008 Canadian Tour =

Golf tour season

2008 Canadian Tour season
- Duration: April 9, 2008 – September 7, 2008
- Number of official events: 15
- Most wins: (United States) John Ellis (3)
- Order of Merit: (United States) John Ellis

The 2008 Canadian Tour was the 23rd season of the Canadian Tour, the main professional golf tour in Canada since it was formed in 1986.

== Schedule ==
The following table lists official events during the 2008 season.

Date	Tournament	Location	Purse (C$)	Winner (Note: The number in parentheses after each winner's name is the number of Canadian Tour events they had won up to and including that tournament.)	OWGR points
Apr 13	Spring International	United States	US$100,000	(United States) Spencer Levin (3)	6
Apr 20	Stockton Sports Commission Classic	United States	US$100,000	(United States) John Ellis (1)	6
Apr 27	Corona Mazatlán Mexican PGA Championship	Mexico	US$125,000	(United States) John Ellis (2)	6
May 18	Iberostar Riviera Maya Open	Mexico	US$125,000	(United States) Daniel Im (1)	6
May 25	La Loma San Luis Potosi Open	Mexico	US$125,000	(United States) Russell Surber (1)	6
Jun 15	Times Colonist Open	British Columbia	150,000	(United States) Daniel Im (2)	6
Jun 22	Greater Vancouver Charity Classic	British Columbia	100,000	(Canada) Adam Speirs (1)	6
Jun 29	ATB Financial Classic	Alberta	150,000	(Canada) Dustin Risdon (2)	6
Jul 6	Saskatchewan Open	Saskatchewan	150,000	(New Zealand) Josh Geary (1)	6
Jul 13	Telus Edmonton Open	Alberta	150,000	(United States) John Ellis (3)	6
Jul 20	Canadian Tour Players Cup	Manitoba	200,000	(Canada) Wes Heffernan (4)	6
Aug 17	Desjardins Montreal Open	Montreal	200,000	(Canada) Graham DeLaet (1)	6
Aug 24	Jane Rogers Championship of Mississauga	Ontario	125,000	(United States) Alex Coe (1)	6
Aug 31	Seaforth Country Classic	Ontario	150,000	(Canada) Kent Eger (1)	6
Sep 7	Canadian Tour Championship	Ontario	235,000	(United States) Tom Stankowski (1)	6

== Order of Merit ==
The Order of Merit was based on prize money won during the season, calculated in Canadian dollars.

Position	Player	Prize money (C$)
1	(United States) John Ellis	113,315
2	(Canada) Wes Heffernan	96,154
3	(United States) Daniel Im	82,954
4	(Canada) Graham DeLaet	66,066
5	(United States) George Bradford	62,405
