= 2009 Canadian Tour =

Golf tour season

2009 Canadian Tour season
- Duration: November 27, 2008 – October 4, 2009
- Number of official events: 16
- Most wins: (Canada) Graham DeLaet (2) (United States) James Hahn (2) (Argentina) Rafael Gómez (2) (Argentina) Mauricio Molina (2)
- Order of Merit: (Canada) Graham DeLaet

The 2009 Canadian Tour was the 24th season of the Canadian Tour, the main professional golf tour in Canada since it was formed in 1986.

== Schedule ==
The following table lists official events during the 2009 season.

Date	Tournament	Location	Purse (C$)	Winner (Note: The number in parentheses after each winner's name is the number of Canadian Tour events they had won up to and including that tournament.)	OWGR points	Other tours (Note: TLA − Tour de las Américas; TPG − TPG Tour.)
Nov 30	Sport Frances Open	Chile	US$160,000	(Argentina) Rafael Gómez (1)	6	TLA
Dec 7	Torneo de Maestros	Argentina	US$140,000	(Argentina) Fabián Gómez (n/a)	14	TLA, TPG
Dec 14	Costa Rica Classic	Costa Rica	US$125,000	(Argentina) Mauricio Molina (1)	6	TLA
Apr 20	Corona Mazatlán Mexican PGA Championship	Mexico	US$125,000	(Argentina) Mauricio Molina (2)	6	
Jun 7	Times Colonist Open	British Columbia	200,000	(United States) Byron Smith (3)	6	
Jun 14	City of Surrey Invitational	British Columbia	150,000	(United States) Mike Grob (6)	6	
Jun 28	ATB Financial Classic	Alberta	150,000	(Canada) Graham DeLaet (2)	6	
Jul 5	Telus Edmonton Open	Alberta	150,000	(United States) James Hahn (1)	6	
Jul 12	Saskatchewan Open	Saskatchewan	150,000	(United States) Andres Gonzales (1)	6	
Jul 19	Canadian Tour Players Cup	Manitoba	200,000	(Canada) Graham DeLaet (3)	6	
Aug 9	Roxul Jane Rogers Championship	Ontario	125,000	(Canada) Ryan Yip (1)	6	
Aug 23	Desjardins Montreal Open	Quebec	200,000	(Canada) Stuart Anderson (3)	6	
Aug 30	Seaforth Country Classic	Ontario	125,000	(United States) Brian Unk (2)	6	
Sep 6	Canadian Tour Championship	Ontario	250,000	(Canada) James Love (1)	6	
Sep 27; ~~May 24~~	Iberostar Riviera Maya Open	Mexico	US$100,000	(Argentina) Rafael Gómez (2)	6	
Oct 4; ~~May 31~~	Riviera Nayarit Classic	Mexico	US$125,000	(United States) James Hahn (2)	6	

== Order of Merit ==
The Order of Merit was based on prize money won during the season, calculated in Canadian dollars.

Position	Player	Prize money (C$)
1	(Canada) Graham DeLaet	94,579
2	(United States) Byron Smith	73,843
3	(United States) James Hahn	73,417
4	(Argentina) Mauricio Molina	61,601
5	(Canada) Stuart Anderson	61,521
