= 2010 Canadian Tour =

Golf tour season

2010 Canadian Tour season
- Duration: February 18, 2010 – November 7, 2010
- Number of official events: 11
- Most wins: (United States) Aaron Goldberg (3)
- Order of Merit: (United States) Aaron Goldberg

The 2010 Canadian Tour was the 25th season of the Canadian Tour, the main professional golf tour in Canada since it was formed in 1986.

== Schedule ==
The following table lists official events during the 2010 season.

Date	Tournament	Location	Purse (C$)	Winner (Note: The number in parentheses after each winner's name is the number of Canadian Tour events they had won up to and including that tournament.)	OWGR points	Other tours (Note: CHA − Challenge Tour; TLA − Tour de las Américas.)
Feb 21	Abierto Internacional de Golf II Copa Antioquia	Colombia	US$220,000	(Colombia) David Vanegas (1)	12	CHA, TLA
Apr 18	Corona Mazatlán Mexican PGA Championship	Mexico	US$125,000	(United States) Andy Matthews (1)	6	
Apr 25	Riviera Nayarit Classic	Mexico	US$125,000	(United States) Rob Grube (1)	6	
Jun 6	Times Colonist Open	British Columbia	250,000	(United States) Brock Mackenzie (1)	6	
Jul 4	ATB Financial Classic	Alberta	250,000	(Canada) Dustin Risdon (3)	6	
Jul 11	Dakota Dunes Casino Open	Saskatchewan	250,000	(United States) Will Wilcox (1)	6	
Jul 18	Canadian Tour Players Cup	Manitoba	300,000	(United States) Aaron Goldberg (1)	6	
Aug 15	Clublink Jane Rogers Championship	Ontario	125,000	(United States) Aaron Goldberg (2)	6	
Aug 22	Economical Insurance Group Seaforth Country Classic	Ontario	125,000	(Canada) Kent Eger (2)	6	
Aug 29	Canadian Tour Championship	Ontario	325,000	(United States) Aaron Goldberg (3)	6	
Nov 7	Desert Dunes Classic	United States	150,000	(Canada) Adam Hadwin (1)	6	

== Order of Merit ==
The Order of Merit was based on prize money won during the season, calculated in Canadian dollars.

Position	Player	Prize money (C$)
1	(United States) Aaron Goldberg	156,119
2	(Canada) Adam Hadwin	88,898
3	(United States) Brock Mackenzie	65,868
4	(United States) Will Wilcox	52,255
5	(United States) Rob Grube	50,036
