= 2007 Canadian Tour =

Golf tour season

2007 Canadian Tour season
- Duration: April 12, 2007 – September 2, 2007
- Number of official events: 14
- Most wins: (Australia) Adam Bland (2) (Canada) Wes Heffernan (2) (United States) Spencer Levin (2) (United States) Byron Smith (2)
- Order of Merit: (United States) Byron Smith

The 2007 Canadian Tour was the 22nd season of the Canadian Tour, the main professional golf tour in Canada since it was formed in 1986.

== Schedule ==
The following table lists official events during the 2007 season.

Date	Tournament	Location	Purse (C$)	Winner (Note: The number in parentheses after each winner's name is the number of Canadian Tour events they had won up to and including that tournament.)	OWGR points
Apr 15	San Jose International Open	United States	US$100,000	(Australia) Adam Bland (1)	6
Apr 22	Northern California Classic	United States	125,000	(Canada) Wes Heffernan (2)	6
Apr 29	Corona Mazatlán Classic	Mexico	125,000	(United States) Byron Smith (1)	6
May 6	Ford Culiacan Open	Mexico	US$125,000	(Australia) Adam Bland (2)	6
May 13	Riviera Nayarit Classic	Mexico	US$125,000	(Canada) Wes Heffernan (3)	6
May 20	Iberostar Riviera Maya Open	Mexico	125,000	(United States) Spencer Levin (1)	6
Jun 17	Times Colonist Open	British Columbia	150,000	(United States) Spencer Levin (2)	6
Jun 24	Greater Vancouver Charity Classic	British Columbia	100,000	(Canada) James Lepp (2)	6
Jul 1	ATB Financial Classic	Alberta	150,000	(United States) Mike Grob (5)	6
Jul 8	Telus Edmonton Open	Alberta	150,000	(Canada) Dustin Risdon (1)	6
Jul 15	Free Press Manitoba Classic	Manitoba	150,000	(Canada) Mike Mezei (1)	6
Aug 19	Desjardins Montreal Open	Quebec	200,000	(United States) Brent Schwarzrock (1)	6
Aug 26	Jane Rogers Championship of Mississauga	Ontario	125,000	(United States) Byron Smith (2)	6
Sep 2	Canadian Tour Championship	Ontario	200,000	(United States) Bret Guetz (1)	6

== Order of Merit ==
The Order of Merit was based on prize money won during the season, calculated in Canadian dollars.

Position	Player	Prize money (C$)
1	(United States) Byron Smith	91,202
2	(United States) Spencer Levin	88,749
3	(Canada) Derek Gillespie	64,209
4	(Australia) Adam Bland	63,233
5	(Canada) Wes Heffernan	61,412
