= Graham DeLaet =

Canadian professional golfer (born 1982)

Personal information
- Full name: Graham Norman DeLaet
- Nationality: Canada
- Born: 22 January 1982 (age 44) Weyburn, Saskatchewan, Canada
- Height: 5 ft 11 in (1.80 m)
- Weight: 165 lb (75 kg; 11.8 st)
- Spouse: Ruby DeLaet (m. 2008)

Career
- Sport: Golf
- College: Boise State University
- Turned professional: 2007
- Former tours: PGA Tour; Sunshine Tour; Canadian Tour
- Professional wins: 4
- Highest ranking: 26 (February 2, 2014)

Number of wins by tour
- Sunshine Tour: 1
- Other: 3

Best results in major championships
- Masters Tournament: CUT: 2014
- PGA Championship: T7: 2017
- U.S. Open: CUT: 2014
- The Open Championship: T68: 2015

Achievements and awards
- Canadian Tour Order of Merit winner: 2009
- Sunshine Tour Rookie of the Year: 2009

Graham Norman DeLaet (born 22 January 1982) is a former Canadian professional golfer who played on the PGA Tour. He currently works as a golf analyst for The Sports Network (TSN) in Canada.

== Early life and amateur career ==
DeLaet was born in Weyburn, Saskatchewan and grew up there and in Moose Jaw. He attended Boise State University where he won ten collegiate tournaments. He was on the Canadian development golf team, organized by the RCGA, from 2005 to 2006, and credited this experience with improving his game. DeLaet finished 2nd as an amateur in the 2005 Edmonton Open, a Canadian Tour event.

== Professional career ==
=== Canadian Tour ===
In 2007, DeLaet turned professional and played on the Canadian Tour that year. In his 2007 rookie season he made 11 of 14 cuts with seven top-10 finishes. He was awarded the Bob Beauchemin Shield as the Canadian Rookie of the Year.

He got off to a slow start in 2008, in which he missed the cut in five of his first eight events. However, he earned his first victory as a professional in his ninth start of the season at the Desjardins Montreal Open in a playoff, earning the first place prize of $32,000. He followed this up with a 2nd-place finish at the Jane Rogers Championship the following week and finished tied for 2nd at the season ending Tour Championship.

2009 was a successful season for DeLaet in which he spent time playing on the South African-based Sunshine Tour and the Canadian Tour. During the Canadian Tour season he had two victories at the ATB Financial Classic and the Players Cup and six top-10 finishes in only nine events played. He amassed earnings of $94,579 to lead the Canadian Tour Order of Merit and was chosen as the Player of the Year. At the end of the Canadian Tour season, he rejoined the Sunshine Tour and earned his third victory of the year at the BMG Classic. He finished 8th on the 2009 Sunshine Tour order of Merit while competing in only 5 tournaments and earned R 861,323.

DeLaet also played in one Nationwide Tour event in 2009, placing T31 at the Ford Wayne Gretzky Classic, with a score of 279 (6-under-par). He played in the 2009 RBC Canadian Open on the PGA Tour, placing T46 with a score of 282 (6-under-par).

DeLaet represented Canada with Wes Heffernan at the 2008 Omega Mission Hills World Cup. In 2009, he played alongside Stuart Anderson.

=== PGA Tour ===
In the fall of 2009, DeLaet began his qualifying run for the PGA Tour at the second of three stages, and qualified through his 72-hole event, advancing to the six-round PGA Tour Qualifying Tournament, set for early December, where the top 25 finishers would obtain their 2010 PGA Tour cards. He finished T8th and was a PGA Tour rookie for the 2010 season.

In 2010, after top-25 finishes in his first two events followed by five missed cuts, DeLaet had his best ever finish at the Shell Houston Open, finishing T-3, one stroke out of the playoff between Vaughn Taylor and Anthony Kim. He had his second top-10 finish of the 2010 season in October at the Viking Classic, with a T-5. The next week, DeLaet finished T-25 at the McGladrey Classic, his sixth top-25 finish of the season. He had his third top-10 finish of the season the next week with a T-6 at the Frys.com Open. The finish secured DeLaet his tour card for the 2011 PGA Tour season.

DeLaet was injured for much of 2011 with a back injury. He played in two PGA Tour events (T73 at the FedEx St. Jude Classic, missed cut at Travelers Championship) and two Nationwide Tour events (T36 at Melwood Prince George's County Open, missed cut at Albertsons Boise Open).

DeLaet played the 2012 season on a Major Medical Exemption with 26 starts to make $657,694 and match D. J. Trahan, the golfer who placed 125th on the 2011 money list. At the Sony Open in Hawaii, the first full-field event of the season, DeLaet led the first round in his first Tour event since June 2011. He finished fourth at the Zurich Classic of New Orleans, his best finish of the season. DeLaet satisfied the terms of his exemption in July 2012 with eight starts to spare and kept his Tour card.

A fully recovered DeLaet started his season with a missed cut at the Sony Open in Hawaii before making eight of his next nine through March, including two top-10s. He had a third-place finish at the Travelers Championship in June. He gained entry to the 2013 Open Championship (his first major tournament) as an alternate, by virtue of his world ranking and finished 83rd. At The Barclays, DeLaet had a career best PGA Tour finish of tied for 2nd with three other players, one stroke behind Adam Scott. DeLaet climbed to 32nd in the world rankings at the end of the season.

DeLaet's play during the 2013 season earned him a spot on the International Team for the 2013 Presidents Cup. DeLaet impressed captain Nick Price posting a 3–1–1 record, paired with Australian Jason Day for the first four sessions. DeLaet became just the second Canadian to play in the team competition, after Mike Weir.

DeLaet began the 2013–14 season with a missed cut at the Shriners Hospitals for Children Open, but then finished T7 at the CIMB Classic, T6 at the WGC-HSBC Champions and T2 at both the Farmers Insurance Open and the Waste Management Phoenix Open. The remainder of DeLaet's season was not as successful. He missed the cut in the Masters, the U.S. Open and the Open Championship. His 15th-place finish at the PGA Championship was the high point for DeLaet's play in the majors. He finished the season with two second-place finishes, seven top-10 finishes, six missed cuts, and a WD at the WGC-Bridgestone Invitational.

In 2016, DeLaet qualified for the 2016 Summer Olympics in Rio de Janeiro, marking golf's return to the Olympics for the first time since the 1904 Summer Olympics in St. Louis. DeLaet represented Canada. Canada was the defending nation of men's golf at the Olympics as George Lyon won gold in 1904. As DeLaet represented the defending champion nation he was in the first group to tee off at the tournament. Shortly before the games began, his caddie decided to not participate, prompting DeLaet to pick the recently retired NHL player Ray Whitney as his new caddie. DeLaet shot a 66 (5-under-par) in the first Olympic round ever on 11 August 2016, including 6 birdies and 1 bogey. He finished the tournament in 20th place.

On 7 June 2022, DeLaet announced his retirement from professional golf and competing on the PGA Tour. He cited ongoing back injuries as the reason for his retirement.

== Awards and honors ==
In 2007, DeLaet was earned Rookie of the Year honors for the Canadian Tour

== Amateur wins ==
- 2005 Saskatchewan Amateur
- 2006 Saskatchewan Amateur

== Professional wins (4) ==
=== Sunshine Tour wins (1) ===
No.	Date	Tournament	Winning score	Margin of victory	Runner-up
1	18 Oct 2009	BMG Classic	−11 (68-69-68=205)	1 stroke	(England) Jeff Inglis

=== Canadian Tour wins (3) ===
No.	Date	Tournament	Winning score	Margin of victory	Runner(s)-up
1	17 Aug 2008	Desjardins Montreal Open	−10 (70-69-68-67=274)	Playoff	(United States) George Bradford, (United States) Daniel Im
2	28 June 2009	ATB Financial Classic	−21 (72-64-67-64=267)	4 strokes	(United States) Byron Smith
3	19 Jul 2009	Canadian Tour Players Cup	−8 (69-72-66-69=276)	1 stroke	(Canada) Ryan Horn, (Brazil) Lucas Lee, (United States) Byron Smith

== Results in major championships ==
Tournament	2013	2014	2015	2016	2017
Masters Tournament		CUT			
U.S. Open		CUT			
The Open Championship	83	CUT	T68		
PGA Championship	CUT	T15			T7

Top 10
Did not play

CUT = missed the half-way cut
"T" indicates a tie for a place

=== Summary ===
Tournament	Wins	2nd	3rd	Top-5	Top-10	Top-25	Events	Cuts made
Masters Tournament	0	0	0	0	0	0	1	0
U.S. Open	0	0	0	0	0	0	1	0
The Open Championship	0	0	0	0	0	0	3	2
PGA Championship	0	0	0	0	1	2	3	2
Totals	0	0	0	0	1	2	8	4

- Most consecutive cuts made – 3 (2014 PGA – 2017 PGA, current)

== Results in The Players Championship ==
Tournament	2012	2013	2014	2015	2016	2017
The Players Championship	T70	T26	CUT	T56	CUT	CUT

CUT = missed the halfway cut
"T" indicates a tie for a place

== Results in World Golf Championships ==
Tournament	2013	2014
Match Play		R64
Championship		T34
Invitational		WD
Champions	T6	

Did not play

WD = withdrew
"T" = Tied

== PGA Tour career summary ==
Year	Starts	Cuts made	Wins	2nd	3rd	Top 10	Top 25	Earnings ($)	Money list rank
2007	1	0	0	0	0	0	0	0	n/a
2009	1	1	0	0	0	0	0	13,872	n/a
2010	28	15	0	0	1	3	8	954,011	100
2011	2	1	0	0	0	0	0	10,472	253
2012	23	17	0	0	0	3	5	1,051,951	95
2013	26	21	0	1	2	7	12	2,834,900	21
2014	24	18	0	2	0	7	11	2,616,518	30
2015	22	15	0	0	0	3	4	988,349	104
2016	21	14	0	0	0	3	5	908,557	112
2017	25	17	0	0	0	6	10	1,603,666	69
2018	3	3	0	0	0	1	1	251,630	187
2020	5	2	0	0	0	0	0	31,359	229
Career*	181	124	0	3	3	33	56	11,265,285	172

*As of the 2020 season.

== Team appearances ==
Amateur

- Four Nations Cup (representing Canada): 2005

Professional

- World Cup (representing Canada): 2008, 2009
- Presidents Cup (representing the International team): 2013

== See also ==
- 2009 PGA Tour Qualifying School graduates
