= 2012 Canadian Tour =

Golf tour season

2012 Canadian Tour season
- Duration: June 7, 2012 – September 9, 2012
- Number of official events: 8
- Most wins: (Canada) Eugene Wong (2)
- Order of Merit: (Canada) Matt Hill

The 2012 Canadian Tour was the 27th season of the Canadian Tour, the main professional golf tour in Canada since it was formed in 1986.

== PGA Tour takeover ==
In October, it was announced that the PGA Tour would takeover the tour, being renamed as PGA Tour Canada from 2013 onwards.

== Schedule ==
The following table lists official events during the 2012 season.

Date	Tournament	Location	Purse (C$)	Winner (Note: The number in parentheses after each winner's name is the number of Canadian Tour events they had won up to and including that tournament.)	OWGR points
Jun 10	Times Colonist Island Savings Open	British Columbia	150,000	(United States) Andrew Roque (1)	6
Jun 24	ATB Financial Classic	Alberta	175,000	(Canada) Michael Gligic (1)	6
Jul 1	Syncrude Boreal Open	Alberta	150,000	(Canada) Cory Renfrew (1)	6
Jul 8	Dakota Dunes Casino Open	Saskatchewan	150,000	(Canada) Matt Hill (1)	6
Jul 15	Canadian Tour Players Cup	Manitoba	150,000	(United States) Chris Killmer (1)	6
Aug 19	Jamieson WFCU Windsor Roseland Charity Classic	Ontario	100,000	(Scotland) Alan McLean (1)	6
Aug 26	Canadian Tour Championship	Ontario	100,000	(Canada) Eugene Wong (1)	6
Sep 9	Great Waterway Classic	Ontario	150,000	(Canada) Eugene Wong (2)	6

== Order of Merit ==
The Order of Merit was based on prize money won during the season, calculated in Canadian dollars.

Position	Player	Prize money (C$)
1	(Canada) Matt Hill	48,273
2	(Canada) Michael Gligic	42,950
3	(Canada) Cory Renfrew	41,436
4	(Canada) Eugene Wong	33,936
5	(United States) Andrew Roque	31,367
