= 2013 PGA Tour Canada =

Golf tour season

2013 PGA Tour Canada season
- Duration: June 6, 2013 – September 15, 2013
- Number of official events: 9
- Order of Merit: (Canada) Mackenzie Hughes

The 2013 PGA Tour Canada was the 28th season of the Canadian Tour, and the first under the operation and running of the PGA Tour.

== Schedule ==
The following table lists official events during the 2013 season.

Date	Tournament	Location	Purse (C$)	Winner (Note: The number in parentheses after each winner's name is the number of PGA Tour Canada events they had won up to and including that tournament. It is rare for someone to accumulate many wins on PGA Tour Canada as success at this level usually leads to promotion to the Web.com Tour.)	OWGR points
Jun 9	Times Colonist Island Savings Open	British Columbia	150,000	(United States) Stephen Gangluff (4)	6
Jul 7	Dakota Dunes Open	Saskatchewan	150,000	(United States) Wil Collins (1)	6
Jul 14	Syncrude Boreal Open	Alberta	150,000	(Canada) Riley Wheeldon (1)	6
Jul 21	The Players Cup	Manitoba	150,000	(United States) Carlos Sainz Jr. (1)	6
Aug 9; ~~Jun 23~~	ATB Financial Classic	Alberta	150,000	(United States) Joe Panzeri (2)	6
Aug 25	Great Waterway Classic	Ontario	150,000	(Chile) Hugo León (2)	6
Sep 1	Wildfire Invitational	Ontario	150,000	(United States) Mark Hubbard (1)	6
Sep 8	Cape Breton Celtic Classic	Nova Scotia	150,000	(Canada) Mackenzie Hughes (1)	6
Sep 15	Tour Championship of Canada	Ontario	150,000	(Canada) Max Gilbert (1)	6

== Order of Merit ==
The Order of Merit was based on prize money won during the season, calculated in Canadian dollars. The top five players on the Order of Merit earned status to play on the 2014 Web.com Tour.

Position	Player	Prize money (C$)
1	(Canada) Mackenzie Hughes	52,114
2	(Canada) Riley Wheeldon	45,323
3	(United States) Mark Hubbard	40,696
4	(Chile) Hugo León	39,897
5	(United States) Wil Collins	39,708

== See also ==
- 2013 PGA Tour Latinoamérica
