= 2006 Canadian Tour =

Golf tour season

2006 Canadian Tour season
- Duration: March 2, 2006 – September 3, 2006
- Number of official events: 12
- Most wins: (United States) Stephen Gangluff (2) (United States) Rob Oppenheim (2) (United States) Lee Williamson (2)
- Order of Merit: (United States) Stephen Gangluff

The 2006 Canadian Tour was the 21st season of the Canadian Tour, the main professional golf tour in Canada since it was formed in 1986.

== Schedule ==
The following table lists official events during the 2006 season.

Date	Tournament	Location	Purse (C$)	Winner (Note: The number in parentheses after each winner's name is the number of Canadian Tour events they had won up to and including that tournament.)	OWGR points
Mar 5	Yes! Golf BCR Classic	United States	US$100,000	(United States) Rob Oppenheim (1)	6
Mar 12	Yes! Golf BCR Challenge	United States	US$100,000	(United States) Brian Guetz (1)	6
Mar 26	Northern California Classic	United States	US$100,000	(United States) Matt Hansen (1)	6
Apr 23	Diablo Grande California Classic	United States	US$100,000	(United States) Lee Williamson (2)	6
May 14	Corona Mazatlán Classic	Mexico	US$125,000	(United States) Rob Oppenheim (2)	6
Jun 18	Greater Vancouver Charity Classic	British Columbia	100,000	(United States) Lee Williamson (3)	6
Jun 25	Times Colonist Open	British Columbia	150,000	(United States) Mike Grob (4)	6
Jul 2	Telus Edmonton Open	Alberta	150,000	(United States) Stephen Gangluff (2)	6
Jul 16	MTS Classic	Manitoba	150,000	(United States) Josh Habig (1)	6
Aug 6	Casino de Montreal Open	Quebec	200,000	(Canada) Wes Heffernan (1)	6
Aug 24	Fallsview Casino Resort Pro-Am Classic	Ontario	100,000	(United States) Stephen Gangluff (3)	6
Sep 3	Canadian Tour Championship	Ontario	160,000	(Canada) Stuart Anderson (2)	6

== Order of Merit ==
The Order of Merit was based on prize money won during the season, calculated in Canadian dollars.

Position	Player	Prize money (C$)
1	(United States) Stephen Gangluff	67,336
2	(United States) Rob Oppenheim	62,793
3	(Canada) Wes Heffernan	55,633
4	(United States) Lee Williamson	46,551
5	(Canada) Darren Griff	42,470
