= Dustin Risdon =

Canadian professional golfer (born 1981)

Dustin Risdon (born April 30, 1981) is a Canadian professional golfer. He joined the Canadian Professional Golf Tour in 2002 which has resulted in three Canadian wins.

Risdon was born in Strathmore, Alberta, Canada. He won both the Canadian Junior and Juvenile Championships in 1997. He was the Alberta Junior champion in 1998 and 1999.

Risdon won the 2008 ATB Financial Classic in his hometown of Calgary in a playoff over George Bradford. He shot 62 in the second round on his way to the title. Risdon finished T-2nd at the Players Cup, T-4th at the Stockton Sports Commission Classic, T-10 at the Saskatchewan Open. Broke through in 2007 by capturing the Telus Edmonton Open to win by a stroke over Alan McLean. Set a course record 63 in second round on his way to the title. Risdon finished T-3rd at the Free Press Manitoba Classic, T-7th at the Desjardins Montreal Open. Risdon missed just one cut all season. He advanced to second stage of 2007 PGA Tour Q-School ending the 2006 season 29th on the Order of Merit and made 9 of 12 cuts with a pair of top-tens. Risdon also finished T-6th at Diablo Grande California Classic and Times Colonist Open and retained the non-exempt status for 2006 with 93rd finish on 2005 Order of Merit.

Risdon won the 2010 ATB Financial Classic. He won the 2016 PGA Assistants' Championship of Canada.

== Professional wins (6) ==
=== Canadian Tour wins (3) ===
No.	Date	Tournament	Winning score	To par	Margin of victory	Runner-up
1	Jul 8, 2007	Telus Edmonton Open	70-63-65-67=265	−19	1 stroke	(Scotland) Alan McLean
2	Jun 29, 2008	ATB Financial Classic	67-62-65-70=264	−24	Playoff	(United States) George Bradford
3	Jul 4, 2010	ATB Financial Classic (2)	71-67-63-66=267	−17	4 strokes	(Canada) Adam Hadwin

=== Other wins (3) ===
- 2016 PGA Assistants' Championship of Canada
- 2017 Alberta Open
- 2019 PGA Championship of Canada
