= Jared du Toit =

Canadian professional golfer

Personal information
- Nationality: Canada
- Born: 22 May 1995 (age 31) Calgary, Alberta, Canada
- Height: 6 ft 1 in (1.85 m)

Career
- Sport: Golf
- College: University of Idaho; Arizona State University
- Turned professional: 2017
- Former tours: Korn Ferry Tour; Asian Tour; PGA Tour Canada; PGA Tour Americas
- Professional wins: 1

Jared du Toit (born 22 May 1995) is a Canadian professional golfer.

Du Toit played college golf at the University of Idaho for two years before transferring to Arizona State University.

At the 2016 RBC Canadian Open, du Toit was one stroke behind the leader Brandt Snedeker after 54 holes. This allowed him to play with Snedeker in the final pairing for the final round. He finished T9 and was the top Canadian and top amateur in the event. This was only his second professional event, the first being the SIGA Dakota Dunes Open on PGA Tour Canada. Du Toit improved to 25th in the World Amateur Golf Ranking with his finish and was the top ranked Canadian male amateur golfer. He entered his senior year at ASU in September 2016.

In May 2017, Du Toit announced his decision to turn pro.

== Amateur wins ==
- 2013 British Columbia Junior Championship
- 2014 University of Wyoming Southern
- 2015 Big Sky Conference Championship, British Columbia Amateur
- 2016 Glencoe Invitational
- 2017 The Prestige at PGA West

== Professional wins (1) ==
=== PGA Tour Canada wins (1) ===
No.	Date	Tournament	Winning score	Margin of victory	Runner-up
1	Sep 19, 2021	ATB Financial Classic	−11 (65-69-72-67=273)	1 stroke	(Canada) Wes Heffernan

== Team appearances ==
Amateur

- Eisenhower Trophy (representing Canada): 2016
