= 2021 PGA Tour Canada =

Golf tour season

2021 PGA Tour Canada season
- Duration: July 29, 2022 – October 3, 2022
- Number of official events: 8
- Most wins: (Canada) Callum Davison (2)
- Order of Merit: (Canada) Callum Davison

The 2021 PGA Tour Canada, titled as the 2021 Mackenzie Tour-PGA Tour Canada for sponsorship reasons, was the 35th season of the Canadian Tour, and the eighth under the operation and running of the PGA Tour.

== Forme Tour ==
In response to COVID-19 pandemic related restrictions on travel between the United States and Canada, the Forme Tour was created by the PGA Tour in 2021 in order to provide competition for non-Canadian PGA Tour Canada members. The tour consisted of eight tournaments in the United States, held between June and September. The tournaments awarded Official World Golf Ranking points, and the top five players in the Order of Merit at the end of the season earned Korn Ferry Tour membership for the 2022 season.

== Schedule ==
The following table lists official events during the 2021 season.

Date	Tournament	Location	Purse (C$)	Winner (Note: The number in parentheses after each winner's name is the number of PGA Tour Canada events they had won up to and including that tournament. It is rare for someone to accumulate many wins on PGA Tour Canada as success at this level usually leads to promotion to the Korn Ferry Tour.)
Aug 1	Mackenzie Investments Open	Quebec	100,000	(Canada) Brendan Leonard (1)
Aug 22	Osprey Valley Open	Ontario	100,000	(Canada) Noah Steele (a) (1)
Aug 28	Prince Edward Island Open	Prince Edward Island	100,000	(Canada) Michael Blair (1)
Sep 2	Brudenell River Classic	Prince Edward Island	50,000	(Canada) Callum Davison (1)
Sep 11	Elk Ridge Open	Saskatchewan	50,000	(Canada) Raoul Ménard (1)
Sep 19	ATB Financial Classic	Alberta	100,000	(Canada) Jared du Toit (1)
Sep 25	GolfBC Championship	British Columbia	100,000	(Canada) Callum Davison (2)
Oct 3	Reliance Properties DCBank Open	British Columbia	100,000	(Canada) Blair Bursey (1)

== Order of Merit ==
The Order of Merit was titled as the Points List and was based on tournament results during the season, calculated using a points-based system. The top five players on the Order of Merit earned status to play on the 2022 PGA Tour Canada.

Position	Player	Points
1	(Canada) Callum Davison	1,244
2	(Canada) Blair Bursey	1,051
3	(Canada) Noah Steele (a)	996
4	(Canada) Brendan Leonard	965
5	(Canada) Michael Blair	778

== See also ==
- 2020–21 PGA Tour Latinoamérica
