= Eidsvig =

Eidsvig is a surname. Notable people with the surname include:

- Bernt Ivar Eidsvig (born 1953), Norwegian Catholic Bishop of Oslo
- Harold Eidsvig (1915–1959), Canadian professional golfer
