= Montréal Open =

Montréal Open may refer to any of the following sporting events:

- Montreal Open (golf), a golf tournament on the Canadian Tour from 2004 to 2009
- Montréal Open (squash), a squash tournament on the PSA World Tour
