= Wil Collins =

American professional golfer

Personal information
- Nationality: United States
- Born: August 24, 1978 (age 48) Rapid City, South Dakota, U.S.
- Height: 5 ft 10 in (1.78 m)
- Weight: 179 lb (81 kg; 12.8 st)

Career
- Sport: Golf
- College: University of New Mexico
- Turned professional: 2002
- Former tours: PGA Tour; PGA Tour Canada; Gateway Tour eGolf Professional Tour
- Professional wins: 16

Best results in major championships
- Masters Tournament: DNP
- PGA Championship: DNP
- U.S. Open: CUT: 2005, 2013
- The Open Championship: DNP

Wil Collins (born August 24, 1978) is an American professional golfer who has played on the PGA Tour.

== Early life and amateur career ==
Collins was born in Rapid City, South Dakota. He played college golf at the University of New Mexico from 1998–2002, where he played with fellow PGA Tour professional Michael Letzig and won the 2001 Ben Hogan Award.

== Professional career ==
In 2002, Collins turned professional. He won the 2005 Colorado Open by six strokes. Major appearances include 2005 and 2013 U.S. Open, where he missed the cut both times.

Collins made a 20-foot par putt at the last hole of 2008 Q-School to win his 2009 PGA Tour card. He later said of it: "I finally have a home to play, and it's on the greatest tour in the world. It's going to take a while to sink in."

After Collins was unable to retain status in the United States, he took his game to PGA Tour Canada, where he won the 2013 Dakota Dunes Casino Open. Collins finished the season 5th on the PGA Tour Canada Order of Merit earning a spot on the 2014 Web.com Tour.

== Awards and honors ==
Collins won the 2001 Ben Hogan Award.

== Professional wins (16) ==
=== PGA Tour Canada wins (1) ===
No.	Date	Tournament	Winning score	Margin of victory	Runners-up
1	Jul 7, 2013	Dakota Dunes Open	−21 (66-65-70-66=267)	1 stroke	(United States) John Ellis, (Canada) Nick Taylor, (Canada) Ryan Yip

=== Gateway Tour wins (2) ===
No.	Date	Tournament	Winning score	Margin of victory	Runners-up
1	Jun 4, 2004	Desert Series 1	−22 (68-63-65-67=263)	3 strokes	(United States) Ryan Hanratty, (United States) Jerry Smith
2	Apr 21, 2005	Desert Spring 9	−11 (67-67-71=205)	2 strokes	(United States) Mikkel Reese

=== eGolf Professional Tour wins (1) ===
No.	Date	Tournament	Winning score	Margin of victory	Runner-up
1	Oct 4, 2013	Salisbury Classic	−16 (68-65-64=197)	Playoff	(United States) Dustin Bray

=== Other wins (12) ===
- 2005 Colorado Open
- 2008 One-Club Invitational, Boys of Summer Cup
- 2010 Idaho Open
- 2012 New Mexico Open, Nebraska Open
- 2016 Southern California Open
- 2022 Colorado Open
- 2023 Platte Valley Pro-Am, Navajo Trail Open
- 2024 Navajo Trail Open
- 2026 Sun Country PGA Championship

== See also ==
- 2008 PGA Tour Qualifying School graduates
