= Southwood Golf & Country Club =

Golf course in Winnipeg, Manitoba

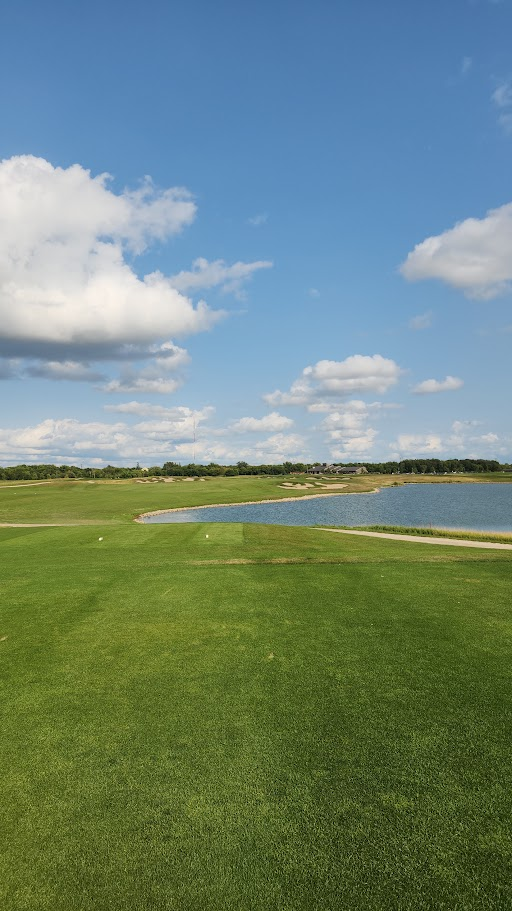
- 3rd tee box at Southwood Golf and Country Club

Club information
- Location: 80 Rue des Ruines du Monastere Winnipeg, Manitoba
- Established: 1894
- Type: Private
- Total holes: 18
- Tournaments: The Manitoba Open on the PGA Tour Americas (17 time host) and the 2017 Canada Summer Games golf tournament
- Website: https://southwood.ca
- Designed by: Tom McBroom
- Par: 72
- Length: 7,311 yards (6,685 m)
- Course rating: 75.9
- Slope rating: 138
- Course record: 61 (John Keefer)

Southwood Golf & Country Club is a premier private golf club located in the south end of Winnipeg, Manitoba. The course has hosted 17 professional events on the PGA Tour Americas and is a registered organization with the Manitoba Historical Society. The course is recognized by the Royal Canadian Golf Association as the oldest 18-hole golf course in Manitoba.

== History ==
The club was originally founded as the Norwood Golf Club in 1894 located on Markham Road in Winnipeg, Manitoba. The club was reincorporated to become the Southwood Golf & Country Club in after combining with the Winnipeg Hunt Club. With the expansion of the club in 1919, additional land was acquired from the Agricultural College at a total cost of $150. The original course was designed by Willlie Park, who was a two time British Open champion. The course was re-designed in later years by Stanley Thompson, his first project in Canada. The original grand clubhouse was built in 1913, but destroyed by a fire in 1935, leading to the old hunting club facilities to be used until the new clubhouse was built in 1957.

In 2007, the course was forced to move due to pressures from an ever expanding University of Manitoba and erosion of the river bank of the Red River. The club purchased 297 acres of land in the St. Norbert neighbourhood in the south end of the city to build the course that exist today, which officially opened in 2011. In January 2008, the University of Manitoba purchased the former golf course property and, once the new course was playable, took possession of the land for future expansion and in 2023 it was announced the grounds would become a permanent facility for the National Centre for Truth and Reconciliation.

The new par 72 course designed by Tom McBroom sits between the La Salle River and Trappist Monastery Provincial Heritage Park with additional land set aside to expand with nine new holes in the future. The course features 75 sand traps, a state of the art 15-acre practice facility, and a brand new clubhouse. The design incorporates natural and historical features, such as remnants of the former Trappist monastery and abundant wildlife. The project was made possible through collaboration among governments, community groups, and the club itself.

== The Manitoba Open ==
The Manitoba Open has been hosted at Southwood 17 times, the first being in 1939 at the old location. The new location has hosted the event five times with two more cancelled due to COVID-19.

Year	Venue	Winner	Score	Ref
CentrePort Canada Rail Park Manitoba Open
2024	Southwood G&CC	(United States) Johnny Keefer	262 (−26)	
2023	Southwood G&CC	(United States) Hayden Springer	267 (−21)	
2022	Southwood G&CC	(United States) Parker Coody	261 (−27)	
2020–21	Southwood G&CC	No tournament due to COVID-19 Pandemic		
The Players Cup
2019	Southwood G&CC	(United States) Derek Barron	274 (−14)	
2018	Southwood G&CC	(United States) Tyler McCumber	266 (−22)	
Manitoba Open
1990	Southwood G&CC	(United States) Jeff Bloom	264	
1989	Southwood G&CC	(United States) Stu Hendley	265	
1988	Southwood G&CC	(Canada) Dave Barr	270	
1987	Southwood G&CC	(Canada) Dave Barr	266	
1986	Southwood G&CC	(Canada) Bob Panasik	204 (Note: Panasik won on the second hole of a sudden-death playoff.)	
1985	Southwood G&CC; Elmhurst GC	(Canada) Robbie Phillips	137 (Note: Heavy rain rendered the Southwood G&CC course unplayable, which led to the cancellation of the second round and the tournament being reduced to 36-holes, with the final round played at Elmhurst GC.)	
1963	Southwood G&CC	(United States) Dayton Olson	213 (Note: Olson won following a playoff.)	
1956	Southwood G&CC	Ev Stuart	284	
1949	Southwood G&CC	(Canada) Harold Eidsvig	142	
1944	Southwood G&CC	(Canada) Allan Boes	143	
1939	Southwood G&CC	Kas Zebowski	141	

== Scorecard ==
Tee	Rating/Slope	1	2	3	4	5	6	7	8	9	Out	10	11	12	13	14	15	16	17	18	In	Total
Par		4	3	4	5	4	4	5	3	4	36	4	3	4	4	5	4	4	3	5	36	72
Black	M:75.4 / 136	475	215	416	531	354	481	576	180	438	3,666	484	228	370	398	540	446	454	166	559	3,645	7,311
Gold	M:72.5 / 130	431	194	390	505	327	431	542	153	411	3,384	451	201	346	367	513	419	427	155	515	3,394	6,778
Blue	M:70.7 / 125	421	158	366	497	316	418	531	146	391	3,244	423	176	320	340	490	396	417	130	475	3,167	6,411
White	M:68.8 / 118	379	150	343	473	285	367	489	126	364	2,976	392	153	295	307	464	390	385	130	468	2,984	5,960
Green	M:65.5 / 109	351	130	267	404	249	341	446	103	337	2,628	363	138	266	262	418	326	358	112	443	2,686	5,314

== See also ==
- List of golf courses in Manitoba
