= Rob Oppenheim =

American professional golfer (born 1980)

Personal information
- Nationality: United States
- Born: January 12, 1980 (age 46) Salem, Massachusetts, U.S.
- Height: 5 ft 10 in (1.78 m)
- Weight: 165 lb (75 kg)
- Spouse: Lacey
- Children: 2

Career
- Sport: Golf
- College: Rollins College
- Turned professional: 2002
- Current tour: Korn Ferry Tour
- Former tours: PGA Tour; Canadian Tour
- Professional wins: 10

Number of wins by tour
- Korn Ferry Tour: 1
- Other: 9

Best results in major championships
- Masters Tournament: DNP
- PGA Championship: DNP
- U.S. Open: T37: 2016
- The Open Championship: DNP

Rob Oppenheim (born January 12, 1980) is an American professional golfer.

== Early and personal life ==
In 1980, Oppenheim was born in Salem, Massachusetts. His parents are Jim and Karen Oppenheim. Oppenheim played for the Andover High School golf team, where he made the all-scholastic team, and also played baseball and basketball for the school.

Oppenheim went on to play for Rollins College (Economics, 2002), where he was also a member of Alpha Mu Delta of Chi Psi.

== Amateur career ==
In 1999, he advanced to the round of 16 at the U.S. Amateur at Pebble Beach, California, in 1999. While at college he was a four-time All-American in golf and in 2002 won the Player of the Year award for Division II golf. Also in 2002 he led Rollins to the NCAA Division II National Championship. In 2002, he won the Massachusetts Amateur.

== Professional career ==
Oppenheim turned professional in September 2002. Since then, he has played on the Canadian Tour, Cleveland Tour, Hooter's Winter Series, and Moonlight Tour. In 2004, he was the medalist at the first stage of PGA Tour Q-School but fail to earn his card. In 2005, he was the Cleveland Tour leading money winner and New England Pro Tour Player of the Year. In 2006, he finished second on Canadian Tour Order of Merit (money list).

Oppenheim played in two PGA Tour events in the 2006 season, finishing tied for 108th and tied for 41st in the Deutsche Bank Championship and the Bell Canadian Open, respectively. He attempted to enter the PGA Tour in October 2008 in Q School. He came in 27th when the top 23 advance. In 2009 he successfully graduated to the Nationwide Tour, where he played regularly until 2015.

In 2014, he finished only 79th in the Web.com Tour rankings, but then finished 11th at the Web.com Tour Q School to earn a return. He won his first Web.com Tour tournament in June 2015. Despite his win, Oppenheim missed the cut at the final regular season event and finished 26th on the money list, one spot and $943 short of Harold Varner III, the player who finished 25th and earned the last automatic PGA Tour card. After just missing out on a Tour card during the regular season, Oppenheim earned a PGA Tour card through the Web.com Tour Finals by just $101 over Eric Axley. The card was made possible after Lucas Glover bogeyed the 18th in the final round of the Web.com Tour Championship to finish T12 with Oppenheim, giving him just enough to earn a PGA Tour card. Oppenheim only found out when he got a phone call from the PGA Tour after he left the course, feeling dejected after thinking he just missed earning a Tour card. The 2015-16 PGA Tour season will be the first for Oppenheim after six years on the Web.com Tour.

Oppenheim didn't earn enough to retain his Tour card and ended the abbreviated Web.com Tour Finals $392 short of regaining his PGA Tour privileges. At the 2017 AT&T Pebble Beach Pro-Am, Oppenheim shot a 9-under-par score of 278, finishing T8, and won $216,000. It was his career-best PGA Tour finish for Oppenheim, who was playing on a sponsor exemption.

== Personal life ==
Oppenheim lives near Orlando, Florida, with his wife, Lacey, and two children.

== Amateur wins ==
This list may be incomplete

- 2002 Massachusetts Amateur

== Professional wins (9) ==
=== Korn Ferry Tour wins (1) ===
No.	Date	Tournament	Winning score	Margin of victory	Runner-up
1	Jun 7, 2015	Air Capital Classic	−13 (67-67-69-64=267)	1 stroke	(United States) Andy Winings

Korn Ferry Tour playoff record (0–2)

No.	Year	Tournament	Opponent(s)	Result
1	2017	DAP Championship	(United States) Chesson Hadley, (United States) Nicholas Lindheim	Lindheim won with birdie on first extra hole
2	2024	Club Car Championship	(United States) Steven Fisk	Lost to par on first extra hole

=== Canadian Tour wins (2) ===
No.	Date	Tournament	Winning score	Margin of victory	Runner(s)-up
1	Mar 5, 2006	Yes! Golf BCR Classic	−17 (66-71-68-66=271)	Playoff	(United States) Craig Kanada, (Canada) Jim Rutledge, (United States) Omar Uresti
2	May 14, 2006	Corona Mazatlán Classic	−15 (73-67-69-64=273)	Playoff	(United States) Stephen Gangluff

=== Cleveland Golf Tour (3) ===
- 2004 Captain's Open
- 2005 Atkinson Open, New Hampshire Open

=== Other wins (3) ===
This list may be incomplete

- 2007 Greater Bangor Open
- 2009 Massachusetts Open, New Hampshire Open

== Results in major championships ==
Tournament	2014	2015	2016	2017	2018
Masters Tournament					
U.S. Open	CUT		T37		
The Open Championship					
PGA Championship					

Tournament	2019
Masters Tournament	
PGA Championship	
U.S. Open	CUT
The Open Championship	

Did not play

CUT = missed the half-way cut
"T" = tied

== See also ==
- 2015 Web.com Tour Finals graduates
- 2017 Web.com Tour Finals graduates
- 2019 Korn Ferry Tour Finals graduates
- List of Jewish golfers
