= Adam Bland =

Australian professional golfer

Personal information
- Full name: Adam James Bland
- Nationality: Australia
- Born: 26 August 1982 (age 44) Mildura, Victoria, Australia
- Height: 1.85 m (6 ft 1 in)
- Weight: 95 kg (209 lb; 15.0 st)

Career
- Sport: Golf
- Turned professional: 2005
- Current tour: PGA Tour of Australasia
- Former tours: European Tour; Japan Golf Tour; Nationwide Tour; Canadian Tour; Gateway Tour
- Professional wins: 5

Number of wins by tour
- Japan Golf Tour: 1
- PGA Tour of Australasia: 1
- Other: 3

Best results in major championships
- Masters Tournament: DNP
- PGA Championship: DNP
- U.S. Open: DNP
- The Open Championship: CUT: 2006, 2015, 2017

Achievements and awards
- Von Nida Tour Order of Merit winner: 2005

Adam James Bland (born 26 August 1982) is an Australian professional golfer who has played on a number of the world's golf tours.

== Professional career ==
In 2005, Bland turned professional. He plays on the PGA Tour of Australasia. He won the 2005 Western Australia PGA Championship on the tour's developmental tour, the Von Nida Tour. He also played on the Gateway Tour in 2005 and had five top-10 finishes. He played on the Canadian Tour in 2007 and 2008 with six top-10s including two wins in 2007. He played on the Nationwide Tour (now Web.com Tour) from 2009 to 2011 with his best finish a playoff loss to Troy Merritt in the 2009 Mexico Open.

He began playing on the Japan Golf Tour in 2014 and won the third event of the 2015 season, the Japan PGA Championship Nissin Cupnoodles Cup.

== Professional wins (5) ==
=== Japan Golf Tour Tour wins (1) ===
Legend
Japan majors (1)
Other Japan Golf Tour (0)

No.	Date	Tournament	Winning score	Margin of victory	Runner-up
1	17 May 2015	Japan PGA Championship Nissin Cupnoodles Cup	−16 (64-68-64-72=268)	3 strokes	(South Korea) Lee Sang-hee

=== PGA Tour of Australasia wins (1) ===
No.	Date	Tournament	Winning score	Margin of victory	Runner-up
1	25 Oct 2026	Players Series SA^{1}	−17 (67-65-64-67=263)	2 strokes	(Australia) Louis Dobbelaar

^{1}Mixed event with the WPGA Tour of Australasia

PGA Tour of Australasia playoff record (0–2)

No.	Year	Tournament	Opponents	Result
1	2022	Victorian PGA Championship	(Australia) Brett Coletta, (Australia) Andrew Martin, (Australia) Lincoln Tighe	Martin won with birdie on fifth extra hole Bland and Coletta eliminated by birdie on first hole
2	2026	Ford NSW Open	(Australia) Lachlan Aylen, (Australia) Ben Eccles	Eccles won with birdie on third extra hole Aylen eliminated by par on first hole

=== Canadian Tour wins (2) ===
No.	Date	Tournament	Winning score	Margin of victory	Runner(s)-up
1	15 Apr 2007	San Jose International Open	−9 (74-67-71-67=279)	Playoff	(United States) John Ellis, (United States) Scott Gibson, (United States) Spencer Levin
2	6 May 2007	Ford Culiacan Open	−18 (64-66-69-67=266)	3 strokes	(United States) Michael Harris

=== Von Nida Tour wins (1) ===
No.	Date	Tournament	Winning score	Margin of victory	Runner-up
1	29 May 2005	WA PGA Championship	−15 (66-70-67-70=273)	1 stroke	(Australia) Brad Lamb

== Playoff record ==
Nationwide Tour playoff record (0–1)

No.	Year	Tournament	Opponent	Result
1	2009	Mexico Open	(United States) Troy Merritt	Lost to birdie on first extra hole

== Results in major championships ==
Tournament	2006	2007	2008	2009	2010	2011	2012	2013	2014	2015	2016	2017
The Open Championship	CUT									CUT		CUT

CUT = missed the halfway cut
Note: Bland only played in The Open Championship.

== Results in World Golf Championships ==
Results not in chronological order before 2015.

Tournament	2011	2012	2013	2014	2015	2016	2017	2018
Championship								T18
Match Play								
Invitational								
Champions	77							T54

Did not play

"T" = Tied

== Team appearances ==
Amateur

- Australian Men's Interstate Teams Matches (representing South Australia): 2002, 2003, 2004
