= Matt Hill (golfer) =

Canadian professional golfer (born 1988)

Personal information
- Nationality: Canada
- Born: September 12, 1988 (age 38) Sarnia, Ontario, Canada
- Height: 6 ft 3 in (1.91 m)
- Weight: 185 lb (84 kg; 13.2 st)

Career
- Sport: Golf
- College: North Carolina State University
- Turned professional: 2010
- Current tour: PGA Tour Canada
- Professional wins: 1

Achievements and awards
- Haskins Award: 2009
- Canadian Tour Order of Merit winner: 2012

Matt Hill (born September 12, 1988) is a Canadian professional golfer best known for winning the NCAA Division I Championship in 2009. He currently plays on PGA Tour Canada.

== Amateur career ==
Hill was born in Sarnia, Ontario. He grew up in the Sarnia suburb of Brights Grove, the same neighborhood that Mike Weir grew up in. Hill played college golf at North Carolina State University. He won the NCAA individual title in 2009, which along with seven other victories that season equaled Tiger Woods record for the most wins by a college golfer in a season. He won ten tournaments during his time at NC State. He won the Haskins Award as the Most Outstanding Collegiate Golfer for 2009 and was named the 2009 ACC Male Athlete of the Year.

== Professional career ==
In the summer of 2009, Hill competed in three PGA Tour events as an amateur. He missed the cut at two tournaments, and finished tied for 70th at the AT&T Classic.

Hill turned professional in 2010, skipping his final year at North Carolina State, and signed a sponsorship with Nike. He played on the NGA Hooters Tour before joining the Canadian Tour in 2012. In his first event of the year in Canada, he finished in a tie for eighth and the following week he finished in second. The week after his runner-up finish, Hill won the Dakota Dunes Casino Open, defeating Will Strickler in a playoff.

In his first full season, 2012, on the Canadian Tour, Hill was the tour's top money-winner.

== Professional wins (1) ==
=== Canadian Tour wins (1) ===
No.	Date	Tournament	Winning score	Margin of victory	Runner-up
1	Jul 8, 2012	Dakota Dunes Casino Open	−19 (67-68-66-68=269)	Playoff	(United States) Will Strickler
