= Darren Veitch =

Canadian ice hockey player

- Born: April 24, 1960 (age 66) Saskatoon, Saskatchewan, Canada
- Height: 6 ft 0 in (183 cm)
- Weight: 200 lb (91 kg; 14 st 4 lb)
- Position: Defence
- Shot: Right
- Played for: AHL; Hershey Bears; Newmarket Saints; Moncton Hawks; NHL; Washington Capitals; Detroit Red Wings; Toronto Maple Leafs
- NHL draft: 5th overall, 1980; Washington Capitals
- Playing career: 1980–1992

Darren William Veitch (born April 24, 1960) is a Canadian former professional ice hockey player. He played 511 career National Hockey League games for the Washington Capitals, Detroit Red Wings and Toronto Maple Leafs. He was drafted in the first round, fifth overall, by the Washington Capitals in the 1980 NHL entry draft. He played his last NHL game in 1991 and bounced around the minor leagues before finally retiring in 1999.

Born in Saskatoon, Saskatchewan, Veitch won an Ed Chynoweth Cup with the Regina Pats in 1980 to cap off a stellar junior career.

Darren also had a distinguished amateur golf career in addition to his hockey exploits. He was the 1983 Saskatchewan Amateur champion after a three-round score of 218 at the Elmwood Golf and Country Club in Swift Current. He was also a two-time runner-up in the tournament finishing second in both 1981 and 1984.

== Career statistics ==
			Regular season					Playoffs
Season	Team	League	GP	G	A	Pts	PIM	GP	G	A	Pts	PIM
1976–77	Regina Blues	SJHL	60	15	21	36	121	—	—	—	—	—
1976–77	Regina Pats	WCHL	1	0	0	0	0	—	—	—	—	—
1977–78	Regina Pats	WCHL	71	13	32	45	135	9	0	2	2	4
1978–79	Regina Pats	WHL	51	11	36	47	80	—	—	—	—	—
1979–80	Regina Pats	WHL	71	29	93	122	118	18	13	18	31	13
1980–81	Washington Capitals	NHL	59	4	21	25	46	—	—	—	—	—
1980–81	Hershey Bears	AHL	26	6	22	28	12	10	6	3	9	15
1981–82	Washington Capitals	NHL	67	9	44	53	54	—	—	—	—	—
1981–82	Hershey Bears	AHL	10	5	10	15	16	—	—	—	—	—
1982–83	Washington Capitals	NHL	10	0	8	8	0	—	—	—	—	—
1982–83	Hershey Bears	AHL	5	0	1	1	2	—	—	—	—	—
1983–84	Washington Capitals	NHL	46	6	18	24	17	5	0	1	1	15
1983–84	Hershey Bears	AHL	11	1	6	7	4	—	—	—	—	—
1984–85	Washington Capitals	NHL	75	3	18	21	37	5	0	1	1	4
1985–86	Washington Capitals	NHL	62	3	9	12	27	—	—	—	—	—
1985–86	Detroit Red Wings	NHL	13	0	5	5	2	—	—	—	—	—
1986–87	Detroit Red Wings	NHL	77	13	45	58	52	12	3	4	7	8
1987–88	Detroit Red Wings	NHL	63	7	33	40	45	11	1	5	6	6
1988–89	Toronto Maple Leafs	NHL	37	3	7	10	16	—	—	—	—	—
1988–89	Newmarket Saints	AHL	33	5	19	24	29	5	0	4	4	4
1989–90	Newmarket Saints	AHL	78	13	54	67	30	—	—	—	—	—
1990–91	Toronto Maple Leafs	NHL	2	0	1	1	0	—	—	—	—	—
1990–91	Newmarket Saints	AHL	56	7	28	35	26	—	—	—	—	—
1990–91	Peoria Rivermen	IHL	18	2	14	16	10	19	4	12	16	10
1991–92	EV Landshut	1.GBun	14	2	4	6	4	—	—	—	—	—
1991–92	Moncton Hawks	AHL	61	6	23	29	47	11	0	6	6	2
1992–93	Peoria Rivermen	IHL	79	12	37	49	16	4	2	0	2	4
1993–94	Peoria Rivermen	IHL	76	21	54	75	16	6	1	1	2	0
1994–95	Peoria Rivermen	IHL	75	8	42	50	42	9	0	2	2	8
1995–96	Peoria Rivermen	IHL	15	1	9	10	8	—	—	—	—	—
1995–96	Phoenix Roadrunners	IHL	43	1	15	16	12	1	0	0	0	0
1997–98	Phoenix Mustangs	WCHL	59	6	31	37	40	9	3	6	9	12
1998–99	Phoenix Mustangs	WCHL	52	3	29	32	46	3	0	1	1	2
NHL totals			511	48	209	257	296	33	4	11	15	33
AHL totals			280	43	163	206	166	26	6	13	19	21
IHL totals			306	45	171	216	104	39	7	15	22	22

== Awards ==
- WHL First All-Star Team – 1980

Preceded by Mike Gartner	Washington Capitals first-round draft pick 1980	Succeeded by Bobby Carpenter
