= Ohio Open =

Golf tournament

The Ohio Open is the Ohio state open golf tournament, open to both amateur and professional golfers. It is organized by the Northern Ohio section of the PGA of America. It was first played in 1924 and has been played annually (with minor disruptions) at a variety of courses around the state. It was considered a PGA Tour event in the late 1920s and early 1930s.

== Winners ==
- 2026 Daniel Wetterich
- 2025 Will Grimmer
- 2024 Drew Salyers
- 2023 Michael Balcar
- 2022 Jordan Gilkison (a)
- 2021 Jake McBride
- 2020 Alex Weiss
- 2019 Stephen Gangluff
- 2018 Stephen Gangluff
- 2017 Chase Wilson
- 2016 Tim Crouch
- 2015 Justin Lower
- 2014 Tim Ailes
- 2013 Colin Biles
- 2012 Justin Lower
- 2011 Mike Emery
- 2010 Bob Sowards
- 2009 Vaughn Snyder
- 2008 Tyler Riley
- 2007 Eric Frishette
- 2006 Danny Sahl
- 2005 Rob Moss
- 2004 Bob Sowards
- 2003 Ryan Dennis
- 2002 Bob Sowards
- 2001 Rob Moss
- 2000 Ken Tanigawa
- 1999 Rob Moss
- 1998 Chris Black
- 1997 Nevin Sutcliffe
- 1996 Dennis Miller
- 1995 Ivan Smith
- 1994 Chris Smith
- 1993 Mitch Camp
- 1992 Chris Smith
- 1991 Jack Ferenz
- 1990 Bruce Soulsby
- 1989 Tony Mollica
- 1988 Don Padgett II
- 1987 Joe Kruczek
- 1986 Gary Robison
- 1985 Mitch Camp
- 1984 Roy Hobson
- 1983 Gene Boni
- 1982 Walter Cerrato
- 1981 Kim Boehlke
- 1980 Jim Logue
- 1979 Gary Trivisonno
- 1978 Bob Lewis (a)
- 1977 Gene Ferrell
- 1976 Martin Roesink
- 1975 Todd Crandall
- 1974 Deon Good
- 1973 Dick Plummer
- 1972 Bob Wynn
- 1971 Bob Wynn
- 1970 Bob Wynn
- 1969 Cliff Cook
- 1968 Frank Wharton
- 1967 Frank Boynton
- 1966 Frank Boynton
- 1965 Tom Weiskopf
- 1964 Don Stickney
- 1963 Bob Shave
- 1962 Bob Shave
- 1961 Frank Stranahan
- 1960 Frank Stranahan
- 1959 Lee Raymond
- 1958 Bob Shave (a)
- 1957 Ed Griffiths
- 1956 Jack Nicklaus (a)
- 1955 Billy Burke
- 1954 Dick Shoemaker
- 1953 Dick Shoemaker
- 1952 Frank Gelhot
- 1951 Herman Keiser
- 1950 Denny Shute
- 1949 Herman Keiser
- 1948 Frank Stranahan (a)
- 1947 Al Marchi
- 1946 John Krisko
- 1945 Billy Burke
- 1944 Maurice McCarthy (a)
- 1943 No tournament
- 1942 Byron Nelson
- 1941 Byron Nelson
- 1940 Byron Nelson
- 1939 Billy Burke
- 1938 Billy Burke
- 1937 Philip Perkins
- 1936 Al Espinosa
- 1935 Ted Luther
- 1934 Lloyd Gullickson
- 1933 Al Espinosa
- 1932 Al Espinosa
- 1931 Denny Shute
- 1930 Denny Shute
- 1929 Denny Shute
- 1928 Jack Thompson
- 1927 Albert Alcroft
- 1926 Albert Alcroft
- 1925 Larry Nabholtz
- 1924 Emmet French
- (a) denotes amateur
