= Golf Saskatchewan =

- Sport: Golf
- Abbreviation: GS
- Founded: 1913
- Affiliation: Golf Canada
- Headquarters: Saskatoon, Sask.

Golf Saskatchewan (previously known as the Saskatchewan Golf Association) is the provincial amateur governing body for the sport of golf in the province of Saskatchewan. The organization is a member of Golf Canada, the national sport governing body. Golf Saskatchewan is overseen by an elected board of directors from across Saskatchewan.

== History ==
The Saskatchewan Golf Association came to its current structure on April 12, 1999 when it was officially incorporated for business through the amalgamation of the previous Saskatchewan Golf Association (SGA), an all-male organization, and the Canadian Ladies Golf Association (CLGA) Saskatchewan Branch, an all-female organization. The SGA was formed in 1913. Meanwhile, the CLGA Saskatchewan Branch was officially formed in 1926.

== Tournaments ==
Each year, Golf Saskatchewan holds nine provincial championship events at predetermined locations across the province. The tournaments conducted on an annual basis are:

- Saskatchewan Junior Men's Championship
- Saskatchewan Junior Women's Championship
- Saskatchewan Amateur Women's Championship
- Saskatchewan Mid-Amateur Men's Championship
- Saskatchewan Amateur Men's Championship
- Saskatchewan Senior Men's Championship
- Saskatchewan Mid-Master's (40+) Championship
- Saskatchewan Senior Women's Championship
- Saskatchewan Women's Rosebowl Championship
- Saskatchewan Mixed Team Championship

== Past Presidents ==
Years	President	Past President
2019	Delbert Betnar	Kyle Mulligan
2018	Delbert Betnar	Kyle Mulligan
2017	Kyle Mulligan	Richard Smith
2016	Kyle Mulligan	Richard Smith
2015	Richard Smith	Moe Martin
2014	Richard Smith	Moe Martin
2013	Moe Martin	Dave Forster
2012	Moe Marin	Dave Forster
2011	Dave Forster	Byron Harvie
2010	Byron Harvie	Randy Stefan
2009	Byron Harvie	Randy Stefan
2008	Randy Stefan	Cathy Bildfell
2007	Randy Stefan	Cathy Bildfell
2006	Cathy Bildfell	Michael Smith
2005	Michael Smith	Melodie Lawrek
2004	Michael Smith	Melodie Lawrek
2003	Melodie Lawrek	Lynne Lacroix
2002	Lynne Lacroix	Daryl Bitz
2001	Daryl Bitz	Dick DeRyk
2000	Dick DeRyk	Con Hammer
1999	Dick DeRyk	Con Hammer
Year	Saskatchewan Ladies Golf Association	Saskatchewan Golf Association
1998	Pat Buglass	Con Hammer
1997	Catherine Paton	Con Hammer
1996	Catherine Paton	Bill Klein
1995	Wenda Coley	Bill Klein
1994	Wenda Coley	Terry Meier
1993	Birdie Prosofsky	Terry Meier
1992	Birdie Prosofsky	Bill McRae
1991	Shirley Besse	Ted Wharington
1990	Janice Courtice	Ted Wharington
1989	Janice Courtice	Bill Wallace
1988	Wilda Schab	Bill Wallace
1987	Wilda Schab	Bill Taylor
1986	Jean Humbert	Bill Taylor
1985	Jean Humbert	Bill Taylor
1984	Jean Johnstone	Jack Eisner
1983	Jean Johnstone	Bob Elmore
1982	Joyce Dagorne	Jim Stothers
1981	Joyce Dagorne	Jim Stothers
1980	Pat Baker	Lloyd Scaddan
1979	Pat Baker	Lloyd Scaddan
1978	Ida Shepherd	Jack Williamson
1977	Ida Shepherd	Ray Marsh
1976	Eleanor Reid	Ray Marsh
1975	Eleanor Reid	Al Young
1974	Eleanor Van Impe	Al Young
1973	Eleanor Van Impe	Keith Rever
1972	Vi Heywood	Keith Rever
1971	Vi Heywood	Jack Miller
1970	Marguerite Slack	Jack Miller
1969	Marguerite Slack	Jack Tait
1968	Irene Mackenzie	Ross Reibling
1967	Irene Mackenzie	Jules Swick
1966	Esther Medhurst	Gerry Welsh
1965	Louise Jones	Bob Thomson
1964	Marguerite Slack	Alec Bland
1963	Dorothy Donally	Jack D. Heywood
1962	Kay McNamee	Bob Stovin
1961	Willa Haughton	William (Bill) Kemp
1960	Margaret Walker	Harry Slack
1959	Alice Elder	Wayne Winkler
1958	Phyllis Trotter	Del Wilson
1957	Mae Balmos	Blair Nelson
1956	Jesse McBain	Hugh P. Thomson
1955	Mary Hunt	Dr. Robert Reid
1954	Gladys Rideout	Glenn Richardson
1953	Rene Speers	Dr. Jack Leddy
1952	Wally Bushe	Gordon A. Beattie
1951	Scotty Johnstone	Herb Kilburn
1950	Edna Andrews	Herb Kilburn
1949	Marguerite Slack	Dr. Ben Reid
1948	Phyllis Trotter	Dr. Ben Reid
1947	Ede Boyle	N. C. (Newt) Byers
1946	Peggy Robb	N. C. (Newt) Byers
1945		
1944		
1943		
1942	T.D. Gleave	N. C. (Newt) Byers
1941	R.R. Watts	J. H. Warren
1940	Gladys Rideout	S.D. (Sam) Boylan
1939	W. Knight Wilson	George Holden
1938	Amy Holroyde	Dr. George Bigelow
1937	T.B. Gibson	Frank Harris
1936	Virginia Brown	Clement Alexander
1935	W. Cameron/Agnes Rorison	John Know
1934	Eva Weir/Clara Campbell	A.D. Taylor
1933	W.J. Wrye	N. C. (Newt) Byers
1932	J.H.S. Garrett/Agnes Rorison	J. Russell Smith
1931	Myrtle Creighton	J.D. Gunn
1930	H. Middlemas	T. Tellison
1929	R.R. Morgan/F.R. Nason	W.H.A. Hill
1928	Gladys Rideout	W. Ritchie
1927	Gladys Rideout	Dr. H.L. Jacques
1926		Robert (Bob) Charlton
1925		Frank Miley
1924		Frank Miley
1923		Lorne Johnson
1922		B.M. Wakeling
1921		James Smith
1920		N. C. (Newt) Byers
1919		J.D. (Jack) Turnbull
1918		Harold C. Pope
1917		A.F. Angus
1916		W. (Bill) Laidlaw
1915		James Balfour
1914		James Balfour
1913		James Balfour
