= Joe McDermott (golfer) =

Irish-American golfer

Personal information
- Nationality: Ireland; United States
- Born: 17 September 1940 (age 86) County Clare, Ireland
- Height: 5 ft 9 in (1.75 m)
- Weight: 170 lb (77 kg; 12 st)

Career
- Sport: Golf
- Turned professional: 1968
- Former tour: European Seniors Tour
- Professional wins: 2

Number of wins by tour
- European Senior Tour: 1

Best results in major championships
- Masters Tournament: DNP
- PGA Championship: CUT: 1982
- U.S. Open: CUT: 1967, 1968
- The Open Championship: DNP

Joe McDermott (born 17 September 1940) is an Irish-American professional golfer.

== Career ==
Born and raised in County Clare, Ireland, McDermott moved to the United States in the 1960s. He won the Chicago City Amateur twice, the Cook County Amateur twice, and the Midwest Amateur three times before turning pro in 1968.

McDermott also won the 1977 New Mexico Open as well as multiple PGA sectional events before qualifying for the European Seniors Tour at the Qualifying School in 1997. He may be best known for winning the 1998 AIB Irish Seniors Open at Woodbrook. During the tournament he shot a hole-in-one on the 13th hole during the final round. He also shot an ace at the 2001 Wales Seniors Open.

== Professional wins (1) ==
=== European Seniors Tour wins (1) ===
No.	Date	Tournament	Winning score	Margin of victory	Runners-up
1	17 May 1998	AIB Irish Seniors Open	−8 (70-72-66=208)	Playoff	(Australia) Terry Gale, (Australia) Noel Ratcliffe

European Seniors Tour playoff record (1–0)

No.	Year	Tournament	Opponents	Result
1	1998	AIB Irish Seniors Open	(Australia) Terry Gale, (Australia) Noel Ratcliffe	Won with birdie on fifth extra hole Ratcliffe eliminated by par on first hole
