= New Mexico Open =

The New Mexico Open is the New Mexico state open golf tournament, open to both amateur and professional golfers. It is organized by the Sun Country section of the PGA of America. It has been played annually since 1954 at a variety of courses around the state.

In 2011 it was hosted at Santa Ana Golf Club on the Santa Ana Pueblo, just north of Albuquerque. Rio Rancho native Tim Madigan claimed the Championship in his first professional event and also set the scoring record of 20-under par while doing so.

== Winners ==
- 2026 Jackson Funkhouser (a)
- 2025 Aidan Thomas
- 2024 Franklin Huang
- 2023 David Meyers
- 2022 Matthis Lefèvre (a)
- 2021 Sam Saunders
- 2020 No tournament
- 2019 Blake Cannon
- 2018 Sam Saunders
- 2017 Tyler Torano
- 2016 Nick Mason
- 2015 Nick Mason
- 2014 Nick Mason
- 2013 Charlie Beljan
- 2012 Wil Collins
- 2011 Tim Madigan
- 2010 Chad Saladin
- 2009 Ben Kern
- 2008 Brian Kortan
- 2007 Jaxon Brigman
- 2006 Richard Swift
- 2005 Steve Friesen
- 2004 Ryan Nietfeldt
- 2003 Michael Letzig
- 2002 Mike Sauer
- 2001 Mike Troyer
- 2000 D. J. Brigman
- 1999 Dan Koesters
- 1998 Notah Begay III
- 1997 Cameron Doan
- 1996 Mike Zaremba
- 1995 Ray Cragun
- 1994 Mike Putnam
- 1993 Mike Putnam
- 1992 Paul Stankowski
- 1991 Mark Pelletier
- 1990 Mark Pelletier
- 1989 Mike Putnam
- 1988 Mike Putnam
- 1987 John Kienle
- 1986 Steve Haskins
- 1985 Mike Putnam
- 1984 Gene Torres
- 1983 Mark Pelletier
- 1982 Ernesto Acosta
- 1981 Jim Dickson
- 1980 Don Hurter
- 1979 Pete Summerbell
- 1978 Pete Summerbell
- 1977 Joe McDermott
- 1976 Jim Marshall
- 1975 Jim Marshall
- 1974 Ben Kern
- 1973 Steve Spray
- 1972 Lee Trevino
- 1971 Gene Torres
- 1970 Gene Torres
- 1969 Gene Torres
- 1968 Ben Kern (a)
- 1967 Chuck Milne (a)
- 1966 Lee Trevino
- 1965 Sam Zimmerly (a)
- 1964 Don Klein
- 1963 Don Klein
- 1962 Herb Wimberly
- 1961 Fred Hawkins
- 1960 Herb Wimberly
- 1959 Chris Blocker (a)
- 1958 Hardy Loudermilk
- 1957 Iverson Martin
- 1956 J. D. Taylor
- 1955 J. D. Taylor
- 1954 Billy Moya (a)
- (a) denotes amateur
