= Aaron Goldberg (golfer) =

American golfer (born 1985)

Personal information
- Nationality: United States
- Born: July 19, 1985 (age 41) Encinitas, California, U.S.
- Height: 5 ft 8 in (1.73 m)
- Weight: 155 lb (70 kg; 11.1 st)
- Children: 1

Career
- Sport: Golf
- College: San Diego State University
- Turned professional: 2008
- Current tours: Nationwide Tour; Canadian Tour
- Professional wins: 3

Achievements and awards
- Canadian Tour Order of Merit winner: 2010
- ROLEX Player of the Year: 2010

Aaron Goldberg (born July 19, 1985) is an American professional golfer. He plays on the Nationwide Tour and the Canadian Tour.

== Early life and amateur career ==
In 1985, Goldberg was born in Encinitas, California.

Goldberg attended San Diego State University where he earned a Bachelor of Science in Finance. He won the U.S. Intercollegiate and the Battle at the Lake as a freshman. In his senior season he won the District 7 Shootout, defeating Boise State's Troy Merritt in a playoff. He also got an All-American honorable mention. In 2008, he represented the United States in the Palmer Cup and was a medalist at the U.S. Amateur Public Links.

== Professional career ==
In 2008, Goldberg turned professional. He joined the Canadian Tour in 2009. In 2010, he won three tournaments, the Canadian Tour Players Cup, the Clublink Jane Rogers Championship and the Canadian Tour Championship en route to winning the Canadian Tour Order of Merit. He earned $156,118 to break Trevor Dodds' single-season money record on Tour. He was also named the Canadian Tour Player of the Year. He has partial status on the Nationwide Tour in 2011. He was in contention at the Chiquita Classic going into the final round but finished in a tie for eighth.

Goldberg currently works as a Private Wealth Advisor and Certified Financial Planner Professional for AWM Capital. After a career as a professional golfer, where he says he saw "how many athletes lack financial education, leaving them to put faith in an advisor who does not understand the complexities and opportunities that being a professional athlete provides," which prompted him to enter the financial services industry with aspirations of changing the way athletes receive financial advice.

== Personal life ==
Goldberg lives in Encinitas, California with his wife Taylor and their son.

== Awards and honors ==
- While attending San Diego State University, he earned an All-American honorable mention.
- In 2010, Goldberg won the Order of Merit on the Canadian Tour.
- In 2010, he was Rolex Player of the Year.

== Professional wins (3) ==
=== Canadian Tour wins (3) ===
No.	Date	Tournament	Winning score	To par	Margin of victory	Runner(s)-up
1	Jul 18, 2010	Canadian Tour Players Cup	65-70-72-66=273	−11	1 stroke	(Canada) Jim Rutledge
2	Aug 15, 2010	Clublink Jane Rogers Championship	72-71-63-70=276	−8	Playoff	(United States) Trey Denton
3	Aug 29, 2010	Canadian Tour Championship	67-67-66-65=265	−15	6 strokes	(Canada) Mitch Gillis, (United States) Kane Hanson, (United States) Clayton Rask

== U.S. national team appearances ==
- Palmer Cup: 2008
