= Saskatchewan Amateur Women's Golf Championship =

The Saskatchewan Amateur Women's Golf Championship is the annual women's provincial golf championship, sanctioned by Golf Saskatchewan.

The championship has been held since 1914. The top three competitors from Saskatchewan earn the opportunity to represent the province at the Canadian Women's Amateur Championship.

== Winners ==
Championship	Champion	Hometown	Host course
1914	Mrs. Walter Parry	Regina	Saskatoon Golf & Country Club
1915	Mrs. G.B. Kingsley	Saskatoon	Wascana Country Club
1916	Mrs. E.S. Martin	Saskatoon	Saskatoon Golf & Country Club
1917	Mrs. H.A. Bruce	Saskatoon	Regina Golf Club
1918	Mrs. G.B. Kingsley	Regina	Wascana Country Club
1919	Miss. E. MacDonald	Saskatoon	Saskatoon Golf & Country Club
1920	Mrs. Walter Parry	Regina	Regina Golf Club
1921	Mrs. A.M. Boyd	Saskatoon	Saskatoon Golf & Country Club
1922	Mrs. J.F. Hunt	Moose Jaw	Moose Jaw Golf Club
1923	Mrs. J.F. Hunt	Moose Jaw	Regina Golf Club
1924			No championship played
1925	Mattie Boyles	Regina	Moose Jaw Golf Club
1926	Gladys Rideout	Regina	Regina Golf Club
1927	Mrs. J.F. Blair	Regina	Wascana Country Club
1928	Mrs. G.H. Yule	Saskatoon	Riverside Country Club
1929	Gladys Rideout	Regina	Moose Jaw Golf Club
1930	Gladys Rideout	Regina	Regina Golf Club
1931	Gladys Rideout	Regina	Saskatoon Golf & Country Club
1932	Mrs. D.S. Creighton	Saskatoon	Moose Jaw Golf Club
1933	Gladys Rideout	Regina	Regina Golf Club
1934	Virginia Brown	Regina	Riverside Country Club
1935	Virginia Brown	Regina	Moose Jaw Golf Club
1936	Margaret Esson	Rosetown	Wascana Country Club
1935	Gladys Rideout	Regina	Saskatoon Golf & Country Club
1938	Margaret Esson	Rosetown	Prince Albert Golf Club
1939	Mabel Palko	Regina	Regina Golf Club
1940			No championship played
1941	Margaret Esson	Rosetown	Saskatoon Golf & Country Club
1942			No championship played
1943			No championship played
1944			No championship played
1945			No championship played
1946	Rene Robbins	Regina	Prince Albert Golf Club
1947	Mabel Palko	Saskatoon	Wascana Country Club
1948	Phylis Barclay	Saskatoon	Saskatoon Golf & Country Club
1949	Rene Robbins	Regina	Regina Golf Club
1950	Mabel Palko	Saskatoon	Moose Jaw Willowdale Golf Club
1951	Phylis Barclay	Saskatoon	Prince Albert Golf Club
1952	Joanne Goulet	Regina	Riverside Country Club
1953	Rene Robbins	Regina	Wascana Country Club
1954	Gerry Evans	Saskatoon	Waskesiu Golf Course
1955	Gerry Evans	Saskatoon	Moose Jaw Willowdale Golf Club
1956	Gerry Evans	Saskatoon	Saskatoon Golf & Country Club
1957	Joanne Goulet	Regina	Regina Golf Club
1958	Joanne Goulet	Regina	Saskatoon Golf & Country Club
1959	Gerry (Evans) Yoos	Prince Albert	Prince Albert Golf Club
1960	Joanne Goulet	Regina	Riverside Country Club
1961	Joanne Goulet	Regina	Wascana Country Club
1962	Barbara Turnbull	Saskatoon	Moose Jaw Willowdale Golf Club
1963	Carolyn McLure	Saskatoon	Saskatoon Golf & Country Club
1964	Joanne Goulet	Regina	Regina Golf Club
1965	Barbara Turnbull	Saskatoon	Prince Albert Golf Club
1966	Betty Cole	Regina	Wascana Country Club
1967	Barbara Turnbull	Saskatoon	Riverside CC, Saskatoon G & CC
1968	Carolyn (McLure) Larsen	Saskatoon	Saskatoon Golf & Country Club
1969	Gerry (Evans) Yoos	Saskatoon	Regina Golf Club
1970	Barbara Drake	Saskatoon	Waskesiu Golf Course
1971	Barbara Turnbull	Saskatoon	Holiday Park Golf Course
1972	Barbara Turnbull	Saskatoon	Moose Jaw Golf Club
1973	Barbara Turnbull	Saskatoon	Cooke Municipal Golf Course
1974	Barbara Turnbull	Saskatoon	Wascana Country Club
1975	Barb (Drake) Wilson	Saskatoon	Riverside Country Club
1976	Joanne Goulet	Regina	Murray Municipal Golf Course
1977	Barbara Turnbull	Saskatoon	Deer Park Municipal Golf Course
1978	Barbara Turnbull	Saskatoon	Holiday Park Golf Course
1979	Marilyn O'Connor	Calgary, AB	Regina Golf Club
1980	Nancy Moen	Swift Current	Elmwood Golf & Country Club
1981	Joanne Goulet	Regina	Riverside Country Club
1982	Wendy Swift	Lloydminster	Cooke Municipal Golf Course
1983	Barbara (Turnbull) Danaher	Saskatoon	Saskatoon Golf & Country Club
1984	Cathy Burton	Winnipeg, MB	Wascana Country Club
1985	Joanne Goulet	Regina	Murray Golf Course
1986	Judy Medlicott	Calgary, AB	Greenbryre Golf & Country Club
1987	Jackie Twarnley	Calgary, AB	Deer Park Municipal Golf Course
1988	Marcia Littlewood	Regina	Deer Park Municipal Golf Course
1989	Kim Brozer	Melfort	North Battleford Golf & Country Club,
1990	Kim Brozer	Melfort	Wascana Country Club
1991	Kim Brozer	Melfort	Cooke Municipal Golf Course
1992	Barb (Drake) Wilson	Waskesiu Lake	Saskatoon Golf & Country Club
1993	Kim Brozer	Melfort	Lloydminster Golf & Country Club
1994	Barb (Drake) Wilson	Saskatoon	Deer Park Municipal Golf Course
1995	Kathy Ziglo	Yorkton	Nipawin Evergreen Golf & Curling Club
1996	Lynda Palahniuk	Winnipeg, MB	Royal Regina Golf Club
1997	Jolene Wood	Swift Current	The Willows Golf & Country Club
1998	Bobbi Brandon	Melfort	Golf Kenosee
1999	Bobbi Brandon	Melfort	Emerald Park Golf & Country Club
2000	Bobbi Brandon	Melfort	Elmwood Golf & Country Club
2001	Barb (Drake) Wilson	Saskatoon	Melfort Golf & Country Club
2002	Cortney Joyce	Saskatoon	Hillcrest Golf Club
2003	Tamara Harasen	Regina	Moonlake Golf & Country Club
2004	Jade Polonich	Calgary, AB	Melfort Golf & Country Club
2005	Jade Polonich	Edmonton, AB	Meadow Lake Golf & Country Club
2006	Jade Polonich	Edmonton, AB	Deer Park Municipal Golf Course
2007	Shannon McGeady	Regina	Elmwood Golf & Country Club
2008	Ashley Olynick	Saskatoon	Melfort Golf & Country Club
2009	Ashley Olynick	Saskatoon	Nipawin Evergreen Golf & Curling Club
2010	Anna Young	Saskatoon	Golf Kenosee
2011	Anna Young	Saskatoon	Lloydminster Golf & Curling Club
2012	Anna Young	Saskatoon	The Willows Golf & Country Club
2013	Anna Young	Saskatoon	Humboldt Golf Course
2014	Kimberly Risulmi	Lloydminister	Golf Kenosee
2015	Anna Young	Saskatoon	Elk Ridge Resort
2016	Kim Walker	Regina	Moon Lake Golf & Country Club
2017	Brooke Hill	Regina	Lloydminster Golf & Country Club
2018	Carla Odnokon	Saskatoon	Harbor Golf & Resort
2019	Kathy Ziglo	Saskatoon	Moon Lake Golf Club
2020	Brooklin Fry	Warman	The Legends Golf Club
2021	Ella Kozak	Swift Current	Elmwood Golf Club
2022	Brooklin Fry	Prince Albert	Cooke Municipal Golf Course
2023	Emily Cornwall	North Battleford	North Battleford Golf & Country Club
2024	Sela Ogada	Regina	Royal Regina Golf Club

=== Most victories ===
Golfer	Total	Years
Barbara (Turnbull) Danaher	10	1962, 1965, 1967, 1971, 1972, 1973, 1974, 1977, 1978, 1983
Joanne Goulet	9	1952, 1957, 1958, 1960, 1961, 1964, 1976, 1981, 1985
Gladys Rideout	6	1926, 1929, 1930, 1931, 1933, 1937
Gerry (Evans) Yoos	5	1954, 1955, 1956, 1959, 1969
Barb (Drake) Wilson	5	1970, 1975, 1992, 1994, 2001
Anna Young	5	2010, 2011, 2012, 2013, 2015
Kim Brozer	4	1989, 1990, 1991, 1993
