= Michael Letzig =

American golfer

Personal information
- Full name: Michael Richard Letzig
- Nationality: United States
- Born: May 7, 1980 (age 46) Richmond, Missouri, U.S.
- Height: 6 ft 3 in (1.91 m)
- Weight: 183 lb (83 kg; 13.1 st)

Career
- Sport: Golf
- College: University of New Mexico
- Turned professional: 2002
- Current tour: Web.com Tour
- Former tours: PGA Tour; PGA Tour Canada
- Professional wins: 5

Best results in major championships
- Masters Tournament: DNP
- PGA Championship: DNP
- U.S. Open: CUT: 2008
- The Open Championship: CUT: 2008

Michael Richard Letzig (born May 7, 1980) is an American professional golfer who has played on the PGA Tour and the Web.com Tour.

== Early life ==
In 1980, Letzig was born in Richmond, Missouri. Letzig graduated from Richmond High School in 1998, where he led the Spartans to the Class 2 state title and also won the individual state title in the process. Letzig quickly made a name for himself as a freshman in 1995 when he shot a 3-under-par 33 in his first varsity match, which still stands a Missouri state record for low 9-hole score on a par-36 course.

== Amateur career ==
While at the University of New Mexico, Letzig was chosen as a freshman All-American, and Mountain West Player of the Year in 2003. He played college golf for the University of New Mexico where he played with future fellow PGA Tour professionals Spencer Levin and Wil Collins. It was Collins that convinced Letzig to attend the University of New Mexico when they met in a junior tournament in Colorado.

== Professional career ==
In 2003, Letzig turned pro and won his first career event at the New Mexico Open. His next two professional victories took place on the NGA Hooters Tour: at the Indian Lakes Resort Classic in Illinois, and at the Statesville Classic in North Carolina. His latest victory came at the first Gateway Tour event held in 2012 in Arizona, where he completed an amazing stretch on five holes scoring two eagles and three birdies to take a two stroke victory on the final day.

Letzig earned his 2008 PGA Tour card by finishing 12th on the 2007 Nationwide Tour, and maintained his card for 2009 by finishing 93rd on the money list. He would finish in the top-10 five times during 2008. He would follow in 2009 with two top-10s at the RBC Canadian Open and a final round match up with Tiger Woods at the Buick Open. His only top-10 finish in 2010 was during the RBC Canadian Open, and in 2011 at the Reno-Tahoe Open.

Letzig has not won on the PGA Tour nor the Web.com Tour, but he came in second place at the 2008 Ginn sur Mer Classic to Ryan Palmer by a stroke. His best finish on the Web.com Tour was 2nd in 2007 at the Nationwide Tour Championship at Barona Creek.

With no status on either tour, Letzig qualified for PGA Tour Canada in 2015 with a T2 at his qualifying tournament. He earned his first win at a PGA Tour-sanctioned event at the SIGA Dakota Dunes Open.

== Amateur wins ==
- 2002 Missouri Amateur

== Professional wins (5) ==
=== PGA Tour Canada wins (1) ===
| No. | Date | Tournament | Winning score | Margin of victory | Runners-up |
|---|---|---|---|---|---|
| 1 | Jul 5, 2015 | SIGA Dakota Dunes Open | −16 (67-66-70-69=272) | Playoff | (United States) Clark Klaasen, (United States) J. J. Spaun |

=== NGA Hooters Tour wins (2) ===
| No. | Date | Tournament | Winning score | Margin of victory | Runners-up |
|---|---|---|---|---|---|
| 1 | May 14, 2006 | Indian Lakes Resort Classic | −7 (69-65=134) | 1 stroke | (United States) John Koskinen, (United States) Benjamin McClung, (United States) Andy Morse, (United States) Kevin Streelman |
| 2 | Jun 11, 2006 | Statesville Classic | −21 (65-69-66-67=267) | 3 strokes | (United States) Dustin Bray, (United States) Eric Jorgenson, (United States) Emmett Turner |

=== Gateway Tour wins (1) ===
| No. | Date | Tournament | Winning score | Margin of victory | Runners-up |
|---|---|---|---|---|---|
| 1 | Jan 19, 2012 | Tournament 1 | −13 (69-72-62=203) | 2 strokes | (United States) Brady Stockton, (United States) Drew Stoltz |

=== Other wins (1) ===
- 2003 New Mexico Open

== Results in major championships ==
| Tournament | 2008 |
|---|---|
| U.S. Open | CUT |
| The Open Championship | CUT |

CUT = missed the half-way cut
Note: Letzig never played in the Masters Tournament or the PGA Championship.

== See also ==
- 2007 Nationwide Tour graduates
- 2012 PGA Tour Qualifying School graduates
