= Bob Sowards =

American professional golfer (born 1968)

Personal information
- Full name: Robert Sowards
- Nationality: United States
- Born: June 9, 1968 (age 58) Portsmouth, Ohio, U.S.

Career
- Sport: Golf
- College: Glenville State College
- Turned professional: 1991
- Former tours: PGA Tour; Nationwide Tour
- Professional wins: 9

Best results in major championships
- Masters Tournament: DNP
- PGA Championship: CUT: 1997, 2001, 2003, 2004, 2011, 2012, 2013, 2014, 2015, 2018, 2020, 2025
- U.S. Open: DNP
- The Open Championship: DNP

Robert Sowards (born June 9, 1968) is an American professional golfer.

== Career ==
Sowards was born in Portsmouth, Ohio. He played collegiate golf at Glenville State College. He turned professional in 1991.

Sowards has worked as a club pro and has played on professional tours. He played on the Nationwide Tour in 1998 and 2009. He earned his PGA Tour card through the 2007 qualifying school and was a rookie in 2008. His best finish was a T-9 in the Wyndham Championship.

Sowards qualified for his 12th PGA Championship in 2025, tied with Steve Schneiter for the most among PGA Professionals.

== Tournament wins ==
this list may be incomplete

- 1996 Southern Ohio PGA Championship
- 2000 Southern Ohio PGA Championship
- 2001 Southern Ohio PGA Championship
- 2002 Ohio Open, Southern Ohio PGA Championship
- 2003 Southern Ohio PGA Championship
- 2004 PGA Club Professional Championship, Ohio Open
- 2010 Ohio Open

== Results in major championships ==
Tournament	1997	1998	1999
PGA Championship	CUT		

Tournament	2000	2001	2002	2003	2004	2005	2006	2007	2008	2009
PGA Championship		CUT		CUT	CUT					

Tournament	2010	2011	2012	2013	2014	2015	2016	2017	2018	2019
PGA Championship		CUT	CUT	CUT	CUT	CUT			CUT	

Tournament	2020	2021	2022	2023	2024	2025
PGA Championship	CUT					CUT

Did not play

CUT = missed the half-way cut
Note: Sowards only played in the PGA Championship.

== Results in senior major championships ==
Results not in chronological order

Tournament	2019	2020	2021	2022	2023	2024	2025	2026
Senior PGA Championship	T21	NT	T5	T70	T70	T67	T55	T59
The Tradition		NT						
U.S. Senior Open		NT			T38			
Senior Players Championship								
Senior British Open Championship		NT	T40					

Top 10
Did not play

"T" indicates a tie for a place
NT = no tournament due to COVID-19 pandemic

== U.S. national team appearances ==
- PGA Cup: 2005, 2013 (tie), 2015, 2019 (winners)

== See also ==
- 2007 PGA Tour Qualifying School graduates
