= James Balfour (mayor) =

Canadian mayor

Mayor of Regina
- In office 1915; 1931

Personal details
- Born: January 4, 1867; Mount Forest, Ontario, Canada
- Died: April 5, 1947 (aged 80); Regina, Saskatchewan, Canada
- Occupation: Lawyer, educator

James Balfour, KC (January 4, 1867 – April 6, 1947) was an educator, lawyer and political figure in Saskatchewan. He served as mayor of Regina, Saskatchewan in 1915 and 1931.

He was born in Mount Forest, Ontario, the son of William Balfour, a native of Scotland, and Agnes Martin, and was educated there. He taught school in Saskatchewan for a time. In 1883, he went to Calgary, Alberta, where he was employed in lumbering for two years. He returned to Regina in 1885, teaching school there and then in Battleford. He began the study of law in 1892 and was called to the bar for the Northwest Territories in 1895. In 1892, he married Agnes Hayes. In 1911, he was named King's Counsel. He served as a member of the board for the Regina Hospital from 1902 to 1905, as a member of the board for Regina Collegiate Institute for over 15 years and was president of the YMCA from 1907 to 1912. He died of a stroke in 1947 and was buried at the Regina Cemetery.

Balfour Collegiate was named in his honour. The Balfour Trophy, awarded annually to the champion of the Saskatchewan Amateur Men's Golf Championship is also named after him.

His grandson R. James Balfour later joined the law firm founded by Balfour in 1895 and served in the House of Commons of Canada and Senate.
