= Bob Shave =

American professional golfer

Bob Shave Jr.
Personal information
- Full name: Robert James Shave Jr.
- Nationality: United States
- Born: c.1936 Willoughby, Ohio, U.S.
- Height: 5 ft 10 in (1.78 m)
- Weight: 170 lb (77 kg; 12 st)

Career
- Sport: Golf
- College: Florida State University
- Turned professional: 1960
- Professional wins: 4

Best results in major championships
- Masters Tournament: DNP
- PGA Championship: T49: 1966
- U.S. Open: T26: 1966
- The Open Championship: DNP

Robert James Shave Jr. (born c.1936) is an American professional golfer.

Shave was born in Willoughby, Ohio. He played college golf at Florida State University, where he was a 2nd-Team All-American.

He played on the PGA Tour for six years, and had 21 top-10 finishes. In other professional outings, he won the Ohio Open three times, as well as the Pennsylvania Open Championship.

He later coached golf at Florida International University along with Bill Mehlhorn. Mehlhorn and Shave wrote the book, Golf Secrets Exposed, in the early 1980s to summarize Mehlhorn's golf secrets and insight. Shave was elected into the Florida State Hall of Fame in 2009. He also demonstrated the Mehnhorn golf techniques and exercises in videos on his youtube channel.

== Amateur wins ==
- 1956 Northeast Ohio Amateur Championship
- 1958 Northeast Ohio Amateur Championship
- 1959 Northeast Ohio Amateur Championship
- 1959 Pensacola Invitational

== Professional wins (4) ==
- 1958 Ohio Open (as an amateur)
- 1962 Ohio Open
- 1963 Ohio Open
- 1965 Pennsylvania Open Championship
