= Saskatchewan Amateur Men's Golf Championship =

Golf tournament

The Saskatchewan Amateur Men's Golf Championship is an annual men's provincial golf championship sanctioned by Golf Saskatchewan.

The championship has been held since 1908. The annual champion is awarded the James Balfour Trophy, named after the former mayor of Regina, James Balfour. The top three competitors earn the opportunity to represent Saskatchewan in the Willingdon Cup team championship, while competing at the Canadian Amateur Championship.

== Winners ==
Year	Champion	Host course
1908	William S. Gray	Regina Golf Club
1909	J.H.H. Young	Regina Golf Club
1910	Rev. D. Richie	Regina Golf Club
1911	G.F. Donaldson	Regina Golf Club
1912	G.F. Donaldson	
1913	William S. Gray	Wascana Country Club
1914	G.F. Donaldson	Riverside Country Club
1915	W. Laidlaw	Wascana Country Club
1916	Henry A. Bruce	Saskatoon Golf & Country Club
1917	John "Jack" T. Cuthbert	Regina Golf Club
1918	John "Jack" T. Cuthbert	Wascana Country Club
1919	John "Jack" T. Cuthbert	Saskatoon Golf & Country Club
1920	Alex "Sandy" A. Weir	Regina Golf Club
1921	Henry A. Bruce	Saskatoon Golf & Country Club
1922	Henry A. Bruce	Moose Jaw Golf Club
1923	C.P. Church	Wascana Country Club
1924	Alex "Sandy" A. Weir	Riverside Country Club
1925	Tom Russel	Moose Jaw Golf Club
1926	J.R. Smith	Regina Golf Club
1927	Tom Russel	Moose Jaw Golf Club
1928	Phil Morse	Saskatoon Golf & Country Club
1929	Phil Morse	Wascana Country Club
1930	Tom Russel	Moose Jaw Golf Club
1931	Phil Morse	Riverside Country Club
1932	Jack Millar	Regina Golf Club
1933	Dr. George B. Bigelow	Saskatoon Golf & Country Club
1934	Ken Smith	Regina Golf Club
1935	Dr. George B. Bigelow	Moose Jaw Golf Club
1936	Robert Reid	Prince Albert Golf Club
1935	Arnold Lozo	Riverside Country Club
1938	Dr. George B. Bigelow	Waskesiu Golf Course
1939	George Henry (Harry) Burns	Regina Golf Club
1940	George Henry (Harry) Burns	Moose Jaw Golf Club
1941	Capt. Robert Reid	Saskatoon Golf & Country Club
1942		No championship played
1943		No championship played
1944		No championship played
1945		No championship played
1946	Dr. Robert Reid	Regina Golf Club
1947	Geoffrey Cooke	Saskatoon Golf & Country Club
1948	Claude Shackell	Prince Albert Golf Club
1949	Cliff Soberg	Moose Jaw Willowdale Golf Club
1950	Dr. Robert Reid	Riverside Country Club
1951	George Henry (Harry) Burns	Wascana Country Club
1952	Dr. Robert Reid	Waskesiu Golf Course
1953	Wilf Homenuik	Regina Golf Club/Wascana Country Club
1954	Morris Thompson	Saskatoon Golf & Country Club
1955	Douglas Silverberg	Prince Albert Golf Club
1956	Dr. Doug McAlpine	Moose Jaw Willowdale Golf Club
1957	Del Wilson	Riverside Country Club
1958	Dr. Doug McAlpine	Regina Golf Club
1959	Keith Rever	Saskatoon Golf & Country Club
1960	Dave Slinn	Regina Golf Club
1961	Jim Scissons	Prince Albert Golf Club
1962	Keith Rever	Moose Jaw Willowdale Golf Club
1963	Jim Scissons	Saskatoon Golf & Country Club
1964	Ed Ross	Regina Golf Club
1965	Ron Folk	Saskatoon Golf & Country Club
1966	Ernie Greenley	Regina Golf Club
1967	Jim Scissons	Prince Albert Golf Club
1968	Gabe Sebastian	Murray Golf Course
1969	Jim Scissons	Riverside Country Club
1970	Jim Scissons	Wascana Country Club
1971	Rick Folk	Swift Current Golf Club
1972	Rick Folk	Riverside Country Club
1973	Barry Grosse	Saskatoon Golf & Country Club
1974	Brian Bamford	Regina Golf Club
1975	Mike Volk	Riverside Country Club
1976	Mike Zichy	Wascana Country Club
1977	Ron Stewart	Saskatoon Golf & Country Club
1978	Bill Hobbis	Elmwood Golf & Country Club
1979	Roy Abbenbroek	Cooke Municipal Golf Course
1980	Roy Abbenbroek	Regina Golf Club
1981	Jim Flemming	Holiday Park Golf Course
1982	Ken Newman	Cooke Municipal Golf Course
1983	Darren Veitch	Elmwood Golf & Country Club
1984	Rod Bulmer	Melfort Golf & Country Club
1985	Brad Birnie	North Battleford Golf & Country Club
1986	Brad Birnie	Murray Municipal Golf Course
1987	Ron Stewart	Cooke Municipal Golf Course
1988	Randy Folk	Saskatoon Golf & Country Club
1989	Arden Knoll	Lloydminster Golf & Country Club
1990	Arden Knoll	Regina Golf Club
1991	Kent Fukushima	Deer Park Municipal Golf Course
1992	Kent Fukushima	Elmwood Golf & Country Club
1993	Vince Ramscar	North Battleford Golf & Country Club
1994	Jim Scissons	Moonlake Golf & Country Club
1995	Colin Coben	Cooke Municipal Golf Course
1996	Karl Parrington	The Willows Golf & Country Club
1997	Colin Coben	Melfort Golf & Country Club
1998	Dennis Vezeau	Nipawin Evergreen Golf & Curling Club
1999	Wayne Fairbairn	Lloydminster Golf & Country Club
2000	Lindsay Bernakevitch	Wascana Country Club
2001	Lindsay Bernakevitch	Saskatoon Golf & Country Club
2002	Lindsay Bernakevitch	Nipawin Evergreen Golf & Curling Club
2003	Lindsay Bernakevitch	Riverside Country Club
2004	Karl Parrington	North Battleford Golf & Country Club
2005	Graham DeLaet	Wascana Country Club
2006	Graham DeLaet	Estevan Woodlawn Golf Club
2007	Ron Stewart	Cooke Municipal Golf Course
2008	David Stewart	Royal Regina Golf Club
2009	Scott Thompson	Lloydminster Golf & Country Club
2010	Scott Thompson	The Willows Golf & Country Club
2011	Troy Bulmer	The Legends Golf Club
2012	Tyler Frank	Deer Park Municipal Golf Course
2013	David Stewart	Melfort Golf & Country Club
2014	Martin Ring	Cooke Municipal Golf Course
2015	Charles Boyechko	TS&M Woodlawn Golf Club
2016	Justin Wood	The Legends Golf Club
2017	Tyler Wright	Deer Park Municipal Golf Course
2018	Kade Johnson	Dakota Dunes Golf Links
2019	Danny Klughart	Saskatoon Golf & Country Club
2020	Ty Campbell	The Legends Golf Club
2021	Roman Timmerman	Elmwood Golf Club
2022	Roman Timmerman	Cooke Municipal Golf Club
2023	Josh Nagy	North Battleford Golf & Country Club
2024	Kye Fisher	Royal Regina Golf Club

=== Most wins ===
Golfer	Wins	Years
Jim Scissons	6	1961, 1963, 1967, 1969, 1970, 1994
Robert Reid	5	1936, 1941, 1946, 1950, 1952
Lindsay Bernakevitch	4	2000, 2001, 2002, 2003
G.F. Donaldson	3	1911, 1912, 1914
Henry A. Bruce	3	1916, 1921, 1922
John "Jack" T. Cuthbert	3	1917, 1918, 1919
Tom Russel	3	1925, 1927, 1930
Phil Morse	3	1928, 1929, 1931
Dr. George B. Bigelow	3	1933, 1935, 1938
Harry Burns	3	1939, 1940, 1951
Ron Stewart	3	1977, 1987, 2007
