= Stephen Gangluff =

American golfer

Personal information
- Full name: Stephen O. Gangluff
- Nationality: United States
- Born: September 6, 1975 (age 51) Marysville, Ohio, U.S.
- Height: 5 ft 8 in (1.73 m)
- Weight: 195 lb (88 kg; 13.9 st)

Career
- Sport: Golf
- College: Ohio State University
- Turned professional: 1996
- Former tours: PGA Tour; Nationwide Tour; Canadian Tour
- Professional wins: 6

Best results in major championships
- Masters Tournament: DNP
- PGA Championship: DNP
- U.S. Open: T40: 2006
- The Open Championship: DNP

Achievements and awards
- Canadian Tour Order of Merit winner: 2006

Stephen O. Gangluff (born September 6, 1975) is an American professional golfer.

== Career ==
Gangluff was born in Marysville, Ohio. He played college golf at Ohio State University. He turned professional in 1996.

Gangluff played on the Nationwide Tour in 2003, 2004, 2007, and 2011. His best finish was T-3 at the 2007 Preferred Health Systems Wichita Open. He also played on the Canadian Tour, winning three times and leading the Order of Merit in 2006. He played on the PGA Tour in 2002 and 2012, both times earning his card through Q School. His best finish is T-19 at the 2002 FedEx St. Jude Classic.

After failing to get any noticeable results in the U.S., Gangluff returned to the Canadian Tour. He won the season's first event of 2013, the Times Colonist Island Savings Open.

== Professional wins (6) ==
=== PGA Tour Canada wins (4) ===
No.	Date	Tournament	Winning score	Margin of victory	Runner(s)-up
1	Jun 13, 2004	Lewis Chitengwa Memorial Championship	−13 (72-66-68-69=275)	2 strokes	(United States) Dirk Ayers, (United States) Erik Compton, (Canada) Wes Heffernan, (United States) Rob Labritz, (United States) Chris Wollmann
2	Jul 2, 2006	Telus Edmonton Open	−16 (72-65-66-69=272)	Playoff	(United States) Brendan Steele
3	Aug 23, 2006	Fallsview Casino Resort Pro-Am Classic	−14 (70-68-66-70=274)	7 strokes	(United States) Brock Mackenzie
4	Jun 9, 2013	Times Colonist Island Savings Open	−19 (69-68-66-66=269)	2 strokes	(United States) Tyler Aldridge

=== Other wins (2) ===
- 2018 Ohio Open
- 2019 Ohio Open

== See also ==
- 2001 PGA Tour Qualifying School graduates
- 2011 PGA Tour Qualifying School graduates
