= ATB Classic =

Golf tournament

The ATB Financial Classic is a golf tournament on PGA Tour Americas. It was first played in 2007 as the ATB Financial Classic , and was merged with the Edmonton Open in 2010. From 2007 to 2015, it was played at a different course in Alberta each year. From 2016 to 2021, it was played at Country Hills Golf Club in Calgary. In 2022, it moved to Edmonton Petroleum Golf and Country Club in Edmonton. From 2023 to 2025, it was played at the Northern Bear Golf Club in Strathcona County, Alberta.

The main sponsor is ATB Financial.

== Winners ==
Year	Winner	Country	Venue	Location
ATB Classic
2026			Northern Bear GC	Strathcona County, Alberta
2025	Michael Brennan	United States	Northern Bear GC	Strathcona County, Alberta
2024	Frederik Kjettrup	Denmark	Northern Bear GC	Strathcona County, Alberta
2023	Davis Lamb	United States	Northern Bear GC	Strathcona County, Alberta
2022	Wil Bateman	Canada	Edmonton Petroleum G&CC	Edmonton, Alberta
ATB Financial Classic
2021	Jared du Toit	Canada	Country Hills GC	Calgary, Alberta
2020	No tournament			
2019	Hayden Buckley	United States	Country Hills GC	Calgary, Alberta
2018	Corey Pereira	United States	Country Hills GC	Calgary, Alberta
2017	Chase Wright	United States	Country Hills GC	Calgary, Alberta
2016	Charlie Bull	England	Country Hills GC	Calgary, Alberta
2015	Daniel Miernicki	United States	The Links of GlenEagles	Cochrane, Alberta
2014	Brock Mackenzie	United States	Sirocco GC	Calgary, Alberta
2013	Joe Panzeri	United States	Country Hills GC	Calgary, Alberta
2012	Michael Gligic	Canada	Windermere G&CC	Edmonton, Alberta
2011	Hugo León	Chile	Bearspaw CC	Calgary, Alberta
2010	Dustin Risdon	Canada	Edmonton CC	Edmonton, Alberta
2009	Graham DeLaet	Canada	Sirocco GC	Calgary, Alberta
2008	Dustin Risdon	Canada	Cottonwood G&CC	De Winton, Alberta
2007	Mike Grob	United States	The Winston GC	Calgary, Alberta
