= Breezy Bend Country Club =

Golf course in Winnipeg, Manitoba

Coordinates: 49.856°N 97.371°W

- Interactive map of Breezy Bend Country Club

Club information
- Location: 7620 Roblin Blvd, Headingley, MB R4H 1C9
- Established: 1960
- Type: Private
- Total holes: 18
- Tournaments: The Manitoba Open on the PGA Tour Americas (7 time host) and The Canadian Mid-Amateur Championships, both men's and women's
- Website: https://breezybend.ca/
- Designer: Jack McMahon
- Par: 72
- Length: 6,767 yards (6,188 m)
- Course rating: 72.7
- Slope rating: 127
- Course record: 64 (Bob Panasiuk)

Breezy Bend Country Club is an 18-hole private golf course just west of the city of Winnipeg, Manitoba. The course was opened in 1960 and was designed by Jack McMahon, who built the golf course on his own farm land.

Breezy Bend Country Club has hosted the Manitoba Open, having hosted the championship in 1969, 1975, 1981, 1991, 1992, 1993, and 2025. The course is among 5 courses in the province that now host the professional tournament on a rotation.

== History ==
Upon its opening in 1960, Breezy Bend was initially a public golf course charging $1.50 per round, or $30 for a season pass to play at the 18-hole course. The following year, McMahon received bids to sell the rest of his property surrounding the golf course for housing development and to turn the course into a private escape for wealthy Winnipeggers just outside the city. By 1969 professional golf arrived at Breezy Bend as the club hosted its fist Manitoba Open.

By 1972, golf course architect Geoffrey S. Cornish surveyed the course and proposed a long-range plan for the development of Breezy Bend into the general shape the course is today, with only minor renovations to holes 12 and 14 and the t boxes near the new clubhouse built in 2008.

For over 40 years, Breezy Bend Country Club's head professional was Manitoba Golf Hall of Famer Sandy Paterson.

During the clubs construction and redevelopments, several Indigenous artifacts have been found on the grounds.

== Manitoba Open ==
The Manitoba Open has been hosted at Breezy Bend County Club seven times. Champions are as follows:

Year	Venue	Winner	Score	Ref
CentrePort Canada Rail Park Manitoba Open
2025	Breezy Bend CC	(United States) Theo Humphrey	131 (−11) (Note: Weather-shortened to 36 holes.)	
Xerox Manitoba Open
1993	Breezy Bend G&CC	(Canada) Frank Edmonds	270	
1992	Breezy Bend G&CC	(United States) Chris Patton	265	
Manitoba Open
1991	Breezy Bend G&CC	(United States) Kelly Gibson	267	
1981	Breezy Bend G&CC	(United States) Dan Croonquist	207	
1975	Breezy Bend G&CC	(United States) Ed Byman	208	
1969	Breezy Bend G&CC	(United States) Mike Reasor	209	

== Scorecard ==
Tee	Rating/Slope	1	2	3	4	5	6	7	8	9	Out	10	11	12	13	14	15	16	17	18	In	Total
Par		4	5	4	5	3	4	3	4	4	36	4	5	4	3	4	5	3	4	4	36	72
Black	M:72.7 / 127	374	524	365	528	173	403	136	425	362	3,290	363	512	410	165	387	561	208	388	468	3,462	6,752
Blue	M:71.5 / 125	365	514	357	505	171	395	125	411	341	3,184	359	492	397	150	356	549	190	374	459	3,326	6,510
White	M:70.6 / 122 W:76.7 / 133	354	506	348	494	164	384	114	394	329	3,087	348	488	385	136	334	533	179	361	449	3,213	6,300
Red	M:68.2 / 121	340	454	339	436	159	378	98	322	308	2,834	340	472	337	124	292	446	158	353	440	2,962	5,796

== See also ==
- List of golf courses in Manitoba
