= John Ellis (golfer) =

American professional golfer (born 1979)

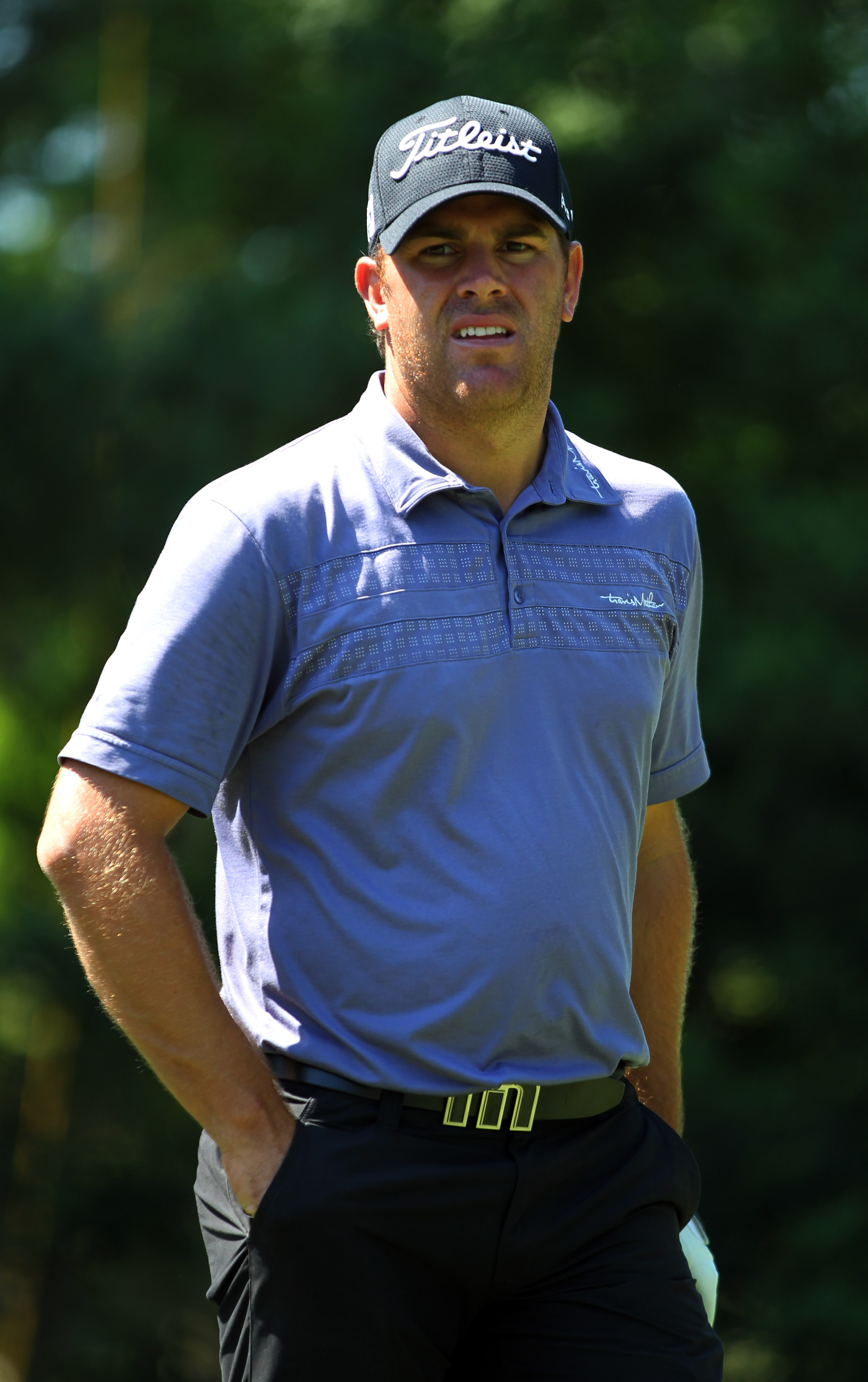
- Ellis in 2011

Personal information
- Nationality: United States
- Born: October 8, 1979 (age 47) San Jose, California, U.S.
- Height: 5 ft 11 in (1.80 m)
- Weight: 195 lb (88 kg; 13.9 st)

Career
- Sport: Golf
- College: University of Oregon
- Turned professional: 2003
- Current tour: Canadian Tour
- Professional wins: 9

Best results in major championships
- Masters Tournament: DNP
- PGA Championship: DNP
- U.S. Open: CUT: 2008, 2011
- The Open Championship: DNP

Achievements and awards
- Canadian Tour Order of Merit winner: 2008

John Ellis (born October 8, 1979) is an American caddie and former professional golfer.

== Career ==
Ellis was born in San Jose, California. He played college golf at the University of Oregon where he was a First-Team All Pac-10 member as a senior. He turned professional in 2003. Ellis won the Canadian Tour's Order of Merit in 2008. He won three events that year, the Stockton Sports Commission Classic, the Corona Mazatlan Mexican PGA Championship and the Telus Edmonton Open. He won the 2009 GST – Lamkin Tour Championship on the Golden State Golf Tour.

After his playing career ended, Ellis coached and caddied for Wyndham Clark, who also attended the University of Oregon. Ellis was on Clark's bag for eight years, which included a victory at the 2023 U.S. Open. Ellis and Clark parted ways in March 2026. Ellis then caddied for Tony Finau beginning in April, before switching to Max Homa in June.

== Professional wins (9) ==
=== Canadian Tour wins (3) ===
No.	Date	Tournament	Winning score	Margin of victory	Runner(s)-up
1	Apr 20, 2008	Stockton Sports Commission Classic	−16 (68-65-70-69=272)	Playoff	(United States) Tommy Barber
2	Apr 27, 2008	Corona Mazatlán Mexican PGA Championship	−15 (62-69-71-71=273)	1 stroke	(Australia) Adam Bland, (Canada) Wes Heffernan
3	Jul 13, 2008	Telus Edmonton Open	−18 (66-68-65-67=266)	3 strokes	(Canada) Andrew Parr

=== Other wins (6) ===
- 2004 Northern California Open
- 2005 AG Spanos California Open
- 2009 GST – Lamkin Tour Championship (Golden State Golf Tour), Monterey Open Championship
- 2011 Hawaii Pearl Open, California State Open

== Results in major championships ==
Tournament	2008	2009	2010	2011
U.S. Open	CUT			CUT

Did not play

CUT = missed the half-way cut
"T" = tied
Note: Ellis only played in the U.S. Open.
