= Daniel Im =

American golfer (born 1985)

Personal information
- Full name: Daniel Jae Hong Im
- Nationality: United States
- Born: April 5, 1985 (age 41) Wayne, New Jersey, U.S.
- Height: 5 ft 11 in (1.80 m)
- Weight: 169 lb (77 kg; 12.1 st)

Career
- Sport: Golf
- College: UCLA
- Turned professional: 2008
- Current tour: European Tour
- Former tours: Challenge Tour; Canadian Tour
- Professional wins: 3

Number of wins by tour
- Challenge Tour: 1
- Other: 2

Daniel Jae Hong Im (born April 5, 1985) is an American professional golfer.

== Career ==
Im was born in Wayne, New Jersey. He played college golf at UCLA where he won the Pac-10 Conference championship in 2006.

Im played on the Canadian Tour in 2008, winning two events, finishing third on the Order of Merit, and was named the International Rookie of the Year. In 2009, he finished 25th on the Order of Merit.

Im played on the Challenge Tour in 2013, making 17 cuts in 23 events and finishing 17th on the tour rankings. His best finish was tied for second at the Norwegian Challenge. He played primarily on the European Tour in 2014, making 15 cuts in 21 events. His best finish was tied for seventh at the Lyoness Open. He returned to the Challenge Tour in 2015 and won the Swiss Challenge in June.

== Professional wins (3) ==
=== Challenge Tour wins (1) ===
No.	Date	Tournament	Winning score	Margin of victory	Runner-up
1	Jun 7, 2015	Swiss Challenge	−11 (74-66-68-65=273)	Playoff	(England) Gary Boyd

Challenge Tour playoff record (1–0)

No.	Year	Tournament	Opponent	Result
1	2015	Swiss Challenge	(England) Gary Boyd	Won with birdie on first extra hole

=== Canadian Tour wins (2) ===
No.	Date	Tournament	Winning score	Margin of victory	Runner(s)-up
1	May 18, 2008	Iberostar Riviera Maya Open	−11 (67-69-72-69=277)	1 stroke	(United States) Brent Schwarzrock, (Mexico) Óscar Serna
2	Jun 15, 2008	Times Colonist Open	−12 (66-72-62-68=268)	Playoff	(Canada) James Lepp

== See also ==
- 2015 European Tour Qualifying School graduates
