= Byron Smith (golfer) =

American golfer (born 1981)

Personal information
- Nationality: United States
- Born: 31 March 1981 (age 45) Palm Springs, California, U.S.
- Height: 6 ft 0 in (1.83 m)
- Weight: 185 lb (84 kg; 13.2 st)
- Spouse: Amber Smith
- Children: 1

Career
- Sport: Golf
- College: Pepperdine University
- Turned professional: 2001
- Former tours: PGA Tour; Web.com Tour; Canadian Tour
- Professional wins: 5

Number of wins by tour
- Korn Ferry Tour: 1

Achievements and awards
- Canadian Tour Order of Merit winner: 2007

Byron Smith (born March 31, 1981) is an American professional golfer who currently plays on the PGA Tour.

== Early life and amateur career ==
Smith was born in Palm Springs, California and attended Pepperdine University. He did not play golf during his last two years at Pepperdine.

== Professional career ==
In 2001, Smith turned professional. In 2005, he first played on the Canadian Tour but did not break through until 2007. In his 2007 Canadian Tour season, he won twice, recorded five top-10 finishes, earned over $89,000 in earnings and won the Order of Merit title. The Order of Merit title win gave Smith a five-year exemption on the Canadian Tour. After a winless 2008 season, Smith won his 3rd Canadian Tour event at the Times Colonist Open in 2009. He has also played on the Hooters Tour where he finished in the top-10 of the money list in 2004. He lost in a playoff of a Spanos Tour event in 2005.

Smith played on the Web.com Tour in 2014 and earned his first Tour win at the Rex Hospital Open. He finished 42nd in the Web.com Tour Finals to earn his PGA Tour card for the 2014–15 season.

== Professional wins (5) ==
=== Web.com Tour wins (1) ===
No.	Date	Tournament	Winning score	To par	Margin of victory	Runners-up
1	May 25, 2014	Rex Hospital Open	70-69-63-66=268	−16	4 strokes	(Australia) Scott Gardiner, (United States) Harold Varner III

=== Canadian Tour wins (4) ===
No.	Date	Tournament	Winning score	To par	Margin of victory	Runner(s)-up
1	Apr 29, 2007	Corona Mazatlán Classic	66-70-66-67=269	−19	3 strokes	(Canada) Scott Hawley
2	Aug 26, 2007	Jane Rogers Championship of Mississauga	70-65-66-63=264	−16	1 stroke	(Canada) Derek Gillespie
3	Jun 7, 2009	Times Colonist Open	68-69-66-64=267	−13	1 stroke	(Canada) Brady Johnson (a), (Canada) Jim Rutledge
4	Nov 6, 2011	Desert Dunes Classic	71-68-67-66=272	−16	2 strokes	(United States) Kent Eger

== See also ==
- 2014 Web.com Tour Finals graduates
