= Harold Eidsvig =

Canadian golfer

Personal information
- Nickname: Hal
- Nationality: Canada
- Born: February 26, 1915 St. James-Assiniboia, Manitoba, Canada
- Died: December 1, 1959 (aged 44) Winnipeg, Manitoba, Canada
- Height: 6 ft 0 in (1.83 m)
- Weight: 200 lb (91 kg; 14 st)
- Spouse: Doreen Eidsvig (Davy) (m. 1944)
- Children: Mark Harold Eidsvig

Career
- Sport: Golf
- Turned professional: 1947

Achievements and awards
- Manitoba Sports Hall of Fame: 2004
- Manitoba Golf Hall of Fame: 2015

Harold "Hal" Eidsvig (February 26, 1915 – December 1, 1959) was a Canadian professional golfer who captured two Manitoba Amateur championships and four Manitoba Open titles in less than a decade.

Eidsvig was inducted into the Manitoba Sports Hall of Fame and Museum in 2004.

== Tournament wins ==
- 1946 Manitoba Amateur
- 1947 Manitoba Amateur, Manitoba Open
- 1949 Manitoba Open
- 1952 Manitoba Open
- 1955 Manitoba Open

== Achievements and awards ==
- Inducted into the Manitoba Sports Hall of Fame and Museum in 2004.
- Inducted into the Manitoba Golf Hall of Fame in 2015.
- Low amateur trophy for Manitoba Open named after him.
