= Wes Heffernan =

Canadian professional golfer

Personal information
- Nationality: Canada
- Born: 7 March 1977 (age 49) Calgary, Alberta, Canada
- Height: 6 ft 01 in (1.85 m)
- Weight: 180 lb (82 kg; 13 st)

Career
- Sport: Golf
- College: Mount Royal College; University of Calgary
- Turned professional: 2000
- Current tour: Canadian Tour
- Professional wins: 14

Best results in major championships
- Masters Tournament: DNP
- PGA Championship: DNP
- U.S. Open: 71: 2011
- The Open Championship: DNP

Wes Heffernan (born 7 March 1977) is a Canadian professional golfer.

== Early life and amateur career ==
In 1977, Heffernan was born in Calgary, Alberta. He attended Mount Royal College and the University of Calgary.

In 2000, Heffernan won the Alberta Amateur Championship a year after he finished runner-up in the Canadian Amateur Championship.

== Professional career ==
In 2000, Heffernan turned professional at the Bell Canadian Open. In 2006, he recorded his first victory on the Canadian Tour at the Casino de Montreal Open for the Players Championship. He would add three more wins after that between 2007 and 2008.

Heffernan has won the Alberta Open seven times: in 2006, 2007, 2008, 2011, 2012, 2018, and 2024.

Heffernan has played in two major championships: the 2001 U.S. Open and the 2011 U.S. Open. At the 2011 event, Heffernan's back nine in the second round of 5-under-par (31) allowed him to make his first cut in a major.

In 2022, Heffernan won the 100th playing of the BetRegal PGA Championship of Canada. It was held at Beacon Hall Golf Club in Aurora, Ontario.

== Amateur wins ==
- 2000 Alberta Amateur Championship

== Professional wins (14) ==
=== Canadian Tour wins (4) ===
No.	Date	Tournament	Winning score	Margin of victory	Runner(s)-up
1	Aug 6, 2006	Casino de Montreal Open	−18 (66-63-69-72=270)	Playoff	(United States) Brock Mackenzie
2	Apr 22, 2007	Northern California Classic	−16 (70-66-65-67=268)	1 stroke	(United States) John Ellis, (United States) Joseph Lanza
3	May 13, 2007	River Nayarit Classic	−18 (71-62-65-68=266)	5 strokes	(United States) Anthony Rodriguez, (Canada) Adam Speirs
4	Jul 20, 2008	Canadian Tour Players Cup	−14 (69-67-68-66=270)	1 stroke	(Canada) Dustin Risdon

=== Other wins (10) ===
- 2006 Alberta Open
- 2007 Alberta Open
- 2008 Alberta Open
- 2011 Alberta Open
- 2012 Alberta Open
- 2018 Alberta Open
- 2019 PGA Assistants' Championship of Canada
- 2022 BetRegal PGA Championship of Canada
- 2024 Alberta Open, PGA Assistants' Championship of Canada

== Results in major championships ==
Tournament	2001	2002	2003	2004	2005	2006	2007	2008	2009	2010	2011
Masters Tournament											
U.S. Open	CUT										71
The Open Championship											
PGA Championship											

Did not play

CUT = missed the half-way cut

== Team appearances ==
Amateur

- Eisenhower Trophy (representing Canada): 2000

Professional

- World Cup (representing Canada): 2007, 2008
