= Jane Rogers Championship =

The Jane Rogers Championship was a golf tournament on the Canadian Tour from 2007 to 2010 that was held in the Greater Toronto Area. It was originally hosted at Lakeview Golf Club, Mississauga before moving to Greystone Golf Club, Halton Hills in 2009.

== Host courses ==
- 2007–08 Lakeview Golf Club, Mississauga, Ontario
- 2009–10 Greystone Golf Club, Halton Hills, Ontario

== Winners ==
Clublink Jane Rogers Championship

- 2010 (United States) Aaron Goldberg

Roxul Jane Rogers Championship

- 2009 (Canada) Ryan Yip

Jane Rogers Championship of Mississauga

- 2008 (United States) Alex Coe
- 2007 (United States) Byron Smith
