= Montreal Open (golf) =

Tournament information
- Location: Greater Montreal, Quebec, Canada
- Established: 2004
- Tour: Canadian Tour
- Format: Stroke play
- Final year: 2009

Tournament record score
- Aggregate: 263 Stuart Anderson (2009)
- To par: −24 Brent Schwarzrock (2007)

Final champion
- (Canada) Stuart Anderson

The Montreal Open (French: Open de Montréal) was a golf tournament on the Canadian Tour that was held in the Greater Montreal area, Quebec, Canada between 2004 and 2009.

Founded as the Greater Montreal Open in 2004, the event was sponsored by Lexus the following year and titled the Lexus Montreal Open. In 2006, Montreal Casino was the title sponsor and the tournament was designated as the Canadian Tour's "Players Championship". Between 2007 until it ended in 2009, it was sponsored by the Desjardins Group and titled as the Desjardins Montreal Open.

An earlier event with the same name was played in 1945 and won by Byron Nelson.

== Winners ==
Year	Venue	Winner	Score	Ref
Desjardins Montreal Open
2009	Saint-Raphaël	(Canada) Stuart Anderson	263 (−21)	
2008	Saint-Raphaël	(Canada) Graham DeLaet	274 (−10) (Note: DeLaet won after a sudden-death playoff.)	
2007	Saint-Raphaël	(United States) Brent Schwarzrock	264 (−24) (Note: Schwarzrock won with a birdie on the first hole of a sudden-death playoff.)	
Casino de Montreal Open for the Players Championship
2006	Quatre Domaines	(Canada) Wes Heffernan	270 (−18) (Note: Heffernan won on the first hole of a sudden-death playoff.)	
Lexus Montreal Open
2005	Île de Montréal	(United States) Peter Tomasulo	274 (−6)	
Greater Montreal Open
2004	Île de Montréal	(Canada) Stephen Woodard	206 (−4) (Note: Tournament reduced to 54 holes after the third round was cancelled.)	
