= Manitoba Open =

Golf tournament

Tournament information
- Location: Manitoba, Canada
- Established: 1919
- Course: Breezy Bend CC
- Tour: PGA Tour Americas
- Format: Stroke play
- Prize fund: US$225,000
- Month played: August

Current champion
- (Sweden) Daniel Svärd

The Manitoba Open is a golf tournament on PGA Tour Americas that is held in Manitoba, Canada. It was first played from 1919 to 1925 and then from 1931 to 1997 before adopting a new name in 1998. After several further name changes, the tournament readopted its original title for 2020.

From 1998 to 2006 it was known as the MTS Classic, then as the Free Press Manitoba Classic in 2007, and from 2008 to 2012 as the Canadian Tour Players Cup, which was shortened to Players Cup in 2013.

Starting in 2025, the PGA Tour America's announced that the Manitoba Open will be hosted on a rotation of 5 courses moving forward, featuring Breezy Bend Country Club, Elmhurst Golf & Country Club, Glendale Golf & Country Club, Pine Ridge Golf Club, and Southwood Golf & Country Club.

== Winners ==
| Year | Venue | Winner | Score | Ref |
Manitoba Open
| 2026 | Elmhurst G&CC | (Sweden) Daniel Svärd | 266 (−14) | |
CentrePort Canada Rail Park Manitoba Open
| 2025 | Breezy Bend CC | (United States) Theo Humphrey | 131 (−11) (Note: Weather-shortened to 36 holes.) | |
| 2024 | Southwood G&CC | (United States) Johnny Keefer | 262 (−26) | |
| 2023 | Southwood G&CC | (United States) Hayden Springer | 267 (−21) | |
| 2022 | Southwood G&CC | (United States) Parker Coody | 261 (−27) | |
| 2020–21 | Southwood G&CC | No tournament | | |
The Players Cup
| 2019 | Southwood G&CC | (United States) Derek Barron | 274 (−14) | |
| 2018 | Southwood G&CC | (United States) Tyler McCumber | 266 (−22) | |
| 2017 | Pine Ridge GC | (United States) Kramer Hickok | 269 (−15) | |
| 2016 | Niakwa CC | (United States) Dan McCarthy | 259 (−25) | |
| 2015 | Pine Ridge GC | (Taiwan) Pan Cheng-tsung | 269 (−15) | |
| 2014 | Pine Ridge GC | (United States) Tim Madigan | 275 (−9) | |
| 2013 | Pine Ridge GC | (United States) Carlos Sainz Jr. | 271 (−17) | |
Canadian Tour Players Cup
| 2012 | Pine Ridge GC | (United States) Chris Killmer | 269 (−15) (Note: Killmer on the fourth hole of a sudden-death playoff.) | |
| 2011 | Pine Ridge GC | (United States) Tom Hoge | 268 (−16) | |
| 2010 | Pine Ridge GC | (United States) Aaron Goldberg | 273 (−11) | |
| 2009 | Pine Ridge GC | (Canada) Graham DeLaet | 276 | |
| 2008 | Pine Ridge GC | (Canada) Wes Heffernan | 270 | |
Free Press Manitoba Classic
| 2007 | Pine Ridge GC | (Canada) Mike Mezei | 271 | |
MTS Classic
| 2006 | Pine Ridge GC | (United States) Josh Habig | 271 | |
| 2005 | Pine Ridge GC | (United States) Lee Williamson | 276 | |
| 2004 | Pine Ridge GC | (United States) Erik Compton | 267 | |
| 2003 | Pine Ridge GC | (Canada) Jon Mills | 275 | |
| 2002 | Pine Ridge GC | (Mexico) Alex Quiroz | 272 | |
| 2001 | Pine Ridge GC | (United States) Kenneth Staton | 266 | |
| 2000 | Pine Ridge GC | (Australia) Ben Ferguson | 267 | |
| 1999 | Elmhurst G&CC | (Australia) Neale Smith | 272 | |
| 1998 | Elmhurst G&CC | (United States) Perry Parker | 281 | |
Xerox Manitoba Open
| 1997 | Elmhurst G&CC | (United States) Mark Wurtz | 276 | |
| 1996 | Pine Ridge GC | (Canada) Rob McMillan (amateur) | 274 | |
| 1995 | Pine Ridge GC | (Namibia) Trevor Dodds | 279 | |
| 1994 | Pine Ridge GC | (United States) Scott Dunlap | 276 | |
| 1993 | Breezy Bend G&CC | (Canada) Frank Edmonds | 270 | |
| 1992 | Breezy Bend G&CC | (United States) Chris Patton | 265 | |
Manitoba Open
| 1991 | Breezy Bend G&CC | (United States) Kelly Gibson | 267 | |
| 1990 | Southwood G&CC | (United States) Jeff Bloom | 264 | |
| 1989 | Southwood G&CC | (United States) Stu Hendley | 265 | |
| 1988 | Southwood G&CC | (Canada) Dave Barr | 270 | |
| 1987 | Southwood G&CC | (Canada) Dave Barr | 266 | |
| 1986 | Southwood G&CC | (Canada) Bob Panasik | 204 (Note: Panasik won on the second hole of a sudden-death playoff.) | |
| 1985 | Southwood G&CC; Elmhurst GC | (Canada) Robbie Phillips | 137 (Note: Heavy rain rendered the Southwood G&CC course unplayable, which led to the cancellation of the second round and the tournament being reduced to 36-holes, with the final round played at Elmhurst GC.) | |
| 1984 | Niakwa CC | (Canada) Dan Halldorson | 208 | |
| 1983 | Rossmere G&CC | (Canada) Dan Halldorson | 208 | |
| 1982 | Elmhurst GC | (Canada) Kelly Murray | 218 (Note: Murray won on the second hole of a sudden-death playoff.) | |
| 1981 | Breezy Bend G&CC | (United States) Dan Croonquist | 207 | |
| 1980 | Pine Ridge GC | (Canada) Bob Cox | 210 | |
| 1979 | Glendale G&CC | (Canada) Jerry Anderson | 212 | |
| 1978 | Pine Ridge GC | (Canada) Dan Halldorson | 213 | |
| 1977 | Rossmere G&CC | (Canada) Dan Halldorson | 208 | |
| 1976 | Elmhurst GC | (United States) Rick Ehrmanntraut | 211 | |
| 1975 | Breezy Bend G&CC | (United States) Ed Byman | 208 | |
| 1974 | St. Charles CC | (Canada) Bill Tape | 211 (Note: Tape won following a playoff.) | |
| 1973 | Niakwa CC | (Canada) Gar Hamilton | 212 (Note: Hamilton won following a playoff.) | |
| 1972 | Glendale G&CC | (Canada) Wilf Homenuik | 211 | |
| 1971 | Rossmere G&CC | (United States) John Elliott, Jr. | 210 (Note: Elliott won following a playoff.) | |
| 1970 | Pine Ridge GC | (Canada) Gary Pitchford | 211 | |
| 1969 | Breezy Bend G&CC | (United States) Mike Reasor | 209 | |
| 1968 | Bel Acres G&CC | (Canada) Alvie Thompson | 213 | |
| 1967 | Elmhurst G&CC | (Canada) Moe Norman | 201 (Note: Norman won following a playoff.) | |
| 1966 | Glendale G&CC | (Canada) Moe Norman | 212 | |
| 1965 | Elmhurst G&CC | (Canada) Moe Norman | 208 | |
| 1964 | Pine Ridge GC | (Canada) Alvie Thompson | 212 | |
| 1963 | Southwood G&CC | (United States) Dayton Olson | 213 (Note: Olson won following a playoff.) | |
| 1962 | Pine Ridge GC | (Canada) Alvie Thompson | 217 | |
| 1961 | Pine Ridge GC | (Canada) Wilf Homenuik | 211 | |
| 1960 | St. Charles CC | (Canada) George Knudson | 210 | |
| 1959 | Elmhurst G&CC | (Canada) George Knudson | 211 | |
| 1958 | Niakwa CC | (Canada) George Knudson | 210 | |
| 1957 | Glendale G&CC | Joe Tachan | 213 | |
| 1956 | Southwood G&CC | Ev Stuart | 284 | |
| 1955 | Niakwa CC | (Canada) Harold Eidsvig | 221 (Note: Eidsvig won following a playoff.) | |
| 1954 | Glendale G&CC | Len Harvey | 220 | |
| 1953 | Niakwa CC | Len Harvey | 226 | |
| 1952 | Elmhurst G&CC | (Canada) Harold Eidsvig | 221 | |
| 1951 | Pine Ridge GC | Joe Tachan | 219 | |
| 1950 | St. Charles CC | (Canada) Bobby Reith | 218 | |
| 1949 | Southwood G&CC | (Canada) Harold Eidsvig | 142 | |
| 1948 | Assiniboine GC | (Canada) Allan Boes | 149 | |
| 1947 | Niakwa CC | (Canada) Harold Eidsvig | 147 | |
| 1946 | Pine Ridge GC | Joe Tachan | 70 | |
| 1945 | St. Charles CC | Claude Shackell | 75 | |
| 1944 | Southwood G&CC | (Canada) Allan Boes | 143 | |
| 1943 | Niakwa CC | (Canada) Allan Boes | 149 | |
| 1942 | Southwood G&CC | Gerhard Kennedy | 141 | |
| 1941 | Pine Ridge GC | (Canada) Allan Boes | 146 | |
| 1940 | Niakwa CC | Arthur Land | 149 | |
| 1939 | Southwood G&CC | Kas Zebowski | 141 | |
| 1938 | Elmhurst G&CC | Kas Zebowski | 138 | |
| 1937 | St. Charles CC | Arthur Land | 151 | |
| 1936 | Pine Ridge GC | Kas Zebowski | 142 | |
| 1935 | Niakwa CC | (Canada) Bobby Reith | 152 | |
| 1934 | Elmhurst GC | (Canada) Bobby Reith | 142 | |
| 1933 | St. Charles CC | Bud Donovan | 146 | |
| 1932 | Pine Ridge GC | (Canada) Bobby Reith | 148 | |
| 1931 | Niakwa CC | Eric Bannister | 144 | |
| 1926–30 | No tournament | | | |
| 1925 | Pine Ridge GC | Ernest Penfold | 298 | |
| 1924 | Winnipeg GC | Jack Cuthbert (amateur) | 303 | |
| 1923 | St. Charles CC | Willie Kidd | 150 (Note: Kidd won following an 18-hole playoff; Willie Kidd 72, Hugh Fletcher 77, James Pringle 78.) | |
| 1922 | St. Charles CC; Winnipeg GC; Elmhurst GC (Note: One round played at each course.) | Eric Bannister | 232 | |
| 1921 | No tournament | | | |
| 1920 | | Frank Adams | 231 | |
| 1919 | St. Charles CC | (Canada) Karl Keffer | 307 | |
