= Saskatchewan Open =

Tournament information
- Location: Saskatchewan, Canada
- Established: 1919
- Tour: PGA Tour Americas
- Format: Stroke play

Current champion
- (Canada) A. J. Ewart

The Saskatchewan Open is a golf tournament on PGA Tour Canada that is held in Saskatchewan, Canada.

Founded in 1919, the Saskatchewan Open was held annually until 1981, only missing from the calendar in 1924 when the Western Canada tournament was held in Saskatchewan and for four years during the Second World War. Following the withdrawal of major sponsors, Molson Brewery, it was not held in 1982. Still lacking sponsors, it returned in 1983 and 1984 but as a relatively minor event before entering an extended hiatus. Having not been played from 1985 to 2007, it was revived in 2008. From 2010 to 2016 the tournament had several changes of title, all reflecting its host venue and sponsor, the Dakota Dunes Casino.

== Winners ==
Year	Venue	Winner	Score	Ref
Elk Ridge Saskatchewan Open
2024	Elk Ridge Resort	(Canada) A. J. Ewart	263	
2023	Elk Ridge Resort	(United States) John Pak	259	
Elk Ridge Open
2022	Elk Ridge Resort	Canceled		
2021	Elk Ridge Resort	(Canada) Raoul Ménard	201	
2017–2020	No tournament			
SIGA Dakota Dunes Open
2016	Dakota Dunes GL	(Germany) Max Rottluff	265	
2015	Dakota Dunes GL	(United States) Michael Letzig	272 (Note: Letzig won following a playoff.)	
2014	Dakota Dunes GL	(United States) Matt Harmon	264	
Dakota Dunes Open
2013	Dakota Dunes GL	(United States) Wil Collins	267	
Dakota Dunes Casino Open
2012	Dakota Dunes GL	(Canada) Matt Hill	269 (Note: Hill won following a playoff.)	
2011	Dakota Dunes GL	(United States) Joe Panzeri	273	
2010	Dakota Dunes GL	(United States) Will Wilcox	263	
Saskatchewan Open
2009	Dakota Dunes GL	(United States) Andres Gonzales	274	
2008	Dakota Dunes GL	(New Zealand) Josh Geary	270	
1985–2007	No tournament			
1984	Saskatoon G&CC	(Canada) Brian French (amateur)	143	
1983	Saskatoon G&CC	(Canada) Darrell McDonald	213	
1982	No tournament			
Molson Saskatchewan Open
1981	Wascana CC	(Canada) Cec Ferguson	204	
1980	Saskatoon G&CC	(Canada) Jerry Anderson	207 (Note: Anderson won with a birdie on the first hole of a sudden-death playoff.)	
1979	Wascana CC	(Canada) Jerry Anderson	208	
1978	Riverside CC	(Canada) Roger Klatt	211	
Saskatchewan Open
1977	Wascana CC	(Canada) Dan Halldorson	207 (Note: Halldorson won following a playoff.)	
1976	Holiday Park CC	(Canada) Dan Talbot	204	
1975	Murray Municipal GC	(Canada) Greg Pidlaski	211	
1974	Saskatoon G&CC	(Canada) Bob Panasik	203	
1973	Wascana CC	(Canada) Leo Bradshaw	209	
1972	Riverside CC	(New Zealand) Terry Kendall	206	
1971	Regina GC	(United States) Tom McGinnis	142 (Note: McGinnis won following a playoff.)	
1970		(Canada) Brian Bamford	138	
1969		(Canada) Bobby Cox	208	
1968		(Canada) Moe Norman	208 (Note: Norman won following a playoff.)	
1967		(Canada) Len Harvey	218	
1966		(Canada) Frank Fowler	205	
1965		(Canada) Stan Homenuik	207	
1964		(Canada) Dave Berg	214	
1963		(Canada) Moe Norman	210	
1962		(Canada) Bob Wylie	209	
1961		(Canada) Jimmy Doyle	212	
1960		(Canada) Buddy Loftus	209	
1959		(Canada) Len Collett	217	
1958		(Canada) Douglas Silverberg	215	
1957		(Canada) Henry Martell	208	
1956		(Canada) Henry Martell	218	
1955		(Canada) Stan Leonard	132	
1954		(Canada) Gordon Beattle	154	
1953		(Canada) Henry Martell	206	
1952		(Canada) Henry Martell	208	
1951		(Canada) Pat Fletcher	209	
1950		(Canada) Stan Leonard	212	
1949	Willowdale GC	(Canada) Tom Ross	183	
1948	Prince Albert GC	(Canada) Pat Fletcher	139	
1947	Saskatoon G&CC	(Canada) Pat Fletcher	140	
1946	Regina GC	(Canada) Wilf Greenwood	143	
1942–45	No tournament due to restrictions during World War II			
1941	Saskatoon G&CC	(Canada) Wilf Greenwood	148	
1940	Moose Jaw GC	(Canada) Wilf Greenwood	146	
1939	Regina GC	(Canada) Kas Zabowski	140	
1938	Waskesiu GC	(Canada) Tom Ross	148	
1937	Riverside CC	(Canada) Wilf Greenwood	144 (Note: Greenwood won following a playoff.)	
1936	Prince Albert GC	(Canada) Wilf Greenwood	143 (Note: Greenwood won following a playoff.)	
1935	Moose Jaw GC	(Canada) Hugh Fletcher	149	
1934	Regina GC	(Canada) Tom Ross	152	
1933	Saskatoon G&CC	(Canada) George Bigelow	150	
1932	Regina GC	(Canada) Joe Land	148	
1931	Riverside CC	(Canada) Jack Cuthbert	151	
1930	Moose Jaw GC	(Canada) Hal Clarke	146	
1929	Wascana CC	(Canada) Eric Bannister	149	
1928	Saskatoon GC	(Canada) Tom Ross	141	
1927	Moose Jaw GC	(Canada) Freddie Fletcher	141	
1926	Regina GC; Wascana CC	(Canada) Joe Land	146	
1925	Moose Jaw GC	(Canada) Willie Kidd	156	
1924	Not held due to hosting of Western Canada tournament			
1923	Wascana CC	(Canada) Duncan Sutherland	148	
1922	Moose Jaw GC	(Canada) Duncan Sutherland	156	
1921	Saskatoon GC	(Canada) Jackson Walton	152	
1920	Regina GC	(Canada) George Ayton	143	
1919		(Canada) Alex Weir	161	
