= 2010 WGC-CA Championship =

Coordinates: 25.815°N 80.340°W

Tournament information
- Dates: March 11–14, 2010
- Location: Doral, Florida, U.S.
- Course: Doral Golf Resort & Spa
- Tours: PGA Tour; European Tour

Statistics
- Par: 72
- Length: 7,334 yards (6,706 m)
- Field: 68 players
- Cut: None
- Prize fund: $8,500,000 €6,207,143
- Winner's share: $1,400,000 €1,022,353

Champion
- (South Africa) Ernie Els
- 270 (−18)

Location in the United States

The 2010 WGC-CA Championship was a golf tournament held March 11–14 at Doral Golf Resort & Spa in Doral, Florida, a suburb west of Miami. It was the eleventh WGC-CA Championship tournament, and the second of four World Golf Championships events staged in 2010.

The only players eligible to compete who did not enter were six-time champion Tiger Woods (on an indefinite break from golf) and Ryo Ishikawa (graduating from high school).

Ernie Els, the 2004 champion, won his second WGC title with a bogey-free 66 (−6) in the final round, four strokes ahead of runner-up Charl Schwartzel, the 54-hole co-leader with Els.

== Field ==
The field consisted of players from the top of the Official World Golf Ranking and the money lists/Order of Merit from the six main professional golf tours. 68 of the 70 qualifying players competed. Each player is classified according to the first category in which he qualified, but other categories are shown in parentheses.

1. The top 50 players from the Official World Golf Ranking, as of March 1, 2010
Robert Allenby (2), Ángel Cabrera (2,3), Paul Casey (2,5,6), Stewart Cink (2,3), Tim Clark (2), Luke Donald (2,3), Ernie Els (2,3,5), Ross Fisher (2,5), Jim Furyk (2,3), Sergio García (2,5,6), Lucas Glover (2,3), Retief Goosen (2,3), Anders Hansen (2,9), Søren Hansen (2), Pádraig Harrington (2,3,5), Yuta Ikeda (2,7), Thongchai Jaidee (2,5,6,10), Miguel Ángel Jiménez (2,6), Dustin Johnson (2,3,4), Zach Johnson (2,3), Robert Karlsson (2,6), Martin Kaymer (2,5,6), Anthony Kim (2), Søren Kjeldsen (2,5), Matt Kuchar (2), Hunter Mahan (2,3,4), Graeme McDowell (2), Rory McIlroy (2,5), Phil Mickelson (2,3), Edoardo Molinari (2), Francesco Molinari (2,5), Sean O'Hair (2,3), Geoff Ogilvy (2,3,4,5), Kenny Perry (2,3), Ian Poulter (2,4,5,6), Álvaro Quirós (2,5), Charl Schwartzel (2,6,9), Adam Scott (2), Michael Sim (2,8), Vijay Singh (2), Henrik Stenson (2,5), Steve Stricker (2,3,4), Camilo Villegas (2,4,6), Nick Watney (2,3), Mike Weir (2,3), Lee Westwood (2,5,6), Oliver Wilson (2,5), Yang Yong-eun (2,3)

Ryo Ishikawa (2,7) and Tiger Woods (2,3) did not play.

2. The top 50 players from the Official World Golf Ranking, as of March 8, 2010

3. The top 30 players from the final 2009 FedExCup Points List
Jason Dufner, Brian Gay, Jerry Kelly, Marc Leishman, Steve Marino, Kevin Na, John Senden, Heath Slocum, David Toms, Scott Verplank

4. The top 10 players from the 2010 FedExCup Points List, as of March 8, 2010
Ben Crane, Bill Haas, J. B. Holmes, Ryan Palmer

5. The top 20 players from the final 2009 European Tour Order of Merit
Simon Dyson, Gonzalo Fernández-Castaño, Peter Hanson, Ross McGowan

6. The top 10 players from the European Tour Order of Merit, as of March 1, 2010

7. The top 2 players from the final 2009 Japan Golf Tour Order of Merit

8. The top 2 players from the final 2009 PGA Tour of Australasia Order of Merit
Alistair Presnell

9. The top 2 players from the final 2009 Sunshine Tour Order of Merit

10. The top 2 players from the final 2009 Asian Tour Order of Merit
Liang Wenchong

== Round summaries ==
=== First round ===
Thursday, March 11, 2010

| Place | Player | Score | To par |
|---|---|---|---|
| 1 | (South Africa) Charl Schwartzel | 67 | −5 |
| T2 | (Australia) Robert Allenby | 68 | −4 |
| T2 | (South Africa) Ernie Els | 68 | −4 |
| T2 | (Fiji) Vijay Singh | 68 | −4 |
| T5 | (England) Paul Casey | 69 | −3 |
| T5 | (Denmark) Søren Hansen | 69 | −3 |
| T5 | (United States) J. B. Holmes | 69 | −3 |
| T5 | (United States) Dustin Johnson | 69 | −3 |
| T5 | (Italy) Francesco Molinari | 69 | −3 |
| T5 | (Australia) John Senden | 69 | −3 |

=== Second round ===
Friday, March 12, 2010

| Place | Player | Score | To par |
|---|---|---|---|
| 1 | (South Africa) Ernie Els | 68-66=134 | −10 |
| 2 | (Australia) Robert Allenby | 68-67=135 | −9 |
| T3 | (United States) Bill Haas | 71-66=137 | −7 |
| T3 | (South Africa) Charl Schwartzel | 67-70=137 | −7 |
| T5 | (Denmark) Søren Hansen | 69-69=138 | −6 |
| T5 | (Republic of Ireland) Pádraig Harrington | 70-68=138 | −6 |
| T7 | (South Africa) Tim Clark | 70-69=139 | −5 |
| T7 | (Japan) Yuta Ikeda | 71-68=139 | −5 |
| T7 | (United States) J. B. Holmes | 69-70=139 | −5 |
| T7 | (Australia) John Senden | 69-70=139 | −5 |
| T7 | (Fiji) Vijay Singh | 68-71=139 | −5 |
| T7 | (Canada) Mike Weir | 73-66=139 | −5 |

=== Third round ===
Saturday, March 13, 2010

| Place | Player | Score | To par |
|---|---|---|---|
| T1 | (South Africa) Ernie Els | 68-66-70=204 | −12 |
| T1 | (South Africa) Charl Schwartzel | 67-70-67=204 | −12 |
| 3 | (Republic of Ireland) Pádraig Harrington | 70-68-67=205 | −11 |
| 4 | (Australia) Robert Allenby | 68-67-71=206 | −10 |
| 5 | (United States) Bill Haas | 71-66-70=207 | −9 |
| 6 | (Germany) Martin Kaymer | 70-72-66=208 | −8 |
| T7 | (England) Paul Casey | 69-72-68=209 | −7 |
| T7 | (Denmark) Søren Hansen | 69-69-71=209 | −7 |
| T7 | (United States) Matt Kuchar | 71-71-67=209 | −7 |
| T7 | (Fiji) Vijay Singh | 68-71-70=209 | −7 |

=== Final round ===
Sunday, March 14, 2010

| Place | Player | Score | To par | Money ($) |
|---|---|---|---|---|
| 1 | (South Africa) Ernie Els | 68-66-70-66=270 | −18 | 1,400,000 |
| 2 | (South Africa) Charl Schwartzel | 67-70-67-70=274 | −14 | 850,000 |
| T3 | (Republic of Ireland) Pádraig Harrington | 70-68-67-72=277 | −11 | 426,667 |
| T3 | (Germany) Martin Kaymer | 70-72-66-69=277 | −11 | 426,667 |
| T3 | (United States) Matt Kuchar | 71-71-67-68=277 | −11 | 426,667 |
| T6 | (England) Paul Casey | 69-72-68-69=278 | −10 | 214,300 |
| T6 | (United States) Bill Haas | 71-66-70-71=278 | −10 | 214,300 |
| T6 | (Northern Ireland) Graeme McDowell | 74-68-70-66=278 | −10 | 214,300 |
| T6 | (Australia) Alistair Presnell | 72-70-72-64=278 | −10 | 214,300 |
| T6 | (Spain) Álvaro Quirós | 72-69-69-68=278 | −10 | 214,300 |

==== Scorecard ====
Final round

| Hole | 1 | 2 | 3 | 4 | 5 | 6 | 7 | 8 | 9 | 10 | 11 | 12 | 13 | 14 | 15 | 16 | 17 | 18 |
|---|---|---|---|---|---|---|---|---|---|---|---|---|---|---|---|---|---|---|
| Par | 5 | 4 | 4 | 3 | 4 | 4 | 4 | 5 | 3 | 5 | 4 | 5 | 3 | 4 | 3 | 4 | 4 | 4 |
| (South Africa) Els | −13 | −13 | −14 | −15 | −15 | −15 | −15 | −16 | −16 | −16 | −16 | −17 | −17 | −17 | −17 | −17 | −18 | −18 |
| (South Africa) Schwartzel | −12 | −13 | −13 | −13 | −12 | −13 | −14 | −15 | −15 | −16 | −15 | −16 | −16 | −16 | −15 | −15 | −14 | −14 |
| (Republic of Ireland) Harrington | −11 | −11 | −11 | −11 | −12 | −12 | −12 | −12 | −12 | −13 | −13 | −13 | −12 | −11 | −10 | −11 | −11 | −11 |
| (Germany) Kaymer | −8 | −8 | −9 | −9 | −9 | −9 | −10 | −10 | −11 | −11 | −11 | −11 | −10 | −10 | −11 | −11 | −11 | −11 |
| (United States) Kuchar | −8 | −7 | −8 | −7 | −8 | −8 | −9 | −9 | −9 | −9 | −9 | −9 | −9 | −9 | −10 | −11 | −11 | −11 |

Cumulative tournament scores, relative to par

| Birdie | Bogey |
