= 1991–92 Southern Africa Tour =

Golf tour season

1991–92 Southern Africa Tour season
- Duration: 12 December 1991 – 29 February 1992
- Number of official events: 10
- Most wins: (South Africa) Ernie Els (4)
- Order of Merit: (South Africa) Ernie Els

The 1991–92 Southern Africa Tour was the 21st season of the Southern Africa Tour, the main professional golf tour in South Africa since it was formed in 1971.

== Season outline ==
A variety of golfers had success early in the season. De Wet Basson won the inaugural event of the year, the Fancourt Hall of Fame. The following event, the Goodyear Classic, was won by Justin Hobday, four shots ahead of American Hugh Royer III. Retief Goosen won the third event of the season, the Spoornet Classic, by a shot over John Bland and Richard Kaplan.

The remainder of the year was dominated by Ernie Els. Els won the Protea Assurance South African Open and the Lexington PGA Championship in consecutive weeks. He took the lead in the Order of Merit. Northern Ireland's David Feherty won the following event, the Bell's Cup, by one shot over Mark McNulty. Els retained his lead on the Order of Merit with his third-place finish. At the next week's event, the Trustbank Tournament of Champions, Els "made up four shots in the last nine holes" but still finished a shot behind champion Bobby Lincoln. Els came back and won the next event, the EVS South African Masters. At the final event of the season, the Hollard Royal Swazi Sun Classic, Els again made up much ground late, finishing eagle-birdie, turning a three-stroke deficit into a one stroke win. Els won the Order of Merit by a wide margin.

== Schedule ==
The following table lists official events during the 1991–92 season.

Date	Tournament	Location	Purse (R)	Winner (Note: The number in brackets after each winner's name is the number of Southern Africa Tour events they had won up to and including that tournament. This information is only shown for Southern Africa Tour members.)	OWGR points	Notes
15 Dec	Fancourt Hall of Fame	Cape	450,000	(South Africa) De Wet Basson (1)	8	New tournament
21 Dec	Goodyear Classic	Cape	300,000	(South Africa) Justin Hobday (1)	8	
11 Jan	Spoornet Classic	Cape	300,000	(South Africa) Retief Goosen (1)	12	New tournament
19 Jan	Protea Assurance South African Open	Transvaal	450,000	(South Africa) Ernie Els (1)	20	
25 Jan	Lexington PGA Championship	Transvaal	400,000	(South Africa) Ernie Els (2)	20	
1 Feb	Bell's Cup	Cape	350,000	(Northern Ireland) David Feherty (3)	18	
8 Feb	Trustbank Tournament of Champions	Transvaal	350,000	(South Africa) Bobby Lincoln (3)	14	
15 Feb	EVS South African Masters	Transvaal	350,000	(South Africa) Ernie Els (3)	14	
22 Feb	ICL International	Transvaal	300,000	(United States) Kevin Johnson (1)	18	
29 Feb	Hollard Royal Swazi Sun Classic	Swaziland	300,000	(South Africa) Ernie Els (4)	12	

=== Unofficial events ===
The following events were sanctioned by the Southern Africa Tour, but did not carry official money, nor were wins official.

Date	Tournament	Location	Purse (R)	Winner	OWGR points	Notes
8 Dec	Nedbank Million Dollar Challenge	Transvaal	US$2,500,000	(Germany) Bernhard Langer	46	Limited-field event

== Order of Merit ==
The Order of Merit was based on prize money won during the season, calculated in South African rand.

Position	Player	Prize money (R)
1	(South Africa) Ernie Els	324,017
2	(South Africa) De Wet Basson	155,425
3	(South Africa) Wayne Westner	147,416
4	(Zimbabwe) Tony Johnstone	109,124
5	(South Africa) Retief Goosen	108,488
