= Skin Game (disambiguation) =

Skin Game is a 1971 movie comedy starring James Garner and Louis Gossett, Jr.

Skin Game or The Skin Game may refer to:

- Skin Game (novel), a Dresden Files novel by Jim Butcher
- The Skin Game (play), a play by John Galsworthy
- The Skin Game (1921 film), a 1921 Dutch film, based on the play
- The Skin Game (1931 film), a 1931 film directed by Alfred Hitchcock, also based on the play
- Skin Game, a 2009 paranormal romantic suspense novel by Ann Aguirre
- "The Skin Game", a song by Gary Numan from Machine and Soul
- "The Skin Game" (Happy Days), a 1974 television episode

== See also ==
- Skin in the Game (disambiguation)
- Skins Game (disambiguation)
