= De Wet Basson =

South African professional golfer

Personal information
- Nationality: South Africa

Career
- Sport: Golf
- Status: Professional
- Former tours: European Tour; Sunshine Tour
- Professional wins: 1

Number of wins by tour
- Sunshine Tour: 1

Best results in major championships
- Masters Tournament: DNP
- PGA Championship: DNP
- U.S. Open: DNP
- The Open Championship: T39: 1992

De Wet Basson is a South African retired professional golfer. He won the 1991 Fancourt Hall of Fame tournament on the Sunshine Tour and represented South Africa at the 1992 World Cup. He played on the European Tour in 1993 and 1994 and was runner-up in the 1993 Turespaña Iberia Open de Canarias.

== Professional career ==
Basson played on the South African tour from late 1989. In December 1991 he won the Fancourt Hall of Fame tournament, two strokes ahead of Anders Forsbrand. Later in the 1991–92 season he was a runner-up in the ICL International, two strokes behind Kevin Johnson. Basson played in a few tournaments in Europe in 1992. He qualified for the 1992 Open Championship at Muirfield where he made the cut and finished tied for 39th place. In November he played with Ernie Els for South Africa in the 1992 World Cup in Madrid. Basson had a final round 66 to help lift South Africa into 8th place.

Basson played full time on the 1993 European Tour, playing 26 tournaments on the tour and finishing 33rd in the Order of Merit. In February he was runner-up in the Turespaña Open De Canaria, six strokes behind Mark James. He had four other top-10 finishes during the season. He was 108th in the world rankings at the end of October 1993. Basson played again on the European Tour in 1994 but had less success, with just one top-10 finish and ending the season 127th in the Order of Merit.

Basson continued to play on the South African tour until early 1996 and made a few later appearances between 1999 and 2001, but had no top-10 finishes in South Africa after 1992.

== Professional wins (1) ==
=== Southern Africa Tour wins (1) ===
No.	Date	Tournament	Winning score	Margin of victory	Runner-up
1	15 Dec 1991	Fancourt Hall of Fame	−12 (71-70-68-67=276)	2 strokes	(Sweden) Anders Forsbrand

== Results in major championships ==
Tournament	1992	1993
The Open Championship	T39	CUT

Note: Basson only played in The Open Championship.
CUT = missed the half-way cut
"T" indicates a tie for a place

== Team appearances ==
- World Cup (representing South Africa): 1992
