= 2004 WGC-American Express Championship =

Golf tournament

Tournament information
- Dates: 30 September – 3 October 2004
- Location: Thomastown, County Kilkenny, Ireland; 52.526°N 7.189°W
- Course: Mount Juliet Golf Course
- Tours: PGA Tour; European Tour

Statistics
- Par: 72
- Length: 7,256
- Field: 68 players
- Cut: None
- Prize fund: $7,000,000
- Winner's share: $1,200,000

Champion
- (South Africa) Ernie Els
- 270 (−18)
- Location in Ireland

The 2004 WGC-American Express Championship was a golf tournament that was contested from 30 September to 3 October 2004 at Mount Juliet Golf Course in Thomastown, County Kilkenny, Ireland. It was the fifth WGC-American Express Championship tournament and the third of three World Golf Championships events held in 2004.

Ernie Els won the tournament for his first of two WGC titles, which lifted him to second in the Official World Golf Ranking. Tiger Woods was the 2-time defending champion but finished in 9th place.

== Round summaries ==
=== First round ===
Place	Player	Score	To par
1	(United States) Todd Hamilton	66	−6
T2	(Australia) Stuart Appleby	67	−5
T2	(England) Luke Donald	67	−5
T2	(United States) Steve Flesch	67	−5
T2	(Spain) Miguel Ángel Jiménez	67	−5
T2	(Spain) Sergio García	67	−5
T2	(Australia) Adam Scott	67	−5
T8	(Australia) Robert Allenby	68	−4
T8	(Denmark) Thomas Bjørn	68	−4
T8	(South Africa) Retief Goosen	68	−4
T8	(United States) Zach Johnson	68	−4
T8	(United States) Justin Leonard	68	−4
T8	(Australia) Nick O'Hern	68	−4
T8	(England) Lee Westwood	68	−4
T8	(United States) Tiger Woods	68	−4

=== Second round ===
Place	Player	Score	To par
1	(South Africa) Ernie Els	69-64=133	−11
T2	(United States) Todd Hamilton	66-69=135	−9
T2	(Spain) Miguel Ángel Jiménez	67-68=135	−9
4	(United States) Justin Leonard	68-68=136	−8
T5	(Denmark) Thomas Bjørn	68-69=137	−7
T5	(United States) Steve Flesch	67-70=137	−7
T5	(South Africa) Retief Goosen	68-69=137	−7
T5	(England) Lee Westwood	68-69=137	−7
T9	(Argentina) Ángel Cabrera	69-69=138	−6
T9	(England) Luke Donald	67-71=138	−6
T9	(United States) Brad Faxon	70-68=138	−6
T9	(Republic of Ireland) Pádraig Harrington	69-69=138	−6
T9	(England) David Howell	69-69=138	−6
T9	(United States) Tiger Woods	68-70=138	−6

=== Third round ===
Place	Player	Score	To par
1	(South Africa) Ernie Els	69-64-68=201	−15
2	(Denmark) Thomas Bjørn	68-69-66=203	−13
T3	(United States) Todd Hamilton	66-69-69=204	−12
T3	(Republic of Ireland) Pádraig Harrington	69-69-66=204	−12
T3	(England) David Howell	69-69-66=204	−12
6	(South Africa) Retief Goosen	68-69-68=205	−11
7	(Spain) Sergio García	67-72-67=206	−10
T8	(Northern Ireland) Darren Clarke	71-72-65=208	−8
T8	(United States) Zach Johnson	68-71-69=208	−8
T8	(England) Lee Westwood	68-69-71=208	−8
T8	(United States) Tiger Woods	68-70-70=208	−8

== Final leaderboard ==
Place	Player	Score	To par	Winnings ($)
1	(South Africa) Ernie Els	69-64-68-69=270	−18	1,200,000
2	(Denmark) Thomas Bjørn	68-69-66-68=271	−17	675,000
3	(England) David Howell	69-69-66-71=275	−13	450,000
T4	(Northern Ireland) Darren Clarke	71-72-65-68=276	−12	308,000
T4	(Spain) Sergio García	67-72-67-70=276	−12	308,000
T6	(South Africa) Retief Goosen	68-69-68-72=277	−11	200,000
T6	(United States) Todd Hamilton	66-69-69-73=277	−11	200,000
T6	(Republic of Ireland) Pádraig Harrington	69-69-66-73=277	−11	200,000
9	(United States) Tiger Woods	68-70-70-70=278	−10	155,000
10	(United States) Zach Johnson	68-71-69-71=279	−9	135,000
