= People vs. The Pros =

People vs. The Pros is a golf tournament played annually since 2003 at courses all over the United States. The event has two different division, ages 18–49 and ages 50+. The event takes two professionals and two amateurs who qualify for the event during a qualifying tournament. The winning amateur from each age division then would play an 18-hole match against a PGA Tour pro, using the correct handicap system. Courses that have hosted the event are Pinehurst, Lake Las Vegas Resort, Barton Creek and in Los Cabos.

Professionals who have competed in People vs. The Pros are John Daly, Lee Trevino, Chris DiMarco, Tom Watson, Retief Goosen, Justin Leonard, Ben Crenshaw and Gary McCord.

The 2009 event featured Nick Faldo and Fred Couples.

== Results ==
- 2003 John Daly won his match, Lee Trevino lost his match
- 2004 John Daly and Gary McCord both lost their matches
- 2005 Justin Leonard and Ben Crenshaw both won their matches
- 2006 Retief Goosen and Gary McCord both won their matches
- 2007 Not Contested
- 2008 Chris DiMarco and Tom Watson both won their matches
- 2009 Postponed to 2010
