= Samantha Els =

South African rugby union player

- Full name: Samantha Leigh Els
- Born: 26 May 1999 (age 27) United Kingdom
- Height: 181 cm (5 ft 11 in)
- Weight: 87 kg (192 lb; 13 st 10 lb)

Rugby union career
- Position: Lock
Senior career
| Years | Team | Apps | (Points) |
- New York Rugby Club
International career
| Years | Team | Apps | (Points) |
| 2022 | United States | | |
| 2023 | South Africa | 2 | (0) |
- Correct as of 22 June 2025

Samantha Leigh Els (born 26 May 1999) is a South African rugby union player. In 2023, she made her debut for the South Africa women's national rugby union team. She is the daughter of South African golfer Ernie Els.

== Early life ==
From Herolds Bay in the southern Cape, Els graduated in Human Biology from Stanford University. In 2013, she acted as her father Ernie Els' caddy at the Masters Tournament Par 3 Contest at Augusta National Golf Club. She also accompanied him as he captained the International Team in the 2019 Presidents Cup at Royal Melbourne Golf Club in Australia.

== Career ==
Although her father was not keen on her playing rugby initially, Els plays as a lock forward.

She plays club rugby for New York Rugby Club. In 2022, she played international rugby for the USA in 2022. In August 2023, she was invited to a training camp for the South Africa women's national rugby union team for the first time. The following month, 19 September 2023, she made her debut for South Africa.

== Personal life ==
Els is one of two children to parents Ernie and wife Liezl. Her brother, Ben was diagnosed with autism as a child. Subsequently, the family set up the Els for Autism Foundation. For her autism advocacy, she was awarded the Autism Science Foundation's (ASF) Caryn Schwartzman Spirit Award in 2022.
