= Skins Game =

The Skins Game may refer to:

== Golf ==
=== United States ===
- Skins Game (PGA Tour)
- LPGA Skins Game
- Wendy's Champions Skins Game

=== Other countries ===
- Riffa Views Skins Game, Bahrain
- Telus World Skins Game, Canada

== Curling ==
- TSN All-Star Curling Skins Game, a curling event in Canada

== See also ==
- Skins game, a type of scoring in various sports
- Major Title, a video game released as The Irem Skins Game in North America
