= Skin in the Game =

Skin in the game is a phrase used by investors.

Skin in the Game may refer to:

== Books ==
- Skin in the Game (book), a 2018 book by Nassim Nicholas Taleb
- Skin in the Game, a 2026 novel by Ed Lynskey

== Music ==
- Skin in the Game (EP), by Helix, 2011
- "Skin in the Game", a song by Ava Max from Don't Click Play, 2025

== Television ==
- "Skin in the Game" (CSI: Crime Scene Investigation), a 2013 episode
- "Skin in the Game" (The Good Doctor), a 2024 episode
- "Skin in the Game" (Suits), a 2017 episode

== See also ==
- Skin Game (disambiguation)
- Skins game, a type of scoring for various sports
