= Johnnie Walker Super Tour =

Tournament information
- Location: Southeast Asia
- Established: 1996
- Format: Stroke play
- Prize fund: $350,000
- Month played: November/December
- Final year: 1998

Tournament record score
- Aggregate: 269 Vijay Singh (1998)
- To par: −19 Vijay Singh (1998)

Final champion
- (Fiji) Vijay Singh

The Johnnie Walker Super Tour was a golf tournament that was held in Southeast Asia in 1996, 1997 and 1998, during the European Tour off-season. It was an eight-man, six-day, four-round, 72-hole stroke play event with each round being played in a different country. The field consisted of four of the world's leading golfers plus one player from each of the host countries.

The tournament was sponsored by Johnnie Walker and had a prize fund of $350,000 each year. The winners were four-time major champion Ernie Els, Jesper Parnevik and three-time major champion Vijay Singh.

== Event summaries ==
=== 1996 ===
The first tournament was played for a first prize of $100,000. The star players were Ernie Els, Colin Montgomerie, Vijay Singh and Ian Woosnam, and they were joined by Lin Keng-chi, Park Nam-sin, Felix Casas and Chawalit Plaphol from the host countries of Taiwan, South Korea, the Philippines and Thailand respectively. The tournament was played over six days, with one round at each of Ta Shee Golf and Country Club in Taipei, Seoul Country Club in Seoul, Orchard Golf and Country Club in Manila, and Thana City Golf and Country Club in Bangkok.

Els held at least a share of the lead after each round, firstly alongside Lin and Park after Taipei, then with Woosnam after South Korea. After the Philippines he was in sole possession of the lead, but Woosnam came back in Bangkok to leave them tied after 72-holes. On the first hole of the sudden-death playoff, Els made a par to secure the victory.

=== 1997 ===
The second edition was contested by Els, Woosnam, Nick Faldo, Jesper Parnevik, Maian Nasim, Boonchu Ruangkit, Casas and Hong Chia-yuh. Indonesia, Thailand, the Philippines and Taiwan were the hosts. Faldo and Parnevik were tied for the lead after both the first and second rounds, before Parnevik pulled ahead in Boracay and held on in Taiwan to finish four strokes clear of Faldo in second place.

=== 1998 ===
Nine golfers contested the third tournament, again with a $100,000 first prize, with Parnevik, Els, Singh, Brian Watts, Marimuthu Ramayah, Prayad Marksaeng, Chang Tse-peng and Casas being joined by star of the women's game Laura Davies; Filipino, Casas was invited as there was no representative from China. After the six day tour in Malaysia, Thailand, Taiwan and China, Singh emerged as the winner, two strokes ahead of Els with Davies finishing adrift in last place.

== Winners ==
Year	Winner	Score	To par	Margin of victory	Runner-up	Locations	Ref.
1998	(Fiji) Vijay Singh	269	−19	2 strokes	(South Africa) Ernie Els	Malaysia, Thailand, Taiwan and China	
1997	(Sweden) Jesper Parnevik	276	−12	4 strokes	(England) Nick Faldo	Indonesia, Thailand, the Philippines and Taiwan	
1996	(South Africa) Ernie Els	274	−14	Playoff	(Wales) Ian Woosnam	Taiwan, South Korea, the Philippines and Thailand	
