= Riffa Views Skins Game =

The Riffa Views Skins Game was a skins game, that was contested only once in 2008, by some of the world's top golfers. It was sponsored by Riffa Views Estates in Bahrain.

The event in 2008 was played over The Montgomerie course at Riffa Views Signature Estates. The Montgomerie was designed by Colin Montgomerie, who also competed in the event alongside Camilo Villegas, Michael Campbell, and Retief Goosen. Goosen was the overall skins and money winner after winning the final $50,000 skin in a shootout on the 18th hole.

== Results ==
=== 2008 ===
Played over The Montgomerie course at Riffa Views Signature Estates, Bahrain.

Player	Skins	Money ($)
(South Africa) Retief Goosen	9	151,000
(Scotland) Colin Montgomerie	6	80,000
(Colombia) Camilo Villegas	2	17,000
(New Zealand) Michael Campbell	1	4,000
