= Spoornet Classic =

South African golf tournament, 1990–1993

The Spoornet Classic was a golf tournament in South Africa that was played on the Sunshine Tour. Winners include Retief Goosen, who would go on to win two U.S. Opens, and Ernie Els, who went on the win two U.S. Opens and two Open Championships.

In 1992, it had one of the richest purses on the Tour at that time, offering R 47,130 to the winner.

== Winners ==
Year	Winner
1993	(South Africa) Justin Hobday
1992	(South Africa) Retief Goosen
1991	(South Africa) Kevin Stone
1990	(South Africa) Ernie Els
