= Ernie Els =

South African professional golfer (born 1969)

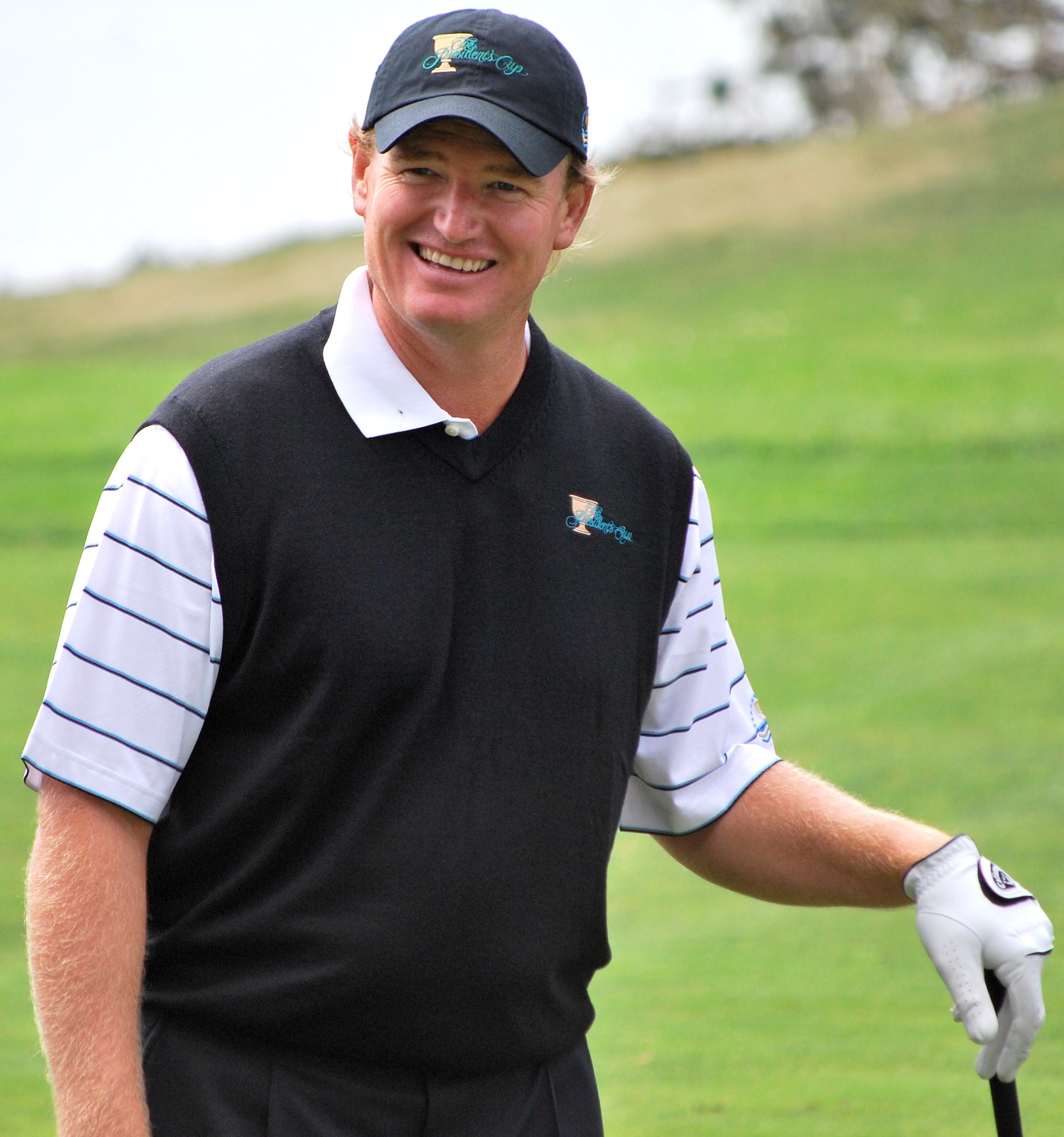
- Els in 2009

Personal information
- Full name: Theodore Ernest Els
- Nickname: The Big Easy
- Nationality: South Africa
- Born: 17 October 1969 (age 57) Johannesburg, South Africa
- Height: 6 ft 3 in (191 cm)
- Weight: 210 lb (95 kg; 15 st)
- Spouse: Liezl (m. 1998)
- Children: 2

Career
- Sport: Golf
- Turned professional: 1989
- Current tours: PGA Tour Champions; European Senior Tour
- Former tours: PGA Tour; European Tour; Sunshine Tour
- Professional wins: 79
- Highest ranking: 1 (22 June 1997) (9 weeks)

Number of wins by tour
- PGA Tour: 19
- European Tour: 28 (7th all-time)
- Japan Golf Tour: 1
- Asian Tour: 3
- Sunshine Tour: 16
- PGA Tour of Australasia: 5
- PGA Tour Champions: 7
- Other: 21

Best results in major championships (wins: 4)
- Masters Tournament: 2nd: 2000, 2004
- PGA Championship: 3rd/T3: 1995, 2007
- U.S. Open: Won: 1994, 1997
- The Open Championship: Won: 2002, 2012

Achievements and awards
- World Golf Hall of Fame: 2011 (member page)
- Southern Africa Tour Order of Merit winner: 1991–92, 1994–95
- European Tour Golfer of the Year: 1994, 2002, 2003
- PGA Tour Rookie of the Year: 1994
- European Tour Order of Merit winner: 2003, 2004
- Payne Stewart Award: 2015
- Old Tom Morris Award: 2018

Theodore Ernest Els (/ˈɛls/; born 17 October 1969) is a South African professional golfer. A former World No. 1, he is nicknamed "The Big Easy" due to his physical stature along with his fluid golf swing. Among his more than 70 career victories are four major championships: the U.S. Open in 1994 at Oakmont and in 1997 at Congressional, and The Open Championship in 2002 at Muirfield and in 2012 at Royal Lytham & St Annes. He is one of six golfers to twice win both the U.S. Open and The Open Championship.

Other highlights in Els's career include topping the 2003 and 2004 European Tour Order of Merit (money list), and winning the World Match Play Championship a record seven times. He was the leading career money winner on the European Tour until overtaken by Lee Westwood in 2011, and was the first member of the tour to earn over €25,000,000 from European Tour events. He has held the number one spot in the Official World Golf Ranking and until 2013 held the record for weeks ranked in the top ten with 788. Els rose to fifteenth in the world rankings after winning the 2012 Open Championship. He was elected to the World Golf Hall of Fame in 2010, on his first time on the ballot, and was inducted in May 2011.

Els now primarily plays on the PGA Tour Champions.

== Early life and amateur career ==
Growing up in Lambton, Germiston, South Africa, Els played rugby, cricket, tennis and, starting at age 8, golf. He was a skilled junior tennis player and won the Eastern Transvaal Junior Championships at age 13. Els first learned the game of golf from his father Neels, a trucking executive, at the Germiston Golf course, He was soon playing better than his father (and his older brother, Dirk), and by the age of 14 he was a scratch handicap. It was around this time that he decided to focus exclusively on golf.

Els first achieved prominence in 1984, when he won the Junior World Golf Championship in the Boys 13–14 category. Phil Mickelson was second to Els that year. Els won the South African Amateur a few months after his 17th birthday, becoming the youngest-ever winner of that event, breaking the record which had been held since 1935 by Bobby Locke. Els contested the 1987 British Amateur Championship, qualifying from stroke play for the 64-player match play segment, but was knocked out there.

Els received interest to play college golf at several American universities, but chose to stay in South Africa and fulfill his mandatory military service in the South African Army starting in January 1988.

In 1989, Els won the South African Amateur Stroke Play Championship.

== Professional career ==
=== 1989–1996: early years and first major win ===
In 1989, Els turned professional. In 1991, he began playing on the Southern Africa Tour. In 1992, he won the Protea Assurance South African Open, his first professional win. He won the tour's Order of Merit during the 1991/92 and 1994/95 seasons. In 1993, Els won his first tournament outside of South Africa at the Dunlop Phoenix in Japan. In 1994, Els won his first major championship at the U.S. Open. Els was tied with Colin Montgomerie and Loren Roberts after 72 holes and they went to an 18-hole playoff the next day. In spite of starting the playoff bogey-triple bogey, Els was able to match Roberts' score of 74. Els parred the second hole of sudden death to win his first U.S. Open title.

Els brought his game all around the world in his young career winning the Dubai Desert Classic on the European Tour, and the Toyota World Match Play Championship defeating once again Colin Montgomerie 4 & 2. The following year, Els defended his World Match Play Championship, defeating Steve Elkington 3 & 1. Els won the GTE Byron Nelson Classic in the United States then headed back home to South Africa and won twice more. In 1996, Els won his third straight World Match Play Championship at Wentworth, defeating Vijay Singh in the final 3 & 2. No player in history had ever managed to win three successive titles in the one-on-one tournament. Els finished the year with a win at his home tournament at the South African Open.

=== 1997–2002: career years and multi-major championships ===
1997 was a career year for Els first winning his second U.S. Open (once again over Colin Montgomerie) this time at Congressional Country Club, making him the first foreign player since Alex Smith (1906, 1910) to win the U.S. Open twice. He defended his Buick Classic title and added the Johnnie Walker Classic to his list of victories. Els nearly won the World Match Play Championship for a fourth consecutive year, but lost to Vijay Singh in the final. 1998 and 1999 continued to be successful years for Els with 4 wins on both the PGA and European tours.

2000 started with Els being given a special honour by the board of directors of the European Tour awarding him with honorary life membership of the European Tour because of his two U.S. Opens and three World Match Play titles. 2000 was the year of runners-up for Els; with three runner-up finishes in the Majors (Masters, U.S. Open and The Open Championship) and seven second-place finishes in tournaments worldwide. In 2001 Els failed to win a US PGA tour event for the first time since 1994 although he ended the year with nine second-place finishes.

2002 was arguably Els's best year, which started with a win at the Heineken Classic at the Royal Melbourne Golf Club. Then went to America and outplayed World Number one Tiger Woods to lift the Genuity Championship title. The premier moment of the season was surely his Open Championship triumph in very tough conditions at Muirfield. Els overcame a four-man playoff to take home the famous Claret Jug trophy for the first time, also quieting his critics about his mental toughness. The South African also won his fourth World Match Play title, along with his third Nedbank Challenge in the last four years, dominating a world-class field and winning by 8 shots.

=== 2003–2005: the Big Five ===
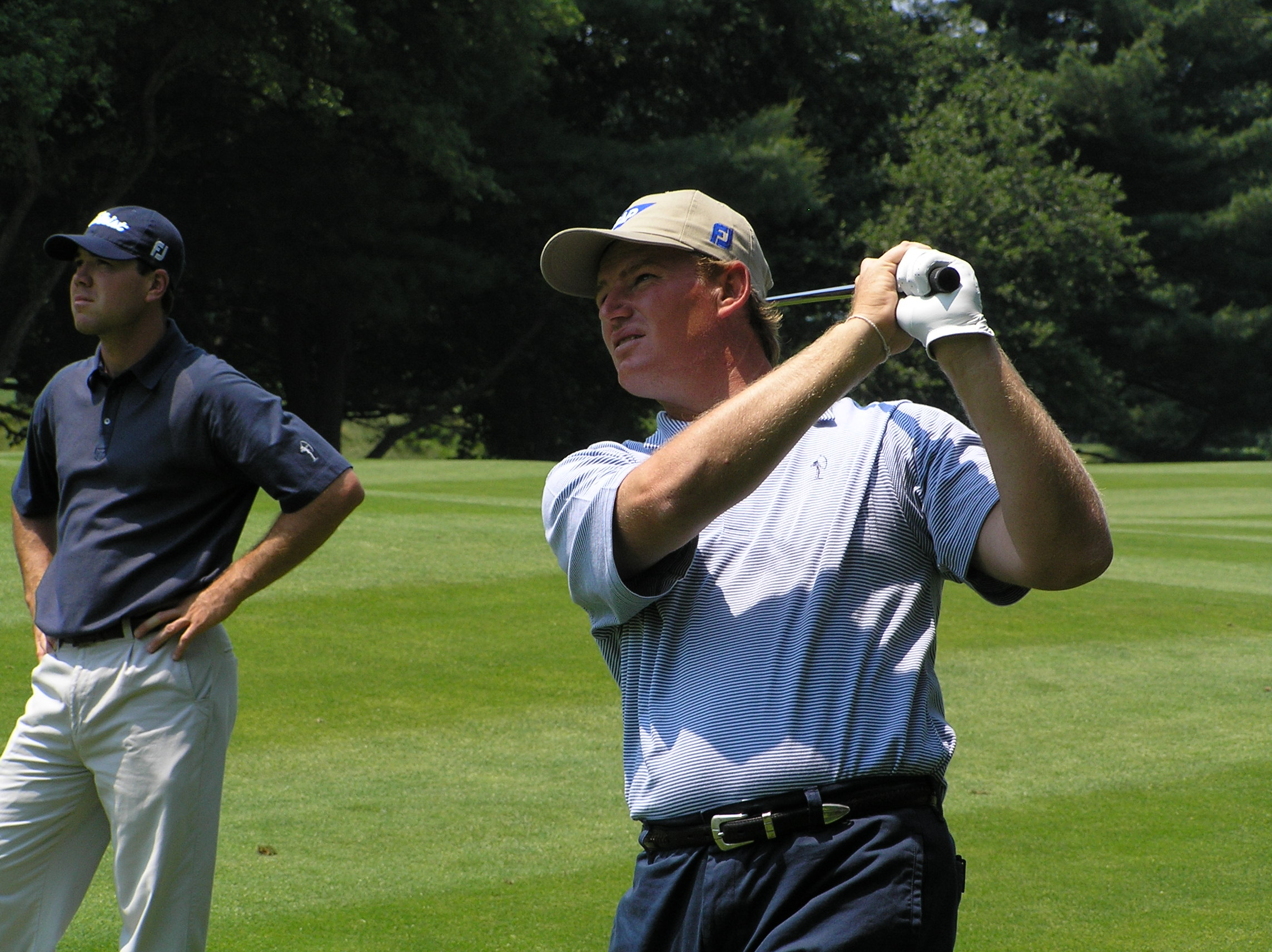
Els at Westchester in 2004

2003 gave Els his first European Tour Order of Merit. Although playing fewer events than his competitors Els won four times and had three runners-up. He also performed well in the United States with back to back victories at the Mercedes Championship – where he set the all-time PGA Tour 72-hole record for most strokes under par at 31 under – and Sony Open and achieved top-20 spots in all four majors, including a fifth-place finish at the U.S. Open and sixth-place finishes at both the Masters and PGA Championship. To top off the season Els won the World Match Play title for a record-tying fifth time. In 2003 he was voted 37th on the SABC3's Great South Africans.

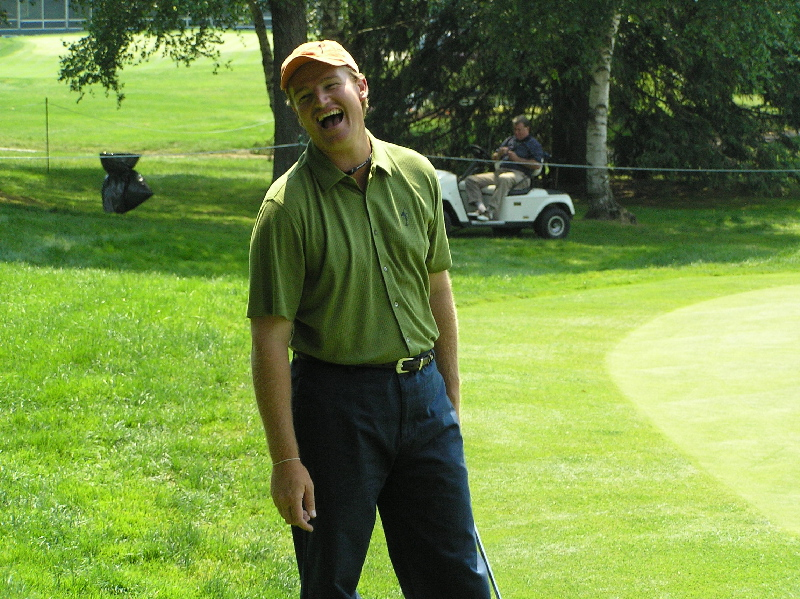
Els shares a laugh during the practice round for the 2004 Buick Classic

2004 was another successful year as Els won 6 times on both tours, including big wins at Memorial, WGC-American Express Championship and his sixth World Match Play Championship, a new record. His success did not stop there. Els showed remarkable consistency in the Majors but lost to Phil Mickelson in the Masters when Mickelson birdied the 18th for the title, finished ninth in the U.S. Open after playing in the final group with friend and fellow countryman Retief Goosen and surprisingly lost in a playoff in the Open to the then-unknown Todd Hamilton. Els had a 14-foot (4.3 m) putt for birdie on the final hole of regulation for the Open at Royal Troon, but he missed the putt and lost in the playoff. Els ended the major season with a fourth-place finish in the PGA Championship, where a three-putt on the 72nd hole would cost him a place in the playoff. In total, Els had 16 top-10 finishes, a second European Order of Merit title in succession and a second-place finish on the United States money list.

2004 was the start of the "Big Five era", the era in golf in which Tiger Woods, Vijay Singh, Ernie Els, Retief Goosen and Phil Mickelson dominated the game. The five switched up and down the top five positions in the World Golf Ranking; most notably Vijay Singh's derailment of Tiger Woods as the best golfer in the world. The five stayed, for the most part, in the top five spots from 2004 until the start of 2007. Nine majors were won between them, many fighting against each other head to head. Els has finished runner-up in six majors, finishing runner-up to Tiger Woods more than any other golfer.

In July 2005, Els injured his left knee while sailing with his family in the Mediterranean. Despite missing several months of the 2005 season due to the injury, Els won the second event on his return, the Dunhill Championship. With his victory at the 2005 Qatar Masters, an event co-sanctioned by the Asian Tour, Els became the second golfer after Lee Westwood to win on all six of the big tours on the International Federation of PGA Tours.

=== 2006–2011: gradual recovery and comeback ===
At the start of the 2007 season, Ernie Els laid out a three-year battle plan to challenge Tiger Woods as world number one. "I see 2007 as the start of a three-year plan where I totally re-dedicate myself to the game", Els told his official website. When he missed the cut by two strokes at the 2007 Masters Tournament, Els ended tour-leading consecutive cut streaks on both the PGA Tour and the European Tour. On the PGA Tour, his streak began at the 2004 The Players Championship (46 events) and on the European Tour it began at the 2000 Johnnie Walker Classic (82 events)

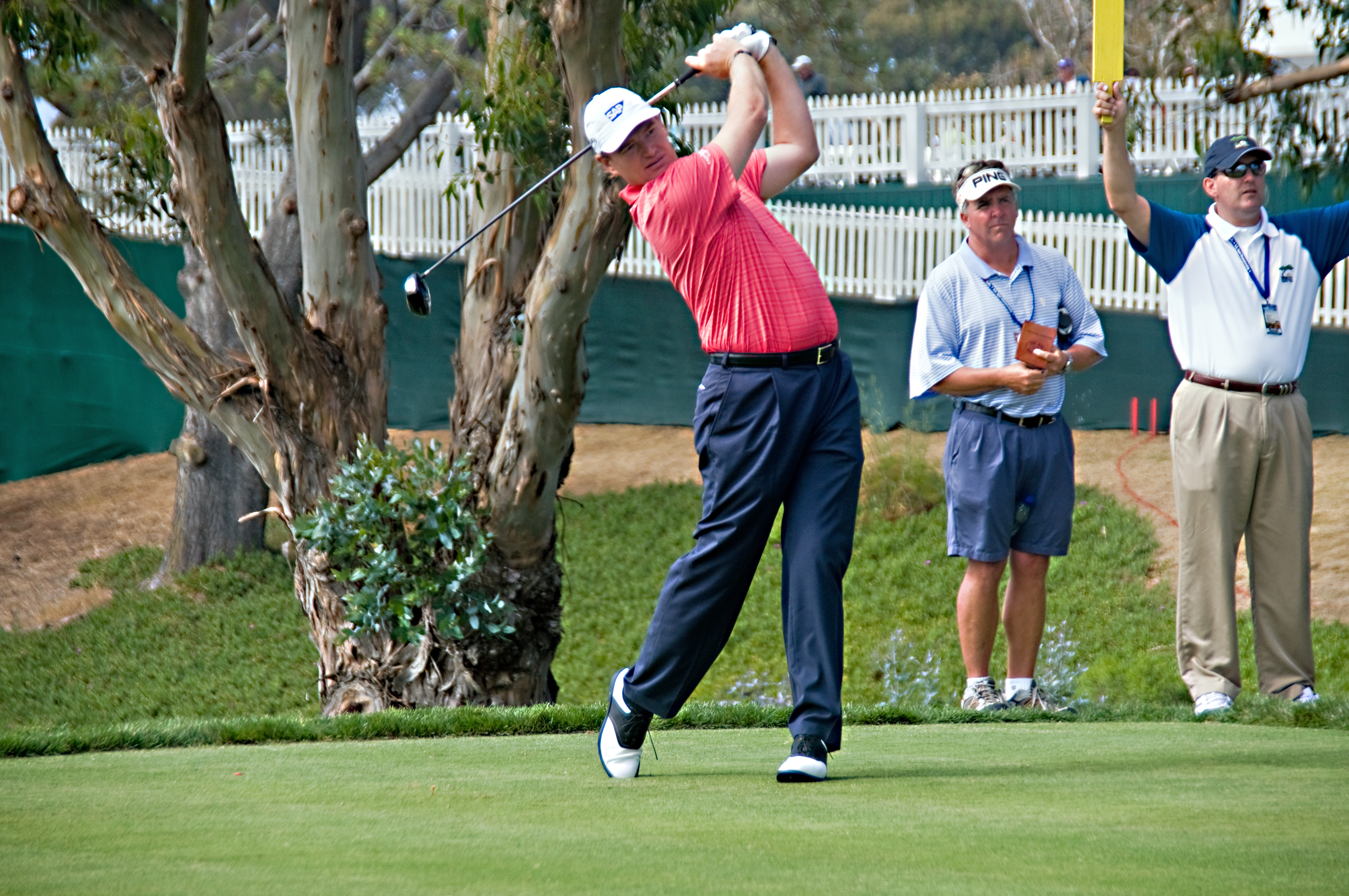
Els at Torrey Pines for the 2008 U.S. Open

On 2 March 2008, Els won the Honda Classic contested at PGA National's Championship Course in Palm Beach Gardens, Florida. Els shot a final round 67 in tough windy conditions, which was enough to give him the win by one stroke over Luke Donald. The win marked the end of a three and a half-year-long stretch without a win on the PGA Tour for Els. The win was also his 16th victory on the PGA Tour.

On 8 April 2008, Els officially announced that he was switching swing coaches from David Leadbetter (whom Els had worked with since 1990) to swing coach Butch Harmon.

Els finally did break his winless streak by capturing the WGC-CA Championship at Doral in 2010, winning by four strokes over fellow countryman Charl Schwartzel. It was Els's second WGC tournament title. The victory also saw Els overtake Colin Montgomerie to become the career money leader on the European Tour. Els then won the Arnold Palmer Invitational at Bay Hill two weeks later. It was his 18th PGA Tour victory, and his second in as many starts. The win at Bay Hill also vaulted Els to the top of the FedEx Cup standings. He held the top spot for 22 consecutive weeks.

In June, Els almost captured his third U.S. Open title at Pebble Beach. Els briefly held a share of the lead after birding the sixth hole, but was derailed by a stretch of bogey, double bogey, bogey on 9,10, and 11. Els finished the tournament in solo 3rd.

Els capped his year by winning the PGA Grand Slam of Golf in October, with a one stroke victory over David Toms, and also capturing the South African Open title by beating Retief Goosen by one shot.

After his successful 2010 season, Els struggled to find his form in 2011. He ultimately dropped out of the top 50 in the Official World Golf Ranking for the first time since 1993.

=== 2012–2019: fourth major championship and career volatility ===
Els started the 2012 season in his home country at the Volvo Golf Champions where he finished in a tie for second place after he and Retief Goosen lost out in a playoff to Branden Grace. Els was next in contention at the Transitions Championship, where he needed a win to qualify for the 2012 Masters. Els led the tournament for most of the final round and had the lead outright until the 16th hole. However, he finished the tournament bogey-bogey missing a short three-footer on the last hole to make a playoff. The tournament was eventually won by Luke Donald. In April, Els failed to qualify for the Masters for the first time since 1993. He was ranked 58th in the world prior to the tournament (the top 50 are given automatic invitations). Ultimately, Els's unsuccessful bids to qualify for the Masters was viewed as the likely end of his competitiveness on the PGA Tour.

Els surprised the golfing world by winning the 2012 Open Championship in July by birding the 72nd hole. Adam Scott led by four shots after a birdie at the 14th hole, but bogeyed the final four holes to miss a playoff with Els by one stroke. Els's win rejuvenated his career and earned him 5-year exemptions to the other 3 majors. Els became the eighth player to win major tournaments in three different decades, joining his countryman Gary Player, Jack Nicklaus, Lee Trevino, Billy Casper, Raymond Floyd, John Henry Taylor, and Harry Vardon (Tiger Woods and Phil Mickelson have since become the ninth and tenth, respectively). Els's win also marked the third major champion out of the previous four major championships to be won with a type of long putter. His win reignited the controversy over the legality of long or anchored putters in golf.

In June 2013, Els won for the first time since the 2012 Open Championship at the BMW International Open in Munich, Germany. He claimed a wire-to-wire victory with a one-stroke win over Thomas Bjørn for his 28th European Tour title. Els moved up to 14th from 20th in the world rankings after the win.

Els struggled to find his form throughout the 2014 season. He finished 4th at the WGC-Accenture Match Play Championship in February, 5th at The Barclays and 7th at the PGA Championship, but struggled with missed cuts, including a missed cut at the Masters in April. Els's struggles continued into 2015 when he made only 10 cuts on the PGA Tour. He finished a 173rd in the FedEx Cup and failed to qualify for the playoffs. In preparation for the anchored putter ban in 2016, Els switched back to the short putter in late 2015. Els's struggles with short putts, or the "yips", became the draw of much media attention in early 2016. At the 2016 Masters Tournament, Els's putting was again the source of negative publicity when he six-putted from 3 feet on his opening hole. Els recorded a 9 on the hole and ended up shooting 80–73 and missing the cut. After the Masters, Els thanked his fans on his website for their support and said he was embarrassed by his putting performance.

=== 2020–2025: PGA Tour Champions ===
In January 2020, Els joined the PGA Tour Champions shortly after his 50th birthday. In January 2020, Els shot 72-65-65 to tie for the lead of his first PGA Tour Champions event, the Mitsubishi Electric Championship at Hualalai. Miguel Ángel Jiménez and Fred Couples also qualified for the playoff. Jiménez won the event with a birdie on the second playoff hole.

In March 2020, Els won the Hoag Classic in Newport Beach, California. Els finished with a 4-under-par 67 to finish 54 holes in 16-under-par 197, two strokes ahead of Fred Couples, Robert Karlsson, and Glen Day. This was just Els's third start on the PGA Tour Champions.

In October 2020, Els won the SAS Championship in Cary, North Carolina. Els shot a 6-under-par 66 in the final round to win by one stroke over Colin Montgomerie.

In March 2023, Els carded a final round 65 to win the Hoag Classic at Newport Beach, California, by a single stroke.

Els won three times on the PGA Tour Champions in 2024: the Principal Charity Classic and American Family Insurance Championship in June and the Kaulig Companies Championship, his first major title, in July.

Els won his seventh PGA Tour Champions event at the season-opening 2025 Mitsubishi Electric Championship at Hualalai.

== Personal life ==
Els married his wife Liezl in 1998 in Cape Town, and they have two children. In 2008, after Els started to display an "Autism Speaks" logo on his golf bag it was announced that their then five-year-old son was autistic. Their main residence is at the Wentworth Estate near Wentworth Golf Club in the south of England. However, they also split time between South Africa and their family home in the US, in order to get better treatment for his son.

Samantha made her debut for the Springbok Women, South Africa women's national rugby union team, against the San Clemente Rhinos, 19 September 2023. When not playing, Els has a golf course design business, a charitable foundation that supports golf among underprivileged youth in South Africa and a winemaking business.

In May 2025, Els was part of President Cyril Ramaphosa's entourage that went to meet U.S President Donald Trump over allegations of Afrikaner genocide and persecution in South Africa.

=== Els-designed golf courses ===
- Anahita Golf Course – Beau Champ, Mauritius
- Mission Hills Golf Club (The Savannah Course) – Shenzhen, China
- Whiskey Creek – Ijamsville, Maryland, USA
- Oubaai – Garden Route, South Africa
- The Els Club – Dubai, UAE
- The Els Club Teluk Datai – Langkawi, Malaysia
- The Els Club Desaru Coast – Desaru, Malaysia
- The Els Club Copperleaf Golf and Country Estate – Gauteng, South Africa
- The Els Club Vilamoura – Vilamoura, Algarve, Portugal
- Highlands Gate Golf Course – Dullstroom, Mpumalanga Province, South Africa

Els was also responsible for the refinement and modernisation of the West Course, Wentworth-Virginia Water, England, which took place in 2006.

Courses under construction include:

- Bridgesong - Blanchard, Oklahoma
- Hoakalei Country Club at Hoakalei Resort – ʻEwa Beach, Hawaii
- Albany – New Providence, The Bahamas
- Ecopark – Hanoi, Vietnam
- Durrat Al Bahrain Golf Course – Durrat Al Bahrain, Bahrain

=== Internationalization of golf ===
Unlike many of his contemporaries, Els is known for his willingness to participate in tournaments across the world, having played regularly in European Tour-sanctioned events in Asia, Australasia and his native country of South Africa. He has said that his globe-trotting schedule is in recognition of the global nature of golf. This caused some friction with the PGA Tour, an organisation that requested Els to play more tournaments in the United States. In late 2004, Tim Finchem, the director of the PGA Tour, wrote quite a firm letter to Els asking him to do so but Els publicized and rejected this request.

=== Foundation ===
The Ernie Els and Fancourt Foundation was established in 1999. It has the objective of identifying youths from under-privileged backgrounds who show talent and potential in the game of golf. It provides educational assistance amongst other moral and financial help in order for these youths to reach their full potential.

The first Friendship Cup was played in 2006 which is a match play competition, played in a Ryder Cup type format. In the cup, Els's foundation plays against the foundation of Tiger Woods. Els's foundation won 12.5 points to 3.5 points.

Els has also participated several times in the Gary Player Invitational series of charity golf events, to assist Player in raising significant funds for underprivileged children around the world.

=== Autism-related activities ===
Since his son's autism diagnosis, Els and his wife have been active in charities devoted to that condition. This involvement has increased as Ben has reached school age. In 2009, Els launched an annual charity golf event, the Els for Autism Pro-Am, held at the PGA National Resort & Spa in Palm Beach Gardens near his South Florida residence during the PGA Tour's March swing into the area. The first event, which featured many PGA Tour and Champions Tour golfers, raised $725,000 for The Renaissance Learning Center, a nonprofit charter school in the area for autistic children. The couple has also established the Els Center of Excellence, which began as a drive to build a new campus for the aforementioned school in Jupiter, Florida, but has since expanded into a $30 million plan to combine the school with a research facility.

=== ASM Scholarships ===
Ernie Els co-founded an athletic scholarship agency called (ASM Scholarships), in October 2018. The company is a college recruiting service that works with athletes worldwide from various sports and helps them secure athletic scholarships to American universities within the NCAA, NAIA and NJCAA. The company is owned by the ASM Sports Group, which has built a pathway for athletes from high school to college then professional sports or a career in a sporting job. In 2020 the company helped over 1000 athletes secure sport scholarships on average of $35,000 per year for student athletes, a total of $35,000,000. The company HQ is based in West Palm Beach Florida.

== Quotes ==
On his technique:

I've never been a very technical player. I don't get caught up in swing positions and mechanics. When I work on my swing...I'm looking for feels. You'll get better results—and often more distance—if you swing at eighty percent effort. I get all kinds of people telling me I have the best swing in the world—it's beautiful, it's effortless. But I know when that isn't true.

—Els on his son's autism:

It's been a bit of a challenge ... It's so new to everybody, that a lot of people have different ideas. After seeing just about everybody in the world, I decided on this path we're going to go. Like any family will tell you, it's not easy. And it's a change of life, a change of priorities. You've got to be ready for it. And it's happening more often. I never knew about it, never thought about it, until it's in your lap.

== Amateur wins ==
- 1984 World Junior Golf Championships (Boys 13–14 division)
- 1986 South African Boys Championship, South African Amateur
- 1989 South African Amateur Stroke Play Championship

== Professional wins (79) ==
=== PGA Tour wins (19) ===
Legend
Major championships (4)
World Golf Championships (2)
Other PGA Tour (13)

No.	Date	Tournament	Winning score	Margin of victory	Runner(s)-up
1	20 Jun 1994	U.S. Open	−5 (69-71-66-73=279)	Playoff	(Scotland) Colin Montgomerie, (United States) Loren Roberts
2	14 May 1995	GTE Byron Nelson Golf Classic	−17 (69-61-65-68=263)	3 strokes	(United States) Robin Freeman, (United States) Mike Heinen, (United States) D. A. Weibring
3	9 Jun 1996	Buick Classic	−13 (65-66-69-71=271)	8 strokes	(Australia) Steve Elkington, (United States) Tom Lehman, (United States) Jeff Maggert, (Australia) Craig Parry
4	15 Jun 1997	U.S. Open (2)	−4 (71-67-69-69=276)	1 stroke	(Scotland) Colin Montgomerie
5	22 Jun 1997	Buick Classic (2)	−16 (64-68-67-69=268)	2 strokes	(United States) Jeff Maggert
6	22 Mar 1998	Bay Hill Invitational	−14 (67-69-65-73=274)	4 strokes	(United States) Bob Estes, (United States) Jeff Maggert
7	21 Feb 1999	Nissan Open	−14 (68-66-68-68=270)	2 strokes	(United States) Davis Love III, (United States) Ted Tryba, (United States) Tiger Woods
8	6 Aug 2000	The International	48 pts (15-19-6-8=48)	4 points	(United States) Phil Mickelson
9	3 Mar 2002	Genuity Championship	−17 (66-67-66-72=271)	2 strokes	(United States) Tiger Woods
10	21 Jul 2002	The Open Championship	−6 (70-66-72-70=278)	Playoff	(Australia) Stuart Appleby, (Australia) Steve Elkington, (France) Thomas Levet
11	12 Jan 2003	Mercedes Championships	−31 (64-65-65-67=261)	8 strokes	(South Korea) K. J. Choi, (United States) Rocco Mediate
12	19 Jan 2003	Sony Open in Hawaii	−16 (66-65-66-67=264)	Playoff	(Australia) Aaron Baddeley
13	18 Jan 2004	Sony Open in Hawaii (2)	−18 (67-64-66-65=262)	Playoff	(United States) Harrison Frazar
14	6 Jun 2004	Memorial Tournament	−18 (68-70-66-66=270)	4 strokes	(United States) Fred Couples
15	3 Oct 2004	WGC-American Express Championship	−18 (69-64-68-69=270)	1 stroke	(Denmark) Thomas Bjørn
16	2 Mar 2008	The Honda Classic	−6 (67-70-70-67=274)	1 stroke	(England) Luke Donald
17	14 Mar 2010	WGC-CA Championship (2)	−18 (68-66-70-66=270)	4 strokes	(South Africa) Charl Schwartzel
18	29 Mar 2010	Arnold Palmer Invitational (2)	−11 (68-69-69-71=277)	2 strokes	(Italy) Edoardo Molinari, (United States) Kevin Na
19	22 Jul 2012	The Open Championship (2)	−7 (67-70-68-68=273)	1 stroke	(Australia) Adam Scott

PGA Tour playoff record (4–4)

No.	Year	Tournament	Opponent(s)	Result
1	1994	U.S. Open	(Scotland) Colin Montgomerie, (United States) Loren Roberts	Won with par on second extra hole after 18-hole playoff; Els: +3 (74), Roberts: +3 (74), Montgomerie: +7 (78)
2	2000	Mercedes Championships	(United States) Tiger Woods	Lost to birdie on second extra hole
3	2001	The Tour Championship	(Spain) Sergio García, (United States) David Toms, (Canada) Mike Weir	Weir won with birdie on first extra hole
4	2002	The Open Championship	(Australia) Stuart Appleby, (Australia) Steve Elkington, (France) Thomas Levet	Won with par on first extra hole after four-hole aggregate playoff; Els: E (4-3-5-4=16), Levet: E (4-2-5-5=16), Appleby: +1 (4-3-5-5=17), Elkington: +1 (5-3-4-5=17)
5	2003	Sony Open in Hawaii	(Australia) Aaron Baddeley	Won with birdie on second extra hole
6	2004	Sony Open in Hawaii	(United States) Harrison Frazar	Won with birdie on third extra hole
7	2004	The Open Championship	(United States) Todd Hamilton	Lost four-hole aggregate playoff; Hamilton: E (4-4-3-4=15), Els: +1 (4-4-4-4=16)
8	2012	Zurich Classic of New Orleans	(United States) Jason Dufner	Lost to birdie on second extra hole

=== European Tour wins (28) ===
Legend
Major championships (4)
World Golf Championships (2)
Other European Tour (22)

No.	Date	Tournament	Winning score	Margin of victory	Runner(s)-up
1	30 Jan 1994	Dubai Desert Classic	−20 (61-69-67-71=268)	6 strokes	(Australia) Greg Norman
2	20 Jun 1994	U.S. Open	−5 (69-71-66-73=279)	Playoff	(Scotland) Colin Montgomerie, (United States) Loren Roberts
3	19 Feb 1995	Lexington South African PGA Championship^{1}	−9 (65-71-71-64=271)	2 strokes	(South Africa) Roger Wessels
4	26 Jan 1997	Johnnie Walker Classic^{2}	−10 (70-68-71-69=278)	1 stroke	(Australia) Peter Lonard, (New Zealand) Michael Long
5	15 Jun 1997	U.S. Open (2)	−4 (71-67-69-69=276)	1 stroke	(Scotland) Colin Montgomerie
6	8 Feb 1998	South African Open^{1}	−15 (64-72-68-69=273)	3 strokes	(South Africa) David Frost
7	17 Jan 1999	Alfred Dunhill South African PGA Championship^{1} (2)	−15 (67-69-69-68=273)	4 strokes	(South Africa) Richard Kaplan
8	15 Jul 2000	Standard Life Loch Lomond	−11 (69-67-68-69=273)	1 stroke	(United States) Tom Lehman
9	3 Feb 2002	Heineken Classic^{2}	−17 (64-69-69-69=271)	5 strokes	(Australia) Peter Fowler, (England) David Howell, (Australia) Peter O'Malley
10	10 Mar 2002	Dubai Desert Classic (2)	−16 (68-68-67-69=272)	4 strokes	(Sweden) Niclas Fasth
11	21 Jul 2002	The Open Championship	−6 (70-66-72-70=278)	Playoff	(Australia) Stuart Appleby, (Australia) Steve Elkington, (France) Thomas Levet
12	2 Feb 2003	Heineken Classic^{2} (2)	−15 (70-72-66-65=273)	1 stroke	(England) Nick Faldo, (Australia) Peter Lonard
13	16 Feb 2003	Johnnie Walker Classic^{2,3} (2)	−29 (64-65-64-66=259)	10 strokes	(Australia) Stephen Leaney, (Australia) Andre Stolz
14	13 Jul 2003	Barclays Scottish Open (2)	−17 (64-67-67-69=267)	5 strokes	(Northern Ireland) Darren Clarke, (Wales) Phillip Price
15	7 Sep 2003	Omega European Masters	−17 (65-69-68-65=267)	6 strokes	(New Zealand) Michael Campbell
16	8 Feb 2004	Heineken Classic^{2} (3)	−20 (60-66-68-74=268)	1 stroke	(Australia) Adam Scott
17	3 Oct 2004	WGC-American Express Championship	−18 (69-64-68-69=270)	1 stroke	(Denmark) Thomas Bjørn
18	17 Oct 2004	HSBC World Match Play Championship	2 and 1		(England) Lee Westwood
19	6 Mar 2005	Dubai Desert Classic (3)	−19 (66-68-67-68=269)	1 stroke	(Wales) Stephen Dodd, (Spain) Miguel Ángel Jiménez
20	13 Mar 2005	Qatar Masters^{3}	−12 (73-69-69-65=276)	1 stroke	(Sweden) Henrik Stenson
21	1 May 2005	BMW Asian Open^{3}	−26 (67-62-68-65=262)	13 strokes	(England) Simon Wakefield
22	11 Dec 2005 (2006 season)	Dunhill Championship^{1}	−14 (71-67-68-68=274)	3 strokes	(South Africa) Louis Oosthuizen, (South Africa) Charl Schwartzel
23	17 Dec 2006 (2007 season)	South African Airways Open^{1} (2)	−24 (67-66-66-65=264)	3 strokes	(South Africa) Trevor Immelman
24	14 Oct 2007	HSBC World Match Play Championship (2)	6 and 4		(Argentina) Ángel Cabrera
25	14 Mar 2010	WGC-CA Championship (2)	−18 (68-66-70-66=270)	4 strokes	(South Africa) Charl Schwartzel
26	19 Dec 2010 (2011 season)	South African Open Championship^{1} (3)	−25 (65-65-67-66=263)	1 stroke	(South Africa) Retief Goosen
27	22 Jul 2012	The Open Championship (2)	−7 (67-70-68-68=273)	1 stroke	(Australia) Adam Scott
28	23 Jun 2013	BMW International Open	−18 (63-69-69-69=270)	1 stroke	(Denmark) Thomas Bjørn

^{1}Co-sanctioned by the Sunshine Tour
^{2}Co-sanctioned by the PGA Tour of Australasia
^{3}Co-sanctioned by the Asian Tour

European Tour playoff record (2–5)

No.	Year	Tournament	Opponent(s)	Result
1	1994	U.S. Open	(Scotland) Colin Montgomerie, (United States) Loren Roberts	Won with par on second extra hole after 18-hole playoff; Els: +3 (74), Roberts: +3 (74), Montgomerie: +7 (78)
2	1994	Mercedes German Masters	(Spain) Seve Ballesteros, (Spain) José María Olazábal	Ballesteros won with birdie on first extra hole
3	1998	Johnnie Walker Classic	(United States) Tiger Woods	Lost to birdie on second extra hole
4	2002	The Open Championship	(Australia) Stuart Appleby, (Australia) Steve Elkington, (France) Thomas Levet	Won with par on first extra hole after four-hole aggregate playoff; Els: E (4-3-5-4=16), Levet: E (4-2-5-5=16), Appleby: +1 (4-3-5-5=17), Elkington: +1 (5-3-4-5=17)
5	2004	The Open Championship	(United States) Todd Hamilton	Lost four-hole aggregate playoff; Hamilton: E (4-4-3-4=15), Els: +1 (4-4-4-4=16)
6	2006	Dubai Desert Classic	(United States) Tiger Woods	Lost to par on first extra hole
7	2012	Volvo Golf Champions	(South Africa) Retief Goosen, (South Africa) Branden Grace	Grace won with birdie on first extra hole

=== PGA of Japan Tour wins (1) ===
No.	Date	Tournament	Winning score	Margin of victory	Runners-up
1	21 Nov 1993	Dunlop Phoenix Tournament	−17 (68-69-65-69=271)	4 strokes	(United States) Fred Couples, (England) Barry Lane, (Japan) Tsuneyuki Nakajima, (Japan) Masashi Ozaki, (Fiji) Vijay Singh

=== Asian Tour wins (3) ===
No.	Date	Tournament	Winning score	Margin of victory	Runner(s)-up
1	16 Feb 2003	Johnnie Walker Classic^{1,2}	−29 (64-65-64-66=259)	10 strokes	(Australia) Stephen Leaney, (Australia) Andre Stolz
2	13 Mar 2005	Qatar Masters^{1}	−12 (73-69-69-65=276)	1 stroke	(Sweden) Henrik Stenson
3	1 May 2005	BMW Asian Open^{1}	−26 (67-62-68-65=262)	13 strokes	(England) Simon Wakefield

^{1}Co-sanctioned by the European Tour
^{2}Co-sanctioned by the PGA Tour of Australasia

Asian Tour playoff record (0–1)

No.	Year	Tournament	Opponent	Result
1	2006	Barclays Singapore Open	(Australia) Adam Scott	Lost three-hole aggregate playoff; Scott: −1 (4-3-4=11), Els: +1 (4-3-6=13)

=== Sunshine Tour wins (15) ===
Legend
Flagship events (2)
Other Sunshine Tour (13)

No.	Date	Tournament	Winning score	Margin of victory	Runner(s)-up
1	19 Jan 1992	Protea Assurance South African Open	−15 (65-69-69-70=273)	3 strokes	(South Africa) Derek James
2	25 Jan 1992	Lexington PGA Championship	−9 (69-66-65-71=271)	1 stroke	(South Africa) Ian Palmer, (South Africa) Kevin Stone, (South Africa) Wayne Westner
3	15 Feb 1992	EVS South African Masters	−13 (67-70-71-67=275)	1 stroke	(South Africa) Chris Williams
4	29 Feb 1992	Hollard Royal Swazi Sun Classic	−19 (74-67-64-64=269)	1 stroke	(England) Chris Davison
5	22 Nov 1992	FNB Players Championship	−18 (68-68-65-69=270)	4 strokes	(Zimbabwe) Mark McNulty
6	20 Dec 1992	Goodyear Classic	−12 (71-69-69-67=276)	2 strokes	(South Africa) Retief Goosen
7	8 Jan 1995	Bell's Cup	−13 (69-67-69-70=275)	5 strokes	(South Africa) Hendrik Buhrmann, (United States) P. H. Horgan III
8	19 Feb 1995	Lexington South African PGA Championship^{1} (2)	−9 (65-71-71-64=271)	2 strokes	(South Africa) Roger Wessels
9	21 Jan 1996	Philips South African Open (2)	−13 (65-70-74-66=275)	1 stroke	(South Africa) Brenden Pappas
10	8 Feb 1998	South African Open^{1} (3)	−15 (64-72-68-69=273)	3 strokes	(South Africa) David Frost
11	17 Jan 1999	Alfred Dunhill South African PGA Championship^{1} (3)	−15 67-69-69-68=273)	4 strokes	(South Africa) Richard Kaplan
12	9 Dec 2001	Vodacom Players Championship (2)	−15 (70-68-70-65=273)	1 stroke	(South Africa) Retief Goosen, (South Africa) Trevor Immelman, (Scotland) Alan McLean, (South Africa) Martin Maritz
13	11 Dec 2005	Dunhill Championship^{1}	−14 (71-67-68-68=274)	3 strokes	(South Africa) Louis Oosthuizen, (South Africa) Charl Schwartzel
14	17 Dec 2006	South African Airways Open^{1} (4)	−24 (67-66-66-65=264)	3 strokes	(South Africa) Trevor Immelman
15	19 Dec 2010	South African Open Championship^{1} (5)	−25 (65-65-67-66=263)	1 stroke	(South Africa) Retief Goosen

^{1}Co-sanctioned by the European Tour

Sunshine Tour playoff record (0–1)

No.	Year	Tournament	Opponent	Result
1	1993	Hollard Royal Swazi Sun Classic	(South Africa) Sean Pappas	Lost to par on first extra hole

=== Other wins (21) ===
Legend
World Golf Championships (1)
Other wins (20)

No.	Date	Tournament	Winning score	Margin of victory	Runner(s)-up
1	Apr 1990	Spoornet SA Classic			
2	Jun 1990	Highveld Classic		Playoff	(South Africa) Steve Burnett
3	23 Jun 1991	Amatola Sun Classic	−4 (70-72-67=209)		(South Africa) Peter van der Riet
4	16 Oct 1994	Toyota World Match Play Championship	4 and 2		(Scotland) Colin Montgomerie
5	6 Nov 1994	Sarazen World Open	−15 (67-73-68-65=273)	3 strokes	(United States) Fred Funk
6	18 Dec 1994	Johnnie Walker World Golf Championship	−16 (64-64-71-69=268)	6 strokes	(England) Nick Faldo, (United States) Mark McCumber
7	15 Oct 1995	Toyota World Match Play Championship (2)	3 and 1		(Australia) Steve Elkington
8	20 Oct 1996	Toyota World Match Play Championship (3)	3 and 2		(Fiji) Vijay Singh
9	10 Nov 1996	Johnnie Walker Super Tour	−14 (67-71-71-65=274)	Playoff	(Wales) Ian Woosnam
10	24 Nov 1996	World Cup of Golf (with (South Africa) Wayne Westner)	−29 (136-144-130-137=547)	18 strokes	United States − Steve Jones and Tom Lehman
11	24 Nov 1996	World Cup of Golf Individual Trophy	−16 (68-72-65-67=272)	3 strokes	(South Africa) Wayne Westner
12	18 Nov 1997	MasterCard PGA Grand Slam of Golf	−11 (68-65=133)	3 strokes	(United States) Tiger Woods
13	5 Dec 1999	Nedbank Million Dollar Challenge	−25 (67-66-64-66=263)	5 strokes	(Scotland) Colin Montgomerie
14	3 Dec 2000	Nedbank Golf Challenge (2)	−20 (66-67-67-68=268)	Playoff	(England) Lee Westwood
15	18 Nov 2001	WGC-World Cup (2) (with (South Africa) Retief Goosen)	−24 (64-71-63-66=264)	Playoff	Denmark − Thomas Bjørn and Søren Hansen, New Zealand − Michael Campbell and David Smail, United States − David Duval and Tiger Woods
16	20 Oct 2002	Cisco World Match Play Championship (4)	2 and 1		(Spain) Sergio García
17	1 Dec 2002	Nedbank Golf Challenge (3)	−21 (70-65-69-63=267)	8 strokes	(Scotland) Colin Montgomerie
18	19 Oct 2003	HSBC World Match Play Championship (5)	4 and 3		(Denmark) Thomas Bjørn
19	28 Nov 2004	Nelson Mandela Invitational (with (South Africa) Vincent Tshabalala)	−14 (64-66=130)	1 stroke	(South Africa) Simon Hobday and (England) Lee Westwood
20	9 Nov 2008	Hassan II Golf Trophy	−17 (69-67-71-68=275)	2 strokes	(England) Simon Dyson
21	20 Oct 2010	PGA Grand Slam of Golf (2)	−5 (68-69=137)	1 stroke	(United States) David Toms

Other playoff record (4–2)

No.	Year	Tournament	Opponent(s)	Result
1	1990	Highveld Classic	(South Africa) Steve Burnett	
2	1996	Johnnie Walker Super Tour	(Wales) Ian Woosnam	Won with par on first extra hole
3	1996	Nedbank Million Dollar Challenge	(Scotland) Colin Montgomerie	Lost to birdie on third extra hole
4	2000	Nedbank Golf Challenge	(England) Lee Westwood	Won with birdie on second extra hole
5	2001	WGC-World Cup (with (South Africa) Retief Goosen)	Denmark − Thomas Bjørn and Søren Hansen, New Zealand − Michael Campbell and David Smail, United States − David Duval and Tiger Woods	Won with par on second extra hole New Zealand and United States eliminated by birdie on first hole
6	2001	Nedbank Golf Challenge	(Spain) Sergio García	Lost to birdie on first extra hole

=== PGA Tour Champions wins (7) ===
Legend
PGA Tour Champions major championships (1)
Other PGA Tour Champions (6)

No.	Date	Tournament	Winning score	Margin of victory	Runner(s)-up
1	8 Mar 2020	Hoag Classic	−16 (66-64-67=197)	2 strokes	(United States) Fred Couples, (United States) Glen Day, (Sweden) Robert Karlsson
2	11 Oct 2020	SAS Championship	−12 (70-68-66=204)	1 stroke	(Scotland) Colin Montgomerie
3	19 Mar 2023	Hoag Classic (2)	−13 (70-65-65=200)	1 stroke	(United States) Doug Barron, (United States) Steve Stricker
4	2 Jun 2024	Principal Charity Classic	−21 (62-68-65=195)	2 strokes	(Canada) Stephen Ames
5	9 Jun 2024	American Family Insurance Championship	−12 (71-64-69=204)	Playoff	(United States) Steve Stricker
6	14 Jul 2024	Kaulig Companies Championship	−10 (70-68-64-68=270)	1 stroke	(South Korea) Yang Yong-eun
7	20 Jan 2025	Mitsubishi Electric Championship at Hualalai	−18 (67-65-66=198)	2 strokes	(Germany) Alex Čejka, (Spain) Miguel Ángel Jiménez, (Germany) Bernhard Langer

PGA Tour Champions playoff record (1–2)

No.	Year	Tournament	Opponent(s)	Result
1	2020	Mitsubishi Electric Championship at Hualalai	(United States) Fred Couples, (Spain) Miguel Ángel Jiménez	Jiménez won with birdie on second extra hole Couples eliminated by par on first hole
2	2024	American Family Insurance Championship	(United States) Steve Stricker	Won with par on first extra hole
3	2025	The Ally Challenge	(United States) Stewart Cink	Lost to par on first extra hole

== Major championships ==
=== Wins (4) ===
Year	Championship	54 holes	Winning score	Margin	Runner(s)-up
1994	U.S. Open	2 shot lead	−5 (69-71-66-73=279)	Playoff^{1}	(Scotland) Colin Montgomerie, (United States) Loren Roberts
1997	U.S. Open (2)	2 shot deficit	−4 (71-67-69-69=276)	1 stroke	(Scotland) Colin Montgomerie
2002	The Open Championship	2 shot lead	−6 (70-66-72-70=278)	Playoff^{2}	(Australia) Stuart Appleby, (Australia) Steve Elkington, (France) Thomas Levet
2012	The Open Championship (2)	6 shot deficit	−7 (67-70-68-68=273)	1 stroke	(Australia) Adam Scott

^{1}Defeated Montgomerie in 18-hole playoff and Roberts in sudden-death: Els (74-4-4), Roberts (74-4-5), Montgomerie (78)
^{2}Defeated Appleby and Elkington in 4-hole playoff and Levet in sudden-death: Els (4-3-5-4-par), Appleby (4-3-5-5), Elkington (5-3-4-5), Levet (4-2-5-5-bogey)

=== Results timeline ===
Results not in chronological order in 2020.

Tournament	1989	1990	1991	1992	1993	1994	1995	1996	1997	1998	1999
Masters Tournament						T8	CUT	T12	T17	T16	T27
U.S. Open					T7	1	CUT	T5	1	T49	CUT
The Open Championship	CUT			T5	T6	T24	T11	T2	T10	T29	T24
PGA Championship				CUT	CUT	T25	T3	T61	T53	T21	CUT

Tournament	2000	2001	2002	2003	2004	2005	2006	2007	2008	2009
Masters Tournament	2	T6	T5	T6	2	47	T27	CUT	CUT	CUT
U.S. Open	T2	T66	T24	T5	T9	T15	T26	T51	T14	CUT
The Open Championship	T2	T3	1	T18	2	T34	3	T4	T7	T8
PGA Championship	T34	T13	T34	T5	T4		T16	3	T31	T6

Tournament	2010	2011	2012	2013	2014	2015	2016	2017	2018
Masters Tournament	T18	T47		T13	CUT	T22	CUT	53	
U.S. Open	3	CUT	9	T4	T35	T54	CUT	T55	CUT
The Open Championship	CUT	CUT	1	T26	CUT	T65	CUT	61	CUT
PGA Championship	T18	CUT	T48	CUT	T7	T25	T66	CUT	

Tournament	2019	2020	2021	2022	2023	2024
Masters Tournament						
PGA Championship						
U.S. Open	CUT					
The Open Championship	T32	NT	CUT	CUT	CUT	WD

Win
Top 10
Did not play

CUT = missed the half-way cut
T = tied
WD = withdrew
NT = no tournament due to COVID-19 pandemic

=== Summary ===
Tournament	Wins	2nd	3rd	Top-5	Top-10	Top-25	Events	Cuts made
Masters Tournament	0	2	0	3	6	12	23	17
PGA Championship	0	0	2	4	6	12	25	19
U.S. Open	2	1	1	7	10	13	27	20
The Open Championship	2	3	2	9	13	17	33	23
Totals	4	6	5	23	35	54	108	79

- Most consecutive cuts made – 27 (2000 Masters – 2006 PGA)
- Longest streak of top-10s – 5 (2003 PGA – 2004 PGA)

== Results in The Players Championship ==
Tournament	1993	1994	1995	1996	1997	1998	1999
The Players Championship	CUT	T45	T68	T8	T10	T11	T17

Tournament	2000	2001	2002	2003	2004	2005	2006	2007	2008	2009
The Players Championship	T20	CUT	T44		T26	T17	T8	T37	T6	T45

Tournament	2010	2011	2012	2013	2014	2015	2016	2017
The Players Championship	CUT	CUT	CUT	CUT	T72	T66	T64	CUT

Top 10
Did not play

CUT = missed the halfway cut
"T" indicates a tie for a place

== World Golf Championships ==
=== Wins (2) ===
Year	Championship	54 holes	Winning score	Margin	Runner-up
2004	WGC-American Express Championship	2 shot lead	−18 (69-64-68-69=270)	1 stroke	(Denmark) Thomas Bjørn
2010	WGC-CA Championship (2)	Tied for lead	−18 (68-66-70-66=270)	4 strokes	(South Africa) Charl Schwartzel

=== Results timeline ===
Tournament	1999	2000	2001	2002	2003	2004	2005	2006	2007	2008	2009	2010	2011	2012	2013	2014
Match Play	R64	R32	4	R32	R64			R64	R64	R64	QF	R32	R32	R32	R64	4
Championship	T40	WD	NT^{1}	T23	T12	1		5	T11	75	T20	1	T15		T28	T52
Invitational	5	T12	T8	T15	T17	T65		T31	T22	T27	T29	T22	T37	T45	T48	T26
Champions											2	T6	T33	T2	T11	T46

^{1}Cancelled due to 9/11

Win
Top 10
Did not play

QF, R16, R32, R64 = Round in which player lost in match play
"T" = tied
WD = withdrew
NT = No tournament
Note that the HSBC Champions did not become a WGC event until 2009.

== Senior major championships ==
=== Wins (1) ===
Year	Championship	54 holes	Winning score	Margin	Runner-up
2024	Kaulig Companies Championship	1 shot deficit	−10 (70-68-64-68=270	1 stroke	(South Korea) Yang Yong-eun

=== Results timeline ===
Results not in chronological order

Tournament	2020	2021	2022	2023	2024	2025	2026
Senior PGA Championship	NT	T16	T14	T37	T6	T35	T27
The Tradition	NT	T4	T3	T2	T3	T19	T8
U.S. Senior Open	NT	T17	T13	T12	T8	T13	T11
Senior Players Championship	T5	5	T3	T3	1	T25	T23
Senior British Open Championship	NT	T8	T3			T5	T14

Win
Top 10
Did not play

"T" indicates a tie for a place
NT = no tournament due to COVID-19 pandemic

== PGA and European Tour career summary ==
	PGA Tour			European Tour		
Season	Wins (Majors)	Earnings (US$)	Rank	Wins (Majors)	Earnings	Rank
1991	0	2,647	274	0	£2,357	–
1992	0	18,420	213	0	£66,626	75
1993	0	38,185	190	0	£162,827	34
1994	1 (1)	684,440	19	2 (1)	£311,850	10
1995	1	842,590	14	1	£82,459	–
1996	1	906,944	14	0	£209,148	–
1997	2 (1)	1,243,008	9	2 (1)	£359,421	–
1998	1	763,783	36	1	£433,884	8
1999	1	1,710,756	15	1	€588,360	12
2000	1	3,469,405	3	1	€2,017,248	3
2001	0	2,336,456	15	0	€1,716,287	4
2002	2 (1)	3,291,895	5	3 (1)	€2,251,708	3
2003	2	3,371,237	9	4	€2,975,374	1
2004	3	5,787,225	2	3	€4,061,905	1
2005	0	1,627,184	47	3	€1,012,683	18
2006	0	2,326,220	28	1	€1,716,208	5
2007	0	2,705,715	20	2	€2,496,237	2
2008	1	2,537,290	20	0	€674,098	42
2009	0	2,147,157	36	0	€1,571,501	11
2010	2	4,558,861	3	1	€2,261,607	7
2011	0	948,872	93	1	€591,508	51
2012	1 (1)	3,453,118	16	1 (1)	€2,077,533	–
2013	0	1,173,761	74	1	€1,166,712	20
2014	0	1,799,569	55	1	€986,230	37
2015	0	453,579	159	0	€340,254	–
2016	0	559,024	148	0	€87,956	167
2017	0	155,926	207	0	€137,697	157
2018	0	102,868	208	0	€84,792	184
2019	0	304,590	186	0	€199,789	146
2020	0	18,673	239	0	€12,069	268
Career*	19 (4)	49,339,400	11	28 (4)	€28,894,967	5

* As of 27 September 2020.

These figures are from the respective tour's official sites. Note that there is double counting of money earned (and wins) in the majors and World Golf Championships since they became official events on both tours.

== Team appearances ==
Professional

- Alfred Dunhill Cup (representing South Africa): 1992, 1993, 1994, 1995, 1996, 1997 (winners), 1998 (winners), 1999, 2000
- World Cup (representing South Africa): 1992, 1993, 1996 (Individual and team winners), 1997, 2001 (winners)
- Presidents Cup (International team): 1996, 1998 (winners), 2000, 2003 (tie), 2007, 2009, 2011, 2013, 2019 (non-playing captain)
- Alfred Dunhill Challenge (representing Southern Africa): 1995 (winners)

== See also ==
- Big Easy Tour
- List of men's major championships winning golfers
- List of World Number One male golfers
- List of golfers with most PGA Tour wins
- List of golfers with most European Tour wins
- List of African golfers
- List of celebrities who own wineries and vineyards
- Monday Night Golf
