= Retief Goosen =

South African professional golfer (born 1969)

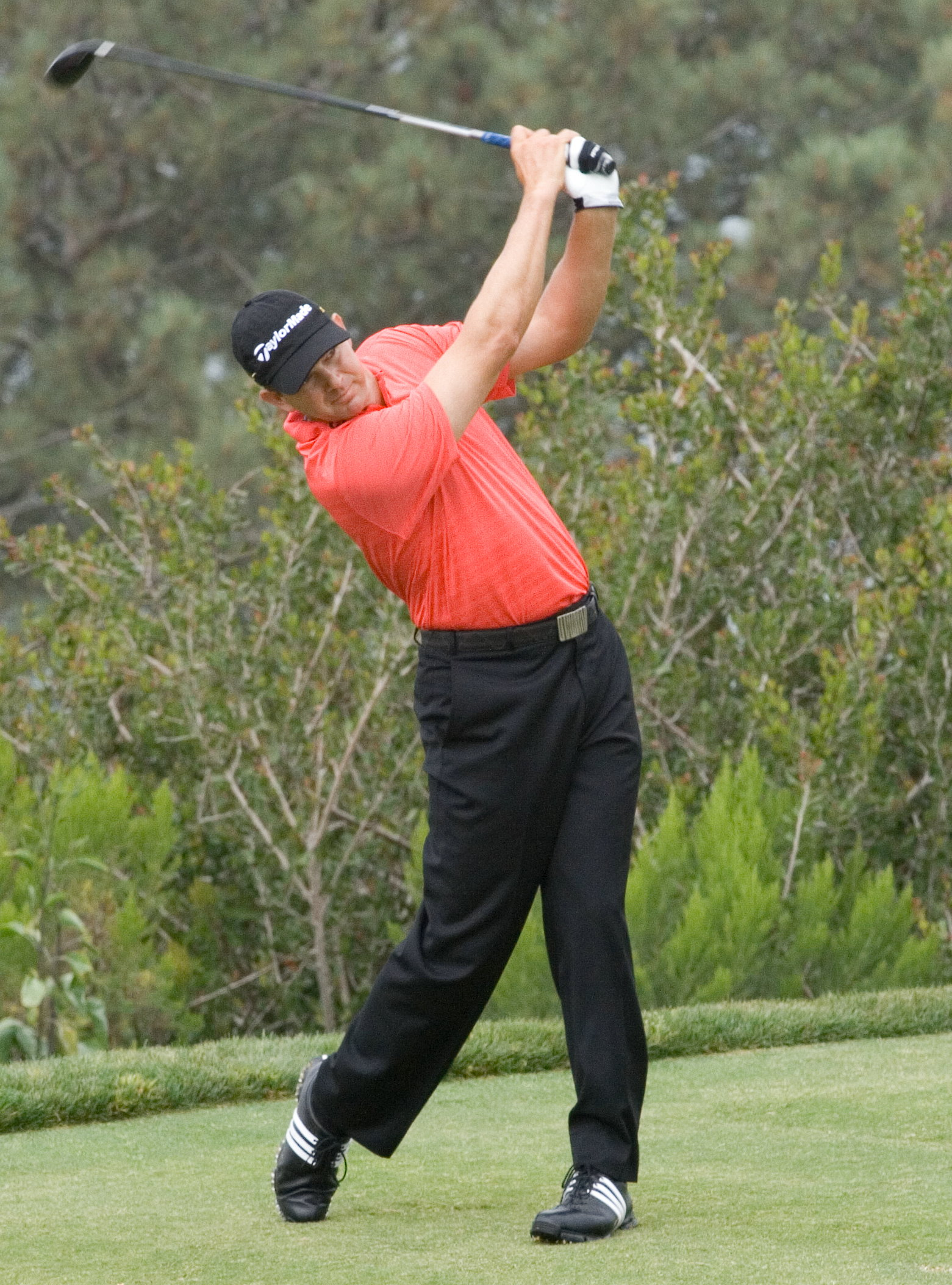
- Goosen in 2008

Personal information
- Full name: Retief Goosen
- Nicknames: The Goose, Iceman
- Nationality: South Africa
- Born: 3 February 1969 (age 57) Pietersburg, South Africa
- Height: 5 ft 11 in (180 cm)
- Weight: 185 lb (84 kg; 13.2 st)
- Spouse: Tracy Goosen (m. 2001)
- Children: 2

Career
- Sport: Golf
- Turned professional: 1990
- Current tour: PGA Tour Champions
- Former tours: European Tour; PGA Tour; Sunshine Tour
- Professional wins: 41
- Highest ranking: 3 (15 January 2006)

Number of wins by tour
- PGA Tour: 7
- European Tour: 14
- Asian Tour: 5
- Sunshine Tour: 6
- PGA Tour of Australasia: 1
- PGA Tour Champions: 5
- Other: 9

Best results in major championships (wins: 2)
- Masters Tournament: 2nd/T2: 2002, 2007
- PGA Championship: T6: 2005
- U.S. Open: Won: 2001, 2004
- The Open Championship: T5: 2005, 2009

Achievements and awards
- World Golf Hall of Fame: 2019 (member page)
- European Tour Order of Merit winner: 2001, 2002
- European Tour Golfer of the Year: 2001
- PGA Tour Champions Rookie of the Year: 2019
- PGA Tour Champions Byron Nelson Award: 2019

Retief Goosen (born 3 February 1969) is a South African professional golfer. He plays on the PGA Tour Champions. He has won two U.S. Opens, in 2001 and 2004, headed the European Tour Order of Merit in 2001 and 2002, and was in the top ten of the world rankings for over 250 weeks between 2001 and 2007. He was elected to the World Golf Hall of Fame, class of 2019.

== Early life ==
In 1969, Goosen was born in Pietersburg (now Polokwane), South Africa. He is the son of Theo Goosen, a local real estate agent, and amateur golfer who introduced the game of golf to Retief at an early age. Theo took a strict approach to parenting. "Look, I never made life easy for my kids," said Theo. "We never spoiled them. We never pleasurized them." Goosen admits that his father put pressure on him.

In 1987, Goosen was struck by lightning. He was golfing with his friend, Henri Potgieter at Pietersburg Golf Club. They were playing through a small drizzle when lightning struck Goosen. Potgieter was knocked from his feet and when he stood back up saw Retief lying on the ground on his back. Potgieter retold the story to Golf World, "I wanted to know his reaction. What I did see was his golf clubs and his golf bag. Then I saw him lying on his back. His tongue was down his throat and his eyes were backward, and he was breathing weird. He had no clothes on; they'd been burned from his body. I remember picking up his spectacles. I didn't know what to do. It looked like he was dead. I was screaming for help. Fortunately, there were guys teeing off on the 12th hole. They came running toward us. From then on, I can't remember much. They picked him up and put him in a car." Goosen's shoes had disintegrated from his feet, his underwear and watch band had melted to his body. He retains a scar on his wrist from the incident. He was unable to put his shoes on for weeks afterwards. He recovered enough to grab another set of clubs and take up the game a few weeks later. Goosen doesn't remember the events that happened, but his father took his son's survival as a sign from God of good things to come.

== Amateur career ==
In 1990, Goosen won the South African Amateur Championship, the leading amateur competition in his country.

== Professional career ==
=== Southern Africa Tour ===
In 1990, Goosen turned professional. During the 1991–92 Southern Africa Tour, he won one tournament and finished fifth on the Order of Merit.

=== European Tour ===
Goosen was medalist at the European Tour's Qualifying School in 1992, and had success on the Tour between 1992 and 2000, but it was not until 2001 that he made his name in America with a U.S. Open win on Southern Hills Country Club golf course. He nearly lost his chance at victory after three putting from 12 feet, missing a two foot putt on the final green, but managed to recover to make a playoff with the 1996 PGA Championship winner Mark Brooks. Goosen dominated the next day's 18-hole playoff, winning by two strokes. Later that summer, he completed his second wire-to-wire victory of the year at The Scottish Open at Loch Lomond. He finished 2001 with three wins, 11 top-tens and the European Tour Order of Merit and followed it up with another in 2002. He also became the first non-European to win the Order of Merit. After his third win of the 2001 season, he rose to a career-high 11th in the world rankings. In 2002, he won on both the PGA Tour and European Tour for the second straight year, a feat that would be repeated for three more years. He won a second U.S. Open in 2004, where he had 11 one-putts in the final round at a tough test at Shinnecock Hills Golf Club. He then rose to his career high world ranking position of 3rd. He won on the PGA Tour each year from 2001 to 2005 with six wins, and he added a seventh win in March 2009 at the Transitions Championship.

After winning medalist at the European Tour's Q-School in 1992, Goosen played 3 seasons before winning his first event in 1996 at the Slaley Hall Northumberland Challenge. He won the Alfred Dunhill Cup in 1997 and 1998 with Ernie Els and David Frost. Goosen played in the 2000 Presidents Cup where the U.S. team won, but Goosen scored 2 points in total in his 1st appearance in the event. Goosen won four times on the European Tour between 1996 and 2000, before his breakthrough year in the United States with his 2001 U.S. Open win. Two weeks after the U.S. Open win of 2001, Goosen won on the European Tour at The Scottish Open at Loch Lomond. This win secured Goosen the Player of the Month for June 2001 on the European Tour. He added another win late in the year and won the European Tour Order of Merit and the Player of the Year on the European Tour.

=== PGA Tour ===
Goosen was in contention in the U.S. Open at Southern Hills Country Club in 2001 all week, and battled Mark Brooks and Stewart Cink during the final round. After Brooks had posted 4 under par, and Goosen was at 5 under coming up 18, Cink had a chance to win until he three-putted the 72nd hole, leaving the battle for the trophy a two-man race between Brooks and Goosen. After Goosen hit his approach to 12 feet on 18, he had 2 putts to win and victory seemed imminent. Goosen put his first putt past the hole and was left with 22 inches for victory, but pushed the second putt across the right edge of the cup and was forced to make a putt longer than the one previous to force a playoff with Brooks.

Goosen won the Monday 18-hole playoff by 2 strokes with an even-par 70 and Brooks shooting a 2-over-par 72. It was Goosen's first victory on U.S. soil. He finished 47th on the PGA Tour money list with over $1,047,000 in a restricted season shared between the PGA and European Tours.

Goosen won the European Tour Order of Merit for a second straight year for a season that included a win at the Johnnie Walker Classic by a margin of 8 strokes. He had eight other top-10s on the season, two runner-up finishes, including a 2nd place to Tiger Woods at The Masters. Goosen won the money title in the end by a slim margin over Northern Ireland's Darren Clarke. Goosen also had his second win in the U.S. at the BellSouth Classic in April on the PGA Tour.

In 2003, Goosen won his second Trophee Lancome title in its final playing. It was his lone win on the European Tour in 2003, though he had five other top-10s on the season. 2003 was the first season where he played most of his events in the United States. He picked up his 3rd tour win at the Chrysler Championship in October. His 2003 season included 17 of 19 cuts made, 9 top-10s, a win and over $3,100,000 in earnings. Goosen played in the Presidents Cup for the International team where he scored 3 points for the week that ended with a tie because Tiger Woods and Ernie Els were involved in a playoff that was not over at sundown, so captains Gary Player and Jack Nicklaus decided that the 2003 matches would be a draw.

Goosen's second major title came at the 2004 U.S. Open at Shinnecock Hills. The USGA had prepared extremely tough conditions which were later argued by players as "unfair." The final-round scoring average of 78.7 was the second-highest since World War II, with only Goosen and Phil Mickelson finishing under par. He eventually won by two strokes over Mickelson as both men shot 1-over-par rounds of 71. Goosen had 11 one-putt greens on Sunday and 31 one-putts for the championship. He only needed 24 putts on the day in what is remembered as one of the most clutch putting performances in U.S. Open history. 2004 was the start of the "Big Five Era" which is used in describing the era in golf where Tiger Woods, Vijay Singh, Ernie Els, Retief Goosen, and Phil Mickelson dominated the game of golf. The five switched up and down the top five positions in the Official World Golf Ranking; most notably Singh's derailing of Woods as the number one golfer in the world. The five stayed, for the most part in the top five spots from 2004 till the start of 2007. Nine majors were won between them many fighting against each other head to head.

Goosen won the Tour Championship in November 2004, coming from four strokes behind on the final round with a 6-under-par 64 to win by four strokes over Tiger Woods. It was his second Tour win on the season and it secured him a career high 6th-place finish on the 2004 money list.

In 2005 Goosen was in pursuit of his third U.S. Open and his second in a row, leading by three strokes after three rounds of golf at the Pinehurst No. 2 course. However, he disappeared in the final round with a score of 81 and he ended up finishing in 11th place. In an interview after his round Goosen said "I messed up badly. I obviously threw this one away."

Even though Goosen finished T-11 in the U.S. Open in 2005, it was his worst finish in a major in 2005, he won The International by one point over Brandt Jobe for his 6th career win. His 2005 season included 8 top 10s, and over $3.4 million in earnings. Goosen played in his 3rd Presidents Cup in 2005, at an event where he defeated Tiger Woods in Sunday's singles matches and finished with 4 points. The final score was 18½–15½ for the United States.

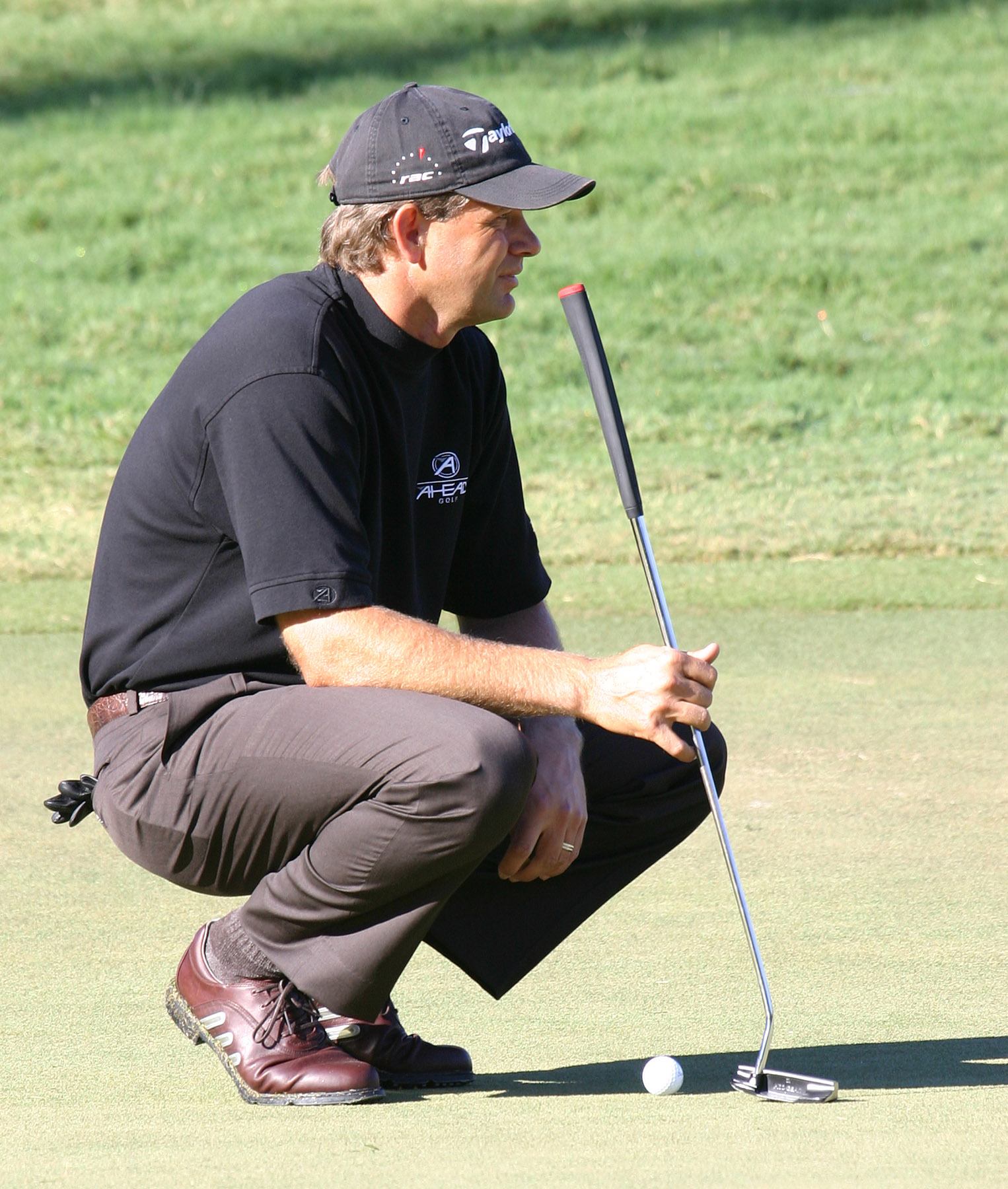
Goosen looking over a putt at the 2006 Chrysler Championship

Goosen has been a consistent player: he has won internationally every year since 1995, and also won a PGA Tour event every year from 2001 to 2005. Additionally, he has spent a long period of time in the top 5 of the Official World Golf Ranking, and in 2006 reached a career-best third place after a runner-up finish at The Players Championship to Stephen Ames and 5 other top 10s on the season. He also won on the European Tour at the South African Airways Open and at the Volkswagen Masters-China on the Asian Tour. He also won his match during the challenge season at the People vs. The Pros event. But from early 2007 to late 2008 he had had a dip in performance.

2007 was an average season for Goosen's standards; a victory at the Qatar Masters in January – when he finished birdie-eagle for the win, looked to be a sign of things to come along with being the European Tour player of the month in January. Goosen posed a threat on the final day at The Masters. He held the lead till a bogey on the par-three twelve, Goosen failed to rebound parring each of his six remaining holes. He finished tied for second, two behind Zach Johnson. However, after the Masters Goosen's best finish throughout the rest of the year was a tie for 15th at the BMW Asian Open, and he ended 2007 having slumped down to 26th in the world rankings.

Goosen's statistics on the PGA Tour at this time were surprisingly low. He was outside the top 100 in ball striking, greens in regulation, driving accuracy, distance, and putting. But this was due mainly, Goosen said, to the swing changes he had made, his hiring a swing coach for the first time in his career, and how he had lost all confidence in his game.

He was again a part of the International team at the 2007 Presidents Cup at the Royal Montreal Golf Club, just outside Montreal, Quebec, Canada. It was his fourth appearance in the event. He finished the week with 2 points, including a singles win of 2&1 over Jim Furyk on Sunday.

At the start of 2008, Goosen withdrew from the Qatar Masters as defending champion due to problems with his vision after undergoing corrective laser surgery ten days before the tournament began. He was forced to return to his home in London, England, for further treatment. In March, he showed a form that had left him for almost a year and resulted in a tie for second at the WGC-CA Championship. He putted exceptionally well thanks to his old Yes! putter he won both his U.S. Open titles with and named "Tracy" after his wife.

Retief Goosen at the 2008 Players Championship

Before the tournament Goosen was ranked 40th in the world, which was the lowest he had been ranked since 10 June 2001 (a week before the U.S. Open). His best finish in 2009 other than the runner-up at the WGC-CA Championship, was at the other stroke play WGC event, the WGC-Bridgestone Invitational, where he finished T4, two strokes behind winner Vijay Singh. It was his second of two top five finishes on the season. Although showing some signs of his old self, Goosen had a very inconsistent year finishing 72nd on the PGA Tour money list. In June 2008, he made controversial comments about fellow golfer Tiger Woods, alleging that Woods was faking the severity of his injuries at the 2008 U.S. Open. Goosen apologized for the comments saying he was not being serious when he made the claim.

His game was on the rise in late 2008. Late in the 2008 season Goosen replaced Vijay Singh because of injury in the Asian Tour's Iskandar Johor Open. Goosen won the tournament for his only win of 2008. The win also extended his streak of winning a professional golf event every year since 1995.

Goosen continued his good form from late 2008 into 2009. With two international wins in three months, it was a sign of good form to come throughout the season.

He started his 2009 season with two wins on two major tours. Goosen won his second event in four worldwide starts on the Sunshine Tour, at the Africa Open in January, where he came from behind with a final round 65 on Sunday to win by one stroke over four players and take the trophy. Goosen said he'd been struggling with his putting for the last few seasons, he put a belly putter in his bag for a few weeks to get his stroke back. He played with it for 3 weeks in January and February, starting at the Buick Invitational. He played well with it at the AT&T Pebble Beach National Pro-Am, where he was the 36-hole leader. He went on to finish 3rd for the rained-out 54-hole event. He then won his seventh PGA Tour title at the Transitions Championship in March 2009. He made only five bogeys all week on the tough Copperhead Course at Innisbrook Resort and Golf Club in Palm Harbor, Florida. He shot all four rounds under par, and finished at −8, to win by one stroke over Charles Howell III and Brett Quigley. His putting was exceptional during that week, making 55 of 55 putts from 5 feet and less, including a 4 1/2-foot putt for par on 18 for the win that fell in the left edge of the cup. Goosen credited Gary Player with inspiring him to rededicate himself to a new diet and fitness program. This win vaulted Goosen to number 22 in the Official World Golf Ranking, his highest position since November 2007.

With his rededication to his game with his work with his swing coach, Goosen statistically improved in 2009 from those of the 2007–2008 seasons before. He moved from driving distance from outside the top 100 to 82nd, to inside the top 40 in putting, 20th in scoring average and 49th in the all-around statistic.

After a tie for 16th place at the U.S. Open at Bethpage Black, Goosen was in contention the very next week in Munich, Germany at the BMW International Open. He led after the first three rounds at 17 under par, two ahead of Bernhard Langer and three ahead of Nick Dougherty. On Sunday, Goosen did not putt as well as he did the first three rounds, only managing a 1-under 71. He finished the week in 3rd, four strokes behind eventual winner Dougherty.

After a week off, Goosen was in contention the week before The Open Championship at the Barclays Scottish Open at Loch Lomond Golf Club in Glasgow. After a first round of 3-under par 68, he shot a second round 63, which was started by an un-Goosen like opening tee shot. He pulled out a 3-wood off the first tee, and barely got the ball airborne as Goosen topped it and put it in the right rough, as a couple of grouse scuttled for cover. But Goosen shot a second round 63 to pull two clear of Adam Scott after two rounds. He shot a disappointing final round of 73 to finish in a tie for 6th.

Goosen added a 3rd top-10 finish in as many starts worldwide at the 2009 Open Championship at Turnberry. He contended for most of the week and had a share of the lead momentarily during the 3rd round. He finished the event in a tie for 5th, 2 strokes out of the playoff between Stewart Cink and Tom Watson. Goosen almost picked up his second PGA Tour win of the season at the RBC Canadian Open the following week. Goosen faced Nathan Green in a playoff after the two players shot −18 after four rounds of play. Goosen had a six-foot birdie putt to win the tournament on the first playoff hole but missed it. Green had a twelve-foot birdie putt to win the tournament on the second hole and missed it but it did not matter. Goosen had to sink a nine-foot par putt to extend the playoff but he missed it, giving Green his first PGA Tour victory.

Goosen had another close call at victory during the 2009 FedEx Cup Playoffs at the Deutsche Bank Championship, where he was the 54-hole co-leader with Sean O'Hair and Steve Stricker, but he shot a final round of Even Par to finish T8.

Goosen added 4 consecutive top 10 finishes in October and November; 6th at the Portugal Masters, 3rd at the Iskandar Johor Open, where he shot a third round 62, 9th at the Volvo World Match Play Championship and 10th at the WGC-HSBC Champions.

Goosen started his 2010 campaign in January with 3 consecutive top-10 finishes. He finished 6th at the SBS Championship, 4th at the Sony Open in Hawaii and 9th at the Qatar Masters. Goosen added a quarterfinal loss to Camilo Villegas in February at the WGC-Accenture Match Play Championship, his best appearance in the event since 2006. Goosen had a good title defense at the Transitions Championship in March, where he finished 5th. A week later at the Arnold Palmer Invitational, Goosen finished in a tie for 4th, his fifth top-10 in seven 2010 PGA Tour events, and his 11th top-10 finish in his last 14 events worldwide. The 4th-place finish moved Goosen to 15th in the Official World Golf Ranking.

On 27 April 2010, Goosen broke his toe while playing with his children. /The injury caused Goosen to miss the Quail Hollow Championship and The Players Championship. On 18 May, in an incident separate to his toe injury, Goosen injured his hand. This injury caused Goosen to miss the BMW PGA Championship, one of the premier events on the European Tour. Goosen returned to the PGA Tour in June at the St. Jude Classic, the week before the U.S. Open. He finished T15 at the St. Jude Classic. After the U.S. Open, Goosen flew to Canada to play in the Telus World Skins Game, where he won 5 skins. Two days after that, he played in the Travelers Championship, where he finished T5, his 6th top-10 finish of the season.

At the 2010 Open Championship at St Andrews, Goosen finished 6th, breaking par in all four rounds. It was Goosen's 7th top-10 finish of the season. Goosen had his first top-3 finish of the season in August at the WGC-Bridgestone Invitational, his 8th top-10 of the season.

After a 7th-place finish at the BMW Championship, Goosen played in the final group on Sunday at The Tour Championship with eventual winner Jim Furyk. Goosen finished 3rd on his own. Goosen finished 10th in the final standings of the 2010 FedEx Cup Playoffs. He finished his 2010 PGA Tour season with 10 top-10s, and over $3.2 million in earnings. In December, Goosen finished runner-up to Ernie Els at the South African Open in Durban. Goosen finished at 24 under par, one stroke behind Els.

Despite a strong start to the season, with two top-3 finishes by January, Goosen ended the year with his worst season since 1995. Goosen withdrew from both The Open Championship and the PGA Championship after poor first rounds, citing injuries. Goosen had to deal with back injuries for the entire second half of the 2011 season. At the end of the year, he had dropped out of the top 50 in the world rankings for the first time in over a decade.

Goosen started his 2012 campaign on the European Tour with three consecutive starts in January in South Africa. He finished 3rd in the Africa Open, and 16th in the Joburg Open before finishing tied second with Ernie Els in the Volvo Golf Champions, losing to winner Branden Grace in a playoff. Through the first three weeks of season, Goosen was second in the Race to Dubai.

For the first time since 1999, Goosen did not play in the Masters, as he was outside the Top 50 in the OWGR.

Goosen started his 2013 campaign internationally, finishing 20th at the Volvo Golf Champions and missing the cut at the Qatar Masters. Goosen made 9 starts on the PGA tour making 6 cuts, including 9th at AT&T National. He re-injured his back at The Players Championship, causing him to withdraw from the tournament. After months of time off, Goosen returned to action on the European Tour in September for two tournaments, finishing 63rd and 66th.

Goosen showed hopeful signs during the 2013–14 season. Focused only on the PGA Tour, Goosen made 19 of the 26 cuts, including 14 straight cuts to finish the season, while earning over $825k.

Goosen started off the 2014–15 PGA Tour season with a 3rd-place finish at the Frys.com Open. Goosen finished 2014 making 2 out of 3 cuts, finishing 33rd at the CIMB Classic and 65th at the OHL Classic. He held the lead at the 2015 Northern Trust Open for the first three rounds. A final round 75 dropped him to a tie for 8th finish. He was able to qualify for the U.S. Open via a local qualifying tournament, but missed the cut. He continued to compete in several tournaments. After firing an opening round of 66 (−6) at the 2015 Open Championship to place him into second place, he stayed in the top 10 for the first three rounds, but a final round 74 saw him fall into a 20th place. Two weeks later at the Quicken Loans National tournament, he took the 18-hole lead after an opening round −8, 63. But he stalled the final three rounds and finished 46th.

=== PGA Tour Champions ===
In 2019, Goosen turned 50, started playing on the PGA Tour Champions and was elected to the World Golf Hall of Fame. On 14 July 2019, Goosen won his first title on the PGA Tour Champions. It was a major tournament, the Bridgestone Senior Players Championship. In the final round, Goosen birdied the final two holes at Firestone Country Club in Akron, Ohio, to win by two strokes over Jay Haas and Tim Petrovic. Because of issues with lockdowns, he was not invited to the next subsequent official playing of the Players Championship, as is normally offered.

On 15 January 2020, Goosen received the PGA Tour Champions Rookie of the Year for 2019. In March 2022, Goosen won the Hoag Classic on PGA Tour Champions in Newport Beach, California.

== Personal life ==
Goosen has the nickname "The Iceman" on the PGA Tour, because of his calm demeanour. He is also called "The Goose." Goosen's mother attributes her son's calm demeanour to the effects left on Goosen after he was struck by lightning.

Retief has played in the Nelson Mandela Invitational hosted by Gary Player in South Africa, honoring former South African President Nelson Mandela. He has won the event twice, in betterball in 2000 with Allan Henning, and in 2006 with Bobby Lincoln. He also won the fourball event in 2008 with Costantino Rocca, and Alan Pearson.

Goosen owns his own vineyard in Garden Route, South Africa. The vineyard is situated 2500 feet above sea level and was deemed a great place to plant in 1993. He started growing plants on the vineyard in 2005, and labelled his wine The Goose. The Goose Expression Cabernet Sauvignon Shiraz wine won the bronze medal in 2008 from the Decanter World Wide Wine. In 2009, Goosen won awards for both his Goose wines. This follows on from last year's bronze medal for The Expression Cabernet Sauvignon / Shiraz 2005. 2009 brought a Silver Medal each by The Decanter World Wine Award 2009 for The Expression Cabernet Sauvignon / Shiraz 2007 and The Goose Sauvignon Blanc 2008.

In May 2025, Goosen was part of President Cyril Ramaphosa's entourage that went to meet U.S President Donald Trump over allegations of Afrikaner genocide and persecution in South Africa.

== Awards and honors ==
- In 2001, Goosen earned the European Tour Golfer of the Year award.
- In 2001 and 2002, he led the European Tour's Order of Merit.
- In 2018, Goosen was elected to the World Golf Hall of Fame. He was inducted in 2019.
- In 2019, he earned Rookie of the Year honors for the PGA Tour Champions. Goosen also earned the tour's Byron Nelson Award that year, bestowed to the player with the lowest scoring average over the course of the season.

== Amateur wins ==
- 1985/86 Transvaal Amateur Team
- 1990 South African Amateur, Kempton Park Classic

== Professional wins (41) ==
=== PGA Tour wins (7) ===
Legend
Major championships (2)
Tour Championships (1)
Other PGA Tour (4)

No.	Date	Tournament	Winning score	Margin of victory	Runner(s)-up
1	18 Jun 2001	U.S. Open	−4 (66-70-69-71=276)	Playoff	(United States) Mark Brooks
2	7 Apr 2002	BellSouth Classic	−16 (68-66-68-70=272)	4 strokes	(Sweden) Jesper Parnevik
3	2 Nov 2003	Chrysler Championship	−12 (69-66-67-70=272)	3 strokes	(Fiji) Vijay Singh
4	20 Jun 2004	U.S. Open (2)	−4 (70-66-69-71=276)	2 strokes	(United States) Phil Mickelson
5	7 Nov 2004	The Tour Championship	−11 (70-66-69-64=269)	4 strokes	(United States) Tiger Woods
6	7 Aug 2005	The International	32 pts (7-10-8-7=32)	1 point	(United States) Brandt Jobe
7	22 Mar 2009	Transitions Championship (2)	−8 (69-68-69-70=276)	1 stroke	(United States) Charles Howell III, (United States) Brett Quigley

PGA Tour playoff record (1–1)

No.	Year	Tournament	Opponent	Result
1	2001	U.S. Open	(United States) Mark Brooks	Won 18-hole playoff; Goosen: E (70), Brooks: +2 (72)
2	2009	RBC Canadian Open	(Australia) Nathan Green	Lost to par on second extra hole

=== European Tour wins (14) ===
Legend
Major championships (2)
Other European Tour (12)

No.	Date	Tournament	Winning score	Margin of victory	Runner(s)-up
1	16 Jun 1996	Slaley Hall Northumberland Challenge	−11 (66-69-70-72=277)	2 strokes	(Scotland) Ross Drummond
2	29 Jun 1997	Peugeot Open de France	−17 (64-67-70-70=271)	1 stroke	(England) Jamie Spence
3	9 May 1999	Novotel Perrier Open de France (2)	−12 (69-65-68-70=272)	Playoff	(New Zealand) Greg Turner
4	17 Sep 2000	Trophée Lancôme	−13 (69-71-64-67=271)	1 stroke	(New Zealand) Michael Campbell
5	17 Jun 2001	U.S. Open	−4 (66-70-69-71=276)	Playoff	(United States) Mark Brooks
6	15 Jul 2001	Scottish Open	−16 (62-69-66-71=268)	3 strokes	(Denmark) Thomas Bjørn
7	28 Oct 2001	Telefónica Open de Madrid	−20 (66-64-66-68=264)	Playoff	(England) Steve Webster
8	27 Jan 2002	Johnnie Walker Classic^{1,2}	−14 (70-68-63-73=274)	8 strokes	(Sweden) Pierre Fulke
9	14 Sep 2003	Trophée Lancôme (2)	−18 (63-65-68-70=266)	4 strokes	(Republic of Ireland) Paul McGinley
10	20 Jun 2004	U.S. Open (2)	−4 (70-66-69-71=276)	2 strokes	(United States) Phil Mickelson
11	4 Jul 2004	Smurfit European Open	−13 (69-66-72-68=275)	5 strokes	(Australia) Richard Green, (Australia) Peter O'Malley, (England) Lee Westwood
12	11 Sep 2005	Linde German Masters	−20 (67-68-66-67=268)	1 stroke	(England) Nick Dougherty
13	18 Dec 2005 (2006 season)	South African Airways Open^{3}	−10 (73-70-69-70=282)	1 stroke	(South Africa) Ernie Els
14	28 Jan 2007	Commercialbank Qatar Masters^{1}	−15 (65-68-71-69=273)	1 stroke	(Australia) Nick O'Hern

^{1}Co-sanctioned by the Asian Tour
^{2}Co-sanctioned by the PGA Tour of Australasia
^{3}Co-sanctioned by the Sunshine Tour

European Tour playoff record (3–3)

No.	Year	Tournament	Opponent(s)	Result
1	1999	Novotel Perrier Open de France	(New Zealand) Greg Turner	Won with par on second extra hole
2	1999	German Open	(Sweden) Jarmo Sandelin	Lost to par on first extra hole
3	2001	U.S. Open	(United States) Mark Brooks	Won 18-hole playoff; Goosen: E (70), Brooks: +2 (72)
4	2001	Telefónica Open de Madrid	(England) Steve Webster	Won with birdie on third extra hole
5	2006	BMW International Open	(Republic of Ireland) Pádraig Harrington, (Sweden) Henrik Stenson	Stenson won with eagle on first extra hole
6	2012	Volvo Golf Champions	(South Africa) Ernie Els, (South Africa) Branden Grace	Grace won with birdie on first extra hole

=== Asian Tour wins (5) ===
No.	Date	Tournament	Winning score	Margin of victory	Runner-up
1	27 Jan 2002	Johnnie Walker Classic^{1,2}	−14 (70-68-63-73=274)	8 strokes	(Sweden) Pierre Fulke
2	4 Sep 2005	Volkswagen Masters-China	−22 (64-67-71-64=266)	6 strokes	(New Zealand) Michael Campbell
3	15 Oct 2006	Volkswagen Masters-China (2)	−21 (64-65-67-71=267)	3 strokes	(New Zealand) Michael Campbell
4	28 Jan 2007	Commercialbank Qatar Masters^{1}	−15 (65-68-71-69=273)	1 stroke	(Australia) Nick O'Hern
5	2 Nov 2008	Iskandar Johor Open	−12 (72-69-69-66=276)	2 strokes	(Thailand) Thaworn Wiratchant

^{1}Co-sanctioned by the European Tour
^{2}Co-sanctioned by the PGA Tour of Australasia

=== Sunshine Tour wins (6) ===
Legend
Flagship events (1)
Other Sunshine Tour (5)

No.	Date	Tournament	Winning score	Margin of victory	Runner(s)-up
1	11 Jan 1992	Spoornet Classic	−12 (65-76-67-68=276)	1 stroke	(South Africa) John Bland, (South Africa) Richard Kaplan
2	24 Jan 1993	Mount Edgecombe Trophy	−9 (70-71-69-69=279)	5 strokes	(Zimbabwe) Nick Price
3	12 Feb 1995	Phillips South African Open	−13 (70-65-70-70=275)	5 strokes	(South Africa) Ernie Els
4	3 Feb 2002	Dimension Data Pro-Am	−20 (63-70-69-66=268)	3 strokes	(Scotland) Scott Drummond
5	18 Dec 2005	South African Airways Open^{1} (2)	−10 (73-70-69-68=282)	1 stroke	(South Africa) Ernie Els
6	18 Jan 2009	Africa Open Golf Challenge	−21 (66-70-66-65=267)	1 stroke	(Northern Ireland) Darren Clarke, (South Africa) Darren Fichardt, (South Africa) Branden Grace, (Northern Ireland) Michael Hoey

^{1}Co-sanctioned by the European Tour

=== Other wins (9) ===
Legend
World Golf Championships (1)
Other wins (8)

No.	Date	Tournament	Winning score	Margin of victory	Runner(s)-up
1	25 Apr 1991	Iscor Newcastle Classic	−14 (69-63-70=202)	1 stroke	(South Africa) Derek James
2	11 Jul 1992	Bushveld Classic	−12 (69-68-67=204)	6 strokes	(South Africa) Derek James
3	11 Oct 1992	Highveld Classic	−17 (69-66-64=199)	1 stroke	(South Africa) Ashley Roestoff
4	26 Nov 2000	Nelson Mandela Invitational (with (South Africa) Allan Henning)	−1 (71-72=143)	1 stroke	
5	18 Nov 2001	WGC-World Cup (with (South Africa) Ernie Els)	−24 (64-71-63-66=264)	Playoff	Denmark − Thomas Bjørn and Søren Hansen, New Zealand − Michael Campbell and David Smail, United States − David Duval and Tiger Woods
6	16 Nov 2003	Tiger Skins Game	$130,000	$95,000	(Sweden) Annika Sörenstam
7	5 Dec 2004	Nedbank Golf Challenge	−7 (70-71-71-69=281)	6 strokes	(Australia) Stuart Appleby, (South Africa) Ernie Els
8	26 Nov 2006	Nelson Mandela Invitational (2) (with (South Africa) Bobby Lincoln)	−16 (62-66=128)	Playoff	(South Africa) John Bland and (South Africa) Alan Michell
9	16 Nov 2008	Riffa Views Skins Game	$151,000	$71,000	(Scotland) Colin Montgomerie

Other playoff record (2–3)

No.	Year	Tournament	Opponent(s)	Result
1	2001	WGC-World Cup (with (South Africa) Ernie Els)	Denmark − Thomas Bjørn and Søren Hansen, New Zealand − Michael Campbell and David Smail, United States − David Duval and Tiger Woods	Won with par on second extra hole New Zealand and United States eliminated by birdie on first hole
2	2003	Nedbank Golf Challenge	(Spain) Sergio García	Lost to birdie on first extra hole
3	2005	Nedbank Golf Challenge	(Northern Ireland) Darren Clarke, (United States) Jim Furyk, (Australia) Adam Scott	Furyk won with birdie on second extra hole Goosen eliminated by par on first hole
4	2006	Nelson Mandela Invitational (with (South Africa) Bobby Lincoln)	(South Africa) John Bland and (South Africa) Alan Michell	Won with eagle on second extra hole
5	2019	PNC Father-Son Challenge (with son Leo Goosen)	(Germany) Bernhard Langer and son Jason Langer, (United States) Tom Lehman and son Thomas Lehman	Team Langer won with eagle on first extra hole

=== PGA Tour Champions wins (5) ===
Legend
Senior major championships (1)
Other PGA Tour Champions (4)

No.	Date	Tournament	Winning score	Margin of victory	Runner(s)-up
1	14 Jul 2019	Bridgestone Senior Players Championship	−6 (69-62-75-68=274)	2 strokes	(United States) Jay Haas, (United States) Tim Petrovic
2	6 Mar 2022	Hoag Classic	−15 (68-67-63=198)	4 strokes	(South Korea) K. J. Choi
3	31 Mar 2024	Galleri Classic	−13 (66-68-69=203)	1 stroke	(New Zealand) Steven Alker, (Germany) Alex Čejka, (Argentina) Ricardo González
4	14 Sep 2025	Sanford International	−13 (65-65-66=197)	2 strokes	(United States) Bo Van Pelt
5	27 Apr 2026	Mitsubishi Electric Classic	39 pts (14-12-13=39)	2 points	(Canada) Stephen Ames

PGA Tour Champions playoff record (0–3)

No.	Year	Tournament	Opponent(s)	Result
1	2019	American Family Insurance Championship	(United States) Jerry Kelly, (United States) Steve Stricker	Kelly won with birdie on third extra hole
2	2019	Charles Schwab Cup Championship	(United States) Jeff Maggert	Lost to eagle on third extra hole
3	2025	Insperity Invitational	(United States) Stewart Cink	Lost to birdie on first extra hole

== Playoff record ==
Challenge Tour playoff record (0–1)

No.	Year	Tournament	Opponent	Result
1	1992	East Sussex National Challenge	(England) Simon D. Hurley	Lost to birdie on first extra hole

== Major championships ==
=== Wins (2) ===
Year	Championship	54 holes	Winning score	Margin	Runner-up
2001	U.S. Open	Tied for lead	−4 (66-70-69-71=276)	Playoff^{1}	(United States) Mark Brooks
2004	U.S. Open (2)	2 stroke lead	−4 (70-66-69-71=276)	2 strokes	(United States) Phil Mickelson

^{1}Defeated Brooks in an 18-hole playoff: Goosen 70 (E), Brooks 72 (+2).

=== Results timeline ===
Tournament	1993	1994	1995	1996	1997	1998	1999
Masters Tournament						CUT	
U.S. Open						CUT	CUT
The Open Championship	CUT			76	T10	CUT	T10
PGA Championship					T61	CUT	CUT

Tournament	2000	2001	2002	2003	2004	2005	2006	2007	2008	2009
Masters Tournament	T40	CUT	2	T13	T13	T3	T3	T2	T17	CUT
U.S. Open	T12	1	CUT	T42	1	T11	CUT	CUT	T14	T16
The Open Championship	T41	T13	T8	T10	T7	T5	T14	T23	T32	T5
PGA Championship	CUT	T37	T23	CUT		T6	T34	T23	T24	T51

Tournament	2010	2011	2012	2013	2014	2015	2016	2017	2018
Masters Tournament	T38	CUT							
U.S. Open	T58	T23	T10		T45	CUT	CUT		
The Open Championship	6	WD	T64			T20			CUT
PGA Championship	T55	WD	T48						

Win
Top 10
Did not play

CUT = missed the half-way cut
WD = withdrew
"T" = tied

=== Summary ===
Tournament	Wins	2nd	3rd	Top-5	Top-10	Top-25	Events	Cuts made
Masters Tournament	0	2	2	4	4	7	13	9
U.S. Open	2	0	0	2	3	8	18	11
The Open Championship	0	0	0	2	8	12	20	16
PGA Championship	0	0	0	0	1	4	15	10
Totals	2	2	2	8	16	31	66	46

- Most consecutive cuts made – 8 (2004 Masters – 2006 Masters)
- Longest streak of top-10s – 3 (twice)

== Results in The Players Championship ==
Tournament	1998	1999
The Players Championship	CUT	

Tournament	2000	2001	2002	2003	2004	2005	2006	2007	2008	2009
The Players Championship	CUT	CUT	T14	CUT	CUT	T12	2	T28	T51	T22

Tournament	2010	2011	2012	2013	2014	2015	2016
The Players Championship		T61	CUT	WD	T48	CUT	T12

Top 10
Did not play

CUT = missed the halfway cut
WD = withdrew
"T" indicates a tie for a place

== Results in World Golf Championships ==
Tournament	1999	2000	2001	2002	2003	2004	2005	2006	2007	2008	2009	2010	2011	2012
Match Play		R32	R32	R32	R64	R64	3	QF	R32	R64	R64	QF	R64	R64
Championship	T25	T24	NT^{1}	2	T8	T6		T45	T58	T2	T66	T56	T31	T45
Invitational		T12	T10	T11	T17		T58	T48	T61	T4	T29	T3	T23	T29
Champions											T10	T6		

^{1}Cancelled due to 9/11

Top 10
Did not play

QF, R16, R32, R64 = Round in which player lost in match play
"T" = tied
WD = withdrew
NT = No Tournament
Note that the HSBC Champions did not become a WGC event until 2009.

== Senior major championships ==
=== Wins (1) ===
Year	Championship	54 holes	Winning score	Margin	Runners-up
2019	Bridgestone Senior Players Championship	1 shot deficit	−6 (69-62-75-68=274)	2 strokes	(United States) Jay Haas, (United States) Tim Petrovic

=== Results timeline ===
Results not in chronological order

Tournament	2019	2020	2021	2022	2023	2024	2025	2026
Senior PGA Championship	4	NT	T3	T33	T31	T9	T4	T17
The Tradition	T22	NT	T8	T26	T50	T50	T9	19
U.S. Senior Open	T14	NT	T2	T18	T6	T31	T53	T5
Senior Players Championship	1	T28	T28	T35	T16	T21	T7	T28
Senior British Open Championship	T3	NT		T16		T37	T31	T21

Win
Top 10
Did not play

"T" indicates a tie for a place
NT = no tournament due to COVID-19 pandemic

== PGA and European Tour career summary ==
	PGA Tour			European Tour		
Season	Wins (Majors)	Earnings (US$)	Rank	Wins (Majors)	Earnings	Rank
1992	0	–	–	0	£2,760	207
1993	0	–	–	0	£147,256	44
1994	0	–	–	0	£140,821	39
1995	0	20,652	237	0	£62,744	94
1996	0	7,363	207	1	£215,428]	25
1997	0	45,048	209	1	£394,598	7
1998	0	–	–	0	£191,25]	33
1999	0	–	–	1	€1,059,985	5
2000	0	–	–	1	€892,759	15
2001	1 (1)	1,126,985	47	3 (1)	€2,862,806	1
2002	1	2,617,004	10	1	€2,360,128	1
2003	1	3,166,373	10	1	€1,115,886	12
2004	2 (1)	3,885,573	6	2 (1)	€2,325,202	2
2005	1	3,494,106	8	1	€2,261,211	4
2006	0	2,617,453	19	1	€1,367,399	12
2007	0	1,044,386	93	1	€1,478,245	9
2008	0	1,431,965	72	0	€1,051,335	15
2009	1	3,232,650	11	0	€970,851	27
2010	0	3,218,089	14	0	€994,342	24
2011	0	796,360	108	0	€752,573	42
2012	0	571,174	136	0	€685,815	45
2013	0	315,702	160	0	€45,088	n/a
2014	0	826,073	114	0	€34,052	n/a
2015	0	921,830	112	0	€173,574	n/a
2016	0	745,735	125	0	€0	n/a
2017	0	414,363	163	0	€0	n/a
2018	0	545,364	152	0	€14,862	n/a
2019	0	0	n/a	0	€0	n/a
2021	0	6,810	246	0	€0	n/a
Career*	7 (2)	31,301,518	39	14 (2)	€21,733,473	12

* As of the 2021 seasons.

These figures are from the respective tour's official sites. Note that there is double counting of money earned (and wins) in the majors and World Golf Championships since they became official events on both tours.

Green background for Tour's leading money winner. Yellow background for top-10 on Tour's money list.

== Team appearances ==
Professional

- World Cup (representing South Africa): 1993, 1995, 2000, 2001 (winners), 2007
- Alfred Dunhill Cup (representing South Africa): 1995, 1996, 1997 (winners), 1998 (winners), 1999, 2000
- Alfred Dunhill Challenge (representing Southern Africa): 1995 (winners)
- Presidents Cup (International team): 2000, 2003 (tie), 2005, 2007, 2009, 2011
- Tavistock Cup (representing Lake Nona): 2004, 2005, 2006, 2007 (winners), 2008, 2009 (winners), 2010 (winners)

== See also ==
- List of golfers with most European Tour wins
- List of golfers with most Asian Tour wins
- List of men's major championships winning golfers
- List of African golfers
- People vs. The Pros
- Monday Night Golf
