= 2014 U.S. Open (golf) =

Coordinates: 35.190°N 79.468°W

Tournament information
- Dates: June 12–15, 2014
- Location: Pinehurst, North Carolina
- Courses: Pinehurst Resort, Course No. 2
- Organized by: USGA
- Tours: PGA Tour; European Tour; Japan Golf Tour

Statistics
- Par: 70
- Length: 7,562 yards (6,915 m)
- Field: 156 players, 67 after cut
- Cut: 145 (+5)
- Prize fund: $9,000,000 €6,665,578
- Winner's share: $1,620,000 €1,199,804

Champion
- (Germany) Martin Kaymer
- 271 (−9)

Location in the United States
Location in North Carolina

The 2014 United States Open Championship was the 114th U.S. Open, played June 12–15 at the No. 2 Course of the Pinehurst Resort in Pinehurst, North Carolina.

Martin Kaymer led wire-to-wire to win his first U.S. Open and second major title, eight strokes ahead of runners-up Erik Compton and Rickie Fowler. He was the first to open a major with two rounds of 65 or better, and set a U.S. Open record for lowest 36-hole score at 130. From Germany, Kaymer was the first from continental Europe to win the U.S. Open and the fourth European winner in five years.

== Venue ==
This was the third U.S. Open played at Pinehurst's No. 2 Course and first after the 2010 Coore & Crenshaw restoration which stripped the course of all of its rough and returned it to its original design. The past champions were: Payne Stewart in 1999 and Michael Campbell in 2005. Designed by Donald Ross, the No. 2 Course opened in 1907 and also hosted the PGA Championship in 1936 and the Ryder Cup in 1951. The course hosted the 2014 U.S. Women's Open the following week, the first time the two championships were played on the same course in the same year.

=== Course layout ===
Course No. 2

Hole	Yards	Par	Hole	Yards	Par
1	402	4	10	617	5
2	507	4	11	483	4
3	387	4	12	484	4
4	529	4	13	382	4
5	576	5	14	473	4
6	219	3	15	202	3
7	424	4	16	528	4
8	502	4	17	205	3
9	191	3	18	451	4
Out	3,737	35	In	3,825	35
Source:		Total		7,562	70

Lengths of the course for previous U.S. Opens:

- 2005: 7,214 yards (6,596 m), par 70
- 1999: 7,175 yards (6,561 m), par 70

== Field ==
A record 10,127 entries were received.

About half the field consisted of players who were exempt from qualifying for the U.S. Open. Each player is classified according to the first category in which he qualified, and other categories are shown in parentheses.

1. Winners of the U.S. Open Championship during the last ten years

- Ángel Cabrera
- Lucas Glover
- Retief Goosen
- Graeme McDowell (13,14)
- Rory McIlroy (7,9,13,14)
- Geoff Ogilvy
- Justin Rose (11,12,13,14)
- Webb Simpson (12,13,14)
- Michael Campbell withdrew due to being "physically or mentally" unprepared.
- Tiger Woods (8,12,13,14) withdrew, as he was recovering from back surgery.

2. Winner and runner-up of the 2013 U.S. Amateur Championship

- Matt Fitzpatrick (a,4)
- Oliver Goss (a)

3. Winner of the 2013 Amateur Championship

- Garrick Porteous turned professional in April 2014, forfeiting his exemption.

4. Winner of the 2013 Mark H. McCormack Medal (men's World Amateur Golf Ranking)

5. Winners of the Masters Tournament during the last five years

- Phil Mickelson (6,11,12,13,14)
- Charl Schwartzel (12,13,14)
- Adam Scott (12,13,14)
- Bubba Watson (13,14)

6. Winners of The Open Championship during the last five years

- Stewart Cink
- Darren Clarke
- Ernie Els (11,13,14)
- Louis Oosthuizen (13,14)

7. Winners of the PGA Championship during the last five years

- Keegan Bradley (12,13,14)
- Jason Dufner (11,12,13,14)
- Martin Kaymer (8,13,14)
- Yang Yong-eun

8. Winners of The Players Championship during the last three years

- Matt Kuchar (12,13,14)

9. Winner of the 2014 European Tour BMW PGA Championship

10. Winner of the 2013 U.S. Senior Open Championship

- Kenny Perry

11. The 10 lowest scorers and anyone tying for 10th place at the 2013 U.S. Open Championship

- Nicolas Colsaerts
- Jason Day (12,13,14)
- Luke Donald (12,13,14)
- Gonzalo Fernández-Castaño (13,14)
- Rickie Fowler (13,14)
- Billy Horschel (12,13,14)
- Hunter Mahan (12,13,14)
- Hideki Matsuyama (13,14)
- Steve Stricker (12,13,14)

12. Players who qualified for the season-ending 2013 Tour Championship

- Roberto Castro
- Brendon de Jonge
- Graham DeLaet (13,14)
- Jim Furyk (13,14)
- Sergio García (13,14)
- Bill Haas (13,14)
- Dustin Johnson (13,14)
- Zach Johnson (13,14)
- D. A. Points
- Brandt Snedeker (13,14)
- Jordan Spieth (13,14)
- Henrik Stenson (13,14)
- Kevin Streelman (13,14)
- Nick Watney (13)
- Boo Weekley
- Gary Woodland (13,14)

13. The top 60 point leaders and ties as of May 26, 2014, in the Official World Golf Ranking

- Jonas Blixt (14)
- Jamie Donaldson (14)
- Victor Dubuisson (14)
- Harris English (14)
- Matt Every (14)
- Stephen Gallacher (14)
- Russell Henley (14)
- Thongchai Jaidee (14)
- Miguel Ángel Jiménez (14)
- Matt Jones (14)
- Chris Kirk (14)
- Pablo Larrazábal
- Joost Luiten (14)
- Francesco Molinari (14)
- Ryan Moore (14)
- Ryan Palmer (14)
- Ian Poulter (14)
- Patrick Reed (14)
- John Senden (14)
- Kevin Stadler (14)
- Brendon Todd (14)
- Jimmy Walker (14)
- Lee Westwood (14)
- Thomas Bjørn (14) and Richard Sterne (14) withdrew with injuries.

14. The top 60 point leaders and ties as of June 9, 2014, in the Official World Golf Ranking

- Kevin Na
- Bernd Wiesberger

15. Special exemptions given by the USGA

- None

The remaining contestants earned their places through sectional qualifiers.

- Japan: Lee Kyoung-hoon, Liang Wenchong, Kiyoshi Miyazato, David Oh, Toru Taniguchi, Azuma Yano
- England: Lucas Bjerregaard, Chris Doak, Niclas Fasth, Oliver Fisher, Simon Griffiths (L), Shiv Kapur, Maximilian Kieffer, Brooks Koepka, Tom Lewis, Shane Lowry, Garth Mulroy, Andrea Pavan, Marcel Siem, Graeme Storm
- United States

- Daly City, California: Steven Alker, Brian Campbell (a,L), Alex Čejka, Maverick McNealy (a,L), Kevin Sutherland
- Vero Beach, Florida: Daniel Berger, Andrés Echavarría (L), Nicholas Lindheim (L), Aron Price
- Roswell, Georgia: Smylie Kaufman (L), Henrik Norlander
- Rockville, Maryland: Chad Collins, Donald Constable (L), Billy Hurley III, Nick Mason (L)
- Purchase, New York: Matt Dobyns (L), Rob Oppenheim (L), Fran Quinn (L), Jim Renner
- Columbus, Ohio: Robert Allenby, Aaron Baddeley, Ryan Blaum, Paul Casey, Erik Compton, Ken Duke, Luke Guthrie, Kim Hyung-sung, Justin Leonard, Noh Seung-yul, Rod Pampling, Brett Stegmaier, Justin Thomas, Kevin Tway, Bo Van Pelt, Mark Wilson
- Springfield, Ohio: Will Grimmer (a,L), Brian Stuard, Chris Thompson (L)
- Creswell, Oregon: Zac Blair (L), Clayton Rask (L)
- Memphis, Tennessee: David Gossett, Cody Gribble (L), J. B. Holmes, Kevin Kisner, Jeff Maggert, Joe Ogilvie, Robby Shelton (a), Hunter Stewart (a,L), Hudson Swafford, David Toms, Brady Watt (L), Casey Wittenberg

- Jason Millard (L) was disqualified after reporting a self-imposed penalty during sectional qualifying.

- Houston, Texas: Anthony Broussard (L), Bobby Gates, Cory Whitsett (a)

Alternates who earned entry:

- Danny Willett (England) – replaced Tiger Woods
- Andrew Dorn (a,L, Springfield) – replaced Thomas Bjørn
- Scott Langley (Memphis) – replaced Richard Sterne
- Sam Love (L, Memphis) – replaced Jason Millard
- Craig Barlow (L, Daly City) – claimed spot held for category 14
- Brandon McIver (a,L, Cresswell) – claimed spot held for category 14
- Cameron Wilson (a, Purchase) – claimed spot held for category 14

(a) denotes amateur
(L) denotes player advanced through local qualifying

== Round summaries ==
=== First round ===
Thursday, June 12, 2014

Martin Kaymer led the field after shooting a five-under-par 65. He led a group of four golfers, including 2010 champion Graeme McDowell, by three strokes. Only 15 players shot under-par rounds. Defending champion Justin Rose shot 72. The scoring average for the field was 73.23, more than three strokes over par.

Place	Player	Score	To par
1	(Germany) Martin Kaymer	65	−5
T2	(Zimbabwe) Brendon de Jonge	68	−2
T2	(Northern Ireland) Graeme McDowell	68	−2
T2	(United States) Kevin Na	68	−2
T2	(United States) Fran Quinn	68	−2
T6	(United States) Keegan Bradley	69	−1
T6	(United States) Harris English	69	−1
T6	(United States) Dustin Johnson	69	−1
T6	(United States) Matt Kuchar	69	−1
T6	(Japan) Hideki Matsuyama	69	−1
T6	(Italy) Francesco Molinari	69	−1
T6	(United States) Brandt Snedeker	69	−1
T6	(United States) Jordan Spieth	69	−1
T6	(Sweden) Henrik Stenson	69	−1
T6	(United States) Brendon Todd	69	−1

=== Second round ===
Friday, June 13, 2014

Martin Kaymer recorded a second consecutive round of 65 (−5), establishing a new tournament record for lowest 36-hole score (130) and becoming the first player to open a major championship with two rounds of 65 or better. His six-stroke lead over Brendon Todd after 36 holes tied a tournament record previously set by Tiger Woods in 2000 and Rory McIlroy in 2011. 21 players shot under-par rounds and 13 players were under-par for the tournament. The cut was at 145 (+5) and 67 players made the cut including one amateur, 2013 U.S. Amateur winner Matt Fitzpatrick. The scoring average for the field was 72.89, just less than three strokes over par.

Place	Player	Score	To par
1	(Germany) Martin Kaymer	65-65=130	−10
2	(United States) Brendon Todd	69-67=136	−4
T3	(United States) Kevin Na	68-69=137	−3
T3	(United States) Brandt Snedeker	69-68=137	−3
T5	(United States) Keegan Bradley	69-69=138	−2
T5	(Zimbabwe) Brendon de Jonge	68-70=138	−2
T5	(United States) Dustin Johnson	69-69=138	−2
T5	(United States) Brooks Koepka	70-68=138	−2
T5	(Sweden) Henrik Stenson	69-69=138	−2
T10	(United States) Chris Kirk	71-68=139	−1
T10	(United States) Matt Kuchar	69-70=139	−1
T10	(Northern Ireland) Rory McIlroy	71-68=139	−1
T10	(United States) Jordan Spieth	69-70=139	−1

Amateurs: Fitzpatrick (+4), Campbell (+6), Stewart (+6), Whitsett (+6), Wilson (+8), McNealy (+10), Shelton (+13), Goss (+14), McIver (+15), Grimmer (+17), Dorn (+19)

=== Third round ===
Saturday, June 14, 2014

Kaymer dropped back towards the field, shooting a 2-over-par 72 but still led by five strokes on a tougher scoring day. Erik Compton and Rickie Fowler shot the only sub-par rounds, both shooting 67 (−3) to move into a tie for second place. Only six golfers remained under-par for the tournament. The scoring average for the field was 73.82, almost four strokes over par.

Place	Player	Score	To par
1	(Germany) Martin Kaymer	65-65-72=202	−8
T2	(United States) Erik Compton	72-68-67=207	−3
T2	(United States) Rickie Fowler	70-70-67=207	−3
T4	(United States) Dustin Johnson	69-69-70=208	−2
T4	(Sweden) Henrik Stenson	69-69-70=208	−2
6	(United States) Brandt Snedeker	69-68-72=209	−1
T7	(United States) Brooks Koepka	70-68-72=210	E
T7	(United States) Matt Kuchar	69-70-71=210	E
T7	(United States) Kevin Na	68-69-73=210	E
T10	(Zimbabwe) Brendon de Jonge	68-70-73=211	+1
T10	(United States) Chris Kirk	71-68-72=211	+1
T10	(England) Justin Rose	72-69-70=211	+1
T10	(United States) Jordan Spieth	69-70-72=211	+1

=== Final round ===
Sunday, June 15, 2014

Kaymer shot a 69 in the final round to win by eight strokes over Compton and Fowler. His 72-hole score of 271 was the second-lowest in U.S. Open history. This was his second major championship and also made him the fourth European winner of the event in five years (after Graeme McDowell, Rory McIlroy and Justin Rose) having previously had no European winners since Tony Jacklin in 1970. Eleven golfers shot under-par rounds but none in the last eight groups except Kaymer. Only three golfers finished under-par for the tournament. The scoring average for the field was 72.40, the lowest of any rounds.

==== Final leaderboard ====
Champion
Silver Cup winner (leading amateur)
(a) = amateur
(c) = past champion

Place	Player	Score	To par	Money ($)
1	(Germany) Martin Kaymer	65-65-72-69=271	−9	1,620,000
T2	(United States) Erik Compton	72-68-67-72=279	−1	789,330
T2	(United States) Rickie Fowler	70-70-67-72=279	−1	789,330
T4	(United States) Keegan Bradley	69-69-76-67=281	+1	326,310
T4	(Australia) Jason Day	73-68-72-68=281	+1	326,310
T4	(United States) Dustin Johnson	69-69-70-73=281	+1	326,310
T4	(United States) Brooks Koepka	70-68-72-71=281	+1	326,310
T4	(Sweden) Henrik Stenson	69-69-70-73=281	+1	326,310
T9	(Australia) Adam Scott	73-67-73-69=282	+2	211,715
T9	(United States) Brandt Snedeker	69-68-72-73=282	+2	211,715
T9	(United States) Jimmy Walker	70-72-71-69=282	+2	211,715

Leaderboard below the top 10
Place	Player	Score	To par	Money ($)
T12	(United States) Jim Furyk (c)	73-70-73-67=283	+3	156,679
T12	(United States) Matt Kuchar	69-70-71-73=283	+3	156,679
T12	(United States) Kevin Na	68-69-73-73=283	+3	156,679
T12	(England) Justin Rose (c)	72-69-70-72=283	+3	156,679
T12	(Germany) Marcel Siem	70-71-72-70=283	+3	156,679
T17	(United States) J. B. Holmes	70-71-72-71=284	+4	118,234
T17	(England) Ian Poulter	70-70-74-70=284	+4	118,234
T17	(United States) Jordan Spieth	69-70-72-73=284	+4	118,234
T17	(United States) Brendon Todd	69-67-79-69=284	+4	118,234
T21	(United States) Cody Gribble	72-72-72-69=285	+5	95,598
T21	(United States) Steve Stricker	70-71-73-71=285	+5	95,598
T23	(Australia) Aaron Baddeley	70-71-73-72=286	+6	79,968
T23	(United States) Billy Horschel	75-68-73-70=286	+6	79,968
T23	(India) Shiv Kapur	73-70-71-72=286	+6	79,968
T23	(Northern Ireland) Rory McIlroy (c)	71-68-74-73=286	+6	79,968
T23	(Italy) Francesco Molinari	69-71-72-74=286	+6	79,968
T28	(United States) Daniel Berger	72-71-78-66=287	+7	59,588
T28	(Zimbabwe) Brendon de Jonge	68-70-73-76=287	+7	59,588
T28	(France) Victor Dubuisson	70-72-70-75=287	+7	59,588
T28	(United States) Chris Kirk	71-68-72-76=287	+7	59,588
T28	(Northern Ireland) Graeme McDowell (c)	68-74-75-70=287	+7	59,588
T28	(United States) Phil Mickelson	70-73-72-72=287	+7	59,588
T28	(United States) Kenny Perry	74-69-74-70=287	+7	59,588
T35	(South Africa) Ernie Els (c)	74-70-72-72=288	+8	46,803
T35	(Spain) Sergio García	73-71-72-72=288	+8	46,803
T35	(United States) Bill Haas	72-72-71-73=288	+8	46,803
T35	(Japan) Hideki Matsuyama	69-71-74-74=288	+8	46,803
T35	(United States) Patrick Reed	71-72-73-72=288	+8	46,803
T40	(Denmark) Lucas Bjerregaard	70-72-72-75=289	+9	37,754
T40	(United States) Zac Blair	71-74-73-71=289	+9	37,754
T40	(United States) Zach Johnson	71-74-72-72=289	+9	37,754
T40	(South Africa) Garth Mulroy	71-72-70-76=289	+9	37,754
T40	(South Africa) Louis Oosthuizen	71-73-78-67=289	+9	37,754
T45	(South Africa) Retief Goosen (c)	73-71-71-75=290	+10	30,828
T45	(United States) Webb Simpson (c)	71-72-73-74=290	+10	30,828
T45	(England) Danny Willett	70-71-78-71=290	+10	30,828
T48	(United States) Harris English	69-75-75-72=291	+11	26,504
T48	(England) Matt Fitzpatrick (a)	71-73-78-69=291	+11	0
T48	(United States) Billy Hurley III	71-74-75-71=291	+11	26,504
T48	(United States) Ryan Moore	76-68-71-76=291	+11	26,504
T52	(South Korea) Noh Seung-yul	70-72-76-74=292	+12	24,514
T52	(United States) Gary Woodland	72-71-75-74=292	+12	24,514
T54	(United States) Stewart Cink	72-72-74-75=293	+13	23,535
T54	(United States) Scott Langley	72-71-75-75=293	+13	23,535
T56	(England) Paul Casey	70-75-74-75=294	+14	22,649
T56	(United States) Nicholas Lindheim	72-73-72-77=294	+14	22,649
T56	(United States) Fran Quinn	68-74-79-73=294	+14	22,649
59	(United States) Justin Leonard	75-70-75-75=295	+15	22,090
T60	(Germany) Alex Čejka	73-71-77-76=297	+17	21,564
T60	(United States) Russell Henley	70-74-82-71=297	+17	21,564
T60	(United States) Kevin Tway	72-72-81-72=297	+17	21,564
T63	(United States) Clayton Rask	73-71-77-77=298	+18	20,775
T63	(United States) Kevin Stadler	77-68-78-75=298	+18	20,775
T63	(United States) Bo Van Pelt	72-72-75-79=298	+18	20,775
66	(United States) Boo Weekley	71-73-80-75=299	+19	20,249
67	(Japan) Toru Taniguchi	72-73-88-76=309	+29	19,980
CUT	(Argentina) Ángel Cabrera (c)	74-72=146	+6	
CUT	(United States) Brian Campbell (a)	76-70=146	+6	
CUT	(United States) Matt Dobyns	74-72=146	+6	
CUT	(England) Luke Donald	77-69=146	+6	
CUT	(United States) Jason Dufner	72-74=146	+6	
CUT	(Colombia) Andrés Echavarría	74-72=146	+6	
CUT	(Thailand) Thongchai Jaidee	73-73=146	+6	
CUT	(Spain) Miguel Ángel Jiménez	72-74=146	+6	
CUT	(Australia) Matt Jones	74-72=146	+6	
CUT	(South Korea) Lee Kyoung-hoon	74-72=146	+6	
CUT	(Republic of Ireland) Shane Lowry	73-73=146	+6	
CUT	(Netherlands) Joost Luiten	70-76=146	+6	
CUT	(United States) Hunter Mahan	74-72=146	+6	
CUT	(Australia) Rod Pampling	73-73=146	+6	
CUT	(South Africa) Charl Schwartzel	70-76=146	+6	
CUT	(United States) Hunter Stewart (a)	75-71=146	+6	
CUT	(United States) Hudson Swafford	76-70=146	+6	
CUT	(United States) Bubba Watson	76-70=146	+6	
CUT	(United States) Cory Whitsett (a)	77-69=146	+6	
CUT	(United States) Mark Wilson	70-76=146	+6	
CUT	(United States) Casey Wittenberg	74-72=146	+6	
CUT	(United States) Ryan Blaum	73-74=147	+7	
CUT	(Northern Ireland) Darren Clarke	75-72=147	+7	
CUT	(Belgium) Nicolas Colsaerts	72-75=147	+7	
CUT	(Scotland) Chris Doak	74-73=147	+7	
CUT	(United States) Ken Duke	75-72=147	+7	
CUT	(United States) Luke Guthrie	73-74=147	+7	
CUT	(Scotland) Stephen Gallacher	73-74=147	+7	
CUT	(Australia) Geoff Ogilvy (c)	73-74=147	+7	
CUT	(Italy) Andrea Pavan	75-72=147	+7	
CUT	(United States) Jim Renner	74-73=147	+7	
CUT	(Australia) John Senden	71-76=147	+7	
CUT	(United States) David Toms	73-74=147	+7	
CUT	(United States) Roberto Castro	74-74=148	+8	
CUT	(United States) Chad Collins	74-74=148	+8	
CUT	(United States) Matt Every	76-72=148	+8	
CUT	(United States) Lucas Glover (c)	79-69=148	+8	
CUT	(United States) David Gossett	76-72=148	+8	
CUT	(China) Liang Wenchong	74-74=148	+8	
CUT	(United States) Sam Love	76-72=148	+8	
CUT	(United States) Ryan Palmer	74-74=148	+8	
CUT	(United States) Brian Stuard	75-73=148	+8	
CUT	(United States) Justin Thomas	75-73=148	+8	
CUT	(United States) Nick Watney	76-72=148	+8	
CUT	(England) Lee Westwood	75-73=148	+8	
CUT	(United States) Cameron Wilson (a)	78-70=148	+8	
CUT	(United States) Craig Barlow	74-75=149	+9	
CUT	(England) Oliver Fisher	74-75=149	+9	
CUT	(United States) Smylie Kaufman	73-76=149	+9	
CUT	(Spain) Pablo Larrazábal	71-78=149	+9	
CUT	(England) Tom Lewis	79-70=149	+9	
CUT	(Sweden) Henrik Norlander	70-79=149	+9	
CUT	(United States) Joe Ogilvie	73-76=149	+9	
CUT	(United States) Anthony Broussard	78-72=150	+10	
CUT	(Canada) Graham DeLaet	75-75=150	+10	
CUT	(Sweden) Niclas Fasth	76-74=150	+10	
CUT	(Germany) Maximilian Kieffer	76-74=150	+10	
CUT	(South Korea) Kim Hyung-sung	73-77=150	+10	
CUT	(United States) Maverick McNealy (a)	74-76=150	+10	
CUT	(United States) Kevin Sutherland	75-75=150	+10	
CUT	(Austria) Bernd Wiesberger	72-78=150	+10	
CUT	(Wales) Jamie Donaldson	70-81=151	+11	
CUT	(United States) David Oh	75-76=151	+11	
CUT	(United States) D. A. Points	77-74=151	+11	
CUT	(United States) Brett Stegmaier	77-74=151	+11	
CUT	(England) Graeme Storm	72-79=151	+11	
CUT	(Australia) Brady Watt	77-74=151	+11	
CUT	(South Korea) Yang Yong-eun	75-76=151	+11	
CUT	(New Zealand) Steven Alker	76-76=152	+12	
CUT	(Australia) Robert Allenby	79-73=152	+12	
CUT	(Spain) Gonzalo Fernández-Castaño	76-76=152	+12	
CUT	(England) Simon Griffiths	72-80=152	+12	
CUT	(United States) Kevin Kisner	75-77=152	+12	
CUT	(United States) Rob Oppenheim	75-77=152	+12	
CUT	(Australia) Aron Price	78-74=152	+12	
CUT	(United States) Kevin Streelman	75-77=152	+12	
CUT	(Sweden) Jonas Blixt	77-76=153	+13	
CUT	(United States) Jeff Maggert	73-80=153	+13	
CUT	(United States) Nick Mason	78-75=153	+13	
CUT	(United States) Robby Shelton (a)	78-75=153	+13	
CUT	(Australia) Oliver Goss (a)	71-83=154	+14	
CUT	(United States) Chris Thompson	80-74=154	+14	
CUT	(United States) Donald Constable	82-73=155	+15	
CUT	(United States) Bobby Gates	79-76=155	+15	
CUT	(United States) Brandon McIver (a)	82-73=155	+15	
CUT	(United States) Will Grimmer (a)	77-80=157	+17	
CUT	(United States) Andrew Dorn (a)	79-80=159	+19	
CUT	(Japan) Azuma Yano	77-83=160	+20	
CUT	(Japan) Kiyoshi Miyazato	81-81=162	+22	

==== Scorecard ====
Final round

Hole	1	2	3	4	5	6	7	8	9	10	11	12	13	14	15	16	17	18
Par	4	4	4	4	5	3	4	4	3	5	4	4	4	4	3	4	3	4
(Germany) Kaymer	−8	−8	−9	−9	−9	−9	−8	−8	−9	−8	−8	−8	−9	−10	−10	−9	−9	−9
(United States) Fowler	−3	−3	−3	−1	−2	−2	−2	−2	−1	−1	E	−1	−2	−2	−2	−2	−1	−1
(United States) Compton	−3	−3	−3	−3	−4	−4	−3	−4	−3	−4	−3	−2	−2	−2	−1	−1	−1	−1
(United States) Bradley	+4	+4	+3	+3	+3	+3	+4	+4	+3	+2	+2	+3	+1	+1	+1	+1	+1	+1
(Australia) Day	+3	+2	+2	+2	+2	+2	+2	+2	+2	+2	+2	+2	+1	+1	E	E	E	+1
(United States) Johnson	−2	−2	−2	−2	−2	−2	−2	−1	−1	−2	−2	−2	−2	−2	−1	E	+1	+1
(United States) Koepka	+1	+1	E	E	E	E	E	E	E	E	E	+1	+2	+2	+2	+2	+2	+1
(Sweden) Stenson	−2	−2	−3	−2	−2	−2	−2	−1	−1	−1	E	E	+1	+1	+1	+2	+1	+1

Cumulative tournament scores, relative to par

Eagle	Birdie	Bogey	Double bogey

== Media ==
This was the last U.S. Open for NBC Sports, which had televised the event for twenty consecutive years, 1995–2014. Starting in 2015, Fox Sports began a 12-year contract to televise the championship and other USGA events, which it ended early before the 2020 U.S. Open, where NBC regained coverage due to scheduling conflicts with Fox's NFL and college football coverage caused by the tournament's postponement due to the COVID-19 pandemic.
