= Blake Adams =

American professional golfer (born 1975)

Personal information
- Nationality: United States
- Born: August 27, 1975 (age 51) Bartlesville, Oklahoma, U.S.
- Height: 6 ft 3 in (1.91 m)
- Weight: 205 lb (93 kg; 14.6 st)

Career
- Sport: Golf
- College: University of Georgia; Georgia Southern University
- Turned professional: 2001
- Former tours: PGA Tour; Web.com Tour; NGA Hooters Tour; Gateway Tour; Tarheel Tour
- Professional wins: 3

Best results in major championships
- Masters Tournament: DNP
- PGA Championship: T7: 2012
- U.S. Open: T21: 2012
- The Open Championship: DNP

Blake Adams (born August 27, 1975) is an American professional golfer who has played on the PGA Tour.

== Early life and career ==
Adams was born in Bartlesville, Oklahoma, but only lived there for two months. His family moved to Dalton, Georgia, where he lived until he was sixteen years old. After his mother remarried, he moved to Eatonton and graduated from Gatewood School, and enrolled at the University of Georgia in Athens.

Adams spent three years at Georgia then transferred to Georgia Southern University in Statesboro. He earned a bachelor's degree in sociology in 2001 and turned professional later that year.

== Professional career ==
=== 2007–2009: Nationwide Tour ===
Injuries have plagued Adams throughout his career and he bounced around on the mini-tours until he joined the Nationwide Tour in 2007. In his first full season in 2007, Adams made only 5 of 16 cuts and earned just $23,270.

In 2008, he made 7 of 11 cuts, playing a limited schedule. He had one top 10, earned $63,701, and obtained his full-time Nationwide Tour card for 2009.

Adams had a breakout year in 2009, with seven top-10s between May and August, including a career high finish of solo second place in Canada at the Ford Wayne Gretzky Classic. In September, he led the Boise Open by four shots after three rounds, but finished again in solo second by a stroke, earning $78,500. Adams earned $399,749 in 2009 and finished third on the Nationwide money list. He shattered the Nationwide Tour's record for single season earnings without a victory; his successful 2009 season secured him a promotion to the PGA Tour for the 2010 season.

=== 2010–present: PGA Tour ===
After a top-10 finish in February at the AT&T Pebble Beach National Pro-Am, Adams' first notable success came at the HP Byron Nelson Championship in Texas in May 2010; he finished in a three-way tie for second by two strokes, albeit following a disappointing double bogey on the 72nd hole. This result earned him $485,333 and put his winnings over $820,000 for the season, which moved him from 118th to 47th on the 2010 money list, and secured his PGA Tour playing privileges for 2011.

Adams, along with a few other PGA Tour hopefuls, was featured on an NBC special "Ticket to the Tour", which aired on January 2. Adams hosted the weekly "Inside the PGA Tour" on January 12 and was featured in the March 2010 issue of Men's Journal magazine.

== Personal life ==
Adams lives in Swainsboro, Georgia with his wife and two children.

== Professional wins (3) ==
=== NGA Hooters Tour wins (1) ===
No.	Date	Tournament	Winning score	Margin of victory	Runner-up
1	Sep 4, 2005	Langdale Ford Championship	−10 (72-68-70-68=278)	2 strokes	(United States) Matt Hendrix

=== Gateway Tour wins (1) ===
No.	Date	Tournament	Winning score	Margin of victory	Runner-up
1	Apr 22, 2005	Silver Lakes	−9 (70-65-71-73=279)	1 stroke	(England) Gary Christian

=== Tarheel Tour wins (1) ===
No.	Date	Tournament	Winning score	Margin of victory	Runners-up
1	Oct 2, 2008	Columbia Open	−16 (67-68-65=200)	1 stroke	(United States) Cory Kaufman, (United States) Scott Usher

== Results in major championships ==
Tournament	2012
Masters Tournament	
U.S. Open	T21
The Open Championship	
PGA Championship	T7

Top 10
Did not play

CUT = missed the half-way cut
"T" indicates a tie for a place

=== Summary ===
Tournament	Wins	2nd	3rd	Top-5	Top-10	Top-25	Events	Cuts made
Masters Tournament	0	0	0	0	0	0	0	0
U.S. Open	0	0	0	0	0	1	1	1
The Open Championship	0	0	0	0	0	0	0	0
PGA Championship	0	0	0	0	1	1	1	1
Totals	0	0	0	0	1	2	2	2

- Most consecutive cuts made – 2 (2012 U.S. Open – present)
- Longest streak of top-10s – 1

== See also ==
- 2009 Nationwide Tour graduates
