= Tadd Fujikawa =

American professional golfer (born 1991)

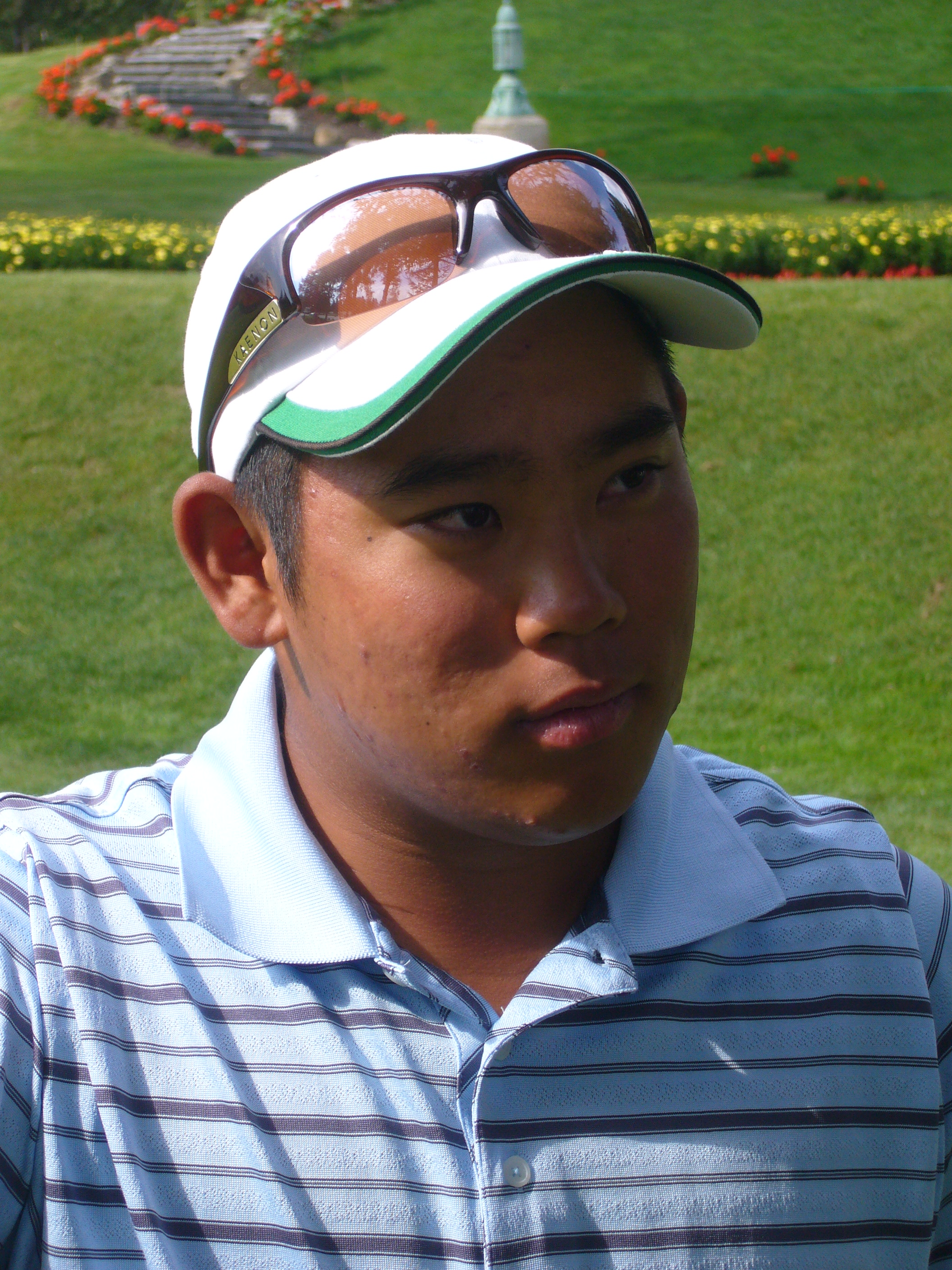

Personal information
- Full name: Tadd Fujikawa
- Nationality: United States
- Born: January 8, 1991 (age 35) Honolulu, Hawaii, U.S.
- Height: 5 ft 1 in (1.55 m)
- Weight: 150 lb (68 kg; 11 st)

Career
- Sport: Golf
- College: None
- Turned professional: 2007
- Former tours: PGA Tour Canada eGolf Professional Tour; Hooters Tour
- Professional wins: 6

Best results in major championships
- Masters Tournament: DNP
- PGA Championship: DNP
- U.S. Open: CUT: 2006
- The Open Championship: DNP

Tadd Fujikawa (born January 8, 1991) is an American professional golfer. Playing as an amateur at age 15, he qualified for the 2006 U.S. Open, the youngest golfer ever to do so. In 2007, at age 16 and 4 days, he made the cut in a PGA Tour event at the Sony Open in Hawaii, the second youngest player to ever achieve that feat. As of April 2013, he is the third youngest. In September 2018, Fujikawa came out as gay, becoming the first male professional golfer to do so.

== Early life ==
Fujikawa was born in Honolulu, Hawaii. He was born three months premature and doctors gave him a 50-50 chance of survival. He weighed 1 pound, 15 ounces and was so small that he could fit in his grandfather's palm. His parents worried that he would grow up with a mental disability. Partially as a result of his premature birth, at age 18 Fujikawa stood 5 feet 1 inch (1.55 m) tall. As of March 2007 he stated his weight was 150 pounds.

== Amateur career ==
In 2006 aged 15, Fujikawa qualified for the U.S. Open at Winged Foot by winning the Hawaii sectional qualifier(67-69-136), becoming the youngest player in history to qualify for the tournament. At the U.S. Open, Fujikawa shot 81-77(158) and missed the cut by nine strokes.

Fujikawa made his second PGA Tour start (2006 U.S. Open was the first) at the 2007 Sony Open in Hawaii, having gained entry by shooting 67 in the Open Qualifier PGA Tour Exemption Category #17. In the second round of the Sony Open itself, Fujikawa became the youngest player in nearly 50 years to make a PGA Tour cut. A birdie on the 16th hole put him within the cut line, but it was his 15-foot eagle on the 18th hole that was his most memorable shot of the day. With that shot, Fujikawa secured a 4-under-par 66 and made the cut by three shots.

Fujikawa followed up his history-making cut by shooting a second straight 66 in the third round, a score which, on that day, was bettered only by tournament leader Charles Howell III. Fujikawa made a 51-foot birdie on the 11th hole, finishing the third round tied for eighth place, along with Chad Campell and Tom Pernice Jr.

Fujikawa shot 2-over-72 in Sunday's final round, which only included 2 birdies. He finished the tournament tied for 20th place at 5-under-275.

One month after his record-breaking showing at the Sony Open in Hawaii, Fujikawa won the Hawaii Pearl Open, Hawaii's most lucrative local golf tournament, held annually since 1979. Fujikawa was the first amateur since 1992 to win the tournament.

== Professional career ==
=== 2007 ===
On July 12, 2007, Fujikawa announced that he would be turning pro. He made his debut at the Reno-Tahoe Open where he missed the cut.

After missing the cut in each of his first three events as a professional, Fujikawa recorded a hole in one on the 17th hole in the first round of this Nationwide Tour event. He went on to shoot 70 and 71 in the first two rounds and missed the cut again, this time by 3 strokes.

In September 2007, he hit an albatross at the Omega European Masters in Switzerland on the European Tour. It was not enough to make the cut though. He also missed the cut at the Children's Miracle Network Classic which was the last official 2007 PGA Tour event.

=== 2008 ===
On April 20, 2008, Fujikawa made his first cut as a professional and earned his first professional victory by winning the 50th annual Mid-Pacific Open in Hawaii. The Mid-Pacific Open is tournament run by the Mid-Pacific Country Club in Hawaii, with a mixed field of amateurs and professionals, mostly from Hawaii. Fujikawa's final score for the tournament was ten under-par 278. The second-place finisher was former PGA Tour tournament winner, 52-year-old David Ishii. At age 17, Fujikawa became the youngest winner in tournament history. The tournament is not affiliated with any organized golf tour and is played mostly by Hawaiian amateurs and professionals, both adults and juniors. Punahou High School seniors Stephanie Kono and Anna Jang also made history at the tournament as the first females to play and Kono was the first female to make a cut. Kono finished 33rd.

=== 2009 ===
In January 2009, Fujikawa Monday qualified for the Sony Open in Hawaii. He made the cut for the second time in three years, carding 71–69 to make the cut by one shot in blustery conditions. In the third round, he shot an 8-under 62, tying the course record, and moving him to within two shots of the leader. In the fourth round, he shot 73 and finished in a tie for 32nd place. On April 19, 2009, Fujikawa successfully defended his title and earned his second professional win at the 51st annual Mid-Pacific Open. Fujikawa's final score was twelve under par 276. Fujikawa won by nine shots over former PGA Tour tournament winner, David Ishii. In the first week of June, Fujikawa won another local event in Hawaii, the two-round Maui Open. In October, he went to PGA Tour Qualifying School in an attempt to earn his PGA Tour card for 2010. He failed to advance beyond the first stage of the three-stage process, missing the necessary score by six shots.

=== 2010 ===
In January 2010, Fujikawa missed the cut by six strokes in the Sony Open on the PGA Tour. Shortly after he joined the eGolf Professional Tour, formerly known as the Tarheel Tour, a developmental golf tour based in Charlotte, North Carolina. Fujikawa played in four events in February and March, making the cut in all four, before withdrawing from an event in April, citing a back injury. Two days later he said he felt fine saying, "I just slept kinda funny I guess." He accepted an invitation to play in The Crowns on the Japan Golf Tour two weeks later. At The Crowns, he missed the cut by nine strokes. In December, he won the Hawaii State Open.

=== 2016 ===
Fujikawa qualified for PGA Tour Canada in 2016.

=== 2017 ===
Fujikawa won the Hawaii State Open for a second time.

== Education and personal life ==
Fujikawa graduated from Moanalua High School in Honolulu, Hawaii in June 2009. Earlier that year, his father Derrick had pleaded guilty to two counts of drug trafficking; in August he was sentenced to ten years in prison with eligibility for parole after one year.

On September 12, 2018, Fujikawa came out as gay during a post on Instagram, becoming the first male professional golfer to publicly come out as gay.

== Professional wins (1) ==
=== eGolf Professional Tour wins (1) ===
No.	Date	Tournament	Winning score	Margin of victory	Runner-up
1	Aug 7, 2010	eGolf Tour Championship	−25 (65-64-66-68=263)	9 strokes	(United States) Matt Hendrix

== Results in major championships ==
Tournament	2006
U.S. Open	CUT

CUT = missed the half-way cut
Note: Fujikawa only played in the U.S. Open.

== Youngest ever to make the cut in a PGA Tour event ==
Player	Age	Tournament	Finish
Guan Tianlang	14 years, 5 months, 18 days	2013 Masters Tournament	58
Bob Panasik	15 years, 8 months, 20 days	1957 Canadian Open	T66
Tadd Fujikawa	16 years, 4 days	2007 Sony Open in Hawaii	T20
Justin Thomas	16 years, 2 months, 23 days	2009 Wyndham Championship	T78
Matteo Manassero	16 years, 2 months, 29 days	2009 British Open	T13
Ty Tryon	16 years, 9 months, 7 days	2001 Honda Classic	T39
Jordan Spieth	16 years, 9 months, 24 days	2010 HP Byron Nelson Championship	T16

Sources.
