= Scott Brown (golfer) =

American professional golfer (born 1983)

Personal information
- Full name: Samuel Scott Brown
- Nationality: United States
- Born: May 22, 1983 (age 43) Augusta, Georgia, U.S.
- Height: 5 ft 8 in (1.73 m)
- Weight: 170 lb (77 kg; 12 st)

Career
- Sport: Golf
- College: University of South Carolina Aiken
- Turned professional: 2006
- Current tours: PGA Tour (past champion status)
- Former tours: Nationwide Tour eGolf Professional Tour
- Professional wins: 6

Number of wins by tour
- PGA Tour: 1
- Other: 5

Best results in major championships
- Masters Tournament: DNP
- PGA Championship: T13: 2017
- U.S. Open: DNP
- The Open Championship: CUT: 2013

Achievements and awards
- eGolf Professional Tour money list winner: 2009

Samuel Scott Brown (born May 22, 1983) is an American professional golfer who plays on the PGA Tour.

== Amateur career ==
Brown attended the University of South Carolina Aiken, playing collegiate golf for the Pacers at the Division II-level.

== Professional career ==
In 2006, Brown turned professional. He began playing mini-tours. Brown played on the NGA Hooters Tour from 2007 to 2009 and finished on top of the eGolf Professional Tour money list in 2009, with three wins.

In 2010 and 2011, he played on the Nationwide Tour, recording five top-three finishes in 2011 to finish eighth on the money list and earn a PGA Tour card for 2012. Brown missed his first six PGA Tour cuts before finished tied for fifth at the 2012 Puerto Rico Open. Brown had two fifth-place finishes in 2012, but could only manage to place 148th on the PGA Tour money list, barely maintaining conditional status by $4,468.

Brown started the 2013 season dividing his time between the PGA Tour and Web.com Tour. Brown regained his PGA Tour card through 2015 with a win at the 2013 Puerto Rico Open. He qualified for the 2013 Open Championship and, as a tour winner, the 2013 PGA Championship.

== Personal life ==
Brown's grandparents, Herman and Elizabeth Thacker, live on a property adjacent to Augusta National Golf Club. The club, seeking to expand its grounds, has made several offers to the family for the property and have been declined, though the Thackers did sell property they owned across the street to the club for $1.2 million. Brown has never played in The Masters.

== Professional wins (6) ==
=== PGA Tour wins (1) ===
No.	Date	Tournament	Winning score	Margin of victory	Runners-up
1	Mar 10, 2013	Puerto Rico Open	−20 (68-63-67-70=268)	1 stroke	(Argentina) Fabián Gómez, (United States) Jordan Spieth

PGA Tour playoff record (0–1)

No.	Year	Tournament	Opponents	Result
1	2017	Zurich Classic of New Orleans (with (United States) Kevin Kisner)	(Sweden) Jonas Blixt and (Australia) Cameron Smith	Lost to birdie on fourth extra hole

=== eGolf Professional Tour wins (5) ===
No.	Date	Tournament	Winning score	Margin of victory	Runner(s)-up
1	Jun 14, 2007	Bermuda Run Open	−15 (67-65-67=199)	1 stroke	(United States) Andy Bare
2	Nov 9, 2007	Match Play Bonus Championship	2 and 1		(United States) Jason Martin
3	Apr 10, 2009	Bushnell Championship	−8 (68-70-70=208)	1 stroke	(United States) Ryan Carter
4	Jul 24, 2009	Forest Oaks Classic	−16 (65-64-71=200)	1 stroke	(United States) Matt Hendrix, (United States) Brad Klapprott, (United States) Chip Lynn
5	Sep 25, 2009	Cabarrus Classic	−19 (67-63-65=195)	2 strokes	(Brazil) Fernando Mechereffe

== Results in major championships ==
Tournament	2013	2014	2015	2016	2017	2018
Masters Tournament						
U.S. Open						
The Open Championship	CUT					
PGA Championship	CUT	T46			T13	80

Did not play

CUT = missed the half-way cut
"T" indicates a tie for a place

== Results in The Players Championship ==
Tournament	2013	2014	2015	2016	2017	2018	2019	2020	2021
The Players Championship	CUT	T62	T30	CUT	CUT	T23	CUT	C	T61

CUT = missed the halfway cut
"T" indicates a tie for a place
C = Canceled after the first round due to the COVID-19 pandemic

== See also ==
- 2011 Nationwide Tour graduates
