= Jesse Hutchins =

American professional golfer (born 1981)

Personal information
- Full name: Jesse J. Hutchins
- Nationality: United States
- Born: August 16, 1981 (age 45) Columbus, Ohio, U.S.
- Height: 6 ft 1 in (185 cm)
- Weight: 185 lb (84 kg)

Career
- Sport: Golf
- College: Wright State University
- Turned professional: 2004
- Former tours: Web.com Tour; NGA Hooters Tour eGolf Professional Tour
- Professional wins: 2

Best results in major championships
- Masters Tournament: DNP
- PGA Championship: DNP
- U.S. Open: CUT: 2011
- The Open Championship: DNP

Jesse J. Hutchins (born August 16, 1981) is an American professional golfer.

== Career ==
Hutchins played on the Swing Thought Tour and Web.com Tour. He played in the 2011 U.S. Open.

== Professional wins (2) ==
=== NGA Hooters Tour wins (1) ===
| No. | Date | Tournament | Winning score | Margin of victory | Runner-up |
|---|---|---|---|---|---|
| 1 | Feb 18, 2011 | Members Only Shootout | −23 (65-67-61=193) | 4 strokes | (Canada) Stuart Anderson |

=== eGolf Professional Tour wins (1) ===
| No. | Date | Tournament | Winning score | Margin of victory | Runner-up |
|---|---|---|---|---|---|
| 1 | Jul 20, 2013 | HGM Hotels Classic | −15 (72-66-68-67=273) | 1 stroke | (United States) Garland Green |

== Results in major championships ==
| Tournament | 2011 |
|---|---|
| U.S. Open | CUT |

CUT = missed the halfway cut
Note: Hutchins only played in the U.S. Open.
