= Max Harris (golfer) =

English professional golfer

Personal information
- Nationality: England
- Born: 29 April 1978 (age 48) Worthing, West Sussex, England

Career
- Sport: Golf
- College: University of North Carolina
- Turned professional: 2000
- Former tours: PGA EuroPro Tour; Tarheel Tour
- Professional wins: 2

Max Harris (born 29 April 1978) is an English professional golfer.

Harris attended the University of North Carolina on a golf scholarship before turning professional in 2000. In 2001 he played two tournaments on the Nationwide Tour, finishing tied for 12th in the Buy.com Richmond Open and missing the cut at the Buy.com Steamtown Classic. He has since returned to England, where he has worked as a club professional and competed on the third tier PGA EuroPro Tour.

== Professional wins (2) ==
=== Tarheel Tour wins (2) ===
| No. | Date | Tournament | Winning score | Margin of victory | Runner(s)-up |
|---|---|---|---|---|---|
| 1 | 26 Jul 2002 | Warrior Invitational | −15 (65-66-67=198) | 3 strokes | (United States) Kevin Angle |
| 2 | 5 Sep 2002 | Stonebridge Open | −13 (67-68-68=203) | Playoff | (United States) Matt Cannon, (United States) Karl Mitchell |

== Team appearances ==
Amateur

- European Boys' Team Championship (representing England): 1994 (winners)
- Palmer Cup (representing Great Britain & Ireland): 1998 (tie), 1999, 2000 (winners)
- St Andrews Trophy (representing Great Britain & Ireland): 2000 (winners)
