= Will MacKenzie =

American professional golfer (born 1974)

Personal information
- Full name: William Ruggles MacKenzie
- Nationality: United States
- Born: September 28, 1974 (age 52) Greenville, North Carolina, U.S.
- Height: 5 ft 11 in (1.80 m)
- Weight: 170 lb (77 kg; 12 st)
- Spouse: Alli Spencer (m. 2007; div. 2014)
- Children: 2

Career
- Sport: Golf
- College: Lees-McRae College
- Turned professional: 2000
- Current tour: PGA Tour
- Former tours: Web.com Tour; Canadian Tour; NGA Hooters Tour; Golden Bear Tour
- Professional wins: 6
- Highest ranking: 84 (March 30, 2014)

Number of wins by tour
- PGA Tour: 2
- Other: 4

Best results in major championships
- Masters Tournament: DNP
- PGA Championship: T57: 2007
- U.S. Open: DNP
- The Open Championship: DNP

William Ruggles MacKenzie (born September 28, 1974) is an American professional golfer who has played on the PGA Tour.

== Early life ==
MacKenzie was born and raised in Greenville, North Carolina.

After a semester at Lees-McRae College, Will took the money he earned washing dishes and selling grilled-cheese sandwiches at Grateful Dead concerts and moved out west. After a while working for Taco Bell in Jackson Hole, Wyoming, he spent the next five winters snowboarding while living out of a van in Big Sky, Montana. At one point, he spent 30 days living in a snow cave near Valdez, Alaska without showering, and snowboarding the Chugach Mountains, before ending up with frostbite.

During the warmer months, he climbed rocks, and became a class V kayaker before working as a rafting guide in Montana and its Gallatin River, West Virginia and its Gauley River, and rivers around North Carolina. He returned to Greenville, North Carolina in 1999, making enough money selling Christmas trees to embark on a three-month surfing trip to Costa Rica. Unfortunately, when he returned home and tried to make a living selling hammocks, he ended up in huge debt.

== Professional career ==
MacKenzie observed his boyhood idol, Payne Stewart, winning the 1999 U.S. Open which rekindled his love affair with the game of golf. MacKenzie decided to play professionally and turned pro in 2000.

MacKenzie played on several mini-tours shortly after turning pro. He played on the Golden Bear Tour in 2003 and finished ninth on the money list. The next year (2004), he played the Hooters Tour and finished third on the money list with three wins. He also played on the Nationwide and Canadian Tours.

2005 was his rookie season on the PGA Tour. His first win came in 2006 at the Reno-Tahoe Open in his 47th career start on the PGA Tour. He won the 2008 Viking Classic in a three-way playoff on the second hole over Marc Turnesa and Brian Gay.

In 2013, MacKenzie played the entire season on the Web.com Tour, finished 40th on the money list, and regained his PGA Tour privileges through the Web.com Tour Finals. In the 2014 PGA Tour, he finished second at the Valero Texas Open and fourth at the Valspar Championship.

== Personal life ==
MacKenzie currently resides in Jupiter, Florida.

== Professional wins (6) ==
=== PGA Tour wins (2) ===
No.	Date	Tournament	Winning score	Margin of victory	Runner(s)-up
1	Aug 27, 2006	Reno–Tahoe Open	−20 (63-67-67-71=268)	1 stroke	(United States) Bob Estes
2	Sep 21, 2008	Viking Classic	−19 (70-64-67-68=269)	Playoff	(United States) Brian Gay, (United States) Marc Turnesa

PGA Tour playoff record (1–1)

No.	Year	Tournament	Opponents	Result
1	2008	Viking Classic	(United States) Brian Gay, (United States) Marc Turnesa	Won with birdie on second extra hole Gay eliminated by birdie on first hole
2	2014	McGladrey Classic	(Zimbabwe) Brendon de Jonge, (United States) Robert Streb	Streb won with birdie on second extra hole MacKenzie eliminated by par on first hole

=== NGA Hooters Tour wins (3) ===
No.	Date	Tournament	Winning score	Margin of victory	Runner(s)-up
1	Jun 13, 2004	Touchstone Energy Open	−12 (73-65-72-66=276)	1 stroke	(United States) Mike Austin, (United States) Chad Collins
2	Aug 15, 2004	Buffalo Run Casino Classic	−21 (69-68-65-65=267)	3 strokes	(United States) Tee McCabe
3	Sep 12, 2004	Dothan Classic	−13 (71-72-70-62=275)	3 strokes	(United States) Nick Gilliam

=== Golden Bear Tour wins (1) ===
No.	Date	Tournament	Winning score	Margin of victory	Runner-up
1	Jul 24, 2003	Canon USA Classic	−16 (65-68-67=200)	Playoff	(United States) Ken Macdonald

== Playoff record ==
Web.com Tour playoff record (0–1)

No.	Year	Tournament	Opponent	Result
1	2013	Chiquita Classic	(United States) Andrew Svoboda	Lost to par on first extra hole

== Results in major championships ==
Tournament	2007	2008	2009	2010	2011	2012	2013	2014
Masters Tournament								
U.S. Open								
The Open Championship								
PGA Championship	T57		CUT					CUT

Did not play

CUT = missed the half-way cut
"T" = tied

== See also ==
- 2004 PGA Tour Qualifying School graduates
- 2005 PGA Tour Qualifying School graduates
- 2013 Web.com Tour Finals graduates
- 2016 Web.com Tour Finals graduates
