= Marc Turnesa =

American professional golfer (born 1978)

Personal information
- Nationality: United States
- Born: March 19, 1978 (age 48) Rockville Centre, New York, U.S.
- Height: 6 ft 0 in (1.83 m)
- Weight: 220 lb (100 kg; 16 st)
- Life partners: Katherine Bostic Turnesa, divorced

Career
- Sport: Golf
- College: North Carolina State University
- Turned professional: 2002
- Current tours: PGA Tour (past champion status); Web.com Tour
- Professional wins: 2

Number of wins by tour
- PGA Tour: 1
- Korn Ferry Tour: 1

Best results in major championships
- Masters Tournament: DNP
- PGA Championship: CUT: 2009
- U.S. Open: CUT: 2011
- The Open Championship: DNP

Marc Turnesa (born March 19, 1978) is an American professional golfer who has played on the Nationwide Tour and the PGA Tour.

== Early life ==
Turnesa is the grandson of Mike Turnesa, one of seven well-known golfing brothers of the early 20th century.

== Professional career ==
Turnesa's first professional win was at the 2007 Miccosukee Championship on the Nationwide Tour. He earned his PGA Tour card by finishing in the top-25 of the 2007 Nationwide Tour money list. Turnesa had success in the 2008 PGA Tour Fall Series at the Viking Classic; he led the tournament for the entire week until he double-bogeyed the seventeenth hole on Sunday, eventually losing in a playoff to Will MacKenzie. A month later, Turnesa captured his first PGA Tour win at the Justin Timberlake Shriners Hospitals for Children Open by one stroke over Matt Kuchar. This victory secured his tour card for the 2009 and 2010 seasons. A back injury plagued Turnesa after the 2010 season and he spent most of his subsequent career on the Web.com Tour.

== Professional wins (2) ==
=== PGA Tour wins (1) ===
No.	Date	Tournament	Winning score	Margin of victory	Runner-up
1	Oct 19, 2008	Justin Timberlake Shriners Hospitals for Children Open	−25 (62-64-69-68=263)	1 stroke	(United States) Matt Kuchar

PGA Tour playoff record (0–1)

No.	Year	Tournament	Opponents	Result
1	2008	Viking Classic	(United States) Brian Gay, (United States) Will MacKenzie	MacKenzie won with birdie on second extra hole Gay eliminated by birdie on first hole

=== Nationwide Tour wins (1) ===
No.	Date	Tournament	Winning score	Margin of victory	Runners-up
1	Oct 28, 2007	Miccosukee Championship	−15 (67-63-69-70=269)	1 stroke	(United States) David Mathis, (Canada) Jon Mills

== Results in major championships ==
Tournament	2009	2010	2011
U.S. Open			CUT
PGA Championship	CUT		

Did not play

CUT = missed the half-way cut
"T" = tied
Note: Turnesa never played in the Masters Tournament or The Open Championship.

== Results in The Players Championship ==
Tournament	2009
The Players Championship	CUT

CUT = missed the halfway cut

== Results in World Golf Championships ==
Tournament	2009
Match Play	
Championship	
Invitational	T74
Champions	

Did not play

"T" = Tied
