= Séamus Power (golfer) =

Irish professional golfer

Personal information
- Full name: Séamus Edmond Power
- Nationality: Ireland
- Born: 4 March 1987 (age 39) Tooraneena, County Waterford, Ireland
- Height: 6 ft 3 in (1.91 m)
- Weight: 200 lb (91 kg; 14 st)

Career
- Sport: Golf
- College: East Tennessee State University
- Turned professional: 2011
- Current tours: PGA Tour; European Tour
- Former tours: Web.com Tour eGolf Professional Tour
- Professional wins: 7
- Highest ranking: 28 (20 November 2022) (as of 25 October 2026)

Number of wins by tour
- PGA Tour: 2
- Korn Ferry Tour: 1
- Other: 4

Best results in major championships
- Masters Tournament: T27: 2022
- PGA Championship: T9: 2022
- U.S. Open: T12: 2022
- The Open Championship: CUT: 2022, 2023

Séamus Edmond Power (born 4 March 1987) is an Irish professional golfer who plays on the PGA Tour, where he achieved a career-high ranking of World No.28. A two-time PGA Tour winner, his notable achievements include winning the 2021 Barbasol Championship and the 2022 Butterfield Bermuda Championship.

== Early life and amateur career ==
Power was born in Waterford, Ireland, and has two elder brothers: twins Jack and Willie. His mother Philomena died when he was eight years old, leaving his father Ned, a small farmer from Tooraneena, to provide for the family. He was an ambidextrous hurler during his youth, and started playing golf at West Waterford Golf Club when he was 12. Ned later took on a second job as a welder at Boston Scientific to allow Power to travel to junior golf tournaments across Ireland.

Following a decorated junior amateur career that included three consecutive Irish Youths Championship victorire, Power was recruited to play college golf at East Tennessee State University (ETSU). He received his scholarship offer after fellow Irish golfer Rory Mcllroy, who had initially signed a letter of intent with the university, vacated the spot to turn professional instead. Power won five individual collegiate titles for the Buccaneers, including the Atlantic Sun Conference Championship in 2007 and 2010. He graduated from ETSU in 2011 with a first-class honors degree in accounting.

== Professional career ==
After graduating from ETSU, Power played on various mini-tours while attempting to qualify for the Web.com Tour. He won two events on the eGolf Professional Tour in 2014 and earned his Web.com Tour card for 2015 through qualifying school.

He recorded two top-10 finishes on the Web.com Tour in 2015 and finished 72nd on the money list, re-earning his playing a card for 2016. In May 2016, he won the United Leasing & Finance Championship, becoming the first Irish player to win on the Web.com Tour. Later that summer, following the high-profile withdrawals of Rory Mcllroy and Shane Lowry over Zika virus concerns, Power represented Ireland at the 2016 Olympic tournament in Rio de Janeiro, performing strongly to finish tied for 15th place.

In July 2021, Power won his first PGA Tour event at the Barbasol Championship, defeating J.T. Poston on the sixth extra hole of a sudden-death playoff. The victory made him just the third contemporary golfer from Republic of Ireland to win a modern-era PGA Tour titles, joning Pádraig Harrington and Shane Lowry. Power broke into the top 50 of the Official World Golf Ranking for the first time in his career on 17 January 2022, following a third-place finish at the Sony Open in Hawaii.

He enjoyed a career-best run in Major championship during the 2022 season. In March, he earned his maiden Masters Tournament appearance after reaching the quarter-finals at the 2022 WGC-Dell Technologies Match Play. He then recorded his first career top-10 finish in a Major by tying for 9th place at the 2022 PGA Championship, before following it up with a tied-12th finsish at the 2022 U.S. Open.

In October 2022, Power won his second PGA Tour event at the Butterfield Bermuda Championship, carding three rounds of 65 en route to a one-stroke victory over Thomas Detry. In January 2023, he made his international team play debut representing Great Britain and Ireland in the inaugural Hero Cup. Prior to the 2023 Masters Tournament, Power became just the third individual in tournament history to record back-to-back holes-in-one during the traditional Par 3 Contest.

== Professional wins (7) ==
=== PGA Tour wins (2) ===
No.	Date	Tournament	Winning score	Margin of victory	Runner-up
1	18 Jul 2021	Barbasol Championship	−21 (65-68-67-67=267)	Playoff	(United States) J. T. Poston
2	30 Oct 2022	Butterfield Bermuda Championship	−19 (65-65-65-70=265)	1 stroke	(Belgium) Thomas Detry

PGA Tour playoff record (1–1)

No.	Year	Tournament	Opponent	Result
1	2021	Barbasol Championship	(United States) J. T. Poston	Won with par on sixth extra hole
2	2026	Butterfield Bermuda Championship	(United States) Austin Smotherman	Lost to par on third extra hole

=== Web.com Tour wins (1) ===
No.	Date	Tournament	Winning score	Margin of victory	Runners-up
1	1 May 2016	United Leasing & Finance Championship	−12 (69-70-70-67=276)	1 stroke	(United States) Cody Gribble, (United States) Jonathan Randolph, (United States) Adam Schenk

=== eGolf Professional Tour wins (4) ===
No.	Date	Tournament	Winning score	Margin of victory	Runner-up
1	30 Mar 2012	River Run Classic	−16 (64-66-70=200)	2 strokes	(Canada) Cam Burke
2	22 Jun 2012	Spring Creek Classic	−16 (67-64-66=197)	5 strokes	(United States) Drew Weaver
3	28 Mar 2014	Cowans Ford Open	−10 (70-67-69=206)	4 strokes	(United States) David Sanchez
4	12 Jul 2014	Southern Open	−21 (67-65-66-65=263)	1 stroke	(French Polynesia) Vaita Guillaume

== Results in major championships ==
Tournament	2022	2023	2024	2025
Masters Tournament	T27	T46		
PGA Championship	T9	CUT		CUT
U.S. Open	T12	CUT	CUT	
The Open Championship	CUT	CUT		

Top 10
Did not play

CUT = missed the half-way cut
"T" = tied

== Results in The Players Championship ==
Tournament	2019	2020	2021	2022	2023	2024	2025	2026
The Players Championship	T35	C		T33	CUT	T64	CUT	T70

Did not play

"T" indicates a tie for a place
CUT = missed the halfway cut
C = cancelled after the first round due to the COVID-19 pandemic

== Results in World Golf Championships ==
Tournament	2022	2023
Match Play	QF	T31
Champions	NT^{1}	

^{1}Cancelled due to the COVID-19 pandemic

Top 10

QF, R16, R32, R64 = Round in which player lost in match play
"T" = Tied NT = No tournament
Note that the Champions was discontinued from 2023.

== Team appearances ==
Amateur

- European Boys' Team Championship (representing Ireland): 2005
- European Youths' Team Championship (representing Ireland): 2006

Professional

- Hero Cup (representing Great Britain & Ireland): 2023

== See also ==
- 2016 Web.com Tour Finals graduates
- 2017 Web.com Tour Finals graduates
