= Miccosukee Championship =

Tournament information
- Location: Miami, Florida
- Established: 2003
- Courses: Miccosukee Golf and Country Club
- Par: 71
- Length: 7,084 yards (6,478 m)
- Tour: Web.com Tour
- Format: Stroke play
- Prize fund: US$600,000
- Month played: October
- Final year: 2012

Tournament record score
- Aggregate: 264 Jason Kokrak (2011)
- To par: −20 as above

Final champion
- (United States) Shawn Stefani

Location map
- Location in the United States Location in Florida

The Miccosukee Championship was a golf tournament on the Web.com Tour from 2003 to 2012. It was played at the Miccosukee Golf & Country Club in Miami, Florida, U.S.

The 2012 purse was $600,000, with $108,000 going to the winner.

== Winners ==
Year	Winner	Score	To par	Margin of victory	Runner(s)-up
2012	(United States) Shawn Stefani	269	−15	5 strokes	(Australia) Alistair Presnell
2011	(United States) Jason Kokrak	264	−20	7 strokes	(United States) Mark Anderson
2010	(United States) Jason Gore	268	−16	4 strokes	(United States) Scott Gutschewski (United States) Kevin Kisner
2009	(United States) Chad Collins	274	−10	2 strokes	(Australia) Won Joon Lee (United States) Justin Smith (United States) Brian Smock
2008	(United States) D. A. Points	272	−12	Playoff	(United States) Matt Bettencourt
2007	(United States) Marc Turnesa	269	−15	1 stroke	(United States) David Mathis (Canada) Jon Mills
2006	(United States) Bryce Molder	270	−14	1 stroke	(United States) Boo Weekley
2005	Canceled due to Hurricane Wilma				
2004	(United States) D. J. Trahan	268	−16	4 strokes	(United States) Nick Watney
2003	(United States) Craig Bowden	270	−14	1 stroke	(United States) Chris Couch
