= Brendan Gielow =

American golfer (born 1987)

Personal information
- Nationality: United States
- Born: October 24, 1987 (age 39) Grand Rapids, Michigan, U.S.
- Height: 5 ft 10 in (1.78 m)
- Weight: 185 lb (84 kg; 13.2 st)

Career
- Sport: Golf
- College: Wake Forest
- Turned professional: 2010
- Former tour: eGolf Professional Tour
- Professional wins: 1

Brendan Gielow (born October 24, 1987) is an American professional golfer.

== Early life ==
In 1987, Gielow was born in Grand Rapids, Michigan, the son of Eric and Renea Gielow. As a child, his family moved to Norton Shores, Michigan. For high school, he attended Mona Shores High School. In his tenure at Mona Shores, he played four years on the varsity golf team. He earned the Mr. Golf title, given to the top high school golfer in Michigan, twice. In 2006, he graduated from Mona Shores.

He was also named to the Michigan Super Team, the All-State golf team, all four years he played; he is first and only person to earn that honor all four years of high school and as a freshman.

== Amateur career ==
Gielow enjoyed a successful freshman debut at Wake Forest University. He played in four of their five events, having a 73.33 stroke average, placing him fourth on the team. In his first tournament, the Carpet Capital Collegiate, he placed third overall with an eight-under-par 208.

In 2008 and 2009, respectively, Gielow won the Northeast Amateur and the Porter Cup.

== Professional career ==
In 2010, Gielow turned professional. In 2011, he won the Cowans Ford Open on the EGolf Professional Tour.

== Amateur wins ==
- 2008 Northeast Amateur
- 2009 Porter Cup

== Professional wins (1) ==
=== eGolf Professional Tour wins (1) ===
No.	Date	Tournament	Winning score	Margin of victory	Runners-up
1	Jun 25, 2011	Cowans Ford Open	−19 (64-66-65-70=265)	1 stroke	(Brazil) Fernando Mechereffe, (United States) Hudson Swafford

== U.S. national team appearances ==
Amateur

- Walker Cup: 2009 (winners)
