= EGolf Professional Tour seasons =

This page lists all eGolf Professional Tour (formerly the Tarheel Tour) seasons from its inaugural season in 2002.

The eGolf Professional Tour began as the Tarheel Tour in 2002, adopting the name of eGolf Professional Tour from 2009 onwards.

== 2002 Tarheel Tour ==
=== Schedule ===
The following table lists official events during the 2002 season.

Date	Tournament	Location	Purse (US$)	Winner (Note: The number in parentheses after each winner's name is the number of Tarheel Tour events they had won up to and including that tournament.)
Jul 3	Charlotte National Open	North Carolina	17,850	(United States) Matt Cannon (1)
Jul 18	Eagle Chase Classic	North Carolina	17,850	(United States) Matt Cannon (2)
Jul 26	Warrior Invitational	North Carolina	17,850	(England) Max Harris (1)
Aug 7	Waterford Classic	South Carolina	17,850	(United States) Cortney Brisson (1)
Aug 22	Tradition Invitational	North Carolina	17,850	(United States) Bob Boyd (1)
Aug 29	Emerald Lake Classic	North Carolina	17,850	(United States) Matt Cannon (3)
Sep 5	Stonebridge Open	North Carolina	17,850	(England) Max Harris (2)
Oct 3	Birkdale Invitational	North Carolina	17,850	(United States) Matt Cannon (4)
Oct 10	Springfield Open	South Carolina	17,850	(United States) Steve Marino (1)
Oct 17	Deer Brook Classic	North Carolina	17,850	(United States) Matt Cannon (5)
Oct 24	Tarheel Tour Championship	North Carolina	20,000	(United States) Steve Marino (2)

=== Money list ===
The money list was based on prize money won during the season, calculated in U.S. dollars.

Position	Player	Prize money ($)
1	(United States) Matt Cannon	26,557
2	(United States) Cortney Brisson	10,315
3	(England) Max Harris	10,000
4	(United States) Steve Marino	8,500
5	(United States) Derek Watson	6,166

== 2003 Tarheel Tour ==
=== Schedule ===
The following table lists official events during the 2003 season.

Date	Tournament	Location	Purse (US$)	Winner
Jun 19	Charlotte National Open	North Carolina	19,125	(United States) Matt Cannon (6)
Jun 26	Eagle Chase Classic	North Carolina	19,125	(United States) Ben Case (1)
Jul 17	Deer Brook Invitational	North Carolina	19,125	(United States) David Siegel (1)
Jul 24	Warrior Invitational	North Carolina	19,125	(United States) David Siegel (2)
Jul 31	Tillery Tradition Open	North Carolina	19,125	(United States) Chris Hockaday (1)
Aug 7	Tot Hill Farm Classic	North Carolina	19,125	(United States) Matt Cannon (7)
Aug 14	Skybrook Invitational	North Carolina	19,125	(United States) G.W. Cable (1)
Aug 21	Firethorne Open	North Carolina	19,125	(United States) David Siegel (3)
Aug 28	The Point Invitational	North Carolina	19,125	(United States) Korky Kemp (1)
Sep 4	Stonebridge Open	North Carolina	19,125	(United States) Matt Cannon (8)
Oct 1	Cabarrus Classic	North Carolina	19,125	(United States) Stephen Woodard (1)
Oct 9	Cowans Ford Open	North Carolina	19,125	(United States) Stephen Woodard (2)
Oct 19	Warrior Classic	North Carolina	19,125	(United States) Matt Cannon (9)
Nov 5	Northstone Open	North Carolina	19,125	(United States) Frank Adams III (1)
Nov 13	Birkdale Classic	North Carolina	19,125	(United States) Frank Adams III (2)
Nov 20	Tarheel Tour Championship	North Carolina	22,000	(United States) Ben St. John (1)

=== Money list ===
The money list was based on prize money won during the season, calculated in U.S. dollars.

Position	Player	Prize money ($)
1	(United States) Matt Cannon	26,685
2	(United States) David Siegel	18,860
3	(United States) Chris Hockaday	16,354
4	(South Africa) Stefaan van den Heever	14,737
5	(United States) Frank Adams III	13,013

== 2004 Tarheel Tour ==
=== Schedule ===
The following table lists official events during the 2004 season.

Date	Tournament	Location	Purse (US$)	Winner
Apr 22	Firethorne Open	North Carolina	25,000	(United States) Matt Cannon (10)
May 6	Emerald Lake Classic	North Carolina	25,000	(United States) Jeff Curl (1)
May 13	Eagle Chase Classic	North Carolina	25,000	(United States) Scott Parel (1)
May 27	Verdict Ridge Open	North Carolina	25,000	(United States) Derek Watson (1)
Jun 3	Multiple Directory Service Classic	North Carolina	25,000	(United States) David Mathis (1)
Jun 24	Warrior Invitational	North Carolina	25,000	(United States) Matt Cannon (11)
Jul 16	Charlotte National Open	North Carolina	25,000	(United States) Frank Adams III (3)
Jul 21	River Run Classic	North Carolina	25,000	(United States) Korky Kemp (2)
Jul 29	Providence Open	North Carolina	25,000	(United States) Matt Cannon (12)
Aug 5	Kannapolis Invitational	North Carolina	25,000	(United States) David Siegel (4)
Aug 19	Statesville Classic	North Carolina	25,000	(United States) Matt Cannon (13)
Aug 26	Raintree Invitational	North Carolina	25,000	(United States) Matt Johnson (1)
Sep 1	NorthStone Open	North Carolina	25,000	(United States) Matt Cannon (14)
Sep 22	Cabarrus Open	North Carolina	25,000	(United States) Matt Cannon (15)
Sep 29	Statesville Open	North Carolina	25,000	(United States) Tommy Gainey (1)
Oct 7	Fox Den Open	North Carolina	25,000	(United States) Scott Parel (2)
Oct 14	Cowans Ford Open	North Carolina	25,000	(United States) Joey Maxon (1)
Nov 5	Stonebridge Classic	North Carolina	25,000	(United States) David Mathis (2)
Nov 11	Rocky River Open	North Carolina	25,000	(United States) Joey Maxon (2)
Nov 18	Tarheel Tour Championship	North Carolina	37,500	(United States) Elliot Gealy (1)

=== Money list ===
The money list was based on prize money won during the season, calculated in U.S. dollars.

Position	Player	Prize money ($)
1	(United States) Matt Cannon	43,648
2	(United States) Frank Adams III	21,820
3	(United States) David Siegel	21,080
4	(United States) Jason Martin	15,955
5	(United States) Joey Maxon	15,642

== 2005 Tarheel Tour ==
=== Schedule ===
The following table lists official events during the 2005 season.

Date	Tournament	Location	Purse (US$)	Winner
Mar 30	NorthStone Open	North Carolina	43,750	(United States) Frank Adams III (4)
Apr 7	Rocky River Classic	North Carolina	43,750	(United States) David Seawell (1)
Apr 21	Verdict Ridge Open	North Carolina	43,750	(United States) Justin Hicks (1)
May 6	Warrior Golf Classic	North Carolina	43,750	(United States) Bryant MacKellar (1)
May 12	Treyburn Open	North Carolina	43,750	(United States) Richard Hanna (1)
May 26	Rock Hill Invitational	North Carolina	43,750	(United States) Chris Mundorf (1)
Jun 9	Eagle Chase Classic	North Carolina	43,750	(England) Gary Christian (1)
Jun 23	Anderson Creek Open	North Carolina	43,750	(United States) Jason Martin (1)
Jul 8	Charlotte National Open	North Carolina	43,750	(United States) Steve Gilley (1)
Jul 22	Skybrook Invitational	North Carolina	43,750	(United States) Ben Duncan (1)
Jul 28	South Carolina Classic	South Carolina	43,750	(United States) Matt Cannon (16)
Aug 11	Statesville Open	North Carolina	43,750	(South Africa) Justin Walters (1)
Aug 18	Coulter Real Estate Classic	North Carolina	43,750	(United States) David Seawell (2)
Aug 25	Kannapolis Classic	North Carolina	43,750	(United States) Tommy Biershenk (1)
Sep 8	Stonebridge Open	North Carolina	43,750	(United States) Matt Cannon (17)
Sep 14	Olde Sycamore Open	North Carolina	43,750	(United States) Jason Moon (1)
Sep 29	Cabarrus Open	North Carolina	43,750	(United States) David Sanchez (1)
Oct 6	Big Stakes Classic	North Carolina	43,750	(United States) Steve Gilley (2)
Oct 13	Cowans Ford Classic	North Carolina	43,750	(United States) Jason Moon (2)
Nov 4	Anderson & Strudwick Tour Championship	North Carolina	45,000	(Australia) Aaron Black (1)

=== Money list ===
The money list was based on prize money won during the season, calculated in U.S. dollars.

Position	Player	Prize money ($)
1	(United States) David Sanchez	36,038
2	(United States) Matt Cannon	35,388
3	(Brazil) Fernando Mechereffe	30,040
4	(United States) David Seawell	29,017
5	(United States) Jason Moon	26,625

== 2006 Tarheel Tour ==
=== Schedule ===
The following table lists official events during the 2006 season.

Date	Tournament	Location	Purse (US$)	Winner
Feb 23	Sandlapper Real Estate Classic	South Carolina	55,405	(United States) Dustin Bray (1)
Mar 2	Patriots Point Open	South Carolina	61,487	(United States) Tommy Gainey (2)
Mar 9	Match Play Championship	South Carolina	41,150	(Scotland) Barry Hume (1)
Mar 22	Rock Hill Open	South Carolina	54,665	(United States) Alex Hamilton (1)
Apr 14	Olde Sycamore Open	North Carolina	65,540	(United States) Tim Simpson (1)
Apr 20	Bermuda Run Open	North Carolina	62,770	(United States) Dustin Bray (2)
May 5	Warrior Classic	North Carolina	65,770	(United States) Andy Bare (1)
May 12	Sapona Classic	North Carolina	64,770	(United States) Kevin Taylor (1)
May 25	Treyburn Open	North Carolina	65,965	(United States) Dane Burkhart (1)
Jun 2	River Run Classic	North Carolina	65,665	(United States) Tommy Gainey (3)
Jun 16	Charlotte National Open	North Carolina	65,165	(United States) Kyle Reifers (1)
Jun 29	Rocky River Classic	North Carolina	61,110	(United States) Dane Burkhart (2)
Jul 9	Southern Open	North Carolina	85,467	(United States) Brian Quackenbush (1)
Jul 20	Salisbury Classic	North Carolina	61,025	(United States) Jason Martin (2)
Jul 27	Skybrook Open	North Carolina	57,575	(United States) David Sanchez (2)
Aug 17	Eagle Chase Classic	North Carolina	56,625	(United States) Jay McLuen (1)
Aug 24	Kannapolis Open	North Carolina	59,625	(United States) Phillipe Gasnier (1)
Aug 30	Coulter Real Estate Classic	North Carolina	58,835	(United States) Stephen Poole Jr. (1)
Sep 8	Stonebridge Classic	North Carolina	51,425	(United States) Jeff Curl (2)
Sep 13	Columbia Open	South Carolina	51,875	(United States) David Seawell (3)
Sep 29	Cabarrus Classic	North Carolina	60,000	(United States) Dustin Bray (3)
Oct 12	Cedarwood Classic	North Carolina	69,930	(United States) Billy Hurley III (1)
Oct 19	Bermuda Run Classic	North Carolina	51,150	(United States) John McAllister (1)
Nov 9	Sapona Open	North Carolina	43,125	(United States) Karl Diewock (1)
Nov 17	Firethorne Open	North Carolina	33,100	(United States) David Siegel (5)

=== Money list ===
The money list was based on prize money won during the season, calculated in U.S. dollars.

Position	Player	Prize money ($)
1	(United States) Dustin Bray	63,168
2	(United States) Tommy Gainey	47,196
3	(United States) Jason Martin	40,591
4	(United States) Jeff Curl	39,040
5	(United States) John McAllister	37,624

== 2007 Tarheel Tour ==
=== Schedule ===
The following table lists official events during the 2007 season.

Date	Tournament	Location	Purse (US$)	Winner
Feb 22	Rivertowne Open	South Carolina	97,550	(United States) Jody Bellflower (1)
Mar 1	Patriots Point Classic	South Carolina	85,700	(United States) Tommy Tolles (1)
Mar 10	Match Play Championship	South Carolina	53,800	(United States) Kevin Kisner (1)
Mar 29	Oldfield Open	South Carolina	86,600	(United States) Tommy Gainey (4)
Apr 5	River Run Classic	North Carolina	103,000	(United States) David Mathis (3)
May 4	Cabarrus Classic	North Carolina	108,100	(United States) William McGirt (1)
May 11	Sapona Open	North Carolina	90,800	(United States) Justin Hicks (2)
Jun 1	Walnut Creek Classic	North Carolina	89,600	(United States) Jay McLuen (2)
Jun 14	Bermuda Run Open	North Carolina	93,050	(United States) Scott Brown (1)
Jun 21	Warrior Classic	North Carolina	83,525	(United States) Matt Cannon (18)
Jun 28	Spring Creek Classic	Virginia	84,000	(United States) Roberto Castro (1)
Jul 14	Southern Open	North Carolina	125,000	(South Africa) Shaun Norris (1)
Jul 20	Olde Sycamore Open	North Carolina	95,500	(United States) Doug Fiese (1)
Aug 3	Musgrove Mill Classic	South Carolina	85,700	(United States) Brendon Todd (1)
Aug 31	NorthStone Open	North Carolina	104,500	(United States) Matt Cannon (19)
Sep 7	Stonebridge Classic	North Carolina	89,000	(United States) Jonathan Fricke (1)
Sep 28	MonaVie Open	North Carolina	89,675	(United States) Brian Quackenbush (2)
Oct 4	Columbia Open	South Carolina	96,000	(United States) Lee Stroever (1)
Oct 12	Salisbury Classic	North Carolina	103,400	(United States) Ryan Blaum (1)
Oct 19	The Championship At Walnut Creek	North Carolina	102,700	(Canada) Richard Scott (1)
Nov 9	Match Play Bonus Championship	North Carolina	28,000	(United States) Scott Brown (2)

=== Money list ===
The money list was based on prize money won during the season, calculated in U.S. dollars.

Position	Player	Prize money ($)
1	(United States) Matt Cannon	81,724
2	(United States) William McGirt	59,964
3	(United States) Scott Brown	55,579
4	(United States) Tommy Gainey	54,713
5	(United States) Andy Bare	51,550

== 2008 Tarheel Tour ==
=== Schedule ===
The following table lists official events during the 2008 season.

Date	Tournament	Location	Purse (US$)	Winner
Mar 6	Rivertowne Open	South Carolina	118,000	(United States) David Robinson (1)
Mar 28	TPGG Classic	South Carolina	250,000	(United States) Paul Butler (1)
Apr 11	Manor Classic	Virginia	109,345	(United States) Jay McLuen (3)
Apr 25	Sapona Open	North Carolina	110,565	(United States) Andy Bare (2)
May 2	Cabarrus Classic	North Carolina	129,400	(United States) Doug Fiese (2)
May 9	NorthStone Open	North Carolina	118,750	(United States) David Robinson (2)
May 23	Walnut Creek Classic	North Carolina	99,000	(United States) Jonathan Moore (1)
May 30	Bermuda Run Open	North Carolina	101,200	(United States) Kevin Kisner (2)
Jun 12	Warrior Classic	North Carolina	121,250	(United States) Andy Bare (3)
Jun 20	Spring Creek Classic	Virginia	124,500	(Bermuda) Michael Sims (1)
Jun 26	Pete Dye Classic	Virginia	92,550	(United States) Ryan Blaum (2)
Jul 12	Southern Open	North Carolina	137,600	(Canada) Ted Brown (1)
Jul 18	River Hills Open	South Carolina	105,600	(United States) Roberto Castro (2)
Jul 25	Lake Hickory Open	North Carolina	97,100	(United States) Tommy Biershenk (2)
Aug 22	Firethorne Open	North Carolina	116,700	(Canada) Ted Brown (2)
Sep 26	Charlotte National Open	North Carolina	130,000	(United States) David Robinson (3)
Oct 2	Columbia Open	South Carolina	130,000	(United States) Blake Adams (1)
Oct 10	Walnut Creek Open	North Carolina	150,000	(United States) Jeff Curl (3)
Oct 18	eGolf Tarheel Tour Championship	Virginia	200,000	(United States) Matt Davidson (1)

=== Money list ===
The money list was based on prize money won during the season, calculated in U.S. dollars.

Position	Player	Prize money ($)
1	(United States) David Robinson	106,645
2	(United States) Jeff Curl	75,924
3	(United States) Kevin Kisner	74,052
4	(Canada) Ted Brown	73,910
5	(United States) Andy Bare	56,714

== 2009 eGolf Professional Tour ==
=== Schedule ===
The following table lists official events during the 2009 season.

Date	Tournament	Location	Purse (US$)	Winner (Note: The number in parentheses after each winner's name is the number of eGolf Professional Tour events they had won up to and including that tournament.)
Mar 13	FairwayStyles.com Open	South Carolina	220,000	(United States) Kyle Dobbs (1)
Mar 20	Pine Needles Classic	North Carolina	220,000	(United States) Tom Gillis (1)
Apr 4	Savannah Quarters Championship	Georgia	300,000	(United States) Tom Gillis (2)
Apr 10	Bushnell Championship	North Carolina	220,000	(United States) Scott Brown (3)
May 1	Snap Fitness Open	North Carolina	220,000	(United States) Jhared Hack (1)
May 9	Walnut Creek Championship	North Carolina	300,000	(England) Chris Rodgers (1)
May 22	Bolle Classic	North Carolina	220,000	(Australia) David Lutterus (1)
Jun 5	Greater Richmond Open	Virginia	220,000	(Australia) David Lutterus (2)
Jun 27	Spring Creek Championship	Virginia	300,000	(United States) Roberto Castro (3)
Jul 17	Southern Open	North Carolina	220,000	(United States) Clint Jensen (1)
Jul 24	Forest Oaks Classic	North Carolina	220,210	(United States) Scott Brown (4)
Aug 8	Columbia Championship	South Carolina	300,000	(United States) Billy Horschel (1)
Aug 14	River Run Championship	North Carolina	220,000	(United States) Kyle Dobbs (2)
Aug 21	South Charlotte Classic	North Carolina	220,000	(United States) Frank Adams III (5)
Aug 29	The Championship at Savannah Harbor	Georgia	250,000	(United States) Roberto Castro (4)
Sep 18	Walnut Creek Open	North Carolina	220,000	(United States) Dustin Bray (4)
Sep 25	Cabarrus Classic	North Carolina	220,000	(United States) Scott Brown (5)
Oct 15	eGolf Tour Championship	North Carolina	300,000	(United States) Matt Davidson (2)

=== Money list ===
The money list was based on prize money won during the season, calculated in U.S. dollars.

Position	Player	Prize money ($)
1	(United States) Scott Brown	142,362
2	(United States) Matt Davidson	138,269
3	(United States) Roberto Castro	111,091
4	(England) Chris Rodgers	92,729
5	(United States) Kyle Dobbs	90,582

== 2010 eGolf Professional Tour ==
=== Schedule ===
The following table lists official events during the 2010 season.

Date	Tournament	Location	Purse (US$)	Winner
Feb 20	Palmetto Hall Championship	South Carolina	231,014	(Scotland) Russell Knox (1)
Feb 26	Savannah Quarters Classic	Georgia	233,941	(United States) Roberto Castro (5)
Mar 20	Cabarrus Classic	North Carolina	233,847	(United States) Jason Kokrak (1)
Mar 27	Golf in Morocco Classic	South Carolina	232,166	(United States) Frank Adams III (6)
Apr 10	The Championship at St. James Plantation	North Carolina	222,951	(Canada) Richard Scott (2)
May 1	River Hills Classic	North Carolina	235,001	(United States) Chris Baker (1)
May 8	Cowans Ford Open	North Carolina	234,470	(United States) Clint Jensen (2)
May 29	Grand Harbor Open	North Carolina	235,000	(United States) Scott Weatherly (1)
Jun 5	HGM Hotels Classic	North Carolina	235,000	(United States) Chris Thompson (1)
Jun 19	Bolle Classic	North Carolina	233,847	(United States) Tommy Biershenk (3)
Jun 26	Bushnell Championship	North Carolina	232,696	(United States) Jason Kokrak (2)
Jul 17	Southern Open	North Carolina	233,847	(United States) Jhared Hack (2)
Jul 24	Forest Oaks Classic	North Carolina	235,000	(United States) Ben Martin (1)
Aug 7	eGolf Tour Championship	Virginia	155,000	(United States) Tadd Fujikawa (1)
Sep 11	Manor Classic	Virginia	113,715	(United States) Brian Harman (1)
Sep 24	Caddy for a Cure Classic	North Carolina	139,792	(United States) Drew Weaver (1)
Oct 14	Callaway Gardens Championship	Georgia	141,217	(United States) Alex Hamilton (2)

=== Money list ===
The money list was based on prize money won during the season, calculated in U.S. dollars.

Position	Player	Prize money ($)
1	(United States) Jason Kokrak	115,225
2	(United States) Tommy Biershenk	104,365
3	(United States) Brian Harman	87,834
4	(United States) Tadd Fujikawa	75,118
5	(United States) Drew Weaver	71,442

== 2011 eGolf Professional Tour ==
=== Schedule ===
The following table lists official events during the 2011 season.

Date	Tournament	Location	Purse (US$)	Winner
Feb 19	Swiftwick Shootout	South Carolina	200,102	(United States) Corey Nagy (1)
Mar 9	Samanah Classic	Morocco	250,000	(United States) Chris McCartin (1)
Mar 15	El Jadida Classic	Morocco	250,000	(United States) Phillip Mollica (1)
Apr 16	The Championship at St. James Plantation	North Carolina	246,039	(United States) Jason Kokrak (3)
Apr 23	Columbia Open	South Carolina	249,511	(United States) Chris Thompson (2)
May 7	Willow Creek Open	North Carolina	230,992	(United States) Jerry Richardson (1)
May 28	Donald Ross Championship	North Carolina	250,000	(United States) Jason Kokrak (4)
Jun 4	River Hills Classic	North Carolina	185,850	(United States) Brice Garnett (1)
Jun 18	Bolle Classic	North Carolina	200,394	(United States) Corey Nagy (2)
Jun 25	Cowans Ford Open	North Carolina	207,842	(United States) Brendan Gielow (1)
Jul 16	Southern Open	North Carolina	206,685	(United States) Brice Garnett (2)
Jul 23	Scratch Golf Championship	South Carolina	178,251	(United States) Ryan Nelson (1)
Aug 6	Grand Harbor Open	South Carolina	153,944	(United States) Chris Kamin (1)
Aug 13	HGM Hotels Classic	North Carolina	190,480	(United States) Hudson Swafford (1)
Sep 22	Cabarrus Classic	North Carolina	122,176	(United States) Ryan Nelson (2)
Sep 30	Bushnell Classic	Virginia	122,544	(United States) Matt Ryan (1)
Oct 12	Salisbury Classic	North Carolina	109,158	(United States) Corey Nagy (3)

=== Money list ===
The money list was based on prize money won during the season, calculated in U.S. dollars.

Position	Player	Prize money ($)
1	(United States) Corey Nagy	89,607
2	(United States) Jason Kokrak	85,460
3	(United States) Ryan Nelson	83,261
4	(United States) Brice Garnett	78,216
5	(Brazil) Fernando Mechereffe	76,978

== 2012 eGolf Professional Tour ==
=== Schedule ===
The following table lists official events during the 2012 season.

Date	Tournament	Location	Purse (US$)	Winner
Feb 18	Palmetto Hall Championship	South Carolina	193,467	(United States) Brent Delahoussaye (1)
Feb 25	Oldfield Open	South Carolina	174,357	(United States) Chris Naegel (1)
Mar 17	Pine Needles Classic	North Carolina	199,238	(United States) Kevin Foley (1)
Mar 24	Irish Creek Classic	North Carolina	201,272	(United States) David May (1)
Mar 30	River Run Classic	North Carolina	99,360	(Republic of Ireland) Séamus Power (1)
Apr 14	The Championship at St. James Plantation	North Carolina	161,017	(United States) Joshua Brock (1)
Apr 20	Forest Oaks Classic	North Carolina	107,640	(United States) Clint Jensen (3)
May 5	Columbia Open	South Carolina	162,862	(United States) Jack Fields (1)
May 18	Willow Creek Open	North Carolina	99,866	(United States) Drew Weaver (2)
May 26	River Hills Classic	North Carolina	203,590	(United States) Chris Kamin (2)
Jun 2	HGM Hotels Classic	North Carolina	172,039	(United States) Matthew Harmon (1)
Jun 16	Bolle Classic	North Carolina	157,753	(United States) Jhared Hack (3)
Jun 22	Spring Creek Classic	Virginia	94,852	(Republic of Ireland) Séamus Power (2)
Jun 30	The Championship at Wintergreen Resort	Virginia	104,443	(United States) Peter Malnati (1)
Jul 14	Southern Open	North Carolina	175,161	(United States) Drew Weaver (3)
Jul 21	River Landing Open	North Carolina	131,642	(United States) Chesson Hadley (1)
Aug 4	The Championship at Woodside Plantation	South Carolina	128,994	(United States) Gordon Strother (1)
Aug 11	Grand Harbor Open	South Carolina	99,004	(United States) Ryan Nelson (3)
Sep 14	The Championship at Star Fort	South Carolina	84,180	(South Africa) Anton Haig (1)
Sep 21	Cabarrus Classic	North Carolina	83,628	(United States) Corbin Mills (1)
Sep 28	Olde Sycamore Open	North Carolina	89,148	(Sweden) Henrik Norlander (1)
Oct 11	NorthStone Open	North Carolina	83,812	(United States) Tim Madigan (1)
Nov 2	Forest Oaks Open	North Carolina	41,906	(United States) Jonathan Fricke (2)
Nov 8	The Championship at River Run	North Carolina	28,106	(United States) Matt Ryan (2)

=== Money list ===
The money list was based on prize money won during the season, calculated in U.S. dollars.

Position	Player	Prize money ($)
1	(United States) Drew Weaver	121,737
2	(United States) Chesson Hadley	87,090
3	(United States) Chris Epperson	74,577
4	(United States) Peter Malnati	66,741
5	(United States) Kevin Foley	63,291

== 2013 eGolf Professional Tour ==
=== Schedule ===
The following table lists official events during the 2013 season.

Date	Tournament	Location	Purse (US$)	Winner
Feb 17	Palmetto Hall Championship	South Carolina	134,805	(United States) Matt Hendrix (1)
Feb 23	Oldfield Open	South Carolina	108,675	(United States) Brent Witcher (1)
Mar 9	Irish Creek Classic	North Carolina	124,787	(United States) Ryan Nelson (4)
Mar 14	The Championship at Ballantyne Country Club	North Carolina	113,130	(United States) Chris Thompson (3)
Mar 30	The Championship at St. James Plantation	North Carolina	128,992	(United States) Bryce Ledford (1)
Apr 4	Founders Club Classic	North Carolina	88,020	(Canada) Cam Burke (1)
Apr 19	Forest Oaks Classic	North Carolina	110,160	(United States) T. J. Howe (1)
May 4	Columbia Open	South Carolina	112,528	(United States) Tanner Ervin (1)
May 17	Palisades Classic	North Carolina	105,840	(United States) Andy Bare (4)
May 24	Willow Creek Open	North Carolina	118,800	(United States) Josh Persons (1)
May 31	Sedgefield Classic	North Carolina	97,200	(Australia) Mitch Krywulycz (1)
Jun 14	Spring Creek Classic	Virginia	100,000	(United States) Bruce Woodall (1)
Jun 21	Mimosa Hills Open	North Carolina	92,880	(United States) Martin Jeppesen (1)
Jul 13	Southern Open	North Carolina	128,773	(United States) Chip Lynn (1)
Jul 20	HGM Hotels Classic	North Carolina	116,137	(United States) Jesse Hutchins (1)
Aug 2	River Run Classic	North Carolina	107,190	(United States) Frank Adams III (7)
Aug 17	River Hills Classic	South Carolina	94,264	(United States) Bruce Woodall (2)
Aug 30	Mid Pines Classic	North Carolina	123,606	(United States) T. J. Howe (2)
Sep 7	River Landing Open	North Carolina	78,104	(United States) Ryan Nelson (5)
Sep 27	Columbia Classic	South Carolina	87,480	(United States) Matt Ryan (3)
Oct 4	Salisbury Classic	North Carolina	93,690	(United States) Wil Collins (1)
Oct 10	NorthStone Open	North Carolina	74,520	(United States) Frank Adams III (8)
Nov 8	Cabarrus Classic	North Carolina	45,090	(United States) T. J. Howe (3)

=== Money list ===
The money list was based on prize money won during the season, calculated in U.S. dollars.

Position	Player	Prize money ($)
1	(United States) Frank Adams III	69,965
2	(United States) Bruce Woodall	67,115
3	(United States) T. J. Howe	60,479
4	(Republic of Ireland) Séamus Power	55,505
5	(United States) Harold Varner III	54,418

== 2014 eGolf Professional Tour ==
=== Schedule ===
The following table lists official events during the 2014 season.

Date	Tournament	Location	Purse (US$)	Winner
Mar 1	Palmetto Hall Championship	South Carolina	85,979	(United States) Ethan Tracy (1)
Mar 8	The Championship at Callawassie Island	South Carolina	85,374	(United States) John-Tyler Griffin (1)
Mar 21	NorthStone Open	North Carolina	97,631	(United States) Adam Webb (1)
Mar 28	Cowans Ford Open	North Carolina	85,095	(Republic of Ireland) Séamus Power (3)
Apr 12	The Championship at St. James Plantation	North Carolina	100,040	(United States) Kevin Roy (1)
May 3	Columbia Open	South Carolina	103,240	(South Korea) Sunny Kim (1)
May 23	Willow Creek Open	North Carolina	125,000	(United States) Andrew Yun (1)
May 30	Sedgefield Classic	North Carolina	102,100	(Canada) Ted Brown (3)
Jun 14	Forest Oaks Classic	North Carolina	105,490	(United States) Jack Fields (2)
Jun 21	Mimosa Hills Open	North Carolina	104,262	(United States) T. J. Howe (4)
Jul 3	ArrowCreek Open	Nevada	102,547	(United States) Craig Barlow (1)
Jul 12	Southern Open	North Carolina	109,180	(Republic of Ireland) Séamus Power (4)
Jul 18	Cabarrus Classic	North Carolina	100,000	(Australia) Jake Higginbottom (1)
Aug 1	Spring Creek Classic	Virginia	99,743	(United States) Drew Weaver (4)
Aug 16	Sapona Ridge Classic	North Carolina	87,383	(French Polynesia) Vaita Guillaume (1)
Aug 30	River Hills Championship	South Carolina	225,000	(United States) Ethan Tracy (2)
Sep 13	Island View Casino Championship	Mississippi	225,000	(United States) Dustin Bray (5)
Nov 1	The Championship at Red Hawk	Nevada	250,000	(United States) Justin Peters (1)
Dec 6	eGolf Tour Championship	South Carolina	300,000	(United States) Ryan Nelson (6)

=== Money list ===
The money list was based on prize money won during the season, calculated in U.S. dollars.

Position	Player	Prize money ($)
1	(United States) Ryan Nelson	112,851
2	(Republic of Ireland) Séamus Power	80,910
3	(French Polynesia) Vaita Guillaume	77,180
4	(United States) Ethan Tracy	66,418
5	(United States) T. J. Howe	54,563

== 2015 eGolf Professional Tour ==
=== Schedule ===
The following table lists official events during the 2015 season.

Date	Tournament	Location	Purse (US$)	Winner
Feb 28	Palmetto Hall Championship	South Carolina	100,000	(United States) Chris Epperson (1)
Mar 6	Mid Pines Classic	North Carolina	100,000	(United States) Scott Harrington (1)
Mar 20	Nova Tax Group Open	North Carolina	100,000	(United States) T. J. Howe (5)
Apr 4	The Championship at St. James	North Carolina	83,123	(United States) Drew Weaver (5)
Apr 24	Sedgefield Classic	North Carolina	100,681	(United States) Ryan Sullivan (1)
May 2	Forest Oaks Classic	North Carolina	100,000	(United States) Matt Ryan (4)
May 22	Willow Creek Open	North Carolina	105,830	(United States) Dykes Harbin (1)
May 31	Biggs Cadillac Buick GMC Open	North Carolina	200,000	(United States) Frank Adams III (9)
Jun 19	Spring Creek Classic	Virginia	80,966	(United States) Richard Fountain (1)
Jun 27	Mimosa Hills Open	North Carolina	90,415	(United States) Kevin McLister (1)
Jul 11	Imperial Headwear Southern Open	North Carolina	100,000	(United States) Grayson Murray (1)
Jul 17	Cabarrus Classic	North Carolina	76,595	(United States) Corey Nagy (4)
Jul 31	Verdict Ridge Open	North Carolina	73,935	(United States) Michael Cromie (1)
Aug 8	River Hills Classic	South Carolina	75,014	(United States) Ryan Nelson (7)

=== Money list ===
The money list was based on prize money won during the season, calculated in U.S. dollars.

Position	Player	Prize money ($)
1	(United States) Frank Adams III	58,385
2	(United States) T. J. Howe	57,751
3	(Scotland) Jimmy Gunn	51,165
4	(United States) Drew Weaver	46,995
5	(United States) Dykes Harbin	44,707
