= NCAA Division III men's golf championship =

College golf championship

NCAA Division III Men's Golf Championships

Tournament information
- Location: 2026: Howey-in-the-Hills, Florida
- Established: 1975
- Courses: 2026: Mission Inn Resort & Club; El Campeon and Los Colinas courses
- Par: 2026: 72/71
- Length: 2026: 6,778 yards (6,198 m) (El Campeon); 6,820 yards (6,240 m) (Los Colinas)
- Format: Stroke play
- Month played: May

Current champion
- Team: Claremont-Mudd-Scripps; Individual: Sebi Aliaga (Claremont-Mudd-Scripps)

The NCAA Division III Men's Golf Championships is the annual golf tournament, typically played in mid-May, to determine the team and individual national champions of men's collegiate golf in the United States. It has been played annually since 1975, when it split-away from the NCAA College Division Men's Golf Championships when the NCAA split into its current three-division structure.

It is a stroke play team competition, but there is also an award for the lowest scoring individual competitor.

Methodist is the most successful program with 15 national titles.

== Results ==
Year	Site (Host team)	Par	Team championship				Individual championship	
Year	Site (Host team)	Par	Champion	Score	Runner-up	Score	Champion	Score
1975	Martin, TN (Tennessee–Martin)	72 †	Wooster	907	Hampden–Sydney	909	Charles Baskervill (Hampden–Sydney)	278
1976	Springfield, OH (Wittenberg)	72 (288)	Stanislaus State	1,221	Ashland	1,228	Dan Lisle (Stanislaus State)	298
1977	Gambier, OH (Kenyon)	72 (288)	Stanislaus State	1,222	Southeastern Massachusetts	1,225	David Downing (Southeastern Massachusetts)	296
1978	Wooster, OH (Wooster)	72 (288)	Stanislaus State	1,223	Allegheny	1,232	Jim Quinn (Oswego State)	299
1979	Hampden Sydney, VA (Hampden–Sydney)	72 (288)	Stanislaus State	1,269	Slippery Rock	1,318	Mike Bender (Stanislaus State)	312
1980	Pella, IA (Central)	72 (288)	Stanislaus State	1,156	Ramapo	1,177	Mike Bender (Stanislaus State)	286
1981	Greensboro, NC (Greensboro)	72 (288)	Stanislaus State	1,262	Roanoke	1,265	Ryan Fox (UNC Greensboro)	306
1982	Springfield, OH (Wittenberg)	72 (288)	Ramapo	1,200	Stanislaus State	1,201	Cliff Smith (Stanislaus State)	295
1983	Wooster, OH (Wooster)	72 (288)	Allegheny	1,229	Ramapo	1,231	Matt Clarke (Allegheny)	297
1984	Oswego, NY (SUNY Oswego)	72 (288)	Stanislaus State	1,210	Methodist	1,216	Bob Osborne (Redlands)	294
1985	Rochester, NY (Rochester)	72 (288)	Stanislaus State	1,211	UC San Diego	1,213	Brian Goldsworthy (Central)	297
1986	Wilkes Barre, PA (King's)	71 (284)	Stanislaus State	1,208	UC San Diego	1,217	Eric Meerbach (WPI)	296
1987	Delaware, OH (Ohio Wesleyan)	72 (288)	Stanislaus State	1,200	UC San Diego	1,214	Pat Weishan (UC San Diego)	289
1988	Greensboro, NC (Greensboro)	71 † (284)	Stanislaus State	888	Greensboro	914	Glenn Andrade (Stanislaus State)	218
1989	Pella, IA (Central)	72 (288)	Stanislaus State	1,202	Methodist	1,210	John McCullough (Methodist)	295
1990	Atlanta, GA (Emory)	72 (288)	Methodist	1,172	Gustavus Adolphus; Ohio Wesleyan	1,202	Rob Pilewski (Methodist)	289
1991	Lincoln, NE (Nebraska Wesleyan)	72 (288)	Methodist	1,209	Gustavus Adolphus	1,224	Lee Palms (Emory)	300
1992	Wooster, OH (Wooster)	72 (288)	Methodist	1,200	Gustavus Adolphus	1,213	Jon Lindquist (Gustavus Adolphus)	283
1993	San Diego, CA (San Diego)	72 (288)	UC San Diego	1,190	Ohio Wesleyan	1,202	Ryan Jenkins (Methodist)	294
1994	Fayetteville, NC (Methodist)	72 (288)	Methodist	1,177	UC San Diego	1,201	Scott Scovil (Christopher Newport)	289
1995	Terre Haute, IN (Rose–Hulman)	72 † (216)	Methodist	899	Otterbein	917	Ryan Jenkins (Methodist)	218
1996	Saratoga Springs, NY (Skidmore)	72 (288)	Methodist	1,184	Skidmore	1,186	Mike Adamson (Methodist)	285
1997	Westerville, OH (Otterbein)	72 (288)	Methodist	1,191	Greensboro	1,226	Brion McLaughlin (Methodist)	297
1998	Atlanta, GA (Emory)	72 (288)	Methodist	1,143	Otterbein	1,179	Chad Collins (Methodist)	283
1999	Williamstown, MA (Williams)	72 (288)	Methodist	1,190	UC San Diego	1,217	Chad Collins (Methodist)	284
2000	Olivet, MI (Olivet)	71 † (284)	Greensboro	881	Methodist	882	Kevin O'Connell (Greensboro)	211
2001	St. Louis, MO (Maryville)	71 (284)	Wisconsin–Eau Claire	1,162	Guilford	1,163	Chad Collins (Methodist)	281
2002	Lincoln, NE (Nebraska Wesleyan)	71 (284)	Guilford	1,212	Greensboro	1,218	Chris Noll (Wesley)	293
2003	Delaware, OH (Ohio Wesleyan)	71 (284)	Averett	1,175	Wesley	1,180	Janne Mommo (Averett)	281
2004	Redlands, CA (Redlands)	72 (288)	Gustavus Adolphus	1,178	Redlands	1,190	Chad Poling (Ohio Wesleyan)	282
2005	Howey-in-the-Hills, FL	72 (288)	Guilford	1,174	Redlands	1,199	Colin Clark (Guilford)	290^{P}
2006	Lincoln, NE (Nebraska Wesleyan)	71 (284)	Nebraska Wesleyan	1,193	Redlands	1,203	Stephen Goodridge (Rochester)	289
2007	Anderson, IN (Anderson)	72 (288)	St. John's (MN)	1,204	La Verne	1,216	Scott Harris, Jr. (St. John Fisher)	287
2008	Atlanta, GA (Emory)	71 (284)	St. John's (MN)	1,192	Redlands	1,195	Clinton Dammann (Saint John's)	285
2009	Port St. Lucie, FL	72 (288)	Oglethorpe	1,164	La Verne	1,168	Olafur Loftsson (Oglethorpe)	285^{P}
2010	Hershey, PA	71/72 (287)	Methodist	1,177	Guilford	1,178	Tain Lee (Claremont–Mudd–Scripps)	280
2011	Greensboro, NC	72 (288)	Greensboro	1,167	Illinois Wesleyan	1,173	Chris Morris (Centre)	274
2012	Howey-in-the-Hills, FL	72 (288)	Oglethorpe	1,171	Transylvania	1,191	Anthony Maccaglia (Oglethorpe)	282
2013	Miramar Beach, FL	71/72 (286)	Texas–Tyler	1,167	Transylvania	1,174	Brad Shigezawa (Claremont–Mudd–Scripps)	283
2014	Greensboro, NC	72 (288)	Schreiner	1,185	Oglethorpe	1,190	Bobby Holden (Redlands)	279
2015	Greensboro, NC	72 (288)	Methodist	1,173	LaGrange	1,176	Kelby Scharmann (La Verne)	279
2016	Penfield, NY	72/71 (287)	Claremont-Mudd-Scripps	1,198	Huntingdon	1,204	Evan Cox (Virginia Wesleyan)	295^{P}
2017	Howey-in-the-Hills, FL	72 (288)	Wittenberg	1,180	Guilford	1,182	Josh Gibson (Hope)	287^{P}
2018	Greensboro, NC	72 (288)	Methodist	1,159	Washington and Lee	1,170	Brian Peccie (Washington and Lee)	285^{P}
2019	Nicholasville, KY	72 (288)	Illinois Wesleyan	1,174	Huntingdon	1,177	Sam Goldenring (Williams)	285
2020	Cancelled due to the COVID-19 pandemic							
2021	Wheeling, WV	71/70 (283)	Illinois Wesleyan	1,155	Methodist	1,168	Will Hocker (Webster)	285
2022	Howey-in-the-Hills, FL	72/71 (287)	Methodist	1,168	Hampden–Sydney	1,176	Andre Chi (Methodist)	283
2023	Nicholasville, KY	72 (288)	Carnegie Mellon	1,151	Piedmont	1,157	Josh Hebrink (Piedmont)	281
2024	Boulder City, NV	72 (288)	Methodist	1,131	Carnegie Mellon	1,132	Michael O'Sullivan (Oglethorpe)	276
2025	Penfield, NY	72 (288)	Methodist	1,175	Illinois Wesleyan	1,180	Edward Coffren (Lynchburg)	280
2026	Howey-in-the-Hills, FL	72/71 (286)	Claremont–Mudd–Scripps	1,135 (Note: Claremont–Mudd–Scripps won in a sudden-death playoff.)	Illinois Wesleyan	1,135	Sebi Aliaga (Claremont–Mudd–Scripps)	277

- † One of the four scheduled rounds was cancelled
- ^{P} Individual championship determined by playoff

== Multiple winners ==
=== Team ===
The following schools have won more than one team championship:

- 15: Methodist
- 12: Cal State Stanislaus
- 2: Claremont–Mudd–Scripps, Guilford, Illinois Wesleyan, St. John's, Greensboro, Oglethorpe

=== Individual ===
The following men have won more than one individual championship:

- 3: Chad Collins
- 2: Mike Bender, Ryan Jenkins

=== Individual champion's school ===
The following schools have produced more than one individual champion:

- 10: Methodist
- 5: Cal State Stanislaus
- 3: Oglethorpe, Claremont-Mudd-Scripps
- 2: Redlands

== See also ==
- NAIA men's golf championship
