= Chris Thompson (golfer) =

American professional golfer (born 1976)

Personal information
- Full name: Christopher David Thompson
- Nationality: United States
- Born: July 11, 1976 (age 50) Independence, Kansas, U.S.
- Height: 6 ft 2 in (188 cm)
- Weight: 195 lb (88 kg)

Career
- Sport: Golf
- College: University of Kansas
- Turned professional: 1999
- Current tour: Korn Ferry Tour
- Former tours: PGA Tour eGolf Professional Tour; Golden Bear Tour
- Professional wins: 4

Best results in major championships
- Masters Tournament: DNP
- PGA Championship: DNP
- U.S. Open: CUT: 2014
- The Open Championship: DNP

Christopher David Thompson (born July 11, 1976) is an American professional golfer currently playing on the PGA Tour.

== Early life and education ==
Thompson attended the University of Kansas where he was a two-time all-American, the first to do so at the university. He earned a degree in Business Administration.

== Career ==
Thompson turned professional in 1999 and qualified for the Web.com Tour in 2007. He played in 30 events that year, with only 16 starts in 2008 and losing his tour status. He failed to qualify for the Web.com Tour in 2015 by missing a birdie putt on his final hole of the tour's qualifying tournament. He qualified for the tour in 2018 and finished the season as one of the most productive players.

Thompson earned his PGA Tour card for the 2018–19 season after finishing in the top 25 on the Web.com Tour money list, becoming a rookie on the tour at the age of 42. Going into the tour, he had nine professional victories, including the 2014 Nebraska Open.

== Professional wins (4) ==
=== eGolf Professional Tour wins (3) ===
No.	Date	Tournament	Winning score	To par	Margin of victory	Runner(s)-up
1	Jun 5, 2010	HGM Hotels Classic	68-62-68-68=266	−21	2 strokes	(United States) Tommy Biershenk, (United States) Ryan Gildersleeve
2	Apr 23, 2011	Columbia Open	67-65-66-66=264	−23	2 strokes	(Canada) Brad Fritsch
3	Mar 14, 2013	The Championship at Ballantyne Country Club	68-65=133 (Note: Shortened to 36 holes due to weather.)	−11	2 strokes	(United States) Chris Epperson

=== Golden Bear Tour wins (1) ===
No.	Date	Tournament	Winning score	To par	Margin of victory	Runner-up
1	Jul 12, 2001	St Andrews Classic	66-67-72=205	−11	Playoff	(United States) Kris Maffet

== See also ==
- 2018 Web.com Tour Finals graduates
