= Drew Weaver =

American Professional golfer (born 1987)

Personal information
- Nationality: United States
- Born: May 18, 1987 (age 39) High Point, North Carolina, U.S.
- Height: 6 ft 0 in (1.83 m)
- Weight: 170 lb (77 kg; 12 st)

Career
- Sport: Golf
- College: Virginia Tech
- Turned professional: 2009
- Current tour: Korn Ferry Tour
- Former tours: PGA Tour Canada eGolf Professional Tour
- Professional wins: 6

Best results in major championships
- Masters Tournament: CUT: 2008
- PGA Championship: DNP
- U.S. Open: T40: 2009
- The Open Championship: CUT: 2007

Achievements and awards
- eGolf Professional Tour money list winner: 2012

Drew Weaver (born May 18, 1987) is an American professional golfer.

== Early life ==
Weaver was born in High Point, North Carolina. He grew up playing at nearby Willow Creek Country Club.

== Amateur career ==
He won the 2007 Amateur Championship with a 2 & 1 victory over Australian Tim Stewart.

Weaver played college golf at Virginia Tech. He began competing in professional tournaments shortly after graduating in 2009. He made his first cut in a major at the 2009 U.S. Open where he finished tied for 40th. He played on the 2009 Walker Cup team.

== Professional career ==
In 2009, Weaver turned professional. Since 2010, Weaver has played mostly on the eGolf Professional Tour and had a successful first year. Off-the-course matters diverted his focus for the first part of the year, as Weaver's mother was battling breast cancer. She regained her health and Drew regained his form. He finished outside of the top 8 only once on Tour after May 2010. He also played two events on the PGA Tour in 2010: the Greenbrier Classic and the Wyndham Championship, where he tied for 41st. In 2011, he played in the Memorial Tournament, finishing T45. It was his third cut in ten career PGA Tour events.

In 2012, Weaver started his eGolf Tour season with two missed cuts. He won two events in the first half of the season and was the tour's money leader. He also became the quickest to earn $100,000 in a season.

In 2015, Weaver qualified for PGA Tour Canada with a T7 at the qualifying tournament. He won the first event of the season, the PC Financial Open.

In 2017, Weaver won the GProTour event at River Hills Country Club April 5–6, by one shot with scores of 68-72 for a total of 140 (−2).

== Amateur wins ==
- 2007 The Amateur Championship

== Professional wins (6) ==
=== PGA Tour Canada wins (1) ===
| No. | Date | Tournament | Winning score | Margin of victory | Runners-up |
|---|---|---|---|---|---|
| 1 | May 31, 2015 | PC Financial Open | −12 (71-70-66-69=276) | Playoff | (Canada) Taylor Pendrith, (Canada) Adam Svensson, (Canada) Riley Wheeldon |

=== eGolf Professional Tour wins (5) ===
| No. | Date | Tournament | Winning score | Margin of victory | Runner(s)-up |
|---|---|---|---|---|---|
| 1 | Sep 24, 2010 | Caddy for a Cure Classic | −17 (64-68-67=199) | Playoff | (United States) Tadd Fujikawa, (Brazil) Fernando Mechereffe |
| 2 | May 18, 2012 | Willow Creek Open | −16 (65-68-67=200) | 1 stroke | (South Korea) Jin Jeong |
| 3 | Jul 14, 2012 | Southern Open | −17 (62-67-68-70=267) | Playoff | (Bermuda) Michael Sims |
| 4 | Aug 1, 2014 | Spring Creek Classic | −14 (67-66-69=202) | 1 stroke | (United States) Ryan Nelson |
| 5 | Apr 4, 2015 | The Championship at St. James | −12 (71-68-70-67=276) | 1 stroke | (United States) T. J. Howe |

== Results in major championships ==
| Tournament | 2007 | 2008 | 2009 |
|---|---|---|---|
| Masters Tournament | | CUT | |
| U.S. Open | | | T40 |
| The Open Championship | CUT | | |

Note: Weaver never played in the PGA Championship.

Did not play

CUT = missed the half-way cut
"T" = tied

== U.S. national team appearances ==
Amateur

- Walker Cup: 2009 (winners)
