= Jason Kokrak =

American professional golfer (born 1985)

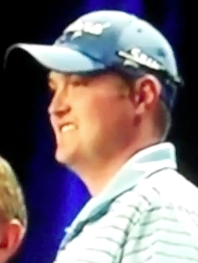
- Kokrak receiving his 2012 PGA Tour card

Personal information
- Full name: Jason Kenneth Kokrak
- Nationality: United States
- Born: May 22, 1985 (age 41) North Bay, Ontario, Canada
- Height: 6 ft 4 in (1.93 m)
- Weight: 225 lb (102 kg; 16.1 st)
- Spouse: Stephanie Mrofchak (m. 2015)
- Children: 2

Career
- Sport: Golf
- College: Xavier University
- Turned professional: 2008
- Current tour: LIV Golf
- Former tours: PGA Tour; Nationwide Tour eGolf Professional Tour
- Professional wins: 10
- Highest ranking: 20 (November 21, 2021) (as of October 25, 2026)

Number of wins by tour
- PGA Tour: 3
- Korn Ferry Tour: 2
- Other: 5

Best results in major championships
- Masters Tournament: T14: 2022
- PGA Championship: T19: 2018
- U.S. Open: T17: 2020
- The Open Championship: T26: 2021

Achievements and awards
- eGolf Professional Tour money list winner: 2010

Jason Kenneth Kokrak (born May 22, 1985) is an American professional golfer who plays in the LIV Golf League. Previously he played on the PGA Tour.

== Amateur career ==
Kokrak was born in North Bay, Ontario, Canada, and played high school golf at JFK High School in Warren, Ohio, where he twice led the Eagles to the Ohio state championship as Division III medalist. He went on to play college golf at Xavier University in Cincinnati and graduated in 2007. During his college career, he won both the 2006 and 2007 Ohio Amateur titles. Kokrak turned professional after graduation.

During the 2007 U.S. Amateur, Kokrak led all players with a score of 137 during the 36-hole match play qualifier at the Olympic Club in San Francisco. That same year, he made an appearance in the U.S. Open at Oakmont Country Club, when he successfully came through sectional and regional qualifying.

== Professional career ==
Kokrak has nine career professional victories, including four on the eGolf Professional Tour. In 2010, Kokrak won twice and was the leading money winner on the tour. During that same season, he made it to the final round of qualifying School, earning conditional status on the Nationwide Tour. In 2011, he won the Championship at St. James Plantation and the Donald Ross Championship. Kokrak finished second on the eGolf Tour's money list despite playing in only three events.

In September 2011, Kokrak won his first Nationwide Tour event, the Albertsons Boise Open in Boise, Idaho. His 72-hole score of 266 (−18) at Hillcrest Country Club included rounds of 68, 68, 63, and 67. Kokrak's third round 63 included consecutive birdies on holes one through six to open the round - one short of the Nationwide Tour record of seven. He won by two strokes and earned $130,500, which vaulted him from 70th to 13th place on the season's money list. Kokrak was an alternate and the last player to earn entry into the field.

On October 16, 2011, Kokrak notched his second Nationwide Tour victory within a month with a seven shot victory at the Miccosukee Championship with rounds of 63-66-69 and a final round 66. Kokrak was in the top 10 in the field in driving distance and putts per greens in regulation, and led the field in greens hit in regulation. The $108,000 first prize vaulted Kokrak to the fourth position on the Nationwide Tour money list and virtually assured 2012 status on the PGA Tour.

On October 30, 2011, Kokrak finished the season with a T5th at the Nationwide Tour Championship with rounds of 67, 67, 75 and 75. His winnings of $36,500 solidified him as the 4th leading money winner on the Nationwide Tour with total earnings of $338,092 in only 16 events. Kokrak was able to compete on the PGA Tour in 2012 as a result of his play in 2011.

Kokrak made his first appearance as a member of the PGA Tour on January 12, 2012, at the Sony Open in Hawaii, where he finished 75th. On February 12, 2012, Kokrak notched his first top-10 finish in his PGA Tour career at the AT&T Pebble Beach National Pro-Am with rounds of 68, 67, 72, and 70 for a 277 total, which gave him a 9th-place finish. He led the field in greens in regulation (GIR) with a 77% success rate and also led his Pro-Am team to an 11th-place finish. At the 2012 Frys.com Open, Kokrak finished in a tie for second, one stroke behind Jonas Blixt. For the week, he led the field in Greens in Regulation and was 9th in driving distance, averaging 309 yards on measured drives. His $440,000 in earnings for the week moved Kokrak up 50 positions to 117th on the PGA Tour money list, with two tournaments left in the 2012 season; moving him from no status for 2013 to a chance at keeping his Tour privileges. He would finish the season 119th on the money list.

Kokrak was featured in a four-page article, "The Making of a Bomber" in the March 5, 2012 issue of Golf World. The article cited Kokrak's development as a junior golfer, his teaching influences, and insights into his equipment specifications.

In February 2016, Kokrak opened with rounds of 68-64 for a 10-under-par total to hold the 36-hole lead at the Northern Trust Open by one stroke. This was the first time in his PGA Tour career he had held a 36-hole lead. He finished the tournament tied for second, one stroke behind Bubba Watson. This equalled his career best PGA Tour finish of a tie for second, which he also achieved back in 2012 at the Frys.com Open.

In March 2019, Kokrak finished tied for second at the Valspar Championship, one stroke behind champion Paul Casey. Kokrak's T-2 finish was his third career runner-up on Tour, and his first since the 2016 Northern Trust Open. Having made every cut since The Open Championship in July, 2018, he notched three top-10 finishes during the four-event PGA Tour Florida Swing in 2019.

On October 18, 2020, Kokrak won the CJ Cup at Shadow Creek for his first PGA Tour victory after nine years and 233 starts.

In May 2021, Kokrak won his second PGA Tour event at the Charles Schwab Challenge at Colonial Country Club in Fort Worth, Texas. Kokrak shot a final round 70 to defeat Jordan Spieth by two strokes. In November 2021, Kokrak won the Hewlett Packard Enterprise Houston Open at Memorial Park Municipal Golf Course in Houston, Texas. Kokrak shot a final round 65 to win by two strokes.

Kokrak joined LIV Golf in July 2022.

== Amateur wins ==
- 2006 Ohio Amateur
- 2007 Ohio Amateur

== Professional wins (11) ==
=== PGA Tour wins (3) ===
No.	Date	Tournament	Winning score	To par	Margin of victory	Runner(s)-up
1	Oct 18, 2020	CJ Cup	70-66-68-64=268	−20	2 strokes	(United States) Xander Schauffele
2	May 30, 2021	Charles Schwab Challenge	65-65-66-70=266	−14	2 strokes	(United States) Jordan Spieth
3	Nov 14, 2021	Hewlett Packard Enterprise Houston Open	68-71-66-65=270	−10	2 strokes	(United States) Scottie Scheffler, (United States) Kevin Tway

=== Nationwide Tour wins (2) ===
No.	Date	Tournament	Winning score	To par	Margin of victory	Runner-up
1	Sep 18, 2011	Albertsons Boise Open	68-68-63-67=266	−18	2 strokes	(United States) John Mallinger
2	Oct 16, 2011	Miccosukee Championship	63-66-69-66=264	−20	7 strokes	(United States) Mark Anderson

=== eGolf Professional Tour wins (4) ===
No.	Date	Tournament	Winning score	To par	Margin of victory	Runner(s)-up
1	Mar 20, 2010	Cabarrus Classic	69-69-69-66=273	−15	1 stroke	(United States) David Robinson
2	Jun 26, 2010	Bushnell Championship	63-66-70-67=266	−21	1 stroke	(United States) Tommy Biershenk, (United States) Chesson Hadley
3	Apr 16, 2011	The Championship at St. James Plantation	65-72-72-71=280	−8	1 stroke	(Canada) Matt Hill
4	May 28, 2011	Donald Ross Championship	68-61-66-67=262	−22	5 strokes	(United States) Scott Parel

=== Other wins (1) ===
No.	Date	Tournament	Winning score	To par	Margin of victory	Runners-up
1	Dec 12, 2021	QBE Shootout (with (United States) Kevin Na)	59-64-60=183	−33	1 stroke	(United States) Sam Burns and (United States) Billy Horschel

== Results in major championships ==
Results not in chronological order in 2020.

Tournament	2007	2008	2009
Masters Tournament			
U.S. Open	CUT		
The Open Championship			
PGA Championship			

Tournament	2010	2011	2012	2013	2014	2015	2016	2017	2018
Masters Tournament									
U.S. Open							T37	T53	
The Open Championship									CUT
PGA Championship				CUT	CUT		T49	T33	T19

Tournament	2019	2020	2021	2022	2023	2024	2025
Masters Tournament		CUT	49	T14	CUT		
PGA Championship	T23	CUT	T49	T60			
U.S. Open		T17	CUT	CUT			
The Open Championship	T32	NT	T26	T42			T40

Did not play

CUT = missed the half-way cut
T = tie for a place
NT = no tournament due to COVID-19 pandemic

=== Summary ===
Tournament	Wins	2nd	3rd	Top-5	Top-10	Top-25	Events	Cuts made
Masters Tournament	0	0	0	0	0	1	4	2
PGA Championship	0	0	0	0	0	2	9	6
U.S. Open	0	0	0	0	0	1	6	3
The Open Championship	0	0	0	0	0	0	5	4
Totals	0	0	0	0	0	4	24	15

- Most consecutive cuts made – 4 (2016 U.S. Open – 2017 PGA)
- Longest streak of top-10s – 0

== Results in The Players Championship ==
Tournament	2013	2014	2015	2016	2017	2018	2019	2020	2021	2022
The Players Championship	CUT	CUT	CUT	WD	CUT	T46	T47	C	T9	T53

Top 10

CUT = missed the halfway cut
WD = withdrew
T = tie for a place
C = Canceled after the first round due to the COVID-19 pandemic

== Results in World Golf Championships ==
Tournament	2016	2017	2018	2019	2020	2021	2022
Championship					T51	T9	
Match Play					NT^{1}	T42	T35
Invitational					T44	T34	
Champions	T16			T8	NT^{1}	NT^{1}	NT^{1}

^{1}Cancelled due to COVID-19 pandemic

Top 10
Did not play

NT = no tournament
T = tie for a place
Note that the Championship and Invitational were discontinued from 2022.

== See also ==
- 2011 Nationwide Tour graduates
