= Cody Gribble =

American golfer (born 1990)

Personal information
- Full name: William Cody Gribble
- Nationality: United States
- Born: September 20, 1990 (age 36) Dallas, Texas, U.S.
- Height: 5 ft 9 in (1.75 m)
- Weight: 165 lb (75 kg; 11.8 st)

Career
- Sport: Golf
- College: University of Texas
- Turned professional: 2013
- Current tours: PGA Tour (past champion status); Korn Ferry Tour
- Former tour: PGA Tour Latinoamérica
- Professional wins: 1

Number of wins by tour
- PGA Tour: 1

Best results in major championships
- Masters Tournament: DNP
- PGA Championship: T63: 2017
- U.S. Open: T21: 2014
- The Open Championship: DNP

William Cody Gribble (born September 20, 1990) is an American professional golfer who currently plays on the PGA Tour and the Korn Ferry Tour.

== Early years ==
Gribble was born in Dallas, Texas. He played college golf at the University of Texas and won the 2012 NCAA Championship with teammates Dylan Frittelli and Jordan Spieth. Gribble is a left-handed golfer.

== Professional career ==
In 2014, Gribble finished T8 at qualifying school to earn his Web.com Tour card, he finished 27th on the money list in 2015 failing to earn a PGA Tour card by $2,035, but retained his Web.com Tour card for another year. At the 2016 United Leasing & Finance Championship, Gribble was leading by one shot with two holes to play, but after a bogey-bogey finish, he ended the tournament T2, one shot behind eventual winner Séamus Power.

In October 2016, Gribble won his first PGA Tour title at the Sanderson Farms Championship, an alternate event on the PGA Tour. He shot a seven-under final round 65 to win by 4 strokes. Gribble became the 13th left-handed golfer to win a PGA Tour event and the first since Greg Chalmers won the 2016 Barracuda Championship.

Gribble gained media attention at the 2017 Arnold Palmer Invitational at Bay Hill when he tapped an alligator on the tail that was sunning itself on the 6th fairway during the first round of tournament play. The alligator quickly scampered unharmed into a nearby pond.

== Amateur wins ==
- 2007 Western Junior

== Professional wins (1) ==
=== PGA Tour wins (1) ===
No.	Date	Tournament	Winning score	To par	Margin of victory	Runners-up
1	Oct 30, 2016	Sanderson Farms Championship	73-63-67-65=268	−20	4 strokes	(United States) Chris Kirk, (United States) Luke List, (England) Greg Owen

== Results in major championships ==
Tournament	2014	2015	2016	2017	2018
Masters Tournament					
U.S. Open	T21	CUT			
The Open Championship					
PGA Championship				T63	

Tournament	2019
Masters Tournament	
PGA Championship	
U.S. Open	CUT
The Open Championship	

Did not play

CUT = missed the half-way cut
"T" = tied for place

== See also ==
- 2016 Web.com Tour Finals graduates
