= Chad Collins (golfer) =

American professional golfer (born 1978)

Personal information
- Full name: Chad Steven Collins
- Nationality: United States
- Born: September 20, 1978 (age 48) Indianapolis, Indiana, U.S.
- Height: 5 ft 9 in (1.75 m)
- Weight: 165 lb (75 kg; 11.8 st)

Career
- Sport: Golf
- College: Methodist College
- Turned professional: 2001
- Former tours: PGA Tour; Web.com Tour; NGA Hooters Tour
- Professional wins: 4

Number of wins by tour
- Korn Ferry Tour: 2
- Other: 2

Best results in major championships
- Masters Tournament: DNP
- PGA Championship: DNP
- U.S. Open: T40: 2006
- The Open Championship: DNP

Achievements and awards
- Hooters Tour Rookie of the Year: 2002

Chad Steven Collins (born September 20, 1978) is an American professional golfer.

== Early life and amateur career ==
Collins was born in Indianapolis, Indiana. He graduated from Methodist College in 2001 with a degree in Business Administration. While at Methodist, he won the NCAA Division III Championship as an individual three times (1998, 1999, and 2001) and as part of the team twice (1998 and 1999). He was a four-time first-team All-American (Div III) and four-time first-team All-USA South Athletic Conference. He won the USA South Athletic Conference championship in 1999 and was the co-champion in 2001. In 2001, he graduated.

== Professional career ==
In 2001, Collins turned professional. He played on the NGA Hooters Tour from 2002 to 2004, earning the Rookie of the Year in 2002. He won once in 2002 and once in 2003. Both wins came in the 'First City Championship,' in Savannah, Georgia.

Collins played on the Nationwide Tour from 2005 to 2007, winning the 2005 Henrico County Open. He finished 23rd on the money in 2007 to earn his PGA Tour card for 2008. He made only 12 of 24 cuts on the 2008 PGA Tour and lost his card. He returned to the Nationwide Tour in 2009, winning the Miccosukee Championship and finishing second on the money list to earn a return trip to the PGA Tour in 2010. He had a moderate season in 2010 and retained his PGA Tour card. 2011 was an injury plagued season for Collins. Fractured ribs forced him to shut down his schedule following the FedEx St. Jude Classic. Collins split the 2012 season between the PGA and Web.com Tours. He played on the PGA as a 'Major Medical Extension' but failed to make the cut in nine events and lost his PGA Tour card. He made the cut in three of eight Web.com events.

Collins was fully recovered and healthy in 2013. He made the cut in 12 of his 20 Web.com Tour events, featuring three T-3 finishes, an additional top-10 finish and four other top-25 finishes. During the second round of the 2013 Utah Championship, Collins shot a 60, just shy of the much heralded golf score of 59. That round included a front-nine score of 27 (tying the Web.com Tour record) He finished in a tie for 3rd in that tournament.

Collins finished 33rd on the 2013 Web.com Tour regular season money list, which qualified him for the Web.com Tour Finals, where he finished 25th to earn his PGA Tour card for 2014. His best finish since is a runner-up finish at the 2017 Barbasol Championship; in which he shot a 2nd round 60 to lead the event after 36-holes.

== Amateur wins ==
- 1997 Indiana (Boys) State Junior
- 1998 NCAA Division III Championship (individual)
- 1999 Dixie Intercollegiate Athletic Conference Championship (individual), NCAA Division III Championship (individual)
- 2000 Indiana State Amateur
- 2001 Dixie Intercollegiate Athletic Conference Championship (individual, tie), NCAA Division III Championship (individual)

== Professional wins (4) ==
=== Nationwide Tour wins (2) ===
| No. | Date | Tournament | Winning score | Margin of victory | Runner(s)-up |
|---|---|---|---|---|---|
| 1 | May 22, 2005 | Henrico County Open | −21 (65-69-66-67=267) | 2 strokes | (United States) Tom Scherrer |
| 2 | Oct 18, 2009 | Miccosukee Championship | −10 (69-66-69-70=274) | 2 strokes | (Australia) Won Joon Lee, (United States) Brian Smock, (United States) Justin Smith |

=== NGA Hooters Tour wins (2) ===
| No. | Date | Tournament | Winning score | Margin of victory | Runner-up |
|---|---|---|---|---|---|
| 1 | Jul 7, 2002 | First City Classic | −16 (67-63-65-69=264) | Playoff | (United States) Kevin Pendley |
| 2 | Mar 30, 2003 | First City Classic (2) | −6 (67-68-69-70=274) | 1 stroke | (United States) Kyle Kovacs |

== Results in major championships ==
| Tournament | 2006 | 2007 | 2008 | 2009 | 2010 | 2011 | 2012 | 2013 | 2014 |
|---|---|---|---|---|---|---|---|---|---|
| U.S. Open | T40 | | | | | | | | CUT |

Did not play

CUT = missed the half-way cut
"T" = tied
Note: Collins only played in the U.S. Open.

== See also ==
- 2007 Nationwide Tour graduates
- 2009 Nationwide Tour graduates
- 2013 Web.com Tour Finals graduates
- 2014 Web.com Tour Finals graduates
- 2017 Web.com Tour Finals graduates
