= Roberto Castro =

American professional golfer (born 1985)

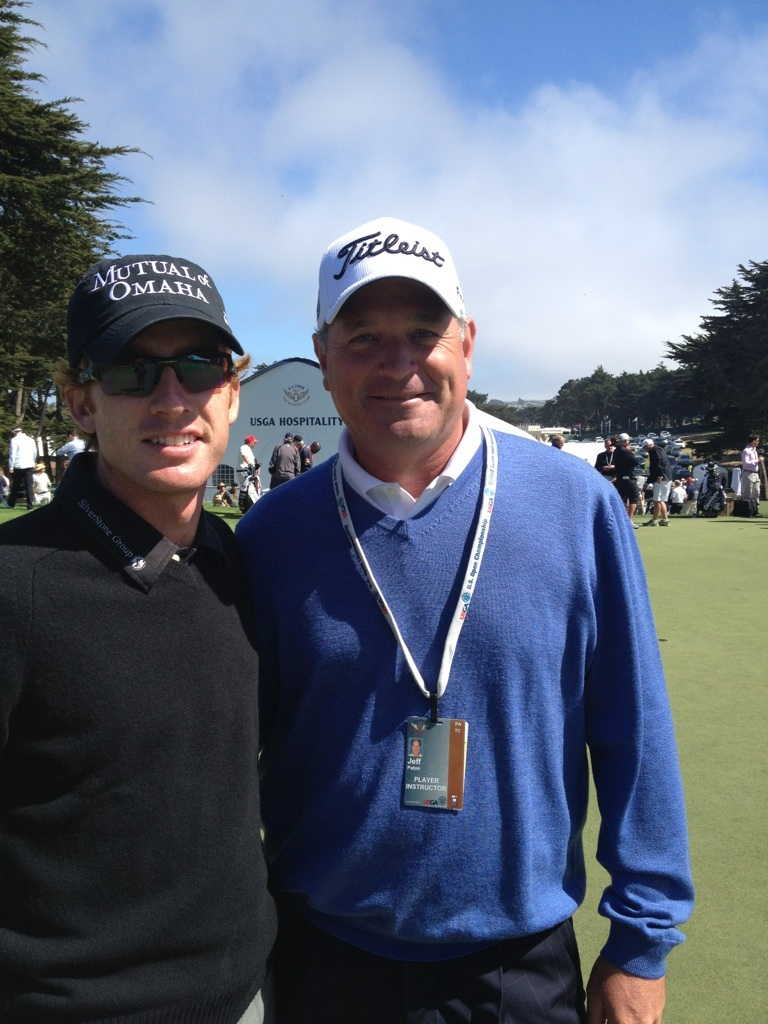
- Castro with his coach

Personal information
- Full name: Roberto Mario Castro
- Nationality: United States
- Born: June 23, 1985 (age 41) Houston, Texas, U.S.
- Height: 5 ft 11 in (1.80 m)
- Weight: 168 lb (76 kg; 12.0 st)
- Spouse: Katie Castro (m. 2013)

Career
- Sport: Golf
- College: Georgia Tech
- Turned professional: 2007
- Former tours: PGA Tour; Korn Ferry Tour eGolf Professional Tour
- Professional wins: 6
- Highest ranking: 64 (October 20, 2013)

Best results in major championships
- Masters Tournament: CUT: 2014, 2017
- PGA Championship: T12: 2013
- U.S. Open: CUT: 2012, 2014, 2015, 2017, 2018, 2019
- The Open Championship: CUT: 2014, 2017

Achievements and awards
- Byron Nelson Award: 2007

Roberto Mario Castro (born June 23, 1985) is an American professional golfer who plays on the PGA Tour.

== Amateur career ==
Castro played college golf at Georgia Tech. While at Georgia Tech, he was named first-team All-American in 2005, second-team All-American in 2007, and honorable mention All-American in 2004 and 2006. Castro was named to the All-Atlantic Coast Conference (ACC) team every year during his four years at Georgia Tech and was named ACC Rookie of the Year in 2004. He won one collegiate event, the 2007 Puerto Rico Classic. He won the 2007 Byron Nelson Award, which was given to the nation's top senior golfer.

In 2005, Castro was the captain of the United States Palmer Cup team that defeated Europe 14–10. He was also a member of the 2006 team that lost 19½–4½.

In 2008 Castro was awarded the prestigious NCAA Top VIII Award.

== Professional career ==
Castro played on the eGolf Professional Tour from 2007 to 2010 and won five events during that time. He played in 12 events on the Nationwide Tour in 2010 and recorded a runner-up finish at the Preferred Health Systems Wichita Open. His first full year on the Nationwide Tour came in 2011 where he recorded four top-10 finishes and placed 23rd on the money list, good enough for a PGA Tour card for 2012. He also tied for 13th at qualifying School, improving his status. On May 9, 2013, Castro shot a 63 on the opening day of The Players Championship to equal the course record set by Fred Couples (1992) and Greg Norman (1994). He had his best finish on the PGA Tour in June 2013, when Castro finished as runner-up, three strokes behind Bill Haas at the AT&T National. He finished 2nd again in 2016 after losing in a playoff at the Wells Fargo Championship against James Hahn.

== Personal life ==
Castro was born in Houston, Texas. His father is from Peru and his mother is from Costa Rica. Castro is the nephew of former LPGA Tour golfer Jenny Lidback. Castro has two younger brothers, both of whom also played collegiate golf. Alex Castro played for Georgia State University from 2007 to 2011 and youngest brother Franco began his career at LSU before transferring to the University of North Carolina at Charlotte in 2012. Castro and his wife Katie reside in Atlanta, Georgia, with their two daughters. He is a member of the Ansley Golf Club.

== Amateur wins ==
- 2001 AJGA Greater Greensboro Chrysler Junior

== Professional wins (6) ==
=== eGolf Professional Tour wins (5) ===
No.	Date	Tournament	Winning score	To par	Margin of victory	Runner(s)-up
1	Jun 28, 2007	Spring Creek Classic	67-68-67=202	−14	3 strokes	(United States) Andy Bare
2	Jul 18, 2008	River Hills Open	69-66-68=203	−13	4 strokes	(United States) Joel Hendry
3	Jun 27, 2009	Spring Creek Championship	69-65-70-68=272	−16	2 strokes	(United States) Blaine Peffley
4	Aug 29, 2009	The Championship at Savannah Harbor	65-66-69-69=269	−19	1 stroke	(United States) Matt Davidson
5	Feb 26, 2010	Savannah Quarters Classic	70-69-70=209	−7	1 stroke	(United States) William McGirt, (United States) Scott Parel

=== Other wins (1) ===
- 2009 Georgia Open

== Playoff record ==
PGA Tour playoff record (0–1)

No.	Year	Tournament	Opponent	Result
1	2016	Wells Fargo Championship	(United States) James Hahn	Lost to par on first extra hole

== Results in major championships ==
Tournament	2012	2013	2014	2015	2016	2017	2018
Masters Tournament			CUT			CUT	
U.S. Open	CUT		CUT	CUT		CUT	CUT
The Open Championship			CUT			CUT	
PGA Championship		T12	CUT		T66		

Tournament	2019
Masters Tournament	
PGA Championship	
U.S. Open	CUT
The Open Championship	

Did not play

CUT = missed the half-way cut
"T" = tied

=== Summary ===
Tournament	Wins	2nd	3rd	Top-5	Top-10	Top-25	Events	Cuts made
Masters Tournament	0	0	0	0	0	0	2	0
PGA Championship	0	0	0	0	0	1	3	2
U.S. Open	0	0	0	0	0	0	6	0
The Open Championship	0	0	0	0	0	0	2	0
Totals	0	0	0	0	0	1	13	2

- Most consecutive cuts made – 1 (twice)
- Longest streak of top-10s – 0

== Results in The Players Championship ==
Tournament	2013	2014	2015	2016	2017
The Players Championship	T19	CUT			T56

Did not play

CUT = missed the halfway cut
"T" indicates a tie for a place

== Results in World Golf Championships ==
Results not in chronological order before 2015.

Tournament	2014	2015	2016	2017
Championship	T58			T45
Match Play				
Invitational				
Champions			T30	

Did not play

QF, R16, R32, R64 = Round in which player lost in match play
"T" = Tied

== U.S. national team appearances ==
Amateur

- Palmer Cup: 2005 (winners), 2006

== See also ==
- 2011 Nationwide Tour graduates
- 2011 PGA Tour Qualifying School graduates
- 2015 Web.com Tour Finals graduates
- 2018 Web.com Tour Finals graduates
