= Matt Hendrix =

American professional golfer (born 1981)

Personal information
- Full name: James Matthew Hendrix
- Nationality: United States
- Born: January 22, 1981 (age 45) Aiken, South Carolina, U.S.
- Height: 6 ft 0 in (1.83 m)
- Weight: 200 lb (91 kg; 14 st)

Career
- Sport: Golf
- College: Clemson University
- Turned professional: 2004
- Former tours: PGA Tour; Web.com Tour eGolf Professional Tour
- Professional wins: 3

James Matthew Hendrix (born January 22, 1981) is an American professional golfer who plays on the Web.com Tour and played as a member of the PGA Tour during the 2007 season.

== Amateur career ==
Hendrix was born in Aiken, South Carolina. He qualified for the 1997 U.S. Junior Amateur, was the top rated junior golfer in South Carolina, and won the 2003 Sunnehanna Amateur. He played on the 2003 Walker Cup team. He played college golf at Clemson University and was a member of the team that won the 2003 NCAA Championship and Atlantic Coast Conference Championship.

== Professional career ==
Hendrix turned professional in 2004. He finished T29 at the 2006 Q School, earning his PGA Tour card for the 2007 season. He did not finish high enough on the money list to retain his PGA Tour card past the 2007 season.

Hendrix spent the 2006, 2011, and 2012 seasons on the Nationwide Tour.

Hendrix has two wins on the NGA Pro Golf Tour.

== Professional wins (3) ==
=== eGolf Professional Tour wins (1) ===
No.	Date	Tournament	Winning score	Margin of victory	Runner-up
1	Feb 17, 2013	Palmetto Hall Championship	−15 (68-67-67-71=273)	5 strokes	(United States) Derek Rende

=== Other wins (2) ===
- 2011 Brunswick Plantation, Legends Parkland (NGA/Hooters Tour Carolina Winter Series)

== U.S. national team appearances ==
Amateur

- Walker Cup: 2003

== See also ==
- 2006 PGA Tour Qualifying School graduates
