= David Mathis =

American professional golfer

Personal information
- Full name: David Haynes Mathis
- Nationality: United States
- Born: February 22, 1974 (age 52) Winston-Salem, North Carolina, U.S.
- Height: 6 ft 0 in (1.83 m)
- Weight: 178 lb (81 kg; 12.7 st)

Career
- Sport: Golf
- College: Campbell University
- Turned professional: 1997
- Current tour: PGA Tour
- Former tours: Nationwide Tour; Canadian Tour; Tarheel Tour
- Professional wins: 6

Number of wins by tour
- Korn Ferry Tour: 2
- Other: 4

Best results in major championships
- Masters Tournament: DNP
- PGA Championship: DNP
- U.S. Open: CUT: 2012
- The Open Championship: DNP

David Haynes Mathis (born February 22, 1974) is an American professional golfer.

== Career ==
Mathis was born in Winston-Salem, North Carolina. He played college golf at Campbell University. He turned professional in 1997.

Mathis played on the mini-tours and then on the Canadian Tour from 2001 to 2005. He played on the Nationwide Tour from 2006 to 2008, winning once at the 2008 BMW Charity Pro-Am and earning his PGA Tour card for 2009. He played the PGA Tour in 2009 but did not earn enough to retain his card. He played the Nationwide Tour again in 2010, winning again at the Winn-Dixie Jacksonville Open and finishing 13th on the money list to regain his PGA Tour card for 2011.

== Professional wins (6) ==
=== Nationwide Tour wins (2) ===
No.	Date	Tournament	Winning score	Margin of victory	Runner(s)-up
1	May 18, 2008	BMW Charity Pro-Am	−20 (65-65-68-68=266)	3 strokes	(United States) Roger Tambellini
2	Oct 24, 2010	Winn-Dixie Jacksonville Open	−8 (68-63-72-69=272)	1 stroke	(United States) Jeff Curl, (Australia) Won Joon Lee, (United States) Kyle Reifers

=== Canadian Tour wins (1) ===
No.	Date	Tournament	Winning score	Margin of victory	Runners-up
1	May 14, 2005	Michelin Morelia Classic	−10 (71-67-69-64=271)	1 stroke	(Canada) Chris Baryla, (United States) Michael Walton

=== Tarheel Tour wins (3) ===
No.	Date	Tournament	Winning score	Margin of victory	Runner-up
1	Jun 3, 2004	Multiple Directory Service Classic	−10 (71-67-68=206)	2 strokes	(United States) Kevin Taylor
2	Nov 5, 2004	Stonebridge Classic	−11 (67-70-68=205)	1 stroke	(Australia) Andrew Tshudin
3	Apr 5, 2007	River Run Classic	−9 (68-70-69=207)	2 strokes	(South Africa) Justin Walters

== See also ==
- 2008 Nationwide Tour graduates
- 2010 Nationwide Tour graduates
