= EGolf Professional Tour =

Professional golf tour

eGolf Professional Tour
- Formerly: Tarheel Tour; NGA Hooters Tarheel Tour
- Sport: Golf
- Founded: 2002
- Founder: David Siegel; Paul Wortham
- First season: 2002
- Folded: 2015
- Countries: Based in North Carolina (Note: Schedules also included events in Georgia, Mississippi, Morocco, Nevada, South Carolina and Virginia.)
- Most titles: Money list titles: (United States) Matt Cannon (4); Tournament wins: (United States) Matt Cannon (19)
- Website: http://www.egolfprofessionaltour.com/

The eGolf Professional Tour, formerly the Tarheel Tour, was a third-level men's professional golf tour based in Charlotte, North Carolina. It was founded in 2002 and ran through 2015, holding around twenty tournaments each year in the states of North Carolina, South Carolina, Virginia and Georgia. Having been acquired by Golf Interact, following the 2015 season, the tour was merged into the SwingThought Tour, formerly known as the NGA Hooters Tour.

== History ==
The Tarheel Tour was founded in 2002 by Paul Wortham and David Siegel. It was purchased by Five Oaks Capital in August 2008 and renamed the eGolf Professional Tour the following year. In August 2015, the eGolf Tour was bought by Golf Interact and was integrated into the SwingThought Tour, formerly known as the NGA Hooters Tour.

As a development tour, the eGolf Professional Tour was designed to be a stepping stone for players trying to ascend to higher-level tours. Many players who played on the tour went on to play on the second tier Web.com Tour, and a few have reached the top level on the PGA Tour: Jason Kokrak, Peter Malnati, Grayson Murray, Will MacKenzie, Steve Marino, Jason Bohn, Tommy Gainey, Matt Bettencourt, David Mathis, Seamus Power, William McGirt, and Roberto Castro.

== Money list winners ==
Year	Winner	Prize money (US$)
2015	(United States) Frank Adams III (2)	58,385
2014	(United States) Ryan Nelson	112,851
2013	(United States) Frank Adams III	69,965
2012	(United States) Drew Weaver	121,737
2011	(United States) Corey Nagy	89,607
2010	(United States) Jason Kokrak	115,225
2009	(United States) Scott Brown	142,362
2008	(United States) David Robinson	106,645
2007	(United States) Matt Cannon (4)	81,724
2006	(United States) Dustin Bray	63,168
2005	(United States) David Sanchez	36,038
2004	(United States) Matt Cannon (3)	43,648
2003	(United States) Matt Cannon (2)	26,685
2002	(United States) Matt Cannon	26,557
