= NGA Pro Golf Tour =

US developmental professional golf tour

- Formerly: U.S. Golf Tour; T. C. Jordan Tour; Hooters Tour; NGA Hooters Tour; NGA Pro Golf Tour; SwingThought Tour
- Sport: Golf
- Founded: 1988
- Founder: T. C. "Rick" Jordan
- First season: 1989
- Country: Based in the United States
- Most titles: Money list titles: (United States) Chad Campbell (2) (United States) Ted Potter Jr. (2); Tournament wins: (United States) Chad Campbell (13)
- Related competitions: eGolf Professional Tour; Gateway Tour; Web.com Tour

The NGA Pro Golf Tour was a developmental golf tour based in the United States. The tour consisted of around 25 professional golf tournaments, making it the third largest series in the United States after the elite PGA Tour and its developmental series, the Korn Ferry Tour.

== History ==
The Pro Golf Tour (PGT) was founded in 1987 by Aytch Johnson, and financed by T. C. "Rick" Jordan. Midway through its first full season in 1988, Jordan withdrew his money citing financial irregularities, and the tour folded.

In late 1988, Jordan founded the U.S. Golf Tour (USGT), which launched its first season in 1989. During the 1991 season, it became known as the T. C. Jordan Tour. In 1994, the involvement of Hooters restaurant chain owner Robert H. Brooks, who later become majority owner of the tour, saw Hooters become the title sponsor, with the tour branded as the Hooters Jordan Tour. The following year, a 20-year sponsorship deal was agreed. With the sanctioning of the National Golf Association, the tour was titled as the NGA Hooters Tour. On Brooks death in 2006, tour president Robin Waters acquired his majority stake in the tour. Hooters ended their sponsorship following the 2011 season and the tour became known as the NGA Pro Golf Tour.

Following the PGA Tour's acquisition of the Canadian Tour and the Tour de las Américas in 2012, the NGA Pro Golf Tour began to suffer due to those tours then offering direct promotion to the PGA Tour's second tier Web.com Tour. As membership and tournament entries decreased, guaranteed prize money was reduced, and then withdrawn in 2014. In August 2014, the tour was acquired by Golf Interact, who rebranded it as the SwingThought Tour. The following year, Golf Interact purchased the eGolf Professional Tour and integrated it into the SwingThought Tour.

== Leading money winners ==
Year	Winner	Prize money (US$)	Ref.
2014	(United States) Dominic Bozzelli	72,658	
2013	(United States) Jon Curran	102,965	
2012	(United States) Brandon Brown	115,904	
2011	(United States) Jeff Corr	159,199	
2010	(United States) Michael Thompson	111,817	
2009	(United States) Ted Potter Jr. (2)	202,517	
2008	(England) David Skinns	134,809	
2007	(United States) Casey Wittenberg	122,881	
2006	(United States) Ted Potter Jr.	102,609	
2005	(United States) Dave Schreyer	86,682	
2004	(United States) Elliot Gealy	137,704	
2003	(United States) Jake Reeves	129,921	
2002	(United States) Michael Connell	76,304	
2001	(United States) Zach Johnson	126,408	
2000	(United States) Chad Campbell (2)	188,280	
1999			
1998	(United States) Chad Campbell	185,431	
1997	(United States) Steve Ford	184,314	
