= 2005 Players Championship =

Tournament information
- Dates: March 24–28, 2005
- Location: Ponte Vedra Beach, Florida; 30.198°N 81.394°W
- Courses: TPC Sawgrass, Stadium Course
- Tour: PGA Tour

Statistics
- Par: 72
- Length: 7,093 yards (6,486 m)
- Field: 146 players, 84 after cut
- Cut: 143 (−1)
- Prize fund: $8.0 million
- Winner's share: $1.44 million

Champion
- (United States) Fred Funk
- 279 (−9)

Location map
- Location in the United States Location in Florida

The 2005 Players Championship was a golf tournament in Florida on the PGA Tour, held March 24–28 at TPC Sawgrass in Ponte Vedra Beach, southeast of Jacksonville. It was the 32nd Players Championship.

== Tournament summary ==
Fred Funk became the oldest champion at age 48, one stroke ahead of runners-up Luke Donald, Tom Lehman, and Scott Verplank. Because of numerous weather delays, the second round was completed on Sunday, the third on Monday morning, followed by the final round. Funk played 32 holes on Monday in blustery conditions.

Defending champion Adam Scott finished four strokes back, in a tie for eighth place.

== Venue ==
This was the 24th Players Championship held at the TPC at Sawgrass Stadium Course and it remained at 7,093 yards (6,486 m).

== Eligibility requirements ==
Winners of PGA Tour co-sponsored or approved tournaments, whose victories are considered official, since the previous year's Players Championship.

Zach Johnson, Phil Mickelson, Stewart Cink, Vijay Singh, Joey Sindelar, Sergio García, Steve Flesch, David Toms, Ernie Els, Retief Goosen, Adam Scott, Stephen Ames, Mark Hensby, Todd Hamilton, Jonathan Byrd, Carlos Franco, Rod Pampling, Vaughn Taylor, Woody Austin, Bart Bryant, Fred Funk, Andre Stolz, Brent Geiberger, Ryan Palmer, Stuart Appleby, Justin Leonard, Tiger Woods, Geoff Ogilvy, Pádraig Harrington, Kenny Perry

The top 125 finishers on the 2004 Official PGA Tour money list.

Davis Love III, Chris DiMarco, Mike Weir, Rory Sabbatini, Jerry Kelly, Scott Verplank, John Daly, Shigeki Maruyama, Chad Campbell, K. J. Choi, Jay Haas, Darren Clarke, Tim Herron, Charles Howell III, Jonathan Kaye, Luke Donald, Ted Purdy, Kirk Triplett, Bo Van Pelt, Jesper Parnevik, Jeff Maggert, Robert Allenby, Duffy Waldorf, Tom Pernice Jr., Harrison Frazar, Joe Ogilvie, Fred Couples, Carl Pettersson, Arron Oberholser, Tom Lehman, Alex Čejka, Craig Parry, Chris Riley, Frank Lickliter, Freddie Jacobson, Justin Rose, Patrick Sheehan, Skip Kendall, Tim Petrovic, Stephen Leaney, Briny Baird, Tim Clark, Heath Slocum, Thomas Bjørn, Bob Estes, Brad Faxon, Jeff Sluman, Loren Roberts, Bob Tway, Joe Durant, Shaun Micheel, Bernhard Langer, Kevin Sutherland, Brian Bateman, Kevin Na, Michael Allen, Corey Pavin, John Huston, Tom Byrum, Dudley Hart, J. J. Henry, Todd Fischer, Tommy Armour III, Lee Janzen, Brett Quigley, Matt Gogel, Hank Kuehne, Hunter Mahan, J. L. Lewis, Nick Price, Hidemichi Tanaka, Scott McCarron, José Cóceres, Cameron Beckman, Daniel Chopra, John Rollins, Robert Gamez, Pat Perez, Mark Calcavecchia, Neal Lancaster, John Senden, Chris Smith, Jim Furyk, Dennis Paulson, Peter Lonard, Kent Jones, Jay Williamson, Stephen Allan, Brian Gay, Aaron Baddeley, Billy Andrade, Tag Ridings

For the duration of their exemption, PGA Tour members who earned a Tournament Winner exemption prior to March 1, 2004.

Steve Lowery, Len Mattiace, Peter Jacobsen

Winners of the Players Championship, Masters, U.S. Open, British Open, and PGA Championship from 1995 to 1997 and from 2000 to 2004. Beginning with 1998, winners will be eligible for five years.

Steve Elkington, Nick Faldo, Steve Jones, Mark Brooks, Hal Sutton, Craig Perks, David Duval, Rich Beem, Ben Curtis

Winners of the NEC World Series of Golf in the last 10 years (1995–1997).

Winners of the Tour Championship in the last three years (2002–2004).

Winners of the WGC-Accenture Match Play Championship in the last three years (2002–2004).

Winners of the WGC-NEC Invitational and WGC-American Express Championship in the last three years (2002–2004).

Any player(s), not otherwise eligible, among the top 50 leaders from the Official World Golf Ranking through the Bay Hill Invitational.

Miguel Ángel Jiménez, Lee Westwood, Ángel Cabrera, Nick O'Hern, Paul Casey, Graeme McDowell, Ian Poulter, David Howell, Richard Green

Any player(s), not otherwise eligible, among the top 10 leaders from the 2005 Official PGA Tour Money List through the Bay Hill Invitational.

If necessary to complete a field of 144 players, PGA Tour members from the 2005 Official PGA Tour money list below 10th position through the Bay Hill Invitational, in order of their positions on such list.

Tom Gillis, Robert Damron, Craig Barlow

The Players Championship Committee may invite a player(s), not otherwise eligible, who is a current inductee of World Golf Hall of Fame. (Note: Such a player would be added to the field.)

== Round summaries ==
=== First round ===
Thursday, March 24, 2005

Place	Player	Score	To par
1	(United States) Steve Jones	64	−8
T2	(United States) Fred Funk	65	−7
T2	(United States) Zach Johnson	65	−7
T2	(England) Lee Westwood	65	−7
T5	(England) Luke Donald	66	−6
T5	(Spain) Sergio García	66	−6
T5	(United States) J. L. Lewis	66	−6
T8	(United States) Bob Estes	67	−5
T8	(Republic of Ireland) Pádraig Harrington	67	−5
T8	(United States) Brett Quigley	67	−5
T8	(Fiji) Vijay Singh	67	−5
T8	(United States) Bob Tway	67	−5

=== Second round ===
Friday, March 25, 2005
Saturday, March 26, 2005
Sunday, March 27, 2005

Place	Player	Score	To par
T1	(England) Luke Donald	66-68=134	−10
T1	(United States) Joe Durant	69-65=134	−10
T1	(United States) Tim Herron	68-66=134	−10
T1	(England) Lee Westwood	65-69=134	−10
5	(United States) Zach Johnson	65-70=135	−9
6	(United States) Kirk Triplett	70-66=136	−8
T7	(United States) Fred Funk	65-72=137	−7
T7	(United States) Dudley Hart	70-67=137	−7
T7	(Northern Ireland) Graeme McDowell	71-66=137	−7
T7	(Australia) Adam Scott	69-68=137	−7
T7	(United States) Vaughn Taylor	70-67=137	−7

=== Third round ===
Sunday, March 27, 2005
Monday, March 28, 2005

Place	Player	Score	To par
1	(England) Luke Donald	66-68-70=204	−12
2	(United States) Joe Durant	69-65-71=205	−11
3	(United States) Tim Herron	68-66-72=206	−10
4	(United States) Zach Johnson	65-70-72=207	−9
T5	(United States) Fred Funk	65-72-71=208	−8
T5	(South Africa) Retief Goosen	69-70-69=208	−8
T5	(United States) Rod Pampling	70-70-68=208	−8
T8	(Australia) Steve Elkington	72-66-71=209	−7
T8	(Australia) Craig Parry	68-70-71=209	−7
T10	(Germany) Alex Čejka	70-70-70=210	−6
T10	(United States) Jay Haas	69-69-72=210	−6
T10	(Zimbabwe) Nick Price	71-70-69=210	−6
T10	(Australia) Adam Scott	69-68-73=210	−6
T10	(United States) Vaughn Taylor	70-67-73=210	−6
T10	(United States) Scott Verplank	71-67-72=210	−6

=== Final round ===
Monday, March 28, 2005

Champion
(c) = past champion

Place	Player	Score	To par	Money ($)
1	(United States) Fred Funk	65-72-71-71=279	−9	1,440,000
T2	(England) Luke Donald	66-68-70-76=280	−8	597,333
T2	(United States) Tom Lehman	71-69-72-68=280	−8	597,333
T2	(United States) Scott Verplank	71-67-72-70=280	−8	597,333
5	(United States) Joe Durant	69-65-71-76=281	−7	320,000
T6	(Australia) Steve Elkington (c)	72-66-71-73=282	−6	278,000
T6	(United States) Tim Herron	68-66-72-76=282	−6	278,000
T8	(United States) Zach Johnson	65-70-72-76=283	−5	224,000
T8	(United States) J. L. Lewis	66-77-70-70=283	−5	224,000
T8	(United States) Davis Love III (c)	72-66-74-71=283	−5	224,000
T8	(Australia) Adam Scott (c)	69-68-73-73=283	−5	224,000

Leaderboard below the top 10
Place	Player	Score	To par	Money ($)
T12	(United States) Mark Calcavecchia	71-70-72-71=284	−4	156,800
T12	(Germany) Alex Čejka	70-70-70-74=284	−4	156,800
T12	(South Africa) Retief Goosen	69-70-69-76=284	−4	156,800
T12	(United States) Steve Lowery	69-74-72-69=284	−4	156,800
T12	(Fiji) Vijay Singh	67-74-71-72=284	−4	156,800
T17	(South Africa) Ernie Els	71-71-74-69=285	−3	112,000
T17	(United States) Bob Estes	67-73-73-72=285	−3	112,000
T17	(United States) Joey Sindelar	70-71-70-74=285	−3	112,000
T17	(United States) Kirk Triplett	70-66-76-73=285	−3	112,000
T17	(Canada) Mike Weir	74-68-69-74=285	−3	112,000
T22	(Australia) John Senden	74-69-70-73=286	−2	86,400
T22	(England) Lee Westwood	65-69-80-72=286	−2	86,400
T24	(United States) Jay Haas	69-69-72-77=287	−1	70,400
T24	(Australia) Nick O'Hern	76-65-72-74=287	−1	70,400
T24	(United States) Brett Quigley	67-73-78-69=287	−1	70,400
T27	(United States) Michael Allen	71-71-70-76=288	E	56,800
T27	(England) Nick Faldo	71-70-74-73=288	E	56,800
T27	(United States) Arron Oberholser	73-68-72-75=288	E	56,800
T27	(Australia) Rod Pampling	70-70-68-80=288	E	56,800
T27	(United States) Tim Petrovic	71-71-71-75=288	E	56,800
T32	(United States) Jonathan Byrd	73-68-73-75=289	+1	42,400
T32	(United States) Stewart Cink	70-68-73-78=289	+1	42,400
T32	(Spain) Sergio García	66-75-70-78=289	+1	42,400
T32	(Japan) Shigeki Maruyama	70-68-76-75=289	+1	42,400
T32	(United States) Joe Ogilvie	72-67-72-78=289	+1	42,400
T32	(United States) Pat Perez	70-70-72-77=289	+1	42,400
T32	(Zimbabwe) Nick Price (c)	71-70-69-79=289	+1	42,400
T32	(United States) Vaughn Taylor	70-67-73-79=289	+1	42,400
T40	(Sweden) Daniel Chopra	68-70-73-79=290	+2	30,400
T40	(United States) Hunter Mahan	68-75-70-77=290	+2	30,400
T40	(Northern Ireland) Graeme McDowell	71-66-74-79=290	+2	30,400
T40	(United States) Phil Mickelson	70-68-77-75=290	+2	30,400
T40	(Australia) Craig Parry	68-70-71-81=290	+2	30,400
T40	(United States) Duffy Waldorf	72-69-72-77=290	+2	30,400
T46	(United States) Tom Byrum	72-71-75-73=291	+3	21,394
T46	(United States) Brad Faxon	72-69-73-77=291	+3	21,394
T46	(Australia) Richard Green (golfer)	75-68-71-77=291	+3	21,394
T46	(Spain) Miguel Ángel Jiménez	70-69-82-70=291	+3	21,394
T46	(United States) Jeff Maggert	70-71-71-79=291	+3	21,394
T46	(Sweden) Jesper Parnevik	69-71-72-79=291	+3	21,394
T46	(United States) Jeff Sluman	71-67-75-78=291	+3	21,394
T53	(United States) Jonathan Kaye	72-69-77-75=293	+5	18,613
T53	(United States) Heath Slocum	70-72-74-77=293	+5	18,613
T53	(United States) Tiger Woods (c)	70-73-75-75=293	+5	18,613
T56	(United States) Tommy Armour III	70-73-74-77=294	+6	17,760
T56	(United States) Briny Baird	68-73-75-78=294	+6	17,760
T56	(United States) Brian Bateman	71-71-75-77=294	+6	17,760
T56	(United States) Robert Gamez	68-75-69-82=294	+6	17,760
T56	(United States) Ted Purdy	69-74-72-79=294	+6	17,760
T56	(United States) Bob Tway	67-71-80-76=294	+6	17,760
T56	(United States) Jay Williamson	72-68-77-77=294	+6	17,760
T63	(United States) Craig Barlow	73-70-73-79=295	+7	16,800
T63	(Northern Ireland) Darren Clarke	73-70-73-79=295	+7	16,800
T63	(United States) Robert Damron	72-71-76-76=295	+7	16,800
T63	(Republic of Ireland) Pádraig Harrington	67-73-77-78=295	+7	16,800
T63	(United States) Dudley Hart	70-67-76-82=295	+7	16,800
T68	(United States) Lee Janzen (c)	73-69-74-80=296	+8	16,160
T68	(United States) Kevin Sutherland	72-70-74-80=296	+8	16,160
T68	(United States) David Toms	70-71-73-82=296	+8	16,160
T71	(United States) Len Mattiace	72-71-76-78=297	+9	15,760
T71	(United States) Shaun Micheel	68-74-72-83=297	+9	15,760
T73	(United States) Cameron Beckman	74-69-73-82=298	+10	15,440
T73	(Australia) Mark Hensby	72-70-76-80=298	+10	15,440
T75	(United States) Brian Gay	71-72-74-82=299	+11	15,040
T75	(United States) Kent Jones	74-68-75-82=299	+11	15,040
T75	(United States) Steve Jones	64-77-74-84=299	+11	15,040
78	(Australia) Aaron Baddeley	73-69-80-78=300	+12	14,720
T79	(United States) Steve Flesch	72-71-78-81=302	+14	14,480
T79	(United States) Frank Lickliter	72-71-73-86=302	+14	14,480
81	(Argentina) José Cóceres	73-70-78-82=303	+15	14,240
82	(United States) Tag Ridings	72-71-82-79=304	+16	14,080
CUT	(Australia) Robert Allenby	75-69=144	E	
CUT	(United States) Mark Brooks	70-74=144	E	
CUT	(Argentina) Ángel Cabrera	73-71=144	E	
CUT	(United States) Chad Campbell	72-72=144	E	
CUT	(United States) Jim Furyk	74-70=144	E	
CUT	(United States) J. J. Henry	72-72=144	E	
CUT	(United States) Charles Howell III	72-72=144	E	
CUT	(United States) John Huston	73-71=144	E	
CUT	(United States) Peter Jacobsen	70-74=144	E	
CUT	(Germany) Bernhard Langer	75-69=144	E	
CUT	(United States) Corey Pavin	69-75=144	E	
CUT	(United States) Tom Pernice Jr.	73-71=144	E	
CUT	(Sweden) Carl Pettersson	73-71=144	E	
CUT	(England) Justin Rose	77-67=144	E	
CUT	(United States) Chris Smith	73-71=144	E	
CUT	(Trinidad and Tobago) Stephen Ames	71-74=145	+1	
CUT	(England) Paul Casey	74-71=145	+1	
CUT	(United States) Ben Curtis	72-73=145	+1	
CUT	(United States) John Daly	73-72=145	+1	
CUT	(United States) Tom Gillis	74-71=145	+1	
CUT	(United States) Matt Gogel	75-70=145	+1	
CUT	(United States) Kenny Perry	74-71=145	+1	
CUT	(United States) Loren Roberts	74-71=145	+1	
CUT	(South Africa) Rory Sabbatini	75-70=145	+1	
CUT	(United States) Fred Couples (c)	74-72=146	+2	
CUT	(United States) Todd Fischer	70-76=146	+2	
CUT	(United States) Jerry Kelly	71-75=146	+2	
CUT	(United States) Skip Kendall	73-73=146	+2	
CUT	(Australia) Peter Lonard	73-73=146	+2	
CUT	(United States) Bo Van Pelt	75-71=146	+2	
CUT	(United States) Bart Bryant	72-75=147	+3	
CUT	(South Korea) K. J. Choi	73-74=147	+3	
CUT	(South Africa) Tim Clark	77-70=147	+3	
CUT	(United States) Chris DiMarco	73-74=147	+3	
CUT	(England) David Howell	74-73=147	+3	
CUT	(New Zealand) Craig Perks (c)	75-72=147	+3	
CUT	(United States) John Rollins	74-73=147	+3	
CUT	(United States) Patrick Sheehan	75-72=147	+3	
CUT	(United States) Billy Andrade	73-75=148	+4	
CUT	(Paraguay) Carlos Franco	74-74=148	+4	
CUT	(United States) Harrison Frazar	78-70=148	+4	
CUT	(United States) Todd Hamilton	74-74=148	+4	
CUT	(United States) Hank Kuehne	70-78=148	+4	
CUT	(Australia) Geoff Ogilvy	74-74=148	+4	
CUT	(United States) Dennis Paulson	75-73=148	+4	
CUT	(England) Ian Poulter	70-78=148	+4	
CUT	(United States) Chris Riley	76-72=148	+4	
CUT	(United States) Rich Beem	72-77=149	+5	
CUT	(Australia) Stephen Leaney	72-77=149	+5	
CUT	(United States) Kevin Na	77-72=149	+5	
CUT	(Sweden) Freddie Jacobson	73-77=150	+6	
CUT	(United States) Justin Leonard (c)	76-74=150	+6	
CUT	(United States) Woody Austin	78-73=151	+7	
CUT	(United States) Scott McCarron	76-76=152	+8	
CUT	(United States) Ryan Palmer	76-76=152	+8	
CUT	(Australia) Stephen Allan	77-77=154	+10	
CUT	(Australia) Andre Stolz	78-76=154	+10	
CUT	(United States) David Duval (c)	76-79=155	+11	
CUT	(Australia) Stuart Appleby	80-78=158	+14	
WD	(United States) Brent Geiberger	69-70-78=217	+1	
WD	(Denmark) Thomas Bjørn	69-74=143	−1	
WD	(Japan) Hidemichi Tanaka	72	E	
WD	(United States) Neal Lancaster	81	+9	
WD	(United States) Hal Sutton (c)	84	+12	

==== Scorecard ====
Final round

Hole	1	2	3	4	5	6	7	8	9	10	11	12	13	14	15	16	17	18
Par	4	5	3	4	4	4	4	3	5	4	5	4	3	4	4	5	3	4
(United States) Funk	−8	−8	−7	−7	−7	−7	−8	−9	−9	−9	−9	−10	−11	−10	−9	−10	−9	−9
(England) Donald	−11	−11	−12	−10	−10	−10	−9	−9	−8	−9	−9	−8	−8	−7	−7	−8	−8	−8
(United States) Lehman	−4	−5	−5	−6	−7	−8	−8	−7	−7	−7	−8	−8	−8	−8	−7	−8	−8	−8
(United States) Verplank	−6	−7	−7	−7	−7	−8	−8	−8	−9	−9	−7	−8	−9	−9	−9	−9	−9	−8
(United States) Durant	−11	−12	−11	−11	−10	−10	−10	−10	−10	−10	−10	−9	−9	−8	−8	−8	−8	−7
(Australia) Elkington	−6	−6	−6	−4	−4	−4	−5	−5	−6	−6	−6	−7	−7	−7	−7	−8	−7	−6
(United States) Herron	−10	−10	−10	−10	−9	−9	−9	−8	−7	−8	−8	−9	−8	−7	−7	−7	−7	−6
(United States) Johnson	−9	−9	−9	−10	−9	−8	−8	−7	−7	−7	−7	−8	−8	−8	−8	−8	−6	−5

Cumulative tournament scores, relative to par

Birdie	Bogey	Double bogey
