= Steve Marino (golfer) =

American professional golfer (born 1980)

Personal information
- Full name: Stephen Paul Marino Jr.
- Nationality: United States
- Born: March 10, 1980 (age 46) Altus, Oklahoma, U.S.
- Height: 6 ft 0 in (1.83 m)
- Weight: 180 lb (82 kg; 13 st)

Career
- Sport: Golf
- College: University of Virginia
- Turned professional: 2002
- Former tours: PGA Tour; Korn Ferry Tour; Golden Bear Tour; Gateway Tour; Tarheel Tour
- Professional wins: 11
- Highest ranking: 54 (March 27, 2011)

Best results in major championships
- Masters Tournament: T14: 2010
- PGA Championship: T60: 2008
- U.S. Open: T63: 2010
- The Open Championship: T38: 2009

Stephen Paul Marino Jr. (born March 10, 1980) is an American professional golfer who played on the PGA Tour.

== Early life ==
A military brat, Marino was born in Altus, Oklahoma, where his father, Steve Sr., was stationed as a navigator in the U.S. Air Force. The family moved to Alaska when he was an infant, and later to Ohio and Alabama. In 1991, they relocated to Fairfax, Virginia, a suburb southwest of Washington, D.C., where they continue to reside.

Marino's golf game began to blossom at age 14, when he worked and played at the Army Navy Country Club in Fairfax; he graduated from W.T. Woodson High School in 1998. During his senior year he won the Virginia High School championship,

== Amateur career ==
Marino received a golf scholarship to the University of Virginia in Charlottesville. At the end of his freshman year, he won the 1999 Virginia Amateur championship. He was a member of the Beta Theta Pi fraternity. Marino graduated from the university in 2002 with a degree in sociology.

== Professional career ==
Marino embarked on his professional career in 2002 on the Tar Heel Tour, and moved to Florida to practice and play year-round. He qualified for the Canadian Tour for the 2003 season, and went to Canada again in 2004, but then headed back to Florida. There he played on the Golden Bear Tour, a developmental circuit backed by Jack Nicklaus in which all the events were within 60 miles (100 km) of West Palm Beach, near where he lived then (and now).

Before reaching the PGA Tour, Marino won the 2006 Sidney Frank Memorial Gateway Tour Championship, where he carded a 13-under-par 59 during the third round. It was his second Gateway Tour win of 2006. Marino was a Monday qualifier on the Nationwide Tour in 2006, where he earned $134,000 and finished 42nd on the money list, which was insufficient to earn a PGA Tour card. Instead, he qualified through the six-round qualifying school in December, earning his card for the 2007 season.

In his rookie season of 2007, Marino finished 80th on the PGA Tour money list and retained his tour card for 2008, with winnings exceeding $1,100,000. He had four top-10 finishes in 31 events. In 2008, Marino finished 34th on the PGA Tour money list, earning over $2,000,000, and retained his tour card for 2009. He had six top-10 finishes in 32 events, highlighted by a career-best second-place finish in the Mayakoba Golf Classic at Riviera Maya-Cancun in Mexico.

In May 2009, Marino and Tim Clark lost to Steve Stricker in a two-hole playoff at the Crowne Plaza Invitational at Colonial in Fort Worth, Texas. Marino received international attention in 2009 when he was co-leader (with Tom Watson) at the halfway point of the 2009 Open Championship at Turnberry in Scotland. However, Marino faltered over the weekend and finished the event tied 38th. He finished the 2009 season 35th on the PGA Tour money list.

Marino finished tied for second at the 2011 Sony Open in Hawaii. He led the 2011 AT&T Pebble Beach National Pro-Am after the second and third rounds, but on the final day, eventual winner D. A. Points passed him. Marino had to make an eagle on the par-5 18th hole in order to tie Points, who had finished. But Marino hit into the Pacific Ocean and took a triple-bogey eight, which dropped him into a tie for fourth place. Marino led the 2011 Arnold Palmer Invitational during the fourth round, as late as the 17th hole. But he suffered two buried lies in bunkers on the 15th and 17th holes, and despite making a birdie on the final hole, ended in second place, one stroke behind winner Martin Laird. Marino advanced his position on the Official World Golf Ranking to a career high of #54. Marino was identified as the best PGA Tour player without a victory by writer Craig Dolch, who noted that he has posted 21 top-10 finishes in his 124 Tour starts to date.

In January 2012, Marino was diagnosed with a bone contusion on the tip of his tibia and femur in his left leg. He did not play again until May. In 2012, he played at total of six PGA Tour events, making the cut in two of them. In 2013, he played in 12 PGA Tour events, making the cut five times.

In March 2016, Marino lost in a sudden-death playoff to Tony Finau at the Puerto Rico Open. In the playoff, both players birdied the 18th hole twice. But playing the 18th for the third time in the playoff, Marino three-putted from just off the green for a par, while Finau birdied the hole again for the win. This was Marino's fifth runner-up finish of his career but he is still winless in 182 events on the PGA Tour.

== Personal life ==
Marino currently resides in Tequesta, Florida.

== Amateur wins ==
- 1999 Virginia State Amateur

== Professional wins (11) ==
=== Golden Bear Tour wins (6) ===
| No. | Date | Tournament | Winning score | Margin of victory | Runner(s)-up |
|---|---|---|---|---|---|
| 1 | Jan 25, 2004 | St Andrews Classic | −5 (71-68=139) | 2 strokes | (United States) Jeff Barlow |
| 2 | Feb 11, 2004 | Nicklaus Golf Equipment Classic 1 | −12 (69-65-70=204) | 2 strokes | (United States) Jeff Barlow, (United States) Bryant MacKellar |
| 3 | Jul 30, 2004 | Nicklaus Golf Equipment Classic 2 | −20 (70-63-67-68=268) | 1 stroke | (United States) Dave Clodfelter |
| 4 | Feb 24, 2005 | Estates 2 | −13 (70-67-66=203) | Playoff | (United States) Steve Wheatcroft |
| 5 | Mar 3, 2005 | Fox Club | −3 (72-73-68=213) | 2 strokes | (Republic of Ireland) Sean Quinlivan |
| 6 | Apr 1, 2005 | Hammock Creek 2 | −18 (69-63-66=198) | 1 stroke | (United States) Steve Burns |

=== Gateway Tour wins (3) ===
| No. | Date | Tournament | Winning score | Margin of victory | Runner(s)-up |
|---|---|---|---|---|---|
| 1 | Jan 13, 2006 | Beach Spring A2 | −20 (66-63-67=196) | 1 stroke | (United States) Patrick Hawkins |
| 2 | Apr 12, 2006 | Beach Spring B4 | −5 (71-68-72=211) | 3 strokes | (United States) Jamie Neher, (United States) Paul Wackerly III |
| 3 | Oct 1, 2006 | Sidney Frank Memorial Tour Championship | −27 (67-68-59-67=261) | 10 strokes | (United States) David Lutterus |

=== Tarheel Tour wins (2) ===
| No. | Date | Tournament | Winning score | Margin of victory | Runner(s)-up |
|---|---|---|---|---|---|
| 1 | Oct 10, 2002 | Springfield Open | −6 (71-73-66=210) | 1 stroke | (United States) Derek Watson |
| 2 | Oct 24, 2002 | Tarheel Tour Championship | −2 (71-70-73=214) | 2 strokes | (United States) Chris Greenwood, (United States) Derek Watson |

== Playoff record ==
PGA Tour playoff record (0–2)

| No. | Year | Tournament | Opponent(s) | Result |
|---|---|---|---|---|
| 1 | 2009 | Crowne Plaza Invitational at Colonial | (South Africa) Tim Clark, (United States) Steve Stricker | Stricker won with birdie on second extra hole |
| 2 | 2016 | Puerto Rico Open | (United States) Tony Finau | Lost to birdie on third extra hole |

Web.com Tour playoff record (0–1)

| No. | Year | Tournament | Opponent | Result |
|---|---|---|---|---|
| 1 | 2015 | Pacific Rubiales Colombia Championship | (United States) Patrick Rodgers | Lost to birdie on second extra hole |

== Results in major championships ==
| Tournament | 2007 | 2008 | 2009 | 2010 | 2011 | 2012 | 2013 | 2014 | 2015 |
|---|---|---|---|---|---|---|---|---|---|
| Masters Tournament | | | | T14 | T42 | | | | |
| U.S. Open | CUT | CUT | | T63 | | CUT | | | CUT |
| The Open Championship | | | T38 | T55 | CUT | | | | |
| PGA Championship | | T60 | CUT | CUT | CUT | | | | |

Did not play

CUT = missed the half-way cut
"T" = tied

=== Summary ===
| Tournament | Wins | 2nd | 3rd | Top-5 | Top-10 | Top-25 | Events | Cuts made |
|---|---|---|---|---|---|---|---|---|
| Masters Tournament | 0 | 0 | 0 | 0 | 0 | 1 | 2 | 2 |
| U.S. Open | 0 | 0 | 0 | 0 | 0 | 0 | 5 | 1 |
| The Open Championship | 0 | 0 | 0 | 0 | 0 | 0 | 3 | 2 |
| PGA Championship | 0 | 0 | 0 | 0 | 0 | 0 | 4 | 1 |
| Totals | 0 | 0 | 0 | 0 | 0 | 1 | 14 | 6 |

- Most consecutive cuts made – 3 (2010 Masters – 2010 Open)

== Results in The Players Championship ==
| Tournament | 2007 | 2008 | 2009 | 2010 | 2011 |
|---|---|---|---|---|---|
| The Players Championship | CUT | CUT | T79 | T32 | T19 |

CUT = missed the halfway cut
"T" indicates a tie for a place

== Results in World Golf Championships ==
| Tournament | 2009 | 2010 |
|---|---|---|
| Match Play | | |
| Championship | | T65 |
| Invitational | | |
| Champions | T57 | |

Did not play

"T" = Tied

== PGA Tour career summary ==
| Season | Wins | Earnings ($) | Rank |
|---|---|---|---|
| 2005 | 0 | 14,542 | n/a |
| 2006 | 0 | 0 | n/a |
| 2007 | 0 | 1,179,165 | 80 |
| 2008 | 0 | 2,094,267 | 34 |
| 2009 | 0 | 2,161,539 | 35 |
| 2010 | 0 | 1,479,239 | 61 |
| 2011 | 0 | 1,975,076 | 38 |
| 2012 | 0 | 85,040 | 212 |
| 2013 | 0 | 148,874 | 192 |
| 2014 | 0 | 294,565 | 170 |
| 2015 | 0 | 0 | n/a |
| 2016 | 0 | 768,200 | 120 |
| 2017 | 0 | 98,573 | 214 |
| 2018 | 0 | 76,616 | 220 |
| Career* | 0 | 10,375,697 | 175 |

*Complete through the 2018 season.

== See also ==
- 2006 PGA Tour Qualifying School graduates
- 2015 Web.com Tour Finals graduates
