= 2014 Web.com Tour Finals graduates =

This is a list of golf players who graduated from the Web.com Tour Finals in 2014. The top 25 players on the Web.com Tour's regular season money list in 2014 earned their PGA Tour card for 2015. The Finals determined the other 25 players to earn their PGA Tour cards and their priority order.

To determine the initial 2015 PGA Tour priority rank, the top 25 Web.com Tour's regular season players were alternated with the top 25 Web.com Tour Finals players. This priority order was then reshuffled several times during the 2015 season.

Under the new format, Adam Hadwin (Finals and regular season combined earnings) and Derek Fathauer (Finals earnings) were fully exempt for the 2014–15 season and received invitations to The Players Championship. Carlos Ortiz was also fully exempt on the PGA Tour after a three-win season.

== 2014 Web.com Tour Finals ==
Player	2014 Web.com Tour regular season		2014 FedEx Cup	2014 Web.com Tour Finals				The 25 Regular + Finals		Priority rank
Player	Rank	Earnings ($)	2014 FedEx Cup	Rank	Without The 25	Earnings ($)	Best finish	Rank	Earnings ($)	Priority rank
(Canada) Adam Hadwin*	4	293,667		2		236,125	Win	1	529,792	Exempt
(United States) Derek Fathauer	13	218,052		1		250,133	Win	4	468,185	Exempt
(Mexico) Carlos Ortiz*	1	515,403		n/a		0	Cut	2	515,403	Exempt
(United States) Bud Cauley	197	4,460	143	4	1	180,000	Win			1
(United States) Justin Thomas*	5	276,637		3		204,633	Win	3	481,270	2
(United States) Colt Knost	34	106,460		5	2	154,000	2			3
(United States) John Peterson			179	6	3	130,592	2			4
(United States) Andrew Putnam*	2	320,438		49		22,200	T12	5	342,638	5
(South Africa) Richard Sterne^{†}				7	4	111,800	2			6
(United States) Jason Gore	9	253,046	176	12		87,300	3	6	340,346	7
(United States) Zac Blair*	41	97,799		8	5	108,000	2			8
(United States) Tony Finau*	8	254,315		17		65,442	T6	7	319,757	9
(United States) Sam Saunders^{†}	45	95,341		9	6	106,592	T4			10
(United States) Zack Sucher*	3	294,166		57		19,300	T14	8	313,466	11
(United States) Jim Herman			182	10	7	101,725	T4x2			12
(United States) Blayne Barber*	7	269,111		27		42,340	T6	9	311,451	13
(Sweden) David Lingmerth			134	11	8	99,368	T4			14
(Germany) Alex Čejka	6	276,448	227	89		8,099	T34	10	284,547	15
(United States) Tom Hoge*	65	72,616		13	9	83,827	3			16
(New Zealand) Steven Alker	10	249,536		72		12,365	T25	11	261,901	17
(England) Greg Owen	27	143,631	208	14	10	74,527	3			18
(United States) Andres Gonzales	11	238,620		82		10,025	T25	12	248,645	19
(United States) Tom Gillis	54	86,161		15	11	72,250	T4			20
(United States) Jon Curran*	12	231,854		n/a		0	Cut	13	231,854	21
(South Korea) Kim Meen-whee*	72	68,406		16	12	67,000	T3			22
(Australia) Cameron Percy	14	217,347		95		6,950	T40	14	224,297	23
(United States) Scott Pinckney*	37	101,941		18	13	62,673	T4			24
(United States) Daniel Berger*	15	209,286		68		14,200	T19	15	223,486	25
(South Africa) Tyrone van Aswegen			144	19	14	61,760	T7			26
(United States) Jonathan Randolph*	16	203,676		85		9,527	T27	16	213,203	27
(United States) Sean O'Hair			160	20	15	58,000	T3			28
(United States) Max Homa^{†}	17	192,350		59		19,227	T25	17	211,577	29
(United States) Heath Slocum			129	21	16	57,133	T4			30
(United States) Mark Hubbard*	18	187,448		75		11,315	T31	18	198,763	31
(United States) J. J. Henry			128	22	17	45,227	5			32
(United States) Steve Wheatcroft	19	183,411		84		9,808	T25	19	193,219	33
(Canada) Nick Taylor*	69	70,389		23	18	44,335	T9			34
(United States) Kyle Reifers	25	146,836		25		43,275	T4	20	190,111	35
(United States) Hudson Swafford			146	24	19	44,172	T10			36
(United States) Ryan Armour	20	180,856		T119		2,360	72	21	183,216	37
(United States) Alex Prugh	36	103,864	206	26	20	42,805	T14			38
(United States) Byron Smith*	21	177,172		T112		2,992	T46	22	180,164	39
(Mexico) Óscar Fraustro*	61	75,169		28	21	39,375	T4			40
(United States) Bill Lunde	22	168,864		83		9,920	T27	23	178,784	41
(South Korea) Park Sung-joon*	73	68,402		29	22	38,500	T11			42
(Canada) Roger Sloan*	24	159,018		86		9,040	T32	24	168,058	43
(United States) Chad Collins			159	30	23	37,995	T7			44
(Argentina) Fabián Gómez	23	162,322	247	n/a		0	Cut	25	162,322	45
(United States) Carlos Sainz Jr.*	74	67,897		31	24	37,925	T12			46
(United States) Eric Axley			184	32	25	36,312	T12			47

- *: PGA Tour rookie in 2015
- ^{†}: First-time PGA Tour member in 2015, but ineligible for rookie status due to having played eight or more Tour events in a previous season
- Earned spot in Finals through PGA Tour.
- Earned spot in Finals through FedEx Cup points earned as a PGA Tour non-member.
- Indicates whether the player earned his card through the regular season or through the Finals.

== Results on 2014–15 PGA Tour ==
Player	Starts	Cuts made	Best finish	Money list rank	Earnings ($)	FedEx Cup rank
(Canada) Adam Hadwin*	30	18	T5	110	937,611	107
(United States) Derek Fathauer	27	13	T7	158	482,023	169
(Mexico) Carlos Ortiz*	30	20	T9	106	964,137	93
(United States) Bud Cauley	0	0	DNP	n/a	0	n/a
(United States) Justin Thomas*	30	23	T4x2	37	2,278,564	32
(United States) Colt Knost	29	17	T10x4	94	1,066,553	91
(United States) John Peterson	25	19	T11	121	779,509	105
(United States) Andrew Putnam*	23	10	T12	178	282,879	182
(South Africa) Richard Sterne^{†}	18	1	T39	239	27,690	233
(United States) Jason Gore	26	12	2	92	1,101,246	92
(United States) Zac Blair*	34	20	T4	78	1,244,676	59
(United States) Tony Finau*	31	22	T7x2	40	2,095,186	43
(United States) Sam Saunders^{†}	28	13	T2	150	578,571	137
(United States) Zack Sucher*	18	5	T20	212	85,614	206
(United States) Jim Herman	27	18	T4	80	1,212,778	74
(United States) Blayne Barber*	26	12	T8	122	768,383	145
(Sweden) David Lingmerth	28	17	Win	29	2,736,378	37
(Germany) Alex Čejka	30	18	Win	79	1,227,196	71
(United States) Tom Hoge*	26	15	T5	132	690,319	132
(New Zealand) Steven Alker	22	9	T22	185	236,862	177
(England) Greg Owen	19	9	2	83	1,180,794	104
(United States) Andres Gonzales	28	17	T3	111	925,335	115
(United States) Tom Gillis	16	8	2	143	634,554	142
(United States) Jon Curran*	28	14	T2	95	1,049,549	113
(South Korea) Kim Meen-whee*	23	13	T3	123	755,998	141
(Australia) Cameron Percy	23	13	T10	151	575,943	150
(United States) Scott Pinckney*	27	17	T2	76	1,259,389	83
(United States) Daniel Berger*	31	17	2x2	25	3,028,901	11
(South Africa) Tyrone van Aswegen	20	8	T15	196	168,234	191
(United States) Jonathan Randolph*	25	11	T20	182	256,066	179
(United States) Sean O'Hair	26	18	T2	58	1,662,300	42
(United States) Max Homa^{†}	27	12	T6	171	380,339	163
(United States) Heath Slocum	22	6	T21	207	122,480	211
(United States) Mark Hubbard*	25	15	T20	176	293,980	164
(United States) J. J. Henry	30	17	Win	96	1,046,123	90
(United States) Steve Wheatcroft	28	17	T2	105	973,024	114
(Canada) Nick Taylor*	28	17	Win	93	1,072,360	101
(United States) Kyle Reifers	31	17	2	84	1,179,228	78
(United States) Hudson Swafford	30	18	T8	107	959,391	81
(United States) Ryan Armour	17	6	T22	199	144,229	195
(United States) Alex Prugh	27	15	T5	142	636,373	133
(United States) Byron Smith*	21	8	T19	198	153,930	202
(Mexico) Óscar Fraustro*	21	7	T9	181	262,475	186
(United States) Bill Lunde	18	8	T25	204	128,788	197
(South Korea) Park Sung-joon*	27	13	T2	147	597,103	135
(Canada) Roger Sloan*	20	7	T18	203	133,048	200
(United States) Chad Collins	24	16	T6	125	747,899	120
(Argentina) Fabián Gómez	26	16	Win	59	1,651,012	64
(United States) Carlos Sainz Jr.*	20	3	T9	205	124,115	213
(United States) Eric Axley	21	7	T22x2	195	170,687	189

- *: PGA Tour rookie in 2015
- ^{†}: First-time PGA Tour member in 2015, but ineligible for rookie status due to having played eight or more Tour events in a previous season
- Retained his PGA Tour card for 2016: won or finished in the top 125 of the money list or FedEx Cup points list.
- Retained PGA Tour conditional status and qualified for the Web.com Tour Finals: finished between 126–150 on FedEx Cup list and qualified for Web.com Tour Finals.
- Failed to retain his PGA Tour card for 2016 but qualified for the Web.com Tour Finals: finished between 150–200 on FedEx Cup list.
- Failed to retain his PGA Tour card for 2016 and to qualify for the Web.com Tour Finals: finished outside the top 200 on FedEx Cup list.

Tom Hoge, Sam Saunders, Mark Hubbard, Derek Fathauer, and Tyrone van Aswegen regained their PGA Tour cards through the 2015 Web.com Tour Finals. Bud Cauley suffered a torn labrum in September 2014, and could not play in 2015. He retained his PGA Tour card in 2016 through a medical extension.

== Winners on the PGA Tour in 2015 ==
No.	Date	Player	Tournament	Winning score	Margin of victory	Runners-up	Payout ($)
1	Nov 9, 2014	(Canada) Nick Taylor	Sanderson Farms Championship	−16 (67-69-70-66=272)	2 strokes	(United States) Jason Bohn, (United States) Boo Weekley	720,000
2	Mar 8, 2015	(Germany) Alex Čejka	Puerto Rico Open	−7 (70-67-75-69=281)	Playoff	(United States) Jon Curran, (Argentina) Emiliano Grillo (United States) Tim Petrovic, (United States) Sam Saunders	540,000
3	Jun 7	(Sweden) David Lingmerth	Memorial Tournament	−15 (67-65-72-69=273)	Playoff	(England) Justin Rose	1,160,000
4	Jun 14	(Argentina) Fabián Gómez	FedEx St. Jude Classic	−13 (66-68-67-66=267)	4 strokes	(England) Greg Owen	1,080,000
5	Aug 9	(United States) J. J. Henry	Barracuda Championship	47 (13-11-17-6)	Playoff	(United States) Kyle Reifers	558,000

== Runners-up on the PGA Tour in 2015 ==
No.	Date	Player	Tournament	Winner	Winning score	Runner-up score	Payout ($)
1&2	Jan 25	(South Korea) Park Sung-joon	Humana Challenge	(United States) Bill Haas	−22 (67-63-69-67=266)	−21 (68-67-67-65=267)	342,000
1&2	Jan 25	(United States) Steve Wheatcroft	Humana Challenge	(United States) Bill Haas	−22 (67-63-69-67=266)	−21 (65-67-68-67=267)	342,000
3	Mar 2	(United States) Daniel Berger; Lost in playoff	The Honda Classic	(Republic of Ireland) Pádraig Harrington	−6 (67-66-71-70=274)	−6 (68-71-71-64=274)	658,800
4&5	Mar 8	(United States) Jon Curran; Lost in five-man playoff	Puerto Rico Open	(Germany) Alex Čejka	−7 (70-67-75-69=281)	−7 (70-71-70-70=281)	198,000
4&5	Mar 8	(United States) Sam Saunders; Lost in five-man playoff	Puerto Rico Open	(Germany) Alex Čejka	−7 (70-67-75-69=281)	−7 (72-72-69-68=281)	198,000
6	Mar 15	(United States) Sean O'Hair; Lost in three-man playoff	Valspar Championship	(United States) Jordan Spieth	−10 (70-67-68-69=274)	−10 (66-72-69-67=274)	519,200
7	May 31	(United States) Scott Pinckney	AT&T Byron Nelson	(Australia) Steven Bowditch	−18 (62-68-65-64=259)	−14 (69-64-64-66=263)	530,133
8	Jun 14	(England) Greg Owen	FedEx St. Jude Classic	(Argentina) Fabián Gómez	−13 (66-68-67-66=267)	−9 (64-70-67-70=271)	648,000
9	Jul 12	(United States) Tom Gillis; Lost in playoff	John Deere Classic	(United States) Jordan Spieth	−20 (71-64-61-68=264)	−20 (66-65-69-64=264)	507,600
10	Aug 9	(United States) Kyle Reifers; Lost in playoff	Barracuda Championship	(United States) J. J. Henry	47 points (13-11-17-6)	47 points (9-14-2-22)	334,800
11	Aug 23	(United States) Jason Gore	Wyndham Championship	(United States) Davis Love III	−17 (64-66-69-64=263)	−16 (66-67-62-69=264)	583,200
12	Sep 20	(United States) Daniel Berger	BMW Championship	(Australia) Jason Day	−22 (61-63-69-69=262)	−16 (65-64-70-69=268)	891,000
