= Steve Wheatcroft =

American professional golfer (born 1978)

Personal information
- Full name: Steven John Wheatcroft
- Nickname: Wheatie
- Nationality: United States
- Born: February 21, 1978 (age 48) Indiana, Pennsylvania, U.S.
- Height: 6 ft 3 in (1.91 m)
- Weight: 215 lb (98 kg; 15.4 st)

Career
- Sport: Golf
- College: Indiana University Bloomington
- Turned professional: 2001
- Former tours: PGA Tour; Korn Ferry Tour; Golden Bear Tour; Gateway Tour
- Professional wins: 11

Number of wins by tour
- Korn Ferry Tour: 2
- Other: 9

Best results in major championships
- Masters Tournament: DNP
- PGA Championship: DNP
- U.S. Open: T63: 2010
- The Open Championship: DNP

Steven John Wheatcroft (born February 21, 1978) is an American professional golfer.

== Early life and amateur career ==
Wheatcroft was born in Indiana, Pennsylvania, grew up in Washington, Pennsylvania, and attended Indiana University Bloomington and Kelley School of Business earning a degree in Sports Marketing and Management.

== Professional career ==
In 2001, Wheatcroft turned professional and has played in several tours over the years. His first victory came at the Pennsylvania Open Championship in 2003. He is currently a member of the PGA Tour.

In his 2006 Nationwide Tour debut season, Wheatcroft recorded only one top-10 and missed the cut 12 times. Despite his difficulties, he would perform well at the PGA Tour Q-School. He finished 7th to earn his card for 2007. He would make only 10 cuts out of 25 attempts and post one top 25. Consequently, he lost his card. He returned to the Nationwide Tour in 2008 and had disappointing results until the summer of 2009.

Wheatcroft made some changes to his game. As a result, he recorded six top-10s and two top-25s before the end of the season. He launched up the money list to 20th and earned his card for the 2010 PGA Tour.

Wheatcroft would play well at the Puerto Rico Open, finishing tied for 3rd, three strokes behind fellow Nationwide Tour graduate, Derek Lamely. He also qualified for the 2010 U.S. Open after winning a 4-way playoff at the Rockville, Maryland sectional qualifier. He led briefly midway through the second round. He returned to the Nationwide Tour for the 2011 season after finishing 166th on the PGA Tour's money list.

At the 2011 Melwood Prince George's County Open, Wheatcroft won by a record-breaking 12 strokes. At the 72nd hole, he made an eagle putt to finish at 255 (-29); shattering the previous 72-hole scoring record by three strokes. He also set the record for largest 54-hole lead by eight strokes.

Wheatcroft's strong play would continue through the 2011 season, with three more top-10s and four top-25s. After finishing tied for 8th at the season-ending Nationwide Tour Championship, he ended the year at 20th on the money list. Wheatcroft returned to the PGA Tour once again for 2012.

Wheatcroft played on the Web.com Tour in 2013 and 2014. In 2014, he finished 19th in the regular season rankings to earn another return to the PGA Tour.

== Professional wins (11) ==
=== Web.com Tour wins (2) ===
| No. | Date | Tournament | Winning score | Margin of victory | Runner(s)-up |
|---|---|---|---|---|---|
| 1 | Jun 5, 2011 | Melwood Prince George's County Open | −29 (66-60-65-64=255) | 12 strokes | (United States) Ryan Armour, (Canada) Jon Mills |
| 2 | Jul 20, 2014 | Albertsons Boise Open | −24 (64-66-65-66=260) | Playoff | (New Zealand) Steven Alker |

Web.com Tour playoff record (1–0)

| No. | Year | Tournament | Opponent | Result |
|---|---|---|---|---|
| 1 | 2014 | Albertsons Boise Open | (New Zealand) Steven Alker | Won with birdie on second extra hole |

=== Golden Bear Tour wins (4) ===
| No. | Date | Tournament | Winning score | Margin of victory | Runner(s)-up |
|---|---|---|---|---|---|
| 1 | Feb 25, 2004 | St Andrews Classic 2 | −11 (70-70-65=205) | 5 strokes | (Republic of Ireland) Sean Quinlivan |
| 2 | Feb 29, 2004 | Sandridge | −2 (70-72=142) | Playoff | (United States) Terry Hatch, (United States) Rick Heath |
| 3 | Feb 16, 2005 | Wellington | −11 (66-69-70=205) | 3 strokes | (United States) Lee Stroever |
| 4 | Mar 11, 2005 | Madison Green | −8 (65-71=136) | 2 strokes | (United States) Mike Adamson |

=== Gateway Tour wins (4) ===
| No. | Date | Tournament | Winning score | Margin of victory | Runner-up |
|---|---|---|---|---|---|
| 1 | Jul 16, 2004 | Beach Series 6 | −22 (65-70-64-67=266) | 2 strokes | (United States) Kevin Gessino-Kraft |
| 2 | Aug 4, 2005 | Beach Series 8 | −26 (69-66-65-62=262) | 3 strokes | (United States) Paul Wackerly III |
| 3 | Aug 12, 2005 | Beach Series 9 | −15 (69-64-70-67=270) | 2 strokes | (Japan) Akio Sadakata |
| 4 | Sep 12, 2008 | Beach Summer 12 | −10 (66-74-66=206) | 3 strokes | (United States) Jeremy Pope |

=== Other wins (1) ===
- 2003 Pennsylvania Open Championship

== Results in major championships ==
| Tournament | 2010 |
|---|---|
| U.S. Open | T63 |

"T" = Tied
Note: Wheatcroft only played in the U.S. Open.

== See also ==
- 2006 PGA Tour Qualifying School graduates
- 2009 Nationwide Tour graduates
- 2011 Nationwide Tour graduates
- 2014 Web.com Tour Finals graduates
- 2017 Web.com Tour Finals graduates
