= Brian Gay =

American professional golfer

Personal information
- Full name: Joseph Brian Gay
- Nickname: The King of Bermuda Grass
- Nationality: United States
- Born: December 14, 1971 (age 54) Fort Worth, Texas, U.S.
- Height: 5 ft 10 in (1.78 m)
- Weight: 165 lb (75 kg; 11.8 st)
- Spouse: Kimberly
- Children: 2

Career
- Sport: Golf
- College: University of Florida
- Turned professional: 1994
- Current tour: PGA Tour Champions
- Former tours: PGA Tour; Asian Tour; Hooters Tour; Golden Bear Tour
- Professional wins: 15
- Highest ranking: 35 (June 14, 2009)

Number of wins by tour
- PGA Tour: 5
- Other: 10

Best results in major championships
- Masters Tournament: T38: 2013
- PGA Championship: T20: 2008
- U.S. Open: T20: 2018
- The Open Championship: CUT: 2001, 2009, 2010, 2016

Joseph Brian Gay (born December 14, 1971) is an American professional golfer. During his career, he won five times on the PGA Tour. After turning 50, he played on the PGA Tour Champions.

== Early life ==
A military brat, Gay was born in Fort Worth, Texas, but was raised primarily at Fort Rucker, Alabama, where his father was a U.S. Army non-commissioned officer involved in flight operations. His father was also a member of the All-Army golf team in his spare time.

As an only child, Gay spent much of his youth at the Fort Rucker golf course, first at the practice area, then on the course. Encouraged by a group of military retirees he often played with, he dominated the local tournament scene as a tween.

== Amateur career ==
Gay's success as a teenager led to his receiving an athletic scholarship to attend the University of Florida, where he played for coach Buddy Alexander's Florida Gators men's golf team in National Collegiate Athletic Association (NCAA) competition from 1991 to 1994. During his time as a Gator golfer, the team won four consecutive Southeastern Conference (SEC) championships (1991–1994), and the 1993 NCAA Division I Men's Golf Championships.

As a collegian, he was the SEC Freshman of the Year (1991), a five-time individual medalist, two-time SEC individual champion (1992, 1994), three-time first-team All-SEC selection (1992–1994), and two-time All-American (1992, 1993). Gay was later inducted into the University of Florida Athletic Hall of Fame as a "Gator Great" in 2010.

== Professional career ==
In 1994, Gay turned professional. He mostly competed on mini-tours in the United States, winning several tournaments, before qualifying for the PGA Tour in 1999. Gay picked up his first win on the tour at the Mayakoba Golf Classic at Riviera Maya-Cancun in 2008 after 293 starts, with his second win coming at the Verizon Heritage in 2009. He won the event by ten strokes, finishing at 20-under par. The ten-stroke victory is one of the biggest wins in the PGA Tour's history. His best position on the year-end money list was 13th in 2009. He has featured in the top 50 of the Official World Golf Ranking, ranking as high as 35th in 2009.

Gay was not exempt to play in the 2009 U.S. Open heading into the St. Jude Classic. He was one of seven golfers who could earn the last spot in the U.S. Open by winning the St. Jude Classic, using the "Winners of multiple PGA Tour events since the last Open" exemption. Gay went on to win by five strokes over David Toms and Bryce Molder for his second wire-to-wire win of the season.

In 2013, Gay won for the first time in four years at the Humana Challenge, the fourth victory of his PGA Tour career. He defeated Charles Howell III on the second hole of a three-man sudden-death playoff when he made birdie. Earlier, David Lingmerth had been eliminated on the first extra hole. This performance helped Gay earn the PGA Tour Player of the Month award for January.

Gay did not play during the 2014–15 season after back surgery and played the next two seasons on a Major Medical Extension. A T6 at the 2017 Valero Texas Open secured his return to the PGA Tour.

In November 2020, Gay won his fifth PGA Tour event (and first in seven years) at the Bermuda Championship when he defeated Wyndham Clark in a playoff. Gay was two strokes behind the 54-hole leader Doc Redman at the start of the final round but shot a 7-under 64 on Sunday en route to the win.

Gay has always been a very short hitter of the ball, but has been hailed as one of golf's greatest putters in the game's modern era. He was ranked inside the top 25 in strokes gained putting on the PGA Tour for ten seasons in a row from 2004 to 2013, achieving the top ten in five of those seasons and achieving his career high of 4th in the 2012 season. All of his five PGA Tour victories have taken place on venues with Bermuda grass greens in the southern portion of the United States or in other countries with warm climates year-round. During the final round broadcast in the 2020 Bermuda Championship, golf channel commentator and 12-time PGA Tour winner Justin Leonard gave Brian Gay the nickname "King of Bermuda Grass" paying homage to these distinctions.

== Personal life ==
Gay was mentioned frequently in Bud, Sweat and Tees: A Walk on the Wild Side of the PGA Tour by Alan Shipnuck, which profiled Rich Beem's rookie year on the PGA Tour. Steve Duplantis, who became Gay's caddy following a split with Beem, was chronicled as well in Shipnuck's book.

== Awards and honors ==
- In 1991, Gay earned SEC Freshman of the Year honors.
- From 1992 through 1994, Gay earned first-team All-SEC honors.
- In 1992 and 1993, Gay earned All-American honors.
- In 2010, Gay was inducted into the University of Florida Athletic Hall of Fame.

== Professional wins (15) ==
=== PGA Tour wins (5) ===
No.	Date	Tournament	Winning score	Margin of victory	Runner(s)-up
1	Feb 24, 2008	Mayakoba Golf Classic	−16 (66-67-62-69=264)	2 strokes	(United States) Steve Marino
2	Apr 19, 2009	Verizon Heritage	−20 (67-66-67-64=264)	10 strokes	(United States) Briny Baird, (England) Luke Donald
3	Jun 14, 2009	St. Jude Classic	−18 (64-66-66-66=262)	5 strokes	(United States) Bryce Molder, (United States) David Toms
4	Jan 21, 2013	Humana Challenge	−25 (67-66-67-63=263)	Playoff	(United States) Charles Howell III, (Sweden) David Lingmerth
5	Nov 1, 2020	Bermuda Championship	−15 (70-68-67-64=269)	Playoff	(United States) Wyndham Clark

PGA Tour playoff record (2–1)

No.	Year	Tournament	Opponent(s)	Result
1	2008	Viking Classic	(United States) Will MacKenzie, (United States) Marc Turnesa	MacKenzie won with birdie on second extra hole Gay eliminated by birdie on first hole
2	2013	Humana Challenge	(United States) Charles Howell III, (Sweden) David Lingmerth	Won with birdie on second extra hole Lingmerth eliminated by birdie on first hole
3	2020	Bermuda Championship	(United States) Wyndham Clark	Won with birdie on first extra hole

=== Hooters Tour wins (1) ===
No.	Date	Tournament	Winning score	Margin of victory	Runner-up
1	Mar 12, 1995	Hooters Auburn Classic	−10 (69-69-69-71=278)	5 strokes	(United States) Rob McKelvey

=== Golden Bear Tour wins (3) ===
No.	Date	Tournament	Winning score	Margin of victory	Runner(s)-up
1	Jun 21, 1996	Golf Capital Magazine Tournament	−11 (69-66-70=205)	1 stroke	(United States) Adam Armagost, (United States) Gary Nicklaus
2	Sep 27, 1996	Golden Bear Tour Championship	−14 (67-69-70-68=274)	1 stroke	(United States) Ed Humenik
3	Jul 18, 1997	Canon Computer Systems Invitational	−10 (69-65-72=206)	1 stroke	(United States) Graham Davidson, (United States) Michael McNerney, (United States) Rick Price

=== Other mini-tour wins (5) ===
- 1995 Timbercreek Classic (Gulf Coast Tour), Killearn tournament (Emerald Coast Tour), St. Lucie West tournament (Gold Coast Tour), Emerald Dunes tournament (Gold Coast Tour), PGA Estates tournament (South Florida Tour)

=== Other wins (1) ===
- 1996 Key Biscayne Open

== Results in major championships ==
Results not in chronological order in 2020.

Tournament	1995	1996	1997	1998	1999
Masters Tournament					
U.S. Open	CUT				
The Open Championship					
PGA Championship					

Tournament	2000	2001	2002	2003	2004	2005	2006	2007	2008	2009
Masters Tournament										
U.S. Open	CUT		CUT	CUT	CUT					CUT
The Open Championship		CUT								CUT
PGA Championship		T22	T53	T51					T20	CUT

Tournament	2010	2011	2012	2013	2014	2015	2016	2017	2018
Masters Tournament	CUT			T38					
U.S. Open	CUT	T63							T20
The Open Championship	CUT						CUT		
PGA Championship	T65	CUT		CUT					79

Tournament	2019	2020	2021
Masters Tournament			CUT
PGA Championship	WD		81
U.S. Open			
The Open Championship		NT	

Did not play

CUT = missed the half-way cut
WD = withdrew
"T" = tied
NT = No tournament due to COVID-19 pandemic

=== Summary ===
Tournament	Wins	2nd	3rd	Top-5	Top-10	Top-25	Events	Cuts made
Masters Tournament	0	0	0	0	0	0	3	1
PGA Championship	0	0	0	0	0	2	11	7
U.S. Open	0	0	0	0	0	1	9	2
The Open Championship	0	0	0	0	0	0	4	0
Totals	0	0	0	0	0	3	27	10

- Most consecutive cuts made – 2 (twice)
- Longest streak of top-10s – 0

== Results in The Players Championship ==
Tournament	2001	2002	2003	2004	2005	2006	2007	2008	2009
The Players Championship	T40	T63	CUT		T75	CUT	CUT	T32	WD

Tournament	2010	2011	2012	2013	2014	2015	2016	2017	2018	2019
The Players Championship	CUT	T12	T46	CUT	CUT			CUT	T72	T56

Tournament	2020	2021	2022
The Players Championship	C	CUT	CUT

Did not play

CUT = missed the halfway cut
WD = withdrew
"T" indicates a tie for a place
C = Canceled after the first round due to the COVID-19 pandemic

== Results in World Golf Championships ==
Tournament	2009	2010	2011	2012	2013
Match Play		R16			
Championship		T30			T35
Invitational	79				T63
Champions	T25				T46

Top 10
Did not play

QF, R16, R32, R64 = Round in which player lost in match play
"T" indicates a tie for a place

== U.S. national team appearances ==
Amateur

- Walker Cup: 1993 (winners)

== See also ==
- 1998 PGA Tour Qualifying School graduates
- 1999 PGA Tour Qualifying School graduates
- 2003 PGA Tour Qualifying School graduates
- List of Florida Gators men's golfers on the PGA Tour
- List of University of Florida alumni
- List of University of Florida Athletic Hall of Fame members
