= Greg Owen (golfer) =

English professional golfer

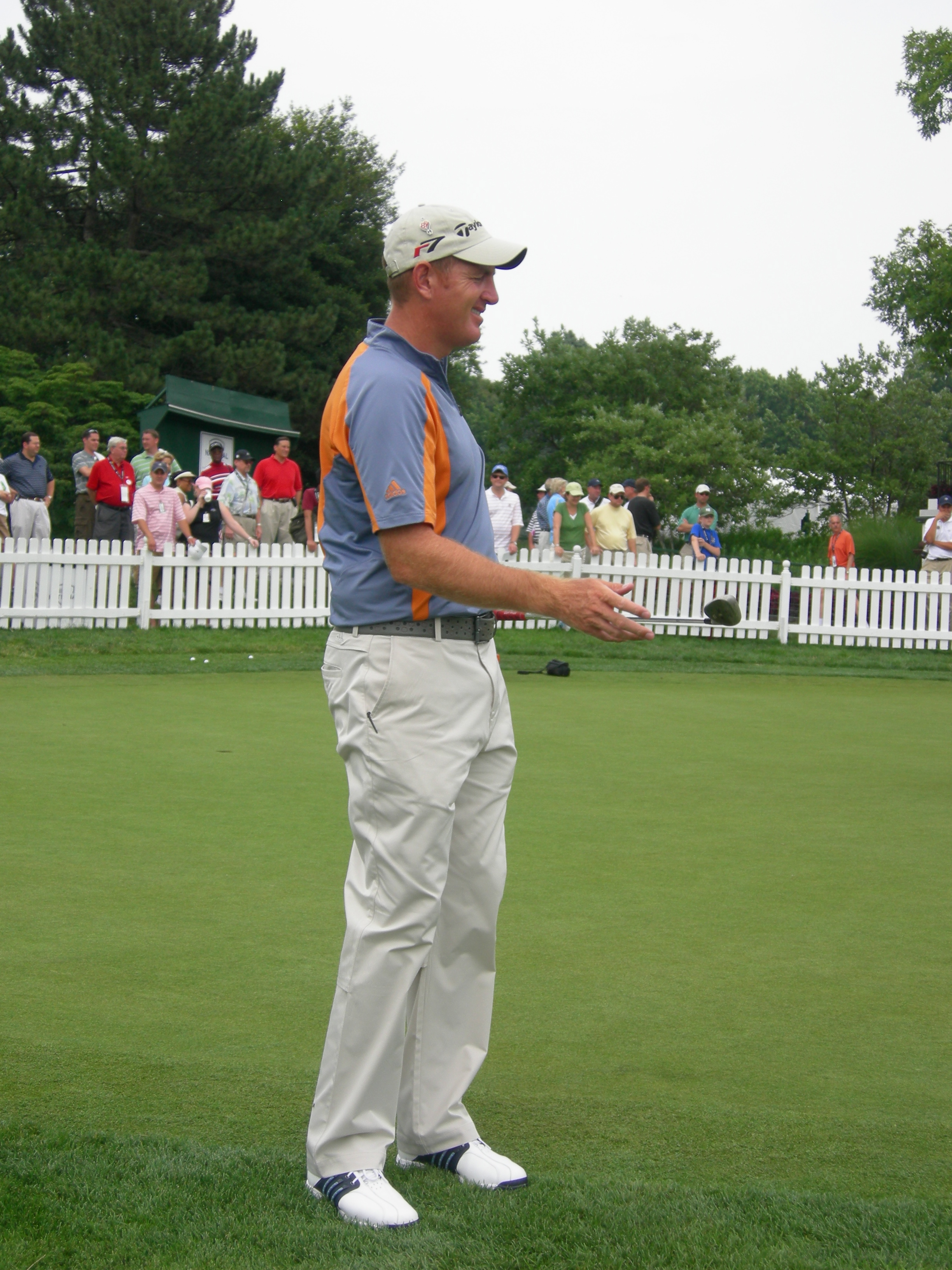

Personal information
- Full name: Gregory Clive Owen
- Nationality: England
- Born: 19 February 1972 (age 54) Mansfield, England
- Height: 6 ft 4 in (1.93 m)
- Weight: 206 lb (93 kg; 14.7 st)

Career
- Sport: Golf
- Turned professional: 1992
- Current tour: European Senior Tour
- Former tours: PGA Tour; European Tour; Web.com Tour; Challenge Tour
- Professional wins: 5
- Highest ranking: 49 (9 April 2006)

Number of wins by tour
- European Tour: 1
- Korn Ferry Tour: 1
- Challenge Tour: 1
- European Senior Tour: 2

Best results in major championships
- Masters Tournament: DNP
- PGA Championship: T47: 2005
- U.S. Open: DNP
- The Open Championship: T20: 2015

Gregory Clive Owen (born 19 February 1972) is an English professional golfer.

== Career ==
Owen was born in Mansfield, Nottinghamshire. He turned professional in 1992 and gained his European Tour card at the 1997 qualifying school. He finished in the top 100 of the Order of Merit every year from 1998 to 2004, and won for the first time on tour at the 2003 Daily Telegraph Damovo British Masters at his 158th tournament.

At the 2001 Open Championship, Owen notably became only the sixth golfer in the history of the competition to score a rare albatross (double eagle), on the par-5 11th hole at Royal Lytham.

Since 2005, Owen has played mainly in the United States being a full member of the PGA Tour in 2005–07, 2009–10 and 2012. His best finish in the United States was second at the 2006 Bay Hill Invitational, where he finished one shot behind Rod Pampling after playing the last two holes in three over par.

Having lost his PGA Tour card at the end of 2007, he bounced back the following season, to graduate directly from the second tier Nationwide Tour by finishing in 10th place on the money list.

In 2010 he finished 183rd on the PGA Tour money list and lost his card for the second time. In 2011 he played again on the Nationwide Tour, finishing 52nd on the money list. However he finished tied for 18th in the 2011 PGA Q School to regain his full PGA Tour card for 2012. He finished 85th in earnings in 2012, but was less successful in 2013, finishing 134th in the FedEx Cup.

In 2014 he split time between the PGA Tour and Web.com Tour; after winning the United Leasing Championship he finished 27th on the regular-season Web.com money list, missing out on a PGA Tour card by only $3,205. He went on to earn his card by finishing 10th on the Web.com Tour Finals money list.

Owen was in the top 50 of the Official World Golf Rankings for three weeks in 2006 with his highest ranking being 49.

== Professional wins (5) ==
=== European Tour wins (1) ===
| No. | Date | Tournament | Winning score | Margin of victory | Runners-up |
|---|---|---|---|---|---|
| 1 | 8 Jun 2003 | Daily Telegraph Damovo British Masters | −14 (68-68-67-71=274) | 3 strokes | (France) Christian Cévaër, (England) Ian Poulter |

=== Web.com Tour wins (1) ===
| No. | Date | Tournament | Winning score | Margin of victory | Runners-up |
|---|---|---|---|---|---|
| 1 | 29 Jun 2014 | United Leasing Championship | −9 (73-67-72-67=279) | 1 stroke | (United States) Ryan Armour, (United States) Mark Hubbard |

Web.com Tour playoff record (0–1)

| No. | Year | Tournament | Opponent | Result |
|---|---|---|---|---|
| 1 | 2008 | Athens Regional Foundation Classic | (United States) Robert Damron | Lost to birdie on first extra hole |

=== Challenge Tour wins (1) ===
| No. | Date | Tournament | Winning score | Margin of victory | Runner-up |
|---|---|---|---|---|---|
| 1 | 13 Jul 1996 | Gosen Challenge | −7 (69-70-72-70=281) | Playoff | (England) John Mellor |

Challenge Tour playoff record (1–0)

| No. | Year | Tournament | Opponent | Result |
|---|---|---|---|---|
| 1 | 1996 | Gosen Challenge | (England) John Mellor | Won with par on third extra hole |

=== European Senior Tour wins (2) ===
Legend
Tour Championships (1)
Other European Senior Tour (1)

| No. | Date | Tournament | Winning score | Margin of victory | Runner(s)-up |
|---|---|---|---|---|---|
| 1 | 7 Dec 2025 | MCB Mauritius Legends | −18 (65-68-65=198) | 1 stroke | (South Africa) Darren Fichardt, (India) Jeev Milkha Singh |
| 2 | 26 Apr 2026 | Barbados Legends | −16 (65-68-64=197) | 2 strokes | (Australia) Scott Hend |

== Playoff record ==
PGA Tour playoff record (0–1)

| No. | Year | Tournament | Opponents | Result |
|---|---|---|---|---|
| 1 | 2017 | Barracuda Championship | (United States) Chris Stroud, (United States) Richy Werenski | Stroud won with birdie on second extra hole Owen eliminated by birdie on first hole |

== Results in major championships ==
| Tournament | 1999 | 2000 | 2001 | 2002 | 2003 | 2004 | 2005 | 2006 | 2007 | 2008 | 2009 | 2010 | 2011 | 2012 | 2013 | 2014 | 2015 |
|---|---|---|---|---|---|---|---|---|---|---|---|---|---|---|---|---|---|
| Masters Tournament | | | | | | | | | | | | | | | | | |
| U.S. Open | | | | | | | | | | | | | | | | | |
| The Open Championship | CUT | T55 | T23 | CUT | CUT | | | T22 | | | | | | T54 | | | T20 |
| PGA Championship | | | | CUT | CUT | | T47 | CUT | | | | | | | | | |

Did not play

CUT = missed the half-way cut
"T" = tied

== Results in The Players Championship ==
| Tournament | 2006 | 2007 | 2008 | 2009 | 2010 | 2011 | 2012 | 2013 | 2014 | 2015 | 2016 |
|---|---|---|---|---|---|---|---|---|---|---|---|
| The Players Championship | T22 | CUT | | | CUT | | | CUT | | | CUT |

Did not play

CUT = missed the halfway cut
"T" indicates a tie for a place

== See also ==
- 2004 PGA Tour Qualifying School graduates
- 2008 Nationwide Tour graduates
- 2011 PGA Tour Qualifying School graduates
- 2014 Web.com Tour Finals graduates
