= Stadion Classic at UGA =

Tournament information
- Location: Athens, Georgia
- Established: 2006
- Course: University of Georgia Golf Course
- Par: 72
- Length: 7,240 yards (6,620 m)
- Tour: Web.com Tour
- Format: Stroke play
- Prize fund: US$600,000
- Month played: May
- Final year: 2013

Tournament record score
- Aggregate: 267 Paul Gow (2006); 267 Hudson Swafford (2012)
- To par: −21 Paul Gow (2006)

Final champion
- (United States) Brendon Todd
- Location in the United States Location in Georgia

The Stadion Classic at UGA was a golf tournament on the Web.com Tour. Founded in 2006 as the Athens Regional Foundation Classic, it was played at Jennings Mill Country Club in Bogart, Georgia from 2006 to 2009 and at the University of Georgia Golf Course in Athens, Georgia from 2010 to 2013. Three of the four editions held at the university course were won by former or active members of the school's golf team.

The 2013 purse was $600,000, with $108,000 for first place.

== Winners ==
Year	Winner	Score	To par	Margin of victory	Runner(s)-up
Stadion Classic at UGA
2013	(United States) Brendon Todd	205 (Note: Shortened to 54 holes due to weather.)	−8	1 stroke	(New Zealand) Tim Wilkinson
2012	(United States) Hudson Swafford	267	−17	1 stroke	(United States) Lee Janzen (United States) Luke List
2011	(United States) Russell Henley (a)	272	−12	2 strokes	(United States) Troy Kelly
2010	(United States) Martin Piller	272	−12	1 stroke	(United States) Daniel Summerhays
Athens Regional Foundation Classic
2009	(United States) Patrick Sheehan	274	−14	Playoff	(Australia) Michael Sim
2008	(United States) Robert Damron	277	−11	Playoff	(England) Greg Owen
2007	(Scotland) Martin Laird	272	−16	1 stroke	(United States) Jeremy Anderson (United States) Justin Bolli
2006	(Australia) Paul Gow	267	−21	3 strokes	(South Africa) Craig Lile
