= Zack Sucher =

American golfer

Personal information
- Full name: Zachary Albert Sucher
- Nationality: United States
- Born: October 2, 1986 (age 40) Atlanta, Georgia, U.S.
- Height: 6 ft 0 in (1.83 m)
- Weight: 210 lb (95 kg; 15 st)

Career
- Sport: Golf
- College: University of Alabama at Birmingham
- Turned professional: 2009
- Current tour: Korn Ferry Tour
- Former tour: PGA Tour
- Professional wins: 1

Number of wins by tour
- Korn Ferry Tour: 1

Best results in major championships
- Masters Tournament: DNP
- PGA Championship: DNP
- U.S. Open: CUT: 2021
- The Open Championship: DNP

Zachary Albert Sucher (born October 2, 1986) is an American professional golfer.

== Early life ==
Sucher was born in Atlanta, Georgia, but grew up in Mobile, Alabama. While attending St. Paul's Episcopal School, Sucher helped the men's golf team secure four straight Alabama Class 5A State Titles from 2001 to 2004. Sucher graduated from St. Paul's in 2005 and earned a four-year scholarship to play for the University of Alabama at Birmingham men's golf team.

== Professional career ==
Sucher turned professional in 2009 and played on the NGA Hooters Tour from 2010 to 2012. He played on the Web.com Tour in 2011 and 2013 to 2014. He won his first title in July 2014 at the Midwest Classic. He finished third on the Web.com Tour regular-season money list to earn his PGA Tour card for the 2014–15 season.

Sucher had a slew of injuries in 2017-18 that led to surgery to fix two ligaments and a tendon in his ankle. He returned to the PGA Tour in mid-2019.

On June 22, 2019, Sucher was leading the Travelers Championship by five strokes as he played the 10th hole of the third round. He proceeded to make bogey, double bogey, double bogey. At the same time, Chez Reavie made birdies on Nos. 10, 11, 12, 13 and 15. In a six-hole span, Sucher went from five up to four down. He entered the final round tied for second, six strokes behind Reavie. Sucher finished the tournament tied for second, earning $633,600 and moving to 126th in the season-long FedEx Cup. This concluded a nine-week stretch where Sucher went from being ranked 2045th in the world to 147th.

== Amateur wins ==
- 2008 Azalea Invitational

== Professional wins (1) ==
=== Web.com Tour wins (1) ===
No.	Date	Tournament	Winning score	To par	Margin of victory	Runner-up
1	Jul 27, 2014	Midwest Classic	66-63-64-72=265	−19	3 strokes	(United States) Aaron Watkins

== Results in major championships ==
Tournament	2021
Masters Tournament	
PGA Championship	
U.S. Open	CUT
The Open Championship	

Did not play

CUT = missed the half-way cut

== See also ==
- 2014 Web.com Tour Finals graduates
- 2016 Web.com Tour Finals graduates
