= Golden Bear Tour seasons =

This page lists all Golden Bear Tour seasons from its inaugural season in 1996.

Since 1996, all Golden Bear Tour's schedules have included events in Florida.

== 1996 season ==
=== Schedule ===
The following table lists official events during the 1996 season.

Date	Tournament	Location	Purse (US$)	Winner (Note: The number in parentheses after each winner's name is the number of Golden Bear Tour events they had won up to and including that tournament.)
Jun 12	Soundadvice Invitational	Hobe Sound, FL	75,000	(United States) Michael McNerney (1)
Jun 21	Golf Capital Magazine Tournament	Vero Beach, FL	75,000	(United States) Brian Gay (1)
Jun 27	Nicklaus/Flick School Classic	Vero Beach, FL	75,000	(United States) Steve Lamontagne (1)
Jul 10	Delta Air Lines Championship	Port St. Lucie, FL	75,000	(United States) Bobby Collins (1)
Jul 24	Canon Computer Systems Invitational	West Palm Beach, FL	75,000	(United States) Michael McNerney (2)
Aug 1	Nicklaus Open	Jupiter, FL	75,000	(United States) Adrian Stills (1)
Aug 8	DME Rangefinder Championship	Stuart, FL	75,000	(United States) Bob Duval (1)
Aug 15	Northern Trust Classic	Stuart, FL	75,000	(United States) Steve Lamontagne (2)
Aug 22	Lincoln-Mercury Invitational	Jupiter, FL	75,000	(United States) Bob Walzel (1)
Sep 6	Coca-Cola Classic	Jupiter, FL	75,000	(United States) Steve Lamontagne (3)
Sep 19	Maxfli Open	Jupiter, FL	75,000	(United States) Ed Humenik (1)
Sep 27	Golden Bear Tour Championship	Hobe Sound, FL	75,000	(United States) Brian Gay (2)

=== Money list ===
The money list was based on prize money won during the season, calculated in U.S. dollars.

Position	Player	Prize money ($)
1	(United States) Steve Lamontagne	72,628
2	(United States) Brian Gay	57,948
3	(United States) Bob Walzel	55,336
4	(United States) Michael McNerney	40,391
5	(United States) Adam Armagost	35,250

== 1997 season ==
=== Schedule ===
The following table lists official events during the 1997 season.

Date	Tournament	Location	Purse (US$)	Winner
Jun 5	WJNO-WRLX Championship	Stuart, FL	100,000	(United States) Stephen Anderson (1)
Jun 7	Bio-Back Championship	Palm City, FL	100,000	(United States) Lloyd Warwick (1)
Jun 11	Golf Capital Magazine Invitational	Port St. Lucie, FL	–	Canceled
Jun 13	Teardrop Championship	Palm City, FL	100,000	(United States) Rob Labritz (1)
Jun 18	DME Rangefinder Championship	Port St. Lucie, FL	100,000	(United States) David Ladd (1)
Jun 26	Marriott Championship	West Palm Beach, FL	100,000	(United States) Tim Cantwell (1)
Jul 3	Coca-Cola Classic	Stuart, FL	100,000	(United States) Adam Armagost (1)
Jul 10	Maxfli Open	Jupiter, FL	100,000	(United States) Mike Sposa (1)
Jul 18	Canon Computer Systems Invitational	Port St. Lucie, FL	100,000	(United States) Brian Gay (3)
Jul 23	Grand Slam Championship	Palm City, FL	100,000	(United States) Shawn Savage (1)
Aug 2	Northern Trust Classic	Jupiter, FL	100,000	(United States) Jerry Springer (1)
Aug 6	Nicklaus Open	Jupiter, FL	100,000	(United States) Bobby Collins (2)
Aug 15	American Airlines Invitational	Port St. Lucie, FL	100,000	(United States) Chris Stutts (1)
Aug 22	Nicklaus/Flick School Championship	West Palm Beach, FL	100,000	(United States) Mike Sposa (2)
Sep 5	Lincoln-Mercury Invitational	Jupiter, FL	100,000	(United States) D. J. Morris (1)
Sep 12	Columbia Treasure Coast Healthcare Championship	Port St. Lucie, FL	100,000	(United States) Chris Stutts (2)
Sep 18	Golden Bear Golf Centers Classic	Jupiter, FL	100,000	(United States) Bobby Collins (3)
Sep 25	Golden Bear Tour Championship	Hobe Sound, FL	100,000	(United States) Clark Burroughs (1)

=== Money list ===
The money list was based on prize money won during the season, calculated in U.S. dollars.

Position	Player	Prize money ($)
1	(United States) Chris Stutts	64,149
2	(United States) Mike Sposa	63,059
3	(United States) Bobby Collins	50,801
4	(United States) Adam Armagost	49,031
5	(United States) Clark Burroughs	41,684

== 1998 season ==
=== Schedule ===
The following table lists official events during the 1998 season.

Date	Tournament	Location	Purse (US$)	Winner
Jun 4	Ibis and Hammock Creek	Palm City, FL	132,000	(United States) Patrick Sheehan (1)
Jun 11	Canon-USA Open	Jensen Beach, FL	132,000	(United States) Rick Price (1)
Jun 18	Hammock Creek and Piper's Landing	Palm City, FL	132,000	(United States) Marco Dawson (1)
Jun 24	Hammock Creek and Martin Downs	Palm City, FL	132,000	(United States) Tom Carter (1)
Jul 8	Nicklaus Apparel Open	Stuart, FL	132,000	(United States) Adam Armagost (2)
Jul 16	Northern Trust Bank Classic	Jupiter, FL	132,000	(United States) Danny Ellis (1)
Jul 23	PGA North/South Reserve	Port St. Lucie, FL	132,000	(United States) Ryan Dillon (1)
Jul 31	Bear Lakes and Loxahatchee	Jupiter, FL	132,000	(United States) Marco Dawson (2)
Aug 6	Executive Sports Invitational	Stuart, FL	132,000	(United States) Shawn Savage (2)
Aug 13	Coca-Cola Classic	Jupiter, FL	132,000	(United States) Chris Kaufman (1)
Aug 21	Waterford Crystal Invitational	Jensen Beach, FL	132,000	(United States) Briny Baird (1)
Aug 28	Nicklaus Apparel Classic	Jupiter, FL	132,000	(United States) Patrick Sheehan (2)
Sep 11	Embassy Suites Classic	Jupiter, FL	132,000	(United States) Briny Baird (2)
~~Sep 18~~	Bear Lakes and Jonathan's Landing	Jupiter, FL	–	Canceled
Sep 25	Maxfli Classic	Port St. Lucie, FL	132,000	(United States) Patrick Sheehan (3)
Oct 2	Golden Bear Tour Championship	Jupiter, FL	254,500	(Puerto Rico) Miguel Suárez (1)

=== Money list ===
The money list was based on prize money won during the season, calculated in U.S. dollars.

Position	Player	Prize money ($)
1	(United States) Patrick Sheehan	164,353
2	(United States) Briny Baird	147,871
3	(United States) Marco Dawson	82,838
4	(United States) Danny Ellis	80,258
5	(United States) R. J. Nakashian	79,984

== 1999 season ==
=== Schedule ===
The following table lists official events during the 1999 season.

Date	Tournament	Location	Purse (US$)	Winner
Jun 4	Comcast Classic	Palm Beach Gardens, FL	130,000	(United States) Adam Armagost (3)
Jun 10	PGA National 1	Palm Beach Gardens, FL	–	Canceled
Jun 17	Hammock Creek and The Florida Club	Stuart, FL	130,000	(United States) Steve Hart (1)
Jun 24	PGA National 2	Palm Beach Gardens, FL	130,000	(United States) Danny Ellis (2)
Jul 8	Waterford Crystal Classic	Port St. Lucie, FL	130,000	(United States) Danny Ellis (3)
Jul 15	Embassy Suites Classic	Palm Beach Gardens, FL	130,000	(United States) Jeff Street (1)
Jul 22	Maxfli Classic	Palm City, FL	130,000	(United States) Jeff Burns (1)
Jul 29	Nicklaus Apparel Classic	Palm Beach Gardens, FL	130,000	(United States) Adam Spring (1)
Aug 6	Canon Classic	Port St. Lucie, FL	130,000	(United States) Jeff Street (2)
Aug 12	Ibis and Cypress Links	St. Petersburg, FL	130,000	(United States) Jeff Street (3)
~~Aug 20~~	St Andrews Classic	Port St. Lucie, FL	–	Canceled
Aug 27	PGA National 3	Palm Beach Gardens, FL	130,000	(United States) Chris Stutts (3)
Sep 10	SmartSpikes Classic	West Palm Beach, FL	130,000	(United States) Steve Hart (2)
~~Sep 17~~	Jonathan's Landing and Ibis	West Palm Beach, FL	–	Canceled
Sep 24	Northern Trust Bank Classic	Palm City, FL	130,000	(United States) Rick Heath (1)
Oct 1	Golden Bear Tour Championship	Jupiter, FL	275,000	(United States) Danny Ellis (4)

=== Money list ===
The money list was based on prize money won during the season, calculated in U.S. dollars.

Position	Player	Prize money ($)
1	(United States) Danny Ellis	133,008
2	(United States) Brett Wetterich	102,561
3	(United States) Jeff Street	100,412
4	(United States) Steve Hart	89,734
5	(United States) Rick Heath	77,289

== 2000 season ==
=== Schedule ===
The following table lists official events during the 2000 season.

Date	Tournament	Location	Purse (US$)	Winner
Jun 8	Jack Jolly Classic 1	West Palm Beach, FL	130,000	(United States) Adam Decker (1)
Jun 15	Waterford Crystal Classic	Palm City, FL	130,000	(United States) Brannon Sawyer (1)
Jun 22	Canon USA Classic	Port St. Lucie, FL	130,000	(United States) Tom Carter (2)
Jun 29	Nicklaus Apparel Classic	Jupiter, FL	130,000	(United States) Tom Carter (3)
Jul 13	Pepsi Cola Classic	Palm Beach Gardens, FL	130,000	(United States) Brendon Wilson (1)
Jul 20	Martin Downs and Hammock Creek	Palm City, FL	130,000	(United States) Anthony Ballestero (1)
Jul 27	PGA GC	Port St. Lucie, FL	130,000	(United States) Clint Jensen (1)
Aug 3	St Andrews Classic 1	Palm City, FL	130,000	(United States) Tim Petrovic (1)
Aug 10	Northern Trust Bank Classic	Palm Beach Gardens, FL	130,000	(United States) Bobby Collins (4)
Aug 17	Waterford Crystal Classic	Port St. Lucie, FL	130,000	(United States) Dan Stone (1)
Aug 24	Jack Jolly Classic 2	St. Petersburg, FL	130,000	(United States) Mike Malizia (1)
Aug 31	St Andrews Classic 2	Port St. Lucie, FL	130,000	(United States) Michael McNerney (3)
Sep 7	Aqua-Fina Classic	Port St. Lucie, FL	130,000	(United States) Tim Petrovic (2)
Sep 15	HealthSouth Challenge	Palm City, FL	130,000	(United States) Tim Petrovic (3)
Sep 22	HealthSouth Classic	Jupiter, FL	130,000	(United States) Tim Petrovic (4)
Sep 29	Golden Bear Tour Championship	Jupiter, FL	275,000	(United States) Reid Edstrom (1)

=== Money list ===
The money list was based on prize money won during the season, calculated in U.S. dollars.

Position	Player	Prize money ($)
1	(United States) Tim Petrovic	166,569
2	(United States) Reid Edstrom	87,899
3	(United States) Tom Carter	82,471
4	(United States) Mike Malizia	75,527
5	(United States) Bobby Collins	73,090

== 2001 season ==
=== Schedule ===
The following table lists official events during the 2001 season.

Date	Tournament	Location	Purse (US$)	Winner
Jun 8	Aqua-Fina Classic	Palm City, FL	120,000	(United States) Mike Pearson (1)
Jun 14	Waterford Crystal Classic	Port St. Lucie, FL	140,000	(United States) Dan Stone (2)
Jun 21	Canon USA Classic	Port St. Lucie, FL	140,000	(United States) Kris Maffet (1)
Jun 28	Nicklaus Apparel Classic	Palm Beach Gardens, FL	140,000	(United States) Todd Peluso (1)
Jul 12	St Andrews Classic	Port St. Lucie, FL	140,000	(United States) Chris Thompson (1)
Jul 19	Delta Air Lines Classic	Stuart, FL	140,000	(United States) Reid Edstrom (2)
Aug 9	Northern Trust Classic	Jupiter, FL	140,000	(United States) Hiroshi Matsuo (1)
Aug 16	Nicklaus Golf Equipment Classic	Port St. Lucie, FL	160,000	(United States) Reid Edstrom (3)
Aug 23	Ahead Classic	St. Petersburg, FL	160,000	(United States) Dan Stone (3)
Aug 31	St Andrews Challenge	Jupiter, FL	160,000	(United States) Chris Stutts (4)
Sep 7	Publix/Aquafina Classic	Port St. Lucie, FL	200,000	(United States) Brad Ott (1)
Sep 21	Publix/Aquafina Challenge	Jupiter, FL	200,000	(United States) Hiroshi Matsuo (2)
Sep 28	Golden Bear Tour Championship	Jupiter, FL	250,000	(United States) Hiroshi Matsuo (3)

=== Money list ===
The money list was based on prize money won during the season, calculated in U.S. dollars.

Position	Player	Prize money ($)
1	(United States) Hiroshi Matsuo	162,842
2	(United States) Reid Edstrom	98,781
3	(United States) Dan Stone	77,811
4	(United States) Kris Maffet	64,225
5	(United States) Chris Thompson	59,474

== 2002 season ==
=== Schedule ===
The following table lists official events during the 2002 season.

Date	Tournament	Location	Purse (US$)	Winner
Jun 7	Waterford Crystal Classic	Palm City, FL	150,000	(United States) Pleasant Hughes (1)
Jun 13	John O' Classic	Palm City, FL	150,000	(United States) P. J. Cowan (1)
Jun 20	Nicklaus Golf Equipment Classic	Weillington, FL	150,000	(United States) David Kirkpatrick (1)
Jun 26	Canon USA Classic	Port St. Lucie, FL	200,000	(United States) Steve Hart (3)
Jul 18	Ahead Classic	Palm Beach Gardens, FL	166,667	(United States) Reid Edstrom (4)
Jul 25	Northern Trust Classic	Port St. Lucie, FL	166,667	(United States) Steve Hart (4)
Aug 2	St. Andrew Products Classic	Port St. Lucie, FL	216,667	(United States) Reid Edstrom (5)
Aug 15	PLI Challenge	Palm City, FL	166,666	(United States) Hiroshi Matsuo (4)
Aug 23	Pepsi Challenge	West Palm Beach, FL	216,667	(United States) Greg Boyette (1)
Aug 30	John O' Challenge	Palm Beach Gardens, FL	166,665	(United States) Damian Hale (1)
Sep 5	St. Andrews Challenge	Palm City, FL	165,746	(United States) Cameron Yancey (1)
Sep 13	Golden Bear Tour Classic	Port St. Lucie, FL	215,438	(United States) Jeff Schmid (1)
Sep 19	PLI Classic	West Palm Beach, FL	165,745	(United States) Alan Zimmerman (1)
Sep 27	Golden Bear Tour Championship	Jupiter, FL	300,000	(United States) Hiroshi Matsuo (5)

=== Money list ===
The money list was based on prize money won during the season, calculated in U.S. dollars.

Position	Player	Prize money ($)
1	(United States) Hiroshi Matsuo	123,486
2	(United States) Steve Hart	119,346
3	(United States) Reid Edstrom	92,871
4	(United States) Greg Boyette	71,229
5	(United States) Pleasant Hughes	64,419

== 2003 season ==
=== Schedule ===
The following table lists official events during the 2003 season.

Date	Tournament	Location	Purse (US$)	Winner
Jun 6	John O' Classic	Hobe Sound, FL	150,000	(United States) Adam Armagost (4)
Jun 12	PLI Classic	Jupiter, FL	149,465	(United States) Jeff Schmid (2)
Jun 19	St. Andrews Classic	Port St. Lucie, FL	150,000	(United States) Hiroshi Matsuo (6)
Jun 27	Joey Dixon Classic	Port St. Lucie, FL	196,800	(United States) Hiroshi Matsuo (7)
Jul 10	Waterford Hotel Classic	Palm Beach Gardens, FL	149,427	(United States) Pleasant Hughes (2)
Jul 17	Pepsi Challenge	Palm City, FL	146,809	(United States) Del Ponchock (1)
Jul 24	Canon USA Classic	Wellington, FL	148,574	(United States) Will MacKenzie (1)
Aug 1	Waterford Crystal Classic	West Palm Beach, FL	198,079	(United States) Hernán Rey (1)
Aug 14	Nicklaus Golf Equipment Challenge	Palm Beach Gardens, FL	149,108	(United States) Jonathan Bartlett (1)
Aug 29	St. Andrews Challenge	Palm City, FL	236,237	(United States) David Kirkpatrick (2)
Sep 11	PLI Challenge	Vero Beach, FL	185,604	(United States) Ryan Armour (1)
Sep 19	Northern Trust Classic	Palm Beach Gardens, FL	236,236	(United States) Chris Peddicord (1)
Sep 25	John O' Challenge	Palm City, FL	183,960	(United States) Ryan LaVoie (1) (United States) Timothy O'Neal (1)
Oct 3	Golden Bear Tour Championship	Jupiter, FL	328,750	(United States) Michael Henderson (1)

=== Money list ===
The money list was based on prize money won during the season, calculated in U.S. dollars.

Position	Player	Prize money ($)
1	(United States) Michael Henderson	105,448
2	(United States) Hiroshi Matsuo	100,452
3	(United States) Chris Peddicord	87,930
4	(United States) Timothy O'Neal	76,834
5	(United States) Ryan LaVoie	67,370

== 2004 season ==
=== Schedule ===
The following table lists official events during the 2004 season.

Date	Tournament	Location	Purse (US$)	Winner
Jan 7	Waterford Crystal Classic 1	Summerfield, FL	54,287	(United States) Randy Leen (1)
Jan 17	Waterford Hotel Classic	Palm City, FL	59,812	(United States) Rob Labritz (2)
Jan 25	St Andrews Classic 1	Vero Beach, FL	45,473	(United States) Steve Marino (1)
Feb 11	Nicklaus Golf Equipment Classic 1	Palm City, FL	62,271	(United States) Steve Marino (2)
Feb 18	PLI Classic 1	Palm Beach Gardens, FL	64,220	(United States) Rick Heath (2)
Feb 25	St Andrews Classic 2	Wellington, FL	67,143	(United States) Steve Wheatcroft (1)
Feb 29	Sandridge	Vero Beach, FL	47,653	(United States) Steve Wheatcroft (2)
Mar 10	Aquafina Classic	Palm City, FL	48,347	(United States) Vince Covello (1)
Mar 17	Ahead Classic 1	Palm City, FL	63,245	(United States) David Ladd (2)
Mar 24	Pepsi Challenge	Wellington, FL	62,221	(United States) Jeff Barlow (1)
Mar 30	PGA National Estates 1	Palm Beach Gardens, FL	63,195	(United States) Michael McNerney (4)
Apr 7	PGA National Haig	Palm Beach Gardens, FL	11,100	(United States) Ken Macdonald (1)
Apr 14	Hammock Creek 1	Palm City, FL	10,280	(United States) Justin Hicks (1)
Apr 22	PGA National Estates 2	Palm Beach Gardens, FL	13,688	(United States) Justin Hicks (2)
Apr 28	Florida Club	Stuart, FL	9,643	(United States) Pleasant Hughes (3)
May 4	Ballantrae	Port St. Lucie, FL	12,700	(Japan) Akio Sadakata (1)
May 12	PGA GC	Palm Beach Gardens, FL	20,325	(United States) Jeff Barlow (2)
May 20	Eagle Marsh	Jensen Beach, FL	9,600	(United States) Hernán Rey (2)
May 28	Hammock Creek 2	Palm City, FL	16,150	(United States) Doug Wade (1)
Jun 4	St Andrews Classic 3	Jupiter, FL	134,122	(United States) Ryan LaVoie (2)
Jun 11	Ahead Classic 2	Palm City, FL	132,354	(United States) Hiroshi Matsuo (8)
Jun 18	Golden Bear Realty Classic	Port St. Lucie, FL	187,648	(United States) Del Ponchock (2)
Jun 25	PLI Classic 2	Palm Beach Gardens, FL	133,236	(United States) Ryan LaVoie (3)
Jul 2	Waterford Crystal Classic 2	Port St. Lucie, FL	135,000	(United States) Kyle Dobbs (1)
Jul 8	Canon Classic	Vero Beach, FL	134,360	(United States) Del Ponchock (3)
Jul 16	Golf Life Institute Classic	Stuart, FL	130,929	(United States) Mike San Filippo (1)
Jul 22	Waterford Challenge	Delray Beach, FL	135,000	(United States) Ryan LaVoie (4)
Jul 30	Nicklaus Golf Equipment Classic 2	Delray Beach, FL	187,648	(United States) Steve Marino (3)
Aug 13	Pepsi-Cola Challenge	West Palm Beach, FL	134,118	(United States) Pleasant Hughes (4)
Aug 19	Ernest Communications Classic	Palm Beach Gardens, FL	131,472	(United States) Dan Stone (4)
Aug 27	Vacation Express Classic	Stuart, FL	187,648	(United States) Lee Stroever (1)
Sep 24	Golden Bear Tour Championship	Jupiter, FL	306,325	(Japan) Akio Sadakata (2)

=== Money list ===
The money list was based on prize money won during the season, calculated in U.S. dollars.

Position	Player	Prize money ($)
1	(United States) Ryan LaVoie	86,950

== 2005 season ==
=== Schedule ===
The following table lists official events during the 2005 season.

Date	Tournament	Location	Purse (US$)	Winner
Jan 14	Hammock Creek 1	Palm City, FL	81,000	(United States) Michael McNerney (5)
Jan 21	Sandridge	Vero Beach, FL	79,200	(United States) Steve LeBrun (1)
Jan 28	Estates 1	Palm Beach Gardens, FL	81,000	(United States) Kevin Johnson (1)
Feb 4	Martin Downs	Palm City, FL	81,000	(Republic of Ireland) Sean Quinlivan (1)
Feb 16	Wellington	Wellington, FL	81,000	(United States) Steve Wheatcroft (3)
Feb 24	Estates 2	Palm Beach Gardens, FL	81,000	(United States) Steve Marino (4)
Mar 3	Fox Club	Palm City, FL	81,000	(United States) Steve Marino (5)
Mar 11	Madison Green	Royal Palm Beach, FL	85,050	(United States) Steve Wheatcroft (4)
Mar 23	Estates 3	Palm Beach Gardens, FL	79,200	(United States) Tim Turpen (1)
Apr 1	Hammock Creek 2	Palm City, FL	81,000	(United States) Steve Marino (6)
Apr 7	Champion	Palm Beach Gardens, FL	81,000	(United States) Ken Duke (1)
Apr 15	North	Port St. Lucie, FL	80,100	(United States) Justin Hicks (3)
