= Sam Saunders (golfer) =

American professional golfer (born 1987)

Personal information
- Full name: Samuel Palmer Saunders
- Nationality: United States
- Born: July 30, 1987 (age 39) Orlando, Florida, U.S.
- Height: 6 ft 0 in (1.83 m)
- Weight: 175 lb (79 kg; 12.5 st)

Career
- Sport: Golf
- College: Clemson University
- Turned professional: 2009
- Former tours: PGA Tour; Korn Ferry Tour

Best results in major championships
- Masters Tournament: DNP
- PGA Championship: DNP
- U.S. Open: T50: 2015
- The Open Championship: DNP

Samuel Palmer Saunders (born July 30, 1987) is an American professional golfer and the grandson of Arnold Palmer.

== Early life and amateur career ==
Saunders was born and raised in Orlando, Florida. His parents are Roy and Amy (née Palmer) Saunders. His mother is the younger daughter of Arnold Palmer.

Saunders attended high school at Trinity Prep in Winter Park. As a senior, he won his second club championship at Bay Hill Club and Lodge by seventeen strokes, which earned him an invitation to the 2006 PGA Tour event hosted by his grandfather. He attended Clemson University in South Carolina, and skipped his senior season to turn pro.

== Professional career ==
In 2011, he played a total of 13 events – eight on the PGA Tour, with a best finish of 15th at Pebble Beach – and the Nationwide Tour, where he finished tenth in Panama. That same year, Saunders made it to the final stage of the tour's qualifying school, but finished tied for 109th and did not earn a PGA Tour card. Saunders finished 50th on the 2012 Web.com Tour season in his first full professional season.

Saunders played on the Web.com Tour in 2014 after earning his tour card through qualifying school. He finished 13th in the Web.com Tour Finals to earn his PGA Tour card for the 2015 season. On September 29, 2017, he shot 59 in the first round of the Web.com Tour Championship, including a 6 birdie finish. In the 2017–18 PGA Tour season, Saunders earned $981,936 and placed 120th in the FedEx Cup standings. In the 2018–19 PGA Tour season, Saunders earned $413,887 and placed 173rd in the FedEx Cup standings.

In August 2019, Saunders suffered a compound fracture of the clavicle that was incurred in a motorized skateboard accident. Saunders stated he expected to be out for 4–6 months.

In August 2024, Saunders announced his retirement from professional golf.

== Personal life ==
In 2012, Saunders and his wife Kelly were married. They reside in Atlantic Beach, Florida, with their sons, Cohen and Ace

== Playoff record ==
PGA Tour playoff record (0–1)

| No. | Year | Tournament | Opponents | Result |
|---|---|---|---|---|
| 1 | 2015 | Puerto Rico Open | (Germany) Alex Čejka, (United States) Jon Curran, (Argentina) Emiliano Grillo, (United States) Tim Petrovic | Čejka won with birdie on first extra hole |

Korn Ferry Tour playoff record (0–1)

| No. | Year | Tournament | Opponents | Result |
|---|---|---|---|---|
| 1 | 2023 | Panama Championship | (United States) Pierceson Coody, (United States) Mac Meissner | Coody won with birdie on first extra hole |

== Results in major championships ==
| Tournament | 2011 | 2012 | 2013 | 2014 | 2015 | 2016 | 2017 | 2018 |
|---|---|---|---|---|---|---|---|---|
| Masters Tournament | | | | | | | | |
| U.S. Open | CUT | | | | T50 | | | |
| The Open Championship | | | | | | | | |
| PGA Championship | | | | | | | | |

| Tournament | 2019 |
|---|---|
| Masters Tournament | |
| PGA Championship | |
| U.S. Open | CUT |
| The Open Championship | |

Did not play

CUT = missed the half-way cut
"T" indicates a tie for a place

== See also ==
- 2014 Web.com Tour Finals graduates
- 2015 Web.com Tour Finals graduates
- 2017 Web.com Tour Finals graduates
- Lowest rounds of golf
