= Hudson Swafford =

American professional golfer (born 1987)

Personal information
- Full name: James Hudson Swafford
- Nationality: United States
- Born: September 9, 1987 (age 39) Tallahassee, Florida, U.S.
- Height: 6 ft 3 in (1.91 m)
- Weight: 200 lb (91 kg; 14 st)

Career
- Sport: Golf
- College: University of Georgia
- Turned professional: 2011
- Former tours: PGA Tour; Web.com Tour eGolf Professional Tour; LIV Golf
- Professional wins: 5
- Highest ranking: 61 (January 23, 2022) (as of October 25, 2026)

Number of wins by tour
- PGA Tour: 3
- Korn Ferry Tour: 1
- Other: 1

Best results in major championships
- Masters Tournament: T30: 2022
- PGA Championship: CUT: 2017, 2021, 2022
- U.S. Open: CUT: 2010, 2014
- The Open Championship: DNP

James Hudson Swafford (born September 9, 1987) is an American professional golfer. He formerly played on the PGA Tour, where he won three tournaments, until June 2022, when he joined LIV Golf.

== Early life and amateur career ==
In 1987, Swafford was born in Tallahassee, Florida. He graduated from Maclay School in Tallahassee. Swafford played his college golf at the University of Georgia. Swafford was a member of the Gridiron Secret Society. In 2011, he graduated receiving a B.S. in Consumer Economics.

== Professional career ==
In 2011, Swafford turned professional. He joined the Nationwide Tour, the PGA Tour's developmental tour, in 2012 and picked up his first victory at the Stadion Classic at UGA on May 6, shooting a course record 62 in the final round. Swafford trailed Luke List by a stroke heading to the final hole of the tournament, but he holed out his bunker shot for a birdie while List bogeyed to give him the victory. Swafford was familiar with the course as it is his former college course. Swafford played in the Web.com Tour Finals in 2013 and finished 21st to earn his PGA Tour card for 2014.

On January 22, 2017, Swafford recorded his first PGA Tour victory at the CareerBuilder Challenge. On September 27, 2020, Swafford won the Corales Puntacana Resort and Club Championship. He was playing with a Major Medical Extension after a rib injury and foot surgery.

On January 23, 2022, Swafford won The American Express in La Quinta, California for his third career PGA Tour win.

=== LIV Golf Series ===
After taking part in the inaugural LIV Golf event at Centurion Club near London in June 2022, Swafford had his PGA Tour membership indefinitely suspended. He switched from the Torque GC team to the Niblicks GC team after that first event. The team was rebranded as the RangeGoats GC by captain Bubba Watson for the 2023 LIV Golf League, with Swafford named as part of the lineup, but he ultimately sat out the season as he recovered from surgery on a hip injury. Having not been signed by a team, he was given one of the two wild card places for the 2024 season.

== Personal ==
Swafford is married to Katherine Wainwright Brandon.

== Amateur wins ==
- 2006 Dogwood Invitational

== Professional wins (5) ==
=== PGA Tour wins (3) ===
No.	Date	Tournament	Winning score	To par	Margin of victory	Runner-up
1	Jan 22, 2017	CareerBuilder Challenge	65-65-71-67=268	−20	1 stroke	(Canada) Adam Hadwin
2	Sep 27, 2020	Corales Puntacana Resort and Club Championship	65-67-69-69=270	−18	1 stroke	(United States) Tyler McCumber
3	Jan 23, 2022	The American Express (2)	70-65-66-64=265	−23	2 strokes	(United States) Tom Hoge

=== Web.com Tour wins (1) ===
No.	Date	Tournament	Winning score	To par	Margin of victory	Runners-up
1	May 6, 2012	Stadion Classic at UGA	66-70-69-62=267	−17	1 stroke	(United States) Lee Janzen, (United States) Luke List

=== eGolf Professional Tour wins (1) ===
No.	Date	Tournament	Winning score	To par	Margin of victory	Runner-up
1	Aug 13, 2011	HGM Hotels Classic	69-67-65-65=266	−21	1 stroke	(Brazil) Fernando Mechereffe

== Results in major championships ==
Results not in chronological order in 2020.

Tournament	2010	2011	2012	2013	2014	2015	2016	2017	2018
Masters Tournament								CUT	
U.S. Open	CUT				CUT				
The Open Championship									
PGA Championship								CUT	

! Tournament	2019	2020	2021	2022
Masters Tournament			CUT	T30
PGA Championship			CUT	CUT
U.S. Open				
The Open Championship		NT		

Did not play

CUT = missed the half-way cut
"T" = tied
NT = No tournament due to COVID-19 pandemic

== Results in The Players Championship ==
Tournament	2016	2017	2018	2019	2020	2021	2022
The Players Championship	T57	CUT	CUT		C	CUT	CUT

Did not play

CUT = missed the halfway cut
"T" indicates a tie for a place
C = Canceled after the first round due to the COVID-19 pandemic

== Results in World Golf Championships ==
Tournament	2017
Championship	
Match Play	
Invitational	T10
Champions	T50

Top 10
Did not play

"T" = tied

== See also ==
- 2013 Web.com Tour Finals graduates
- 2014 Web.com Tour Finals graduates
