= Briny Baird =

American professional golfer (born 1972)

Personal information
- Full name: Michael Jancey Baird
- Nickname: Briny
- Nationality: United States
- Born: May 11, 1972 (age 54) Miami Beach, Florida, U.S.
- Height: 5 ft 11 in (1.80 m)
- Weight: 185 lb (84 kg; 13.2 st)

Career
- Sport: Golf
- College: Georgia Institute of Technology; Valdosta State University
- Turned professional: 1995
- Former tours: PGA Tour; Buy.com Tour; Golden Bear Tour
- Professional wins: 3
- Highest ranking: 53 (April 4, 2004)

Number of wins by tour
- Korn Ferry Tour: 1
- Other: 2

Best results in major championships
- Masters Tournament: CUT: 2004, 2009
- PGA Championship: T22: 2001
- U.S. Open: T40: 2001
- The Open Championship: CUT: 2009

Michael Jancey "Briny" Baird (born May 11, 1972) is an American professional golfer who has played on the PGA Tour and Buy.com Tour.

== Early life ==
Baird was born in Miami Beach, Florida, the son of professional golfer Butch Baird. He played varsity golf in the 7th grade at Miami Country Day.

== Amateur career ==
Baird originally attended Georgia Tech before transferring to Valdosta State University where he won the NCAA Division II individual golf championship in 1994 and 1995.

== Professional career ==
In 1995, Baird turned professional. He won the 2000 Monterrey Open on the Buy.com Tour. He currently plays on the PGA Tour, but a poor 2005 season saw him lose his card. His highest placing to date on the end of year tour money list was 22nd in 2003. In 2008, he finished 27th in FedEx Cup, automatically qualifying him for the 2009 PGA Tour season. Although he has never won a PGA Tour event, he has finished second on six occasions, most recently at the 2013 McGladrey Classic.

Baird is known for his odd putting style that worked for him when he was doing it as a drill and it just stuck. On May 19, 2009, Baird hit a 230-yard shot from the top of the Omni San Diego Hotel to a bulls-eye in the center of Petco Park in order to give everyone a free chicken wrap at P. F. Chang's China Bistro.

In 2010, Baird entered the final event of the season 125th on the PGA Tour money list. He stumbled in the final round and a number of other players had better finishes. Baird finished 127th on the Tour, two spots out of retaining full Tour status.

In 2011, Baird nearly won his first PGA Tour event, the Frys.com Open. He lost on the sixth playoff hole to Bryce Molder. Despite the loss, the finish moved Baird from 148th to 93rd on the Tour's money list, which meant avoiding Q School.

Baird still has status on the PGA Tour via a medical exemption but he has not played a tour event since 2014.

Baird had the distinction of being the richest golfer never to win a PGA Tour event, earning over $13 million during his career, but coming up short six times. Cameron Tringale now holds that status, as Baird is currently 3rd on that list behind Tringale and also British golfer Brian Davis.

== Professional wins (3) ==
=== Buy.com Tour wins (1) ===
No.	Date	Tournament	Winning score	Margin of victory	Runner-up
1	Mar 13, 2000	Buy.com Monterrey Open	−20 (66-69-67-66=268)	4 strokes	(Australia) Mark Hensby

=== Golden Bear Tour wins (2) ===
No.	Date	Tournament	Winning score	Margin of victory	Runner-up
1	Aug 21, 1998	Waterford Crystal Invitational	−12 (65-68-71=204)	2 strokes	(United States) Patrick Sheehan
2	Sep 11, 1998	Embassy Suites Classic	−15 (68-66-67-70=271)	2 strokes	(United States) Robert Bilbo

== Playoff record ==
PGA Tour playoff record (0–1)

No.	Year	Tournament	Opponent	Result
1	2011	Frys.com Open	(United States) Bryce Molder	Lost to birdie on sixth extra hole

== Results in major championships ==
!Tournament	2001	2002	2003	2004	2005	2006	2007	2008	2009	2010	2011
Masters Tournament				CUT					CUT		
U.S. Open	T40			CUT					CUT		CUT
The Open Championship									CUT		
PGA Championship	T22	T43	T39	T37				T42	CUT		

Did not play

CUT = missed the half-way cut
"T" = tied

=== Summary ===
Tournament	Wins	2nd	3rd	Top-5	Top-10	Top-25	Events	Cuts made
Masters Tournament	0	0	0	0	0	0	2	0
U.S. Open	0	0	0	0	0	0	4	1
The Open Championship	0	0	0	0	0	0	1	0
PGA Championship	0	0	0	0	0	1	6	5
Totals	0	0	0	0	0	1	13	6

- Most consecutive cuts made – 4 (2001 U.S. Open – 2003 PGA)
- Longest streak of top-10s – 0

== Results in The Players Championship ==
Tournament	2002	2003	2004	2005	2006	2007	2008	2009	2010	2011	2012	2013	2014
The Players Championship	T49	T11	T33	T56		CUT	4	CUT	CUT		WD		WD

Top 10
Did not play

CUT = missed the halfway cut
WD = withdrew
"T" indicates a tie for a place

== Results in World Golf Championships ==
Tournament	2004	2005	2006	2007	2008	2009
Match Play	R64					
Championship						T31
Invitational						
Champions						

Did not play

QF, R16, R32, R64 = Round in which player lost in match play
"T" = Tied
Note that the HSBC Champions did not become a WGC event until 2009.

== See also ==
- 1998 PGA Tour Qualifying School graduates
- 2000 Buy.com Tour graduates
