= Ryan Armour =

American professional golfer (born 1976)

Personal information
- Full name: Ryan Patrick Armour
- Nationality: United States
- Born: February 27, 1976 (age 50) Akron, Ohio, U.S.
- Height: 5 ft 9 in (1.75 m)
- Weight: 170 lb (77 kg; 12 st)

Career
- Sport: Golf
- College: Ohio State University
- Turned professional: 1999
- Current tour: PGA Tour
- Former tours: Web.com Tour; Golden Bear Tour
- Professional wins: 3
- Highest ranking: 99 (March 24, 2019) (as of October 25, 2026)

Number of wins by tour
- PGA Tour: 1
- Korn Ferry Tour: 1
- Other: 1

Best results in major championships
- Masters Tournament: DNP
- PGA Championship: CUT: 2018, 2019
- U.S. Open: CUT: 2023
- The Open Championship: CUT: 2018

Ryan Patrick Armour (born February 27, 1976) is an American professional golfer.

== Early life ==
His father is David Armour and his mother is Jude Armour of Silver Lake, Ohio. His grandfather was Frank Armour Jr. of Pittsburgh, Pennsylvania who was president of H.J. Heinz Co.

== Amateur career ==
Armour attended Ohio State University. He earned third-team All-American honors in 1998 and was selected to the All-Big Ten squad in 1995 and 1998. He also made it to the 1993 U.S. Junior Amateur Golf Championship final, losing to Tiger Woods on the first playoff hole.

== Professional career ==
Armour played on the Nationwide Tour, now Korn Ferry Tour from 2004 to 2006. He also played on the NGA Hooters Tour in 2002 and 2003 and the Golden Bear Tour in 2003.

Armour earned his card for the 2007 PGA Tour season by finishing T13 at Q-School in 2006. He also qualified for the FedEx Cup in 2007.

After finishing 172nd on the PGA Tour money list in 2008, Armour lost his PGA Tour card and had to go back to the Nationwide Tour for 2009, where he played through 2012 and again in 2014. He finished 20th in the Web.com Tour regular season, then 40th in the Web.com Tour Finals to earn his PGA Tour card for the 2014–15 season.

In 2014–15, he finished 195th on the FedEx points list: 200th was the cutoff for a place in the Web.com Tour Finals. He then finished 41st (excluding the Top 25) in the Finals, to earn a Web.com Tour card for 2016.

In 2016, he won the first event of the Web.com Tour season, the Panama Claro Championship. It was his first win on the tour, in his 217th tournament. The next season, he won the Sanderson Farms Championship, his first PGA Tour win in his 105th start.

== Professional wins (3) ==
=== PGA Tour wins (1) ===
No.	Date	Tournament	Winning score	To par	Margin of victory	Runner-up
1	Oct 29, 2017	Sanderson Farms Championship	66-68-67-68=269	−19	5 strokes	(United States) Chesson Hadley

=== Web.com Tour wins (1) ===
No.	Date	Tournament	Winning score	To par	Margin of victory	Runner-up
1	Jan 31, 2016	Panama Claro Championship	70-69-65-64=268	−12	3 strokes	(United States) Kyle Thompson

=== Golden Bear Tour wins (1) ===
No.	Date	Tournament	Winning score	To par	Margin of victory	Runner-up
1	Sep 11, 2003	PLI Challenge	70-65-68=203	−13	Playoff	(United States) Ryan LaVoie

== Results in major championships ==
Results not in chronological order before 2019.

Tournament	2018	2019	2020	2021	2022	2023
Masters Tournament						
PGA Championship	CUT	CUT				
U.S. Open						CUT
The Open Championship	CUT		NT			

Did not play

CUT = missed the half-way cut
"T" = tied
NT = No tournament due to the COVID-19 pandemic

== Results in The Players Championship ==
Tournament	2008	2009
The Players Championship	WD	

Tournament	2010	2011	2012	2013	2014	2015	2016	2017	2018	2019
The Players Championship									CUT	CUT

Tournament	2020	2021	2022	2023
The Players Championship	C	T55		CUT

Did not play

CUT = missed the halfway cut
WD = withdrew
C = Canceled after the first round due to the COVID-19 pandemic

== See also ==
- 2006 PGA Tour Qualifying School graduates
- 2014 Web.com Tour Finals graduates
- 2016 Web.com Tour Finals graduates
- 2017 Web.com Tour Finals graduates
- 2022 Korn Ferry Tour Finals graduates
