= Dudley Hart =

American professional golfer (born 1968)

Personal information
- Full name: Howard Dudley Hart
- Nationality: United States
- Born: August 4, 1968 (age 58) Rochester, New York, U.S.
- Height: 5 ft 10 in (1.78 m)
- Weight: 190 lb (86 kg; 14 st)

Career
- Sport: Golf
- College: University of Florida
- Turned professional: 1990
- Current tour: PGA Tour Champions
- Former tour: PGA Tour
- Professional wins: 6
- Highest ranking: 21 (April 23, 2000)

Number of wins by tour
- PGA Tour: 2
- Other: 4

Best results in major championships
- Masters Tournament: T28: 2000
- PGA Championship: T6: 1993
- U.S. Open: T12: 2002
- The Open Championship: T37: 1999, 2001

Achievements and awards
- PGA Tour Comeback Player of the Year: 2008

Howard Dudley Hart (born August 4, 1968) is an American professional golfer. He won two PGA Tour events among an injury-riddled career.

== Early life ==
Hart was born in Rochester, New York. He attended Archbishop Curley-Notre Dame High School in Miami, Florida.

== Amateur career ==
Hart accepted an athletic scholarship to attend the University of Florida in Gainesville, Florida. He was a member of coach Lynn Blevin and coach Buddy Alexander's Florida Gators men's golf teams from 1987 to 1990. In 1987, Hart earned honors as the Southeastern Conference Freshman of the Year. He was also a three-time first-team All-SEC selection and a four-time All-American. Hart was also a member of the Gators' 1989 SEC championship team.

== Professional career ==
In 1990, Hart turned pro. He joined the PGA Tour the following year. His first win came in 1996 at the rain-shortened Bell Canadian Open, his 160th PGA Tour start. His second win was at the 2000 Honda Classic. Hart also finished in a three-way tie for first in the 2004 EDS Byron Nelson Championship, which he and Robert Damron lost in a playoff to Sergio García.

Although Hart has only won two PGA tournaments, he was one of the most consistent players on the Tour. From 1991 to 2009, Hart had 55 top-10 finishes, including four runner-up finishes. His best finish in a major was sixth place tie at the 1993 PGA Championship. He was injured in 2003 and had to limit his play to twenty-two starts due to a herniated disc in his back. In 2007, Hart had to take six months off from the Tour in order to care for his wife and children while his wife, Suzanne, had a softball-sized tumor removed from her lungs. He played on the Tour in 2008 using a major medical exemption. In what turned out to be his best year ever, Hart earned more than $2 million and was awarded the Tour's Comeback of the Year award. His career high Official World Golf Ranking is 21st, achieved in April 2000.

In 2009, Hart had spinal fusion surgery, which prevented him from playing on the PGA Tour in 2010 and 2011. He attempted a comeback at the 2011 Australian Open, but was forced to withdraw after three rounds. He attempted one event in 2012, the AT&T Pebble Beach National Pro-Am, but missed the cut and made no PGA Tour starts in 2013 after additional back surgery. He was granted 12 more starts to earn $504,824 and satisfy a Major Medical Exemption in order to regain his Tour card.

In 2013, Hart played in Canada (missed cut at Wildfire Invitational) and Argentina (T13 at Personal Classic, his first professional cut since May 2009). In 2014, Hart made his first PGA Tour cut in almost five years, at the AT&T Pebble Beach National Pro-Am with a T35 finish. Overall, Hart made four PGA Tour starts (made two cuts) and tried to use his medical extension to play on the Web.com Tour Finals, but did not make a cut. He entered the 2014–15 season with eight starts and $464,067 to retain his PGA Tour card. He was unable to satisfy his medical exemption and demoted to the Past Champions category.

Hart became eligible for PGA Tour Champions in August 2018.

== Personal life ==
Hart is married to Suzanne. They have four children. A set of triplets: Ryan, Rachel and Abigail who were born on 2001 and Avery, a daughter born 2010. He enjoys fishing and reading, and is a fan of professional hockey.

Hart lives in Buffalo, New York.

== Awards and honors ==
- In 1987, Hart earned honors as the Southeastern Conference's (SEC) Freshman of the Year honors while attending the University of Florida.
- He was also a three-time first-team All-SEC selection. In addition, he earned All-American honors all four years while at the University of Florida.
- In 2003, Hart was inducted into the University of Florida Athletic Hall of Fame as a "Gator Great."
- In 2008, Hart earned the PGA Tour Comeback Player of the Year award.

== Professional wins (6) ==
=== PGA Tour wins (2) ===
No.	Date	Tournament	Winning score	Margin of victory	Runner(s)-up
1	Sep 7, 1996	Bell Canadian Open	−14 (68-64-70=202) (Note: Shortened to 54 holes due to weather.)	1 stroke	(United States) David Duval
2	Mar 11, 2000	Honda Classic	−19 (65-69-70-65=269)	1 stroke	(United States) J. P. Hayes, (United States) Kevin Wentworth

PGA Tour playoff record (0–1)

No.	Year	Tournament	Opponents	Result
1	2004	EDS Byron Nelson Championship	(United States) Robert Damron, (Spain) Sergio García	García won with par on first extra hole

=== Other wins (4) ===
- 1990 Florida Open, Louisiana Open
- 1998 Subaru Sarazen World Open (unofficial event in Georgia, USA)
- 2002 CVS Charity Classic (with Chris DiMarco)

== Results in major championships ==
Tournament	1992	1993	1994	1995	1996	1997	1998	1999
Masters Tournament			CUT			CUT		
U.S. Open	T23						WD	T17
The Open Championship						CUT	81	T37
PGA Championship	CUT	T6	T55			CUT	T44	CUT

Tournament	2000	2001	2002	2003	2004	2005	2006	2007	2008	2009
Masters Tournament	T28	T43								T44
U.S. Open	CUT	T62	T12	CUT	T53					
The Open Championship	WD	T37	CUT	CUT						
PGA Championship	WD	T16	CUT		WD	T10	WD			

Top 10
Did not play

WD = withdrew
CUT = missed the half-way cut
"T" indicates a tie for a place

=== Summary ===
Tournament	Wins	2nd	3rd	Top-5	Top-10	Top-25	Events	Cuts made
Masters Tournament	0	0	0	0	0	0	5	3
U.S. Open	0	0	0	0	0	3	8	5
The Open Championship	0	0	0	0	0	0	7	3
PGA Championship	0	0	0	0	2	3	12	5
Totals	0	0	0	0	2	6	32	16

- Most consecutive cuts made – 5 (2001 Masters – 2002 U.S. Open)
- Longest streak of top-10s – 1 (twice)

== Results in The Players Championship ==
Tournament	1992	1993	1994	1995	1996	1997	1998	1999	2000	2001	2002	2003	2004	2005	2006	2007	2008	2009
The Players Championship	CUT	WD	CUT			CUT	T25	T38	WD	CUT	T49	T62		T63	T45		CUT	WD

Did not play

CUT = missed the halfway cut
WD = withdrew
"T" indicates a tie for a place

== Results in World Golf Championships ==
Tournament	1999	2000	2001	2002	2003	2004	2005	2006	2007	2008	2009
Match Play	R64	R64	R16								
Championship	3	T48	NT^{1}								T61
Invitational											
Champions											

^{1}Cancelled due to 9/11

Top 10
Did not play

QF, R16, R32, R64 = Round in which player lost in match play
"T" = Tied
NT = No tournament
Note that the HSBC Champions did not become a WGC event until 2009.

== Results in senior major championships ==
Tournament	2019	2020	2021
The Tradition	WD	NT	
Senior PGA Championship	CUT	NT	T40
Senior Players Championship		T10	WD
U.S. Senior Open		NT	
Senior British Open Championship	T36	NT	

Top 10
Did not play

"T" indicates a tie for a place
WD = withdrew
NT = No tournament due to COVID-19 pandemic

== See also ==
- 1990 PGA Tour Qualifying School graduates
- 1994 PGA Tour Qualifying School graduates
- List of Florida Gators men's golfers on the PGA Tour
- List of golfers with most PGA Tour wins
- List of University of Florida Athletic Hall of Fame members
