= Craig Dolch =

American sportswriter and broadcaster

Craig Dolch (b. Nov. 11, 1958, Jacksonville, Florida) is an American sportswriter and broadcaster for radio and television. Dolch has written articles for many national and international publications, and has appeared numerous times on the Golf Channel.

== Career ==
Born in Florida, Dolch graduated from the University of Florida Journalism School in 1980. In 1982, he started working for the Palm Beach Post. Dolch covered professional golf, the Miami Dolphins and the Florida Gators.

In 2008, after taking a buyout from the Post, Dolch became a freelance journalist. He has contributed sports articles to The New York Times, the London Times, Sports Illustrated, Golf World and USA TODAY.

Dolch has appeared over 200 times on Golf Channel shows, including Viewer’s Forum and Grey Goose 19th Hole. He co-hosted a two-hour radio golf show, Golf Exchange, from 2011-2018.

== Encephalitis Foundation ==
In 2005, Dolch’s son, Eric, then 14, contracted encephalitis while Dolch was covering the U.S. Open at Pinehurst Country Club. Eric spent a 115 days in a medically-induced coma at Nicklaus Children’s Hospital and was left severely disabled after a pair of 10-hour brain operations.

In 2006, Dolch created the Eric Dolch Children’s Encephalitis Foundation, a non-profit that has raised more than $100,000 for special needs children and adults in South Florida.

== Recognition ==
- In 2014, Dolch was named Father of the Year by Golfweek.
- In 2016, Dolch was inducted into the Palm Beach County Sports Hall of Fame.
- In 2020, Dolch received the Steven C. Owen Award from the Indian River Golf Foundation.
