= Robert Damron =

American professional golfer (born 1972)

Personal information
- Full name: Robert Douglas Damron
- Nationality: United States
- Born: October 27, 1972 (age 54) Pikeville, Kentucky, U.S.
- Height: 5 ft 8 in (1.73 m)
- Weight: 185 lb (84 kg; 13.2 st)

Career
- Sport: Golf
- College: University of Central Florida
- Turned professional: 1994
- Former tours: PGA Tour; Web.com Tour
- Professional wins: 2
- Highest ranking: 76 (May 13, 2001)

Number of wins by tour
- PGA Tour: 1
- Korn Ferry Tour: 1

Best results in major championships
- Masters Tournament: DNP
- PGA Championship: T66: 2001
- U.S. Open: T20: 2003
- The Open Championship: CUT: 1997

Robert Douglas Damron (born October 27, 1972) is an American professional golfer, who has played on the PGA Tour. He is a studio analyst for the Golf Channel.

== Early life ==
Damron was born in Pikeville, Kentucky and raised there and later in Orlando, Florida after his father, a wealthy Kentucky coal magnate, moved the family to Bay Hill. Damron had the benefit of some early advice about golf from Bay Hill neighbor Arnold Palmer. He attended Orlando's Dr. Phillips High School graduating in 1990.

== Amateur career ==
Damron later attended the University of Central Florida in Orlando from 1991 to 1994, where he was a distinguished member of the golf team, earning All-American honors three times. He won five collegiate events while at UCF. Damron was inducted into the UCF Athletics Hall of Fame in 2002.

== Professional career ==
Damron turned pro in 1994. He has won one PGA Tour event, the 2001 Verizon Byron Nelson Classic. He finished in a three-way tie for first in the same tournament in 2004 (it was called the EDS Byron Nelson Championship that year), which he and Dudley Hart lost in a playoff to Sergio García. His best finish in a major is a T-20 at the 2003 U.S. Open. After turning 35, Damron played mostly on the Web.com Tour.

== Personal life ==
Damron's brother, Patrick, is also a professional golfer. He lives in Orlando.

== Awards and honors ==
In 2002, Damron was inducted into the University of Central Florida's Athletics Hall of Fame

== Professional wins (2) ==
=== PGA Tour wins (1) ===
No.	Date	Tournament	Winning score	Margin of victory	Runner-up
1	May 13, 2001	Verizon Byron Nelson Classic	−17 (66-64-67-66=263)	Playoff	(United States) Scott Verplank

PGA Tour playoff record (1–1)

No.	Year	Tournament	Opponent(s)	Result
1	2001	Verizon Byron Nelson Classic	(United States) Scott Verplank	Won with birdie on fourth extra hole
2	2004	EDS Byron Nelson Championship	(Spain) Sergio García, (United States) Dudley Hart	García won with par on first extra hole

=== Nationwide Tour wins (1) ===
No.	Date	Tournament	Winning score	Margin of victory	Runner-up
1	Apr 20, 2008	Athens Regional Foundation Classic	−11 (70-69-72-66=277)	Playoff	(England) Greg Owen

Nationwide Tour playoff record (1–0)

No.	Year	Tournament	Opponent	Result
1	2008	Athens Regional Foundation Classic	(England) Greg Owen	Won with birdie on first extra hole

== Results in major championships ==
Tournament	1997	1998	1999	2000	2001	2002	2003
U.S. Open				63	CUT		T20
The Open Championship	CUT						
PGA Championship	CUT	CUT		T74	T66		

Note: Damron never played in the Masters Tournament.

Did not play

CUT = missed the half-way cut
"T" = tied

== Results in The Players Championship ==
Tournament	1997	1998	1999	2000	2001	2002	2003	2004	2005	2006
The Players Championship	T53	CUT	T52	T3	CUT	74	CUT	CUT	T63	CUT

Top 10

CUT = missed the halfway cut
"T" indicates a tie for a place

== See also ==
- 1996 PGA Tour Qualifying School graduates
