= Puerto Rico Open =

Golf tournament

Coordinates: 18.405°N 65.799°W

Tournament information
- Location: Río Grande, Puerto Rico
- Established: 2008
- Course: Grand Reserve Country Club
- Par: 72
- Length: 7,506 yards (6,863 m)
- Tour: PGA Tour (alternate event)
- Format: Stroke play
- Prize fund: US$4,000,000
- Month played: March
- Website: puertoricoopen.golf

Tournament record score
- Aggregate: 262 Karl Vilips
- To par: −26 as above

Current champion
- (United States) Ricky Castillo

Final champion
- Location in Puerto Rico

The Puerto Rico Open is a professional golf tournament on the PGA Tour that was first played in 2008. It is the only PGA Tour event held in Puerto Rico to date. The tournament is played at the Coco Beach Golf Course (previously Trump International Golf Club Puerto Rico) which was designed by Tom Kite. From its inception through 2015, it was played in early March as an alternate event to the WGC-Cadillac Championship, but in 2016 it moved to late March, opposite the WGC-Dell Match Play. All four rounds are broadcast on the Golf Channel.

The winner of the Puerto Rico Open earns 300 FedEx Cup points and 24 OWGR points, compared to 550 FedEx Cup and 70-80 OWGR points for World Golf Championships. As an alternate event, the winner does not earn a bid to the Masters, but receives a two-year exemption on the PGA Tour (compared to three for a WGC event) and entry into the PGA Championship as a Tour winner. In 2015, the prize fund was US$3 million with $540,000 going to the winner.

The Puerto Rico Open is allocated eight additional sponsor exemptions. Four of these are designated for players from Puerto Rico, the Caribbean, Central America and South America. The other four additional exemptions are unrestricted.

== History ==
A Puerto Rico Open was played between 1956 and 1967. It was a fixture on the PGA-sponsored Caribbean Tour until 1965, after which sponsors rescheduled the event to later in the calendar year. The Puerto Rico Open was revived as a stop on the Tour de las Américas 2004 and 2005, before being reincarnated as a PGA Tour event in 2008.

For 2018 only, the Puerto Rico Open was an unofficial event as a fundraiser for relief efforts after Hurricane Maria, and was played at TPC Dorado Beach.

The event had been considered to have an unofficial "curse" on the PGA Tour, as no winner of the event had ever gone on to win another tournament. The only exception to this was Michael Bradley who won the Puerto Rico Open for a second time in 2011, after winning his first in 2009, but never won another PGA Tour event. However, Viktor Hovland broke the "curse" when he went on to win the Mayakoba Golf Classic in December 2020, having won the Puerto Rico Open earlier in the year. 2016 winner Tony Finau matched the feat when he won The Northern Trust in 2021.

== Winners ==
Year	Tour (Note: PGAT − PGA Tour; TLA − Tour de las Américas.)	Winner	Score	To par	Margin of victory	Runner(s)-up	Purse ($)	Winner's share ($)	Ref.
Puerto Rico Open
2026	PGAT	(United States) Ricky Castillo	271	−17	1 stroke	(United States) Chandler Blanchet	4,000,000	720,000	
2025	PGAT	(Australia) Karl Vilips	262	−26	3 strokes	(Denmark) Rasmus Neergaard-Petersen	4,000,000	720,000	
2024	PGAT	(United States) Brice Garnett	269	−19	Playoff	(United States) Erik Barnes	4,000,000	720,000	
2023	PGAT	(Colombia) Nico Echavarría	267	−21	2 strokes	(United States) Akshay Bhatia	3,800,000	684,000	
2022	PGAT	(United States) Ryan Brehm	268	−20	6 strokes	(United States) Max McGreevy	3,700,000	666,000	
2021	PGAT	(South Africa) Branden Grace	269	−19	1 stroke	(Venezuela) Jhonattan Vegas	3,000,000	540,000	
2020	PGAT	(Norway) Viktor Hovland	268	−20	1 stroke	(United States) Josh Teater	3,000,000	540,000	
2019	PGAT	(United States) Martin Trainer	275	−15	3 strokes	(Australia) Aaron Baddeley (United States) Daniel Berger (Canada) Roger Sloan (United States) Johnson Wagner	3,000,000	540,000	
2018: No tournament
2017	PGAT	(United States) D. A. Points	268	−20	2 strokes	(United States) Bryson DeChambeau (South Africa) Retief Goosen (United States) Bill Lunde	3,000,000	540,000	
2016	PGAT	(United States) Tony Finau	276	−12	Playoff	(United States) Steve Marino	3,000,000	540,000	
2015	PGAT	(Germany) Alex Čejka	281	−7	Playoff	(United States) Jon Curran (Argentina) Emiliano Grillo (United States) Tim Petrovic (United States) Sam Saunders	3,000,000	540,000	
2014	PGAT	(United States) Chesson Hadley	267	−21	2 strokes	(New Zealand) Danny Lee	3,500,000	630,000	
2013	PGAT	(United States) Scott Brown	268	−20	1 stroke	(Argentina) Fabián Gómez (United States) Jordan Spieth	3,500,000	630,000	
2012	PGAT	(United States) George McNeill	272	−16	2 strokes	(Japan) Ryo Ishikawa	3,500,000	630,000	
2011	PGAT	(United States) Michael Bradley (2)	272	−16	Playoff	(United States) Troy Matteson	3,500,000	630,000	
2010	PGAT	(United States) Derek Lamely	269	−19	2 strokes	(United States) Kris Blanks	3,500,000	630,000	
2009	PGAT	(United States) Michael Bradley	274	−14	1 stroke	(Australia) Jason Day (United States) Brett Quigley	3,500,000	630,000	
2008	PGAT	(United States) Greg Kraft	274	−14	1 stroke	(United States) Jerry Kelly (United States) Bo Van Pelt	3,500,000	630,000	
2006−07: No tournament
American Express Puerto Rico Open
2005	TLA	(Argentina) Daniel Barbetti	268	−20	Playoff	(Argentina) Eduardo Argiró	125,000	22,500	
2004	TLA	(Argentina) Rodolfo González	282	−6	1 stroke	(Argentina) Eduardo Argiró (Canada) David Morland IV	110,000	19,890	
Puerto Rico Open
1968−2003: No tournament
1967		(United States) Chuck Courtney	280	−8	2 strokes	(United States) Art Wall Jr.			
1966		(Spain) Ramón Sota	284	−4	2 strokes	(United States) Bill Collins			
1965		(United States) Howell Fraser	288	E	1 stroke	(United States) Al Besselink (United States) Art Wall Jr.			
1964		(United States) Art Wall Jr.	289	+1	Playoff	(United States) Jay Dolan			
1963		(United States) Charlie Sifford	277	−7	6 strokes	(Canada) George Knudson			
1962		(Canada) George Knudson	280	−4	2 strokes	(United States) Al Geiberger (United States) Tony Lema (United States) Don Whitt (United States) Henry Williams Jr.			
1961		(United States) Billy Maxwell	273	−11	7 strokes	(Argentina) Roberto De Vicenzo			
1960		(United States) Joe Jimenez	280	−4	Playoff	(Canada) Stan Leonard			
1959		(United States) Pete Cooper	282	−6	5 strokes	(United States) Ed Oliver			
1958		(United States) Bob Toski	288	E	2 strokes	(United States) Ernie Vossler			
1957		(United States) Chick Harbert	281	−7	2 strokes	(Argentina) Roberto De Vicenzo			
1956		(Argentina) Antonio Cerdá	144 (Note: Shortened to 36 holes due to rain.)	E	5 strokes	(United States) Herman Barron (Republic of Ireland) Dick Ferguson			

Note: Green highlight indicates scoring records.

== See also ==
- Open golf tournament
