= Tim Petrovic =

American professional golfer

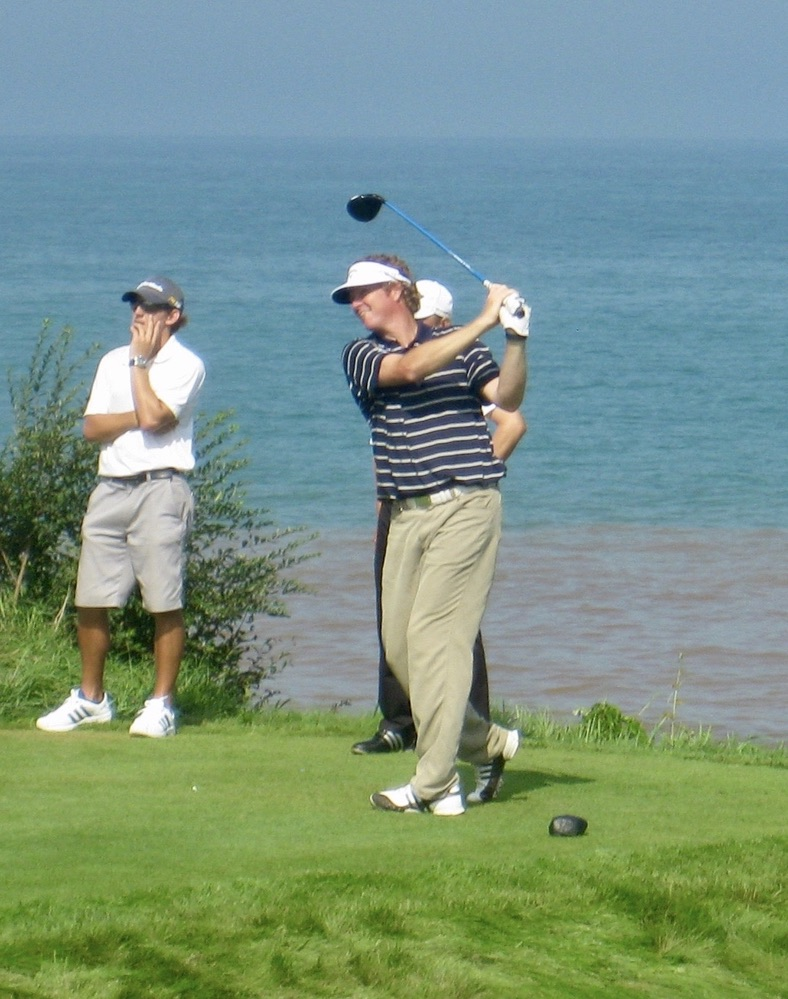
- Petrovic at the 2010 PGA Championship

Personal information
- Nationality: United States
- Born: August 16, 1966 (age 60) Northampton, Massachusetts, U.S.
- Height: 6 ft 2 in (1.88 m)
- Weight: 195 lb (88 kg; 13.9 st)
- Spouse: Julie
- Children: 2

Career
- Sport: Golf
- College: University of Hartford
- Turned professional: 1988
- Current tour: PGA Tour Champions
- Former tours: PGA Tour; Web.com Tour; Golden Bear Tour
- Professional wins: 5
- Highest ranking: 65 (May 22, 2005)

Number of wins by tour
- PGA Tour: 1
- Other: 4

Best results in major championships
- Masters Tournament: T41: 2004
- PGA Championship: CUT: 2003, 2004, 2005, 2009, 2010
- U.S. Open: T15: 2003
- The Open Championship: CUT: 2002, 2005, 2008, 2010

Achievements and awards
- Golden Bear Tour money list winner: 2000

Tim Petrovic (born August 16, 1966) is an American professional golfer. He won one PGA Tour event, and has finished runner-up in four senior major golf championships.

== Early life and amateur career ==
Petrovic was born in Northampton, Massachusetts. He played college golf for the Hartford Hawks, and was an NCAA Division I All-American selection in 1988. Petrovic was a teammate of future PGA Tour professional Jerry Kelly.

== Professional career ==
Petrovic turned professional in 1988. He played on the PGA Tour's developmental tour in 1993, 1999, and 2001. After a successful season on the Buy.com Tour in 2001 he first earned his PGA Tour card for the 2002 season. Petrovic won one PGA Tour event, the 2005 Zurich Classic of New Orleans.

Petrovic's career high Official World Golf Ranking was 65th in 2005. He earned over 12 million dollars on the PGA Tour, with over $1.7 million in both 2003 and 2005.

After not being fully exempt on the regular tour for five years, Petrovic joined PGA Tour Champions after turning 50 in 2016 and debuted at the Boeing Classic near Seattle in August.

He finished runner-up in the 2018 and 2021 Senior PGA Championship, 2018 U.S. Senior Open, and 2019 Senior Players Championship. He also finished third in the 2019 Senior British Open Championship.

== Awards and honors ==
- In 1995, Petrovic was inducted into the University of Hartford's Alumni Athletic Hall of Fame
- In 2017, Petrovic was inducted into the Connecticut Golf Hall of Fame

== Amateur wins ==
this list may be incomplete

- 1986 New England Amateur
- 1988 Connecticut Amateur

== Professional wins (5) ==
=== PGA Tour wins (1) ===
No.	Date	Tournament	Winning score	To par	Margin of victory	Runner-up
1	May 1, 2005	Zurich Classic of New Orleans	72-69-66-68=275	−13	Playoff	(United States) James Driscoll

PGA Tour playoff record (1–1)

No.	Year	Tournament	Opponent(s)	Result
1	2005	Zurich Classic of New Orleans	(United States) James Driscoll	Won with par on first extra hole
2	2015	Puerto Rico Open	(Germany) Alex Čejka, (United States) Jon Curran, (Argentina) Emiliano Grillo, (United States) Sam Saunders	Čejka won with birdie on first extra hole

=== Golden Bear Tour wins (4) ===
No.	Date	Tournament	Winning score	To par	Margin of victory	Runner(s)-up
1	Aug 3, 2000	St Andrews Classic 1	62-71-70=203	−13	Playoff	(United States) Patrick Sheehan
2	Sep 7, 2000	Aqua-Fina Classic	65-72=137	−7	Playoff	(United States) Nick Malinowski, (United States) Jamie Neher
3	Sep 15, 2000	HealthSouth Challenge	68-67-68-64=267	−21	3 strokes	(United States) Rodney Butcher
4	Sep 22, 2000	HealthSouth Classic	68-66-68=202	−14	Playoff	(United States) Jimmy Stobs

== Results in major championships ==
Tournament	2001	2002	2003	2004	2005	2006	2007	2008	2009	2010	2011
Masters Tournament				T41							
U.S. Open	T62		T15	T24			CUT				WD
The Open Championship		CUT			CUT			CUT		CUT	
PGA Championship			CUT	CUT	CUT				CUT	CUT	

Did not play

"T" = Tied
WD = Withdrew
CUT = missed the half-way cut

== Results in The Players Championship ==
Tournament	2003	2004	2005	2006	2007	2008	2009	2010	2011
The Players Championship	CUT	T53	T27	T38		T15	T37	CUT	CUT

Did not play

CUT = missed the halfway cut
"T" indicates a tie for a place

== Results in World Golf Championships ==
Tournament	2005
Match Play	
Championship	
Invitational	66

Did not play

== Results in senior major championships ==
Results not in chronological order.

Tournament	2017	2018	2019	2020	2021	2022	2023	2024	2025	2026
Senior PGA Championship	T33	2	T48	NT	2	T20	CUT	T21	34	T59
The Tradition		T27	T57	NT	T51	T9	35	T30	T42	T51
U.S. Senior Open		T2	58	NT	CUT	T41	WD		T9	T31
Senior Players Championship	T14	T43	T2	T33	T10	T11	T72	T56	6	T42
Senior British Open Championship	CUT	T28	T3	NT	CUT	CUT	T48	T19	T31	T26

Top 10
Did not play

"T" indicates a tie for a place
CUT = missed the halfway cut
WD = withdrew
NT = no tournament due to COVID-19 pandemic

== See also ==
- 2001 Buy.com Tour graduates
