= Patrick Sheehan (golfer) =

American professional golfer (born 1969)

Personal information
- Nationality: United States
- Born: August 9, 1969 (age 57) Providence, Rhode Island, U.S.
- Height: 5 ft 11 in (1.80 m)
- Weight: 190 lb (86 kg; 14 st)

Career
- Sport: Golf
- College: University of Hartford
- Turned professional: 1992
- Former tours: PGA Tour; Web.com Tour; Golden Bear Tour
- Professional wins: 5

Number of wins by tour
- Korn Ferry Tour: 2
- Other: 3

Best results in major championships
- Masters Tournament: DNP
- PGA Championship: T40: 2005
- U.S. Open: T29: 2008
- The Open Championship: DNP

Achievements and awards
- Golden Bear Tour money list winner: 1998

Patrick Sheehan (born August 9, 1969) is an American professional golfer who has played on the PGA Tour.

== Early life and amateur career ==
Sheehan was born in Providence, Rhode Island. While at the University of Hartford he was teammates with other future PGA Tour golfers Tim Petrovic and Jerry Kelly.

== Professional career ==
In 1992, Sheehan turned professional and though he has never won a PGA Tour event, he has finished second on one occasion and third on another.

Sheehan has two wins on the Nationwide Tour, most recently a playoff victory at the 2009 Athens Regional Foundation Classic over Michael Sim.

== Professional wins (5) ==
=== Nationwide Tour wins (2) ===
No.	Date	Tournament	Winning score	Margin of victory	Runner(s)-up
1	Jul 28, 2002	Price Cutter Charity Championship	−19 (63-68-66-72=269)	2 strokes	(United States) Eric Meeks, (United States) Brian Wilson
2	Apr 19, 2009	Athens Regional Foundation Classic	−14 (66-69-71-68=274)	Playoff	(Australia) Michael Sim

Nationwide Tour playoff record (1–0)

No.	Year	Tournament	Opponent	Result
1	2009	Athens Regional Foundation Classic	(Australia) Michael Sim	Won with birdie on first extra hole

=== Golden Bear Tour wins (3) ===
No.	Date	Tournament	Winning score	Margin of victory	Runner-up
1	Jun 4, 1998	Ibis and Hammock Creek	−8 (70-66-72=208)	1 stroke	(United States) Rick Price
2	Aug 28, 1998	Nicklaus Apparel Classic	−9 (71-70-69-69=279)	1 stroke	(United States) Robert Bilbo
2	Sep 25, 1998	Maxfli Classic	−12 (67-69-67=203)	1 stroke	(United States) R. J. Nakashian

== Results in major championships ==
Tournament	2005	2006	2007	2008
U.S. Open				T29
PGA Championship	T49	T40		

Did not play

"T" = tied
Note: Sheehan never played in the Masters Tournament or The Open Championship.

== See also ==
- 2002 Buy.com Tour graduates
- 2011 PGA Tour Qualifying School graduates
