= Golden Bear Tour =

Professional golf tour

- Sport: Golf
- Founded: 1996
- Founder: Jack Nicklaus
- First season: 1996
- Folded: 2004
- Countries: United States
- Region: Based in Florida
- Most titles: Money list titles: (United States) Hiroshi Matsuo (2)
- Related competitions: Gateway Tour

The Golden Bear Tour was an American third-tier professional golf tour based in Palm Beach County, Florida, United States. It was founded in 1996 by Jack Nicklaus, nicknamed the Golden Bear, through his company Golden Bear International and run by John Montgomery, who later founded the competing Montgomery Tour. The tour ran through to early 2005, when it merged with the Gateway Tour.

== Money list winners ==
Year	Winner	Prize money (US$)
2005	No money list awarded	
2004	(United States) Ryan LaVoie	86,950
2003	(United States) Michael Henderson	105,448
2002	(United States) Hiroshi Matsuo (2)	123,486
2001	(United States) Hiroshi Matsuo	162,842
2000	(United States) Tim Petrovic	166,569
1999	(United States) Danny Ellis	133,008
1998	(United States) Patrick Sheehan	164,353
1997	(United States) Chris Stutts	64,149
1996	(United States) Steve Lamontagne	72,628
