= 2009 Players Championship =

Tournament information
- Dates: May 7–10, 2009
- Location: Ponte Vedra Beach, Florida; 30.198°N 81.394°W
- Courses: TPC Sawgrass, Stadium Course
- Tour: PGA Tour

Statistics
- Par: 72
- Length: 7,215 yards (6,597 m)
- Field: 145 players, 83 after cut (71 after second cut)
- Cut: 144 (Even), 218 (+2)
- Prize fund: $9.5 million
- Winner's share: $1.71 million

Champion
- (Sweden) Henrik Stenson
- 276 (−12)

Location map
- Location in the United States Location in Florida

The 2009 Players Championship was a golf tournament in Florida on the PGA Tour, held May 7–10 at TPC Sawgrass in Ponte Vedra Beach, southeast of Jacksonville. It was the 36th Players Championship.

== Tournament summary ==
Henrik Stenson shot a bogey-free 66 in the final round to win at 276 (−12), four strokes ahead of Ian Poulter. Alex Čejka led by five strokes after the third round, but went out in 42 and finished in a tie for ninth. Stenson was the third European to win the title, after Sergio García the previous year and Sandy Lyle in 1987.

Due to 83 players making the halfway cut (top 70 and ties), a second cut was initiated after the third round.

Defending champion Sergio García finished ten strokes back, in a tie for 22nd place.

== Venue ==
This was the 28th Players Championship held at the TPC at Sawgrass Stadium Course and it remained at 7,215 yards (6,597 m).

=== Course layout ===
The 2009 Players Championship
Tee	Rating/Slope	1	2	3	4	5	6	7	8	9	Out	10	11	12	13	14	15	16	17	18	In	Total
Yards	n/a	423	532	177	384	471	393	442	237	583	3,642	424	558	358	181	481	449	523	137	462	3,573	7,215
Par		4	5	3	4	4	4	4	3	5	36	4	5	4	3	4	4	5	3	4	36	72

== Eligibility requirements ==
Winners of PGA Tour co-sponsored or approved tournaments, whose victories are considered official, since the previous year's Players Championship.

Ryuji Imada, Phil Mickelson, Kenny Perry, Justin Leonard, Tiger Woods, Stewart Cink, Anthony Kim, Pádraig Harrington, Richard S. Johnson, Chez Reavie, Vijay Singh, Parker McLachlin, Carl Pettersson, Camilo Villegas, Will MacKenzie, Dustin Johnson, Zach Johnson, Marc Turnesa, Cameron Beckman, Ryan Palmer, Davis Love III, Geoff Ogilvy, Pat Perez, Nick Watney, Mark Wilson, YE Yang, Michael Bradley, Retief Goosen, Paul Casey, Ángel Cabrera, Brian Gay, Jerry Kelly, Sean O'Hair

The top 125 finishers on the 2008 Official PGA Tour Money List.

Sergio García, Robert Allenby, Jim Furyk, Mike Weir, K. J. Choi, Ben Curtis, Kevin Sutherland, Trevor Immelman, Ernie Els, Stuart Appleby, Steve Stricker, Chad Campbell, Boo Weekley, D. J. Trahan, Stephen Ames, Ken Duke, Dudley Hart, Hunter Mahan, J. B. Holmes, Woody Austin, Steve Marino, Andrés Romero, Briny Baird, Jeff Quinney, Adam Scott, Mathew Goggin, Nicholas Thompson, Billy Mayfair, Tim Clark, Bart Bryant, Rod Pampling, Aaron Baddeley, Paul Goydos, Daniel Chopra, Freddie Jacobson, Rory Sabbatini, Bubba Watson, Steve Lowery, Charlie Wi, Tommy Armour III, Heath Slocum, Ben Crane, Ian Poulter, Peter Lonard, Luke Donald, Charles Howell III, Matt Kuchar, Johnson Wagner, Rocco Mediate, Nick O'Hern, George McNeill, Scott Verplank, Kevin Streelman, Dean Wilson, Tom Pernice Jr., John Merrick, Steve Elkington, John Senden, Steve Flesch, Ryan Moore, Troy Matteson, Greg Kraft, John Mallinger, Tim Wilkinson, Michael Letzig, Tim Herron, Brian Davis, Cliff Kresge, Vaughn Taylor, Justin Rose, Kevin Na, Jonathan Byrd, Joe Ogilvie, John Rollins, Bill Haas, Lucas Glover, Michael Allen, Tim Petrovic, Scott McCarron, Fred Couples, Charley Hoffman, J. J. Henry, Corey Pavin, Nathan Green, Bo Van Pelt, Eric Axley, Alex Čejka, Jeff Overton, Brett Quigley, Jason Bohn, Brad Adamonis, Martin Laird

Winners of the Players Championship, Masters, U.S. Open, British Open, and PGA Championship from 2004 to 2008; including 2009 Masters.

Fred Funk, Michael Campbell, Todd Hamilton

Winners of the Tour Championship the last three years (2006–08).

Winners of the World Golf Championship-Accenture Match Play Championship and World Golf Championships-CA Championship in the last three years (2007–2009).

Winner of the World Golf Championships-CA Championship from 2006 to 2009.

Winners of the World Golf Championships-Bridgestone Invitational in the last three years (2006–2008).

Any player(s), not otherwise eligible, among the top 50 leaders from the Official World Golf Rankings through the completion of the Zurich Classic. Any player(s), not otherwise eligible, among the top 10 leaders from the 2008 FedEx Cup Points List through the completion of the Zurich Classic.

Henrik Stenson, Robert Karlsson, Rory McIlroy, Martin Kaymer, Ross Fisher, Jeev Milkha Singh, Søren Kjeldsen, Graeme McDowell, Thongchai Jaidee

The winner of the 2008 Constellation Energy Senior Players Championship. (Such exemption will be an addition to the field.)

D. A. Weibring

The leading money winner from the 2008 Official Nationwide Tour Money List.

Matt Bettencourt

If necessary to complete a field of 144 players, PGA Tour members from the 2009 FedExCup Points List below 10th position one week prior, in order of their position on such list.

David Toms, Jason Dufner, Jeff Klauk, Scott Piercy, Bob Estes, Webb Simpson

== Round summaries ==
=== First round ===
Thursday, May 7, 2009

Place	Player	Score	To par
1	(United States) Ben Crane	65	−7
T2	(Germany) Alex Čejka	66	−6
T2	(Sweden) Richard S. Johnson	66	−6
T2	(United States) John Mallinger	66	−6
T5	(United States) Brad Adamonis	67	−5
T5	(United States) Jonathan Byrd	67	−5
T5	(United States) Jason Dufner	67	−5
T5	(South Africa) Retief Goosen	67	−5
T5	(England) Ian Poulter	67	−5
T5	(United States) David Toms	67	−5
T5	(United States) Scott Verplank	67	−5
T5	(Colombia) Camilo Villegas	67	−5
T5	(United States) Bubba Watson	67	−5

=== Second round ===
Friday, May 8, 2009

Place	Player	Score	To par
1	(Germany) Alex Čejka	66-67=133	−11
2	(England) Ian Poulter	67-68=135	−9
T3	(Argentina) Ángel Cabrera	72-65=137	−7
T3	(United States) Jason Dufner	67-70=137	−7
T3	(United States) John Mallinger	66-71=137	−7
T3	(United States) Kevin Na	71-66=137	−7
T3	(Sweden) Henrik Stenson	68-69=137	−7
T3	(United States) David Toms	67-70=137	−7
T9	(United States) Ben Crane	65-73=138	−6
T9	(Sweden) Richard S. Johnson	66-72=138	−6
T9	(United States) Jeff Overton	71-67=138	−6
T9	(United States) Tim Petrovic	68-70=138	−6

=== Third round ===
Saturday, May 9, 2009

Place	Player	Score	To par
1	(Germany) Alex Čejka	66-67-72=205	−11
T2	(United States) Jonathan Byrd	67-72-71=210	−6
T2	(United States) Ben Crane	65-73-72=210	−6
T2	(South Africa) Retief Goosen	67-72-71=210	−6
T2	(England) Ian Poulter	67-68-75=210	−6
T2	(Sweden) Henrik Stenson	68-69-73=210	−6
T2	(United States) Tiger Woods	71-69-70=210	−6
T8	(England) Brian Davis	71-69-71=211	−5
T8	(United States) John Mallinger	66-71-74=211	−5
T8	(United States) Kevin Na	71-66-74=211	−5

=== Final leaderboard ===
Sunday, May 10, 2009

Alex Čejka held a five-shot lead entering the final round, but quickly faltered with a six-over front nine and slumped to a closing 79. This opened the door for many, and Henrik Stenson pulled clear with a bogey-free 66 for a four-stroke victory.

Champion
(c) = past champion

Place	Player	Score	To par	Money ($)
1	(Sweden) Henrik Stenson	68-69-73-66=276	−12	1,710,000
2	(England) Ian Poulter	67-68-75-70=280	−8	1,026,000
T3	(United States) John Mallinger	66-71-74-70=281	−7	551,000
T3	(United States) Kevin Na	71-66-74-70=281	−7	551,000
T5	(United States) Ben Crane	65-73-72-72=282	−6	346,750
T5	(England) Brian Davis	71-69-71-71=282	−6	346,750
T5	(United States) Jim Furyk	68-74-71-69=282	−6	346,750
8	(United States) Tiger Woods (c)	71-69-70-73=283	−5	294,500
T9	(Australia) Aaron Baddeley	71-71-76-66=284	−4	237,500
T9	(Germany) Alex Čejka	66-67-72-79=284	−4	237,500
T9	(South Africa) Tim Clark	72-69-74-69=284	−4	237,500
T9	(Fiji) Vijay Singh	71-72-74-67=284	−4	237,500
T9	(United States) David Toms	67-70-77-70=284	−4	237,500

Leaderboard below the top 10
Place	Player	Score	To par	Money ($)
T14	(Australia) Robert Allenby	73-66-75-71=285	−3	147,250
T14	(Argentina) Ángel Cabrera	72-65-77-71=285	−3	147,250
T14	(England) Paul Casey	70-69-76-70=285	−3	147,250
T14	(Sweden) Daniel Chopra	75-65-72-73=285	−3	147,250
T14	(United States) Jeff Klauk	71-72-71-71=285	−3	147,250
T14	(United States) Matt Kuchar	72-72-73-68=285	−3	147,250
T14	(Colombia) Camilo Villegas	67-72-75-71=285	−3	147,250
T14	(Canada) Mike Weir	72-72-73-68=285	−3	147,250
T22	(United States) Tommy Armour III	74-70-70-72=286	−2	79,325
T22	(United States) Woody Austin	72-72-68-74=286	−2	79,325
T22	(United States) Ben Curtis	71-72-69-74=286	−2	79,325
T22	(Spain) Sergio García (c)	71-73-73-69=286	−2	79,325
T22	(South Africa) Retief Goosen	67-72-71-76=286	−2	79,325
T22	(Australia) Geoff Ogilvy	70-72-73-71=286	−2	79,325
T22	(United States) Kenny Perry	73-71-68-74=286	−2	79,325
T22	(United States) Scott Piercy	71-72-74-69=286	−2	79,325
T22	(England) Justin Rose	70-71-72-73=286	−2	79,325
T22	(United States) Steve Stricker	71-71-71-73=286	−2	79,325
T32	(United States) Jason Dufner	67-70-77-73=287	−1	53,770
T32	(United States) Zach Johnson	72-71-70-74=287	−1	53,770
T32	(United States) Justin Leonard (c)	70-69-75-73=287	−1	53,770
T32	(United States) Billy Mayfair	70-74-69-74=287	−1	53,770
T32	(United States) Kevin Sutherland	73-67-72-75=287	−1	53,770
T37	(United States) Jonathan Byrd	67-72-71-78=288	E	39,900
T37	(England) Luke Donald	74-70-71-73=288	E	39,900
T37	(United States) Charley Hoffman	70-69-76-73=288	E	39,900
T37	(United States) Jeff Overton	71-67-75-75=288	E	39,900
T37	(United States) Tim Petrovic	68-70-75-75=288	E	39,900
T37	(United States) John Rollins	68-76-70-74=288	E	39,900
T37	(Australia) John Senden	72-69-72-75=288	E	39,900
T37	(United States) Bubba Watson	67-75-72-74=288	E	39,900
T45	(South Africa) Ernie Els	73-69-73-74=289	+1	28,595
T45	(Japan) Ryuji Imada	72-70-75-72=289	+1	28,595
T45	(Sweden) Richard S. Johnson	66-72-74-77=289	+1	28,595
T45	(United States) Michael Letzig	71-68-74-76=289	+1	28,595
T49	(Canada) Stephen Ames (c)	70-71-75-74=290	+2	23,211
T49	(United States) Jason Bohn	72-71-74-73=290	+2	23,211
T49	(Republic of Ireland) Pádraig Harrington	72-72-74-72=290	+2	23,211
T49	(Sweden) Freddie Jacobson	70-73-72-75=290	+2	23,211
T49	(Australia) Nick O'Hern	68-73-75-74=290	+2	23,211
T49	(United States) Scott Verplank	67-74-73-76=290	+2	23,211
T55	(United States) Brad Adamonis	67-76-74-74=291	+3	21,470
T55	(Germany) Martin Kaymer	71-73-69-78=291	+3	21,470
T55	(United States) Phil Mickelson (c)	73-71-71-76=291	+3	21,470
T55	(United States) Heath Slocum	75-69-71-76=291	+3	21,470
T55	(United States) Mark Wilson	69-72-75-75=291	+3	21,470
T60	(United States) Rocco Mediate	73-71-74-74=292	+4	20,710
T60	(United States) Chez Reavie	70-72-75-75=292	+4	20,710
T60	(United States) Johnson Wagner	69-73-72-78=292	+4	20,710
63	(United States) Michael Allen	71-70-74-78=293	+5	20,330
T64	(United States) Steve Flesch	75-69-74-76=294	+6	20,045
T64	(India) Jeev Milkha Singh	68-74-76-76=294	+6	20,045
T66	(United States) Cameron Beckman	72-72-73-78=295	+7	19,665
T66	(United States) John Merrick	70-72-74-79=295	+7	19,665
T68	(United States) Pat Perez	72-72-74-78=296	+8	19,285
T68	(United States) Jeff Quinney	73-70-75-78=296	+8	19,285
70	(United States) Ryan Moore	71-68-75-84=298	+10	19,000
T71	(South Korea) K. J. Choi	73-69-77=219	+3	18,430
T71	(Australia) Nathan Green	74-69-76=219	+3	18,430
T71	(Sweden) Robert Karlsson	74-70-75=219	+3	18,430
T71	(Scotland) Martin Laird	71-72-76=219	+3	18,430
T71	(United States) Hunter Mahan	73-71-75=219	+3	18,430
T76	(United States) Stewart Cink	70-73-77=220	+4	17,765
T76	(United States) Bob Estes	75-68-77=220	+4	17,765
78	(Northern Ireland) Graeme McDowell	71-73-77=221	+5	17,480
T79	(United States) Fred Funk (c)	73-71-78=222	+6	17,005
T79	(United States) Dustin Johnson	72-72-78=222	+6	17,005
T79	(United States) Steve Marino	72-72-78=222	+6	17,005
T79	(Australia) Rod Pampling	70-73-79=222	+6	17,005
CUT	(United States) Bart Bryant	74-71=145	+1	
CUT	(United States) Ken Duke	70-75=145	+1	
CUT	(United States) Jerry Kelly	73-72=145	+1	
CUT	(Denmark) Søren Kjeldsen	70-75=145	+1	
CUT	(United States) Will MacKenzie	73-72=145	+1	
CUT	(United States) Troy Matteson	73-72=145	+1	
CUT	(United States) George McNeill	70-75=145	+1	
CUT	(United States) Joe Ogilvie	72-73=145	+1	
CUT	(Argentina) Andrés Romero	74-71=145	+1	
CUT	(Australia) Adam Scott (c)	71-74=145	+1	
CUT	(United States) Chad Campbell	75-71=146	+2	
CUT	(Australia) Steve Elkington (c)	73-73=146	+2	
CUT	(United States) Todd Hamilton	74-72=146	+2	
CUT	(United States) Charles Howell III	73-73=146	+2	
CUT	(United States) Scott McCarron	74-72=146	+2	
CUT	(United States) Nicholas Thompson	73-73=146	+2	
CUT	(United States) Nick Watney	68-78=146	+2	
CUT	(Australia) Stuart Appleby	71-76=147	+3	
CUT	(United States) Eric Axley	72-75=147	+3	
CUT	(United States) Bill Haas	74-73=147	+3	
CUT	(United States) Greg Kraft	74-73=147	+3	
CUT	(United States) Cliff Kresge	72-75=147	+3	
CUT	(United States) Davis Love III (c)	73-74=147	+3	
CUT	(United States) D. J. Trahan	74-73=147	+3	
CUT	(United States) Bo Van Pelt	71-76=147	+3	
CUT	(United States) Briny Baird	72-76=148	+4	
CUT	(England) Ross Fisher	74-74=148	+4	
CUT	(United States) Lucas Glover	73-75=148	+4	
CUT	(United States) Paul Goydos	78-70=148	+4	
CUT	(United States) J. B. Holmes	72-76=148	+4	
CUT	(Thailand) Thongchai Jaidee	74-74=148	+4	
CUT	(United States) Sean O'Hair	73-75=148	+4	
CUT	(United States) Brett Quigley	72-76=148	+4	
CUT	(United States) Kevin Streelman	74-74=148	+4	
CUT	(United States) Vaughn Taylor	72-76=148	+4	
CUT	(South Korea) Charlie Wi	74-74=148	+4	
CUT	(United States) J. J. Henry	73-76=149	+5	
CUT	(United States) Parker McLachlin	75-74=149	+5	
CUT	(United States) Dean Wilson	77-72=149	+5	
CUT	(United States) Tim Herron	75-75=150	+6	
CUT	(Australia) Peter Lonard	77-73=150	+6	
CUT	(United States) Ryan Palmer	75-75=150	+6	
CUT	(South Korea) Yang Yong-eun	73-77=150	+6	
CUT	(United States) Fred Couples (c)	80-71=151	+7	
CUT	(Northern Ireland) Rory McIlroy	74-77=151	+7	
CUT	(United States) Corey Pavin	74-77=151	+7	
CUT	(United States) Marc Turnesa	76-75=151	+7	
CUT	(Australia) Mathew Goggin	76-77=153	+9	
CUT	(United States) Tom Pernice Jr.	74-79=153	+9	
CUT	(South Africa) Rory Sabbatini	81-72=153	+9	
CUT	(United States) Webb Simpson	76-77=153	+9	
CUT	(New Zealand) Tim Wilkinson	77-77=154	+10	
CUT	(United States) Matt Bettencourt	76-79=155	+11	
CUT	(South Africa) Trevor Immelman	73-82=155	+11	
CUT	(United States) Anthony Kim	73-82=155	+11	
CUT	(United States) Michael Bradley	80-78=158	+14	
CUT	(United States) Steve Lowery	81-78=159	+15	
WD	(United States) Boo Weekley	73-67-73=213	−3	
WD	(United States) Dudley Hart	73	+1	
WD	(Sweden) Carl Pettersson	74	+2	
WD	(United States) Brian Gay	80	+8	
WD	(New Zealand) Michael Campbell			
WD	(United States) D. A. Weibring			

==== Scorecard ====
Final round

Hole	1	2	3	4	5	6	7	8	9	10	11	12	13	14	15	16	17	18
Par	4	5	3	4	4	4	4	3	5	4	5	4	3	4	4	5	3	4
(Sweden) Stenson	−6	−6	−6	−6	−6	−6	−7	−7	−8	−8	−9	−9	−10	−10	−11	−12	−12	−12
(England) Poulter	−6	−7	−7	−6	−6	−6	−6	−6	−7	−7	−7	−7	−7	−7	−8	−8	−8	−8
(United States) Mallinger	−5	−5	−5	−5	−5	−6	−5	−5	−5	−5	−6	−6	−6	−7	−7	−8	−8	−7
(United States) Na	−5	−6	−6	−6	−5	−5	−5	−5	−5	−5	−6	−6	−5	−5	−5	−7	−7	−7
(United States) Crane	−7	−8	−8	−8	−8	−8	−8	−7	−7	−7	−7	−7	−6	−5	−5	−6	−5	−6
(England) Davis	−5	−6	−5	−5	−5	−5	−4	−4	−6	−6	−7	−7	−7	−6	−6	−6	−6	−6
(United States) Furyk	−3	−4	−4	−4	−4	−5	−5	−4	−3	−4	−4	−5	−5	−5	−5	−6	−6	−6
(United States) Woods	−6	−5	−5	−4	−4	−5	−4	−4	−4	−3	−3	−3	−3	−4	−4	−5	−5	−5
(Germany) Čejka	−10	−10	−10	−8	−7	−6	−6	−5	−5	−6	−6	−5	−4	−4	−4	−4	−4	−4

Cumulative tournament scores, relative to par

Eagle	Birdie	Bogey	Double bogey
