= 2003 Players Championship =

Tournament information
- Dates: March 27–30, 2003
- Location: Ponte Vedra Beach, Florida; 30.198°N 81.394°W
- Courses: TPC Sawgrass, Stadium Course
- Tour: PGA Tour

Statistics
- Par: 72
- Length: 7,093 yards (6,486 m)
- Field: 144 players, 72 after cut
- Cut: 144 (Even)
- Prize fund: $6.5 million
- Winner's share: $1.17 million

Champion
- (United States) Davis Love III
- 271 (−17)

Location map
- Location in the United States Location in Florida

The 2003 Players Championship was a golf tournament in Florida on the PGA Tour, held March 27–30 at TPC Sawgrass in Ponte Vedra Beach, southeast of Jacksonville. It was the 30th Players Championship.

Davis Love III shot a final round 64 in cool and blustery conditions to handily win his second Players title, six strokes ahead of runners-up Jay Haas and Pádraig Harrington, the 54-hole co-leaders. Love won eleven years earlier in 1992, and started the final round two strokes back.

Defending champion Craig Perks finished twelve strokes back, in a tie for seventeenth place.

== Venue ==
This was the 22nd Players Championship held at the TPC at Sawgrass Stadium Course and it remained at 7,093 yards (6,486 m).

== Field ==
Fulton Allem, Robert Allenby, Stephen Ames, Billy Andrade, Stuart Appleby, Paul Azinger, Briny Baird, Craig Barlow, Pat Bates, Cameron Beckman, Rich Beem, Notah Begay III, David Berganio Jr., Mark Brooks, Olin Browne, Bob Burns, Jonathan Byrd, Tom Byrum, Ángel Cabrera, Mark Calcavecchia, Chad Campbell, Michael Campbell, Jim Carter, Greg Chalmers, K. J. Choi, Stewart Cink, Tim Clark, Darren Clarke, José Cóceres, John Cook, Fred Couples, Ben Crane, John Daly, Robert Damron, Glen Day, Chris DiMarco, Luke Donald, Joe Durant, David Duval, Joel Edwards, Steve Elkington, Bob Estes, Nick Faldo, Niclas Fasth, Brad Faxon, Steve Flesch, Dan Forsman, Carlos Franco, Harrison Frazar, Fred Funk, Jim Furyk, Robert Gamez, Sergio García, Brian Gay, Brent Geiberger, Matt Gogel, Retief Goosen, David Gossett, Jay Haas, Pádraig Harrington, Dudley Hart, J. P. Hayes, J. J. Henry, Tim Herron, Glen Hnatiuk, Charles Howell III, John Huston, Trevor Immelman, Lee Janzen, Brandt Jobe, Per-Ulrik Johansson, Steve Jones, Jonathan Kaye, Jerry Kelly, Skip Kendall, Matt Kuchar, Neal Lancaster, Bernhard Langer, Paul Lawrie, Stephen Leaney, Tom Lehman, Justin Leonard, Thomas Levet, J. L. Lewis, Frank Lickliter, Peter Lonard, Davis Love III, Steve Lowery, Andrew Magee, Jeff Maggert, Shigeki Maruyama, Len Mattiace, Billy Mayfair, Scott McCarron, Spike McRoy, Rocco Mediate, Shaun Micheel, Colin Montgomerie, Greg Norman, Mark O'Meara, Geoff Ogilvy, José María Olazábal, Rod Pampling, Jesper Parnevik, Craig Parry, Carl Paulson, Corey Pavin, David Peoples, Pat Perez, Craig Perks, Tom Pernice Jr., Kenny Perry, Tim Petrovic, Nick Price, Chris Riley, Loren Roberts, John Rollins, Eduardo Romero, Justin Rose, Rory Sabbatini, Gene Sauers, Adam Scott, John Senden, Joey Sindelar, Vijay Singh, Heath Slocum, Jeff Sluman, Chris Smith, Paul Stankowski, Steve Stricker, Kevin Sutherland, Hal Sutton, Hidemichi Tanaka, Phil Tataurangi, Esteban Toledo, David Toms, Kirk Triplett, Bob Tway, Scott Verplank, Duffy Waldorf, Mike Weir, Jay Williamson, Garrett Willis, Tiger Woods

== Round summaries ==
=== First round ===
Thursday, March 27, 2003
Friday, March 28, 2003

Place	Player	Score	To par
T1	(United States) Fred Couples	67	−5
T1	(Republic of Ireland) Pádraig Harrington	67	−5
T3	(Sweden) Niclas Fasth	68	−4
T3	(United States) Jay Haas	68	−4
T3	(United States) Steve Jones	68	−4
T3	(United States) Skip Kendall	68	−4
T3	(United States) Rocco Mediate	68	−4
T3	(New Zealand) Craig Perks	68	−4
T3	(United States) Bob Tway	68	−4
T10	(United States) Jim Carter	69	−3
T10	(United States) Stewart Cink	69	−3
T10	(South Africa) Tim Clark	69	−3
T10	(United States) Tom Lehman	69	−3
T10	(Australia) Adam Scott	69	−3
T10	(United States) Kevin Sutherland	69	−3

=== Second round ===
Friday, March 28, 2003
Saturday, March 29, 2003

Place	Player	Score	To par
1	(Republic of Ireland) Pádraig Harrington	67-68=135	−9
T2	(United States) Skip Kendall	68-69=137	−7
T2	(United States) Davis Love III	70-67=137	−7
T2	(New Zealand) Craig Perks	68-69=137	−7
T5	(United States) Chad Campbell	72-66=138	−6
T5	(United States) Fred Couples	67-71=138	−6
T5	(United States) Jay Haas	68-70=138	−6
T5	(United States) Rocco Mediate	68-70=138	−6
T5	(Australia) Adam Scott	69-69=138	−6
T10	(United States) Glen Day	72-67=139	−5
T10	(United States) Bob Estes	71-68=139	−5
T10	(United States) Steve Flesch	71-68=139	−5
T10	(Australia) Geoff Ogilvy	71-68=139	−5
T10	(United States) Corey Pavin	70-69=139	−5

=== Third round ===
Saturday, March 29, 2003

Place	Player	Score	To par
T1	(United States) Jay Haas	68-70-67=205	−11
T1	(Republic of Ireland) Pádraig Harrington	67-68-70=205	−11
T3	(United States) Fred Couples	67-71-69=207	−9
T3	(United States) Davis Love III	70-67-70=207	−9
T3	(New Zealand) Craig Perks	68-69-70=207	−9
T6	(Northern Ireland) Darren Clarke	71-70-67=208	−8
T6	(United States) Corey Pavin	70-69-69=208	−8
T8	(United States) Chad Campbell	72-66-71=209	−7
T8	(United States) Steve Flesch	71-68-70=209	−7
T8	(United States) Jim Furyk	73-68-68=209	−7
T8	(United States) Jeff Maggert	71-70-68=209	−7

=== Final round ===
Sunday, March 30, 2003

Champion
(c) = past champion

Place	Player	Score	To par	Money ($)
1	(United States) Davis Love III (c)	70-67-70-64=271	−17	1,170,000
T2	(United States) Jay Haas	68-70-67-72=277	−11	572,000
T2	(Republic of Ireland) Pádraig Harrington	67-68-70-72=277	−11	572,000
T4	(Australia) Robert Allenby	70-71-72-65=278	−10	286,000
T4	(United States) Jim Furyk	73-68-68-69=278	−10	286,000
T6	(United States) Chad Campbell	72-66-71-70=279	−9	225,875
T6	(Northern Ireland) Darren Clarke	71-70-67-71=279	−9	225,875
T8	(United States) Kirk Triplett	72-70-71-67=280	−8	195,000
T8	(United States) Scott Verplank	71-72-68-69=280	−8	195,000
10	(United States) Fred Couples (c)	67-71-69-74=281	−7	175,500

Leaderboard below the top 10
Place	Player	Score	To par	Money ($)
T11	(United States) Briny Baird	76-68-68-70=282	−6	133,250
T11	(United States) Mark Calcavecchia	73-68-72-69=282	−6	133,250
T11	(United States) Brad Faxon	73-69-71-69=282	−6	133,250
T11	(United States) Jeff Maggert	71-70-68-73=282	−6	133,250
T11	(United States) Duffy Waldorf	70-72-68-72=282	−6	133,250
T11	(United States) Tiger Woods (c)	72-70-68-72=282	−6	133,250
T17	(Trinidad and Tobago) Stephen Ames	73-69-71-70=283	−5	94,250
T17	(New Zealand) Craig Perks (c)	68-69-70-76=283	−5	94,250
T17	(Australia) Adam Scott	69-69-74-71=283	−5	94,250
T17	(United States) Bob Tway	68-73-69-73=283	−5	94,250
T21	(Australia) Stuart Appleby	71-72-71-70=284	−4	65,000
T21	(South Africa) Tim Clark	69-72-69-74=284	−4	65,000
T21	(United States) Chris DiMarco	77-67-70-70=284	−4	65,000
T21	(Sweden) Niclas Fasth	68-73-71-72=284	−4	65,000
T21	(United States) Justin Leonard (c)	73-70-68-73=284	−4	65,000
T21	(Australia) Geoff Ogilvy	71-68-72-73=284	−4	65,000
T27	(United States) Glen Day	72-67-73-73=285	−3	47,125
T27	(United States) Neal Lancaster	70-72-69-74=285	−3	47,125
T27	(Canada) Mike Weir	72-71-69-73=285	−3	47,125
T27	(United States) Jay Williamson	74-69-68-74=285	−3	47,125
31	(United States) Bob Estes	71-68-72-75=286	−2	42,250
T32	(United States) Charles Howell III	72-71-72-72=287	−1	35,192
T32	(United States) Brandt Jobe	72-70-70-75=287	−1	35,192
T32	(United States) Jonathan Kaye	73-70-70-74=287	−1	35,192
T32	(United States) Skip Kendall	68-69-73-77=287	−1	35,192
T32	(United States) Corey Pavin	70-69-69-79=287	−1	35,192
T32	(United States) Kenny Perry	70-73-69-75=287	−1	35,192
T32	(United States) Jeff Sluman	72-72-70-73=287	−1	35,192
T39	(United States) Stewart Cink	69-71-73-75=288	E	26,000
T39	(England) Nick Faldo	74-68-72-74=288	E	26,000
T39	(United States) Steve Flesch	71-68-70-79=288	E	26,000
T39	(Canada) Glen Hnatiuk	71-72-71-74=288	E	26,000
T39	(United States) Tom Lehman	69-72-75-72=288	E	26,000
T39	(England) Justin Rose	72-71-69-76=288	E	26,000
T45	(United States) Fred Funk	70-70-75-74=289	+1	20,150
T45	(Japan) Shigeki Maruyama	76-65-74-74=289	+1	20,150
T45	(United States) Rocco Mediate	68-70-73-78=289	+1	20,150
T48	(United States) Billy Andrade	71-72-73-74=290	+2	16,336
T48	(Paraguay) Carlos Franco	71-71-72-76=290	+2	16,336
T48	(Sweden) Per-Ulrik Johansson	73-70-75-72=290	+2	16,336
T48	(Germany) Bernhard Langer	72-70-71-77=290	+2	16,336
T48	(Sweden) Jesper Parnevik	76-68-69-77=290	+2	16,336
T48	(United States) Kevin Sutherland	69-73-72-76=290	+2	16,336
T54	(United States) Tim Herron	71-73-72-75=291	+3	15,015
T54	(United States) Shaun Micheel	71-73-71-76=291	+3	15,015
T56	(United States) Notah Begay III	77-67-76-72=292	+4	14,495
T56	(United States) David Berganio Jr.	75-69-72-76=292	+4	14,495
T56	(United States) John Daly	70-70-72-80=292	+4	14,495
T56	(Scotland) Paul Lawrie	71-73-74-74=292	+4	14,495
T56	(Australia) Peter Lonard	73-68-71-80=292	+4	14,495
T56	(Mexico) Esteban Toledo	74-69-72-77=292	+4	14,495
T62	(United States) Mark Brooks	73-70-75-75=293	+5	13,845
T62	(United States) Joe Durant	75-67-75-76=293	+5	13,845
T62	(United States) Dudley Hart	75-69-75-74=293	+5	13,845
T62	(United States) Steve Jones	68-75-76-74=293	+5	13,845
T66	(United States) Bob Burns	74-70-72-78=294	+6	13,455
T66	(United States) Matt Gogel	70-71-77-76=294	+6	13,455
68	(United States) Lee Janzen (c)	73-69-70-83=295	+7	13,260
T69	(United States) Jim Carter	69-73-77-80=299	+11	13,065
T69	(United States) Robert Gamez	71-73-74-81=299	+11	13,065
71	(United States) Loren Roberts	75-69-78-78=300	+12	12,870
CUT	(United States) Paul Azinger	72-73=145	+1	
CUT	(United States) Pat Bates	72-73=145	+1	
CUT	(United States) Olin Browne	73-72=145	+1	
CUT	(United States) Tom Byrum	73-72=145	+1	
CUT	(Spain) Sergio García	71-74=145	+1	
CUT	(South Africa) Retief Goosen	73-72=145	+1	
CUT	(United States) Matt Kuchar	74-71=145	+1	
CUT	(France) Thomas Levet	74-71=145	+1	
CUT	(United States) Andrew Magee	70-75=145	+1	
CUT	(Scotland) Colin Montgomerie	73-72=145	+1	
CUT	(United States) Tim Petrovic	75-70=145	+1	
CUT	(United States) Chris Riley	73-72=145	+1	
CUT	(United States) Joey Sindelar	71-74=145	+1	
CUT	(United States) Paul Stankowski	74-71=145	+1	
CUT	(United States) Hal Sutton (c)	73-72=145	+1	
CUT	(New Zealand) Phil Tataurangi	74-71=145	+1	
CUT	(United States) David Toms	70-75=145	+1	
CUT	(United States) Jonathan Byrd	72-74=146	+2	
CUT	(United States) Brent Geiberger	73-73=146	+2	
CUT	(United States) Jerry Kelly	72-74=146	+2	
CUT	(Zimbabwe) Nick Price (c)	73-73=146	+2	
CUT	(United States) Gene Sauers	73-73=146	+2	
CUT	(United States) Craig Barlow	76-71=147	+3	
CUT	(United States) Cameron Beckman	76-71=147	+3	
CUT	(United States) Rich Beem	75-72=147	+3	
CUT	(United States) Ben Crane	79-68=147	+3	
CUT	(Australia) Steve Elkington (c)	75-72=147	+3	
CUT	(United States) Brian Gay	73-74=147	+3	
CUT	(United States) J. J. Henry	76-71=147	+3	
CUT	(Australia) Craig Parry	73-74=147	+3	
CUT	(United States) John Rollins	75-72=147	+3	
CUT	(South Africa) Rory Sabbatini	73-74=147	+3	
CUT	(Fiji) Vijay Singh	75-72=147	+3	
CUT	(United States) David Duval (c)	76-72=148	+4	
CUT	(United States) David Gossett	74-74=148	+4	
CUT	(United States) J. P. Hayes	78-70=148	+4	
CUT	(United States) Frank Lickliter	74-74=148	+4	
CUT	(Spain) José María Olazábal	71-77=148	+4	
CUT	(Australia) John Senden	75-73=148	+4	
CUT	(United States) Steve Stricker	78-70=148	+4	
CUT	(Argentina) Ángel Cabrera	74-75=149	+5	
CUT	(United States) Joel Edwards	74-75=149	+5	
CUT	(South Africa) Trevor Immelman	79-70=149	+5	
CUT	(United States) Tom Pernice Jr.	78-71=149	+5	
CUT	(Argentina) Eduardo Romero	73-76=149	+5	
CUT	(England) Luke Donald	74-76=150	+6	
CUT	(United States) Len Mattiace	75-75=150	+6	
CUT	(United States) Billy Mayfair	81-69=150	+6	
CUT	(South Korea) K. J. Choi	78-73=151	+7	
CUT	(United States) Robert Damron	76-75=151	+7	
CUT	(United States) Dan Forsman	75-76=151	+7	
CUT	(United States) Harrison Frazar	77-74=151	+7	
CUT	(Australia) Rod Pampling	77-74=151	+7	
CUT	(United States) Heath Slocum	75-76=151	+7	
CUT	(United States) Garrett Willis	75-76=151	+7	
CUT	(United States) J. L. Lewis	79-73=152	+8	
CUT	(United States) Spike McRoy	78-74=152	+8	
CUT	(United States) Mark O'Meara	74-78=152	+8	
CUT	(United States) Chris Smith	73-79=152	+8	
CUT	(Australia) Greg Chalmers	75-78=153	+9	
CUT	(United States) Scott McCarron	79-74=153	+9	
CUT	(United States) Pat Perez	75-78=153	+9	
CUT	(Australia) Stephen Leaney	78-77=155	+11	
CUT	(Japan) Hidemichi Tanaka	77-78=155	+11	
CUT	(South Africa) Fulton Allem	76-81=157	+13	
WD	(United States) John Cook	72-71-73=216	E	
WD	(United States) David Peoples	73	+1	
WD	(United States) Steve Lowery	75	+3	
WD	(Argentina) José Cóceres	76	+4	
WD	(Australia) Greg Norman (c)	78	+6	
WD	(United States) John Huston	79	+7	
WD	(United States) Carl Paulson			
DQ	(New Zealand) Michael Campbell	89	+17	
