= Panama Championship =

Tournament information
- Location: Panama City, Panama
- Established: 2004
- Course: Panama Golf Club
- Par: 70
- Length: 7,171 yards (6,557 m)
- Tour: Korn Ferry Tour
- Format: Stroke play
- Prize fund: US$1,000,000
- Month played: January/February

Tournament record score
- Aggregate: 265 Fran Quinn (2010)
- To par: −15 as above

Current champion
- (United States) Ian Holt

Final champion
- Location in Panama

The Panama Championship is a golf tournament on the Korn Ferry Tour. It is played annually at Panama Golf Club in Panama City, Panama. It is one of several tournaments on the Korn Ferry Tour held outside the United States.

The 2023 purse was $1,000,000.

== Winners ==
Year	Winner	Score	To par	Margin of victory	Runner(s)-up
Panama Championship
2026	(United States) Ian Holt	272	−8	2 strokes	(Canada) Adam Hadwin
2025	(United States) Josh Teater	271	−9	2 strokes	(United States) Nick Gabrelcik (United States) Johnny Keefer (United States) Dylan Wu
2024	(United States) Isaiah Salinda	268	−12	8 strokes	(Canada) Wil Bateman (United States) Keenan Huskey (United States) Trent Phillips
2023	(United States) Pierceson Coody	277	−3	Playoff	(United States) Mac Meissner (United States) Sam Saunders
2022	(United States) Carson Young	272	−8	1 stroke	(United States) Brandon Matthews (United States) Jimmy Stanger (China) Yuan Yechun
2021: No tournament
2020	(United States) Davis Riley	270	−10	1 stroke	(Mexico) Roberto Díaz
2019	(Canada) Michael Gligic	272	−8	1 stroke	(China) Zhang Xinjun
2018	(United States) Scott Langley	273	−7	2 strokes	(Puerto Rico) Rafael Campos (United States) Edward Loar
Panama Claro Championship
2017	(United States) Andrew Putnam	267	−13	Playoff	(United States) Chris Baker
2016	(United States) Ryan Armour	268	−12	3 strokes	(United States) Kyle Thompson
2015	(Australia) Mathew Goggin (2)	269	−11	4 strokes	(United States) Harold Varner III
2014	(Mexico) Carlos Ortiz	268	−12	4 strokes	(United States) Jason Gore
2013	(United States) Kevin Foley	272	−8	1 stroke	(Australia) Mathew Goggin
2012	(United States) Edward Loar	276	−4	1 stroke	(United States) Ryan Armour (United States) Luke List (Australia) Cameron Percy (United States) Brian Smock
2011	(Australia) Mathew Goggin	269	−11	2 strokes	(Australia) Alistair Presnell (United States) Darron Stiles
2010	(United States) Fran Quinn	265	−15	2 strokes	(United States) Brian Smock
Panama Digicel Championship
2009	(United States) Vance Veazey (2)	273	−7	Playoff	(United States) Garrett Willis
Panama Movistar Championship
2008	(United States) Scott Dunlap	277	−3	1 stroke	(India) Arjun Atwal (United States) Jeff Klauk
Movistar Panama Championship
2007	(Argentina) Miguel Ángel Carballo	274	−6	2 strokes	(United States) Hunter Haas (United States) Jim McGovern (United States) Patrick Sheehan
2006	(United States) Tripp Isenhour	269	−11	3 strokes	(United States) Kevin Gessino-Kraft (United States) Parker McLachlin (South Africa) Brenden Pappas
BellSouth Panama Championship
2005	(United States) Vance Veazey	272	−8	1 stroke	(United States) Shane Bertsch (United States) Jim McGovern (Canada) Jon Mills (Colombia) Camilo Villegas
2004	(United States) Jimmy Walker	273	−7	5 strokes	(United States) Tom Scherrer

== See also ==
- Panama Open
