= Andrew Putnam =

American professional golfer (born 1989)

Personal information
- Full name: Andrew David Putnam
- Nationality: United States
- Born: January 25, 1989 (age 37) Tacoma, Washington, U.S.
- Height: 6 ft 1 in (1.85 m)
- Weight: 170 lb (77 kg; 12 st)

Career
- Sport: Golf
- College: Pepperdine University
- Turned professional: 2011
- Current tour: PGA Tour
- Former tour: Web.com Tour
- Professional wins: 3
- Highest ranking: 43 (August 18, 2019) (as of October 25, 2026)

Number of wins by tour
- PGA Tour: 1
- Korn Ferry Tour: 2

Best results in major championships
- Masters Tournament: CUT: 2020
- PGA Championship: T53: 2024
- U.S. Open: T31: 2022
- The Open Championship: T32: 2019

Andrew David Putnam (born January 25, 1989) is an American professional golfer on the PGA Tour.

== Early life and amateur career ==
Born and raised in Tacoma, Washington, Putnam graduated high school in 2007 from Life Christian Academy. His older brother Michael has also played on the PGA Tour.

Putnam played college golf in southern California at Pepperdine University in Malibu from 2007 to 2011. He won two tournaments and was a three time All-American.

== Professional career ==
In 2011, Putnam turned professional and he played on the eGolf Professional Tour in 2012. He first played on the Web.com Tour in 2013 and was 49th on the money list, not enough to earn a PGA Tour card. Putnam won for the first time as a professional in April 2014 at the WNB Golf Classic on the Web.com Tour. He made his PGA Tour debut at the Shell Houston Open in 2014, where he played in the same tournament as Michael, but missed the cut. Putnam finished eighth in the Web.com Tour Finals that year to earn his PGA Tour card for the 2014–15 season.

In the 2014-15 PGA Tour Season Putnam missed the cut in 13 out of 23 events. He finished 192nd in the season-long FedEx Cup and lost his tour card, returning to the Web.com Tour for the 2016 season.

In the 2016 Web.com Tour season he finished 41st on the money list and won $125,981, not enough to earn a PGA Tour card. In the 2017 Web.com Tour Putnam won $266,296 and finished 8th in the regular season. He also won the Panama Claro Championship in February 2017. He regained his PGA Tour card for the 2017-18 PGA Tour Season.

Putnam had his first PGA Tour win in August 2018 at the Barracuda Championship, an alternate event near Reno, Nevada. He finished the 2017-18 PGA Tour Season with five Top 10s and earned $2,387,382. He finished 35th in the season-long FedEx Cup.

On October 28, 2018, Putnam tied for 4th in the WGC-HSBC Champions tournament in China, earning $393,000.

== Amateur wins ==
- 2010 Pacific Coast Amateur

== Professional wins (3) ==
=== PGA Tour wins (1) ===
No.	Date	Tournament	Winning score	Margin of victory	Runner-up
1	Aug 5, 2018	Barracuda Championship	47 pts (6-17-15-9=47)	4 points	(United States) Chad Campbell

=== Web.com Tour wins (2) ===
No.	Date	Tournament	Winning score	Margin of victory	Runner(s)-up
1	Apr 26, 2014	WNB Golf Classic	−20 (66-66-64=196) (Note: Shortened to 54 holes due to weather.)	7 strokes	(Sweden) Richard S. Johnson, (Australia) Rod Pampling
2	Feb 19, 2017	Panama Claro Championship	−13 (64-68-67-68=267)	Playoff	(United States) Chris Baker

Web.com Tour playoff record (1–0)

No.	Year	Tournament	Opponent	Result
1	2017	Panama Claro Championship	(United States) Chris Baker	Won with birdie on first extra hole

== Results in major championships ==
Results not in chronological order in 2020.

Tournament	2010	2011	2012	2013	2014	2015	2016	2017	2018
Masters Tournament									
U.S. Open	CUT								
The Open Championship									
PGA Championship									T59

Tournament	2019	2020	2021	2022	2023	2024	2025	2026
Masters Tournament		CUT						
PGA Championship	T78	CUT			CUT	T53		T55
U.S. Open	T43	WD		T31	T43			T65
The Open Championship	T32	NT			T55			

Did not play

CUT = missed the half-way cut
WD = withdrew
"T" indicates a tie for a place
NT = no tournament due to COVID-19 pandemic

=== Summary ===
Tournament	Wins	2nd	3rd	Top-5	Top-10	Top-25	Events	Cuts made
Masters Tournament	0	0	0	0	0	0	1	0
PGA Championship	0	0	0	0	0	0	6	4
U.S. Open	0	0	0	0	0	0	6	4
The Open Championship	0	0	0	0	0	0	2	2
Totals	0	0	0	0	0	0	15	10

- Most consecutive cuts made – 5 (2023 U.S. Open – 2026 U.S. Open, current)

== Results in The Players Championship ==
Tournament	2019	2020	2021	2022	2023	2024	2025	2026
The Players Championship	CUT	C	CUT	CUT	CUT	53	CUT	T32

CUT = missed the halfway cut
"T" indicates a tie for a place
C = canceled after the first round due to the COVID-19 pandemic

== Results in World Golf Championships ==
Tournament	2018	2019	2020	2021	2022	2023
Championship						
Match Play		T40	NT^{1}			R16
Invitational		T24				
Champions	T4	T36	NT^{1}	NT^{1}	NT^{1}	

^{1}Cancelled due to COVID-19 pandemic

Top 10
Did not play

NT = No tournament
"T" = tied
QF, R16, R32, R64 = Round in which player lost in match play
Note that the Championship and Invitational were discontinued from 2022. The Champions was discontinued from 2023.

== See also ==
- 2014 Web.com Tour Finals graduates
- 2017 Web.com Tour Finals graduates
