= WNB Golf Classic =

Coordinates: 32.065°N 102.095°W

Tournament information
- Location: Midland, Texas
- Established: 1992
- Course: Midland Country Club
- Par: 72
- Length: 7,380 yards (6,750 m)
- Tour: Web.com Tour
- Format: Stroke play
- Prize fund: US$600,000
- Month played: April
- Final year: 2014

Tournament record score
- Aggregate: 264 Chad Campbell (2001)
- To par: −24 as above

Final champion
- (United States) Andrew Putnam

Location map
- Location in the United States Location in Texas

The WNB Golf Classic was a professional golf tournament in the United States on the Web.com Tour. It was played annually at the Midland Country Club in Midland, Texas, and the title sponsor was Western National Bank.

It debuted in 1992 as the Ben Hogan Permian Basin Open at the Club at Mission Dorado in Odessa. The purse was $150,000 and the winner's share of $30,000 went to Taylor Smith on August 30. The course is now part of the Odessa Country Club.

For its 23rd and final edition in 2014, the purse had quadrupled to $600,000 and Andrew Putnam took the winner's share of $108,000.

== Winners ==
Year	Winner	Score	To par	Margin of victory	Runner(s)-up
WNB Golf Classic
2014	(United States) Andrew Putnam	196 (Note: Shortened to 54 holes due to strong winds.)	−20	7 strokes	(Sweden) Richard S. Johnson (Australia) Rod Pampling
2013	(United States) Alex Aragon	272	−16	1 stroke	(United States) Byron Smith
2012	(United States) Luke Guthrie	271	−17	1 stroke	(New Zealand) Danny Lee (Australia) Cameron Percy
2011	(New Zealand) Danny Lee	270	−18	Playoff	(United States) Harris English
2010	(United States) Nate Smith	270	−18	2 strokes	(Argentina) Fabián Gómez (United States) Brandt Jobe (Australia) Alistair Presnell
2009	(United States) Garrett Willis	268	−20	1 stroke	(United States) Chad Collins
2008	(Australia) Marc Leishman	267	−21	11 strokes	(United States) Keoke Cotner
2007	(United States) Brad Adamonis	278	−10	Playoff	(South Africa) Tjaart van der Walt (United States) Vance Veazey (United States) Ron Whittaker
Permian Basin Charity Golf Classic
2006	(United States) Brandt Snedeker	272	−16	Playoff	(Australia) Aron Price
2005	(United States) Kris Cox	270	−18	2 strokes	(Australia) Craig Bowden (United States) Jerry Smith (United States) Chris Tidland
2004	(United States) Charley Hoffman	282	−6	Playoff	(United States) Jeff Gove (South Africa) Craig Lile
2003	(United States) D. J. Brigman	272	−16	1 stroke	(United States) Jason Dufner (Australia) Mark Hensby (United States) Jimmy Walker
Permian Basin Open
2002	(United States) Tag Ridings	272	−16	Playoff	(Australia) Mark Hensby
Buy.com Permian Basin Open
2001	(United States) Chad Campbell	264	−24	4 strokes	(United States) Todd Fischer
2000	(United States) Kevin Johnson	268	−20	3 strokes	(Australia) Mark Hensby
Nike Permian Basin Open
1999	(United States) David Berganio Jr.	269	−19	2 strokes	(Australia) Paul Gow (United States) Dicky Thompson
1998	(United States) Stiles Mitchell	276	−12	Playoff	(United States) Woody Austin (United States) Jeff Barlow
1997	(Australia) Paul Gow	267	−21	2 strokes	(United States) Steve Lamontagne
1996	(United States) Michael Christie	270	−18	2 strokes	(United States) Anthony Rodriguez
1995	(United States) Hugh Royer III	275	−13	1 stroke	(United States) Paul Claxton (United States) Frank Conner (United States) Kawika Cotner (United States) Franklin Langham (United States) Dave Miley (United States) Chris Smith (New Zealand) Phil Tataurangi
1994	(United States) Bruce Vaughan	269	−19	4 strokes	(United States) Gary Rusnak (United States) Bob Wolcott
1993	(United States) Franklin Langham	202	−14	Playoff	(United States) Doug Martin
Ben Hogan Permian Basin Open
1992	(United States) Taylor Smith	204	−12	1 stroke	(United States) Pete Jordan (United States) Andy Morse
