= Adamonis =

- Lithuanian surname
- m.: Adamonis
- f.: (unmarried): Adamonytė
- f.: (married): Adamonienė

Adamonis is a Lithuanian family name. Notable people with the surname include:

- Adam Adamonis, Polish professional dancer and actor
- Brad Adamonis, American professional golfer
- Marius Adamonis, Lithuanian professional footballer
