= Vance Veazey =

American professional golfer

Personal information
- Nationality: United States
- Born: June 25, 1965 (age 61) Memphis, Tennessee, U.S.
- Height: 5 ft 9 in (1.75 m)
- Weight: 190 lb (86 kg; 14 st)

Career
- Sport: Golf
- College: University of Mississippi
- Turned professional: 1990
- Former tours: PGA Tour; Web.com Tour; NGA Hooters Tour
- Professional wins: 8

Number of wins by tour
- Korn Ferry Tour: 4
- Other: 4

Vance Veazey (born June 25, 1965) is an American professional golfer who has played on the PGA Tour and the Web.com Tour.

Veazey was born in Memphis, Tennessee. He graduated from the University of Mississippi in 1989 with a Bachelor of Business Administration degree. He turned pro in 1990.

Veazey has played on the Nationwide Tour (1995, 1999–2002, 2004–05 and 2007–09) and PGA Tour (1998, 2003 and 2006). While he has four wins on the Nationwide Tour, he has only one top-10 finish on the PGA Tour. He has also played on the NGA Hooters Tour where he has four wins.

In 2009, Veazey finished 23rd on the Nationwide Tour money list to earn his 2010 PGA Tour card.

== Professional wins (8) ==
=== Nationwide Tour wins (4) ===
No.	Date	Tournament	Winning score	Margin of victory	Runner(s)-up
1	Apr 12, 1998	Nike Shreveport Open	−8 (76-70-65-69=280)	Playoff	(United States) John Wilson
2	May 9, 1999	Nike Carolina Classic	−15 (68-67-67-67=269)	1 stroke	(United States) Steve Haskins, (Canada) Glen Hnatiuk
3	Jan 30, 2005	BellSouth Panama Championship	−8 (65-71-66-70=272)	1 stroke	(United States) Shane Bertsch, (United States) Jim McGovern, (Canada) Jon Mills, (Colombia) Camilo Villegas
4	Feb 8, 2009	Panama Digicel Championship (2)	−7 (67-69-68-69=273)	Playoff	(United States) Garrett Willis

Nationwide Tour playoff record (2–1)

No.	Year	Tournament	Opponent(s)	Result
1	1998	Nike Shreveport Open	(United States) John Wilson	Won with birdie on first extra hole
2	2007	WNB Golf Classic	(United States) Brad Adamonis, (South Africa) Tjaart van der Walt, (United States) Ron Whittaker	Adamonis won with par on eighth extra hole Veazey eliminated by par on second hole Whittaker eliminated by par on first hole
3	2009	Panama Digicel Championship	(United States) Garrett Willis	Won with par on second extra hole

=== NGA Hooters Tour wins (4) ===
No.	Date	Tournament	Winning score	Margin of victory	Runner(s)-up
1	Jul 31, 1994	Pepsi Open	−20 (66-69-68-65=268)	2 strokes	(United States) Brian Kontak, (United States) Andy Morse
2	Jun 9, 1996	Bud Light-Heller Ford Classic	−11 (69-69-64-71=273)	1 stroke	(United States) Ty Armstrong
3	Aug 4, 1996	Pepsi Cola Open	−20 (67-65-67-69=268)	Playoff	(United States) Kyle Flinton
4	Jun 22, 1997	Collins Pro Classic	−16 (69-66-70-67=272)	2 strokes	(United States) Steve Ford

== See also ==
- 1997 PGA Tour Qualifying School graduates
- 2002 PGA Tour Qualifying School graduates
- 2005 Nationwide Tour graduates
- 2009 Nationwide Tour graduates
- List of golfers with most Web.com Tour wins
