= Garrett Willis =

American professional golfer (born 1973)

Personal information
- Full name: Garrett Michael Willis
- Nationality: United States
- Born: November 21, 1973 (age 52) Charlotte, North Carolina, U.S.
- Height: 6 ft 1 in (1.85 m)
- Weight: 175 lb (79 kg; 12.5 st)

Career
- Sport: Golf
- College: East Tennessee State University
- Turned professional: 1996
- Former tours: PGA Tour; Nationwide Tour; NGA Hooters Tour
- Professional wins: 9

Number of wins by tour
- PGA Tour: 1
- Korn Ferry Tour: 2
- Other: 6

Best results in major championships
- Masters Tournament: DNP
- PGA Championship: DNP
- U.S. Open: CUT: 1998, 1999
- The Open Championship: DNP

Garrett Michael Willis (born November 21, 1973) is an American professional golfer who plays on the PGA Tour and the Nationwide Tour.

== Early life ==
Willis was born in Charlotte, North Carolina. He attended East Tennessee State University where he was member of the golf team, a first-team All-American his senior year. He won the Canadian Amateur Championship in 1995. He graduated in 1996.

== Professional career ==
In 1996, Willis turned pro. Willis began his career in professional golf playing on the Hooters Tour and in selected international events. He then moved up to the BUY.COM Tour (the precursor of the Nationwide Tour). Willis made his debut on the PGA Tour at the Touchstone Energy Tucson Open in 2001, and became the fourth Tour player to win in his first start as a member joining Marty Fleckman (1967), Ben Crenshaw (1973) and Robert Gamez (1990).

In recent years, Willis has split his playing time between the PGA Tour and the Nationwide Tour. He posted a Nationwide Tour victory in 2005 at the Envirocare Utah Classic. He came close to winning again on the Nationwide Tour in 2007, when he and Justin Bolli finished tied for second, a single stroke behind Jay Williamson in the Fort Smith Classic.

Willis won again in 2009 on the Nationwide Tour at the WNB Golf Classic by one stroke over Chad Collins. He finished 12th on the money list to earn his 2010 PGA Tour card.

Willis last played a PGA Tour event in 2016.

== Personal life ==
Willis lives in Knoxville, Tennessee with his wife, Jennifer.

== Professional wins (9) ==
=== PGA Tour wins (1) ===
| No. | Date | Tournament | Winning score | Margin of victory | Runner-up |
|---|---|---|---|---|---|
| 1 | Jan 15, 2001 | Touchstone Energy Tucson Open | −15 (71-69-64-69=273) | 1 stroke | (United States) Kevin Sutherland |

=== Nationwide Tour wins (2) ===
| No. | Date | Tournament | Winning score | Margin of victory | Runner(s)-up |
|---|---|---|---|---|---|
| 1 | Sep 11, 2005 | Envirocare Utah Classic | −13 (67-71-67-70=275) | 1 stroke | (United States) Kris Cox, (Australia) Mathew Goggin, (United States) Brian Henninger |
| 2 | Sep 27, 2009 | WNB Golf Classic | −20 (64-69-67-68=268) | 1 stroke | (United States) Chad Collins |

Nationwide Tour playoff record (0–1)

| No. | Year | Tournament | Opponent | Result |
|---|---|---|---|---|
| 1 | 2009 | Panama Digicel Championship | (United States) Vance Veazey | Lost to par on second extra hole |

=== NGA Hooters Tour wins (2) ===
| No. | Date | Tournament | Winning score | Margin of victory | Runner-up |
|---|---|---|---|---|---|
| 1 | Jun 30, 1996 | Decatur Daily Championship | −13 (69-72-70-64=275) | 2 strokes | (United States) Vance Veazey |
| 2 | Mar 29, 1998 | Jackaroo Classic | −17 (65-71-69-66=271) | 3 strokes | (United States) Zoran Zorkic |

=== Other wins (4) ===
- 1997 Panama Open
- 2000 Tennessee Open
- 2013 Tennessee Open
- 2015 Tennessee Open

== Results in major championships ==
| Tournament | 1998 | 1999 |
|---|---|---|
| U.S. Open | CUT | CUT |

Note: Willis only played in the U.S. Open.
CUT = missed the half-way cut

== See also ==
- 2000 PGA Tour Qualifying School graduates
- 2009 Nationwide Tour graduates
