= Taylor Smith (golfer) =

American golfer

Personal information
- Full name: Richard Taylor Smith
- Nationality: United States
- Born: June 28, 1967 Pensacola, Florida, U.S.
- Died: July 21, 2007 (aged 40) Houston, Texas, U.S.
- Height: 6 ft 3 in (1.91 m)
- Weight: 185 lb (84 kg; 13.2 st)

Career
- Sport: Golf
- College: Augusta College
- Status: Professional
- Former tours: PGA Tour; Ben Hogan Tour; U.S. Golf Tour
- Professional wins: 7

Number of wins by tour
- Korn Ferry Tour: 1
- Other: 6

Best results in major championships
- Masters Tournament: DNP
- PGA Championship: T53: 1997
- U.S. Open: DNP
- The Open Championship: DNP

Richard Taylor Smith (June 28, 1967 – July 21, 2007) was an American professional golfer.

== Early life and amateur career ==
Smith was born in Pensacola, Florida but spent most of his life in Waycross, Georgia. He played college golf at Augusta College.

== Professional career ==
Smith played on the Nike Tour and the PGA Tour from 1992 to 1998. His best finish on the Nike Tour (1992–1995, 1998) was a win at the 1992 Ben Hogan Permian Basin Open. His best finish on the PGA Tour (1996–1997) was T-2 at the 1996 Greater Vancouver Open.

At the 1996 Walt Disney World/Oldsmobile Classic on the PGA Tour, Smith had tied Tiger Woods at the end of regulation play and appeared to be heading for a playoff. It was then revealed that Smith's putter had an illegal grip and he was disqualified, giving Woods his second career win. Smith had been informed about his putter on the 9th hole but was allowed to continue playing while he appealed the ruling. The appeal was denied.

== Professional wins (7) ==
=== Ben Hogan Tour wins (1) ===
No.	Date	Tournament	Winning score	Margin of victory	Runners-up
1	Aug 30, 1992	Ben Hogan Permian Basin Open	−12 (70-66-68=204)	1 stroke	(United States) Pete Jordan, (United States) Andy Morse

=== U.S. Golf Tour wins (1) ===
- 1990 Turtle Classic

=== Other mini-tour wins (5) ===
- 1988 Walden Lake CC (Space Coast Tour)
- 1989 Deltona Hills CC (Space Coast Tour)
- 1990 Timacuan CC (Space Coast Tour)
- 1991 West Orange CC (Space Coast Tour)
- 1993 Palisades CC (Space Coast Tour)

== See also ==
- 1995 PGA Tour Qualifying School graduates
