= Beth McLachlin =

American volleyball player and coach (born 1950)

- Born: Beth Hollinger; 1950 (age 74–75)
- Education: B.A., University of Hawaii
- Occupation: Coach
- Known for: Olympic athlete
- Children: 3; including Parker McLachlin

Beth McLachlin (nee Hollinger; born 1950) is an American former volleyball player and coach. She competed for Team USA at the 1968 Summer Olympics, 1970 FIVB Volleyball Women's World Championship, and various Women's NORCECA Volleyball Championship. She is the mother of golfer Parker McLachlin.

== Education and career ==
McLachlin and her husband Chris moved to Honolulu in 1970. She attended the University of Hawaii where she competed on the Hawaii Rainbow Wahine volleyball. As Title IX had been passed upon her enrollment, McLachlin competed on the university's first women's volleyball team in 1974. As a member of the team, McLachlin was elected a United States Volleyball Association All-American twice as she guided them to two Association for Intercollegiate Athletics for Women (AIAW) National Championships matches. While enrolled in University, McLachlin participated in the 1970 World Games, 1973 World University Games, and was named captain of Team USA in 1976. She was also a member of Team USAs 1968 Olympic Women's Volleyball Team as an alternate and was named United States Volleyball Association (USVBA) Rookie of the Year. During her tenure with Team USA, McLachlin was named a USVBA All-American seven times.

In 1977, McLachlin accepted a position at La Pietra as their athletic director, a role she stayed in until 2000. A few years later, McLachlin was inducted into the University of Hawaii's Sports Circle of Honor. In 2019, McLachlin was inducted into the USA Volleyball Hall of Fame.

== Personal life ==
McLachlin and her husband Chris have three children together; including golfer Parker McLachlin.
