= Martin Laird =

Scottish professional golfer (born 1982)

Personal information
- Full name: Martin Charles Campbell Laird
- Nationality: Scotland
- Born: 29 December 1982 (age 43) Glasgow, Scotland
- Height: 6 ft 2 in (1.88 m)
- Weight: 190 lb (86 kg; 14 st)
- Spouse: Meagan Franks
- Children: 2

Career
- Sport: Golf
- College: Colorado State University
- Turned professional: 2004
- Current tour: PGA Tour
- Former tours: European Tour; Nationwide Tour; Gateway Tour
- Professional wins: 8
- Highest ranking: 21 (27 March 2011)

Number of wins by tour
- PGA Tour: 4
- Korn Ferry Tour: 1
- Other: 3

Best results in major championships
- Masters Tournament: T20: 2011
- PGA Championship: T23: 2021
- U.S. Open: T21: 2013
- The Open Championship: T44: 2013

Martin Charles Campbell Laird (born 29 December 1982) is a Scottish professional golfer, playing on the PGA Tour. He has won four PGA Tour events in his career, most recently the Shriners Hospitals for Children Open in 2020. Until Russell Knox earned his card via the 2011 Nationwide Tour, Laird was the only Scottish player on the PGA Tour.

== Early life ==
In 1982, Laird was born in Glasgow, Scotland. He played his Junior golf at Kirkintilloch Golf Club and then moving to play his youth golf at Hilton Park Golf Club. Laird learned to play golf left-handed but eventually switched to playing right-handed.

Laird's cousin David Weatherston is a Scottish professional football player.

== Amateur career ==
In 2000, at the age of 17 and with the assistance of College Prospects of America, Laird moved to the United States to take up a golf scholarship at Colorado State University under head coach Jamie Bermel. He played for the Colorado State Rams in the Mountain West Conference which had been established in 1999. Playing for four years from 2000–01 to 2003–04 he won four individual titles in college events. His wins were in the Mountain West Conference Men's Golf Championship (1 May 2002), El Diablo Intercollegiate (16 March 2003), Ping Golf Cougar Classic (26 April 2003) and Border Olympics (2 April 2004). In his last 3 years he was selected as one of the All Mountain West Conference Selections. He graduated with a degree in marketing in 2004.

In 2009 he was selected as a member of the "Mountain West Men's Golf 10th Anniversary Team".

== Professional career ==
In 2004, Laird turned professional. He won his second professional tournament, the 2004 Denver Open, winning $12,000. In 2004, he played in a single Nationwide Tour event, the Envirocare Utah Classic, but did not make the cut. At the end of 2004, he qualified for the final stage of the 2004 PGA Tour Qualifying School graduates. He finished at one-over-par for a tie for 96th place, 18 shots behind the winner, fellow Brit, Brian Davis. This gave Laird conditional status for the 2005 Nationwide tour.

=== Nationwide Tour ===
In 2005 he concentrated full-time on the Nationwide Tour. He had only limited success with a best position of tied 18th in 19 events and earnings of $18,488 placed him 156th in the Nationwide Tour's money list.

During 2006 Laird won the San Juan Open and a tournament on the Gateway Tour, a third-tier tour, at The Wigwam Golf Resort and Spa in Arizona. He did not play on the Nationwide Tour but, as in 2004, he qualified for the final stage of the PGA Tour Qualifying School. His 2 under par total left him tied for 64th place, giving him full status on the Nationwide Tour for 2007.

In 2007 he again played on the Nationwide Tour, playing a total of 27 events. He won the Athens Regional Foundation Classic in April, earning him $90,000 and then finished tied 3rd in the season-ending Nationwide Tour Championship. His $252,679 earnings placed him 13th place on the Nationwide Tour's money list, to earn his PGA Tour card for 2008.

He qualified for the 2007 U.S. Open, his first major, but scored 76 and 79 and didn't make the cut. He ended the year at 251 in the Official World Golf Rankings.

=== PGA Tour ===
In his first season on the PGA Tour, Laird struggled in the first half of the year making the cut only 6 times in 14 events and with a best position of 55th. He showed an improvement in form in July but his main success came in August. He had tied 4th in the Legends Reno-Tahoe Open and then tied 4th again in the Wyndham Championship. These results took him to 128th in the FedEx Cup standings and entry into The Barclays, the first of the FedEx Cup Playoff events. He tied for 7th in this event. The three successive tournaments had earned him $546,225. His good performance in The Barclays raised him to 67 in the FedEx Cup standings giving him entries into the Deutsche Bank Championship and the BMW Championship. He eventually finished at 67 in the FedEx Cup standings and he took $110,000 of the Bonus Pool.

Before the final event of the season, the Children's Miracle Network Classic, he was 126th in the PGA Tour's money list behind Shane Bertsch. Only the top 125 would retain their cards for the 2009 season. Bertsch failed to make the cut and with Laird finishing the tournament tied for 21st, the $49,680 he won gave him 125th place on the PGA Tour's money list $11,504 ahead of Bertsch, who dropped to 126th. Had he missed an 8-foot par putt at the final hole, his earnings would have dropped by some $15,000. Laird's season earnings were $852,752. He ended the year ranked 268 in the World Rankings.

As in 2008 Laird had a poor start to the year. Before the Legends Reno-Tahoe Open in August, he had made the cut just 7 times in 19 PGA Tour events and had had a run of 7 successive missed cuts.

On 26 May, Laird secured a place at the 2009 Open Championship after making it through the American qualifier in Texas. He shot rounds of 67 and 65 to share the third spot. In the tournament itself, he scored 74 and 72 to miss the cut by two strokes. The previous week he had finished 10th in the Scottish Open, his first professional tournament in his native Scotland.

On 8 June, Laird made it through qualification for the U.S. Open, set for the Black Course at Bethpage State Park. He gained one of the 13 spots available with rounds of 67 and 70, to make it in by one shot. In the tournament itself, he scored 74 and 71 to miss the cut by one stroke.

In August, Laird finished tied for second in the Legends Reno-Tahoe Open, an alternate event played at the same time as the 2009 WGC-Bridgestone Invitational. He won $264,000 and raised his Official World Golf Ranking from 303 to 236.

Later in 2009, Laird won the Justin Timberlake Shriners Hospitals for Children Open in a three-man playoff for his first PGA Tour win, securing his Tour card for 2010 and 2011. He took the first prize of $756,000 and jumped from 134th to 62nd on the money list. By winning that tournament he became the first Scot to win a PGA Tour event in America since Sandy Lyle won the 1988 Masters Tournament, and the first Scotsman to win any PGA Tour event since Paul Lawrie's 1999 Open Championship triumph. Laird became the highest ranked Scot in the Official World Golf Rankings, his ranking rising from 237 to 108. The victory also gave him qualification for his first WGC event, the 2009 WGC-HSBC Champions tournament, where he finished tied for 54th place.

Laird played most of his golf on the PGA Tour in 2010. He tied for 4th in season-opening Hyundai Tournament of Champions and tied 10th in the Crowne Plaza Invitational at Colonial.

Laird finished 95th in the regular season FedEx Cup standings. He played well in The Barclays tournament, the first FedEx Cup playoff event, at the Ridgewood Country Club in late August. After 3 rounds of 69, 67 and 65 he held a 3 shot lead. After birdies at the first two holes he then went 7,5 to drop 3 shots at the next two holes. A birdie at the 17th, where he holed from 7 feet, gave him a one-stroke lead over Matt Kuchar and meant he needed to par the 18th to win. He hit the green in 2 but then 3 putted from 30 feet, this time missing a 7-foot putt which would have won the tournament outright, and fell into a tie with Kuchar. Kuchar birdied the first playoff hole, the 18th, following a spectacular recovery shot from the left rough, which finished two feet from the pin; Laird, in the right rough from the tee, hit the green, but had a long birdie putt which he missed. The second-place finish earned Laird $810,000, left him 3rd in the revised FedEx Cup standings, and boosted his world ranking from 120 to a new personal high of 61.

This performance earned him entry into the remaining FedEx Cup events. He eventually finished 11th in the final FedEx Cup standings and took $300,000 in Bonus Money, despite finishing last in The Tour Championship.

Laird had a rare European outing when he finished tied for 5th in the Alfred Dunhill Links Championship in October and then two weeks later returned to Las Vegas to defend the Justin Timberlake Shriners Hospitals for Children Open title that he won in 2009. Laird missed a 25-foot putt on the 72nd hole. A three-man playoff then ensued with Laird being joined by Cameron Percy and Jonathan Byrd. Martin had more chances to win but missed putts of varying lengths at the first three sudden-death playoff holes. This was to prove costly as on the 4th playoff hole, Byrd, who had the honour, made the first ever hole in one in a playoff in PGA Tour history to win the title. The tie for 2nd place lifted Laird to a career high world ranking of 55. The following week, he tied for 3rd place in the CIMB Asia Pacific Classic Malaysia, two shots behind winner Ben Crane, lifting him into the world top 50 with a new ranking to 49.

Despite his win in 2009, Laird did not gain automatic qualification for the first three majors of 2010, as the win was not at a regular season or full-field event, nor was he high enough in the OWGR. He qualified for the Open Championship at the Old Course at St Andrews with rounds of 69 and 63 at Gleneagles Golf & Country Club in Texas, but had rounds of 74 and 83 to miss the cut by 11 shots. He did get automatic qualification for the PGA Championship (winners of PGA Tour events get automatic entry into the PGA Championship regardless of status) and, with rounds of 70 and 74, made his first cut in a major championship. Further rounds of 72 and 73 left him tied for 48th place.

Laird's good form in the latter part of 2010 continued in early 2011. In February, he tied for 3rd in the Waste Management Phoenix Open, lifting his world ranking to 41. In March, he tied for 10th in the WGC-Cadillac Championship and tied for 5th in the Transitions Championship, his ranking rising to 40.

On 27 March 2011, Laird claimed the biggest title of his career at the Arnold Palmer Invitational taking the first prize of $1,080,000. After three rounds of 70, 65 and 70 Laird had a two shot lead over Spencer Levin with Steve Marino and Bubba Watson a further two strokes behind. Laird dropped three shots on the front nine and then had a double-bogey at the 11th. At this stage Levin was also five over par for his round but Marino was two under par, resulting in a seven shot swing and leaving Laird three shots behind Marino. Laird scored three birdies and a bogey in the next five holes, while Marino scored a bogey and then a double-bogey at the par three 17th hole, leaving Laird now with a two shot lead. However Marino birdied the 18th, after holing an eight-foot putt, leaving Laird needing to par the last hole to win. His second shot was on the green but eighty three feet away. He two-putted for the victory. This ensured that he became first ever European winner of the Arnold Palmer Invitational. After the tournament his world ranking rose to 21.

By qualifying for the 2010 Tour Championship, Laird also qualified for his first Masters. Rounds of 74, 69, 69 and 73 left him tied 20th, his best finish in a major. However he failed to make the cut in the other three majors.

Following his victory in the Arnold Palmer Invitational he had other good results, finishing tied for 9th in the Valero Texas Open, tied for 10th in the Crowne Plaza Invitational at Colonial and tied for 11th in the WGC-Bridgestone Invitational. He finished 17th in the "regular season" FedEx Cup standings. Despite finishing tied for 12th in the BMW Championship he finished 31st in the FedEx Cup standings and did not qualify for The Tour Championship. Laird and Stephen Gallacher, representing Scotland, tied for 4th in the World Cup. By the end of 2011, Laird's world ranking had dropped to 47.

Laird started 2012 with second place in the season opening Hyundai Tournament of Champions, a result which lifted his world ranking to 33. Then in May 2012, Laird finished as runner up again at The Players Championship, two strokes behind winner Matt Kuchar. He had briefly led during the second round before finishing four over on the notoriously difficult 16–18 stretch. He then tied for the lead in the final round before a bogey on 18 put paid to his chances of victory.

On 7 April 2013, Laird won his third career PGA Tour event, the Valero Texas Open, by two strokes from Rory McIlroy. Starting the final round five shots behind overnight leader Billy Horschel, Laird fired a nine-under-par 63, including birdies at his last three holes, to take the title. The win meant that Laird was the last person to gain entry into the 2013 Masters Tournament, ending the streak of 16 consecutive American wins on the PGA Tour, 14 of them in the 2013 season.

In October 2020, Laird won the Shriners Hospitals for Children Open in Las Vegas, Nevada for the second time. He won in a playoff over Matthew Wolff and Austin Cook with a birdie on the second playoff hole.

== Game ==
Laird is a long hitter, ranking in the top 20 on the PGA Tour average driving distance statistic in 2009, 2010 and 2011.

He is currently coached by Mark McCann, having previously been coached by Randy Smith.

== Personal life ==
Laird married Meagan Franks on 31 July 2011. She is from Steamboat Springs, Colorado, and is the daughter of golf professional Hank Franks.

== Amateur wins ==
- 2003 Scottish Youths Championship

== Professional wins (8) ==
=== PGA Tour wins (4) ===
No.	Date	Tournament	Winning score	Margin of victory	Runner(s)-up
1	18 Oct 2009	Justin Timberlake Shriners Hospitals for Children Open	−19 (63-67-67-68=265)	Playoff	(United States) Chad Campbell, (United States) George McNeill
2	27 Mar 2011	Arnold Palmer Invitational	−8 (70-65-70-75=280)	1 stroke	(United States) Steve Marino
3	7 Apr 2013	Valero Texas Open	−14 (70-71-70-63=274)	2 strokes	(Northern Ireland) Rory McIlroy
4	11 Oct 2020	Shriners Hospitals for Children Open (2)	−23 (65-63-65-68=261)	Playoff	(United States) Austin Cook, (United States) Matthew Wolff

PGA Tour playoff record (2–2)

No.	Year	Tournament	Opponent(s)	Result
1	2009	Justin Timberlake Shriners Hospitals for Children Open	(United States) Chad Campbell, (United States) George McNeill	Won with birdie on third extra hole Campbell eliminated by par on second hole
2	2010	The Barclays	(United States) Matt Kuchar	Lost to birdie on first extra hole
3	2010	Justin Timberlake Shriners Hospitals for Children Open	(United States) Jonathan Byrd, (Australia) Cameron Percy	Byrd won with eagle on fourth extra hole
4	2020	Shriners Hospitals for Children Open	(United States) Austin Cook, (United States) Matthew Wolff	Won with birdie on second extra hole

=== Nationwide Tour wins (1) ===
No.	Date	Tournament	Winning score	Margin of victory	Runners-up
1	22 Apr 2007	Athens Regional Foundation Classic	−16 (66-67-70-69=272)	1 stroke	(United States) Jeremy Anderson, (United States) Justin Bolli

=== Gateway Tour wins (2) ===
No.	Date	Tournament	Winning score	Margin of victory	Runner-up
1	2 Mar 2006	Desert Spring A8	−10 (71-69-66=206)	1 stroke	(United States) Jeff Overton
2	29 Mar 2006	Desert Spring B3	−9 (68-67-72=207)	3 strokes	(United States) Gibby Martens

=== Other wins (1) ===
- 2006 San Juan Open

== Results in major championships ==
Results not in chronological order in 2020.

Tournament	2007	2008	2009
Masters Tournament			
U.S. Open	CUT		CUT
The Open Championship			CUT
PGA Championship			

Tournament	2010	2011	2012	2013	2014	2015	2016	2017	2018
Masters Tournament		T20	T57	CUT					
U.S. Open		CUT	CUT	T21				T32	
The Open Championship	CUT	CUT	T72	T44				CUT	
PGA Championship	T48	CUT	T42	CUT		CUT		CUT	

Tournament	2019	2020	2021
Masters Tournament			T38
PGA Championship			T23
U.S. Open			CUT
The Open Championship		NT	

Did not play

CUT = missed the halfway cut
"T" = tied
NT = No tournament due to COVID-19 pandemic

=== Summary ===
Tournament	Wins	2nd	3rd	Top-5	Top-10	Top-25	Events	Cuts made
Masters Tournament	0	0	0	0	0	1	4	3
U.S. Open	0	0	0	0	0	1	7	2
The Open Championship	0	0	0	0	0	0	6	2
PGA Championship	0	0	0	0	0	1	7	3
Totals	0	0	0	0	0	3	24	10

- Most consecutive cuts made – 2 (three times)
- Longest streak of top-10s – 0

== Results in The Players Championship ==
Tournament	2009	2010	2011	2012	2013	2014	2015	2016	2017	2018	2019	2020	2021	2022	2023	2024
The Players Championship	T71	CUT	T69	T2	T5	CUT		CUT	CUT	T57	CUT	C	T69	CUT	CUT	T54

Top 10
Did not play

CUT = missed the halfway cut
"T" indicates a tie for a place
C = Cancelled after the first round due to the COVID-19 pandemic

== Results in World Golf Championships ==
Results not in chronological order before 2015.

Tournament	2009	2010	2011	2012	2013	2014	2015	2016	2017	2018	2019	2020	2021
Championship			T10	T24									
Match Play			R64	QF								NT^{1}	
Invitational		T16	T11	T29	T48								T57
Champions	T54											NT^{1}	NT^{1}

^{1}Cancelled due to COVID-19 pandemic

Top 10
Did not play

NT = No tournament
QF, R16, R32, R64 = Round in which player lost in match play
"T" = tied

== Career earnings by year ==
Official earnings on the PGA Tour.

Season	Earnings (US$)	Rank
2007	0	n/a
2008	852,752	125
2009	1,349,354	65
2010	2,137,928	35
2011	2,676,509	23
2012	2,172,883	36
2013	1,755,393	45
2014	583,663	138
2015	1,124,988	90
2016	1,224,680	86
2017	1,759,706	60
2018	1,017,580	114
2019	863,054	129
2020	232,786	183
Total	17,751,275	100

Although Laird plays most of his golf on the PGA Tour, he has earned money in some tournaments which have not qualified for official PGA Tour earnings:

- 2009: Barclays Scottish Open (€69,521), WGC-HSBC Champions ($36,500)
- 2010: Barclays Scottish Open (€32,667), Alfred Dunhill Links Championship (€124,594), CIMB Asia Pacific Classic Malaysia ($403,000)
- 2011: Barclays Scottish Open (€8,089)
- 2012: Aberdeen Asset Management Scottish Open (€38,388)
- 2013: Aberdeen Asset Management Scottish Open (€124,386)
- 2014: Aberdeen Asset Management Scottish Open (€21,820)

== Team appearances ==
Amateur

- European Boys' Team Championship (representing Scotland): 2000 (winners)
- European Youths' Team Championship (representing Scotland): 2002

Professional

- World Cup (representing Scotland): 2011, 2013, 2018

== See also ==
- 2007 Nationwide Tour graduates
