= Jay Williamson =

American professional golfer (born 1967)

Personal information
- Full name: Justin Arch Williamson IV
- Nickname: Jay
- Nationality: United States
- Born: February 7, 1967 (age 59) St. Louis, Missouri, U.S.
- Height: 5 ft 10 in (1.78 m)
- Weight: 180 lb (82 kg; 13 st)
- Spouse: Marnie Williamson
- Children: 3

Career
- Sport: Golf
- College: Trinity College
- Turned professional: 1990
- Former tours: PGA Tour; Nationwide Tour
- Professional wins: 2

Number of wins by tour
- Korn Ferry Tour: 1

Best results in major championships
- Masters Tournament: DNP
- PGA Championship: DNP
- U.S. Open: T20: 2003
- The Open Championship: T39: 2008

Justin Arch "Jay" Williamson IV (born February 7, 1967) is an American professional golfer who has played on the PGA Tour and the Nationwide Tour.

== Early life and amateur career ==
Williamson was born in St. Louis, Missouri. He attended Trinity College and was a member of the Division III baseball and hockey teams. Williamson attended and graduated from Trinity College.

== Professional career ==
In 1990, Williamson turned pro. He has no PGA Tour victories, although he has finished second twice, both playoff losses – to Hunter Mahan at the 2007 Travelers Championship, and to Kenny Perry at the 2008 John Deere Classic. He won once on the Nationwide Tour: the 2007 Fort Smith Classic. He has more than $5.9 million in career earnings on the PGA Tour.

== Professional wins (2) ==
=== Nationwide Tour wins (1) ===
| No. | Date | Tournament | Winning score | Margin of victory | Runners-up |
|---|---|---|---|---|---|
| 1 | May 6, 2007 | Fort Smith Classic | −16 (69-66-66-63=264) | 1 stroke | (United States) Justin Bolli, (United States) Garrett Willis |

Nationwide Tour playoff record (0–1)

| No. | Year | Tournament | Opponent | Result |
|---|---|---|---|---|
| 1 | 1998 | Nike Omaha Classic | (United States) Matt Gogel | Lost to par on fourth extra hole |

=== Other wins (1) ===
- 1991 Kansas Open

== Playoff record ==
PGA Tour playoff record (0–2)

| No. | Year | Tournament | Opponent(s) | Result |
|---|---|---|---|---|
| 1 | 2007 | Travelers Championship | (United States) Hunter Mahan | Lost to birdie on first extra hole |
| 2 | 2008 | John Deere Classic | (United States) Brad Adamonis, (United States) Kenny Perry | Perry won with par on first extra hole |

== Results in major championships ==
| Tournament | 1999 | 2000 | 2001 | 2002 | 2003 | 2004 | 2005 | 2006 | 2007 | 2008 |
|---|---|---|---|---|---|---|---|---|---|---|
| U.S. Open | CUT | | DQ | | T20 | | | | | |
| The Open Championship | | | | | | | | | | T39 |

Did not play

CUT = missed the halfway cut
DQ = Disqualified
T = Tied
Note: Williamson never played in the Masters Tournament or the PGA Championship.

== See also ==
- 1994 PGA Tour Qualifying School graduates
- 1995 PGA Tour Qualifying School graduates
- 1998 PGA Tour Qualifying School graduates
- 1999 PGA Tour Qualifying School graduates
- 2009 PGA Tour Qualifying School graduates
