= 2007 PGA Tour Qualifying School graduates =

This is a list of the 26 players who earned their 2008 PGA Tour card through Q School in 2007.

Place	Player	PGA Tour starts	Cuts made	Notes
1	(United States) Frank Lickliter	362	230	2 PGA Tour wins
2	(Australia) Brett Rumford	4	2	3 European Tour wins
3	(United States) Chris Stroud	26	10	
4	(South Korea) Jin Park	7	1	
5	(United States) Jason Allred	33	9	
T6	(South Korea) Yang Yong-eun	14	8	1 European Tour win; 4 Japan Golf Tour wins; 1 Asian Tour win
T6	(United States) Tag Ridings	107	54	1 Nationwide Tour win
8	(United States) Todd Demsey	35	13	
T9	(United States) Brad Adamonis	7	1	1 Nationwide Tour win
T9	(United States) Travis Perkins	0	0	
T11	(United States) Kent Jones	267	133	2 Nationwide Tour wins
T11	(United States) Cody Freeman	1	0	
T11	(United States) Parker McLachlin	32	15	
T14	(United States) Duffy Waldorf	559	353	4 PGA Tour wins
T14	(New Zealand) Tim Wilkinson	1	1	
T14	(England) Kenneth Ferrie	10	5	2 European Tour wins
T14	(United States) Kevin Streelman	4	1	
T14	(United States) Dustin Johnson	1	0	Played in 2007 Walker Cup
T19	(Sweden) Richard S. Johnson	138	75	1 European Tour win
T19	(Paraguay) Carlos Franco	232	152	4 PGA Tour wins; played in 1998 and 2000 Presidents Cups
T19	(United States) Jim McGovern	353	187	1 PGA Tour win
T19	(United States) Tommy Gainey	1	0	
T23	(United States) John Merrick	30	16	1 Nationwide Tour win
T23	(United States) Bob Sowards	10	2	Won 2004 PGA Club Professional Championship
T23	(Spain) Alejandro Cañizares	3	2	1 European Tour win
T23	(Australia) David Lutterus	0	0	

- Players in yellow are 2008 PGA Tour rookies.

== 2008 Results ==
Player	Starts	Cuts made	Best finish	Money list rank	Earnings ($)
(United States) Frank Lickliter	32	22	T13	149	548,113
(Australia) Brett Rumford*	26	10	T8	167	386,419
(United States) Chris Stroud	29	12	T6	155	482,405
(South Korea) Jin Park*	30	13	T18	196	227,102
(United States) Jason Allred	23	7	T28	221	100,596
(South Korea) Yang Yong-eun*	29	17	T9	157	461,726
(United States) Tag Ridings	29	14	T9	147	568,494
(United States) Todd Demsey	25	14	T19	197	217,417
(United States) Brad Adamonis*	29	14	T2	124	862,413
(United States) Travis Perkins*	23	3	T39	236	36,583
(United States) Kent Jones	23	11	T19	177	304,432
(United States) Cody Freeman*	26	6	T45	228	68,673
(United States) Parker McLachlin	27	17	Win	84	1,311,839
(United States) Duffy Waldorf	4	1	T61	258	7,350
(New Zealand) Tim Wilkinson*	29	17	T2	92	1,167,607
(England) Kenneth Ferrie*	25	12	T13	182	288,772
(United States) Kevin Streelman*	32	24	T4	78	1,352,705
(United States) Dustin Johnson*	30	17	Win	42	1,789,859
(Sweden) Richard S. Johnson	21	9	Win	118	884,367
(Paraguay) Carlos Franco	25	12	T14	170	378,769
(United States) Jim McGovern	26	11	T39	214	136,088
(United States) Tommy Gainey*	24	6	2	148	562, 205
(United States) John Merrick	28	22	T3	83	1,312,005
(United States) Bob Sowards*	22	9	T9	188	263,327
(Spain) Alejandro Cañizares*	16	10	T28	206	162,115
(Australia) David Lutterus*	23	7	T24	215	129,886

*PGA Tour rookie in 2008
T = Tied
Green background indicates the player retained his PGA Tour card for 2009 (finished inside the top 125).
Yellow background indicates the player did not retain his PGA Tour card for 2009, but retained conditional status (finished between 126-150).
Red background indicates the player did not retain his PGA Tour card for 2009 (finished outside the top 150).

== Winners on the PGA Tour in 2008 ==
No.	Date	Player	Tournament	Winning score	Margin of victory	Runner(s)-up
1	Jul 20	(Sweden) Richard S. Johnson	U.S. Bank Championship in Milwaukee	−16 (63-67-70-64=264)	1 stroke	(United States) Ken Duke
2	Aug 3	(United States) Parker McLachlin	Reno-Tahoe Open	−18 (68-62-66-74=270)	7 strokes	(England) Brian Davis, (United States) John Rollins
3	Oct 5	(United States) Dustin Johnson	Turning Stone Resort Championship	−9 (72-68-70-69=279)	1 stroke	(Australia) Robert Allenby

== Runners-up on the PGA Tour in 2008 ==
No.	Date	Player	Tournament	Winner	Winning score	Runner-up score
1	Jul 13	(United States) Brad Adamonis; Lost in three-man playoff	John Deere Classic	(United States) Kenny Perry	−16 (65-66-67-70=268)	−16 (66-66-66-70=268)
2	Oct 12	(New Zealand) Tim Wilkinson	Valero Texas Open	(United States) Zach Johnson	−19 (69-66-62-64=261)	−17 (67-69-63-64=263)
3	Nov 9	(United States) Tommy Gainey	Children's Miracle Network Classic	(United States) Davis Love III	−25 (66-69-64-64=263)	−24 (68-66-66-64=264)

== See also ==
- 2007 Nationwide Tour graduates
