= Ron Whittaker =

American golfer

Personal information
- Full name: Ronald Whittaker
- Nationality: United States
- Born: August 12, 1971 (age 55) Raleigh, North Carolina, U.S.
- Height: 5 ft 11 in (1.80 m)
- Weight: 175 lb (79 kg; 12.5 st)

Career
- Sport: Golf
- College: Wake Forest University
- Turned professional: 1995
- Current tour: Nationwide Tour
- Former tours: Sunshine Tour; PGA Tour
- Professional wins: 2

Number of wins by tour
- Sunshine Tour: 1
- Korn Ferry Tour: 1

Ronald Whittaker (born August 12, 1971) is an American professional golfer.

== Early life ==
Whittaker was born in Raleigh, North Carolina. He was a semi-finalist in the 1988 U.S. Junior Amateur. He played college golf at Wake Forest University where he won once.

== Professional career ==
In 1995, Whittaker turned professional. He played on the Sunshine Tour in 1995, winning the FNB Players Championship and finishing 11th on the Order of Merit. He played on the PGA Tour and Nationwide Tour from 1996 to 1998 and again from 2006 to 2012. On the PGA Tour (1996, 2006, 2008), his best finish was T-9 at the 2006 Frys.com Open. On the Nationwide Tour (1997–98, 2007, 2009–12), he won the 2007 Chattanooga Classic. He played on mini-tours, including the Gateway Tour and Tight Lies Tour between his stints on the PGA/Nationwide Tours, winning several events.

== Personal life ==
Whittaker is the nephew of PGA Tour golfer Lanny Wadkins.

== Professional wins (2) ==
=== Southern Africa Tour wins (1) ===
No.	Date	Tournament	Winning score	Margin of victory	Runners-up
1	Jan 15, 1995	FNB Players Championship	−18 (68-64-68-70=270)	6 strokes	(Zimbabwe) Tony Johnstone, (Republic of Ireland) John McHenry

=== Nationwide Tour wins (1) ===
No.	Date	Tournament	Winning score	Margin of victory	Runner-up
1	Oct 21, 2007	Chattanooga Classic	−17 (66-67-68-70=271)	1 stroke	(Australia) David McKenzie

Nationwide Tour playoff record (0–1)

No.	Year	Tournament	Opponents	Result
1	2007	WNB Golf Classic	(United States) Brad Adamonis, (South Africa) Tjaart van der Walt, (United States) Vance Veazey	Adamonis won with par on eighth extra hole Veazey eliminated by par on second hole Whittaker eliminated by par on first hole

== See also ==
- 1995 PGA Tour Qualifying School graduates
- 2005 PGA Tour Qualifying School graduates
- 2007 Nationwide Tour graduates
