= 1995 PGA Tour Qualifying School graduates =

This is a list of the 43 players who earned 1996 PGA Tour cards through the PGA Tour Qualifying Tournament in 1995.

Place	Player	PGA Tour starts	Cuts made	Notes
1	(United States) Carl Paulson	21	10	
T2	(United States) Omar Uresti	32	16	1 Nike Tour win
T2	(United States) Steve Hart	161	53	
T4	(United States) Joey Gullion	1	0	
T4	(United States) Shane Bertsch	1	1	
T4	(United States) Tom Byrum	280	151	1 PGA Tour win
T4	(United States) Olin Browne	69	30	3 Nike Tour wins
T4	(United States) Kevin Sutherland	2	1	
T9	(United States) Russ Cochran	377	237	1 PGA Tour win
T9	(United States) Tim Herron	1	0	
12	(United States) Steve Jurgensen	3	1	1 Nike Tour win
T13	(United States) David Peoples	340	186	2 PGA Tour wins
T13	(United States) Scott Medlin	2	0	
T13	(United States) Clarence Rose	345	184	1 Nike Tour win
T16	(Australia) Lucas Parsons	0	0	3 PGA Tour of Australasia wins
T16	(Japan) Hisayuki Sasaki	2	0	2 Japan Golf Tour wins
T16	(United States) Brian Tennyson	152	83	
T16	(United States) Robert Wrenn	282	157	1 PGA Tour win
T16	(United States) Paul Stankowski	60	25	
T21	(Australia) Steve Rintoul	62	32	
T21	(United States) Billy Ray Brown	208	114	2 PGA Tour wins
T21	(United States) Frank Lickliter	1	0	1 Nike Tour win
T21	(United States) Ronnie Black	387	239	2 PGA Tour wins
T21	(United States) Jeff Gallagher	2	0	1 Nike Tour win
T21	(United States) Len Mattiace	28	13	
T27	(United States) Bart Bryant	82	41	
T27	(United States) Scott Dunlap	3	2	
T27	(United States) Joe Daley	2	1	
T30	(United States) Jay Williamson	22	11	
T30	(United States) John Maginnes	2	1	1 Nike Tour win
T30	(United States) Taylor Smith	3	2	1 Nike Tour win
T30	(United States) Jeff Julian	3	0	
T30	(United States) Greg Kraft	119	52	
T30	(United States) Mike Swartz	7	1	
T30	(Sweden) Jarmo Sandelin	1	1	1 European Tour win
T30	(United States) Joel Edwards	203	86	
T38	(United States) John Elliott	54	21	1 Nike Tour win
T38	(United States) Andy Bean	480	311	11 PGA Tour wins
T38	(United States) Bryan Gorman	2	0	
T38	(United States) Jeff Hart	78	36	
T38	(United States) Ron Whittaker	4	1	
T38	(United States) Gary Rusnak	5	2	

PGA Tour rookie in 1996

== 1996 Results ==
Player	Starts	Cuts made	Best finish	Money list rank	Earnings ($)
(United States) Carl Paulson	30	14	T12	155	116,071
(United States) Omar Uresti	32	15	T7	122	171,797
(United States) Steve Hart	1	1	77	364	2,325
(United States) Joey Gullion*	30	13	T5	163	99,849
(United States) Shane Bertsch*	28	8	T5	188	65,517
(United States) Tom Byrum	26	12	T3	126	166,500
(United States) Olin Browne	27	21	T7	94	223,703
(United States) Kevin Sutherland*	33	21	T9	135	144,828
(United States) Russ Cochran	28	14	2	62	330,183
(United States) Tim Herron*	31	22	Win	39	475,670
(United States) Steve Jurgensen*	31	15	T10	152	118,049
(United States) David Peoples	22	7	T25	215	32,385
(United States) Scott Medlin*	23	5	T26	236	23,277
(United States) Clarence Rose	27	17	Win	41	461,899
(Australia) Lucas Parsons*	24	4	T35	240	21,233
(Japan) Hisayuki Sasaki*	19	13	T11	159	105,651
(United States) Brian Tennyson	22	15	T9	166	96,329
(United States) Robert Wrenn	25	12	T12	176	81,690
(United States) Paul Stankowski	25	11	Win	52	390,575
(Australia) Steve Rintoul	27	10	T35	213	33,965
(United States) Billy Ray Brown	26	15	T22	185	67,203
(United States) Frank Lickliter*	29	15	T7	138	138,847
(United States) Ronnie Black	26	20	T5	91	247,320
(United States) Jeff Gallagher*	31	11	T10	157	114,001
(United States) Len Mattiace	30	15	T2	92	238,977
(United States) Bart Bryant	26	14	T18	172	88,788
(United States) Scott Dunlap*	28	13	T3	124	168,682
(United States) Joe Daley*	27	13	T6	167	96,287
(United States) Jay Williamson	27	13	T7	175	82,773
(United States) John Maginnes*	28	14	T2	113	184,065
(United States) Taylor Smith*	27	16	T2	102	221,517
(United States) Jeff Julian*	26	17	T16	193	55,602
(United States) Greg Kraft	27	15	T3	61	331,708
(United States) Mike Swartz*	29	8	T7	181	77,616
(Sweden) Jarmo Sandelin*	14	1	T72	360	2,509
(United States) Joel Edwards	27	20	T4	90	248,450
(United States) John Elliott	22	5	T14	226	26,926
(United States) Andy Bean	28	10	8	177	80,849
(United States) Bryan Gorman*	24	11	T28	200	47,713
(United States) Jeff Hart	23	11	T20	186	66,450
(United States) Ron Whittaker*	23	8	T33	224	29,656
(United States) Gary Rusnak*	26	14	T20	183	74,209

*PGA Tour rookie in 1996
T = Tied
The player retained his PGA Tour card for 1997 (finished inside the top 125)
The player did not retain his PGA Tour card for 1997, but retained conditional status (finished between 126-150)
The player did not retain his PGA Tour card for 1997 (finished outside the top 150)

== Winners on the PGA Tour in 1996 ==
No.	Date	Player	Tournament	Winning score	Margin of victory	Runner-up
1	Mar 10	(United States) Tim Herron	Honda Classic	−17 (62-68-72-69=271)	4 strokes	(United States) Mark McCumber
2	Apr 7	(United States) Paul Stankowski	BellSouth Classic	−8 (68-71-70-71=280)	Playoff	(United States) Brandel Chamblee
3	Aug 18	(United States) Clarence Rose	Sprint International	31 points (6-3-12-10)	Playoff	(United States) Brad Faxon

== Runners-up on the PGA Tour in 1996 ==
No.	Date	Player	Tournament	Winner	Winning score	Runner-up score
1	Jul 28	(United States) Russ Cochran	CVS Charity Classic	(United States) John Cook	−16 (65-67-67-69=268)	−13 (68-64-71-68=271)
2	Aug 25	(United States) Taylor Smith	Greater Vancouver Open	(United States) Guy Boros	−15 (71-65-65-71=272)	−14 (71-65-65-72=273)
3–4	Sep 29	(United States) John Maginnes; Lost in five-man playoff	Buick Challenge	(United States) Michael Bradley	−10 (66-68=134)	−10 (68-66=134)
3–4	Sep 29	(United States) Len Mattiace; Lost in five-man playoff	Buick Challenge	(United States) Michael Bradley	−10 (66-68=134)	−10 (66-68=134)

== See also ==
- 1995 Nike Tour graduates
