= 2007 Nationwide Tour graduates =

This is a list of players who graduated from the Nationwide Tour in 2007. The top 25 players on the Nationwide Tour's money list in 2007 earned their PGA Tour card for 2008.

	2007 Nationwide Tour		2008 PGA Tour				
Player	Money list rank	Earnings ($)	Starts	Cuts made	Best finish	Money list rank	Earnings ($)
(Wales) Richard Johnson*	1	445,421	29	9	T27	198	200,210
(United States) Roland Thatcher	2	415,124	15	7	T7	161	445,212
(Australia) Nick Flanagan*#	3	369,951	29	16	T9	169	379,036
(Canada) Jon Mills	4	366,244	32	16	T13	154	489,510
(Australia) Jason Day*	5	331,542	28	13	6	136	767,393
(United States) Nicholas Thompson	6	328,331	36	21	T2	41	1,869,329
(Australia) Matt Jones*	7	302,227	31	17	T4 (twice)	135	775,899
(United States) Justin Bolli	8	293,834	28	16	T5	158	458,022
(United States) Patrick Sheehan	9	281,523	35	27	6/T6	128	805,897
(United States) Paul Claxton	10	274,004	23	8	T21	218	116,678
(United States) Ron Whittaker	11	271,950	22	5	T36	231	59,977
(United States) Michael Letzig*	12	263,948	29	15	T2	93	1,166,977
(Scotland) Martin Laird*	13	252,679	29	20	T4 (twice)	125	852,752
(United States) Kyle Thompson*	14	248,698	26	9	T15	211	154,447
(United States) Omar Uresti	15	247,355	24	13	T11	173	346,285
(United States) Marc Turnesa*	16	237,890	29	13	Win	81	1,329,920
(United States) Brad Elder	17	231,586	23	9	T8	186	270,365
(United States) Chez Reavie*	18	224,532	30	21	Win	71	1,444,102
(United States) John Riegger	19	221,184	24	13	T18	181	289,501
(United States) Tom Scherrer	20	220,138	20	8	T7	183	288,391
(United States) Scott Sterling*	21	216,323	28	17	T6	144	624,822
(South Africa) Brenden Pappas	22	212,452	24	9	9	168	384,072
(United States) Chad Collins*	23	209,876	24	12	T11	174	339,959
(United States) James Driscoll	24	208,139	28	15	T5	141	708,549
(United States) Jimmy Walker	25	196,896	24	13	T19 (twice)	185	282,249

*PGA Tour rookie for 2008.
#Flanagan received a battlefield promotion to the PGA Tour in 2007 by winning three tournaments on the Nationwide Tour in 2007. On the PGA Tour in 2007, he played in 4 tournaments and made 2 cuts. In the two tournaments that he made the cut in, he finished in a tie for 17th and in a tie for 18th.
T = Tied
Green background indicates the player retained his PGA Tour card for 2009 (won or finished inside the top 125).
Yellow background indicates the player did not retain his PGA Tour card for 2009, but retained conditional status (finished between 126–150).
Red background indicates the player did not retain his PGA Tour card for 2009 (finished outside the top 150).

== Winners on the PGA Tour in 2008 ==
No.	Date	Player	Tournament	Winning score	Margin of victory	Runner-up
1	Jul 27	(United States) Chez Reavie	RBC Canadian Open	−17 (65-64-68-70=267)	3 strokes	(United States) Billy Mayfair
2	Oct 18	(United States) Marc Turnesa	Justin Timberlake Shriners Hospitals for Children Open	−25 (62-64-69-68=263)	1 stroke	(United States) Matt Kuchar

== Runners-up on the PGA Tour in 2008 ==
No.	Date	Player	Tournament	Winner	Winning score	Runner-up score
1	Sep 21	(United States) Marc Turnesa; Lost in three-man playoff	Viking Classic	(United States) Will MacKenzie	−19 (70-64-67-68=269)	−19 (65-68-66-70=269)
2	Nov 2	(United States) Michael Letzig	Ginn sur Mer Classic	(United States) Ryan Palmer	−7 (67-71-72-71=281)	−6 (65-74-70-73=282)
3	Nov 2	(United States) Nicholas Thompson	Ginn sur Mer Classic	(United States) Ryan Palmer	−7 (67-71-72-71=281)	−6 (71-70-72-69=282)

== See also ==
- 2007 PGA Tour Qualifying School graduates
