= Tjaart van der Walt =

South African professional golfer (born 1974)

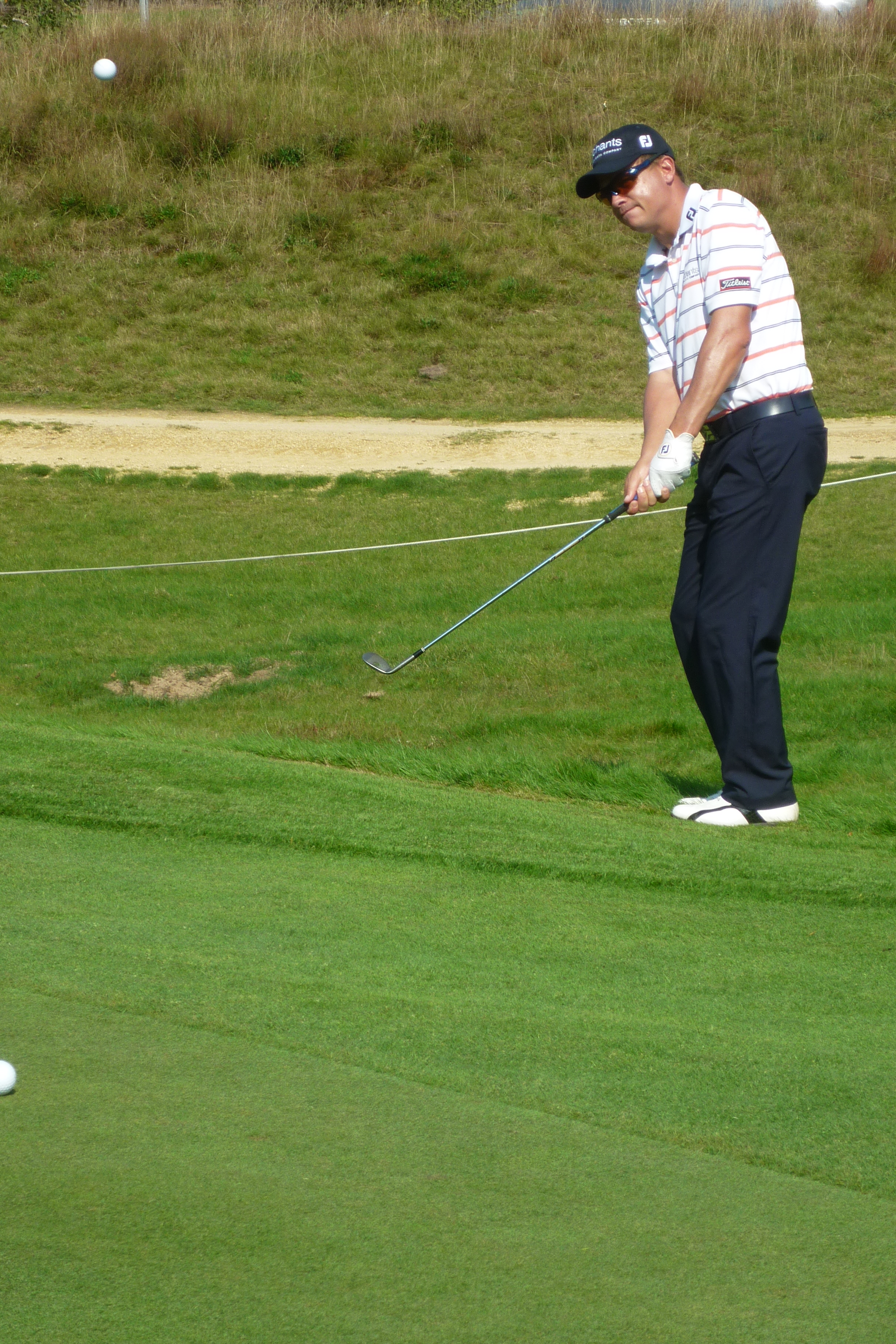

Personal information
- Nationality: South Africa
- Born: 25 September 1974 (age 52) Pretoria, South Africa
- Height: 1.85 m (6 ft 1 in)
- Weight: 87 kg (192 lb; 13.7 st)
- Spouse: Victoria

Career
- Sport: Golf
- College: Central Alabama Community College
- Turned professional: 1996
- Former tours: PGA Tour; European Tour; Asian Tour; Sunshine Tour; Nationwide Tour; Golden Bear Tour
- Professional wins: 1

Number of wins by tour
- Sunshine Tour: 1

Best results in major championships
- Masters Tournament: DNP
- PGA Championship: DNP
- U.S. Open: CUT: 2015
- The Open Championship: T36: 2004

Achievements and awards
- Asian Tour Rookie of the Year: 2011

Tjaart van der Walt (born 25 September 1974) is a South African professional golfer.

== Amateur career ==
Like many top golfers, van der Walt received a golf scholarship to study in the United States. He attended Central Alabama Community College.

== Professional career ==
In 1996, van der Walt turned professional. He immediately joined his home tour in South Africa, the Sunshine Tour. He finished 45th in the Order of Merit in his first season as a professional, and improved to 7th the following year. In 1999, van der Walt attempted to qualify for the PGA Tour, and was successful enough to earn a place on the Nationwide Tour for 2000, prompting him to return to the U.S. He played successfully on that tour until 2003, recording runner-up finishes in his first two years, and choosing not to take up a place on the European Tour he had won for 2001 at the qualifying school, in preference for another Nationwide season.

In 2003, van der Walt successfully came through the PGA Tour qualifying school and secured himself a PGA Tour place for 2004. He spent the following three seasons at the level, with his best result coming in 2005 when he lost a playoff to Brad Faxon for the Buick Championship. In 2007, van der Walt returned to the Nationwide Tour, recording another runner-up finish. He was a Nationwide regular until losing his place on that tour at the end of 2010.

For 2011, van der Walt qualified for the first time for the Asian Tour. In his first season on that tour he compiled five top-10 finishes in ten events, including a runner-up at the ISPS Handa Singapore Classic, and finished 17th on the Order of Merit. At the end of the season he was named Asian Tour Rookie of the Year.

After his 2011 season, van der Walt entered qualifying school for the European Tour once more. Eleven years after previously earning his card at the school, he was once again successful in ensuring a place on the tour for 2012.

In the season opening event of the 2012 European Tour, van der Walt finished runner-up in the Africa Open to compatriot Louis Oosthuizen by two strokes.

Van der Walt has maintained a commitment to his home Sunshine Tour. Since his debut season in 1996–97 he has never played fewer than five tournaments a year on the tour, and has never finished lower than 70th on the Order of Merit.

Van der Walt has recorded an array of runners-up finishes across the globe, including the Sunshine Tour, Nationwide Tour, PGA Tour, European Tour and Asian Tour, but was never able to win a professional event until 2013. Van der Walt won the 2013 Lion of Africa Cape Town Open on the Sunshine Tour, seventeen years after turning pro.

In 2017, Van der Walt co-founded AnchorUp Sports – an exclusive talent management agency working with a select group of the world's top golfers. He currently holds the position of managing director at the company.

== Professional wins (1) ==
=== Sunshine Tour wins (1) ===
| No. | Date | Tournament | Winning score | Margin of victory | Runner-up |
|---|---|---|---|---|---|
| 1 | 3 Nov 2013 | Lion of Africa Cape Town Open | −14 (69-69-65-71=274) | 6 strokes | (South Africa) Michael Hollick |

== Playoff record ==
PGA Tour playoff record (0–1)

| No. | Year | Tournament | Opponent | Result |
|---|---|---|---|---|
| 1 | 2005 | Buick Championship | (United States) Brad Faxon | Lost to birdie on first extra hole |

European Tour playoff record (0–1)

| No. | Year | Tournament | Opponent | Result |
|---|---|---|---|---|
| 1 | 2013 | Najeti Hotels et Golfs Open | (Republic of Ireland) Simon Thornton | Lost to par on first extra hole |

Asian Tour playoff record (0–1)

| No. | Year | Tournament | Opponents | Result |
|---|---|---|---|---|
| 1 | 2011 | ISPS Handa Singapore Classic | (Brazil) Adilson da Silva, (India) Himmat Rai, (Philippines) Elmer Salvador, (Netherlands) Guido van der Valk | Rai won with birdie on sixth extra hole da Silva, van der Valk and van der Walt eliminated by birdie on second hole |

Nationwide Tour playoff record (0–1)

| No. | Year | Tournament | Opponents | Result |
|---|---|---|---|---|
| 1 | 2007 | WNB Golf Classic | (United States) Brad Adamonis, (United States) Vance Veazey, (United States) Ron Whittaker | Adamonis won with par on eighth extra hole Veazey eliminated by par on second hole Whittaker eliminated by par on first hole |

== Results in major championships ==
| Tournament | 2004 | 2005 | 2006 | 2007 | 2008 | 2009 | 2010 | 2011 | 2012 | 2013 | 2014 | 2015 |
|---|---|---|---|---|---|---|---|---|---|---|---|---|
| U.S. Open | | | | | | | | | | | | CUT |
| The Open Championship | T36 | | | | | | | | | | | |

Note: van der Walt never played in the Masters Tournament or the PGA Championship.

Did not play

CUT = missed the half-way cut
"T" = tied

== Results in World Golf Championships ==
| Tournament | 2000 |
|---|---|
| Match Play | |
| Championship | T50 |
| Invitational | |

Did not play

"T" = Tied

== See also ==
- 2003 PGA Tour Qualifying School graduates
- 2011 European Tour Qualifying School graduates
