= Frank Lickliter =

American professional golfer (born 1969)

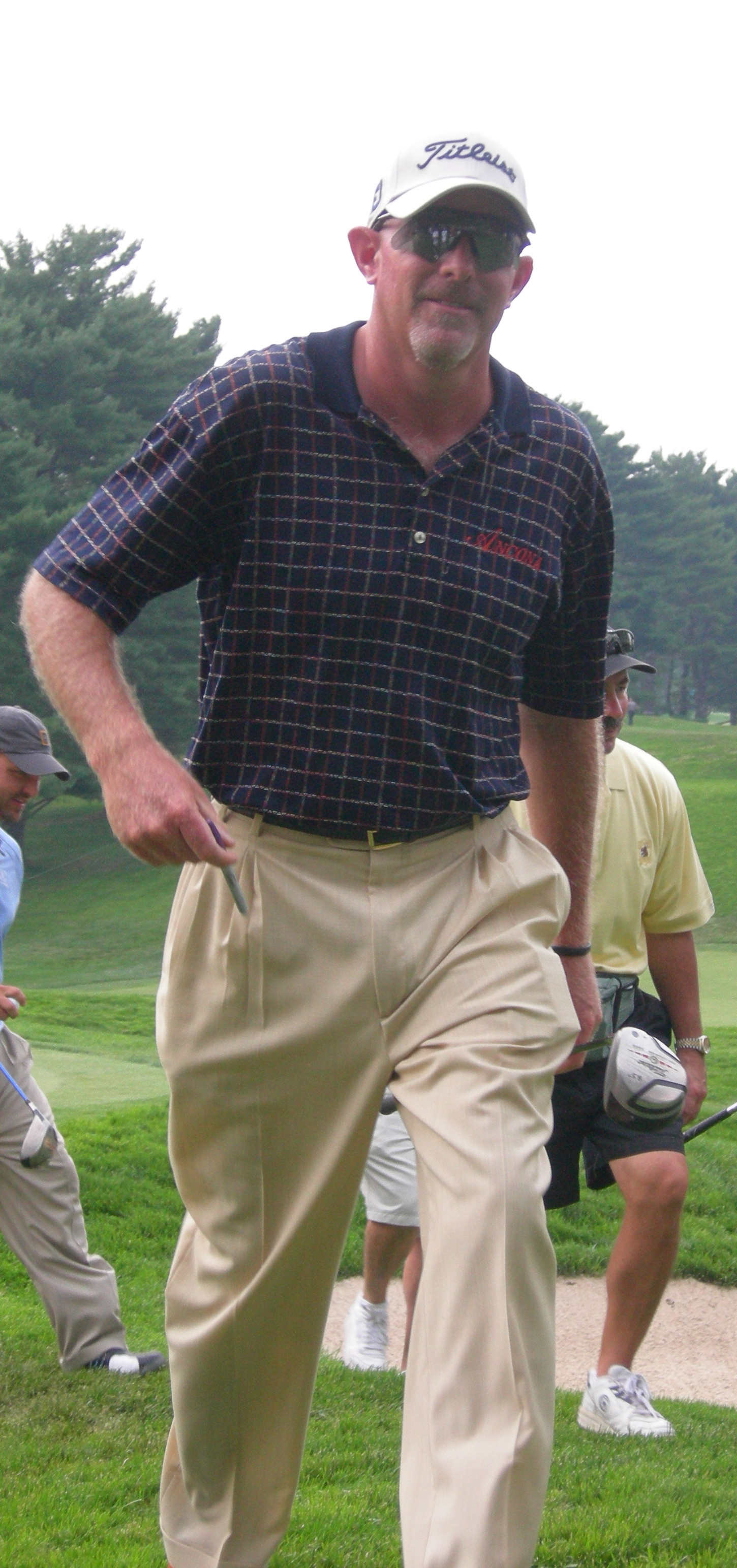

Personal information
- Full name: Franklin Ray Lickliter II
- Nationality: United States
- Born: July 28, 1969 (age 57) Middletown, Ohio, U.S.
- Height: 6 ft 1 in (1.85 m)
- Weight: 185 lb (84 kg; 13.2 st)

Career
- Sport: Golf
- College: Wright State University
- Turned professional: 1991
- Current tour: PGA Tour Champions
- Former tours: Web.com Tour; PGA Tour
- Professional wins: 3
- Highest ranking: 41 (September 2, 2001)

Number of wins by tour
- PGA Tour: 2
- Korn Ferry Tour: 1

Best results in major championships
- Masters Tournament: CUT: 1999
- PGA Championship: T4: 1998
- U.S. Open: T18: 1998
- The Open Championship: T37: 2001

Franklin Ray Lickliter II (born July 28, 1969) is an American professional golfer. He featured in the top 50 of the Official World Golf Ranking, going as high as 41st in 2001.

== Early life ==
In 1969, Lickliter was born in Middletown, Ohio, adjacent to his hometown of Franklin, Ohio. Lickliter is a 1987 graduate of Franklin High School and a 1991 graduate of nearby Wright State University.

== Professional career ==
In 1991, Lickliter turned professional. He first joined the Nike Tour where he earned a win in 1995. He joined the PGA Tour in 1996 and won events in 2001 and 2003. His best finish in a major is T-4 at the 1998 PGA Championship.

In 2007, he finished 139th on the PGA Tour money list which was not good enough to retain his card for 2008. He earned his card for 2008 by being medalist at the 2007 PGA Tour Qualifying Tournament. Lickliter was not fully exempt on the PGA Tour after 2009.

== Professional wins (3) ==
=== PGA Tour wins (2) ===
| No. | Date | Tournament | Winning score | Margin of victory | Runner-up |
|---|---|---|---|---|---|
| 1 | May 27, 2001 | Kemper Insurance Open | −20 (69-65-66-68=268) | 1 stroke | (United States) J. J. Henry |
| 2 | Mar 2, 2003 | Chrysler Classic of Tucson | −19 (67-63-70-69=269) | 2 strokes | (United States) Chad Campbell |

PGA Tour playoff record (0–1)

| No. | Year | Tournament | Opponents | Result |
|---|---|---|---|---|
| 1 | 2001 | Buick Invitational | (United States) Davis Love III, (United States) Phil Mickelson | Mickelson won with double-bogey on third extra hole Love eliminated by par on second hole |

=== Nike Tour wins (1) ===
| No. | Date | Tournament | Winning score | Margin of victory | Runners-up |
|---|---|---|---|---|---|
| 1 | Sep 24, 1995 | Nike Boise Open | −13 (66-66-68=200) | 1 stroke | (United States) Kevin Burton, (United States) Craig Kanada |

== Results in major championships ==
| Tournament | 1994 | 1995 | 1996 | 1997 | 1998 | 1999 |
|---|---|---|---|---|---|---|
| Masters Tournament | | | | | | CUT |
| U.S. Open | CUT | | T67 | CUT | T18 | |
| The Open Championship | | | | | | |
| PGA Championship | | | | | T4 | CUT |

| Tournament | 2000 | 2001 | 2002 | 2003 | 2004 | 2005 | 2006 | 2007 |
|---|---|---|---|---|---|---|---|---|
| Masters Tournament | | | WD | | | | | |
| U.S. Open | CUT | T52 | T50 | | | T57 | | |
| The Open Championship | | T37 | CUT | | CUT | | | |
| PGA Championship | | T51 | CUT | T29 | WD | | | T50 |

Top 10
Did not play

CUT = missed the half-way cut
WD = withdrew
"T" = tied

=== Summary ===
| Tournament | Wins | 2nd | 3rd | Top-5 | Top-10 | Top-25 | Events | Cuts made |
|---|---|---|---|---|---|---|---|---|
| Masters Tournament | 0 | 0 | 0 | 0 | 0 | 0 | 2 | 0 |
| U.S. Open | 0 | 0 | 0 | 0 | 0 | 1 | 8 | 5 |
| The Open Championship | 0 | 0 | 0 | 0 | 0 | 0 | 3 | 1 |
| PGA Championship | 0 | 0 | 0 | 1 | 1 | 1 | 7 | 4 |
| Totals | 0 | 0 | 0 | 1 | 1 | 2 | 20 | 10 |

- Most consecutive cuts made – 3 (2001 U.S. Open – 2002 U.S. Open)
- Longest streak of top-10s – 1

== Results in The Players Championship ==
| Tournament | 1998 | 1999 | 2000 | 2001 | 2002 | 2003 | 2004 | 2005 | 2006 | 2007 |
|---|---|---|---|---|---|---|---|---|---|---|
| The Players Championship | CUT | T23 | T48 | T7 | T49 | CUT | T3 | T79 | | T37 |

Top 10
Did not play

CUT = missed the halfway cut
"T" indicates a tie for a place

== Results in World Golf Championships ==
| Tournament | 2002 |
|---|---|
| Match Play | R64 |
| Championship | |
| Invitational | |

Did not play

QF, R16, R32, R64 = Round in which player lost in match play

== Results in senior major championships ==
| Tournament | 2020 | 2021 | 2022 |
|---|---|---|---|
| The Tradition | NT | T76 | |
| Senior PGA Championship | NT | 76 | |
| U.S. Senior Open | NT | | |
| Senior Players Championship | 72 | | 78 |
| Senior British Open Championship | NT | T68 | |

"T" indicates a tie for a place
NT = No tournament due to COVID-19 pandemic

== See also ==
- 1995 PGA Tour Qualifying School graduates
- 1996 PGA Tour Qualifying School graduates
- 2005 PGA Tour Qualifying School graduates
- 2007 PGA Tour Qualifying School graduates
