= Parker McLachlin =

American golfer

Personal information
- Full name: Parker Nicholas McLachlin
- Nickname: The Short Game Chef
- Nationality: United States
- Born: May 10, 1979 (age 47) Honolulu, Hawaii, U.S.
- Height: 6 ft 1 in (1.85 m)
- Weight: 165 lb (75 kg; 11.8 st)

Career
- Sport: Golf
- College: University of California, Los Angeles
- Turned professional: 2003
- Former tours: PGA Tour; Korn Ferry Tour; NGA Hooters Tour; Gateway Tour
- Professional wins: 3

Number of wins by tour
- PGA Tour: 1
- Other: 2

Best results in major championships
- Masters Tournament: DNP
- PGA Championship: CUT: 2008
- U.S. Open: CUT: 2004
- The Open Championship: DNP

Parker Nicholas McLachlin (born May 10, 1979) is an American professional golfer. He is also a golf instructor and plays on the PGA Tour.

== Career ==
McLachlin was born in Honolulu, Hawaii. He graduated from Punahou School in 1997 and UCLA in 2002 with a degree in sociology.

In 2003, McLachlin turned professional and played on mini-tours until 2006 when he played the Nationwide Tour. He played on the PGA Tour in both 2007 and 2008 after successfully completing qualifying school each year. In 2008, he won his first PGA Tour event, the Legends Reno-Tahoe Open, and secured his tour card through 2010. McLachlin has not played full-time since 2010.

== Personal life ==
McLachlin's mother Beth competed on Team USA's National Women's Volleyball Team.

== Professional wins (3) ==
=== PGA Tour wins (1) ===
No.	Date	Tournament	Winning score	Margin of victory	Runners-up
1	Aug 3, 2008	Legends Reno–Tahoe Open	−18 (68-62-66-74=270)	7 strokes	(England) Brian Davis, (United States) John Rollins

=== NGA Hooters Tour wins (1) ===
No.	Date	Tournament	Winning score	Margin of victory	Runner-up
1	Apr 18, 2004	Golden Corner Charity Classic	−13 (70-66-69-66=271)	2 strokes	(United States) Michael Letzig

=== Gateway Tour wins (1) ===
No.	Date	Tournament	Winning score	Margin of victory	Runner-up
1	Aug 19, 2005	Desert Summer 10	−22 (66-69-64-66=265)	1 stroke	(United States) Scott Harrington

== Results in major championships ==
Tournament	2004	2005	2006	2007	2008
U.S. Open	CUT				
PGA Championship					CUT

Did not play

CUT = missed the halfway cut
Note: McLachlin never played in the Masters Tournament or The Open Championship.

== See also ==
- 2006 PGA Tour Qualifying School graduates
- 2007 PGA Tour Qualifying School graduates
