= Brad Adamonis =

American professional golfer (born 1973)

Personal information
- Full name: Bradley Fred Adamonis
- Nationality: United States
- Born: January 16, 1973 (age 53) Providence, Rhode Island, U.S.
- Height: 6 ft 2 in (1.88 m)
- Weight: 215 lb (98 kg; 15.4 st)

Career
- Sport: Golf
- College: Miami University
- Turned professional: 1996
- Former tours: PGA Tour; Web.com Tour; NGA Hooters Tour
- Professional wins: 1

Number of wins by tour
- Korn Ferry Tour: 1

Best results in major championships
- Masters Tournament: DNP
- PGA Championship: DNP
- U.S. Open: CUT: 2011
- The Open Championship: DNP

Bradley Fred Adamonis (born January 16, 1973) is an American professional golfer who has played on the PGA Tour.

== Early life and amateur career ==
Adamonis' grandparents are of Lithuanian descent. He was born in Providence, Rhode Island and graduated from Miami University in Oxford, Ohio in 1996 with a degree in Sports Management. While at Miami, he was first-team All-Mid-American Conference in his senior year. He also won the 1994 New England Invitational while at Miami.

== Professional career ==
In 1995, Adamonis turned professional. He played on the Nationwide Tour from 2002 to 2004, 2006 and 2007 and the NGA Hooters Tour in 2003 and 2005. He earned his 2008 PGA Tour card by placing in the top 25 of qualifying school. He won his first professional tournament on the Nationwide Tour in 2007 at the WNB Golf Classic.

In his rookie season on the PGA Tour, Adamonis finished just high enough on the money list to retain his tour card for 2009. He finished in 124th with $862,413. He also recorded three top-10 finishes including a runner-up finish at the John Deere Classic. Adamonis went into a three-way playoff with Kenny Perry and Jay Williamson. Perry won the tournament on the first playoff hole.

Adamonis played in his first major at the 2011 U.S. Open. He missed a qualifying spot by one stroke, but was a first alternate. He was the 156th and final entry added to the event at Congressional Country Club. He did not make the cut.

== Professional wins (1) ==
=== Nationwide Tour wins (1) ===
No.	Date	Tournament	Winning score	Margin of victory	Runners-up
1	Oct 14, 2007	WNB Golf Classic	−10 (68-68-72-70=278)	Playoff	(South Africa) Tjaart van der Walt, (United States) Vance Veazey, (United States) Ron Whittaker

Nationwide Tour playoff record (1–0)

No.	Year	Tournament	Opponents	Result
1	2007	WNB Golf Classic	(South Africa) Tjaart van der Walt, (United States) Vance Veazey, (United States) Ron Whittaker	Won with par on eighth extra hole Veazey eliminated by par on second hole Whittaker eliminated by par on first hole

== Playoff record ==
PGA Tour playoff record (0–1)

No.	Year	Tournament	Opponents	Result
1	2008	John Deere Classic	(United States) Kenny Perry, (United States) Jay Williamson	Perry won with par on first extra hole

== Results in major championships ==
Tournament	2011
U.S. Open	CUT

CUT = missed the half-way cut
Note: Adamonis only played in the U.S. Open.

== See also ==
- 2007 PGA Tour Qualifying School graduates
