= Tim Herron =

American professional golfer (born 1970)

Personal information
- Full name: Timothy Daniel Herron
- Nickname: Lumpy
- Nationality: United States
- Born: February 6, 1970 (age 56) Minneapolis, Minnesota, U.S.
- Height: 5 ft 10 in (1.78 m)
- Weight: 250 lb (110 kg; 18 st)

Career
- Sport: Golf
- College: University of New Mexico
- Turned professional: 1993
- Current tour: PGA Tour Champions
- Former tours: PGA Tour; Web.com Tour
- Professional wins: 4
- Highest ranking: 29 (February 6, 2000)

Number of wins by tour
- PGA Tour: 4

Best results in major championships
- Masters Tournament: T11: 2005
- PGA Championship: T13: 1997
- U.S. Open: 6th: 1999
- The Open Championship: T30: 1999

Timothy Daniel Herron (born February 6, 1970) is an American professional golfer. He currently plays on the PGA Tour Champions. He was previously a member of the PGA Tour, where he was a four-time winner.

== Early life ==
Herron was born in Minneapolis, Minnesota. His father and grandfather, both named Carson Herron, were professional golfers who played in the U.S. Open.

== Amateur career ==
Herron was a 1992-1993 first team All-American at the University of New Mexico. He won the 1992 Minnesota State Amateur. Herron played on the 1993 Walker Cup team.

== Professional career ==
In 1993, Herron turned professional. He played on the Nationwide Tour in 1995, and the following season he won for the first time on the PGA Tour at the Honda Classic. He won three times in his first four seasons at the top level. Herron continued to play consistently after that, but there was a seven-year gap before he claimed his fourth PGA Tour title at the 2006 Bank of America Colonial. His best finish in a major championship is a solo 6th-place finish in the 1999 U.S. Open. In 2000, Herron was as high as 29th in the Official World Golf Rankings.

Herron has played in 560 PGA Tour events through 2019 and won more than $19.6 million during his career, but has not been fully exempt on the PGA Tour since 2012.

== Personal life ==
Herron resides in Wayzata, Minnesota with his three children: Carson, Mick, and Patrick. Carson, who also attended the University of New Mexico and turned professional in 2025, qualified for the 2025 John Deere Classic after surviving a 3-for-1 playoff.

Herron has a genetic condition called Dupuytren's contracture which also affected his father and sister. Herron's younger sister Alissa (married name Super) is also an accomplished golfer; she won the 1999 U.S. Women's Mid-Amateur title, won several Minnesota state titles, is a member of the Minnesota Golf Hall of Fame, and has served as her brother's agent.

== Amateur wins ==
- 1992 Minnesota State Amateur

== Professional wins (4) ==
=== PGA Tour wins (4) ===
No.	Date	Tournament	Winning score	Margin of victory	Runner(s)-up
1	Mar 12, 1996	Honda Classic	−17 (66-69-66-68=271)	3 strokes	(Zimbabwe) Nick Price
2	Sep 21, 1997	LaCantera Texas Open	−17 (71-67-64-69=271)	2 strokes	(United States) Rick Fehr, (United States) Brent Geiberger
3	Mar 21, 1999	Bay Hill Invitational	−14 (66-69-67-72=274)	Playoff	(United States) Tom Lehman
4	May 21, 2006	Bank of America Colonial	−12 (67-65-68-68=268)	Playoff	(Sweden) Richard S. Johnson

PGA Tour playoff record (2–1)

No.	Year	Tournament	Opponent	Result
1	1999	Bay Hill Invitational	(United States) Tom Lehman	Won with birdie on second extra hole
2	2004	Buick Championship	(United States) Woody Austin	Lost to birdie on first extra hole
3	2006	Bank of America Colonial	(Sweden) Richard S. Johnson	Won with birdie on second extra hole

== Playoff record ==
Other playoff record (0–1)

No.	Year	Tournament	Opponents	Result
1	2008	CVS Caremark Charity Classic (with (United States) Paul Goydos)	(United States) Billy Andrade and (United States) Davis Love III, (United States) Rocco Mediate and (United States) Brandt Snedeker, (Colombia) Camilo Villegas and (United States) Bubba Watson	Villegas/Watson won by 1 stroke in three-hole aggregate playoff

== Results in major championships ==
Tournament	1995	1996	1997	1998	1999
Masters Tournament		CUT		CUT	T44
U.S. Open	CUT	CUT		T53	6
The Open Championship		CUT			T30
PGA Championship		T31	T13	75	CUT

Tournament	2000	2001	2002	2003	2004	2005	2006	2007	2008	2009
Masters Tournament	CUT				CUT	T11	T36	T37		
U.S. Open	CUT	T40	T50		T13	T33	63			
The Open Championship	CUT				CUT	T41	CUT			
PGA Championship	CUT	CUT	CUT	T14	CUT	CUT	T14	T66		

Tournament	2010	2011	2012
Masters Tournament			
U.S. Open			CUT
The Open Championship			
PGA Championship			

Top 10
Did not play

CUT = missed the half-way cut
"T" = tied

=== Summary ===
Tournament	Wins	2nd	3rd	Top-5	Top-10	Top-25	Events	Cuts made
Masters Tournament	0	0	0	0	0	1	8	4
U.S. Open	0	0	0	0	1	2	11	7
The Open Championship	0	0	0	0	0	0	6	2
PGA Championship	0	0	0	0	0	3	12	6
Totals	0	0	0	0	1	6	37	19

- Most consecutive cuts made – 5 (1998 U.S. Open – 1999 Open Championship)
- Longest streak of top-10s – 1

== Results in The Players Championship ==
Tournament	1996	1997	1998	1999	2000	2001	2002	2003	2004	2005	2006	2007	2008	2009	2010	2011	2012	2013
The Players Championship	T19	CUT	CUT	CUT	CUT	T21	T28	T54	CUT	T6	CUT	T52	CUT	CUT			CUT	T15

Top 10
Did not play

CUT = missed the halfway cut
"T" indicates a tie for a place

== Results in World Golf Championships ==
Tournament	1999	2000	2001	2002	2003	2004	2005	2006
Match Play		R32	R32			R64	R64	R64
Championship	T16		NT^{1}		T2	T54		T48
Invitational								T68

^{1}Cancelled due to 9/11

Top 10
Did not play

QF, R16, R32, R64 = Round in which player lost in match play
"T" = Tied
NT = No tournament

== Results in senior major championships ==
Tournament	2020	2021	2022	2023	2024	2025	2026
Senior PGA Championship	NT	T40	T20	CUT			T56
The Tradition	NT	T56	T50	T50	T52		
U.S. Senior Open	NT			T23			
Senior Players Championship	T52	T63	T44		T72		
Senior British Open Championship	NT	T35			CUT		

Did not play

CUT = missed the halfway cut
"T" indicates a tie for a place
NT = no tournament due to COVID-19 pandemic

== U.S. national team appearances ==
Amateur

- Walker Cup: 1993 (winners)

== See also ==
- 1995 PGA Tour Qualifying School graduates
