= Justin Bolli =

American professional golfer

Personal information
- Nationality: United States
- Born: March 18, 1976 (age 50) Portland, Oregon, U.S.
- Height: 6 ft 2 in (1.88 m)
- Weight: 205 lb (93 kg; 14.6 st)

Career
- Sport: Golf
- College: University of Georgia
- Turned professional: 1999
- Former tours: PGA Tour; Web.com Tour; NGA Hooters Tour
- Professional wins: 9

Number of wins by tour
- Korn Ferry Tour: 4
- Other: 5

Justin Bolli (born March 18, 1976) is an American professional golfer. who has played on the PGA Tour and the Web.com Tour.

== Early life ==
Bolli was born in Portland, Oregon.

== Professional career ==
Bolli started playing on the Nationwide Tour full-time in 2004 and moved up to the PGA Tour in 2005. In his rookie season on the PGA Tour, he only made 9 of 24 cuts with his best finish being tied for 17th at the Southern Farm Bureau Classic. He moved back to the Nationwide Tour in 2006. He finished in 8th place on the Nationwide Tour's money list in 2007 to earn his PGA Tour card for 2008. He was not able to retain his PGA Tour card in 2008 and returned to the Nationwide Tour in 2009. He won the Price Cutter Charity Championship in August 2009, his third victory on the Nationwide Tour. He finished 11th on the money list to earn his 2010 PGA Tour card.

Bolli lost his Tour card in 2010 after only making 4 cuts in 23 events. He played on the Web.com Tour for two years and was 44th on the 2012 money list going into the season finale. Bolli won the final event, moved up to ninth, and regained a PGA Tour card.

== Professional wins (10) ==
=== Web.com Tour wins (4) ===
Legend
Tour Championships (1)
Other Web.com Tour (3)

| No. | Date | Tournament | Winning score | Margin of victory | Runner(s)-up |
|---|---|---|---|---|---|
| 1 | May 9, 2004 | Chattanooga Classic | −21 (72-67-63-65=267) | 1 stroke | (United States) Chris Anderson, (United States) Johnson Wagner |
| 2 | Aug 12, 2007 | Northeast Pennsylvania Classic | −14 (68-67-69-66=270) | 1 stroke | (Wales) Richard Johnson, (United States) Patrick Sheehan |
| 3 | Aug 16, 2009 | Price Cutter Charity Championship | −21 (65-67-69-66=267) | 1 stroke | (United States) Chad Collins, (United States) Derek Lamely |
| 4 | Oct 28, 2012 | Web.com Tour Championship | −16 (65-71-67-65=268) | 2 strokes | (United States) James Hahn |

Web.com Tour playoff record (0–1)

| No. | Year | Tournament | Opponents | Result |
|---|---|---|---|---|
| 1 | 2004 | Knoxville Open | (United States) Shane Bertsch, (United States) Hunter Haas | Haas won with birdie on first extra hole |

=== NGA Hooters Tour wins (4) ===
| No. | Date | Tournament | Winning score | Margin of victory | Runner(s)-up |
|---|---|---|---|---|---|
| 1 | Mar 12, 2000 | Kandy Waters Memorial Classic | −12 (67-68-71-66=272) | 2 strokes | (United States) Ray Franz |
| 2 | Mar 11, 2001 | Kandy Waters Memorial Classic (2) | −14 (68-69-68-65=270) | Playoff | (United States) David Dyer |
| 3 | Jun 10, 2001 | Daikin America, Inc Pro Challenge | −10 (68-66=134) (Note: Shortened to 36 holes due to weather.) | 1 stroke | (United States) Greg Harper, (United States) David Howser, (United States) Edward Michaels, (United States) David Mobley |
| 4 | May 25, 2003 | President Casino Broadwater Classic | −18 (67-70-65-68=270) | Playoff | (United States) Elliot Gealy |

=== Other (1) ===
- 2003 Georgia Open

== See also ==
- 2004 Nationwide Tour graduates
- 2007 Nationwide Tour graduates
- 2009 Nationwide Tour graduates
- 2012 Web.com Tour graduates
- List of golfers with most Web.com Tour wins
