= Richard S. Johnson (golfer) =

Swedish professional golfer

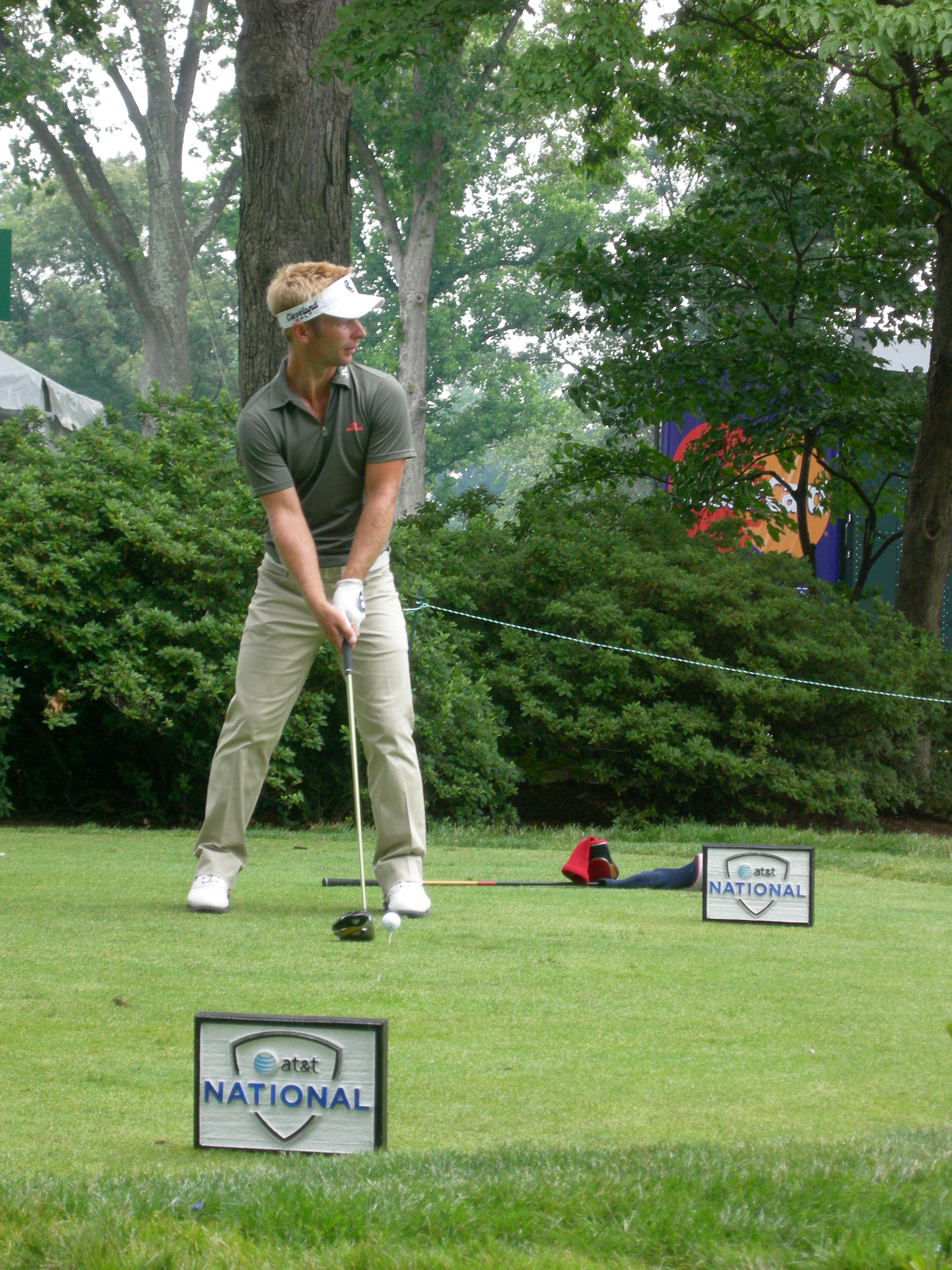

Personal information
- Full name: Carl Richard Stanley Johnson
- Nationality: Sweden
- Born: 15 October 1976 (age 50) Stockholm, Sweden
- Height: 5 ft 7 in (1.70 m)
- Weight: 145 lb (66 kg; 10.4 st)

Career
- Sport: Golf
- Turned professional: 1998
- Current tours: PGA Tour (past champion status)
- Former tours: Web.com Tour; European Tour
- Professional wins: 5
- Highest ranking: 94 (28 May 2006)

Number of wins by tour
- PGA Tour: 1
- European Tour: 2
- PGA Tour of Australasia: 1
- Challenge Tour: 1
- Other: 1

Best results in major championships
- Masters Tournament: DNP
- PGA Championship: CUT: 2005, 2006, 2008
- U.S. Open: CUT: 2003
- The Open Championship: T8: 2009

Carl Richard Stanley Johnson (born 15 October 1976) is a Swedish professional golfer.

== Early life ==
Johnson was born in Stockholm. His paternal grandfather is an American from New Jersey who settled in Sweden and married a Swede. Johnson was formerly a pro skateboarder. He also played handball and tennis in his youth.

== Professional career ==
Johnson played on the European Tour and won the ANZ Championship in 2002.

Johnson joined the PGA Tour in 2003 after successfully negotiating qualifying school. He has managed to gain at least partial status on the tour every year since. He placed in the top 50 of the money list in 2006. He earned his card for the 2008 PGA Tour season at the 2007 PGA Tour Qualifying Tournament. He won his first title in 2008, the U.S. Bank Championship in Milwaukee, but has not had much further PGA Tour success.

Johnson has had some success in Europe since then. Johnson won the Scandinavian Masters in 2010 on the European Tour. In 2016, Johnson earned a European Tour card through Q School.

== Personal life ==
Johnson resides in Jupiter, Florida.

== Professional wins (5) ==
=== PGA Tour wins (1) ===
No.	Date	Tournament	Winning score	Margin of victory	Runner-up
1	20 Jul 2008	U.S. Bank Championship in Milwaukee	−16 (63-67-70-64=264)	1 stroke	(United States) Ken Duke

PGA Tour playoff record (0–1)

No.	Year	Tournament	Opponent	Result
1	2006	Bank of America Colonial	(United States) Tim Herron	Lost to birdie on second extra hole

=== European Tour wins (2) ===
No.	Date	Tournament	Winning score	Margin of victory	Runner(s)-up
1	10 Feb 2002	ANZ Championship^{1}	46 pts (3-16-16-11=46)	2 points	(Australia) Scott Laycock, (Australia) Craig Parry
2	25 Jul 2010	Nordea Scandinavian Masters	−11 (70-66-70-71=277)	1 stroke	(Argentina) Rafael Echenique

^{1}Co-sanctioned by the PGA Tour of Australasia

=== Challenge Tour wins (1) ===
No.	Date	Tournament	Winning score	Margin of victory	Runner-up
1	4 Jul 1999	Neuchâtel Open Golf Trophy	−12 (68-69-64=201)	1 stroke	(Germany) Erol Şimşek

=== Nordic Golf League wins (1) ===
No.	Date	Tournament	Winning score	Margin of victory	Runners-up
1	30 May 1999	Kinnaborg Open	−5 (65-69-71=205)	Playoff	(Norway) Don Bell, (Denmark) Thomas Nørret

== Results in major championships ==
Tournament	2003	2004	2005	2006	2007	2008	2009	2010
U.S. Open	CUT							
The Open Championship							T8	T74
PGA Championship			CUT	CUT		CUT		

Note: Johnson never played in the Masters Tournament.

Top 10
Did not play

CUT = missed the half-way cut
"T" = tied

== Results in The Players Championship ==
Tournament	2004	2005	2006	2007	2008	2009	2010
The Players Championship	CUT		T27	CUT		T45	CUT

Did not play

CUT = missed the halfway cut
"T" indicates a tie for a place

== Results in World Golf Championships ==
Tournament	2010
Match Play	
Championship	
Invitational	
Champions	T34

Did not play

"T" = Tied

== See also ==
- 2002 PGA Tour Qualifying School graduates
- 2007 PGA Tour Qualifying School graduates
- 2010 PGA Tour Qualifying School graduates
- 2016 European Tour Qualifying School graduates
