= 2011 Players Championship =

Tournament information
- Dates: May 12–15, 2011
- Location: Ponte Vedra Beach, Florida; 30.198°N 81.394°W
- Courses: TPC Sawgrass; Stadium Course
- Tour: PGA Tour

Statistics
- Par: 72
- Length: 7,215 yards (6,597 m)
- Field: 145 players, 74 after cut
- Cut: 144 (E)
- Prize fund: $9.5 million
- Winner's share: $1.71 million

Champion
- (South Korea) K. J. Choi
- 275 (−13), playoff
- Location in the United States Location in Florida

The 2011 Players Championship was a golf tournament in Florida on the PGA Tour, held May 12–15 at TPC Sawgrass in Ponte Vedra Beach, southeast of Jacksonville. It was the 38th Players Championship.

K. J. Choi defeated David Toms on the first hole of a sudden-death playoff to claim his first PGA Tour title since 2008.

Traditionally, the flag of the defending champion (2010 winner Tim Clark of South Africa) flies at TPC Sawgrass during the week of the Players. As a tribute to the recently deceased Seve Ballesteros, per Clark's request, the PGA Tour flew the Spanish flag in its place. Clark withdrew during the second round due to nagging elbow problems.

== Venue ==
This was the 30th Players Championship held at the TPC at Sawgrass Stadium Course and it remained at 7,215 yards (6,597 m).

=== Course layout ===
The 2011 Players Championship
Tee	Rating/Slope	1	2	3	4	5	6	7	8	9	Out	10	11	12	13	14	15	16	17	18	In	Total
Yards	n/a	423	532	177	384	471	393	442	237	583	3,642	424	558	358	181	481	449	523	137	462	3,573	7,215
Par		4	5	3	4	4	4	4	3	5	36	4	5	4	3	4	4	5	3	4	36	72

== Field ==
The field consisted of 144 players meeting criteria 1–12, plus the winner of the 2010 Senior Players Championship.

1. Winners of PGA Tour events since last Players

Stuart Appleby (3), Arjun Atwal (3), Aaron Baddeley (3,11), Matt Bettencourt (3), Michael Bradley, Jonathan Byrd (3), Tim Clark (2,3,6,9), Jason Day (2,3,9), Luke Donald (2,3,7,9,11), Jim Furyk (2,3,8,9), Robert Garrigus (3), Lucas Glover (3,5), Bill Haas (3,9), Charley Hoffman (2,3), Dustin Johnson (2,3,9), Zach Johnson (2,3,5,9), Martin Kaymer (5,9), Matt Kuchar (2,3,9), Martin Laird (2,3,9,11), Bill Lunde (3), Hunter Mahan (2,3,7,9), Graeme McDowell (3,5,9), Rocco Mediate (3), Phil Mickelson (2,3,5,6,7,8,9,11), Louis Oosthuizen (5,9), Carl Pettersson (3), D. A. Points (3), Justin Rose (2,3,9), Rory Sabbatini (3), Charl Schwartzel (5,9), Adam Scott (2,3,9), Heath Slocum (3), Brandt Snedeker (3,9,11), Brendan Steele, Steve Stricker (2,3,9), Jhonattan Vegas, Johnson Wagner, Nick Watney (2,3,7,9,11), Bubba Watson (2,3,9,11), Mark Wilson (3,11), Gary Woodland (9,11)

- Lee Westwood (9) did not play.

2. Top 30 from previous season's FedEx Cup points list

Robert Allenby (3,9), Paul Casey (3,9), K. J. Choi (3,9), Ben Crane (3,9), Ernie Els (3,7,9), Retief Goosen (3,9), Ryan Moore (3,9), Kevin Na (3), Geoff Ogilvy (3,5,7,9), Jeff Overton (3), Ryan Palmer (3), Kevin Streelman (3), Bo Van Pelt (3,9), Camilo Villegas (3,8)

3. Top 125 from previous season's PGA Tour money list

Blake Adams, Stephen Ames (6), Ricky Barnes, Cameron Beckman, Kris Blanks, Jason Bohn, Ángel Cabrera (5), Chad Campbell, Alex Čejka, Greg Chalmers, Stewart Cink (5), Chad Collins, Michael Connell, Chris Couch, Ben Curtis, Brian Davis, Brendon de Jonge, Jason Dufner, Joe Durant, David Duval, Rickie Fowler (9), Sergio García (6), Brian Gay, Paul Goydos, Pádraig Harrington (5,9), J. P. Hayes, J. J. Henry, J. B. Holmes, Charles Howell III, Ryuji Imada, Freddie Jacobson, Matt Jones, Jerry Kelly, Anthony Kim (9), Derek Lamely, Marc Leishman, Justin Leonard, Spencer Levin, Davis Love III, Steve Marino, Troy Merritt, Shaun Micheel, Bryce Molder, Sean O'Hair, Corey Pavin, Pat Perez, Kenny Perry, Tim Petrovic, Ian Poulter (7,9), Alex Prugh, Chris Riley, John Rollins, Andrés Romero, John Senden, Michael Sim, Webb Simpson (11), Vijay Singh (7), Kevin Stadler, Chris Stroud, Kevin Sutherland, Vaughn Taylor, Josh Teater, David Toms, D. J. Trahan, Scott Verplank, Jimmy Walker, Boo Weekley, Charlie Wi, Garrett Willis, Dean Wilson, Tiger Woods (5,7,9), Yang Yong-eun (5,9)

- Graham DeLaet, Steve Elkington, Tom Gillis, Jeff Maggert, Rory McIlroy (9), and Roland Thatcher did not play.

4. Top 125 from current season - Medical Extension

Nick O'Hern

5. Major champions from the past five years

Trevor Immelman

6. Players Championship winners from the past five years

Henrik Stenson

7. WGC winners from the past three years (WGC-HSBC Champions winner only in 2010, and only if a PGA Tour member)

8. The Tour Championship winners from the past three years

9. Top 50 from the Official World Golf Ranking as of May 1

Ross Fisher, Peter Hanson, Robert Karlsson, Matteo Manassero, Edoardo Molinari, Francesco Molinari, Álvaro Quirós

- Anders Hansen, Ryo Ishikawa, Miguel Ángel Jiménez, and Kim Kyung-tae did not play.

10. Web.com Tour money leader from prior season

- Jamie Lovemark did not play.

11. Top 10 current year FedEx Cup points leaders as of May 1

12. Field filled to 144 through current year FedEx Cup standings as of May 1

Keegan Bradley, Kevin Chappell, Tommy Gainey, Hunter Haas, Brandt Jobe, Chris Kirk, Troy Matteson

13. Senior Players champion from prior year (did not count against field of 144)

Mark O'Meara

== Round summaries ==
=== First round ===
Thursday, May 12, 2011

Nick Watney made eight birdies, an eagle, and a double bogey en route to an opening round 64. Lucas Glover, coming off a win the week before at the Wells Fargo Championship, shot an opening round 65. Tiger Woods shot 42 (+6) on his first nine then withdrew, citing multiple injuries. Defending champion Tim Clark, who had been battling injuries all season, shot an opening round 74.

Place	Player	Score	To par
1	(United States) Nick Watney	64	−8
2	(United States) Lucas Glover	65	−7
T3	(United States) Mark O'Meara	66	−6
T3	(United States) David Toms	66	−6
T5	(Sweden) Freddie Jacobson	67	−5
T5	(Germany) Martin Kaymer	67	−5
T5	(Northern Ireland) Graeme McDowell	67	−5
T5	(Spain) Álvaro Quirós	67	−5
T5	(South Africa) Rory Sabbatini	67	−5
T10	(United States) Ben Crane	68	−4
T10	(United States) J. B. Holmes	68	−4
T10	(United States) Davis Love III	68	−4

=== Second round ===
Friday, May 13, 2011

David Toms posted a 68 to gain a one-shot lead over first round leader Nick Watney. Greg Chalmers had the round of the day at 65, while defending champion Tim Clark (tendonitis) and Geoff Ogilvy (shoulder) both withdrew. The cut was at even par 144, and 74 players advanced to the weekend.

Place	Player	Score	To par
1	(United States) David Toms	66-68=134	−10
2	(United States) Nick Watney	64-71=135	−9
T3	(England) Luke Donald	69-67=136	−8
T3	(United States) Lucas Glover	65-71=136	−8
T3	(Northern Ireland) Graeme McDowell	67-69=136	−8
T3	(United States) Steve Stricker	69-67=136	−8
T7	(Australia) Aaron Baddeley	70-67=137	−7
T7	(United States) J. B. Holmes	68-69=137	−7
T7	(United States) Davis Love III	68-69=137	−7
T7	(United States) Hunter Mahan	70-67=137	−7

=== Third round ===
Saturday, May 14, 2011

At the end of a rain soaked Saturday, Graeme McDowell and Nick Watney were tied for the lead at −11. Martin Kaymer birdied his first four holes and five of his first seven holes to temporarily tie for the lead, but bogeyed 8, 9 and 10 and ended the day 3 shots back.

Place	Player	Score	To par	Hole
T1	(Northern Ireland) Graeme McDowell	67-69-19=155	−11	5
T1	(United States) Nick Watney	64-71-18=153	−11	5
T3	(United States) Steve Stricker	69-67-20=156	−10	5
T3	(United States) David Toms	66-68-20=154	−10	5
T5	(South Korea) K. J. Choi	70-68-37=175	−9	10
T5	(United States) Lucas Glover	65-71-25=161	−9	6
T7	(England) Luke Donald	69-67-27=163	−8	8
T7	(United States) Jason Dufner	69-70-46=185	−8	12
T7	(Sweden) Robert Karlsson	71-67-34=172	−8	9
T7	(Germany) Martin Kaymer	67-72-46=185	−8	12
T7	(South Africa) Rory Sabbatini	67-71-38=176	−8	10

Sunday, May 15, 2011

Play resumed at 7:35 a.m. EDT with most of the leaders still on the front nine. Graeme McDowell held a three-shot lead standing on the 18th tee, but found the water on his approach and made double bogey. K. J. Choi stormed into contention with a 67 and was in the final threesome with McDowell and David Toms. Lucas Glover also finished with a double bogey and fell out of contention. Peter Hanson, who finished the following night, had the best third round at 66.

Place	Player	Score	To par
1	(Northern Ireland) Graeme McDowell	67-69-68=204	−12
T2	(South Korea) K. J. Choi	70-68-67=205	−11
T2	(United States) David Toms	66-68-71=205	−11
T4	(Australia) Aaron Baddeley	70-67-70=207	−9
T4	(England) Luke Donald	69-67-71=207	−9
T4	(United States) Jason Dufner	69-70-68=207	−9
T4	(United States) Davis Love III	68-69-70=207	−9
T4	(United States) Steve Stricker	69-67-71=207	−9
T4	(United States) Nick Watney	64-71-72=207	−9
T10	(United States) Paul Goydos	69-70-69=208	−8
T10	(Spain) Álvaro Quirós	67-73-68=208	−8

=== Final round ===
Sunday, May 15, 2011

Four different players held a share of the lead in the final round, which came down to the final group. Third round leader Graeme McDowell struggled to a 79, including double bogey on 17, and fell out of the top thirty. Charlie Hoffman stormed into contention before a quadruple bogey 7 on the infamous 17th hole led to 71. Paul Goydos, the 2008 runner-up, made a move with a 69, but came up two shots short of a playoff.

David Toms, who held the lead almost the entire day, had a one shot lead over K. J. Choi as they played the par-5 16th. Toms went for the green in two and hit it into the water right. He made bogey and was now tied with Choi. On the 17th, Choi made a 10-foot (3 m) birdie putt to take the outright lead for the first time in the tournament. After Toms drove it into a divot on the 18th hole, he hit his approach to 20 feet (6 m). Choi, who pushed his drive right, came up short right of the 18th green and chipped up to five feet. Toms made his birdie putt, only the fourth of the day on 18, to put the pressure back on Choi, who made his par putt to force a playoff.

Champion
(c) = past champion

Place	Player	Score	To par	Money ($)
T1	(South Korea) K. J. Choi	70-68-67-70=275	−13	Playoff
T1	(United States) David Toms	66-68-71-70=275	−13	Playoff
3	(United States) Paul Goydos	69-70-69-69=277	−11	646,000
T4	(England) Luke Donald	69-67-71-71=278	−10	418,000
T4	(United States) Nick Watney	64-71-72-71=278	−10	418,000
T6	(Australia) Aaron Baddeley	70-67-70-72=279	−9	287,375
T6	(Australia) Jason Day	69-70-72-68=279	−9	287,375
T6	(United States) Jason Dufner	69-70-68-72=279	−9	287,375
T6	(United States) J. B. Holmes	68-69-73-69=279	−9	287,375
T6	(United States) Hunter Mahan	70-67-73-69=279	−9	287,375
T6	(Spain) Álvaro Quirós	67-73-68-71=279	−9	287,375

Leaderboard below the top 10
Place	Player	Score	To par	Money ($)
T12	(Spain) Sergio García (c)	74-68-73-65=280	−8	175,071
T12	(United States) Brian Gay	71-69-71-69=280	−8	175,071
T12	(United States) Zach Johnson	74-70-70-66=280	−8	175,071
T12	(United States) Spencer Levin	72-69-68-71=280	−8	175,071
T12	(United States) Davis Love III (c)	68-69-70-73=280	−8	175,071
T12	(United States) Steve Stricker	69-67-71-73=280	−8	175,071
T12	(United States) Chris Stroud	71-67-74-68=280	−8	175,071
T19	(United States) Stewart Cink	70-72-69-70=281	−7	107,214
T19	(Sweden) Peter Hanson	72-72-66-71=281	−7	107,214
T19	(Australia) Matt Jones	72-72-69-68=281	−7	107,214
T19	(Germany) Martin Kaymer	67-72-70-72=281	−7	107,214
T19	(United States) Steve Marino	70-72-69-70=281	−7	107,214
T19	(United States) Sean O'Hair	71-71-67-72=281	−7	107,214
T19	(United States) Kevin Streelman	70-69-75-67=281	−7	107,214
T26	(United States) Chad Campbell	73-71-69-69=282	−6	67,450
T26	(England) Brian Davis	69-69-73-71=282	−6	67,450
T26	(United States) Charley Hoffman	72-71-68-71=282	−6	67,450
T26	(Sweden) Robert Karlsson	71-67-72-72=282	−6	67,450
T26	(United States) Jeff Overton	69-71-73-69=282	−6	67,450
T26	(South Africa) Rory Sabbatini	67-71-71-73=282	−6	67,450
T26	(South Africa) Charl Schwartzel	72-71-71-68=282	−6	67,450
T33	(South Africa) Trevor Immelman	70-73-70-70=283	−5	50,191
T33	(Northern Ireland) Graeme McDowell	67-69-68-79=283	−5	50,191
T33	(United States) Phil Mickelson (c)	71-71-69-72=283	−5	50,191
T33	(United States) Bryce Molder	70-73-67-73=283	−5	50,191
T33	(United States) Ryan Moore	71-69-71-72=283	−5	50,191
T33	(Sweden) Carl Pettersson	73-71-71-68=283	−5	50,191
T39	(United States) Kenny Perry	72-71-68-73=284	−4	41,800
T39	(Argentina) Andrés Romero	72-69-69-74=284	−4	41,800
T41	(United States) Jonathan Byrd	71-73-72-69=285	−3	36,100
T41	(Argentina) Ángel Cabrera	70-74-68-73=285	−3	36,100
T41	(Australia) Greg Chalmers	73-65-74-73=285	−3	36,100
T41	(South Korea) Charlie Wi	70-72-68-75=285	−3	36,100
T45	(United States) Ben Crane	68-76-71-71=286	−2	27,816
T45	(United States) Corey Pavin	72-69-74-71=286	−2	27,816
T45	(England) Justin Rose	70-69-74-73=286	−2	27,816
T45	(United States) Bubba Watson	76-66-76-68=286	−2	27,816
T45	(United States) Garrett Willis	70-74-69-73=286	−2	27,816
T50	(Australia) Robert Allenby	69-74-68-76=287	−1	23,132
T50	(United States) Chris Couch	71-72-71-73=287	−1	23,132
T50	(United States) Ben Curtis	71-73-70-73=287	−1	23,132
T50	(United States) Lucas Glover	65-71-74-77=287	−1	23,132
T54	(United States) Matt Kuchar	69-72-73-74=288	E	21,850
T54	(United States) Rocco Mediate	72-69-71-76=288	E	21,850
T54	(United States) Scott Verplank	73-71-71-73=288	E	21,850
T57	(India) Arjun Atwal	73-70-77-69=289	+1	21,185
T57	(United States) Dustin Johnson	72-70-73-74=289	+1	21,185
T57	(United States) Justin Leonard (c)	70-73-72-74=289	+1	21,185
T57	(England) Ian Poulter	70-72-74-73=289	+1	21,185
T61	(United States) Jason Bohn	71-73-72-74=290	+2	20,520
T61	(South Africa) Retief Goosen	73-69-72-76=290	+2	20,520
T61	(United States) Troy Merritt	69-75-73-73=290	+2	20,520
T64	(United States) Kris Blanks	69-72-81-69=291	+3	19,760
T64	(United States) Hunter Haas	72-71-75-73=291	+3	19,760
T64	(Sweden) Freddie Jacobson	67-75-73-76=291	+3	19,760
T64	(United States) Jerry Kelly	73-70-73-75=291	+3	19,760
T64	(Italy) Matteo Manassero	72-70-73-76=291	+3	19,760
T69	(United States) Kevin Chappell	71-73-80-68=292	+4	19,000
T69	(Scotland) Martin Laird	72-70-76-74=292	+4	19,000
T69	(United States) Webb Simpson	70-73-74-75=292	+4	19,000
72	(United States) Keegan Bradley	75-69-72-77=293	+5	18,620
73	(United States) Robert Garrigus	74-69-76-75=294	+6	18,430
74	(United States) Mark O'Meara	66-74-79-77=296	+8	18,240
CUT	(Canada) Stephen Ames (c)	77-68=145	+1	
CUT	(United States) Michael Bradley	71-74=145	+1	
CUT	(United States) Joe Durant	73-72=145	+1	
CUT	(South Africa) Ernie Els	72-73=145	+1	
CUT	(United States) Rickie Fowler	77-68=145	+1	
CUT	(Japan) Ryuji Imada	73-72=145	+1	
CUT	(United States) Brandt Jobe	75-70=145	+1	
CUT	(United States) Kevin Na	73-72=145	+1	
CUT	(United States) Heath Slocum	71-74=145	+1	
CUT	(United States) Kevin Stadler	73-72=145	+1	
CUT	(United States) D. J. Trahan	75-70=145	+1	
CUT	(United States) Bo Van Pelt	76-69=145	+1	
CUT	(Colombia) Camilo Villegas	74-71=145	+1	
CUT	(United States) Mark Wilson	70-75=145	+1	
CUT	(South Korea) Yang Yong-eun	69-76=145	+1	
CUT	(England) Paul Casey	71-75=146	+2	
CUT	(United States) David Duval (c)	70-76=146	+2	
CUT	(England) Ross Fisher	73-73=146	+2	
CUT	(United States) Bill Haas	74-72=146	+2	
CUT	(United States) J. P. Hayes	73-73=146	+2	
CUT	(United States) Shaun Micheel	71-75=146	+2	
CUT	(Italy) Francesco Molinari	76-70=146	+2	
CUT	(United States) Ryan Palmer	70-76=146	+2	
CUT	(United States) Jimmy Walker	77-69=146	+2	
CUT	(United States) Boo Weekley	75-71=146	+2	
CUT	(United States) Dean Wilson	77-69=146	+2	
CUT	(United States) Gary Woodland	75-71=146	+2	
CUT	(United States) Jim Furyk	71-76=147	+3	
CUT	(United States) J. J. Henry	74-73=147	+3	
CUT	(United States) Charles Howell III	73-74=147	+3	
CUT	(United States) Derek Lamely	74-73=147	+3	
CUT	(Australia) Nick O'Hern	76-71=147	+3	
CUT	(South Africa) Louis Oosthuizen	71-76=147	+3	
CUT	(United States) Alex Prugh	75-72=147	+3	
CUT	(Fiji) Vijay Singh	75-72=147	+3	
CUT	(United States) Brandt Snedeker	73-74=147	+3	
CUT	(United States) Kevin Sutherland	72-75=147	+3	
CUT	(United States) Blake Adams	72-76=148	+4	
CUT	(United States) Ricky Barnes	70-78=148	+4	
CUT	(United States) Cameron Beckman	72-76=148	+4	
CUT	(United States) Chad Collins	74-74=148	+4	
CUT	(United States) Pat Perez	76-72=148	+4	
CUT	(United States) Tim Petrovic	75-73=148	+4	
CUT	(United States) D. A. Points	74-74=148	+4	
CUT	(United States) John Rollins	73-75=148	+4	
CUT	(Australia) Adam Scott (c)	76-72=148	+4	
CUT	(Australia) Michael Sim	76-72=148	+4	
CUT	(United States) Josh Teater	72-76=148	+4	
CUT	(Australia) Stuart Appleby	76-73=149	+5	
CUT	(United States) Tommy Gainey	75-74=149	+5	
CUT	(United States) Chris Kirk	76-73=149	+5	
CUT	(United States) Chris Riley	72-77=149	+5	
CUT	(United States) Vaughn Taylor	76-73=149	+5	
CUT	(United States) Johnson Wagner	74-75=149	+5	
CUT	(Germany) Alex Čejka	72-78=150	+6	
CUT	(United States) Anthony Kim	74-76=150	+6	
CUT	(United States) Bill Lunde	73-77=150	+6	
CUT	(Italy) Edoardo Molinari	72-78=150	+6	
CUT	(United States) Brendan Steele	78-72=150	+6	
CUT	(United States) Michael Connell	73-78=151	+7	
CUT	(Republic of Ireland) Pádraig Harrington	73-78=151	+7	
CUT	(Australia) John Senden	76-75=151	+7	
CUT	(United States) Matt Bettencourt	79-74=153	+9	
CUT	(Zimbabwe) Brendon de Jonge	81-73=154	+10	
CUT	(United States) Troy Matteson	78-76=154	+10	
CUT	(Sweden) Henrik Stenson (c)	79-75=154	+10	
CUT	(Venezuela) Jhonattan Vegas	78-77=155	+11	
CUT	(Australia) Marc Leishman	81-80=161	+17	
WD	(South Africa) Tim Clark (c)	74	+2	
WD	(Australia) Geoff Ogilvy	75	+3	
WD	(United States) Tiger Woods (c)			

==== Scorecard ====
Final round

Hole	1	2	3	4	5	6	7	8	9	10	11	12	13	14	15	16	17	18
Par	4	5	3	4	4	4	4	3	5	4	5	4	3	4	4	5	3	4
(South Korea) Choi	−12	−12	−12	−12	−11	−11	−11	−11	−11	−12	−11	−11	−12	−12	−12	−12	−13	−13
(United States) Toms	−11	−12	−12	−13	−13	−14	−14	−13	−13	−13	−13	−13	−13	−13	−13	−12	−12	−13
(United States) Goydos	−8	−8	−8	−8	−7	−8	−8	−8	−9	−10	−11	−11	−10	−10	−10	−11	−11	−11
(England) Donald	−9	−8	−8	−9	−9	−8	−9	−9	−9	−10	−10	−10	−10	−9	−9	−10	−10	−10
(United States) Watney	−10	−11	−12	−11	−11	−11	−12	−11	−10	−10	−10	−11	−11	−10	−10	−10	−10	−10
(Northern Ireland) McDowell	−12	−12	−12	−12	−13	−12	−11	−11	−10	−10	−10	−10	−9	−9	−8	−8	−6	−5

Cumulative tournament scores, relative to par

Birdie	Bogey	Double bogey

==== Playoff ====
This was the fourth playoff in Players Championship history and the first since Sergio García defeated Paul Goydos in 2008. The format was again sudden death, on a rotation of holes 17-18-16-17-18 until there is a winner. On the first extra hole, both players made it on the island green 17th, but both had long birdie putts. After Choi lagged up to three feet, Toms had 23 feet (7 m) for the win, but barely missed; it went three and a half feet past, and he lipped out his comebacker for par. Choi sank the putt for his first win on the PGA Tour since 2008.

Place	Player	Score	To par	Money ($)
1	(South Korea) K. J. Choi	3	E	1,710,000
2	(United States) David Toms	4	+1	1,026,000

- Playoff was at the par-3 17th hole
