= 2009 PGA Tour Qualifying School graduates =

This is a list of the 25 players who earned their 2010 PGA Tour card through Q School in 2009.

Place	Player	PGA Tour starts	Cuts made	Notes
1	(United States) Troy Merritt	0	0	1 Nationwide Tour win
2	(United States) Jeff Maggert	500	318	3 PGA Tour wins
3	(Australia) Matt Jones	49	29	
4	(United States) Martin Flores	1	0	
T5	(United States) Neal Lancaster	557	320	1 PGA Tour win
T5	(Zimbabwe) Brendon de Jonge	55	28	1 Nationwide Tour win
7	(United States) Billy Horschel	3	0	
T8	(Australia) David Lutterus	23	7	
T8	(United States) J. P. Hayes	373	190	2 PGA Tour wins; disqualified himself during 2008 Q School
T8	(Canada) Graham DeLaet	2	1	3 Canadian Tour wins
11	(United States) Jay Williamson	347	180	1 Nationwide Tour win
T12	(United States) Chris Wilson	1	0	
T12	(United States) Kris Blanks	19	9	1 Nationwide Tour win
T12	(South Africa) Brenden Pappas	131	65	1 Nationwide Tour win
T15	(United States) Shane Bertsch	131	61	2 Nationwide Tour wins
T15	(United States) Omar Uresti	313	160	2 Nationwide Tour wins
T15	(United States) Rickie Fowler	8	5	
T15	(United States) Joe Ogilvie	298	171	1 PGA Tour win
T19	(United States) Cameron Tringale	1	0	
T19	(United States) Brian Stuard	0	0	
T19	(United States) Michael Connell	25	5	
T19	(United States) Chris Riley	276	179	1 PGA Tour win
T23	(United States) Spencer Levin	37	19	3 Canadian Tour wins
T23	(United States) Brent Delahoussaye	1	1	
T23	(South Africa) Andrew McLardy	34	16	5 Sunshine Tour wins

== 2010 Results ==
Player	Starts	Cuts made	Best finish	Money list rank	Earnings ($)
(United States) Troy Merritt*	29	14	3	125	786,977
(United States) Jeff Maggert	28	11	3	121	801,579
(Australia) Matt Jones	27	17	5	72	1,215,743
(United States) Martin Flores*	26	11	T10	175	318,673
(United States) Neal Lancaster	0	0	n/a	n/a	0
(Zimbabwe) Brendon de Jonge	32	24	3/T3 (three times)	34	2,167,978
(United States) Billy Horschel*	4	0	n/a	n/a	0
(Australia) David Lutterus	25	8	T27	201	123,170
(United States) J. P. Hayes	25	14	T4	113	862,523
(Canada) Graham DeLaet*	28	15	T3	100	954,011
(United States) Jay Williamson	24	13	T8	167	404,098
(United States) Chris Wilson*	26	7	T52	213	76,481
(United States) Kris Blanks	30	15	2	82	1,109,178
(South Africa) Brenden Pappas	24	9	T30	197	133,584
(United States) Shane Bertsch	4	3	T25	219	57,108
(United States) Omar Uresti	27	10	T8	182	283,455
(United States) Rickie Fowler*	28	20	2 (twice)	22	2,857,108
(United States) Joe Ogilvie	32	17	T8	143	641,797
(United States) Cameron Tringale*	22	5	T11 (twice)	179	302,618
(United States) Brian Stuard*	28	13	T2	154	536,497
(United States) Michael Connell	25	19	T6	115	846,459
(United States) Chris Riley	24	12	T4	90	1,001,582
(United States) Spencer Levin	31	24	T3	74	1,199,672
(United States) Brent Delahoussaye*	21	7	T51	217	69,708
(South Africa) Andrew McLardy	21	5	T52	223	53,106

*PGA Tour rookie in 2010
T = Tied
Green background indicates the player retained his PGA Tour card for 2011 (finished inside the top 125).
Yellow background indicates the player did not retain his PGA Tour card for 2011, but retained conditional status (finished between 126-150).
Red background indicates the player did not retain his PGA Tour card for 2011 (finished outside the top 150).

== Runners-up on the PGA Tour in 2010 ==
No.	Date	Player	Tournament	Winner	Winning score	Runner-up score
1	Feb 21	(United States) Brian Stuard	Mayakoba Golf Classic	(United States) Cameron Beckman	−11 (65-68-69-67=269)	−9 (67-67-71-66=271)
2	Feb 28	(United States) Rickie Fowler	Waste Management Phoenix Open	(United States) Hunter Mahan	−16 (68-70-65-65=268)	−15 (65-67-69-68=269)
3	Mar 15	(United States) Kris Blanks	Puerto Rico Open	(United States) Derek Lamely	−19 (69-71-63-66=269)	−17 (65-70-67-69=271)
4	Jun 6	(United States) Rickie Fowler	Memorial Tournament	(England) Justin Rose	−18 (65-69-70-66=270)	−15 (65-66-69-73=273)

== See also ==
- 2009 Nationwide Tour graduates
