= Chris Wilson (golfer) =

American professional golfer (born 1984)

Personal information
- Nationality: United States
- Born: October 16, 1984 (age 42) Columbus, Ohio, U.S.
- Height: 6 ft 2 in (1.88 m)
- Weight: 185 lb (84 kg; 13.2 st)

Career
- Sport: Golf
- College: Northwestern University
- Turned professional: 2007
- Current tour: Web.com Tour
- Former tour: PGA Tour
- Professional wins: 1

Number of wins by tour
- Korn Ferry Tour: 1

Best results in major championships
- Masters Tournament: DNP
- PGA Championship: DNP
- U.S. Open: CUT: 2011
- The Open Championship: DNP

Chris Wilson (born October 16, 1984) is an American professional golfer.

== Early life ==
Wilson was born in Columbus, Ohio. He played college golf at Northwestern University and won the Big Ten Championship in 2006. He graduated in 2007.

== Professional career ==
In 2007, Wilson turned professional. He played on the PGA Tour in 2010 after earning his card at Qualifying school. His best finish was T-51 at the Valero Texas Open; he only made seven cuts in 26 events and lost his PGA Tour privileges. He played on the Web.com Tour in 2012 and won his first tour event in August at the Price Cutter Charity Championship.

== Professional wins (1) ==
=== Web.com Tour wins (1) ===
No.	Date	Tournament	Winning score	Margin of victory	Runner-up
1	Aug 12, 2012	Price Cutter Charity Championship	−21 (68-67-65-67=267)	Playoff	(United States) Scott Harrington

Web.com Tour playoff record (1–0)

No.	Year	Tournament	Opponent	Result
1	2012	Price Cutter Charity Championship	(United States) Scott Harrington	Won with birdie on first extra hole

== See also ==
- 2009 PGA Tour Qualifying School graduates
