= 2005 PGA Tour Qualifying School graduates =

This is a list of the 32 players who earned their 2006 PGA Tour card through Q School in 2005.

Place	Player	PGA Tour starts	Cuts made	Notes
1	(United States) J. B. Holmes	2	0	
2	(Germany) Alex Čejka	101	57	4 European Tour wins
T3	(United States) Nicholas Thompson	0	0	
T3	(United States) D. A. Points	35	15	3 Nationwide Tour wins
T5	(United States) Nick Watney	40	17	1 Nationwide Tour win
T5	(United States) Tom Byrum	549	313	1 PGA Tour win
T7	(Japan) Daisuke Maruyama	1	0	1 Japan Golf Tour win
T7	(United States) Michael Allen	251	118	1 European Tour win, 1 Nationwide Tour win
T9	(United States) Hunter Mahan	75	39	
T9	(United States) Will MacKenzie	25	12	
T9	(United States) Robert Garrigus	1	0	
12	(United States) Marco Dawson	296	154	1 Nationwide Tour win
T13	(United States) John Engler	2	0	
T13	(United States) Jeff Overton	1	0	
T13	(United States) Bubba Dickerson	12	5	
T13	(United States) Ron Whittaker	27	9	
T13	(Norway) Henrik Bjørnstad	0	0	
T18	(United States) Brian Bateman	115	62	1 Nationwide Tour win
T18	(Canada) Ian Leggatt	112	51	1 PGA Tour win
T18	(United States) Alex Aragon	0	0	
T18	(United States) Matt Hansen	0	0	
T18	(United States) Mike Sposa	149	80	1 Nationwide Tour win
T18	(United States) Ryan Hietala	0	0	1 Nationwide Tour win
T18	(United States) Greg Kraft	341	182	1 Nationwide Tour win
T18	(United States) Bill Glasson	454	275	7 PGA Tour wins
T26	(United States) Bill Haas	19	13	
T26	(United States) Frank Lickliter	303	191	2 PGA Tour wins
T26	(United States) Danny Ellis	88	40	Runner-up in 1993 U.S. Amateur
T26	(United States) Michael Connell	3	1	
T26	(United States) Brett Wetterich	72	23	2 Nationwide Tour wins
T26	(Sweden) Mathias Grönberg	67	30	4 European Tour wins
T26	(United States) B. J. Staten	0	0	

- Players in yellow are 2006 PGA Tour rookies.

== 2006 Results ==
Player	Starts	Cuts made	Best finish	Money list rank	Earnings ($)
(United States) J. B. Holmes*	26	16	Win	59	1,487,604
(Germany) Alex Čejka	30	16	T3	145	525,484
(United States) Nicholas Thompson*	32	15	T6	180	264,717
(United States) D. A. Points	28	12	T10	162	405,984
(United States) Nick Watney	29	19	T5 (twice)	75	1,243,816
(United States) Tom Byrum	11	3	T16	215	101,094
(Japan) Daisuke Maruyama*	29	14	T3	95	956,874
(United States) Michael Allen	25	17	T11	153	470,946
(United States) Hunter Mahan	29	21	T2	83	1,107,457
(United States) Will MacKenzie	29	16	Win	100	879,965
(United States) Robert Garrigus*	28	15	T4	144	537,595
(United States) Marco Dawson	27	16	T5	142	545,076
(United States) John Engler*	27	7	T39	222	72,964
(United States) Jeff Overton*	28	19	T9	136	577,132
(United States) Bubba Dickerson*	32	18	T5	127	650,314
(United States) Ron Whittaker	28	13	T9	174	300,033
(Norway) Henrik Bjørnstad*	31	17	T10	152	491,043
(United States) Brian Bateman	26	10	3	128	645,143
(Canada) Ian Leggatt	29	10	T6	168	377,903
(United States) Alex Aragon*	26	6	T27	219	94,504
(United States) Matt Hansen*	25	9	T18	194	187,252
(United States) Mike Sposa	25	10	T24	209	132,131
(United States) Ryan Hietala*	23	7	T38	220	87,772
(United States) Greg Kraft	26	14	T19	179	273,734
(United States) Bill Glasson	17	7	T22	210	127,932
(United States) Bill Haas*	30	19	T4	99	887,024
(United States) Frank Lickliter	29	19	T2	44	1,655,678
(United States) Danny Ellis	23	11	T7	166	382,500
(United States) Michael Connell*	22	4	T17	216	97,771
(United States) Brett Wetterich	25	16	Win	10	3,023,125
(Sweden) Mathias Grönberg	30	16	4	124	674,002
(United States) B. J. Staten*	18	7	T5	182	253,088

*PGA Tour rookie in 2006
T = Tied
Green background indicates the player retained his PGA Tour card for 2007 (finished inside the top 125).
Yellow background indicates the player did not retain his PGA Tour card for 2007, but retained conditional status (finished between 126-150).
Red background indicates the player did not retain his PGA Tour card for 2007 (finished outside the top 150).

== Winners on the PGA Tour in 2006 ==
No.	Date	Player	Tournament	Winning score	Margin of victory	Runner(s)-up
1	Feb 5	(United States) J. B. Holmes	FBR Open	−21 (68-64-65-66=263)	7 strokes	(United States) J. J. Henry, (United States) Steve Lowery, (United States) Ryan Palmer, (United States) Scott Verplank, (Colombia) Camilo Villegas
2	May 14	(United States) Brett Wetterich	EDS Byron Nelson Championship	−12 (66-64-70-68=268)	1 stroke	(South Africa) Trevor Immelman
3	Aug 27	(United States) Will MacKenzie	Reno-Tahoe Open	−20 (63-67-67-71=268)	1 stroke	(United States) Bob Estes

== Runners-up on the PGA Tour in 2006 ==
No.	Date	Player	Tournament	Winner	Winning score	Runner-up score
1	Jun 4	(United States) Brett Wetterich	Memorial Tournament	(Sweden) Carl Pettersson	−12 (69-67-69-71=276)	−10 (69-69-73-67=278)
2	Jul 2	(United States) Hunter Mahan	Buick Championship	(United States) J. J. Henry	−14 (68-68-63-67=266)	−11 (69-67-68-65=269)
3	Oct 22	(United States) Frank Lickliter	FUNAI Classic at the Walt Disney World Resort	(United States) Joe Durant	−25 (69-65-64-65=263)	−21 (68-70-67-62=267)
4	Oct 29	(United States) Brett Wetterich	Chrysler Championship	(South Korea) K. J. Choi	−13 (68-66-70-67=271)	−9 (72-70-67-66=275)

== See also ==
- 2005 Nationwide Tour graduates
