= 2010 Players Championship =

Tournament information
- Dates: May 6–9, 2010
- Location: Ponte Vedra Beach, Florida; 30.198°N 81.394°W
- Courses: TPC Sawgrass; Stadium Course
- Tour: PGA Tour

Statistics
- Par: 72
- Length: 7,215 yards (6,597 m)
- Field: 145 players, 70 after cut
- Cut: 142 (−2)
- Prize fund: $9.5 million
- Winner's share: $1.71 million

Champion
- (South Africa) Tim Clark
- 272 (−16)
- Location in the United States Location in Florida

The 2010 Players Championship was a golf tournament in Florida on the PGA Tour, held May 6–9 at TPC Sawgrass in Ponte Vedra Beach, southeast of Jacksonville. It was the 37th Players Championship.

Tim Clark won with a 67 on Sunday for his first PGA Tour victory, one stroke ahead of Robert Allenby.

Two unusual events occurred during this Players Championship. For the first time in tournament history, a spectator was arrested and forcibly removed from the course. An intoxicated fan who was screaming and being disruptive refused to listen to course officials, who then called deputies. The man resisted arrest and was tasered. In a separate incident, hours after the first round had ended a car was discovered parked on the 8th green with two occupants inside and the motor running. When the driver refused to follow instructions, law enforcement was called. The green was not damaged and the couple was issued trespass warnings, then escorted off the course.

Defending champion Henrik Stenson missed the 36-hole cut by a stroke.

== Venue ==
This was the 29th Players Championship held at the TPC at Sawgrass Stadium Course and it remained at 7,215 yards (6,597 m).

=== Course layout ===
The 2010 Players Championship
Tee	Rating/Slope	1	2	3	4	5	6	7	8	9	Out	10	11	12	13	14	15	16	17	18	In	Total
Yards	n/a	423	532	177	384	471	393	442	237	583	3,642	424	558	358	181	481	449	523	137	462	3,573	7,215
Par		4	5	3	4	4	4	4	3	5	36	4	5	4	3	4	4	5	3	4	36	72

== Field ==
The field consisted of 144 players meeting criteria 1–12, plus the winner of the 2009 Senior Players Championship.

1. Winners of PGA Tour events since last Players

Stephen Ames (3,6), Cameron Beckman (3), Jason Bohn (3), Stewart Cink (2,3,5,9), Ben Crane (3,11), Ernie Els (2,3,7,9,11), Jim Furyk (2,3,9,11), Brian Gay (2,3), Lucas Glover (2,3,5,9), Nathan Green (3), Bill Haas (3,11), Dustin Johnson (2,3,9,11), Zach Johnson (2,3,5,9), Matt Kuchar (3,9,11), Martin Laird (3), Derek Lamely, Hunter Mahan (2,3,9), Troy Matteson (3), Rory McIlroy (9), Phil Mickelson (2,3,5,6,7,8,9,11), Ryan Moore (3), Geoff Ogilvy (2,3,5,7,9), Ryan Palmer, Kenny Perry (2,3,9), Ian Poulter (3,7,9), John Rollins (3), Rory Sabbatini (3), Heath Slocum (2,3), Henrik Stenson (6,9), Bo Van Pelt (3), Camilo Villegas (3,8,9,11), Tiger Woods (2,3,5,7,8,9), Yang Yong-eun (2,3,5,9)

- Anthony Kim (3,9,11) and Steve Stricker (2,3,9,11) did not play.

2. Top 30 from previous season's FedEx Cup points list

Ángel Cabrera (3,5,9), Luke Donald (3,9), Jason Dufner (3), Pádraig Harrington (3,5,9), Jerry Kelly (3), Marc Leishman (3), Steve Marino (3), Kevin Na (3,9), Sean O'Hair (3,9), John Senden (3), David Toms (3), Scott Verplank (3), Nick Watney (3,9), Mike Weir (3)

- Retief Goosen (3,9) did not play.

3. Top 125 from previous season's PGA Tour money list

Michael Allen, Robert Allenby (9), Woody Austin, Aaron Baddeley, Briny Baird, Ricky Barnes, Matt Bettencourt, Michael Bradley, Jonathan Byrd, Mark Calcavecchia, Chad Campbell, Paul Casey (9), Alex Čejka, Greg Chalmers, K. J. Choi (9), Daniel Chopra, Tim Clark (9), Ben Curtis, Brian Davis, Jason Day, James Driscoll, Bob Estes, Steve Flesch, Harrison Frazar, Sergio García (6,9), Mathew Goggin, Paul Goydos, J. J. Henry, Charley Hoffman, J. B. Holmes, Charles Howell III, Ryuji Imada, Freddie Jacobson, Lee Janzen, Richard S. Johnson, Jeff Klauk, Justin Leonard, Michael Letzig, Davis Love III, Bill Lunde, John Mallinger, Scott McCarron, George McNeill, John Merrick, Bryce Molder, James Nitties, Nick O'Hern, Jeff Overton, Greg Owen, Rod Pampling, Pat Perez, Tim Petrovic, Scott Piercy, D. A. Points, Ted Purdy, Brett Quigley, Jeff Quinney, Andrés Romero, Justin Rose, Adam Scott (9), Webb Simpson, Vijay Singh (7,9), Brandt Snedeker, Kevin Stadler, Kevin Streelman, Chris Stroud, Kevin Sutherland, Vaughn Taylor, Roland Thatcher, Nicholas Thompson, D. J. Trahan, Jimmy Walker, Bubba Watson, Boo Weekley, Charlie Wi, Mark Wilson

- Rich Beem, Fred Couples, and Tom Watson did not play.

4. Top 125 from current season - Medical Extension

5. Major champions from the past five years

Trevor Immelman

- Michael Campbell did not play.

6. Players Championship winners from the past five years

Fred Funk

7. WGC winners from the past three years (except WGC-HSBC Champions)

8. The Tour Championship winners from the past three years

9. Top 50 from the Official World Golf Ranking as of April 25

Ross Fisher, Thongchai Jaidee, Robert Karlsson, Martin Kaymer, Graeme McDowell, Francesco Molinari, Álvaro Quirós, Charl Schwartzel, Lee Westwood, Oliver Wilson

- Søren Hansen, Yuta Ikeda, Ryo Ishikawa, Miguel Ángel Jiménez, Edoardo Molinari, Louis Oosthuizen, and Michael Sim (10) did not play.

10. Nationwide Tour money leader from prior season

11. Top 10 current year FedEx Cup points leaders as of April 25

12. Field filled to 144 through current year FedEx Cup standings as of April 25

Kris Blanks, Chad Collins, Chris Couch, Brendon de Jonge, Rickie Fowler, J. P. Hayes, Spencer Levin, Troy Merritt, Alex Prugh

13. Senior Players champion from prior year (did not count against field of 144)

Jay Haas

== Round summaries ==
=== First round ===
Thursday, May 6, 2010

Place	Player	Score	To par
T1	(Australia) Robert Allenby	66	−6
T1	(United States) J. B. Holmes	66	−6
T3	(United States) Jason Bohn	67	−5
T3	(United States) Ben Crane	67	−5
T3	(England) Luke Donald	67	−5
T3	(Japan) Ryuji Imada	67	−5
T3	(United States) Ryan Moore	67	−5
T3	(United States) Kenny Perry	67	−5
T3	(United States) Heath Slocum	67	−5
T3	(England) Lee Westwood	67	−5

=== Second round ===
Friday, May 7, 2010

Place	Player	Score	To par
1	(England) Lee Westwood	67-65=132	−12
T2	(Japan) Ryuji Imada	67-66=133	−11
T2	(Italy) Francesco Molinari	68-65=133	−11
T2	(United States) Heath Slocum	67-66=133	−11
5	(United States) Lucas Glover	70-65=135	−9
T6	(Australia) Robert Allenby	66-70=136	−8
T6	(United States) Ben Crane	67-69=136	−8
T6	(England) Luke Donald	67-69=136	−8
T6	(United States) Charley Hoffman	68-68=136	−8
T10	(South Korea) K. J. Choi	69-68=137	−7
T10	(United States) Paul Goydos	69-68=137	−7
T10	(United States) Bill Haas	68-69=137	−7
T10	(United States) Davis Love III	69-68=137	−7
T10	(Northern Ireland) Graeme McDowell	72-65=137	−7
T10	(United States) Ryan Moore	67-70=137	−7
T10	(United States) John Rollins	68-69=137	−7
T10	(United States) Bo Van Pelt	68-69=137	−7

=== Third round ===
Saturday, May 8, 2010

Place	Player	Score	To par
1	(England) Lee Westwood	67-65-70=202	−14
2	(Australia) Robert Allenby	66-70-67=203	−13
T3	(United States) Ben Crane	67-69-68=204	−12
T3	(United States) Lucas Glover	70-65-69=204	−12
T3	(Italy) Francesco Molinari	68-65-71=204	−12
T6	(South Africa) Tim Clark	68-71-66=205	−11
T6	(United States) Charley Hoffman	68-68-69=205	−11
T6	(United States) Heath Slocum	67-66-72=205	−11
T6	(United States) Chris Stroud	70-69-66=205	−11
10	(United States) Bo Van Pelt	68-69-69=206	−10

=== Final round ===
Sunday, May 9, 2010

Three strokes back, Tim Clark shot a bogey-free final round 67, ending with an 8-foot (2.4 m) par putt and was the clubhouse leader. Lee Westwood, the 54-hole leader, was even par through sixteen holes, but a water ball on the famed 17th hole led to a double bogey and ended any chance of victory. In the end it came down to Robert Allenby, in the final pairing and two strokes behind Clark with three holes to play. After just missing an eagle on the par 5 16th, the lead was cut to one. Allenby then knocked his tee shot to 10 feet (3 m) on 17, but again narrowly missed a putt to tie Clark. He had a last chance at 18, but failed to make birdie and Clark gained his first PGA Tour victory in his 206th start.

Champion
(c) = past champion

Place	Player	Score	To par	Money ($)
1	(South Africa) Tim Clark	68-71-66-67=272	−16	1,710,000
2	(Australia) Robert Allenby	66-70-67-70=273	−15	1,026,000
3	(United States) Lucas Glover	70-65-69-70=274	−14	646,000
T4	(United States) Ben Crane	67-69-68-72=276	−12	358,150
T4	(United States) Davis Love III (c)	69-68-71-68=276	−12	358,150
T4	(United States) Heath Slocum	67-66-72-71=276	−12	358,150
T4	(United States) Bo Van Pelt	68-69-69-70=276	−12	358,150
T4	(England) Lee Westwood	67-65-70-74=276	−12	358,150
9	(Italy) Francesco Molinari	68-65-71-73=277	−11	275,500
T10	(Sweden) Freddie Jacobson	69-70-69-71=279	−9	237,500
T10	(Argentina) Andrés Romero	69-70-69-71=279	−9	237,500
T10	(United States) Chris Stroud	70-69-66-74=279	−9	237,500

Leaderboard below the top 10
Place	Player	Score	To par	Money ($)
T13	(United States) J. B. Holmes	66-72-72-70=280	−8	178,125
T13	(United States) Matt Kuchar	68-71-70-71=280	−8	178,125
T13	(United States) John Rollins	68-69-70-73=280	−8	178,125
T13	(United States) Scott Verplank	71-70-69-70=280	−8	178,125
T17	(United States) Chris Couch	74-68-67-72=281	−7	133,000
T17	(United States) Hunter Mahan	70-69-70-72=281	−7	133,000
T17	(United States) Troy Matteson	68-71-71-71=281	−7	133,000
T17	(United States) Phil Mickelson (c)	70-71-66-74=281	−7	133,000
T17	(United States) Nick Watney	69-71-68-73=281	−7	133,000
T22	(United States) Charley Hoffman	68-68-69-77=282	−6	95,000
T22	(United States) Zach Johnson	70-70-67-75=282	−6	95,000
T22	(United States) Sean O'Hair	70-69-70-73=282	−6	95,000
T22	(United States) Kenny Perry	67-71-71-73=282	−6	95,000
T26	(England) Luke Donald	67-69-72-75=283	−5	68,875
T26	(United States) Bob Estes	70-69-72-72=283	−5	68,875
T26	(Northern Ireland) Graeme McDowell	72-65-72-74=283	−5	68,875
T26	(United States) Jeff Overton	70-72-70-71=283	−5	68,875
T26	(Australia) Adam Scott (c)	70-68-71-74=283	−5	68,875
T26	(United States) Jimmy Walker	71-69-68-75=283	−5	68,875
T32	(United States) Steve Flesch	71-71-71-71=284	−4	57,475
T32	(United States) Steve Marino	73-67-72-72=284	−4	57,475
T34	(Australia) Greg Chalmers	70-69-70-76=285	−3	49,020
T34	(South Korea) K. J. Choi	69-68-72-76=285	−3	49,020
T34	(United States) Dustin Johnson	71-71-70-73=285	−3	49,020
T34	(Germany) Martin Kaymer	70-71-68-76=285	−3	49,020
T34	(South Korea) Yang Yong-eun	70-68-73-74=285	−3	49,020
T39	(United States) Fred Funk (c)	72-70-66-78=286	−2	38,000
T39	(United States) Bill Haas	68-69-70-79=286	−2	38,000
T39	(Japan) Ryuji Imada	67-66-76-77=286	−2	38,000
T39	(United States) Jerry Kelly	73-66-73-74=286	−2	38,000
T39	(Australia) James Nitties	70-72-72-72=286	−2	38,000
T39	(South Africa) Rory Sabbatini	72-69-71-74=286	−2	38,000
T45	(United States) Kris Blanks	71-71-75-70=287	−1	30,400
T45	(United States) Spencer Levin	71-67-72-77=287	−1	30,400
T47	(United States) Jim Furyk	69-73-73-73=288	E	25,118
T47	(Spain) Sergio García (c)	69-70-71-78=288	E	25,118
T47	(United States) John Merrick	70-72-71-75=288	E	25,118
T47	(United States) Ryan Moore	67-70-71-80=288	E	25,118
T47	(United States) Alex Prugh	69-73-70-76=288	E	25,118
T52	(United States) James Driscoll	71-71-77-70=289	+1	22,277
T52	(United States) Paul Goydos	69-68-71-81=289	+1	22,277
T52	(United States) Justin Leonard (c)	72-68-70-79=289	+1	22,277
T52	(England) Oliver Wilson	70-70-70-79=289	+1	22,277
T56	(United States) Woody Austin	69-72-73-76=290	+2	21,565
T56	(United States) Boo Weekley	69-72-68-81=290	+2	21,565
T58	(Canada) Stephen Ames (c)	70-71-79-71=291	+3	20,805
T58	(Germany) Alex Čejka	69-72-76-74=291	+3	20,805
T58	(United States) J. J. Henry	68-71-77-75=291	+3	20,805
T58	(United States) George McNeill	75-67-72-77=291	+3	20,805
T58	(United States) Brett Quigley	72-69-75-75=291	+3	20,805
T58	(United States) Kevin Stadler	69-70-78-74=291	+3	20,805
T64	(United States) Jason Bohn	67-74-71-80=292	+4	20,045
T64	(United States) Roland Thatcher	71-68-75-78=292	+4	20,045
T66	(United States) Ben Curtis	71-68-75-79=293	+5	19,665
T66	(Spain) Álvaro Quirós	72-70-75-76=293	+5	19,665
68	(United States) Troy Merritt	71-70-76-78=295	+7	19,380
69	(Sweden) Robert Karlsson	71-69-77-79=296	+8	19,190
CUT	(Argentina) Ángel Cabrera	70-73=143	−1	
CUT	(England) Paul Casey	73-70=143	−1	
CUT	(United States) Stewart Cink	73-70=143	−1	
CUT	(England) Brian Davis	72-71=143	−1	
CUT	(United States) J. P. Hayes	74-69=143	−1	
CUT	(Thailand) Thongchai Jaidee	71-72=143	−1	
CUT	(United States) Bryce Molder	71-72=143	−1	
CUT	(United States) Kevin Na	71-72=143	−1	
CUT	(United States) Pat Perez	71-72=143	−1	
CUT	(United States) D. A. Points	73-70=143	−1	
CUT	(England) Ian Poulter	72-71=143	−1	
CUT	(Fiji) Vijay Singh	69-74=143	−1	
CUT	(Sweden) Henrik Stenson (c)	69-74=143	−1	
CUT	(United States) David Toms	71-72=143	−1	
CUT	(Colombia) Camilo Villegas	70-73=143	−1	
CUT	(United States) Michael Allen	74-70=144	E	
CUT	(United States) Chad Campbell	75-69=144	E	
CUT	(England) Ross Fisher	69-75=144	E	
CUT	(United States) Brian Gay	70-74=144	E	
CUT	(United States) Jay Haas	71-73=144	E	
CUT	(United States) Derek Lamely	71-73=144	E	
CUT	(United States) Bill Lunde	70-74=144	E	
CUT	(United States) Scott McCarron	68-76=144	E	
CUT	(Australia) Geoff Ogilvy	72-72=144	E	
CUT	(Australia) Nick O'Hern	71-73=144	E	
CUT	(England) Greg Owen	73-71=144	E	
CUT	(England) Justin Rose	72-72=144	E	
CUT	(United States) Brandt Snedeker	73-71=144	E	
CUT	(United States) Bubba Watson	71-73=144	E	
CUT	(United States) Jason Dufner	73-72=145	+1	
CUT	(South Africa) Ernie Els	74-71=145	+1	
CUT	(United States) Harrison Frazar	71-74=145	+1	
CUT	(Republic of Ireland) Pádraig Harrington	73-72=145	+1	
CUT	(Northern Ireland) Rory McIlroy	73-72=145	+1	
CUT	(United States) Ryan Palmer	73-72=145	+1	
CUT	(Australia) Rod Pampling	74-71=145	+1	
CUT	(United States) Tim Petrovic	75-70=145	+1	
CUT	(United States) Jeff Quinney	72-73=145	+1	
CUT	(United States) Webb Simpson	74-71=145	+1	
CUT	(United States) Kevin Sutherland	74-71=145	+1	
CUT	(United States) Vaughn Taylor	72-73=145	+1	
CUT	(United States) Mark Wilson	71-74=145	+1	
CUT	(United States) Briny Baird	74-72=146	+2	
CUT	(Australia) Jason Day	74-72=146	+2	
CUT	(Australia) Nathan Green	72-74=146	+2	
CUT	(South Africa) Trevor Immelman	71-75=146	+2	
CUT	(United States) Lee Janzen (c)	70-76=146	+2	
CUT	(South Africa) Charl Schwartzel	71-75=146	+2	
CUT	(Australia) John Senden	70-76=146	+2	
CUT	(United States) Nicholas Thompson	73-73=146	+2	
CUT	(United States) D. J. Trahan	72-74=146	+2	
CUT	(Canada) Mike Weir	72-74=146	+2	
CUT	(United States) Ricky Barnes	73-74=147	+3	
CUT	(United States) Cameron Beckman	71-76=147	+3	
CUT	(United States) Mark Calcavecchia	73-74=147	+3	
CUT	(Sweden) Daniel Chopra	78-69=147	+3	
CUT	(Zimbabwe) Brendon de Jonge	70-77=147	+3	
CUT	(United States) Rickie Fowler	73-74=147	+3	
CUT	(Australia) Marc Leishman	74-73=147	+3	
CUT	(South Korea) Charlie Wi	70-77=147	+3	
CUT	(United States) Jonathan Byrd	73-75=148	+4	
CUT	(Scotland) Martin Laird	74-74=148	+4	
CUT	(United States) Michael Letzig	75-73=148	+4	
CUT	(United States) Kevin Streelman	75-73=148	+4	
CUT	(United States) Matt Bettencourt	74-75=149	+5	
CUT	(United States) Michael Bradley	73-76=149	+5	
CUT	(United States) Charles Howell III	76-73=149	+5	
CUT	(Sweden) Richard S. Johnson	76-73=149	+5	
CUT	(United States) John Mallinger	76-73=149	+5	
CUT	(Australia) Aaron Baddeley	72-79=151	+7	
CUT	(United States) Scott Piercy	76-75=151	+7	
CUT	(Australia) Mathew Goggin	72-80=152	+8	
CUT	(United States) Ted Purdy	73-79=152	+8	
CUT	(United States) Jeff Klauk	75-78=153	+9	
CUT	(United States) Chad Collins	75-79=154	+10	
WD	(United States) Tiger Woods (c)	70-71-71=212	−4	

==== Scorecard ====
Hole	1	2	3	4	5	6	7	8	9	10	11	12	13	14	15	16	17	18
Par	4	5	3	4	4	4	4	3	5	4	5	4	3	4	4	5	3	4
(South Africa) Clark	−11	−11	−11	−11	−11	−11	−12	−12	−13	−14	−15	−16	−16	−16	−16	−16	−16	−16
(Australia) Allenby	−12	−14	−14	−15	−15	−14	−14	−14	−14	−13	−14	−14	−13	−14	−14	−15	−15	−15
(United States) Glover	−12	−11	−11	−10	−9	−8	−9	−9	−9	−9	−10	−11	−11	−11	−12	−13	−14	−14
(United States) Crane	−11	−11	−11	−12	−12	−12	−12	−12	−12	−12	−12	−12	−12	−12	−12	−12	−12	−12
(United States) Love	−7	−8	−8	−8	−8	−8	−9	−8	−9	−9	−10	−9	−9	−10	−9	−11	−12	−12
(United States) Slocum	−11	−11	−11	−11	−10	−10	−9	−9	−10	−9	−9	−9	−10	−11	−11	−12	−12	−12
(United States) Van Pelt	−10	−10	−9	−10	−10	−11	−10	−9	−9	−9	−10	−11	−11	−11	−11	−12	−12	−12
(England) Westwood	−13	−14	−14	−14	−15	−15	−15	−15	−15	−15	−15	−15	−15	−14	−14	−14	−12	−12

Cumulative tournament scores, relative to par

Eagle	Birdie	Bogey	Double bogey
