= Brian Stuard =

American professional golfer (born 1982)

Personal information
- Full name: Brian Glen Stuard
- Nationality: United States
- Born: December 10, 1982 (age 43) Jackson, Michigan, U.S.
- Height: 5 ft 10 in (1.78 m)
- Weight: 165 lb (75 kg; 11.8 st)

Career
- Sport: Golf
- College: Oakland University
- Turned professional: 2005
- Current tour: PGA Tour
- Former tours: Web.com Tour; NGA Hooters Tour
- Professional wins: 1

Number of wins by tour
- PGA Tour: 1

Best results in major championships
- Masters Tournament: T36: 2017
- PGA Championship: T79: 2016
- U.S. Open: T65: 2019
- The Open Championship: DNP

Brian Glen Stuard (born December 10, 1982) is an American professional golfer. He is currently playing on the PGA Tour.

== Early life and amateur career ==
Born and raised in Jackson, Michigan, Stuard graduated from Napoleon High School in 2001. He played college golf at Oakland University in Rochester, Michigan, then in the Mid-Continent Conference, and earned a bachelor's degree in management in 2005.

== Professional career ==
In 2005, Stuard turned professional. He played on the NGA Hooters Tour in 2006 and 2007. He has played on the Nationwide Tour since 2008. He finished tied for 19th at the 2009 PGA Tour Qualifying School to earn his PGA Tour card for 2010. On the PGA Tour in 2010, he played in 28 events and made 13 cuts. His best finish was a tie for second at the Mayakoba Golf Classic at Riviera Maya-Cancun. He finished 154th on the money list and returned to the Nationwide Tour in 2011.

Stuard regained his PGA Tour card after graduating from the Web.com Tour in 2012.

In 2015, he finished 128th in the FedEx Cup points list, meaning that he would have only conditional status on Tour in 2016. However, he got his first career PGA Tour victory in May 2016 at the Zurich Classic of New Orleans, his 120th PGA Tour start, to regain full status until 2018. Stuard went bogey-free in the rain-shortened event. He also moved from 513th to 143rd in the world rankings.

== Professional wins (1) ==
=== PGA Tour wins (1) ===
| No. | Date | Tournament | Winning score | To par | Margin of victory | Runners-up |
|---|---|---|---|---|---|---|
| 1 | May 2, 2016 | Zurich Classic of New Orleans | 64-68-69=201 (Note: Shortened to 54 holes due to weather.) | −15 | Playoff | (South Korea) An Byeong-hun, (United States) Jamie Lovemark |

PGA Tour playoff record (1–0)

| No. | Year | Tournament | Opponents | Result |
|---|---|---|---|---|
| 1 | 2016 | Zurich Classic of New Orleans | (South Korea) An Byeong-hun, (United States) Jamie Lovemark | Won with birdie on second extra hole An eliminated by par on first hole |

== Results in major championships ==
Results not in chronological order in 2020.

| Tournament | 2013 | 2014 | 2015 | 2016 | 2017 | 2018 |
|---|---|---|---|---|---|---|
| Masters Tournament | | | | | T36 | |
| U.S. Open | CUT | CUT | | | CUT | CUT |
| The Open Championship | | | | | | |
| PGA Championship | | CUT | | T79 | | |

| Tournament | 2019 | 2020 | 2021 | 2022 |
|---|---|---|---|---|
| Masters Tournament | | | | |
| PGA Championship | | CUT | | |
| U.S. Open | T65 | | CUT | CUT |
| The Open Championship | | NT | | |

Did not play

CUT = missed the half-way cut
"T" = tied for place
NT = no tournament due to COVID-19 pandemic

== Results in The Players Championship ==
| Tournament | 2013 | 2014 | 2015 | 2016 | 2017 | 2018 | 2019 | 2020 | 2021 | 2022 |
|---|---|---|---|---|---|---|---|---|---|---|
| The Players Championship | CUT | T17 | CUT | CUT | T75 | | CUT | C | T58 | CUT |

Did not play

CUT = missed the halfway cut
"T" indicates a tie for a place
C = Canceled after the first round due to the COVID-19 pandemic

== Results in World Golf Championships ==
| Tournament | 2016 |
|---|---|
| Championship | |
| Match Play | |
| Invitational | T16 |
| Champions | |

Did not play

"T" = Tied

== See also ==
- 2009 PGA Tour Qualifying School graduates
- 2012 Web.com Tour graduates
- 2022 Korn Ferry Tour Finals graduates
