= Alex Aragon =

American professional golfer (born 1979)

Personal information
- Nationality: United States
- Born: March 11, 1979 (age 47) Mexico City, Mexico
- Height: 6 ft 0 in (1.83 m)
- Weight: 185 lb (84 kg; 13.2 st)

Career
- Sport: Golf
- College: Stanford University
- Status: 2001
- Current tour: Web.com Tour
- Former tour: PGA Tour
- Professional wins: 2

Number of wins by tour
- Korn Ferry Tour: 2

Alex Aragon (born March 11, 1979) is an American professional golfer.

== Early life and amateur career ==
Aragon was born in Mexico City, Mexico. He played college golf at Stanford University.

== Professional career ==
In 2001, Aragon turned professional. He played on the Web.com Tour in 2005, 2009, and 2012–2013. He won his first tournament in 2012 at the TPC Stonebrae Championship. He won his second tournament at the 2013 WNB Golf Classic.

Aragon played on the PGA Tour in 2006 where his best finish was T-27 at the 84 Lumber Classic. He has also played on mini-tours, including the Tight Lies Tour in 2003 and the Gateway Tour in 2004. He finished ninth on the 2013 Web.com Tour regular season money list to earn his 2014 PGA Tour card. In 2013–14, he made only 2 cuts in 18 events and finished 252nd on the FedEx Cup points list and lost his PGA Tour card.

== Professional wins (2) ==
=== Web.com Tour wins (2) ===
No.	Date	Tournament	Winning score	Margin of victory	Runner(s)-up
1	Apr 15, 2012	TPC Stonebrae Championship	−10 (67-70-67-66=270)	1 stroke	(United States) Paul Haley II, (United States) Matt Harmon, (United States) Duffy Waldorf
2	Apr 14, 2013	WNB Golf Classic	−16 (71-69-66-66=272)	1 stroke	(United States) Byron Smith

== See also ==
- 2005 PGA Tour Qualifying School graduates
- 2013 Web.com Tour Finals graduates
