= Michael Connell (golfer) =

American professional golfer (born 1975)

Personal information
- Nationality: United States
- Born: July 2, 1975 (age 51) Dallas, Texas, U.S.
- Height: 6 ft 1 in (1.85 m)
- Weight: 195 lb (88 kg; 13.9 st)

Career
- Sport: Golf
- College: University of Texas at San Antonio; Mississippi State University
- Turned professional: 1998
- Former tours: PGA Tour; Web.com Tour; NGA Hooters Tour
- Professional wins: 5

Michael Connell (born July 2, 1975) is an American professional golfer.

== Professional career ==
In 1998, Connell turned professional. He spent many years playing on a variety of mini-tours. He won five tournaments on the NGA Hooters Tour, and he was awarded player of the year in 2002. In 2006, he finally earned his PGA Tour card through qualifying school, but lost it at the end of that season. He returned to the Tour via the qualifying school once more in 2009, and enjoyed more success in 2010, finishing 115th in the money list to retain his playing status.

== Professional wins (5) ==
=== NGA Hooters Tour wins (5) ===
No.	Date	Tournament	Winning score	Margin of victory	Runner(s)-up
1	Jun 13, 1999	Delta Pontiac Performers Classic	−31 (66-61-64-66=257)	4 strokes	(United States) Bobby Elliott
2	Jun 20, 1999	Station Casino Classic	−20 (65-69-66-68=268)	4 strokes	(United States) Jean-Paul Hebert, (United States) Zoran Zorkic
3	Mar 24, 2002	Eagle Bluff Championship	−22 (69-69-63-65=266)	9 strokes	(United States) Bill Lunde
4	May 4, 2002	Club at North Creek	−20 (66-66-64=196) (Note: Shortened to 54 holes due to weather.)	Playoff	(United States) Mark Side
5	Apr 29, 2007	Savannah Lakes Resort Classic	−17 (70-67-70-64=271)	1 stroke	(United States) Emmett Turner

== See also ==
- 2005 PGA Tour Qualifying School graduates
- 2009 PGA Tour Qualifying School graduates
