= Tim Clark (golfer) =

South African professional golfer (born 1975)

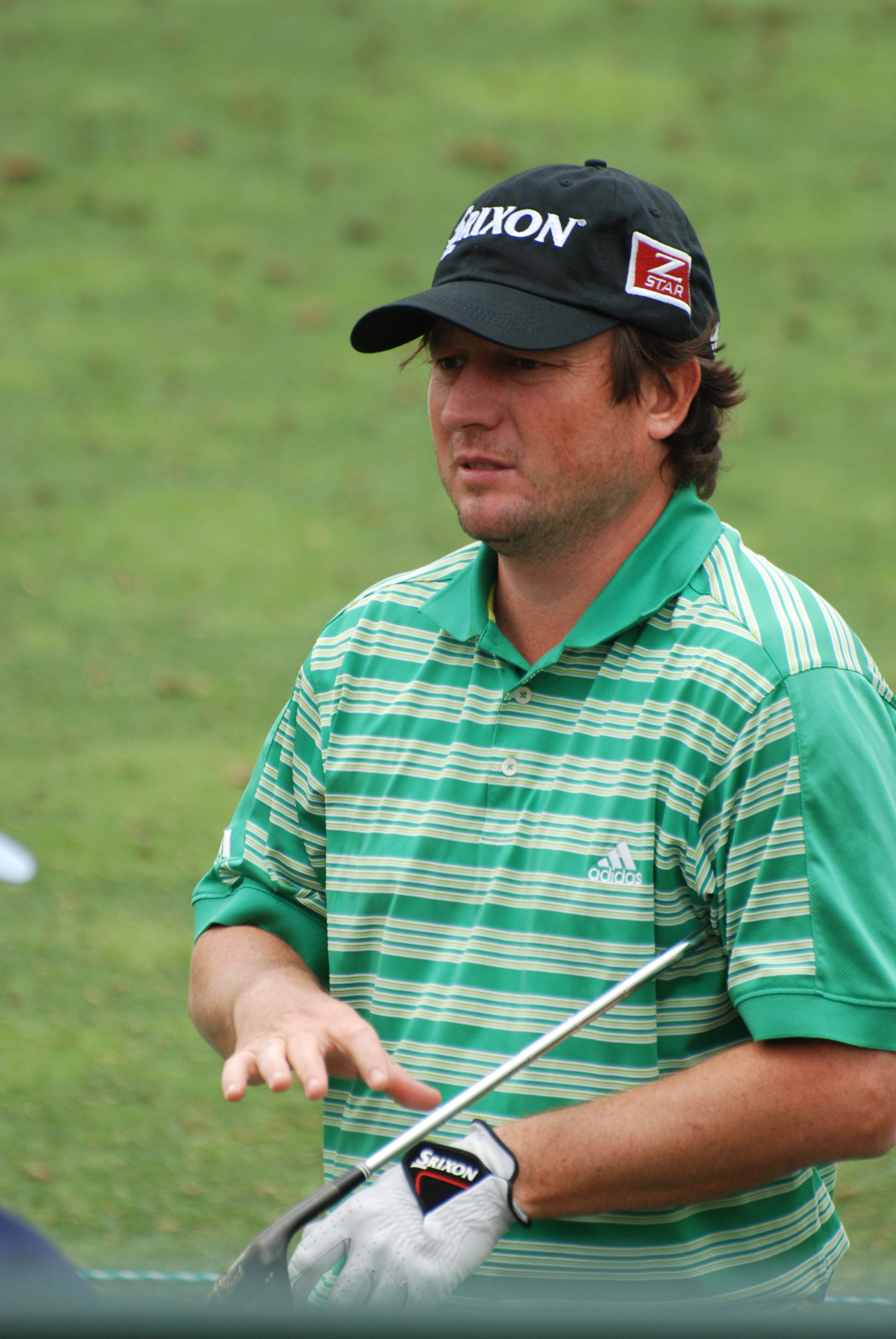
- Clark at the 2009 U.S. Open

Personal information
- Full name: Timothy Henry Clark
- Nickname: Penguin
- Nationality: South Africa
- Born: 17 December 1975 (age 50) Durban, South Africa
- Height: 5 ft 7 in (1.70 m)
- Weight: 165 lb (75 kg; 11.8 st)
- Spouse: Candice
- Children: 2

Career
- Sport: Golf
- College: North Carolina State University
- Turned professional: 1998
- Former tours: European Tour; PGA Tour; Sunshine Tour
- Professional wins: 12
- Highest ranking: 14 (16 April 2006)

Number of wins by tour
- PGA Tour: 2
- European Tour: 3
- Sunshine Tour: 2
- PGA Tour of Australasia: 1
- Korn Ferry Tour: 2
- Other: 2

Best results in major championships
- Masters Tournament: 2nd: 2006
- PGA Championship: 3rd: 2003
- U.S. Open: T3: 2005
- The Open Championship: T23: 2005

Achievements and awards
- Sunshine Tour Order of Merit winner: 2001–02

Timothy Henry Clark (born 17 December 1975) is a South African professional golfer who formerly played on the PGA Tour. His biggest win was The Players Championship in 2010, which was also his first PGA Tour win.

== Early life and amateur career ==
Clark was born in Durban, South Africa. He took up golf at the age of three and was taught to play by his father. He attended North Carolina State University in the United States, where he had a successful college golf career, winning ACC Player of the Year in 1997. During this time he won the 1997 U.S. Amateur Public Links to qualify for his first major, the 1998 Masters Tournament.

== Professional career ==
Clark turned professional in 1998, and initially played on the second tier U.S. professional tour, which was then known as the Nike Tour, where he won two tournaments in 2000 to gain membership of the main PGA Tour for 2001. His 2001 campaign was cut short by a wrist injury after just three events. He made a comeback in 2002, and had the benefit of a major medical exemption which enabled him to enter enough events to comfortably regain full exemption for 2003. He captured his first PGA Tour victory at the 2010 Players Championship, becoming only the second golfer to make the Players his first Tour victory. He has had three European Tour victories. He finished sole second at the 2006 Masters Tournament and sole or tied third at the 2003 PGA Championship and the 2005 U.S. Open.

Clark was a member of the International Team, captained by fellow South African Gary Player in two of three appearances, in the 2003, 2005 and 2009 Presidents Cup. Player dubbed him the team's "bull dog" in reference to his dogged determination and refusal to give in or let go. In 2005 he reached the top 20 of the Official World Golf Rankings for the first time. He won the Sunshine Tour Order of Merit in the 2001/02 season. He has played Gary Player's annual charity event in South Africa to help raise funds for needy children and personally paid for a little girl's cochlear ear implant so that she could hear after winning the event in 2005. In Australia for a three-tournament swing, he won the 2008 Australian Open in a playoff with Mathew Goggin when they were both tied at 9-under-par. Neither seemed to have a chance with four holes to play when David Smail led at 12-under only to double-bogey the next two holes.

In May 2009, Clark nearly had his first PGA Tour victory in hand at the Crowne Plaza Invitational at Colonial, but he bogeyed the 18th hole to force a playoff. On the first hole of that playoff, he missed a 7-footer which would have given him the victory. Then, on the second playoff hole, he and Steve Marino lost to Steve Stricker. In May 2010, Clark picked up his first PGA Tour title in his 206th start, after eight runner-up finishes, at the 2010 Players Championship. Clark came from three behind with a final round 67 to win by a stroke over Robert Allenby. At the time, Clark was the highest-earning player without a win, earning $14.7 million and having eight runner-up finishes.

On 11 August 2013, in the final round of the PGA Championship at Oak Hill Country Club, Clark made a hole-in-one on the 220-yard, par-3 11th hole. On 27 July 2014, Clark won the RBC Canadian Open, finishing one stroke ahead of Jim Furyk. This was his second PGA Tour title and first victory in more than four years. He birdied five out of the last eight holes to come from three strokes back in the final round. The win moved Clark back inside the world's top 100.

A left elbow injury hampered Clark for much of 2015 and 2016. Clark last played the 2016 CareerBuilder Challenge and has a career money list exemption available. His career earnings are over $23.9 million.

== Professional wins (12) ==
=== PGA Tour wins (2) ===
Legend
Players Championships (1)
Other PGA Tour (1)

No.	Date	Tournament	Winning score	Margin of victory	Runner-up
1	9 May 2010	The Players Championship	−16 (68-71-66-67=272)	1 stroke	(Australia) Robert Allenby
2	27 Jul 2014	RBC Canadian Open	−17 (67-67-64-65=263)	1 stroke	(United States) Jim Furyk

PGA Tour playoff record (0–2)

No.	Year	Tournament	Opponent(s)	Result
1	2009	Crowne Plaza Invitational at Colonial	(United States) Steve Marino, (United States) Steve Stricker	Stricker won with birdie on second extra hole
2	2014	WGC-HSBC Champions	(United States) Bubba Watson	Lost to birdie on first extra hole

=== European Tour wins (3) ===
No.	Date	Tournament	Winning score	Margin of victory	Runner(s)-up
1	13 Jan 2002	Bell's South African Open^{1}	−19 (66-70-68-65=269)	2 strokes	(England) Steve Webster
2	23 Jan 2005	South African Airways Open^{1} (2)	−15 (68-71-68-66=273)	6 strokes	(France) Grégory Havret, (South Africa) Charl Schwartzel
3	10 Jul 2005	Barclays Scottish Open	−19 (67-66-65-67=265)	2 strokes	(Northern Ireland) Darren Clarke, (Netherlands) Maarten Lafeber

^{1}Co-sanctioned by the Sunshine Tour

European Tour playoff record (0–2)

No.	Year	Tournament	Opponent	Result
1	2003	South African Airways Open	(South Africa) Trevor Immelman	Lost to birdie on first extra hole
2	2014	WGC-HSBC Champions	(United States) Bubba Watson	Lost to birdie on first extra hole

=== Sunshine Tour wins (2) ===
Legend
Flagship events (2)
Other Sunshine Tour (0)

No.	Date	Tournament	Winning score	Margin of victory	Runner(s)-up
1	13 Jan 2002	Bell's South African Open^{1}	−19 (66-70-68-65=269)	2 strokes	(England) Steve Webster
2	23 Jan 2005	South African Airways Open^{1} (2)	−15 (68-71-68-66=273)	6 strokes	(France) Grégory Havret, (South Africa) Charl Schwartzel

^{1}Co-sanctioned by the European Tour

Sunshine Tour playoff record (0–1)

No.	Year	Tournament	Opponent	Result
1	2003	South African Airways Open	(South Africa) Trevor Immelman	Lost to birdie on first extra hole

=== PGA Tour of Australasia wins (1) ===
Legend
Flagship events (1)
Other PGA Tour of Australasia (0)

No.	Date	Tournament	Winning score	Margin of victory	Runner-up
1	14 Dec 2008	Australian Open	−9 (70-73-69-67=279)	Playoff	(Australia) Mathew Goggin

PGA Tour of Australasia playoff record (1–0)

No.	Year	Tournament	Opponent	Result
1	2008	Australian Open	(Australia) Mathew Goggin	Won with par on first extra hole

=== Buy.com Tour wins (2) ===
No.	Date	Tournament	Winning score	Margin of victory	Runner(s)-up
1	12 Aug 2000	Buy.com Fort Smith Classic	−16 (67-66-65-66=264)	3 strokes	(United States) Lee Rinker
2	17 Sep 2000	Buy.com Boise Open	−15 (66-67-69-67=269)	6 strokes	(United States) Patrick Burke, (United States) Steve Haskins

=== Canadian Tour wins (2) ===
No.	Date	Tournament	Winning score	Margin of victory	Runner-up
1	16 Aug 1998	New Brunswick Open	−27 (63-67-67-64=261)	1 stroke	(Australia) David McKenzie
2	23 Aug 1998	CPGA Championship	−16 (71-70-62-69=272)	Playoff	(United States) Chris Tidland

=== Other wins (2) ===
No.	Date	Tournament	Winning score	Margin of victory	Runners-up
1	27 Nov 2005	Nelson Mandela Invitational (with (South Africa) Vincent Tshabalala)	−17 (63-64=127)	4 strokes	(South Africa) Trevor Immelman and (South Africa) Gary Player
2	20 Jun 2006	CVS/pharmacy Charity Classic (with (Zimbabwe) Nick Price)	−19 (61-62=123)	Playoff	(United States) Brad Faxon and (Canada) Mike Weir

Other playoff record (1–0)

No.	Year	Tournament	Opponents	Result
1	2006	CVS/pharmacy Charity Classic (with (Zimbabwe) Nick Price)	(United States) Brad Faxon and (Canada) Mike Weir	Won with birdie on second extra hole

== Results in major championships ==
Tournament	1998	1999
Masters Tournament	CUT	
U.S. Open		
The Open Championship		
PGA Championship		

Tournament	2000	2001	2002	2003	2004	2005	2006	2007	2008	2009
Masters Tournament				T13	CUT	T39	2	T13	CUT	T13
U.S. Open				CUT	T13	T3	CUT	T17	T48	T40
The Open Championship			CUT		CUT	T23	T56		CUT	CUT
PGA Championship			T53	3	CUT	T17	T24	CUT	T55	T16

Tournament	2010	2011	2012	2013	2014	2015
Masters Tournament	CUT	CUT	CUT	T11	CUT	
U.S. Open	T12		CUT	CUT		
The Open Championship	CUT		CUT	T44		
PGA Championship	T39		T11	T68	CUT	CUT

Top 10
Did not play

CUT = missed the half way cut
"T" indicates a tie for a place.

=== Summary ===
Tournament	Wins	2nd	3rd	Top-5	Top-10	Top-25	Events	Cuts made
Masters Tournament	0	1	0	1	1	5	13	6
U.S. Open	0	0	1	1	1	4	10	6
The Open Championship	0	0	0	0	0	1	9	3
PGA Championship	0	0	1	1	1	5	13	9
Totals	0	1	2	3	3	15	45	24

- Most consecutive cuts made – 5 (2005 Masters – 2006 Masters)
- Longest streak of top-10s – 1 (three times)

== The Players Championship ==
=== Wins (1) ===
Year	Championship	54 holes	Winning score	Margin	Runner-up
2010	The Players Championship	3 shot deficit	−16 (68-71-66-67=272)	1 stroke	(Australia) Robert Allenby

=== Results timeline ===
Tournament	2003	2004	2005	2006	2007	2008	2009	2010	2011	2012	2013	2014
The Players Championship	T21	CUT	CUT	CUT	T68	CUT	T9	1	WD	T25	CUT	CUT

Win
Top 10

CUT = missed the halfway cut
WD = withdrew
"T" indicates a tie for a place.

== Results in World Golf Championships ==
Tournament	2002	2003	2004	2005	2006	2007	2008	2009	2010	2011	2012	2013	2014
Match Play		R64		R64	R64	R32	R64	R16	R16			R16	
Championship	62			T18	T26	T63	T12	27	T22			T60	
Invitational		T64	T48	T51	74	T6	T20	T29	T58				T50
Champions									T25				2

Top 10
Did not play

QF, R16, R32, R64 = Round in which player lost in match play
"T" = tied
Note that the HSBC Champions did not become a WGC event until 2009.

== Team appearances ==
Amateur

- Eisenhower Trophy (representing South Africa): 1994

Professional

- World Cup (representing South Africa): 2002, 2005
- Presidents Cup (International Team): 2003 (tie), 2005, 2009

== See also ==
- 2000 Buy.com Tour graduates
