= Jeff Overton =

American professional golfer (born 1983)

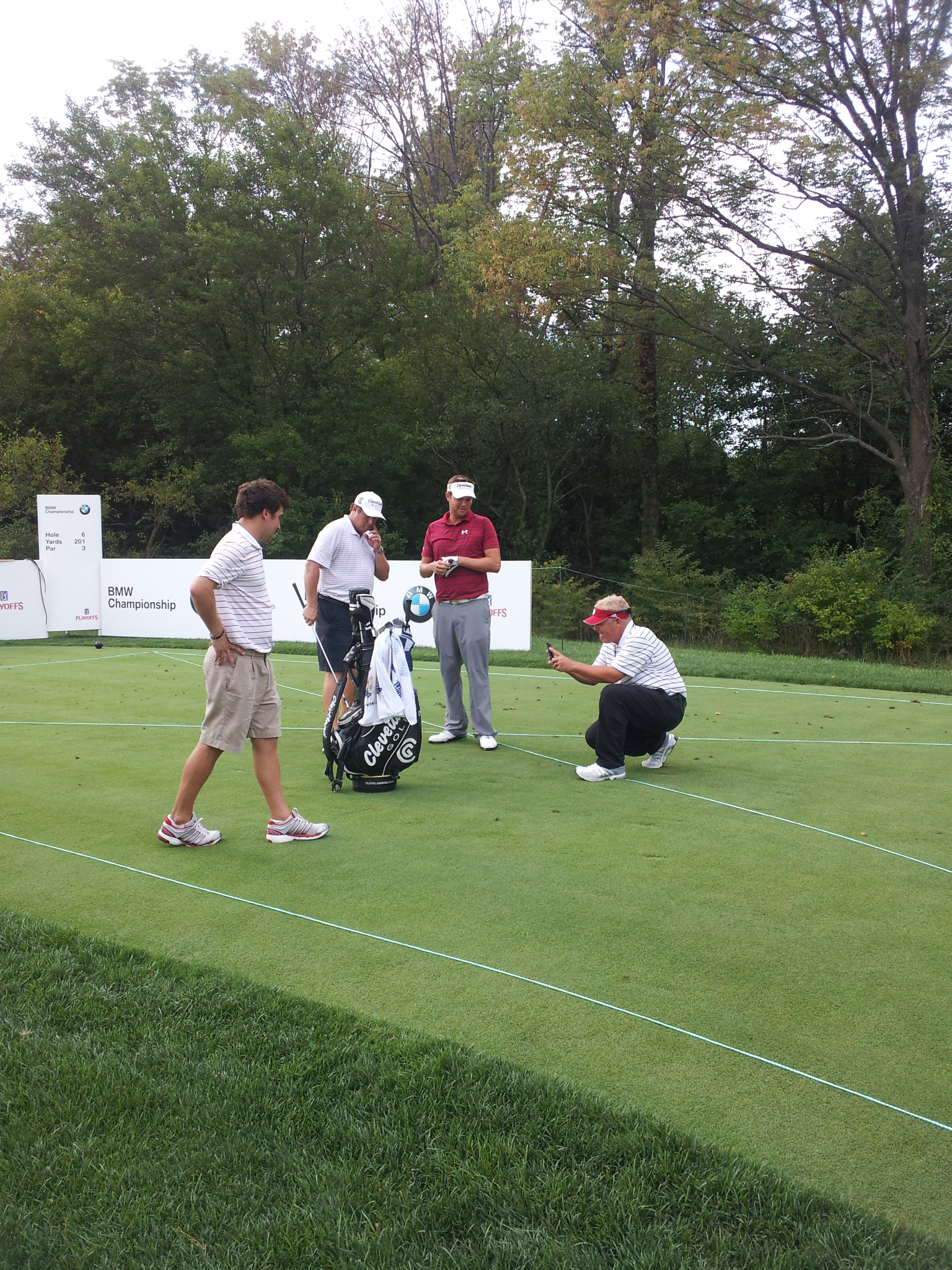
- Overton at the 2012 BMW Championship

Personal information
- Full name: Jeffrey Laurence Overton
- Nationality: United States
- Born: May 28, 1983 (age 43) Evansville, Indiana, U.S.
- Height: 6 ft 4 in (1.93 m)
- Weight: 195 lb (88 kg; 13.9 st)

Career
- Sport: Golf
- College: Indiana University
- Turned professional: 2005
- Current tour: Korn Ferry Tour
- Former tour: PGA Tour
- Highest ranking: 45 (August 8, 2010)

Best results in major championships
- Masters Tournament: T44: 2011
- PGA Championship: T32: 2009
- U.S. Open: T63: 2011
- The Open Championship: T11: 2010

Jeffrey Laurence Overton (born May 28, 1983) is an American professional golfer.

== Early life and amateur career ==
In 1983, Overton was born in Evansville, Indiana. His father was a star quarterback at Evansville Harrison High School and for the Indiana State Sycamores.

He attended and graduated from Evansville North High School, leading the Huskies to two State Golf Finals; he finished as State Runner-Up in 1999 (as a sophomore) and then led the Huskies to the State Championship in 2000 as a Junior.

He attended Indiana University, graduating in 2005 with a degree in Sports Marketing and Management.

== Professional career ==
In 2005, Overton turned pro. He is currently a member of the PGA Tour. He graduated from 2005 PGA Tour Qualifying School in his first attempt and started to play on the Tour in 2006.

In 2006, he scored a double eagle on the 18th hole at Westchester Country Club during the Barclays Classic as he holed a fairway wood from 239 yards after a 294-yard drive. In 2007, he recorded his best finish, a second-place finish at the Wyndham Championship. During the final PGA Tour event of 2008, the Children's Miracle Network Classic, Overton was ten days removed from an appendectomy and was ranked 125th, barely hanging on to a full-season exemption. A 21st-place finish moved him up to 118th and he retained his card for 2009. In 2009, he improved to 76th.

The following season, 2010, was his best season. He recorded three runner-up finishes that season: at the Zurich Classic of New Orleans, at the HP Byron Nelson Championship, and the Greenbrier Classic. At the Greenbrier, he held a three-shot lead after 54 holes but could not withstand an amazing 4th round by Stuart Appleby, who shot a round of 59 to win his 9th PGA Tour event. Following this tournament, Overton reached the top 50 of the Official World Golf Ranking for the first time. He also recorded two third-place finishes and an 11th-place finish at the 2010 Open Championship. He ended 2010 in 12th place on the PGA Tour money list. His strong 2010 season earned him a place on the United States Ryder Cup team; he and teammate Rickie Fowler became the first Americans to make the team without a victory on the PGA Tour.

In 2015, Overton barely retained his PGA Tour card, finishing 125th in the FedEx Cup.

Having suffered a serious infection after back surgery in 2017, Overton did not start a world ranking event again until the 2022 3M Open.

== Amateur wins ==
- 2003 Indiana Amateur
- 2004 Indiana Amateur
- 2001–05 seven collegiate events
- 2005 Big Ten Conference Champion

== Results in major championships ==
Tournament	2008	2009	2010	2011	2012
Masters Tournament				T44	
U.S. Open				T63	
The Open Championship	T70	T13	T11	T38	
PGA Championship		T32	71	CUT	CUT

Did not play

CUT = Missed the half-way cut
"T" = tied

== Results in The Players Championship ==
Tournament	2008	2009	2010	2011	2012	2013	2014	2015	2016
The Players Championship	CUT	T37	T26	T26	CUT	T26	82	CUT	CUT

CUT = missed the halfway cut
"T" indicates a tie for a place

== Results in World Golf Championships ==
Tournament	2010	2011
Match Play		R64
Championship		66
Invitational	T6	T68
Champions		

Top 10
Did not play

QF, R16, R32, R64 = Round in which player lost in match play
"T" = Tied

== U.S. national team appearances ==
Amateur

- Palmer Cup: 2005 (winners)
- Walker Cup: 2005 (winners)

Professional

- Ryder Cup: 2010

== See also ==
- 2005 PGA Tour Qualifying School graduates
