= Billy Hurley III =

American professional golfer (born 1982)

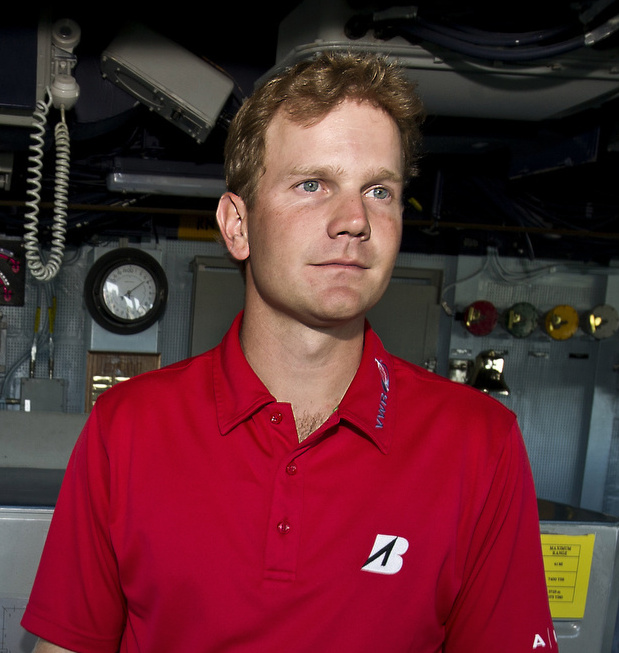
- Hurley aboard the USS Chung-Hoon (DDG-93)

Personal information
- Full name: Willard Jeremiah Hurley III
- Nationality: United States
- Born: June 9, 1982 (age 44) Leesburg, Virginia, U.S.
- Height: 5 ft 10 in (1.78 m)
- Weight: 170 lb (77 kg; 12 st)
- Spouse: Heather Hurley
- Children: 3

Career
- Sport: Golf
- College: United States Naval Academy
- Turned professional: 2006
- Former tours: PGA Tour; Web.com Tour; Tarheel Tour
- Professional wins: 3

Number of wins by tour
- PGA Tour: 1
- Other: 2

Best results in major championships
- Masters Tournament: CUT: 2017
- PGA Championship: T22: 2016
- U.S. Open: T48: 2014
- The Open Championship: T64: 2014

Willard Jeremiah "Billy" Hurley III (born June 9, 1982) is an American professional golfer who played on the PGA Tour.

== Early life ==
Hurley grew up in Leesburg, Virginia, the oldest of four children of Bill and Cheryl Hurley. Hurley attended Loudoun County High School. During his senior year in 2000, he was one of 17 golfers named honorable mention All-Met, referring to one of the top golfers in the Washington, D.C. metro area. He also was named all-state in Virginia.

Hurley is a 2004 graduate of the United States Naval Academy, where he earned a bachelor's degree in Quantitative Economics. He also was named Academic All-American.

He was commissioned an ensign in the United States Navy in 2004, rising to the rank of lieutenant and serving until July 2009. After his graduation from the academy, he was assigned to the USS Gettysburg, a guided-missile cruiser based in Mayport, Florida, where he was a combat electronic division officer. He then taught economics for two years at the Naval Academy. From 2007 to 2009, he served a tour of duty in the Persian Gulf aboard the destroyer USS Chung-Hoon.

== Amateur career ==
As an amateur, Hurley was a member of the victorious American team in the 2005 Walker Cup, held at the Chicago Golf Club. The Walker Cup is a competition held biennially that matches the top American amateurs against the best of Great Britain and Ireland. He was also captain of the 2004 Palmer Cup team, an annual competition named for Arnold Palmer that matches American collegiate golfers against European college/university players.

Hurley won seven collegiate golf titles at Navy, was named 2004 Patriot League Player of the Year, and earned the award for the top college golfer and sportsman (the Byron Nelson Award). He was ranked the sixth-best amateur in the world.

== Professional career ==
On the 2011 Nationwide Tour, Hurley's best finish was second place at the Chiquita Classic while having four top-10 finishes. He entered the 2011 Nationwide Tour Championship in the 25th money list position and his T18 position earned him his PGA Tour card.

Hurley played 27 events on the 2012 PGA Tour, with his best finish a tie for fourth at the AT&T National. He finished 150th in the FedEx Cup, earning a $32,000 bonus. However, Hurley finished 151st on the money list and therefore he missed conditional status on the 2013 PGA Tour by $165.

At 2012 Q School, Hurley finished tied for 73rd place. Since at Q School, the top 25 players and ties earn PGA Tour cards and the next 50 players earn Web.com Tour cards, Hurley earned a Web.com Tour card for the 2013 Web.com Tour season. He made 15 cuts in 24 events on the Web.com Tour in 2013 with his best finish a playoff loss at the United Leasing Championship. He played in the Web.com Tour Finals and finished 26th to earn his PGA Tour card for 2014.

Hurley began the 2013–14 season with a tie for ninth place at the October 2013 Frys.com Open in San Martin, California.

On March 2, 2014 Hurley recorded the fourth top-10 of his PGA Tour career with a fifth-place finish at The Honda Classic in Palm Beach Gardens, Florida, just one shot out of the four-man playoff won by Russell Henley. He earned $240,000, moving him to 65th on the 2014 money list with $440,551. After a stretch of several mediocre tournaments and missed cuts, on May 18 he finished T-16 in the HP Byron Nelson Championship, earning $100,050. He continued his strong play with a T-30 to earn $37,200 at the Crowne Plaza Invitational at Colonial on May 25 followed by a T-37 to earn $25,420 at the Memorial Tournament on June 1.

On the following day, June 2, Hurley qualified to play in his first-ever U.S. Open (and first major) as he birdied three of his last four holes to finish in the top four of the 36-hole Monday qualifying tournament held in Rockville, Maryland. At the U.S. Open at Pinehurst No. 2, out of 156 golfers entered, Hurley was one of only 67 to make the cut and play through the weekend. He finished the tournament T-48.

Hurley posted another top 10 on June 29, finishing T-8 at the Quicken Loans National at Congressional Country Club to earn $188,500.

On July 6, 2014, Hurley, on the strength of a second-round 63 and a third-round 67, took a two-shot lead into the final round of the Greenbrier Classic held at The Old White TPC course in White Sulphur Springs, West Virginia. He shot a final-round 73 to finish T-4 and earn $227,036, which put him over the $1 million mark in 2014 earnings at $1,105,659. The T-4 finish combined with his world ranking also qualified him to play in his second major, The Open Championship July 17–20 at Royal Liverpool Golf Club, Hoylake. At The Open, he again made the cut in a major and finished the tournament T-64.

Taking three weeks off following The Open Championship, Hurley missed the cut in his next two tournaments, then his 2014 season ended with a T-57 finish at the Deutsche Bank Championship. He finished the season with career-high winnings of $1,145,299 with 17 cuts made in 26 starts.

Hurley missed the cut by one shot in each of his first two tournaments of the 2014–15 season. In his third tournament, he held a two-stroke lead after 36 holes in the CIMB Classic after consecutive rounds of five-under-par. He finished T-8 to win $189,000. After missing four cuts in his first six events of calendar year 2015, he had his best tournament of the calendar year March 15 at the Valspar Championship, finishing T-17 and winning $77,206.

After his strong finish at the Valspar Championship, Hurley struggled, missing the cut at four of his next five tournaments. In June he finished at T-18 in the FedEx St. Jude Classic and tallied his only other top-25 finish on August 9 at the Barracuda Championship. For the 2015 season, through August 23, he had played in 28 events, making the cut in 14 and earning $591,450.

Because Hurley did not finish the season ranked in the top 125 players (he was ranked 136th) on the PGA Tour after the Wyndham Championship, in which he missed the cut, he lost his PGA Tour playing card for the 2015–16 season. He played in the Web.com Tour Finals but did not regain his PGA Tour card and started the 2015–16 season with conditional status.

Playing a combination of PGA Tour and Web.com Tour events, through 11 PGA Tour events he made five cuts and totaled $80,707 in winnings on that tour. His highest finish to that point was T-41; he missed the cut in the U.S. Open. However, on June 26 he earned his first victory on the PGA Tour at the Quicken Loans National, his 105th PGA Tour event. He was 198th in the FedEx Cup and 607th in the world rankings and was playing in the tournament on a sponsor's exemption. By winning the tournament, he qualified for the 2016 Open Championship; however, he skipped the event to attend his sister's wedding.

He attained his best-ever showing in a major tournament on July 31, 2016 by finishing T-22 at the 2016 PGA Championship at Baltusrol Golf Club.

On September 5, 2016 he posted his second top-10 finish of the season with a T-8 at the Deutsche Bank Championship, earning $212,500. Heading into the tournament he was ranked 77th in the FedEx Cup standings and needed a good showing to finish in the FedEx Cup standings' top 70 and continue on to the next tournament, which he attained, ending the tournament 51st in FedEx Cup points.

For the season, Hurley ended up with one win and earnings of $1,770,400, good for 55th place.

After finishing T-51 in the CIMB Classic to begin the new season, Hurley fired a 13-under to finish T-15 in the Shriners Hospitals for Children Open in Las Vegas to earn $92,840. During the January 2017 Hawaii swing of the PGA Tour, he finished 29th to win $64,000 in the SBS Tournament of Champions followed by a T-20 in the Sony Open in Hawaii, earning $62,571. Playing in the Masters Tournament for the first time, he missed the cut by one shot. In The Players Championship, he finished T-41 to earn $36,750. On May 7, he got his first top-10 of the year with a T-8 at the Wells Fargo Championship to earn $210,000.

Hurley struggled in the second half of the season; in his last seven tournaments, he missed the cut five times along with finishes of 63rd and 68th. He ended 146th on the PGA Tour money list.

Hurley posted a T-25 finish on October 29, 2017 at the Sanderson Farms Championship, winning $33,540, in what was his best finish of the season. In 27 events played during the 2017–18 season, he missed the cut 19 times. He ended the season ranked 201st in the FedEx Cup standings after a T-41 in the Wyndham Championship on August 19, his third-best finish after a T-34 at the Barbasol Championship on July 22.

This was his final year for the tournament exemption gained from his win in the 2016 Quicken Loans Invitational. Hurley's finish meant he only had past champion status for the 2018–19 season.

In February 2018 Hurley ran for president of the PGA Tour's Players Advisory Council, but he was defeated by Jordan Spieth.

Hurley played in the PGA Tour 2018 Sanderson Farms Championship Oct. 25-28, finishing T-54. On March 24, 2019 he posted his best finish to date in well over a year with a T-30 at the Valspar Championship, earning $39,817.

He earned a top 10 finish on April 28 at the PGA Tour's Zurich Classic of New Orleans team event, combining with Peter Malnati for score of 19 under and a T-9 finish out of 78 teams.

== Personal life ==
Hurley is active in several charities and religious organizations including: Birdies for the Brave, a military outreach initiative sponsored by the PGA Tour; World Gospel Outreach, a children's camp in Honduras; Ark Children's House, an orphanage in Ecuador; and Adoption Advocates International, which operates an orphanage in Ethiopia (Layla House) where he adopted his son, Jacob.

Hurley resides in Annapolis, Maryland with his wife Heather, sons Will and Jacob, and his daughter Madison.

In 2017, Hurley hosted his inaugural charity golf event, Billy Hurley III and The Brave Golf Tournament, at the Naval Academy Golf Course in Annapolis. Proceeds from the event were to go to three beneficiaries: the Anchor Scholarship Foundation, which provides college tuition for family members of surface warfare personnel; to fund a junior golf scholarship administered by the Middle-Atlantic PGA (MAPGA); and to the Naval Academy Athletic Association and directed toward improvements at the Naval Academy Golf Course.

== Professional wins (3) ==
=== PGA Tour wins (1) ===
No.	Date	Tournament	Winning score	To par	Margin of victory	Runner-up
1	Jun 26, 2016	Quicken Loans National	66-65-67-69=267	−17	3 strokes	(Fiji) Vijay Singh

=== NGA Hooters Tour wins (1) ===
- 2010 Terry Moore Ford Open

=== Tarheel Tour wins (1) ===
No.	Date	Tournament	Winning score	To par	Margin of victory	Runners-up
1	Oct 12, 2006	Cedarwood Classic	68-67-69=204	−9	1 stroke	(United States) John McAllister, (United States) Jay McLuen

== Playoff record ==
Web.com Tour playoff record (0–1)

No.	Year	Tournament	Opponents	Result
1	2013	United Leasing Championship	(United States) Joe Affrunti, (Australia) Ashley Hall, (United States) Ben Martin	Martin won with par on first extra hole

== Results in major championships ==
Tournament	2014	2015	2016	2017	2018
Masters Tournament				CUT	
U.S. Open	T48	CUT	CUT		
The Open Championship	T64				
PGA Championship			T22		

Tournament	2019
Masters Tournament	
PGA Championship	
U.S. Open	T72
The Open Championship	

Did not play

CUT = missed the halfway cut
"T" indicates a tie for a place

== Results in The Players Championship ==
Tournament	2015	2016	2017
The Players Championship	CUT		T41

Did not play

CUT = missed the halfway cut
"T" indicates a tie for a place

== Results in World Golf Championships ==
Tournament	2016
Championship	
Match Play	
Invitational	T36
Champions	

Did not play

"T" = Tied

== U.S. national team appearances ==
Amateur

- Palmer Cup: 2004
- Walker Cup: 2005 (winners)

== See also ==
- 2011 Nationwide Tour graduates
- 2013 Web.com Tour Finals graduates
