= Illinois Open Championship =

State golf championship of Illinois

Tournament information
- Location: varies – North Barrington, Illinois in 2026
- Established: 1950
- Course: varies – The Club at Wynstone in 2026
- Par: 72 (in 2026)
- Length: 7,000 yards (6,400 m) (in 2026)
- Organized by: Illinois PGA
- Format: 54-hole stroke play
- Month played: August

Current champion
- Charlie Nikitas

The Illinois Open Championship is a golf tournament that is administered by the Illinois PGA (Professional Golfers' Association). The state championship of golf is a 54-hole championship over three days to determine the finest player in the state of Illinois. The tournament is open to professionals and amateurs with a handicap of 10 or less who reside within the state of Illinois.

In 2015, for the first time in the history of the Illinois Open, the Illinois PGA changed the format of the event having it contested at two facilities for the first and second rounds.

The final championship field size after qualifying events increased from 156 to 258 players. The number of competitors making the cut also increased to the top 70 and ties from the top 50 and ties. Qualifying events conducted throughout the month of June finalize the championship field to the top 258 players.

== Winners ==
Year	Champion	Venue	Location	Score	Low amateur
2026	Charlie Nikitas	The Club at Wynstone	North Barrington, Illinois	196 (−20)	Dujuan Snyman
2025	Michael Feagles	Kemper Lakes Golf Club	Kildeer, Illinois	215 (−1)	Grant Roscich
2024	Charlie Nikitas	Flossmoor Country Club	Flossmoor, Illinois	209 (−7)	Alex Creamean
2023	Vince India	Flossmoor Country Club	Flossmoor, Illinois	208 (−8) ^{PO}	Quinn Clifford
2022	David Perkins	White Eagle Golf Club	Naperville, Illinois	210 (−6)	Marcus Smith
2021	Tee-k Kelly	Stonebridge Country Club	Aurora, Illinois	199 (−17)	Mac McClear
2020	Bryce Emory	White Eagle Golf Club	Naperville, Illinois	208 (−8)	Jordan Less
2019	David Cooke	Ridgemoor Country Club	Chicago, Illinois	203 (−13)	Bryan Baumgarten, Jordan Less
2018	Vince India	The Glen Club	Glenview, Illinois	202 (−14)	David Perkins
2017	Patrick Flavin (a)	The Glen Club	Glenview, Illinois	201 (−13)	Patrick Flavin
2016	Carlos Sainz Jr.	Royal Fox Country Club	St. Charles, Illinois	197 (−17)	Nick Hardy
2015	David Cooke (a)	Royal Melbourne Country Club	Long Grove, Illinois	199 (−16)	David Cooke
2014	Brad Hopfinger	The Glen Club	Glenview, Illinois	210 (−6)	Brian Payne, Dan Stringfellow
2013	Joe Kinney	The Glen Club	Glenview, Illinois	211 (−5) ^{PO}	Dustin Korte
2012	Max Scodro	The Glen Club	Glenview, Illinois	206 (−10) ^{PO}	Brett Tomfohrde
2011	Philip Arouca	Hawthorn Woods Country Club	Hawthorn Woods, Illinois	202 (−11)	Ravi Patel
2010	Eric Meierdierks	Hawthorn Woods Country Club	Hawthorn Woods, Illinois	201 (−6)^{***}	Luke Guthrie
2009	Brad Benjamin (a)	Hawthorn Woods Country Club	Hawthorn Woods, Illinois	208 (−5) ^{PO}	Brad Benjamin
2008	Joe Emerich (a)	Hawthorn Woods Country Club	Hawthorn Woods, Illinois	208 (−5)	Joe Emerich
2007	Mike Small	The Glen Club	Glenview, Illinois	136 (−6)^{**}	Joe Cermak
2006	Mike Small	The Glen Club	Glenview, Illinois	205 (−11)	Carlos Sainz
2005	Mike Small	The Glen Club	Glenview, Illinois	208 (−8)	Andy Pope
2004	Joe Affrunti	The Glen Club	Glenview, Illinois	210 (−6) ^{PO}	Kevin Tassistro
2003	Mike Small	The Glen Club	Glenview, Illinois	203 (−13)	Andrew Price, John Wright
2002	Brian Payne	The Glen Club	Glenview, Illinois	207 (−6)	Scott Harrington
2001	Roy Biancalana	Royal Fox Country Club	St. Charles, Illinois	212 (−1) ^{PO}	Joe Affrunti
2000	Curtis Malm (a)	Royal Fox Country Club	St. Charles, Illinois	209 (−4)	Curtis Malm
1999	Adam Turner (a)	Fox Bend Golf Course	Oswego, Illinois	207 (−9)	Adam Turner
1998	Todd Tremaglio	Orchard Valley Golf Course	Aurora, Illinois	209 (−7) ^{PO}	D. A. Points
1997	Marty Schiene	Fox Bend Golf Course	Oswego, Illinois	205 (−11)	Bill Hoffer
1996	Mark Hensby	Orchard Valley Golf Course	Aurora, Illinois	204 (−12)	Michael Cushin, Bill Hoffer
1995	Rick Dalpos	Royal Fox Country Club	St. Charles, Illinois	211 (−2)	Chip Travis
1994	Gary Groh	Royal Fox Country Club	St. Charles, Illinois	207 (−6)	Bill Hoffer
1993	Dino Lucchesi	Royal Fox Country Club	St. Charles, Illinois	208 (−5)	Bill Hoffer, Lee Kolquist
1992	Marty Schiene	Royal Fox Country Club	St. Charles, Illinois	205 (−8) ^{PO}	Lee Kolquist
1991	Marty Schiene	Royal Fox Country Club	St. Charles, Illinois	211 (−2)	Lee Kolquist
1990	Gary Pinns	Midlane Country Club	Wadsworth, Illinois	208 (−8)	Rich Dukelow
1989	Bob Ackerman	Turnberry Country Club	Lakewood, Illinois	207 (−9)	Joel Hirsch
1988	Gary Pinns	Golf Club of Illinois	Algonquin, Illinois	213 (E)	Jack Fritsch, Robert Sullivan
1987	Roy Biancalana	Midlane Country Club	Wadsworth, Illinois	206 (−10)	George Glickley
1986	Gary Pinns	Village Links of Glen Ellyn	Glen Ellyn, Illinois	210 (−3)	Gary March
1985	Gary Pinns	Crestwicke Country Club	Bloomington, Illinois	209 (−7)	Brad Barker
1984	Lance Ten Broeck	Flossmoor Country Club	Flossmoor, Illinois	207 (−9)	Bill Hoffer
1983	Bill Hoffer (a)	Elgin Country Club	Elgin, Illinois	212 (−4) ^{PO}	Bill Hoffer
1982	Gary Hallberg	Bon Vivant Country Club	Bourbonnais, Illinois	212 (−4) ^{PO}	Andy Shuman
1981	Rick Ten Broeck (a)	Bon Vivant Country Club	Bourbonnais, Illinois	213 (−3)	Rick Ten Broeck
1980	David Ogrin (a)	Bloomington Country Club	Bloomington, Illinois	210 (−3)	David Ogrin
1979	Jim Urban	Fox Bend Golf Course	Oswego, Illinois	208 (−5)	George Glickley
1978	Gary Pinns (a)	Elgin Country Club	Elgin, Illinois	212 (−4)	Gary Pinns
1977	Gary Hallberg (a)	Elgin Country Club	Elgin, Illinois	208 (−8)	Gary Hallberg
1976	Dennis Sullivan	Exmoor Country Club	Highland Park, Illinois	217 (+4)	John Baldwin
1975	Bill Erfurth	Northmoor Country Club	Highland Park, Illinois	210 (−3)	Bruce Johnson
1974	Emil Esposito	Rolling Green Country Club	Arlington Heights, Illinois	212 (−4)	Dennis Sullivan
1973	Rick Ten Broeck	Barrington Hills Country Club	Barrington, Illinois	209 (−4) ^{PO}	Gary Ostrega
1972	John Gostele	Green Acres Country Club	Northbrook, Illinois	212 (−1)	Tom Benjamin
1971	Dick Hart	Biltmore Country Club	North Barrington, Illinois	212 (+2)	Joel Hirsch
1970	Al Bailey	Prestwick Country Club	Frankfort, Illinois	211 (−5)	Joel Hirsch
1969	Dick Hart	Edgewood Valley Country Club	LaGrange, Illinois	217 (+1) ^{PO}	Bob Zender
1968	Chick Evans (a)	Riverside Golf Club	Riverside, Illinois	214 (+4)	Gene Howard
1967	Bill Ogden	Champaign Country Club	Champaign, Illinois	213 (E)	Jack Charron
1966	Emil Esposito	Briarwood Country Club	Deerfield, Illinois	220 (+7) ^{PO}	Earl Liff
1965	Jack Fleck	Skokie Country Club	Glencoe, Illinois	212 (−4)	Tull Monsees
1964	Dick Hart	Medinah Country Club, Course No. 3	Medinah, Illinois	224 (+8) ^{PO}	Frederic Franz
1963	Jack Bell	Knollwood Country Club	Lake Forest, Illinois	209 (−7)	Gene Howard
1962	John Paul Jones	Glen Oak Country Club	Glen Ellyn, Illinois	215 (−1)	Ed Carroll
1961	Chuck Malchaski	Medinah Country Club, Course No. 3	Medinah, Illinois	221 (+5)	Bernard Magnussen
1960	Bob Bruno	Olympia Fields Country Club, North Course	Olympia Fields, Illinois	215 (+2)	Martin Stanovich
1959	Jack Bell	Oak Park Country Club	River Grove, Illinois	217 (+1)	Jim McCarthy, Dean Refram
1958	Felice Torza	Beverly Country Club	Chicago, Illinois	215 (+2)	Martin Stanovich
1957	Jock Hutchison Jr.	Sunset Ridge Country Club	Northfield, Illinois	213 (E)	Harold Foreman Jr.
1956	Bob Harris	North Shore Country Club	Glenview, Illinois	215 (−1)	John Wagner
1955	Bob Harris	Flossmoor Country Club	Flossmoor, Illinois	209 (−7)	John Wagner
1954	George Bolesta	Olympia Fields Country Club, North Course	Olympia Fields, Illinois	219 (+4)	John Dobro
1953	Errie Ball	Ravisloe Country Club	Homewood, Illinois	138 (−2) ^{*}	Harold Foreman Jr.
1952	Bill Ogden	Midlothian Country Club	Midlothian, Illinois	142 (E) ^{PO} ^{*}	George Victor
1951	Jackson Bradley	Gleneagles Country Club	Lemont, Illinois	140 (−4) ^{*}	John Wagner
1950	Felice Torza	Onwentsia Country Club	Lake Forest, Illinois	139 (−5) ^{*}	Art Hoff

- a = Amateur
- ^{PO} = Won in playoff
- ^{*} = Championship was 36-holes
- ^{**} = Championship was shortened to 36-holes after the second round was canceled due to weather
- ^{***} = Championship was played as a par 69 instead of 71 due to flooding. The par 5, 17th hole was played as a 158-yard, par 3.

== Early history ==
The modern incarnation of the Illinois Open dates back to 1950. However, records show Jock Hutchison winning the 1920 Illinois Open, Leo Diegel winning in 1924 and "Lighthorse" Harry Cooper winning in 1933, 1934 and 1935.
