= Ashley Hall (golfer) =

Australian professional golfer

Personal information
- Nationality: Australia
- Born: 3 November 1983 (age 42) Melbourne, Australia

Career
- Sport: Golf
- Turned professional: 2006
- Current tour: PGA Tour of Australasia
- Former tour: Web.com Tour
- Professional wins: 3

Number of wins by tour
- PGA Tour of Australasia: 2
- Other: 1

Best results in major championships
- Masters Tournament: DNP
- PGA Championship: DNP
- U.S. Open: DNP
- The Open Championship: CUT: 2012, 2017

Ashley Hall (born 3 November 1983) is an Australian professional golfer. He played on the Web.com Tour from 2013 to 2015. He was in a playoff in successive events in 2013, the United Leasing Championship and the Utah Championship, but lost on both occasions. At the end of 2016 he lost another playoff in the Emirates Australian Open and was 4th in the Australian PGA Championship two weeks later. His runner-up position in the Australian Open gave him an entry into the 2017 Open Championship. Hall played in the 2012 Open, where he qualified through International Final Qualifying.

== Amateur wins ==
this list may be incomplete

- 2005 Master of the Amateurs

== Professional wins (3) ==
=== PGA Tour of Australasia wins (2) ===
No.	Date	Tournament	Winning score	Margin of victory	Runner(s)-up
1	1 Feb 2009	Subaru Victorian Open	−10 (68-65-72-69=274)	2 strokes	(Australia) Scott Laycock, (Australia) Craig Scott
2	12 Feb 2016	Mercedes-Benz Truck and Bus Victorian PGA Championship	−11 (66-69-72-70=277)	Playoff	(Australia) David McKenzie

PGA Tour of Australasia playoff record (1–2)

No.	Year	Tournament	Opponent(s)	Result
1	2010	New Zealand PGA Championship	(Australia) Mitchell Brown	Lost to birdie on first extra hole
2	2016	Mercedes-Benz Truck and Bus Victorian PGA Championship	(Australia) David McKenzie	Won with birdie on first extra hole
3	2016	Emirates Australian Open	(Australia) Cameron Smith, (United States) Jordan Spieth	Spieth won with birdie on first extra hole

=== Von Nida Tour wins (1) ===
No.	Date	Tournament	Winning score	Margin of victory	Runner-up
1	28 Jan 2007	NAB Victorian PGA Championship	−11 (69-70-70-68=277)	Playoff	(Australia) Tristan Lambert

== Playoff record ==
Web.com Tour playoff record (0–2)

No.	Year	Tournament	Opponent(s)	Result
1	2013	United Leasing Championship	(United States) Joe Affrunti, (United States) Billy Hurley III, (United States) Ben Martin	Martin won with par on first extra hole
2	2013	Utah Championship	(New Zealand) Steven Alker	Lost to par on first extra hole

== Results in major championships ==
Tournament	2012	2013	2014	2015	2016	2017
Masters Tournament						
U.S. Open						
The Open Championship	CUT					CUT
PGA Championship						

Did not play

CUT = missed the halfway cut

== Results in World Golf Championships ==
Tournament	2017
Match Play	
Championship	
Invitational	
Champions	74

Did not play

== Team appearances ==
Amateur

- Australian Men's Interstate Teams Matches (representing Victoria): 2005, 2006
