= Illinois PGA Championship =

Golf tournament

Tournament information
- Location: Varies: Elgin, Illinois (in 2026)
- Established: 1922
- Course: Varies: Elgin Country Club (in 2026)
- Organized by: Illinois PGA
- Format: Stroke play, 54 holes
- Month played: August

Current champion
- Andrew Svoboda

The Illinois PGA Championship is a golf tournament that is conducted by the Illinois PGA (Professional Golfers' Association). The 54-hole, stroke play Championship conducted over three days is the premier member event on the Illinois PGA calendar. The tournament is open to all "Class A" Illinois PGA Professionals in good standing with the PGA of America.

== History ==
The first Illinois PGA Championship was held in 1922 and won by Eddie Loos. In addition to the first place purse money, the winner is awarded the Jim Kemper Cup, which was donated by Jim Kemper, the former president and chairman of the board of Kemper Insurance Company.

== Method of play ==
The Illinois PGA Championship is a 54-hole stroke-play event. Following 36 holes of play, the field is cut to the low 50 scores plus ties. In the event of a tie for the Championship, there is a three-hole, total stroke playoff. If the contestants remain tied after three (3) holes, the playoff will continue on a sudden death basis.

== PGA Professional National Championship (PPNC) qualifying ==
The Illinois PGA Champion, along with a pre-determined number of finishers (based on total entries received), receive an exemption to play in the PGA Professional National Championship the following year.

== Patriot Golf Day ==
During the first round of the Illinois PGA Championship, all competitors are asked to make a voluntary donation at registration in support of Patriot Golf Day – a joint initiative of the PGA of America and the United States Golf Association (USGA) that supports the Folds of Honor Foundation which provides post-secondary educational scholarships for children and spouses of military service men and women killed or disabled while serving our great nation. Contributions are also accepted through subsequent rounds. At the conclusion of the Championship, the Illinois PGA matches all funds donated by its members.

== Winners ==
Year	Champion	Venue	Location	Score	Margin	Runner(s)-up
2026	Andrew Svoboda	Elgin Country Club	Elgin, Illinois	66-71=137 (−7)	PO	Andy Mickelson
2025	Brian Carroll	Beverly Country Club	Chicago, Illinois	72-66=138 (−4)	1	Jeff Kellen
2024	Brian Carroll	Elgin Country Club	Elgin, Illinois	68-65-68=201 (−15)	2	Matthew Rion
2023	Mike Small	Thunderhawk	Beach Park, Illinois	66-69=135 (−9)	1	Jeff Kellen, Andy Mickelson
2022	Brian Carroll	Makray Memorial	Barrington, Illinois	69-71-67=207 (−6)	PO	Mike Small
2021	Andy Mickelson	Ivanhoe Club	Ivanhoe, Illinois	71-71-71=213 (−3)	4	Garrett Chaussard, Kurt Rogers
2020	Mike Small	Medinah Country Club, Course No. 1	Medinah, Illinois	69-63-68=200 (−13)	4	Frank Hohenadel, Andy Mickelson
2019	Travis Johns	Ruth Lake Country Club	Hinsdale, Illinois	70-68=138 (−4)	1	Garrett Chaussard
2018	Dakun Chang	Stonewall Orchard Golf Club	Grayslake, Illinois	70-69-73=212 (−4)	PO	Brian Carroll
2017	Adam Schumacher	Medinah Country Club, Course No. 1	Medinah, Illinois	67-73-69=209 (−4)	3	Brett Walker
2016	Mike Small	Olympia Fields Country Club, South Course	Olympia Fields, Illinois	71-67-68=206 (−10)	2	Brian Brodell, Travis Johns, Curtis Malm
2015	Jim Billiter	Medinah Country Club, Course No. 1	Medinah, Illinois	68-66-70=204 (−9)	2	Matt Slowinski
2014	Mike Small	Stonewall Orchard Golf Club	Grayslake, Illinois	67-67-66=200 (−16)	5	Steve Orrick
2013	Mike Small	Olympia Fields Country Club, South Course	Olympia Fields, Illinois	69-72-68=209 (−4)	4	Travis Johns, Curtis Malm, Matt Slowinski
2012	Steve Orrick	Stonewall Orchard Golf Club	Grayslake, Illinois	72-70-65=207 (−9)	5	Curtis Malm
2011	Frank Hohenadel	Medinah Country Club, Course No. 1	Medinah, Illinois	65-70-72=207 (−6)	4	Matt Slowinski
2010	Mike Small	Olympia Fields Country Club, South Course	Olympia Fields, Illinois	70-63-67=200 (−13)	11	Travis Johns
2009	Mike Small	Stonewall Orchard Golf Club	Grayslake, Illinois	67-69-71=207 (−9)	6	Jim Sobb
2008	Mike Small	Medinah Country Club, Course No. 1	Medinah, Illinois	67-67-71=205 (−8)	1	Steve Orrick
2007	Mike Small	Stonewall Orchard Golf Club	Grayslake, Illinois	63-69-70=202 (−14)	3	Roy Biancalana
2006	Mike Small	Stonewall Orchard Golf Club	Grayslake, Illinois	71-66-72=209 (−7)	5	Darren Stanek
2005	Mike Small	Stonewall Orchard Golf Club	Grayslake, Illinois	73-67-71=211 (−5)	1	Connie DeMattia
2004	Mike Small	Royal Melbourne Country Club	Long Grove, Illinois	73-65-71=209 (−7)	6	Biancalana, DeMattia, Brett Melton
2003	Mike Small	Royal Melbourne Country Club	Long Grove, Illinois	69-74-75=218 (+2)	1	Roy Biancalana
2002	Gary Groh	Kemper Lakes Golf Club	Kildeer, Illinois	74-70-74=218 (+2)	PO	Mike Small
2001	Mike Small	Kemper Lakes Golf Club	Kildeer, Illinois	69-73-71=213 (−3)	2	Dino Lucchesi
2000	Jim Sobb	Kemper Lakes Golf Club	Kildeer, Illinois		1	Kelly Holmes, John Cleary
1999	Jim Sobb	Kemper Lakes Golf Club	Kildeer, Illinois			
1998	Dino Lucchesi	Kemper Lakes Golf Club	Kildeer, Illinois			
1997	Doug Bauman	Kemper Lakes Golf Club	Kildeer, Illinois			
1996	Doug Bauman	Kemper Lakes Golf Club	Kildeer, Illinois			
1995	Jim Sobb	Kemper Lakes Golf Club	Kildeer, Illinois			
1994	Steve Benson	Kemper Lakes Golf Club	Kildeer, Illinois			
1993	Bob Ackerman	Kemper Lakes Golf Club	Kildeer, Illinois			
1992	David Prange	Kemper Lakes Golf Club	Kildeer, Illinois			
1991	Rick Dalpos	Kemper Lakes Golf Club	Kildeer, Illinois			
1990	Rick Dalpos	Kemper Lakes Golf Club	Kildeer, Illinois			
1989	Gary Groh	Kemper Lakes Golf Club	Kildeer, Illinois			
1988	Bob Ackerman	Kemper Lakes Golf Club	Kildeer, Illinois			
1987	Gary Hopkins	Kemper Lakes Golf Club	Kildeer, Illinois			
1986	Gary Groh	Kemper Lakes Golf Club	Kildeer, Illinois			
1985	Ed Oldfield Jr.	Kemper Lakes Golf Club	Kildeer, Illinois			
1984	Steve Benson	Kemper Lakes Golf Club	Kildeer, Illinois			
1983	Gary Groh	Kemper Lakes Golf Club	Kildeer, Illinois			
1982	Steve Benson	Kemper Lakes Golf Club	Kildeer, Illinois			
1981	Robert Powers	Kemper Lakes Golf Club	Kildeer, Illinois			
1980	Mark Wolfla	Kemper Lakes Golf Club	Kildeer, Illinois			
1979	Emil Esposito	Kemper Lakes Golf Club	Kildeer, Illinois			
1978	Bob Zender					
1977	Bob Zender	Lincolnshire Country Club	Crete, Illinois	??-??-67=206 (−10)	7	Steve Benson
1976	Bob Zender	Lincolnshire Country Club	Crete, Illinois			
1975	Shelby Futch					
1974	Bill Ventresca					
1973	Dean Lind					
1972	Bill Ogden					
1971	Bill Ogden					
1970	Tony Holguin					
1969	Doug MacDonald					
1968	Chuck Malchaski					
1967	George Keyes					
1966	Dick Hart					
1965	Errie Ball					
1964	Jack Fleck					
1963	Dick Hart					
1962	Tony Holguin					
1961	Bob Harris					
1960	Bill Ogden					
1959	Bob Harris					
1958	Chuck Malchaski					
1957	Bill Ogden					
1956	George Keyes					
1955	Errie Ball					
1954	Tony Holguin					
1953	Bill Ogden					
1952	Mike Sipula					
1951	Sam Bernardi					
1950	Ky Laffoon					
1949	Errie Ball					
1948	Henry Ransom					
1947	Johnny Revolta					
1946	Jim Foulis					
1945	Jack Grout					
1944	George Smith					
1943	Jim Foulis					
1942	Johnny Revolta	St. Charles Country Club	St. Charles, Illinois	71-70-69=210 (−6)	1	Jim Foulis
1941	Johnny Revolta					
1940	Dutch Harrison					
1939	Dick Metz	Champaign Country Club	Champaign, Illinois			
1938	Johnny Revolta					
1937	Johnny Revolta					
1936	Johnny Revolta					
1935	Frank Walsh					
1934	Harry Cooper					
1933	Jim Foulis					
1932	Harry Cooper					
1931	Abe Espinosa					
1930	Al Espinosa					
1929	Jim Foulis					
1928	Al Espinosa					
1927	Al Espinosa					
1926	Jock Hutchison					
1925	Jock Hutchison					
1924	Eddie Loos	Glen Flora Country Club	Waukegan, Illinois			
1923	Jock Hutchison					
1922	Eddie Loos	Lake Shore Country Club	Glencoe, Illinois		1	Jock Hutchison

- ^{PO} = Won in playoff

== Multiple winners ==
The following players have won the Illinois PGA Championship multiple times:

- 14 wins:
  - Mike Small – 2001, 2003, 2004, 2005, 2006, 2007, 2008, 2009, 2010, 2013, 2014, 2016, 2020, 2023
- 6 wins
  - Johnny Revolta – 1936, 1937, 1938, 1941, 1942, 1947
- 5 wins:
  - Bill Ogden – 1953, 1957, 1960, 1971, 1972
- 4 wins:
  - Jim Foulis – 1929, 1933, 1943, 1946
  - Gary Groh – 1983, 1986, 1989, 2002
- 3 wins:
  - Errie Ball – 1949, 1955, 1965
  - Steve Benson – 1982, 1984, 1994
  - Al Espinosa – 1927, 1928, 1930
  - Tony Holguin – 1954, 1962, 1970
  - Jock Hutchinson – 1923, 1925, 1926
  - Jim Sobb – 1995, 1999, 2000
  - Bob Zender – 1976, 1977, 1978
- 2 wins:
  - Bob Ackerman – 1988, 1993
  - Doug Bauman – 1996, 1997
  - Harry Cooper – 1932, 1934
  - Rick Dalpos – 1990, 1991
  - Bob Harris – 1959, 1961
  - Dick Hart – 1963, 1966
  - George Keyes - 1956, 1967
  - Eddie Loos – 1922, 1924
  - Chuck Malchaski – 1958, 1968
