= Joe Affrunti =

American professional golfer (born 1981)

Personal information
- Nationality: United States
- Born: August 1, 1981 (age 45) Chicago, Illinois, U.S.
- Height: 5 ft 7 in (1.70 m)
- Weight: 155 lb (70 kg; 11.1 st)
- Spouse: Megan Beasley Affrunti
- Children: 1

Career
- Sport: Golf
- College: University of Minnesota; University of Illinois
- Turned professional: 2004
- Current tour: PGA Tour Latinoamérica
- Former tours: PGA Tour; Nationwide Tour
- Professional wins: 3

Joe Affrunti (born August 1, 1981) is an American professional golfer.

== Professional career ==
In 2004, Affrunti turned professional. He joined the Nationwide Tour in 2010, and earned his 2011 PGA Tour card by finishing 22nd on the money list, with two runner-up finishes. However, a shoulder injury prevented him from playing any events in his debut season beyond April.

== Amateur wins ==
- 2000 Chicago District Amateur Championship
- 2001 Chicago District Amateur Championship

== Professional wins (3) ==
- 2004 Illinois Open
- 2009 The Kandy Waters Memorial Classic, Southern Dunes Winter Series (both NGA Hooters Tour)

== Playoff record ==
Web.com Tour playoff record (0–2)

No.	Year	Tournament	Opponents	Result
1	2010	Chattanooga Classic	(United States) David Branshaw, (Australia) Scott Gardiner	Gardiner won with birdie on fourth extra hole Branshaw eliminated by birdie on first hole
2	2013	United Leasing Championship	(Australia) Ashley Hall, (United States) Billy Hurley III, (United States) Ben Martin	Martin won with par on first extra hole

== See also ==
- 2010 Nationwide Tour graduates
