= Matt Bettencourt =

American professional golfer

Personal information
- Nationality: United States
- Born: April 12, 1975 (age 51) Alameda, California, U.S.
- Height: 5 ft 11 in (1.80 m)
- Weight: 170 lb (77 kg)

Career
- Sport: Golf
- College: Modesto Junior College
- Turned professional: 2001
- Current tour: PGA Tour
- Former tour: Web.com Tour
- Professional wins: 6

Number of wins by tour
- PGA Tour: 1
- Korn Ferry Tour: 2
- Other: 3

Best results in major championships
- Masters Tournament: DNP
- PGA Championship: CUT: 2010
- U.S. Open: T10: 2009
- The Open Championship: DNP

Achievements and awards
- Nationwide Tour money list winner: 2008

Matt Bettencourt (born April 12, 1975) is an American professional golfer.

== Early life ==
Bettencourt was born in Alameda, California. He attended Modesto Junior College.

== Professional career ==
In 2001, Bettencourt turned professional. In 2008, Bettencourt won twice on the Nationwide Tour, at the Oregon Classic in September and a month and a half later at the season-ending Nationwide Tour Championship at TPC Craig Ranch. The second win took him from 12th to 1st in the money list, therefore earning him his 2009 PGA Tour card.

In 2009, his rookie season on tour, Bettencourt finished 111th on the PGA Tour money list to retain his card for 2010. In 2010, he gained his first PGA Tour win at the Reno-Tahoe Open, one shot ahead of Bob Heintz after Heintz missed a 3.5 feet (1.1 m) birdie putt on the 72nd hole. This win ensures PGA Tour exemption for Bettencourt until the end of the 2012 season in a tough season that saw Bettencourt make 14 cuts in 32 appearances.

Bettencourt split time in 2013 between the Web.com Tour and PGA Tour. He finished 16th on the 2013 Web.com Tour regular season money list to earn his 2014 PGA Tour card. In 2014, he made only 4 cuts in 14 events and finished 211th on the FedEx Cup points list, therefore he lost his PGA Tour card and also missed the Web.com Tour Finals. The finish demoted Bettencourt to the past champions category for the 2014-15 season and forced him to Web.com Tour Qualifying School.

== Professional wins (6) ==
=== PGA Tour wins (1) ===
No.	Date	Tournament	Winning score	Margin of victory	Runner-up
1	Jul 18, 2010	Reno–Tahoe Open	−11 (66-68-75-68=277)	1 stroke	(United States) Bob Heintz

=== Web.com Tour wins (2) ===
Legend
Tour Championships (1)
Other Web.com Tour (1)

No.	Date	Tournament	Winning score	Margin of victory	Runner-up
1	Sep 21, 2008	Oregon Classic	−19 (65-70-65-69=269)	2 strokes	(United States) Bubba Dickerson
2	Nov 9, 2008	Nationwide Tour Championship	−17 (68-67-63-69=267)	1 stroke	(United States) Jeff Klauk

Web.com Tour playoff record (0–2)

No.	Year	Tournament	Opponent	Result
1	2008	Miccosukee Championship	(United States) D. A. Points	Lost to birdie on first extra hole
2	2013	Cox Classic	(Australia) Bronson La'Cassie	Lost to par on third extra hole

=== Other wins (3) ===
- 2002 Northern California Open
- 2003 Northern California Open
- 2007 Northern California Open

== Results in major championships ==
Tournament	2009	2010	2011	2012	2013
Masters Tournament					
U.S. Open	T10	T70		CUT	T53
The Open Championship					
PGA Championship		CUT			

Top 10
Did not play

CUT = missed the half-way cut
"T" = tied for place

=== Summary ===
Tournament	Wins	2nd	3rd	Top-5	Top-10	Top-25	Events	Cuts made
Masters Tournament	0	0	0	0	0	0	0	0
U.S. Open	0	0	0	0	1	1	4	3
The Open Championship	0	0	0	0	0	0	0	0
PGA Championship	0	0	0	0	0	0	1	0
Totals	0	0	0	0	1	1	5	3

- Most consecutive cuts made – 2 (2009 U.S. Open – 2010 U.S. Open)
- Longest streak of top-10s – 1

== Results in The Players Championship ==
Tournament	2009	2010	2011	2012
The Players Championship	CUT	CUT	CUT	CUT

CUT = missed the halfway cut

== See also ==
- 2008 Nationwide Tour graduates
- 2013 Web.com Tour Finals graduates
