= Audubon International =

American environmental education organization

Audubon International is a not for profit 501(c)(3) environmental education organization based in Troy, New York. Established in 1987, the organization works with communities, developments, resorts, and golf courses in 36 countries to plan and implement sustainable natural resource management practices, as well as receive public recognition (through certification processes) for employing sound environmental stewardship.

It is the first organization to work extensively with the golf industry on sustainability issues. It has a long history of partnering with industry associations such as the United States Golf Association (USGA). The organization has been recognized by the U.S. Environmental Protection Agency and other environmental community members for enabling facilities to adopt design and operations practices consistent with the principles of sustainability. Central to Audubon International's core value system is the belief that voluntary education and certification programs can simultaneously advance ecological, economic, and social goals.

The organization is not affiliated with the National Audubon Society, which sued to prevent the organization from using the Audubon name. In 1991, a judge ruled that the National Audubon Society did not hold an exclusive right to the name Audubon and had not shown that the use of the name by Audubon International was confusing.

== Funding ==
Audubon International is a membership organization and a 501(c)(3) not-for-profit. Most of the funding for the organization comes from golf courses, each paying thousands of dollars to become certified and hundreds of dollars per year for membership. In addition, according to its online list of sponsors, the organization gets funds from turf, irrigation, and landscaping companies.

There is no additional fee for certification in any of Audubon International's programs, and membership fees include the ability to become certified, educational resources, and staff guidance.

== Programs ==
Several programs in the organization aim to educate members and non-members about the environment.

=== Environmental stewardship and management ===
==== Audubon Cooperative Sanctuary Program ====
This program focuses on helping companies and organizations learn about what they can do to help manage their surroundings, enhancing their efficiency and conservation efforts. Audubon International will focus on many things: Energy and Water Conservation, Waste Management, Wildlife and Habitat Management, and Outreach and Education.

Some of the developments that have received this certification are:

- Bakery Feeds, Inc., Centre, Alabama
- Aurora Sports Park, Aurora, Colorado
- Amelia Island Plantation, Amelia Island, Florida
- Griffin Industries, Inc., Florida
- Kapalua Land Company, Hawaii

==== Audubon Cooperative Sanctuary Program for Golf ====
Like the Audubon Cooperative Sanctuary Program, this program works solely with golf courses to help them create environmentally-friendly areas while still having functional spaces to play golf. It also focuses on environmental planning, wildlife and habitat management, chemical use reduction and safety, water conservation, water quality management, and outreach and education. The entire process can take 1 to 3 years to complete.

There are over 2,110 golf courses that participate in this program in 24 countries.

Some of the courses that have earned this certification are:

- Bob O'Connor Golf Course at Schenley Park.
- Shell Point Golf Club, Fort Myers, Florida
- Dwan Golf Club, Bloomington, Minnesota
- The Golf Club at Briar's Creek, Johns Island, South Carolina
- Ocean Winds Golf Course, The Town of Seabrook Island, South Carolina
- Crooked Oaks Golf Course, The Town of Seabrook Island, South Carolina
- The Greenbrier Resort, White Sulphur Springs, West Virginia
- Gull Lake View, Augusta, Michigan
- Lake Malaren Golf Club, Shanghai, China
- Prairie Dunes Country Club, Hutchinson, Kansas
- The River Club, Suwanee, Georgia
- Tuckahoe Creek Course of the Country Club of Virginia, Richmond, Virginia
- Victoria National Golf Course, Newburgh, Indiana
- Westfields Golf Club, Clifton, Virginia
- Wu Fong Golf Course, Taichung, Taiwan

==== Green Lodging Program ====
This program works with hotels to ensure they use green practices in the establishment's upkeep and everyday running. It helps with cost savings, conservation, cost avoidance, and increasing market share. It also awards one of four precious metal designations (bronze, silver, gold, or platinum) as part of its eco-rating.

Some of the hotels that have earned this certification are:

- Hotel Sofitel Chicago Water Tower, Chicago, Illinois
- Resort, Cedar Grove Lodge, Huntsville, Ontario, Canada (4 Leaves)

=== Eco-design ===
==== Signature Program ====
This program works with new housing developments and helps them to create living areas that are environmentally sound. This program has three levels: gold, silver, and bronze, with gold being the top of the list. After completing the program, a development can receive, among other things, certification as an Audubon International Sanctuary.

Some of the developments that have received this certification are:

- Evergrene, Palm Beach Gardens, Florida
- Black Forest at Lake James, Morganton, North Carolina
- Conserve School, Land O' Lakes, Wisconsin

==== Classic Program ====
This program is similar to Audubon Signature Programs, but it is for established developments that are either being redeveloped or restored or want to make their areas more environmentally friendly. There are some minimum requirements; a development will not get certification until it passes a final audit.

=== Community planning and engagement ===
==== Sustainable Communities Program ====
This program works with communities to ensure they are great places to live, work, and play. There are two different tracks: Public Sector and Private Sector. The public sector is geared towards the local government, while the private sector is more for properties run by an association, landlord, or other such private entrepreneur.

Some of the communities that have received this certification are:

- Eufaula, Alabama

== Other programs ==
In addition to these programs, Audubon International also participates in the following:

- Nestbox Network
- North American Birdwatching Open
