= Dallas Athletic Club =

Country club in Dallas, Texas

Coordinates: 32.8413°N 96.6447°W

Dallas Athletic Club, known as DAC, is a private country club located in Dallas, Texas. It was founded in 1919, and was originally located in its own building at the corner of St. Paul and Live Oak streets in downtown Dallas. In 1954, freeway expansion in Dallas forced the club to relocate. It then purchased 317 acres of land to the east of Dallas, located near what is now the northwest corner of the eastern intersection of Interstate 30 and Interstate 635 (Texas) near Mesquite, Texas, a Dallas suburb. The club then became more focused on golf and tennis, whereas the downtown location had included a barber shop, billiards, guest and residential suites, ballrooms, dining rooms, lounges, handball and squash courts, swimming pools and a health services department.

There are two golf courses at the club, the Blue Course and the Gold Course. Both courses, in their current form, were designed by Jack Nicklaus, who had won the 1963 PGA Championship, held at DAC. The Blue Course was originally designed by Ralph Plummer. Young Lee Trevino began in golf by caddying at the club in the mid-1950s.
