= Gary Groh =

American professional golfer

Personal information
- Full name: Gary Mathieu Groh
- Nationality: United States
- Born: October 11, 1944 (age 82) Chicago, Illinois, U.S.
- Height: 6 ft 0 in (1.83 m)
- Weight: 165 lb (75 kg; 11.8 st)

Career
- Sport: Golf
- College: Michigan State University
- Turned professional: 1968
- Former tours: PGA Tour; Champions Tour
- Professional wins: 22

Number of wins by tour
- PGA Tour: 1
- Other: 21

Best results in major championships
- Masters Tournament: T38: 1975
- PGA Championship: CUT: 1975, 1981, 1993
- U.S. Open: T18: 1975
- The Open Championship: DNP

Gary Mathieu Groh (born October 11, 1944) is an American professional golfer. In the 1970s, he played on the PGA Tour in the 1970s.

== Career ==
In 1944, Groh was born in Chicago, Illinois. He attended Michigan State University.

In 1968, Groh and turned pro. He had success at Spring 1969 PGA Tour Qualifying School and shortly thereafter joined the PGA Tour. Groh played on the PGA Tour from 1971 to 1978 and won one event. His career year was 1975 when he won the Hawaiian Open, earned $68,296 and finished 31st on the money list. His best finish in a major championship was T18 at the 1975 U.S. Open.

After leaving the PGA Tour, Groh took a job as head pro at Bob O' Link Golf Club in Highland Park, Illinois – a job he has held for more than a quarter of a century.

In 1995, he joined the Senior PGA Tour and has played in a limited number of events; his best finish in this venue is T17 at the 1995 Ameritech Senior Open.

Groh owns seven course records, including a round of 64 in 1985 at the world-famous Ballybunion in Ireland.

== Personal life ==
Groh lives in Lake Bluff, Illinois.

== Professional wins (22) ==
=== PGA Tour wins (1) ===
No.	Date	Tournament	Winning score	Margin of victory	Runner-up
1	Feb 3, 1975	Hawaiian Open	−14 (68-68-70-68=274)	1 stroke	(United States) Al Geiberger

=== Other wins (6) ===
- 1972 Vern Parsell Buick Open
- 1983 Illinois PGA Championship
- 1986 Illinois PGA Championship
- 1989 Illinois PGA Championship
- 1994 Illinois Open Championship
- 2002 Illinois PGA Championship

=== Senior wins (15) ===
- 1995 Illinois PGA Senior Match Play Championship, Illinois Senior PGA Championship
- 1996 Illinois PGA Senior Match Play Championship, Illinois Senior PGA Championship
- 1997 Illinois PGA Senior Match Play Championship, Illinois Senior PGA Championship
- 1998 Illinois Senior PGA Championship
- 1999 Illinois Senior PGA Championship
- 2000 Illinois Senior Open Championship, Illinois Senior PGA Championship
- 2002 Illinois Senior PGA Championship, Illinois PGA Section Championship
- 2003 Illinois Senior Open Championship, Illinois PGA Section Championship
- 2004 Illinois PGA Section Championship

== See also ==
- Spring 1969 PGA Tour Qualifying School graduates
- 1971 PGA Tour Qualifying School graduates
