= Errie Ball =

Welsh-American professional golfer

- Ball, c. 2006

Personal information
- Full name: Samuel Henry Ball
- Nationality: Wales; United States
- Born: November 14, 1910 Bangor, Wales, UK
- Died: July 2, 2014 (aged 103) Stuart, Florida, US
- Height: 5 ft 6 in (1.68 m)
- Weight: 145 lb (66 kg; 10.4 st)
- Spouse: Maxwell "Maxie" Wright

Career
- Sport: Golf
- Status: Professional
- Professional wins: 11

Best results in major championships
- Masters Tournament: T38: 1934
- PGA Championship: T9: 1948
- U.S. Open: T22: 1956
- The Open Championship: T23: 1936

Achievements and awards
- PGA Hall of Fame: 2011
- Illinois Golf Hall of Fame: 1990

Samuel Henry "Errie" Ball (November 14, 1910 – July 2, 2014) was a Welsh-American professional golfer who competed at the inaugural Augusta National golf tournament in 1934 (now known as the Masters Tournament). He was the last living person to compete in the first Masters and died at the age of 103.

== Early life ==
Ball was born in Bangor, Wales, in 1910. He acquired the nickname "Errie" from his family's French maid who was tasked with caring for him and performing household duties. She had trouble pronouncing "Henry", hence the name Errie. "My father's name was William Henry Ball. Back in those days, Henry became 'Harry'," said Ball, prior to his 100th birthday party. "My mother, from what they tell me, didn't like the fact that they would be calling my father Old Harry and me Young Harry. We had a French maid at that time, and she said, 'Why don't you call him 'Errie?' And I've gone by that ever since. I wouldn't turn around if you called me Sam."

Ball's connection to Bobby Jones began in 1930, when he met the famed Georgian at the Open Championship in Hoylake, England, where Jones would win one leg of his Grand Slam. The relationship continued the day Ball arrived in America—September 27, 1930—just as Jones clinched the Grand Slam with a victory in the U.S. Amateur.

== Golf career ==
Ball's first job was serving for his uncle, Frank Ball, then the PGA head professional at East Lake Golf Club in Atlanta. Ball later assisted George Sargent, who became PGA of America president. In 1933, Ball received a letter of recommendation from Jones that elevated him to his first head professional post at Mobile (Alabama) Country Club.

Ball was still competitive even into his late 40s. At age 47—in the 1958 PGA Championship at Llanerch Country Club—he carded rounds of 79-72-72-73=296 and finished in a tie for 33rd place with Tom Talkington.

Ball served as the head professional at Oak Park Country Club in Chicago, Illinois, for many years. During the winter months he was the head professional at Tucson Country Club in Tucson, Arizona, where his tenure was 14 years, from 1951 through April 1, 1965. In September 1964, Tucson Country Club president Dr. George Bland stated that, "What we need is a full-time pro. The size of the club (about 700 members) dictates this necessity. We'll have a hard time replacing Errie—we're well aware of that."

== Achievement awards ==
Ball was inducted into the Illinois Golf Hall of Fame in 1990. As of 2011, he was giving lessons at the Willoughby Golf Club in Stuart, Florida and he turned 100 on November 14, 2010. Golfweek magazine was on site when he celebrated this event with friends and members at Willoughby Golf Club and posted a story documenting the event. Ball was inducted into the PGA Hall of Fame in 2011.

== Death and legacy ==
Ball, the last of the inaugural Masters field of 1934 and the PGA of America's oldest and longest-serving member, died July 2, 2014, at Martin Hospital South in Stuart, Florida, surrounded by his family. He was 103.

== Tournament wins ==
Note: This list may be incomplete.

- 1931 Southeastern Section PGA Championship
- 1932 Atlanta Open
- 1949 Illinois PGA Championship
- 1951 Arizona PGA
- 1952 Arizona PGA
- 1953 Illinois Open Championship
- 1954 Arizona Open
- 1955 Illinois PGA Match Play Championship, Illinois PGA Championship
- 1965 Illinois PGA Championship
- Illinois PGA Senior Championship

== Results in major championships ==
Tournament	1933	1934	1935	1936	1937	1938	1939
Masters Tournament	NYF	T38					
U.S. Open	CUT		CUT		CUT		
The Open Championship				T23			
PGA Championship		R32		R32		R64	

Tournament	1940	1941	1942	1943	1944	1945	1946	1947	1948	1949
Masters Tournament				NT	NT	NT				
U.S. Open			NT	NT	NT	NT				
The Open Championship	NT	NT	NT	NT	NT	NT				
PGA Championship	R32			NT					R16	R64

Tournament	1950	1951	1952	1953	1954	1955	1956	1957	1958	1959
Masters Tournament								CUT		
U.S. Open				T56		T34	T22	CUT		
The Open Championship										
PGA Championship									T33	

Tournament	1960	1961	1962	1963	1964	1965	1966
Masters Tournament							
U.S. Open	CUT	CUT		CUT			
The Open Championship							
PGA Championship	CUT						T64

Top 10
Did not play

NYF = tournament not yet founded
NT = no tournament
CUT = missed the half-way cut (3rd round cut in 1960 PGA Championship)
R64, R32, R16 = round in which player lost in PGA Championship match play
"T" indicates a tie for a place
