= Michael Putnam =

American professional golfer (born 1983)

Personal information
- Full name: Michael John Putnam
- Nationality: United States
- Born: June 1, 1983 (age 43) Tacoma, Washington, U.S.
- Height: 6 ft 4 in (1.93 m)
- Weight: 215 lb (98 kg; 15.4 st)

Career
- Sport: Golf
- College: Pepperdine University
- Turned professional: 2005
- Former tours: PGA Tour; Web.com Tour
- Professional wins: 3

Number of wins by tour
- Korn Ferry Tour: 3

Best results in major championships
- Masters Tournament: DNP
- PGA Championship: DNP
- U.S. Open: T35: 2017
- The Open Championship: CUT: 2007

Achievements and awards
- Web.com Tour regular season money list winner: 2013
- Web.com Tour Player of the Year: 2013

Michael John Putnam (born June 1, 1983) is an American professional golfer who has played on the PGA Tour and the Web.com Tour.

== Career ==
Putnam was born in Tacoma, Washington. In 2006, he played on the Nationwide Tour. He had two 2nd-place finishes on the Nationwide Tour in 2006 including losing in a playoff at the Rheem Classic. He finished 17th on the money list to earn his PGA Tour card for 2007. He finished 158th on the money list and dropped back to the Nationwide Tour in 2008. He played the Nationwide Tour through 2010 when he finished the year 24th on the money list and earned his 2011 PGA Tour card. Putnam finished 153rd on the PGA Tour money list and lost his Tour card after the 2011 season. In 2013, he finished the Web.com Tour regular season as the leading money winner and regained his PGA Tour card; Putnam was fully exempt as money leader. He was also voted Web.com Tour Player of the Year.

Putnam played the 2013 Web.com Tour season with his older brother, Joel, serving as his caddie. His younger brother, Andrew, plays on the PGA Tour and won the 2018 Barracuda Championship.

== Awards and honors ==
- In 2013, Putnam was the Web.com Tour regular season money list winner.
- In 2013, Putnam earned Web.com Tour Player of the Year honors.

== Amateur wins (1) ==
this list may be incomplete

- 2004 Pacific Coast Amateur

== Professional wins (3) ==
=== Web.com Tour wins (3) ===
No.	Date	Tournament	Winning score	Margin of victory	Runner(s)-up
1	Sep 12, 2010	Utah Championship	−18 (66-66-67-67=266)	3 strokes	(Venezuela) Jhonattan Vegas, (New Zealand) Bradley Iles
2	May 26, 2013	Mexico Championship	−13 (64-72-73-66=275)	2 strokes	(South Korea) Kim Meen-whee, (United States) Alex Prugh, (United States) Wes Roach
3	Jun 2, 2013	Mid-Atlantic Championship	−7 (71-64-70-68=273)	2 strokes	(United States) Chesson Hadley

Web.com Tour playoff record (0–1)

No.	Year	Tournament	Opponent	Result
1	2006	Rheem Classic	(United States) Darron Stiles	Lost to par on first extra hole

== Results in major championships ==
Tournament	2005	2006	2007	2008	2009	2010	2011	2012	2013	2014	2015	2016	2017	2018
Masters Tournament														
U.S. Open	CUT		T55				T45				CUT		T35	CUT
The Open Championship			CUT											
PGA Championship														

Did not play

CUT = missed the half-way cut
"T" = tied for place

== Results in The Players Championship ==
Tournament	2014	2015
The Players Championship	CUT	CUT

CUT = missed the halfway cut

== U.S. national team appearances ==
Amateur

- Palmer Cup: 2005 (winners)
- Walker Cup: 2005 (winners)

== See also ==
- 2006 Nationwide Tour graduates
- 2010 Nationwide Tour graduates
- 2010 PGA Tour Qualifying School graduates
- 2013 Web.com Tour Finals graduates
