= United Leasing & Finance Championship =

Tournament information
- Location: Newburgh, Indiana
- Established: 2012
- Course: Victoria National Golf Club
- Par: 72
- Length: 7,242 yards (6,622 m)
- Tour: Web.com Tour
- Format: Stroke play
- Prize fund: US$600,000
- Month played: April
- Final year: 2018

Tournament record score
- Aggregate: 276 Séamus Power (2016)
- To par: −12 as above

Final champion
- (Mexico) José de Jesús Rodríguez
- Location in the United States Location in Indiana

The United Leasing & Finance Championship was a golf tournament on the Web.com Tour. It was organized and run by the Evansville Sports Corporation and played at the Victoria National Golf Club in Newburgh, Indiana. It was first held in 2012 from June 28 to July 1. The 2015 purse was US$600,000, with $108,000 going to the winner.

In the first five years of the event, the United Leasing & Finance Championship donated more than $870,000 to over 100 Tri-State charities and continues to be broadcast around the world on the Golf Channel network.

== Winners ==
| Year | Winner | Score | To par | Margin of victory | Runner(s)-up |
United Leasing & Finance Championship
| 2018 | (Mexico) José de Jesús Rodríguez | 282 | −6 | 1 stroke | (United States) Wyndham Clark |
| 2017 | (South Korea) Lee Dong-hwan | 282 | −6 | 1 stroke | (United States) Jason Gore |
| 2016 | (Republic of Ireland) Séamus Power | 276 | −12 | 1 stroke | (United States) Cody Gribble (United States) Jonathan Randolph (United States) Adam Schenk |
United Leasing Championship
| 2015 | (United States) Smylie Kaufman | 278 | −10 | 5 strokes | (United States) Adam Long (United States) Jonathan Randolph (United States) Ryan Spears |
| 2014 | (England) Greg Owen | 279 | −9 | 1 stroke | (United States) Ryan Armour (United States) Mark Hubbard |
| 2013 | (United States) Ben Martin | 277 | −11 | Playoff | (United States) Joe Affrunti (Australia) Ashley Hall (United States) Billy Hurley III |
| 2012 | (United States) Peter Tomasulo | 277 | −11 | Playoff | (Sweden) David Lingmerth |
