= Mike Small (golfer) =

American professional golfer, college golf coach (born 1966)

Personal information
- Nationality: United States
- Born: March 4, 1966 (age 60) Aurora, Illinois, U.S.
- Height: 6 ft 0 in (1.83 m)
- Weight: 185 lb (84 kg; 13.2 st)

Career
- Sport: Golf
- College: University of Illinois
- Turned professional: 1990
- Former tours: PGA Tour; Nationwide Tour; Hooters Tour
- Professional wins: 35

Number of wins by tour
- Korn Ferry Tour: 2
- Other: 33

Best results in major championships
- Masters Tournament: DNP
- PGA Championship: T69: 2007, 2011
- U.S. Open: CUT: 1994, 1998, 2007
- The Open Championship: DNP

Mike Small (born March 4, 1966) is an American professional golfer and college golf coach.

== Amateur career ==
Small was born in Aurora, Illinois and grew up in Danville, Illinois. He was a four-time letter winner at Danville High School. He won the Junior Masters in 1984 and went on to play college golf at the University of Illinois. At Illinois, he was a member of the 1988 Big Ten Championship team, where he finished second behind teammate and current PGA Tour member Steve Stricker. Small was named to the All-Big Ten squad and won two tournaments during his senior year, the Butler National Intercollegiate and the Michigan State Spartan Classic.

== Professional career ==
In 1990, Small turned professional. He played on various tours before joining the PGA Tour in 1995. In 1997, he won two Nike Tour events and finished in the top 15 on the Nike Tour money list, earning his PGA Tour card for the 1998 season. He played on the PGA Tour in 1998, where his best finish was 9th place at the Bell Canadian Open. In 2003, Small won the Illinois PGA and Illinois Open titles, becoming the first golfer ever to win both tournaments in the same year. He would repeat that feat three more times on the way to winning twelve IPGA titles and four Illinois Opens. He has played in 96 Nationwide Tour events finishing in the top-10 eight times. Small has also won the PGA Professional National Championship thrice, in 2005, in 2009, and in 2010. He has played in over 50 PGA Tour events in his career, including thirteen major championships. In 2016, he turned 50 and qualified for his first senior major championship, finishing T-43 at the U.S. Senior Open. He has also finished as the low club professional in the PGA Championship in 2007 and 2011.

Small has been the head golf coach at the University of Illinois since 2000. He was Big Ten Coach of the Year for the 2001–02 season, when Illinois placed 18th in the NCAA Championships. He won the honor again for the 2008–09 season when Illinois won their first Big Ten title in 21 years. He led the Illini to the Big Ten championship in each of the next four seasons, again winning conference coach of the year honors each year. In addition, he has been named Midwest Coach of the Year by the Golf Coaches Association five times, in 2003, 2009, 2010, 2011 and 2013. His 2013 Illini team won the school's first-ever NCAA Regional championship, and finished second in the NCAA Finals after defeating defending champion Texas and #1-ranked California in match play. It marks Illinois' best finish in school history.

== Personal life ==
Small's father, Bill Small, was captain of the 1963 Big Ten Champion Illinois Fighting Illini men's basketball team and earned All Big-Ten honors. Small's brother, Andy, was a member of the 1990 Big Ten Champion Illinois baseball squad and won four varsity letters as an infielder.

== Awards and honors ==
On October 25, 2013, Small was inducted into the Illinois Golf Hall of Fame.

== Amateur wins ==
- 1984 Junior Masters
- 1987 Butler National Intercollegiate, Michigan State Spartan Classic

== Professional wins (35) ==
=== Nike Tour wins (2) ===
No.	Date	Tournament	Winning score	Margin of victory	Runner(s)-up
1	Mar 16, 1997	Nike Monterrey Open	−18 (68-67-68-67=270)	1 stroke	(United States) Mark Carnevale, (United States) Chris DiMarco, (United States) Brian Kamm
2	Jun 22, 1997	Nike Cleveland Open	−18 (67-70-67-66=270)	1 stroke	(United States) Patrick Sheehan

=== Hooters Tour wins (1) ===
No.	Date	Tournament	Winning score	Margin of victory	Runner-up
1	May 7, 1995	Hooters Dallas Classic	−12 (67-65=132) (Note: Shortened to 36 holes due to weather.)	Playoff	(United States) Rick Cramer

=== Other wins (23) ===
- 2001 Illinois PGA Championship
- 2003 Illinois PGA Championship, Illinois Open Championship
- 2004 Illinois PGA Championship
- 2005 Illinois PGA Championship, Illinois Open Championship, PGA Club Professional Championship
- 2006 Illinois PGA Championship, Illinois Open Championship
- 2007 Illinois PGA Championship, Illinois Open Championship, Illinois PGA Match Play Championship
- 2008 Illinois PGA Championship
- 2009 Illinois PGA Championship, PGA Professional National Championship
- 2010 Illinois PGA Championship, PGA Professional National Championship
- 2013 Illinois PGA Championship
- 2014 Illinois PGA Championship
- 2016 Illinois PGA Championship
- 2020 Illinois PGA Championship
- 2023 Illinois PGA Championship
- 2026 Iowa Open

=== Other senior wins (9) ===
- 2017 Illinois Senior PGA Championship
- 2018 Illinois Senior PGA Championship
- 2019 Illinois Senior PGA Championship
- 2020 Illinois Senior PGA Championship
- 2021 Illinois Senior PGA Championship
- 2022 Illinois Senior Open
- 2023 Illinois Senior PGA Championship, Illinois Senior Open
- 2025 Illinois Senior Open

== Results in major championships ==
Tournament	1994	1995	1996	1997	1998	1999
U.S. Open	CUT				CUT	
PGA Championship						

Tournament	2000	2001	2002	2003	2004	2005	2006	2007	2008	2009
U.S. Open								CUT		
PGA Championship					CUT	76	CUT	T69		CUT

Tournament	2010	2011	2012	2013	2014	2015	2016	2017
U.S. Open								
PGA Championship	CUT	T69	CUT	CUT				CUT

Did not play

CUT = missed the half-way cut
"T" = tied
Note: Small never played in the Masters Tournament or The Open Championship.

== U.S. national team appearances ==
- PGA Cup: 2005, 2007 (winners), 2009 (winners), 2011 (winners), 2013 (tie)

== See also ==
- 1997 Nike Tour graduates
