= Korn Ferry Tour Championship =

Tournament information
- Location: Glen Allen, Virginia
- Established: 1993
- Course: The Federal Club
- Par: 71
- Length: 7,073 yards (6,468 m)
- Tour: Korn Ferry Tour
- Format: Stroke play
- Prize fund: US$1,500,000
- Month played: October

Tournament record score
- Aggregate: 260 Jonathan Byrd (2017)
- To par: −24 as above

Current champion
- (United States) Austin Hitt

Location map
- Location in the United States Location in Virginia

The Korn Ferry Tour Championship presented by Virginia’s Richmond Region is the year-end golf tournament of the Korn Ferry Tour. It has been played at a variety of courses; from 2019 to 2023 it was played at Victoria National Golf Club in Newburgh, Indiana. from 2024 to 2025, it was played at the Pete Dye Course at French Lick Resort. Starting in 2026, it will be played at the Federal Club in Glen Allen, Virginia in partnership with Henrico County and Virginia state Economic Development Authority and tourism boards. Since the 2008 edition, the purse has been $1,000,000, with the winner receiving $180,000.

The format of the tournament is stroke play at 18 holes for four days, a total of 72 holes. Originally, the field consisted of the top 60 players on the money list, all attempting to be among the 25 to earn PGA Tour cards. Since 2013, it has been part of the Korn Ferry Tour Finals and the field consisted of the top 75 players from the Korn Ferry Tour money list and the non-exempt players ranked 126 to 200 on the PGA Tour's money list at the start of the Finals. From 2013 to 2022, 50 PGA Tour cards were awarded after the event.

The format changed in 2023 where thirty PGA Tour cards are awarded at the end of the season and again in 2025 where the number of graduates was reduced to twenty. In 2026, the field was reduced from 75 to 60. The Tour Championship features the top 60 players from the Korn Ferry standings and those in the field are guaranteed at minimum full Korn Ferry Tour status for the next season.

== Tournament host courses ==
Years	Venue	Location
2026–2029	The Federal Club	Glen Allen, Virginia
2024–2025	French Lick Resort	French Lick, Indiana
2019–2023	Victoria National Golf Club	Newburgh, Indiana
2016–2018	Atlantic Beach Country Club	Atlantic Beach, Florida
2013–2015	TPC Sawgrass, Dye's Valley Course	Ponte Vedra Beach, Florida
2009–2011	Daniel Island Club (Ralston Creek course)	Charleston, South Carolina
2008, 2012	TPC Craig Ranch	McKinney, Texas
2007	Barona Creek Golf Club	Lakeside, California
2006	Houstonian Golf & Country Club	Richmond, Texas
2001–2005	Robert Trent Jones Golf Trail at Capitol Hill (Senator course)	Prattville, Alabama
1999–2000	Robert Trent Jones Golf Trail at Highland Oaks	Dothan, Alabama
1998	Robert Trent Jones Golf Trail at Magnolia Grove (Crossings course)	Mobile, Alabama
1997	Grand National Golf Club (Lake course)	Opelika, Alabama
1995–1996	Settindown Creek Golf Club	Roswell, Georgia
1993–1994	Pumpkin Ridge Golf Club	Cornelius, Oregon

== Winners ==
Korn Ferry Tour (Current Finals system)	2023–
Korn Ferry Tour (Old Finals system)	2013–2019, 2021–2022
Korn Ferry Tour (Championship Series)	2020
Korn Ferry Tour (Regular season Tour Championship)	1993–2012

#	Year	Winner	Score	To par	Margin of victory	Runner(s)-up
Korn Ferry Tour Championship
34th	2026	(United States) Austin Hitt	264	−20	2 strokes	(United States) Blades Brown
33rd	2025	(United States) Chandler Blanchet	274	−14	2 strokes	(South Africa) Barend Botha
32nd	2024	(United States) Braden Thornberry	279	−9	1 stroke	(United States) Brian Campbell (United States) Alistair Docherty (United States) Doc Redman
31st	2023	(France) **Paul Barjon**	274	−14	3 strokes	(Argentina) Fabián Gómez
30th	2022	(United States) Justin Suh	267	−21	2 strokes	(United States) Austin Eckroat
29th	2021	(United States) Joseph Bramlett	268	−20	4 strokes	(United States) Trey Mullinax
28th	2020	(United States) **Brandon Wu**	270	−18	1 stroke	(United States) **Greyson Sigg**
27th	2019	(England) Tom Lewis	265	−23	5 strokes	(Argentina) Fabián Gómez
Web.com Tour Championship
26th	2018	(United States) Denny McCarthy	261	−23	4 strokes	(United States) Lucas Glover
25th	2017	(United States) Jonathan Byrd	260	−24	4 strokes	(United States) Sam Saunders (United States) Shawn Stefani
24th	2016	Canceled due to Hurricane Matthew				
23rd	2015	(Argentina) Emiliano Grillo	266	−14	1 stroke	(United States) Chez Reavie
22nd	2014	(United States) Derek Fathauer	266	−14	1 stroke	(United States) Zac Blair
21st	2013	(United States) Chesson Hadley	270	−10	2 strokes	(Canada) Brad Fritsch (Australia) Scott Gardiner (United States) John Peterson (United States) Brendon Todd
20th	2012	(United States) **Justin Bolli**	268	−16	2 strokes	(United States) **James Hahn**
Nationwide Tour Championship
19th	2011	(United States) **Ken Duke**	278	−10	2 strokes	(United States) **Scott Brown**
18th	2010	(United States) **Brendan Steele**	275	−13	Playoff	(United States) **Colt Knost**
17th	2009	(United States) **Matt Every**	267	−21	3 strokes	(Australia) **Michael Sim**
16th	2008	(United States) **Matt Bettencourt**	267	−17	1 stroke	(United States) **Jeff Klauk**
15th	2007	(Wales) **Richard Johnson**	264	−20	1 stroke	(United States) **Michael Letzig**
14th	2006	(United States) **Craig Kanada**	275	−13	1 stroke	(Australia) **Andrew Buckle** (United States) **Matt Kuchar**
13th	2005	(United States) **David Branshaw**	276	−12	2 strokes	(United States) **Eric Axley**
12th	2004	(United States) **Nick Watney**	273	−15	3 strokes	(United States) **Brett Wetterich**
11th	2003	(United States) **Chris Couch**	270	−18	3 strokes	(United States) **D. J. Brigman**
Buy.com Tour Championship
10th	2002	(United States) **Patrick Moore**	206 (Note: Shortened to 54 holes due to rain.)	−10	2 strokes	(New Zealand) **Steven Alker** (United States) Mike Heinen (United States) Jeff Klauk
9th	2001	(United States) **Pat Bates**	284	−4	3 strokes	(United States) Tom Carter (South Africa) **Brenden Pappas**
8th	2000	(United States) **Spike McRoy**	272	−16	5 strokes	(United States) **Briny Baird**
Nike Tour Championship
7th	1999	(United States) **Bob Heintz**	283	−5	Playoff	(United States) **Marco Dawson**
6th	1998	(United States) **Bob Burns**	283	−5	3 strokes	(United States) Jeff Gove
5th	1997	(United States) **Steve Flesch**	278	−10	4 strokes	(United States) **Chris Smith**
4th	1996	(United States) **Stewart Cink**	281	−7	4 strokes	(United States) **David Berganio Jr.**
3rd	1995	(United States) **Allen Doyle**	283	−5	Playoff	(United States) John Maginnes
2nd	1994	(United States) Mike Schuchart	277	−11	1 stroke	(United States) **Emlyn Aubrey** (United States) Jeff Cook (United States) Lee Rinker
1st	1993	(United States) David Duval	277	−7	1 stroke	(United States) Danny Briggs

Bolded golfers graduated to the PGA Tour via the Korn Ferry Tour regular-season money list, in years that the event was not part of the old Korn Ferry Tour Finals system. In years that the event was part of that system, all winners and runners-up earned PGA Tour cards.
Note: Green highlight indicates scoring records.
