= Bronson La'Cassie =

Professional golfer

Personal information
- Nationality: Australia
- Born: 15 April 1983 (age 43) Brisbane, Australia
- Height: 1.83 m (6 ft 0 in)
- Weight: 85 kg (187 lb; 13.4 st)

Career
- Sport: Golf
- College: University of Minnesota
- Turned professional: 2007
- Current tours: Web.com Tour; PGA Tour of Australasia
- Former tour: PGA Tour
- Professional wins: 2

Number of wins by tour
- Korn Ferry Tour: 1
- Other: 1

Bronson La'Cassie (born 15 April 1983) is an Australian professional golfer. He is best known for his win at the 2006 Western Amateur.

== Early life ==
La'Cassie was born in Brisbane, Australia. During his adolescent years Bronson played for the Queensland State Team, which finished second in 2002, as well as playing for the Australian Honorary School Team. He graduated from Kelvin Grove State High School in 1999, earning both his higher and lower school certificates.

== Amateur career ==
In 2003 La'Cassie began his freshman year at the University of Minnesota, after being noticed for his considerable golf skills. He was named the fourth "Big Ten Freshman" of the school. During his 2005–2006 junior season he was awarded the Les Bolstad award for lowest scoring average in the Big Ten, being the fourth Gopher to ever win the award. In 2006 he won the Western Amateur, a leading annual amateur event, after defeating Oklahoma State's Pablo Martín, 2 and 1.

La'Cassie currently holds an Australian higher and lower school certificate, as well as a major in business and marketing which he earned while at the University of Minnesota. He attributes his most memorable sporting moment to playing in the Australian Open.

== Professional career ==
La'Cassie played on the Web.com Tour in 2013. He won the last regular-season event, the Cox Classic, to move to sixth on the regular-season money list and earn his 2014 PGA Tour card.

== Professional wins (2) ==
=== Web.com Tour wins (1) ===
No.	Date	Tournament	Winning score	To par	Margin of victory	Runner-up
1	25 Aug 2013	Cox Classic	66-65-65-67=263	−21	Playoff	(United States) Matt Bettencourt

Web.com Tour playoff record (1–0)

No.	Year	Tournament	Opponent	Result
1	2013	Cox Classic	(United States) Matt Bettencourt	Won with par on third extra hole

=== NGA Hooters Tour wins (1) ===
No.	Date	Tournament	Winning score	To par	Margin of victory	Runner-up
1	17 May 2009	Sunset Hills NGA Classic	67-71-72-69=279	−9	Playoff	(United States) Kelly Grunewald

== Team appearances ==
Amateur

- Australian Men's Interstate Teams Matches (representing Queensland): 2002

== See also ==
- 2013 Web.com Tour Finals graduates
