= David Branshaw =

American professional golfer

Personal information
- Full name: David Sean Branshaw
- Nationality: United States
- Born: September 25, 1969 (age 57) Oswego, New York, U.S.
- Height: 5 ft 10 in (1.78 m)
- Weight: 165 lb (75 kg; 11.8 st)

Career
- Sport: Golf
- College: Bridgewater College
- Turned professional: 1991
- Current tour: PGA Tour Champions
- Former tours: PGA Tour; Nationwide Tour
- Professional wins: 2

Number of wins by tour
- Korn Ferry Tour: 2

David Sean Branshaw (born September 25, 1969) is an American professional golfer who plays on the PGA Tour Champions. He formerly played on the PGA Tour and the Nationwide Tour (now known as the Korn Ferry Tour).

== Career ==
Branshaw was born in Oswego, New York. He turned professional in 1991, and competed on the Nationwide Tour in 1997, 2002, 2003, and 2005. In 2003, he earned his PGA Tour card by finishing T4 at Q-School. Branshaw struggled in his first year on Tour, and failed to retain his playing card. In 2005, Branshaw finished 7th on the Nationwide Tour money list and regained a spot on the PGA Tour with a win at the 2005 Nationwide Tour Championship.

Branshaw did not play again on the PGA Tour after 2007, when he made only 10 cuts in 30 events and lost his tour card. He played on the Nationwide Tour full-time after that. In 2008, he lost to Ryan Hietala in a playoff in the Cox Classic.

In December 2021, Branshaw secured his card on the PGA Tour Champions through Q-School.

== Professional wins (2) ==
=== Nationwide Tour wins (2) ===
Legend
Tour Championships (1)
Other Nationwide Tour (1)

| No. | Date | Tournament | Winning score | Margin of victory | Runner(s)-up |
|---|---|---|---|---|---|
| 1 | Oct 13, 2002 | Gila River Classic | −22 (65-61-64-72=262) | 6 strokes | (Australia) Aaron Baddeley, (United States) Charles Raulerson |
| 2 | Oct 30, 2005 | Nationwide Tour Championship | −12 (71-65-69-71=276) | 2 strokes | (United States) Eric Axley |

Nationwide Tour playoff record (0–2)

| No. | Year | Tournament | Opponent(s) | Result |
|---|---|---|---|---|
| 1 | 2008 | Cox Classic | (United States) Ryan Hietala | Lost to par on first extra hole |
| 2 | 2010 | Chattanooga Classic | (United States) Joe Affrunti, (Australia) Scott Gardiner | Gardiner won with birdie on fourth extra hole Branshaw eliminated by birdie on first hole |

== See also ==
- 2003 PGA Tour Qualifying School graduates
- 2005 Nationwide Tour graduates
