= Bob O'Connor Golf Course at Schenley Park =

Golf course in Pittsburgh, Pennsylvania

- Location within Pittsburgh
- 40°26′12″N 79°56′11″W

Club information
- Established: 1897
- Type: public
- Operator: The First Tee
- Total holes: 18
- Website: http://www.thebobgc.com/
- Par: 67
- Length: 4,620
- Course rating: 63.3
- Slope rating: 104

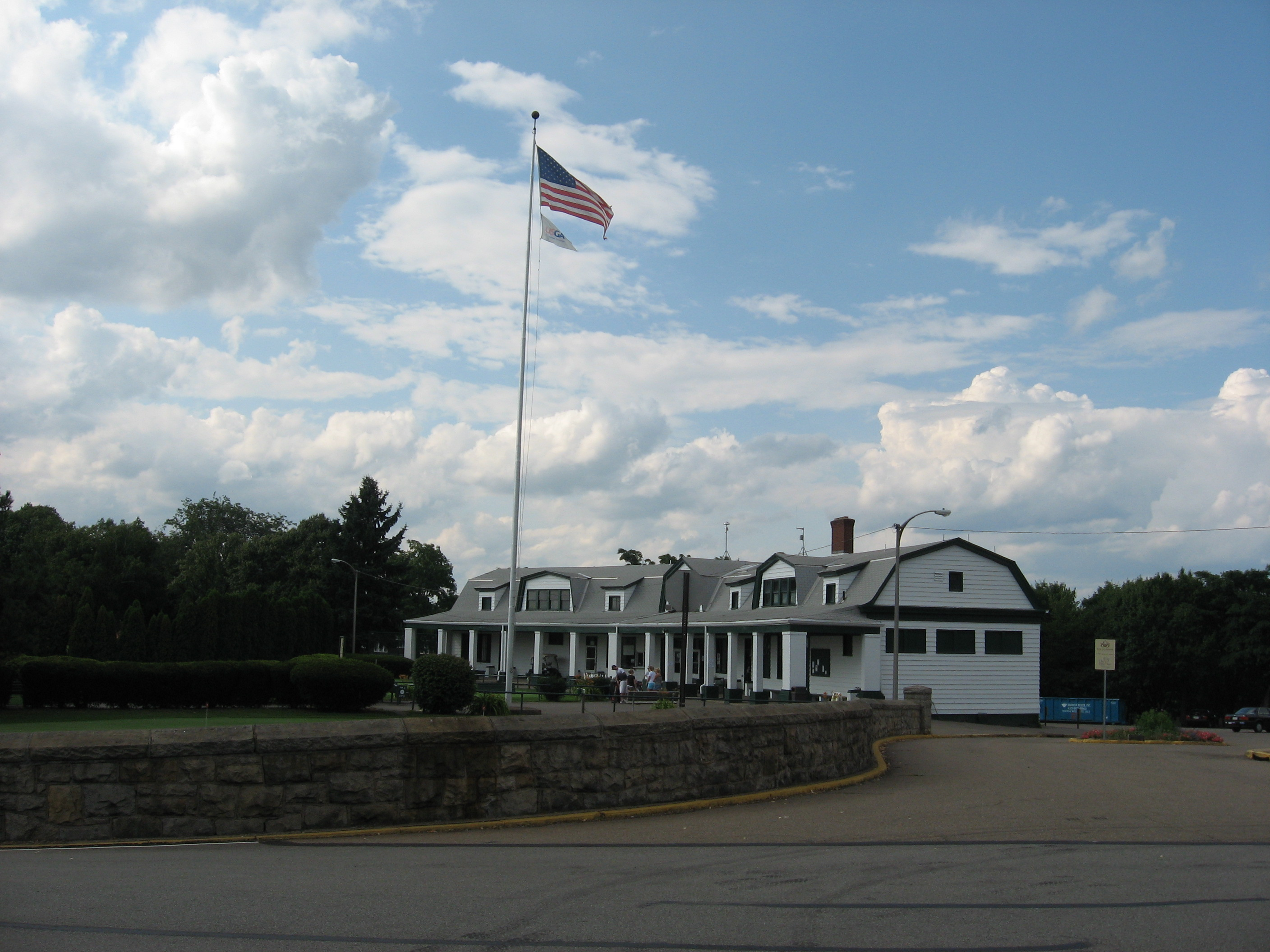
Clubhouse at the Bob O'Connor Golf Course

The Bob O'Connor Golf Course at Schenley Park, formerly known as the Schenley Park Golf Course, is located in the rolling hills of Schenley Park between Oakland and Squirrel Hill in Pittsburgh, Pennsylvania, United States. It is the only golf course within the city limits.

== History and design ==
Schenley Park Golf Course, established in 1902, is an eighteen-hole course. The course is open throughout the year, from early morning until after dark, weather permitting. Four full-sized indoor simulators are available whenever the golf course is open and after dark, by reservation. Individual and group lessons, equipment, pull-cart rentals and a fully stocked pro shop are available, as well as facilities for parties and meetings. It is operated by The First Tee.

The course is publicly owned by the city of Pittsburgh and leased to The First Tee who operates the course on the city's behalf, and was renamed for Bob O'Connor, a Pittsburgh mayor who liked to play the course and who died while in office in 2006.

In 2012, it was certified by the Audubon International as an Audubon Cooperative Sanctuary, meaning that it had met certain for conservation and wildlife protection requirements.
