= George Keyes =

American golfer (1919–2010)

George Keyes (September 17, 1919 – February 11, 2010) was an American professional golfer and two-time winner (1956 and 1967) of the Illinois PGA Championship.

Keyes served in the U.S. Army during World War II, seeing action in the Philippines.

== Professional wins ==
- 1955 Arizona Open
- 1956 Illinois PGA Championship
- 1967 Illinois PGA Championship
