= 1963 PGA Championship =

Tournament information
- Dates: July 18–21, 1963
- Location: Dallas, Texas; 32.841°N 96.645°W
- Courses: Dallas Athletic Club; Blue Course
- Organized by: PGA of America
- Tour: PGA Tour

Statistics
- Par: 71
- Length: 7,046 yards (6,443 m)
- Field: 165 players, 83 after cut
- Cut: 151 (+9)
- Prize fund: $80,900
- Winner's share: $13,000

Champion
- (United States) Jack Nicklaus
- 279 (−5)
- Location in the United States Location in Texas

The 1963 PGA Championship was the 45th PGA Championship, played July 18–21 at the Blue Course of Dallas Athletic Club in Dallas, Texas. Jack Nicklaus won the first of his five PGA Championship titles, two strokes ahead of runner-up Dave Ragan. It was the second major win of the year for Nicklaus, and the third of his eighteen major titles.

Nicklaus entered the final round in third place, three shots behind 54-hole leader Bruce Crampton. He shot a three-under 68 while Crampton fell back to third with 74 (+3) in the Texas heat, with temperatures over 100 °F (38 °C). At the trophy presentation in the bright sunshine, Nicklaus grasped the very hot Wanamaker Trophy with the aid of a towel. The temperature in downtown Dallas on Sunday reached a high of 110 °F (43 °C).

With the victory, Nicklaus at age 23 joined Gene Sarazen, Byron Nelson, and Ben Hogan as the only winners of all three American majors: the Masters, U.S. Open and PGA Championship. Nicklaus completed the first of his three career grand slams three years later at Muirfield in 1966.

The Open Championship was played the previous week in northwest England at Lytham St Annes, one of five times in the 1960s that these two majors were played in consecutive weeks in July. Nicklaus bogeyed the last two holes at Lytham and finished a stroke out of the 36-hole Saturday playoff, won by Bob Charles. The PGA Championship moved permanently to August in 1969 (except 1971, when it was played in late February to avoid Florida's summer). After cool temperatures in Britain, the oppressive July heat in Dallas was difficult for many to adjust to.

Nicklaus won the Masters in April, the first of his six green jackets, marking only the third time that the Masters champion won the PGA Championship in the same calendar year. He was preceded by Sam Snead in 1949 (May) and Jack Burke Jr. in 1956. Through 2016, it has been accomplished only four times, twice by Nicklaus, most recently 51 years ago in August 1975.

On Wednesday, Nicklaus set a record in the long drive contest at over 341 yards (312 m); breaking the record set in 1952 by twelve yards (11 m).

== Course layout ==
Hole	1	2	3	4	5	6	7	8	9	Out	10	11	12	13	14	15	16	17	18	In	Total
Yards	521	407	356	573	206	396	229	445	402	3,535	474	428	543	206	459	424	216	341	420	3,511	7,046
Par	5	4	4	5	3	4	3	4	4	36	4	4	5	3	4	4	3	4	4	35	71

== Round summaries ==
=== First round ===
Thursday, July 18, 1963

Place	Player	Score	To par
1	(United States) Dick Hart	66	−5
T2	(United States) Julius Boros	69	−2
T2	(New Zealand) Bob Charles	69	−2
T2	(United States) Shelley Mayfield	69	−2
T2	(United States) Jack Nicklaus	69	−2
T2	(United States) Mason Rudolph	69	−2
T7	(United States) Charles Congdon	70	−1
T7	(Australia) Bruce Crampton	70	−1
T7	(United States) Doug Ford	70	−1
T7	(United States) Bernie Haas	70	−1
T7	(United States) Tony Lema	70	−1
T7	(United States) Earl Stewart	70	−1

=== Second round ===
Friday, July 19, 1963

Place	Player	Score	To par
1	(United States) Dick Hart	66-72=138	−4
T2	(United States) Julius Boros	69-72=141	−1
T2	(United States) Tony Lema	70-71=141	−1
T2	(United States) Shelley Mayfield	69-72=141	−1
T5	(Spain) Manuel de la Torre	71-71=142	E
T5	(United States) Doug Ford	70-72=142	E
T5	(United States) Jack Nicklaus	69-73=142	E
T8	(Australia) Bruce Crampton	70-73=143	+1
T8	(United States) Bill Johnston	71-72=143	+1
T8	(United States) Gene Littler	71-72=143	+1
T8	(United States) Doug Sanders	74-69=143	+1

=== Third round ===
Saturday, July 20, 1963

Place	Player	Score	To par
1	(Australia) Bruce Crampton	70-73-65=208	−5
2	(United States) Dow Finsterwald	72-72-66=210	−3
3	(United States) Jack Nicklaus	69-73-69=211	−2
4	(United States) Dave Ragan	75-70-67=212	−1
T5	(United States) Doug Ford	70-72-71=213	E
T5	(United States) Billy Maxwell	73-71-69=213	E
T5	(United States) Doug Sanders	74-69-70=213	E
T8	(United States) Julius Boros	69-72-73=214	+1
T8	(United States) Al Geiberger	72-73-69=214	+1
T8	(United States) Dick Hart	66-72-76=214	+1
T8	(United States) Dave Hill	73-72-69=214	+1
T8	(United States) Sam Snead	71-73-70=214	+1

=== Final round ===
Sunday, July 21, 1963

Place	Player	Score	To par	Money ($)
1	(United States) Jack Nicklaus	69-73-69-68=279	−5	13,000
2	(United States) Dave Ragan	75-70-67-69=281	−3	7,000
T3	(Australia) Bruce Crampton	70-73-65-74=282	−2	3,750
T3	(United States) Dow Finsterwald	72-72-66-72=282	−2	3,750
T5	(United States) Al Geiberger	72-73-69-70=284	E	3,125
T5	(United States) Billy Maxwell	73-71-69-71=284	E	3,125
7	(Australia) Jim Ferrier	73-73-70-69=285	+1	2,750
T8	(United States) Gardner Dickinson	72-74-74-66=286	+2	2,090
T8	(United States) Tommy Jacobs	74-72-70-70=286	+2	2,090
T8	(United States) Bill Johnston	71-72-72-71=286	+2	2,090
T8	(South Africa) Gary Player	74-75-67-70=286	+2	2,090
T8	(United States) Art Wall Jr.	73-76-66-71=286	+2	2,090
