= Kevin Tway =

American professional golfer (born 1988)

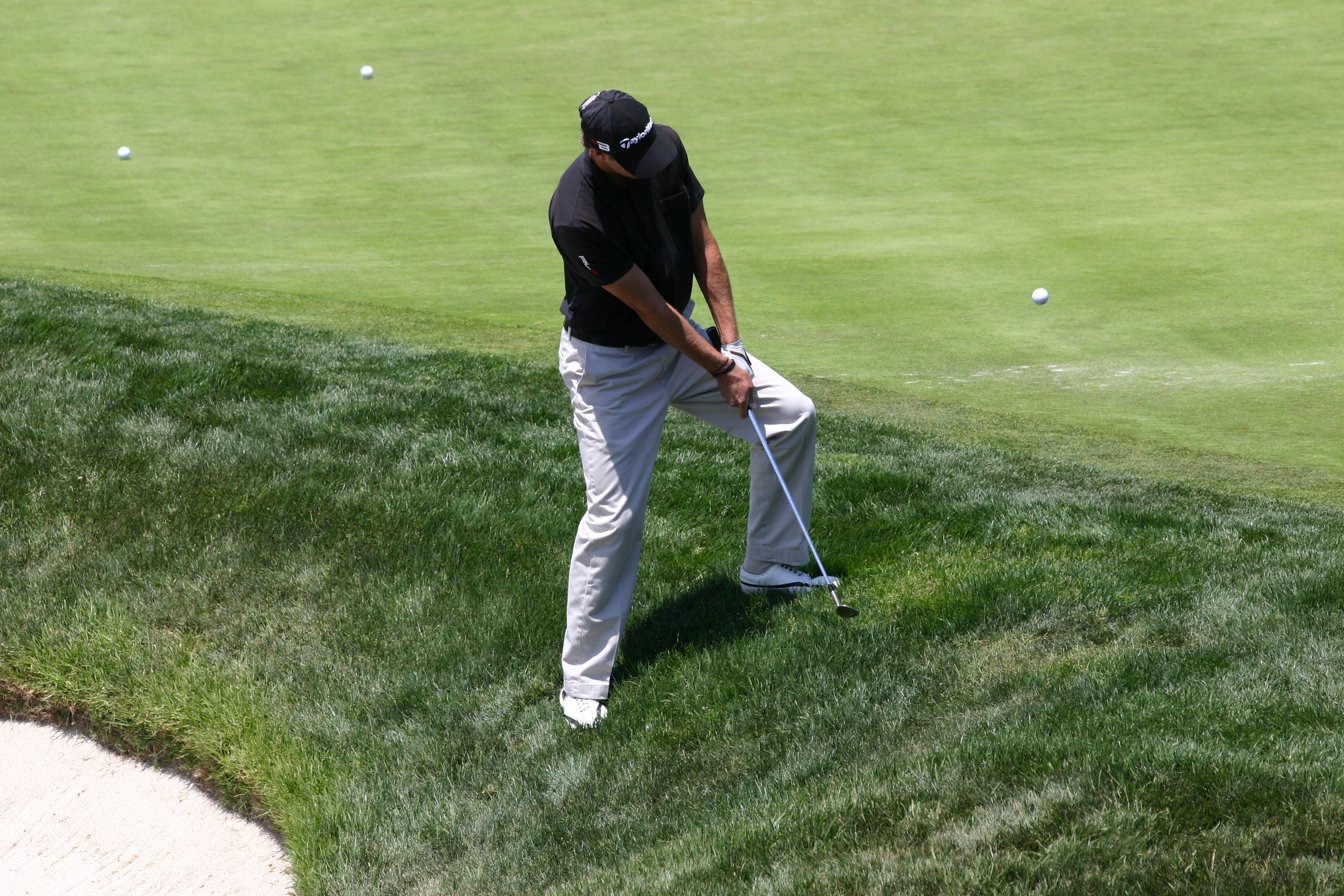
- Tway at the 2008 U.S. Open

Personal information
- Full name: Kevin Coulter Tway
- Nationality: United States
- Born: July 23, 1988 (age 38) Edmond, Oklahoma, U.S.
- Height: 6 ft 3 in (1.91 m)
- Weight: 185 lb (84 kg; 13.2 st)

Career
- Sport: Golf
- College: Oklahoma State
- Turned professional: 2011
- Current tour: PGA Tour
- Former tour: Web.com Tour
- Professional wins: 3
- Highest ranking: 81 (October 14, 2018) (as of October 25, 2026)

Number of wins by tour
- PGA Tour: 1
- Korn Ferry Tour: 1
- Other: 1

Best results in major championships
- Masters Tournament: T36: 2019
- PGA Championship: 77th: 2019
- U.S. Open: T60: 2014
- The Open Championship: DNP

Kevin Coulter Tway (born July 23, 1988) is an American professional golfer who has played on the Web.com Tour and the PGA Tour. He won numerous junior tournaments, and most notably, the 2005 U.S. Junior Amateur. Tway is the son of Bob Tway, an eight-time winner on the PGA Tour, including the PGA Championship in 1986. Following Kevin's maiden PGA Tour win at the Safeway Open in October 2018, they are one of only ten father-son pairs to have won PGA Tour events.

== Amateur career ==
Born in Edmond, Oklahoma, Tway attended Edmond North High School where he was named The Oklahoman's All-City Player of the Year in 2006 and 2007. He was a first-team American Junior Golf Association All-American in 2006 and was a second-team pick in 2005. He won the Oklahoma Class 6A individual title in 2006 and 2007. Tway won the 2005 U.S. Junior Amateur and advanced to the semifinals the following year.

Tway played college golf at Oklahoma State. In his freshman year, he won the NCAA Central Regional and was named honorable mention All-American, first-team All-Big 12 and was selected to the All-Central Region squad.

Tway qualified for the 2008 U.S. Open at Torrey Pines but he failed to make the cut by four strokes after posting rounds of 75 and 78. Tway lost in the round of 16 at the 2008 U.S. Amateur to Derek Fathauer.

== Professional career ==
Tway turned professional in 2011 after graduating from Oklahoma State. He made his professional debut at the 2011 Travelers Championship, with his father caddying for him. He played on the Web.com Tour in 2013 and picked up his first win in July at the Albertsons Boise Open, defeating Spencer Levin on the first playoff hole with a birdie. Both had shot a tournament record 261 (–23). Tway finished 5th on the regular season money list to earn his PGA Tour card for 2014.

During the 2014 season, Tway made only eight cuts in 23 events with no top-10 finishes. His best finish was a tie for 26th at the 2014 Travelers Championship, and he finished the season 177th in FedEx Cup points, losing his PGA Tour card. Back on the Web.com Tour in 2015, Tway carded two top-10s, with a runner-up finish at the Mexico Championship, but he finished 28th on the money list; three spots shy of regaining his PGA Tour card.

In 2016, Tway returned to the Web.com Tour and his results improved from the previous season. He scored four top-10s in 20 starts, including a solo third at the Price Cutter Charity Championship, but he still finished the regular season money list a few spots shy of automatically earning his card in 27th. However, during the 2016 Web.com Tour Finals, Tway performed well, including a tie for third at the Nationwide Children's Hospital Championship, which earned him back his PGA Tour card for 2017.

In 2017, Tway's season began with a slow start without having a top-30 finish in his first eleven starts, but in April, Tway knocked off three consecutive top-5s, finishing T3 at the Valero Texas Open, solo 3rd at the Zurich Classic of New Orleans (partnering with Kelly Kraft), and T5 at the Wells Fargo Championship. Tway also moved from 175th in the FedEx Cup to 55th in those events, virtually locking up his Tour card for the next season. He made the playoffs for the first time and finished the season 69th in points, easily retaining his card for 2018.

Tway had a solid 2018 season, making 26 of 33 cuts and scoring three top-10s. Again, Kevin had a great spring with T9 at the AT&T Byron Nelson, top-5 at the Fort Worth Invitational, and T6 at the Travelers Championship. He made the playoffs for a second consecutive year and finished 87th in points, again easily retaining his PGA Tour card for the next season.

On October 7, 2018 (beginning of 2019 season), Tway won the Safeway Open, for his first career PGA Tour victory, in a playoff over Brandt Snedeker and Ryan Moore. Tway birdied the last two holes in regulation to join a three-man playoff. Tway and Moore both birdied the first playoff hole, however Snedeker made par, eliminating him from the playoff. The next hole, Tway and Moore both birdied, forcing a third playoff hole. On the third playoff hole, Tway won with a 10 foot birdie putt.

On December 15, 2019, Tway won the QBE Shootout with partner Rory Sabbatini.

== Amateur wins ==
- 2005 U.S. Junior Amateur, Wildcat Golf/Wichita Junior Championship
- 2006 OSSO Junior at Oak Tree
- 2010 Players Amateur

== Professional wins (3) ==
=== PGA Tour wins (1) ===
No.	Date	Tournament	Winning score	To par	Margin of victory	Runners-up
1	Oct 7, 2018	Safeway Open	68-67-68-71=274	−14	Playoff	(United States) Ryan Moore, (United States) Brandt Snedeker

PGA Tour playoff record (1–0)

No.	Year	Tournament	Opponents	Result
1	2018	Safeway Open	(United States) Ryan Moore, (United States) Brandt Snedeker	Won with birdie on third extra hole Snedeker eliminated by par on first hole

=== Web.com Tour wins (1) ===
No.	Date	Tournament	Winning score	To par	Margin of victory	Runner-up
1	Jul 28, 2013	Albertsons Boise Open	65-69-63-64=261	−23	Playoff	(United States) Spencer Levin

Web.com Tour playoff record (1–0)

No.	Year	Tournament	Opponent	Result
1	2013	Albertsons Boise Open	(United States) Spencer Levin	Won with birdie on first extra hole

=== Other wins (1) ===
No.	Date	Tournament	Winning score	To par	Margin of victory	Runners-up
1	15 Dec 2019	QBE Shootout (with (Slovakia) Rory Sabbatini)	58-67-60=185	−31	2 strokes	(United States) Jason Kokrak and (United States) J. T. Poston

== Results in major championships ==
Tournament	2008	2009	2010	2011	2012	2013	2014	2015	2016	2017	2018
Masters Tournament											
U.S. Open	CUT						T60		CUT		
The Open Championship											
PGA Championship											

Tournament	2019
Masters Tournament	T36
PGA Championship	77
U.S. Open	
The Open Championship	

Did not play

CUT = missed the half-way cut
"T" = Tied

== Results in The Players Championship ==
Tournament	2018	2019	2020	2021	2022	2023
The Players Championship	T46	CUT	C		CUT	CUT

Did not play

CUT = missed the halfway cut
"T" indicates a tie for a place
C = Canceled after the first round due to the COVID-19 pandemic

== Results in World Golf Championships ==
Tournament	2019
Championship	
Match Play	
Invitational	63
Champions	T60

Did not play

"T" = Tied

== See also ==
- 2013 Web.com Tour Finals graduates
- 2016 Web.com Tour Finals graduates
