= 1989 PGA Championship =

Coordinates: 42.209°N 88.038°W

Tournament information
- Dates: August 10–13, 1989
- Location: Long Grove, Illinois
- Course(s): Kemper Lakes Golf Club
- Organized by: PGA of America
- Tour(s): PGA Tour

Statistics
- Par: 72
- Length: 7,197 yards (6,581 m)
- Field: 156 players, 70 after cut
- Cut: 145 (+1)
- Prize fund: $1.2 million
- Winner's share: $200,000

Champion
- (United States) Payne Stewart
- 276 (−12)

Location in the United States
Location in Illinois

The 1989 PGA Championship was the 71st PGA Championship, held August 10–13 at Kemper Lakes Golf Club in Long Grove, Illinois, northwest of Chicago. Payne Stewart won the first of his three major championships, one stroke ahead of runners-up Andy Bean, Mike Reid, and Curtis Strange.

Weather stopped play on Friday and Saturday with the rounds completed the following morning. In the last pairing, Reid played the final nine holes of the third round on Sunday morning. He nearly led wire-to-wire, but struggled on the final three holes, all with water in play. His tee shot at the 16th hole was pushed and found the water hazard, and he made bogey. On the par-3 17th, Reid stayed dry but misplayed a greenside chip shot from thick rough, then three-putted for double bogey and lost the lead. He had a 7-foot (2 m) birdie putt on the final hole to force a playoff, but did not convert. Stewart was five-under on the final nine and birdied four of the final five holes.

Four months earlier at the Masters, Reid led with five holes to play, but finished sixth after finding water at the 15th hole.

In search of a PGA Championship victory to complete a career grand slam, both Tom Watson and Arnold Palmer were on the first page of the leaderboard after the first round, with 67 and 68, respectively. Watson, 39, tied for ninth at 281 (−7) while Palmer, 59, was well back at 293 (+5). It was the final time that Palmer made the cut at the PGA Championship, though he played in the next five. Watson finished as high as fifth in 1993, but also never secured the title.

== Venue ==
This was the first PGA Tour event at Kemper Lakes, a daily-fee course opened ten years earlier in 1979. It had previously hosted several editions of the PGA Grand Slam of Golf.

=== Course layout ===
Hole	1	2	3	4	5	6	7	8	9	Out	10	11	12	13	14	15	16	17	18	In	Total
Yards	406	391	173	508	442	180	557	421	448	3,526	453	534	393	219	420	578	469	172	433	3,671	7,197
Par	4	4	3	5	4	3	5	4	4	36	4	5	4	3	4	5	4	3	4	36	72

== Round summaries ==
=== First round ===
Thursday, August 10, 1989

Place	Player	Score	To par
T1	(United States) Mike Reid	66	−6
T1	(United States) Leonard Thompson	66	−6
T3	(United States) Tom Kite	67	−5
T3	(United States) Chris Perry	67	−5
T3	(United States) Tom Watson	67	−5
T6	(United States) Phil Blackmar	68	−4
T6	(United States) Ben Crenshaw	68	−4
T6	(United States) Jack Nicklaus	68	−4
T6	(United States) Mark O'Meara	68	−4
T6	(United States) Arnold Palmer	68	−4
T6	(United States) Dave Rummells	68	−4
T6	(Wales) Ian Woosnam	68	−4

=== Second round ===
Friday, August 11, 1989
Saturday, August 12, 1989

Place	Player	Score	To par
1	(United States) Mike Reid	66-67=133	−11
T2	(United States) Leonard Thompson	66-69=135	−9
T2	(United States) Craig Stadler	71-64=135	−9
4	(United States) Tom Watson	67-69=136	−8
T5	(United States) Andy Bean	70-67=137	−7
T5	(United States) Ed Fiori	70-67=137	−7
T5	(United States) Chris Perry	67-70=137	−7
T5	(United States) Dave Rummells	68-69=137	−7
T9	(United States) Scott Hoch	69-69=138	−6
T9	(United States) Curtis Strange	70-68=138	−6
T9	(Wales) Ian Woosnam	68-70=138	−6

=== Third round ===
Saturday, August 12, 1989
Sunday, August 13, 1989

Place	Player	Score	To par
1	(United States) Mike Reid	66-67-70=203	−13
2	(United States) Dave Rummells	68-69-69=206	−10
T3	(United States) Scott Hoch	69-69-69=207	−9
T3	(United States) Chris Perry	67-70-70=207	−9
T3	(United States) Craig Stadler	71-64-72=207	−9
T6	(Japan) Isao Aoki	72-71-65=208	−8
T6	(Spain) Seve Ballesteros	72-70-66=208	−8
T6	(United States) Curtis Strange	70-68-70=208	−8
T6	(Wales) Ian Woosnam	68-70-70=208	−8
T10	(United States) Payne Stewart	74-66-69=209	−7
T10	(United States) Mike Sullivan	76-66-67=209	−7

=== Final round ===
Sunday, August 13, 1989

Place	Player	Score	To par	Money ($)
1	(United States) Payne Stewart	74-66-69-67=276	−12	200,000
T2	(United States) Andy Bean	70-67-74-66=277	−11	83,333
T2	(United States) Mike Reid	66-67-70-74=277	−11	83,333
T2	(United States) Curtis Strange	70-68-70-69=277	−11	83,333
5	(United States) Dave Rummells	68-69-69-72=278	−10	45,000
6	(Wales) Ian Woosnam	68-70-70-71=279	−9	40,000
T7	(United States) Scott Hoch	69-69-69-73=280	−8	36,250
T7	(United States) Craig Stadler	71-64-72-73=280	−8	36,250
T9	(England) Nick Faldo	70-73-69-69=281	−7	30,000
T9	(United States) Ed Fiori	70-67-75-69=281	−7	30,000
T9	(United States) Tom Watson	67-69-74-71=281	−7	30,000

=== Scorecard ===
Birdie	Bogey	Double bogey

Final round

Hole	1	2	3	4	5	6	7	8	9	10	11	12	13	14	15	16	17	18
Par	4	4	3	5	4	3	5	4	4	4	5	4	3	4	5	4	3	4
(United States) Stewart	−7	−7	−8	−8	−9	−8	−8	−8	−7	−7	−8	−8	−8	−9	−10	−11	−11	−12
(United States) Bean	−5	−6	−6	−7	−6	−6	−6	−7	−7	−7	−8	−9	−9	−9	−10	−10	−11	−11
(United States) Reid	−13	−13	−13	−13	−12	−12	−12	−12	−12	−13	−14	−14	−14	−14	−14	−13	−11	−11
(United States) Strange	−8	−8	−8	−8	−8	−9	−10	−10	−10	−11	−11	−11	−11	−11	−11	−11	−11	−11
(United States) Rummells	−10	−10	−9	−9	−10	−9	−10	−10	−9	−9	−9	−9	−9	−9	−9	−9	−9	−10

Cumulative tournament scores, relative to par
