= Rolling Green Country Club =

Country club in Arlington Heights, Illinois

Coordinates: 42°5′32″N 87°57′13″W

Rolling Green Country Club is a private country club in Arlington Heights, Illinois, with over 350 full golf members and 105 acres that contain a 71.5 rated golf course, swimming facilities, restaurant, bar, fitness center and skeet shooting range. Rolling Green is the only location in Arlington Heights, IL where firing a gun is legal.

== Early history ==
The club was founded on June 24, 1924, when a small group of suburban businessmen from the North Shore (Chicago) took an option on property owned by Dr. Oughton. They created an operation policy under a trust agreement and decided to call their new venture Rolling Green Country Club, which was named for the rolling terrain. In their first official board meeting, dues were set at $80. They also established a $2 guest fee for Saturdays, Sundays, and holidays, and $1 for weekdays. By this time, the group had grown to 100 men. It was decided later that membership would be limited to 350.

Dr. Oughton had originally commissioned Donald Ross, a noted golf architect to design the golf course, but later declared the task, “too easy” and took it upon himself to oversee construction and interpret the blueprints.

In the 1926–27 season, a brochure was published that stated that Rolling Green Country Club is situated on the highest peak of land in Cook County. It also added “the roll of the land makes the game of greater interest to the player, and the natural and artificial drainage makes the course playable even after the heaviest rains.”

Women have long been welcome at Rolling Green Country Club. In the spring of 1927, the Board hired Minnie Stiff as the manager of Rolling Green. Her husband Ed also became the club's engineer.

A playground was built in 1929 in a grove of trees, which included slides, swings, and sand boxes.

== Aquatics ==
In 2023, RG Splash started their recreational swim team, the Rolling Green Rays, founded by then Aquatics Director Annie Kamps.

== Golf ==
Rolling Green's 18-hole golf course that exists today was designed by William H. Diddel and has a course rating of 71.7 and a slope of 129.

In the 1970s, Rolling Green hosted several Western Open Qualifying Tournaments. It also continues to host Illinois PGA Tournaments.

Tournaments and league play are offered for both men and women throughout the golf season. Rolling Green also offers a Junior Golf Program in the summer.

== Awards and Recognitions ==
In 2013 and again in 2014, The Daily Herald's Reader's Choice Awards listed Rolling Green as one of the "Best Private Golf Courses".
