= Tony Holguin =

American golfer (1926–2009)

Personal information
- Nationality: United States
- Born: October 18, 1926
- Died: May 14, 2009 (aged 82) Oak Forest, Illinois, U.S.

Career
- Sport: Golf
- Turned professional: 1948
- Former tours: PGA Tour; Champions Tour
- Professional wins: 6

Number of wins by tour
- PGA Tour: 1

Best results in major championships
- Masters Tournament: T19: 1949
- PGA Championship: T17: 1955
- U.S. Open: 40th: 1956
- The Open Championship: DNP

Tony Holguin (October 18, 1926 – May 14, 2009) was an American professional golfer who played on the PGA Tour and the Senior PGA Tour.

== Early life and amateur career ==
Holguin learned the game of golf while growing up in San Antonio, Texas during the Great Depression. His family, which was of Mexican descent, had no money and could not afford an automobile. He spent much time at home, practicing his putting.

Holguin served in the U.S. Army during World War II. He won the San Antonio City Championship in 1946 and 1947.

== Professional career ==
In 1948, Holguin turned professional. He won the Mexican Open in 1949 and 1950. His best finish in a major championship was T17 at PGA Championship in 1957. The biggest win of his career came in 1953 at the Texas Open. In 1957, Holguin tied Arnold Palmer for third place in the Texas Open. His majors resume consists of three Masters, six U.S. Opens and eight PGA Championships.

In January 1954, at the opening round of the Bing Crosby National Pro-Am, Holguin set the course record of 63 at the Monterey Peninsula Country Club, now known as its Dunes Course.

Like most professional golfers of his generation, Holguin earned a living primarily as a club professional. In 1952, he became club pro at Midlothian (Illinois) Country Club. He also worked at Gleneagles Country Club in Lemont, Illinois and Balmoral Woods Country Club in Crete, Illinois.

Holguin was the spokesman for Fairwinds, a failed development that included a Holiday Inn and future golf course. He also was to be the teaching professional at Fairwinds. A golf course was built after the development failed, which became Balmoral Woods CC.

== Awards and honors ==
In 2007, he was inducted into the Illinois Section PGA Hall of Fame.

== Amateur wins ==
- 1946 San Antonio City Championship
- 1947 San Antonio City Championship

== Professional wins ==
=== PGA Tour wins (1) ===
- 1953 Texas Open

=== Other wins ===
this list may be incomplete

- 1949 Mexican Open
- 1950 Mexican Open
- 1954 Illinois PGA Championship
- 1962 Illinois PGA Championship
- 1970 Illinois PGA Championship
