= Mexico Championship =

El Bosque Mexico Championship
Tournament information
- Location: León, Mexico
- Established: 2013
- Course: El Bosque Country Club
- Par: 72
- Length: 7,701 yards (7,042 m)
- Tour: Korn Ferry Tour
- Format: Stroke play
- Prize fund: US$650,000
- Month played: February/March
- Final year: 2020

Tournament record score
- Aggregate: 269 Wesley Bryan (2016)
- To par: −19 as above

Final champion
- (United States) David Kocher
- Location in Mexico Location in Guanajuato

The Mexico Championship is a golf tournament on the Korn Ferry Tour. It was first played in May 2013 at the El Bosque Country Club in León, Mexico.

The Mexican Open had been a Web.com Tour event from 2008 to 2012, and was played at El Bosque the last four of these years. When it became a PGA Tour Latinoamérica event in 2013, the Mexico Championship took its place on the Web.com schedule.

== Winners ==
Year	Winner	Score	To par	Margin of victory	Runner(s)-up
El Bosque Mexico Championship
2020	(United States) David Kocher	276	−12	Playoff	(France) Paul Barjon (United States) Chad Ramey
2019: No tournament
2018	(United States) Martin Trainer	274	−14	2 strokes	(United States) John Chin
2017	(United States) Matt Atkins	271	−17	3 strokes	(Colombia) Sebastián Muñoz
2016	(United States) Wesley Bryan	269	−19	4 strokes	(Canada) Brad Fritsch (United States) Richy Werenski
2015	(United States) Wes Roach	271	−17	4 strokes	(United States) Patton Kizzire (United States) Kevin Tway
2014	(Mexico) Carlos Ortiz	275	−13	2 strokes	(United States) Justin Thomas
Mexico Championship
2013	(United States) Michael Putnam	275	−13	2 strokes	(South Korea) Kim Meen-whee (United States) Alex Prugh (United States) Wes Roach
