= Dick Hart (golfer) =

American golfer (1935–2013)

Personal information
- Full name: Richard Byrd Hart
- Nationality: United States
- Born: October 20, 1935 Salem, Massachusetts, U.S.
- Died: April 10, 2013 (aged 77) Covington, Louisiana, U.S.

Career
- Sport: Golf
- Status: Professional
- Former tour: PGA Tour
- Professional wins: 6

Number of wins by tour
- PGA Tour: 1
- Other: 5

Best results in major championships
- Masters Tournament: DNP
- PGA Championship: T17: 1963
- U.S. Open: T44: 1965
- The Open Championship: DNP

Richard Byrd Hart (October 20, 1935 – April 10, 2013) was an American professional golfer who played on the PGA Tour in the 1960s.

== Career ==
At the 1963 PGA Championship, Hart led after both 18 and 36 holes (66 & 72) but faded in the third and fourth rounds (76 & 74) to finish the tournament at T-17 — his best finish in a major championship.

Hart's one tour victory came at the 1965 Azalea Open Invitational. He defeated Phil Rodgers on the eighth hole of a sudden death playoff. The playoff remains one of the longest in PGA Tour history.

A 43-year club pro at Hinsdale Golf Club in Hinsdale, Illinois.

== Personal life ==
In 2013, Hart died in Covington, Louisiana.

== Awards and honors ==
In 1990, Hart was inducted into the Illinois Golf Hall of Fame.

== Professional wins (6) ==
=== PGA Tour wins (1) ===
No.	Date	Tournament	Winning score	Margin of victory	Runner-up
1	Mar 21, 1965	Azalea Open Invitational	−12 (70-65-72-69=276)	Playoff	(United States) Phil Rodgers

PGA Tour playoff record (1–0)

No.	Year	Tournament	Opponent	Result
1	1965	Azalea Open Invitational	(United States) Phil Rodgers	Won with par on eighth extra hole

=== Other wins (5) ===
- 1963 Illinois PGA Championship
- 1964 Illinois Open
- 1966 Illinois PGA Championship
- 1969 Illinois Open
- 1971 Illinois Open
