= Victoria National Golf Course =

Golf course in Indiana, United States

Coordinates: 38.000718°N 87.346408°W

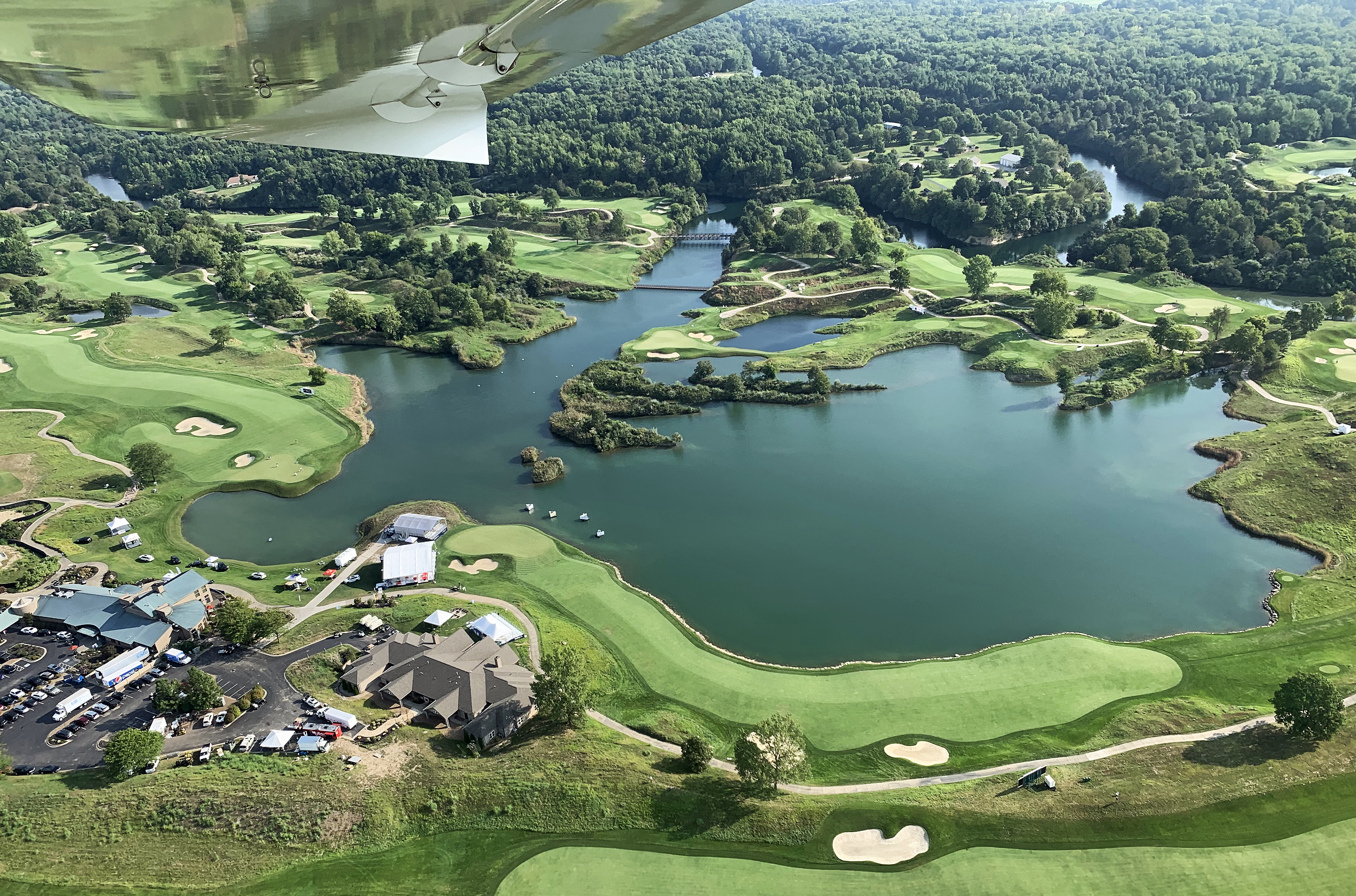
An aerial view of Victoria National Golf Club in Newburgh, Indiana. In the foreground is the 18th hole, with the clubhouse visible center-left.

Victoria National Golf Course (officially Victoria National Golf Club) is a private 18-hole golf course located northeast of Newburgh, Indiana, in the southwestern corner of the state, roughly seven miles east of Evansville. Victoria was designed by golf course architect Tom Fazio and constructed in 1996 on land that had been used for strip mines from the 1950s until 1977. Developed and initially owned by Terry Friedman and family, the course was sold to Victoria Partners LLC in 2010. In 2018 it was purchased by the Dormie Network.

As of August 2019, Victoria National is ranked as the 43rd best golf course in America, according to Golf Digest. Victoria is certified in Audubon International's Cooperative Sanctuary Program for Golf Courses.

== Tournaments hosted ==
Victoria National hosted its first high-profile tournament beginning in 2012; the Korn Ferry Tour's United Leasing Championship was held for seven seasons (2012–18). The tournament purse was over a half-million dollars, and the event was televised by the Golf Channel.

Following the 2018 season, Victoria National signed a 10-year deal to become home of the Korn Ferry Tour Championship.

Previously, Victoria hosted Legends Tour (the official senior tour of the LPGA) tournaments in 2003 and 2004, as well as the U.S. Senior Amateur in 2006.

== Course information ==
Victoria National has a clubhouse, pro shop, driving range, putting green, and restaurant.

Victoria National
Tee	Rating/Slope	1	2	3	4	5	6	7	8	9	Out	10	11	12	13	14	15	16	17	18	In	Total
Par		4	4	5	4	3	4	3	4	5	36	5	3	4	4	4	5	3	4	4	36	72
SI		5	17	1	11	13	7	15	9	3		6	18	12	14	2	4	16	10	8
Victorian	77.7/152.0	442	374	578	355	212	474	183	425	558	3,601	543	233	357	395	471	548	208	454	432	3,641	7,242
Tecumseh	75.4/150.0	413	356	539	338	187	432	166	407	407	3,245	526	203	343	390	443	535	194	428	406	3,468	6,713
Chinook	71.5/141.0	388	323	508	311	170	427	152	391	508	3,178	506	176	317	345	406	530	161	395	390	3,226	6,404
Combo	71.5/141.0	376	286	508	311	146	420	152	356	508	3,063	481	158	317	345	388	463	161	395	390	3,098	6,161
Ayrshire	70.4/137.0	376	286	467	293	146	420	142	356	472	2,958	481	158	293	295	388	463	139	377	338	2,932	5,890
Darlington (ladies)	71.2/131.0	329	197	427	266	109	272	124	311	403	2,438	444	119	278	272	347	418	95	309	290	2,572	5,010
