= Ben Martin (golfer) =

American professional golfer (born 1987)

Personal information
- Full name: Benjamin Walter Martin
- Nationality: United States
- Born: August 26, 1987 (age 39) Greenwood, South Carolina, U.S.
- Height: 5 ft 11 in (1.80 m)
- Weight: 175 lb (79 kg; 12.5 st)

Career
- Sport: Golf
- College: Clemson University
- Turned professional: 2010
- Current tour: Korn Ferry Tour
- Former tours: PGA Tour eGolf Professional Tour
- Professional wins: 4
- Highest ranking: 48 (May 24, 2015)

Number of wins by tour
- PGA Tour: 1
- Korn Ferry Tour: 2
- Other: 1

Best results in major championships
- Masters Tournament: CUT: 2010, 2015
- PGA Championship: CUT: 2014, 2015
- U.S. Open: T64: 2015
- The Open Championship: T26: 2014

Benjamin Walter Martin (born August 26, 1987) is an American professional golfer who plays on the PGA Tour.

== Professional career ==
As an amateur, Martin played in three major championships and was the runner-up at the 2009 U.S. Amateur. Having turned professional in 2010, he won in his second professional event, and finished runner-up at qualifying school for the PGA Tour at the end of the year.

In 2011 on the PGA Tour, Martin made the cut in 12 of 25 events and failed to earn enough money to retain his card for 2012. He played on the Web.com Tour in 2012 and 2013, picking up his first tour win at the 2013 United Leasing Championship. He finished second on the 2013 Web.com Tour regular season money list to earn his 2014 PGA Tour card. On October 19, 2014, Martin played the last four holes in 4-under-par, including a 46-foot eagle putt on the 16th hole to earn his first career PGA Tour win at the Shriners Hospitals for Children Open by two strokes over Kevin Streelman.

In 2014, Martin's second full season the PGA Tour, he finished 76th in the final FedEx Cup standings. He had three top-10 finishes on the season, including a solo third at the Puerto Rico Open and a tie for third at the RBC Heritage and the Quicken Loans National.

Martin's 2015 campaign got off to a quick start with a victory in his second event of the season at the Shriners Hospitals for Children Open, his first of his career. He then added top-10s at the Arnold Palmer Invitational, The Players Championship and the Crowne Plaza Invitational at Colonial.

== Professional wins (4) ==
=== PGA Tour wins (1) ===
No.	Date	Tournament	Winning score	Margin of victory	Runner-up
1	Oct 19, 2014	Shriners Hospitals for Children Open	−20 (68-66-62-68=264)	2 strokes	(United States) Kevin Streelman

=== Web.com Tour wins (2) ===
No.	Date	Tournament	Winning score	Margin of victory	Runner(s)-up
1	Jun 30, 2013	United Leasing Championship	−11 (69-72-68-67=277)	Playoff	(United States) Joe Affrunti, (Australia) Ashley Hall, (United States) Billy Hurley III
2	Aug 4, 2013	Mylan Classic	−17 (66-67-67-67=267)	5 strokes	(United States) Kelly Kraft

Web.com Tour playoff record (1–0)

No.	Year	Tournament	Opponents	Result
1	2013	United Leasing Championship	(United States) Joe Affrunti, (Australia) Ashley Hall, (United States) Billy Hurley III	Won with par on first extra hole

=== eGolf Professional Tour wins (1) ===
No.	Date	Tournament	Winning score	Margin of victory	Runner-up
1	Jul 24, 2010	Forest Oaks Classic	−20 (65-69-67-67=268)	Playoff	(United States) Brett Munson

== Results in major championships ==
Tournament	2009	2010	2011	2012	2013	2014	2015
Masters Tournament		CUT					CUT
U.S. Open	CUT	CUT					T64
The Open Championship						T26	T74
PGA Championship						CUT	CUT

Did not play

CUT = missed the half-way cut
"T" = tied

== Results in The Players Championship ==
Tournament	2015	2016	2017	2018	2019	2020	2021	2022	2023	2024
The Players Championship	T4	CUT	T30	CUT		C			T54	T31

Top 10

CUT = missed the halfway cut
"T" indicates a tie for a place
C = Canceled after the first round due to the COVID-19 pandemic

== Results in World Golf Championships ==
Tournament	2015
Championship	
Match Play	T17
Invitational	T57
Champions	

Did not play

"T" = Tied

== See also ==
- 2010 PGA Tour Qualifying School graduates
- 2013 Web.com Tour Finals graduates
- 2022 Korn Ferry Tour Finals graduates
