= Cox Classic =

Golf tournament in Nebraska, US

Coordinates: 41.287°N 96.127°W

Tournament information
- Location: Omaha, Nebraska, U.S.
- Established: 1996
- Course: Champions Club
- Par: 71
- Length: 7,145 yards (6,533 m)
- Tour: Web.com Tour
- Format: Stroke play
- Prize fund: US$800,000
- Month played: August
- Final year: 2013

Tournament record score
- Aggregate: 258 Chris Smith (1997)
- To par: −26 Chris Smith (1997) −26 Bo Van Pelt (2003)

Final champion
- (Australia) Bronson La'Cassie
- Location in the United States Location in Nebraska

The Cox Classic presented by Lexus of Omaha was a professional golf tournament in the central United States on the Web.com Tour. It was played annually for eighteen years at Champions Run in Omaha, Nebraska.

It debuted as the "Nike Omaha Classic" in 1996, with a purse of $200,000 and a winner's share of $36,000, won by Rocky Walcher on August 11. For its 18th and final edition in 2013, the purse had quadrupled to $800,000 and Bronson La'Cassie took the winner's share of $144,000 after three playoff holes.

The Web.com Tour returned to Omaha in 2017 with the Pinnacle Bank Championship, held at public Indian Creek Golf Course in July.

== Winners ==
Year	Winner	Score	To par	Margin of victory	Runner(s)-up
Cox Classic
2013	(Australia) Bronson La'Cassie	263	−21	Playoff	(United States) Matt Bettencourt
2012	(United States) Ben Kohles	260	−24	3 strokes	(South Africa) Dawie van der Walt
2011	(United States) J. J. Killeen	262	−22	1 stroke	(Sweden) Jonas Blixt (England) Gary Christian (United States) Ken Duke (New Zealand) Danny Lee
2010	(United States) Martin Piller	261	−23	2 strokes	(United States) Dicky Pride
2009	(United States) Rich Barcelo	264	−20	1 stroke	(United States) Tom Gillis
2008	(United States) Ryan Hietala	265	−19	Playoff	(United States) David Branshaw
2007	(United States) Roland Thatcher	260	−24	1 stroke	(Australia) Jason Day
2006	(United States) Johnson Wagner	263	−21	4 strokes	(United States) Craig Bowden
2005	(United States) Jason Gore	261	−23	Playoff	(United States) Roger Tambellini
2004	(United States) Charles Warren	267	−21	1 stroke	(United States) John Elliott
Omaha Classic
2003	(United States) Bo Van Pelt	262	−26	2 strokes	(South Africa) Craig Lile
2002	(United States) Jay Delsing	267	−21	1 stroke	(Australia) Anthony Painter
Buy.com Omaha Classic
2001	(United States) Heath Slocum	266	−22	1 stroke	(Australia) Rod Pampling
2000	(United States) David Berganio Jr.	268	−20	Playoff	(Canada) Ahmad Bateman
Nike Omaha Classic
1999	(Australia) Mathew Goggin	264	−24	4 strokes	(United States) Casey Martin
1998	(United States) Matt Gogel	271	−13	Playoff	(United States) Jay Williamson
1997	(United States) Chris Smith	258	−26	11 strokes	(United States) Barry Cheesman
1996	(United States) Rocky Walcher	267	−21	1 stroke	(United States) Michael Christie (United States) Steve Larick
