= Riverside Golf Club =

Private golf club located in North Riverside, Illinois

Riverside Golf Club is a private golf club located in North Riverside, Illinois, a near west suburb of Chicago, Illinois.

== History ==
Founded in 1893, Riverside Golf Club is one of the oldest golf clubs in the United States and was one of pioneering western clubs during the late 19th century. The original course was laid out in 1893 and the club was incorporated in 1897. The golf course straddles the banks of the Des Plaines River between Cermak Road and 26th Street. Though the course has changed and expanded over the years it is still located on substantially the same plot of land as in 1893. In 1899 the club was a founding member of the Western Golf Association.

Albert Seckel was Riverside's leading player during its early years, playing in numerous national tournaments. His most important win came at the 1911 Western Amateur contested at Detroit Golf Club. He also finished as runner-up in this event in 1909 and 1924.

In the late 1950s the club resisted and overcame a takeover attempt by the University of Illinois at Chicago where the school sought to relocate its campus from Navy Pier to the club's property.

The club was basis for the Mac Divot comic strip that was published in the 1960s and 1970s. Mac Divot was created by a member who worked for the Chicago Tribune. Many of the stories in the comic strip were based on real life characters and happenings at the club.

Riverside was a founding member of the Western Golf Association and is an active supporter of the Evans Scholarship Program, having given out 121 scholarships to caddies.

== Golf course ==
The original golf course consisted of 3 holes and was expanded to 5 holes later during the 1893 season. A nine-hole course was laid out by founding members William A. Havemeyer, J.S. Driver, and Thomas C. Hannah in 1894. Between 1896 and 1897 the course was expanded and revised, but remained a nine-hole track, and became known as one of the most beautiful and challenging in the west. As of 1901, the course played to a yardage of 3,217 yards with a bogey rating of 43.

In the early 1900s many clubs expanded their golf courses to 18 holes but Riverside did not follow suit. This caused the club to fall off the map a bit in terms of prestige and notoriety as it remained a 9-hole course. In the late teens the club purchased additional land adjacent to its original property, on the opposite side (east) of the Des Plaines River. The club built a new clubhouse on the river bank of the newly acquired land. In 1917-1919 William Langford designed a new 18 hole course, reshaping Riverside as one of the top courses in the area. Riverside was possibly one of Langford's first architectural works as it is attributed only to him and not his later partnership known as "Langford and Moreau".

During the 1980s the club secured an additional 25 acres of land east of the Des Plaines River and south of the rail line. Four new holes were added on this newly acquired tract which were designed by Dick Nugent and Associates. After these holes were completed 3 holes east of the clubhouse were removed and replaced by a practice facility and new 18th hole. The practice area and 18th hole were designed by Bob Lohmann. The course remained relatively unchanged during the 1990s through 2015.

In 2015 Chicago based architect David Esler oversaw a renovation of the golf course. All bunkers were returned to the original Langford style with grass faces, trees were removed, tee boxes were added, and some greens were expanded. Green expansion and restoration projects have continued on a less invasive basis during the succeeding years. From the championship tees, the current course plays to a par of 71 at 6,735 yards and has a course rating/slope of 73.4/136.

== Tournaments ==
The following is a partial list of various local, state, national, and qualifying tournaments hosted by the club:

- 1928 U.S. Open Qualifying
- 1932 Chicago Women's District Golf Association Championship
- 1940 C.D.G.A. Amateur
- 1950 U.S. Amateur Qualifying
- 1958 U.S. Junior Amateur Qualifying
- 1960 U.S. Junior Amateur Qualifying
- 1967 U.S. Junior Amateur Qualifying
- 1968 Illinois Open
- 2007 U.S. Open Sectional Qualifying
- 2008 C.D.G.A. Amateur Championship
- 2015 Western Junior
- 2018 Illinois Senior Amateur
- 2021 U.S. Senior Open Qualifier
