= Matt Atkins =

American professional golfer (born 1990)

Personal information
- Full name: Matthew David Atkins
- Nationality: United States
- Born: December 13, 1990 (age 35) Aston, Pennsylvania, U.S.
- Height: 5 ft 9 in (175 cm)
- Weight: 160 lb (73 kg)

Career
- Sport: Golf
- College: Henderson State University; University of South Carolina Aiken
- Turned professional: 2013
- Current tour: Korn Ferry Tour
- Former tour: PGA Tour
- Professional wins: 1

Number of wins by tour
- Korn Ferry Tour: 1

Matthew David Atkins (born December 13, 1990) is an American professional golfer.

Atkins was born in Aston, Pennsylvania. He played college golf at Henderson State University for one year before transferring to the University of South Carolina Aiken. He won three events for the Pacers. He turned professional after graduating in 2013.

Atkins played on mini-tours until he qualified for the 2015 Web.com Tour via Q-school. He played on the Web.com Tour from 2015 to 2017. He won the 2017 El Bosque Mexico Championship and finished 19th on the money list to earn a PGA Tour card for 2018.

On the PGA Tour in 2018, Atkins's best finish was a tie for 22nd at the Corales Puntacana Resort and Club Championship. After finishing 211th in the FedEx Cup standings, he dropped to the Web.com Tour for 2019.

== Amateur wins ==
- 2012 NCAA Division II South/SE Regional
- 2013 Palmetto Invitational, Peach Belt Conference Championship

== Professional wins (1) ==
=== Web.com Tour wins (1) ===
No.	Date	Tournament	Winning score	To par	Margin of victory	Runner-up
1	Apr 30, 2017	El Bosque Mexico Championship	68-69-66-68=271	−17	3 strokes	(Colombia) Sebastián Muñoz

== See also ==
- 2017 Web.com Tour Finals graduates
