= Kemper Lakes Golf Club =

Country club in Kildeer, Illinois

- Location within the United States Location within Illinois
- 42.209°N 88.038°W

Club information
- Location: Kildeer, Illinois, U.S.
- Elevation: 770 feet (235 m)
- Established: 1979; 47 years ago
- Type: Private (since 2007)
- Tota holes: 18
- Tournaments: PGA Championship (1989); Women's PGA Championship (2018); U.S. Women's Amateur (1992)
- Website: kemperlakesgolf.com
- Designed by: Ken Killian, Dick Nugent
- Par: 72
- Length: 7,345 yards (6,716 m)
- Course rating: 75.4
- Slope rating: 146

Kemper Lakes Golf Club is a private country club in the central United States, located in Ela Township, Lake County, outside Kildeer, Illinois, a suburb northwest of Chicago. It is also near the communities of Forest Lake, Lake Zurich, Hawthorn Woods, and Long Grove.

Kemper Lakes was founded 47 years ago in 1979 as an upscale public course by James S. Kemper, Jr., president and chairman of the board of Kemper Insurance Co., whose corporate offices were located on the south end of the spacious property. A big, sprawling 1970s-style layout, it was designed by Ken Killian and Dick Nugent and currently measures 7,345 yards (6,716 m) from the back tees. In its early years it was ranked by Golf Digest as one of the 100 Greatest Golf Courses in America.

== Notable events ==
The PGA Championship was played at Kemper Lakes in 1989 and was won by Payne Stewart. It also hosted the PGA of America's Grand Slam of Golf several years in the mid-1980s. Kemper Lakes hosted the U.S. Women's Amateur in 1992 where Vicki Goetze defeated Annika Sörenstam 1 up in the final. It was the site of the Women's PGA Championship from June 28 — July 1, 2018.

== Private club ==
In 2003, the course was sold to Crown Golf Properties, which began a four-year changeover from public to private golf.

== Course ==
Hole	Yards	Par	Hole	Yards	Par
1	406	4	10	453	4
2	400	4	11	534	5
3	173	3	12	393	4
4	508	5	13	251	3
5	442	4	14	425	4
6	180	3	15	621	5
7	557	5	16	485	4
8	421	4	17	203	3
9	460	4	18	433	4
Out	3,547	36	In	3,798	36
Source:			Total	7,345	72
