= Scott Gardiner =

Australian professional golfer (born 1976)

Personal information
- Nationality: Australia
- Born: 22 March 1976 (age 50) Liverpool, Australia
- Height: 5 ft 8 in (1.73 m)
- Weight: 165 lb (75 kg; 11.8 st)

Career
- Sport: Golf
- Turned professional: 2000
- Current tour: Web.com Tour
- Former tours: PGA Tour; PGA Tour of Australasia; European Tour
- Professional wins: 2

Number of wins by tour
- Korn Ferry Tour: 1
- Other: 1

Scott Gardiner (born 22 March 1976) is an Australian professional golfer.

== Career ==
Gardiner has played on the PGA Tour of Australasia and its developmental tour, the Von Nida Tour, where he won once. He played on the European Tour from 2001 to 2003. He played on the Nationwide Tour from 2003 to 2012, where he won the 2010 Chattanooga Classic. After the 2012 season, he graduated to the PGA Tour and made his Tour debut at the 2013 Sony Open in Hawaii. He made seven cuts in 23 events and finished 177th on both the money list and the FedEx Cup. He played the Web.com Tour Finals, finishing in eighth place to retain his PGA Tour card for 2014.

Gardiner is the first person of Aboriginal descent to earn a PGA Tour card.

== Amateur wins ==
- 1996 New South Wales Medal (tied with Nathan Green and Brendan Jones)

== Professional wins (2) ==
=== Nationwide Tour wins (1) ===
No.	Date	Tournament	Winning score	Margin of victory	Runners-up
1	10 Oct 2010	Chattanooga Classic	−19 (69-66-68-66=269)	Playoff	(United States) Joe Affrunti, (United States) David Branshaw

Web.com Tour playoff record (1–0)

No.	Year	Tournament	Opponents	Result
1	2010	Chattanooga Classic	(United States) Joe Affrunti, (United States) David Branshaw	Won with birdie on fourth extra hole Branshaw eliminated by birdie on first hole

=== Von Nida Tour wins (1) ===
No.	Date	Tournament	Winning score	Margin of victory	Runner-up
1	13 Nov 2005	Greater Building Society QLD PGA Championship	−23 (63-63-68-67=261)	Playoff	(Australia) Jason Day (a)

== Team appearances ==
Amateur

- Nomura Cup (representing Australia): 1999 (winners)
- Eisenhower Trophy (representing Australia): 2000
- Bonallack Trophy (representing Asia/Pacific): 2000
- Australian Men's Interstate Teams Matches (representing New South Wales): 1998 (winners), 1999

== See also ==
- 2012 Web.com Tour graduates
- 2013 Web.com Tour Finals graduates
