= Illinois PGA =

Illinois PGA Logo

Established in 1916, the Illinois PGA Section, headquartered in Glenview, Illinois, is a professional service organization serving the men and women golf professionals in northern and central Illinois who are the recognized experts in growing, teaching and managing the game of golf. The Illinois PGA Section is responsible for the administration of competitive golf tournaments, educational opportunities, support programs and growth of the game initiatives. The Illinois PGA Section is the 12th largest of the 41 regional entities or "Sections" that comprise the Professional Golfers' Association of America.

In 1922, Joe Roseman was appointed as the first president of the Illinois PGA. The current President of the Illinois PGA is Alex Mendez.

The largest annual event the Illinois PGA Section conducts is the Illinois Open Championship. For over 60 years, the Illinois Open has brought the finest amateur golfers together to compete against the finest professionals in the "state championship of golf".

The Illinois PGA Section conducts over 50 tournaments for its member professionals each year including four major championships:

- The Illinois PGA Match Play Championship
- The Illinois Open Championship (The "state championship of golf")
- The Illinois PGA Championship/PPNC (PGA Professional National Championship Qualifying)
- The Illinois PGA Players Championship
