= Dick Nugent =

American golf course developer and architect (1931–2018)

Dick Nugent (1931-2018) was a golf course developer and architect from Illinois. He graduated from the University of Illinois in 1958 with a degree in landscape architecture and started his professional career with Robert Bruce Harris, later becoming the principal architect of Killian and Nugent Inc. He is a member of the American Society of Golf Course Architects.

He formed Dick Nugent Associates in 1983 and has been responsible for the design or revision of over 90 golf courses in 12 states. Upon Nugent's retirement, he turned over the company to his son Tim, who has gone on to design a few other golf courses of his own.

He was a member of the USGA Green Section committee from 1982 until his death.
