= 2013 Web.com Tour =

Golf tour season

2013 Web.com Tour season
- Duration: February 21, 2013 – September 29, 2013
- Number of official events: 25
- Most wins: (United States) Chesson Hadley (2) (United States) Ben Martin (2) (United States) Michael Putnam (2) (United States) Andrew Svoboda (2)
- Regular season money list: (United States) Michael Putnam
- Finals money list: (United States) John Peterson
- Player of the Year: (United States) Michael Putnam

The 2013 Web.com Tour was the 24th season of the Web.com Tour, the official development tour to the PGA Tour.

== Changes for 2013 ==
This season saw the introduction of the Web.com Tour Finals, the final four events of the season which determined 25 of the 50 players to receive their 2013–14 PGA Tour cards. The remaining 25 PGA Tour cards went to the top 25 money winners on the Web.com Tour heading into the Tour Finals. For all 50 players who earn PGA Tour cards, their priority position for tournament entry purposes will be based on money earned during the Tour Finals.

== Schedule ==
The following table lists official events during the 2013 season.

Date	Tournament	Location	Purse (US$)	Winner (Note: The number in parentheses after each winner's name is the number of Web.com Tour events they had won up to and including that tournament. This information is only shown for Web.com Tour members. It is rare for someone to accumulate many wins on the Web.com Tour as success at this level usually leads to promotion to the PGA Tour.)	OWGR points	Notes
Feb 24	Panama Claro Championship	Panama	600,000	(United States) Kevin Foley (1)	14	
Mar 3	Colombia Championship	Colombia	700,000	(United States) Patrick Cantlay (1)	14	
Mar 10	Chile Classic	Chile	650,000	(United States) Kevin Kisner (2)	14	
Mar 24	Chitimacha Louisiana Open	Louisiana	550,000	(United States) Edward Loar (2)	14	
Apr 7	Brasil Classic	Brazil	675,000	(Chile) Benjamín Alvarado (1)	14	New tournament
Apr 14	WNB Golf Classic	Texas	600,000	(United States) Alex Aragon (2)	14	
Apr 28	South Georgia Classic	Georgia	650,000	(United States) Will Wilcox (1)	14	
May 5	Stadion Classic at UGA	Georgia	600,000	(United States) Brendon Todd (2)	14	
May 19	BMW Charity Pro-Am	South Carolina	650,000	(United States) Mark Anderson (1)	14	Pro-Am
May 26	Mexico Championship	Mexico	700,000	(United States) Michael Putnam (2)	14	New tournament
Jun 2	Mid-Atlantic Championship	Maryland	600,000	(United States) Michael Putnam (3)	14	
Jun 16	Air Capital Classic	Kansas	650,000	(United States) Scott Parel (1)	14	
Jun 23	Rex Hospital Open	North Carolina	625,000	(United States) Chesson Hadley (1)	14	
Jun 30	United Leasing Championship	Indiana	600,000	(United States) Ben Martin (1)	14	
Jul 14	Utah Championship	Utah	625,000	(New Zealand) Steven Alker (3)	14	
Jul 21	Midwest Classic	Kansas	600,000	(United States) Jamie Lovemark (2)	14	
Jul 28	Albertsons Boise Open	Idaho	775,000	(United States) Kevin Tway (1)	14	
Aug 4	Mylan Classic	Pennsylvania	675,000	(United States) Ben Martin (2)	14	
Aug 11	Price Cutter Charity Championship	Missouri	675,000	(United States) Andrew Svoboda (1)	14	
Aug 18	News Sentinel Open	Tennessee	550,000	(United States) Peter Malnati (1)	14	
Aug 25	Cox Classic	Nebraska	800,000	(Australia) Bronson La'Cassie (1)	14	
Sep 1	Hotel Fitness Championship	Indiana	1,000,000	(South Africa) Trevor Immelman (1)	16	New tournament Finals event
Sep 8	Chiquita Classic	North Carolina	1,000,000	(United States) Andrew Svoboda (2)	16	Finals event
Sep 15	Nationwide Children's Hospital Championship	Ohio	1,000,000	(South Korea) Noh Seung-yul (1)	16	Finals event
Sep 29	Web.com Tour Championship	Florida	1,000,000	(United States) Chesson Hadley (2)	20	Finals event

== Location of tournaments ==
Location of tournaments of the 2013 Web.com Tour in the United States.
Regular-season events
Regular-season finale
Finals events
Location of tournaments of the 2013 Web.com Tour outside the United States.

== Money list ==
=== Regular season money list ===
The regular season money list was based on prize money won during the season, calculated in U.S. dollars. The top 25 players on the regular season money list earned status to play on the 2013–14 PGA Tour.

Position	Player	Prize money ($)
1	(United States) Michael Putnam	450,184
2	(United States) Ben Martin	399,769
3	(United States) Chesson Hadley	305,999
4	(United States) Edward Loar	303,993
5	(United States) Kevin Tway	260,541

=== Finals money list ===
The Finals money list was based on prize money won during the Web.com Tour Finals, calculated in U.S. dollars. The top 25 players on the Finals money list (not otherwise exempt) earned status to play on the 2013–14 PGA Tour.

Position	Player	Prize money ($)
1	(United States) John Peterson	230,000
2	(United States) Chesson Hadley	229,433
3	(South Korea) Noh Seung-yul	210,125
4	(United States) Andrew Svoboda	192,067
5	(South Africa) Trevor Immelman	180,000

== Awards ==
Award	Winner	Ref.
Player of the Year (Jack Nicklaus Trophy)	(United States) Michael Putnam	
