= 2020–21 PGA Tour priority ranking =

The PGA Tour priority rankings determine the order in which players qualify for open PGA Tour events (i.e. everything except the Majors, Players, WGCs, and Invitational events).

== PGA Tour card ==
Any player ranked within the top 31 qualification criteria, excluding tournament specific criteria (category 12–17, 25), are described as having a "PGA Tour card". PGA Tour card holders gain their status via tournament wins, finishing in the top 125 in the previous season's Fed Ex Cup, or through promotion from the previous season's Korn Ferry Tour. Members in the higher categories can usually guarantee qualification for any PGA Tour tournament, in the lower categories entry can be less certain and the priority order within the category is reshuffled during the season.

Players without a PGA Tour card, but with a status within the PGA priority rankings will often have to rely on sponsor's exemptions to qualify for a tournament.

The 2020–21 PGA Tour eligibility was altered as a result of the COVID-19 pandemic as such:

- No players will graduate from the Korn Ferry Tour.
- The Korn Ferry Tour category (27), will consist of players in the 2019-20 Top 125 category (20) and the KFT category who finished outside the Top 125 FedEx Cup places in 2019-20.
- The Top 125 category (20) will be based upon the 2019-2020 FedExCup Points List. Players in category 1-11 in the 2019-20 season will remain in the same category for 2020-21.
- The 126-150 category will consist of players who finished in the 126-150 placings in either the 2018-19 or 2019-20, and have not qualified for any higher category.

== Priority rankings ==
2019–20 FedEx Cup rank key
| – | Player on the 2019–20 priority rankings who scored no FedEx Cup points |
| ST | Player who had special temporary membership in 2019–20 |

Qualifying criteria key
| † | Qualified multiple times for the category (only most recent qualifying item shown) |
| ‡ | Began the season within another category |

2021-22 status key
| = | Qualified for a 2021–22 PGA Tour card within the same category |
| ↑ | Qualified for a 2021–22 PGA Tour card in a higher category |
| ↓ | Qualified for a 2021–22 PGA Tour card in a lower category |
| = | Below category 31 in the 2021–22 Priority rankings but within the same category as 2020–21 |
| ↓ | Below category 31 in the 2020–21 Priority rankings and in a lower category than 2020–21 |
| ↓ | No status in the 2021–22 PGA Tour |

Correct as at the conclusion of the 2021 BMW Championship

Most recent reorder of categories 26 and 34 occurred after the Charles Schwab Challenge (May 30)

| Player | Qualifying criteria | FedEx Cup rank | FedEx Cup rank | 2021-2022 status | Ref |
| Player | Qualifying criteria | 2019–2020 | 2020-2021 | 2021-2022 status | Ref |
(1a) Winner of PGA Championship or U.S. Open prior to 1970 (alphabetical order)
| (United States) Dow Finsterwald | Winner of the 1958 PGA Championship (1) | − | − | = | |
| (United States) Raymond Floyd | Winner of the 1969 PGA Championship (1) | − | − | = | |
| (United States) Al Geiberger | Winner of the 1966 PGA Championship (1) | − | − | = | |
| (United States) Don January | Winner of the 1967 PGA Championship (1) | − | − | = | |
| (United States) Bobby Nichols | Winner of the 1964 PGA Championship (1) | − | − | = | |
| (United States) Jack Nicklaus | Winner of the 1967 U.S. Open† (1) | − | − | = | |
| (South Africa) Gary Player | Winner of the 1965 U.S. Open† (1) | − | − | = | |
| (United States) Lee Trevino | Winner of the 1968 U.S. Open (1) | − | − | = | |
(1b) Winner of PGA Championship or U.S. Open in the last five seasons and the current season (alphabetical order)
| (Australia) Jason Day | Winner of the 2015 PGA Championship (1) | 57 | 114 | ↓ | |
| (United States) Bryson DeChambeau | Winner of the 2020 U.S. Open (1) (‡6a) | 22 | 7 | = | |
| (United States) Dustin Johnson | Winner of the 2016 U.S. Open (1) | 1 | 8 | = | |
| (United States) Brooks Koepka | Winner of the 2019 PGA Championship† (1) | 104 | 30 | = | |
| (United States) Phil Mickelson | Winner of the 2021 PGA Championship (1) (‡6) | 75 | 70 | = | |
| (United States) Collin Morikawa | Winner of the 2020 PGA Championship (1) | 6 | 26 | = | |
| (Spain) Jon Rahm | Winner of the 2021 U.S. Open (1) (‡6a) | 4 | 2 | = | |
| (United States) Jordan Spieth | Winner of the 2015 U.S. Open (1) | 107 | 20 | ↓ | |
| (United States) Justin Thomas | Winner of the 2017 PGA Championship (1) | 2 | 4 | = | |
| (United States) Jimmy Walker | Winner of the 2016 PGA Championship (1) | 179 | 166 | = | |
| (United States) Gary Woodland | Winner of the 2019 U.S. Open (1) | 43 | 113 | = | |
(2) Winner of The Players Championship in the last five seasons and the current season (alphabetical order)
| (United States) Rickie Fowler | Winner of the 2015 Players Championship (2) | 94 | 134 | ↓ | |
| (South Korea) Si Woo Kim | Winner of the 2017 Players Championship (2) | 81 | 34 | = | |
| (Northern Ireland) Rory McIlroy | Winner of the 2019 Players Championship (2) | 8 | 14 | = | |
| (United States) Webb Simpson | Winner of the 2018 Players Championship (2) | 12 | 40 | = | |
(3) Winner of the Masters Tournament in the last five seasons and the current season (alphabetical order)
| (Spain) Sergio García | Winner of the 2017 Masters Tournament (3) | 135 | 14 | = | |
| (Japan) Hideki Matsuyama | Winner of the 2021 Masters Tournament (3) (‡6) | 15 | 26 | = | |
| (United States) Patrick Reed | Winner of the 2018 Masters Tournament (3) | 8 | 25 | = | |
| (England) Danny Willett | Winner of the 2016 Masters Tournament (3) | 146 | 152 | = | |
| (United States) Tiger Woods | Winner of the 2019 Masters Tournament (3) | 63 | 223 | = | |
(4) Winner of The Open Championship in the last five seasons and the current season (alphabetical order)
| (United States) Zach Johnson | Winner of the 2015 Open Championship (4) | 105 | 109 | ↓ | |
| (Republic of Ireland) Shane Lowry | Winner of the 2019 Open Championship (4) | 123 | 45 | = | |
| (Italy) Francesco Molinari | Winner of the 2018 Open Championship (4) | 193 | 142 | = | |
| (Sweden) Henrik Stenson | Winner of the 2016 Open Championship (4) | 201 | 187 | = | |
(5) Winner of The Tour Championship in 2017 and 2018 (alphabetical order)
| (United States) Xander Schauffele | Winner of 2017 Tour Championship (5) | 2 | 5 | ↓ | |
(6) Winner of World Golf Championships events in the last three seasons and the current season (alphabetical order)
| (Mexico) Abraham Ancer | Winner of 2021 WGC-FedEx St. Jude Invitational (6) (‡20) | 18 | 9 | = | |
| (United States) Billy Horschel | Winner of 2021 WGC-Dell Technologies Match Play (6) (‡9) | 30 | 9 | = | |
| (United States) Kevin Kisner | Winning of the 2019 WGC-Dell Technologies Match Play (6) | 23 | 38 | = | |
| (England) Justin Rose | Winner of the 2017 WGC-HSBC Champions (6) | 91 | 126 | = | |
| (United States) Bubba Watson | Winner of the 2018 WGC-Dell Technologies Match Play (6) | 46 | 81 | = | |
(6a) Winner of the Arnold Palmer Invitational, the Memorial Tournament, or the Genesis Invitational in the last three seasons (alphabetical order)
| (United States) Patrick Cantlay | Winner of the 2021 Memorial Tournament (6a) | 34 | 1 | = | |
| (United States) Jason Dufner | Winner of the 2017 Memorial Tournament (6a) | 164 | 154 | ↓ | |
| (England) Tyrrell Hatton | Winner of the 2020 Arnold Palmer Invitational (6a) | 7 | 74 | = | |
| (United States) Max Homa | Winner of the 2021 Genesis Invitational (6a) (‡9) | 70 | 35 | = | |
| (Australia) Marc Leishman | Winner of the 2017 Arnold Palmer Invitational (6a) | 29 | 42 | ↓ | |
| (Australia) Adam Scott | Winner of the 2020 Genesis Invitational (6a) | 41 | 90 | = | |
(7) Winner of the FedEx Cup in the last five seasons (alphabetical order)
(8) Leader in PGA Tour official money list in 2015 and 2016 (alphabetical order)
(9) Winners of PGA Tour co-sponsored or approved tournaments, whose victories are considered official, within the last two seasons, or during the current season; winners receive an additional season of exemption for each additional win, up to five seasons (alphabetical order)
| (United States) Ryan Armour | Winner of the 2017 Sanderson Farms Championship (9) | 101 | 127 | ↓ | |
| (United States) Daniel Berger | Winner of the 2021 AT&T Pebble Beach Pro-Am† (9) | 15 | 11 | = | |
| (United States) Keegan Bradley | Winner of the 2018 BMW Championship (9) | 99 | 39 | ↓ | |
| (United States) Sam Burns | Winner of 2021 Valero Texas Open (9) (‡20) | 111 | 18 | = | |
| (England) Paul Casey | Winner of the 2019 Valspar Championship† (9) | 49 | 52 | = | |
| (United States) Cameron Champ | Winner of the 2021 3M Open† (9) | 24 | 57 | = | |
| (United States) Stewart Cink | Winner of the 2021 RBC Heritage (9) (‡32a) | 144 | 26 | = | |
| (Canada) Corey Conners | Winner of the 2019 Valero Texas Open (9) | 53 | 22 | = | |
| (United States) Austin Cook | Winner of the 2017 RSM Classic (9) | 155 | 136 | ↓ | |
| (United States) Joel Dahmen | Winner of 2021 Corales Puntacana Resort and Club Championship (9) (‡20) | 38 | 76 | = | |
| (Australia) Cameron Davis | Winner of 2021 Rocket Mortgage Classic (9) (‡20) | 84 | 37 | = | |
| (United States) Tyler Duncan | Winner of the 2019 RSM Classic (9) | 40 | 162 | = | |
| (United States) Harris English | Winner of the 2021 Travelers Championship (9) (‡20) | 12 | 18 | = | |
| (United States) Tony Finau | Winner of the 2021 The Northern Trust (9) (‡20) | 17 | 11 | = | |
| (South Africa) Dylan Frittelli | Winner of the 2019 John Deere Classic (9) | 58 | 119 | = | |
| (United States) Brice Garnett | Winner of the 2018 Corales Puntacana Resort and Club Championship (9) | 121 | 123 | ↓ | |
| (United States) Brian Gay | Winner of the 2020 Bermuda Championship (9) (‡20) | 115 | 95 | = | |
| (United States) Lucas Glover | Winner of the 2021 John Deere Classic (9) (‡20) | 118 | 46 | = | |
| (South Africa) Branden Grace | Winner of 2021 Puerto Rico Open (9) (‡27) (‡31) | 165 | 55 | = | |
| (United States) Lanto Griffin | Winner of the 2019 Houston Open (9) | 18 | 89 | = | |
| (United States) Jim Herman | Winner of the 2020 Wyndham Championship† (9) | 64 | 171 | = | |
| (South Africa) Garrick Higgo | Winner of the 2021 Palmetto Championship (9) | - | 107 | = | |
| (United States) J. B. Holmes | Winner of the 2019 Genesis Open (9) | 148 | 210 | = | |
| (Norway) Viktor Hovland | Winner of the 2020 Mayakoba Golf Classic† (9) | 20 | 5 | = | |
| (United States) Charles Howell III | Winner of the 2018 RSM Classic (9) | 69 | 139 | = | |
| (South Korea) Im Sung-jae | Winner of the 2020 Honda Classic (9) | 11 | 20 | = | |
| (Australia) Matt Jones | Winner of the 2021 Honda Classic (9) (‡20) | 95 | 47 | = | |
| (South Korea) Kang Sung-hoon | Winner of the 2019 AT&T Byron Nelson (9) | 72 | 178 | = | |
| (United States) Michael Kim | Winner of the 2018 John Deere Classic (9) | 248 | 214 | ↓ | |
| (United States) Patton Kizzire | Winner of the 2018 Sony Open in Hawaii† (9) | 172 | 63 | = | |
| (Scotland) Russell Knox | Winner of the 2015 WGC-HSBC Champions and 2016 Travelers Championship (3+1yr exemption) (9) | 127 | 110 | ↓ | |
| (Japan) Satoshi Kodaira | Winner of the 2018 RBC Heritage (9) | 220 | 150 | ↓ | |
| (United States) Jason Kokrak | Winner of the 2021 Colonial National Invitation (9) (‡20) | 42 | 11 | = | |
| (United States) Matt Kuchar | Winner of the 2019 Sony Open in Hawaii† (9) | 62 | 122 | = | |
| (United States) Andrew Landry | Winner of the 2020 The American Express (9) | 61 | 155 | = | |
| (Scotland) Martin Laird | Winner of the 2020 Shriners Hospitals for Children Open (9) (‡27) | 182 | 75 | = | |
| (United States) Nate Lashley | Winner of the 2019 Rocket Mortgage Classic (9) | 96 | 131 | = | |
| (South Korea) Lee Kyoung-hoon | Winner of the 2021 AT&T Byron Nelson (9) (‡20) | 97 | 31 | = | |
| (United States) Adam Long | Winner of the 2019 Desert Classic (9) | 31 | 85 | = | |
| (Northern Ireland) Graeme McDowell | Winner of the 2019 Corales Puntacana Resort and Club Championship (9) | 117 | 195 | = | |
| (United States) Troy Merritt | Winner of the 2018 Barbasol Championship (9) | 74 | 78 | ↓ | |
| (United States) Keith Mitchell | Winner of the 2019 Honda Classic (9) | 112 | 65 | = | |
| (Colombia) Sebastián Muñoz | Winner of the 2019 Sanderson Farms Championship (9) | 8 | 53 | = | |
| (United States) Kevin Na | Winner of the 2021 Sony Open in Hawaii† (9) | 27 | 3 | = | |
| (Chile) Joaquín Niemann | Winner of the 2019 Military Tribute at The Greenbrier (9) | 27 | 29 | = | |
| (Mexico) Carlos Ortiz | Winner of the 2020 Houston Open (9) (‡20) | 51 | 48 | = | |
| (United States) Ryan Palmer | Joint winner of the 2019 Zurich Classic of New Orleans (9) | 24 | 69 | = | |
| (Taiwan) Pan Cheng-tsung | Winner of the 2019 RBC Heritage (9) | 178 | 121 | = | |
| (United States) Pat Perez | Winner of the 2017 CIMB Classic (9) | 90 | 80 | ↓ | |
| (United States) Scott Piercy | Joint winner of the 2018 Zurich Classic of New Orleans (9) | 102 | 116 | ↓ | |
| (United States) J. T. Poston | Winner of the 2019 Wyndham Championship | 67 | 79 | = | |
| (United States) Ted Potter Jr. | Winner of the 2018 AT&T Pebble Beach Pro-Am (9) | 154 | 182 | ↓ | |
| (England) Ian Poulter | Winner of the 2018 Houston Open (9) | 88 | 77 | ↓ | |
| (Republic of Ireland) Séamus Power | Winner of the 2021 Barbasol Championship (9) (‡32a) | 151 | 72 | = | |
| (United States) Andrew Putnam | Winner of the 2018 Barracuda Championship (9) | 147 | 82 | ↓ | |
| (United States) Chez Reavie | Winner of the 2019 Travelers Championship (9) | 89 | 104 | = | |
| (Australia) Cameron Smith | Winner of the 2021 Zurich Classic of New Orleans (9) | 24 | 14 | = | |
| (United States) Brandt Snedeker | Winner of the 2018 Wyndham Championship (9) | 106 | 97 | ↓ | |
| (United States) Brendan Steele | Winner of the 2017 Safeway Open (9) | 47 | 105 | ↓ | |
| (United States) Robert Streb | Winner of the 2020 RSM Classic (9) (‡27) | 145 | 60 | = | |
| (United States) Hudson Swafford | Winner of the 2020 Corales Puntacana Resort and Club Championship (9) (‡22) | 167 | 36 | = | |
| (Canada) Nick Taylor | Winner of the 2020 AT&T Pebble Beach Pro-Am (9) | 48 | 141 | = | |
| (United States) Michael Thompson | Winner of the 2020 3M Open (9) | 59 | 132 | = | |
| (United States) Brendon Todd | Winner of the 2019 Mayakoba Golf Classic† (9) | 20 | 101 | = | |
| (United States) Martin Trainer | Winner of the 2019 Puerto Rico Open (9) | 216 | 221 | = | |
| (United States) Kevin Tway | Winner of the 2018 Safeway Open (9) | 180 | 176 | = | |
| (South Africa) Erik van Rooyen | Winner of 2021 Barracuda Championship (9) (‡21) | − | 22 | = | |
| (United States) Richy Werenski | Winner of 2020 Barracuda Championship (9) | 39 | 120 | = | |
| (United States) Aaron Wise | Winner of the 2018 AT&T Byron Nelson (9) | 150 | 49 | ↓ | |
| (United States) Matthew Wolff | Winner of the 2019 3M Open (9) | 35 | 71 | = | |
(11a) Career Money Exemption - One time exemption for Top 50 (alphabetical order)
| (South Korea) K. J. Choi | 27th in Career Money (11a) | 207 | 213 | ↓ | |
| (South Africa) Tim Clark | 60th in Career Money (Top 50 rating deferred from a previous season due to injury) (11a) | − | − | ↓ | |
| (United States) Jerry Kelly | 43rd in Career Money (11a) | 212 | 249 | ↓ | |
| (United States) Hunter Mahan | 37th in Career Money (11a) | − | 225 | ↓ | |
| (United States) Steve Stricker | 16th in Career Money (already used Top 25 exemption) (11a) | 199 | 157 | ↓ | |
| (United States) Bo Van Pelt | 76th in Career Money (Top 50 rating deferred from a previous season due to injury) (11a) | 228 | 147 | ↓ | |
(11b) Career Money Exemption - One time exemption for Top 25 (alphabetical order)
| (England) Luke Donald | 24th in Career Money (11b) | 191 | 184 | = | |
| (United States) Jim Furyk | 3rd in Career Money (11b) | 181 | 201 | = | |
| (United States) David Toms | 17th in Career Money (11b) | − | − | = | |
(12) Sponsor exemptions (a maximum of eight, which may include amateurs with handicaps of 0 or less)
(13) Two international players designated by the Commissioner.
(14) The current PGA Club Professional Champion (up to 6 open events).
| (United States) Alex Beach | 2019 PGA Club Professional Champion (14) | − | − | ↓ | |
(15) PGA Section Champion or Player of the Year of the Section in which the tournament is played.
(16) Four low scorers at Open Qualifying which shall normally be held on Monday of tournament week.
(17) Past champions of the particular event being contested that week, if cosponsored by the PGA TOUR and the same tournament sponsor
(18) Life Members (15-year PGA Tour members with 20+ wins) (alphabetical order)
| (United States) Davis Love III | Joined in 1986 and has 21 PGA Tour wins (18) | 231 | − | = | |
| (Fiji) Vijay Singh | Joined in 1993 and has 34 PGA Tour wins (18) | 244 | − | = | |
(20) Top 125 on the previous season's FedEx Cup points list (alphabetical order)
| (United States) Scottie Scheffler | Ranked 5 in 2020 FedEx Cup points list (20) | 5 | 22 | = | |
| (Canada) Mackenzie Hughes | Ranked 14 in 2020 FedEx Cup points list (20) | 14 | 67 | = | |
| (United States) Kevin Streelman | Ranked 32 in 2020 FedEx Cup points list (20) | 32 | 64 | = | |
| (South Korea) An Byeong-hun | Ranked 33 in 2020 FedEx Cup points list (20) | 33 | 164 | ↓ | |
| (England) Matt Fitzpatrick | Ranked 36 in 2020 FedEx Cup points list (20) | 36 | 73 | = | |
| (United States) Brian Harman | Ranked 37 in 2020 FedEx Cup points list (20) | 37 | 41 | = | |
| (United States) Mark Hubbard | Ranked 44 in 2020 FedEx Cup points list (20) | 44 | 143 | ↓ | |
| (New Zealand) Danny Lee | Ranked 45 in 2020 FedEx Cup points list (20) | 45 | 183 | ↓ | |
| (United States) Tom Hoge | Ranked 50 in 2020 FedEx Cup points list (20) | 50 | 54 | = | |
| (Sweden) Alex Norén | Ranked 52 in 2020 FedEx Cup points list (20) | 52 | 33 | = | |
| (Canada) Adam Hadwin | Ranked 54 in 2020 FedEx Cup points list (20) | 54 | 103 | = | |
| (United States) Harry Higgs | Ranked 55 in 2020 FedEx Cup points list (20) | 55 | 66 | = | |
| (United States) Russell Henley | Ranked 56 in 2020 FedEx Cup points list (20) | 56 | 56 | = | |
| (United States) Talor Gooch | Ranked 60 in 2020 FedEx Cup points list (20) | 60 | 68 | = | |
| (South Africa) Louis Oosthuizen | Ranked 65 in 2020 FedEx Cup points list (20) | 65 | 14 | = | |
| (United States) Robby Shelton | Ranked 66 in 2020 FedEx Cup points list (20) | 66 | 167 | ↓ | |
| (United States) Maverick McNealy | Ranked 68 in 2020 FedEx Cup points list (20) | 68 | 58 | = | |
| (United States) Doc Redman | Ranked 71 in 2020 FedEx Cup Points list (20) | 71 | 94 | = | |
| (United States) Denny McCarthy | Ranked 73 in 2020 FedEx Cup points list (20) | 73 | 100 | = | |
| (Sweden) Henrik Norlander | Ranked 76 in 2020 FedEx Cup points list (20) | 76 | 93 | = | |
| (United States) Charley Hoffman | Ranked 77 in 2020 FedEx Cup points list (20) | 77 | 32 | = | |
| (China) Zhang Xinjun | Ranked 78 in 2020 FedEx Cup points list (20) | 78 | 173 | ↓ | |
| (Austria) Sepp Straka | Ranked 79 in 2020 FedEx Cup points list (20) | 79 | 106 | = | |
| (United States) Harold Varner III | Ranked 80 in 2020 FedEx Cup points list (20) | 80 | 44 | = | |
| (United States) Cameron Tringale | Ranked 82 in 2020 FedEx Cup points list (20) | 82 | 43 | = | |
| (United States) Bud Cauley | Ranked 83 in 2020 FedEx Cup points list (20) | 83 | 212 | ↓ | |
| (United States) Vaughn Taylor | Ranked 85 in 2020 FedEx Cup points list (20) | 85 | 149 | ↓ | |
| (United States) Patrick Rodgers | Ranked 86 in 2020 FedEx Cup points list (20) | 86 | 128 | ↓ | |
| (United States) Brian Stuard | Ranked 87 in 2020 FedEx Cup points list (20) | 87 | 92 | = | |
| (England) Tommy Fleetwood | Ranked 92 in 2020 FedEx Cup points list (20) | 92 | 137 | ↓ | |
| (Argentina) Emiliano Grillo | Ranked 93 in 2020 FedEx Cup points list (20) | 93 | 59 | = | |
| (United States) Scott Harrington | Ranked 98 in 2020 FedEx Cup points list (20) | 98 | 172 | ↓ | |
| (United States) Matthew NeSmith | Ranked 100 in 2020 FedEx Cup points list (20) | 100 | 115 | = | |
| (United States) Ryan Moore | Ranked 103 in 2020 FedEx Cup points list (20) | 103 | 144 | ↓ | |
| (United States) Sam Ryder | Ranked 108 in 2020 FedEx Cup points list (20) | 108 | 112 | = | |
| (United States) Adam Schenk | Ranked 109 in 2020 FedEx Cup points list (20) | 109 | 88 | = | |
| (United States) Wyndham Clark | Ranked 110 in 2020 FedEx Cup points list (20) | 110 | 87 | = | |
| (United States) Zac Blair | Ranked 113 in 2020 FedEx Cup points list (20) | 113 | 247 | ↓ | |
| (United States) Scott Brown | Ranked 114 in 2020 FedEx Cup points list (20) | 114 | 160 | ↓ | |
| (United States) Beau Hossler | Ranked 116 in 2020 FedEx Cup points list (20) | 116 | 148 | ↓ | |
| (United States) Luke List | Ranked 119 in 2020 FedEx Cup points list (20) | 119 | 102 | = | |
| (United States) Scott Stallings | Ranked 120 in 2020 FedEx Cup points list (20) | 120 | 124 | = | |
| (Slovakia) Rory Sabbatini | Ranked 122 in 2020 FedEx Cup points list (20) | 122 | 133 | ↓ | |
| (England) Tom Lewis | Ranked 124 in 2020 FedEx Cup points list (20) | 124 | 156 | ↓ | |
| (United States) Bo Hoag | Ranked 125 in 2020 FedEx Cup points list (20) | 125 | 129 | ↓ | |
(21) Players who finished greater than or equal to top 125 on the 2019-20 PGA Tour Official Season FedExCup Points through the Wyndham Championship as non-members (alphabetical order)
| (United States) Will Gordon | Finished the non-member points list last season with 334, equivalent to 105th on the FedEx points list (21) | − | 159 | ↓ | |
(22) Major Medical Extension (alphabetical order)
| (United States) Briny Baird | Requires 72 FedExCup points from 9 events (22) | − | − | = | |
| (Sweden) Jonas Blixt | Requires 253 FedExCup points from 16 events (22) | − | 222 | = | |
| (United States) Wesley Bryan | Requires 125 FedExCup points from 6 events (22) | 190 | 181 | = | |
| (United States) Kevin Chappell | Requires 129 FedExCup points from 8 events (22) | 198 | 188 | = | |
| (Canada) Graham DeLaet | Requires 266 FedExCup points from 19 events (22) | 237 | − | = | |
| (United States) James Hahn | Fulfilled terms of Major Medical Extension with T32 at 2021 Desert Classic (22) | 171 | 108 | ↑ | |
| (United States) Morgan Hoffmann | Requires 238 FedExCup points from 3 events (22) | 222 | − | = | |
| (United States) Kelly Kraft | Requires 196 FedExCup points from 6 events (22) | − | 207 | = | |
| (United States) Chris Kirk | Fulfilled terms of Major Medical Extension with T2 at 2021 Sony Open in Hawaii (22) | 194 | 62 | ↑ | |
| (United States) William McGirt | Requires 362 FedExCup points from 17 events (22) | 247 | 235 | = | |
| (South Korea) Noh Seung-yul | Requires 292 FedExCup points from 16 events (22) | 205 | 243 | = | |
| (South Africa) Charl Schwartzel | Fulfilled terms of Major Medical Extension (22) | 128 | 51 | ↑ | |
| (United States) Kevin Stadler | Requires 439 FedExCup points from 1 events (22) | − | 239 | = | |
(23) Leading points winner from the 2019 Korn Ferry Tour (combining Regular Season and Finals Points List). Winner of the 2019 Korn Ferry Finals. 3-time winners from 2019 Korn Ferry Tour. (alphabetical order)
(24) Leading money winner from Korn Ferry Tour medical. (alphabetical order)
(25) Top 10 and ties, not otherwise exempt, among professionals from the previous open tournament whose victory has official status are exempt into the next open tournament whose victory has official status.
| (26) Reorder Categories 27-29 (Note: Reordered after the conclusion of The Mayakoba Golf Classic and The Genesis Invitational; Valero Texas Open; Charles Schwab Challenge thereafter, Monday of John Deere Classic.) | (27) The 2018-19 Top 125 FedExCup Points List / 2019 Top Finishers Korn Ferry Tour Category | | | | |
| (26) Reorder Categories 27-29 | (28) 300 PGA Tour career cuts made as of the end of the preceding season - One time exemption (alphabetical order). | | | | |
| (26) Reorder Categories 27-29 | (29) Top Finishers from the Web.com Tour medical (alphabetical order). | | | | |
| (United States) Peter Malnati | Ranked 118 in 2019 FedEx Cup points list (27) | 137 | 86 | ↑ | |
| (United States) Doug Ghim | Ranked 27 in 2019 Korn Ferry Tour Finals (27) | 184 | 83 | ↑ | |
| (United States) Tyler McCumber | Ranked 22 in 2019 Korn Ferry Tour regular season (27) | 161 | 99 | ↑ | |
| (England) Matt Wallace | Finished the non-member points list last season with 461, equivalent to 98th on the FedEx list (27) | 134 | 111 | ↑ | |
| (United States) Brandon Hagy | Ranked 4 in 2019 Korn Ferry Tour Finals (27) | 152 | 84 | ↑ | |
| (United States) Kyle Stanley | Ranked 103 in 2019 FedEx Cup points list (27) | 133 | 117 | ↑ | |
| (Venezuela) Jhonattan Vegas | Ranked 76 in 2019 FedEx Cup points list (27) | 139 | 61 | ↑ | |
| (United States) Chase Seiffert | Ranked 15 in 2019 Korn Ferry Tour regular season (27) | 131 | 138 | ↓ | |
| (India) Anirban Lahiri | Ranked 11 in 2019 Korn Ferry Tour Finals (27) | 219 | 118 | ↑ | |
| (United States) Vince Whaley | Fell 108 FedExCup points shy from earning a promotion (27) (‡31) | 183 | 140 | ↓ | |
| (Australia) Cameron Percy | Ranked 21 in 2019 Korn Ferry Tour Finals (27) | 143 | 135 | ↓ | |
| (Canada) Michael Gligic | Ranked 17 in 2019 Korn Ferry Tour regular season (27) | 168 | 145 | ↓ | |
| (United States) Kramer Hickok | Ranked 5 in 2019 Korn Ferry Tour Finals (27) | 170 | 91 | ↑ | |
| (Puerto Rico) Rafael Campos | Fell 210 FedExCup points shy from earning a promotion (27) (‡29) | 208 | 151 | ↓ | |
| (United States) Hank Lebioda | Ranked 23 in 2019 Korn Ferry Tour Finals (27) | 140 | 98 | ↑ | |
| (United States) Bronson Burgoon | Fulfilled Terms of Medical Extension but failed to finish within top 125 (27) | 130 | 158 | ↓ | |
| (United States) Joseph Bramlett | Ranked 26 in 2019 Korn Ferry Tour Finals (27) | 141 | 146 | ↓ | |
| (Canada) Roger Sloan | Ranked 93 in 2019 FedEx Cup points list (27) | 169 | 96 | ↑ | |
| (Norway) Kristoffer Ventura | Ranked 4 in 2019 Korn Ferry Tour regular season (27) | 156 | 165 | ↓ | |
| (United States) Chesson Hadley | Ranked 80 in 2019 FedEx Cup points list (27) | 136 | 125 | ↑ | |
| (Canada) David Hearn | Ranked 16 in 2019 Korn Ferry Tour Finals (27) | 160 | 163 | ↓ | |
| (United States) Rob Oppenheim | Ranked 24 in 2019 Korn Ferry Tour Finals (27) | 138 | 161 | ↓ | |
| (United States) J. J. Spaun | Ranked 99 in 2019 FedEx Cup points list (27) | 185 | 174 | ↓ | |
| (Spain) Rafa Cabrera-Bello | Ranked 70 in 2019 FedEx Cup points list (27) | 129 | 170 | ↓ | |
| (United States) Grayson Murray | Fell 299 points shy of fulfilling Major Medical Extension (27) (‡22) | 186 | 191 | ↓ | |
| (United States) D. J. Trahan | Ranked T28 in 2019 Korn Ferry Tour Finals (27) | 153 | 190 | ↓ | |
| (United States) Ryan Brehm | Ranked 13 in 2019 Korn Ferry Tour regular season (27) | 197 | 185 | ↓ | |
| (Denmark) Sebastian Cappelen | Ranked 16 in 2019 Korn Ferry Tour regular season (27) | 157 | 198 | ↓ | |
| (New Zealand) Tim Wilkinson | Fell 77 FedExCup points shy of earning a promotion (27) (‡31) | 149 | 205 | ↓ | |
| (Argentina) Nelson Ledesma | Ranked 8 in 2019 Korn Ferry Tour regular season (27) | 217 | 192 | ↓ | |
| (Thailand) Kiradech Aphibarnrat | Ranked 83 in 2019 FedEx Cup points list (27) | 188 | 196 | ↓ | |
| (Argentina) Fabián Gómez | Ranked 6 in 2019 Korn Ferry Tour Finals (27) | 126 | 189 | ↓ | |
| (United States) Mark Anderson | Ranked 14 in 2019 Korn Ferry Tour regular season (27) | 158 | 179 | ↓ | |
| (Australia) Rhein Gibson | Ranked 10 in 2019 Korn Ferry Tour regular season (27) | 192 | 193 | ↓ | |
| (United States) Nick Watney | Fell 14 FedExCup points shy from earning a promotion (27) (‡31) | 132 | 204 | ↓ | |
| (England) Ben Taylor | Ranked 10 in 2019 Korn Ferry Tour Finals (27) | 210 | 186 | ↓ | |
| (Australia) Aaron Baddeley | Ranked 116 in 2019 FedEx Cup points list (27) | 159 | 202 | ↓ | |
| (United States) Chris Baker | Ranked 18 in 2019 Korn Ferry Tour Finals (27) | 163 | 200 | ↓ | |
| (Australia) John Senden | 300 PGA Tour career cuts made using one-time exemption (28) | 233 | 220 | ↓ | |
| (Canada) Michael Gellerman | Ranked 21 in 2019 Korn Ferry Tour regular season (27) | 206 | 203 | ↓ | |
| (United States) Chris Stroud | Ranked 102 in 2019 FedEx Cup points list (27) | 174 | − | ↓ | |
| (United States) Matt Every | Ranked 86 in 2019 FedEx Cup points list (27) | 189 | − | ↓ | |
| (Denmark) Lucas Bjerregaard | Finished the non-member points list last season with 394, equivalent to 122nd on the FedEx list (27) | 232 | − | ↓ | |
| (United States) Vince Covello | Ranked 20 in 2019 Korn Ferry Tour regular season (27) | 236 | − | ↓ | |
| (United States) Chad Collins | Requires 363 FedExCup points from 4 events (29) | − | − | = | |
| (United States) Jim Knous | Requires 152 FedExCup points from 2 events (29) | − | − | = | |
(30) Players winning three Web.com Tour events in the current season (alphabetical order).
| (Chile) Mito Pereira | Three Win Promotion with win at BMW Charity Pro-Am (30) | - | 180 | = | |
(31) Minor Medical Extension (alphabetical order).
| (32) Reorder Category 32a | (32a) Twenty-five finishers beyond 125th place on prior season's FedExCup points list (126-150) | | | | |
| (United States) Josh Teater | Ranked 142 in 2020 FedEx Cup points list (32a) | 142 | 194 | ↓ | |
| (United States) Ben Martin | Ranked 126-150 in 2019 FedExCup points list based upon medical extension (32a) | 162 | 177 | ↓ | |
| (United States) Peter Uihlein | Ranked 133 in 2019 FedEx Cup points list (32a) | 166 | 175 | ↓ | |
| (United States) Wes Roach | Ranked 134 in 2019 FedEx Cup points list (32a) | 173 | 208 | ↓ | |
| (United States) Zack Sucher | Ranked 144 in 2019 FedEx Cup points list (32a) | 176 | 230 | ↓ | |
| (United States) Dominic Bozzelli | Ranked 139 in 2019 FedEx Cup points list (32a) | 177 | 228 | ↓ | |
| (United States) Shawn Stefani | Ranked 127 in 2019 FedEx Cup points list (32a) | 187 | 241 | ↓ | |
| (United States) Roberto Castro | Ranked 142 in 2019 FedEx Cup points list (32a) | 196 | 215 | ↓ | |
| (United States) Bill Haas | Ranked 140 in 2019 FedEx Cup points list (32a) | 209 | 197 | ↓ | |
| (United States) Johnson Wagner | Ranked 141 in 2019 FedEx Cup points list (32a) | 224 | 217 | ↓ | |
| (United States) Ryan Blaum | Ranked 137 in 2019 FedEx Cup points list (32a) | − | 236 | ↓ | |
| (Germany) Martin Kaymer | Ranked 150 in 2019 FedEx Cup points list (32a) | − | 216 | ↓ | |
| (Colombia) Camilo Villegas | Met the threshold for conditional status by 51 FedExCup Points (32a) (‡22) | − | 130 | = | |
(33) Nonexempt, major medical/family crisis
| (34) Reorder Categories 35-39 | (35) Past Champions, Team Tournament Winners and Veteran Members beyond 150 on money list | | | | |
| (34) Reorder Categories 35-39 | (36) Past Champion Members, excluding team events | | | | |
| (34) Reorder Categories 35-39 | (37) Special Temporary: Non-members who earn more than the 150th player on the 2019 FedEx Cup list | | | | |
| (34) Reorder Categories 35-39 | (38) Team Tournament Winners | | | | |
| (34) Reorder Categories 35-39 | (39) Veteran Member (150+ cuts made) | | | | |
| (United States) Will Zalatoris | Korn Ferry Tour member. Gained Special Temporary status after T16 at 2020 Bermuda Championship (37) | - | - | ↑ | |
| (Scotland) Robert MacIntyre | Gained Special Temporary status after T15 at 2021 WGC-FedEx St. Jude Invitational (37) | - | - | ↓ | |
| (England) Lee Westwood | 2 PGA Tour wins (36) | − | 50 | ↑ | |
| (United States) John Huh | Fell 88 FedExCup points shy from fulfilling Major Medical Extension, 1 PGA tour win and finished beyond 150th on the money list (35) (‡22) | 213 | 153 | = | |
| (United States) Sean O'Hair | Fell 176 FedExCup points shy from fulfilling Major Medical Extension, 4 PGA tour wins and finished beyond 150th on the money list (35) (‡22) | 238 | 168 | = | |
| (Republic of Ireland) Pádraig Harrington | Fell 108 FedExCup points shy from fulfilling Minor Medical Extension, 6 PGA tour wins and finished beyond 150th on the money list (35) (‡31) | − | 169 | = | |
| (Sweden) David Lingmerth | 1 PGA Tour win and finished beyond 150th on the money list (35) | 226 | 199 | = | |
| (United States) Jonathan Byrd | 5 PGA Tour wins and finished beyond 150th on the money list (35) | 203 | 206 | = | |
| (Australia) Greg Chalmers | Fell 234 FedExCup points shy from fulfilling Major Medical Extension, 1 PGA tour win and finished beyond 150th on the money list (35) (‡22) | 245 | 209 | = | |
| (United States) Ricky Barnes | 150+ cuts made and finished beyond 150th on the money list (35) | 195 | 211 | = | |
| (South Korea) Bae Sang-moon | 2 PGA Tour wins and finished beyond 150th on the money list (35) | 221 | 218 | = | |
| (Germany) Bernhard Langer | 3 PGA Tour wins and finished beyond 150th on the money list (35) | 243 | 219 | = | |
| (United States) Robert Garrigus | 1 PGA Tour win and finished beyond 150th on the money list (35) | 229 | 224 | = | |
| (Canada) Mike Weir | 8 PGA Tour wins and finished beyond 150th on the money list (35) | − | 226 | = | |
| (Argentina) Andrés Romero | 1 PGA Tour win and finished beyond 150th on the money list (35) | − | 227 | = | |
| (Sweden) Richard S. Johnson | 1 PGA Tour win and finished beyond 150th on the money list (35) | − | 229 | = | |
| (United States) George McNeill | 2 PGA Tour wins and finished beyond 150th on the money list (35) | 175 | 231 | = | |
| (United States) D. A. Points | Fell 350 FedExCup points shy from fulfilling Major Medical Extension, 3 PGA tour wins and finished beyond 150th on the money list (35) (‡22) | − | 232 | = | |
| (United States) Charlie Beljan | 1 PGA Tour win and finished beyond 150th on the money list (35) | − | 233 | = | |
| (United States) Derek Ernst | 1 PGA Tour win and finished beyond 150th on the money list (35) | 235 | 234 | = | |
| (United States) J. J. Henry | 5 PGA Tour wins and finished beyond 150th on the money list (35) | 239 | 237 | = | |
| (Spain) José María Olazábal | 6 PGA Tour wins (36) | − | 238 | = | |
| (United States) Jason Bohn | 2 PGA Tour wins and finished beyond 150th on the money list (35) | − | 240 | = | |
| (Germany) Alex Čejka | 1 PGA Tour win and finished beyond 150th on the money list (35) | 204 | 242 | = | |
| (United States) Fred Funk | 8 PGA Tour wins (36) | − | 244 | = | |
| (United States) Tommy Gainey | 1 PGA Tour win and finished beyond 150th on the money list (35) | 223 | 245 | = | |
| (South Africa) Retief Goosen | 7 PGA Tour wins (36) | − | 246 | = | |
| (India) Arjun Atwal | 1 PGA Tour win and finished beyond 150th on the money list (35) | 215 | 247 | = | |
| (United States) Parker McLachlin | 1 PGA Tour win and finished beyond 150th on the money list (35) | 251 | 250 | = | |
| (United States) Harrison Frazar | Fell 320 FedExCup points or $510,686 shy from fulfilling Major Medical Extension, 1 PGA tour win and finished beyond 150th on the money list (35) (‡22) | − | − | = | |
| (United States) Chad Campbell | 4 PGA Tour wins and finished beyond 150th on the money list (35) | 200 | − | = | |
| (United States) Ben Crane | 5 PGA Tour wins and finished beyond 150th on the money list (35) | 214 | − | = | |
| (Sweden) Carl Pettersson | 5 PGA Tour wins and finished beyond 150th on the money list (35) | 225 | − | = | |
| (United States) John Merrick | 2 PGA Tour wins and finished beyond 150th on the money list (35) | 218 | − | = | |
| (Sweden) Daniel Chopra | 2 PGA Tour wins and finished beyond 150th on the money list (35) | 242 | − | = | |
| (South Africa) Ernie Els | 19 PGA Tour wins and finished beyond 150th on the money list (35) | 234 | − | = | |
| (Australia) Rod Pampling | 3 PGA Tour wins and finished beyond 150th on the money list (35) | 227 | − | = | |
| (United States) Rich Beem | 3 PGA Tour wins and finished beyond 150th on the money list (35) | 241 | − | = | |
| (United States) Tim Herron | 4 PGA Tour wins and finished beyond 150th on the money list (35) | 240 | − | = | |
| (United States) Chris Couch | 1 PGA Tour win and finished beyond 150th on the money list (35) | 230 | − | = | |
| (England) Brian Davis | 150+ cuts made and finished beyond 150th on the money list (35) | 249 | − | = | |
| (United States) Dicky Pride | 1 PGA Tour win and finished beyond 150th on the money list (35) | 250 | − | = | |
| (United States) Omar Uresti | 150+ cuts made and finished beyond 150th on the money list (35) | 253 | − | = | |
| (Australia) Mark Hensby | 1 PGA Tour win and finished beyond 150th on the money list (35) | − | − | = | |
| (United States) Ted Purdy | 1 PGA Tour win and finished beyond 150th on the money list (35) | 246 | − | = | |
| (Zimbabwe) Brendon de Jonge | 150+ cuts made and finished beyond 150th on the money list (35) | 251 | − | = | |
| (Paraguay) Carlos Franco | 4 PGA Tour wins and finished beyond 150th on the money list (35) | 253 | − | = | |
| (United States) Eric Axley | 1 PGA Tour win and finished beyond 150th on the money list (35) | − | − | = | |
| (South Korea) Yang Yong-eun | 2 PGA Tour wins and finished beyond 150th on the money list (35) | − | − | = | |
| (United States) John Rollins | 3 PGA Tour wins and finished beyond 150th on the money list (35) | − | − | = | |
| (United States) Fred Couples | 15 PGA Tour wins and finished beyond 150th on the money list (35) | − | − | = | |
| (Australia) Robert Allenby | 4 PGA Tour wins and finished beyond 150th on the money list (35) | − | − | = | |
| (United States) Smylie Kaufman | 1 PGA Tour win and finished beyond 150th on the money list (35) | − | − | = | |
| (United States) Tom Lehman | 5 PGA Tour wins and finished beyond 150th on the money list (35) | − | − | = | |
| (United States) Ken Duke | 1 PGA Tour win and finished beyond 150th on the money list (35) | − | − | = | |
| (United States) Will MacKenzie | 2 PGA Tour wins and finished beyond 150th on the money list (35) | − | − | = | |
| (United States) John Daly | 5 PGA Tour wins and finished beyond 150th on the money list (35) | − | − | = | |
| (United States) Heath Slocum | 4 PGA Tour wins and finished beyond 150th on the money list (35) | − | − | = | |
| (United States) Jonathan Kaye | 2 PGA Tour wins and finished beyond 150th on the money list (35) | − | − | = | |
| (United States) David Duval | 13 PGA Tour wins and finished beyond 150th on the money list (35) | − | − | = | |
| (United States) Mark Wilson | 5 PGA Tour wins and finished beyond 150th on the money list (35) | − | − | = | |
| (United States) Robert Gamez | 3 PGA Tour wins and finished beyond 150th on the money list (35) | − | − | = | |
| (United States) Frank Lickliter II | 2 PGA Tour wins and finished beyond 150th on the money list (35) | − | − | = | |
| (United States) Paul Stankowski | 2 PGA Tour wins and finished beyond 150th on the money list (35) | − | − | = | |
| (United States) Keith Clearwater | 2 PGA Tour wins and finished beyond 150th on the money list (35) | − | − | = | |
| (United States) Shaun Micheel | 1 PGA Tour win and finished beyond 150th on the money list (35) | − | − | = | |
| (United States) Steve Jones | 8 PGA Tour wins (36) | − | − | ↑ | |
| (United States) Rocco Mediate | 6 PGA Tour wins (36) | − | − | ↑ | |
| (Scotland) Sandy Lyle | 6 PGA Tour wins (36) | − | − | ↑ | |
| (United States) Woody Austin | 4 PGA Tour wins (36) | − | − | ↑ | |
| (United States) Larry Mize | 4 PGA Tour wins (36) | − | − | ↑ | |
| (Northern Ireland) Darren Clarke | 3 PGA Tour wins (36) | − | − | ↑ | |
| (United States) Paul Goydos | 2 PGA Tour wins (36) | − | − | ↑ | |
| (United States) Matt Gogel | 1 PGA Tour win (36) | − | − | ↑ | |
| (United States) David Frost | 10 PGA Tour wins and finished beyond 150th on the money list (35) | − | − | ↓ | |
| (United States) Boo Weekley | 3 PGA Tour wins and finished beyond 150th on the money list (35) | 202 | − | ↓ | |
| (United States) Scott McCarron | 3 PGA Tour wins and finished beyond 150th on the money list (35) | − | − | ↓ | |
| (United States) Olin Browne | 3 PGA Tour wins and finished beyond 150th on the money list (35) | − | − | ↓ | |
| (United States) Cameron Beckman | 3 PGA Tour wins and finished beyond 150th on the money list (35) | − | − | ↓ | |
| (United States) Billy Hurley III | 1 PGA Tour win and finished beyond 150th on the money list (35) | − | − | ↓ | |
| (Sweden) Freddie Jacobson | 1 PGA Tour win and finished beyond 150th on the money list (35) | − | − | ↓ | |
| (United States) Jason Gore | 1 PGA Tour win and finished beyond 150th on the money list (35) | − | − | ↓ | |
| (United States) Glen Day | 1 PGA Tour win and finished beyond 150th on the money list (35) | − | − | ↓ | |
| (United States) Spike McRoy | 1 PGA Tour win and finished beyond 150th on the money list (35) | − | − | ↓ | |
| (United States) Guy Boros | 1 PGA Tour win and finished beyond 150th on the money list (35) | − | − | ↓ | |
| (South Korea) Charlie Wi | 150+ cuts made and finished beyond 150th on the money list (35) | − | − | ↓ | |
| (United States) Brett Quigley | 150+ cuts made and finished beyond 150th on the money list (35) | − | − | ↓ | |
| (United States) Tom Watson | 39 PGA Tour wins (36) | − | − | = | |
| (United States) Hale Irwin | 20 PGA Tour wins (36) | − | − | = | |
| (United States) Tom Kite | 19 PGA Tour wins (36) | − | − | = | |
| (United States) Mark O'Meara | 16 PGA Tour wins (36) | − | − | = | |
| (United States) Corey Pavin | 15 PGA Tour wins (36) | − | − | = | |
| (United States) Kenny Perry | 14 PGA Tour wins (36) | − | − | = | |
| (United States) Hal Sutton | 14 PGA Tour wins (36) | − | − | = | |
| (United States) Mark Calcavecchia | 13 PGA Tour wins (36) | − | − | = | |
| (United States) Jay Haas | 12 PGA Tour wins (36) | − | − | = | |
| (United States) Scott Hoch | 11 PGA Tour wins (36) | − | − | = | |
| (United States) John Cook | 11 PGA Tour wins (36) | − | − | = | |
| (United States) Larry Nelson | 10 PGA Tour wins (36) | − | − | = | |
| (Australia) Stuart Appleby | 9 PGA Tour wins (36) | − | − | = | |
| (Australia) Geoff Ogilvy | 8 PGA Tour wins (36) | − | − | = | |
| (United States) Brad Faxon | 8 PGA Tour wins (36) | − | − | = | |
| (United States) Lee Janzen | 8 PGA Tour wins (36) | − | − | = | |
| (United States) Loren Roberts | 8 PGA Tour wins (36) | − | − | = | |
| (United States) John Huston | 7 PGA Tour wins (36) | − | − | = | |
| (United States) Joey Sindelar | 7 PGA Tour wins (36) | − | − | = | |
| (United States) Mark Brooks | 7 PGA Tour wins (36) | − | − | = | |
| (United States) Peter Jacobsen | 7 PGA Tour wins (36) | − | − | = | |
| (United States) Bill Glasson | 7 PGA Tour wins (36) | − | − | = | |
| (United States) Scott Simpson | 7 PGA Tour wins (36) | − | − | = | |
| (United States) Jeff Sluman | 6 PGA Tour wins (36) | − | − | = | |
| (United States) Steve Pate | 6 PGA Tour wins (36) | − | − | = | |
| (United States) Bob Gilder | 6 PGA Tour wins (36) | − | − | = | |
| (United States) Scott Verplank | 5 PGA Tour wins (36) | − | − | = | |
| (United States) Billy Mayfair | 5 PGA Tour wins (36) | − | − | = | |
| (Sweden) Jesper Parnevik | 5 PGA Tour wins (36) | − | − | = | |
| (United States) Dan Forsman | 5 PGA Tour wins (36) | − | − | = | |
| (United States) Blaine McCallister | 5 PGA Tour wins (36) | − | − | = | |
| (United States) Bob Estes | 4 PGA Tour wins (36) | − | − | = | |
| (Canada) Stephen Ames | 4 PGA Tour wins (36) | − | − | = | |
| (United States) Steve Flesch | 4 PGA Tour wins (36) | − | − | = | |
| (United States) Joe Durant | 4 PGA Tour wins (36) | − | − | = | |
| (United States) Billy Andrade | 4 PGA Tour wins (36) | − | − | = | |
| (United States) Duffy Waldorf | 4 PGA Tour wins (36) | − | − | = | |
| (United States) Michael Bradley | 4 PGA Tour wins (36) | − | − | = | |
| (Argentina) Ángel Cabrera | 3 PGA Tour wins (36) | − | − | = | |
| (United States) Chris DiMarco | 3 PGA Tour wins (36) | − | − | = | |
| (United States) Jeff Maggert | 3 PGA Tour wins (36) | − | − | = | |
| (United States) Kirk Triplett | 3 PGA Tour wins (36) | − | − | = | |
| (United States) Bart Bryant | 3 PGA Tour wins (36) | − | − | = | |
| (United States) Gene Sauers | 3 PGA Tour wins (36) | − | − | = | |
| (United States) Gary Hallberg | 3 PGA Tour wins (36) | − | − | = | |
| (South Africa) Trevor Immelman | 2 PGA Tour wins (36) | − | − | = | |
| (United States) Tom Pernice Jr. | 2 PGA Tour wins (36) | − | − | = | |
| (United States) Dudley Hart | 2 PGA Tour wins (36) | − | − | = | |
| (United States) Tommy Armour III | 2 PGA Tour wins (36) | − | − | = | |
| (United States) Troy Matteson | 2 PGA Tour wins (36) | − | − | = | |
| (Australia) Craig Parry | 2 PGA Tour wins (36) | − | − | = | |
| (Australia) Steven Bowditch | 2 PGA Tour wins (36) | − | − | = | |
| (United States) Todd Hamilton | 2 PGA Tour wins (36) | − | − | = | |
| (Argentina) José Coceres | 2 PGA Tour wins (36) | − | − | = | |
| (United States) Donnie Hammond | 2 PGA Tour wins (36) | − | − | = | |
| (United States) Ted Tryba | 2 PGA Tour wins (36) | − | − | = | |
| (United States) Brian Henninger | 2 PGA Tour wins (36) | − | − | = | |
| (United States) John Inman | 2 PGA Tour wins (36) | − | − | = | |
| (United States) Cody Gribble | 1 PGA Tour win (36) | − | − | = | |
| (United States) Kevin Sutherland | 1 PGA Tour wins (36) | − | − | = | |
| (United States) Tim Petrovic | 1 PGA Tour wins (36) | − | − | = | |
| (Australia) Peter Lonard | 1 PGA Tour wins (36) | − | − | = | |
| (United States) Tom Byrum | 1 PGA Tour win (36) | − | − | = | |
| (United States) Neal Lancaster | 1 PGA Tour win (36) | − | − | = | |
| (United States) Greg Kraft | 1 PGA Tour win (36) | − | − | = | |
| (United States) Russ Cochran | 1 PGA Tour win (36) | − | − | = | |
| (United States) Jay Don Blake | 1 PGA Tour win (36) | − | − | = | |
| (United States) Chris Smith | 1 PGA Tour win (36) | − | − | = | |
| (United States) Jim Carter | 1 PGA Tour win (36) | − | − | = | |
| (New Zealand) Grant Waite | 1 PGA Tour win (36) | − | − | = | |
| (United States) Brandel Chamblee | 1 PGA Tour win (36) | − | − | = | |
| (United States) Brad Bryant | 1 PGA Tour win (36) | − | − | = | |
| (United States) Willie Wood | 1 PGA Tour win (36) | − | − | = | |
| (United States) Mike Heinen | 1 PGA Tour win (36) | − | − | = | |
| (United States) Derek Lamely | 1 PGA Tour win (36) | − | − | = | |
| (Taiwan) Chen Tze-chung | 1 PGA Tour win (36) | − | − | = | |
| (United States) Wes Short Jr. | 1 PGA Tour win (36) | − | − | = | |
| (United States) Brandt Jobe | 150+ career cuts (39) | − | − | = | |
| (United States) Skip Kendall | 150+ career cuts (39) | − | − | = | |
| (United States) Michael Allen | 150+ career cuts (39) | − | − | = | |
| (United States) Jay Williamson | 150+ career cuts (39) | − | − | = | |
| (United States) Kent Jones | 150+ career cuts (39) | − | − | = | |
| (United States) Marco Dawson | 150+ career cuts (39) | − | − | = | |
| (United States) Dick Mast | 150+ career cuts (39) | − | − | = | |

== Players who lost PGA Tour status during the season ==
Players who began the season with a medical exemption, but failure to meet the requirements meant they lost their PGA Tour status:

| Player | Medical criteria | 2019–2020 FedEx Cup Rank |
|---|---|---|
| (United States) Jamie Lovemark | Fell 280 FedEx Cup points shy of fulfilling Major Medical Extension and 192 points shy of securing conditional status (‡22) | 211 |
