= Dormie Network Classic =

Tournament information
- Location: San Antonio, Texas
- Established: 2019
- Course: Briggs Ranch Golf Club
- Par: 72
- Length: 7,247 yards (6,627 m)
- Tour: Korn Ferry Tour
- Format: Stroke play
- Prize fund: US$550,000
- Month played: April
- Final year: 2019

Tournament record score
- Aggregate: 262 Zhang Xinjun (2019)
- To par: −26 as above

Final champion
- (China) Zhang Xinjun

Location map
- Location in the United States Location in Texas

The Dormie Network Classic was a golf tournament on the Korn Ferry Tour. It was played in April 2019 at Briggs Ranch Golf Club in San Antonio, Texas. Zhang Xinjun won the tournament by five strokes over Lanto Griffin and Chase Seiffert. All three players would finish the Web.com Tour regular season inside the top 25 on the points list, thereby graduating to the PGA Tour.

== Winners ==
Year	Winner	Score	To par	Margin of victory	Runners-up
2019	(China) Zhang Xinjun	262	−26	5 strokes	(United States) Lanto Griffin (United States) Chase Seiffert
