= Dylan Wu =

American professional golfer (born 1996)

Personal information
- Nationality: United States
- Born: July 20, 1996 (age 30) Medford, Oregon, U.S.
- Height: 5 ft 10 in (1.78 m)
- Weight: 165 lb (75 kg; 11.8 st)

Career
- Sport: Golf
- College: Northwestern University
- Turned professional: 2018
- Current tour: PGA Tour
- Former tours: Korn Ferry Tour; PGA Tour Canada; PGA Tour
- Professional wins: 1

Number of wins by tour
- Korn Ferry Tour: 1

Best results in major championships
- Masters Tournament: DNP
- PGA Championship: DNP
- U.S. Open: T31: 2021
- The Open Championship: DNP

Dylan Wu (born July 20, 1996) is an American professional golfer.

== College career ==
Wu played college golf for the Northwestern Wildcats, winning three individual tournaments in four years. He and the 2017–18 Northwestern golf team played in the 2018 NCAA Division I Men's Golf Championship, but they were eliminated in the team competition.

== Professional career ==
Wu turned professional at the conclusion of his college career and joined the third-tier PGA Tour Canada. He earned limited status on the Korn Ferry Tour for 2019 by reaching the final stage of Q School. In June 2019 his status yielded a start in the Lincoln Land Championship, in which he finished second, losing in a playoff to Zhang Xinjun. This result enabled him to play on the Korn Ferry Tour for the rest of the season; he finished 72nd on the regular-season points list, earning a spot in the Korn Ferry Tour Finals and fully-exempt status for the 2020 season.

On June 8, 2021, Wu qualified at the Woodmont Country Club in Rockville, Maryland for the 2021 U.S. Open.

== Amateur wins ==
- 2011 Emerson Junior Classic
- 2012 Oregon Junior Stroke Play
- 2013 AJGA Junior at Centennial
- 2014 Gifford Collegiate-CordeValle
- 2017 SU Invite, UNCG Grandover Collegiate

== Professional wins (1) ==
=== Korn Ferry Tour wins (1) ===
No.	Date	Tournament	Winning score	Margin of victory	Runner-up
1	Jul 25, 2021	Price Cutter Charity Championship	−27 (68-65-63-65=261)	2 strokes	(United States) Taylor Moore

Korn Ferry Tour playoff record (0–1)

No.	Year	Tournament	Opponent	Result
1	2019	Lincoln Land Championship	(China) Zhang Xinjun	Lost to birdie on third extra hole

== Results in major championships ==
Tournament	2021	2022	2023	2024	2025	2026
Masters Tournament						
PGA Championship						
U.S. Open	T31		T32			72
The Open Championship						

Did not play

"T" = Tied

== Results in The Players Championship ==
Tournament	2023	2024
The Players Championship	T35	T19

"T" indicates a tie for a place

== See also ==
- 2021 Korn Ferry Tour Finals graduates
- 2025 PGA Tour Qualifying School graduates
