= 2019 Korn Ferry Tour Finals graduates =

List of golfers

This is a list of golfers who graduated from the Korn Ferry Tour and Korn Ferry Tour Finals in 2019. The top 25 players on the Korn Ferry Tour's regular-season points list in 2019 earned PGA Tour cards for 2020. The Finals, which concluded on September 2, determined the other 25 players to earn PGA Tour cards and the initial priority order of all 50.

As in previous seasons, the Finals featured the top 75 players on the Korn Ferry Tour regular season points list, players ranked 126–200 on the PGA Tour's regular-season FedEx Cup points list (except players exempt through other means), non-members of the PGA Tour with enough regular-season FedEx Cup points to place 126–200, and special medical exemptions.

To determine the initial 2020 PGA Tour priority rank, the 25 Korn Ferry Tour regular-season graduates were alternated with the 25 Finals graduates. This priority order was then reshuffled several times during the 2020 season.

Scottie Scheffler was fully exempt for the 2020 PGA Tour season after leading both the full-season and the Finals points list.

== 2019 Korn Ferry Tour Finals ==
Player	2019 Korn Ferry Tour regular season		2019 FedEx Cup	2019 Korn Ferry Tour Finals			The 25 Regular + Finals		Priority rank
Player	Rank	Points	2019 FedEx Cup	Rank	Without The 25	Points	Rank	Points	Priority rank
(United States) Scottie Scheffler*	3	1667		1		1268	1	2935	Exempt
(China) Zhang Xinjun	1	1962		58		85	2	2047	1
(United States) Matthew NeSmith*	46	482		2	1	1019			2
(United States) Robby Shelton^{†}	2	1788		T87		28	3	1816	3
(England) Tom Lewis*				3	2	1000			4
(United States) Harry Higgs*	5	1314		32		178	4	1491	5
(United States) Brandon Hagy			253	4	3	700			6
(United States) Lanto Griffin	6	1228		T28		186	5	1415	7
(United States) Kramer Hickok			161	5	4	661			8
(United States) Mark Hubbard	9	1121		14		289	6	1410	9
(Argentina) Fabián Gómez	109	243	169	6	5	633			10
(United States) Ryan Brehm	13	1097		13		300	7	1397	11
(Norway) Viktor Hovland*				7	6	620			12
(Norway) Kristoffer Ventura*	4	1359		93		24	8	1383	13
(United States) Brendon Todd			183	8	7	505			14
(Sweden) Henrik Norlander	11	1107		22		220	9	1327	15
(United States) Beau Hossler			145	9	8	482			16
(United States) Zac Blair	12	1099		34		174	10	1272	17
(England) Ben Taylor*	45	486		10	9	417			18
(United States) Bo Hoag*	7	1207		79		36	11	1244	19
(India) Anirban Lahiri			178	11	10	358			20
(Argentina) Nelson Ledesma*	8	1194		97		19	12	1212	21
(United States) Grayson Murray	100	269	214	12	11	333			22
(Australia) Rhein Gibson	10	1111		T84		31	13	1142	23
(United States) Tyler Duncan			163	15	12	283			24
(United States) Chase Seiffert*	15	938		57		88	14	1026	25
(Canada) David Hearn	163	83	174	16	13	283			26
(United States) Mark Anderson	14	969		111		10	15	979	27
(United States) Bronson Burgoon			135	17	14	281			28
(United States) Scott Harrington*	19	850		46		127	16	977	29
(United States) Chris Baker*	26	718		18	15	263			30
(Canada) Michael Gligic*	17	886		82		34	17	920	31
(United States) Robert Streb			128	19	16	257			32
(Denmark) Sebastian Cappelen*	16	905		n/a		0	18	905	33
(United States) Tom Hoge			159	20	17	247			34
(United States) Vince Whaley*	25	761		42		141	19	902	35
(Australia) Cameron Percy	58	420		21	18	243			36
(Puerto Rico) Rafael Campos*	18	869		n/a		0	20	869	37
(United States) Hank Lebioda			148	23	19	203			38
(United States) Vince Covello*	20	814		105		12	21	826	39
(United States) Rob Oppenheim	35	572		24	20	196			40
(United States) Michael Gellerman*	21	797		T115		8	22	806	41
(Australia) Cameron Davis			160	25	21	193			42
(United States) Maverick McNealy*	23	787		T112		9	23	796	43
(United States) Joseph Bramlett	32	609		26	22	189			44
(United States) Tyler McCumber*	22	791		n/a		0	24	791	45
(United States) Doug Ghim*	52	459		27	23	188			46
(New Zealand) Tim Wilkinson	24	775		n/a		0	25	775	47
(United States) Richy Werenski			126	T28	T24	186			48
(United States) D. J. Trahan			164	T28	T24	186			49

*PGA Tour rookie in 2020
^{†}First-time PGA Tour member in 2020, but ineligible for rookie status due to having played eight or more PGA Tour events as a professional in a previous season

- Earned spot in Finals through PGA Tour.
- Earned spot in Finals through FedEx Cup points earned as a PGA Tour non-member.
- Earned spot in Finals through a medical extension.
- Indicates whether the player earned his card through the regular season or through the Finals.

== Results on 2020 PGA Tour ==
Player	Starts	Cuts made	Best finish	Money list rank	Earnings ($)	FedEx Cup rank
(United States) Scottie Scheffler*	23	18	3/T3x2	22	2,833,438	5
(China) Zhang Xinjun	25	13	T4	71	1,232,376	78
(United States) Matthew NeSmith*	23	13	T6	110	783,232	100
(United States) Robby Shelton^{†}	24	13	T3	72	1,232,306	66
(England) Tom Lewis*	12	5	T2	101	895,241	124
(United States) Harry Higgs*	25	16	2	70	1,251,570	55
(United States) Brandon Hagy	17	8	T12	157	341,322	152
(United States) Lanto Griffin	27	21	Win	16	3,188,586	18
(United States) Kramer Hickok	18	7	T15	176	253,646	170
(United States) Mark Hubbard	24	19	T2	46	1,840,473	44
(Argentina) Fabián Gómez	19	10	T3	132	564,722	126
(United States) Ryan Brehm	17	9	T31	200	162,079	197
(Norway) Viktor Hovland*	20	17	Win	41	1,982,275	20
(Norway) Kristoffer Ventura*	16	7	T18	170	278,309	156
(United States) Brendon Todd	25	18	Winx2	14	3,390,258	20
(Sweden) Henrik Norlander	23	14	T5	75	1,175,431	76
(United States) Beau Hossler	22	13	T9	125	658,088	116
(United States) Zac Blair	23	12	T4	116	745,273	113
(England) Ben Taylor*	17	4	T28	211	99,775	210
(United States) Bo Hoag*	22	13	T9	129	621,518	125
(India) Anirban Lahiri	13	5	T44	218	58,388	219
(Argentina) Nelson Ledesma*	17	3	T28	222	45,520	217
(United States) Grayson Murray	14	5	T10	179	244,150	186
(Australia) Rhein Gibson	16	10	T27	194	182,113	192
(United States) Tyler Duncan	25	16	Win	47	1,799,855	40
(United States) Chase Seiffert*	18	10	4	134	539,756	131
(Canada) David Hearn	19	8	T8	165	287,527	160
(United States) Mark Anderson	16	9	T21	169	278,630	158
(United States) Bronson Burgoon	19	9	T6	131	589,539	130
(United States) Scott Harrington*	22	11	T2	96	951,211	98
(United States) Chris Baker*	17	9	T20	173	270,300	163
(Canada) Michael Gligic*	18	8	T21	181	238,411	168
(United States) Robert Streb	19	7	T5	148	415,258	145
(Denmark) Sebastian Cappelen*	19	8	T6	150	371,482	157
(United States) Tom Hoge	24	13	2	45	1,857,073	50
(United States) Vince Whaley*	15	6	T9	188	207,571	183
(Australia) Cameron Percy	17	8	T7	142	470,679	143
(Puerto Rico) Rafael Campos*	9	5	T18	209	119,257	208
(United States) Hank Lebioda	20	8	T3	147	436,840	140
(United States) Vince Covello*	10	1	T47	238	19,035	236
(United States) Rob Oppenheim	21	11	T9	144	454,470	138
(United States) Michael Gellerman*	15	7	T38	208	125,992	206
(Australia) Cameron Davis	20	11	T8	103	857,225	84
(United States) Maverick McNealy*	23	17	T5	67	1,293,984	68
(United States) Joseph Bramlett	18	10	T9	138	495,690	141
(United States) Tyler McCumber*	20	10	T20	167	284,230	161
(United States) Doug Ghim*	16	5	T18	192	187,442	184
(New Zealand) Tim Wilkinson	16	9	T20	161	307,772	149
(United States) Richy Werenski	17	12	Win	49	1,716,407	41
(United States) D. J. Trahan	17	7	T8	156	345,471	153

*PGA Tour rookie in 2020
^{†}First-time PGA Tour member in 2020, but ineligible for rookie status due to having played eight or more PGA Tour events in a previous season

- Promoted out of the graduate category for 2021: won or finished in the top 125 of the FedEx Cup points list.
- Remains in the graduate category for 2021: finished outside the top 125 on FedEx Cup list.

== Winners on the PGA Tour in 2020 ==
No.	Date	Player	Tournament	Winning score	Margin of victory	Runner(s)-up	Payout ($)
1	Oct 13, 2019	(United States) Lanto Griffin	Houston Open	−14 (66-74-65-69=274)	1 stroke	(United States) Scott Harrington (United States) Mark Hubbard	1,350,000
2	Nov 3, 2019	(United States) Brendon Todd	Bermuda Championship	−24 (68-63-67-62=260)	1 stroke	(United States) Harry Higgs	540,000
3	Nov 18, 2019	(United States) Brendon Todd (2)	Mayakoba Golf Classic	−20 (63-68-65-68=264)	1 stroke	(United States) Adam Long (Mexico) Carlos Ortiz (United States) Vaughn Taylor	1,296,000
4	Nov 24, 2019	(United States) Tyler Duncan	RSM Classic	−19 (67-61-70-65=263)	Playoff	(United States) Webb Simpson	1,188,000
5	Feb 23	(Norway) Viktor Hovland	Puerto Rico Open	−20 (68-66-64-70=268)	1 stroke	(United States) Josh Teater	540,000
6	Aug 2	(United States) Richy Werenski	Barracuda Championship	39 points (6-11-9-13)	1 point	(United States) Troy Merritt	630,000

== Runners-up on the PGA Tour in 2020 ==
No.	Date	Player	Tournament	Winner	Winning score	Runner-up score	Payout ($)
1	Sep 15, 2019	(United States) Tom Hoge	A Military Tribute at The Greenbrier	(Chile) Joaquín Niemann	−21 (65-62-68-64=259)	−15 (68-65-67-65=265)	817,500
2 & 3	Oct 13, 2019	(United States) Scott Harrington	Houston Open	(United States) Lanto Griffin	−14 (66-74-65-69=274)	−13 (69-67-72-67=275)	667,500
2 & 3	Oct 13, 2019	(United States) Mark Hubbard	Houston Open	(United States) Lanto Griffin	−14 (66-74-65-69=274)	−13 (68-69-69-69=275)	667,500
4	Nov 3, 2019	(United States) Harry Higgs	Bermuda Championship	(United States) Brendon Todd	−24 (68-63-67-62=260)	−20 (66-65-65-68=264)	327,000
5	Aug 2	(England) Tom Lewis	WGC-FedEx St. Jude Invitational	(United States) Justin Thomas	−13 (66-70-66-65=267)	−10 (73-70-61-66=270)	695,000
