= Michael Gligic =

Canadian professional golfer

Personal information
- Nationality: Canada
- Born: September 19, 1989 (age 37) Burlington, Ontario, Canada
- Height: 6 ft 4 in (1.93 m)
- Weight: 190 lb (86 kg; 14 st)
- Spouse: Natasha
- Children: 1

Career
- Sport: Golf
- Turned professional: 2008
- Current tour: PGA Tour
- Former tours: Korn Ferry Tour; PGA Tour Canada
- Professional wins: 2

Number of wins by tour
- Korn Ferry Tour: 1
- Other: 1

Michael Gligic (born September 19, 1989) is a Canadian professional golfer on the PGA Tour. He secured his PGA Tour membership by finishing 17th on the 2019 Korn Ferry Tour regular-season points list.

== Professional career ==
Gligic turned professional in 2008 and obtained full status on the Canadian Tour in 2009. He achieved his first professional victory in 2012 at the ATB Financial Classic, where he beat Matt Marshall in a playoff.

In 2018, Gligic was named the Freedom 55 Financial Canadian Player of the Year. He finished the year 16th on the PGA Tour Canada Order of Merit.

Gligic earned status on the Korn Ferry Tour for 2019 and claimed his first victory in February at the Panama Championship. A final-round 65 saw him finish one better than Zhang Xinjun. He finished 17th on the 2019 Korn Ferry Tour Regular Season points list, securing his playing rights on the PGA Tour for the first time in his career.

== Professional wins (2) ==
=== Korn Ferry Tour wins (1) ===
No.	Date	Tournament	Winning score	Margin of victory	Runner-up
1	Feb 10, 2019	Panama Championship	−8 (70-70-67-65=272)	1 stroke	(China) Zhang Xinjun

=== Canadian Tour wins (1) ===
No.	Date	Tournament	Winning score	Margin of victory	Runner-up
1	Jun 24, 2012	ATB Financial Classic	−14 (65-70-68-67=270)	Playoff	(United States) Matt Marshall

== Team appearances ==
Professional

- Aruba Cup (representing PGA Tour Canada): 2016

== See also ==
- 2019 Korn Ferry Tour Finals graduates
- 2021 Korn Ferry Tour Finals graduates
- 2022 Korn Ferry Tour Finals graduates
