= Chris Baker (golfer) =

American professional golfer (born 1986)

Personal information
- Full name: Christopher Ryan Baker
- Nationality: United States
- Born: March 1, 1986 (age 40) Brownstown, Indiana, U.S.
- Height: 6 ft 0 in (1.83 m)
- Weight: 165 lb (75 kg; 11.8 st)

Career
- Sport: Golf
- College: Iowa State University
- Turned professional: 2008
- Current tour: Korn Ferry Tour
- Former tours: PGA Tour; Challenge Tour; PGA Tour Latinoamérica eGolf Professional Tour
- Professional wins: 4

Number of wins by tour
- Challenge Tour: 1
- Other: 3

Best results in major championships
- Masters Tournament: DNP
- PGA Championship: DNP
- U.S. Open: T26: 2021
- The Open Championship: DNP

Christopher Ryan Baker (born March 1, 1986) is an American professional golfer who has played on the Challenge Tour and the Nationwide Tour.

== Amateur career ==
Baker was born in Seymour, Indiana. He won the 2003 Indiana High School State Championship and lettered in golf at Iowa State University, winning the 2007 Big Four Tournament, he graduated in 2008.

== Professional career ==
Baker turned professional in 2008 and began playing on mini-tours. He picked up his first professional victory at the NGA Hooters Tour Classic at Quail Crossing on the NGA Hooters Tour in 2009. In 2010, he won the River Hills Classic on the eGolf Professional Tour, which helped him finish sixth on the Tour's money list, earning him an exemption into the Moroccan Golf Classic on the Challenge Tour. He went on to win the event and took up membership on the Challenge Tour.

Baker returned to the United States in 2011. He began playing on the Nationwide Tour in June, but only made 3 cuts in 13 events. Baker returned to the eGolf Professional Tour and finished 29th on the money list in 2011.

== Professional wins (4) ==
=== Challenge Tour wins (1) ===
No.	Date	Tournament	Winning score	Margin of victory	Runners-up
1	Jun 20, 2010	Moroccan Golf Classic	−13 (69-66-72-68=275)	2 strokes	(Spain) Jesús María Arruti, (Argentina) Pablo Del Grosso

=== NGA Hooters Tour wins (1) ===
No.	Date	Tournament	Winning score	Margin of victory	Runners-up
1	May 23, 2009	NGA Hooters Tour Classic	−27 (66-67-63-61=257)	2 strokes	(Wales) Ben Briscoe, (United States) Michael Lavery

=== eGolf Professional Tour wins (1) ===
No.	Date	Tournament	Winning score	Margin of victory	Runner-up
1	May 1, 2010	River Hills Classic	−15 (69-68-70-66=273)	3 strokes	(United States) Derek Oakey

=== Other wins (1) ===
- 2021 Orange County Fall Classic

== Playoff record ==
Web.com Tour playoff record (0–1)

No.	Year	Tournament	Opponent	Result
1	2017	Panama Claro Championship	(United States) Andrew Putnam	Lost to birdie on first extra hole

== Results in major championships ==
Tournament	2021
Masters Tournament	
PGA Championship	
U.S. Open	T26
The Open Championship	

Did not play

"T" = tied

== See also ==
- 2019 Korn Ferry Tour Finals graduates
