= Zhang Xinjun =

Chinese professional golfer (born 1987)

Personal information
- Nationality: China
- Born: 10 June 1987 (age 39) Shanxi, China
- Height: 6 ft 1 in (1.85 m)
- Weight: 165 lb (75 kg; 11.8 st)

Career
- Sport: Golf
- Turned professional: 2010
- Current tour: China Tour
- Former tours: PGA Tour; Korn Ferry Tour
- Professional wins: 7

Number of wins by tour
- Korn Ferry Tour: 2
- Other: 5

Best results in major championships
- Masters Tournament: DNP
- PGA Championship: CUT: 2020
- U.S. Open: DNP
- The Open Championship: DNP

Achievements and awards
- Korn Ferry Tour regular season points list winner: 2019

Zhang Xinjun (Chinese: 张新军; born 10 June 1987) is a Chinese professional golfer who currently plays on China Tour. He won twice on the Korn Ferry Tour in 2019 when he topped the regular season points list. In 2017, along with Dou Zecheng, he was one of the first Chinese players to gain their card on the PGA Tour.

== Amateur career ==
Zhang represented China at the 2010 Asian Games.

== Professional career ==
Zhang turned professional in 2010. Having won on the PGA Tour China in 2014 he qualified to join the second tier Web.com Tour in 2015 after finishing second on the Order of Merit. However, towards the end of the season he was banned for six months after having been found guilty of signing for incorrect scores on two occasions, and ultimately stayed in China for another season. The following year he won again and finished third on the Order of Merit to again earn his place on the Web.com Tour for 2016.

Having found limited opportunities on the Web.com Tour in 2016, Zhang again returned to China. He finished 5th on the Order of Merit to earn a return to the Web.com Tour. He played in all regular season tournaments and finished 20th on the Web.com Tour points list in 2017 to graduate to the PGA Tour for 2018. He did not manage to win enough points to retain his place on the PGA Tour during his rookie season and dropped back to the second tier for 2019.

Zhang claimed two victories on the now renamed Korn Ferry Tour in 2019, at the Dormie Network Classic and the Lincoln Land Championship, and finished the season on top of the regular season points list to regain his card on the PGA Tour for the 2019–20 season.

== Professional wins (7) ==
=== Korn Ferry Tour wins (2) ===
No.	Date	Tournament	Winning score	Margin of victory	Runner(s)-up
1	28 Apr 2019	Dormie Network Classic	−26 (63-64-65-70=262)	5 strokes	(United States) Lanto Griffin, (United States) Chase Seiffert
2	16 Jun 2019	Lincoln Land Championship	−15 (68-72-63-66=269)	Playoff	(United States) Dylan Wu

Korn Ferry Tour playoff record (1–0)

No.	Year	Tournament	Opponent	Result
1	2019	Lincoln Land Championship	(United States) Dylan Wu	Won with birdie on third extra hole

=== China Tour wins (4) ===
No.	Date	Tournament	Winning score	Margin of victory	Runner(s)-up
1	15 Jun 2014	Beijing Open	−19 (66-66-70-67=269)	2 strokes	(New Zealand) Mathew Perry
2	18 Oct 2015	Chongqing Jiangnan NewTown KingRun Open	−15 (69-74-65-65=273)	4 strokes	(Australia) Bryden Macpherson
3	25 Nov 2018	Chongqing Kingrun Open (2)	−16 (68-71-67-66=272)	8 strokes	(China) Zhang Jia
4	25 May 2025	Hengdian Celebrity Pro-Am Golf Championship	−30 (62-62-68-66=258)	3 strokes	(China) Chen Guxin, (Taiwan) Lawrence Ting

=== Other wins (1) ===
- 2012 China Tour Final

== Results in major championships ==
Results not in chronological order in 2020.

Tournament	2020
Masters Tournament	
PGA Championship	CUT
U.S. Open	
The Open Championship	NT

CUT = missed the halfway cut
NT = no tournament due to COVID-19 pandemic

== Results in The Players Championship ==
Tournament	2021
The Players Championship	CUT

CUT = missed the halfway cut

== Results in World Golf Championships ==
Results not in chronological order before 2015.

Tournament	2011	2012	2013	2014	2015	2016	2017	2018	2019
Championship									
Match Play									
Invitational									
Champions	T13	T56			T46	T21	T44	T50	T38

Did not play

"T" = tied

== Team appearances ==
Professional

- World Cup (representing China): 2011

== See also ==
- 2017 Web.com Tour Finals graduates
- 2019 Korn Ferry Tour Finals graduates
