= Tom Lewis (golfer) =

English professional golfer (born 1991)

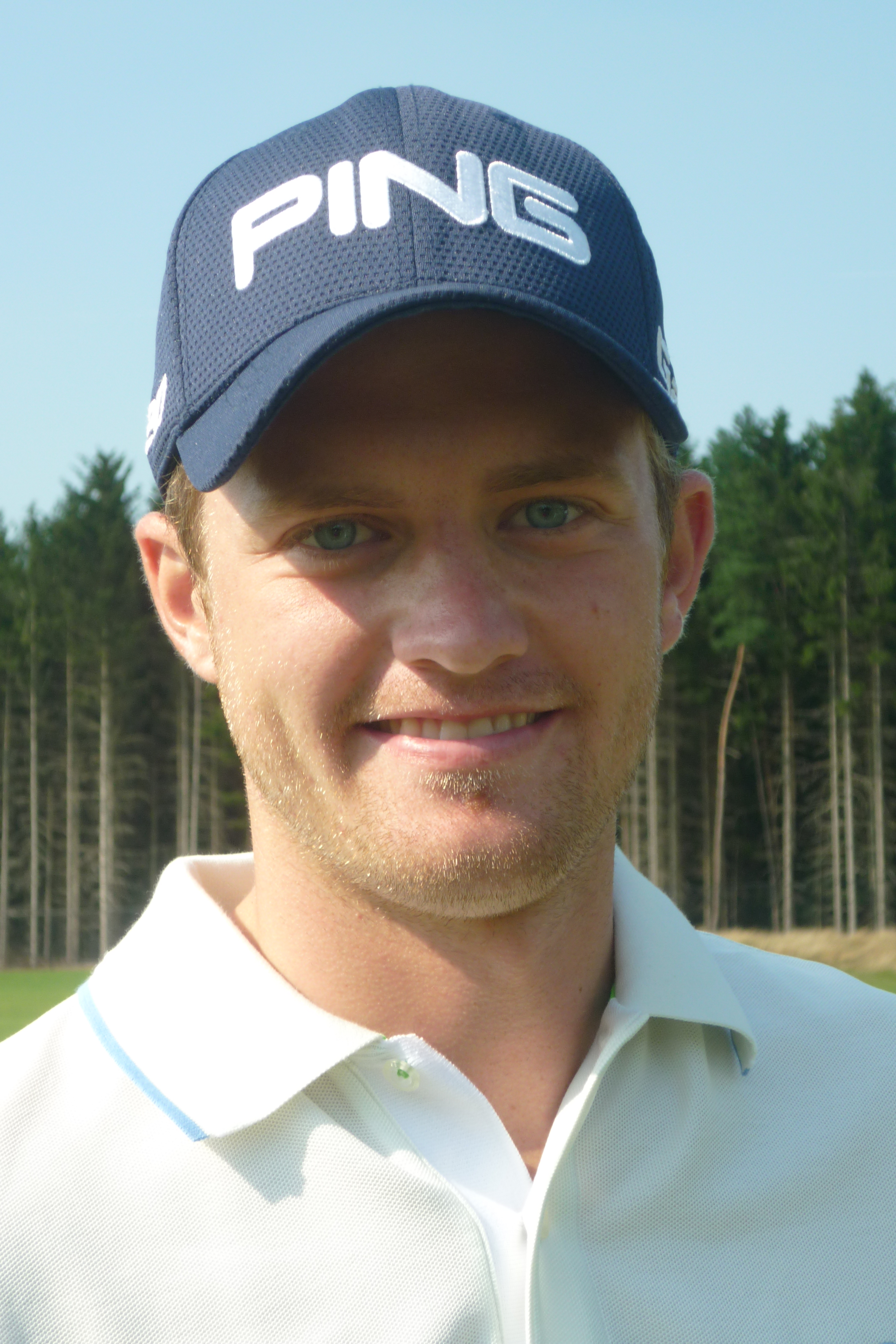

Personal information
- Nationality: England
- Born: 5 January 1991 (age 35) Welwyn Garden City, England
- Height: 5 ft 10 in (1.78 m)
- Weight: 165 lb (75 kg; 11.8 st)

Career
- Sport: Golf
- Turned professional: 2011
- Current tour: European Tour
- Former tours: PGA Tour; Challenge Tour; Korn Ferry Tour
- Professional wins: 4
- Highest ranking: 46 (2 August 2020) (as of 8 November 2026)

Number of wins by tour
- European Tour: 2
- Korn Ferry Tour: 1
- Challenge Tour: 1

Best results in major championships
- Masters Tournament: DNP
- PGA Championship: T71: 2021
- U.S. Open: CUT: 2014, 2018, 2020
- The Open Championship: T11: 2019

Achievements and awards
- Sir Henry Cotton Rookie of the Year: 2011

Tom Lewis (born 5 January 1991) is an English professional golfer who currently plays on the European Tour. He has also played on the PGA Tour.

== Amateur career ==
In 2009, Lewis won the Boys Amateur Championship at Royal St George's. In 2010, he lost to Peter O'Malley in a playoff for the New South Wales Open, and then tied for 12th place at the Australian Open. This was followed by victory on the Old Course at St Andrews in the 2011 St Andrews Links Trophy.

Lewis qualified for the 2011 Open Championship at Royal St George's via Local Final Qualifying at Rye. In the first round he shot a five-under-par 65, giving him a share of the lead alongside Thomas Bjørn. This was the lowest single-round score by an amateur in Open Championship history, and the equal lowest in any major championship. It made him the first amateur to lead a major after a round since Mike Reid in the 1976 U.S. Open and the first amateur to lead the Open Championship since Michael Bonallack in 1968. One of Lewis's first-round partners was Tom Watson, after whom he is named. Lewis finished tied for 30th place and as the low amateur, he won the Silver Medal.

== Professional career ==
Lewis turned professional after the 2011 Walker Cup. He made his professional debut at the Austrian Golf Open in September, shooting a two-over-par 74 in the first round. He recovered to finish in a tie for tenth. His maiden professional win came the following month at the Portugal Masters on the European Tour, shooting rounds of 70, 64, 68, and 65 to finish two shots clear of the field. It was his third professional start. In December he was crowned the European Tour's Sir Henry Cotton Rookie of the Year.

Lewis played on the European Tour from 2012 with limited success. He lost his place after the 2016 season but regained it after a good performance at Q-school.

Lewis showed a return to form in 2018. He played a number of the Challenge Tour events. He was joint third in the Swedish Challenge in August before winning the Bridgestone Challenge in September and finish joint third again in the Kazakhstan Open the following week. A week later he won his second Portugal Masters title on the European Tour. He had four other top-10 finishes on the European Tour, including a tie for fifth place in the Sky Sports British Masters and a tie for seventh in the DP World Tour Championship, Dubai. He finished 41st in the Order of Merit.

On 2 September 2019, Lewis won the Korn Ferry Tour Championship and earned his PGA Tour card for the 2019–20 season. It was his first career Korn Ferry start, qualifying for the Finals by earning enough points as a PGA Tour non-member.

Lewis finished as a runner-up in August 2020 at the WGC-FedEx St. Jude Invitational, three strokes behind winner Justin Thomas. This was Lewis' career best finish on the PGA Tour to date.

== Amateur wins ==
- 2009 Carris Trophy, Boys Amateur Championship
- 2011 St Andrews Links Trophy

== Professional wins (4) ==
=== European Tour wins (2) ===
No.	Date	Tournament	Winning score	Margin of victory	Runner(s)-up
1	16 Oct 2011	Portugal Masters	−21 (70-64-68-65=267)	2 strokes	(Spain) Rafa Cabrera-Bello
2	23 Sep 2018	Portugal Masters (2)	−22 (72-63-61-66=262)	3 strokes	(Australia) Lucas Herbert, (England) Eddie Pepperell

=== Korn Ferry Tour wins (1) ===
Legend
Finals events (1)
Other Korn Ferry Tour (0)

No.	Date	Tournament	Winning score	Margin of victory	Runner-up
1	2 Sep 2019	Korn Ferry Tour Championship	−23 (68-66-66-65=265)	5 strokes	(Argentina) Fabián Gómez

=== Challenge Tour wins (1) ===
No.	Date	Tournament	Winning score	Margin of victory	Runners-up
1	9 Sep 2018	Bridgestone Challenge	−23 (63-67-67-64=261)	5 strokes	(Australia) Dimitrios Papadatos, (Sweden) Sebastian Söderberg

== Playoff record ==
PGA Tour of Australasia playoff record (0–1)

No.	Year	Tournament	Opponents	Result
1	2010	NSW Open (as an amateur)	(Australia) Peter Cooke, (Australia) Peter O'Malley	O'Malley won with par on third extra hole Cooke eliminated by par on second hole

== Results in major championships ==
Results not in chronological order in 2020.

Tournament	2011	2012	2013	2014	2015	2016	2017	2018
Masters Tournament								
U.S. Open				CUT				CUT
The Open Championship	T30LA							T47
PGA Championship								

Tournament	2019	2020	2021
Masters Tournament			
PGA Championship	CUT	CUT	T71
U.S. Open		CUT	
The Open Championship	T11	NT	

Did not play

LA = Low Amateur
CUT = missed the half-way cut
"T" = tied
NT = No tournament due to COVID-19 pandemic

== Results in The Players Championship ==
Tournament	2021
The Players Championship	CUT

CUT = missed the halfway cut

== Results in World Golf Championships ==
Results not in chronological order before 2015.

Tournament	2011	2012	2013	2014	2015	2016	2017	2018	2019	2020
Championship									T65	
Match Play									T24	NT^{1}
Invitational		74								T2
Champions	76									NT^{1}

^{1}Cancelled due to COVID-19 pandemic

Top 10
Did not play

NT = No tournament
"T" = Tied

== Team appearances ==
Amateur

- European Boys' Team Championship (representing England): 2008, 2009
- Jacques Léglise Trophy (representing Great Britain & Ireland): 2008 (winners), 2009 (winners)
- European Amateur Team Championship (representing England): 2010 (winners)
- Eisenhower Trophy (representing England): 2010
- St Andrews Trophy (representing Great Britain & Ireland): 2010
- Walker Cup (representing Great Britain & Ireland): 2011 (winners)

== See also ==
- 2016 European Tour Qualifying School graduates
- 2019 Korn Ferry Tour Finals graduates
- 2023 European Tour Qualifying School graduates
- 2026 European Tour Qualifying School graduates
