= Chase Seiffert =

American golfer (born 1991)

Personal information
- Nationality: United States
- Born: August 12, 1991 (age 35) Panama City, Florida, U.S.
- Height: 6 ft 3 in (1.91 m)
- Weight: 200 lb (91 kg; 14 st)

Career
- Sport: Golf
- College: Florida State University
- Turned professional: 2013
- Current tour: PGA Tour
- Former tours: PGA Tour Canada; Korn Ferry Tour
- Professional wins: 1

Best results in major championships
- Masters Tournament: DNP
- PGA Championship: DNP
- U.S. Open: CUT: 2022
- The Open Championship: DNP

Chase Seiffert (born August 12, 1991) is an American professional golfer.

== Amateur career ==
Seiffert played college golf at Florida State University, where he was a two-time All-ACC selection.

As an amateur, Seiffert became the first person in the history of the Florida State Golf Association to ever capture their triple crown; the Amateur, the Florida Open and the Amateur Match Play Championships all in the same year.

== Professional career ==
During the 2016–17 season, Seiffert played three PGA Tour events by Monday qualifying. He Monday qualified for the 2018 Travelers Championship and finished T-9. In addition to winning $189,000, the finish generated enough non-member FedEx Cup points for him qualify for the 2018 Web.com Tour Finals. In the finals he finished 37th on the money list, earning him full status on the Web.com Tour for the 2019 season. In his rookie year, he finished the regular season 15th on the money list, earning a promotion to the PGA Tour for the 2019–20 season.

== Amateur wins ==
- 2011 Liz Kling Spring Invitational, Region XXII Championship
- 2012 Florida Amateur, Florida Amateur Match Play

== Professional wins ==
- 2012 Florida Open (as an amateur)

== Results in major championships ==
Tournament	2022
Masters Tournament	
PGA Championship	
U.S. Open	CUT
The Open Championship	

Did not play

CUT = missed the half-way cut

== See also ==
- 2019 Korn Ferry Tour Finals graduates
