= 2019 Korn Ferry Tour =

Golf tour season

2019 Korn Ferry Tour season
- Duration: January 13, 2019 – September 2, 2019
- Number of official events: 27
- Most wins: (United States) Scottie Scheffler (2) (United States) Robby Shelton (2) (Norway) Kristoffer Ventura (2) (China) Zhang Xinjun (2)
- Regular season points list: (China) Zhang Xinjun
- Finals points list: (United States) Scottie Scheffler
- Player of the Year: (United States) Scottie Scheffler
- Rookie of the Year: (United States) Scottie Scheffler

The 2019 Korn Ferry Tour (until June, the 2019 Web.com Tour) was the 30th season of the Korn Ferry Tour, the official development tour to the PGA Tour.

== Korn Ferry title sponsorship ==
In June, it was announced that the tour had signed a title sponsorship agreement with Korn Ferry, being renamed from the Web.com Tour to the Korn Ferry Tour.

== Schedule ==
The following table lists official events during the 2019 season.

| Date | Tournament | Location | Purse (US$) | Winner (Note: The number in parentheses after each winner's name is the number of Korn Ferry Tour events they had won up to and including that tournament. This information is only shown for Korn Ferry Tour members. It is rare for someone to accumulate many wins on the Korn Ferry Tour as success at this level usually leads to promotion to the PGA Tour.) | OWGR points | Notes |
|---|---|---|---|---|---|---|
| Jan 16 | The Bahamas Great Exuma Classic | Bahamas | 600,000 | (China) Dou Zecheng (2) | 14 | |
| Jan 23 | The Bahamas Great Abaco Classic | Bahamas | 600,000 | (Puerto Rico) Rafael Campos (1) | 14 | |
| Feb 3 | Country Club de Bogotá Championship | Colombia | 700,000 | (United States) Mark Anderson (2) | 14 | |
| Feb 10 | Panama Championship | Panama | 625,000 | (Canada) Michael Gligic (1) | 14 | |
| Feb 17 | LECOM Suncoast Classic | Florida | 550,000 | (United States) Mark Hubbard (1) | 14 | New tournament |
| Mar 24 | Chitimacha Louisiana Open | Louisiana | 550,000 | (United States) Vince Covello (1) | 14 | |
| Mar 31 | Savannah Golf Championship | Georgia | 550,000 | (United States) Dan McCarthy (1) | 14 | |
| Apr 21 | Robert Trent Jones Golf Trail Championship | Alabama | 550,000 | (United States) Lanto Griffin (2) | 14 | New tournament |
| Apr 28 | Dormie Network Classic | Texas | 550,000 | (China) Zhang Xinjun (1) | 14 | New tournament |
| May 5 | Nashville Golf Open | Tennessee | 550,000 | (United States) Robby Shelton (1) | 14 | |
| May 12 | KC Golf Classic | Missouri | 675,000 | (United States) Michael Gellerman (1) | 14 | |
| May 19 | Knoxville Open | Tennessee | 550,000 | (United States) Robby Shelton (2) | 14 | |
| May 26 | Evans Scholars Invitational | Illinois | 550,000 | (United States) Scottie Scheffler (1) | 14 | New tournament |
| Jun 2 | Rex Hospital Open | North Carolina | 650,000 | (Denmark) Sebastian Cappelen (2) | 14 | |
| Jun 9 | BMW Charity Pro-Am | South Carolina | 700,000 | (Australia) Rhein Gibson (1) | 14 | Pro-Am |
| Jun 16 | Lincoln Land Championship | Illinois | 550,000 | (China) Zhang Xinjun (2) | 14 | |
| Jun 24 | Wichita Open | Kansas | 625,000 | (Sweden) Henrik Norlander (2) | 14 | |
| Jun 30 | Utah Championship | Utah | 725,000 | (Norway) Kristoffer Ventura (1) | 14 | |
| Jul 7 | LECOM Health Challenge | New York | 600,000 | (United States) Ryan Brehm (2) | 14 | |
| Jul 14 | TPC Colorado Championship | Colorado | 600,000 | (Argentina) Nelson Ledesma (2) | 14 | New tournament |
| Jul 21 | Pinnacle Bank Championship | Nebraska | 600,000 | (Norway) Kristoffer Ventura (2) | 14 | |
| Jul 28 | Price Cutter Charity Championship | Missouri | 700,000 | (United States) Harry Higgs (1) | 14 | |
| Aug 4 | Ellie Mae Classic | California | 600,000 | (United States) Zac Blair (1) | 14 | |
| Aug 11 | WinCo Foods Portland Open | Oregon | 800,000 | (United States) Bo Hoag (1) | 14 | |
| Aug 18 | Nationwide Children's Hospital Championship | Ohio | 1,000,000 | (United States) Scottie Scheffler (2) | 16 | Finals event |
| Aug 25 | Albertsons Boise Open | Idaho | 1,000,000 | (United States) Matthew NeSmith (1) | 16 | Finals event |
| Sep 2 | Korn Ferry Tour Championship | Indiana | 1,000,000 | (England) Tom Lewis (1) | 20 | Finals event |

== Location of tournaments ==
Location of tournaments of the 2019 Korn Ferry Tour in the United States and the Bahamas.
Regular-season events
Regular-season finale
Finals events
Location of tournaments of the 2019 Korn Ferry Tour in Colombia and Panama.

== Points list ==
=== Regular season points list ===
The regular season points list was based on tournament results during the season, calculated using a points-based system. The top 25 players on the regular season points list earned status to play on the 2019–20 PGA Tour.

| Position | Player | Points |
|---|---|---|
| 1 | (China) Zhang Xinjun | 1,962 |
| 2 | (United States) Robby Shelton | 1,788 |
| 3 | (United States) Scottie Scheffler | 1,667 |
| 4 | (Norway) Kristoffer Ventura | 1,359 |
| 5 | (United States) Harry Higgs | 1,314 |

=== Finals points list ===
The Finals points list was based on tournament results during the Korn Ferry Tour Finals, calculated using a points-based system. The top 25 players on the Finals points list (not otherwise exempt) earned status to play on the 2019–20 PGA Tour.

| Position | Player | Points |
|---|---|---|
| 1 | (United States) Scottie Scheffler | 1,268 |
| 2 | (United States) Matthew NeSmith | 1,019 |
| 3 | (England) Tom Lewis | 1,000 |
| 4 | (United States) Brandon Hagy | 700 |
| 5 | (United States) Kramer Hickok | 661 |

== Awards ==
| Award | Winner | Ref. |
|---|---|---|
| Player of the Year (Jack Nicklaus Trophy) | (United States) Scottie Scheffler | |
| Rookie of the Year | (United States) Scottie Scheffler | |
