= 2012 Players Championship =

Tournament information
- Dates: May 10–13, 2012
- Location: Ponte Vedra Beach, Florida; 30.198°N 81.394°W
- Courses: TPC Sawgrass, Stadium Course
- Tour: PGA Tour

Statistics
- Par: 72
- Length: 7,215 yards (6,597 m)
- Field: 144 players, 72 after cut
- Cut: 144 (Even)
- Prize fund: $9.5 million
- Winner's share: $1.71 million

Champion
- (United States) Matt Kuchar
- 275 (−13)

Location map
- Location in the United States Location in Florida

The 2012 Players Championship was a golf tournament in Florida on the PGA Tour, held May 10–13 at TPC Sawgrass in Ponte Vedra Beach, southeast of Jacksonville. It was the 39th Players Championship and was won by Matt Kuchar, two strokes ahead of four runners-up.

Defending champion K. J. Choi missed the 36-hole cut by seven strokes.

== Venue ==
This was the 31st Players Championship held at the TPC at Sawgrass Stadium Course and it remained at 7,215 yards (6,597 m).

=== Course layout ===
The 2012 Players Championship
| Tee | Rating/Slope | 1 | 2 | 3 | 4 | 5 | 6 | 7 | 8 | 9 | Out | 10 | 11 | 12 | 13 | 14 | 15 | 16 | 17 | 18 | In | Total |
| Yards | n/a | 423 | 532 | 177 | 384 | 471 | 393 | 442 | 237 | 583 | 3,642 | 424 | 558 | 358 | 181 | 481 | 449 | 523 | 137 | 462 | 3,573 | 7,215 |
| Par | | 4 | 5 | 3 | 4 | 4 | 4 | 4 | 3 | 5 | 36 | 4 | 5 | 4 | 3 | 4 | 4 | 5 | 3 | 4 | 36 | 72 |

== Field ==
The field consisted of 144 players meeting criteria 1–12, plus the winner of the 2011 Senior Players Championship.

1. Winners of PGA Tour events since last Players

Keegan Bradley (2,3,5,9), K. J. Choi (2,3,6,9), Ben Crane (3,9), Ben Curtis, Luke Donald (2,3,7,9), Jason Dufner (2,3,9,11), Rickie Fowler (3,9), Harrison Frazar (3), Bill Haas (2,3,8,9), John Huh, Freddie Jacobson (2,3,9), Chris Kirk (3), Hunter Mahan (2,3,7,9,11), Rory McIlroy (5,9,11), George McNeill (3), Phil Mickelson (2,3,5,6,8,9,11), Bryce Molder (3), Kevin Na (3), Sean O'Hair (3), Carl Pettersson (3,9,11), Scott Piercy (3), Justin Rose (2,3,7,9,11), Adam Scott (2,3,7,9), Webb Simpson (2,3,9), Brandt Snedeker (2,3,9), Scott Stallings (3), Kyle Stanley (3,11), Steve Stricker (2,3,9), David Toms (2,3,9), Johnson Wagner (3,11), Nick Watney (2,3,7,9), Mark Wilson (2,3,9,11), Tiger Woods (5,7,9)

- Darren Clarke (5) and Dustin Johnson (2,3,9) did not play.

2. Top 30 from previous season's FedEx Cup points list

Aaron Baddeley (3,9), Jonathan Byrd (3), Jason Day (3,9), Charles Howell III (3), Matt Kuchar (3,9), Geoff Ogilvy (3), Chez Reavie (3), John Senden (3,9), Vijay Singh (3), Bo Van Pelt (3,9), Gary Woodland (3), Yang Yong-eun (3,5)

3. Top 125 from previous season's PGA Tour money list

Blake Adams, Robert Allenby, Arjun Atwal, Briny Baird, Ricky Barnes, Matt Bettencourt, Kris Blanks, Michael Bradley, Chad Campbell, Greg Chalmers, Kevin Chappell, Stewart Cink (5), Chris Couch, Brian Davis, Brendon de Jonge, Chris DiMarco, James Driscoll, Ernie Els (7,9), Jim Furyk (8,9), Tommy Gainey, Sergio García (6,9), Robert Garrigus, Brian Gay, Tom Gillis, Lucas Glover (5), Retief Goosen, Hunter Haas, Pádraig Harrington (5), David Hearn, J. J. Henry, Tim Herron, Charley Hoffman, J. B. Holmes, Ryuji Imada, Trevor Immelman (5), Brandt Jobe, Zach Johnson (9), Kang Sung-hoon, Robert Karlsson (9), Jerry Kelly, Martin Laird (9), Marc Leishman, Justin Leonard, Spencer Levin, Davis Love III, David Mathis, Troy Matteson, Billy Mayfair, Graeme McDowell (5,9), John Merrick, Ryan Moore, Joe Ogilvie, Nick O'Hern, Louis Oosthuizen (5,9), Jeff Overton, Ryan Palmer, Rod Pampling, Pat Perez, Tom Pernice Jr., Ian Poulter (7,9), John Rollins, Andrés Romero, Rory Sabbatini, Heath Slocum, Kevin Stadler, Brendan Steele, Kevin Streelman, Chris Stroud, Josh Teater, Michael Thompson, D. J. Trahan, Cameron Tringale, Jhonattan Vegas, Scott Verplank, Camilo Villegas, Jimmy Walker, Charlie Wi

- Paul Goydos, Anthony Kim, Steve Marino, D. A. Points, Charl Schwartzel (5,9), and Bubba Watson (2,3,5,9,11) did not play.

4. Top 125 from current season - Medical Extension

Bob Estes

5. Major champions from the past five years

Ángel Cabrera, Martin Kaymer (9)

6. Players Championship winners from the past five years

Tim Clark, Henrik Stenson

7. WGC winners from the past three years (WGC-HSBC Champions winners only from 2010–11, and only if PGA Tour members)

8. The Tour Championship winners from the past three years

9. Top 50 from the Official World Golf Ranking as of April 29

Bae Sang-moon, Paul Casey, Simon Dyson, Peter Hanson, Francesco Molinari, Álvaro Quirós, Lee Westwood

- Thomas Bjørn, Anders Hansen, Kim Kyung-tae, and Paul Lawrie did not play.

10. Nationwide Tour money leader from prior season

J. J. Killeen

11. Top 10 current year FedEx Cup points leaders as of April 29

12. Field filled to 144 through current year FedEx Cup standings as of April 29

Bud Cauley, Graham DeLaet, Ken Duke, Harris English, Matt Every, Brian Harman, Colt Knost, Jeff Maggert, John Mallinger

13. Senior Players champion from prior year (did not count against field of 144)

- Fred Couples did not play; therefore only 144 players competed.

== Round summaries ==
=== First round ===
Thursday, May 10, 2012

| Place | Player | Score | To par |
|---|---|---|---|
| T1 | (Scotland) Martin Laird | 65 | −7 |
| T1 | (England) Ian Poulter | 65 | −7 |
| 3 | (United States) Blake Adams | 66 | −6 |
| T4 | (United States) Ben Crane | 67 | −5 |
| T4 | (United States) Kevin Na | 67 | −5 |
| T6 | (South Korea) Bae Sang-moon | 68 | −4 |
| T6 | (United States) Jonathan Byrd | 68 | −4 |
| T6 | (United States) Ben Curtis | 68 | −4 |
| T6 | (England) Brian Davis | 68 | −4 |
| T6 | (United States) Harrison Frazar | 68 | −4 |
| T6 | (United States) Bill Haas | 68 | −4 |
| T6 | (United States) Matt Kuchar | 68 | −4 |
| T6 | (Australia) Adam Scott | 68 | −4 |
| T6 | (United States) Kevin Stadler | 68 | −4 |
| T6 | (United States) Michael Thompson | 68 | −4 |
| T6 | (Venezuela) Jhonattan Vegas | 68 | −4 |

=== Second round ===
Friday, May 11, 2012

| Place | Player | Score | To par |
|---|---|---|---|
| T1 | (United States) Zach Johnson | 70-66=136 | −8 |
| T1 | (United States) Kevin Na | 67-69=136 | −8 |
| T1 | (United States) Matt Kuchar | 68-68=136 | −8 |
| 4 | (United States) Harris English | 70-67=137 | −7 |
| T5 | (United States) Jonathan Byrd | 68-70=138 | −6 |
| T5 | (Australia) Adam Scott | 68-70=138 | −6 |
| T5 | (England) Brian Davis | 68-70=138 | −6 |
| T5 | (Scotland) Martin Laird | 65-73=138 | −6 |
| T5 | (South Korea) Charlie Wi | 71-67=138 | −6 |
| T10 | (United States) Blake Adams | 66-73=139 | −5 |
| T10 | (United States) Ben Curtis | 68-71=139 | −5 |
| T10 | (United States) Michael Thompson | 68-71=139 | −5 |
| T10 | (United States) Bill Haas | 68-71=139 | −5 |
| T10 | (United States) Kevin Stadler | 68-71=139 | −5 |

=== Third round ===
Saturday, May 12, 2012

| Place | Player | Score | To par |
|---|---|---|---|
| 1 | (United States) Kevin Na | 67-69-68=204 | −12 |
| 2 | (United States) Matt Kuchar | 68-68-69=205 | −11 |
| 3 | (United States) Rickie Fowler | 72-69-66=207 | −9 |
| T4 | (United States) Zach Johnson | 70-66-73=209 | −7 |
| T4 | (United States) Ben Curtis | 68-71-70=209 | −7 |
| T6 | (Venezuela) Jhonattan Vegas | 68-74-68=210 | −6 |
| T6 | (England) Brian Davis | 68-70-72=210 | −6 |
| T6 | (United States) Jonathan Byrd | 68-70-72=210 | −6 |
| T6 | (Scotland) Martin Laird | 65-73-72=210 | −6 |
| T10 | (United States) Johnson Wagner | 69-73-69=211 | −5 |
| T10 | (United States) Bo Van Pelt | 71-70-70=211 | −5 |
| T10 | (United States) Blake Adams | 66-73-72=211 | −5 |
| T10 | (South Korea) Charlie Wi | 71-67-73=211 | −5 |

=== Final round ===
Sunday, May 13, 2012

Champion
(c) = past champion

| Place | Player | Score | To par | Money ($) |
|---|---|---|---|---|
| 1 | (United States) Matt Kuchar | 68-68-69-70=275 | −13 | 1,710,000 |
| T2 | (United States) Ben Curtis | 68-71-70-68=277 | −11 | 627,000 |
| T2 | (United States) Rickie Fowler | 72-69-66-70=277 | −11 | 627,000 |
| T2 | (United States) Zach Johnson | 70-66-73-68=277 | −11 | 627,000 |
| T2 | (Scotland) Martin Laird | 65-73-72-67=277 | −11 | 627,000 |
| 6 | (England) Luke Donald | 72-69-72-66=279 | −9 | 342,000 |
| T7 | (United States) Kevin Na | 67-69-68-76=280 | −8 | 296,083 |
| T7 | (United States) Bo Van Pelt | 71-70-70-69=280 | −8 | 296,083 |
| T7 | (Venezuela) Jhonattan Vegas | 68-74-68-70=280 | −8 | 296,083 |
| T10 | (Sweden) Carl Pettersson | 71-72-69-69=281 | −7 | 247,000 |
| T10 | (United States) David Toms | 69-74-73-65=281 | −7 | 247,000 |

Leaderboard below the top 10
| Place | Player | Score | To par | Money ($) |
|---|---|---|---|---|
| T12 | (United States) Blake Adams | 66-73-72-71=282 | −6 | 199,500 |
| T12 | (United States) Jonathan Byrd | 68-70-72-72=282 | −6 | 199,500 |
| T12 | (Australia) Geoff Ogilvy | 70-73-70-69=282 | −6 | 199,500 |
| T15 | (Zimbabwe) Brendon de Jonge | 69-71-72-71=283 | −5 | 137,987 |
| T15 | (United States) Bob Estes | 73-69-76-65=283 | −5 | 137,987 |
| T15 | (Sweden) Peter Hanson | 73-71-71-68=283 | −5 | 137,987 |
| T15 | (Germany) Martin Kaymer | 73-69-70-71=283 | −5 | 137,987 |
| T15 | (United States) Spencer Levin | 74-68-72-69=283 | −5 | 137,987 |
| T15 | (United States) David Mathis | 72-71-69-71=283 | −5 | 137,987 |
| T15 | (Australia) Adam Scott (c) | 68-70-74-71=283 | −5 | 137,987 |
| T15 | (Sweden) Henrik Stenson (c) | 71-71-71-70=283 | −5 | 137,987 |
| T23 | (United States) Chris Couch | 72-71-71-70=284 | −4 | 95,000 |
| T23 | (United States) John Huh | 75-66-72-71=284 | −4 | 95,000 |
| T25 | (South Africa) Tim Clark (c) | 71-70-71-73=285 | −3 | 66,547 |
| T25 | (England) Brian Davis | 68-70-72-75=285 | −3 | 66,547 |
| T25 | (United States) Jim Furyk | 72-70-72-71=285 | −3 | 66,547 |
| T25 | (United States) Bill Haas | 68-71-74-72=285 | −3 | 66,547 |
| T25 | (United States) Phil Mickelson (c) | 71-71-70-73=285 | −3 | 66,547 |
| T25 | (United States) Pat Perez | 69-75-70-71=285 | −3 | 66,547 |
| T25 | (England) Ian Poulter | 65-76-71-73=285 | −3 | 66,547 |
| T25 | (United States) John Rollins | 72-72-69-72=285 | −3 | 66,547 |
| T25 | (United States) Kevin Stadler | 68-71-73-73=285 | −3 | 66,547 |
| T25 | (South Korea) Charlie Wi | 71-67-73-74=285 | −3 | 66,547 |
| T35 | (United States) Keegan Bradley | 72-70-74-70=286 | −2 | 46,835 |
| T35 | (United States) Tom Gillis | 70-71-73-72=286 | −2 | 46,835 |
| T35 | (United States) Jeff Maggert | 70-71-71-74=286 | −2 | 46,835 |
| T35 | (United States) Johnson Wagner | 69-73-69-75=286 | −2 | 46,835 |
| T35 | (United States) Jimmy Walker | 71-70-71-74=286 | −2 | 46,835 |
| T40 | (United States) Kris Blanks | 69-74-72-72=287 | −1 | 37,050 |
| T40 | (United States) J. J. Henry | 71-73-74-69=287 | −1 | 37,050 |
| T40 | (United States) Bryce Molder | 72-72-70-73=287 | −1 | 37,050 |
| T40 | (Spain) Álvaro Quirós | 72-72-72-71=287 | −1 | 37,050 |
| T40 | (United States) Tiger Woods (c) | 74-68-72-73=287 | −1 | 37,050 |
| 45 | (Australia) Marc Leishman | 73-70-73-72=288 | E | 31,350 |
| T46 | (United States) Ricky Barnes | 74-69-72-74=289 | +1 | 26,334 |
| T46 | (United States) Harrison Frazar | 68-76-69-76=289 | +1 | 26,334 |
| T46 | (United States) Brian Gay | 71-72-71-75=289 | +1 | 26,334 |
| T46 | (United States) Ryan Moore | 69-72-75-73=289 | +1 | 26,334 |
| T46 | (United States) Josh Teater | 71-71-76-71=289 | +1 | 26,334 |
| T51 | (United States) Brian Harman | 73-68-76-73=290 | +2 | 22,496 |
| T51 | (United States) Chris Kirk | 71-73-72-74=290 | +2 | 22,496 |
| T51 | (England) Justin Rose | 76-68-75-71=290 | +2 | 22,496 |
| T51 | (United States) Kevin Streelman | 72-68-72-78=290 | +2 | 22,496 |
| T51 | (United States) Michael Thompson | 68-71-75-76=290 | +2 | 22,496 |
| T56 | (Spain) Sergio García (c) | 73-71-68-79=291 | +3 | 21,280 |
| T56 | (South Africa) Trevor Immelman | 72-72-72-75=291 | +3 | 21,280 |
| T56 | (Sweden) Robert Karlsson | 70-74-76-71=291 | +3 | 21,280 |
| T56 | (Australia) Rod Pampling | 71-72-78-70=291 | +3 | 21,280 |
| T56 | (United States) Nick Watney | 71-70-76-74=291 | +3 | 21,280 |
| T61 | (Australia) Robert Allenby | 72-72-75-73=292 | +4 | 20,520 |
| T61 | (South Korea) Kang Sung-hoon | 75-68-72-77=292 | +4 | 20,520 |
| T61 | (England) Lee Westwood | 71-70-74-77=292 | +4 | 20,520 |
| T64 | (United States) Stewart Cink | 71-72-78-72=293 | +5 | 19,855 |
| T64 | (United States) Harris English | 70-67-79-77=293 | +5 | 19,855 |
| T64 | (United States) George McNeill | 70-73-82-68=293 | +5 | 19,855 |
| T64 | (United States) Heath Slocum | 73-70-78-72=293 | +5 | 19,855 |
| T68 | (United States) Jason Dufner | 73-71-76-75=295 | +7 | 19,285 |
| T68 | (Canada) David Hearn | 69-75-77-74=295 | +7 | 19,285 |
| T70 | (Canada) Graham DeLaet | 71-73-76-76=296 | +8 | 18,905 |
| T70 | (United States) Justin Leonard (c) | 75-68-74-79=296 | +8 | 18,905 |
| 72 | (United States) Cameron Tringale | 73-71-77-76=297 | +9 | 18,620 |
| CUT | (South Korea) Bae Sang-moon | 68-77=145 | +1 | |
| CUT | (United States) Ben Crane | 67-78=145 | +1 | |
| CUT | (Australia) Jason Day | 73-72=145 | +1 | |
| CUT | (Republic of Ireland) Pádraig Harrington | 69-76=145 | +1 | |
| CUT | (United States) Tim Herron | 70-75=145 | +1 | |
| CUT | (United States) Charles Howell III | 76-69=145 | +1 | |
| CUT | (Northern Ireland) Graeme McDowell | 74-71=145 | +1 | |
| CUT | (Italy) Francesco Molinari | 72-73=145 | +1 | |
| CUT | (United States) Joe Ogilvie | 72-73=145 | +1 | |
| CUT | (Australia) Nick O'Hern | 74-71=145 | +1 | |
| CUT | (South Africa) Louis Oosthuizen | 71-74=145 | +1 | |
| CUT | (United States) Ryan Palmer | 73-72=145 | +1 | |
| CUT | (Australia) John Senden | 74-71=145 | +1 | |
| CUT | (United States) Chris DiMarco | 73-73=146 | +2 | |
| CUT | (United States) Lucas Glover | 74-72=146 | +2 | |
| CUT | (United States) J. J. Killeen | 69-77=146 | +2 | |
| CUT | (United States) Davis Love III (c) | 72-74=146 | +2 | |
| CUT | (United States) Sean O'Hair | 69-77=146 | +2 | |
| CUT | (United States) Webb Simpson | 73-73=146 | +2 | |
| CUT | (United States) Kyle Stanley | 73-73=146 | +2 | |
| CUT | (Colombia) Camilo Villegas | 75-71=146 | +2 | |
| CUT | (India) Arjun Atwal | 69-78=147 | +3 | |
| CUT | (United States) Chad Campbell | 72-75=147 | +3 | |
| CUT | (United States) Ken Duke | 73-74=147 | +3 | |
| CUT | (United States) Tommy Gainey | 74-73=147 | +3 | |
| CUT | (United States) Brandt Jobe | 73-74=147 | +3 | |
| CUT | (United States) John Mallinger | 73-74=147 | +3 | |
| CUT | (United States) Jeff Overton | 78-69=147 | +3 | |
| CUT | (United States) Scott Piercy | 73-74=147 | +3 | |
| CUT | (United States) Chez Reavie | 72-75=147 | +3 | |
| CUT | (South Africa) Rory Sabbatini | 76-71=147 | +3 | |
| CUT | (Fiji) Vijay Singh | 73-74=147 | +3 | |
| CUT | (United States) Scott Stallings | 72-75=147 | +3 | |
| CUT | (United States) Chris Stroud | 73-74=147 | +3 | |
| CUT | (United States) Michael Bradley | 74-74=148 | +4 | |
| CUT | (Australia) Greg Chalmers | 72-76=148 | +4 | |
| CUT | (South Africa) Ernie Els | 74-74=148 | +4 | |
| CUT | (United States) Billy Mayfair | 79-69=148 | +4 | |
| CUT | (Northern Ireland) Rory McIlroy | 72-76=148 | +4 | |
| CUT | (United States) John Merrick | 70-78=148 | +4 | |
| CUT | (South Korea) Yang Yong-eun | 80-68=148 | +4 | |
| CUT | (South Africa) Retief Goosen | 72-77=149 | +5 | |
| CUT | (United States) Bud Cauley | 75-75=150 | +6 | |
| CUT | (United States) Charley Hoffman | 79-71=150 | +6 | |
| CUT | (Sweden) Freddie Jacobson | 71-79=150 | +6 | |
| CUT | (United States) Hunter Mahan | 74-76=150 | +6 | |
| CUT | (United States) Brandt Snedeker | 76-74=150 | +6 | |
| CUT | (United States) Steve Stricker | 76-74=150 | +6 | |
| CUT | (United States) Gary Woodland | 77-73=150 | +6 | |
| CUT | (South Korea) K. J. Choi (c) | 75-76=151 | +7 | |
| CUT | (United States) Matt Every | 77-74=151 | +7 | |
| CUT | (United States) Robert Garrigus | 73-78=151 | +7 | |
| CUT | (United States) Brendan Steele | 72-79=151 | +7 | |
| CUT | (United States) Mark Wilson | 74-77=151 | +7 | |
| CUT | (United States) Matt Bettencourt | 75-77=152 | +8 | |
| CUT | (United States) Kevin Chappell | 74-78=152 | +8 | |
| CUT | (United States) James Driscoll | 73-79=152 | +8 | |
| CUT | (United States) J. B. Holmes | 74-78=152 | +8 | |
| CUT | (Japan) Ryuji Imada | 75-77=152 | +8 | |
| CUT | (United States) Jerry Kelly | 82-72=154 | +10 | |
| CUT | (Australia) Aaron Baddeley | 78-77=155 | +11 | |
| CUT | (United States) Tom Pernice Jr. | 80-75=155 | +11 | |
| CUT | (United States) Troy Matteson | 79-77=156 | +12 | |
| CUT | (United States) Colt Knost | 79-78=157 | +13 | |
| CUT | (Argentina) Andrés Romero | 76-82=158 | +14 | |
| WD | (United States) Scott Verplank | 72 | E | |
| WD | (United States) Briny Baird | 76 | +4 | |
| WD | (England) Simon Dyson | 76 | +4 | |
| WD | (Argentina) Ángel Cabrera | 78 | +6 | |
| WD | (England) Paul Casey | | | |
| WD | (United States) Hunter Haas | | | |
| DQ | (United States) D. J. Trahan | 80 | +8 | |

==== Scorecard ====
Final round

| Hole | 1 | 2 | 3 | 4 | 5 | 6 | 7 | 8 | 9 | 10 | 11 | 12 | 13 | 14 | 15 | 16 | 17 | 18 |
|---|---|---|---|---|---|---|---|---|---|---|---|---|---|---|---|---|---|---|
| Par | 4 | 5 | 3 | 4 | 4 | 4 | 4 | 3 | 5 | 4 | 5 | 4 | 3 | 4 | 4 | 5 | 3 | 4 |
| (United States) Kuchar | −10 | −10 | −10 | −11 | −11 | −11 | −11 | −11 | −12 | −12 | −12 | −13 | −13 | −13 | −13 | −14 | −13 | −13 |
| (United States) Curtis | −7 | −7 | −6 | −7 | −7 | −7 | −8 | −6 | −7 | −8 | −9 | −10 | −10 | −10 | −9 | −10 | −10 | −11 |
| (United States) Fowler | −10 | −10 | −10 | −11 | −9 | −9 | −8 | −8 | −8 | −8 | −9 | −10 | −10 | −10 | −9 | −10 | −11 | −11 |
| (United States) Johnson | −7 | −9 | −8 | −9 | −9 | −9 | −9 | −9 | −9 | −9 | −10 | −10 | −10 | −11 | −10 | −11 | −11 | −11 |
| (Scotland) Laird | −6 | −7 | −7 | −7 | −7 | −7 | −8 | −8 | −9 | −9 | −10 | −11 | −12 | −11 | −11 | −12 | −12 | −11 |
| (United States) Na | −12 | −13 | −13 | −13 | −12 | −11 | −11 | −10 | −9 | −9 | −10 | −9 | −8 | −8 | −8 | −8 | −8 | −8 |

Cumulative tournament scores, relative to par

| Eagle | Birdie | Bogey | Double bogey |
