= 2014 WGC-HSBC Champions =

Coordinates: 31.109°N 121.216°E

Tournament information
- Dates: 6–9 November 2014
- Location: Shanghai, China
- Course(s): Sheshan Golf Club
- Tour(s): Asian Tour; European Tour; PGA Tour

Statistics
- Par: 72
- Length: 7,261 yards (6,639 m)
- Field: 80 players
- Cut: None
- Prize fund: $8,500,000 €6,825,000
- Winner's share: $1,400,000 €1,124,000

Champion
- (United States) Bubba Watson
- 277 (−11), playoff

Location in China

The 2014 WGC-HSBC Champions was a golf tournament played 6–9 November 2014 at the Sheshan Golf Club in Shanghai, China. It was the sixth WGC-HSBC Champions tournament, and the fourth of four World Golf Championships events held in the 2014 calendar year.

Bubba Watson won the tournament at the first playoff hole, holing a 20-foot (6 m) putt for a birdie at the 18th hole while Tim Clark took a par 5. Watson and Clark had tied for the lead at 277 after 72 holes. Watson seemed to have ruined his chance of winning by bogeying the 16th hole of the final round and taking a double bogey at the 17th. However he then holed out from a greenside bunker for an eagle at the last hole to take the lead. Clark then holed a 4-foot (1.2 m) putt for a birdie at the last to force a playoff. In the final group, Martin Kaymer, Graeme McDowell, and Hiroshi Iwata all needed a birdie at the last to join the playoff but none of the three made it.

== Field ==
The following is a list of players who qualified for the 2014 WGC-HSBC Champions. "Top rated" means tournaments with the highest "strength of field" rating (SOF) in the Official World Golf Ranking (these tournaments were pre-determined based on OWGR from 2012 to 2013 HSBC Champions). Players who qualify from multiple categories are listed in the first category in which they are eligible with the other qualifying categories in parentheses next to the player's name.

1. Winners of the four major championships and The Players Championship

Martin Kaymer (12), Bubba Watson (3,12)

- Qualified but did not play: Rory McIlroy (2,5,9,12)

2. Winners of the previous four World Golf Championships

Patrick Reed (12)

- Qualified but did not play: Jason Day (12), Dustin Johnson (12)

3. Winners of the top 20 rated PGA Tour events

Tim Clark, Matt Every, Russell Henley, J. B. Holmes, Billy Horschel (12), Matt Jones, Chris Kirk (12), Hunter Mahan (12), Hideki Matsuyama (12), Ryan Moore (12), Justin Rose (5,12), Adam Scott (9,12), John Senden, Kevin Stadler, Scott Stallings, Kevin Streelman (12)

- Qualified but did not play: Zach Johnson (12), Matt Kuchar (12)

4. Top 5 available players from the 2013–14 FedEx Cup points list

Rickie Fowler (12), Sergio García (5,10,12), Ryan Palmer (12), Jordan Spieth (12), Jimmy Walker (12)

- Qualified but did not play: Jim Furyk (12)

5. Winners of the top 10 rated European Tour events

Victor Dubuisson (12), Pablo Larrazábal, Graeme McDowell (12), Louis Oosthuizen, Marcel Siem, Henrik Stenson (12), Oliver Wilson

6. Top 15 available players from the Race to Dubai

Thomas Bjørn (8,12), Jonas Blixt, George Coetzee (8), Jamie Donaldson (12), Ernie Els (12), Tommy Fleetwood, Stephen Gallacher (12), Mikko Ilonen (12), Thongchai Jaidee (12), Miguel Ángel Jiménez (12), Alexander Lévy, Shane Lowry, Joost Luiten (12), Charl Schwartzel (8,12), Marc Warren

7. Four players - winners of the top 3 Japan Golf Tour events, remainder from 2014 Order of Merit

Luke Donald (12), Hiroshi Iwata (OoM), Kim Hyung-sung (OoM), Yoshitaka Takeya

- Qualified but did not play: Hiroyuki Fujita (OoM), Yuta Ikeda (OoM), Yūsaku Miyazato, Koumei Oda (OoM)

8. Four players - winners of the top 3 Sunshine Tour events, remainder from 2013 Order of Merit

Darren Fichardt (OoM), Hennie Otto (OoM), Dawie van der Walt (OoM), Jaco van Zyl (OoM)

9. Four players - winners of the top 3 PGA Tour of Australasia events, remainder from 2013 Order of Merit

Michael Hendry (OoM), Jin Jeong (OoM), Brody Ninyette (OoM), Thorbjørn Olesen

10. Six players - winners of the top 3 Asian Tour events, remainder from 2014 Order of Merit

Felipe Aguilar, Jason Knutzon (OoM), Anirban Lahiri (OoM), Antonio Lascuña (OoM), David Lipsky (OoM), Lee Westwood (12)

11. Six players from China

Dou Zecheng, Hu Mu, Li Haotong, Liang Wenchong, Wu Ashun, Zhang Lianwei

12. Any players, not included in above categories, in the top 50 of the OWGR on 20 October 2014

Keegan Bradley, Graham DeLaet, Jason Dufner, Bill Haas, Marc Leishman, Kevin Na, Ian Poulter, Brandt Snedeker, Brendon Todd, Gary Woodland

- Qualified but did not play: Phil Mickelson, Webb Simpson, Steve Stricker, Tiger Woods

13. Alternates, if needed to fill the field to 78 players

None needed: 80 players competed

- Winner of 21st ranked PGA Tour event
- Next ranked player, not otherwise exempt, from Race to Dubai as of 20 October, OWGR as of 20 October 2013–14 FedEx Cup list, repeating as necessary

== Round summaries ==
=== First round ===
Thursday, 6 November 2014

Graeme McDowell shot a 5-under-par 67 to take a two-stroke lead over six players, including 2011 champion Martin Kaymer. A strong wind, thick rough and narrow fairways made scoring difficult with only 27 players breaking par.

Place	Player	Score	To par
1	(Northern Ireland) Graeme McDowell	67	−5
T2	(South Africa) Tim Clark	69	−3
T2	(England) Tommy Fleetwood	69	−3
T2	(United States) Rickie Fowler	69	−3
T2	(Germany) Martin Kaymer	69	−3
T2	(United States) Chris Kirk	69	−3
T2	(United States) Brandt Snedeker	69	−3
T8	(United States) Bill Haas	70	−2
T8	(United States) J. B. Holmes	70	−2
T8	(South Korea) Kim Hyung-sung	70	−2
T8	(South Africa) Louis Oosthuizen	70	−2
T8	(England) Ian Poulter	70	−2
T8	(Australia) Adam Scott	70	−2
T8	(United States) Jordan Spieth	70	−2
T8	(Sweden) Henrik Stenson	70	−2
T8	(South Africa) Dawie van der Walt	70	−2
T8	(South Africa) Jaco van Zyl	70	−2
T8	(England) Lee Westwood	70	−2

=== Second round ===
Friday, 7 November 2014

Graeme McDowell shot a second straight round of 67 to take a three-stroke lead over Ian Poulter.

Place	Player	Score	To par
1	(Northern Ireland) Graeme McDowell	67-67=134	−10
2	(England) Ian Poulter	70-67=137	−7
T3	(Japan) Hiroshi Iwata	73-65=138	−6
T3	(United States) Bubba Watson	71-67=138	−6
T5	(Sweden) Jonas Blixt	71-68=139	−5
T5	(South Africa) Tim Clark	69-70=139	−5
T5	(United States) Rickie Fowler	69-70=139	−5
T5	(United States) Kevin Na	71-68=139	−5
T9	(Denmark) Thorbjørn Olesen	72-68=140	−4
T9	(South Africa) Louis Oosthuizen	70-70=140	−4

=== Third round ===
Saturday, 8 November 2014

Graeme McDowell maintained a one-stroke lead over Hiroshi Iwata. Martin Kaymer shot the low round of the day, 66, to climb to a third place tie with Bubba Watson.

Place	Player	Score	To par
1	(Northern Ireland) Graeme McDowell	67-67-71=205	−11
2	(Japan) Hiroshi Iwata	73-65-68=206	−10
T3	(Germany) Martin Kaymer	69-72-66=207	−9
T3	(United States) Bubba Watson	71-67-69=207	−9
T5	(South Africa) Tim Clark	69-70-69=208	−8
T5	(United States) Rickie Fowler	69-70-69=208	−8
T7	(Denmark) Thorbjørn Olesen	72-68-69=209	−7
T7	(England) Ian Poulter	70-67-72=209	−7
9	(Sweden) Jonas Blixt	71-68-71=210	−6
T10	(United States) Chris Kirk	69-74-69=212	−4
T10	(Australia) Marc Leishman	72-71-69=212	−4
T10	(South Africa) Louis Oosthuizen	70-70-72=212	−4
T10	(United States) Brandt Snedeker	69-74-69=212	−4
T10	(England) Lee Westwood	70-73-69=212	−4

=== Final round ===
Sunday, 9 November 2014

Bubba Watson and Tim Clark finished the round tied at 277 to force a playoff, with Watson scoring an eagle on the final hole. Watson made birdie on the first playoff hole to Clark's par to win the tournament, his first World Golf Championship. The leader from the first three rounds, Graeme McDowell, shot a 73 to fall into a tie for third.

Place	Player	Score	To par	Money (US$)
T1	(South Africa) Tim Clark	69-70-69-69=277	−11	Playoff
T1	(United States) Bubba Watson	71-67-69-70=277	−11	Playoff
T3	(United States) Rickie Fowler	69-70-69-70=278	−10	381,666
T3	(Japan) Hiroshi Iwata	73-65-68-72=278	−10	381,666
T3	(Northern Ireland) Graeme McDowell	67-67-71-73=278	−10	381,666
T6	(Germany) Martin Kaymer	69-72-66-73=280	−8	213,666
T6	(Denmark) Thorbjørn Olesen	72-68-69-71=280	−8	213,666
T6	(England) Ian Poulter	70-67-72-71=280	−8	213,666
9	(Australia) Marc Leishman	72-71-69-69=281	−7	158,000
T10	(United States) Jason Dufner	72-70-72-68=282	−6	135,500
T10	(United States) Brandt Snedeker	69-74-69-70=282	−6	135,500

==== Scorecard ====
Eagle	Birdie	Bogey	Double bogey

Hole	1	2	3	4	5	6	7	8	9	10	11	12	13	14	15	16	17	18
Par	4	5	4	3	4	3	4	5	4	4	4	3	4	5	4	4	3	5
(United States) Watson	−8	−9	−9	−10	−9	−10	−11	−12	−12	−12	−12	−12	−11	−12	−12	−11	−9	−11
(South Africa) Clark	−8	−9	−9	−8	−7	−6	−6	−7	−8	−8	−8	−8	−8	−9	−10	−10	−10	−11
(United States) Fowler	−7	−7	−8	−9	−9	−9	−9	−10	−9	−9	−9	−10	−10	−9	−9	−10	−10	−10
(Japan) Iwata	−10	−9	−9	−9	−9	−9	−9	−9	−8	−8	−9	−9	−10	−11	−10	−10	−10	−10
(Northern Ireland) McDowell	−11	−11	−11	−11	−11	−11	−10	−11	−11	−11	−11	−11	−11	−10	−10	−10	−10	−10

Cumulative tournament scores, relative to par

==== Playoff ====
Place	Player	Score	To par	Money ($)	
1	Bubba Watson	United States	4	−1	1,400,000
2	(South Africa) Tim Clark	5	E	850,000	

The sudden-death playoff started at the 18th hole.
