= 2018 WGC-Dell Technologies Match Play =

Tournament information
- Dates: March 21–25, 2018
- Location: Austin, Texas, U.S. 30.343°N 97.797°W
- Course: Austin Country Club
- Tours: PGA Tour; European Tour; Japan Golf Tour
- Format: Match play – 18 holes

Statistics
- Par: 71
- Length: 7,108 yards (6,500 m)
- Field: 64 players
- Prize fund: $10,000,000 €8,168,600
- Winner's share: $1,700,000 €1,388,662

Champion
- (United States) Bubba Watson
- def. Kevin Kisner 7 & 6

Location map
- Location in the United States Location in Texas

The 2018 WGC-Dell Technologies Match Play was the 20th WGC Match Play, played March 21–25 at Austin Country Club in Austin, Texas. It was the second of four World Golf Championships in 2018.

== Field ==
The field consisted of the top 64 players available from the Official World Golf Ranking on March 11. However, the seedings were based on the World Rankings on March 18.

Justin Rose (ranked 5th on March 12, personal reasons), Rickie Fowler (7th, personal reasons), Brooks Koepka (8th, wrist injury), Henrik Stenson (15th, personal reasons), Adam Scott (56th, personal reasons), and Joost Luiten (67th, wrist injury) did not compete, allowing entry for Kevin Na (ranked 65th), Charles Howell III (66th), Keegan Bradley (68th), Luke List (69th), and Julian Suri (70th).

== Format ==
In 2014 and earlier editions, the championship was a single elimination match play event. A new format was introduced in 2015, and the championship now starts with pool play, with 16 groups of four players playing round-robin matches, on Wednesday through Friday. The top 16 seeded players are allocated to the 16 groups, one in each group. The remaining 48 players are placed into three pools (seeds 17–32, seeds 33–48, seeds 49–64). Each group has one player randomly selected from each pool to complete the group.

All group play matches are limited to 18 holes with one point awarded for a win and one-half point for a halved match. Only one player advances to the weekend from each of the 16 groupings. After all 3 rounds are played, if 2 or more players are tied for first place in their group, then they play a sudden-death stroke play playoff, beginning on hole 1 and moving beyond if necessary.

The winners of each group advance to a single-elimination bracket on the weekend, with the round of 16 and quarterfinals on Saturday, and the semi-finals, finals, and consolation match on Sunday.

Pool A – Top 16 seeds
Seed	Rank	Player
1	1	(United States) Dustin Johnson
2	2	(United States) Justin Thomas
3	3	(Spain) Jon Rahm
4	4	(United States) Jordan Spieth
5	6	(Japan) Hideki Matsuyama
6	7	(Northern Ireland) Rory McIlroy
7	10	(Spain) Sergio García
8	11	(Australia) Jason Day
9	12	(England) Tommy Fleetwood
10	13	(England) Paul Casey
11	15	(Australia) Marc Leishman
12	16	(England) Tyrrell Hatton
13	17	(Sweden) Alex Norén
14	18	(United States) Phil Mickelson
15	19	(United States) Pat Perez
16	20	(United States) Matt Kuchar

Pool B
Seed	Rank	Player
17	21	(Spain) Rafa Cabrera-Bello
18	22	(United States) Brian Harman
19	23	(United States) Patrick Reed
20	24	(United States) Xander Schauffele
21	25	(Italy) Francesco Molinari
22	26	(United States) Charley Hoffman
23	27	(South Africa) Branden Grace
24	28	(United States) Gary Woodland
25	29	(South Africa) Louis Oosthuizen
26	30	(United States) Daniel Berger
27	31	(England) Ross Fisher
28	32	(Thailand) Kiradech Aphibarnrat
29	33	(United States) Tony Finau
30	34	(United States) Patrick Cantlay
31	35	(England) Matt Fitzpatrick
32	36	(United States) Kevin Kisner

Pool C
Seed	Rank	Player
33	37	(United States) Kevin Chappell
34	38	(China) Li Haotong
35	39	(United States) Bubba Watson
36	40	(United States) Brendan Steele
37	41	(United States) Webb Simpson
38	42	(Canada) Adam Hadwin
39	43	(Belgium) Thomas Pieters
40	44	(Japan) Satoshi Kodaira
41	45	(South Africa) Dylan Frittelli
42	45	(United States) Jason Dufner
43	47	(United States) Chez Reavie
44	48	(Venezuela) Jhonattan Vegas
45	49	(United States) Kyle Stanley
46	50	(Australia) Cameron Smith
47	51	(Japan) Yuta Ikeda
48	52	(United States) Patton Kizzire

Pool D
Seed	Rank	Player
49	53	(South Africa) Charl Schwartzel
50	54	(South Korea) Kim Si-woo
51	55	(United States) Russell Henley
52	56	(Austria) Bernd Wiesberger
53	57	(Japan) Yūsaku Miyazato
54	58	(United States) Zach Johnson
55	60	(France) Alexander Lévy
56	62	(United States) James Hahn
57	63	(United States) Peter Uihlein
58	64	(England) Ian Poulter
59	65	(United States) Charles Howell III
60	67	(United States) Luke List
61	68	(United States) Kevin Na
62	69	(India) Shubhankar Sharma
63	70	(United States) Keegan Bradley
64	72	(United States) Julian Suri

Rank – Official World Golf Ranking on March 19, 2018.

== Results ==
=== Pool play ===
Players were divided into 16 groups of four players and played round-robin matches Wednesday to Friday.

- Round 1 – March 21
- Round 2 – March 22
- Round 3 – March 23

Group 1
Round	Winner	Score	Loser
1	Wiesberger	3 & 1	D. Johnson
1	Kisner vs Hadwin – halved		
2	Hadwin	4 & 3	D. Johnson
2	Kisner	5 & 4	Wiesberger
3	Kisner	4 & 3	D. Johnson
3	Hadwin vs Wiesberger – halved		

Seed	Player	W	L	H	Points	Finish
32	(United States) Kevin Kisner	2	0	1	2.5	1
38	(Canada) Adam Hadwin	1	0	2	2	2
52	(Austria) Bernd Wiesberger	1	1	1	1.5	3
1	(United States) Dustin Johnson	0	3	0	0	4

Group 2
Round	Winner	Score	Loser
1	Thomas	2 up	List
1	Molinari	3 & 1	Kizzire
2	Thomas	3 & 1	Kizzire
2	Molinari	3 & 2	List
3	Thomas	7 & 5	Molinari
3	Kizzire	4 & 2	List

Seed	Player	W	L	H	Points	Finish
2	(United States) Justin Thomas	3	0	0	3	1
21	(Italy) Francesco Molinari	2	1	0	2	2
48	(United States) Patton Kizzire	1	2	0	1	3
60	(United States) Luke List	0	3	0	0	4

Group 3
Round	Winner	Score	Loser
1	Rahm vs Bradley – halved		
1	Aphibarnrat	3 & 2	Reavie
2	Reavie	1 up	Rahm
2	Aphibarnrat	1 up	Bradley
3	Aphibarnrat	4 & 3	Rahm
3	Reavie vs Bradley – halved		

Seed	Player	W	L	H	Points	Finish
28	(Thailand) Kiradech Aphibarnrat	3	0	0	3	1
43	(United States) Chez Reavie	1	1	1	1.5	2
63	(United States) Keegan Bradley	0	1	2	1	3
3	(Spain) Jon Rahm	0	2	1	0.5	4

Group 4
Round	Winner	Score	Loser
1	Spieth	2 & 1	Schwartzel
1	Reed	3 & 2	Li
2	Spieth	4 & 2	Li
2	Reed	2 up	Schwartzel
3	Reed	2 & 1	Spieth
3	Schwartzel	3 & 2	Li

Seed	Player	W	L	H	Points	Finish
19	(United States) Patrick Reed	3	0	0	3	1
4	(United States) Jordan Spieth	2	1	0	2	2
49	(South Africa) Charl Schwartzel	1	2	0	1	3
34	(China) Li Haotong	0	3	0	0	4

Group 5
Round	Winner	Score	Loser
1	Matsuyama	2 & 1	Miyazato
1	Smith	2 up	Cantlay
2	Smith	1 up	Matsuyama
2	Cantlay	1 up	Miyazato
3	Cantlay	4 & 3	Matsuyama
3	Smith vs Miyazato – halved		

Seed	Player	W	L	H	Points	Finish
46	(Australia) Cameron Smith	2	0	1	2.5	1
30	(United States) Patrick Cantlay	2	1	0	2	2
5	(Japan) Hideki Matsuyama	1	2	0	1	3
53	(Japan) Yūsaku Miyazato	0	2	1	0.5	4

Group 6
Round	Winner	Score	Loser
1	Uihlein	2 & 1	McIlroy
1	Harman vs Vegas – halved		
2	McIlroy	2 & 1	Vegas
2	Harman	3 & 2	Uihlein
3	Harman	5 & 3	McIlroy
3	Uihlein	4 & 3	Vegas

Seed	Player	W	L	H	Points	Finish
18	(United States) Brian Harman	2	0	1	2.5	1
57	(United States) Peter Uihlein	2	1	0	2	2
6	(Northern Ireland) Rory McIlroy	1	2	0	1	3
44	(Venezuela) Jhonattan Vegas	0	2	1	0.5	4

Group 7
Round	Winner	Score	Loser
1	García	1 up	Sharma
1	Schauffele	1 up	Frittelli
2	García	2 up	Frittelli
2	Schauffele	2 & 1	Sharma
3	García	3 & 1	Schauffele
3	Frittelli	1 up	Sharma

Seed	Player	W	L	H	Points	Finish
7	(Spain) Sergio García	3	0	0	3	1
20	(United States) Xander Schauffele	2	1	0	2	2
41	(South Africa) Dylan Frittelli	1	2	0	1	3
62	(India) Shubhankar Sharma	0	3	0	0	4

Group 8
Round	Winner	Score	Loser
1	Day	4 & 2	Hahn
1	Oosthuizen	1 up	Dufner
2	Dufner	3 & 1	Day
2	Hahn	3 & 1	Oosthuizen
3	Oosthuizen	2 up	Day
3	Dufner	3 & 2	Hahn

Seed	Player	W	L	H	Points	Finish
25	(South Africa) Louis Oosthuizen	2	1	0	2	1
42	(United States) Jason Dufner	2	1	0	2	2
8	(Australia) Jason Day	1	2	0	1	T3
56	(United States) James Hahn	1	2	0	1	T3

- Oosthuizen advanced in sudden-death playoff over Dufner – 1 hole

Group 9
Round	Winner	Score	Loser
1	Poulter	3 & 2	Fleetwood
1	Chappell	3 & 2	Berger
2	Fleetwood	7 & 6	Chappell
2	Poulter	2 & 1	Berger
3	Fleetwood	2 & 1	Berger
3	Poulter	con	Chappell

Seed	Player	W	L	H	Points	Finish
58	(England) Ian Poulter	3	0	0	3	1
9	(England) Tommy Fleetwood	2	1	0	2	2
33	(United States) Kevin Chappell	1	2	0	1	3
26	(United States) Daniel Berger	0	3	0	0	4

- Chappell conceded his match with Poulter after 9 holes
  (Poulter 3 up) and withdrew from the tournament.

Group 10
Round	Winner	Score	Loser
1	Casey	1 up	Henley
1	Stanley	1 up	Fitzpatrick
2	Casey	3 & 2	Stanley
2	Henley	2 & 1	Fitzpatrick
3	Fitzpatrick	3 & 2	Casey
3	Stanley	1 up	Henley

Seed	Player	W	L	H	Points	Finish
45	(United States) Kyle Stanley	2	1	0	2	1
10	(England) Paul Casey	2	1	0	2	2
51	(United States) Russell Henley	1	2	0	1	T3
31	(England) Matt Fitzpatrick	1	2	0	1	T3

- Stanley advanced in a sudden-death playoff vs Casey
  winning with birdie on the 2nd hole.

Group 11
Round	Winner	Score	Loser
1	Suri	3 & 2	Leishman
1	Watson	5 & 3	Grace
2	Watson	3 & 2	Leishman
2	Grace	2 & 1	Suri
3	Leishman vs Grace – halved		
3	Watson vs Suri – halved		

Seed	Player	W	L	H	Points	Finish
35	(United States) Bubba Watson	2	0	1	2.5	1
23	(South Africa) Branden Grace	1	1	1	1.5	T2
64	(United States) Julian Suri	1	1	1	1.5	T2
11	(Australia) Marc Leishman	0	2	1	0.5	4

Group 12
Round	Winner	Score	Loser
1	Hatton	3 & 2	Lévy
1	Steele	1 up	Hoffman
2	Hatton	3 & 2	Steele
2	Lévy	1 up	Hoffman
3	Hoffman	3 & 2	Hatton
3	Steele	3 & 1	Lévy

Seed	Player	W	L	H	Points	Finish
12	(England) Tyrrell Hatton	2	1	0	2	1
36	(United States) Brendan Steele	2	1	0	2	2
55	(France) Alexander Lévy	1	2	0	1	T3
22	(United States) Charley Hoffman	1	2	0	1	T3

- Hatton advanced in sudden-death playoff over Steele – 1 hole

Group 13
Round	Winner	Score	Loser
1	Norén	4 & 2	Na
1	Finau	2 & 1	Pieters
2	Norén	5 & 4	Pieters
2	Finau	3 & 2	Na
3	Norén	1 up	Finau
3	Pieters vs Na – halved		

Seed	Player	W	L	H	Points	Finish
13	(Sweden) Alex Norén	3	0	0	3	1
29	(United States) Tony Finau	2	1	0	2	2
39	(Belgium) Thomas Pieters	0	2	1	0.5	T3
61	(United States) Kevin Na	0	2	1	0.5	T3

Group 14
Round	Winner	Score	Loser
1	Howell III	3 & 2	Mickelson
1	Cabrera-Bello	2 & 1	Kodaira
2	Mickelson	1 up	Kodaira
2	Howell III	3 & 1	Cabrera-Bello
3	Mickelson	1 up	Cabrera-Bello
3	Howell III	2 & 1	Kodaira

Seed	Player	W	L	H	Points	Finish
59	(United States) Charles Howell III	3	0	0	3	1
14	(United States) Phil Mickelson	2	1	0	2	2
17	(Spain) Rafa Cabrera-Bello	1	2	0	1	3
40	(Japan) Satoshi Kodaira	0	3	0	0	4

Group 15
Round	Winner	Score	Loser
1	Perez vs Kim – halved		
1	Woodland vs Simpson – halved		
2	Simpson	2 & 1	Perez
2	Kim	5 & 3	Woodland
3	Woodland	1 up	Perez
3	Kim	2 up	Simpson

Seed	Player	W	L	H	Points	Finish
50	(South Korea) Kim Si-woo	2	0	1	2.5	1
24	(United States) Gary Woodland	1	1	1	1.5	T2
37	(United States) Webb Simpson	1	1	1	1.5	T2
15	(United States) Pat Perez	0	2	1	0.5	4

Group 16
Round	Winner	Score	Loser
1	Kuchar vs Z. Johnson – halved		
1	Ikeda	2 & 1	Fisher
2	Kuchar	1 up	Ikeda
2	Fisher	2 up	Z. Johnson
3	Kuchar	6 & 4	Fisher
3	Ikeda vs Z. Johnson – halved		

Seed	Player	W	L	H	Points	Finish
16	(United States) Matt Kuchar	2	0	1	2.5	1
47	(Japan) Yuta Ikeda	1	1	1	1.5	2
27	(England) Ross Fisher	1	2	0	1	T3
54	(United States) Zach Johnson	0	1	2	1	T3

=== Final 16 bracket ===
First round March 24 – morning
32	(United States) Kevin Kisner	1 up
16	(United States) Matt Kuchar
25	(South Africa) Louis Oosthuizen
58	(England) Ian Poulter	2&1
19	(United States) Patrick Reed
13	(Sweden) Alex Norén	5&3
46	(Australia) Cameron Smith	2&1
12	(England) Tyrrell Hatton
2	(United States) Justin Thomas	6&5
50	(South Korea) Kim Si-woo
7	(Spain) Sergio García
45	(United States) Kyle Stanley	3&1
28	(Thailand) Kiradech Aphibarnrat	1 up
59	(United States) Charles Howell III
18	(United States) Brian Harman
35	(United States) Bubba Watson	2&1

Quarter-finals; March 24 – afternoon
32	(United States) Kevin Kisner	8&6
58	(England) Ian Poulter
13	(Sweden) Alex Norén	4&2
46	(Australia) Cameron Smith
2	(United States) Justin Thomas	2&1
45	(United States) Kyle Stanley
28	(Thailand) Kiradech Aphibarnrat
35	(United States) Bubba Watson	5&3

Semi-finals; March 25 – morning
32	(United States) Kevin Kisner	19 h
13	(Sweden) Alex Norén
2	(United States) Justin Thomas
35	(United States) Bubba Watson	3&2

Final; March 25 – afternoon
32	(United States) Kevin Kisner
35	(United States) Bubba Watson	7&6
Third place
13	(Sweden) Alex Norén	5&3
2	(United States) Justin Thomas

== Prize money breakdown ==
Place	Description	US ($)
1	Champion	1,700,000
2	Runner-up	1,072,000
3	Third place	695,000
4	Fourth place	559,000
T5	Losing quarter-finalists x 4	306,000
T9	Losing round of 16 x 8	163,000
T17	Those with 2 points in pool play x 12	97,917
T29	Those with 1.5 points in pool play x 7	77,429
T36	Those with 1 point in pool play x 16	65,500
T52	Those with 0.5 points in pool play x 7	54,214
T59	Those with 0 points in pool play x 6	50,250
	Total	10,000,000
