= Matt Kuchar =

American professional golfer (born 1978)

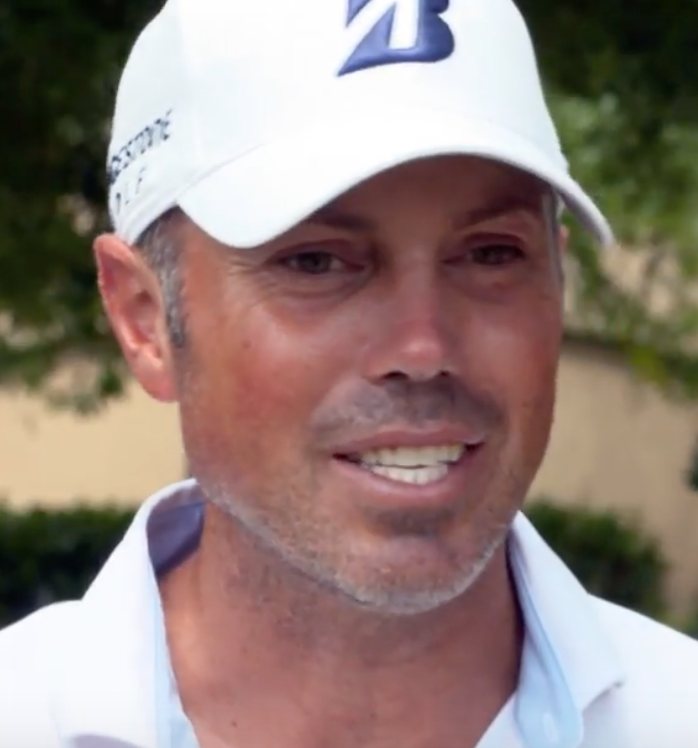
- Kuchar at the 2017 Valero Texas Open

Personal information
- Full name: Matthew Gregory Kuchar
- Nickname: Kuch
- Nationality: United States
- Born: June 21, 1978 (age 48) Winter Park, Florida, U.S.
- Height: 6 ft 4 in (1.93 m)
- Weight: 195 lb (88 kg; 13.9 st)
- Spouse: Sybi Parker (m. 2003)
- Children: 2

Career
- Sport: Golf
- College: Georgia Tech
- Turned professional: 2000
- Current tour: PGA Tour
- Professional wins: 19
- Highest ranking: 4 (June 2, 2013)

Number of wins by tour
- PGA Tour: 9
- European Tour: 1
- Japan Golf Tour: 1
- Asian Tour: 1
- PGA Tour of Australasia: 1
- Korn Ferry Tour: 1
- Other: 7

Best results in major championships
- Masters Tournament: T3: 2012
- PGA Championship: T7: 2015
- U.S. Open: T6: 2010
- The Open Championship: 2nd: 2017

Achievements and awards
- Haskins Award: 1998
- PGA Tour money list winner: 2010
- Byron Nelson Award: 2010
- Vardon Trophy: 2010
Medal record
Men's golf
Representing United States
Olympic Games
Bronze medal – third place	2016 Rio de Janeiro	Individual

Matthew Gregory Kuchar (born June 21, 1978) is an American professional golfer who plays on the PGA Tour and formerly the Nationwide Tour. He has won nine times on the PGA Tour. Kuchar briefly enjoyed success in the early 2000s before suffering a slump where he struggled to maintain his playing status on the PGA Tour. He rejuvenated himself and built a new, one-plane swing from 2008 onward leading to improved results. Kuchar was the PGA Tour's leading money winner in 2010.

Kuchar won The Players Championship in 2012, the flagship event of the PGA Tour, his biggest tournament victory to date. As a result, he moved to a career high number five in the world rankings and has spent over 40 weeks ranked inside its top-10. In February 2013, Kuchar won his first World Golf Championship event, defeating Hunter Mahan in the final of the WGC-Accenture Match Play Championship.

At the 2016 Summer Olympics in Rio de Janeiro, Kuchar won the first Olympic bronze medal awarded for golf since the 1904 Summer Olympics. Kuchar ended the 2025 season as the highest-earning PGA Tour player without a major championship win, with career earnings of over $61.5 million. The closest he has come was his second-place finish in the 2017 Open Championship at Royal Birkdale Golf Club.

== Early life ==
Kuchar was born in Winter Park, Florida, to Peter, a life insurance salesman and college tennis pro, and Meg Kuchar, with one sibling, Rebecca. He went on to graduate from Seminole High School in Sanford in 1996.

== Amateur career ==
Kuchar attended Georgia Tech in Atlanta, where he was a two-time first-team All-American on the Yellow Jackets' golf team. After narrowly losing in the semi-finals of the 1996 U.S. Amateur championship to Tiger Woods, Kuchar won the title in 1997. He received the Haskins Award in 1998 as the nation's top collegiate golfer. One of Kuchar's teammates at Georgia Tech was future PGA Tour professional Bryce Molder. He earned his bachelor's degree in management.

In addition, he had some success at major championships in 1998. He was the low amateur at both The Masters and U.S. Open.

== Professional career ==
=== Early career ===
Kuchar turned professional in November 2000, after working briefly for a financial services firm. He missed the sign-up deadline for the 2000 qualifying school. In 2001 he was given sponsors' exemptions to some PGA Tour tournaments, and earned enough money to be fully exempt for the 2002 season.

Kuchar's first win on the PGA Tour came at the Honda Classic in 2002. A tough year in 2005 saw him win under $403,000, 159th on the money list, which caused a loss of his tour card. He failed to regain it at qualifying school and played on the Nationwide Tour in 2006. Kuchar won its Henrico County Open and finished tenth on the Nationwide Tour money list to earn back his PGA Tour card for 2007. He retained his card for the next two seasons by finishing 115th on the money list in 2007 and 70th in 2008.

=== 2009 ===
Seven years after his first PGA Tour win, Kuchar won for a second time during the Fall Series in 2009 at the Turning Stone Resort Championship. He prevailed in a playoff over Vaughn Taylor that concluded on Monday due to darkness on Sunday evening.

=== 2010 ===
Kuchar made the Ryder Cup team in 2010, taking the eighth and last merit position on the 12-man U.S. squad on August 15. At the time, Kuchar led the PGA Tour in top-10 finishes for the year, but had not won a tournament in 2010. The winless streak ended two weeks later at The Barclays on August 29, which was played at the Ridgewood Country Club in Paramus, New Jersey; Kuchar defeated Martin Laird on the first hole of a sudden-death playoff. Kuchar won the Vardon Trophy and Byron Nelson Award in 2010 for lowest scoring average and the PGA Tour's Arnold Palmer Award for leading the money list.

=== 2011 ===
Kuchar started off 2011 well with three consecutive top-10 finishes in the first three weeks of the season. He finished T6 at the opening PGA Tour event, the Hyundai Tournament of Champions on Maui. The following week at the Sony Open in Hawaii, he played his way to a T5 finish and then at the Bob Hope Classic achieved a T7 finish.

In February, Kuchar reached the semi-finals of the WGC-Accenture Match Play Championship, where he suffered a 6&5 defeat by eventual champion Luke Donald. In the 3rd place playoff match, he defeated fellow American Bubba Watson, 2&1. Previously during the week Kuchar had beaten Anders Hansen on the 22nd hole in round one, Bo Van Pelt in round two, Rickie Fowler in round three and Yang Yong-eun at the quarter-final stage.

Kuchar finished tied for second at the Memorial Tournament at Muirfield Village in June 2011 behind Steve Stricker. This was his eighth top-10 finish of the season and took him to his highest ranking to date of world number six. Kuchar finished second at The Barclays, two strokes behind the winner, Dustin Johnson. The tournament was shortened to 54 holes due to Hurricane Irene. This finish moved him to second in the FedEx Cup standings. Kuchar and Gary Woodland combined to win the Omega Mission Hills World Cup in November.

=== 2012 ===
Kuchar had his best performance in a major championship at The Masters when he finished in a tie for third. Kuchar was tied for the lead on the back nine on Sunday, but bogeyed the par three 16th and finished two strokes out of the playoff between Bubba Watson and Louis Oosthuizen.

Kuchar won the biggest tournament of his career in May when he won The Players Championship at TPC Sawgrass in Ponte Vedra Beach, Florida. He shot a final round of 70 (−2) to win by two strokes over runners-up Rickie Fowler, Martin Laird, Ben Curtis, and Zach Johnson. He entered the final round in the last group, one stroke behind Kevin Na. After bogeying the first hole, he played a near-perfect round, except for a three-putt bogey on the 17th, to hold off the challengers. The win elevated Kuchar to a career high of number five in the world rankings.

=== 2013 ===
He won the WGC-Accenture Match Play Championship in February, defeating Hunter Mahan 2&1 in the final. During the final, Kuchar built up an early lead and was 4 up at the turn. Mahan mounted a comeback on the back nine, winning four of the next seven holes to trail by just one with two to play. Mahan's wild drive on the par-4 17th put him in trouble, and after Kuchar knocked his approach close, Mahan failed to chip in for par and conceded the hole, which ended the match and gave Kuchar his first World Golf Championship title. Throughout the week, Kuchar was never more than one down in any of his matches and only trailed three times on his way to the win. He defeated Hiroyuki Fujita, Sergio García, Nicolas Colsaerts, Robert Garrigus and Jason Day en route to the final. Kuchar moved back into the world's top 10 after this victory. His second win in 2013 came at the Memorial Tournament in early June.

Late in the year Kuchar played in two events in Australia. He finished runner-up to Adam Scott at the Australian Masters and finished fourth in the 2013 World Cup of Golf.

=== 2014 ===
In the final round of the Valero Texas Open in March, Kuchar held a share of the lead with nine holes to play but bogeyed the 10th and 11th holes and finished T-4. The next week, he had a four-stroke lead going into the final round at the Shell Houston Open but lost a playoff to Matt Jones' 42-yard chip-in on the first extra hole. Kuchar was again in contention the following week at the Masters Tournament, where he was tied for the lead on Sunday before four-putting the fourth hole and finishing T-5.

A week later, Kuchar won for the seventh time on the PGA Tour with a one stroke victory at the RBC Heritage. He shot a final-round 64, which included a chip-in birdie from a greenside bunker on the 18th hole to come from four shots behind and claim victory.

=== 2015 ===
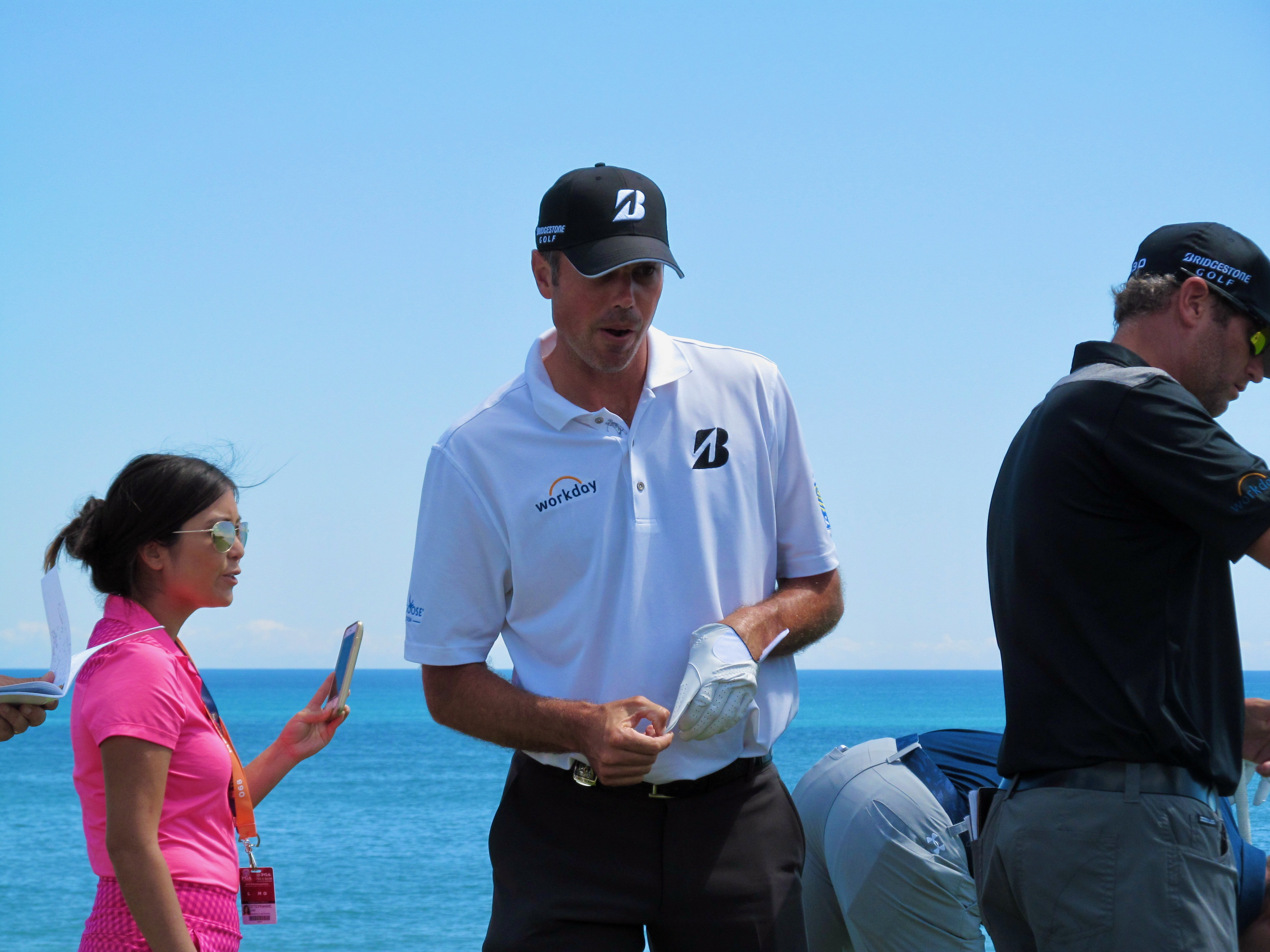
Kuchar at the 2015 PGA Championship

At the Sony Open in Hawaii in January, Kuchar opened with 65–63 to lead after two rounds. He stalled on the weekend, however, to finish tied for third. In the final round Kuchar failed to make a birdie, snapping his streak of 255 rounds on the PGA Tour with at least one birdie. The following week Kuchar tied for second, one stroke behind the winner, at the Humana Challenge.

In April, Kuchar contended at the RBC Heritage and finished in fifth place. His best performance in the season's majors came in August at the PGA Championship at Whistling Straits in Wisconsin where he finished tied for seventh. Kuchar played in only two official events outside of the PGA Tour in 2015 but did very well in both. He finished one stroke back to fellow American Rickie Fowler at the Scottish Open and won the Fiji International, an official event on the PGA Tour of Australasia. Kuchar had seven top-tens for the season but did not win a PGA Tour tournament for the first time in four years. He finished well down the money list after finishing in the top 10 in earnings in four of the preceding five seasons.

=== 2016 ===
Kuchar had 9 top-10s heading into the 2016 Summer Olympics, and continued his good run with a bronze medal after a final round 63.

=== 2017 ===
In the 2017 season, Kuchar competed in 26 events on the PGA Tour, making the cut in 22, including nine top-10 finishes. He finished tied for fourth at the Masters, his fourth top-10 finish in that event. At the Open Championship, Kuchar shared the first-round lead with Brooks Koepka and Jordan Spieth and finished rounds two and three in solo second behind Spieth. After Spieth's near meltdown on the 13th hole of the final round, Kuchar held a one-stroke lead with five holes to play. However, Spieth played the last five holes in five-under-par to claim the championship by three strokes over Kuchar, who finished three strokes ahead of third-place finisher Li Haotong. Kuchar finished the year 14th in the FedEx Cup standings and represented the United States in the President's Cup, posting a 2–1 record in the United States' win.

=== 2018 ===
In the 2017–18 PGA Tour season, Kuchar had another winless campaign. He played in 24 events. He had four top-10 finishes and made 20 cuts. He won $1,720,097 for the year and finished 76th in the season long FedEx Cup.

U.S. Ryder Cup captain Jim Furyk named Kuchar as a non-playing vice-captain for the U.S. team in the 2018 Ryder Cup. The U.S. team lost to the European team 17 1/2 to 10 1/2 at Le Golf National outside of Paris, France.

On November 11, 2018, Kuchar won the Mayakoba Golf Classic in Cancun, Mexico. This event was part of the 2018–19 PGA Tour season. Kuchar took home a winner's check of $1.296 million and paid his caddie, David Giral Ortiz, the amount they agreed to for a top ten finish ($4,000) and an additional $1,000 on top of that to equal $5,000, which is a 0.38 percent tip of the $1.296 million, causing a social media controversy. Kuchar offered an additional $15,000 payment to Ortiz, which would have amounted to a total of $20,000 or 1.54 percent of the winner's check. This amount is below the average payout (10 percent) for a full-time caddie whose player wins. Because Kuchar's regular caddie was not available, Ortiz was hired and agreed to the terms presented. Ortiz has stated to Golf.com that he never expected the full 10 percent payout and that "Matt is a good person and a great player. He treated me very well. I am only disappointed by how it all finished." When asked about giving his caddie such a low tip, Kuchar defended his decision by stating, "For a guy who makes 200 a day, a 5000 dollar week is a really big week". On February 15, 2019, Kuchar apologized and agreed to pay Ortiz the requested $50,000 and also donate an unspecified amount to local Cancun charities.

At the end of the 2018–19 PGA Tour regular season, Rory McIlroy jokingly roasted Matt Kuchar over the caddie pay controversy. At the initial award ceremony of the Wyndham Rewards Top 10, which awarded a $10 million bonus pool to the top 10 players in the final regular season FedEx Cup standings, after Kuchar playfully joked about McIlroy's narrow 2-point margin for an extra $300,000, McIlroy highlighted that "And we all know what money means to him."

=== 2019 ===
On January 13, 2019, Kuchar won the Sony Open in Hawaii, his second win in three starts. On March 31, 2019, Kuchar reached the championship round of the WGC-Dell Technologies Match Play for the second time in his career, having previously done so in 2013 when he went on to win the title. He lost to Kevin Kisner, 3 & 2, in the final. In December 2019, Kuchar played on the U.S. team at the 2019 Presidents Cup at Royal Melbourne Golf Club in Australia. The U.S. team won 16–14. Kuchar went 0–1–3, but battled back from 3 down against Louis Oosthuizen to halve the match in Sunday singles. Kuchar made the Cup-clinching putt on 17.

=== 2020 ===
On January 19, 2020, Kuchar won the Singapore Open on the Japan Golf Tour. The tournament was co-sanctioned by the Asian Tour.

=== 2025 ===
After retaining full PGA Tour status for eighteen years, Kuchar ended the 2025 season 118th in the FedEx Cup standings, which earns him conditional status for 2026. Kuchar also had the option of using one of two career earnings exemptions (top 25 and top 50 in all-time earnings), which he opted not to use for the year. He said that the earnings exemption would likely get him three or four more starts and none of the signature events.

== Personal life ==
Kuchar is married to Sybi Parker, who was a tennis player at Georgia Tech, and they live on St. Simons Island in Georgia. Their two sons are Cameron Cole and Carson Wright. Kuchar is a Christian.

== Amateur wins ==
- 1997 Terra Cotta Invitational, U.S. Amateur

== Professional wins (19) ==
=== PGA Tour wins (9) ===
Legend
Players Championships (1)
World Golf Championships (1)
FedEx Cup playoff events (1)
Other PGA Tour (6)

No.	Date	Tournament	Winning score	To par	Margin of victory	Runner(s)-up
1	Mar 10, 2002	The Honda Classic	68-69-66-66=269	−19	2 strokes	(United States) Brad Faxon, (United States) Joey Sindelar
2	Oct 5, 2009	Turning Stone Resort Championship	67-68-67-69=271	−17	Playoff	(United States) Vaughn Taylor
3	Aug 29, 2010	The Barclays	68-69-69-66=272	−12	Playoff	(Scotland) Martin Laird
4	May 13, 2012	The Players Championship	68-68-69-70=275	−13	2 strokes	(United States) Ben Curtis, (United States) Rickie Fowler, (United States) Zach Johnson, (Scotland) Martin Laird
5	Feb 24, 2013	WGC-Accenture Match Play Championship	2 and 1			(United States) Hunter Mahan
6	Jun 2, 2013	Memorial Tournament	68-70-70-68=276	−12	2 strokes	(United States) Kevin Chappell
7	Apr 20, 2014	RBC Heritage	66-73-70-64=273	−11	1 stroke	(England) Luke Donald
8	Nov 11, 2018	Mayakoba Golf Classic	64-64-65-69=262	−22	1 stroke	(New Zealand) Danny Lee
9	Jan 13, 2019	Sony Open in Hawaii	63-63-66-66=258	−22	4 strokes	(United States) Andrew Putnam

PGA Tour playoff record (2–1)

No.	Year	Tournament	Opponent	Result
1	2009	Turning Stone Resort Championship	(United States) Vaughn Taylor	Won with par on sixth extra hole
2	2010	The Barclays	(Scotland) Martin Laird	Won with birdie on first extra hole
3	2014	Shell Houston Open	(Australia) Matt Jones	Lost to birdie on first extra hole

=== Japan Golf Tour wins (1) ===
No.	Date	Tournament	Winning score	To par	Margin of victory	Runner-up
1	Jan 19, 2020	SMBC Singapore Open^{1}	66-68-62-70=266	−18	3 strokes	(England) Justin Rose

^{1}Co-sanctioned by the Asian Tour

=== PGA Tour of Australasia wins (1) ===
No.	Date	Tournament	Winning score	To par	Margin of victory	Runner-up
1	Oct 18, 2015	Fiji International^{1}	74-72-69-69=284	−4	4 strokes	(Australia) Aron Price

^{1}Co-sanctioned by the OneAsia Tour

=== Nationwide Tour wins (1) ===
No.	Date	Tournament	Winning score	To par	Margin of victory	Runner-up
1	May 21, 2006	Henrico County Open	71-67-69-72=279	−9	Playoff	(United States) Paul Claxton

Nationwide Tour playoff record (1–0)

No.	Year	Tournament	Opponent	Result
1	2006	Henrico County Open	(United States) Paul Claxton	Won with birdie on third extra hole

=== Other wins (7) ===
No.	Date	Tournament	Winning score	To par	Margin of victory	Runners-up
1	Jun 21, 2011	CVS Caremark Charity Classic (with (United States) Zach Johnson)	58-60=118	−24	2 strokes	(United States) Davis Love III and (United States) Morgan Pressel
2	Nov 27, 2011	Omega Mission Hills World Cup (with (United States) Gary Woodland)	64-70-63-67=264	−24	2 strokes	England − Ian Poulter and Justin Rose, Germany − Alex Čejka and Martin Kaymer
3	Dec 15, 2013	Franklin Templeton Shootout (with (United States) Harris English)	64-60-58=182	−34	7 strokes	(South Africa) Retief Goosen and (Sweden) Freddie Jacobson
4	Oct 25, 2015	Bridgestone America's Golf Cup (with (United States) Justin Hueber)	67-60-63-60=250	−34	4 strokes	(Puerto Rico) Rafael Campos and (Puerto Rico) Edward Figueroa
5	Dec 10, 2016	Franklin Templeton Shootout (2) (with (United States) Harris English)	57-66-65=188	−28	1 stroke	(United States) Jerry Kelly and (United States) Steve Stricker
6	Dec 13, 2020	QBE Shootout (3) (with (United States) Harris English)	58-61-60=179	−37	9 strokes	(Slovakia) Rory Sabbatini and (United States) Kevin Tway
7	Dec 21, 2025	PNC Championship (with son Cameron Kuchar)	57-54=111	−33	7 strokes	(United States) John Daly and son John Daly II, (United States) Davis Love III and son Dru Love

== Results in major championships ==
Results not in chronological order in 2020.

Tournament	1998	1999
Masters Tournament	T21LA	T50
U.S. Open	T14LA	CUT
The Open Championship	CUT	
PGA Championship		

Tournament	2000	2001	2002	2003	2004	2005	2006	2007	2008	2009
Masters Tournament			CUT							
U.S. Open			CUT			CUT	CUT		T48	CUT
The Open Championship			CUT					CUT	CUT	CUT
PGA Championship			CUT							CUT

Tournament	2010	2011	2012	2013	2014	2015	2016	2017	2018
Masters Tournament	T24	T27	T3	T8	T5	T46	T24	T4	T28
U.S. Open	T6	T14	T27	T28	T12	T12	T46	T16	CUT
The Open Championship	T27	CUT	T9	T15	T54	T58	T46	2	T9
PGA Championship	T10	T19	CUT	T22		T7	CUT	T9	CUT

Tournament	2019	2020	2021	2022	2023	2024
Masters Tournament	T12	CUT	CUT			
PGA Championship	T8	CUT	CUT	T34	CUT	
U.S. Open	T16	CUT	CUT		CUT	T50
The Open Championship	T41	NT	CUT			

Top 10
Did not play

LA = low amateur
CUT = missed the half-way cut
"T" = tied
NT = no tournament due to COVID-19 pandemic

=== Summary ===
Tournament	Wins	2nd	3rd	Top-5	Top-10	Top-25	Events	Cuts made
Masters Tournament	0	0	1	3	4	8	15	12
PGA Championship	0	0	0	0	4	6	15	7
U.S. Open	0	0	0	0	1	7	21	12
The Open Championship	0	1	0	1	3	4	16	9
Totals	0	1	1	4	12	25	67	40

- Most consecutive cuts made – 14 (2013 Masters – 2016 Open Championship)
- Longest streak of top-10s – 2 (2017 Open Championship – 2017 PGA)

== The Players Championship ==
=== Wins (1) ===
Year	Championship	54 holes	Winning score	Margin	Runners-up
2012	The Players Championship	1 shot deficit	−13 (68-68-69-70=275)	2 strokes	(United States) Ben Curtis, (United States) Rickie Fowler, (United States) Zach Johnson, (Scotland) Martin Laird

=== Results timeline ===
Tournament	2002	2003	2004	2005	2006	2007	2008	2009
The Players Championship	WD	CUT	T16				CUT	T14

Tournament	2010	2011	2012	2013	2014	2015	2016	2017	2018	2019
The Players Championship	T13	T54	1	T48	T17	CUT	T3	82	T17	T26

Tournament	2020	2021	2022	2023	2024	2025
The Players Championship	C	CUT	CUT	CUT	CUT	T42

Win
Top 10
Did not play

CUT = missed the halfway cut
WD = withdrew
"T" indicates a tie for a place
C = Canceled after the first round due to the COVID-19 pandemic

== World Golf Championships ==
=== Wins (1) ===
Year	Championship	54 holes	Winning score	Margin	Runner-up
2013	WGC-Accenture Match Play Championship	n/a	2 and 1		(United States) Hunter Mahan

=== Results timeline ===
Results not in chronological order before 2015.

Tournament	2002	2003	2004	2005	2006	2007	2008	2009	2010	2011	2012	2013	2014	2015	2016	2017	2018	2019
Championship									T3	5	T8	T35	T13	T23	T28	T20	T58	50
Match Play									R32	3	QF	1	R16	T34	R16	T30	R16	2
Invitational	T38								T9	T19	T8	T27	T12	T25	T3	T17	T14	T43
Champions								T19							T21	T31		

Tournament	2020	2021	2022	2023
Championship	T22	T44		
Match Play	NT^{1}	3		R16
Invitational	T25			
Champions	NT^{1}	NT^{1}	NT^{1}	

^{1}Cancelled due to COVID-19 pandemic

Win
Top 10
Did not play

QF, R16, R32, R64 = Round in which player lost in match play
NT = No tournament
"T" = Tied
Note that the HSBC Champions did not become a WGC event until 2009.
Note that the Championship and Invitational were discontinued from 2022. The Champions was discontinued from 2023.

== PGA Tour career summary ==
Season	Wins	Earnings (US$)	Rank
2001	0	572,669	92
2002	1	1,237,725	49
2003	0	176,047	182
2004	0	509,257	139
2005	0	402,786	159
2006	0	30,297	241
2007	0	886,146	115
2008	0	1,447,638	70
2009	1	2,489,193	24
2010	1	4,910,477	1
2011	0	4,233,920	6
2012	1	3,903,065	11
2013	2	5,616,808	3
2014	1	4,695,515	9
2015	0	2,774,170	28
2016	0	3,819,678	15
2017	0	4,282,489	14
2018	0	1,720,097	71
2019	2	6,294,690	3
2020	0	1,515,585	55
2021	0	1,348,917	94
2022*	0	1,639,128	43
Career*	9	54,506,297	9

* As of April 17, 2022

== U.S. national team appearances ==
Amateur

- Eisenhower Trophy: 1998
- Palmer Cup: 1998 (tie), 1999 (winners)
- Walker Cup: 1999

Professional

- Ryder Cup: 2010, 2012, 2014, 2016 (winners)
- Presidents Cup: 2011 (winners), 2013 (winners), 2015 (winners), 2017 (winners), 2019 (winners)
- World Cup: 2011 (winners), 2013, 2018

== See also ==
- 2006 Nationwide Tour graduates
