= 2012 Masters Tournament =

American golf tournament held in 2012

- Front cover of the 2012 Masters Journal

Tournament information
- Dates: April 5–8, 2012
- Location: Augusta, Georgia, U.S. 33.503°N 82.020°W
- Course: Augusta National Golf Club
- Organized by: Augusta National Golf Club
- Tours: PGA Tour; European Tour; Japan Golf Tour

Statistics
- Par: 72
- Length: 7,435 yards (6,799 m)
- Field: 95 players, 63 after cut
- Cut: 149 (+5)
- Prize fund: US$8,000,000
- Winner's share: $1,440,000

Champion
- (United States) Bubba Watson
- 278 (−10), playoff

Location map
- Location in the United States Location in Georgia

The 2012 Masters Tournament was the 76th Masters Tournament, held April 5–8 at Augusta National Golf Club in Augusta, Georgia. Bubba Watson won the year's first major championship on the second hole of a sudden-death playoff, defeating Louis Oosthuizen. It was his first major title and his fourth victory on the PGA Tour. Watson was the eighth consecutive first-time major champion, and the 14th winner in as many majors. He won a second Masters two years later in 2014.

Two pre-tournament favorites, Tiger Woods and Rory McIlroy, both finished at 293 (+5) in a tie for 40th place. Phil Mickelson was in the final pairing and in contention during the final round, but a triple-bogey six on the fourth hole knocked him back and he finished two strokes behind, in a four-way tie for third. Bo Van Pelt posted the lowest round of the tournament with a 64 (−8) early on Sunday, which propelled him up the leaderboard 35 places to tie for 17th.

It was the first playoff in three years at the Masters; Ángel Cabrera won on the second extra hole in 2009.

== Course ==
Hole	Name	Yards	Par	Hole	Name	Yards	Par
1	Tea Olive	445	4	10	Camellia	495	4
2	Pink Dogwood	575	5	11	White Dogwood	505	4
3	Flowering Peach	350	4	12	Golden Bell	155	3
4	Flowering Crab Apple	240	3	13	Azalea	510	5
5	Magnolia	455	4	14	Chinese Fir	440	4
6	Juniper	180	3	15	Firethorn	530	5
7	Pampas	450	4	16	Redbud	170	3
8	Yellow Jasmine	570	5	17	Nandina	440	4
9	Carolina Cherry	460	4	18	Holly	465	4
Out		3,725	36	In		3,710	36
Source:				Total		7,435	72

== Field ==
The Masters has the smallest field of the four major championships. Officially, the Masters remains an invitation event, but there is a set of qualifying criteria that determines who is included in the field. Each player is classified according to the first category by which he qualified, but other categories are shown in parentheses.

Golfers who qualify based solely on their performance in amateur tournaments (categories 6–10) must remain amateurs on the starting day of the tournament to be eligible to play.

Three players were appearing in their first major: Kelly Kraft, Corbin Mills and Randal Lewis. Twelve others were appearing in their first Masters: Keegan Bradley, Patrick Cantlay, Bryden Macpherson, Kevin Chappell, Robert Garrigus, Webb Simpson, Harrison Frazar, Kyle Stanley, Scott Stallings, Brendan Steele, Bae Sang-moon and Gonzalo Fernández-Castaño.

Notable absences included Mark O'Meara (injured), Ernie Els and Retief Goosen (not ranked high enough). O'Meara had appeared in the previous 27 Masters, Els in the previous 18, and Goosen in the previous 12. (Els would win the Open Championship in July to ensure an invitation to the next five Masters.)

1. Past Masters Champions

- Ángel Cabrera (2,11)
- Fred Couples (11)
- Ben Crenshaw
- Trevor Immelman (11)
- Zach Johnson (18,19)
- Bernhard Langer
- Sandy Lyle
- Phil Mickelson (13,15,16,17,18,19)
- Larry Mize
- José María Olazábal
- Charl Schwartzel (11,15,18,19)
- Vijay Singh (15,17)
- Craig Stadler
- Tom Watson
- Mike Weir
- Tiger Woods (2,4,11,16,18,19)
- Ian Woosnam
- Mark O'Meara withdrew shortly before his tee time due to injury.
- Past champions not playing: Tommy Aaron, Jack Burke Jr., Billy Casper, Charles Coody, Nick Faldo, Raymond Floyd, Doug Ford, Bob Goalby, Jack Nicklaus, Arnold Palmer, Gary Player and Fuzzy Zoeller. Player joined Nicklaus and Palmer to serve as "honorary starters" and teed off on the first day at the first hole to kick off the tournament.

2. Last five U.S. Open Champions

- Lucas Glover (16)
- Graeme McDowell (18,19)
- Rory McIlroy (11,12,16,18,19)

3. Last five British Open Champions

- Stewart Cink
- Darren Clarke (13,18)
- Pádraig Harrington (4)
- Louis Oosthuizen (18,19)

4. Last five PGA Champions

- Keegan Bradley (14,15,16,17,18,19)
- Martin Kaymer (18,19)
- Yang Yong-eun (12,17,18,19)

5. Last three winners of The Players Championship

- K. J. Choi (11,15,17,18,19)
- Tim Clark
- Henrik Stenson

6. Top two finishers in the 2011 U.S. Amateur

- Patrick Cantlay (a)
- Kelly Kraft (a)

7. Winner of the 2011 Amateur Championship

- Bryden Macpherson (a)

8. Winner of the 2011 Asian Amateur

- Hideki Matsuyama (a)

9. Winner of the 2011 U.S. Amateur Public Links

- Corbin Mills (a)

10. Winner of the 2011 U.S. Mid-Amateur

- Randal Lewis (a)

11. The top 16 finishers and ties in the 2011 Masters Tournament

- Jason Day (12,15,17,18,19)
- Luke Donald (15,16,17,18,19)
- Ross Fisher
- Edoardo Molinari
- Geoff Ogilvy (17,18,19)
- Ryan Palmer
- Justin Rose (15,16,17,18,19)
- Adam Scott (15,16,17,18,19)
- Brandt Snedeker (15,16,17,18,19)
- Steve Stricker (15,16,17,18,19)
- Bo Van Pelt (15,17,18,19)
- Lee Westwood (12,18,19)

12. Top 8 finishers and ties in the 2011 U.S. Open

- Kevin Chappell
- Sergio García (18,19)
- Robert Garrigus
- Peter Hanson (18,19)

13. Top 4 finishers and ties in the 2011 British Open Championship

- Thomas Bjørn (18,19)
- Dustin Johnson (15,16,17,18,19) withdrew with a back injury prior to the start of the tournament.

14. Top 4 finishers and ties in the 2011 PGA Championship

- Jason Dufner (15,17,18,19)
- Anders Hansen (18,19)
- Robert Karlsson (18,19)
- David Toms (15,16,17,18,19)
- Scott Verplank

15. Top 30 leaders on the 2011 PGA Tour official money earnings list

- Aaron Baddeley (17,18,19)
- Jonathan Byrd (17)
- Bill Haas (16,17,18,19)
- Charles Howell III (17)
- Freddie Jacobson (16,17,18,19)
- Matt Kuchar (17,18,19)
- Martin Laird (18,19)
- Hunter Mahan (16,17,18,19)
- Kevin Na
- Rory Sabbatini
- Webb Simpson (16,17,18,19)
- Nick Watney (16,17,18,19)
- Bubba Watson (16,17,18,19)
- Mark Wilson (16,17,19)
- Gary Woodland (17)

16. Winners of PGA Tour events that award a full-point allocation for the season-ending Tour Championship, between the 2011 Masters Tournament and the 2012 Masters Tournament

- Harrison Frazar
- Sean O'Hair
- Scott Stallings
- Kyle Stanley (19)
- Brendan Steele
- Johnson Wagner

17. All players qualifying for the 2011 edition of The Tour Championship

- Chez Reavie
- John Senden (18,19)

18. Top 50 on the final 2011 Official World Golf Ranking list

- Bae Sang-moon (19)
- Paul Casey (19)
- Simon Dyson (19)
- Gonzalo Fernández-Castaño
- Rickie Fowler (19)
- Jim Furyk (19)
- Miguel Ángel Jiménez
- Kim Kyung-tae (19)
- Francesco Molinari (19)
- Ian Poulter (19)
- Álvaro Quirós (19)

19. Top 50 on the Official World Golf Ranking list on March 25, 2012

- Ben Crane
- Paul Lawrie

20. International invitees

- Ryo Ishikawa

== Round summaries ==
=== First round ===
Thursday, April 5, 2012

Place	Player	Score	To par
1	(England) Lee Westwood	67	−5
T2	(Sweden) Peter Hanson	68	−4
T2	(South Africa) Louis Oosthuizen	68	−4
T4	(United States) Ben Crane	69	−3
T4	(United States) Jason Dufner	69	−3
T4	(Spain) Miguel Ángel Jiménez	69	−3
T4	(Scotland) Paul Lawrie	69	−3
T4	(Italy) Francesco Molinari	69	−3
T4	(United States) Bubba Watson	69	−3
T10	(United States) Jim Furyk	70	−2
T10	(United States) Zach Johnson	70	−2
T10	(Fiji) Vijay Singh	70	−2
T10	(United States) Scott Stallings	70	−2

=== Second round ===
Friday, April 6, 2012

Place	Player	Score	To par
T1	(United States) Fred Couples	72-67=139	−5
T1	(United States) Jason Dufner	69-70=139	−5
T3	(Spain) Sergio García	72-68=140	−4
T3	(Northern Ireland) Rory McIlroy	71-69=140	−4
T3	(South Africa) Louis Oosthuizen	68-72=140	−4
T3	(United States) Bubba Watson	69-71=140	−4
T3	(England) Lee Westwood	67-73=140	−4
T8	(Spain) Miguel Ángel Jiménez	69-72=141	−3
T8	(United States) Matt Kuchar	71-70=141	−3
T8	(Scotland) Paul Lawrie	69-72=141	−3

Amateurs: Matsuyama (+1), Cantlay (+5), Kraft (+5), Macpherson (+9), Mills (+11), Lewis (+15).

=== Third round ===
Saturday, April 7, 2012

Place	Player	Score	To par
1	(Sweden) Peter Hanson	68-74-65=207	−9
2	(United States) Phil Mickelson	74-68-66=208	−8
3	(South Africa) Louis Oosthuizen	68-72-69=209	−7
4	(United States) Bubba Watson	69-71-70=210	−6
5	(United States) Matt Kuchar	71-70-70=211	−5
T6	(Republic of Ireland) Pádraig Harrington	71-73-68=212	−4
T6	(United States) Hunter Mahan	72-72-68=212	−4
T6	(Sweden) Henrik Stenson	71-71-70=212	−4
T6	(England) Lee Westwood	67-73-72=212	−4
10	(Scotland) Paul Lawrie	69-72-72=213	−3

=== Final round ===
Sunday, April 8, 2012

==== Summary ====
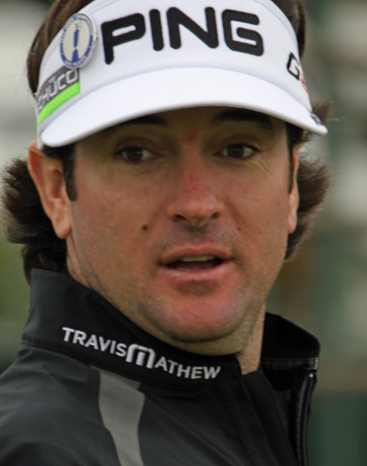
Bubba Watson won his first Masters title

External videos
- Full final round coverage on CBS on YouTube

For the third time in seven years, the Masters concluded on Easter Sunday. The leaderboard was active, as four players held at least a share of the lead during the final round. Louis Oosthuizen charged into the lead at the second hole with an albatross two on the par-5. It was only the fourth double eagle in Masters history and the first-ever on the second hole. The final pairing faltered: 54-hole leader Peter Hanson never got it going, with three bogeys before he carded his first birdie at the 15th hole. Three holes earlier, Hanson shanked his tee shot on the par-3 12th short of the water, bogeyed, and fell from contention. On the front nine, three-time Masters champion Phil Mickelson pushed his tee shot left at the par-3 fourth and it caromed off a greenside grandstand. He made his second triple bogey of the week and came up two shots short of the playoff.

In the end, it came down to a three player race between Oosthuizen, Bubba Watson, and Matt Kuchar. Kuchar hit his approach at the 15th hole to three feet (0.9 m) and eagled to temporarily tie Oosthuizen at −9, but followed it with a bogey at the par-3 16th hole and finished two strokes back, in the four-way tie for third. After Watson made a two at the 16th for his fourth consecutive birdie, he was tied at the top with Oosthuizen at −10. Playing together in the penultimate pairing, both parred the 17th hole and were on the green in regulation at the uphill 18th. Oosthuizen missed a 35-foot (11 m) birdie putt from the back shelf and Watson had 25 feet (8 m) for his first major, but he missed the putt on the high side. After Watson tapped in, Oosthuizen holed his four-footer (1.2 m) to force a sudden death playoff.

==== Final leaderboard ====
Champion
Silver Cup winner (low amateur)
(a) = amateur
(c) = past champion

Top 10
Place	Player	Score	To par	Money (US$)
T1	(South Africa) Louis Oosthuizen	68-72-69-69=278	−10	Playoff
T1	(United States) Bubba Watson	69-71-70-68=278	−10	Playoff
T3	(Sweden) Peter Hanson	68-74-65-73=280	−8	384,000
T3	(United States) Matt Kuchar	71-70-70-69=280	−8	384,000
T3	(United States) Phil Mickelson (c)	74-68-66-72=280	−8	384,000
T3	(England) Lee Westwood	67-73-72-68=280	−8	384,000
7	(England) Ian Poulter	72-72-70-69=283	−5	268,000
T8	(Republic of Ireland) Pádraig Harrington	71-73-68-72=284	−4	232,000
T8	(England) Justin Rose	72-72-72-68=284	−4	232,000
T8	(Australia) Adam Scott	75-70-73-66=284	−4	232,000

Leaderboard below the top 10
Place	Player	Score	To par	Money ($)
11	(United States) Jim Furyk	70-73-72-70=285	−3	200,000
T12	(United States) Fred Couples (c)	72-67-75-72=286	−2	156,800
T12	(Spain) Sergio García	72-68-75-71=286	−2	156,800
T12	(United States) Hunter Mahan	72-72-68-74=286	−2	156,800
T12	(Northern Ireland) Graeme McDowell	75-72-71-68=286	−2	156,800
T12	(United States) Kevin Na	71-75-72-68=286	−2	156,800
T17	(United States) Ben Crane	69-73-72-73=287	−1	124,000
T17	(United States) Bo Van Pelt	73-75-75-64=287	−1	124,000
T19	(United States) Charles Howell III	72-70-74-72=288	E	96,960
T19	(Sweden) Freddie Jacobson	76-68-70-74=288	E	96,960
T19	(Italy) Francesco Molinari	69-75-70-74=288	E	96,960
T19	(Australia) Geoff Ogilvy	74-72-71-71=288	E	96,960
T19	(United States) Brandt Snedeker	72-75-68-73=288	E	96,960
T24	(United States) Jason Dufner	69-70-75-75=289	+1	70,400
T24	(Denmark) Anders Hansen	76-72-73-68=289	+1	70,400
T24	(Scotland) Paul Lawrie	69-72-72-76=289	+1	70,400
T27	(United States) Keegan Bradley	71-77-73-69=290	+2	56,800
T27	(United States) Jonathan Byrd	72-71-72-75=290	+2	56,800
T27	(United States) Rickie Fowler	74-74-72-70=290	+2	56,800
T27	(Fiji) Vijay Singh (c)	70-72-76-72=290	+2	56,800
T27	(United States) Scott Stallings	70-77-70-73=290	+2	56,800
T32	(Argentina) Ángel Cabrera (c)	71-78-71-71=291	+3	45,280
T32	(England) Luke Donald	75-73-75-68=291	+3	45,280
T32	(United States) Zach Johnson (c)	70-74-75-72=291	+3	45,280
T32	(United States) Sean O'Hair	73-70-71-77=291	+3	45,280
T32	(United States) Nick Watney	71-71-72-77=291	+3	45,280
T37	(South Korea) Bae Sang-moon	75-71-69-77=292	+4	37,600
T37	(Denmark) Thomas Bjørn	73-76-74-69=292	+4	37,600
T37	(United States) Bill Haas	72-74-76-70=292	+4	37,600
T40	(Australia) Aaron Baddeley	71-71-77-74=293	+5	32,000
T40	(Northern Ireland) Rory McIlroy	71-69-77-76=293	+5	32,000
T40	(Sweden) Henrik Stenson	71-71-70-81=293	+5	32,000
T40	(United States) Tiger Woods (c)	72-75-72-74=293	+5	32,000
T44	(United States) Kevin Chappell	71-76-71-76=294	+6	26,400
T44	(Germany) Martin Kaymer	72-75-75-72=294	+6	26,400
T44	(United States) Webb Simpson	72-74-70-78=294	+6	26,400
T47	(United States) Patrick Cantlay (a)	71-78-74-72=295	+7	0
T47	(England) Ross Fisher	71-77-73-74=295	+7	22,560
T47	(United States) Steve Stricker	71-77-72-75=295	+7	22,560
T50	(United States) Stewart Cink	71-75-81-69=296	+8	19,960
T50	(Sweden) Robert Karlsson	74-74-77-71=296	+8	19,960
T50	(South Africa) Charl Schwartzel (c)	72-75-75-74=296	+8	19,960
T50	(United States) David Toms	73-73-75-75=296	+8	19,960
T54	(Japan) Hideki Matsuyama (a)	71-74-72-80=297	+9	0
T54	(United States) Scott Verplank	73-75-75-74=297	+9	18,880
56	(Spain) Miguel Ángel Jiménez	69-72-76-81=298	+10	18,560
T57	(Scotland) Martin Laird	76-72-74-77=299	+11	18,240
T57	(Italy) Edoardo Molinari	75-74-76-74=299	+11	18,240
T57	(South Korea) Yang Yong-eun	73-70-75-81=299	+11	18,240
60	(South Africa) Trevor Immelman (c)	78-71-76-76=301	+13	17,920
61	(Spain) Gonzalo Fernández-Castaño	74-75-76-77=302	+14	17,760
62	(United States) Kelly Kraft (a)	74-75-77-80=306	+18	0
CUT	(South Korea) Kim Kyung-tae	74-76=150	+6	
CUT	(Australia) John Senden	74-76=150	+6	
CUT	(England) Paul Casey	76-75=151	+7	
CUT	(United States) Harrison Frazar	73-78=151	+7	
CUT	(United States) Larry Mize (c)	76-75=151	+7	
CUT	(Spain) José María Olazábal (c)	75-76=151	+7	
CUT	(United States) Kyle Stanley	75-76=151	+7	
CUT	(United States) Tom Watson (c)	77-74=151	+7	
CUT	(Canada) Mike Weir (c)	72-79=151	+7	
CUT	(United States) Robert Garrigus	77-75=152	+8	
CUT	(Germany) Bernhard Langer (c)	72-80=152	+8	
CUT	(United States) Ryan Palmer	75-77=152	+8	
CUT	(South Africa) Rory Sabbatini	72-80=152	+8	
CUT	(South Korea) K. J. Choi	77-76=153	+9	
CUT	(Japan) Ryo Ishikawa	76-77=153	+9	
CUT	(Australia) Bryden Macpherson (a)	77-76=153	+9	
CUT	(United States) Chez Reavie	79-74=153	+9	
CUT	(United States) Johnson Wagner	79-74=153	+9	
CUT	(South Africa) Tim Clark	73-81=154	+10	
CUT	(Northern Ireland) Darren Clarke	73-81=154	+10	
CUT	(United States) Lucas Glover	75-79=154	+10	
CUT	(United States) Mark Wilson	76-78=154	+10	
CUT	(Wales) Ian Woosnam (c)	77-77=154	+10	
CUT	(England) Simon Dyson	78-77=155	+11	
CUT	(United States) Corbin Mills (a)	74-81=155	+11	
CUT	(Spain) Álvaro Quirós	78-77=155	+11	
CUT	(United States) Brendan Steele	76-80=156	+12	
CUT	(United States) Ben Crenshaw (c)	76-83=159	+15	
CUT	(United States) Randal Lewis (a)	81-78=159	+15	
CUT	(United States) Craig Stadler (c)	81-82=163	+19	
CUT	(Scotland) Sandy Lyle (c)	86-78=164	+20	
WD	(United States) Gary Woodland	73-70-85=228	+12	
WD	(Australia) Jason Day	76	+4	

==== Scorecard ====
Hole	1	2	3	4	5	6	7	8	9	10	11	12	13	14	15	16	17	18
Par	4	5	4	3	4	3	4	5	4	4	4	3	5	4	5	3	4	4
(United States) Watson	−5	−6	−6	−6	−7	−7	−7	−7	−7	−7	−7	−6	−7	−8	−9	−10	−10	−10
(South Africa) Oosthuizen	−7	−10	−10	−9	−9	−9	−9	−9	−9	−8	−8	−8	−9	−9	−10	−10	−10	−10
(Sweden) Hanson	−8	−8	−7	−7	−7	−7	−7	−7	−7	−7	−7	−6	−6	−6	−7	−7	−7	−8
(United States) Kuchar	−5	−5	−6	−6	−6	−6	−7	−7	−5	−5	−5	−6	−7	−7	−9	−8	−8	−8
(United States) Mickelson	−8	−8	−8	−5	−5	−5	−5	−6	−6	−6	−6	−6	−7	−7	−8	−8	−8	−8
(England) Westwood	−3	−4	−3	−3	−3	−4	−5	−4	−4	−4	−4	−4	−5	−6	−7	−7	−7	−8

Cumulative tournament scores, relative to par

Double Eagle/Albatross	Eagle	Birdie	Bogey	Double bogey	Triple bogey +

=== Playoff ===
The sudden death playoff started at the par-4 18th hole, where both players hit the fairway and green, and similar to the final round, Bubba Watson was closer to the pin than Louis Oosthuizen. Oosthuizen narrowly missed his 18-foot (5.5 m) birdie effort which gave Watson another opportunity to secure the title. Watson's putt from 16 feet (5 m) was low the entire way, and after both players tapped in to tie they headed to the next tee at the downhill par-4 10th hole.

Both players hit poor drives to the right, and Oosthuizen's second shot ended up short of the green. The left-handed Watson, playing from the pine straw deep in the woods, hooked his approach shot nearly 90 degrees to within 10 feet (3 m) of the hole. Oosthuizen chipped to the back of the green and narrowly missed his par putt to give Watson two putts to win. He lagged his first to a foot (0.3 m) and tapped in to become the Masters champion.

Place	Player	Score	To par	Money ($)
1	(United States) Bubba Watson	4-4=8	E	1,440,000
2	(South Africa) Louis Oosthuizen	4-5=9	+1	864,000

==== Scorecard ====
Hole	18	10
Par	4	4
(United States) Watson	E	E
(South Africa) Oosthuizen	E	+1

Cumulative playoff scores, relative to par
