= Bubba Watson =

American professional golfer (born 1978)

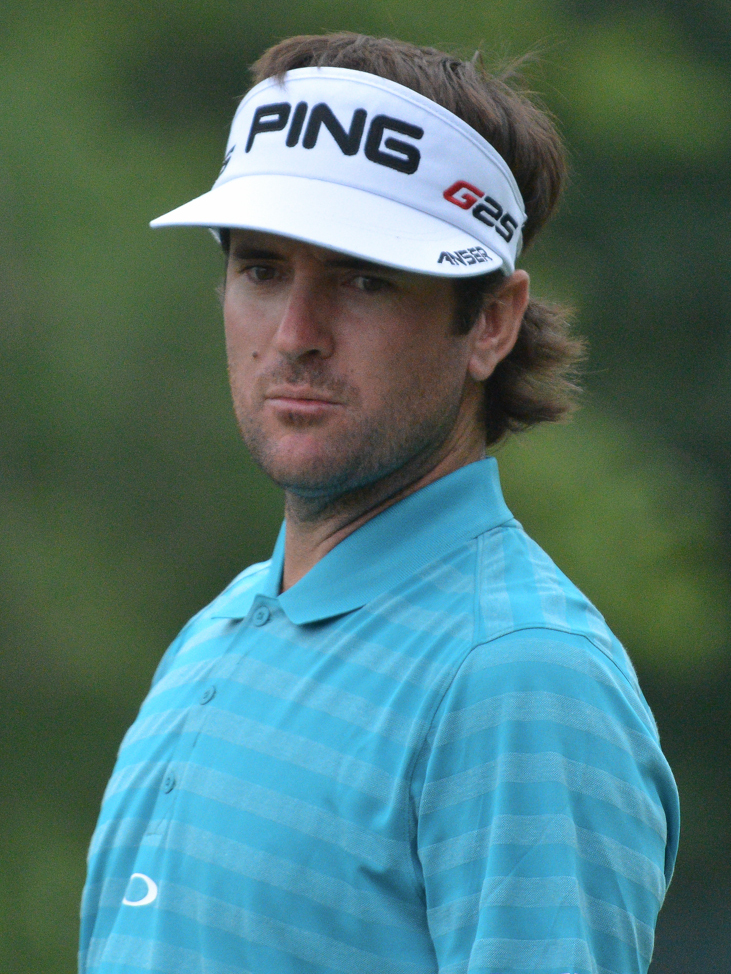
- Watson in 2013

Personal information
- Full name: Gerry Lester Watson Jr.
- Nickname: Bubba
- Nationality: United States
- Born: November 5, 1978 (age 48) Bagdad, Florida, U.S.
- Height: 6 ft 3 in (1.91 m)
- Weight: 180 lb (82 kg; 13 st)
- Spouse: Angie Watson (m. 2004)
- Children: 2

Career
- Sport: Golf
- College: Faulkner State Community College; University of Georgia
- Turned professional: 2002
- Current tour: LIV Golf
- Former tours: PGA Tour; Nationwide Tour; NGA Hooters Tour
- Professional wins: 15
- Highest ranking: 2 (February 22, 2015)

Number of wins by tour
- PGA Tour: 12
- European Tour: 4
- Other: 3

Best results in major championships (wins: 2)
- Masters Tournament: Won: 2012, 2014
- PGA Championship: 2nd: 2010
- U.S. Open: T5: 2007
- The Open Championship: T23: 2012

Gerry Lester "Bubba" Watson Jr. (born November 5, 1978) is an American professional golfer. He has two major championships, with victories at the Masters Tournament in 2012 and 2014, and a total of 12 PGA Tour wins. In February 2015, Watson reached a career-high second place in the Official World Golf Ranking. Watson joined the LIV Golf League in 2022.

One of few left-handed tour golfers, Watson has consistently been among the longest drivers; in 2007, he had an average drive of 315.2 yards (288.2 m). He can hit a ball over 350 yards (320 m) and up to 194 mph (312 km/h). He has finished top of the driving distance statistics five times, during the 2006, 2007, 2008, 2012, and 2014 seasons.

== Amateur career ==
Watson was born and raised in Bagdad, Florida, near Pensacola. He played on the golf team at Milton High School, just after future PGA Tour members Heath Slocum and Boo Weekley. Watson played golf for Faulkner State Community College in nearby Baldwin County, Alabama, where he was a junior college All-American. He transferred to the University of Georgia, the defending NCAA champions, and played for the Bulldogs in 2000 and 2001. As a junior, Watson helped lead the Bulldogs to the SEC title in 2000.

== Professional career ==
Watson turned professional in 2002 and joined the Nationwide Tour, where he played until 2005. He finished 21st on the Nationwide Tour's money list in 2005, making him the last player to qualify for the following year's PGA Tour. As a rookie in 2006, he earned $1,019,264 (90th overall) and led the PGA Tour in driving distance at 319.6 yards (292.2 m). His longest drive in professional competition was 424 yards (388 m) on the PGA Tour at the WGC-Bridgestone Invitational.

Watson played well at the 2007 U.S. Open. He was in the final group on Saturday after shooting rounds of 70-71 (+1) at Oakmont Country Club near Pittsburgh. Watson was one stroke off the lead after 36 holes but then slipped, shooting 74 (+4) in both the third and fourth rounds; he finished in a tie for fifth.

=== 2010 ===
Watson claimed his first PGA Tour win on June 27, 2010, in Cromwell, Connecticut, at the Travelers Championship on the second hole of a sudden-death playoff with Corey Pavin and Scott Verplank. Watson tearfully dedicated the win to his parents, specifically his father who was battling cancer.

Watson was runner-up to Martin Kaymer at the PGA Championship at Whistling Straits, falling in the three-hole aggregate playoff that included Dustin Johnson until he incurred a two-stroke penalty on the 72nd hole. Watson led the playoff after a birdie on the first hole, but Kaymer birdied the par-3 second hole to tie, effectively turning the playoff into sudden-death. Watson's second shot found the water hazard and Kaymer bested him by a stroke to win the major championship.

Watson had his own clothing line called "Bubba Golf" at the former Steve & Barry's. He was invited on The Ellen DeGeneres Show after he sent her a video of a golf trick shot he completed for her birthday.

=== 2011 ===
On January 30, 2011, Watson won his second PGA Tour event, the Farmers Insurance Open, finishing one stroke ahead of runner-up Phil Mickelson. Watson picked up his second win of the 2011 season and third career PGA Tour title on May 1 when he defeated Webb Simpson at the second playoff hole at the Zurich Classic of New Orleans. Both players birdied the first playoff hole, with Watson holing a 12-footer; he birdied the next hole to win the tournament.

In July 2011, Watson provoked controversy by criticizing the Alstom Open de France on the European Tour, in which he was playing under a sponsor's exemption. He indicated after his first round that he would not be playing any further events on the European Tour, and complained after his second round about security and organization at the tournament.

Watson took part in the Long Drive Contest for charity at the Hyundai Tournament of Champions alongside Dustin Johnson and Robert Garrigus. He finished in second place, with a longest drive of 370 yards (338 m) behind a drive of over 400 yards (366 m) by Jamie Sadlowski.

=== 2012 ===
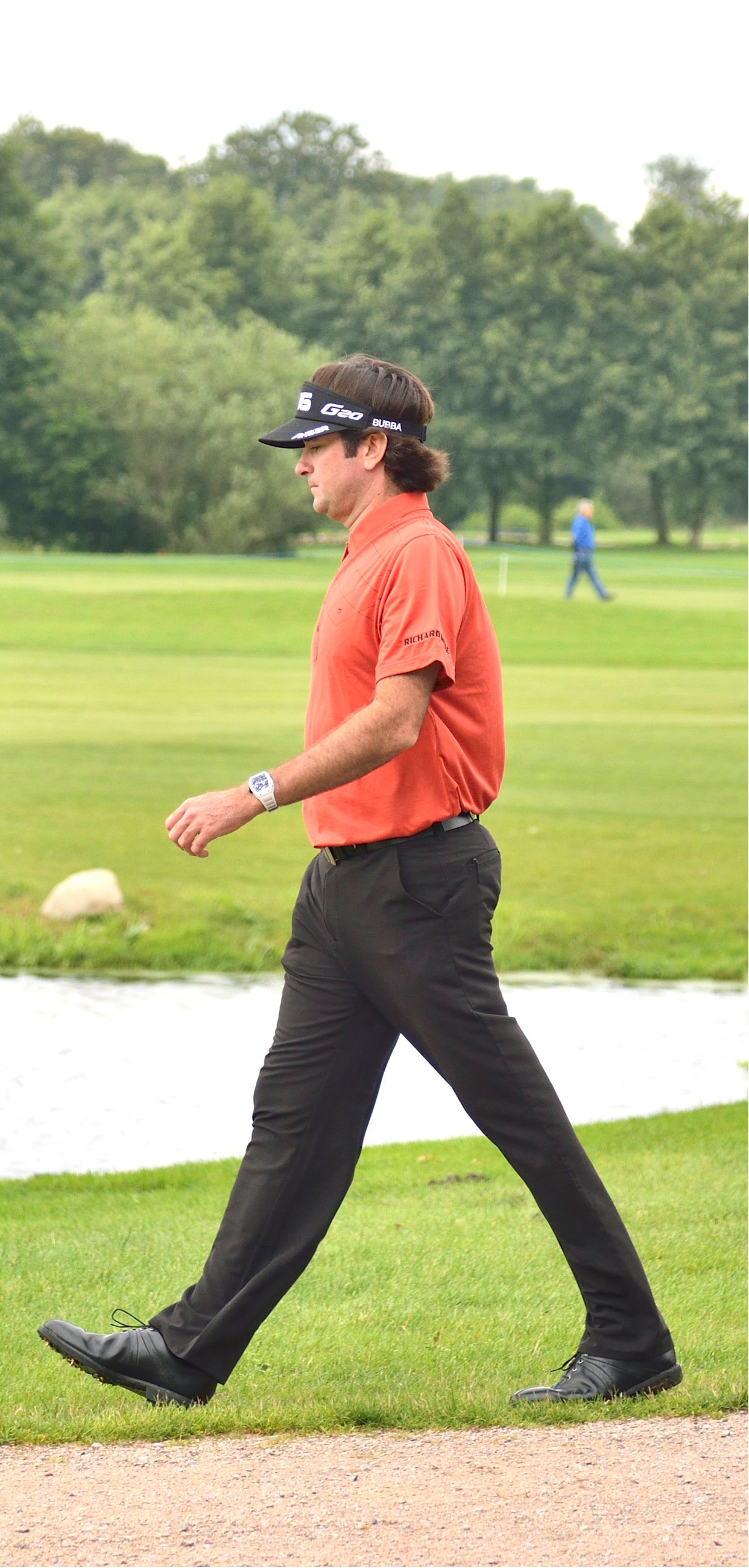
Watson at Schüco Open, 2012

Watson began the year with three top-5 finishes in seven events, including finishing second at the WGC-Cadillac Championship.

==== Masters win ====
Watson's first major championship win came at the Masters. He began the final round at six-under-par, three strokes off the lead, held by Peter Hanson. On the back nine, Watson bogeyed the par-3 12th hole to return to even par for the round. He then recorded four consecutive birdies for a round of 68 (-4) and tied for the 72-hole lead with fourth-round playing partner Louis Oosthuizen at ten-under-par. In the sudden-death playoff, Oosthuizen and Watson both made par on the uphill 18th hole. On the next hole, the downhill 10th, both drove their tee shots towards the woods to the right of the hole. Oosthuizen's landed in the rough 220 yards (200 m) away, while Watson's ball landed deep in the woods on pine straw, 164 yards (150 m) from the pin without a clear shot to the green. Watson executed a recovery shot with 40 yards of hook on his 52-degree gap wedge and stopped the ball within fifteen feet of the hole. Oosthuizen's approach shot landed short of the green, but he chipped past the hole and narrowly missed his lengthy putt for par. Watson trickled his birdie putt a foot past the hole, took his time on the very short par putt, then made it for the victory. The win took him to a world ranking of four, a career-high at the time.

==== Rest of 2012 ====
Following his Masters win, Watson began to struggle. He missed the cut at the Memorial Tournament and the U.S. Open. A week after the U.S. Open, he finished tied for second at the Travelers Championship. A month later, he played Open Championship, the third major of the year. While shooting a first round of −3 to tie him at third place, he never advanced much after that, finishing tied for 23rd place. In the final major of the year, the PGA Championship, Watson tied for 11th. He finished the year with one win, six top-5 finishes, seven top-10 finishes and three missed cuts.

=== 2013 ===
Watson began the season playing the Hyundai Tournament of Champions, where he finished tied for fourth place, and reached the quarterfinals in the WGC-Accenture Match Play Championship. In the subsequent World Golf Championship event, the WGC-Cadillac Championship, he began very strong with rounds of 66 and 69, but finished with rounds of 71 and 75 and tied for 18th place.

After finishing tied 14th place in the Arnold Palmer Invitational, he returned to the Masters as the defending champion. Never in contention in the tournament, he finished 50th after a final round of 77. Watson tied for 37th at The Players Championship. On the second major of the year, the U.S. Open, he finished with a solid 71 in the first round, just four shots off the lead, but a second round score of 76 left him out of contention, and he tied for 32nd. At the Travelers Championship he took the lead after a second round of 67, but in the final round, leading by one with three to play, he triple-bogeyed the par-3 16th and finished two shots back in 4th place.

Tying for 30th at the Greenbrier Classic, he then played in the third major of the year, The Open Championship. After two solid rounds of 70 and 73, he shot 77 in the third round, and tied for 32nd.

=== 2014 ===
At the Waste Management Phoenix Open, Watson held the lead for most of the tournament, but he finished runner-up to Kevin Stadler.

Watson earned his fifth career PGA Tour victory—and his first since the 2012 Masters—at the 2014 Northern Trust Open at Riviera Country Club. He shot back-to-back 64s over the weekend to defeat runner-up Dustin Johnson by two strokes. The victory raised him to 14 in the Official World Golf Ranking. He followed that win with two more strong finishes—a ninth-place tie in the WGC-Accenture Match Play Championship and a second-place tie in the WGC-Cadillac Championship. Those performances elevated him from 14 to 12 in the world ranking.

==== Second Masters win ====
Watson won the 2014 Masters by three shots, with a score of 280 (−8). He entered the final round tied for the lead with 20-year-old Masters rookie Jordan Spieth. Playing together in the final pairing, Spieth birdied the seventh hole for a two-stroke lead over Watson. However, the momentum turned on the par-5 eighth hole. Spieth had a birdie putt, but ended up three-putting for bogey while Watson birdied to pull into a first-place tie. Then, on the ninth hole, Watson birdied again while Spieth bogeyed, and the four-shot swing over two holes gave Watson a lead that he never relinquished in a win over Spieth and Jonas Blixt. With the win, Watson became the 17th player to win the Masters two or more times. The win moved him again to number four in the Official World Golf Ranking.

=== 2015 ===
Watson won the Travelers Championship to move him to third in the Official World Golf Ranking. He garnered his second victory in 2015 by winning the unofficial Hero World Challenge in the Bahamas, besting fellow American Patrick Reed by three strokes.

=== 2016 ===
Prior to the Waste Management Phoenix Open in early February, Watson caused a bit of controversy after publicly admitting his dislike for the course, TPC Scottsdale. As a result, he was jeered by fans for the majority of the tournament, later criticizing the media for "turning his words around". Two weeks later though, he returned to the winner's circle after winning the Northern Trust Open at Riviera for a second time in three years, seeing off the challenge of Adam Scott and Jason Kokrak to win by one shot on 15-under-par.

=== 2017 ===
Watson did not chalk a win during the 2017 season, and missed the cut at three of the year's four majors (his only cut a T27 at The Open Championship). He had five top-10 finishes with more than $1.3 million in tour earnings.

=== 2018 ===
The 2018 season started with a T7 at the QBE Shootout in December 2017 marking the best of his first six starts. Watson returned to the winner's circle with a 12-under finish at the Genesis Open in February, his third victory at this tournament (2014, 2016), all at Riviera. His trifecta at the Genesis (previously known as the Los Angeles Open, Northern Trust Open, and Nissan Open) makes him only the fifth to win this long-standing event at least three times, along with Ben Hogan, Arnold Palmer, Lloyd Mangrum, and Macdonald Smith. On March 25, he gained his eleventh tour win at the WGC-Dell Match Play event in Austin, Texas, with a winner's share of $1.7 million. On June 24, 2018, he won again at the Travelers Championship winning $1.26 million at TPC River Highlands. This was his third career victory at the Travelers tournament (2010, 2015).

In September 2018, Watson qualified for the U.S. team participating in the 2018 Ryder Cup. Europe defeated the U.S. team 17 1/2 to 10 1/2. Watson went 1–2–0. He lost his singles match against Henrik Stenson.

=== 2022 ===
On July 29, 2022, Watson announced that he had joined LIV Golf as a non-playing team captain for the remainder of the season while he recovered from a torn meniscus, with the intention of returning to play from 2023. On August 10, he announced that he had resigned from the PGA Tour.

== Personal life ==
Watson's father, Gerry Sr., died on October 15, 2010, of throat cancer. His mother is Molly Marie Watson and he has a sister, Melinda Watson Conner. Watson was nicknamed by his father after the former professional American football player Bubba Smith.

Bubba Watson's wife, Angie (née Angela Ball), is a 6 ft 3 in (1.91 m) Canadian whom he met at Georgia while he was on the golf team and she was on the women's basketball team. They were married in September 2004. In 2009, she was diagnosed with an enlarged pituitary gland, which accounts for her height.

Unable to have a child naturally, various family issues, including the illness and death of Watson's father in 2010, kept them from attempting to adopt until 2011–12. In March 2012, one week after a potential adoption fell through at the last moment, Watson and his wife adopted a one-month-old baby boy named Caleb. In late 2014, the Watsons adopted a baby girl.

Watson is a member of the "Golf Boys", a boy band consisting of Watson, Ben Crane, Rickie Fowler, and Hunter Mahan. Their single "Oh Oh Oh" is currently on YouTube. The video was produced by Farmers Insurance Group. Farmers donates $1000 to charity for every 100,000 views the video gets.

In 2011, he made a humorous appearance in the song "Michael Jackson" by Christian hip hop artist Andy Mineo on the album Formerly Known. He was featured in the song "Ima Just Do It" by KB, another Christian hip hop artist, on the album Tomorrow We Live. His prototype Golf Cart Hovercraft, the BW1, YouTube video has earned more than 8 million views.

Watson is a committed Christian who speaks openly about the importance of faith in his life.

Watson purchased the mansion in the Isleworth community of Windermere, Florida, that was previously owned by Tiger Woods. In 2013, he was added to the list of Great Floridians by Governor Rick Scott.

Watson purchased a General Lee car from the television series The Dukes of Hazzard at auction for $110,000 in 2012. Following the Charleston church shooting in June 2015, display of the Confederate flag — which is featured on the car's roof — became the subject of renewed controversy. Watson responded by saying he would paint over the flag with the American flag.

In 2015, Watson moved to Pensacola, where he has become very involved in the community. Among other ventures, Watson opened an ice cream store, purchased a part ownership in the Pensacola Blue Wahoos Minor League Baseball team, and purchased a Chevrolet dealership in nearby Milton, Florida. Watson has made significant donations to the Studer Family Children's Hospital in Pensacola.

== Professional wins (15) ==
=== PGA Tour wins (12) ===
Legend
Major championships (2)
World Golf Championships (2)
Other PGA Tour (8)

No.	Date	Tournament	Winning score	To par	Margin of victory	Runner(s)-up
1	Jun 27, 2010	Travelers Championship	65-68-67-66=266	−14	Playoff	(United States) Corey Pavin, (United States) Scott Verplank
2	Jan 30, 2011	Farmers Insurance Open	71-65-69-67=272	−16	1 stroke	(United States) Phil Mickelson
3	May 1, 2011	Zurich Classic of New Orleans	66-68-70-69=273	−15	Playoff	(United States) Webb Simpson
4	Apr 8, 2012	Masters Tournament	69-71-70-68=278	−10	Playoff	(South Africa) Louis Oosthuizen
5	Feb 16, 2014	Northern Trust Open	70-71-64-64=269	−15	2 strokes	(United States) Dustin Johnson
6	Apr 13, 2014	Masters Tournament (2)	69-68-74-69=280	−8	3 strokes	(Sweden) Jonas Blixt, (United States) Jordan Spieth
7	Nov 9, 2014	WGC-HSBC Champions	71-67-69-70=277	−11	Playoff	(South Africa) Tim Clark
8	Jun 28, 2015	Travelers Championship (2)	62-67-68-67=264	−16	Playoff	(England) Paul Casey
9	Feb 21, 2016	Northern Trust Open (2)	66-68-67-68=269	−15	1 stroke	(United States) Jason Kokrak, (Australia) Adam Scott
10	Feb 18, 2018	Genesis Open (3)	68-70-65-69=272	−12	2 strokes	(United States) Tony Finau, (United States) Kevin Na
11	Mar 25, 2018	WGC-Dell Technologies Match Play	7 and 6			(United States) Kevin Kisner
12	Jun 24, 2018	Travelers Championship (3)	70-63-67-63=263	−17	3 strokes	(England) Paul Casey, (United States) Stewart Cink, (United States) J. B. Holmes, (United States) Beau Hossler

PGA Tour playoff record (5–1)

No.	Year	Tournament	Opponent(s)	Result
1	2010	Travelers Championship	(United States) Corey Pavin, (United States) Scott Verplank	Won with par on second extra hole Pavin eliminated by par on first hole
2	2010	PGA Championship	(Germany) Martin Kaymer	Lost three-hole aggregate playoff; Kaymer: E (4-2-5=11), Watson: +1 (3-3-6=12)
3	2011	Zurich Classic of New Orleans	(United States) Webb Simpson	Won with birdie on second extra hole
4	2012	Masters Tournament	(South Africa) Louis Oosthuizen	Won with par on second extra hole
5	2014	WGC-HSBC Champions	(South Africa) Tim Clark	Won with birdie on first extra hole
6	2015	Travelers Championship	(England) Paul Casey	Won with birdie on second extra hole

=== NGA Hooters Tour wins (1) ===
No.	Date	Tournament	Winning score	To par	Margin of victory	Runner-up
1	Mar 14, 2004	Michelob Ultra Orange Park Open	67-68-64-66=265	−23	4 strokes	(United States) Will MacKenzie

=== Other wins (2) ===
No.	Date	Tournament	Winning score	To par	Margin of victory	Runner(s)-up
1	Jun 24, 2008	CVS Caremark Charity Classic (with (Colombia) Camilo Villegas)	61-34=95*	−15	Playoff	(United States) Billy Andrade and (United States) Davis Love III, (United States) Paul Goydos and (United States) Tim Herron, (United States) Rocco Mediate and (United States) Brandt Snedeker
2	Dec 6, 2015	Hero World Challenge	67-67-63-66=263	−25	3 strokes	(United States) Patrick Reed

*Note: The 2008 CVS Caremark Charity Classic was stopped after 28 holes due to heavy rain.

Other playoff record (1–1)

No.	Year	Tournament	Opponent(s)	Result
1	2008	CVS Caremark Charity Classic (with (Colombia) Camilo Villegas)	(United States) Billy Andrade and (United States) Davis Love III, (United States) Paul Goydos and (United States) Tim Herron, (United States) Rocco Mediate and (United States) Brandt Snedeker	Won by 1 stroke in three-hole aggregate playoff
2	2014	PGA Grand Slam of Golf	(Germany) Martin Kaymer	Lost to birdie on first extra hole

== Playoff record ==
PGA Tour of Australasia playoff record (0–1)

No.	Year	Tournament	Opponent	Result
1	2005	MasterCard Masters	(Australia) Robert Allenby	Lost to par on first extra hole

Nationwide Tour playoff record (0–1)

No.	Year	Tournament	Opponents	Result
1	2004	Lake Erie Charity Classic	(New Zealand) Michael Long, (United States) Kevin Stadler	Stadler won with par on fourth extra hole Long eliminated by par on first hole

== Major championships ==
=== Wins (2) ===
Year	Championship	54 holes	Winning score	Margin	Runner(s)-up
2012	Masters Tournament	3 shot deficit	−10 (69-71-70-68=278)	Playoff^{1}	(South Africa) Louis Oosthuizen
2014	Masters Tournament (2)	Tied for lead	−8 (69-68-74-69=280)	3 strokes	(Sweden) Jonas Blixt, (United States) Jordan Spieth

^{1}Defeated Louis Oosthuizen in a sudden-death playoff: Watson (4-4), Oosthuizen (4-5).

=== Results timeline ===
Results not in chronological order in 2020.

Tournament	2004	2005	2006	2007	2008	2009
Masters Tournament					T20	42
U.S. Open	CUT			T5	CUT	T18
The Open Championship						CUT
PGA Championship				CUT	70	CUT

Tournament	2010	2011	2012	2013	2014	2015	2016	2017	2018
Masters Tournament		T38	1	T50	1	T38	T37	CUT	T5
U.S. Open		T63	CUT	T32	CUT	CUT	T51	CUT	CUT
The Open Championship	CUT	T30	T23	T32	CUT	CUT	T39	T27	CUT
PGA Championship	2	T26	T11	CUT	T64	T21	T60	CUT	CUT

Tournament	2019	2020	2021	2022	2023	2024	2025	2026
Masters Tournament	T12	57	T26	T39	CUT	CUT	T14	CUT
PGA Championship	CUT	T71	80	T30				
U.S. Open	CUT	T31	T50					
The Open Championship	T51	NT						

Win
Top 10
Did not play

CUT = missed the half-way cut
T = tied
NT = No tournament due to COVID-19 pandemic

=== Summary ===
Tournament	Wins	2nd	3rd	Top-5	Top-10	Top-25	Events	Cuts made
Masters Tournament	2	0	0	3	3	6	18	14
PGA Championship	0	1	0	1	1	3	16	10
U.S. Open	0	0	0	1	1	2	15	7
The Open Championship	0	0	0	0	0	1	11	6
Totals	2	1	0	5	5	12	60	37

- Most consecutive cuts made – 9 (2019 Open – 2022 PGA)
- Longest streak of top-10s – 1 (five times)

== Results in The Players Championship ==
Tournament	2007	2008	2009
The Players Championship	CUT	CUT	T37

Tournament	2010	2011	2012	2013	2014	2015	2016	2017	2018	2019
The Players Championship	CUT	T45		T37	T48	T42	T43	CUT	T57	T56

Tournament	2020	2021	2022
The Players Championship	C	CUT	T68

Did not play

CUT = missed the halfway cut
"T" indicates a tie for a place
C = Canceled after the first round due to the COVID-19 pandemic

== World Golf Championships ==
=== Wins (2) ===
Year	Championship	54 holes	Winning score	Margin	Runner-up
2014	WGC-HSBC Champions	3 shot deficit	−11 (71-67-69-70=277)	Playoff	(South Africa) Tim Clark
2018	WGC-Dell Technologies Match Play	n/a	7 and 6		(United States) Kevin Kisner

=== Results timeline ===
Results not in chronological order before 2015.

Tournament	2009	2010	2011	2012	2013	2014	2015	2016	2017	2018	2019	2020	2021	2022
Championship	72			2	T18	T2	3	2	T38	T9	T27	T18	T54	
Match Play			4	R32	R16	R16	T17	T28	R16	1	T40	NT^{1}	R16	T26
Invitational		T22	T21	T19	T27	T37	2	T14	T17	T31	T9	T25		
Champions				33	T8	1	T35	T54			T28	NT^{1}	NT^{1}	NT^{1}

^{1}Cancelled due to COVID-19 pandemic

Win
Top 10
Did not play

QF, R16, R32, R64 = Round in which player lost in match play
NT = no tournament
"T" = tied
Note that the Championship and Invitational were discontinued from 2022.

== PGA Tour career summary ==
Season	Starts	Cuts made	Wins (Majors)	2nd	3rd	Top-10	Top-25	Best finish	Earnings ($)	Money list rank
2002	1	0	0	0	0	0	0	CUT	0	n/a
2004	1	0	0	0	0	0	0	CUT	0	n/a
2006	27	15	0	0	1	3	6	T3	1,019,264	90
2007	26	14	0	1	0	5	9	T2	1,654,807	55
2008	29	19	0	1	0	3	7	T2	1,533,523	58
2009	24	13	0	1	0	2	9	T2	1,430,244	60
2010	22	16	1	2	1	4	8	1	3,198,998	15
2011	22	19	2	0	0	3	8	1	3,477,811	16
2012	19	16	1 (1)	2	0	7	16	1	4,644,997	5
2013	21	18	0	0	0	3	10	4/T4	1,759,276	44
2014	21	18	2 (1)	3	1	8	11	1	6,336,978	2
2015	19	17	2	3	2	10	14	1	6,876,797	3
2016	19	18	1	1	0	4	9	1	3,492,842	18
2017	22	14	0	0	0	4	6	T5	1,223,129	91
2018	24	19	3	0	0	6	8	1	5,793,748	6
2019	19	14	0	0	0	3	6	1	1,558,014	71
2020	20	13	0	0	1	3	7	T3	1,565,323	53
2021	22	17	0	0	0	5	9	T4	1,873,381	69
2022	9	6	0	0	0	1	2	T4	513,538	-
2023	1	0	0	0	0	0	0	CUT	-	-
Career*	368	266	12 (2)	14	6	74	145	1	48,049,778	20

* As of the 2023 season

== U.S. national team appearances ==
Professional

- Wendy's 3-Tour Challenge (representing PGA Tour): 2007, 2009, 2010 (winners)
- Ryder Cup: 2010, 2012, 2014, 2018
- Presidents Cup: 2011 (winners), 2015 (winners)

== See also ==
- 2005 Nationwide Tour graduates
