= Robert Garrigus =

American professional golfer

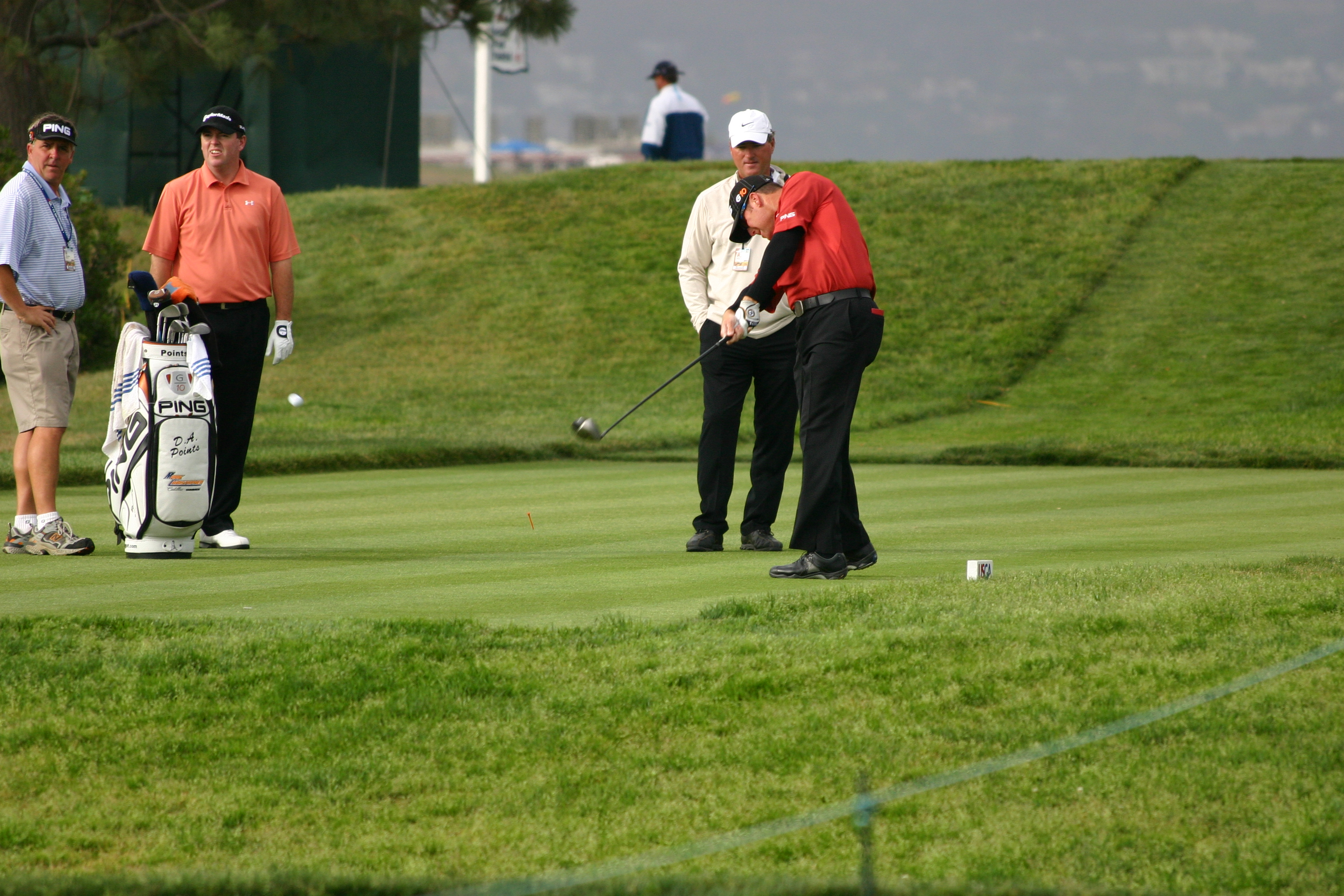
- Garrigus at the 2008 U.S. Open

Personal information
- Full name: Robert Ira Garrigus
- Nicknames: Gorillagus, Rocket Rob
- Nationality: United States
- Born: November 11, 1977 (age 48) Nampa, Idaho, U.S.
- Height: 5 ft 11 in (1.80 m)
- Weight: 175 lb (79 kg; 12.5 st)

Career
- Sport: Golf
- College: Scottsdale Community College
- Turned professional: 1997
- Current tours: PGA Tour (past champion status)
- Former tour: Nationwide Tour
- Professional wins: 1
- Highest ranking: 35 (April 21, 2013)

Number of wins by tour
- PGA Tour: 1

Best results in major championships
- Masters Tournament: T38: 2013
- PGA Championship: T21: 2012
- U.S. Open: T3: 2011
- The Open Championship: CUT: 2011, 2013

Robert Ira Garrigus (born November 11, 1977) is an American professional golfer who is currently a member of the PGA Tour. He won the 2010 Children's Miracle Network Classic, the last event of the PGA Tour season, to guarantee exempt status on the PGA Tour through the end of the 2012 season.

Garrigus is one of the longest drivers in the golfing world, with an average drive of 310.5 yards in 2007. He is one of the few players who can hit a ball over 350 yards. He led the PGA Tour in driving distance in both the 2009 and 2010 seasons with average distances of 312 and 315 yards, respectively. He is also noted for using a putter only 28.5 inches in length, about six inches shorter than a standard putter. However, in 2012, at the Humana Challenge, he gave up the shorter putter for a 46" putter.

== Early life ==
In 1977, Garrigus was born in Nampa, Idaho. He spent most of his childhood in Banks, Oregon. Garrigus attended Forest Grove High School, Crescent Valley High School in Corvallis, Oregon, and Centennial High School in Gresham, Oregon. In 1995, Garrigus finished first at the Valley League District Championships and later helped Crescent Valley High School to a 4A state championship by finishing T-9.

Later in 1995, Garrigus attended Scottsdale Community College in Scottsdale, Arizona.

== Professional career ==
In 1997, Garrigus turned professional. He played on the NGA Hooters Tour and the Gateway Tour from 1997–1999. He played on the Buy.com Tour for the first time in 2000. He returned in 2002, 2004, and 2005. He finished tied for 9th in Q-School in 2005 to earn his PGA Tour card for the first time.

=== 2010 season ===
==== Memphis collapse ====
At the 2010 St. Jude Classic in Memphis, Tennessee, Garrigus, playing in the final group, had a three-shot lead going into the 72nd hole, a long par four. He pulled his tee shot into the water hazard which flanks the hole's left side. After taking a penalty drop a long way back, he hit his third shot straight left, caught a tree left of the hazard and fell straight down. He punched out to the fairway and hit his fifth shot onto the green, within 35 feet of the hole. He two-putted from there, resulting in a triple bogey 7. A three-way sudden-death playoff with Lee Westwood and Robert Karlsson then began. On the first hole they played, the 18th, Garrigus's drive carried too far and came to rest against the trunk of a tree, right of the fairway. He chipped out and hit his third shot to 12 feet. His par putt lipped out and he made bogey. Karlsson and Westwood both made par, eliminating Garrigus, who finished tied for second place. The playoff was eventually won by Westwood, who birdied the fourth sudden-death hole.

==== Orlando victory ====
Needing a high finish to earn his tour card for 2011, he entered the final day 13 under par and five shots behind the leader Roland Thatcher and one behind first-round leader Chris Stroud at the Children's Miracle Network Classic in suburban Orlando, Florida. Thatcher had reached 21-under in his third round, before a double bogey, bogey finish. After five birdies in his first seven holes, Garrigus caught Thatcher, who had parred his first seven holes.. Thatcher extended his lead with three birdies around the turn, before a bogey on twelve, as Garrigus in the group in front birdied thirteen, moving the pair level again. After Thatcher bogeyed sixteen, Garrigus held the solo lead in a tournament for the first time since Memphis. A further two-shot swing on the 17th, where Garrigus made birdie-3 to Thatcher's bogey-5, followed by a final-hole par, sealed his first professional win, by three strokes. With the victory, Garrigus earned an exemption on the PGA Tour through the end of the 2012 season. Prior to the tournament, Garrigus was 179th on the Tour, which would have meant a loss of his Tour card. Thatcher finished second.

==== On overcoming substance abuse ====
Immediately after finishing his final round in Orlando, Garrigus spoke openly in a television interview on the Golf Channel, about his triumph over substance abuse, his subsequent improved play, and his joy at closing out the season with a tournament victory, which made up for his struggles at the Memphis tournament earlier in the season.

In an article that appeared in Golf Digest in July 2011, Garrigus admitted that during the 2002 season, he and several other golfers on the Web.com Tour (then the Buy.com Tour) smoked marijuana during events:

"Oh yeah, there were plenty of guys on the Nationwide Tour who smoked in the middle of the round. We always talked about it. You could go in the Porta John and take your drags."

In 2003, he entered a rehabilitation center near San Diego for a 45-day program. His newfound sobriety was almost immediately tested. Before entering rehab, he had left money for his roommate to keep the house and pay bills. The roommate instead used it for drugs and gambling; when Garrigus returned the night before he was to play in a sectional qualifier for the U.S. Open, he found the locks changed and the electricity disconnected. The roommate had left town to avoid gambling debts, leaving behind a substantial quantity of marijuana and a note reading, "Hope rehab was great. Have fun." As Garrigus would say,

"I stood there for a minute, and then I grabbed the weed and threw it in the garbage. Then I took the refrigerator and threw it out with the chicken, everything. I called the electric company to get them to turn on the power. When I wake up the next morning, I didn't realize until I get to the golf course that my roommate had been using my putter. So I race back to the house at 140 miles per hour, get my putter, race back just in time for my tee time. I have no warm-up, no caddie, and my clubs are on a pull cart. I shoot 70 and miss by two shots. I told myself that wasn't too bad after 45 days without hitting a ball. I knew then I was going to be OK."

=== 2011 season ===
In June 2011, Garrigus made his first ever cut in a major at the U.S. Open at Congressional Country Club, posting all four rounds under par on the way to a tied third-place finish. This result ensured Garrigus of an invitation to the 2012 U.S. Open and the Masters. His 2011 season ended with over $1.5 million in earnings that included a playoff loss to Jonathan Byrd at the season-opening Hyundai Tournament of Champions.

Garrigus took part in the Long Drive Contest for charity at the Hyundai Tournament of Champions alongside Bubba Watson and Dustin Johnson and finished third with a longest drive of 365 yards.

=== 2016-2017 Season ===
Garrigus got off to a strong start in the 2016-2017 PGA Tour Season with 8 out of 12 made cuts including 3 top-25 finishes. It looked like it would be smooth sailing for Garrigus as he was likely to retain his card for the 2017-2018 season. He then proceeded to miss seven straight cuts only succeeding at breaking par in one of them. He then made two cuts before being disqualified at the John Deere Classic after signing for an incorrect scorecard after the third round. Garrigus was doing quite well in the tournament, as he was 7-under through the first two rounds. Due to the disqualification, Garrigus slipped to 137th on the FedEx Cup points list. Despite all of that, Garrigus didn't let it stop him. He then fired three straight top tens at the Barbasol Championship (10th), the RBC Canadian Open (T-5), and the Barracuda Championship (T-6). He climbed to 96th in the FedEx Cup Points List before finishing the season 109th. This marked the 12th straight season Garrigus was able to retain his card for the following season.

=== 2017-2018 Season ===
On February 5th, 2018, in the second round of the Waste Management Phoenix Open at TPC Scottsdale, Garrigus nearly became the second PGA Tour Professional to score a hole in one on a par 4. On the 317-yard par 4 17th, Garrigus hit a 4-wood that landed in front of the green and got a strong bounce right at the hole. Shortly after his ball started rolling after bouncing three times, it struck the very center of the flagstick and finished just one inch from the hole. He described the shot as being, "the second best shot I've ever hit in all my years on tour after the par putt I made at the 18th hole on Sunday at the 2011 U.S. Open. I couldn't believe it didn't fall." He finished T-52 in the tournament.

With two tournaments remaining in the season, Garrigus' 12-year streak of retaining his card came to an end. He missed the cut at both the Barracuda Championship and the Wyndham Championship and finished 131st in the FedEx Cup Standings.

=== 2019 season ===
In March 2019, Garrigus was suspended by the PGA Tour for three months after testing positive for marijuana.

=== 2021 Season ===
In July of 2021, Garrigus made an albatross on the par 5 5th hole at the Barbasol Championship at Keene Trace Golf Club in Nicholasville, Kentucky. After scoring an eagle 3 on that same hole on both Saturday and Sunday, he set a PGA Tour Record for the most strokes under par on an individual hole in a PGA Tour Tournament at 8-under.

=== 2024 Season ===
In February of 2024, Garrigus won a PGA Tour Monday Qualifier which earned him a spot in the Cognizant Classic in The Palm Beaches with a score of 65 (7-under).

== Personal life ==
Garrigus currently lives in Chandler, Arizona, with his fiancé and two sons from a previous marriage.

His father, Thomas, won a silver medal in trap shooting at the 1968 Summer Olympics in Mexico City.

== Professional wins (1) ==
=== PGA Tour wins (1) ===
No.	Date	Tournament	Winning score	Margin of victory	Runner-up
1	Nov 14, 2010	Children's Miracle Network Classic	−21 (68-65-70-64=267)	3 strokes	(United States) Roland Thatcher

PGA Tour playoff record (0–3)

No.	Year	Tournament	Opponent(s)	Result
1	2010	St. Jude Classic	(Sweden) Robert Karlsson, (England) Lee Westwood	Westwood won with birdie on fourth extra hole Garrigus eliminated by par on first hole
2	2011	Hyundai Tournament of Champions	(United States) Jonathan Byrd	Lost to par on second extra hole
3	2012	Transitions Championship	(South Korea) Bae Sang-moon, (England) Luke Donald, (United States) Jim Furyk	Donald won with birdie on first extra hole

== Results in major championships ==
Tournament	2004	2005	2006	2007	2008	2009	2010	2011	2012	2013
Masters Tournament									CUT	T38
U.S. Open	CUT				CUT			T3	CUT	WD
The Open Championship								CUT		CUT
PGA Championship								T62	T21	T25

Top 10
Did not play

CUT = missed the half-way cut
WD = withdrew
"T" = tied

=== Summary ===
Tournament	Wins	2nd	3rd	Top-5	Top-10	Top-25	Events	Cuts made
Masters Tournament	0	0	0	0	0	0	2	1
U.S. Open	0	0	1	1	1	1	5	1
The Open Championship	0	0	0	0	0	0	2	0
PGA Championship	0	0	0	0	0	2	3	3
Totals	0	0	1	1	1	3	12	5

- Most consecutive cuts made – 2 (2012 PGA – 2013 Masters)
- Longest streak of top-10s – 1

== Results in The Players Championship ==
Tournament	2007	2008	2009	2010	2011	2012	2013	2014	2015	2016	2017	2018
The Players Championship	CUT	CUT			73	CUT	CUT	CUT	CUT		CUT	CUT

Did not play

CUT = missed the halfway cut
"T" indicates a tie for a place

== Results in World Golf Championships ==
Tournament	2012	2013
Match Play		QF
Championship		65
Invitational		
Champions	T51	

Top 10
Did not play

QF, R16, R32, R64 = Round in which player lost in match play
"T" = Tied

== See also ==
- 2005 PGA Tour Qualifying School graduates
- 2006 PGA Tour Qualifying School graduates
- 2008 PGA Tour Qualifying School graduates
- 2015 Web.com Tour Finals graduates
