= Golf at the 2015 Pan American Games – Men's individual =

Golf – Men's individual at the 2015 Pan American Games
- Venue: Angus Glen Golf Club
- Dates: July 16–19
- Competitors: 32 from 19 nations
- Winning score: 275 (−13)

Medalists
Gold medal	Marcelo Rozo	Colombia
Silver medal	Tommy Cocha	Argentina
Bronze medal	Felipe Aguilar	Chile

The men's individual competition of the Golf events at the 2015 Pan American Games was held between July 16 and 19 at the Angus Glen Golf Club in Markham, Ontario.

== Schedule ==
All times are Eastern Daylight Time (UTC-4).

Date	Time	Round
July 16, 2015	8:00	Round 1
July 17, 2015	10:12	Round 2
July 18, 2015	8:00	Round 3
July 19, 2015	9:04	Round 4

== Results ==
The final results were:

Rank	Name	Nation	Round 1	Round 2	Round 3	Round 4	Total
1st place, gold medalist(s)	Marcelo Rozo	Colombia	68	76	63	68	275 (−13)
2nd place, silver medalist(s)	Tommy Cocha	Argentina	73	69	67	67	276 (−12)
3rd place, bronze medalist(s)	Felipe Aguilar	Chile	69	67	69	71	276 (−12)
4	Lee McCoy	United States	70	68	71	69	278 (−10)
5	Austin Connelly	Canada	70	69	70	71	280 (−8)
6	Beau Hossler	United States	70	74	68	69	281 (−7)
7	Alejandro Tosti	Argentina	65	79	68	72	284 (−4)
T8	Adilson da Silva	Brazil	71	70	73	72	286 (−2)
T8	Andre Tourinho	Brazil	70	74	70	72	286 (−2)
T8	Jorge García	Venezuela	70	74	68	74	286 (−2)
11	Mark Tullo	Chile	74	69	74	70	287 (−1)
12	Luis Barco	Peru	70	68	72	78	288 (E)
T13	Juan Miguel Heredia	Ecuador	73	76	71	70	290 (+2)
T13	José Luis Montaño	Bolivia	70	72	75	73	290 (+2)
15	Garrett Rank	Canada	79	72	72	70	293 (+5)
16	Juan Álvarez	Uruguay	82	73	68	71	294 (+6)
17	Gustavo Morantes	Venezuela	71	75	74	75	295 (+7)
T18	Daniel Gurtner	Guatemala	76	76	71	73	296 (+8)
T18	Felipe Strobach	Peru	77	73	70	76	296 (+8)
T20	Mateo Gómez	Colombia	75	71	75	76	297 (+9)
T20	Erick Juan Morales	Puerto Rico	71	76	74	76	297 (+9)
22	James Johnson	Barbados	79	76	72	71	298 (+10)
23	Luis Gerardo Garza	Mexico	79	73	70	77	299 (+11)
24	Talin Rajendranath	Trinidad and Tobago	74	78	75	74	301 (+13)
T25	Sachin Kumar	Trinidad and Tobago	78	76	73	75	302 (+14)
T25	José Miranda	Ecuador	75	74	74	79	302 (+14)
27	Álvaro Ortiz	Mexico	78	77	74	74	303 (+15)
28	Sebastian Barnoya	Guatemala	77	79	74	75	305 (+17)
29	George Scanlon	Bolivia	84	74	69	79	306 (+18)
30	Ian Facey	Jamaica	77	80	76	81	314 (+26)
T31	José Méndez	Costa Rica	78	87	78	73	316 (+28)
T31	Gustavo Silvero	Paraguay	80	83	79	74	316 (+28)
