= Golf at the 2015 Pan American Games =

- Golf pictogram for the games
- Venue: Angus Glen Golf Club
- Dates: July 16–19
- No. of events: 3 (1 men, 1 women, 1 mixed)
- Competitors: 63 from 20 nations

Golf competitions at the 2015 Pan American Games in Toronto was held from July 16 to 19 at the Angus Glen Golf Club in Markham. A total three golf events were held: a singles event for men and women, along with a mixed team event. Golf made its debut at the Pan American Games, after the sport was added to the 2016 Olympics in Rio de Janeiro, Brazil.

Colombia swept all three gold medals.

== Venue ==
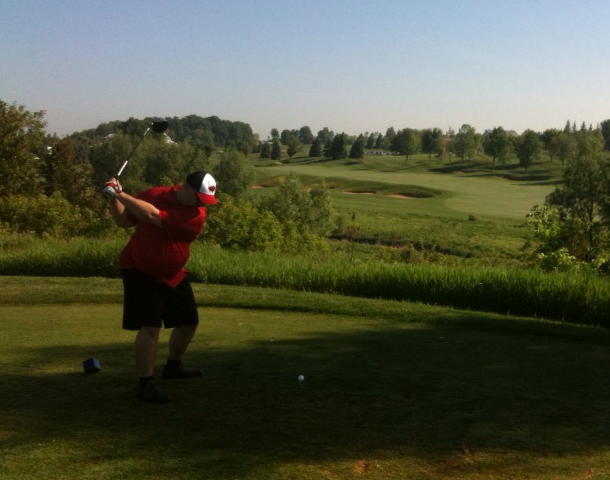
The Angus Glen Golf Club, in Markham, was the venue for the golf competitions.

The competitions took place at the Angus Glen Golf Club's south course located in the city of Markham, about 35 kilometres from the athletes village. The course had a capacity of 2,000 people.

== Competition schedule ==
The following is the competition schedule for the golf competitions:

| R1 | Round 1 | R2 | Round 2 | R3 | Round 3 | R4 | Round 4/Final |

| Event↓/Date → | Thu 16 | Fri 17 | Sat 18 | Sun 19 |
|---|---|---|---|---|
| Men's individual | R1 | R2 | R3 | R4 |
| Women's individual | R1 | R2 | R3 | R4 |
| Mixed team | R1 | R2 | R3 | R4 |

== Medal table ==
| Rank | Nation | Gold | Silver | Bronze | Total |
|---|---|---|---|---|---|
| 1 | Colombia | 3 | 0 | 0 | 3 |
| 2 | United States | 0 | 2 | 0 | 2 |
| 3 | Argentina | 0 | 1 | 1 | 2 |
| 4 | Chile | 0 | 0 | 1 | 1 |
| 4 | Paraguay | 0 | 0 | 1 | 1 |
| Totals (5 entries) | | 3 | 3 | 3 | 9 |

== Medalists ==
| Event | Gold | Silver | Bronze |
|---|---|---|---|
| Men's individual | Marcelo Rozo; Colombia | Tomás Cocha; Argentina | Felipe Aguilar; Chile |
| Women's individual | Mariajo Uribe; Colombia | Andrea Lee; United States | Julieta Granada; Paraguay |
| Mixed team | Colombia; Mateo Gómez; Paola Moreno; Marcelo Rozo; Mariajo Uribe | United States; Kristen Gillman; Beau Hossler; Andrea Lee; Lee McCoy | Argentina; Tomás Cocha; Manuela Carbajo Re; Delfina Acosta; Alejandro Tosti |

== Participating nations ==
A total of 20 countries had qualified athletes. The number of athletes a nation entered is in parentheses beside the name of the country.

- Argentina (4)
- Barbados (1)
- Bolivia (4)
- Brazil (4)
- Canada (3)
- Chile (4)
- Colombia (4)
- Costa Rica (1)
- Ecuador (4)
- Guatemala (4)
- Jamaica (1)
- Mexico (4)
- Paraguay (3)
- Peru (4)
- Puerto Rico (2)
- Trinidad and Tobago (4)
- United States (4)
- Uruguay (3)
- Venezuela (4)
- Virgin Islands (1)

== Qualification ==
A total of 64 athletes (32 men and 32 women) qualified to compete at the games. A nation could enter a maximum of two golfers per gender. As host nation, Canada automatically qualified a full team of four golfers. All other athletes qualified through the Official World Golf Ranking and Women's World Golf Rankings (and if necessary) the World Amateur Golf Ranking as of April 28, 2015 and April 30, 2015, respectively. All nations qualifying in the men's and women's singles events also qualified for the mixed team event.

Brooke Henderson, one of Canada's women entries, withdrew several weeks prior to the Games and was not replaced, leaving 31 women and 63 total competitors.

Of the 32 men entered, five were professionals: Tommy Cocha (Argentina), Adilson da Silva (Brazil), Felipe Aguilar and Mark Tullo (Chile), Marcelo Rozo (Colombia). For the women, six were professionals: Lorie Kane (Canada), Mariajo Uribe and Paola Moreno (Colombia), Margarita Ramos (Mexico), Julieta Granada (Paraguay), Veronica Felibert (Venezuela).

== See also ==
- Golf at the 2016 Summer Olympics
