= Golf at the 2015 Pan American Games – Women's individual =

Golf – Women's individual at the 2015 Pan American Games
- Venue: Angus Glen Golf Club
- Dates: July 16–19
- Competitors: 31 from 17 nations
- Winning score: 279 (−9)

Medalists
Gold medal	Mariajo Uribe	Colombia
Silver medal	Andrea Lee	United States
Bronze medal	Julieta Granada	Paraguay

The women's individual competition of the Golf events at the 2015 Pan American Games was held between July 16 and 19 at the Angus Glen Golf Club in Markham, Ontario.

== Schedule ==
All times are Eastern Standard Time (UTC-3).

Date	Time	Round
July 16	10:12	Round 1
July 17	8:00	Round 2
July 18	10:12	Round 3
July 19	8:00	Round 4

== Results ==
The final results were:

Rank	Name	Nation	Round 1	Round 2	Round 3	Round 4	Total
1st place, gold medalist(s)	Mariajo Uribe	Colombia	69	70	70	70	279 (−9)
2nd place, silver medalist(s)	Andrea Lee	United States	69	68	70	74	281 (−7)
3rd place, bronze medalist(s)	Julieta Granada	Paraguay	68	71	72	72	283 (−5)
4	Marijosse Navarro	Mexico	73	68	73	71	285 (−3)
5	Paola Moreno	Colombia	73	71	71	73	288 (E)
6	Kristen Gillman	United States	75	75	71	70	291 (+3)
7	Lucía Gutierrez	Peru	74	70	76	75	295 (+7)
8	Margarita Ramos	Mexico	77	75	75	69	296 (+8)
9	Daniela Darquea	Ecuador	71	73	78	76	298 (+10)
10	Milagros Chaves	Paraguay	83	73	73	73	302 (+14)
T11	Amira Alexander	Virgin Islands	79	77	75	72	303 (+15)
T11	Lucia Polo	Guatemala	77	78	76	72	303 (+15)
13	Veronica Felibert	Venezuela	79	78	74	73	304 (+16)
14	Manuela Carbajo Re	Argentina	74	76	74	81	305 (+17)
15	Delfina Acosta	Argentina	80	73	76	77	306 (+18)
T16	Ariadna Fonseca	Venezuela	82	75	74	76	307 (+19)
T16	Maria Torres	Puerto Rico	77	75	79	76	307 (+19)
18	Simone de Souza	Peru	82	80	74	74	310 (+22)
T19	Lorie Kane	Canada	79	83	75	74	311 (+23)
T19	Coralia Arias	Ecuador	82	78	77	74	311 (+23)
21	Pilar Echeverria	Guatemala	78	83	76	78	315 (+27)
T22	Natalia Pérez	Bolivia	77	83	79	79	318 (+30)
T22	Monifa Sealy	Trinidad and Tobago	81	77	77	83	318 (+30)
24	Valentina Haupt	Chile	82	83	79	81	325 (+37)
25	Natalia Soria	Bolivia	84	80	86	79	329 (+41)
T26	Christina Ferreira	Trinidad and Tobago	84	85	79	83	330 (+42)
T26	Priscilla Schmid	Uruguay	79	87	80	84	330 (+42)
28	Clara Teixeira	Brazil	82	82	87	82	333 (+45)
29	Manuela Barros	Uruguay	87	92	85	79	343 (+55)
30	Pilar Schele	Chile	90	90	84	82	346 (+58)
DQ	Luiza Altmann	Brazil	DQ	77	76	76	DQ
