= Chesson Hadley =

American professional golfer (born 1987)

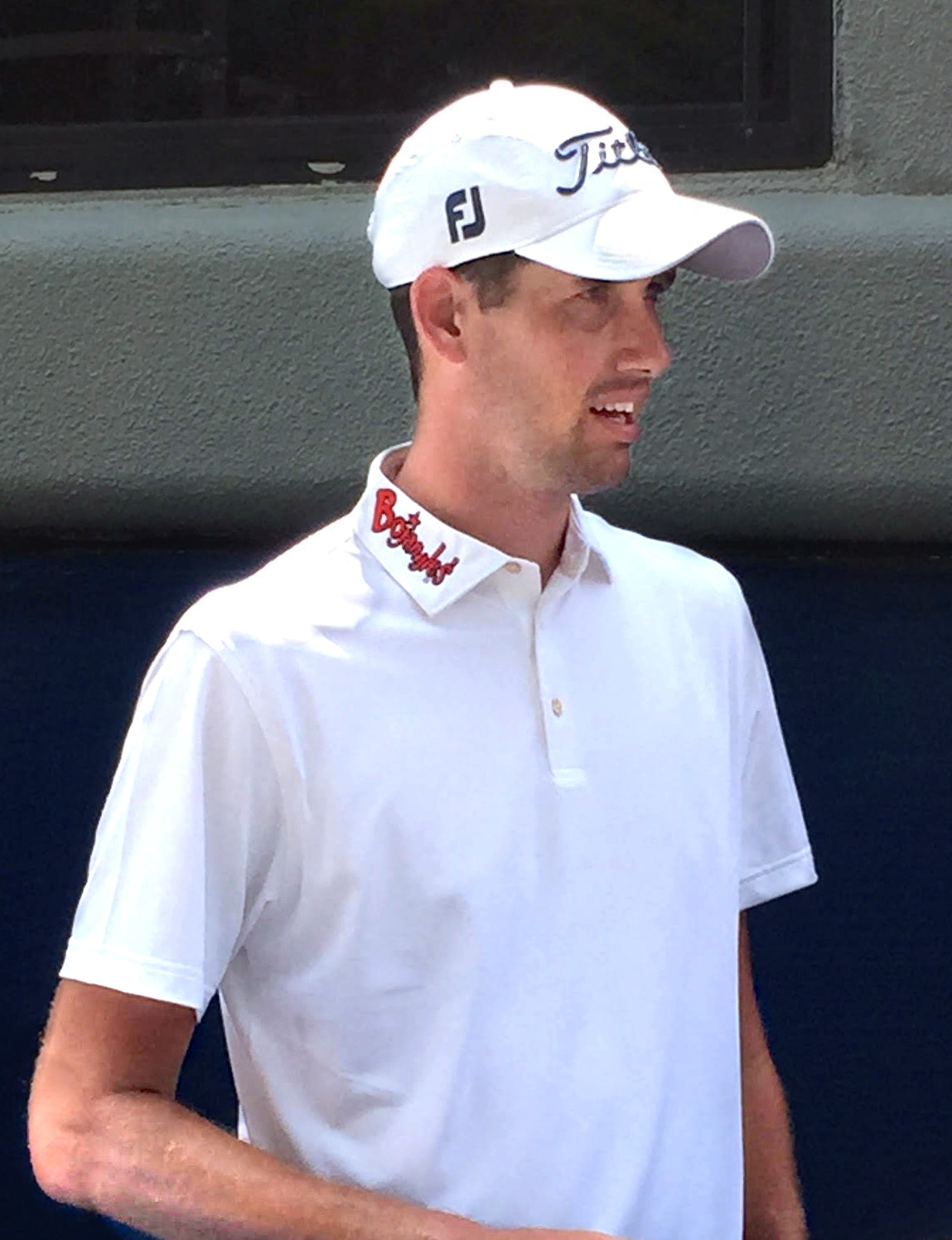
- Hadley in 2018

Personal information
- Full name: Chesson Tyler Hadley
- Nationality: United States
- Born: July 5, 1987 (age 39) Raleigh, North Carolina, U.S.
- Height: 6 ft 4 in (1.93 m)
- Weight: 165 lb (75 kg; 11.8 st)
- Spouse: Amanda (m. 2010)
- Children: 3

Career
- Sport: Golf
- College: Georgia Tech
- Turned professional: 2010
- Current tour: PGA Tour
- Former tours: Web.com Tour eGolf Professional Tour
- Professional wins: 6
- Highest ranking: 56 (March 23, 2014)

Number of wins by tour
- PGA Tour: 1
- Korn Ferry Tour: 4
- Other: 1

Best results in major championships
- Masters Tournament: DNP
- PGA Championship: T61: 2015
- U.S. Open: T9: 2019
- The Open Championship: CUT: 2014, 2018

Achievements and awards
- PGA Tour Rookie of the Year: 2013–14
- Web.com Tour Finals money list winner: 2017
- Web.com Tour Player of the Year: 2017

Chesson Tyler Hadley (born July 5, 1987) is an American professional golfer who plays on the PGA Tour.

== Amateur career ==
Hadley was born in Raleigh, North Carolina, on July 5, 1987, to Russell and Edna Ruth Hadley. He started playing golf at North Ridge Country Club and then for his high school, North Raleigh Christian Academy. He played college golf at Georgia Tech where he was a three-time All-American and won two events, including the 2010 Atlantic Coast Conference championship. He played on the 2008 Palmer Cup team.

== Professional career ==
Hadley turned professional in 2010. He played on the Web.com Tour in 2013 and won his first tour event in June at the Rex Hospital Open. He finished third on the 2013 Web.com Tour regular season money list to earn his 2014 PGA Tour card.

Hadley captured his first PGA Tour win on March 9, 2014 with a two-shot victory in the Puerto Rico Open played at the Trump International course. Hadley shot a tournament record 21-under and earned $630,000. He also earned a two-year tour exemption and spots in The Players Championship, PGA Championship, and Hyundai Tournament of Champions.

Hadley ranked 49th in the 2014 FedEx Cup Playoffs including finishing 9th at the Deutsche Bank Championship. He also won the PGA Tour Rookie of the Year.

Hadley lost his PGA Tour card at the end of the 2016 season and dropped back to the Web.com Tour. His third career win on that tour, in July 2017 at the LECOM Health Challenge, ensured his return to the PGA Tour. He picked up another win in September at the Albertsons Boise Open. He was the Web.com Tour Finals winner and the overall money winner and was voted Web.com Tour Player of the Year.

In June 2021, Hadley led the Palmetto Championship by four strokes heading into the final round. Hadley ended up bogeying his last three holes of the day to shoot 75 and lose by one stroke to Garrick Higgo. Hadley ended up in a six-way tie for second place. Hadley finished the season with the 125th and final fully exempt position in the FedEx Cup standings.

== Personal life ==
Hadley married wife Amanda on July 17, 2010; the couple has one son, Hughes, and one daughter, Hollins. Hadley is naturally left-handed but plays right-handed.

== Awards and honors ==
- In 2014, Hadley won PGA Tour Rookie of the Year.
- In 2017, Hadley won the Web.com Tour Player of the Year. He also won the Web.com Tour Finals money list.

== Professional wins (6) ==
=== PGA Tour wins (1) ===
| No. | Date | Tournament | Winning score | Margin of victory | Runner-up |
|---|---|---|---|---|---|
| 1 | Mar 9, 2014 | Puerto Rico Open | −21 (68-65-67-67=267) | 2 strokes | (New Zealand) Danny Lee |

=== Web.com Tour wins (4) ===
Legend
Finals events (2)
Other Web.com Tour (2)

| No. | Date | Tournament | Winning score | Margin of victory | Runner(s)-up |
|---|---|---|---|---|---|
| 1 | Jun 23, 2013 | Rex Hospital Open | −19 (63-69-69-64=265) | 2 strokes | (New Zealand) Danny Lee |
| 2 | Sep 29, 2013 | Web.com Tour Championship | −10 (65-66-70-69=270) | 2 strokes | (Canada) Brad Fritsch, (Australia) Scott Gardiner, (United States) John Peterson, (United States) Brendon Todd |
| 3 | Jul 9, 2017 | LECOM Health Challenge | −23 (69-67-64-65=265) | 1 stroke | (United States) Beau Hossler |
| 4 | Sep 17, 2017 | Albertsons Boise Open | −16 (67-68-68-65=268) | 1 stroke | (United States) Ted Potter Jr., (United States) Jonathan Randolph |

Web.com Tour playoff record (0–2)

| No. | Year | Tournament | Opponent(s) | Result |
|---|---|---|---|---|
| 1 | 2017 | Rex Hospital Open | (United States) Conrad Shindler | Lost to par on first extra hole |
| 2 | 2017 | DAP Championship | (United States) Nicholas Lindheim, (United States) Rob Oppenheim | Lindheim won with birdie on first extra hole |

=== eGolf Professional Tour wins (1) ===
| No. | Date | Tournament | Winning score | Margin of victory | Runners-up |
|---|---|---|---|---|---|
| 1 | Jul 21, 2012 | River Landing Open | −17 (65-68-67-71=271) | 4 strokes | (United States) David Robinson, (Argentina) Alan Wagner |

== Results in major championships ==
Results not in chronological order in 2020.

| Tournament | 2014 | 2015 | 2016 | 2017 | 2018 |
|---|---|---|---|---|---|
| Masters Tournament | | | | | |
| U.S. Open | | | | | CUT |
| The Open Championship | CUT | | | | CUT |
| PGA Championship | CUT | T61 | | | CUT |

| Tournament | 2019 | 2020 | 2021 | 2022 | 2023 | 2024 |
|---|---|---|---|---|---|---|
| Masters Tournament | | | | | | |
| PGA Championship | CUT | | | | | |
| U.S. Open | T9 | T51 | | | | CUT |
| The Open Championship | | NT | | | | |

Top 10
Did not play

CUT = missed the half-way cut
"T" indicates a tie for a place
NT = no tournament

== Results in The Players Championship ==
| Tournament | 2014 | 2015 | 2016 | 2017 | 2018 | 2019 | 2020 | 2021 | 2022 | 2023 | 2024 |
|---|---|---|---|---|---|---|---|---|---|---|---|
| The Players Championship | CUT | T24 | CUT | | T11 | CUT | C | | T63 | T44 | CUT |

Did not play

CUT = missed the halfway cut
"T" indicates a tie for a place
C = Canceled after the first round due to the COVID-19 pandemic

== U.S. national team appearances ==
Amateur

- Palmer Cup: 2008

== See also ==
- 2013 Web.com Tour Finals graduates
- 2017 Web.com Tour Finals graduates
- List of golfers with most Web.com Tour wins
