= Golf at the 2015 Pan American Games – Mixed team =

Mixed team at the 2015 Pan American Games
- Venue: Angus Glen Golf Club
- Dates: July 16–19
- Competitors: 59 from 16 nations
- Winning score: 549 (−27)

Medalists
Gold medal	Marcelo Rozo; Mateo Gómez; Paola Moreno; Mariajo Uribe	Colombia
Silver medal	Beau Hossler; Lee McCoy; Andrea Lee; Kristen Gillman	United States
Bronze medal	Tommy Cocha; Alejandro Tosti; Delfina Acosta; Manuela Carbajo Re	Argentina

The mixed team competition of the Golf events at the 2015 Pan American Games was held between July 16 and 19 at the Angus Glen Golf Club in Markham, Ontario.

== Schedule ==
All times are Eastern Standard Time (UTC-3).

Date	Time	Round
July 16, 2015	8:00	Round 1
July 17, 2015	10:12	Round 2
July 18, 2015	8:00	Round 3
July 19, 2015	9:04	Round 4

== Results ==
The final results were:

Rank	Nation	Name	Round 1	Round 2	Round 3	Round 4	Total
1st place, gold medalist(s)	Colombia	Marcelo Rozo (M); Mateo Gómez (M); Paola Moreno (W); Mariajo Uribe (W)	137; 68; 75; 73; 69	141; 76; 71; 71; 70	133; 63; 75; 71; 70	138; 68; 76; 73; 70	549 (−27)
2nd place, silver medalist(s)	United States	Beau Hossler (M); Lee McCoy (M); Andrea Lee (W); Kristen Gillman (W)	139; 70; 70; 69; 75	136; 74; 68; 68; 75	138; 68; 71; 70; 71	139; 69; 69; 74; 70	552 (−24)
3rd place, bronze medalist(s)	Argentina	Tommy Cocha (M); Alejandro Tosti (M); Delfina Acosta (W); Manuela Carbajo Re (W)	139; 73; 65; 80; 74	142; 69; 79; 73; 76	141; 67; 68; 76; 74	144; 67; 72; 77; 81	566 (−10)
4	Peru	Felipe Strobach (M); Luis Barco (M); Lucía Gutierrez (W); Simone de Souza (W)	144; 77; 70; 74; 82	138; 73; 68; 70; 80	144; 70; 72; 76; 74	150; 76; 78; 75; 74	576 (Even)
5	Mexico	Álvaro Ortiz (M); Luis Gerardo Garza (M); Margarita Ramos (W); Marijosse Navarro (W)	151; 78; 79; 77; 73	141; 77; 73; 75; 68	143; 74; 70; 75; 73	143; 74; 77; 69; 71	578 (+2)
6	Ecuador	José Miranda (M); Juan Miguel Heredia (M); Coralia Arias (W); Daniela Darquea (W)	144; 75; 73; 82; 71	147; 74; 76; 78; 73	148; 74; 71; 77; 78	144; 79; 70; 74; 76	583 (+7)
7	Venezuela	Jorge García (M); Gustavo Morantes (M); Veronica Felibert (W); Ariadna Fonseca (W)	149; 70; 71; 79; 82	149; 74; 75; 78; 75	142; 68; 74; 74; 74	147; 74; 75; 73; 76	587 (+11)
8	Canada	Austin Connelly (M); Garrett Rank (M); Lorie Kane (W)	149; 70; 79; 79	152; 69; 72; 83	145; 70; 72; 75	144; 71; 70; 74	590 (+14)
9	Brazil	Andre Tourinho (M); Adilson da Silva (M); Luiza Altmann (W); Clara Teixeira (W)	152; 70; 71 – 82	147; 74; 70; 77; 82	146; 70; 73; 76; 87	148; 72; 72; 76; 82	593 (+17)
T10	Bolivia	José Luis Montaño (M); George Scanlon (M); Natalia Pérez (W); Natalia Soria (W)	147; 70; 83; 77; 84	152; 72; 74; 83; 80	148; 75; 69; 79; 86	152; 73; 79; 79; 79	599 (+23)
T10	Guatemala	Daniel Gurtner (M); Sebastian Barnoya (M); Lucia Polo (W); Pilar Echeverria (W)	153; 76; 77; 77; 78	154; 76; 79; 78; 83	147; 71; 74; 76; 76	145; 73; 75; 72; 78	599 (+23)
T10	Paraguay	Gustavo Silvero (M); Julieta Granada (W); Milagros Chaves (W)	148; 80; 68; 83	154; 83; 71; 73	151; 79; 72; 73	146; 74; 72; 73	599 (+23)
13	Chile	Felipe Aguilar (M); Mark Tullo (M); Pilar Schele (W); Valentina Haupt (W)	151; 69; 74; 90; 82	150; 67; 69; 90; 83	148; 69; 74; 84; 79	151; 71; 70; 82; 81	600 (+24)
14	Puerto Rico	Erick Juan Morales (M); Maria Torres (W)	148; 71; 77	151; 76; 75	153; 74; 79	152; 76; 76	604 (+28)
15	Trinidad and Tobago	Sachin Kumar (M); Talin Rajendranath (M); Christina Ferreira (W); Monifa Sealy (W)	155; 78; 74; 84; 81	153; 76; 78; 85; 77	150; 73; 75; 79; 77	156; 75; 74; 82; 83	614 (+38)
16	Uruguay	Juan Álvarez (M); Manuela Barros (W); Priscilla Schmid (W)	161; 82; 87; 79	160; 73; 92; 87	148; 68; 85; 80	150; 71; 79; 84	619 (+43)
