= Marcelo Rozo =

Colombian professional golfer (born 1989)

Personal information
- Full name: Marcelo Rozo Rengifo
- Nationality: Colombia
- Born: 6 September 1989 (age 37) Bogotá, Colombia
- Height: 5 ft 11 in (1.80 m)
- Weight: 185 lb (84 kg; 13.2 st)

Career
- Sport: Golf
- Turned professional: 2012
- Current tour: PGA Tour
- Former tours: Korn Ferry Tour; PGA Tour Latinoamérica; Colombian Tour
- Professional wins: 10

Best results in major championships
- Masters Tournament: DNP
- PGA Championship: DNP
- U.S. Open: CUT: 2026
- The Open Championship: DNP
Medal record
Men's golf
Representing Colombia
Pan American Games
Gold medal – first place	2015 Toronto	Individual
Gold medal – first place	2015 Toronto	Mixed team
Central American and Caribbean Games
Gold medal – first place	2018 Barranquilla	Individual

Marcelo Rozo Rengifo (born 6 September 1989) is a Colombian professional golfer who plays on PGA Tour.

== Professional career ==
Rozo turned professional in 2012. He became a full-time member of PGA Tour Latinoamérica in 2013 and won his first title on the tour at the Visa Open de Argentina on 8 December 2013. Having shot a course record 64 in the second round, Rozo eventually won the tournament by two strokes in a field including two-time major winner Ángel Cabrera.

Rozo earned his second win on PGA Tour Latinoamérica at the TransAmerican Power Products CRV Open at Guadalajara on 23 March 2014, eagling the second playoff hole in a seven-way playoff. This win moved Rozo to a career high of 414th in the Official World Golf Ranking and into the top 500 for the first time in his career. Later he finished second at the Ecuador Open and Colombian Classic, third at the Abierto del Centro, fourth at the Argentine Open, fifth at the Roberto De Vicenzo Invitational Copa NEC, sixth at the Lexus Panama Classic and ninth at the Mexico Open. With US$89,117 in earnings, he ended second at the PGA Tour Latinoamérica Order of Merit.

In 2015, Rozo won the gold medal at the Pan American Games. However, he missed the cut at each of his seven appearances at the Web.com Tour. Therefore, he switched to the PGA Tour Latinoamérica mid-season, collecting a 6th finish at the Guatemala Open and a 7th at the Colombian Classic. In 2018, Rozo won the gold medal at the Central American and Caribbean Games.

Rozo earned his 2026 PGA Tour card via Qualifying School in December 2025.

== Professional wins (10) ==
=== PGA Tour Latinoamérica wins (3) ===
No.	Date	Tournament	Winning score	Margin of victory	Runner(s)-up
1	8 Dec 2013	Visa Open de Argentina	−10 (73-64-69-72=278)	2 strokes	(United States) Jeff Gove
2	23 Mar 2014	TransAmerican Power Products CRV Open	−17 (67-65-66-69=267)	Playoff	(Mexico) Mauricio Azcué, (United States) Rick Cochran III, (Mexico) Roberto Díaz, (Argentina) Lucho Dodd, (Argentina) Julián Etulain, (United States) Matt Ryan
3	23 Sep 2018	JHSF Aberto do Brasil	−20 (69-67-65-63=264)	1 stroke	(Australia) Harrison Endycott, (United States) Chase Hanna

=== Chilean Tour wins (1) ===
No.	Date	Tournament	Winning score	Margin of victory	Runner-up
1	16 Nov 2013	Abierto del Club de Polo y Equitación San Cristóbal	−13 (68-66-69=203)	1 stroke	(Chile) Santiago Russi

=== Colombian Tour wins (3) ===
No.	Date	Tournament	Winning score	Margin of victory	Runner-up
1	13 Aug 2017	Abierto Club Campestre de Medellín	−16 (69-67-69-67=272)	Playoff	(Colombia) Nico Echavarría
2	22 Jul 2018	Abierto del Club El Rodeo	−18 (64-72-68-66=270)	8 strokes	(Colombia) Oswaldo Villada
3	29 Jul 2018	Cartagena-Karibana Colombian Open	−16 (65-70-65=200) (Note: Shortened to 54 holes due to weather.)	1 stroke	(Colombia) Nico Echavarría

=== PGA Tour Latinoamerica Developmental Series wins (1) ===
No.	Date	Tournament	Winning score	Margin of victory	Runner-up
1	11 Dec 2016	Malinalco Classic Dev Series Final	−12 (66-70-71-69=272)	Playoff	(Japan) Eric Sugimoto

=== Other wins (2) ===
No.	Date	Tournament	Winning score	Margin of victory	Runner(s)-up
1	19 Jul 2015	Pan American Games	−13 (68-76-63-68=275)	1 stroke	(Chile) Felipe Aguilar, (Argentina) Tommy Cocha
2	2 Aug 2018	Central American and Caribbean Games	−24 (67-66-65-66=264)	13 strokes	(Mexico) Raúl Pereda

== Playoff record ==
Korn Ferry Tour playoff record (0–1)

No.	Year	Tournament	Opponent	Result
1	2019	Evans Scholars Invitational	(United States) Scottie Scheffler	Lost to birdie on second extra hole

== Results in major championships ==
Tournament	2026
Masters Tournament	
PGA Championship	
U.S. Open	CUT
The Open Championship	

Did not play

CUT = missed the half-way cut
T = tied

== Team appearances ==
Amateur

- Eisenhower Trophy (representing Colombia): 2010, 2012

== See also ==
- 2025 PGA Tour Qualifying School graduates
