= Colombia Championship =

Golf tournament in Bogotá, Colombia

Astara Golf Championship
Tournament information
- Location: Bogotá, Colombia
- Established: 2010
- Courses: Country Club de Bogotá (Lagos Course) (Paco Course)
- Par: 71 (L); 70 (P)
- Length: 7,237 yards (6,618 m) (L); 6,206 yards (5,675 m) (P)
- Tour: Korn Ferry Tour
- Format: Stroke play
- Prize fund: US$1,000,000
- Month played: February

Tournament record score
- Aggregate: 261 Brian Campbell (2024); 261 Kevin Velo (2024)
- To par: −22 as above

Current champion
- (United States) James Nicholas

Final champion
- Location in Colombia

The Colombia Championship is a golf tournament on the U.S.-based Korn Ferry Tour. It was first played in 2010 at The Country Club of Bogotá in Bogotá, Colombia. The 2025 purse was US$1,000,000, with $180,000 going to the winner.

In the 2024 event, Cristóbal del Solar shot a round of 57, breaking the record for the lowest ever round in a PGA Tour sanctioned event.

== Winners ==
Year	Winner	Score	To par	Margin of victory	Runner(s)-up
Astara Golf Championship
2026	(United States) James Nicholas	265	−19	2 strokes	(United States) Norman Xiong
2025	(United States) Kyle Westmoreland	265	−18	1 stroke	(United States) Pierceson Coody (South Africa) Christo Lamprecht
2024	(United States) Kevin Velo	261	−22	Playoff	(United States) Brian Campbell
2023	(Australia) Rhein Gibson	267	−16	4 strokes	(United States) Kevin Dougherty
2022	(United States) Brandon Matthews	264	−19	1 stroke	(United States) Ben Griffin (United States) Ryan McCormick
2021: No tournament
Country Club de Bogotá Championship
2020	(Chile) Mito Pereira	263	−20	2 strokes	(United States) Ben Kohles
2019	(United States) Mark Anderson	266	−17	4 strokes	(United States) Drew Weaver
Club Colombia Championship
2018	(England) Ben Taylor	269	−15	6 strokes	(United States) Erik Barnes (United States) Sam Burns (United States) Jason Gore (South Korea) Lee Kyoung-hoon
2017	(United States) Ethan Tracy	271	−13	Playoff	(Mexico) Roberto Díaz
2016	(Colombia) Sebastián Muñoz	272	−12	1 stroke	(United States) Matt Atkins (United States) Richy Werenski
Pacific Rubiales Colombia Championship
2015	(United States) Patrick Rodgers	267	−17	Playoff	(United States) Steve Marino
2014	(Germany) Alex Čejka	199 (Note: Shortened to 54 holes due to rain.)	−14	3 strokes	(United States) Andrew Putnam
Colombia Championship
2013	(United States) Patrick Cantlay	266	−18	4 strokes	(United States) Jim Renner
Pacific Rubiales Colombia Championship
2012	(United States) Skip Kendall	274	−10	1 stroke	(United States) Andres Gonzales (United States) Andrew Svoboda
Pacific Rubiales Bogotá Open
2011	(South Africa) Brenden Pappas	133 (Note: Shortened to 36 holes due to rain. Due to the event's length, this win is not officially recognised.)	−9	1 stroke	(United States) Matt Every
2010	(United States) Steve Pate	273	−11	Playoff	(United States) Aaron Watkins
