= Austin Cook =

American professional golfer (born 1991)

Personal information
- Full name: Austin Clark Cook
- Nationality: United States
- Born: March 13, 1991 (age 35) Little Rock, Arkansas, U.S.
- Height: 5 ft 7 in (1.70 m)
- Weight: 160 lb (73 kg; 11 st)
- Spouse: Crys Cook

Career
- Sport: Golf
- College: University of Arkansas
- Turned professional: 2014
- Current tour: PGA Tour
- Former tour: Web.com Tour
- Professional wins: 1
- Highest ranking: 96 (July 22, 2018) (as of October 25, 2026)

Number of wins by tour
- PGA Tour: 1

Best results in major championships
- Masters Tournament: CUT: 2018
- PGA Championship: T50: 2018
- U.S. Open: DNP
- The Open Championship: T28: 2018

Austin Clark Cook (born March 13, 1991) is an American professional golfer.

== Background ==
Cook was born in Little Rock, Arkansas, attended the University of Arkansas, and is a native of Jonesboro, Arkansas.

== Amateur career ==
Cook had a decorated college career at the University of Arkansas. He was a two-time Southeastern Conference Scholar-Athlete of the Year, and in his sophomore year earned all-America honors when he finished 10th individually at the 2011 NCAA Championship. In 2010 he was named to the SEC All-Freshman team. He served as a mainstay in the Razorback lineup during his college career with 48 tournaments played, a 73.37 career stroke average and nine top-10 finishes. Cook was the runner-up at the NCAA Fayetteville Regional in 2013, earning him all-central region accolades.

== Professional career ==
Cook turned pro in 2014. He finished T-130 in Web.com Tour Q-school, but never got to play a Web.com Tour event due to his finish in Q School and limited status. In the summer of 2014, he made it into the FedEx St. Jude Classic through Monday qualifying, finishing tied for 13th place, at 5-under-par. Cook has played on the Adams Pro Tour. His career earnings as of April 1, 2015 were over $100k.

In April 2015, Cook made it into the Shell Houston Open through the Monday qualifier, finding himself in contention in short order. With a 4-under-par 68 on Thursday, Cook made a strong close on Friday, with four consecutive birdies to win a spot in the final group along with Andrew Putnam and Phil Mickelson. On Saturday of the tournament, Golfweek said Cook "did not fold under the pressure of playing alongside Phil Mickelson," and carded a 2-under 70 as he headed into Sunday's final round one off of Jordan Spieth's lead, tied for second place at 203 with first-round leader Scott Piercy and Johnson Wagner. On the final day, Cook finished at −10 and tied for 11th, one position short of automatic entry into the Zurich Classic of New Orleans, the next full-field PGA Tour event. His earnings for the tournament were $135,000.

At the 2015 Barbasol Championship, Cook Monday qualified his way to a T6 finish. That gave him entry into the RBC Canadian Open, where he finished T7.

Cook earned enough non-member FedEx Cup points to qualify for the 2015 Web.com Tour Finals. He ended the Finals 51st among players who had not earned their cards through the regular season, one place short of full Web.com Tour status and avoiding Q School.

Cook earned his PGA Tour card during the 2017 Web.com Tour season and earned his first PGA Tour win at the RSM Classic in November 2017.

== Professional wins (1) ==
=== PGA Tour wins (1) ===
No.	Date	Tournament	Winning score	Margin of victory	Runner-up
1	Nov 19, 2017	RSM Classic	−21 (66-62-66-67=261)	4 strokes	(United States) J. J. Spaun

PGA Tour playoff record (0–1)

No.	Year	Tournament	Opponents	Result
1	2020	Shriners Hospitals for Children Open	(Scotland) Martin Laird, (United States) Matthew Wolff	Laird won with birdie on second extra hole

== Results in major championships ==
Tournament	2018
Masters Tournament	CUT
U.S. Open	
The Open Championship	T28
PGA Championship	T50

Did not play

CUT = missed the half-way cut
"T" = tied

== Results in The Players Championship ==
Tournament	2018	2019	2020	2021
The Players Championship	T46	CUT	C	CUT

CUT = missed the halfway cut
"T" indicates a tie for a place
C = Canceled after the first round due to the COVID-19 pandemic

== Results in World Golf Championships ==
Tournament	2018
Championship	
Match Play	
Invitational	T53
Champions	

Did not play

"T" = Tied

== See also ==
- 2017 Web.com Tour Finals graduates
- 2021 Korn Ferry Tour Finals graduates
- 2022 Korn Ferry Tour Finals graduates
