= Andrew McArthur =

Scottish golfer (born 1979)

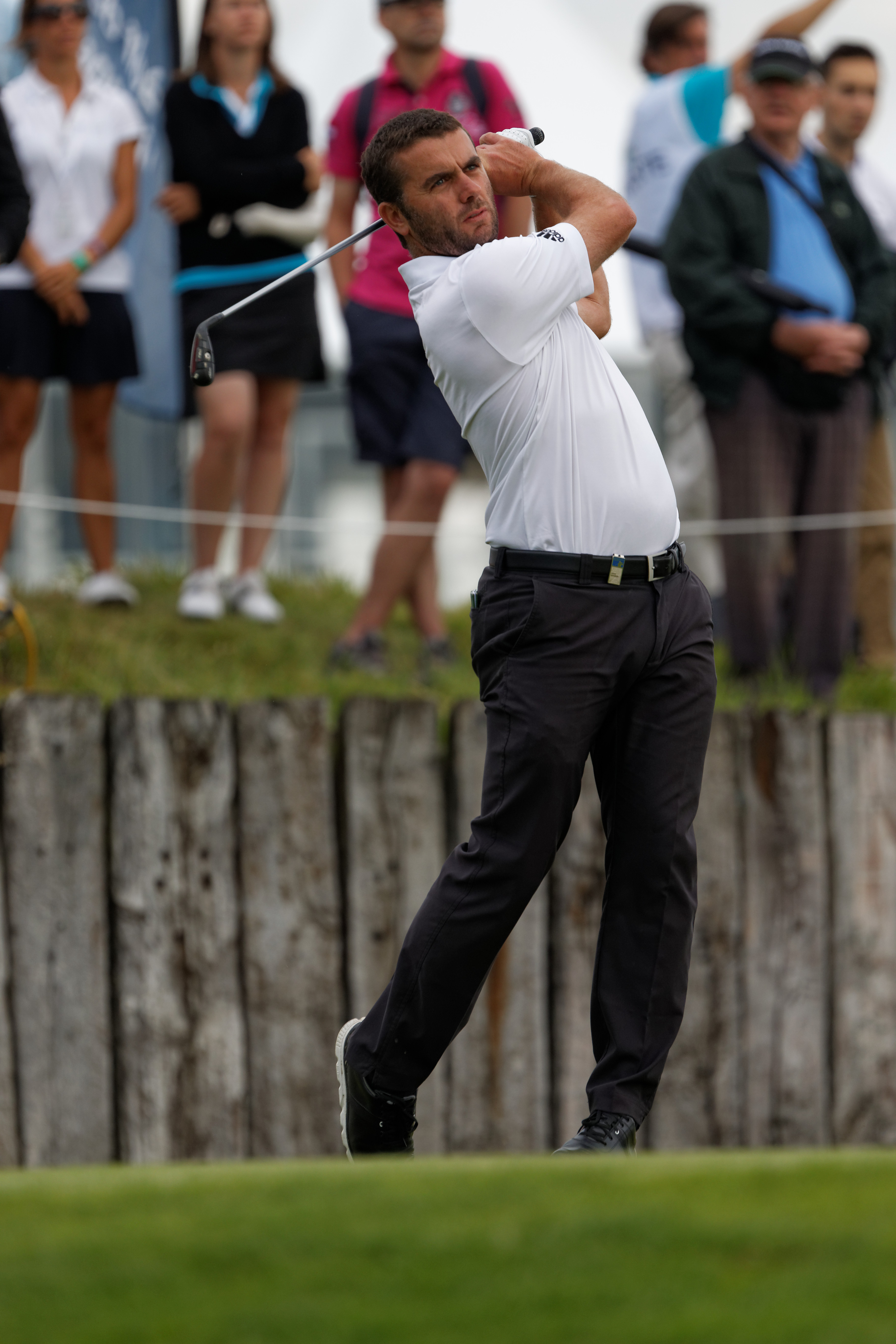

Personal information
- Full name: Andrew McArthur
- Nickname: Dru
- Nationality: Scotland
- Born: 8 May 1979 (age 47) Lanark, Scotland
- Height: 1.80 m (5 ft 11 in)
- Weight: 85 kg (187 lb; 13.4 st)
- Spouse: Laura (m. 2009)
- Children: 2

Career
- Sport: Golf
- College: Pfeiffer University
- Turned professional: 2005
- Current tour: Challenge Tour
- Former tour: European Tour
- Professional wins: 4

Number of wins by tour
- Challenge Tour: 2
- Other: 2

Andrew McArthur (born 8 May 1979) is a Scottish professional golfer.

== Career ==
McArthur was born in Lanark. He turned professional in 2005 after a successful amateur career. McArthur qualified for the second tier Challenge Tour by reaching the final stage of qualifying school. He narrowly missed out on graduating to the elite European Tour three times by ending the 2006, 2007 and 2008 seasons just outside the top 20 on the Challenge Tour Rankings. McArthur finally gained his European Tour card for 2010 by finishing in 17th place on the rankings in 2009.

McArthur has two wins on the Challenge Tour: the Reale Challenge de España in 2008 and the D+D Real Slovakia Challenge in 2014.

== Amateur wins ==
- 2002 Scottish Amateur Championship
- 2003 NCAA Division II Championship
- 2005 Czech Amateur Open Championship

== Professional wins (4) ==
=== Challenge Tour wins (2) ===
No.	Date	Tournament	Winning score	Margin of victory	Runner(s)-up
1	8 Jun 2008	Reale Challenge de España	−8 (69-65-72-74=280)	1 stroke	(Spain) Alfredo García-Heredia, (Scotland) Lloyd Saltman
2	13 Jul 2014	D+D Real Slovakia Challenge	−21 (65-66-68-68=267)	2 strokes	(England) Sam Hutsby

Challenge Tour playoff record (0–1)

No.	Year	Tournament	Opponents	Result
1	2007	Postbank Challenge	(Chile) Felipe Aguilar, (England) Paul Waring	Aguilar won with par on second extra hole Waring eliminated by par on first hole

=== Hi5 Pro Tour wins (1) ===
No.	Date	Tournament	Winning score	Margin of victory	Runner-up
1	24 Nov 2011	Hacienda de Alamo Futures Open	−13 (68-67-68=203)	Playoff	(England) Andy Sullivan

=== Other wins (1) ===
- 2011 Paul Lawrie Invitational

== Team appearances ==
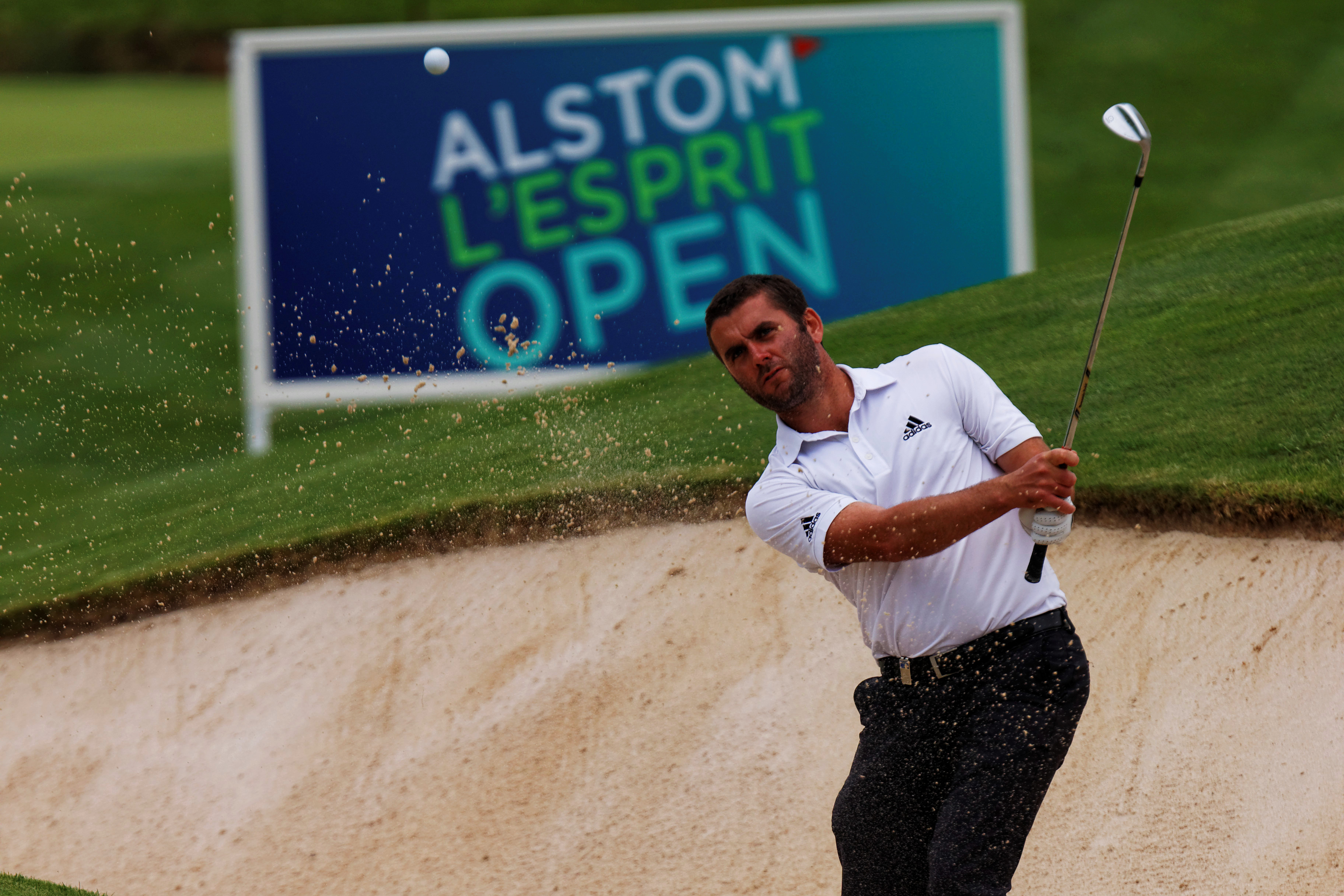
Andrew McArthur

Amateur

- European Amateur Team Championship (representing Scotland): 2003, 2005
- St Andrews Trophy (representing Great Britain & Ireland): 2004 (winners)

== See also ==
- 2009 Challenge Tour graduates
- 2015 Challenge Tour graduates
