= Paul Waring =

English professional golfer (born 1985)

Personal information
- Full name: Paul James Waring
- Nationality: England
- Born: 2 February 1985 (age 41) Birkenhead, [Merseyside, England
- Height: 5 ft 11 in (1.80 m)

Career
- Sport: Golf
- Turned professional: 2007
- Current tours: PGA Tour; European Tour
- Former tour: Challenge Tour
- Professional wins: 2
- Highest ranking: 66 (19 January 2020) (as of 25 October 2026)

Number of wins by tour
- European Tour: 2

Best results in major championships
- Masters Tournament: DNP
- PGA Championship: DNP
- U.S. Open: CUT: 2018, 2020
- The Open Championship: T19: 2008

Paul James Waring (born 2 February 1985) is an English professional golfer.

== Early life and amateur career ==
Waring was born in Birkenhead. He had a successful amateur career which included winning the English Amateur in 2005.

== Professional career ==
Waring turned professional in 2007 and had almost immediate success on the second-tier Challenge Tour when he lost out in a playoff to Felipe Aguilar at the Postbank Challenge in Germany. He has since competed on the European Tour after gaining his card at that year's qualifying school.

On the European Tour, Waring finished tied for third place in the 2013 Portugal Masters and the 2015 Maybank Malaysian Open.

In February 2017, Waring had his highest finish on the tour when he was runner-up in the Joburg Open. This event was one of the Open Qualifying Series events for the 2017 Open Championship, gaining him an entry to The Open for the first time since 2008.

Waring earned his first European Tour win in his 200th start in August 2018. He won the Nordea Masters in Sweden, beating Thomas Aiken in a playoff.

Waring won for the second time on the European Tour by winning the Abu Dhabi HSBC Championship in November 2024. He won by two shots ahead of Tyrrell Hatton.

== Amateur wins ==
- 2001 McGregor Trophy
- 2005 English Amateur

== Professional wins (2) ==
=== European Tour wins (2) ===
Legend
Playoff events (1)
Rolex Series (1) (Note: The Abu Dhabi HSBC Championship is also a Rolex Series tournament.)
Other European Tour (1)

No.	Date	Tournament	Winning score	Margin of victory	Runner-up
1	19 Aug 2018	Nordea Masters	−14 (66-63-69-68=266)	Playoff	(South Africa) Thomas Aiken
2	10 Nov 2024	Abu Dhabi HSBC Championship	−24 (64-61-73-66=264)	2 strokes	(England) Tyrrell Hatton

European Tour playoff record (1–0)

No.	Year	Tournament	Opponent	Result
1	2018	Nordea Masters	(South Africa) Thomas Aiken	Won with par on first extra hole

== Playoff record ==
Challenge Tour playoff record (0–1)

No.	Year	Tournament	Opponents	Result
1	2007	Postbank Challenge	(Chile) Felipe Aguilar, (Scotland) Andrew McArthur	Aguilar won with par on second extra hole Waring eliminated by par on first hole

== Results in major championships ==
Results not in chronological order in 2020.

Tournament	2007	2008	2009
Masters Tournament			
U.S. Open			
The Open Championship	CUT	T19	
PGA Championship			

Tournament	2010	2011	2012	2013	2014	2015	2016	2017	2018
Masters Tournament									
U.S. Open									CUT
The Open Championship								CUT	
PGA Championship									

Tournament	2019	2020	2021
Masters Tournament			
PGA Championship			
U.S. Open		CUT	
The Open Championship	T63	NT	CUT

Did not play

CUT = missed the half-way cut
"T" = tied
NT = no tournament due to COVID-19 pandemic

== Results in World Golf Championships ==
Tournament	2019
Championship	
Match Play	
Invitational	
Champions	T8

Top 10
Did not play

"T" = Tied

== Team appearances ==
Amateur

- European Boys' Team Championship (representing England): 2002, 2003
- Jacques Léglise Trophy (representing Great Britain and Ireland): 2002 (winners), 2003 (winners)
- European Youths' Team Championship (representing England): 2004, 2006
- European Amateur Team Championship (representing England): 2007

Professional

- Team Cup (representing Great Britain and Ireland): 2025 (winners)

== See also ==
- 2007 European Tour Qualifying School graduates
- 2024 Race to Dubai dual card winners
