= Conrad Shindler =

American professional golfer

Personal information
- Full name: James Conrad Shindler IV
- Nationality: United States
- Born: July 20, 1988 (age 38) Phoenix, Arizona, U.S.
- Height: 5 ft 8 in (1.73 m)
- Weight: 200 lb (91 kg; 14 st)

Career
- Sport: Golf
- College: Texas A&M University
- Turned professional: 2011
- Current tour: Web.com Tour
- Former tours: PGA Tour; PGA Tour Canada
- Professional wins: 1

Number of wins by tour
- Korn Ferry Tour: 1

James Conrad Shindler IV (born July 20, 1988) is an American professional golfer.

Shindler was born in Phoenix, Arizona. He played college golf at Texas A&M University, helping the team win the NCAA Division I Championship in 2009.

Shindler turned professional after graduating in 2011. He played on the Canadian Tour in 2013 and returned in 2016; his best finish was second place at the 2016 ATB Financial Classic. In 2017 he played on the Web.com Tour and won the Rex Hospital Open. He finished 17th on the money list to earn his 2018 PGA Tour card. He made only 9 cuts in 20 events in 2018, with a best finish of T15 at the Barbasol Championship. He finished 192nd on the FedEx Cup points list and returned to the Web.com Tour in 2019.

Shindler was also a member of the winning scramble team at the 2025 Warm Place Classic Fore the Children.

== Professional wins (1) ==
=== Web.com Tour wins (1) ===
No.	Date	Tournament	Winning score	Margin of victory	Runner-up
1	Jun 4, 2017	Rex Hospital Open	−15 (68-69-65-67=269)	Playoff	(United States) Chesson Hadley

Web.com Tour playoff record (1–0)

No.	Year	Tournament	Opponent	Result
1	2017	Rex Hospital Open	(United States) Chesson Hadley	Won with par on first extra hole

== See also ==
- 2017 Web.com Tour Finals graduates
