= 2017 Web.com Tour Finals graduates =

This is a list of golfers who graduated from the Web.com Tour and Web.com Tour Finals in 2017. The top 25 players on the Web.com Tour's regular season money list in 2017 earned PGA Tour cards for 2018. The Finals determined the other 25 players to earn their PGA Tour cards and the priority order of all 50.

As in previous seasons, the Finals featured the top 75 players on the Web.com Tour regular season money list, players ranked 126–200 on the PGA Tour's regular-season FedEx Cup points list (except players exempt through other means), non-members of the PGA Tour with enough regular-season FedExCup points to place 126–200, and special medical exemptions.

To determine the initial 2018 PGA Tour priority rank, the top 25 Web.com Tour regular season players were alternated with the top 25 Web.com Tour Finals players. This priority order will then be reshuffled several times during the 2018 season.

Chesson Hadley was fully exempt for the 2017–18 PGA Tour season after leading both the full-season money list and the Finals money list.

== 2017 Web.com Tour Finals ==
Player	2017 Web.com Tour regular season		2017 FedEx Cup	2017 Web.com Tour Finals				The 25 Regular + Finals		Priority rank
Player	Rank	Earnings ($)	2017 FedEx Cup	Rank	Without The 25	Earnings ($)	Best finish	Rank	Earnings ($)	Priority rank
(United States) Chesson Hadley	9	264,350	211	1		298,125	Win	1	562,475	Exempt
(United States) Brice Garnett	1	368,761		48		26,452	T20	2	395,212	1
(United States) Peter Uihlein*				2	1	185,864	Win			2
(United States) Andrew Landry	4	292,939		10		95,955	T3	3	388,894	3
(United States) Jonathan Byrd	55	87,178	170	3	2	185,480	Win			4
(Mexico) Abraham Ancer	3	295,528		30		42,470	T5	4	337,998	5
(United States) Nicholas Lindheim			197	4	3	183,020	Win			6
(United States) Sam Ryder*	2	314,306		T91		7,448	T25	5	321,753	7
(United States) Rob Oppenheim	27	150,693		5	4	161,150	T2			8
(United States) Ted Potter Jr.	14	207,368	228	8		112,225	T2	6	319,593	9
(United States) Ryan Armour			159	6	5	118,206	2			10
(Germany) Stephan Jäger*	5	278,364		T84		8,033	T24	7	286,397	11
(United States) Sam Saunders	149	17,400	129	7	6	115,900	T2			12
(United States) Talor Gooch*	6	271,316		T84		8,033	T24	8	279,349	13
(United States) Shawn Stefani			165	9	7	99,240	T2			14
(United States) Andrew Putnam	8	266,296		73		12,532	T25	9	278,828	15
(United States) Jonathan Randolph			160	11	8	94,190	T2			16
(Canada) Ben Silverman*	10	256,906		55		21,281	T20	10	278,187	17
(United States) Bronson Burgoon	103	40,116		12	9	90,812	4			18
(United States) Austin Cook*	15	206,515		13		70,875	T8	11	277,390	19
(United States) Keith Mitchell*	26	151,444		14	10	66,050	T6			20
(United States) Nate Lashley*	11	252,160		52		22,326	T19	12	274,486	21
(United States) Tyler Duncan*	31	136,219		15	11	63,408	T5			22
(United States) Kyle Thompson	7	266,312		118		2,430	T68	13	268,742	23
(United States) Denny McCarthy*	43	109,856		16	12	63,105	T9			24
(United States) Adam Schenk*	12	236,792		68		15,230	T17	14	252,022	25
(United States) Troy Merritt			151	17	13	59,650	T6			26
(United States) Matt Atkins*	19	192,029		21		54,000	T6	15	246,029	27
(United States) Tom Lovelady*	29	137,611		18	14	58,000	T3			28
(United States) Conrad Shindler*	17	203,483		40		29,800	T9	16	233,283	29
(United States) Martin Piller	28	144,667		19	15	54,700	4			30
(United States) Andrew Yun*	13	222,856		99		4,300	T40	17	227,156	31
(Germany) Alex Čejka			149	22	16	53,480	4			32
(United States) Lanto Griffin*	22	169,689		20		54,348	T8	18	224,037	33
(Australia) Matt Jones			152	23	17	47,740	T5			34
(United States) Aaron Wise*	18	199,922		72		12,650	T17	19	212,572	35
(United States) Cameron Tringale			133	24	18	47,445	T5			36
(China) Dou Zecheng*	16	203,630		98		4,400	T39	20	208,030	37
(United States) Brett Stegmaier			181	25	19	46,500	T8			38
(United States) Ethan Tracy*	24	161,211		T42		28,000	T8	21	189,211	39
(Canada) Corey Conners*	49	95,769		26	20	45,114	T11			40
(China) Zhang Xinjun*	20	186,306		112		2,590	T60	22	188,896	41
(United States) Steve Wheatcroft	183	6,891	179	27	21	44,526	T11			42
(United States) Brandon Harkins*	21	172,162		82		8,454	T29	23	180,615	43
(United States) Chad Collins			143	28	22	44,348	T6			44
(Mexico) Roberto Díaz*	25	157,823		63		17,343	T20	24	175,166	45
(United States) Tom Hoge	224	1,689	166	29	23	44,048	T12			46
(United States) Beau Hossler^{†}	23	164,326		T101		3,120	T45	25	167,446	47
(United States) Joel Dahmen	178	8,080	176	31	24	41,943	T6			48
(Republic of Ireland) Séamus Power			130	32	25	40,625	T13			49

*PGA Tour rookie in 2018
^{†}First-time PGA Tour member in 2018, but ineligible for rookie status due to having played eight or more PGA Tour events in a previous season

- Earned spot in Finals through PGA Tour.
- Earned spot in Finals through FedEx Cup points earned as a PGA Tour non-member.
- Earned spot in Finals through a medical extension.
- Indicates whether the player earned his card through the regular season or through the Finals.

== Results on 2017–18 PGA Tour ==
Player	Starts	Cuts made	Best finish	Money list rank	Earnings ($)	FedEx Cup rank
(United States) Chesson Hadley	30	23	2	33	2,768,863	44
(United States) Brice Garnett	30	20	Win	85	1,466,224	61
(United States) Peter Uihlein*	25	15	5/T5x3	67	1,797,715	64
(United States) Andrew Landry	27	15	Win	41	2,642,179	37
(United States) Jonathan Byrd	24	11	T15	186	267,055	181
(Mexico) Abraham Ancer	30	20	T4	73	1,676,695	60
(United States) Nicholas Lindheim	26	13	T7	146	593,842	146
(United States) Sam Ryder*	26	15	T2	113	1,046,166	101
(United States) Rob Oppenheim	26	11	T15	185	279,019	180
(United States) Ted Potter Jr.	28	15	Win	58	1,976,198	65
(United States) Ryan Armour	32	22	Win	44	2,485,203	49
(Germany) Stephan Jäger*	26	14	T13	165	422,260	165
(United States) Sam Saunders	26	14	T5	115	981,936	120
(United States) Talor Gooch*	27	12	T13	141	654,200	139
(United States) Shawn Stefani	25	12	T10	155	523,204	147
(United States) Andrew Putnam	28	21	Win	49	2,387,382	33
(United States) Jonathan Randolph	25	11	3	162	453,328	174
(Canada) Ben Silverman*	28	17	T7	129	793,140	136
(United States) Bronson Burgoon	24	11	T2	103	1,179,616	78
(United States) Austin Cook*	29	24	Win	48	2,448,920	38
(United States) Keith Mitchell*	29	21	2	74	1,641,260	67
(United States) Nate Lashley*	17	8	T15	183	296,650	172
(United States) Tyler Duncan*	31	17	T5	119	944,021	113
(United States) Kyle Thompson	22	2	T44	235	24,878	236
(United States) Denny McCarthy*	22	13	4	157	498,341	149
(United States) Adam Schenk*	28	14	T7	160	474,923	157
(United States) Troy Merritt	27	17	Win	95	1,326,989	91
(United States) Matt Atkins*	21	6	T22	215	89,104	211
(United States) Tom Lovelady*	28	15	T2	137	700,783	134
(United States) Conrad Shindler*	20	9	T15	195	187,399	192
(United States) Martin Piller	28	11	T3	125	847,304	126
(United States) Andrew Yun*	22	3	T22	230	41,566	231
(Germany) Alex Čejka	24	16	T2	101	1,198,541	108
(United States) Lanto Griffin*	26	13	T12	176	358,380	171
(Australia) Matt Jones	23	11	T12	153	538,681	151
(United States) Aaron Wise*	29	16	Win	28	3,486,407	24
(United States) Cameron Tringale	26	7	T25	198	179,459	195
(China) Dou Zecheng*	23	4	T51	214	90,993	227
(United States) Brett Stegmaier	21	12	T11	180	305,607	179
(United States) Ethan Tracy*	23	12	T13	175	364,493	177
(Canada) Corey Conners*	28	20	T8	133	728,296	130
(China) Zhang Xinjun*	28	12	T5	166	420,377	167
(United States) Steve Wheatcroft	20	9	T10	179	309,656	183
(United States) Brandon Harkins*	30	21	T8	104	1,148,115	103
(United States) Chad Collins	0	0	DNP	n/a	0	n/a
(Mexico) Roberto Díaz*	25	11	T25	188	235,635	189
(United States) Tom Hoge	31	20	3	94	1,358,542	92
(United States) Beau Hossler^{†}	28	24	2/T2x2	46	2,449,707	46
(United States) Joel Dahmen	28	19	T2	83	1,476,838	80
(Republic of Ireland) Séamus Power	28	15	T5	130	791,018	114

- *PGA Tour rookie in 2018
- ^{†}First-time PGA Tour member in 2018, but ineligible for rookie status due to having played eight or more Tour events in a previous season
- Retained his PGA Tour card for 2019: won or finished in the top 125 of the FedEx Cup points list.
- Retained PGA Tour conditional status and qualified for the Web.com Tour Finals: finished between 126–150 on FedEx Cup list and qualified for Web.com Tour Finals.
- Failed to retain his PGA Tour card for 2019 but qualified for the Web.com Tour Finals: finished between 150–200 on FedEx Cup list.
- Failed to retain his PGA Tour card for 2019 and to qualify for the Web.com Tour Finals: finished outside the top 200 on FedEx Cup list.

Roberto Díaz, Stephan Jäger, Matt Jones, Nicholas Lindheim, Denny McCarthy, Adam Schenk, Ben Silverman, Shawn Stefani, and Cameron Tringale regained their cards through the 2018 Web.com Tour Finals.

== Winners on the PGA Tour in 2018 ==
No.	Date	Player	Tournament	Winning score	Margin of victory	Runner-up	Payout ($)
1	Oct 29, 2017	(United States) Ryan Armour	Sanderson Farms Championship	−19 (66-68-67-68=269)	5 strokes	(United States) Chesson Hadley	774,000
2	Nov 19, 2017	(United States) Austin Cook	RSM Classic	−21 (66-62-66-67=261)	4 strokes	(United States) J. J. Spaun	1,116,000
3	Feb 11	(United States) Ted Potter Jr.	AT&T Pebble Beach Pro-Am	−17 (68-71-62-69=270)	3 strokes	(Australia) Jason Day (United States) Dustin Johnson (United States) Phil Mickelson (United States) Chez Reavie	1,332,000
4	Mar 25	(United States) Brice Garnett	Corales Puntacana Resort and Club Championship	−18 (63-68-69-70=270)	4 strokes	(United States) Keith Mitchell	540,000
5	Apr 22	(United States) Andrew Landry	Valero Texas Open	−17 (69-67-67-68=271)	2 strokes	(United States) Trey Mullinax (United States) Sean O'Hair	1,116,000
6	May 20	(United States) Aaron Wise	AT&T Byron Nelson	−23 (65-63-68-65=261)	3 strokes	(Australia) Marc Leishman	1,386,000
7	Jul 23	(United States) Troy Merritt	Barbasol Championship	−23 (62-67-69-67=265)	1 stroke	(United States) Billy Horschel (United States) Tom Lovelady (United States) Richy Werenski	630,000
8	Aug 5	(United States) Andrew Putnam	Barracuda Championship	47 points (6-17-15-9)	4 points	(United States) Chad Campbell	612,000

== Runners-up on the PGA Tour in 2018 ==
No.	Date	Player	Tournament	Winner	Winning score	Runner-up score	Payout ($)
1	Oct 29, 2017	(United States) Chesson Hadley	Sanderson Farms Championship	(United States) Ryan Armour	−19 (66-68-67-68=269)	−14 (68-70-68-68=274)	464,400
2	Nov 5, 2017	(Germany) Alex Čejka; Lost in three-man playoff	Shriners Hospitals for Children Open	(United States) Patrick Cantlay	−9 (67-71-70-67=275)	−9 (66-74-72-63=275)	598,400
3	Jan 21	(United States) Andrew Landry; Lost in playoff	CareerBuilder Challenge	(Spain) Jon Rahm	−22 (62-67-70-67=266)	−22 (63-65-70-68=266)	637,200
4	Mar 25	(United States) Keith Mitchell	Corales Puntacana Resort and Club Championship	(United States) Brice Garnett	−18 (63-68-69-70=270)	−14 (66-66-75-67=274)	324,000
5	Apr 1	(United States) Beau Hossler	Houston Open	(England) Ian Poulter	−19 (73-64-65-67=269)	−19 (65-68-69-67=269)	756,000
6	May 6	(United States) Aaron Wise	Wells Fargo Championship	(Australia) Jason Day	−12 (69-67-67-69=272)	−10 (68-68-70-68=274)	677,600
7	Jun 10	(United States) Andrew Putnam	FedEx St. Jude Classic	(United States) Dustin Johnson	−19 (67-63-65-66=261)	−13 (67-64-64-72=267)	712,800
8	Jun 24	(United States) Beau Hossler (2)	Travelers Championship	(United States) Bubba Watson	−17 (70-63-67-63=263)	−14 (65-67-68-66=266	462,000
9	Jul 1	(United States) Ryan Armour	Quicken Loans National	(Italy) Francesco Molinari	−21 (67-65-65-62=259)	−13 (66-65-68-68=267)	766,800
10 &11 &12	Jul 15	(United States) Bronson Burgoon	John Deere Classic	(United States) Michael Kim	−27 (63-64-64-66=257)	−19 (68-62-66-69=265)	382,800
10 &11 &12	Jul 15	(United States) Joel Dahmen	John Deere Classic	(United States) Michael Kim	−27 (63-64-64-66=257)	−19 (64-71-65-65=265)	382,800
10 &11 &12	Jul 15	(United States) Sam Ryder	John Deere Classic	(United States) Michael Kim	−27 (63-64-64-66=257)	−19 (66-66-67-66=265)	382,800
13	Jul 23	(United States) Tom Lovelady	Barbasol Championship	(United States) Troy Merritt	−23 (62-67-69-67=265)	−22 (66-67-65-68=266)	261,333
