= Mariajo Uribe =

Colombian professional golfer (born 1990)

Maríajo Uribe
Personal information
- Full name: María José Uribe Durán
- Nationality: Colombia
- Born: 27 February 1990 (age 36) Girón, Colombia
- Height: 5 ft 6 in (168 cm)

Career
- Sport: Golf
- College: UCLA
- Turned professional: 2009
- Current tour: LPGA Tour (joined 2010)
- Former tours: Ladies European Tour (joined 2010); Futures Tour (2009)
- Professional wins: 2

Number of wins by tour
- Ladies European Tour: 1
- WPGA Tour of Australasia: 1
- Other: 1

Best results in LPGA major championships
- Chevron Championship: T32: 2013
- Women's PGA C'ship: T30: 2012
- U.S. Women's Open: T10: 2008
- Women's British Open: T22: 2013
- Evian Championship: T10: 2014
Medal record
Women's golf
Representing Colombia
Event	1st	2nd	3rd
Pan American Games	2	1	0
CAC Games	1	0	0
South American Games	0	1	0
Bolivarian Games	3	0	1
Total	6	2	1
Pan American Games
Gold medal – first place	2015 Toronto	Individual
Gold medal – first place	2015 Toronto	Mixed team
Silver medal – second place	2023 Santiago	Individual
Central American and Caribbean Games
Gold medal – first place	2014 Veracruz	Individual
South American Games
Silver medal – second place	2014 Santiago	Individual
Bolivarian Games
Gold medal – first place	2017 Santa Marta	Mixed team
Gold medal – first place	2022 Valledupar	Individual
Gold medal – first place	2022 Valledupar	Mixed team
Bronze medal – third place	2017 Santa Marta	Individual

María José Uribe Durán (known more commonly as Mariajo Uribe; born 27 February 1990) is a professional golfer from Colombia, currently playing on the LPGA Tour.

== Amateur career ==
Uribe was born in Girón, Santander. At age 17, she won the 2007 U.S. Women's Amateur, defeating Amanda Blumenherst 1 up. She is the only player from Latin America to have won this championship. Uribe tied for tenth and low amateur at the 2008 U.S. Women's Open and won the 2008 Mexican International Amateur. She played college golf at UCLA, and was an All-American First Team selection in 2008 and 2009.

== Professional career ==
Uribe left UCLA in the spring of 2009 to return to her native Colombia. Prior to the 2009 U.S. Women's Open, Uribe ended her amateur status and competed in the tournament as a professional.

Uribe joined the Futures Tour in July 2009 and competed in the ING New England Golf Classic, finishing in a tie for 15th place. At the end of the year she qualified for both LPGA and LET membership for 2010 on her first attempt.

On 29 May 2011, Uribe won the HSBC Brazil Cup, an unofficial LPGA event, defeating Lindsey Wright by one stroke.

Uribe won the gold medal at the 2015 Pan American Games and the silver medal at the 2014 South American Games. Uribe won the silver medal at the 2023 Pan American Games in Santiago, Chile.

Uribe retired following the 2024 season.

== Amateur wins ==
- 2007 U.S. Women's Amateur
- 2008 Mexican International Amateur

== Professional wins (2) ==
=== Ladies European Tour wins (1) ===
No.	Date	Tournament	Winning score	To par	Margin of victory	Runner-up
1	31 Mar 2024	Women's NSW Open^	67-65-70=202	−14	1 stroke	(England) Bronte Law

^Co-sanctioned with the WPGA Tour of Australasia

=== Other wins (1) ===
- 2011 HSBC Brazil Cup (unofficial LPGA Tour event)

== Results in LPGA majors ==
Results not in chronological order.

Tournament	2006	2007	2008	2009	2010	2011	2012
Chevron Championship			T58			T47	
U.S. Women's Open	CUT	CUT	T10LA	T48		T55	
Women's PGA Championship			CUT		T67	CUT	T30
Women's British Open			T75		T69		CUT

Tournament	2013	2014	2015	2016	2017	2018	2019	2020	2021	2022	2023	2024
Chevron Championship	T32	T34	T64	T65	CUT	CUT	T61					
U.S. Women's Open	T17	T30	CUT	CUT	CUT							CUT
Women's PGA Championship	T53	CUT	CUT	T64	CUT	CUT	T48				CUT	
The Evian Championship	T67	T10	T38	CUT	CUT	T59	T55					
Women's British Open	T22	CUT	CUT	CUT		T50	T67			CUT		

Top 10
Did not play

LA = low amateur
CUT = missed the half-way cut
"T" = tied

=== Summary ===
Tournament	Wins	2nd	3rd	Top-5	Top-10	Top-25	Events	Cuts made
Chevron Championship	0	0	0	0	0	0	9	7
U.S. Women's Open	0	0	0	0	1	2	11	5
Women's PGA Championship	0	0	0	0	0	0	12	5
The Evian Championship	0	0	0	0	1	1	7	5
Women's British Open	0	0	0	0	0	1	10	5
Totals	0	0	0	0	2	4	49	27

- Most consecutive cuts made – 7 (twice)
- Longest streak of top-10s – 1 (twice)

== LPGA Tour career summary ==
Year	Tournaments played	Cuts made	Wins	2nd	3rd	Top 10s	Best finish	Earnings ($)	Money list rank	Scoring average	Scoring rank
2006	1	0	0	0	0	0	MC	n/a		76.00	n/a
2007	1	0	0	0	0	0	MC	n/a		76.00	n/a
2008	4	3	0	0	0	1	T10	n/a		73.50	n/a
2009	3	3	0	0	0	1	T8	38,381^{1}	n/a	72.91	n/a
2010	15	10	0	0	0	1	T7	101,013	70	73.08	78
2011	14	6	0	0	0	0	T29	34,300	103	73.87	102
2012	19	14	0	0	0	1	T7	196,360	60	72.03	35
2013	24	16	0	0	0	1	T8	197,839	62	72.80	84
2014	26	18	0	0	0	3	T9	385,313	43	71.69	41
2015	27	20	0	0	1	3	3	333,993	56	72.08	61
2016	27	17	0	0	0	3	T4	291,251	63	72.32	80
2017	22	11	0	0	0	0	T11	110,296	98	72.35	116
2018	25	15	0	0	0	2	T7	207,131	77	72.36	106
2019	18	10	0	0	0	0	T11	141,334	93	72.00	100
2020	3	1	0	0	0	0	T45	7,738	157	73.50	n/a
2021	3	1	0	0	0	0	T77	2,725	187	74.00	n/a
2022	9	1	0	0	0	0	T28	6,668	191	0.00	n/a
2023	16	7	0	0	0	0	T27	65,023	147	72.72	136
2024	3	0	0	0	0	0	MC	0	n/a	74.67	n/a

^{1} Uribe played the first of her three events in 2009 as an amateur.
Official through the 2024 season

== Team appearances ==
Amateur

- Espirito Santo Trophy (representing Colombia): 2006, 2008
