= Golf at the 2014 Central American and Caribbean Games =

- Venue: Punta Tiburon Residencial Marina and Golf
- Location: Veracruz, Mexico
- Dates: 26–29 November
- Competitors: 11 men and 7 women from 11 nations

The golf competition at the 2014 Central American and Caribbean Games was held in Veracruz, Mexico. The tournament was held from 26–29 November at the Punta Tiburon Residencial Marina and Golf.

== Medal summary ==
Event	Gold	Silver	Bronze
Men	Roberto Díaz (MEX)	José de Jesús Rodríguez (MEX)	Jose Enrique Menedez (CRC)
Women	Mariajo Uribe (COL)	Alejandra Llaneza (MEX)	Paola Moreno (COL)

== Medal table ==
* Host nation (Mexico)

Rank	Nation	Gold	Silver	Bronze	Total
1	Mexico (MEX)*	1	2	0	3
2	Colombia (COL)	1	0	1	2
3	Costa Rica (CRC)	0	0	1	1
Totals (3 entries)		2	2	2	6
