= Golf at the 2018 Central American and Caribbean Games =

- Venue: Cancha Del Country Club
- Location: Barranquilla, Colombia
- Dates: 30 July – 2 August
- Competitors: 11 men and 10 women from 9 nations

The golf competition at the 2018 Central American and Caribbean Games was held in Barranquilla, Colombia from 30 July to 2 August at the Cancha Del Country Club.

== Medal summary ==
| Event | Gold | Silver | Bronze |
|---|---|---|---|
| Men | Marcelo Rozo (COL) | Raúl Pereda (MEX) | Jorge García (VEN) |
| Women | Alazne Urizar (VEN) | María Serrano (COL) | Paula Hurtado (COL) |

== Medal table ==
* Host nation (Colombia)

| Rank | Nation | Gold | Silver | Bronze | Total |
|---|---|---|---|---|---|
| 1 | Colombia (COL)* | 1 | 1 | 1 | 3 |
| 2 | Venezuela (VEN) | 1 | 0 | 1 | 2 |
| 3 | Mexico (MEX) | 0 | 1 | 0 | 1 |
| Totals (3 entries) | | 2 | 2 | 2 | 6 |
