= Postbank Challenge =

Tournament information
- Location: Mülheim an der Ruhr, Germany
- Established: 2007
- Course: Golfclub Mülheim an der Ruhr
- Par: 71
- Length: 6,662 yards (6,092 m)
- Tour: Challenge Tour
- Format: Stroke play
- Prize fund: €140,000
- Month played: August
- Final year: 2007

Tournament record score
- Aggregate: 266 Felipe Aguilar (2007); 266 Andrew McArthur (2007); 266 Paul Waring (2007)
- To par: −18 as above

Final champion
- (Chile) Felipe Aguilar
- Location in Germany Location in North Rhine-Westphalia

The Postbank Challenge was a golf tournament on the Challenge Tour that was played in 2007 at Golfclub Mülheim an der Ruhr near Mülheim, Germany. It was hosted by European Tour player Marcel Siem.

== Winners ==
Year	Winner	Score	To par	Margin of victory	Runners-up
2007	(Chile) Felipe Aguilar	266	−18	Playoff	(Scotland) Andrew McArthur (England) Paul Waring
