= Golf at the Pan American Games =

- No. of events: 3 (men: 1; women: 1; mixed: 1)

Golf became part of the Pan American Games for the first time at the 2015 Games in Toronto, Canada. The Games had an individual event for each gender and a mixed-team competition. In the latter, the low female and low male score each day counted toward the team total.

Colombia swept all three gold medals at the first edition.

== Results ==
=== Men's individual ===
Event	Gold	Silver	Bronze
2015 Toronto	Marcelo Rozo; Colombia	Tommy Cocha; Argentina	Felipe Aguilar; Chile
2019 Lima	Fabrizio Zanotti; Paraguay	José Toledo; Guatemala	Mito Pereira; Chile
2023 Santiago	Abraham Ancer; Mexico	Sebastián Muñoz; Colombia	Dylan Menante; United States

=== Women's individual ===
Event	Gold	Silver	Bronze
2015 Toronto	Mariajo Uribe; Colombia	Andrea Lee; United States	Julieta Granada; Paraguay
2019 Lima	Emilia Migliaccio; United States	Julieta Granada; Paraguay	Paula Hurtado; Colombia
2023 Santiago	Sofia García; Paraguay	Mariajo Uribe; Colombia	Alena Sharp; Canada

=== Mixed team ===
Event	Gold	Silver	Bronze
2015 Toronto	Colombia; Mateo Gómez; Paola Moreno; Marcelo Rozo; Mariajo Uribe	United States; Kristen Gillman; Beau Hossler; Andrea Lee; Lee McCoy	Argentina; Tomás Cocha; Manuela Carbajo Re; Delfina Acosta; Alejandro Tosti
2019 Lima	United States; Stewart Hagestad; Emilia Migliaccio; Brandon Wu; Rose Zhang	Paraguay; Carlos Franco; Sofia García; Julieta Granada; Fabrizio Zanotti	Canada; Austin Connelly; Mary Parsons; Joey Savoie; Brigitte Thibault

== Medal table ==
Updated after the 2023 Pan American Games.

Rank	Nation	Gold	Silver	Bronze	Total
1	Colombia	3	2	1	6
2	Paraguay	2	2	1	5
2	United States	2	2	1	5
4	Mexico	1	0	0	1
5	Argentina	0	1	1	2
6	Guatemala	0	1	0	1
7	Canada	0	0	2	2
7	Chile	0	0	2	2
Totals (8 entries)		8	8	8	24
