= Ethan Tracy =

American golfer (born 1989)

Personal information
- Full name: Ethan Nathaniel Tracy
- Nationality: United States
- Born: November 10, 1989 (age 36) Columbus, Ohio, U.S.
- Height: 5 ft 11 in (1.80 m)
- Weight: 160 lb (73 kg; 11 st)

Career
- Sport: Golf
- College: University of Arkansas
- Turned professional: 2012
- Current tour: Web.com Tour
- Former tours: PGA Tour; PGA Tour Canada; PGA Tour Latinoamérica
- Professional wins: 3

Number of wins by tour
- Korn Ferry Tour: 1
- Other: 2

Best results in major championships
- Masters Tournament: DNP
- PGA Championship: DNP
- U.S. Open: T65: 2016
- The Open Championship: DNP

Ethan Nathaniel Tracy (born November 10, 1989) is an American professional golfer.

== Scholastic career ==
Tracy attended Hilliard Darby High School and in college competed for the Arkansas Razorbacks where he was all-Southeastern Conference.

== Amateur career ==
Tracy won the 2011 Western Amateur.

== Professional career ==
Tracy has four mini-tour wins.

Tracy played the 2015 season on PGA Tour Canada (best finish – T7 at the Bayview Place Island Savings Open) and PGA Tour Latinoamérica (best finish – T2 at the Lexus Panama Classic). He finished 22nd on the Canadian money list and 40th on the Latinoamérican list.

At the 2016 U.S. Open, he made the cut and finished tied for 65th.

== Professional wins (3) ==
=== Web.com Tour wins (1) ===
No.	Date	Tournament	Winning score	To par	Margin of victory	Runner-up
1	Feb 12, 2017	Club Colombia Championship	69-69-68-65=271	−13	Playoff	(Mexico) Roberto Díaz

Web.com Tour playoff record (1–0)

No.	Year	Tournament	Opponent	Result
1	2017	Club Colombia Championship	(Mexico) Roberto Díaz	Won with birdie on second extra hole

=== eGolf Professional Tour wins (2) ===
No.	Date	Tournament	Winning score	To par	Margin of victory	Runner-up
1	Mar 1, 2014	Palmetto Hall Championship	70-65-72=207	−9	Playoff	(United States) Mike Furci
2	Aug 30, 2014	River Hills Championship	70-70-66-66=272	−12	2 strokes	(United States) Ryan Nelson

== Results in major championships ==
Tournament	2016
Masters Tournament	
U.S. Open	T65
The Open Championship	
PGA Championship	

Did not play

CUT = missed the half-way cut
"T" indicates a tie for a place

== See also ==
- 2017 Web.com Tour Finals graduates
