= Jonathan Randolph =

American professional golfer (born 1988)

Personal information
- Full name: Jonathan Evan Randolph
- Nationality: United States
- Born: August 10, 1988 (age 38) Brandon, Mississippi, U.S.
- Height: 6 ft 0 in (1.83 m)
- Weight: 210 lb (95 kg; 15 st)

Career
- Sport: Golf
- College: University of Mississippi
- Turned professional: 2011
- Current tour: Web.com Tour
- Former tour: PGA Tour
- Professional wins: 4

Best results in major championships
- Masters Tournament: DNP
- PGA Championship: DNP
- U.S. Open: T42: 2017
- The Open Championship: DNP

Jonathan Evan Randolph (born August 10, 1988) is an American professional golfer.

Randolph was an All-American at the University of Mississippi.

After turning pro in 2011, he played on the NGA Pro Golf Tour until earning a 2014 Web.com Tour card through Q School. He had four top-five finishes on the Web.com Tour in 2014 and finished 16th on the regular-season money list, earning a PGA Tour card for 2015. In May 2014, he came in second at the Web.com Tour's BMW Charity Pro-Am, to fellow rookie Max Homa by one stroke. During his rookie PGA Tour season, he had only one top-25 finish in 25 events and missed 14 cuts. He finished 179th in FedEx Cup points and failed to regain his card at the Web.com Tour Finals.

Randolph earned full status on the 2016 Web.com Tour through Q School, and after another strong Web.com Tour season regained his PGA Tour card for 2017 by finishing 13th on the regular-season money list.

Randolph earned his card for the 2018 PGA Tour season with his T-2 finish at the Albertsons Boise Open in the Web.com Tour Finals.

== Professional wins (4) ==
- 2012 Terry Moore Ford Classic, Woodcreek Classic (NGA Pro Golf Tour), Firewheel at Garland Classic (Adams Pro Tour)
- 2013 Eagle's Landing Classic (NGA Pro Golf Tour)

== U.S. national team appearances ==
- Palmer Cup: 2010 (winners)

== See also ==
- 2014 Web.com Tour Finals graduates
- 2016 Web.com Tour Finals graduates
- 2017 Web.com Tour Finals graduates
