= Alejandro Tosti =

Argentine professional golfer (born 1996)

Personal information
- Full name: Alejandro Lautaro Tosti
- Nationality: Argentina
- Born: 30 May 1996 (age 30) Rosario, Santa Fe, Argentina
- Height: 5 ft 6 in (168 cm)
- Weight: 170 lb (77 kg)

Career
- Sport: Golf
- College: University of Florida
- Turned professional: 2018
- Current tour: PGA Tour
- Former tours: Korn Ferry Tour; PGA Tour Latinoamérica; TPG Tour
- Professional wins: 5
- Highest ranking: 96 (23 June 2024) (as of 25 October 2026)

Number of wins by tour
- Korn Ferry Tour: 1
- Other: 4

Best results in major championships
- Masters Tournament: DNP
- PGA Championship: T73: 2024
- U.S. Open: CUT: 2026
- The Open Championship: DNP
Medal record
Pan American Games
Bronze medal – third place	2015 Toronto	Mixed team

Alejandro Lautaro Tosti (born 30 May 1996) is an Argentine professional golfer who plays on the PGA Tour.

== Amateur career ==
Tosti had a successful amateur career and was low amateur at the 2012 Open de Argentina with a score of 69-73-69-70. He was runner-up at the 2013 South American Junior Championship, and the 2015 Latin America Amateur Championship with a score of 69-70-68-71.

He represented Argentina at the 2014 Eisenhower Trophy, where his team finished 5th and he finished runner-up individually, three strokes behind Jon Rahm. He won bronze medal (mixed team) at the 2015 Pan American Games in Toronto, Canada, and was a semi-finalist at The Amateur Championship in 2017.

Tosti attended the University of Florida between 2014 and 2018, where he played with the Florida Gators men's golf team. He was an All-American and won three tournaments, including the individual conference championship in 2017, the first Gator since Billy Horschel in 2009.

== Professional career ==
Tosti turned professional after graduating in 2018 and joined the PGA Tour Latinoamérica. In 2019, he won his first title, and in 2022 he won a second title and finished 5th in the Order of Merit, to earn graduation to the Korn Ferry Tour.

He gained media attention after accepting a shuttle ride, believing it was an official courtesy car, from the 18th green to the first tee mid-round at the LECOM Suncoast Classic, receiving a two-shot penalty for breaking an obscure model local rule that says players may not use transportation during a round.

In August 2023, Tosti claimed his first win on the Korn Ferry Tour at the Pinnacle Bank Championship and rose into the top-100 of the OWGR for the first time, also claiming a card for the 2024 PGA Tour season. Two weeks later, he was forced to withdraw from the Albertsons Boise Open following an undisclosed disciplinary matter.

On the PGA Tour, he was runner-up at the 2024 Texas Children's Houston Open and 2025 Corales Puntacana Championship. Tosti, who has earned a reputation for being muy picante, found himself in the media concerning controversies at the 2024 Sony Open, 2024 Wells Fargo Championship, 2025 Houston Open and 2026 Valspar Championship, before it was widely reported when his caddie quit on him mid-way through the first round of the 2026 Biltmore Championship Asheville, over an umbrella dispute.

== Amateur wins ==
- 2011 Torneo Abierto Jockey Club de Rosario, Campeonato Argentino De Menores
- 2012 Torneo Abierto Jockey Club de Rosario
- 2013 Torneo Final Del Ranking De Jugadores
- 2014 Campeonato Nacional Por Golpes
- 2015 Homewood Hilton Airport Invite
- 2016 Tavistock Collegiate Invitational
- 2017 SEC Conference Championship, Carpet Capital Collegiate

== Professional wins (5) ==
=== Korn Ferry Tour wins (1) ===
No.	Date	Tournament	Winning score	Margin of victory	Runners-up
1	13 Aug 2023	Pinnacle Bank Championship	−19 (63-71-69-62=265)	3 strokes	(United States) Max Greyserman, (United States) John VanDerLaan

=== PGA Tour Latinoamérica wins (2) ===
No.	Date	Tournament	Winning score	Margin of victory	Runner(s)-up
1	3 Nov 2019	Termas de Río Hondo Invitational	−22 (68-64-66-68=266)	5 strokes	(Spain) Mario Beltrán, (United States) Justin Suh
2	3 Apr 2022	Abierto del Centro	−14 (71-66-68-69=274)	8 strokes	(Argentina) Clodomiro Carranza

=== TPG Tour wins (2) ===
No.	Date	Tournament	Winning score	Margin of victory	Runner-up
1	17 Dec 2022	Abierto del Litoral	−12 (66-68-67-67=268)	1 stroke	(Argentina) Nelson Ledesma
2	21 Dec 2024	Abierto del Litoral (2)	−26 (63-65-68-62=258)	6 strokes	(Argentina) Augusto Núñez

== Results in major championships ==
Tournament	2024	2025	2026
Masters Tournament			
PGA Championship	T73		
U.S. Open			CUT
The Open Championship			

Did not play

CUT = missed the half-way cut
"T" = tied

== Results in The Players Championship ==
Tournament	2025
The Players Championship	CUT

CUT = missed the half-way cut

== Team appearances ==
Amateur

- Junior Golf World Cup (representing Argentina): 2012
- Eisenhower Trophy (representing Argentina): 2014, 2016

== See also ==
- 2023 Korn Ferry Tour graduates
- 2024 PGA Tour Qualifying School graduates
- 2025 PGA Tour Qualifying School graduates
