= Roberto Díaz (golfer) =

Mexican professional golfer

Personal information
- Nationality: Mexico
- Born: 3 February 1987 (age 39) Veracruz, Mexico
- Height: 5 ft 6 in (168 cm)
- Weight: 180 lb (82 kg)

Career
- Sport: Golf
- College: University of South Carolina Aiken
- Turned professional: 2009
- Current tour: Korn Ferry Tour
- Former tours: PGA Tour; PGA Tour Latinoamérica
- Professional wins: 2

Number of wins by tour
- Korn Ferry Tour: 1
- Other: 1

Best results in major championships
- Masters Tournament: DNP
- PGA Championship: DNP
- U.S. Open: CUT: 2017, 2025
- The Open Championship: DNP
Medal record
Summer Universiade
| Silver medal – second place | 2007 Bangkok | Men's team |
Central American and Caribbean Games
| Gold medal – first place | 2014 Barranquilla | Individual |

Roberto Díaz (born 3 February 1987) is a Mexican professional golfer. He currently plays on the Korn Ferry Tour. He played collegiate golf for USC Aiken from 2005 to 2008 before turning professional in 2009.

== Professional career ==
In 2017, Díaz lost in a playoff to Ethan Tracy at the Club Colombia Championship. The finish moved him from outside the top 700 in the Official World Golf Ranking to 462nd, which qualified him for the WGC-Mexico Championship by being the highest-ranked Mexican golfer. Díaz also qualified for the U.S. Open, his first major championship, when Phil Mickelson withdrew to attend his daughter's high school graduation. He would go on to shoot 72-76 to miss the cut. Diaz finished 25th in the 2017 Web.com Tour rankings, the last guaranteed position for a PGA Tour card.

After the 2018-19 PGA Tour season, Diaz lost his tour card and returned to the Korn Ferry Tour.

In March 2021, Diaz won the Chitimacha Louisiana Open on the Korn Ferry Tour by one stroke over Peter Uihlein.

== Professional wins (2) ==
=== Korn Ferry Tour wins (1) ===
| No. | Date | Tournament | Winning score | Margin of victory | Runner-up |
|---|---|---|---|---|---|
| 1 | 21 Mar 2021 | Chitimacha Louisiana Open | −18 (69-65-64-68=266) | 1 stroke | (United States) Peter Uihlein |

Korn Ferry Tour playoff record (0–1)

| No. | Year | Tournament | Opponent | Result |
|---|---|---|---|---|
| 1 | 2017 | Club Colombia Championship | (United States) Ethan Tracy | Lost to birdie on second extra hole |

=== Other wins (1) ===
| No. | Date | Tournament | Winning score | Margin of victory | Runner-up |
|---|---|---|---|---|---|
| 1 | 29 Nov 2014 | Central American and Caribbean Games | −17 (271) | 3 strokes | (Mexico) José de Jesús Rodríguez |

== Results in major championships ==
| Tournament | 2017 | 2018 |
|---|---|---|
| Masters Tournament | | |
| U.S. Open | CUT | |
| The Open Championship | | |
| PGA Championship | | |

| Tournament | 2019 | 2020 | 2021 | 2022 | 2023 | 2024 | 2025 |
|---|---|---|---|---|---|---|---|
| Masters Tournament | | | | | | | |
| PGA Championship | | | | | | | |
| U.S. Open | | | | | | | CUT |
| The Open Championship | | NT | | | | | |

Did not play

CUT = missed the half-way cut
NT = no tournament due to COVID-19 pandemic

== Results in World Golf Championships ==
| Tournament | 2017 |
|---|---|
| Championship | T67 |
| Match Play | |
| Invitational | |
| Champions | |

Did not play

"T" = Tied

== Team appearances ==
Amateur

- Eisenhower Trophy (representing Mexico): 2006, 2008

Professional

- World Cup (representing Mexico): 2018

== See also ==
- 2017 Web.com Tour Finals graduates
- 2018 Web.com Tour Finals graduates
