= Paola Moreno =

Colombian professional golfer (born 1985)

Personal information
- Full name: Paola Moreno Perez
- Nationality: Colombia
- Born: 22 August 1985 (age 41) Cali, Colombia
- Height: 5 ft 6 in (168 cm)

Career
- Sport: Golf
- College: University of Southern California
- Turned professional: 2009
- Current tour: Symetra Tour
- Former tour: LPGA Tour
- Professional wins: 3

Number of wins by tour
- Epson Tour: 3

Best results in LPGA major championships
- Chevron Championship: DNP
- Women's PGA C'ship: T47: 2010
- U.S. Women's Open: T42: 2008
- Women's British Open: CUT: 2013
- Evian Championship: CUT: 2013
Medal record
Women's golf
Representing Colombia
Pan American Games
Gold medal – first place	2015 Toronto	Mixed team

Paola Moreno Perez (born 22 August 1985) is a Colombian professional golfer.

== Amateur career ==
Moreno played college golf at the University of Southern California where she was on the 2008 NCAA Division I Championship team. She was a two-time All-American. As an amateur, she finished T42 at the 2008 U.S. Women's Open.

== Professional career ==
Moreno has won three times on the Symetra Tour. She finished 2nd on the 2012 Symetra Tour money list to earn her tour card to play on the 2013 LPGA Tour where she qualified for the 2013 CME Group Titleholders.

She also finished T51 at the 2013 LPGA Championship.

== International career ==
In 2014, Moreno individually took bronze in golf at the 2014 Central American and Caribbean Games.

She won a gold medal in the mixed team event at the 2015 Pan American Games.

== Amateur wins ==
- 2002 Junior World Golf Championships (Girls 15–17)
- 2004 Colombian Open, Colombian National Championship
- 2005 Colombian Open
- 2006 Colombian Open, South American Championship
- 2007 Texas A&M "Mo"Morial
- 2008 Pac-10 Championship

== Professional wins ==
=== Symetra Tour wins ===
- 2010 Texas Hill Country Classic
- 2012 Eagle Classic
- 2016 Tullymore Classic

== Team appearances ==
Amateur

- Espirito Santo Trophy (representing Colombia): 2004, 2008
