= Kristen Gillman =

American professional golfer

Personal information
- Nationality: United States
- Born: September 22, 1997 (age 29) Austin, Texas, U.S.
- Height: 5 ft 7 in (1.70 m)

Career
- Sport: Golf
- College: University of Alabama
- Turned professional: 2018
- Current tour: LPGA Tour
- Professional wins: 1

Number of wins by tour
- LPGA of Japan Tour: 1

Best results in LPGA major championships
- Chevron Championship: T6: 2019
- Women's PGA C'ship: T60: 2019
- U.S. Women's Open: T27: 2018
- Women's British Open: T11: 2019
- Evian Championship: T38: 2021

Achievements and awards
- SEC Freshman of the Year: 2016-17
Medal record
Pan American Games
Silver medal – second place	2015 Toronto	Mixed team

Kristen Gillman (born September 22, 1997) is an American professional golfer currently playing on the LPGA Tour. As an amateur, she won the U.S. Women's Amateur twice, in 2014 and 2018.

== Early life, college and amateur career ==
Gillman is one of the most-decorated junior golfers in recent U.S. history. She won the U.S. Women's Amateur in 2014 and 2018, the Junior PGA Championship in 2014 and the North and South Women's Amateur in 2016. She made a series of successful appearances for the U.S. national Team and won the 2014 Junior Ryder Cup, the 2015 Junior Solheim Cup, the 2016 Toyota Junior Golf World Cup in Japan, the 2018 Curtis Cup and the 2018 Arnold Palmer Cup at Evian Resort Golf Club in France. She also won the 2018 Espirito Santo Trophy in Ireland with Jennifer Kupcho and Lilia Vu. She won the silver medal with the Mixed team at the 2015 Pan American Games.

Gillman enrolled at the University of Alabama in 2016. She was SEC Freshman of the Year playing for Alabama Crimson Tide golf and set several school records.

As an amateur, she made six starts on the LPGA Tour, including the 2018 U.S. Women's Open, where she made her first cut and finished T27. She won the Century 21 Ladies Golf Tournament on the 2018 LPGA of Japan Tour.

== Professional career ==
Gillman turned professional in late 2018 after she finished T13 at the inaugural LPGA Q-Series to earn membership for the 2019 LPGA Tour. She made 22 cuts in 26 starts her rookie season, with a career-best T3 finish at the Buick LPGA Shanghai. She finished 43rd on the money list and second in the Rookie of the Year standings, behind Lee Jeong-eun who won the 2019 U.S. Women's Open. Gillman made the cut in three majors, including a T6 finish at the 2019 ANA Inspiration.

Gillman finished tied 11th at the 2020 Women's British Open, after which she rose to 38th in the Women's World Golf Rankings.

== Amateur wins ==
- 2013 Genesis Shootout
- 2014 Junior PGA Championship, U.S. Women's Amateur
- 2016 Bishops Gate Golf Academy Junior, Toyota Junior Golf World Cup (individual champion), Under Armour - Jordan Spieth Championship, North and South Women's Amateur
- 2017 Bryan National Collegiate, The Schooner Fall Classic
- 2018 U.S. Women's Amateur

== Professional wins (1) ==
=== LPGA of Japan Tour wins (1) ===
No.	Date	Tournament	Winning score	Margin of victory	Runners-up
1	22 Jul 2018	Century 21 Ladies Golf Tournament (as an amateur)	−17 (65-67-67=199)	4 strokes	(Japan) Ayako Kimura (Japan) Sakura Koiwai

== Results in LPGA majors ==
Results not in chronological order.

Tournament	2014	2015	2016	2017	2018	2019	2020	2021	2022	2023	2024	2025
Chevron Championship						T6	T24	T70			T62	CUT
U.S. Women's Open		CUT			T27		CUT	CUT			T36	
Women's PGA Championship						T60	CUT	CUT			CUT	CUT
The Evian Championship	CUT					CUT	NT	T38			CUT	CUT
Women's British Open		CUT				T35	T11	CUT			T49	T55

Top 10
Did not play

CUT = missed the half-way cut
NT = no tournament
T = tied

=== Summary ===
Tournament	Wins	2nd	3rd	Top-5	Top-10	Top-25	Events	Cuts made
Chevron Championship	0	0	0	0	1	2	5	4
U.S. Women's Open	0	0	0	0	0	0	5	2
Women's PGA Championship	0	0	0	0	0	0	5	1
The Evian Championship	0	0	0	0	0	0	5	1
Women's British Open	0	0	0	0	0	1	6	4
Totals	0	0	0	0	1	3	26	12

- Most consecutive cuts made – 4 (2018 U.S. Women's Open – 2019 Women's PGA)
- Longest streak of top-10s – 1 (once)

== U.S. national team appearances ==
Amateur

- Junior Ryder Cup: 2014 (winners)
- Junior Solheim Cup: 2015 (winners)
- Pan American Games: 2015
- Toyota Junior Golf World Cup: 2016 (winners)
- Curtis Cup: 2018 (winners)
- Arnold Palmer Cup: 2018 (winners)
- Espirito Santo Trophy: 2018 (winners)
