= Lee McCoy =

American professional golfer (born 1994)

Personal information
- Nationality: United States
- Born: February 5, 1994 (age 32) Dunedin, Florida, U.S.
- Height: 5 ft 11 in (1.80 m)
- Weight: 145 lb (66 kg; 10.4 st)

Career
- Sport: Golf
- College: University of Georgia
- Turned professional: 2016
- Current tour: Web.com Tour
- Former tour: PGA Tour Canada
- Professional wins: 1

Best results in major championships
- Masters Tournament: DNP
- PGA Championship: DNP
- U.S. Open: CUT: 2015
- The Open Championship: DNP
Medal record
Pan American Games
Silver medal – second place	2015 Toronto	Mixed team

Lee McCoy (born February 5, 1994) is an American professional golfer. He played his college golf at the University of Georgia and currently plays professionally on the Korn Ferry Tour. He previously played on the Mackenzie Tour-PGA Tour Canada.

== Amateur career ==
McCoy was born in Dunedin, Florida, to Terry and Cheryl McCoy. He started playing golf when he was about 18 months old and grew up in a subdivision of Innisbrook Resort and Golf Club. For his final year of high school, McCoy moved to Georgia, where he won the 2012 Class 4A state championship and was named Georgia's player of the year. McCoy played college golf at the University of Georgia; as a junior he was named a first-team All-American and was a member of the U.S. 2015 Walker Cup and Palmer Cup teams. He qualified for the 2015 U.S. Open, missing the cut. At the 2016 Valspar Championship on the PGA Tour, McCoy tied the lowest round of the tournament with a 5-under 66 in the third round, eventually finishing the tournament in fourth place. He was the individual medalist at the 2016 Southeastern Conference men's golf championship, helping Georgia win the team portion of the championship. In the 2016 NCAA Division I Men's Golf Championship, McCoy finished in a tie for sixth place out of the 84 players who completed four rounds.

== Professional career ==
McCoy turned professional after the national championship. In addition to his fourth-place finish at the Valspar, he played six additional PGA Tour events on sponsor's exemptions, missing the cut in all six. He received another sponsor's exemption to play in the 2016 Shriners Hospitals for Children Open, where he made the cut for the first time in his professional career, finishing T41. The day before the second stage of Web.com Tour qualifying school in November 2016, McCoy was in a car accident that shattered his wrist in two places. Doctors told him he was fortunate that he would be able to play golf again after the injury, as a bone in his hand could have fractured, potentially tearing all the ligaments in his hand.

In March 2017, McCoy attempted to earn status on the PGA Tour Canada. By finishing T14 in qualifying school, he earned status for at least the first four events of the season. He quickly erased any doubts about keeping his card by winning the first event of the season, the Freedom 55 Financial Open, in June. McCoy didn't do well enough to earn a Web.com Tour card, but he was medalist at the 2017 Q School, making him fully exempt on the Web.com Tour for 2018.

In June 2022, McCoy announced his retirement from golf via his twitter account, citing ongoing wrist injuries hindering him from playing professionally.

== Professional wins (1) ==
=== PGA Tour Canada wins (1) ===
No.	Date	Tournament	Winning score	To par	Margin of victory	Runners-up
1	Jun 4, 2017	Freedom 55 Financial Open	66-69-67-66=268	−20	8 strokes	(United States) Jordan Niebrugge, (United States) Hunter Stewart

== Results in major championships ==
Tournament	2015
U.S. Open	CUT

CUT = missed the half-way cut
Note: McCoy only played in the U.S. Open.

== Team appearances ==
Amateur

- Palmer Cup (representing the United States): 2015 (winners)
- Walker Cup (representing the United States): 2015

Professional

- Aruba Cup (representing PGA Tour Canada): 2017 (winners)
