= Felipe Aguilar =

Chilean professional golfer (born 1974)

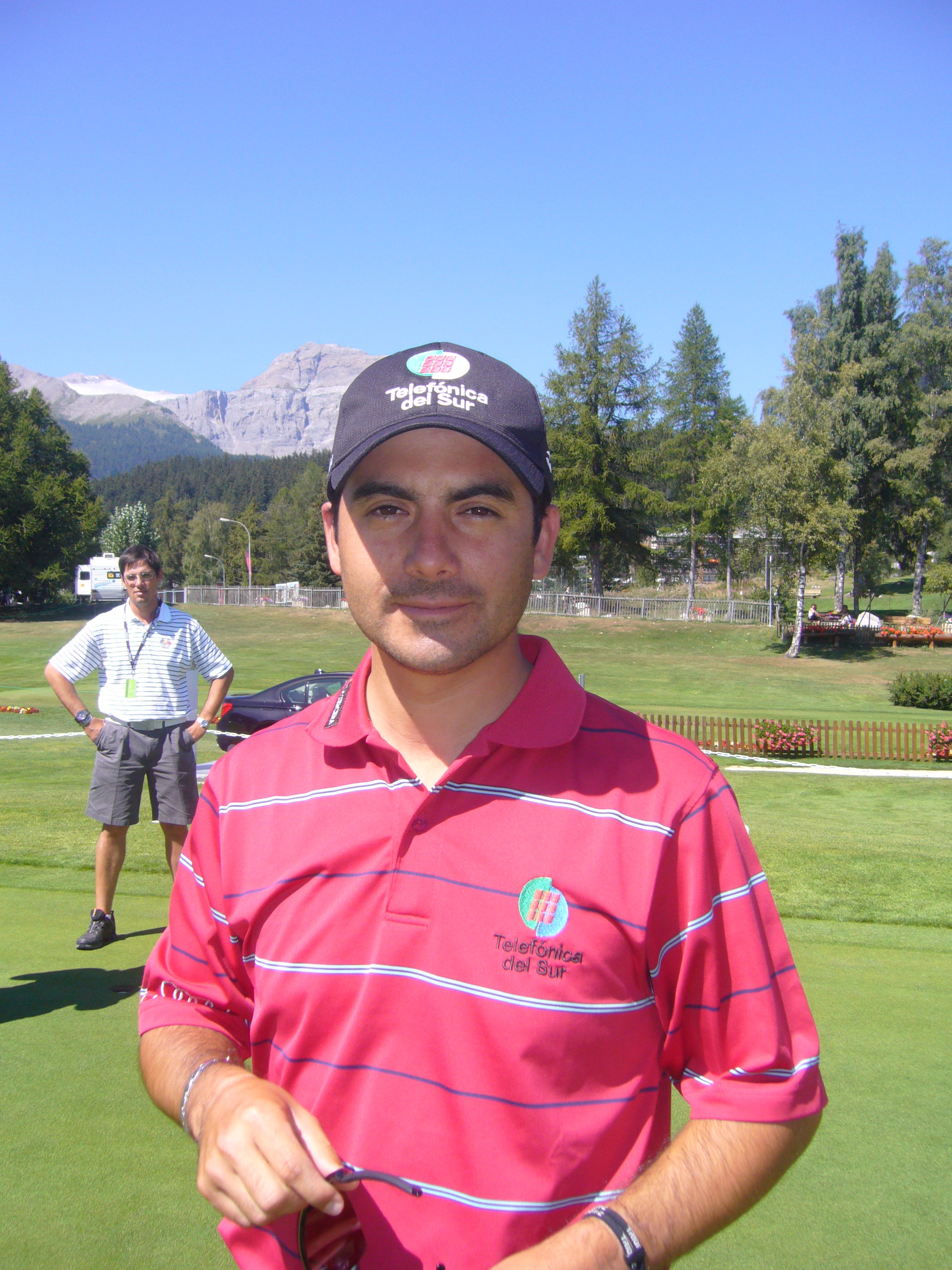
- Aguilar in August 2009

Personal information
- Full name: Felipe Andrés Aguilar Schuller
- Nationality: Chile
- Born: 7 November 1974 (age 51) Valdivia, Chile
- Height: 5 ft 7 in (1.70 m)
- Weight: 159 lb (72 kg; 11.4 st)
- Spouse: Loreto (m. 2003)
- Children: 3

Career
- Sport: Golf
- College: University of North Florida
- Turned professional: 1999
- Current tours: European Tour; Chilean Tour
- Former tours: Challenge Tour; Tour de las Américas
- Professional wins: 28
- Highest ranking: 99 (15 June 2008)

Number of wins by tour
- European Tour: 2
- Asian Tour: 2
- Challenge Tour: 2
- Other: 24
Medal record
Pan American Games
Bronze medal – third place	2015 Toronto	Individual

Felipe Andrés Aguilar Schuller (born 7 November 1974) is a Chilean professional golfer who plays on the European Tour.

== Biography ==
Aguilar was born on 7 November 1974 in Valdivia, Chile. His maternal grandfather designed golf courses in Chile after emigrating from Germany and introduced Aguilar to the sport.

== Professional career ==
In 2006, Aguilar became the second Chilean, after Roy Mackenzie, to earn full membership to the European Tour. However, he failed to retain full playing rights at the end of the season. In 2007, he won two events on the Challenge Tour in a four-week span. Due to his success on the Challenge Tour he rejoined the European Tour in 2008.

In February 2008, Aguilar won his first European Tour event at the Enjoy Jakarta Astro Indonesia Open. He birdied the final hole while the erstwhile leader Jeev Milkha Singh bogeyed for a two shot swing that saw the Chilean win by one stroke.

In April 2013, Aguilar was part of the joint longest sudden-death playoff, lasting nine extra holes, in European Tour history at the Open de España. He was eliminated at the third extra hole when he made par. He ended 50th in the Race to Dubai with eight top 10s in 27 tournaments.

In May 2014, Aguilar won his second European Tour title at The Championship at Laguna National, a co-sanctioned event with the Asian Tour. Aguilar shot a final round 62, which included a birdie-eagle finish in a 28 on the back nine to storm through the field and take a one shot victory.

Aguilar won the gold medal at the 2014 South American Games and the bronze medal at the 2015 Pan American Games

== Amateur wins ==
- 1990 Chilean Amateur Open
- 1991 Chilean Amateur Open, South American Championship
- 1992 Chilean Amateur Open

== Professional wins (28) ==
=== European Tour wins (2) ===
No.	Date	Tournament	Winning score	Margin of victory	Runner(s)-up
1	17 Feb 2008	Enjoy Jakarta Astro Indonesia Open^{1}	−18 (65-62-67-68=262)	1 stroke	(India) Jeev Milkha Singh
2	4 May 2014	The Championship at Laguna National^{1}	−22 (65-67-72-62=266)	1 stroke	(Denmark) Anders Hansen, (United States) David Lipsky

^{1}Co-sanctioned by the Asian Tour

European Tour playoff record (0–1)

No.	Year	Tournament	Opponents	Result
1	2013	Open de España	(France) Raphaël Jacquelin, (Germany) Maximilian Kieffer	Jacquelin won with birdie on ninth extra hole Aguilar eliminated by birdie on third hole

=== Challenge Tour wins (2) ===
No.	Date	Tournament	Winning score	Margin of victory	Runner(s)-up
1	26 Aug 2007	Postbank Challenge	−18 (66-66-69-65=266)	Playoff	(Scotland) Andrew McArthur, (England) Paul Waring
2	16 Sep 2007	OKI Mahou Challenge de España	−17 (71-63-70-67=271)	Playoff	(Germany) Tobias Dier

Challenge Tour playoff record (2–0)

No.	Year	Tournament	Opponent(s)	Result
1	2007	Postbank Challenge	(Scotland) Andrew McArthur, (England) Paul Waring	Won with par on second extra hole Waring eliminated by par on first hole
2	2007	OKI Mahou Challenge de España	(Germany) Tobias Dier	Won with par on first extra hole

=== Tour de las Américas wins (1) ===
No.	Date	Tournament	Winning score	Margin of victory	Runner-up
1	20 Apr 2008	Abierto de Chile	−23 (65-67-65-68=265)	11 strokes	(Argentina) Sebastián Saavedra

=== Alps Tour wins (2) ===
No.	Date	Tournament	Winning score	Margin of victory	Runner(s)-up
1	17 Jun 2003	Waldviertel Open	−11 (68-68-69=205)	3 strokes	(Italy) Emmanuele Lattanzi, (Chile) Mark Tullo
2	22 Jun 2003	Memorial Olivier Barras	−12 (68-70-69=207)	3 strokes	(Italy) Emmanuele Lattanzi

=== Chilean Tour wins (15) ===
No.	Date	Tournament	Winning score	Margin of victory	Runner(s)-up
1	6 Nov 2011	Abierto de Prince of Wales Country Club	−14 (66-67-69=202)	3 strokes	(Chile) Benjamín Alvarado
2	4 Dec 2016	Abierto de Chile	−22 (69-64-64-69=266)	4 strokes	(Argentina) Thomas Baik
3	3 Dec 2017	Abierto de Chile (2)	−9 (68-71-71-69=279)	Playoff	(Chile) Mito Pereira
4	28 Jan 2018	Abierto Rocas de Santo Domingo	−17 (72-68-64-67=271)	9 strokes	(Chile) Benjamín Alvarado
5	30 Sep 2018	Abierto Hacienda Chicureo	−11 (68-66-71=205)	Playoff	(Chile) Gabriel Morgan-Birke
6	16 Feb 2019	Abierto La Serena	−12 (69-67-68=204)	Playoff	(Chile) Gustavo Silva
7	14 Apr 2019	Abierto de Golf Los Lirios	−8 (71-71-66=208)	2 strokes	(Chile) Mark Tullo
8	26 Jan 2020	Abierto Rocas de Santo Domingo (2)	−17 (68-67-64=199)	6 strokes	(Chile) Benjamín Alvarado, (Chile) Juan Cerda
9	9 Jan 2022	Abierto de Golf de Cachagua	−7 (68-70-71=209)	2 strokes	(Chile) Nicolás Geyger, (Chile) Mark Tullo
10	24 Apr 2022	Abierto de Golf Los Lirios (2)	−8 (69-72-67=208)	1 stroke	(Chile) Benjamín Alvarado
11	2 Oct 2022	Abierto Brisas de Chicureo	−9 (72-68-67=207)	2 strokes	(Chile) Agustín Errázuriz
12	22 Jan 2023	Abierto Rocas de Santo Domingo (3)	−13 (68-70-65=203)	2 strokes	(Chile) Gustavo Silva
13	16 Apr 2023	Abierto Las Araucarias	−10 (66-67-70=203)	Playoff	(Chile) Agustín Errázuriz
14	16 Dec 2023	Abierto del Club de Polo y Equitación San Cristóbal	−14 (69-63-70=202)	1 stroke	(Chile) Gabriel Morgan-Birke
15	12 Jan 2025	Abierto de Golf de Cachagua (2)	−11 (70-68-67=205)	3 strokes	(Chile) Carlos Bustos, (Chile) Philippe Guidi, (Chile) Benjamín Saiz-Wenz

=== FG Sports Tour wins (4) ===
No.	Date	Tournament	Winning score	Margin of victory	Runner-up
1	6 Mar 2022	6° Fecha	−11 (68-67-70=205)	1 stroke	(Chile) Benjamín Saiz-Wenz
2	18 Jun 2023	14° Fecha	−12 (67-67-70=204)	Playoff	(Chile) Agustín Errázuriz
3	15 Jul 2023	15° Fecha	−15 (68-69-64=201)	7 strokes	(Chile) Gabriel Morgan-Birke
4	7 Jul 2024	21° Fecha	−8 (74-69-65=208)	2 strokes	(Chile) Antonio Costa

=== Other wins (2) ===
- 2002 Chile Open
- 2003 Copa de Naciones (with Roy Mackenzie)

== Results in World Golf Championships ==
Tournament	2014
Match Play	
Championship	
Invitational	
Champions	T48

Did not play

"T" = Tied

== Team appearances ==
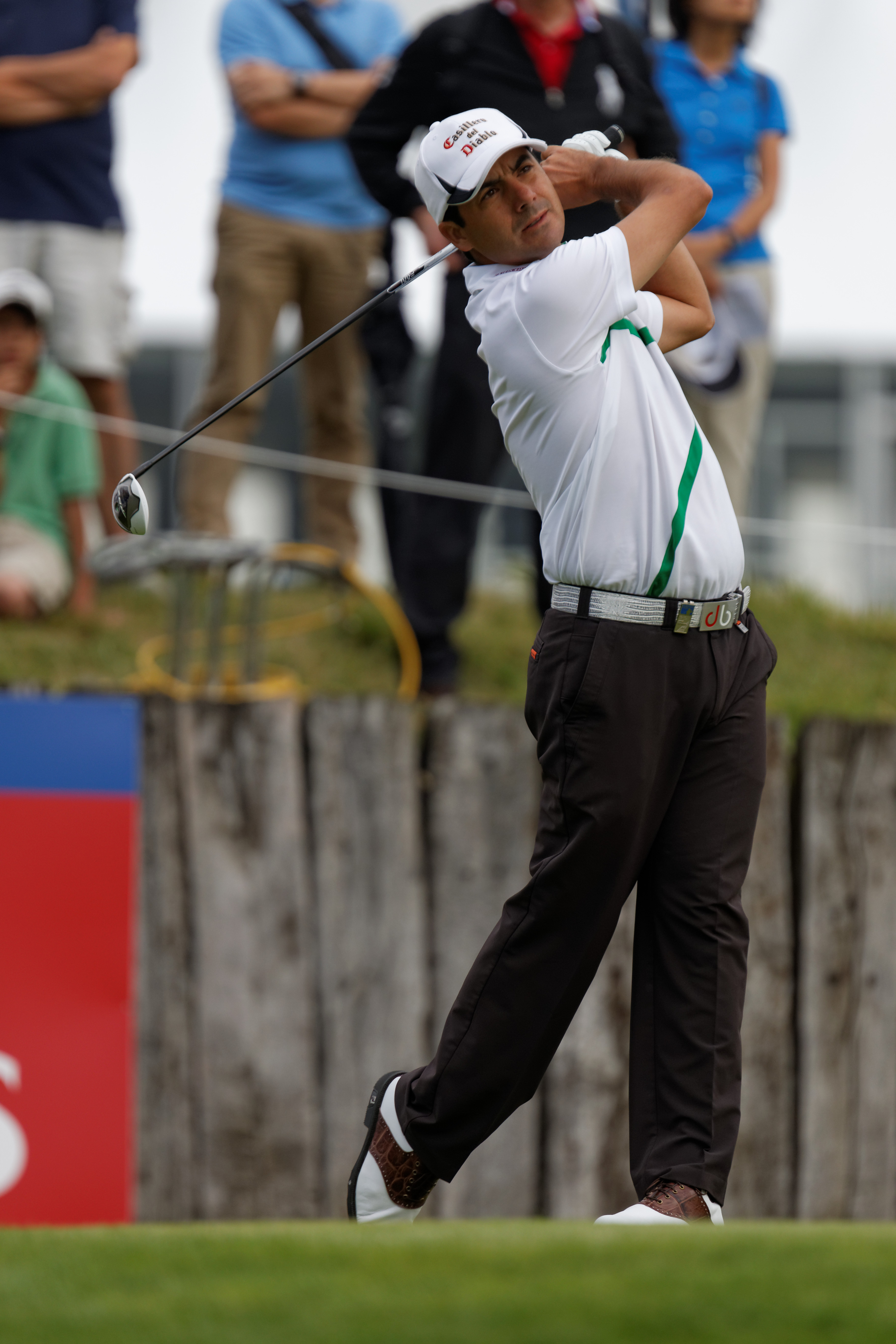
Felipe Aguilar

Amateur

- Eisenhower Trophy (representing Chile): 1996, 1998

Professional

- World Cup (representing Chile): 2003, 2008, 2013

== See also ==
- 2005 European Tour Qualifying School graduates
- 2007 Challenge Tour graduates
- 2017 European Tour Qualifying School graduates
