= Beau Hossler =

American professional golfer (born 1995)

Personal information
- Nationality: United States
- Born: March 16, 1995 (age 31) Mission Viejo, California, U.S.
- Height: 6 ft 1 in (1.85 m)
- Weight: 195 lb (88 kg; 13.9 st)

Career
- Sport: Golf
- College: University of Texas
- Turned professional: 2016
- Current tour: PGA Tour
- Former tour: Korn Ferry Tour
- Highest ranking: 63 (February 18, 2024) (as of October 25, 2026)

Best results in major championships
- Masters Tournament: DNP
- PGA Championship: T19: 2025
- U.S. Open: T29: 2012
- The Open Championship: T75: 2018

Achievements and awards
- Haskins Award: 2016
Medal record
Pan American Games
Silver medal – second place	2015 Toronto	Mixed team

Beau Hossler (born March 16, 1995) is an American professional golfer from Rancho Santa Margarita, California who has played on the PGA Tour and won the Haskins Award in college as the top collegiate golfer in the US. He qualified for the U.S. Open twice as a teen, finishing tied for 29th in the 2012 U.S. Open after holding the outright lead midway through the second round.

== Early life ==
Hossler was born on March 16, 1995. He graduated from Santa Margarita Catholic High School.

== Amateur career ==
In 2013, Hossler started attending the University of Texas on a golf scholarship. He won numerous awards and tournaments while playing for the Texas Longhorns men's golf.

In his freshman year, he was named the Big 12 Newcomer of the Year and an Honorable Mention All-American while coming in 3rd in the Big 12 and 35th at the NCAA Championship.

In his sophomore year, he won the Johnny Hayt Collegiate Invitational, was an All-American, All-Big 12, the Big 12 Player of the year, made the Ben Hogan Award watch list, and the All-Nicklaus team while finishing tied for 2nd in the Big 12 and 5th at the NCAA Championship.

In his junior year, he won five tournaments (3rd most single season wins in UT golf history): The Nike Golf Collegiate Invitational, The Arizona Intercollegiate, the John A. Burns Intercollegiate, the Lamkin Classic and the Augusta Invitational. He was again was an All-American, All-Big 12 and the Big 12 Player of the year. He won the Fred Haskins Award as the most outstanding collegiate golfer in the United States, was a Ben Hogan Award finalist, and a Jack Nicklaus Award semifinalist while finishing tied for 2nd in the Big 12 again and 5th at the NCAA Championship.

During his time at Texas, they won the Big 12 Championship and made it to the NCAA Championship all three years, finishing in 13th and tied for 5th in his first two years. In his junior year, the Longhorns had the best score after the 54 hole round and made it to the Championship match where they were upset by Oregon. He also made both the Walker Cup and Palmer Cup teams and qualified for the U.S. Open for the 3rd time, and tied for 58th place.

== Professional career ==
Hossler turned professional in 2016 with one year of college eligibility left.

In June 2017, Hossler secured one of twelve open qualifying places for the Air Capital Classic on the Web.com Tour. He finished second, enabling him to play more Web.com Tour tournaments that season. He finished the regular season in 23rd place in the rankings, earning promotion to the PGA Tour.

In April 2018, Hossler lost in a sudden-death playoff at the Houston Open to Ian Poulter. He was co-leader after 54 holes and led the tournament by a stroke on the final hole, before Poulter birdied to force a playoff. On the first extra hole, Hossler hit his bunker shot into the water, resulting in a triple bogey to lose the playoff.

He lost another playoff to Kevin Yu who birdied the first extra hole in the Sanderson Farms Championship in 2024.

He also finished 2nd in the 2018 Travelers Championship, the 2023 Zozo Championship and the 2026 Wyndham Championship. In the Wyndham he led after both day 2 and day 3 and needed the win to make the FedEx playoffs.

== Amateur wins ==
- 2010 Trader Joe's Junior Championship, Stockton Sports Commission Junior
- 2011 Callaway Junior World Golf Championships (boys 15–17)
- 2012 Winn Grips Heather Farr Classic
- 2013 Southern California Amateur
- 2014 Southern California Amateur, Western Amateur
- 2015 John Hayt Collegiate Invitational, Nike Collegiate Invite
- 2016 Arizona Intercollegiate, Jones Cup Invitational, John Burns Intercollegiate, Lamkin Grips SD Classic, 3M Augusta Invitational

== Playoff record ==
PGA Tour playoff record (0–2)

No.	Year	Tournament	Opponent	Result
1	2018	Houston Open	(England) Ian Poulter	Lost to par on first extra hole
2	2024	Sanderson Farms Championship	(Taiwan) Kevin Yu	Lost to birdie on first extra hole

== Results in major championships ==
Results not in chronological order in 2020.

Tournament	2011	2012	2013	2014	2015	2016	2017	2018
Masters Tournament								
U.S. Open	CUT	T29			T58			
The Open Championship								T75
PGA Championship								CUT

Tournament	2019	2020	2021	2022	2023	2024	2025
Masters Tournament							
PGA Championship	T36			T69	T40	CUT	T19
U.S. Open				T53		CUT	
The Open Championship		NT					

Did not play

CUT = missed the half-way cut
"T" indicates a tie for a place
NT = no tournament due to COVID-19 pandemic

== Results in The Players Championship ==
Tournament	2018	2019	2020	2021	2022	2023	2024	2025
The Players Championship	T46	CUT	C	CUT	CUT	CUT	CUT	T50

CUT = missed the halfway cut
"T" indicates a tie for a place
C = Canceled after the first round due to the COVID-19 pandemic

== U.S. national team appearances ==
Amateur

- Junior Ryder Cup: 2012 (winners)
- Eisenhower Trophy: 2014 (winners)
- Palmer Cup: 2015 (winners)
- Walker Cup: 2015

== See also ==
- 2017 Web.com Tour Finals graduates
- 2019 Korn Ferry Tour Finals graduates
