= Angus Glen Golf Club =

Coordinates: 43.9°N 79.3237°W

- Angus Glen logo
- Interactive map of Angus Glen Golf Club

Club information
- Location: Markham, Ontario, Canada
- Type: Public
- Tota holes: 36
- Tournaments: Canadian Open (2002, 2007)
- Website: http://www.angusglen.com/

North Course
- Par: 72
- Length: 7403 yards (Canadian Open tees)
- Course rating: 74.6 (Canadian Open tees)

South Course
- Par: 72
- Length: 7407 yards (Canadian Open tees)
- Course rating: 76.0 (Canadian Open tees)
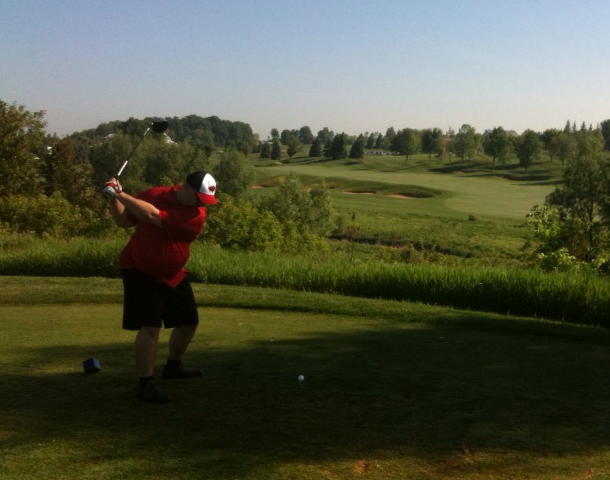
- Teeing off at the 9th hole, South Course

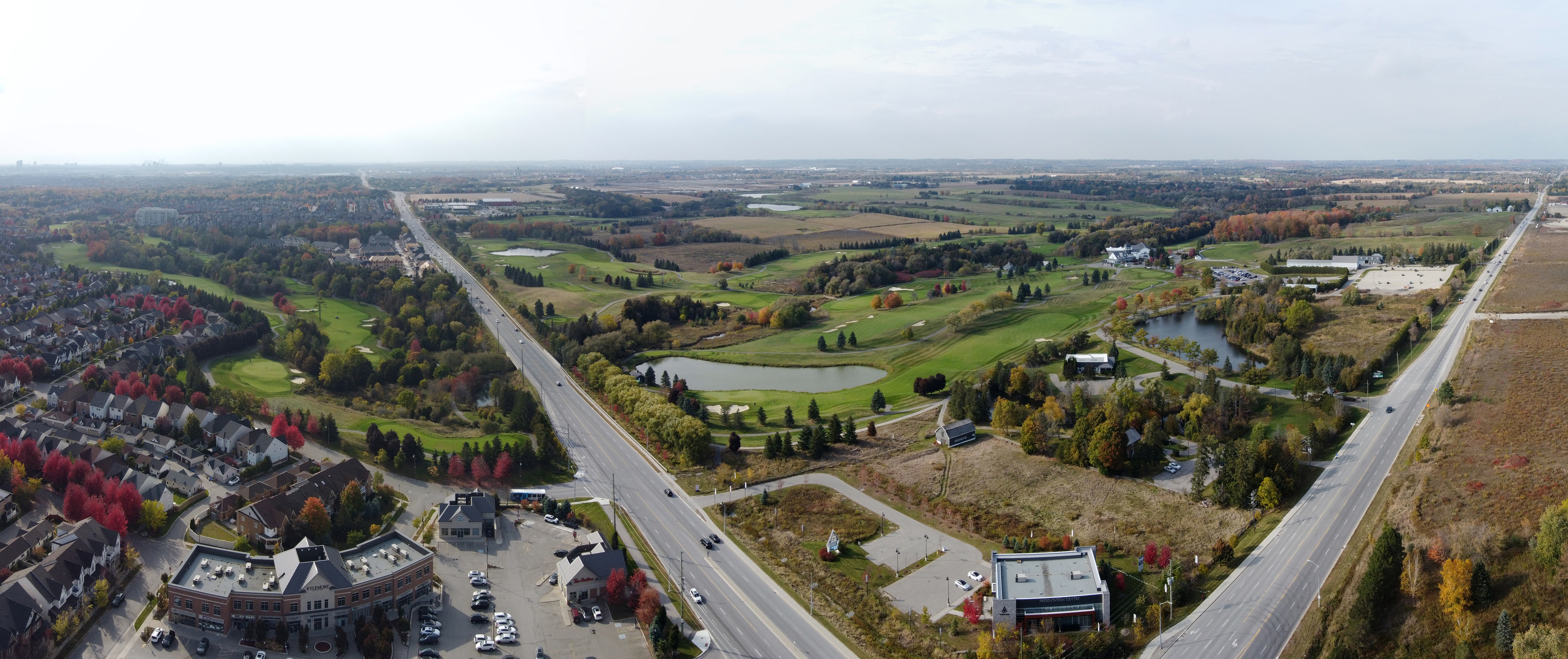
Aerial view of Angus Glen Golf Club

The Angus Glen Golf Club consists of two 18-hole championship golf courses in Markham, Ontario, Canada.

== History ==
The club was built on what was originally the Angus Glen Farm owned by mining magnate Arthur Stollery who bred Black Aberdeen Angus cattle as well as Thoroughbred horses that he raced. The farm was converted into a golf course by his son Gordon, also a mining magnate, with the South Course opening in 1995. That year, the South Course was named the best new golf course in Canada by Golf Digest. The North Course later opened in 2001.

The name of the course has been used for the community of homes by Kylemore Communities called "West Village At Angus Glen". The community ranges from townhouses to mansions built next to holes 2-5 of the South course and now developing areas around the 6th.

Renovations were made to the North Course based on designs by Davis Love III to make it more challenging. Angus Glen hosted the Canadian Open in 2002 (South Course) and again in 2007 (North Course). At the 2007 Canadian Open, the 17th and 18th holes were played on the South Course.

The course again underwent a major renovation in 2013 to prepare it to host the 2015 Pan American Games.

== Events ==
- 2001 Canadian Women's Open
- 2002 Canadian Open, won by John Rollins on the South Course
- 2007 Canadian Open, won by Jim Furyk on the North Course
- 2014, 2019, and 2022 World Junior Girls Golf Championship

== 2015 Pan American Games ==
In 2013, the south golf course of the Club was selected to host the Pan American Games debut of golf in 2015.
