= Sports in Worcester, Massachusetts =

Home to minor league sports teams

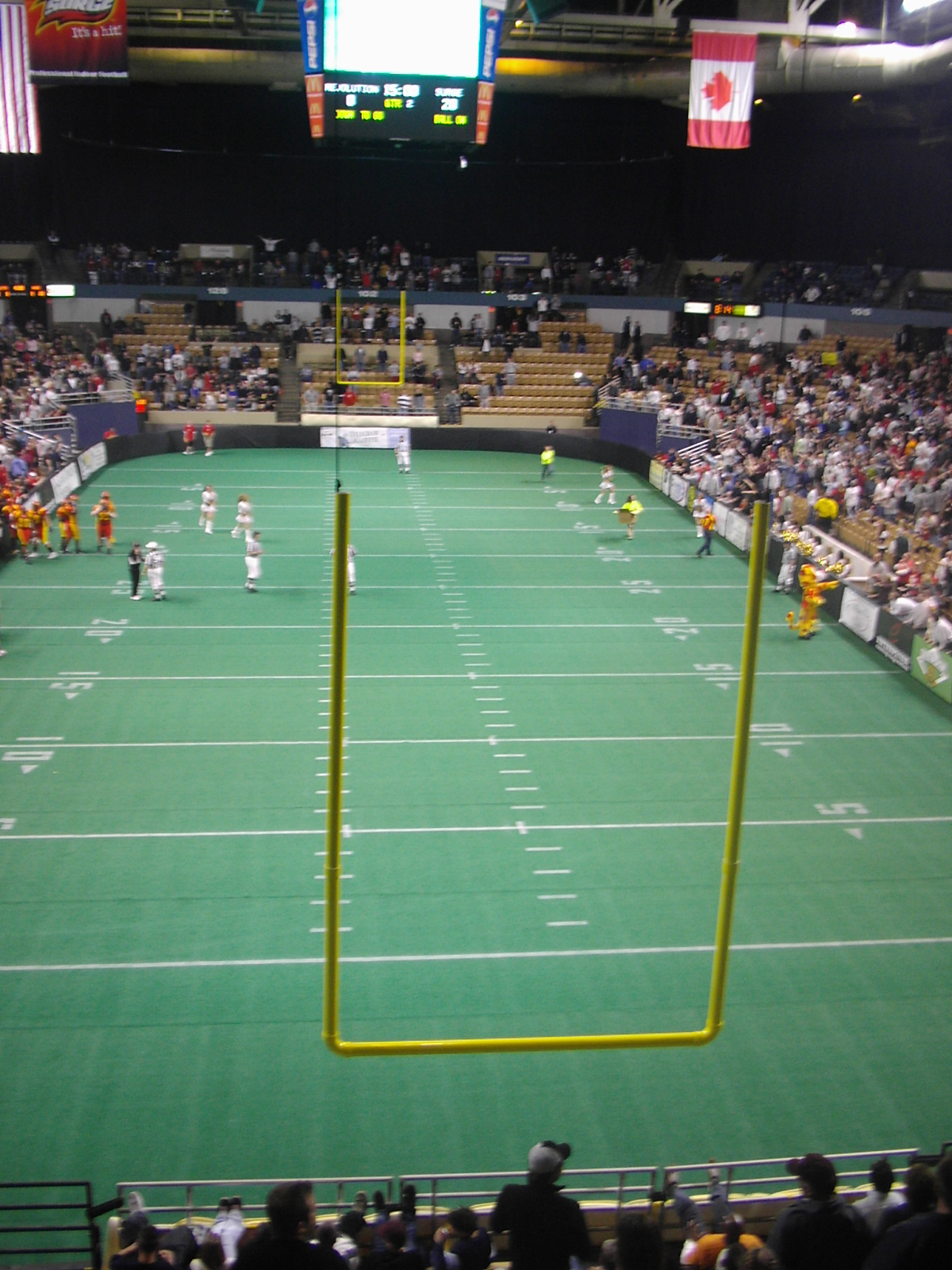
View from the endzone of the DCU Center during a New England Surge home game

Worcester, Massachusetts, is home to minor league sports teams and NCAA Division I college and university sports, most notably The College of the Holy Cross. Other professional teams that have moved on from the city include the New England Blazers, a Major League Lacrosse team that played at the Worcester Centrum during the 1980s, the Bay State Bombardiers of the Continental Basketball Association, who played in the Worcester Memorial Auditorium from 1984 to 1986, the Worcester Ice Cats, an American Hockey League franchise and developmental team for the National Hockey League's St. Louis Blues who played in the DCU Center (originally Worcester Centrum) from 1994 to 2005, and the Worcester Sharks, an American Hockey League franchise and developmental team for the NHL's San Jose Sharks. Many historic and local sporting events have occurred in Worcester such as the first official Ryder Cup golf tournament at Worcester Country Club in 1927.

Club	League	Sport	Venue	Established	Championships
Worcester Railers	ECHL	Ice hockey	DCU Center	2017	0
Massachusetts Pirates	IFL	Indoor football	DCU Center	2018	1
Worcester Bravehearts	FCBL	Baseball	Fitton Field	2014	4
Worcester County Wildcats	NEFL	American football	Commerce Bank Field at Foley Stadium	2004	0
Worcester Red Sox	IL	Baseball	Polar Park	2021	0

== History ==
=== Baseball ===
The Worcester Worcesters, an early Major League Baseball team, was one of the first teams to play in the nascent National League. This team, which operated from 1880 to 1882, is believed to be the only major league team in history not to have an attached nickname. (There are some references throughout major league history books to the team being called the "Worcester Brown Stockings", "Brownies", and "Ruby Legs". However, the Worcester Telegram sportswriter Bill Ballou, in conducting thorough research on the team for years, has found no contemporary reference to any of those nicknames.) The team's home field, the Worcester Agricultural Fairgrounds was the site of the first recorded perfect game in professional baseball. Pitcher Lee Richmond achieved this feat on June 12, 1880, against the Cleveland Blues.

In 2002, Worcester's Jesse Burkett Little League baseball team competed in the Little League World Series's U.S. Final. Though the Burkett team lost to the Little League All-Stars from Louisville, Kentucky, its second-place finish was the best in the history of Massachusetts Little League baseball.

Professional baseball in Worcester was represented by the Worcester Tornadoes baseball team, which played its first season in 2005. Though not affiliated with any Major League Baseball team, the Tornadoes played their games at Hanover Insurance Park at Fitton Field on the campus of The College of the Holy Cross and were a member of the Canadian-American Association of Professional Baseball League. The team finished its inaugural season by winning the Can-Am championship. Its last season was 2012. The team name was chosen from among 1000 entries in a two-month-long naming contest. The "Tornadoes" refers to the deadly tornado that struck Worcester and central Massachusetts in 1953.

The Worcester Bravehearts were founded in 2013 as the local affiliate of the Futures Collegiate Baseball League. The Bravehearts played in their first season in 2014 and won the FCBL Championship by sweeping the Martha's Vineyard Sharks in a best-of-three series. In the final game, the Bravehearts made a historic victory.

In Minor League Baseball, the Triple-A affiliate of the Boston Red Sox, formerly the Pawtucket Red Sox, began plan in Worcester in 2021 as the Worcester Red Sox.

=== Football ===
==== Rugby ====
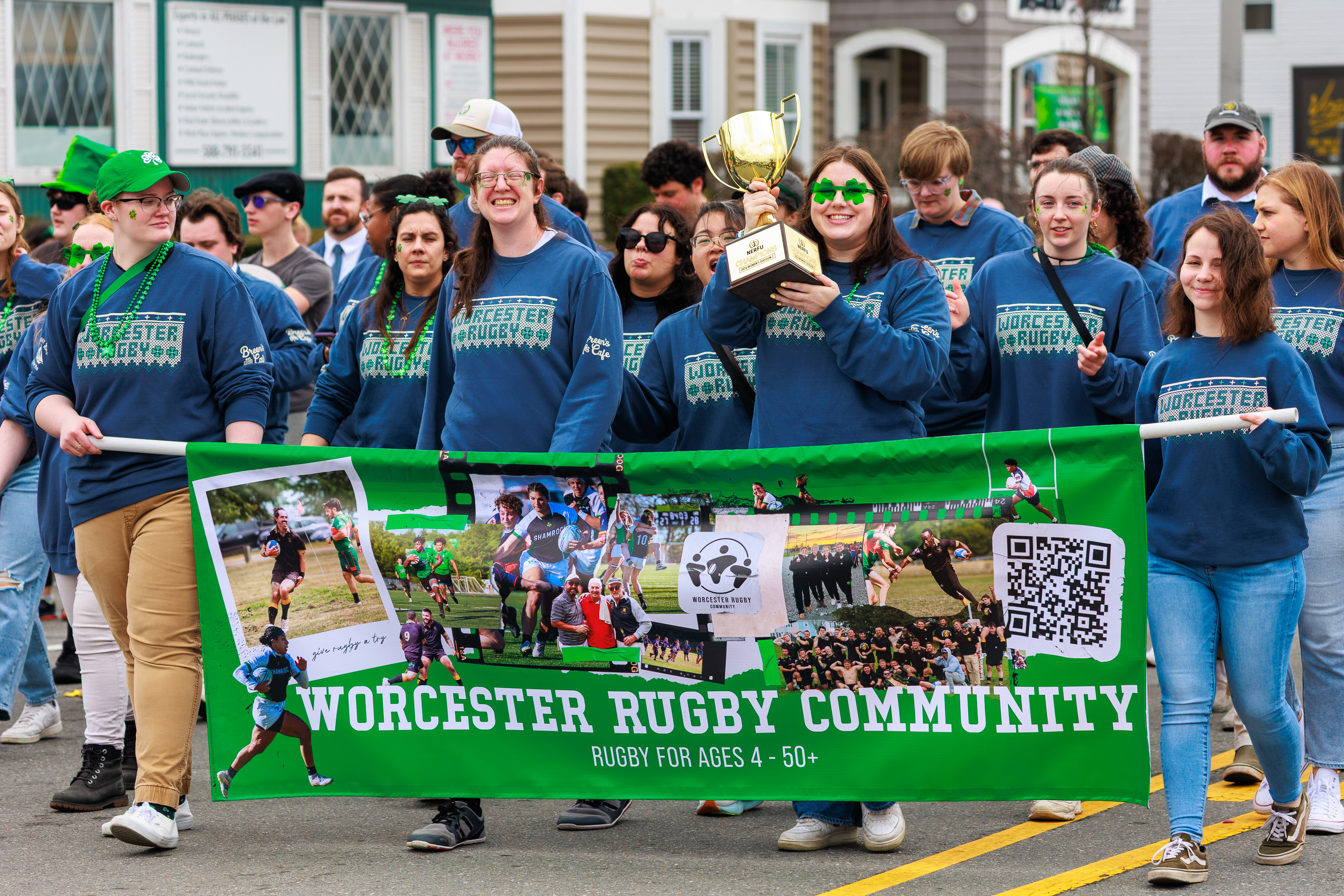
The Worcester Shamrocks show off their 2024 championship trophy in the Saint Patrick's Day Parade

The Worcester Rugby Football Club (WRFC), a recognized member of the USA Rugby (USAR), currently competes in the New England Rugby Football Union (NERFU) Division 2 league. The club was founded in 1979 by Rob Anderson, Peter Coz, and Mike Minty; joined NERFU in 1980, and was invited to join USARFU Division I league after a very successful 1999 fall season. WRFC is one of the top men's rugby clubs in the U.S., having reached the 2006 Men's Division 1 Club Final Four, before losing to eventual national champion Santa Monica in a close 20-13 match. The women's team (the Shamrocks) have reached the playoffs "a handful of times" and won the NERFU Women's Championship in 2024.

==== American Football ====
Indoor football returned to the city in April 2007. The New England Surge, a member of the Continental Indoor Football League, played their home games in the DCU Center. The team was disbanded after playing only a few seasons. The team replaced an Arena Football League team called the Massachusetts Marauders which played briefly in 1994.

=== Hockey ===
The Worcester Sharks played at the DCU Center from 2006 to 2015 in the American Hockey League as a developmental team for the National Hockey League's San Jose Sharks. The Sharks were relocated to San Jose, California to play in the same arena as the San Jose Sharks as part of a major realignment in the AHL prior to the 2015–16 season. The Sharks replaced the Worcester IceCats after the franchise moved to Peoria, Illinois, in 2005. The Worcester Railers began play in the 2017–18 season in the ECHL. In 2018, the former Boston Blades of the Canadian Women's Hockey League moved to Worcester as the Worcester Blades playing out of the Fidelity Bank Worcester Ice Center. However, the entire CWHL folded in 2019.

=== Golf ===
Golf's Ryder Cup's first official tournament was played at the Worcester Country Club in 1927. The course also hosted the U.S. Open in 1925, and the U.S. Women's Open in 1960 and is the only golf course to host the trio. The captains of the inaugural Ryder Cup where two of golfs greatest legends, Ted Ray of Great Britain and Walter Hagen of the United States. The United States won, 9 1/2 to 2 1/2.

Two years before the Ryder Cup the city hosted the U.S. Open won by Willie Macfarlane, but best known for the U.S. Open that Bobby Jones lost. Macfarlane and Jones where tied after the final round and an 18-hole playoff, the USGA officials decided to send the players out for another 18-hole playoff Macfarlane won 147–148. The last major golf tournament in the city was the 1960 U.S. Women's Open, won by Betsy Rawls, which made her the first golfer to win the U.S. Women's Open Title four times. A former PGA Tour event was held from 1969 through 1998 just south of Worcester. It was held under various names at Pleasant Valley Country Club in Sutton, Massachusetts.

=== Other ===
Lake Quinsigamond is home to the Eastern Sprints, a premier rowing event in the United States. Competitive rowing teams first came to Lake Quinsigamond in 1857. Quinsigamond Boating Club was the first of many boating clubs on Lake Quinsigamond who are drawn to the lake's long narrow shape, ideal for racing. Soon many colleges (local, national, and international) held regattas, such as the Eastern Sprints, on the lake. Beginning in 1895, local high schools held crew races on the lake. In 1932, the lake played host to the National Olympic rowing trials.

Marshall Walter ("Major") Taylor (November 26, 1878 – June 21, 1932) was an American cyclist who won the world one-mile (1.6 km) track cycling championship in 1899, 1900, and 1901. Taylor was the second black world champion in any sport, after boxer George Dixon. The Centrum (now DCU Center) was home to the Virginia Slims of New England women's tennis tournament for a few years in the late 1980s. Martina Navratilova, Chris Evert, and Steffi Graf were some of the outstanding players who participated in the tournaments. Various boxing title bouts have been fought in Worcester. The NCAA National Division I hockey and Division I basketball early rounds have been contested here. Charlie's Surplus Road Race fielded many world-class runners before ending in the early 1990s. Candlepin bowling was invented in Worcester in 1880 by Justin White, an area bowling alley owner.

== Collegiate sports ==
Worcester's colleges have had long histories and many notable achievements in collegiate sports:

- The Holy Cross Crusaders, led by future basketball hall-of-famers Bob Cousy and Tom Heinsohn, were NCAA men's basketball champions in 1947 and NIT men's basketball champions in 1954.
- The Holy Cross Crusaders football team played in the 1946 Orange Bowl, losing 13–6 to Miami (FL).
- Holy Cross won the 1952 NCAA College World Series, beating the University of Missouri 8–4. To date, the 1952 Crusaders remain the only college team from the Northeast to win the College World Series.
- In one of the biggest upsets in NCAA hockey history, the Holy Cross men's hockey team made history by defeating the Golden Gophers of the University of Minnesota in the first round of the 2006 NCAA Division I Tournament by the score of 4–3 in overtime.

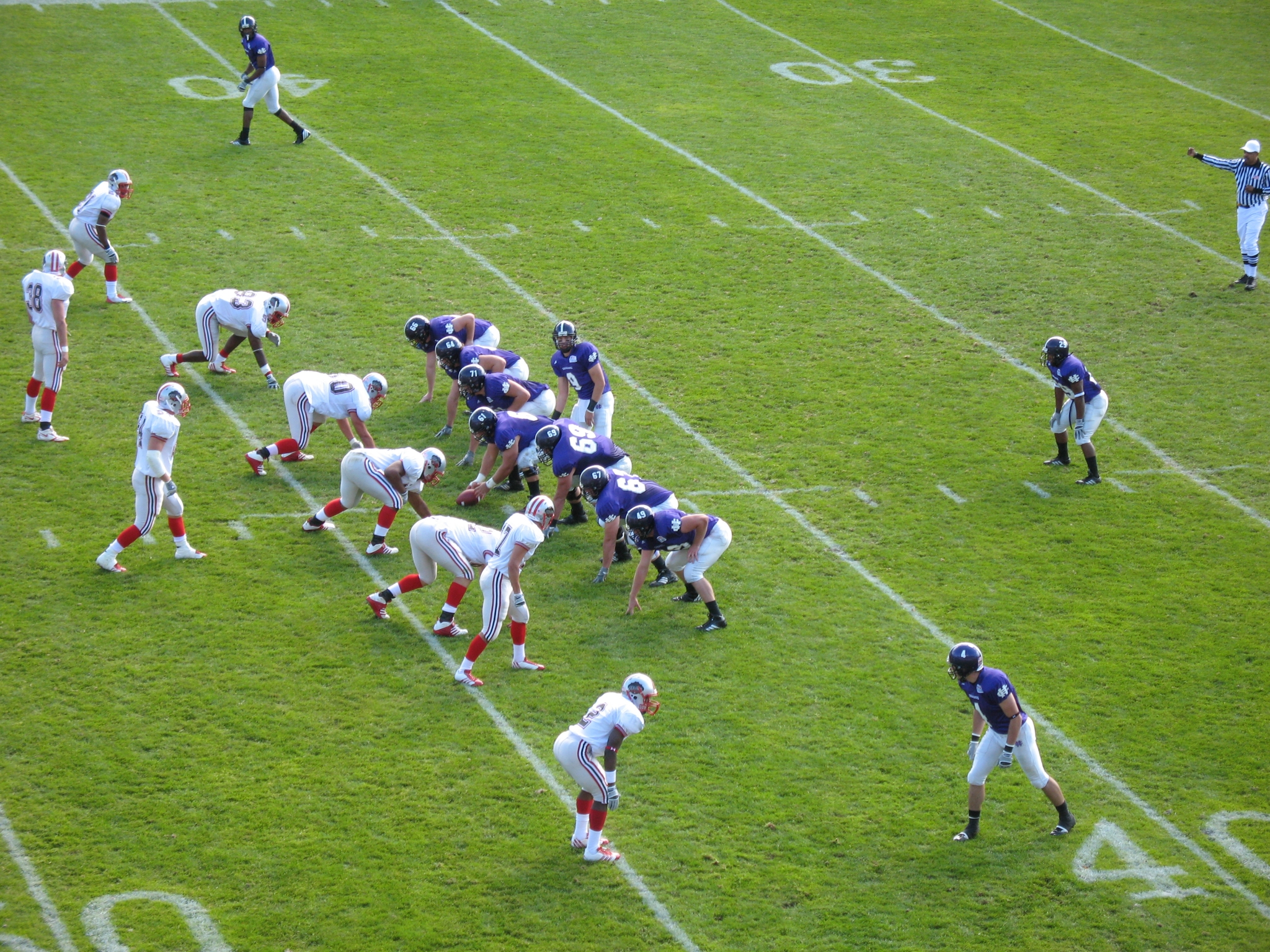
A Holy Cross football game at Fitton Field

- Holy Cross's Gordie Lockbaum is widely acknowledged as the last major college football program player to regularly play both offense and defense. Lockbaum finished third in the 1987 Heisman Trophy balloting, after finishing fifth in 1986. Lockbaum's son, Gordon Lockbaum Jr., was a star player on the 2002 Worcester Little League World Series team (See above).
- The Assumption College Greyhounds lay claim to being the only college baseball team to ever have two future baseball hall-of-famers (Jesse Burkett and Rube Marquard) on its staff at the same time (1931–32).
- Worcester Polytechnic Institute's "WPI Engineers" football has had three undefeated, untied seasons (1938, 1954 and 1983) and two Freedom Football Conference (FFC) Championships (1992 and 1993).
- The 1965-66 WPI Engineers basketball team was defeated by Army 71–62 on December 8, 1965. The win marked the first career coaching victory for a young coach named Bobby Knight.
- WPI football has the distinction of being Worcester's first college football team, debuting in 1888 with back-to-back losses to Harvard of 70–0 and 68–0
- The Clark University Cougars earned 10 consecutive NCAA Division III tournament berths, including two finishes as national runner-up in 1984 and 1987.
- Clark's women's basketball team earned back-to-back NCAA Division III Final Four appearances and were NCAA Northeast Champions in 1982 and 1983.
- The Worcester State College Women's Soccer team advanced to the 3rd round of the NCAA Tournament in 2007, which was the most successful NCAA appearance of any team in Worcester State history. They beat the #5 ranked William Smith College by a score of 2–0 in the first round. After not receiving a national ranking all year, Worcester State ended the season at #21.
