= Vesper Country Club =

Country club in Tyngsborough, Massachusetts

Coordinates: 42.654°N 71.396°W

- Location in the United States Location in Massachusetts.

Club information
- Location: 185 Pawtucket Blvd. Tyngsborough, Massachusetts, U.S.
- Established: 1899; 127 years ago
- Type: Private
- Total holes: 18
- Tournaments: Massachusetts Open: 1905, 1929, 1971, 1990, 2005, 2019; Massachusetts Amateur: 1951, 1963, 1979; New England Amateur: 1975
- Website: www.vespercc.com
- Par: 72
- Length: 6,726 yards (6,150 m)

Vesper Country Club is a private club in Tyngsborough, Massachusetts. The club derives from two late 19th century institutions, Vesper Boat Club and Lowell Country Club, which merged in 1894. The following year, members started creating a golf course originally consisting of six "links." In the late 1910s, the course commissioned Donald Ross to create a full 18-hole course. Though the course met with praise the ensuing decades were hard for Vesper. In the 1920s the clubhouse burnt down and in the 1930s a flood nearly destroyed the course. Since then, however, the club's history has been largely stable and the course has hosted several notable events, including the Massachusetts Open and Massachusetts Amateur several times.

== History ==
According to The Boston Globe, the club is an "amalgamation" of two late 19th century institutions, Vesper Boat Club and Lowell Country Club. In 1875, Vesper Boat Club was founded. Led by members of the boat club, Lowell Country Club was founded in 1892. The following year, members purchased Tyngs Island, a 95 acre island within the Merrimack River. Tyngs Island was a historic recreational facility, formerly a popular spot for picnics and most recently hosting an amusement park, and this influenced the purchase of the island. Bicycling was "the most popular sport of the day" and a bicycle track was quickly laid down shortly after the purchase of the island. In 1894, the boat club and country club merged.

On July 20, 1895, according to The Boston Globe, "new athletic grounds" were opened. The event would be commemorated by bicycle races and a baseball game. Tennis and croquet were also popular sports at the club. During the year, the members also decided to build a six hole golf course. Due to the popularity of the sport, three more "links" were added by end of the year. The course measured 2,950 yards. It was the first golf course in the Merrimack Valley. During the era, a new clubhouse was also built.

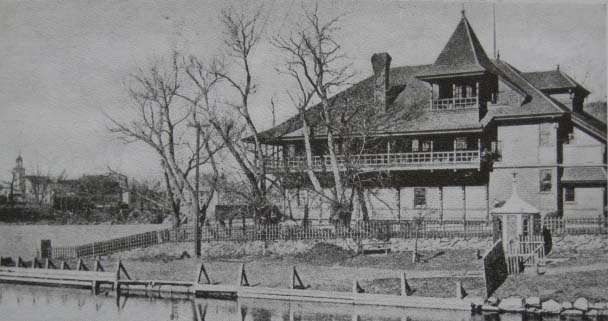
Vesper Boat House 1905

In 1899, Vesper Country Club was formally "incorporated." During the year, according to The Boston Globe, the club also "expended" thousands of dollars to improve the golf course, in particular with draining. Vesper began hosting a number of significant tournaments and formed relationships with a number of notable golf associations in the region around this time. In October 1900, it was reported by the Boston Evening Transcript that the legendary British golfer Harry Vardon would play exhibition matches at Vesper. In 1901, the club joined the Women's Golf Association. As of 1903, Vesper was hosting tournaments for the Massachusetts Golf Association (MGA). During the era, the MGA decided to hold the inaugural Massachusetts Open at Vesper. At the 1905 event, during the third round, Scottish-born professional Donald Ross shot a 77, the "best score of the morning," to tie A.G. Lockwood for the lead. Ross would go on to win the Massachusetts Open at 320 strokes.

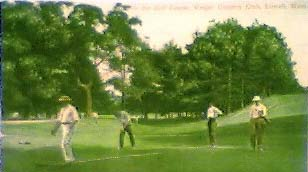
Golfers on the Course at Vesper Country Club- 1910

In the late 1910s, "plans were formulated to have a full 18 holes." Members decided to have Ross, now a golf course architect, to complete the course. He redesigned the existing nine holes and created an additional nine more holes to create a complete 18-hole golf course. The new holes were integrated into the middle of the course as holes #4-12. Vesper now measured 6,350 yards. The new course opened on June 23, 1921. The course grounds was broken into with an exhibition match between a team led by recent U.S. Open champion Francis Ouimet and a team led by recent U.S. Amateur champion Jesse Guilford. Ouimet's team won the match, 1 up.

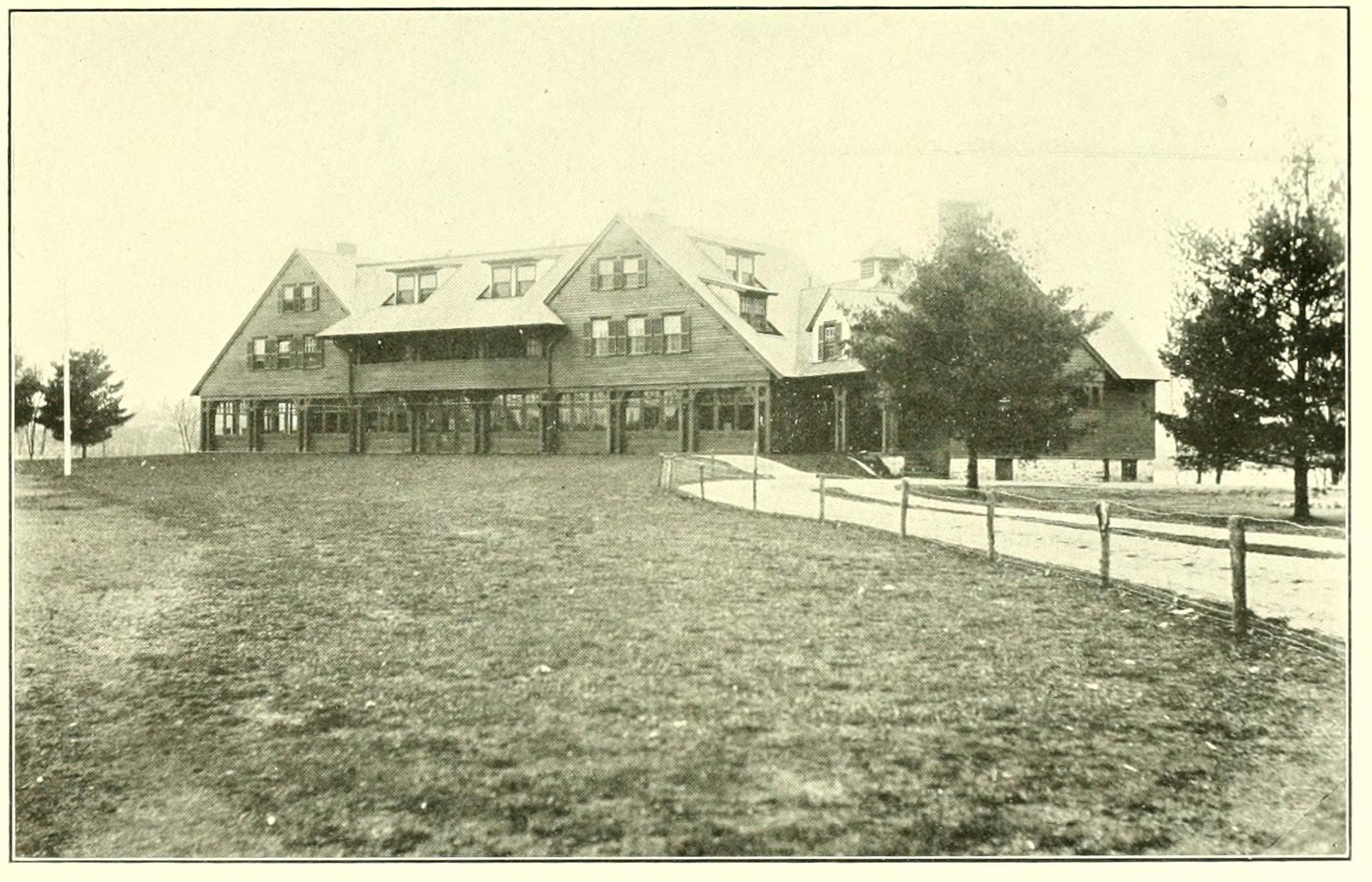
c. 1920 photograph of the Vesper Country Club

The ensuing years, however, were difficult times for Vesper. In the spring of 1923, the clubhouse burnt down. Vesper commissioned the architecture firm J. William Beal's Sons to build a new one. It would be the club's third. The new clubhouse would cost $90,000. It was intended to be complete on April 1, 1924. Roughly a decade later, in the spring of 1936, there was the northeastern United States flood crisis. The flood hit the golf course − situated on an island − quite hard. The bridge connecting Vesper to mainland was destroyed and the fairways were "ruined." It cost $40,000 to restore the course.

Vesper's history has been largely stable since then. In the mid-20th century the course's groundskeeper was Manuel Francis. During his time at the club he notably invented the Vesper Velvet Grass, a particularly resilient strand of grass that was amenable to golf courses. The course met with praise. During the era, future PGA Tour pro Bruce Douglass stated, "It's the finest conditioned course I've ever played on and I've played on quite a few." During the era, the club hosted a number of notable tournaments. In the mid-20th century, Vesper held the Massachusetts Amateur twice. In 1975, the course hosted the New England Amateur. In the late 20th century, Vesper has hosted some notable professional tournaments. In 1977, the course hosted the New England PGA Championship. It was won by Vesper's club pro Tom McGuirk. In 1990, Vesper hosted the Massachusetts Open once more. During the tournament, former PGA Tour pro Jeff Lewis shot a 65 breaking the course record.

Around the turn of the century, Vesper began improving the quality of the course. In the early 21st century, members voted to redesign the course, electing to restore the bunkers to Ross' original design and ensuring that the greens corresponded to modern USGA rules. By 2009, the project was complete. Since then the course has consistently received high rankings from the golf media. In 2011, Vesper was voted one of the top 100 "Classic Courses" in the United States by Golfweek. In 2013-14, Golf Digest voted it the 13th best golf course in the state. It has regularly been voted in the top 25 since then.

== Scorecard ==
Vesper Country Club
Tee	Rating/Slope	1	2	3	4	5	6	7	8	9	Out	10	11	12	13	14	15	16	17	18	In	Total
Par		4	4	4	3	5	4	5	4	3	36	4	5	4	4	3	4	4	3	5	36	72
SI	(Men)	11	3	9	17	7	13	5	1	15		12	6	2	14	18	4	8	16	10
Black	M: 73.6/137	296	418	392	147	480	339	554	392	216	3,234	374	534	412	373	198	440	424	211	526	3,492	6,726
Blue	M: 71.6/123	281	411	384	125	476	329	544	377	200	3,127	360	509	406	361	177	429	414	190	502	3,348	6,475
White	M: 71.9/128 W:76.1/133	281	385	384	125	476	329	475	377	165	2,997	360	509	367	361	177	383	321	153	502	3,133	6,130
Green	M: 68.1/123 W:73.8/128	269	307	304	113	440	318	475	323	165	2,714	303	444	367	293	163	383	321	153	440	2,867	5,581
Red	M: 71.6/123	269	307	304	113	395	247	475	263	114	2,487	303	444	367	293	163	318	321	153	440	2,802	5,289
SI	(Women)	13	7	11	17	5	3	1	9	15		12	8	2	10	16	6	14	18	4
