= Massachusetts Open =

Golf tournament

Tournament information
- Established: 1905
- Tour: former PGA Tour event (1916−1937)
- Format: Stroke play
- Month played: June

Current champion
- Evan Harmeling

The Massachusetts Open is the Massachusetts state open golf tournament. The brothers Donald Ross and Alex Ross had much success early in the tournament's history, winning the first eight events between them. In the mid-1910s, the Massachusetts Golf Association opened the event to golfers outside the state. The tournament evolved into an event of national significance as legendary golfers like Walter Hagen, Gene Sarazen, and Byron Nelson won during the era. In the 1940s, the event evolved into more of a local affair though many of the top pros from Massachusetts played. In the late 20th and early 21st century, PGA Tour pros from the state like Paul Harney, Dana Quigley, and Geoffrey Sisk won the event several times each.

== History ==
The early years of the tournament were dominated by the brothers Donald Ross and Alex Ross. Donald Ross won the first tournament, held at Vesper Country Club, defeating amateur Arthur G. Lockwood by a shot. His brother Alex won the next three events. In 1909, however, Donald Ross opened with the lead after the first three rounds. He possessed a four stroke lead over his brother entering the final round. However, Donald had several high scores early and lost the lead to Alex by the 4th hole. Alex had a two-stroke lead entering the 72nd hole but there were "visions of a tie and play-off when [he] got into trouble at the home hole." However, he managed to score a 5 to defeat his brother by one. The following year, at Essex Country Club, Alex Ross scored 305 to win for the 5th straight year, "a unique happening in the history of golf," according to The Boston Globe. The paper referred to it as "the best golf" ever played at the event. In 1911, the championship was held at The Country Club in Brookline, Massachusetts. In preparation for the event, the Boston Evening Transcript deemed Alex Ross the favorite again. However, it was his brother, Donald, who won the event. It was considered an even more "remarkable victory" as Ross had not played golf at all during the year, busy with his duties as a golf course designer. "Just taking a little vacation to play a few rounds of golf and to meet the boys," he said after the event. Donald Ross elected not to defend his championship the following year though. At the 1912 event, held at Oakley Country Club in Watertown, Massachusetts, Alex was the wire-to-wire leader and was victorious for the sixth time.

In mid-1910s, the tournament began to evolve into an event of national significance. In 1915, the Massachusetts Golf Association decided to open the tournament to players from other states. Star players from outside Massachusetts like Jim Barnes and Walter Hagen decided to play. Hagen won the tournament. Hagen intended to defend his championship. Other top golfers that intended to play in the 1916 event were Alex Smith, Pat Doyle, and Macdonald Smith. However, it was Boston-born Mike Brady who won, defeating Doyle in an 18-hole playoff. Brady had much success in the 1910s and 1920s. In 1923, he won again, for the third time.

In the late 1920s and early 1930s, the prestige of the tournament advanced. The Boston Globe noted that the 1927 tournament had "an entry list of National scope" including Walter Hagen, Johnny Farrell, and Joe Turnesa. Farrell led wire-to-wire and would go on to defeat Hagen by five. In 1928, Leo Diegel, who would win the U.S. Open a month later, recorded a "runaway" win at Wollaston Country Club, defeating the nearest competitors by 15 strokes. The following year, at Vesper Country Club, "a large field" of 96 players was at hand. Recent U.S. Amateur champion Jesse Guilford opened with a course record 70 to take lead. He led for the remainder of the tournament and defeated Mike Brady and Charles MacAndrew by two. The 1931 Massachusetts Open, held at Worcester Country Club, included a sizable field of 85 players. Wiffy Cox defeated Willie Macfarlane down the stretch. The following year's event was held at Oyster Harbor Club in Osterville, Massachusetts. The tournament consisted of 96 players. According to The Journal, the tournament "never... contained so many nationally prominent competitors" including former champions Guilford, Farrell, and Cox. In addition, the field included star amateur Francis Ouimet who was playing in the tournament for the first time in 16 years. Ouimet won the event. The 1935 event was held at Oak Hill Country Club in Fitchburg, Massachusetts. Legend Gene Sarazen shot a second round 66, breaking the course record, to take a seven shot lead. He would go on to win by 14 strokes.

In the late 1930s, transplanted professional Harold "Jug" McSpaden had much success at the event. McSpaden was the new club pro at Winchester Country Club in Winchester, Massachusetts, newly arrived from Kansas. At the 1936 event, in his "first major Eastern start," McSpaden closed with rounds of 71 and 75 to win by one. McSpaden played in the following year's event, once again held at Oyster Harbors in Cape Cod. According to The Associated Press, he was the favorite. He opened with "brilliant" rounds of 72 and 69 to take the joint lead. McSpaden would go on to win with an even-par total, defeating home pro Gene Anderson by three strokes. The following year's final round was a "repetition" of the duel between McSpaden and Andersen from the previous year. Once again, McSpaden defeated Andersen by three strokes. He also became the first "triple winner" of the event in thirty years since Alex Ross. The following two years, McSpaden was the "favorite." Byron Nelson and Horton Smith, respectively, defeated him though. However, in 1941, again at Oyster Harbor, McSpaden closed with a 67 (−5) to defeat Paul Runyan by three. His 280 total broke the aggregate tournament record. It was his fourth and final win at the event.

In the mid-20th century, the tournament evolved into a more local event. In the 1960s and 1970s, Paul Harney, a PGA Tour pro from Massachusetts, had much success winning the event five times. Around the turn of the century, another PGA Tour pro from Massachusetts, Geoffrey Sisk, also had repeated success, becoming the first six-time winner since Alex Ross during the inaugural years of the event.

== Winners ==
Year	Champion	Score	To par	Margin of victory	Runner(s)-up	Low Amateur	Venue	Ref.
2026	Evan Harmeling	205	−11	1 stroke	Ryan Celano	Alan Rose	Oyster Harbors Club	
2025	Steven DiLisio	211	−5	1 stroke	Xavier Marcoux	Jake Ratti	Sacconnesset Golf Club	
2024	Brandon Berry	204	−6	1 stroke	James Imai (a)	James Imai	Willowbend	
2023	David Pastore	204	−12	2 strokes	Jason Thresher	Ricky Stimets	TPC Boston	
2022	Michael Kartrude	200	−10	1 stroke	Peter Knade, Matthew Naumec (a)	Matthew Naumec	Longmeadow Country Club	
2021	Rob Labritz	205	−5	1 stroke	Jason Thresher, David Pastore, Shawn Warren, Max Theodorakis, Ben Spitz (a)	Ben Spitz	Oak Hill Country Club	
2020: No tournament due to COVID-19 pandemic								
2019	Mike Martel						Vesper Country Club	
2018	Jason Thresher (3)						GreatHorse	
2017	Jason Thresher (2)						Sacconnesset Golf Club	
2016	Jason Thresher						Worcester Country Club	
2015	Joe Harney						Black Rock Country Club	
2014	Ian Thimble						Weston Golf Club	
2013	Evan Harmeling	211	−5	Playoff	Chris Fitzpatrick		Woodland Golf Club	
2012	Michael Welch						Walpole Country Club	
2011	Kyle Gallo			1 stroke	Michael Ballo; Ty Capps		Oak Hill Country Club	
2010	Jimmy Hazen						Wellesley Country Club	
2009	Rob Oppenheim						Belmont Country Club	
2008	Jim Renner						Stockbridge Golf Club	
2007	Geoffrey Sisk (6)	200	−10	4 strokes	Frank Dully II		Kernwood Country Club	
2006	Geoffrey Sisk (5)	207	−3	3 strokes	Michael Harris		Charles River Country Club	
2005	Eric Egloff						Vesper Country Club	
2004	Geoffrey Sisk (4)	206	−7	2 strokes	Eli Zachheim		Pleasant Valley Country Club	
2003	Brian Quinn						Tedesco Country Club	
2002	Geoffrey Sisk (3)	202	−8	4 strokes	Rich Parker		Longmeadow Country Club	
2001	Rich Parker						Mount Pleasant Country Club	
2000	James Gilleon^{1}						Country Club of Pittsfield	
1999	Kevin Quinn (a)^{1}						Wellesley Country Club	
1998	Rodney Butcher						Oak Hill Country Club	
1997	Geoffrey Sisk (2)	208	−8	1 stroke	John Elliott		Crumpin-Fox Club	
1996	Jeff Leonard	205	−9	7 strokes	Fran Quinn		Winchester Country Club	
1995	Geoffrey Sisk	212	−4	2 strokes	Brett Quigley		Wollaston Golf Club	
1994	Peter Morgan^{1}						Woodland Golf Club	
1993	Pat Bates						Tedesco Country Club	
1992	Andy Morse (2)						Taconic Golf Club	
1991	John Elliott						Salem Country Club	
1990	Fran Quinn	210	−6	1 stroke	Jeff Lewis		Vesper Country Club	
1989	Andy Morse						Oak Hill Country Club	
1988	Jeff Lewis						Spring Valley Country Club	
1987	Steve Jurgensen						Weston Golf Club	
1986	Kevin Johnson (a)						Country Club of New Seabury	
1985	Jim Hallet	207	−6	1 stroke	Bruce Douglass; Bob Menne		Wellesley Country Club	
1984	Dana Quigley (3)	217	+1	1 stroke	Fran Marello Bruce Douglass		Wollaston Golf Club	
1983	Dana Quigley^{1} (2)						Charles River Country Club	
1982	Dana Quigley						Longmeadow Country Club	
1981	Bob Menne						Nashawtuc Country Club	
1980	Paul Moran						Essex Country Club	
1979	Jay Dolan						Brae Burn Country Club	
1978	Curt Madson	210		7 strokes	Tom McManus		Spring Valley Country Club	
1977	Paul Harney^{1} (5)						Country Club of New Seabury	
1976	Paul Barkhouse^{1}	211	+1	Playoff	Bruce Douglass; Bob Menne		Worcester Country Club	
1975	Dick Hanscom (2)						Charles River Country Club	
1974	Dick Hanscom^{1}						Woodland Golf Club	
1973	Bob Crowley^{1} (4)						Kernwood Country Club	
1972	Charles Volpone (2)						Tedesco Country Club	
1971	Charles Volpone						Vesper Country Club	
1970	Paul Harney^{1} (4)						Salem Country Club	
1969	Paul Harney (3)						Spring Valley Country Club	
1968	Paul Harney (2)						The International Golf Club	
1967	Paul Harney						Country Club of New Seabury	
1966	Bob Crowley (3)						Weston Golf Club	
1965	Jim Browning						Winchester Country Club	
1964	Bill Ezinicki (2)						Pleasant Valley Country Club	
1963	Bill Flynn						Kernwood Country Club	
1962	Bob Crowley (2)						Belmont Country Club	
1961	Don Hoenig^{1}						Tedesco Country Club	
1960	Bill Ezinicki						Country Club of Pittsfield	
1959	George Kinsman^{1}						Hyannisport Club	
1958	Bob Toski						Hyannisport Club	
1957	Bob Crowley						Coonamesset Club^{2}	
1956	Ed Oliver						Coonamesset Club^{2}	
1955	John Thoren (2)						Coonamesset Club^{2}	
1954	Don Hoenig (a)						Wachusett Country Club	
1953	Jim Browning						Worcester Country Club	
1952	Everett Stuart^{1}						Charles River Country Club	
1951	Julius Boros						Salem Country Club	
1950	John Thoren^{1}						South Shore Country Club	
1949	Edward Burke						Wachusett Country Club	
1948	Jerry Gianferante						Oak Hill Country Club	
1947	Gene Kunes^{1}						Belmont Country Club	
1946	Ellsworth Vines						Longmeadow Country Club	
1943–1945 No tournament due to World War II
1942	Ben Loving^{1}	286	−2	Playoff	Les Kennedy		Oyster Harbors Club	
1941	Jug McSpaden (4)	280	−8	3 strokes	Paul Runyan		Oyster Harbors Club	
1940	Horton Smith	287	−1	4 strokes	Gene Anderson		Oyster Harbors Club	
1939	Byron Nelson	283	+3	5 strokes	Lloyd Mangrum		Worcester Country Club	
1938	Jug McSpaden (3)	293	+5	3 strokes	Gene Anderson		Oyster Harbors Club	
1937	Jug McSpaden (2)	288	E	3 strokes	Gene Anderson		Oyster Harbors Club	
1936	Jug McSpaden	292	+8	1 stroke	Wilfred Crossley (a)		Oak Hill Country Club	
1935	Gene Sarazen	285	+1	14 strokes	Guy Paulsen		Oak Hill Country Club	
1934	Roy Bronsdon	287	−1	2 strokes	Bobby Crowley		Oyster Harbors Club	
1933	Ted Turner	290		Playoff	Frank Dickey		Belmont Spring Country Club	
1932	Francis Ouimet (a)	287	−1	1 stroke	Herman Barron		Oyster Harbors Club	
1931	Wiffy Cox	292	+12	8 strokes	Willie Macfarlane		Worcester Country Club	
1930	Joe Turnesa	305		1 stroke	Fred Wright, Jr. (a)		Brae Burn Country Club	
1929	Jesse P. Guilford (a) (2)	295		2 strokes	Charles MacAndrew; Mike Brady		Vesper Country Club	
1928	Leo Diegel	294		15 strokes	Henry Ciuci; George Aulbach		Wollaston Country Club	
1927	Johnny Farrell	285		5 strokes	Walter Hagen		Sandy Burr Country Club	
1926	Donald Vinton	297		2 strokes	Tom Lally; Mike Brady; Willie Ogg; Fred Wright Jr. (a)		Worcester Country Club	
1925	Tom Lally	306		1 stroke	Jesse P. Guilford (a); Jack Stait		Charles River Country Club	
1924	Willie Ogg	295		Playoff	Jack Stait		Kernwood Country Club	
1923	Mike Brady (3)	300		8 strokes	Bert Nichols		Tedesco Country Club	
1922	George Kerrigan	283		3 strokes			Country Club of Springfield	
1921	Louis Tellier	309		Playoff	John Cowan		Essex Country Club	
1920	George L. Bowden	289		8 strokes	Tom McNamara		Commonwealth Country Club	
1919	Jesse P. Guilford (a)			3 strokes	Mike Brady; John Cowan; George Fotheringham		Worcester Country Club	
1917–1918 No tournament due to World War I
1916	Mike Brady (2)			Playoff	Pat Doyle		Brae Burn Country Club	
1915	Walter Hagen	298		5 strokes	Mike Brady		The Country Club	
1914	Mike Brady	309		Playoff	Orrin Terry		Belmont Spring Country Club	
1913	Tom McNamara	313		Playoff	Mike Brady		Brae Burn Country Club	
1912	Alex Ross (6)	295		6 strokes	Tom McNamara		Oakley Country Club	
1911	Donald Ross (2)	311		2 strokes	Mike Brady		The Country Club	
1910	Alex Ross (5)	305		3 strokes	J.G. Anderson (a)		Essex Country Club	
1909	Alex Ross (4)	290		1 stroke	Donald Ross		Woodland Country Club	
1908	Alex Ross (3)	290		5 strokes	Alex Campbell		The Country Club	
1907	Alex Ross (2)	302		Playoff	Gilbert Nicholls; David Brown		Brae Burn Country Club	
1906	Alex Ross	297		1 stroke	Alex Campbell		Wollaston Country Club	
1905	Donald Ross	320		1 stroke	Arthur G. Lockwood (a)		Vesper Country Club	

^{1} Denotes playoff win
^{2} Now called Cape Cod Country Club
