= George Wright Golf Course =

Golf course in Boston, Massachusetts

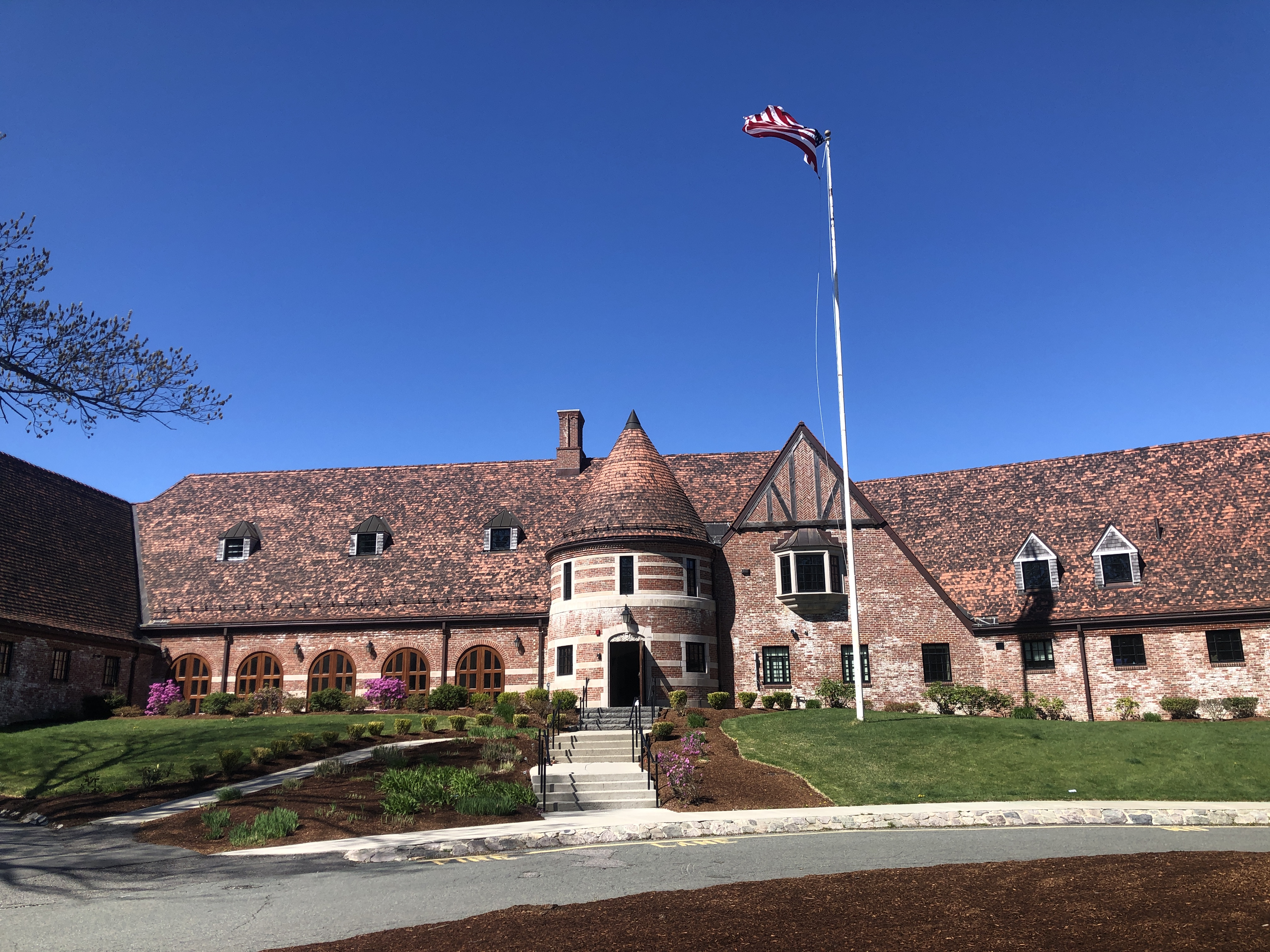
- George Wright Golf Course Clubhouse in 2021
- Interactive map of George Wright Golf Course
- 42°16′05″N 71°07′58″W

Club information
- Location: Boston, Massachusetts, United States
- Established: 1938, 88 years ago
- Type: Public
- Owner: City of Boston
- Operator: City of Boston Parks and Recreation Department
- Total holes: 18
- Tournaments: MGA 2018 Massachusetts Amateur
- Website: cityofbostongolf.com
- Designed by: Donald Ross
- Par: 70
- Length: 6,506 yards (5,949 m)
- Course rating: 71.9
- Slope rating: 133
- Course record: 63 (2008)

George Wright Golf Course is a municipal golf course in the Hyde Park and Roslindale neighborhoods of Boston, Massachusetts. The course was designed by Donald Ross, with the construction completed as one of President Franklin Delano Roosevelt's Works Progress Administration (WPA) projects. It represents one of the least known but impressive examples of Ross' breathtaking design art. The course opened in 1938.

== History ==
The course is named for George Wright, a Hall of Fame baseball player with the Boston Red Stockings, along with being one of the leaders of introducing golf to the Boston area in 1890.

Retired businessman Henry Sturgis Grew purchased several hundred acres of land (which later became known as "Grew's Woods") in 1847, in what was then the western section of the town of Dorchester Massachusetts. Grew became a founding father of the Town of Hyde Park, incorporated on April 22, 1868, composed of portions of Dorchester (including Grew's Woods), Dedham and Milton. Grew died in 1892. In 1925 his son Edward Wigglesworth Grew, as trustee of his father's estate, sold 13,700,000 square feet (1,270,000 m^{2}) of the property through his company Meredith & Grew (now Colliers International) to the Bonelli-Adams Company. The intent was to set aside 136-acre (55 ha) of this land in order to construct a privately financed golf course, to be designed by Wayne Stiles.

Instead Donald Ross, the golf course architect who lived in nearby Newton, was commissioned to design the course. Eyeing the terrain, Ross was reported to have shaken his head and said: "You would need one of two things to build a suitable course on this property. Either a million dollars or an earthquake." When the market crashed in 1929 the project was abandoned.

On Nov. 6, 1930, the Board of Street Commissioners took the land by eminent domain for recreational purposes, specifically a municipal golf course. The Grew estate was a mix of ledge and swamp, not particularly suitable for building a course, and a good deal of speculation remained whether one could be built. However, despite concerns, construction began in January 1931.

In 1932 Walter Irving Johnson, who had worked for years as an associate of Ross, took on the project as an engineer for the Metropolitan District Commission. During the seven years in which the course and clubhouse were under construction, the work passed from the municipal administration of Mayor James Michael Curley to the federal Civil Works Administration (CWA) and Works Progress Administration (WPA) programs. George Wright became one of the great feats of engineering and building in the annals of golf. Before completion, 60,000 pounds (27,000 kg) of dynamite were used to excavate the ledge, 72,000 cubic yards (55,000 m^{3}) of dirt were spread to raise the ground above the swamp level, and 57,000 feet (17,000 m) of drainage pipe were laid to drain the property. The WPA provided the funds to build the course, estimated at $1,000,000 by completion in 1938. At one time 1,000 men worked on the project.

By completion, George Wright sported a full-sized 18-hole golf course, as well as a nearly 3 miles (4.8 km) long 3-to-6-foot-high (0.91 to 1.83 m) stone wall that encircled the entire 156-acre (0.63 km^{2}) site. In addition, a Norman-style clubhouse of mammoth proportion was constructed at a cost of $200,000. The course opened to much fanfare on April 23, 1938, with Mayor Maurice J. Tobin driving the opening ball while a WPA band played "Annie Laurie", an old Scottish song. The yearly fee for membership was $35, and the daily greens fee was $2.

In 1946, Mayor Curley, in his fourth and final term, proposed converting the course into a veterans' housing project.

=== Decline ===
By the 1970s and early 80s, conditions deteriorated due to city budget cuts. Faced with a tax-cutting ballot initiative (Proposition 2½) and possible closure in 1982, the city leased the property to the Massachusetts Golf Association for $1 a year for a period of 8 years. Starting in 1990, the city started receiving 3.5 percent of gross revenues. In 1994, the city's share of profits increased by 1 percentage point to 4.5 percent.

=== Resurrection ===
After decades of contracted management, the City of Boston decided to take over operational control of the facility in 2004. The decision was made to provide the best golf experience possible for the city's residents at an affordable rate. Mark Mungeam was contracted by the City of Boston to renovate the course. Since taking over operations, George Wright has gradually returned to prominence as evidenced by being selected as a MGA Amateur Qualifying Site in 2009.

- Named Golf.com's 3rd Best Municipal Golf Course in America 2021
- Selected in 2012, 2013, 2014 & 2015 as one of Golfweek's "Best Courses You Can Play" list.
- Voted 2009 Best Municipal Golf Course in Massachusetts by Golf Digest.
- Named 14th Best Municipal in the United States in 2009 by Golfweek.

== Features ==
Over half the holes on the course include hills that often cause the golfer to hit blind shots. Somewhat narrow fairways guarded by large numbers of mature trees also make this relatively short course extremely challenging.

The hill on the 12th hole approaching the green (the "Double-decker," with the steep face also known as "Suicide Hill") has been used for years by locals in the winter as a place for sledding and tobogganing. Despite a death in the mid-1990s in the small pond adjacent to the hill, the City of Boston still permits the practice.

The course is open seven days a week from April 1 through November 30, located at 420 West Street in the Hyde Park section of Boston, at approximately where West Street turns into Poplar Street.

== Scorecard ==
George Wright Golf Scorecard
Tee	Rating/Slope	1	2	3	4	5	6	7	8	9	Out	10	11	12	13	14	15	16	17	18	In	Total
Blue	71.9 / 133	394	364	527	159	426	384	433	167	449	3303	462	350	412	386	189	507	346	167	384	3203	6506
White	69.9 / 129	379	329	504	149	413	367	422	155	438	3156	442	345	402	369	174	500	325	160	364	3081	6237
Gold	66.2 / 120	290	308	471	130	348	302	403	149	317	2718	320	336	370	338	142	493	307	150	345	2801	5522
Red	68.8 / 112	287	272	350	121	348	302	359	142	309	2490	314	241	361	282	132	374	272	150	292	3418	4908
Par		4	4	5	3	4	4	4	3	4	35	4	4	4	4	3	5	4	3	4	35	70
SI		11	13	5	17	3	7	9	15	1		2	10	6	8	16	4	14	18	12
