= Massachusetts Amateur =

Golf championship in Massachusetts, United States

The Massachusetts State Amateur Championship, better known as the Massachusetts Amateur, is a golf championship held in Massachusetts for the state's top amateur golfers. The tournament is run by Mass Golf in mid-July each year. The amateur championship is the biggest and most subscribed event on the Mass Golf calendar.

Tournament entries are open to any amateur golfer who holds membership in a Mass Golf Member Club and has an up-to-date Mass Golf/USGA GHIN Handicap Index not exceeding 3.6.

== History ==
In 1903, the inaugural Massachusetts Amateur was held at the Myopia Hunt Club in Hamilton, Massachusetts. It was won by Arther Lockwood. Thirty-eight contestants entered from the 42 MGA member clubs. The most famous winner of the championship is six-time champion Francis Ouimet. Other notable winners include Jesse Guilford, Dick Chapman and Eddie Lowery. Fred Wright holds the record with seven titles.

Since 1992, six Massachusetts Amateur champions have turned professional: Trevor Gliwski, Flynt Lincoln, James Driscoll, Jim Salinetti, Rob Oppenheim, and Michael Thorbjornsen who plays full-time on the PGA Tour in 2025. The 2008 tournament marked the 100th playing of the Massachusetts Amateur. Today the tournament holds a field of 144 players from 400 golf facilities across the state. The championship starts with two days of stroke play. The low 32 scores continue on to match play competition.

In 2021, Michael Thorbjornsen defeated Matt Parziale, 8 and 6, at Brae Burn Country Club in a rare final between past USGA champions. Thorbjornsen, the 2018 U.S. Junior Amateur champion, made 18 birdies over 30 holes against Parziale, the 2017 U.S. Mid-Amateur champion.

In 2023, Molly Smith became the first woman to qualify for the tournament. Ryan Downes became the event's youngest winner at age 17. He won the title again in 2025 at his home club.

== Winners ==
Year	Winner	Score	Runner-up	Venue	Ref.
2026	Aidan Emmerich	8 & 6	Zac Georgantas	Winchester Country Club	
2025	Ryan Downes (2)	7 & 6	Patrick Kilcoyne	GreatHorse	
2024	Matthew Naumec	1 up	Ricky Stimets	Framingham Country Club	
2023	Ryan Downes	6 & 5	Matthew Naumec	Essex County Club	
2022	Conner Willett	4 & 2	Ryan Downes	Concord Country Club	
2021	Michael Thorbjornsen	8 & 6	Matt Parziale	Brae Burn Country Club	
2020	Matthew Organisak	2 up	Nick Maccario	The Kittansett Club	
2019	Steven DiLisio	3 & 2	Jimmy Hervol	The Country Club	
2018	Patrick Frodigh	4 & 3	Herbie Aikens	George Wright Golf Course	
2017	Matt Parziale	4 & 3	Matt Cowgill	Charles River Country Club	
2016	Brendan Hunter	4 & 3	John Kelly	Taconic Golf Club	
2015	Nick McLaughlin	4 & 3	Patrick Frodigh	Oak Hill Country Club	
2014	John Kelly	3 & 2	Doug Clapp	Kernwood Country Club	
2013	Mike Calef (2)	8 & 7	Ian Thimble	Longmeadow Country Club	
2012	Mike Calef	3 & 1	Mark Souliotis	Tedesco Country Club	
2011	Ryan Riley	4 & 3	Frank Vana Jr.	Wyantenuck Country Club	
2010	John Hadges	2 & 1	Dan Head	Myopia Hunt Club	
2009	Bill Drohen	4 & 3	Frank Vana Jr.	The Country Club	
2008	John Hadges	1 up	Matt Parziale	The Kittansett Club	
2007	Burgess Houston	1 up	Frank Vana, Jr.	Concord Country Club	
2006	Ben Spitz	5 & 4	Burgess Houston	Worcester Country Club	
2005	Frank Vana, Jr. (2)	6 & 5	Ben Spitz	Essex County Club	
2004	Frank Vana, Jr.	5 & 4	Mike Cole	Taconic Golf Club	
2003	Andy Drohen	1 up	Frank Vana Jr.	The Country Club	
2002	Rob Oppenheim	1 up	Brian Higgins	Winchester Country Club	
2001	Brendan Hester	3 & 2	Jim Renner	The Orchards Golf Club	
2000	Jim Salinetti (3)	2 up	Larry Nuger	Worcester Country Club	
1999	Jim Salinetti (2)	9 & 8	Ed Fletcher	The Kittansett Club	
1998	James Driscoll (2)	1 up	Joe Keller	Belmont Country Club	
1997	Jim Salinetti	5 & 3	Bob Bradley	Weston Golf Club	
1996	James Driscoll	7 & 5	Joe Keller	Myopia Hunt Club	
1995	Ed Fletcher	1 up	John Curley	Concord Country Club	
1994	Douglas Preston	1 up	Jim Ruschioni	Charles River Country Club	
1993	Flynt Lincoln	40 holes	Jason Kissell	Essex County Club	
1992	Trevor Gliwski	2 & 1	Flynt Lincoln	Longmeadow Country Club	
1991	John Salamone	11 & 9	George Popp	Brae Burn Country Club	
1990	Ray Wright	6 & 5	Jon Fasick	The Kittansett Club	
1989	Jim McDermott (3)	5 & 4	Ray Richard	Worcester Country Club	
1988	Kevin Johnson (2)	6 & 5	Joe Keller	Thorny Lea Golf Club	
1987	Kevin Johnson	6 & 5	Fran Quinn, Jr.	The Country Club	
1986	Fran Quinn	3 & 2	Bill Martin	Winchester Country Club	
1985	Steve Tasho (2)	7 & 6	Jim Ruschioni	Myopia Hunt Club	
1984	Jim McDermott (2)	2 & 1	Geoffrey Sisk	Country Club of Pittsfield	
1983	Jim Hallet (2)	3 & 2	Jim Bombard	Woodland Golf Club	
1982	Jim Hallet	6 & 5	Paul Murphy	Tedesco Golf Club	
1981	Steven Tasho	7 & 6	Fran Quinn	Taconic Golf Club	
1980	Jim McDermott	5 & 3	Kevin Klier	Salem Country Club	
1979	Ed Polchlopek	7 & 6	Joe Henley	Vesper Country Club	
1978	Dave Brilliant	1 up	Randy Stevenson	The Kittansett Club	
1977	Gary Burnett	8 & 6	Peter Teravainen	Weston Country Club	
1976	Bruce Douglass (2)	37 holes	Peter Teravainen	The Country Club	
1975	Bruce Douglass	2 & 1	Bobby Caprera	Winchester Country Club	
1974	Bill Mallon (2)	4 and 3	Fran Quinn, Sr.	Pleasant Valley Country Club	
1973	Bill Mallon	3 and 2	Ron Micheals	Belmont Country Club	
1972	Gary Burnett	1 up	Joe Browning	Longmeadow Country Club	
1971	Tracy Mehr	7 & 5	Alan O'Neil	Taconic Golf Club	
1970	John Tosca, Jr.	1 up	Tom Cavicchi	Essex County Club	
1969	Peter Drooker	1 up	Allen Doyle	Brae Burn Country Club	
1968	Mike Ohanian	2 up	Alan O'Neil	Nashawtuc Country Club	
1967	Barrie Bruce	6 & 5	Bob Kirouac	The Country Club	
1966	Warren Tibbetts	5 & 4	Ted Crangelo	Charles River Country Club	
1965	Ted Carangelo	1 up	Andy Gard	Woodland Golf Club	
1964	William Foley	7 & 5	Matty Ciociolo	Worcester Country Club	
1963	Bruce Dobie	2 & 1	Robert Kirouac	Vesper Country Club	
1962	Joe Carr	11 & 9	Jim OBey	Salem Country Club	
1961	Ted Bishop (3)	11 & 10	Dave Sullivan	Oak Hill Country Club	
1960	Pat Granese	6 & 5	Gerry Anderson	Tedesco Golf Club	
1959	John Tosca, Jr.	2 up	Jay Dolan	Taconic Golf Club	
1958	William G. Harding	2 & 1	Dave Sullivan	The Kittansett Club	
1957	David Sullivan	3 & 2	Dick Kinchla	Longmeadow Country Club	
1956	Charles Volpone	6 & 5	Fred Wright	Belmont Country Club	
1955	Ed Connell	2 & 1	Billy Horne	Myopia Hunt Club	
1954	Rupert Daniels	2 up	Dave Sullivan	Country Club of Pittsfield	
1953	Ernie Doherty	7 & 6	Andy Gard	Salem Country Club	
1952	Tom Mahan, Jr.	5 & 4	Leo Grace	Winchester Country Club	
1951	Eddie Martin (2)	39 holes	Ernie Doherty	Vesper Country Club	
1950	Dick Chapman	37 holes	Eddie Martin	Brae Burn Country Club	
1949	Bobby Knowles	3 & 2	Dick Chapman	The Country Club	
1948	Eddie Martin	1 up	Clarence Earley	Worcester Country Club	
1947	John Chew	2 & 1	George Curley	Commonwealth Golf Course	
1946	Ted Bishop (2)	7 & 6	Eddie Martin	Charles River Country Club	
1942–45: Cancelled due to World War II
1941	Leo J. Martin	4 & 3	Milton Reach, Jr.	Longmeadow Country Club	
1940	Ted Bishop	5 & 3	Leo J. Martin	Salem Country Club	
1939	Ted Adams	6 & 5	Ray Marad	Tedesco Golf Club	
1938	Fred Wright, Jr. (7)	4 & 2	Emory Stratton	Essex County Club	
1937	Dave Whiteside	1 up	Fred Wright	Winchester Country Club	
1936	Clark Hodder	1 up	Leo J. Martin	Charles River Country Club	
1935	Edward Stimpson	20 holes	Mel Merritt	Brae Burn Country Club	
1934	Bill Blaney	4 & 3	John Nies	The Country Club	
1933	Joseph P. Lynch	5 & 4	Eddie Lowery	Worcester Country Club	
1932	Edward P. Kirouac	2 & 1	Bill Blaney	Kernwood Country Club	
1931	Fred Wright, Jr. (6)	3 & 2	Eddie Lowery	Winchester Country Club	
1930	Fred Wright, Jr. (5)	7 & 5	Bill Blaney	Salem Country Club	
1929	Fred Wright, Jr. (4)	8 & 6	Emery Stratton	Belmont Spring Country Club	
1928	Fred Wright, Jr. (3)	5 & 4	Joe Norton, Jr.	Essex County Club	
1927	Eddie Lowery	4 & 3	Billy Whitcomb	Charles River Country Club	
1926	Fred Wright, Jr. (2)	3 & 2	Frank C. Newton	Brae Burn Country Club	
1925	Francis Ouimet (6)	4 & 3	Winthrop Hersey	The Country Club	
1924	Jesse Guilford (3)	9 & 8	Ray Gorton	Woodland Golf Club	
1923	Karl E. Mosser	3 & 1	R.W. Brown	Brae Burn Country Club	
1922	Francis Ouimet (5)	12 & 11	Clark Hodder	Kernwood Country Club	
1921	Jesse Guilford (2)	10 & 8	A. Perley Chase	Worcester Country Club	
1920	Fred Wright, Jr.	2 & 1	Parker Schofield	The Country Club	
1919	Francis Ouimet (4)	8 & 6	Jesse Guilford	Winchester Country Club	
1917–18: Cancelled due to World War I
1916	Jesse Guilford	10 & 9	S. Trafford Hicks	Wollaston Golf Club	
1915	Francis Ouimet (3)	6 & 5	Bill Chick	Woodland Golf Club	
1914	Francis Ouimet (2)	5 & 4	Ray Gorton	Brae Burn Country Club	
1913	Francis Ouimet	10 & 9	Frank Hoyt	Wollaston Golf Club	
1912	Heinrich Schmidt	1 up	Francis Ouimet	Brae Burn Country Club	
1911	John G. Anderson (2)	3 & 2	George V. Rotan	Essex County Club	
1910	H.W. Stucklen	5 & 3	Percival Gilbert	Brae Burn Country Club	
1909	Percival Gilbert	6 & 4	Joseph Thorp	Oakley Country Club	
1908	Thomas R. Fuller	3 & 2	H.H. Wilder	Wollaston Golf Club	
1907	John G. Anderson	6 & 4	Frank Hoyt	Woodland Golf Club	
1906	Arthur G. Lockwood (3)	7 & 6	L.J. Gilmer	Brae Burn Country Club	
1905	Arthur G. Lockwood (2)	4 & 3	Hugo R. Johnstone	The Country Club	
1904	Andrew Carnegie II	8 & 7	T.G. Stevenson	Essex County Club	
1903	Arthur G. Lockwood	7 & 5	Hugo R. Johnstone	Myopia Hunt Club	
