= Hyannis Port Historic District =

Historic district in Massachusetts, United States

- U.S. National Register of Historic Places
- U.S. Historic district
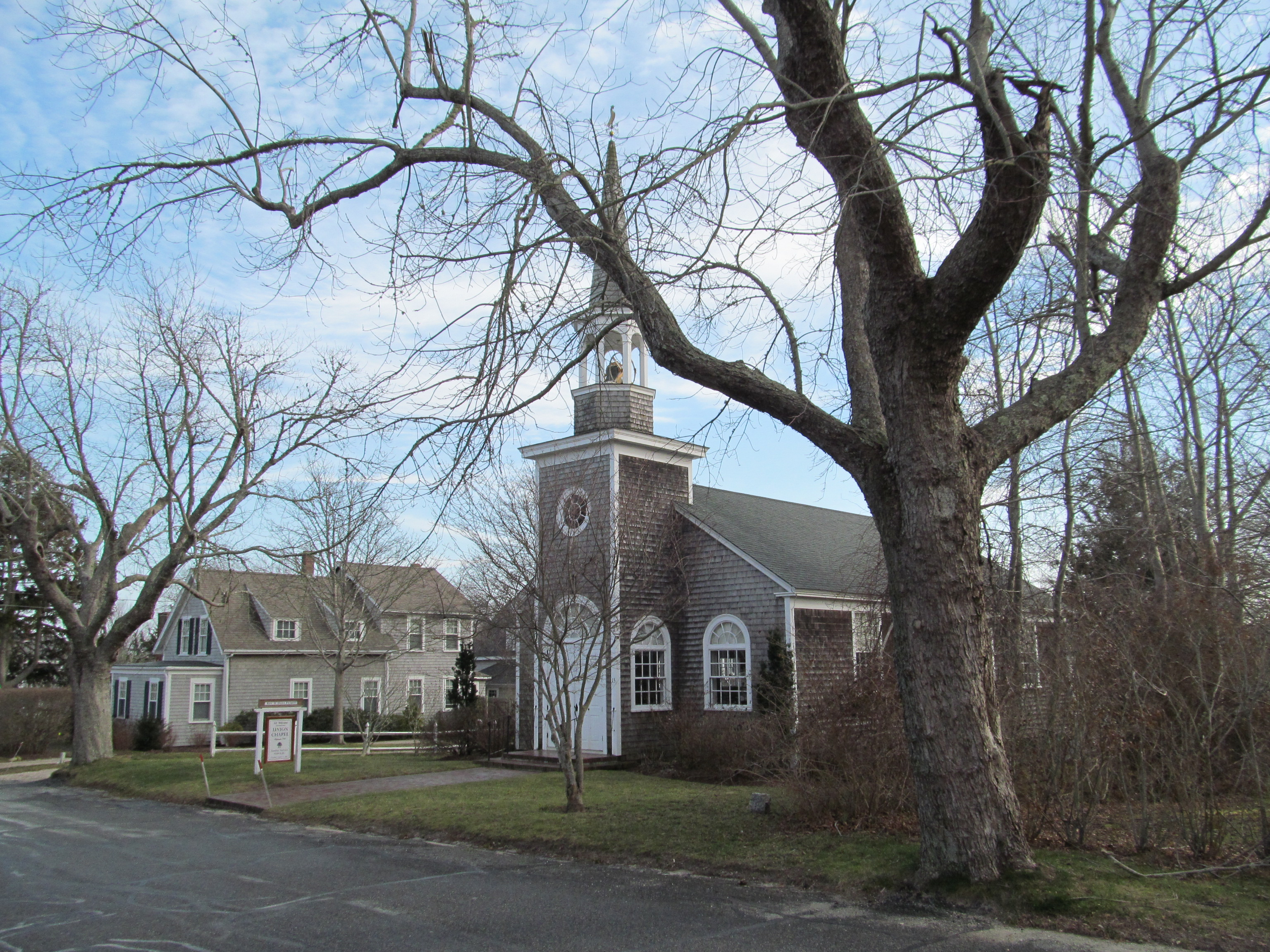
- Union Chapel

- Location within Cape Cod Location within Massachusetts Location within the United States
- Location: Barnstable, Massachusetts
- Coordinates: 41°37′58.59″N 70°18′6.91″W
- Area: 100 acres (40 ha)
- Architectural style: Late 19th And 20th Century Revivals, Bungalow/Craftsman, Late Victorian
- MPS: Barnstable MRA
- NRHP reference No.: 87000259
- Added to NRHP: November 10, 1987

The Hyannis Port Historic District encompasses the historic heart of Hyannis Port, Massachusetts, an area that was intensively developed as a summer resort community beginning in the later decades of the 19th century. The district is about 100 acres (40 ha) in size, and extends from nearly Scudder Avenue in the west to Ocean Avenue in the east. It is bounded on the south by Nantucket Sound, and on the north by Grayton, Edge Hill, and Ocean Avenues. The district was added to the National Register of Historic Places in 1987.

Until the late 19th century, Hyannis Port was a modest agricultural and seafaring village. The Hyannis Land Company was formed in 1871-72 and engaged in a major resort development push, which was one of the largest such efforts on the Cape. The company purchase most of the oceanfront property between Dunbar's Point and Craigville, and platted out parcels. They built several hotels, staged events to promote the area, and built summer resort houses for vacationers from as far off as Indianapolis and Chicago. The company was not financially sound, however, and went bankrupt in 1879. The area was not fully developed until the first decades of the 20th century. The district does have a few 18th-century houses, but most of its houses are in the styles popular in the late 19th and early 20th centuries. The most famous residents of Hyannis Port, however, are the Kennedy family, whose compound is a National Historic Landmark. Joseph P. and Rose Kennedy purchased the compound's main house in 1926.

== See also ==
- National Register of Historic Places listings in Barnstable County, Massachusetts
