= Hyannisport Club =

Private golf club in Massachusetts

Coordinates: 41°38′8.40″N 70°18′40.32″W

- Location in the United States Location in Massachusetts

Club information
- Location: Hyannis Port, Massachusetts
- Established: 1897; 129 years ago
- Tota holes: 18
- Tournaments: Massachusetts Open; : 1958, 1959
- Website: www.hyannisportclub.com

The Hyannisport Club is a private club located in Hyannis Port, Massachusetts. The club's origins spring from a late 19th century summer resident and golf enthusiast named John Reid who created a handful of holes against Nantucket Sound. Over subsequent decades, the club purchased more land and eventually expanded into a full 18-hole course. In the 1930s, Hyannisport was re-designed by the famed golf course architect Donald Ross. The course is also strongly associated with the Kennedy family. It was a "deciding factor" for Joseph P. Kennedy Sr. to purchase a summer house in the village and was the home course of President John F. Kennedy. Hyannisport remains one of the most notable clubs in the state, having been voted one of the top courses in Massachusetts by The Boston Globe and Golf Digest.

== History ==
The genesis of the course starts with a summer resident named John Reid. Reid was a Scottish emigrant who had a passion for golf and was one of the founders of the United States Golf Association (USGA). In 1897, he created the original six holes. In 1901, the club gained access to a marsh and expanded the course into a 60-acre, nine hole course. During the year, the course hosted one of its first tournaments, the Hyannisport Cup. It became an annual event. In 1902, Alexander Findlay designed a revamped nine hole course on the property. During this era, Hyannisport joined the Massachusetts Golf Association and the USGA.

In 1913, the club purchased land from a dairy farmer, Charles Marchand, and expanded the course into an 18-hole course. In 1921, the club purchased more land from Marchand and increased length and added bunkers. In 1930, the course purchased an additional 40 acres to create a 140-acre property. This version of the course was re-designed by Ross. Ross made revisions to 14 of the 18 holes. Later in the decade, Lucius Frederick Paine, one of the original members of the club, made a number of revisions too. Since 1940, the terrain of the course has remained the largely the same.

The course is known for its naturalistic design and its "defense remains rooted in the Cape Cod elements," in particular "swirling wind and dense fog." Marjorie Hunter of The New York Times once wrote that the course has been favorably compared to St Andrews Golf Club in Scotland, having been referred to as the "St. Andrew's of the East."

The course is strongly associated with the Kennedy family. In 1923, Joseph P. Kennedy Sr. attempted to join Cohasset Golf Club. However, he was rejected due to his Irish Catholic heritage. Kennedy, who had connections with the members at Hyannisport, decided to join the club in spite of it being another "Yankee stronghold." It was a "deciding factor" for Kennedy to purchase a summer house in the village. The Kennedy Compound is located a third of a mile away from the course. John F. Kennedy played the course regularly when he was president. The administration, however, did not significantly publicize his golf outings, circumspect about how it would affect support among his working-class constituents.

In the mid-late 20th century the course hosted a number of significant tournaments. In 1952, the course began hosting the Seagulls Fourball Championship which is continuously operating. In the late 1950s, the Massachusetts Open was held at Hyannisport. In 1990, the course began hosting the Robert F. Kennedy Human Rights Golf Tournament.

In the 1990s, the course received high rankings from a number of top publications. In 1996, LINKS magazine awarded the course as one of "the finest environmentally sensitive golf courses across the country." In 1999, The Boston Globe noted that the course was the 6th best course in Massachusetts and the best in Cape Cod. Also during this era, Golf Digest noted that it was among the top ten courses in the state.

In the late 20th century, a greens superintendent at the club discovered some designs by Donald Ross that had been unused. Members thought about redesigning some of the holes in accordance with his ideas. Between 2007 and 2010, Ross's masterplans had been implemented.

== Scorecard ==
Hyannisport Club
Tee	Rating/Slope	1	2	3	4	5	6	7	8	9	Out	10	11	12	13	14	15	16	17	18	In	Total
Par		4	4	4	4	3	5	4	3	5	36	4	4	4	4	4	3	5	3	4	35	71
SI		3	17	7	1	15	11	9	13	5		4	2	6	16	8	12	10	18	14
Blue	M: 70.1/128	439	268	354	410	176	520	390	196	510	3,263	392	421	391	309	377	177	476	141	310	2,994	6,257
White	M: 69.1/125	435	260	345	400	154	516	374	187	460	3,131	380	413	379	305	372	170	471	131	301	2,835	6,053
