= Salem Country Club =

Private country club in Peabody, Massachusetts

Club information
- Location: Peabody, Massachusetts
- Established: 1895; 131 years ago
- Type: Private
- Tota holes: 18
- Tournaments: Massachusetts Amateur: 1930, 1940, 1953, 1962, 1980; U.S. Women's Amateur: 1932; Massachusetts Open: 1951, 1969, 1991; U.S. Women's Open: 1954, 1984; U.S. Senior Open: 2001, 2017; New England Amateur: 2003
- Website: www.salemcountryclub.org
- Designed by: Donald Ross (golfer)

Salem Country Club is a private country club in Peabody, Massachusetts. The club's early history was unstable. In the late 19th- and early 20th century, the club moved between four locations in Salem and Peabody. In 1925, the club made its final move to western Peabody converting a territory called Sanders Farm into an 18-hole golf course. The construction was a major undertaking, costing nearly half a million dollars and necessitating 3,000 laborers. The club has had a largely stable history since then, hosting several USGA championships as well as being consistently rated by Golf Digest as one of the top 100 courses in the United States.

== History ==
Salem Country Club was founded on November 4, 1895. The club origins are peripatetic. The original members were described "as adventurers into a more or less unknown sport" and were unsure of where to place to club. They ultimately settled on placing the club in North Salem on a piece of property called Gardner Farm. The property was recently owned by the writer Nathaniel Hawthorne. It was a nine-hole course and called Salem Golf Club. It cost $10.30 to construct. The following year the club "they moved clear across town" for their next venue, another nine hole course. The moves continued. In 1897, they returned to Gardner Farm, but to a different part of the farm. Membership expanded in ensuing years and in 1912 the club moved into Peabody, Massachusetts. It remained a nine-hole course. During this era, Salem became a member of the USGA.

In 1925, the club made their final move to the west side of Peabody. The organization purchased a territory called Sanders Farm and converted it into a golf course. Engineers needed ten tons of dynamite to clear out the "wooded areas." They were assisted by 300 Maine lumberjacks. Overall, it took 3,000 laborers to complete the construction of the course. The course cost nearly a half a million dollars to build. The famed golf course architect Donald Ross designed the course. The new club officially opened on October 12, 1926. In the 1930s, Salem began hosting a number of significant tournaments. In 1930, the course hosted the Massachusetts Amateur. In 1932, Salem hosted the U.S. Women's Amateur. During this era, Tony Manero, former U.S. Open champion, served as club pro.

The mid-20th century, however, was a time of financial hardship for the club. According to The Salem News, the club "suffered during the Great Depression of the 1930s and World War II." In 1936, Salem increased life membership $1,000 per person to raise revenue. Financial distress resumed, however, during World War II. The club sold steel lockers to the defense department to help stem the tide though. This was "the last rough spot the organization has known" financially.

In the 1950s, there were great improvements to the club. A caddy house, driving range, and practice greens were added. In 1956, an Olympic-style swimming pool was incorporated into the club. Lionel MacDuff, president of the Massachusetts Golf Association, also greatly influenced Salem. He was able to help the club secure a number of notable tournaments, the first of which was an exhibition match between Sam Snead and Ben Hogan in 1953. The following year the club hosted the U.S. Women's Open.

In the mid-20th century, the course received a number of accolades from Golf Digest. In 1969, the publication included Salem Country Club on its America's 100 Greatest Courses list. It remained on the list for the remainder of the century. In 1977, the publication stated that Salem was among the top five courses in Massachusetts. It also maintained this status for the remainder of the century.

Around the turn of the century, however, the quality of the course regressed. By 2005, the course fell off Golf Digest's Top 100 list. The following year, it was no longer listed as one of the top courses in Massachusetts for the first time in decades. Salem hired designer Eric Iverson to improve the course. The club spent $3,500,000 in an effort to rehabilitate the club and assure that the modern course corresponded to Ross's original design. According to The Salem News, "The greens were restored to their original dimensions the end of 2015." During this era, many trees were also removed to provide better sunlight to the surface of the course. Salem quickly returned to be noted as one of the top courses in the state by Golf Digest. In 2017, the course hosted the U.S. Senior Open.

The club's logo is a witch. The witch's name is Luba Nin. Club member Edie O'Connor served as the club's mascot when Salem hosted USGA championships in the 1980s and 1990s. Her costume received much media attention, including from Sports Illustrated.

== Scorecard ==
Salem Country Club
Tee	Rating/Slope	1	2	3	4	5	6	7	8	9	Out	10	11	12	13	14	15	16	17	18	In	Total
Par		4	4	3	4	5	3	4	5	4	36	4	5	3	4	3	5	4	4	4	36	72
SI	Men's	11	9	17	13	1	15	5	3	7		10	4	18	14	16	2	6	12	8
Gold	74.1 / 135	410	398	169	396	506	225	392	517	466	3,479	413	494	152	344	214	531	422	425	442	3,437	6,916
Blue	71.8 / 131	398	379	151	385	488	212	373	492	386	3,264	404	478	146	329	203	499	403	402	382	3,246	6,510
Black	69.7 / 131	362	369	137	358	470	177	355	477	373	3,078	362	452	135	301	175	488	390	384	377	3,064	6,142
White	68.6 / 125 (M)	357	359	124	351	444	177	331	457	351	2,951	357	429	129	297	141	478	380	374	352	2,937	5,888
Green	64.9 / 113 (M)	327	287	115	332	433	151	279	367	296	2,587	309	419	121	268	137	455	286	284	308	2,587	5,174
White	73.9 / 131 (W)	357	359	124	351	444	177	331	457	351	2,951	357	429	129	297	141	478	380	374	352	2,937	5,888
Silver	72.8 / 128 (W)	327	359	124	332	433	151	331	457	344	2,858	357	419	129	268	141	455	380	374	308	2,831	5,689
Green	70.2 / 125 (W)	327	287	115	332	433	151	279	367	296	2,587	309	419	121	268	137	455	286	284	308	2,587	5,174
