= Ted Bishop (golfer) =

American golfer (1913–1986)

Personal information
- Full name: Stanley Eugene Bishop
- Nickname: Ted
- Nationality: United States
- Born: January 10, 1913 Natick, Massachusetts, U.S.
- Died: September 25, 1986 (aged 73) Cambridge, Massachusetts, U.S.
- Height: 6 ft 3 in (1.91 m)

Career
- Sport: Golf
- Status: Amateur

Best results in major championships
- Masters Tournament: T55: 1952
- PGA Championship: DNP
- U.S. Open: T50: 1937
- The Open Championship: DNP

Stanley Eugene "Ted" Bishop (January 10, 1913 – September 25, 1986) was an American golfer who had a brief professional career before being reinstated as an amateur in the 1930s.

== Early life ==
Bishop was born in Natick, Massachusetts.

== Career ==
Bishop won several amateur tournaments, including three Massachusetts Amateurs and two New England Amateurs, with his biggest win being the 1946 U.S. Amateur. He defeated Smiley Quick on the 37th hole of the 36-hole final match at Baltusrol Golf Club in Springfield, New Jersey.

Bishop played on the winning Walker Cup teams in 1947 and 1949.

== Amateur wins ==
- 1940 Massachusetts Amateur
- 1941 New England Amateur
- 1946 Massachusetts Amateur, New England Amateur, U.S. Amateur
- 1961 Massachusetts Amateur

== U.S. national team appearances ==
Amateur

- Walker Cup: 1947 (winners), 1949 (winners)
