= Kennedy Compound =

Historic house in Massachusetts, United States

- U.S. National Register of Historic Places
- U.S. National Historic Landmark District
- U.S. Historic district – Contributing property
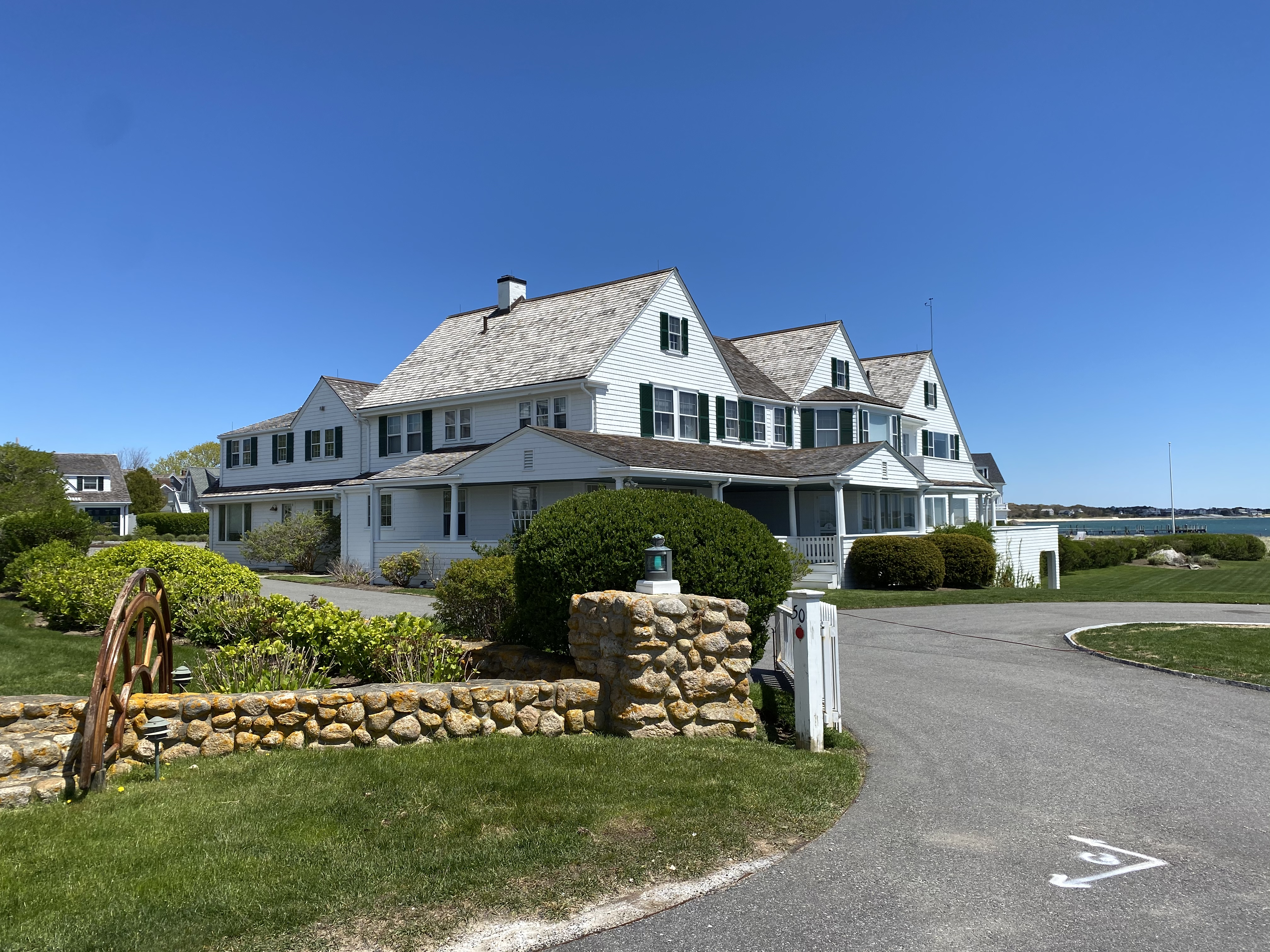
- The Kennedy Compound in Hyannis Port, Massachusetts in 2021

- Location within Cape Cod Location within Massachusetts
- Location: 50 Marchant Avenue; Hyannis Port, Massachusetts, U.S.
- Coordinates: 41°37′47.928″N 70°18′8.4954″W
- Area: 6 acres (2.4 ha)
- Built: 1904
- Architectural style: Clapboard
- Part of: Hyannis Port Historic District (ID87000259)
- NRHP reference No.: 72001302

Significant dates
- Added to NRHP: November 28, 1972
- Designated NHLD: November 28, 1972
- Designated CP: November 10, 1987

The Kennedy Compound consists of three houses on six acres (2.4 hectares) of waterfront property in Hyannis Port, Massachusetts on Cape Cod. It was once the home of Joseph P. Kennedy Sr., an American businessman, philanthropist, investor, and diplomat; his wife, Rose; and their nine children, including U.S. President and Senator John F. Kennedy and U.S. Senators Robert F. Kennedy and Edward M. Kennedy. As an adult, the youngest son, Edward, lived in his parents' house, and it was his primary residence from 1982 until he died of brain cancer at the compound, in August 2009.

Purchased in 1928, the compound became the place that the Kennedy family associated most with home.

John F. Kennedy used the compound as a base for his successful 1960 U.S. presidential campaign and later as a "Summer White House" and presidential retreat. In 2012, the main house was donated to the Edward M. Kennedy Institute for the United States Senate.

== History ==
In 1926, Joseph P. Kennedy Sr. rented a summer cottage at 50 Marchant Avenue in Hyannis Port. Two years later, he purchased the structure, which had been erected in 1904 as Malcolm Cottage for original owner Beulah Malcolm, and enlarged and remodeled it to suit his growing family's needs. In and around this house, their nine children spent their summers and early autumns, acquiring a lifelong interest in sailing and other competitive activities. The Kennedys previously spent their summers at a cottage on Nantasket Beach in Hull, Massachusetts (where Joseph Jr. was born in 1915). During the mid-1920s, the Kennedys explored purchasing a home in Cohasset, Massachusetts, but when Joe Sr. applied for membership at the exclusive Cohasset Country Club, he was denied. Historian Doris Kearns Goodwin wrote that in Cohasset, "Irish Catholics were still looked down upon by the reigning Protestant (WASP) establishment". Joseph Sr., who had connections with the members at the Hyannisport Golf Club, was accepted in spite of it being another "Yankee stronghold". It was a deciding factor for Joseph Sr. to purchase a house in the seaside village. In 1941, the Hyannis Port home became the family's primary (legal) residence.

In 1956, John bought a smaller home of his own at 111 Irving Avenue,^{(41.6308°N 70.3035°W)} not far from his father's home. In 1959, Edward acquired the residence at 28 Marchant Avenue ^{(41.63°N 70.303°W)} adjacent to the other two, but in 1961 sold it to Robert and his wife Ethel. Edward lived in the main house at the compound until his death.

== Layout ==
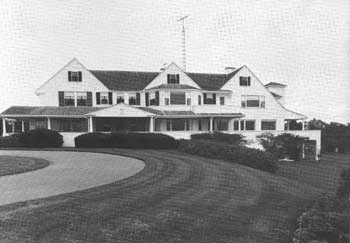
Kennedy Compound in 1972.

All three buildings are white, frame, clapboard structures typical of vacation residences on Cape Cod. Except for specific occasions at the Main House, the buildings are not available for public visitation.

=== Main house ===
Joseph Sr.'s home, the Main House and the largest of the three, is surrounded by well-tended lawns and gardens and it has sweeping views of Nantucket Sound from its long porches.

On the main floor are a living room, dining room, sun room, television room, kitchen, various pantries, utility rooms and the bedroom that John used before he purchased his own house in the compound.

On the second floor there are six bedrooms, a sewing room, packing room, and four servants' bedrooms. The house has a full attic.

The basement contains a motion-picture theater and a hall covered with dolls from all around the world. The dolls belonged to Joseph Sr. and were gifted to him from a number of different acquaintances during his time as the 44th US Ambassador to the United Kingdom.

The house has changed little, either structurally or in furnishings, since President Kennedy's association with it.

In 2012, the main house was donated by the Kennedy family to the Edward M. Kennedy Institute for the United States Senate. On the grounds are an enclosed swimming pool, tennis court, a four-car garage, and two guest houses.

There are two circular driveways with flagpoles standing in the middle, a boathouse and several large stretches of lawn area where many of the family's touch football games were played.

Other parcels of land that assorted members of the family have purchased remain as well-tended as those of the more prominent homes.

== See also ==
- List of National Historic Landmarks in Massachusetts
- List of residences of presidents of the United States
- National Register of Historic Places listings in Barnstable County, Massachusetts
