= Worcester Country Club =

American private country club and golf course

Coordinates: 42.320926°N 71.778682°W

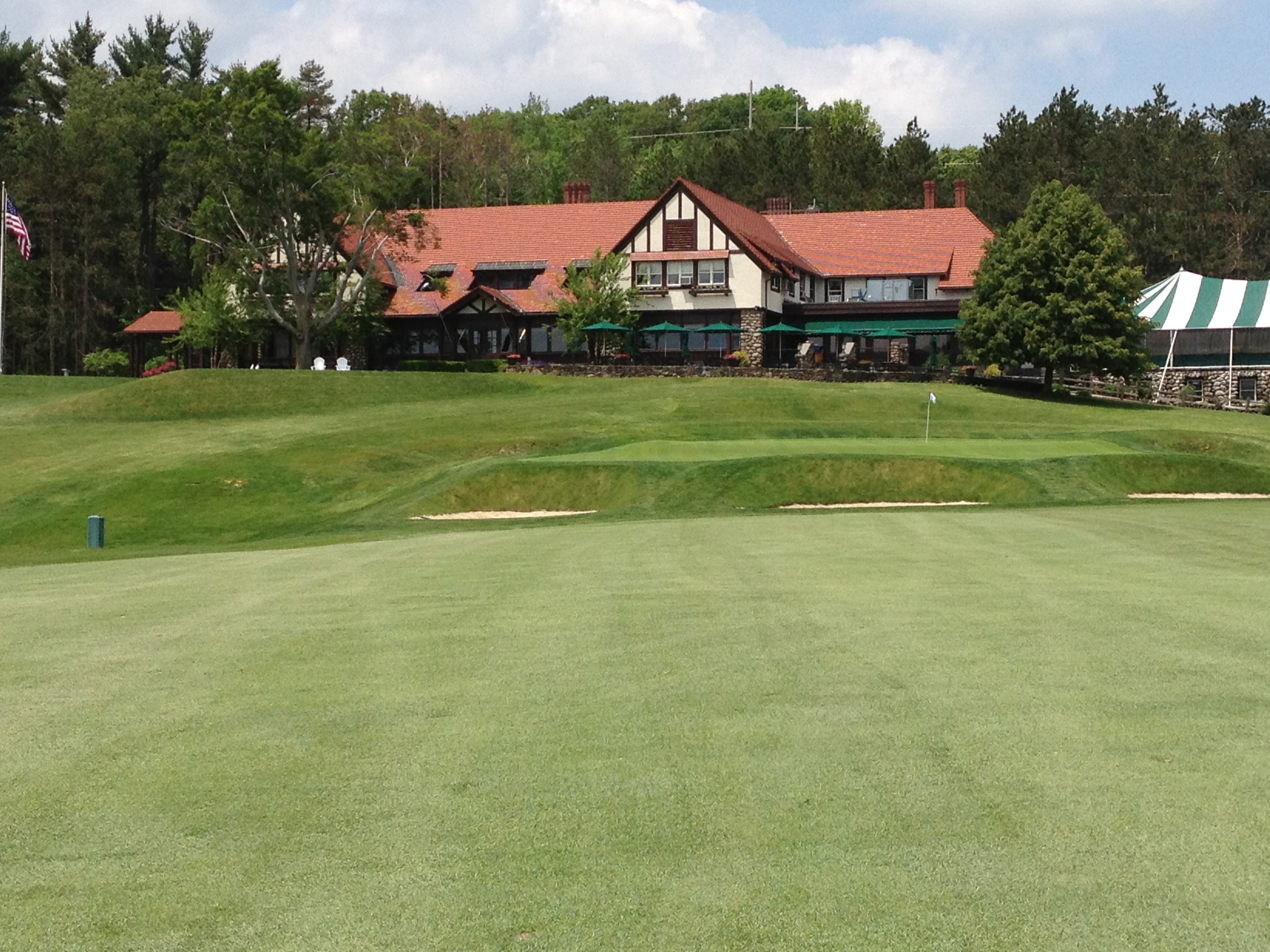
- Interactive map of Worcester Country Club

Club information
- Location: Worcester, Massachusetts
- Established: 1900
- Type: Private
- Tota holes: 18
- Tournaments: Massachusetts Open: 1919, 1926, 1931, 1939, 1953, 1976, 2016; Massachusetts Amateur: 1921, 1933, 1948, 1964, 1989, 2000, 2006; U.S. Open: 1925; New England Amateur: 1927, 1935; Ryder Cup: 1927; U.S. Women's Open: 1960
- Website: www.worcestercc.org
- Designed by: Donald Ross (1913)
- Par: 70
- Length: 6,750

Worcester Country Club is a private country club and golf course in Worcester, Massachusetts. The course hosted the first Ryder Cup in 1927, and was the site of the 1925 U.S. Open, which was won by Willie Macfarlane. Worcester also hosted the 1960 U.S. Women's Open. It was the first, and currently only one of three golf courses in the United States to host the men's and women's U.S. Open Championships and the Ryder Cup. For over half a century Worcester was the only club to have hosted all three events until 2014 when Pinehurst hosted its first U.S. Women's Open. Hazeltine made it an elite group of three upon its host of the 2016 Ryder Cup, but notably, Hazeltine is not a classic course (built in 1962). Worcester also hosted the first-ever U.S. Open qualifying round in 1924. The club is tied with Oyster Harbors for hosting the most Massachusetts Opens (7) and has also hosted 7 Massachusetts Amateur Championships. Worcester is one of a few private clubs in the United States that has a bowling alley in the men's locker room.

== History ==
In 1900, Worcester Country Club was founded. In 1913, the club called on golf architect Donald Ross to build an 18-hole golf course on a new site in Worcester. In 1914, President William Howard Taft hit the ceremonial first ball to open the new course.

In 1925, the club hosted U.S. Open. The event was won by Scottish golfer Willie Macfarlane in a second 18-hole playoff over Bobby Jones. This was the championship in which Jones famously called a penalty on himself when his ball moved slightly in the rough after he touched the grass with his club on the 11th hole of the first round. The penalty cost him the title. When praised by the press for his sportsmenship Jones said "You may as well praise me for not robbing a bank. There is only one way to play the game." In addition, Walter Hagen on the 6th hole had his first hole-in-one during a practice round of the 1925 U.S. Open.

In 1927 Worcester Country Club hosted the inaugural Ryder Cup. After his arrival in the U.S. from Carnoustie, Scotland, Willie Ogg – who served as one of the early head professionals at the club – was instrumental in arranging for the first Ryder Cup matches to be held at his home course in 1927. Ogg also laid out the Green Hill Golf Club in Worcester, and the course opened up for play on April 1, 1929. Ogg served as vice president of the PGA of America. The United States team led by captain Walter Hagen and Gene Sarazen defeated captain Ted Ray and the British team by a score of 9.5 to 2.5.

Donald Ross came back to the club in 1929 with plan for changes, including new tees and some work that he had been unable to carry out in 1913.

In 1960, Betsy Rawls won her fourth U.S. Women's Open with a score of 292. Hosting the Women's Open marked Worcester CC as the first club in the United States to entertain both Open Championships. Judy Torluemke (Judy Rankin), then 15 years old, was the youngest player in history to win low amateur honors, with 326. Mickey Wright, the leader going into the final day and seeking her third consecutive Open championship, shot eighty-one to lose to Betsy Rawls. The prize money was $7,200. Rawls won $1,800.
