= Municipal Golf Course =

- U.S. National Register of Historic Places
- U.S. Historic district
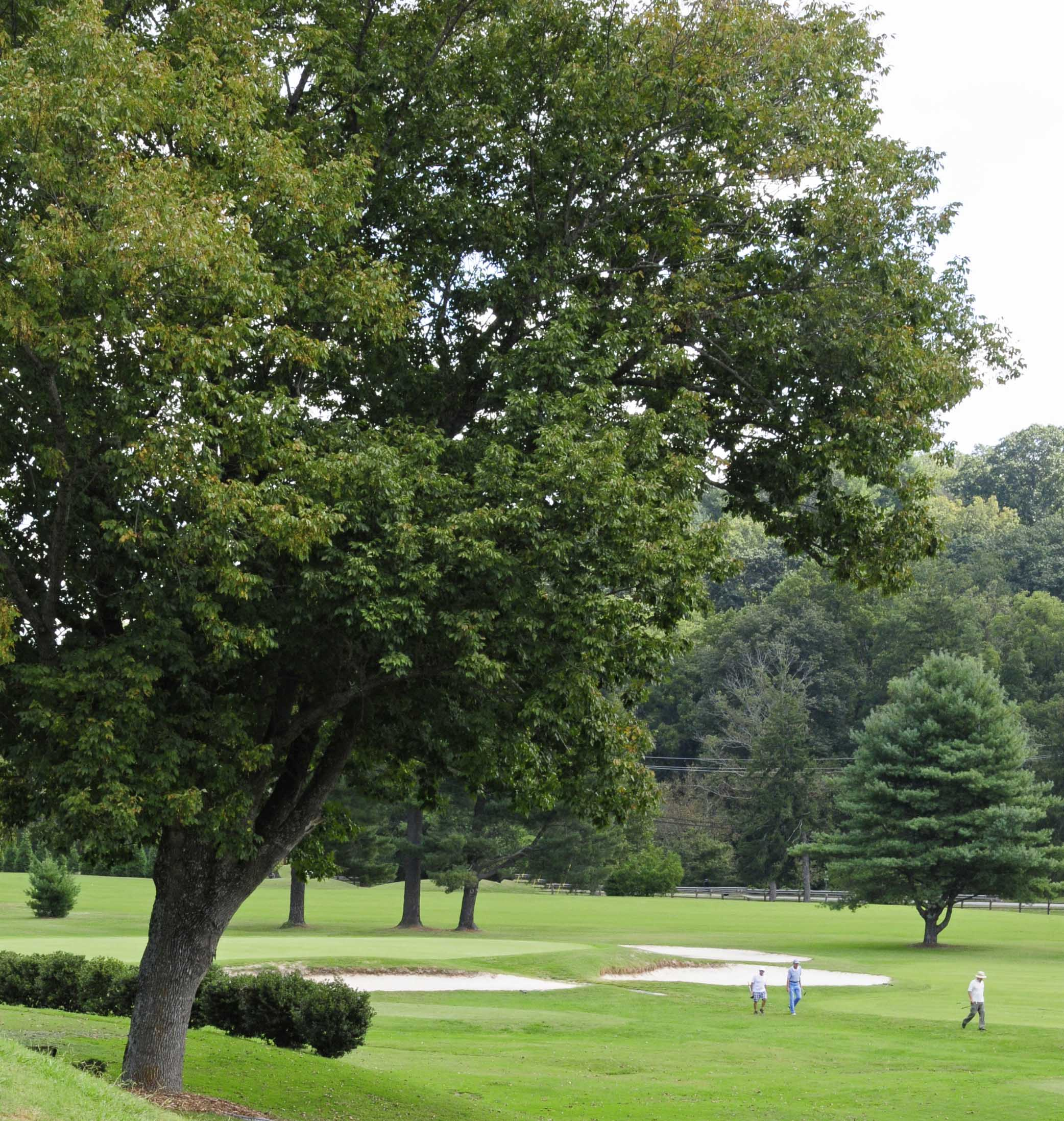
- Municipal Golf Course, September 2012

- Location within North Carolina Location within the United States
- Location: 226 Fairway Dr., Asheville, North Carolina
- Coordinates: 35°34′45″N 82°30′08″W
- Area: 129 acres (52 ha)
- Built: 1927
- Architect: Ross, Donald; Sayre, Christopher
- Architectural style: Golf course
- NRHP reference No.: 05000318
- Added to NRHP: April 20, 2005

Municipal Golf Course, also known as Buncombe County Golf Course, is a historic golf course and national historic district located at Asheville, Buncombe County, North Carolina. The district encompasses one contributing building (the Clubhouse (1927)) and one contributing site associated with a course designed by Donald Ross and opened in 1927. The Municipal Golf Course was the first municipal course in North Carolina to be racially integrated.

It was listed on the National Register of Historic Places in 2005.

In September 2024 the front nine holes of the Municipal Golf Course were severely damaged by flooding of the Swannanoa River caused by Hurricane Helene.
