= Taconic Golf Club =

Golf Course in Massachusetts

- Location within Massachusetts
- 42.705503°N 73.201863°W

Club information
- Location: Williamstown, Massachusetts, U.S.
- Established: 1896; 130 years ago
- Type: Semi-private
- Owner: Williams College
- Total holes: 18
- Website: taconicgolf.com

Taconic Golf Club
- Par: 71
- Course record: 64

Taconic Golf Club is a semi-private golf course located in Williamstown, Massachusetts. The land that Taconic Golf Club is owned by Williams College, but an independent Board of Directors oversees the daily operation. The course has repeatedly made Golf Magazine's list of the Top 100 Courses You Can Play and Golfweek's list of top collegiate campus courses, where it was most recently ranked 3rd in 2020. Golf Digest ranks Taconic as the 9th best course in the state of Massachusetts.

== History ==
In 1896, William Howard Doughty, James M. Ide, and Edward C. Gale received permission from Williams College to install three tomato cans on land adjoining what is now the 18th fairway of Taconic. In the same year, the course was expanded to seven holes; one of those holes, the present 17th, is the oldest at Taconic. In 1897, a longer nine-hole course was laid out.

In 1927, Wayne Stiles of Stiles & Van Kleek, a Boston firm, was commissioned to design and construct an 18 hole course. Construction began in August 1927 and a par 73 layout was completed by Labor Day in 1928. The course was revised in 1955 to a 6,640 yard (gold tees) par 71 layout. In 2009, Gil Hanse completed a renovation of the course.

== Course layout ==
Many of the greens are located on top of knolls or small hills. The property is approximately 100 acres (0.40 km^{2}). In general, the course provides plenty of room off the tee, with the real challenge being ahead at the green. The greens are often fast, with significant slope from back to front, and it is usually preferable to remain short of the hole rather than beyond the flag stick.

== Scorecard ==
Taconic Golf Club
| Tee | Rating/Slope | 1 | 2 | 3 | 4 | 5 | 6 | 7 | 8 | 9 | Out | 10 | 11 | 12 | 13 | 14 | 15 | 16 | 17 | 18 | In | Total |
| Black | M: 73.5 / 134 | 480 | 406 | 421 | 358 | 178 | 372 | 402 | 394 | 178 | 3189 | 506 | 478 | 377 | 403 | 163 | 441 | 460 | 246 | 545 | 3619 | 6808 |
| Gold | M: 71.8 / 131 | 470 | 355 | 383 | 346 | 157 | 356 | 368 | 382 | 167 | 2984 | 498 | 449 | 363 | 377 | 152 | 426 | 430 | 221 | 510 | 3426 | 6410 |
| Purple | M:68.9/128 W:74.8/129 | 450 | 339 | 373 | 318 | 135 | 335 | 350 | 360 | 152 | 2812 | 458 | 366 | 310 | 360 | 145 | 384 | 380 | 200 | 411 | 3014 | 5826 |
| White | M:65.8/117 W:70.5/123 | 391 | 324 | 344 | 256 | 126 | 257 | 293 | 297 | 143 | 2431 | 415 | 315 | 300 | 310 | 128 | 361 | 332 | 159 | 392 | 2712 | 5143 |
| Par | Men's and Women's | 5 | 4 | 4 | 4 | 3 | 4 | 4 | 4 | 3 | 35 | 5 | 4 | 4 | 4 | 3 | 4 | 4 | 3 | 5 | 36 | 71 |
| SI | Men's | 14 | 8 | 2 | 12 | 16 | 4 | 6 | 10 | 18 | | 13 | 3 | 7 | 5 | 17 | 9 | 1 | 11 | 15 |
| SI | Women's | 12 | 6 | 2 | 14 | 16 | 10 | 4 | 8 | 18 | | 1 | 15 | 7 | 5 | 17 | 9 | 3 | 11 | 13 |

== Tournaments hosted ==
| Year | Tournament | Winner |
|---|---|---|
| 1956 | U.S. Junior Amateur | (United States) Harlan Stevenson |
| 1958 | NCAA Division I Men's Golf Championships | University of Houston |
| 1959 | Massachusetts Amateur | (United States) John Tosca Jr. |
| 1963 | U.S. Women's Amateur | (United States) Anne Quast |
| 1971 | Massachusetts Amateur | (United States) Tracy Mehr |
| 1972 | NCAA Division II Men's Golf Championships | LSU-New Orleans |
| 1981 | Massachusetts Amateur | (United States) Steven Tasho |
| 1992 | Massachusetts Open | (United States) Andy Morse |
| 1996 | U.S. Senior Amateur | (United States) O. Gordon Brewer Jr. |
| 1999 | NCAA Division III Men's Golf Championships | Methodist University |
| 2004 | Massachusetts Amateur | (United States) Frank Vana Jr. |
| 2016 | Massachusetts Amateur | (United States) Brendan Hunter |

=== U.S. Junior Amateur ===
In 1956, Harlan Stevenson of California defeated Jack Rule, Jr. of Iowa 3 and 1. Rule beat 16-year-old Jack Nicklaus in the semifinals 1 up. Nicklaus made a hole-in-one on the 14th hole at Taconic during a practice round, where an engraved rock commemorates this accomplishment.
