= Nassau Open =

Golf tournament formerly on the PGA Tour

Tournament information
- Location: Nassau, Bahamas
- Established: 1934
- Course: Bahamas Golf Club
- Tour: PGA Tour
- Format: Stroke play
- Final year: 1937

Final champion
- (United States) Sam Snead

The Nassau Open was a golf tournament on the PGA Tour from 1934 to 1937. It was inaugurated as the British Colonial Open, and was played at the Bahamas Golf Club in Nassau, in The Bahamas. Having been rescheduled, the fifth edition of the tournament was then cancelled shortly before it was due to be staged in January 1939.

The winner of the final event was Sam Snead.

== Winners ==
Year	Winner	Score	Refs
Nassau Open
1939	Tournament cancelled		
1938	No tournament due to rescheduling (Note: Earlier events were staged in December, but the fifth renewal was rescheduled to January 1939.)		
1937	(United States) Sam Snead	276 (−4)	
1936	(Scotland) Willie MacFarlane	266 (−6)	
British Colonial Open
1935	(United States) Leo Mallory	271 (−1)	
1934	(Scotland) Bobby Cruickshank	267 (−5)	
