= Hyannis Port, Massachusetts =

Village located in Barnstable, Massachusetts

Coordinates: 41°37′55″N 70°18′10″W

Location of ZIP code 02647 (Hyannis Port) within the Town and County of Barnstable, and the Commonwealth of Massachusetts

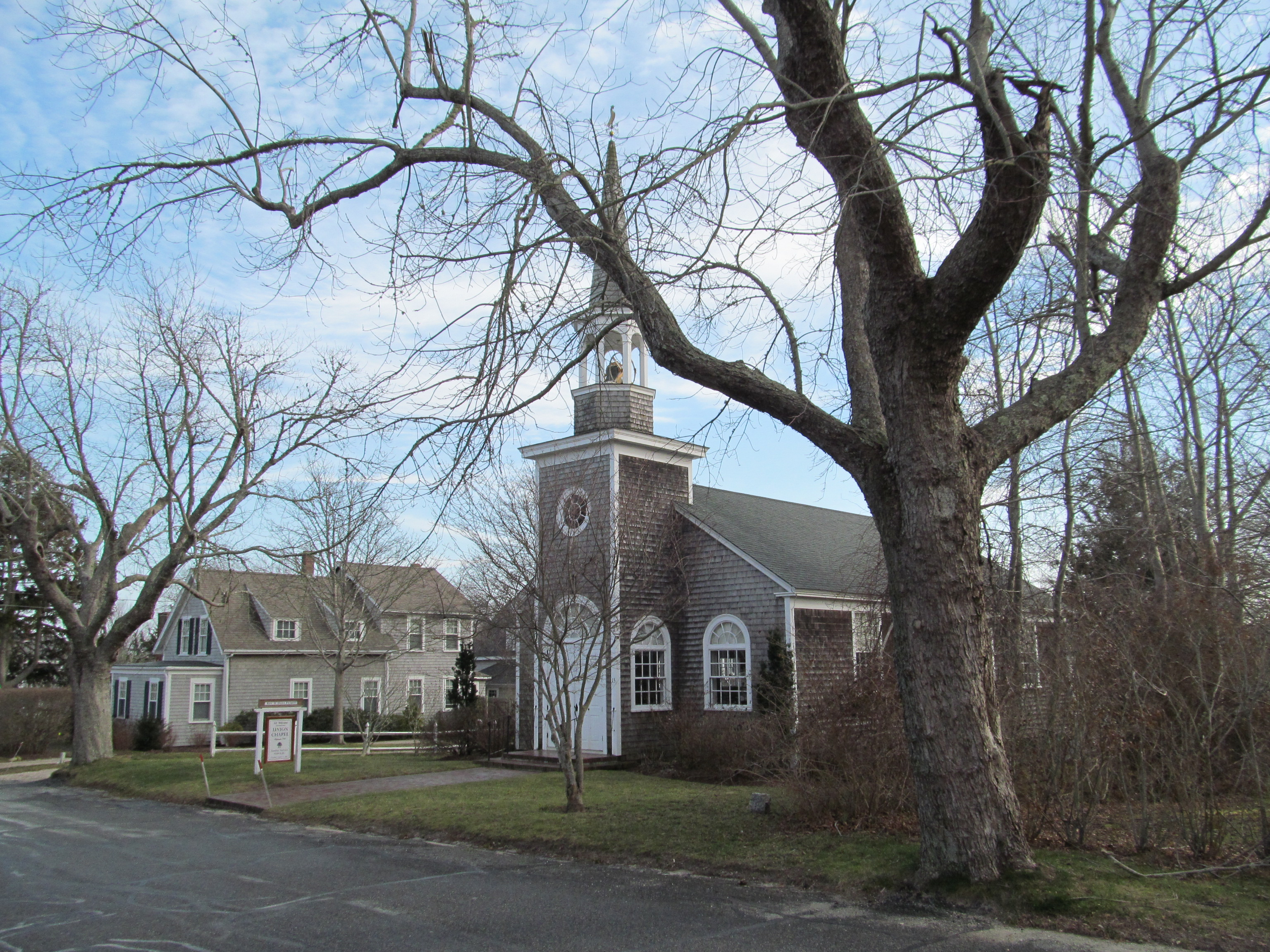
Union Chapel

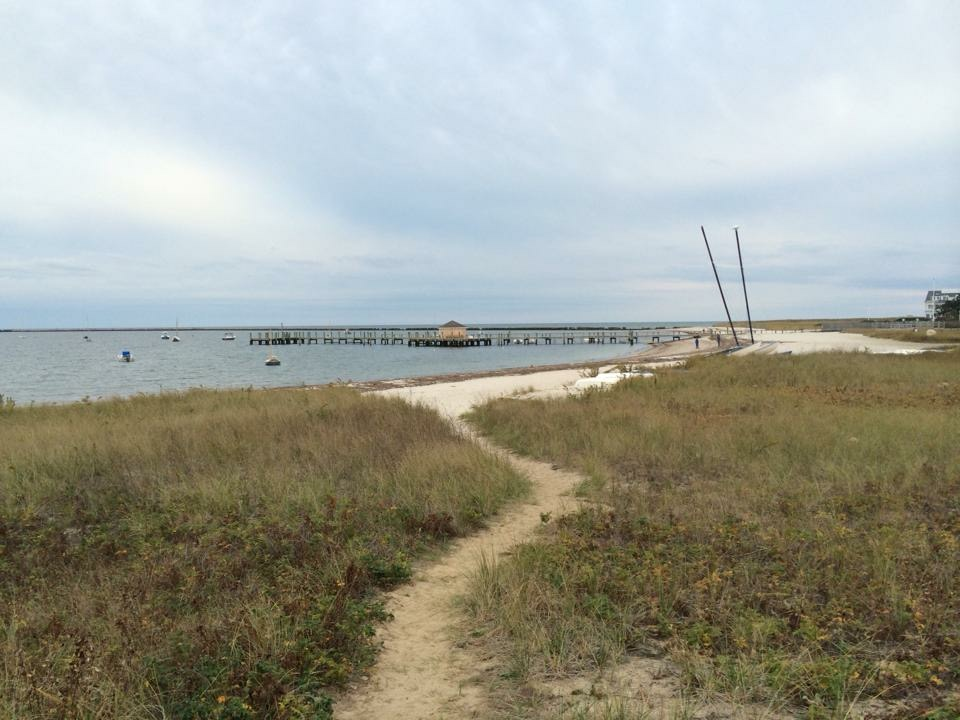
View of Hyannisport Yacht Club

Hyannis Port (or Hyannisport) is a village located in the town of Barnstable, Massachusetts, United States. It is a summer community on Hyannis Harbor, 1.4 miles (2.3 km) to the south-southwest of the Barnstable village of Hyannis.

== Community ==
It has a post office next door to a seasonal convenience store, The News Shop and Gallery. It has one of the premier golf courses on Cape Cod, the Hyannisport Club, and is also home to the West Beach Club and the Hyannis Port Yacht Club. St. Andrew's-by-the-Sea Episcopal Church and the Union Chapel conduct Sunday services in the summer. There also is a catwalk that goes to Halls Island with views of Nantucket Sound and a golf course.

== Kennedy residences ==
Hyannis Port is the location of the Kennedy Compound and other Kennedy family residences and, as such, is included in the National Register of Historic Places. There are three Kennedy houses on the compound: Rose's, Jack's, and Ethel's. (Ted's house was nearby but not in the compound itself.) Rose was the oldest resident in the town of Barnstable when she died in Hyannis Port at age 104.

== Demographics ==
According to the 2000 U.S. census on April 1, it had 193 housing units with a resident population of 115 persons living in 46 housing units. There were 147 vacant housing units (76%), 144 of which were for seasonal, recreational, or occasional use.
