= Jesse Guilford =

American amateur golfer

Personal information
- Full name: Jesse Poore Guilford
- Nickname: Siege Gun
- Nationality: United States
- Born: March 2, 1895 Manchester, New Hampshire, U.S.
- Died: December 1, 1962 (aged 67) Newton, Massachusetts, U.S.

Career
- Sport: Golf
- Status: Amateur
- Professional wins: 2

Number of wins by tour
- PGA Tour: 2

Best results in major championships (wins: 1)
- Masters Tournament: DNP
- PGA Championship: DNP
- U.S. Open: T19: 1922
- The Open Championship: DNP
- U.S. Amateur: Won: 1921
- British Amateur: R32: 1926, 1934

Jesse Poore Guilford (March 2, 1895 – December 1, 1962) was an American amateur golfer. He is most notable for winning the U.S. Amateur in 1921.

== Early life ==
Guilford was born in Manchester, New Hampshire, he was the son of Robert M. Guilford and Agnes Jane Chambers.

== Golf career ==
He was one of the top amateur golfers in Massachusetts, as well as the United States. His nickname was "Siege Gun" for his long drive qualities. He played on three of the first four Walker Cup teams (1922, 1924, and 1926).

== Personal life ==
The 1930 U.S. Census for Newton, Middlesex, Massachusetts, records him married to Louise B., with three daughters, Catherine, Mary L., and Jean, and son Jesse P.

Guilford died in Newton, Massachusetts.

== Amateur wins ==
- 1913 New Hampshire Amateur
- 1916 Massachusetts Amateur, New Hampshire Amateur
- 1917 New Hampshire Amateur
- 1921 Massachusetts Amateur, **U.S. Amateur**, Miami Invitational
- 1923 Gold Mashie Tournament
- 1924 Massachusetts Amateur
- 1926 Gold Mashie Tournament

Note: Amateur majors championship wins shown in bold.

== Professional wins (2) ==
=== PGA Tour wins (2) ===
- 1919 Massachusetts Open (as an amateur)
- 1929 Massachusetts Open (as an amateur)

== Major championships ==
=== Amateur wins (1) ===
Year	Championship	Winning score	Runner-up
1921	U.S. Amateur	7 & 6	(United States) Robert A. Gardner

=== Results timeline ===
Guilford never played in the Masters Tournament or the British Open. As an amateur, he could not play in the PGA Championship.

Tournament	1914	1915	1916	1917	1918	1919
U.S. Open				NT	NT	T24
U.S. Amateur	R16	R32	SF	NT	NT	
British Amateur		NT	NT	NT	NT	NT

Tournament	1920	1921	1922	1923	1924	1925	1926	1927	1928	1929
U.S. Open		T26	T19		T29					
U.S. Amateur	DNQ	**1**	QF M	QF	QF	QF	R16			
British Amateur		R128					R32			

Tournament	1930	1931	1932	1933	1934	1935	1936	1937	1938	1939
U.S. Amateur			SF	DNQ	R128	R256	R128			
British Amateur					R32					

Tournament	1940	1941	1942	1943	1944	1945	1946	1947	1948	1949
U.S. Amateur			NT	NT	NT	NT				
British Amateur	NT	NT	NT	NT	NT	NT				

Tournament	1950	1951	1952	1953	1954	1955	1956	1957
U.S. Amateur								R128
British Amateur								

Win
Top 10
Did not play

M = Medalist
NT = No tournament
DNQ = Did not qualify for match play portion
R256, R128, R64, R32, R16, QF, SF = Round in which player lost in match play
"T" indicates a tie for a place

Source for U.S. Open & U.S. Amateur: USGA Championship Database

Source for 1921 British Amateur: The American Golfer, June 4, 1921, pg. 24.

Source for 1926 British Amateur: The American Golfer, July, 1926, pg. 58.

Source for 1934 British Amateur: The Montreal Gazette, May 25, 1934, pg. 13.

== U.S. national team appearances ==
Amateur

- Walker Cup: 1922 (winners), 1924 (winners), 1926 (winners)
