= 1925 U.S. Open (golf) =

Coordinates: 42.324°N 71.78°W

Tournament information
- Dates: June 3–5, 1925
- Location: Worcester, Massachusetts
- Course: Worcester Country Club
- Organized by: USGA
- Format: Stroke play − 72 holes

Statistics
- Par: 71
- Length: 6,430 yards (5,880 m)
- Field: 94
- Cut: none
- Winner's share: $500

Champion
- (Scotland) Willie Macfarlane
- 291 (+7), playoff

Location in the United States
Location in Massachusetts

The 1925 U.S. Open was the 29th U.S. Open, held June 3–5 at Worcester Country Club in Worcester, Massachusetts. Scottish pro Willie Macfarlane won the 36-hole playoff by one stroke on the final hole to secure his only major championship and deny Bobby Jones his second Open, which he won the following year.

This was the last year that the first two rounds of the U.S. Open were played on the same day. Francis Ouimet, the 1913 champion, held the lead after the first round on Wednesday morning. Macfarlane tied Leo Diegel for the second round lead after a 67 that established a new tournament record. Macfarlane carded a 72 in the third round that gave him a one-stroke lead over Johnny Farrell. Macfarlane, however, struggled in the final round on Thursday afternoon on his way to a 78 and 291 total. That was still good enough to tie Jones, who shot 74 after a 70 in the morning. Farrell and Ouimet (who was playing in his final Open), shot 78 and 76, respectively, to finish a shot out of the playoff.

The 18-hole playoff on Friday morning ended in a tie, with both Macfarlane and Jones at 75. In the era before sudden-death, another full round was required to break the tie, and it was held that afternoon. Jones took a four-stroke lead after nine, but Macfarlane managed to tie after recording birdies at 10 and 13, while Jones bogeyed 13. The match was still all square heading to the 18th tee. Macfarlane found the green on his approach while Jones hit into a bunker. After Jones failed to get up-and-down, Macfarlane two-putted for the title. Macfarlane was the first Scot to win the Open in fifteen years, since Alex Smith in 1910.

During the first round, Jones was getting set to hit an iron shot out of the rough on the 11th hole when he felt his club move the ball ever so slightly. No one else seemed to have seen this movement, but Jones called a penalty on himself. After officials were unable to confirm that the ball had actually moved, they allowed Jones to make his own ruling on whether or not he should be penalized. Jones said he was certain the ball had moved and penalized himself. The decision cost him the title, but forever added to Jones's legacy. Spectators praised him for his sportsmanship, but he would have none of it. He flatly replied, "You might as well praise me for not robbing a bank." Because there were so many players with a chance on the final nine of regulation and both playoff rounds were drama-filled, William D. Richardson of The New York Times called it "easily the greatest Open Championship of them all."

== Round summaries ==
=== First round ===
Wednesday, June 3, 1925 (morning)

Place	Player	Score	To par
1	(United States) Francis Ouimet (a)	70	−1
T2	(United States) Johnny Farrell	71	E
T2	(United States) Jack Forrester	71	E
T4	(United States) Al Espinosa	72	+1
T4	(United States) Walter Hagen	72	+1
T4	(United States) Willie Klein	72	+1
T4	(United States) Gene Sarazen	72	+1
T8	(United States) Tom Boyd	73	−1
T8	(United States) Leo Diegel	73	−1
T8	(United States) Francis Gallett	73	−1
T8	(United States) Macdonald Smith	73	−1

=== Second round ===
Wednesday, June 3, 1925 (afternoon)

Place	Player	Score	To par
T1	(United States) Leo Diegel	73-68=141	−1
T1	(Scotland) Willie Macfarlane	74-67=141	−1
T3	(United States) Al Espinosa	72-71=143	+1
T3	(United States) Francis Gallet	73-70=143	+1
T3	(United States) Francis Ouimet (a)	70-73=143	+1
6	(United States) Gene Sarazen	72-72=144	+2
7	(United States) Johnny Farrell	71-74=145	+3
T8	(Scotland) Laurie Ayton, Snr	75-71=146	+4
T8	(United States) Mike Brady	74-72=146	+4
T10	(United States) Jack Forrester	71-76=147	+5
T10	(United States) Bobby Jones (a)	77-70=147	+5

=== Third round ===
Thursday, June 4, 1925 (morning)

Place	Player	Score	To par
1	(Scotland) Willie Macfarlane	74-67-72=213	E
2	(United States) Johnny Farrell	71-74-69=214	+1
3	(United States) Francis Ouimet (a)	70-73-73=216	+3
T4	(United States) Al Espinosa	72-71-74=217	+4
T4	(United States) Bobby Jones (a)	77-70-70=217	+4
6	(United States) Leo Diegel	73-68-77=218	+5
T7	(Scotland) Laurie Ayton, Snr	75-71-73=219	+6
T7	(United States) Walter Hagen	72-76-71=219	+6
T7	(United States) Gene Sarazen	72-72-75=219	+6
10	(United States) Mike Brady	74-72-74=220	+7

=== Final round ===
Thursday, June 4, 1925 (afternoon)

Place	Player	Score	To par	Money ($)
T1	(Scotland) Willie Macfarlane	74-67-72-78=291	+7	Playoff
T1	(United States) Bobby Jones (a)	77-70-70-74=291	+7	Playoff
T3	(United States) Johnny Farrell	71-74-69-78=292	+8	300
T3	(United States) Francis Ouimet (a)	70-73-73-76=292	+8	0
T5	(United States) Walter Hagen	72-76-71-74=293	+9	175
T5	(United States) Gene Sarazen	72-72-75-74=293	+9	175
7	(United States) Mike Brady	74-72-74-74=294	+10	100
8	(United States) Leo Diegel	73-68-77-78=296	+12	90
T9	(Scotland) Laurie Ayton, Snr	75-71-73-78=297	+13	78
T9	(United States) Al Espinosa	72-71-74-80=297	+13	78

=== Playoff ===
Friday, June 5, 1925

Player	Score	To par
(Scotland) Willie Macfarlane	75	+4
(United States) Bobby Jones (a)	75	+4

Hole	1	2	3	4	5	6	7	8	9	10	11	12	13	14	15	16	17	18
Par	4	5	4	3	5	3	4	3	4	3	4	4	3	4	5	4	5	4
(Scotland) Macfarlane	E	+1	E	E	−1	−1	E	+1	+2	+2	+2	+3	+4	+4	+4	+4	+4	+4
(United States) Jones	E	E	E	E	E	E	E	+1	+3	+4	+4	+5	+5	+4	+4	+5	+4	+4

2nd playoff – (afternoon)

Place	Player	Score	To par	Money ($)
1	(Scotland) Willie Macfarlane	72	+1	500
2	(United States) Bobby Jones (a)	73	+2	0

Hole	1	2	3	4	5	6	7	8	9	10	11	12	13	14	15	16	17	18
Par	4	5	4	3	5	3	4	3	4	3	4	4	3	4	5	4	5	4
(Scotland) Macfarlane	E	E	E	+1	+1	+2	+2	+3	+4	+3	+3	+3	+2	+2	+2	+2	+1	+1
(United States) Jones	E	E	E	E	−1	E	E	E	E	E	E	E	+1	+1	+2	+2	+1	+2

Eagle	Birdie	Bogey	Double bogey	Triple bogey+
