= Oakley Country Club =

Golf club in Watertown, Massachusetts

Coordinates: 42°22′35″N 71°10′08″W

Oakley Country Club is a private 18-hole golf club in Watertown, Massachusetts, United States. The club was founded in 1898 and reportedly served Bobby Jones while he was attending Harvard. The golf course was designed by Donald Ross in 1901.

The club's original clubhouse was lost due to a fire in the 1960s. In 2024, the clubhouse again caught fire.

In 2014, the club gained attention as the venue for an insider trading scheme by several of its members.
