= Willie Macfarlane =

Scottish professional golfer (1889–1961)

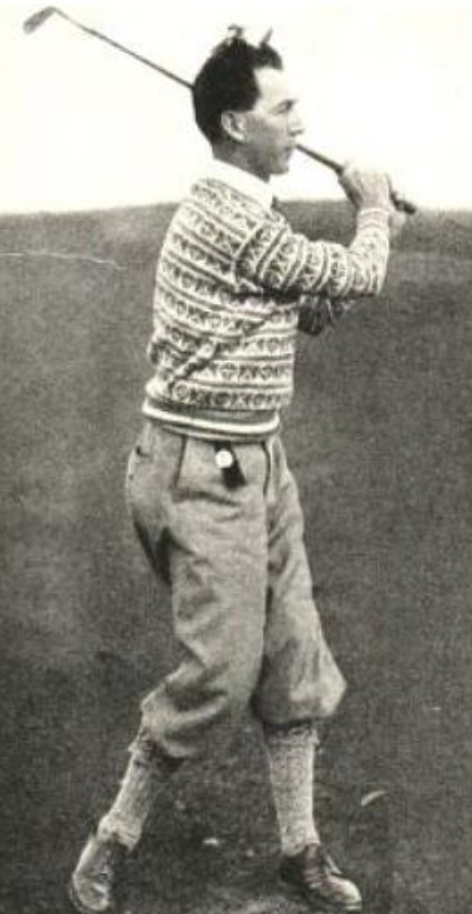
- Macfarlane in 1925

Personal information
- Full name: William Macfarlane
- Nationality: Scotland
- Born: 29 June 1889 Aberdeen, Scotland
- Died: 15 August 1961 (aged 72) London, England

Career
- Sport: Golf
- Status: Professional
- Former tour: PGA Tour
- Professional wins: 23

Number of wins by tour
- PGA Tour: 20

Best results in major championships (wins: 1)
- Masters Tournament: 6th: 1934
- PGA Championship: T3: 1916
- U.S. Open: Won: 1925
- The Open Championship: DNP

William Macfarlane (29 June 1889 – 15 August 1961) was a Scottish professional golfer.

== Career ==
Macfarlane was born in Aberdeen, Scotland.

Like many British golfers of his era, he took a position as a club professional in the United States. In 1925 he won the U.S. Open at Worcester Country Club in Worcester, Massachusetts. He tied Bobby Jones over 72 holes, with both men shooting 291. Macfarlane had set a new U.S. Open single round low-score of 67 in the second round. The two men played an 18-hole playoff and both of them shot 75. Macfarlane won a second 18-hole playoff by 72 shots to 73.

Macfarlane played in the U.S. Open 16 times, but only had one other top-10 finish. He won 21 times on the PGA Tour.

== Personal life ==
Macfarlane died in Miami, Florida.

== Professional wins (21) ==
=== PGA Tour wins (20) ===
- 1917 (1) War Relief Tournament (Englewood)
- 1921 (1) Philadelphia Open Championship
- 1924 (1) Westchester Open
- 1925 (2) **U.S. Open**, Shawnee Open
- 1928 (1) Shawnee Open
- 1930 (3) Metropolitan Open, Westchester Open, Mid-South Open Bestball (with Wiffy Cox)
- 1931 (2) Miami International Four-Ball (with Wiffy Cox), Kenwood Open
- 1932 (1) St. Petersburg Open
- 1933 (4) Metropolitan Open, Mid-South Pro-Pro (with Paul Runyan), Mid-South Open (tie with Paul Runyan and Joe Turnesa)
- 1934 (1) Pennsylvania Open Championship
- 1935 (2) Florida West Coast Open, Glens Falls Open
- 1936 (2) Walter Olson Golf Tournament (tie with Tommy Armour), Nassau Open

Major championship is shown in bold.

=== Other wins (3) ===
Note: This list is probably incomplete.

- 1916 Rockland CC Four-Ball
- 1922 Westchester Open
- 1933 Miami Biltmore Open (December)

== Major championships ==
=== Wins (1) ===
Year	Championship	54 holes	Winning score	Margin	Runner-up
1925	U.S. Open	1 shot lead	+7 (74-67-72-78=291)	Playoff ^{1}	(United States) Bobby Jones

^{1} Defeated Jones in second 18-hole playoff – Macfarlane 75-72=147 (+5), Jones 75-73=148 (+6).

=== Result timeline ===
Tournament	1912	1913	1914	1915	1916	1917	1918	1919
U.S. Open	T18	WD	WD	T35		NT	NT	
PGA Championship	NYF	NYF	NYF	NYF	SF	NT	NT	

Tournament	1920	1921	1922	1923	1924	1925	1926	1927	1928	1929
U.S. Open	T8		WD			**1**	T20	T18	T14	T27
PGA Championship	R32			QF	R16				R16	

Tournament	1930	1931	1932	1933	1934	1935	1936	1937	1938	1939
Masters Tournament	NYF	NYF	NYF	NYF	6	T31		T19	38	
U.S. Open	T43		CUT			T47		T47	T32	
PGA Championship		R16						R32		

Tournament	1940	1941	1942	1943	1944	1945	1946
Masters Tournament				NT	NT	NT	
U.S. Open			NT	NT	NT	NT	WD
PGA Championship				NT			

Note: Macfarlane never played in The Open Championship.

Win
Top 10
Did not play

NYF = tournament not yet founded
NT = no tournament
WD = withdrew
CUT = missed the half-way cut
R32, R16, QF, SF = round in which player lost in PGA Championship match play
"T" indicates a tie for a place

=== Summary ===
Tournament	Wins	2nd	3rd	Top-5	Top-10	Top-25	Events	Cuts made
Masters Tournament	0	0	0	0	1	2	4	4
U.S. Open	1	0	0	1	2	6	16	12
The Open Championship	0	0	0	0	0	0	0	0
PGA Championship	0	0	1	2	5	7	7	7
Totals	1	0	1	3	8	15	27	23

- Most consecutive cuts made – 10 (1923 PGA – 1931 PGA)
- Longest streak of top-10s – 3 (1923 PGA – 1925 U.S. Open)

== See also ==
- List of golfers with most PGA Tour wins
