= Donald Ross (golf course architect) =

Scottish-American golf course designer (1872–1948)

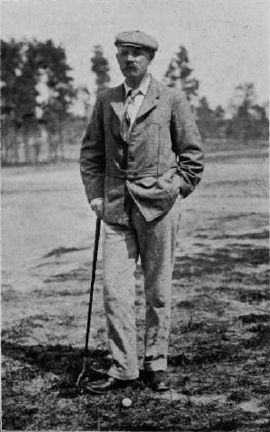
- Ross in 1905

Personal information
- Full name: Donald James Ross
- Nationality: Scotland; United States
- Born: November 23, 1872 Dornoch, Scotland
- Died: April 26, 1948 (aged 75) Pinehurst, North Carolina, U.S.

Career
- Sport: Golf
- Status: Professional

Best results in major championships
- Masters Tournament: DNP
- PGA Championship: DNP
- U.S. Open: 5th: 1903
- The Open Championship: T8: 1910

Achievements and awards
- World Golf Hall of Fame: 1977 (member page)

Donald James Ross (November 23, 1872 – April 26, 1948) was a Scottish professional golfer and golf course designer. Ross was born and raised in Scotland but moved to the United States as a young man. Ross designed dozens of courses across North America and is generally regarded as one of the top golf course designers of all time.

== Early life ==
Ross was born in Dornoch, Scotland. Ross got his first job at the Royal Dornoch Golf Club, where he played while growing up, working as a greens keeper. Ross started his career by being an apprentice to Old Tom Morris at St Andrews in Scotland around 1899.

Ross, along with his younger brother Alec were founding members of The Tin Whistles in 1904.

== Professional career ==
With the help of an American agronomy student and fellow Scotsman Robert White from St. Andrews, Ross decided to move to America. Ross invested all his life savings to move to the United States and walked off the boat with only $2. After his year long apprenticeship he went back to the Royal Dornoch Golf Club where he honed his playing abilities while also taking care of the greens and making clubs.

Ross learned several skills related to golf throughout his life such as greens keeping, club making, course architecture, and being a club professional. Later in 1899, with the encouragement and support of Harvard astronomy professor Robert W. Willson, he obtained his first job in America at Oakley Country Club in Watertown, Massachusetts. In 1900, he was appointed as the golf professional at the Pinehurst Resort in North Carolina, where he began his course design career and eventually designed four courses. He then began running a substantial practice with summer offices in Little Compton, Rhode Island. At its height, Donald J. Ross and Associates, as his practice was known, oversaw the work of thousands of people. However, Ross always kept up his professional golf standing.

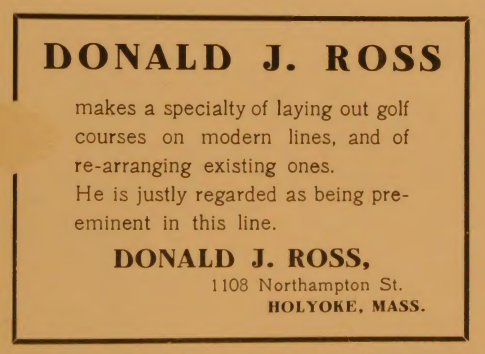
A 1915 ad for Ross's design services, as seen in The American Golfer

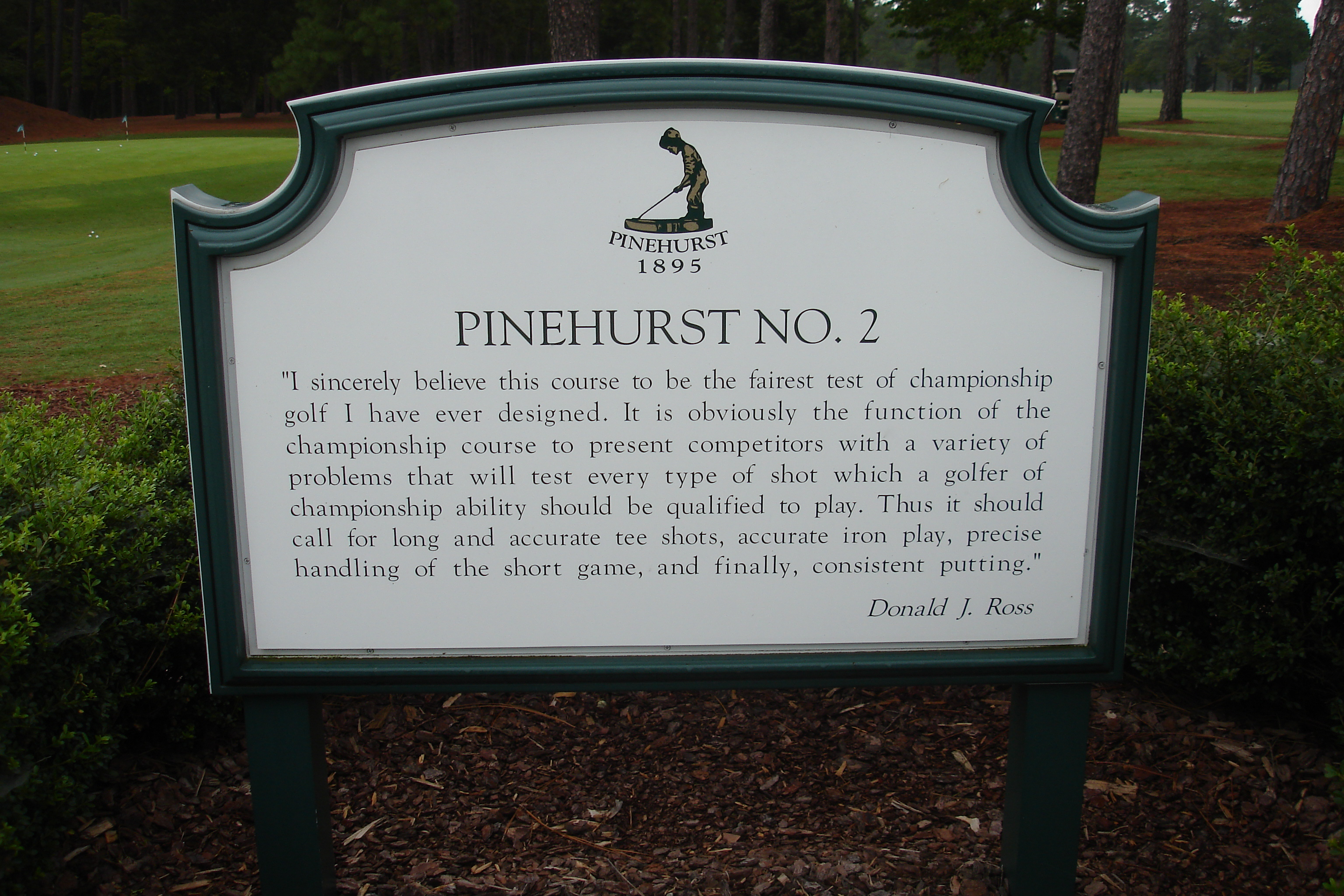
Pinehurst Course No. 2 in North Carolina

Ross won three North and South Opens (1903, 1905, 1906) and two Massachusetts Opens (1905, 1911). He also finished fifth in the 1903 U.S. Open and eighth in the 1910 Open Championship. As his fame grew, he began to teach and play less and to focus on golf course design.

While working at the Oakley Country Club, Ross had left an impression on the president of the Boston Athletic Association at the time, Edward E. Babb. During an exchange in 1910 between Babb and Joseph L. Wyckoff, a business partner of stationery maker White & Wyckoff in Holyoke, Massachusetts, Wyckoff remarked that he wished to find a man who "really knew about the laying out a golf course" for the Mount Tom Golf Club, today known as Wyckoff Country Club. Babb introduced Wyckoff to Ross later that year, bringing him back to the course, where he suggested key changes, but was unable to prepare plans as he had just signed a two-year contract as professional for the Essex County Country Club. Completing this contract he returned to Holyoke in 1914 where he was put up in a house built for him by Wyckoff, who as an executive committee member of the Massachusetts Golf Association, saw himself as a patron of Ross, and offered him financial backing to move from being both an architect and golf pro, to focusing his career mainly in golf course architecture. It is unknown what duration or regularity Ross lived in Holyoke, as he travelled often, even spending time designing a course in Cuba during his tenure in Manchester that previous year, though a Boston Herald article still placed him in Holyoke in 1919. He would work with the Mount Tom Club for many years, welcoming Holyoke neighbors visiting his winter home in Pinehurst, completing a full redesign of the Mt. Tom course by 1922, and later serving as a pallbearer for Wyckoff following his death in 1931. Ross's work in Holyoke would remain largely untouched until the construction of I-91 in 1965 left only 5 fairways of his design today.

Although Ross was a competitive golfer, he is primarily known for his work as a course designer. In his time as a designer he is credited with roughly 400 course designs or redesigns between 1900 and 1948. Some of his early work was in Virginia and includes Jefferson Lakeside Country Club and Sewell's Point Golf Course. He also designed the Municipal Golf Course at Asheville, North Carolina in 1927. Ross also designed Whippoorwill Country Club, in Armonk, New York; however, Charles Banks was hired by Whippoorwill to redesign the course in 1928. He also designed a 9-hole course in northern New York, known as the Schroon Lake Municipal Golf Club in 1918. He designed the Hope Valley Country Club in Durham, North Carolina in 1927.

In the 1930s, he revolutionized greenskeeping practices in the southern United States when he oversaw the transition of the putting surfaces at Pinehurst No. 2 from oiled sand to Bermuda grass. Ross also designed the course at Sedgefield Country Club in Greensboro, North Carolina. Currently, Sedgefield Country Club is one of only three regular Donald Ross designs on the PGA Tour.

=== Design elements ===
What allows a Donald Ross golf course to stand out is the design principles and elements he used. He displayed great attention to detail. Often he created challenging courses with very little earth moving; according to Jack Nicklaus, "His stamp as an architect was naturalness." Some of his designs include the "turtleback" greens, a Ross double plateau, and The Punchbowl. The route the golfer had to take was an important decision Ross had to make and he favored very clear routes that would not require much walking. When he would design a par-4 hole, he favored an uphill short hole. Ross often created holes which invited run-up shots but had severe trouble at the back of the green, typically in the form of fall-away slopes. All of these exemplify his naturalness design philosophy which did not require intense earth moving, he simply let the lay of the land dictate what each and every hole should be. Ross would go into designing a new course with the thought to "make each hole present a different problem. So arrange it that every stroke must be made with a full concentration and attention necessary to good golf. Build each hole in such a manner that it waste none of the ground at my disposal and takes advantage of every possibility I can see." His most widely known trademark is the crowned or "turtleback" green, most famously seen on Pinehurst No. 2, though golf architecture writer Ron Whitten argued in Golf Digest in 2005 that the effect had become exaggerated compared to Ross's intention because greenkeeping practices at Pinehurst had raised the center of the greens.

== Death ==
Ross died while completing his final design at Raleigh Country Club in North Carolina. He is buried in Newton Cemetery in Newton, Massachusetts.

== Awards and honors ==
- Ross was a founding member and first president of the American Society of Golf Course Architects, which was formed at Pinehurst in 1947.
- Ross was admitted to the World Golf Hall of Fame in 1977.

== Professional wins (5) ==
- 1903 North and South Open
- 1905 Massachusetts Open, North and South Open
- 1906 North and South Open
- 1911 Massachusetts Open

== Results in major championships ==
Tournament	1897	1898	1899	1900	1901	1902	1903	1904	1905	1906	1907	1908	1909	1910
U.S. Open	DNP	DNP	WD	DNP	21	9	5	10	25	DNP	10	T40	DNP	DNP
The Open Championship	CUT	DNP	DNP	DNP	DNP	DNP	DNP	DNP	DNP	DNP	DNP	DNP	DNP	T8

DNP = Did not play
WD = Withdrew
CUT = missed the half-way cut
"T" indicates a tie for a place
Yellow background for top-10

== See also ==
- List of golf courses designed by Donald Ross
