= 2002 Players Championship =

Tournament information
- Dates: March 21–24, 2002
- Location: Ponte Vedra Beach, Florida; 30.198°N 81.394°W
- Courses: TPC Sawgrass, Stadium Course
- Tour: PGA Tour

Statistics
- Par: 72
- Length: 7,093 yards (6,486 m)
- Field: 149 players, 75 after cut
- Cut: 146 (+2)
- Prize fund: $6.0 million
- Winner's share: $1.08 million

Champion
- (New Zealand) Craig Perks
- 280 (−8)

Location map
- Location in the United States Location in Florida

The 2002 Players Championship was a golf tournament in Florida on the PGA Tour, held March 21–24 at TPC Sawgrass in Ponte Vedra Beach, southeast of Jacksonville. It was the 29th Players Championship.

Unheralded Craig Perks gained his only career win on the PGA Tour, two strokes ahead of runner-up Stephen Ames. In the last three holes, Perks chipped in twice; for eagle at 16 and for par at 18. In between, he made a 25-foot (7.6 m) birdie putt on the Island Green; he had only two pars in the last fourteen holes.

Starting the year at 256 in the world rankings, Perks moved from 203 to 64 with the win.

Defending champion Tiger Woods finished seven strokes back, in a tie for fourteenth place.

== Venue ==
This was the 21st Players Championship held at the TPC at Sawgrass Stadium Course and it remained at 7,093 yards (6,486 m).

== Field ==
Fulton Allem, Robert Allenby, Stephen Ames, Billy Andrade, Stuart Appleby, Woody Austin, Paul Azinger, Briny Baird, Craig Barlow, Cameron Beckman, Rich Beem, Notah Begay III, David Berganio Jr., Thomas Bjørn, Jay Don Blake, Mark Brooks, Olin Browne, Ángel Cabrera, Mark Calcavecchia, Michael Campbell, Jim Carter, Greg Chalmers, Brandel Chamblee, K. J. Choi, Stewart Cink, Michael Clark II, Darren Clarke, John Cook, Fred Couples, John Daly, Robert Damron, Glen Day, Chris DiMarco, Scott Dunlap, Joe Durant, David Duval, Joel Edwards, Steve Elkington, Ernie Els, Bob Estes, Nick Faldo, Niclas Fasth, Brad Faxon, Steve Flesch, Dan Forsman, Carlos Franco, Harrison Frazar, David Frost, Ed Fryatt, Fred Funk, Jim Furyk, Sergio García, Brian Gay, Brent Geiberger, Matt Gogel, Retief Goosen, David Gossett, Paul Gow, Jay Haas, Pádraig Harrington, Dudley Hart, J. P. Hayes, J. J. Henry, Tim Herron, Glen Hnatiuk, Scott Hoch, Charles Howell III, John Huston, Lee Janzen, Miguel Ángel Jiménez, Brandt Jobe, Per-Ulrik Johansson, Steve Jones, Shingo Katayama, Jonathan Kaye, Jerry Kelly, Skip Kendall, Tom Kite, Greg Kraft, Matt Kuchar, Neal Lancaster, Bernhard Langer, Paul Lawrie, Ian Leggatt, Tom Lehman, Justin Leonard, J. L. Lewis, Frank Lickliter, Davis Love III, Steve Lowery, Jeff Maggert, Shigeki Maruyama, Len Mattiace, Bob May, Billy Mayfair, Scott McCarron, Paul McGinley, Rocco Mediate, Phil Mickelson, Larry Mize, Colin Montgomerie, Michael Muehr, Frank Nobilo, Greg Norman, Mark O'Meara, Geoff Ogilvy, José María Olazábal, Jesper Parnevik, Craig Parry, Carl Paulson, Dennis Paulson, Corey Pavin, David Peoples, Craig Perks, Tom Pernice Jr., Kenny Perry, Nick Price, Brett Quigley, Chris Riley, Loren Roberts, Rory Sabbatini, Tom Scherrer, Adam Scott, Scott Simpson, Joey Sindelar, Vijay Singh, Jeff Sluman, Chris Smith, Jerry Smith, Mike Sposa, Craig Stadler, Paul Stankowski, Steve Stricker, Kevin Sutherland, Hal Sutton, Esteban Toledo, David Toms, Kirk Triplett, Bob Tway, Scott Verplank, Grant Waite, Duffy Waldorf, Brian Watts, Mike Weir, Lee Westwood, Jay Williamson, Garrett Willis, Tiger Woods, Kaname Yokoo

== Round summaries ==
=== First round ===
Thursday, March 21, 2002

Place	Player	Score	To par
1	(United States) Phil Mickelson	64	−8
2	(United States) Chris DiMarco	66	−6
3	(United States) Scott Hoch	67	−5
T4	(United States) David Duval	68	−4
T4	(England) Nick Faldo	68	−4
T6	(Australia) Robert Allenby	69	−3
T6	(Australia) Stuart Appleby	69	−3
T6	(United States) Mark Calcavecchia	69	−3
T6	(United States) Brian Gay	69	−3
T6	(United States) David Gossett	69	−3
T6	(United States) Jerry Kelly	69	−3
T6	(United States) Steve Lowery	69	−3
T6	(United States) Carl Paulson	69	−3
T6	(United States) Jeff Sluman	69	−3
T6	(United States) Steve Stricker	69	−3
T6	(United States) David Toms	69	−3

=== Second round ===
Friday, March 22, 2002
Saturday, March 23, 2002

Place	Player	Score	To par
T1	(United States) Carl Paulson	69-69=138	−6
T1	(United States) Jeff Sluman	69-69=138	−6
T3	(United States) Mark Calcavecchia	69-70=139	−5
T3	(United States) Phil Mickelson	64-75=139	−5
T3	(New Zealand) Craig Perks	71-68=139	−5
6	(New Zealand) Michael Campbell	72-68=140	−4
T7	(United States) Chris DiMarco	66-75=141	−3
T7	(England) Nick Faldo	68-73=141	−3
T7	(United States) Rocco Mediate	71-70=141	−3
T7	(United States) David Toms	69-72=141	−3

=== Third round ===
Saturday, March 23, 2002

Place	Player	Score	To par
1	(United States) Carl Paulson	69-69-69=207	−9
2	(New Zealand) Craig Perks	71-68-69=208	−8
T3	(United States) Rocco Mediate	71-70-69=210	−6
T3	(United States) Jeff Sluman	69-69-72=210	−6
T5	(United States) David Toms	69-72-70=211	−5
T5	(Canada) Mike Weir	70-73-68=211	−5
T7	(United States) Billy Andrade	73-69-70=212	−4
T7	(United States) Mark Calcavecchia	69-70-73=212	−4
T7	(United States) Scott Hoch	67-77-68=212	−4
T10	(England) Nick Faldo	68-73-72=213	−3
T10	(Spain) Sergio García	70-72-71=213	−3
T10	(United States) Steve Lowery	69-73-71=213	−3
T10	(Japan) Shigeki Maruyama	72-72-69=213	−3
T10	(United States) Tiger Woods	71-72-70=213	−3

=== Final round ===
Sunday, March 24, 2002

Craig Perks chipped in on the 16th and 18th holes to win the championship, his only PGA Tour victory. His lone putt in the last three holes was a 28-foot birdie putt on the 17th.

Champion
(c) = past champion

Place	Player	Score	To par	Money ($)
1	(New Zealand) Craig Perks	71-68-69-72=280	−8	1,080,000
2	(Trinidad and Tobago) Stephen Ames	74-69-72-67=282	−6	648,000
3	(United States) Rocco Mediate	71-70-69-73=283	−5	408,000
T4	(United States) Billy Andrade	73-69-70-72=284	−4	226,200
T4	(Spain) Sergio García	70-72-71-71=284	−4	226,200
T4	(United States) Scott Hoch	67-77-68-72=284	−4	226,200
T4	(United States) Carl Paulson	69-69-69-77=284	−4	226,200
T4	(United States) Jeff Sluman	69-69-72-74=284	−4	226,200
T9	(United States) John Huston	73-69-73-70=285	−3	168,000
T9	(Zimbabwe) Nick Price (c)	74-71-71-69=285	−3	168,000

Leaderboard below the top 10
Place	Player	Score	To par	Money ($)
T11	(Australia) Robert Allenby	69-73-72-72=286	−2	138,000
T11	(New Zealand) Michael Campbell	72-68-74-72=286	−2	138,000
T11	(United States) Jerry Kelly	69-76-74-67=286	−2	138,000
T14	(United States) Jim Furyk	71-72-71-73=287	−1	102,000
T14	(South Africa) Retief Goosen	71-71-72-73=287	−1	102,000
T14	(United States) Jeff Maggert	72-72-71-72=287	−1	102,000
T14	(Japan) Shigeki Maruyama	72-72-69-74=287	−1	102,000
T14	(United States) Tiger Woods (c)	71-72-70-74=287	−1	102,000
T19	(United States) Steve Stricker	69-74-71-74=288	E	78,000
T19	(United States) David Toms	69-72-70-77=288	E	78,000
T19	(Canada) Mike Weir	70-73-68-77=288	E	78,000
T22	(Denmark) Thomas Bjørn	74-72-75-68=289	+1	55,700
T22	(Paraguay) Carlos Franco	75-69-72-73=289	+1	55,700
T22	(Republic of Ireland) Pádraig Harrington	70-72-77-70=289	+1	55,700
T22	(Germany) Bernhard Langer	75-71-72-71=289	+1	55,700
T22	(United States) Steve Lowery	69-73-71-76=289	+1	55,700
T22	(United States) Chris Riley	71-74-74-70=289	+1	55,700
T28	(Australia) Stuart Appleby	69-74-75-72=290	+2	38,212
T28	(South Korea) K. J. Choi	71-75-73-71=290	+2	38,212
T28	(United States) David Duval (c)	68-75-72-75=290	+2	38,212
T28	(United States) Tim Herron	71-73-74-72=290	+2	38,212
T28	(United States) Tom Lehman	73-71-74-72=290	+2	38,212
T28	(United States) Phil Mickelson	64-75-75-76=290	+2	38,212
T28	(United States) Bob Tway	74-68-77-71=290	+2	38,212
T28	(United States) Scott Verplank	71-75-73-71=290	+2	38,212
T36	(Argentina) Ángel Cabrera	71-72-73-75=291	+3	26,437
T36	(United States) Glen Day	71-75-73-72=291	+3	26,437
T36	(United States) Chris DiMarco	66-75-74-76=291	+3	26,437
T36	(United States) Brad Faxon	71-73-74-73=291	+3	26,437
T36	(United States) Tom Kite (c)	72-71-79-69=291	+3	26,437
T36	(United States) Bob May	73-70-73-75=291	+3	26,437
T36	(Spain) José María Olazábal	73-73-71-74=291	+3	26,437
T36	(United States) Craig Stadler	71-72-72-76=291	+3	26,437
T44	(United States) Rich Beem	72-74-80-66=292	+4	18,648
T44	(South Africa) Ernie Els	76-69-79-68=292	+4	18,648
T44	(United States) Bob Estes	70-74-78-70=292	+4	18,648
T44	(United States) Harrison Frazar	73-71-71-77=292	+4	18,648
T44	(United States) Justin Leonard (c)	72-74-72-74=292	+4	18,648
T49	(United States) Briny Baird	71-74-74-74=293	+5	14,430
T49	(United States) Jim Carter	74-72-73-74=293	+5	14,430
T49	(United States) Brandel Chamblee	74-69-78-72=293	+5	14,430
T49	(England) Nick Faldo	68-73-72-80=293	+5	14,430
T49	(United States) Jay Haas	71-71-74-77=293	+5	14,430
T49	(United States) Dudley Hart	71-72-72-78=293	+5	14,430
T49	(United States) Frank Lickliter	76-70-73-74=293	+5	14,430
T49	(United States) Loren Roberts	72-71-73-77=293	+5	14,430
T57	(United States) Mark Brooks	72-70-74-78=294	+6	13,440
T57	(United States) Jonathan Kaye	72-72-77-73=294	+6	13,440
T57	(Australia) Craig Parry	72-73-72-77=294	+6	13,440
T60	(United States) Joel Edwards	70-72-75-78=295	+7	13,080
T60	(United States) Charles Howell III	71-74-78-72=295	+7	13,080
T60	(United States) Kenny Perry	73-71-76-75=295	+7	13,080
T63	(Australia) Steve Elkington (c)	74-68-77-77=296	+8	12,600
T63	(United States) Brian Gay	69-76-80-71=296	+8	12,600
T63	(United States) J. L. Lewis	74-70-71-81=296	+8	12,600
T63	(Scotland) Colin Montgomerie	70-76-72-78=296	+8	12,600
T63	(United States) Scott Simpson	72-72-76-76=296	+8	12,600
68	(United States) Neal Lancaster	73-71-75-78=297	+9	12,240
T69	(United States) Mark Calcavecchia	69-70-73-86=298	+10	11,940
T69	(United States) David Gossett	69-72-78-79=298	+10	11,940
T69	(United States) Len Mattiace	71-75-71-81=298	+10	11,940
T69	(United States) Tom Pernice Jr.	70-75-78-75=298	+10	11,940
73	(Mexico) Esteban Toledo	73-72-78-76=299	+11	11,640
74	(United States) Robert Damron	74-71-80-75=300	+12	11,520
75	(South Africa) David Frost	71-75-75-82=303	+15	11,400
CUT	(South Africa) Fulton Allem	73-74=147	+3	
CUT	(United States) Woody Austin	73-74=147	+3	
CUT	(United States) Stewart Cink	73-74=147	+3	
CUT	(United States) John Cook	76-71=147	+3	
CUT	(United States) John Daly	76-71=147	+3	
CUT	(United States) Joe Durant	73-74=147	+3	
CUT	(United States) Dan Forsman	73-74=147	+3	
CUT	(Japan) Shingo Katayama	72-75=147	+3	
CUT	(Canada) Ian Leggatt	74-73=147	+3	
CUT	(United States) Davis Love III (c)	73-74=147	+3	
CUT	(Republic of Ireland) Paul McGinley	75-72=147	+3	
CUT	(United States) Larry Mize	70-77=147	+3	
CUT	(United States) Mark O'Meara	74-73=147	+3	
CUT	(Fiji) Vijay Singh	76-71=147	+3	
CUT	(United States) Paul Stankowski	76-71=147	+3	
CUT	(United States) Hal Sutton (c)	73-74=147	+3	
CUT	(United States) Brian Watts	74-73=147	+3	
CUT	(United States) Olin Browne	73-75=148	+4	
CUT	(Canada) Glen Hnatiuk	76-72=148	+4	
CUT	(Sweden) Jesper Parnevik	74-74=148	+4	
CUT	(United States) David Peoples	70-78=148	+4	
CUT	(United States) Jerry Smith	70-78=148	+4	
CUT	(United States) Kevin Sutherland	79-69=148	+4	
CUT	(United States) Kirk Triplett	76-72=148	+4	
CUT	(New Zealand) Grant Waite	71-77=148	+4	
CUT	(United States) Jay Don Blake	74-75=149	+5	
CUT	(Northern Ireland) Darren Clarke	76-73=149	+5	
CUT	(United States) Fred Funk	76-73=149	+5	
CUT	(United States) Lee Janzen (c)	77-72=149	+5	
CUT	(Sweden) Per-Ulrik Johansson	72-77=149	+5	
CUT	(United States) Steve Jones	75-74=149	+5	
CUT	(United States) Greg Kraft	73-76=149	+5	
CUT	(Australia) Geoff Ogilvy	76-73=149	+5	
CUT	(United States) Duffy Waldorf	77-72=149	+5	
CUT	(United States) Jay Williamson	71-78=149	+5	
CUT	(United States) Paul Azinger	72-78=150	+6	
CUT	(United States) Scott Dunlap	78-72=150	+6	
CUT	(United States) Brent Geiberger	72-78=150	+6	
CUT	(United States) J. J. Henry	75-75=150	+6	
CUT	(United States) Billy Mayfair	76-74=150	+6	
CUT	(United States) Scott McCarron	75-75=150	+6	
CUT	(United States) Joey Sindelar	80-70=150	+6	
CUT	(England) Lee Westwood	75-75=150	+6	
CUT	(United States) Brett Quigley	73-78=151	+7	
CUT	(United States) Tom Scherrer	74-77=151	+7	
CUT	(Australia) Adam Scott	77-74=151	+7	
CUT	(United States) Notah Begay III	80-72=152	+8	
CUT	(United States) Fred Couples (c)	78-74=152	+8	
CUT	(Sweden) Niclas Fasth	76-76=152	+8	
CUT	(United States) Matt Gogel	74-78=152	+8	
CUT	(United States) J. P. Hayes	73-79=152	+8	
CUT	(Scotland) Paul Lawrie	73-79=152	+8	
CUT	(Australia) Greg Norman (c)	74-78=152	+8	
CUT	(United States) Craig Barlow	76-77=153	+9	
CUT	(Australia) Paul Gow	79-74=153	+9	
CUT	(Spain) Miguel Ángel Jiménez	72-81=153	+9	
CUT	(United States) Corey Pavin	78-75=153	+9	
CUT	(South Africa) Rory Sabbatini	77-76=153	+9	
CUT	(United States) Mike Sposa	74-79=153	+9	
CUT	(United States) Garrett Willis	76-77=153	+9	
CUT	(United States) Cameron Beckman	80-74=154	+10	
CUT	(United States) Michael Clark II	73-81=154	+10	
CUT	(United States) Steve Flesch	78-76=154	+10	
CUT	(United States) Skip Kendall	81-73=154	+10	
CUT	(United States) Dennis Paulson	77-77=154	+10	
CUT	(United States) Chris Smith	76-78=154	+10	
CUT	(Japan) Kaname Yokoo	79-75=154	+10	
CUT	(England) Ed Fryatt	79-76=155	+11	
CUT	(New Zealand) Frank Nobilo	78-77=155	+11	
CUT	(United States) Brandt Jobe	80-77=157	+13	
CUT	(Australia) Greg Chalmers	76-82=158	+14	
WD	(United States) Matt Kuchar	73	+1	
WD	(United States) David Berganio Jr.			
DQ	(United States) Michael Muehr	81	+9	

==== Scorecard ====
Final round

Hole	1	2	3	4	5	6	7	8	9	10	11	12	13	14	15	16	17	18
Par	4	5	3	4	4	4	4	3	5	4	5	4	3	4	4	5	3	4
(New Zealand) Perks	−7	−7	−7	−7	−8	−7	−8	−7	−6	−6	−7	−6	−7	−6	−5	−7	−8	−8
(Trinidad and Tobago) Ames	−1	−2	−2	−2	−3	−3	−3	−3	−4	−5	−6	−7	−6	−6	−7	−7	−7	−6
(United States) Mediate	−6	−6	−5	−5	−5	−4	−4	−4	−3	−2	−3	−4	−3	−3	−3	−5	−5	−5
(United States) Andrade	−4	−4	−4	−5	−5	−6	−6	−6	−6	−6	−6	−6	−6	−5	−5	−5	−4	−4
(Spain) García	−3	−3	−2	−2	−3	−3	−3	−3	−3	−3	−4	−4	−4	−4	−4	−5	−5	−4
(United States) Hoch	−4	−4	−4	−5	−5	−5	−5	−5	−5	−5	−5	−6	−6	−5	−5	−5	−5	−4
(United States) Paulson	−10	−10	−9	−8	−7	−6	−6	−5	−6	−6	−5	−5	−4	−4	−4	−5	−5	−4
(United States) Sluman	−6	−7	−6	−6	−6	−6	−6	−5	−5	−5	−5	−5	−6	−4	−4	−5	−5	−4
(United States) Toms	−5	−5	−5	−5	−4	−4	−3	−4	−3	−4	−3	−2	−2	−2	E	E	E	E
(Canada) Weir	−4	−5	−5	−6	−6	−6	−6	−6	−6	−5	−5	−5	−4	−3	−3	−2	E	E

Cumulative tournament scores, relative to par

Eagle	Birdie	Bogey	Double Bogey
