= Geoffrey Sisk =

American professional golfer (born 1965)

Personal information
- Full name: Geoffrey Sisk
- Nationality: United States
- Born: March 11, 1965 (age 61) Arlington, Massachusetts, U.S.
- Height: 5 ft 9 in (175 cm)
- Weight: 165 lb (75 kg)

Career
- Sport: Golf
- College: Temple University
- Turned professional: 1989
- Former tours: Nationwide Tour; PGA Tour
- Professional wins: at least 29

Best results in major championships
- Masters Tournament: DNP
- PGA Championship: DNP
- U.S. Open: T30: 1999
- The Open Championship: DNP

Geoffrey Sisk (born March 11, 1965) is an American professional golfer. Sisk had a "sterling" amateur career at Temple University, earning All-American honors and winning eight tournaments, a Temple record. He had difficulties getting on to the PGA Tour, however, with repeated failures at PGA Tour Qualifying school. In the interim, he played local events in New England with incredible success, ultimately winning the Massachusetts Open six times. Sisk finally earned PGA Tour membership before the 1999 season but was unable to maintain his card. For most of the remainder of his career, he played on the local minitours, especially the New England Pro Golf Tour, with much success, winning over a dozen tournaments.

== Early life ==
Sisk was born in Arlington, Massachusetts. He grew up in Billerica, Massachusetts. Around the age of 15, however, his family moved to Marshfield, Massachusetts. Sisk attended Marshfield High School. In his early teens, he won the Marshfield Country Club junior championship. As a sophomore at Marshfield High, he earned the top spot on his high school's golf team. He also finished in fourth place at the Massachusetts State Junior Championship. Late in the academic year, Sisk first received notable media coverage in The Boston Globe. The newspaper referred to him as part of the 1981 Golf All-Scholastics team.

In the summer of 1982, Sisk's play at the Catholic Youth Organization (CYO) Intermediate Tournament was reported by The Boston Globe. Sisk won the CYO defeating Ted Wheeler in the finals 3 & 2. During his senior year, Sisk maintained top-notch play for Marshfield High School. "He has been around par or under par all year," his coach Dennis Zicko said. Late in the academic year, Sisk played the Cape Area sectional title at Pocasset Golf Club in Bourne, Massachusetts. Sisk won the event, scoring four birdies against three bogeys, finishing with a one-under-par 71.

== Amateur career ==
In the spring of 1983, Sisk was recruited to attend Temple University on a "partial golf scholarship." It was the only college to offer him an athletic scholarship. In the fall of 1983, Sisk began attending Temple. During the academic year, he won the Big 5 Invitational, his first win college win. In March 1984, Sisk received media attention for his play at the Iron Duke Classic. At the elite event, he finished in joint second place among individuals, one shot behind champion Webb Heintzelman. In the summer he returned to Massachusetts. He was the low amateur at the Massachusetts Open. In July, Sisk played the Massachusetts Amateur. Sisk won his first four matches and was slated to play Jim McDermott, the 1980 champ, in the finals. The finals were 36 holes long. Sisk was behind for most of the match and was 2 down with two to play. With his back against the wall, Sisk hit his tee shot on the par-3 35th hole to 5 feet threatening to take it to a 36th hole. However, McDermott holed his 12-foot birdie putt to secure the match, winning 2 & 1. Though he lost, Sisk ultimately won the Massachusetts Golf Association Player of the Year. He was the youngest person ever to win the award. He continued to have success at Temple. As of November 1985, Sisk had won five college tournaments, including the ACC Tournament and two Big Five titles. During this era, Sisk was the "No. 1 man" for Temple's golf team.

In 1986, however, according to The Boston Globe, Sisk's season was only "so-so." "My game was just deteriorating," Sisk later said. "I couldn't understand it was happening to my game. It was frustrating." In June, Sisk met up with former PGA Tour pro Bruce Douglass who gave him advice. Sisk's game slowly started to improve. In September, Sisk was the individual champion at the Yale Invitational and "[l]ed" Temple to second-place finish in the team portion of the event. In October, Sisk was joint medalist at the Big 5 Invitational and Temple won the event for the fifth consecutive year. Late in the 1986–87 academic year, Sisk won the Eastern Invitational, the final tournament of the season. "For the first time in two years I really felt like I was hitting the ball," Sisk told The Boston Globe after the event. Sisk was also an All-American at Temple. In December 1987, Sisk graduated from Temple with a degree in finance. Sisk ultimately won eight tournaments for Temple, the most ever at the time. He is currently tied with Brandon Matthews for the most ever. Despite his success as an amateur, Sisk did not intend to turn professional.

In the late 1980s, Sisk continued to have success at local New England amateur events. In 1988, Sisk won the John Cronin Memorial Four-ball with partner Mark Greenhaigh. Later in the spring, he was low amateur at the Massachusetts Open again. In the summer of 1988, Sisk recorded "a grueling one-stroke victory" at the Rockland Open. A few days later he attempted to qualify for the U.S. Amateur. In final round, he shot a "spectacular" 69 to earn medalist honors and qualify for the event. Sisk ultimately qualified for the match play portion of the event. He reached the Round of 16 and received "national media attention" for his performance. In July 1989, Sisk shot a 69, the only under-par score, to earn medalist honors at the Massachusetts Amateur. The following month, he qualified for the U.S. Amateur again. During this era, Sisk was regarded as one of the top amateurs in the state by the Massachusetts Golf Association (MGA).

== Professional career ==
In late 1989, Sisk turned professional. He was originally ambivalent about turning pro but later stated "over the winter I thought about it and figured if I don't try to become a professional golfer and see how good I can be, 20 years from now I would regret it." During the winter of 1989–90 he moved to Florida to have the opportunity to practice more. He played the minitours where he finished in the money in nine of his 11 events. In June 1990, Sisk played the Massachusetts Open. He was in the joint lead after the first two rounds. On the par-3 17th hole of the final round, Sisk was one shot back and nearly holed his tee shot. He tied playing partner Fran Quinn for the lead. However, on the final hole, influenced by Quinn's good positioning, Sisk played his approach shot too aggressively and it went into a bunker. He made bogey and finished third. During the year, he started playing some events on the Ben Hogan Tour, the PGA Tour's developmental tour. He recorded a top ten at the Ben Hogan New England Classic. In November, Sisk began making attempts to qualify for the PGA Tour at the PGA Tour Qualifying Tournament. At sectionals, playing Jacaranda Country Club at Plantation, Florida, Sisk shot 284 to move on. At the final stage, Sisk failed to earn PGA Tour membership, however. During this era, Sisk started working with famed instructor Peter Kostis.

In 1991, Sisk continued playing on the Ben Hogan Tour. However he had tenuous status. Sisk said, "I am a regular Hogan Tour alternate, but unless the field fails to fill up with regular commitments, I have to try to qualify each week in order to play." Sisk made the cut in his first five events with two top-25s. In May, he stated, "The week-after-week tournaments are having a good effect. It makes you tournament tough." However, Sisk then started "struggling" on the Hogan Tour, missing several cuts in a row. "I missed five cuts; I was getting very disgusted," he told The Boston Globe. He ultimately missed seven cuts in a row. Sisk claimed that too much "tinkering" with his swing was undermining his game. In the middle of the season, Sisk had some success. In July, he began play at the Ben Hogan Wichita Charity Classic held at Reflection Ridge Golf Course in Wichita, Kansas. Sisk shot a 64 in the practice round breaking the course record. At the event proper, he shot in the 60s every day to finish one outside of the top ten. Two weeks later, at the Ben Hogan Tulsa Open, Sisk finished T-4. However, for the remainder of the year Sisk struggled, missing his last six cuts.

In the mid-1990s, Sisk did not play on the Ben Hogan Tour but rather focused on playing smaller events around New England, Florida, and South Africa. In late July 1992, he began play at the Greater Bangor Open. In the final round, Sisk recorded the day's best round, a 65, to tie Jeff Julian at the end of regulation. They entered a sudden-death playoff. Both players parred the first two holes. On the third playoff hole, played on the 7th hole, Julian made a 35-foot birdie. Sisk was unable to match him with his 15-foot putt. Sisk later said, "I just went out and tried to play a solid round of golf. I really couldn't have scored any better." Sisk earned $4,200. In the winter of 1992–93, Sisk played the Southern African Tour. At the ICL International, Sisk opened with rounds of 68 and 65 to take the lead. Nick Price outplayed him on the weekend to win but Sisk still finished in the top ten. In July, Sisk played the Greater Bangor Open at Bangor Municipal Golf Course again. In the second round, Sisk shot a 63 (−6) to tie the course record. He finished in the top ten. In December, he began playing the Gold Coast Pro Tour, a minitour in Florida. At an event at Wycliffe Country Club, Sisk finished solo runner-up. In June 1994, Sisk won the Cape Cod Open. It was "his first victory as a professional." In November, he began playing the Gold Coast Tour again. At an event in West Palm Beach, Florida, Sisk shot rounds of 70 and 72 to finish joint second. He won $1,150. In December, at an event at Emerald Dunes Golf Club in West Palm Beach, he finished in a tie for fourth, six back of champion Bob Friend. At this stage he was in the top ten on the money list for the tour. It was described that he was "hitting the ball better than he ever had." In June 1995, Sisk played a sectional qualifier for the U.S. Open at Century and Old Oaks Country Club in Purchase, New York. Sisk shot rounds of 66 and 72 to finish in joint second and qualify for the 1995 U.S. Open. It was his first U.S. Open. The week after he played the U.S. Open he played the Massachusetts Open again. The event was at Wollaston Golf Club in Milton, Massachusetts. He entered the final round one back of leader Tim Angis. During the "windy" final round, however, Angis self-destructed while Sisk executed a "careful" even-par performance to secure the victory. Sisk earned the Golfer of the Year title from Paul Harber of The Boston Globe.

For the remainder of 1995 and much of 1996, however, Sisk struggled. He did not play the Florida minitours that winter but rather decided to focus on practice in an effort to improve his game. In the spring of 1996, Sisk started playing on the Nike Tour, the PGA Tour's developmental tour, once again. However, Sisk did not have full-time exempt status. Early in the season, Sisk played in six events and made the cut in four of them with one top-25. In May, Sisk attempted to qualify for the U.S. Open. However, he shot 148 at sectionals and missed qualifying by several shots. In June, he missed the cut at the Vermont Open. He told The Boston Globe, "Honestly I've been struggling. It's frustrating." Later in the month, Sisk attempted to defend his Massachusetts Open title. However, he was not in contention, finishing ten shots back at 215 (+2).

His performance turned around significantly late in the summer. In August 1996, Sisk played the Maine Open. Sisk opened with a 67 (−5) to take a two-shot lead over Dana Quigley. In the second round, he shot a 69 to build a four shot lead. Sisk shot a final round 69 to win by four. He "never trailed in the tournament." Sisk earned $5,000. It was his first wire-to-wire win. In September 1996, he played the New England Open. Sisk opened with three-under-par rounds of 68 to take the lead. After the second round, Sisk stated, "I've been working hard and it's nice to know it's paying off and things are finally starting to click." In the final round, Sisk shot a 70 but was caught by Fran Quinn who shot a 66, the best round of the tournament. However, Sisk birdied the first playoff hole for the win. He was considered by the Valley News as "one of the hottest golfers on the regional circuit this summer." It was his third win of the season and fifth professional win of his career. In June 1997, Sisk played the Massachusetts Open again. He opened with a 69 to put him one back of the lead. In the second round, Sisk shot a 70 to maintain second place. In the final round, leader and playing partner John Elliott double bogeyed the par-5 5th hole opening doors. Sisk was in the joint lead for much of the final round. He then "took command" with a birdie on the 16th hole to take the solo lead. At the final hole, Elliot had an 8-foot putt to potentially tie. However, Sisk holed his 20-foot birdie putt to secure the win. In September 1997, he played the New England Open at Quechee Club in Quechee, Vermont. He was considered one of the favorites by the Valley News. Sisk opened with a six-under-par 64 to break the course record and take a four-stroke lead. Sisk maintained the lead for the remainder of the tournament until late. However, he three-putted the 17th hole which "opened the door." He came back with a birdie on the par-5 final hole though to secure a two shot win. Sisk earned $10,000 for the win. He intended to make his seventh attempt to qualify for the PGA Tour at PGA Tour Qualifying Tournament. Sisk played the first stage of qualifying school at Porters Neck Plantation in Wilmington, North Carolina. Sisk finished in third place and "easily advanced." Sisk's second stage was played at Hombre Country Club in Panama City, Florida. Sisk finished in a tie for 19th to advance on the number. At the six-round final stage, Sisk shot a second round 67 to move within the cut-off. However, in the final four rounds he failed to break 70 and did not advance. Though he did not earn PGA Tour status he earned a full Nike Tour card.

In 1998, Sisk played on the Nike Tour. It was his first full season on the PGA Tour's developmental tour since 1991. Through the first 14 tournaments, Sisk made the cut in eight events, including four top-25s. However, he was not happy with his results. "I don't know what's wrong with my swing," he told The Boston Globe. "I don't know if it's confidence or comfort level. I haven't been executing." During the middle of the season he played some events outside the Nike Tour. He attempted to qualify for the 1998 U.S. Open but lost a playoff in an effort to qualify. In June, he played the Massachusetts Open but recorded a "disappointing" 4th-place finish. Sisk was prepared to give up golf at this point. He was thinking about working another profession. However, according to Sisk, "for some reason I started to play better golf" shortly thereafter. In July, he finished joint fourth at the NIKE Wichita Open. Through the next ten events, Sisk made the cut in seven events and recorded two top tens. He finished 38th on the money list. By virtue of his high finish on the money list he was able to circumvent the first stage of q-school. At the second stage Sisk finished in joint 7th place to move on to the final stage. The final stage of 1998 PGA Tour Qualifying School was six rounds long. In the fifth round, Sisk scored a 65 punctuated by an eagle on the par-5 final hole. He moved to within one of the lead. Sisk shot a final round 70 to finish in fourth place and easily qualify for the PGA Tour.

In 1999, Sisk played on the PGA Tour. On January 10, Sisk flew to Hawaii to play his first event of the season, the Sony Open in Hawaii. He missed the cut. He missed the cut in his next four events. The first cut he made was in his sixth event, at the Nissan Open, where he finished in a tie for 50th. Two weeks later, at the Doral-Ryder Open, he opened with a 68 (−4) to put him one off the lead. He at least matched par for the remainder of the tournament and finished in a tie for 19th. Over the course of his next seven events, however, he missed the cut in five of them. However, he was successful in sectional qualifying for the U.S. Open, finishing two back of medalist Len Mattiace. The event proper was held at Pinehurst No. 2 in Pinehurst, North Carolina. Sisk opened well at the 1999 U.S. Open with rounds of 71 and 72 to make the cut easily. He ultimately finished in a tie for 30th. However, for the remainder of the season, Sisk struggled, making the cut in only four of his last 14 events with no top-25s. Overall for the year, Sisk only made 9 of 31 cuts. He finished 198th on the money list, well outside the threshold to maintain membership. At the end of the season he told The Boston Globe that he played excessively leading to burnout. "I should have taken more time off," Sisk said. "I played way too much. I should have listened to some people's advice, but until you experience it, you don't know what to expect."

In the early 2000s, due to his poor performances, Sisk only had conditional status on the Buy.com Tour. He was forced to qualify for week-to-week events. In 2000, he made the cut in two of his first four events with one top-ten. However, he then went on a long drought, missing the cut in seven of his next eight events. At his 13th event, the BUY.COM Carolina Classic, Sisk shot rounds of 66–69–65 to put him one back of leader Manny Zerman. However, in the final round he was recovering from the flu and it influenced his play; he finished out of contention. In August, Sisk had surgery on his right elbow to remove a "bone spur." Sisk told The Boston Globe in the middle of the year, "This season hasn't gone particularly well." Sisk returned to play the following month but did not have any success, missing the cut in his final three events. At 2000 PGA Tour Qualifying School, Sisk did not move beyond the second stage. He missed advancing by one stroke. In 2001, Sisk once again was forced to attempt to qualify for tournaments on the Buy.com Tour. In his first five attempts he was successful only once. In October, Sisk attempted to qualify for the PGA Tour again at 2001 PGA Tour Qualifying School. At the second stage, Sisk threatened to advance but shot a final round 77 and "fell short." During this era, Sisk was "contemplating quitting the sport." "I had a couple of bad years," he later said. "I lost my confidence." However, he "borrowed money from his wife" and got a job at Marshfield Country Club in an effort to sustain his career.

In the early 2000s, he played extensively on the fledging New England Pro Golf Tour (NEPGT). In early June, at his first event, he finished solo second at the Green National Open. A month later, he recorded another runner-up finish, this time at an event at Passaconaway Golf Course in Litchfield, New Hampshire. In August, he won his first event on tour, the Ledges Open played in York, Maine. Late in the month, he took the lead on the money list. In September, he finished runner-up at the Captains Open in Brewster, Massachusetts to secure the money list title before the season was over. Sisk also won the final event of the year, the Red Tail Open. In addition to his money list title he earned the New England Pro Tour Golfer of the Year title. Early in the following season, Sisk won the North Bretwood Open and Cranston Open in back-to-back weeks. He took the lead on the money list. "Things are going well," Sisk told The Boston Globe. "I can't deny I'm playing decently." In 2004, Sisk bookended the year with success. Sisk won the inaugurating Atkinson Open at 209 (−7). He defeated Eli Zackheim and Sean O'Hair by a shot. In September, he won the season-ending Samoset Open. It was his third win of the year. Sisk usurped O'Hair for the money list title. He also won the Player of Year award for the third consecutive year. Sisk did not win any tournaments on tour in 2005, though. "The whole year of not winning was difficult," Sisk said, "because in all honesty, the past four years I'm accustomed to winning." In 2006, however, he won the season-opening Vermont National Open, going wire-to-wire. In July, Sisk won the Blackstone Open at 202 (−14). He won $4,082.50 for the victory. It helped him take the lead on the money list. Shortly thereafter, Sisk won the Wintonbury Hills Open, defeating Andrew Svoboda on the 11th playoff hole. It was the longest sudden-death playoff in the history of the tour. The following week, Sisk won again, at an event at Atkinson Country Club in Atkinson, New Hampshire. It was his fourth win of the year, a tour record. Days later, Sisk would win another tour event, the New England Open, at 199 (–17), defeating Brett Melton by four strokes. He would go on to win the money list and Player of the Year for the fourth time. Sisk was referred to by the Hartford Courant as "the Tiger Woods of the New England Pro Golf Tour."

In 2007, Sisk had success at a number of events across the country. In June, Sisk played a sectional qualifier for the 2007 U.S. Open held at Century Country Club in Purchase, New York. He was co-medalist at the event. This qualified him for the tournament proper held at Oakmont Country Club in Oakmont, Pennsylvania. Later in June, Sisk played the Massachusetts Open hosted by Kernwood County Club in Salem, Massachusetts. He was considered one of the favorites. In the second round, Sisk shot a 64 to tie the course record and take the lead. In the final round, Sisk "methodically dissected" the course, shooting a two-under-par 68, to win by four. It was his sixth win at the event. He tied Alex Ross for the most Massachusetts Open wins ever. In September, Sisk played the New England Open at Lake Winnipesaukee Golf Club in Lake Winnipesaukee, New Hampshire. With a final round 65, he secured an eight shot win. Sisk also had much success on the local North American Pro Golf Tour (NAPGT), winning three times. Due to his success, he led the money list and won the Player of the Year award for the second straight year. Late in the year, Sisk attempted to qualify for the PGA Tour again. At the first stage, played at Florence, South Carolina, Sisk finished second and moved on. It qualified him for the six-round final stage held at Winter Garden, Florida. Sisk played well, shooting under-par for each of the first five rounds and put himself well within the top 25 cut-off. Sisk "faltered" in the final round with a 77 (+5) but became fully exempt on the Nationwide Tour.

Sisk played on the Nationwide Tour for the next few years. In 2008, Sisk played in 24 events, making the cut in 13 of them. He recorded six top-25s, including one top ten. He finished 86th on the money list. Sisk played the finals of 2008 PGA Tour Qualifying School in an effort to return to the PGA Tour. However, his "hopes were dashed" with a fifth round 77 (+5). He was able "to improve his Nationwide Tour status" with his 40th-place finish though. In 2009, Sisk made the cut in three of his first four events, with one top-25. His fifth event was the Chitimacha Louisiana Open. Sisk recorded a joint third-place finish, "his best showing on tour." He missed the cut at his next three events but then recorded a top ten at the BMW Charity Pro-Am. As of June, he was inside the top 25 threshold to automatically move on to the PGA Tour. Over the remainder of the season, however, Sisk failed to record any top tens and fell outside the threshold. In 2010, Sisk opened the season poorly, missing the cut in seven of his first 11 events. In the middle of the season, however, Sisk had much success. At the Chiquita Classic, Sisk shot in the 60s every day to finish joint third. Weeks later, at the Mylan Classic. Sisk opened with birdies on six of the first seven holes on his way to a six-under-par 65 and the joint lead. "Everything was great how I played today," he said. "There's not a shot I would have hit any differently all day." Sisk followed with rounds of 67 and 69 to take a two-stroke lead over Steve Wheatcroft and a three stroke lead over Kevin Kisner. In the final round, Sisk held a one-stroke lead entering the par-4 17th hole. However, he hit his approach into a bunker. He made double bogey and lost by one to Kisner. Late in the season, he recorded another top five at the Winn-Dixie Jacksonville Open. These high results helped him finish 50th on the money list. At 2010 PGA Tour Qualifying School, Sisk did not play well, however, finishing 16 strokes behind the cut-off. He was "conditionally exempt" on the Nationwide Tour for the following year though. In 2011, Sisk played on the Nationwide Tour once more. Sisk made the cut in only four of his first eight events with no top-25s. Sisk told The Boston Globe in the middle of the season, "I've worked hard on my game and played extremely well this year, some of the best golf I've ever played," he said. "I just haven't got a lot out of my game." Over the remaining 14 events on tour, Sisk did not do anything notable, again missing the cut in half of his events and failing to record any top-25s. Sisk "lost his card" on tour.

In 2013, Sisk attempted to qualify for the U.S. Open again. Sisk's local qualifying was held at Pinehills Golf Club. Sisk was successful shooting a 68. Sectional qualifying was held at Purchase, New York. He "punche[d] his seventh ticket" to the tournament with rounds of 67 and 69 to earn joint medalist honors. It was also the sixth time Sisk had earned entry in the event through both local and sectional qualifying. Sisk earned much media attention for this achievement. Doug Ferguson of the Associated Press wrote a profile of Sisk. It was widely published across the country. Michael Whitmer of The Boston Globe wrote a full-length article about Sisk in preparation for the 2013 U.S. Open. Joe Juliano of The Philadelphia Inquirer also wrote a full-length profile of Sisk. Due to his success at getting into the U.S. Open, he was later referred to by The Times and Democrat as "the master of USGA qualifiers."

Late in his regular career, Sisk had much success at local events in New England, recording a number of first- and second-place finishes. In late July 2013, he played the New Hampshire Open. Sisk opened with a seven-under-par 65 to take the solo lead. He ultimately finished in a tie for second place. Days later, Sisk began play at the Maine Open. He was considered "[a]rguably the most accomplished player in the field." Sisk again finished joint second. He earned $6,250. The following week, Sisk once more finished in joint second, this time at the Manchester Open. In September, he finished solo second at the New England Open. In late July 2014, Sisk began play at the New Hampshire Open. Sisk opened with a 67 (−5) but was well behind leader Chris Wellde. However, during the 36-hole finale, he shot rounds of 66 and 67 to tie David Chung at the end of regulation. Sisk then won it on the third playoff hole.

In the mid-2010s, Sisk played in a number of senior events. In November 2014, Sisk attempted to qualify for the Champions Tour at its qualifying school. Sisk finished with a 67 to finish in a tie for 14th place to earn some status and become "eligible for open qualifying." Sisk, however, was not particularly successful in getting into events. "I have been trying to get into the Champions Tour events, but have come up short in the Monday qualifiers," he told the Cape Cod Times. In late June 2015, he played a sectional qualifier for the U.S. Senior Open. He shot a 65 for medalist honors and earn entry into the event. Sisk shot rounds of 74 and 69 at the event proper to make the cut. He ultimately finished in a tie for 54th place. In December 2015, he attempted to earn membership at Champions Tour Qualifying School again. Sisk finished in a tie for 58th place, well outside the threshold to move on. In 2016, Sisk qualified for the U.S. Senior Open again. He missed the cut. In May 2017, he attempted to qualify for the event again. However, in the qualifying rounds he lost a playoff to Chip Johnson. In November, he entered Champions Tour qualifying school once more. He shot under-par each day and finished near the top ten. However, he was five shots out of the top five threshold to earn membership. In 2020, he played in his final Champions Tour event.

== Personal life ==
As of 1997, Sisk was married to Denise, an attorney. As of August 2001, they had two daughters.

== Awards and honors ==
- In 1984, Sisk won the Massachusetts Golf Association Player of the Year
- Sisk was a three-time honorable mention All-American at Temple University
- From 2002 to 2004 and in 2006, he won the Player of Year award on New England Pro Golf Tour
- In 2006 and 2007, he won the Player of the Year award on the North American Pro Golf Tour

== Amateur wins ==
- 1983 Big 5 Invitational
- 1985 Big 5 Invitational, Atlantic 10 Champion
- 1986 Eastern Invitational, Navy Invitational, Big 5 Invitational, Yale Invitational, Atlantic 10 Champion

== Professional wins ==
=== New England Pro Golf Tour wins ===
note: this list is incomplete

- 2002 Ledges Open, Red Tail Open
- 2003 North Bretwood Open, Cranston Open, Goffstown Open
- 2004 Atkinson Open, Samonset Open
- 2006 Vermont National Open, Wintonbury Hills Open, Atkinson Open, New England Open

=== North American Golf Tour wins ===
note: this list is incomplete

- 2007 Atlantic Open

=== Other wins (17) ===
- 1988 Rockland Open (as an amateur)
- 1994 Cape Cod Open
- 1995 Massachusetts Open
- 1996 Maine Open, New England Open
- 1997 Massachusetts Open, New England Open
- 2002 Massachusetts Open
- 2004 Cape Cod Open, Massachusetts Open
- 2006 Massachusetts Open
- 2007 Massachusetts Open, New England Open
- 2012 Cape Cod Open
- 2013 Cape Cod Open
- 2014 New Hampshire Open
- 2015 Cape Cod Open

== Results in major championships ==
Tournament	1995	1996	1997	1998	1999	2000	2001	2002	2003	2004
U.S. Open	CUT				T30				CUT	T40

Tournament	2005	2006	2007	2008	2009	2010	2011	2012	2013
U.S. Open			CUT				CUT		CUT

== Results in senior major championships ==
Tournament	2015	2016
U.S. Senior Open	T54	CUT

== See also ==
- 1998 PGA Tour Qualifying School graduates
