= New Hampshire Open =

The New Hampshire Open is the New Hampshire state open golf tournament, open to both amateur and professional golfers. It is organized by the New Hampshire Golf Association. It has been played annually since 1932 at a variety of courses around the state.

== Winners ==
Year	Winner	Score	To par	Margin of victory	Runner(s)-up	Venue	Ref.
2026	David Pastore	132	−10	Playoff	Jason Thresher	Nashua Country Club	
2025	Jason Thresher	203	−13	1 stroke	Chris Fosdick; Harrison Shih	Bretwood Golf Club	
2024	Jason Thresher	198	−15	1 stroke	Daniel O'Rourke	Montcalm Golf Club	
2023	Lachy Barker	200				Bretwood Golf Club	
2022	Ben Reichert	199				Breakfast Hill Golf Course	
2021	Christopher Crawford	206				Manchester Country Club	
2020	No tournament due to COVID-19 pandemic						
2019	Michael Kartrude	206				Bretwood Golf Club and Keene Country Club	
2018	Jason Thresher	201				Stonebridge Country Club	
2017	David Pastore	202				Manchester Country Club	
2016	Chris DeForest	206				Owl's Nest Golf Club	
2015	Grayson Murray	198				Owl's Nest Golf Club	
2014	Geoffrey Sisk	200	−16	Playoff	David Chung	Owl's Nest Golf Club	
2013	Jesse Larson	133	−11	4 strokes	Geoffrey Sisk; Jimmy Lytle	Stonebridge Country Club	
2012	Dan McCarthy	206				Atkinson Resort & Country Club	
2011	George Zolotas	209				Atkinson Resort & Country Club	
2010	Scott Hawley	139				Atkinson Resort & Country Club	
2009	Rob Oppenheim	138				Atkinson Resort & Country Club	
2008	Michael Welch	128				North Conway Country Club	
2007	Rich Parker	134				North Conway Country Club	
2006	Mark Baldwin	132				Bretwood Golf Club	
2005	Rob Oppenheim	129				North Conway Country Club	
2004	Terry Hatch	136				Bretwood Golf Club	
2003	George Bradford	133				North Conway Country Club	
2002	Michael Hyland	137				Bretwood Golf Club	
2001	Shannon Sykora	140				Bretwood Golf Club	
2000	Mike Meehan	138				Bretwood Golf Club	
1999	Michael Adamson	136				Bretwood Golf Club	
1998	John Connelly	137				Bretwood Golf Club	
1997	Fran Quinn	139				Bretwood Golf Club	
1996	Hugh O'Neil	139				Bretwood Golf Club	
1995	Michael Muehr	133				Bretwood Golf Club	
1994	Kevin Giancola	138				Bretwood Golf Club	
1993	Joseph Cioe	138				Bretwood Golf Club	
1992	Joseph Cioe	142				Bretwood Golf Club	
1991	John Connelly	137				Bretwood Golf Club	
1990	Jeff Lewis	141				Bretwood Golf Club	
1989	Andy Morse	139				Country Club of New Hampshire	
1988	Richard Parker	133				North Conway Country Club	
1987	Richard Parker	138				North Conway Country Club	
1986	Steve Jurgensen	138				North Conway Country Club	
1985	Eddie Kirby	137				North Conway Country Club	
1984	Tony Farmer	138				North Conway Country Club	
1983	Frank Fuhrer III	139		1 stroke	Pat Shaw (a); Brian Clear; Rick Hartmann; Dudley Logan	North Conway Country Club	
1982	Kirk Hanefeld	136				North Conway Country Club	
1981	Don Robertson	139				Bretwood Golf Club	
1980	George Lucas (a)	137				Mount Washington Hotel	
1979	Curt Madson	138				Mount Washington Hotel	
1978	Charles Smith	136				Mount Washington Hotel	
1977	Paul Barkhouse	137				Mount Washington Hotel	
1976	Ron Smith Jr.	142				Charmingfare	
1975	Bryan Abbott	138				Keene Country Club	
1974	Joseph F. Carr	133				Waumbek Country Club	
1973	Wayne Levi	140				Rochester Country Club	
1972	Charles Volpone	141				Portsmouth Country Club	
1971	Dick Stranahan	139				Keene Country Club	
1970	Cotton Dunn	143				Portsmouth Country Club	
1969	Paul Barkhouse	141				Manchester Country Club	
1968	Jim Browning	140				Portsmouth Country Club	
1967	Bruce Dobie	137				Keene Country Club	
1966	Burt Page (a)	139				Nashua Country Club	
1965	Jim Browning	141				Portsmouth Country Club	
1964	Jay Dolan	140				Manchester Country Club	
1963	Bob Crowley	139				Keene Country Club	
1962	Jim O'Leary	139				Portsmouth Country Club	
1961	Jim Browning	140				Portsmouth Country Club	
1960	Bill Ezinicki	136				Nashua Country Club	
1959	Bobby Locke	137				Manchester Country Club	
1958	Bill Ezinicki	137				Nashua Country Club	
1957	Bob Crowley	136				Keene Country Club	
1956	Jim Browning	139				Derryfield Country Club	
1955	Les Kennedy	137				Laconia Country Club	
1954	Phil Friel	142				Manchester Country Club	
1953	Tex McReynolds	140				Manchester Country Club	
1952	John Kent	144				Lake Sunapee Country Club	
1951	Don Hoenig (a)	141				Nashua Country Club	
1950	Jim Browning	138				Portsmouth Country Club	
1949	John Thoren	139				Bald Peak Colony Club	
1948	John Thoren	138				Laconia Country Club	
1947	Tom Leonard, Jr. (a)	139				Manchester Country Club	
1946	Harry Nettlebladt	136				Nashua Country Club	
1945	No tournament due to World War II						
1944	No tournament due to World War II						
1943	No tournament due to World War II						
1942	No tournament due to World War II						
1941	Tony Manero	140				Manchester Country Club	
1940	Ben Yasko	137				Hanover Country Club	
1939	Tony Manero	143				Manchester Country Club	
1939	John Thoren	143				Manchester Country Club	
1938	Frank Walsh	140				Hanover Country Club	
1937	Tony Manero	133				Laconia Country Club	
1936	Harry Nettlebladt	136				Nashua Country Club	
1935	Dave Hackney	141				Manchester Country Club	
1934	A. Guay	142				Laconia Country Club	
1934	Dave Hackney	142				Laconia Country Club	
1933	Jack Curley	138				Nashua Country Club	
1932	Gene Mosher	149				Lake Sunapee Country Club	
1931	Dave Hackney	142					
1930	Tony Manero	143					
