= Jeff Julian =

Jeff Julian may refer to:

- Jeff Julian (runner) (1935–2026), New Zealand marathon runner
- Jeff Julian (golfer) (1961–2004), American golfer
