= Dicky Pride =

American professional golfer (born 1969)

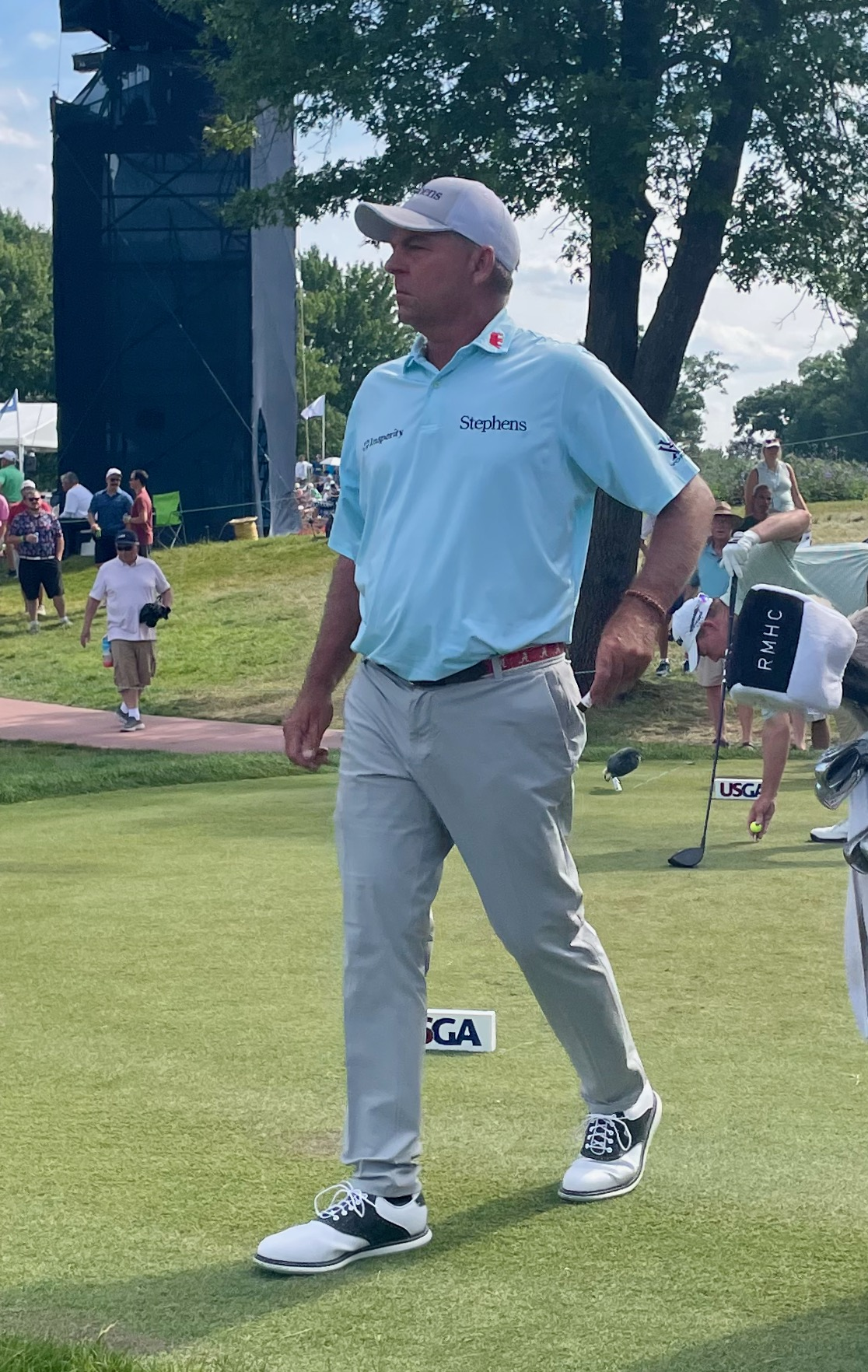
- Pride at the 2023 U.S. Senior Open

Personal information
- Full name: Richard Fletcher Pride III
- Nationality: United States
- Born: July 15, 1969 (age 57) Tuscaloosa, Alabama, U.S.
- Height: 6 ft 0 in (1.83 m)
- Weight: 175 lb (79 kg; 12.5 st)
- Spouse: Kim
- Children: 2

Career
- Sport: Golf
- College: University of Alabama
- Turned professional: 1992
- Current tour: PGA Tour Champions
- Former tours: PGA Tour; Korn Ferry Tour
- Professional wins: 4

Number of wins by tour
- PGA Tour: 1
- Korn Ferry Tour: 1
- PGA Tour Champions: 2

Best results in major championships
- Masters Tournament: CUT: 1995
- PGA Championship: T73: 1994
- U.S. Open: T28: 2003
- The Open Championship: DNP

Richard Fletcher Pride III (born July 15, 1969) is an American professional golfer who plays on the PGA Tour Champions. He previously played on the PGA Tour and the Korn Ferry Tour.

== Early life and amateur career ==
Pride was born in Tuscaloosa, Alabama. He attended Tuscaloosa Academy and the University of Alabama, where he was a member of the golf team. Pride was named All-Southeastern Conference his junior and senior years. At Alabama, he was a member of Delta Kappa Epsilon fraternity. He was a semifinalist at the 1991 U.S. Amateur. He turned professional in 1992 and played in that season's U.S. Open, where he missed the cut.

== Professional career ==
Pride became a full-time PGA Tour member after his finish at the 1993 qualifying school. Pride earned his only win to date at the 1994 Federal Express St. Jude Classic, his 19th PGA Tour start. He won that event with a birdie on the first extra hole of a playoff against Hal Sutton and Gene Sauers. His best finish in a major was a tie for 28th at the 2003 U.S. Open.

Pride developed severe health problems in 2002 (gall bladder, pancreatitis, plantar fasciitis, broken bones) which severely limited his playing time. For the next decade, he split his playing time between the PGA Tour and the Nationwide Tour. He lives in Orlando, Florida, but remains an avid Crimson Tide fan.

In 2011, Pride was actively fund-raising for Alabama natives affected by the tornado that hit his hometown of Tuscaloosa. Playing in the past champion category (which is near the bottom of the PGA Tour exemption priority list), Pride started his 2012 season with two consecutive top-ten finishes, a T-5 at the Mayakoba Golf Classic and T7 at the Honda Classic. Pride had his best finish since his only PGA Tour win at the 2012 HP Byron Nelson Championship, finishing second to Jason Dufner. He was tied for the lead on the 72nd hole, but hit his tee shot into the water hazard on the left, but saved par with a 22-foot putt after a good approach shot. Dufner holed a 25-foot birdie putt from a similar position on the green to deny Pride his first victory in almost 18 years (a win would have established a PGA Tour record for longest time between wins, beating Robert Gamez by over two years). Overall, Pride played in 19 events, made 12 cuts, earned $1,259,712, played in three stages of the FedEx Cup, and finished 70th on the 2012 money list, earning a full Tour card for 2013 and entry into invitational tournaments reserved for the top 70 money earners. At age 43, 2013 marked the first time since 1999 that Pride was fully exempt on the PGA Tour.

Pride was unable to follow up on his 2012 season and spent much of 2014 and 2015 on the Web.com Tour. He nearly regained his PGA Tour card during the 2014 Web.com Tour Finals, but missed the cut in the last event and finished outside the Top 50. He won the last regular season event during the 2015 season, jumping from 40th to fifth on the money list for his first professional win in 21 years and earning a PGA Tour card for the 2015–16 season.

In May 2021, Pride won the Mitsubishi Electric Classic at TPC Sugarloaf near Atlanta, Georgia. This was his first win on the 50 and over PGA Tour Champions. Pride won the tournament by three strokes after Monday qualifying into the tournament.

== Professional wins (4) ==
=== PGA Tour wins (1) ===
No.	Date	Tournament	Winning score	Margin of victory	Runners-up
1	Jul 31, 1994	Federal Express St. Jude Classic	−17 (66-67-67-67=267)	Playoff	(United States) Gene Sauers, (United States) Hal Sutton

PGA Tour playoff record (1–0)

No.	Year	Tournament	Opponents	Result
1	1994	Federal Express St. Jude Classic	(United States) Gene Sauers, (United States) Hal Sutton	Won with birdie on first extra hole

=== Web.com Tour wins (1) ===
No.	Date	Tournament	Winning score	Margin of victory	Runner-up
1	Aug 30, 2015	WinCo Foods Portland Open	−20 (65-66-66-67=264)	3 strokes	(United States) Tim Herron

=== PGA Tour Champions wins (2) ===
No.	Date	Tournament	Winning score	Margin of victory	Runner(s)-up
1	May 16, 2021	Mitsubishi Electric Classic	−11 (71-67-67=205)	3 strokes	(Canada) Stephen Ames, (United States) Paul Goydos, (United States) Kirk Triplett
2	Jun 28, 2026	Dick's Open	−18 (63-70-65=198)	Playoff	(Republic of Ireland) Pádraig Harrington

PGA Tour Champions playoff record (1–1)

No.	Year	Tournament	Opponent	Result
1	2021	Ascension Charity Classic	(United States) David Toms	Lost to par on first extra hole
2	2026	Dick's Open	(Republic of Ireland) Pádraig Harrington	Won with par on first extra hole

== Results in major championships ==
Tournament	1992	1993	1994	1995	1996	1997	1998	1999
Masters Tournament				CUT				
U.S. Open	CUT							
PGA Championship			T73					

Tournament	2000	2001	2002	2003	2004	2005	2006	2007	2008	2009
Masters Tournament										
U.S. Open		CUT		T28						
PGA Championship										

Tournament	2010	2011	2012	2013	2014	2015	2016
Masters Tournament							
U.S. Open							CUT
PGA Championship							

Did not play

CUT = missed the half-way cut
"T" = tied
Note: Pride never played in The Open Championship.

== Results in The Players Championship ==
Tournament	1995	1996	1997	1998	1999
The Players Championship	T49		CUT		

Tournament	2000	2001	2002	2003	2004	2005	2006	2007	2008	2009
The Players Championship	CUT									

Tournament	2010	2011	2012	2013
The Players Championship				CUT

Did not play

"T" = Tied
CUT = missed the halfway cut

== Results in senior major championships ==
Results not in chronological order

Tournament	2019	2020	2021	2022	2023	2024	2025	2026
Senior PGA Championship		NT	T20	T43	28	CUT	CUT	T41
The Tradition		NT	13	T54	T15	T32	T38	T15
U.S. Senior Open		NT	T34	CUT	T6	CUT	T9	CUT
Senior Players Championship		T19	T25	T44	T7	T40	T59	WD
Senior British Open Championship	T46	NT	T46	T53		CUT		CUT

Top 10
Did not play

CUT = missed the halfway cut
WD = withdrew
"T" indicates a tie for a place
NT = no tournament due to COVID-19 pandemic

== See also ==
- 1993 PGA Tour Qualifying School graduates
- 1997 PGA Tour Qualifying School graduates
- 1998 PGA Tour Qualifying School graduates
- 2000 PGA Tour Qualifying School graduates
- 2006 PGA Tour Qualifying School graduates
- 2015 Web.com Tour Finals graduates
