= Jim Estes =

American professional golfer (born 1964)

Personal information
- Full name: James T. Estes
- Nationality: United States
- Born: August 12, 1964 (age 62) Washington, D.C., U.S.

Career
- Sport: Golf
- College: University of Tennessee; University of Maryland
- Turned professional: 1988
- Former tours: PGA Tour; Nike Tour; U.S. Golf Tour; Champions Tour
- Professional wins: 2

Number of wins by tour
- Korn Ferry Tour: 1
- Other: 1

Best results in major championships
- Masters Tournament: DNP
- PGA Championship: CUT: 2008
- U.S. Open: CUT: 1990, 1995, 1997, 1998
- The Open Championship: DNP

James T. Estes (born August 12, 1964) is an American professional golfer.

== Career ==
Estes was born in Washington, D.C. He played college golf at the University of Tennessee and the University of Maryland. He turned professional in 1988.

Estes played on the Nationwide Tour in 1990, 1994, 1996–97, and 1999–2000, winning the 1996 Nike Inland Empire Open. He played on the PGA Tour in 1998, where his best finish was T-16 at the Greater Greensboro Chrysler Classic.

Estes also worked as a club professional and won the 1995 PGA Club Professional Player of the Year award from the PGA of America.

Estes is Director of Golf Instruction at Olney Golf Park in Olney, Maryland. He is co-founder of the Salute Military Golf Association.

== Amateur wins ==
- 1985 Maryland Amateur

== Professional wins (2) ==
=== Nike Tour wins (1) ===
No.	Date	Tournament	Winning score	Margin of victory	Runner-up
1	Mar 3, 1996	Nike Inland Empire Open	−16 (68-68-68-68=272)	1 stroke	(United States) Rob Moss

=== U.S. Golf Tour wins (1) ===
No.	Date	Tournament	Winning score	Margin of victory	Runner-up
1	Jul 23, 1989	Pointe Royale Invitational	−18 (68-66-65-63=262)	3 strokes	(United States) Peter Persons

== Results in major championships ==
Tournament	1990	1991	1992	1993	1994	1995	1996	1997	1998	1999	2000	2001	2002	2003	2004	2005	2006	2007	2008
U.S. Open	CUT					CUT		CUT	CUT										
PGA Championship																			CUT

Did not play

CUT = missed the halfway cut
Note: Estes never played in the Masters Tournament or The Open Championship.

== See also ==
- 1997 PGA Tour Qualifying School graduates
