= Andy Morse =

American golfer (born 1958)

Personal information
- Full name: Andrew Morse
- Nationality: United States
- Born: December 29, 1958 (age 67) Boston, Massachusetts
- Height: 6 ft 0 in (1.83 m)
- Weight: 180 lb (82 kg; 13 st)

Career
- Sport: Golf
- Turned professional: 1984
- Former tours: Sunshine Tour; Nationwide Tour; NGA Hooters Tour
- Professional wins: 16

Number of wins by tour
- Korn Ferry Tour: 1
- Other: 15

Best results in major championships
- Masters Tournament: DNP
- PGA Championship: DNP
- U.S. Open: T67: 1996
- The Open Championship: DNP

Andrew Morse (born December 29, 1958) is an American professional golfer.

== Early life ==
Morse was born in Boston, Massachusetts. He grew up in Needham, Massachusetts.

== Professional career ==
In 1984, Morse turned professional. Early in his pro career, Morse won a number of state opens around New England. In the late 1980s, Morse played on the Southern Africa Tour. In the early 1990s, he played on the PGA Tour's developmental tour, the Ben Hogan Tour. In the mid-1990s, he played on the NGA Hooters Tour where he won seven events. He returned to the PGA Tour's developmental tour in the early 2000s.

== Professional wins (16) ==
=== Buy.com Tour wins (1) ===
No.	Date	Tournament	Winning score	Margin of victory	Runner-up
1	Sep 3, 2000	Buy.com Utah Classic	−19 (64-66-71-68=269)	2 strokes	(United States) John Riegger

=== NGA Hooters Tour wins (7) ===
No.	Date	Tournament	Winning score	Margin of victory	Runner(s)-up
1	Apr 16, 1995	Coca-Cola Classic	−14 (73-68-66-67=274)	1 stroke	(New Zealand) Craig Perks, (United States) Mike Swartz
2	Jun 18, 1995	Sunshine Classic	−21 (64-68-65-70=267)	1 stroke	(United States) Steven Larick
3	Apr 21, 1996	Coca-Cola Series 1	−20 (63-66-66-69=264)	3 strokes	(United States) Chris Peddicord
4	Apr 28, 1996	Coca-Cola Series 2	−14 (70-67-63-74=274)	2 strokes	(United States) Chris Winchip
5	May 5, 1996	Coca-Cola Series 3	−19 (69-69-65-66=269)	2 strokes	(United States) Kim Young
6	Jun 2, 1996	Rapport Classic	−15 (63-70-71-69=273)	5 strokes	(United States) Ty Armstrong
7	Feb 28, 1999	Hooters Classic	−11 (69-65-71-72=277)	5 strokes	(United States) Bob Heintz, (United States) Robert Russell

=== Other wins (8) ===
- 1986 Northeast Open, New England Open
- 1987 Northeast Open, New England Open
- 1989 Massachusetts Open, Maine Open, New Hampshire Open
- 1993 Massachusetts Open

== Results in major championships ==
Tournament	1996	1997	1998	1999	2000	2001	2002	2003	2004	2005	2006
U.S. Open	T67	CUT									CUT

Note: The U.S. Open was the only major Morse played.

Did not play

CUT = missed the half-way cut
"T" = tied
