= Craig Perks =

New Zealand golfer

Personal information
- Full name: Craig William Perks
- Nationality: New Zealand
- Born: 6 January 1967 (age 59) Palmerston North, New Zealand
- Height: 6 ft 2 in (1.88 m)
- Weight: 200 lb (91 kg; 14 st)

Career
- Sport: Golf
- College: Southwestern Louisiana, Oklahoma
- Turned professional: 1993
- Former tours: PGA Tour; PGA Tour of Australasia; Nike Tour; Hooters Tour
- Professional wins: 5
- Highest ranking: 61 (12 May 2002)

Number of wins by tour
- PGA Tour: 1
- Other: 4

Best results in major championships
- Masters Tournament: CUT: 2002, 2003, 2004
- PGA Championship: T29: 2002
- U.S. Open: CUT: 2002
- The Open Championship: T50: 2002

Craig William Perks (born 6 January 1967) is a professional golfer from New Zealand who won the 2002 Players Championship.

== Early life and amateur career ==
In 1967, Perks was born in Palmerston North, New Zealand. He was also raised in the town.

Perks attended university in the United States. He played college golf at the University of Oklahoma and the University of Southwestern Louisiana in Lafayette, Louisiana.

== Professional career ==
In 1993, Perks turned professional. He played on the second tier Nike Tour for several seasons. Perks became a member of the PGA Tour after a tie for 35th in the 1999 PGA Tour Qualifying School earned him his tour card for the 2000 season.

At the age of 35, in 2002, Perks unexpectedly won The Players Championship. In the final pairing, he played the final three holes in only nine shots, three under par, with only one putt. Perks chipped in for eagle, sank a 25-foot (7.5 m) birdie putt on the Island Green, then chipped in for par to win by two strokes. He was even par 72 for the final round, but only had two pars in the last fourteen holes. Starting the year at 256 in the world rankings, Perks climbed from 203 to 64 with the win, and was named the New Zealand Sportsman of the Year for 2002. It granted a five-year exemption on tour, but was his only win in 202 starts.

After making only one cut on the PGA Tour during 2006 and 2007, he announced his retirement in November 2007, and became a commentator on the Golf Channel.

== Awards and honors ==
In 2002, Perks was named the New Zealand Sportsman of the Year

== Professional wins (5) ==
=== PGA Tour wins (1) ===
Legend
Players Championships (1)
Other PGA Tour (0)

No.	Date	Tournament	Winning score	To par	Margin of victory	Runner-up
1	24 Mar 2002	The Players Championship	71-68-69-72=280	−8	2 strokes	(Trinidad and Tobago) Stephen Ames

=== Hooters Tour wins (4) ===
No.	Date	Tournament	Winning score	To par	Margin of victory	Runner-up
1	4 Jul 1993	Croatan National Classic	66-67-71-71=275	−13	2 strokes	(United States) Mike Brisky
2	8 Aug 1993	Collins Pro Classic	73-68-67-71=279	−9	1 stroke	(United States) Jeff Barlow
3	18 Sep 1994	Boast Classic	66-69-68=203 (Note: Shortened to 54 holes due to weather.)	−13	3 strokes	(United States) Andy Morse
4	30 Apr 1995	Coca-Cola Classic	64-65-69-62=260	−24	2 strokes	(United States) Dennis Zinkon

== Playoff record ==
PGA Tour of Australasia playoff record (0–1)

No.	Year	Tournament	Opponent	Result
1	2000	Crown Lager New Zealand Open	(New Zealand) Michael Campbell	Lost to eagle on second extra hole

Nike Tour playoff record (0–1)

No.	Year	Tournament	Opponent	Result
1	1996	Nike Carolina Classic	(Canada) Glen Hnatiuk	Lost to birdie on first extra hole

== Results in major championships ==
Tournament	2002	2003	2004
Masters Tournament	CUT	CUT	CUT
U.S. Open	CUT		
The Open Championship	T50	CUT	CUT
PGA Championship	T29		

Did not play

CUT = missed the half-way cut
"T" = tied

== The Players Championship ==
=== Wins (1) ===
Year	Championship	54 holes	Winning score	Margin	Runner-up
2002	The Players Championship	1 shot deficit	−8 (71-68-69-72=280)	2 strokes	(Trinidad and Tobago) Stephen Ames

=== Results timeline ===
Tournament	2002	2003	2004	2005	2006	2007
The Players Championship	1	T17	CUT	CUT	CUT	CUT

Win

CUT = missed the halfway cut
"T" indicates a tie for a place.

== Results in World Golf Championships ==
Tournament	2002
Match Play	
Championship	61
Invitational	T42

Did not play

"T" = Tied

== Team appearances ==
- World Cup (representing New Zealand): 2002, 2004

== See also ==
- 1999 PGA Tour Qualifying School graduates
- 2000 PGA Tour Qualifying School graduates

== Notes ==
Awards
Preceded by Cameron Brown	New Zealand's Sportsman of the Year; 2002	Succeeded by Ben Fouhy
