= 1998 PGA Tour Qualifying School graduates =

This is a list of the 41 players who earned 1999 PGA Tour cards through the PGA Tour Qualifying Tournament in 1998.

Place	Player	PGA Tour starts	Cuts made	Notes
1	(Canada) Mike Weir	43	17	
T2	(South Africa) Deane Pappas	6	1	
T2	(United States) Jonathan Kaye	51	22	
T4	(United States) Geoffrey Sisk	3	0	
T4	(United States) Dave Stockton Jr.	151	73	2 Nike Tour wins
T4	(United States) Pete Jordan	144	67	
T4	(Australia) Greg Chalmers	2	1	2 PGA Tour of Australasia wins; 1 Challenge Tour win
T8	(United States) Rich Beem	0	0	
T8	(United States) Cameron Beckman	3	1	
T8	(United States) Mike Brisky	133	67	1 Nike Tour win
11	(United States) Brent Schwarzrock	0	0	
T12	(United States) P. H. Horgan III	216	94	3 Nike Tour wins
T12	(United States) Briny Baird	0	0	
T14	(United States) John Elliott	77	26	2 Nike Tour wins
T14	(United States) Ted Purdy	1	0	
T14	(United States) Rick Fehr	340	212	2 PGA Tour wins
T17	(United States) Alan Bratton	4	0	
T17	(United States) Bo Van Pelt	0	0	
T17	(United States) Charles Warren	0	0	
T17	(Australia) Robert Allenby	40	19	4 European Tour wins; 6 PGA Tour of Australasia wins
T17	(United States) Craig Barlow	30	13	
T17	(United States) Chris Couch	1	0	
T23	(Japan) Katsumasa Miyamoto	1	1	2 Japan Golf Tour wins
T23	(United States) Jeff Brehaut	0	0	2 Nike Tour wins
T23	(United States) Ty Armstrong	24	8	
T26	(United States) Chris Riley	2	0	
T26	(United States) Steve Jurgensen	67	28	1 Nike Tour win
T26	(United States) Jay Williamson	51	25	
T26	(United States) Jay Delsing	403	206	
T26	(United States) Chris Smith	72	36	5 Nike Tour wins
T31	(United States) Danny Briggs	71	27	
T31	(United States) Dicky Pride	144	49	1 PGA Tour win
T31	(United States) David Seawell	0	0	
T31	(United States) Brian Gay	1	0	
T35	(United States) Kent Jones	31	18	
T35	(South Africa) Rory Sabbatini	0	0	
T35	(Paraguay) Carlos Franco	5	4	5 Japan Golf Tour wins
T35	(United States) Clarence Rose	437	232	1 PGA Tour win
T35	(United States) Scott Dunlap	64	30	
T35	(United States) Perry Moss	30	16	1 Nike Tour win
T35	(United States) Tim Loustalot	48	17	2 Nike Tour wins

PGA Tour rookie in 1999

== 1999 Results ==
Player	Starts	Cuts made	Best finish	Money list rank	Earnings ($)
(Canada) Mike Weir	30	20	Win	23	1,491,139
(South Africa) Deane Pappas*	29	11	T12	189	113,380
(United States) Jonathan Kaye	32	24	2	49	845,051
(United States) Geoffrey Sisk*	31	9	T19	198	91,260
(United States) Dave Stockton Jr.	32	13	T6	153	197,127
(United States) Pete Jordan	30	14	T5	135	295,419
(Australia) Greg Chalmers*	34	20	T10	114	362,635
(United States) Rich Beem*	24	9	Win	67	610,555
(United States) Cameron Beckman*	28	12	T13	172	147,036
(United States) Mike Brisky	25	13	2	115	361,084
(United States) Brent Schwarzrock*	1	0	WD	n/a	0
(United States) P. H. Horgan III	31	20	T8	142	265,956
(United States) Briny Baird*	28	12	T28	186	115,357
(United States) John Elliott	28	11	T20	182	120,083
(United States) Ted Purdy*	27	8	T35	230	46,660
(United States) Rick Fehr	26	12	T6	140	275,865
(United States) Alan Bratton*	31	6	T15	201	80,998
(United States) Bo Van Pelt*	28	7	T20	210	70,080
(United States) Charles Warren*	26	8	T24	213	67,784
(Australia) Robert Allenby*	27	17	T11	126	321,507
(United States) Craig Barlow	28	16	T3	124	327,393
(United States) Chris Couch*	30	6	T7	181	121,752
(Japan) Katsumasa Miyamoto*	22	8	T11	170	154,402
(United States) Jeff Brehaut*	28	12	T8	180	126,353
(United States) Ty Armstrong	28	10	T34	199	85,783
(United States) Chris Riley*	28	15	T7	112	367,805
(United States) Steve Jurgensen	23	4	T33	245	28,136
(United States) Jay Williamson	32	12	T4	144	263,618
(United States) Jay Delsing	27	11	T3	91	431,879
(United States) Chris Smith	28	11	T20	184	116,794
(United States) Danny Briggs	24	15	T8	161	182,245
(United States) Dicky Pride	29	14	5	109	381,040
(United States) David Seawell*	23	2	72	295	9,550
(United States) Brian Gay*	26	8	T24	206	74,329
(United States) Kent Jones	26	7	T19	218	64,217
(South Africa) Rory Sabbatini*	27	13	3	108	381,322
(Paraguay) Carlos Franco*	22	15	Win (x2)	11	1,864,584
(United States) Clarence Rose	22	4	T27	234	36,451
(United States) Scott Dunlap	24	19	T3	78	533,027
(United States) Perry Moss	22	14	T3	149	238,986
(United States) Tim Loustalot	26	7	T18	214	67,679

*PGA Tour rookie in 1999
T = Tied
The player retained his PGA Tour card for 2000 (finished inside the top 125, excluding non-members)
The player did not retain his PGA Tour card for 2000, but retained conditional status (finished between 126 and 150, excluding non-members)
The player did not retain his PGA Tour card for 2000 (finished outside the top 150)

== Winners on the PGA Tour in 1999 ==
No.	Date	Player	Tournament	Winning score	Margin of victory	Runner-up
1	May 9	(Paraguay) Carlos Franco	Compaq Classic of New Orleans	−19 (66-69-68-66=269)	2 strokes	(United States) Steve Flesch (United States) Harrison Frazar
2	May 30	(United States) Rich Beem	Kemper Open	−10 (66-67-71-70=274)	2 strokes	(United States) Bill Glasson (Australia) Bradley Hughes
3	Jul 11	(Paraguay) Carlos Franco (2)	Greater Milwaukee Open	−20 (65-66-67-66=264)	2 strokes	(United States) Tom Lehman
4	Sep 5	(Canada) Mike Weir	Air Canada Championship	−18 (68-70-64-64=266)	2 strokes	(United States) Fred Funk

== Runners-up on the PGA Tour in 1999 ==
No.	Date	Player	Tournament	Winner	Winning score	Runner-up score
1	Jul 4	(Canada) Mike Weir	Motorola Western Open	(United States) Tiger Woods	−15 (68-66-68-71=273)	−12 (72-67-67-70=276)
2	Jul 25	(United States) Mike Brisky; Lost in playoff	John Deere Classic	(United States) J. L. Lewis	−19 (66-65-65-65=261)	−19 (66-62-68-65=261)
3	Oct 17	(United States) Jonathan Kaye	Las Vegas Invitational	(United States) Jim Furyk	−29 (67-64-63-71-66=331)	−28 (63-66-66-73-64=332)

== See also ==
- 1998 Nike Tour graduates
