= Bradley Iles =

New Zealand golfer (born 1983)

Personal information
- Nationality: New Zealand
- Born: 23 August 1983 (age 43) Murupara, New Zealand
- Height: 6 ft 2 in (1.88 m)
- Weight: 190 lb (86 kg; 14 st)

Career
- Sport: Golf
- Turned professional: 2005
- Current tours: Nationwide Tour; PGA Tour of Australasia
- Professional wins: 1

Bradley Iles (born 23 August 1983) is a professional golfer from New Zealand who currently plays on the Nationwide Tour.

== Early life ==
Iles was born in Murupara, New Zealand. At the age of 10, Iles got started with the game of golf due to his mother's influence.

== Professional career ==
In 2005, Iles turned professional. Iles has never won on the Nationwide Tour, but has come close, losing in a two-hole playoff at the Knoxville Open to Kevin Johnson.

In about 2006, U.S. Open Champion and fellow New Zealander Michael Campbell called Iles the "best talent to come out of New Zealand in a long time."

== Personal life ==
In July 2004, Iles suffered a brain injury, which sent him into a three-day coma.

== Professional wins (1) ==
=== Golf Tour of New Zealand wins (1) ===
No.	Date	Tournament	Winning score	Margin of victory	Runner-up
1	30 Sep 2007	Bayleys Taranaki Open	−3 (74-68-71=213) (Note: Shortened to 54 holes due to weather.)	4 strokes	(New Zealand) Mark Brown

== Playoff record ==
Nationwide Tour playoff record (0–1)

No.	Year	Tournament	Opponent	Result
1	2009	Knoxville Open	(United States) Kevin Johnson	Lost to birdie on second extra hole

== Team appearances ==
Amateur

- Nomura Cup (representing New Zealand): 2003, 2005
- Bonallack Trophy (representing Asia/Pacific): 2004 (winners)
