= Steve Jurgensen =

American professional golfer (born 1961)

Personal information
- Nationality: United States
- Born: October 27, 1961 (age 65) San Jose, California, U.S.
- Height: 5 ft 10 in (1.78 m)
- Weight: 160 lb (73 kg; 11 st)

Career
- Sport: Golf
- College: University of Houston
- Turned professional: 1985
- Former tours: PGA Tour; Nationwide Tour
- Professional wins: 23

Number of wins by tour
- Korn Ferry Tour: 1
- Other: 22

Best results in major championships
- Masters Tournament: DNP
- PGA Championship: DNP
- U.S. Open: CUT: 1996
- The Open Championship: DNP

Steve Jurgensen (born October 27, 1961) is an American professional golfer.

== Early life and amateur career ==
Jurgensen was born in San Jose, California. He played NCAA Division I golf at the University of Houston.

== Professional career ==
In 1985, Jurgensen turned professional. He played on the Nike Tour in the mid-1990s, accruing ten top 10 finishes including a win at the 1993 Nike Tri-Cities Open.

Jurgensen played on the PGA Tour in 1996, 1997, 1998, and 1999. He had four top 10 finishes, with a top finish of T-4 at the 1997 Deposit Guaranty Golf Classic. After turning 50, Jurgensen has played in three events on the PGA Tour Champions. Jurgensen's professional career (ongoing) has included 22 tournament wins across all tours, the majority based out of the Southern Texas section of the PGA of America.

== Professional wins (23) ==
=== Nike Tour wins (1) ===
No.	Date	Tournament	Winning score	Margin of victory	Runner-up
1	Sep 12, 1993	Nike Tri-Cities Open	−9 (67-73-67=207)	1 stroke	(United States) Stan Utley

Nike Tour playoff record (0–1)

No.	Year	Tournament	Opponents	Result
1	1997	Nike Puget Sound Open	(United States) Michael Clark II, (United States) Kevin Johnson	Johnson won with birdie on second extra hole

=== Other wins (4) ===
- 1986 New Hampshire Open
- 1987 Massachusetts Open
- 1991 Long Beach Open
- 2022 Southern Texas PGA Championship

=== Senior wins (18) ===
- 2015 STPGA Senior Series - Sonterra, STPGA Senior Tour Championship
- 2018 STPGA Senior Series - River Place
- 2020 STPGA Senior Series - Horseshoe Bay
- 2021 STPGA Senior Series - Forest Creek
- 2022 STPGA Senior Series - Eagle Pointe, STPGA Senior Series - Lady Bird, TPx Spring Classic, Eastern Chapter Pro-Pro
- 2023 STPGA Senior Series - Beaumont, TPx Player's Cup, STPGA Senior Series - Walden on Lake Conroe
- 2024 TSO Qualifying Series at Landa Park, GolfStatus Tradition Championship, STPGA Senior Professional Championship
- 2025 Jets.com Tradition Championship, 9/9/9 Pro-Pro, Texas Team Championship

== See also ==
- 1995 PGA Tour Qualifying School graduates
- 1997 PGA Tour Qualifying School graduates
- 1998 PGA Tour Qualifying School graduates
