= Kevin Johnson (golfer) =

American professional golfer (born 1967)

Personal information
- Full name: Kevin James Johnson
- Nationality: United States
- Born: April 25, 1967 (age 59) Plymouth, Massachusetts, U.S.
- Height: 6 ft 0 in (1.83 m)
- Weight: 190 lb (86 kg; 14 st)
- Spouse: Christa
- Children: 2

Career
- Sport: Golf
- College: Clemson University
- Turned professional: 1990
- Former tours: PGA Tour; Web.com Tour; Sunshine Tour; Canadian Tour; Golden Bear Tour
- Professional wins: 9

Number of wins by tour
- Sunshine Tour: 1
- Korn Ferry Tour: 6 (Tied-2nd all-time)
- Other: 2

Best results in major championships
- Masters Tournament: DNP
- PGA Championship: DNP
- U.S. Open: CUT: 2000, 2001
- The Open Championship: DNP

Kevin James Johnson (born April 25, 1967) is an American professional golfer.

== Early life and amateur career ==
Johnson was born in Plymouth, Massachusetts. He credits his father, Ken, as his hero for helping him succeed in golf. Johnson grew up in Pembroke, Massachusetts.

Johnson attended Clemson University and was Clemson's first three-time All-American in golf. He also won the 1987 U.S. Amateur Public Links.

== Professional career ==
Early in his career, Johnson played the Southern Africa Tour. In 1992, he won his first professional event at the ICL International.

For most of his career, however, Johnson played on the PGA Tour's developmental tour where he has won six times, first being in 1997. In 2009, he had one of his best seasons where he won twice on the Nationwide Tour. The first victory came in a playoff over Jeff Gallagher at the Rex Hospital Open. His second victory came at the Knoxville Open in a two-hole playoff win over New Zealander Bradley Iles. He finished 13th on the Nationwide Tour money list to earn his 2010 PGA Tour card.

== Personal life ==
In 1998, Johnson married Christa. They have two daughters who also attended Clemson University.

== Awards and honors ==
- From 1985 to 1988 he was the Massachusetts Golf Association's Player of the Year.
- In 2002, Johnson was inducted into the Clemson Hall of Fame.
- In 2017, Johnson was inducted into the Clemson Ring of Honor.

== Amateur wins ==
- 1987 U.S. Amateur Public Links, Massachusetts Amateur
- 1988 Massachusetts Amateur

== Professional wins (9) ==
=== Southern Africa Tour wins (1) ===
No.	Date	Tournament	Winning score	Margin of victory	Runners-up
1	Feb 22, 1992	ICL International	−18 (67-65-65-73=270)	2 strokes	(South Africa) De Wet Basson, (Zimbabwe) Tony Johnstone

=== Nationwide Tour wins (6) ===
No.	Date	Tournament	Winning score	Margin of victory	Runner(s)-up
1	Oct 5, 1997	Nike Puget Sound Open	−18 (65-65-68=198) (Note: Shortened to 54 holes due to weather.)	Playoff	(United States) Michael Clark II, (United States) Steve Jurgensen
2	Apr 25, 1999	Nike South Carolina Classic	−9 (71-71-66-71=279)	1 stroke	(United States) Bob Heintz
3	Aug 27, 2000	Buy.com Permian Basin Open	−20 (64-64-70-70=268)	3 strokes	(Australia) Mark Hensby
4	Jul 30, 2006	Preferred Health Systems Wichita Open	−18 (65-68-67-66=266)	1 stroke	(United States) Matt Kuchar
5	May 31, 2009	Rex Hospital Open	−18 (65-69-65-67=266)	Playoff	(United States) Jeff Gallagher
6	Jun 14, 2009	Knoxville Open	−20 (67-65-68-68=268)	Playoff	(New Zealand) Bradley Iles

Nationwide Tour playoff record (3–0)

No.	Year	Tournament	Opponent(s)	Result
1	1997	Nike Puget Sound Open	(United States) Michael Clark II, (United States) Steve Jurgensen	Won with birdie on second extra hole
2	2009	Rex Hospital Open	(United States) Jeff Gallagher	Won with birdie on first extra hole
3	2009	Knoxville Open	(New Zealand) Bradley Iles	Won with birdie on second extra hole

=== Golden Bear Tour wins (1) ===
No.	Date	Tournament	Winning score	Margin of victory	Runner-up
1	Jan 28, 2005	Estates 1	−12 (65-68-71=204)	1 stroke	(United States) Pleasant Hughes

=== Other wins (1) ===
- 1986 Massachusetts Open (as an amateur)

== Results in major championships ==
Tournament	2000	2001
U.S. Open	CUT	CUT

Note: Johnson only played in the U.S. Open.
CUT = missed the half-way cut

== U.S. national team appearances ==
Amateur

- Eisenhower Trophy: 1988
- Walker Cup: 1989

== See also ==
- 2000 PGA Tour Qualifying School graduates
- 2009 Nationwide Tour graduates
- List of golfers with most Web.com Tour wins
