= Richie Coughlan =

Irish professional golfer

Personal information
- Full name: Richard J. Coughlan
- Nationality: Ireland
- Born: 7 April 1974 (age 52) Tullamore, Ireland
- Height: 5 ft 8 in (1.73 m)

Career
- Sport: Golf
- College: Clemson University
- Turned professional: 1997
- Former tours: PGA Tour; European Tour; NGA Hooters Tour

Richard J. Coughlan (born 7 April 1974) is an Irish former professional golfer who played on the European Tour and the PGA Tour.

== Career ==
In 1997, Coughlan became the first player in history to qualify for the PGA Tour and the European Tour in his rookie season. John E. Morgan duplicated this feat in 2002. Coughlan chose to concentrate on playing in the United States full-time, and finished a career-best 9th at the 1998 B.C. Open, but lost his card at the end of the season. He regained his card for 2001 at the Q-School, but again failed to hold onto it. He last appeared on the Tour in 2003. Coughlan also played on the Nationwide Tour until the end of 2005.

== Team appearances ==
Amateur

- Jacques Léglise Trophy (representing Great Britain & Ireland): 1990 (winners), 1991 (winners)
- European Youths' Team Championship (representing Ireland): 1992, 1994 (winners)
- Palmer Cup (representing Great Britain & Ireland): 1997
- Walker Cup (representing Great Britain & Ireland): 1997

== See also ==
- 1997 PGA Tour Qualifying School graduates
- 2000 PGA Tour Qualifying School graduates
