= 1997 PGA Tour Qualifying School graduates =

This is a list of the 38 players who earned 1998 PGA Tour cards through the PGA Tour Qualifying Tournament in 1997.

Place	Player	PGA Tour starts	Cuts made	Notes
1	(United States) Scott Verplank	255	131	2 PGA Tour wins
2	(United States) Blaine McCallister	405	234	5 PGA Tour wins
T3	(United States) Lee Porter	57	16	
T3	(Trinidad and Tobago) Stephen Ames	3	3	2 European Tour wins; 1 Nike Tour win
T5	(United States) Spike McRoy	28	7	
T5	(United States) Franklin Langham	36	15	1 Nike Tour win
T7	(United States) Sonny Skinner	83	32	2 Nike Tour wins
T7	(United States) Jim McGovern	227	125	1 PGA Tour win
T9	(United States) Bob Gilder	603	398	6 PGA Tour wins
T9	(United States) John Riegger	55	17	
T9	(United States) Bruce Fleisher	434	267	1 PGA Tour win
T9	(Republic of Ireland) Richie Coughlan	0	0	
T9	(United States) Vance Veazey	0	0	
T9	(United States) Guy Hill	3	1	
T9	(United States) Hugh Royer III	66	25	4 Nike Tour wins
T9	(United States) Kent Jones	2	1	
T17	(Sweden) Niclas Fasth	0	0	3 Challenge Tour wins
T17	(United States) Kevin Wentworth	1	0	
T17	(United States) J. P. Hayes	88	42	1 Nike Tour win
T20	(United States) Tim Conley	26	10	2 Nike Tour wins
T20	(United States) Jim Estes	6	0	1 Nike Tour win
T20	(Mexico) Esteban Toledo	33	12	
T20	(United States) Steve Jurgensen	38	20	1 Nike Tour win
T20	(Republic of Ireland) Keith Nolan	0	0	
T20	(United States) Tom Pernice Jr.	163	62	
T26	(United States) John Morse	114	60	1 PGA Tour win
T26	(United States) Clark Dennis	146	63	1 Nike Tour win
T26	(United States) Craig Barlow	1	0	
T26	(Australia) Bradley Hughes	48	22	4 PGA Tour of Australasia wins
T26	(United States) Dicky Pride	118	45	1 PGA Tour win
T26	(Canada) Mike Weir	16	4	
T26	(United States) Jeff Gallagher	35	12	1 Nike Tour win
T33	(United States) Bob Friend	47	22	1 Nike Tour win
T33	(Malaysia) Iain Steel	1	0	1 Nike Tour win
T33	(United States) Mark Wurtz	58	28	1 Nike Tour win
T33	(United States) Bobby Gage	2	0	
T33	(United States) Tim Loustalot	24	6	2 Nike Tour wins
T33	(United States) Lan Gooch	3	0	

PGA Tour rookie in 1998

== 1998 Results ==
Player	Starts	Cuts made	Best finish	Money list rank	Earnings ($)
(United States) Scott Verplank	27	22	2	18	1,223,436
(United States) Blaine McCallister	30	22	T11	125	228,304
(United States) Lee Porter	30	17	3	95	325,415
(Trinidad and Tobago) Stephen Ames*	16	10	3	83	357,859
(United States) Spike McRoy	32	12	T6	145	179,770
(United States) Franklin Langham	30	18	T2	117	248,412
(United States) Sonny Skinner	31	14	T20	179	109,418
(United States) Jim McGovern	28	18	T25	180	106,726
(United States) Bob Gilder	31	12	T9	143	186,913
(United States) John Riegger	29	16	T20	162	150,874
(United States) Bruce Fleisher	25	13	4	134	201,086
(Republic of Ireland) Richie Coughlan*	31	18	T9	151	174,035
(United States) Vance Veazey*	29	6	T33	212	41,145
(United States) Guy Hill*	27	11	T24	199	71,495
(United States) Hugh Royer III	31	11	T5	166	143,963
(United States) Kent Jones*	29	17	T12	171	133,339
(Sweden) Niclas Fasth*	15	3	T30	245	20,360
(United States) Kevin Wentworth*	28	12	T9	119	245,174
(United States) J. P. Hayes	22	12	Win	51	555,272
(United States) Tim Conley	26	10	5	169	140,355
(United States) Jim Estes*	26	8	T16	197	73,438
(Mexico) Esteban Toledo	30	18	T3	93	327,244
(United States) Steve Jurgensen	29	20	T6	187	88,783
(Republic of Ireland) Keith Nolan*	25	4	T47	251	17,203
(United States) Tom Pernice Jr.	27	15	2	55	520,400
(United States) John Morse	23	7	T17	210	43,140
(United States) Clark Dennis	26	14	T3	75	401,440
(United States) Craig Barlow*	29	13	T14	183	98,111
(Australia) Bradley Hughes	23	10	T2	80	370,767
(United States) Dicky Pride	26	4	T27	234	27,680
(Canada) Mike Weir*	27	13	T5	131	218,967
(United States) Jeff Gallagher	29	18	T6	113	259,769
(United States) Bob Friend	30	14	2	57	491,189
(Malaysia) Iain Steel*	24	7	T40	232	29,143
(United States) Mark Wurtz	23	4	T17	213	40,215
(United States) Bobby Gage*	23	5	T22	225	33,881
(United States) Tim Loustalot	24	11	T2	152	172,918
(United States) Lan Gooch*	22	1	T48	340	3,173

*PGA Tour rookie in 1998
T = Tied
The player retained his PGA Tour card for 1999 (finished inside the top 125)
The player did not retain his PGA Tour card for 1999, but retained conditional status (finished between 126-150)
The player did not retain his PGA Tour card for 1999 (finished outside the top 150)

== Winners on the PGA Tour in 1998 ==
No.	Date	Player	Tournament	Winning score	Margin of victory	Runner-up
1	Jun 14	(United States) J. P. Hayes	Buick Classic	−12 (66-67-68=201)	Playoff	(United States) Jim Furyk

== Runners-up on the PGA Tour in 1998 ==
No.	Date	Player	Tournament	Winner	Winning score	Runner-up score
1	Apr 26	(United States) Scott Verplank; Lost in playoff	Greater Greensboro Chrysler Classic	(Namibia) Trevor Dodds	−12 (68-69-70-69=276)	−12 (67-71-66-72=276)
2–3	Jul 19	(United States) Franklin Langham	Deposit Guaranty Golf Classic	(United States) Fred Funk	−18 (69-64-69-68=270)	−16 (67-67-70-68=272)
2–3	Jul 19	(United States) Tim Loustalot	Deposit Guaranty Golf Classic	(United States) Fred Funk	−18 (69-64-69-68=270)	−16 (69-69-68-66=272)
4	Jul 26	(Australia) Bradley Hughes	CVS Charity Classic	(United States) Steve Pate	−15 (70-65-67-67=269)	−14 (68-69-67-66=270)
5	Aug 9	(United States) Scott Verplank (2)	Buick Open	(United States) Billy Mayfair	−17 (70-69-65-67=271)	−15 (71-67-71-64=273)
6	Aug 17	(United States) Tom Pernice Jr.	AT&T Pebble Beach National Pro-Am	(United States) Phil Mickelson	−14 (65-70-67=202)	−13 (67-69-67=203)
7	Sep 13	(United States) Bob Friend; Lost in playoff	Bell Canadian Open	(United States) Billy Andrade	−11 (68-69-69-69=275)	−11 (69-67-68-71=275)

== See also ==
- 1997 Nike Tour graduates
