= Olympia Open =

Nike Puget Sound Open
Tournament information
- Location: Olympia, Washington
- Established: 1996
- Courses: Indian Summer Golf and Country Club
- Par: 72
- Tour: Nike Tour
- Format: Stroke play
- Prize fund: US$200,000
- Month played: October
- Final year: 1997

Tournament record score
- Aggregate: 273 Michael Clark II (1996)
- To par: −15 as above

Final champion
- (United States) Kevin Johnson

Location map
- Location in the United States Location in Washington

The Olympia Open was a golf tournament on the Nike Tour from 1996 to 1997. It was played at Indian Summer Golf & Country Club in Olympia, Washington, which opened in 1992.

== History ==
The 1996 edition had a $200,000 prize pot and was the last event on the Nike Tour. It was disrupted by an anti-Nike protest group with 50 people who attempted to enter the venue. Michael Clark II won the tournament and its $36,000 prize. The 1997 edition was renamed to the Nike Puget Sound Open and was won by Kevin Johnson. The second edition of the tournament was also disrupted by 150 protesters opposed to Nike's labor practices. The PGA announced that they would not return to Olympia for 1998 in favor of a new tournament at the Shadow Hills Country Club in Junction City, Oregon.

== Winners ==
Year	Winner	Score	To par	Margin of victory	Runner(s)-up
Nike Puget Sound Open
1997	(United States) Kevin Johnson	198 (Note: Shortened to 54 holes due to rain.)	−18	Playoff	(United States) Michael Clark II (United States) Steve Jurgensen
Nike Olympia Open
1996	(United States) Michael Clark II	273	−15	4 strokes	(United States) Eric Johnson
