= 2000 PGA Tour =

Golf tour season

2000 PGA Tour season
- Duration: January 6, 2000 – November 12, 2000
- Number of official events: 49
- Most wins: (United States) Tiger Woods (9)
- Money list: (United States) Tiger Woods
- PGA Tour Player of the Year: (United States) Tiger Woods
- PGA Player of the Year: (United States) Tiger Woods
- Rookie of the Year: (United States) Michael Clark II

The 2000 PGA Tour was the 85th season of the PGA Tour, the main professional golf tour in the United States. It was also the 32nd season since separating from the PGA of America.

== Schedule ==
The following table lists official events during the 2000 season.

Date	Tournament	Location	Purse (US$)	Winner (Note: The number in parentheses after each winner's name is the number of PGA Tour events they had won up to and including that tournament. This information is only shown for PGA Tour members.)	OWGR points	Notes
Jan 9	Mercedes Championships	Hawaii	2,900,000	(United States) Tiger Woods (16)	54	Winners-only event
Jan 16	Sony Open in Hawaii	Hawaii	2,900,000	(United States) Paul Azinger (12)	50	
Jan 23	Bob Hope Chrysler Classic	California	3,000,000	(Sweden) Jesper Parnevik (3)	56	Pro-Am
Jan 30	Phoenix Open	Arizona	3,200,000	(United States) Tom Lehman (5)	62	
Feb 7	AT&T Pebble Beach National Pro-Am	California	4,000,000	(United States) Tiger Woods (17)	64	Pro-Am
Feb 13	Buick Invitational	California	3,000,000	(United States) Phil Mickelson (14)	52	
Feb 20	Nissan Open	California	3,100,000	(United States) Kirk Triplett (1)	68	
Feb 27	WGC-Andersen Consulting Match Play Championship	California	5,000,000	(Northern Ireland) Darren Clarke (1)	76	World Golf Championship
Feb 27	Touchstone Energy Tucson Open	Arizona	3,000,000	(United States) Jim Carter (1)	24	Alternate event
Mar 5	Doral-Ryder Open	Florida	3,000,000	(United States) Jim Furyk (5)	54	
Mar 12	Honda Classic	Florida	2,900,000	(United States) Dudley Hart (2)	46	
Mar 19	Bay Hill Invitational	Florida	3,000,000	(United States) Tiger Woods (18)	68	Invitational
Mar 27	The Players Championship	Florida	6,000,000	(United States) Hal Sutton (12)	80	Flagship event
Apr 2	BellSouth Classic	Georgia	2,800,000	(United States) Phil Mickelson (15)	50	
Apr 9	Masters Tournament	Georgia	4,600,000	(Fiji) Vijay Singh (9)	100	Major championship
Apr 16	MCI Classic	South Carolina	3,000,000	(United States) Stewart Cink (2)	56	Invitational
Apr 23	Greater Greensboro Chrysler Classic	North Carolina	3,000,000	(United States) Hal Sutton (13)	50	
Apr 30	Shell Houston Open	Texas	2,800,000	(Australia) Robert Allenby (1)	46	
May 7	Compaq Classic of New Orleans	Louisiana	3,400,000	(Paraguay) Carlos Franco (3)	54	
May 14	GTE Byron Nelson Classic	Texas	4,000,000	(Sweden) Jesper Parnevik (4)	66	
May 21	MasterCard Colonial	Texas	3,300,000	(United States) Phil Mickelson (16)	58	Invitational
May 29	Memorial Tournament	Ohio	3,100,000	(United States) Tiger Woods (19)	64	Invitational
Jun 4	Kemper Insurance Open	Maryland	3,000,000	(United States) Tom Scherrer (1)	46	
Jun 11	Buick Classic	New York	3,000,000	(United States) Dennis Paulson (1)	56	
Jun 18	U.S. Open	California	4,500,000	(United States) Tiger Woods (20)	100	Major championship
Jun 25	FedEx St. Jude Classic	Tennessee	3,000,000	(United States) Notah Begay III (3)	40	
Jul 2	Canon Greater Hartford Open	Connecticut	2,800,000	(United States) Notah Begay III (4)	46	
Jul 9	Advil Western Open	Illinois	3,000,000	(Australia) Robert Allenby (2)	54	
Jul 16	Greater Milwaukee Open	Wisconsin	2,500,000	(United States) Loren Roberts (7)	24	
Jul 23	Open Championship	Scotland	£2,800,000	(United States) Tiger Woods (21)	100	Major championship
Jul 23	B.C. Open	New York	2,000,000	(United States) Brad Faxon (6)	24	Alternate event
Jul 31	John Deere Classic	Illinois	2,600,000	(United States) Michael Clark II (1)	24	
Aug 6	The International	Colorado	3,500,000	(South Africa) Ernie Els (8)	56	
Aug 13	Buick Open	Michigan	2,700,000	(United States) Rocco Mediate (4)	56	
Aug 20	PGA Championship	Kentucky	5,000,000	(United States) Tiger Woods (22)	100	Major championship
Aug 27	WGC-NEC Invitational	Ohio	5,000,000	(United States) Tiger Woods (23)	64	World Golf Championship
Aug 27	Reno–Tahoe Open	Nevada	3,000,000	(United States) Scott Verplank (3)	38	Alternate event
Sep 3	Air Canada Championship	Canada	3,000,000	(South Africa) Rory Sabbatini (1)	28	
Sep 10	Bell Canadian Open	Canada	3,300,000	(United States) Tiger Woods (24)	48	
Sep 17	SEI Pennsylvania Classic	Pennsylvania	3,200,000	(United States) Chris DiMarco (1)	44	New tournament
Sep 24	Westin Texas Open	Texas	2,600,000	(United States) Justin Leonard (5)	34	
Oct 1	Buick Challenge	Georgia	2,300,000	(United States) David Duval (12)	46	
Oct 8	Michelob Championship at Kingsmill	Virginia	3,000,000	(United States) David Toms (4)	46	
Oct 15	Invensys Classic at Las Vegas	Nevada	4,250,000	(United States) Billy Andrade (4)	54	
Oct 22	Tampa Bay Classic	Florida	2,400,000	(United States) John Huston (6)	40	New tournament
Oct 29	National Car Rental Golf Classic Disney	Florida	3,000,000	(United States) Duffy Waldorf (4)	52	
Nov 5	The Tour Championship	Georgia	5,000,000	(United States) Phil Mickelson (17)	62	Tour Championship
Nov 5	Southern Farm Bureau Classic	Mississippi	2,200,000	(United States) Steve Lowery (2)	24	Alternate event
Nov 12	WGC-American Express Championship	Spain	5,000,000	(Canada) Mike Weir (2)	66	World Golf Championship

=== Unofficial events ===
The following events were sanctioned by the PGA Tour, but did not carry official money, nor were wins official.

Date	Tournament	Location	Purse ($)	Winner(s)	Notes
Jan 2	Williams World Challenge	Arizona	3,500,000	(United States) Tom Lehman	New tournament Limited-field event
Jul 11	CVS Charity Classic	Rhode Island	1,000,000	(United States) Justin Leonard and (United States) Davis Love III	Team event
Oct 22	Presidents Cup	Virginia	n/a	Team USA	Team event
Nov 19	Franklin Templeton Shootout	Florida	1,750,000	(United States) Brad Faxon and (United States) Scott McCarron	Team event
Nov 22	PGA Grand Slam of Golf	Hawaii	1,000,000	(United States) Tiger Woods	Limited-field event
Nov 26	Skins Game	Georgia	1,000,000	(Scotland) Colin Montgomerie	Limited-field event
Dec 3	Williams World Challenge	California	3,500,000	(United States) Tiger Woods	Limited-field event
Dec 10	WGC-World Cup	Argentina	3,000,000	(United States) David Duval and (United States) Tiger Woods	World Golf Championship; Team event
Dec 17	Hyundai Team Matches	California	400,000	(United States) Tom Lehman and (United States) Duffy Waldorf	Team event

== Location of tournaments ==
Location of official tournaments of the 2000 PGA Tour in the continental United States and Canada.
Players & Majors
World Golf Championships
Regular events
Alternate events
Tour Championship
Location of official tournaments of the 2000 PGA Tour outside the continental United States and Canada.
Players & Majors
World Golf Championships
Regular events

== Money list ==
The money list was based on prize money won during the season, calculated in U.S. dollars.

Position	Player	Prize money ($)
1	(United States) Tiger Woods	9,188,321
2	(United States) Phil Mickelson	4,746,457
3	(South Africa) Ernie Els	3,469,405
4	(United States) Hal Sutton	3,061,444
5	(Fiji) Vijay Singh	2,573,835
6	(Canada) Mike Weir	2,547,829
7	(United States) David Duval	2,462,846
8	(Sweden) Jesper Parnevik	2,413,345
9	(United States) Davis Love III	2,337,765
10	(United States) Stewart Cink	2,169,727

== Awards ==
Award	Winner	Ref.
PGA Tour Player of the Year (Jack Nicklaus Trophy)	(United States) Tiger Woods	
PGA Player of the Year	(United States) Tiger Woods	
Rookie of the Year	(United States) Michael Clark II	
Scoring leader (PGA Tour – Byron Nelson Award)	(United States) Tiger Woods	
Scoring leader (PGA – Vardon Trophy)	(United States) Tiger Woods	
Comeback Player of the Year	(United States) Paul Azinger	

== See also ==
- 2000 Buy.com Tour
- 2000 Senior PGA Tour
