= New England Open =

Golf tournament

The New England Open was the New England open golf tournament, open to both amateur and professional golfers.

== History ==
It was organized by the New England Section of the Professional Golfers' Association of America. It was played annually form 1974 at a variety of courses around New England. It was cancelled in 2011 but returned in 2012 and ended in 2019.

== Winners ==
Year	Champion	Score	To par	Margin of victory	Runner(s)-up	Venue	Location	Ref.
2019	Jason Thresher	133	−10	2 strokes	Nicholas Pandelena	Quechee Club	Quechee, Vermont	
2018	Braden Shattuck	136	−8	Playoff	Drake Hull (a)	Quechee Club	Quechee, Vermont	
2017	Tournament cancelled due to weather							
2016	Jeff Curl					Quechee Club	Quechee, Vermont	
2015	James Driscoll					Quechee Club	Quechee, Vermont	
2014	Jesse Larson					Belmont CC	Belmont, Massachusetts	
2013	Kyle Gallo	206	−7	2 strokes	Geoffrey Sisk	Belmont CC	Belmont, Massachusetts	
2012	Rob Corcoran					Cyprian Keyes GC	Boylston, Massachusetts	
2011	No tournament							
2010	Jason Parajeckas					Mt. Washington Resort & Hotel	Bretton Woods, New Hampshire	
2009	Scott Spence					Walpole CC	Walpole, Massachusetts	
2008	Bob Kalinowski					Lake Winnipesaukee GC	New Durham, New Hampshire	
2007	Geoffrey Sisk	206	−10	8 strokes	Michael Harris; Eli Zackheim	Lake Winnipesaukee GC	New Durham, New Hampshire	
2006	Geoffrey Sisk	199	−17	4 strokes	Brett Melton	Lake Winnipesaukee GC	New Durham, New Hampshire	
2005	Ron Philo					Lake Winnipesaukee GC	New Durham, New Hampshire	
2004	Rick Karbowski					The International	Bolton, Massachusetts	
2003	Rick Karbowski					Pleasant Valley CC	Sutton, Massachusetts	
2002	Todd Vernon					The International	Bolton, Massachusetts	
2001	Michael Simms					Samoset Resort GC	Rockport, Maine	
2000	Billy Downes					Portland & Woodlands CC	Falmouth, Maine	
1999	Peter Morgan					Portland & Woodlands CC	Falmouth, Maine	
1998	John Hickson					Quechee Club	Quechee, Vermont	
1997	Geoffrey Sisk	208	−8	2 strokes	Mike Baker; Jeff Julian	Quechee Club	Quechee, Vermont	
1996	Geoffrey Sisk	206	−10	Playoff	Fran Quinn	Quechee Club	Quechee, Vermont	
1995	Jeff Julian					Quechee Club	Quechee, Vermont	
1994	Brett Quigley					Quechee Club	Quechee, Vermont	
1993	Jeff Lewis					Quechee Club	Quechee, Vermont	
1992	Rich Parker					Quechee Club	Quechee, Vermont	
1991	Jeff Lewis					Quechee Club	Quechee, Vermont	
1990	Ted O'Rourke					Quechee Club	Quechee, Vermont	
1989	Jeff Lewis					Quechee Club	Quechee, Vermont	
1988	Jeff Bailey					Quechee Club	Quechee, Vermont	
1987	Andy Morse					Quechee Club	Quechee, Vermont	
1986	Andy Morse					Quechee Club	Quechee, Vermont	
1985	Bob Menne					Quechee Club	Quechee, Vermont	
1984	Tom Sutter					Quechee Club	Quechee, Vermont	
1983	Dana Quigley					Quechee Club	Quechee, Vermont	
1982	Jim Becker					Quechee Club	Quechee, Vermont	
1981	Dan Diskin					Quechee Club	Quechee, Vermont	
1980	Lee Danielian					Quechee Club	Quechee, Vermont	
1979	Paul Moran					Mt Snow CC	West Dover, Vermont	
1978	Tony Kaloustian					Ferncroft CC	Middleton, Massachusetts	
1977	Bill Mallon					Ferncroft CC	Middleton, Massachusetts	
1976	Bill Mallon					Ferncroft CC	Middleton, Massachusetts	
1975	Paul Barkhouse					Indian Ridge CC	Andover, Massachusetts	
1974	Harry Toscano					Mt Snow CC	West Dover, Vermont	

(a) – amateur
