= Hanover Country Club =

Coordinates: 43°42′57″N 72°16′39″W

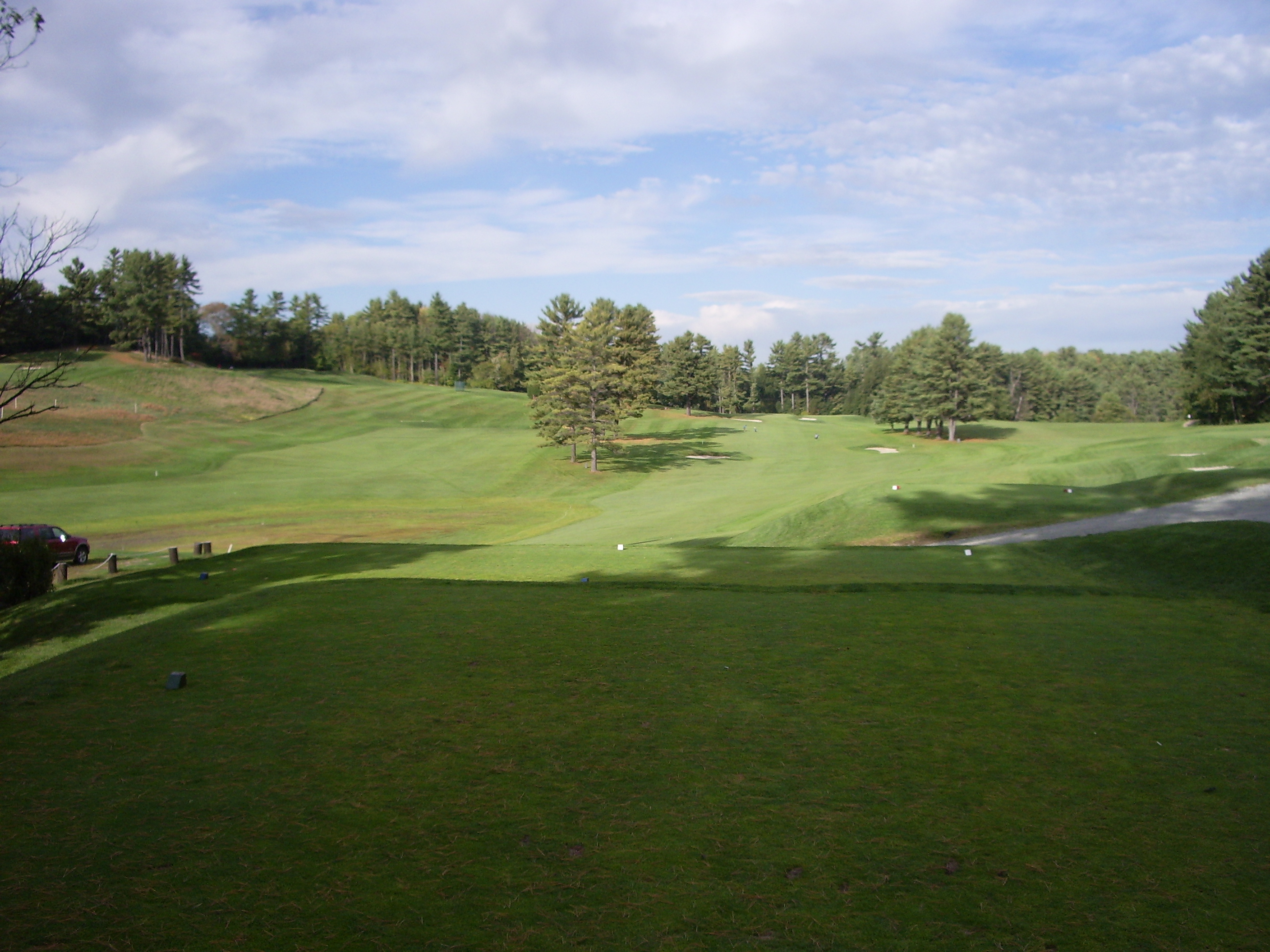
The Hanover Country Club

Hanover Country Club was a college-owned, semi-private golf course located on the campus of Dartmouth College in Hanover, New Hampshire, United States. The college shut down the golf course in 2020 due to the COVID-19 pandemic and for controversial financial reasons.

Known to many members in the Upper Valley simply as "Hanover," Hanover Country Club was a classic New England 18-hole course that underwent significant renovations in 2001. The course was lengthened to 6,500 yards (5,900 m), four new holes were added, and all of the greens were reconstructed. Renovations were made by golf architect Ron Prichard with distinctive Donald Ross-style features; however, the results of the design were somewhat controversial among its members. The 1929 ski jump in the Vale of Tempe that became the symbol of the course was demolished in 1993. The grounds also include "Freshmen Hill", a popular sledding hill for both locals and students of Dartmouth College.

Hanover Country Club was the home course for both the men's and women's golf teams of Dartmouth College. It was also the home of the Hanover High School state champion team. The club has been host to a number of outstanding professionals, including Richard Parker, now also the men's coach at Dartmouth College.

== Practice area ==
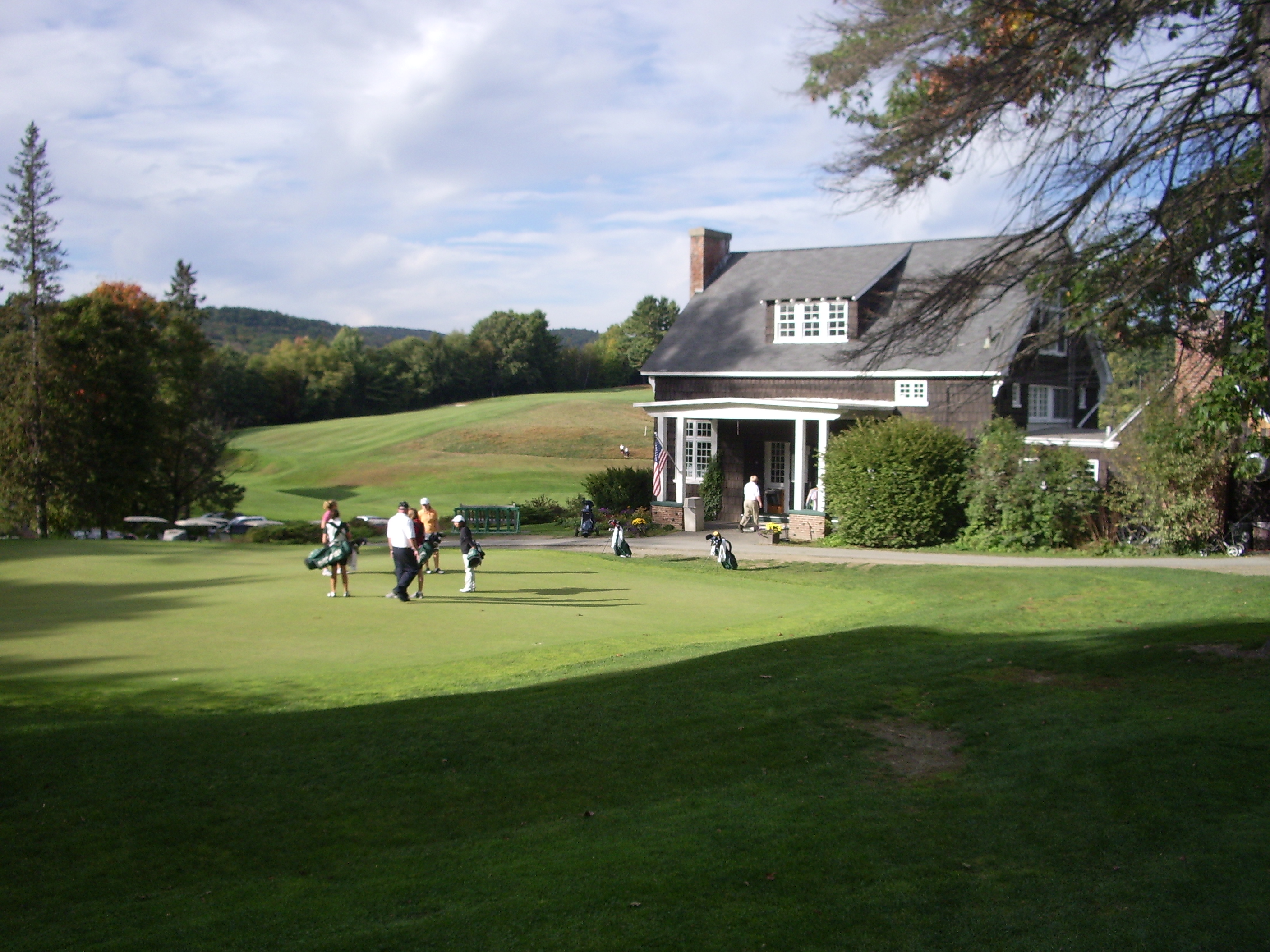
The Hanover Country Club

The practice area at Hanover Country Club consisted of a short game practice area with green and greenside bunker, four practice holes, and a driving range, the last of which is only opened rarely due to an embedded creek that floods during the rainy months of the summer. The practice area was open to all members, wait-list golfers, students of Dartmouth College, and members of the Hanover High School golf team. The four practice holes are remnants of a nine-hole course designed and constructed in 1932 by Ralph Barton, a Dartmouth graduate.

== Clubhouse ==
The historic clubhouse at Hanover Country Club reflects a unique New England tradition. Known for its charm and rural feel, it sells a selection of golf equipment and features a recently renovated restaurant. The restaurant's name of "Colonel Bogey's" refers to the Colonel Bogey March. Art professor Homer Eaton Keyes designed the shingled Arts & Crafts-style clubhouse around 1915 as a remodeling of the club's earlier Golf Barn. The Country Club expects to build a new and less isolated clubhouse closer to Lyme Road in the future.

== History ==
The club was founded during the 1890s and laid out the first nine holes of the current course, known as Hilton Field, in 1899. Dartmouth acquired the course and added second nine holes during 1920.

Remarkable in an age of frequent turnover in the golf industry, Hanover Country Club had only four head professionals in its history. Until recently, the head professional has also assumed the dual role of serving as the men's coach for the Dartmouth golf team. Tommy Keane and Bill Johnson were the first two head pros, followed by Jason Calhoun, who resigned in 2005. Its final Head Pro was Alex Kirk, who at the time served as the Women's Head Golf Coach.

== Closure ==
In 2020 college leadership decided to close the course. Despite many alumni willing to donate a significant amount of money to keep the course open and a steering committee to help oversee operations, the college still decided that it would be best to close it. Along with the golf course the school also removed the Men's and Women's golf teams, but has since revoked that decision. In 1921 Dartmouth Athletic Director, Peter Roby, a member of the Dartmouth Class of 1979, worked with the owners of Montcalm Golf Club in Enfield NH for Montcalm to be the Official Home of Dartmouth Golf.

== External links and sources ==
- Hanover Country Club official page
- Review from golfable.com
