= 2000 PGA Tour Qualifying School graduates =

Following is the list of 2000 PGA Tour Qualifying School graduates, the 36 professional golfers who earned their 2001 PGA Tour card through Q School in 2000.

| Place | Player | PGA Tour starts | Cuts made | Notes |
|---|---|---|---|---|
| 1 | (Australia) Stephen Allan | 4 | 2 | 1 European Tour win |
| T2 | (United States) Brian Wilson | 1 | 0 | |
| T2 | (Canada) David Morland IV | 40 | 14 | 1 Canadian Tour win |
| 4 | (United States) Tommy Tolles | 156 | 90 | 2 Buy.com Tour wins |
| T5 | (United States) Kevin Johnson | 7 | 1 | 3 Buy.com Tour wins |
| T5 | (South Africa) Andrew McLardy | 1 | 1 | 2 Sunshine Tour wins |
| 7 | (United States) Cameron Beckman | 57 | 27 | |
| T8 | (United States) Hunter Haas | 6 | 1 | Played in 1999 Walker Cup |
| T8 | (Republic of Ireland) Richie Coughlan | 33 | 18 | |
| T8 | (New Zealand) Craig Perks | 29 | 12 | |
| T11 | (United States) Bart Bryant | 133 | 66 | Brother of Brad Bryant |
| T11 | (United States) Garrett Willis | 3 | 0 | |
| T11 | (United States) Jeremy Anderson | 1 | 0 | |
| T14 | (Australia) Geoff Ogilvy | 1 | 0 | |
| T14 | (United States) Jason Gore | 4 | 1 | 1 Buy.com Tour win |
| T14 | (United States) Fred Wadsworth | 117 | 36 | 1 PGA Tour win, 1 Sunshine Tour win |
| 17 | (Australia) Ben Ferguson | 0 | 0 | |
| T18 | (Japan) Kaname Yokoo | 13 | 8 | 3 Japan Golf Tour wins |
| T18 | (New Zealand) Frank Nobilo | 115 | 76 | 1 PGA Tour win, 5 European Tour wins, 3 Asian Tour wins, 1 PGA Tour of Australasia win; played in 1994, 1996 and 1998 Presidents Cups |
| T18 | (United States) Sean Murphy | 175 | 78 | |
| T21 | (United States) Cliff Kresge | 9 | 1 | |
| T21 | (United States) Chris Tidland | 8 | 2 | |
| T21 | (United States) Lee Porter | 123 | 44 | |
| T21 | (United States) Michael Muehr | 6 | 1 | |
| T21 | (United States) Craig Barlow | 89 | 48 | |
| 26 | (United States) Rocky Walcher | 29 | 11 | 1 Buy.com Tour win |
| T27 | (United States) Danny Ellis | 1 | 0 | Runner-up in 1993 U.S. Amateur |
| T27 | (United States) Jeff Julian | 29 | 9 | 1 Buy.com Tour win; diagnosed with ALS in October 2001 |
| T27 | (United States) Craig Kanada | 28 | 6 | Won 1990 Western Amateur |
| T27 | (United States) Keith Clearwater | 352 | 194 | 2 PGA Tour wins |
| T31 | (United States) Brent Schwarzrock | 20 | 6 | |
| T31 | (United States) Mike Sposa | 60 | 28 | 1 Buy.com Tour win |
| T31 | (South Korea) K. J. Choi | 33 | 18 | 1 Asian Tour win, 2 Japan Tour wins |
| T31 | (Italy) Emanuele Canonica | 0 | 0 | |
| T31 | (United States) Dicky Pride | 208 | 77 | 1 PGA Tour win |
| T31 | (Sweden) Per-Ulrik Johansson | 31 | 20 | 5 European Tour wins |

- Players in yellow were 2001 PGA Tour rookies.

== 2001 Results ==
| Player | Starts | Cuts made | Best finish | Money list rank | Earnings ($) |
|---|---|---|---|---|---|
| (Australia) Stephen Allan* | 31 | 12 | T19 | 185 | 156,686 |
| (United States) Brian Wilson* | 31 | 12 | 20 | 183 | 169,440 |
| (Canada) David Morland IV | 29 | 15 | T5 | 150 | 279,877 |
| (United States) Tommy Tolles | 31 | 12 | T4 | 145 | 304,644 |
| (United States) Kevin Johnson* | 32 | 14 | T11 | 171 | 205,242 |
| (South Africa) Andrew McLardy* | 26 | 10 | T15 | 193 | 130,160 |
| (United States) Cameron Beckman | 29 | 23 | Win | 50 | 1,071,343 |
| (United States) Hunter Haas* | 30 | 8 | T15 | 196 | 109,110 |
| (Republic of Ireland) Richie Coughlan | 26 | 8 | T25 | 203 | 80,222 |
| (New Zealand) Craig Perks | 30 | 9 | T2 | 113 | 457,127 |
| (United States) Bart Bryant | 10 | 7 | T25 | 206 | 73,884 |
| (United States) Garrett Willis* | 33 | 12 | Win | 77 | 684,038 |
| (United States) Jeremy Anderson* | 28 | 8 | T23 | 199 | 99,464 |
| (Australia) Geoff Ogilvy* | 23 | 7 | T2 | 95 | 525,338 |
| (United States) Jason Gore* | 30 | 12 | T18 | 178 | 180,451 |
| (United States) Fred Wadsworth | 6 | 0 | n/a | n/a | n/a |
| (Australia) Ben Ferguson* | 30 | 7 | T9 | 177 | 187,970 |
| (Japan) Kaname Yokoo* | 27 | 13 | T6 | 105 | 477,989 |
| (New Zealand) Frank Nobilo | 28 | 17 | T8 | 108 | 462,650 |
| (United States) Sean Murphy | 27 | 8 | T58 | 212 | 51,744 |
| (United States) Cliff Kresge* | 31 | 12 | T5 | 163 | 220,649 |
| (United States) Chris Tidland* | 29 | 14 | T23 | 176 | 191,738 |
| (United States) Lee Porter | 30 | 16 | T8 | 137 | 346,462 |
| (United States) Michael Muehr* | 32 | 16 | T7 | 123 | 409,250 |
| (United States) Craig Barlow | 23 | 14 | T6 | 122 | 414,139 |
| (United States) Rocky Walcher | 26 | 3 | T32 | 219 | 32,943 |
| (United States) Danny Ellis* | 27 | 10 | T6 | 159 | 242,487 |
| (United States) Jeff Julian | 22 | 6 | T34 | 211 | 55,132 |
| (United States) Craig Kanada | 28 | 11 | T20 | 192 | 132,163 |
| (United States) Keith Clearwater | 23 | 7 | T27 | 208 | 66,178 |
| (United States) Brent Schwarzrock | 20 | 11 | T8 | 142 | 322,336 |
| (United States) Mike Sposa | 29 | 20 | T11 | 88 | 576,312 |
| (South Korea) K. J. Choi | 29 | 19 | T4 | 65 | 800,326 |
| (Italy) Emanuele Canonica* | 19 | 4 | 7 | 191 | 132,869 |
| (United States) Dicky Pride | 27 | 12 | T6 | 170 | 206,022 |
| (Sweden) Per-Ulrik Johansson* | 29 | 13 | T6 | 97 | 510,488 |

*PGA Tour rookie in 2001
T = Tied
Green background indicates the player retained his PGA Tour card for 2002 (finished inside the top 125).
Yellow background indicates the player did not retain his PGA Tour card for 2002, but retained conditional status (finished between 126 and 150).
Red background indicates the player did not retain his PGA Tour card for 2002 (finished outside the top 150).

== Winners on the PGA Tour in 2001 ==
| No. | Date | Player | Tournament | Winning score | Margin of victory | Runner-up |
|---|---|---|---|---|---|---|
| 1 | Jan 15 | (United States) Garrett Willis | Touchstone Energy Tucson Open | −15 (71-69-64-69=273) | 1 stroke | (United States) Kevin Sutherland |
| 2 | Nov 4 | (United States) Cameron Beckman | Southern Farm Bureau Classic | −19 (66-69-67-67=269) | 1 stroke | (United States) Chad Campbell |

== Runners-up on the PGA Tour in 2001 ==
| No. | Date | Player | Tournament | Winner | Winning score | Runner-up score |
|---|---|---|---|---|---|---|
| 1 | Mar 11 | (Australia) Geoff Ogilvy | Honda Classic | (Sweden) Jesper Parnevik | −18 (65-67-66-72=270) | −17 (65-72-65-69=271) |
| 2 | Mar 11 | (New Zealand) Craig Perks | Honda Classic | (Sweden) Jesper Parnevik | −18 (65-67-66-72=270) | −17 (67-70-68-66=271) |

== See also ==
- 2000 Buy.com Tour graduates
