= Cameron Beckman =

American professional golfer (born 1970)

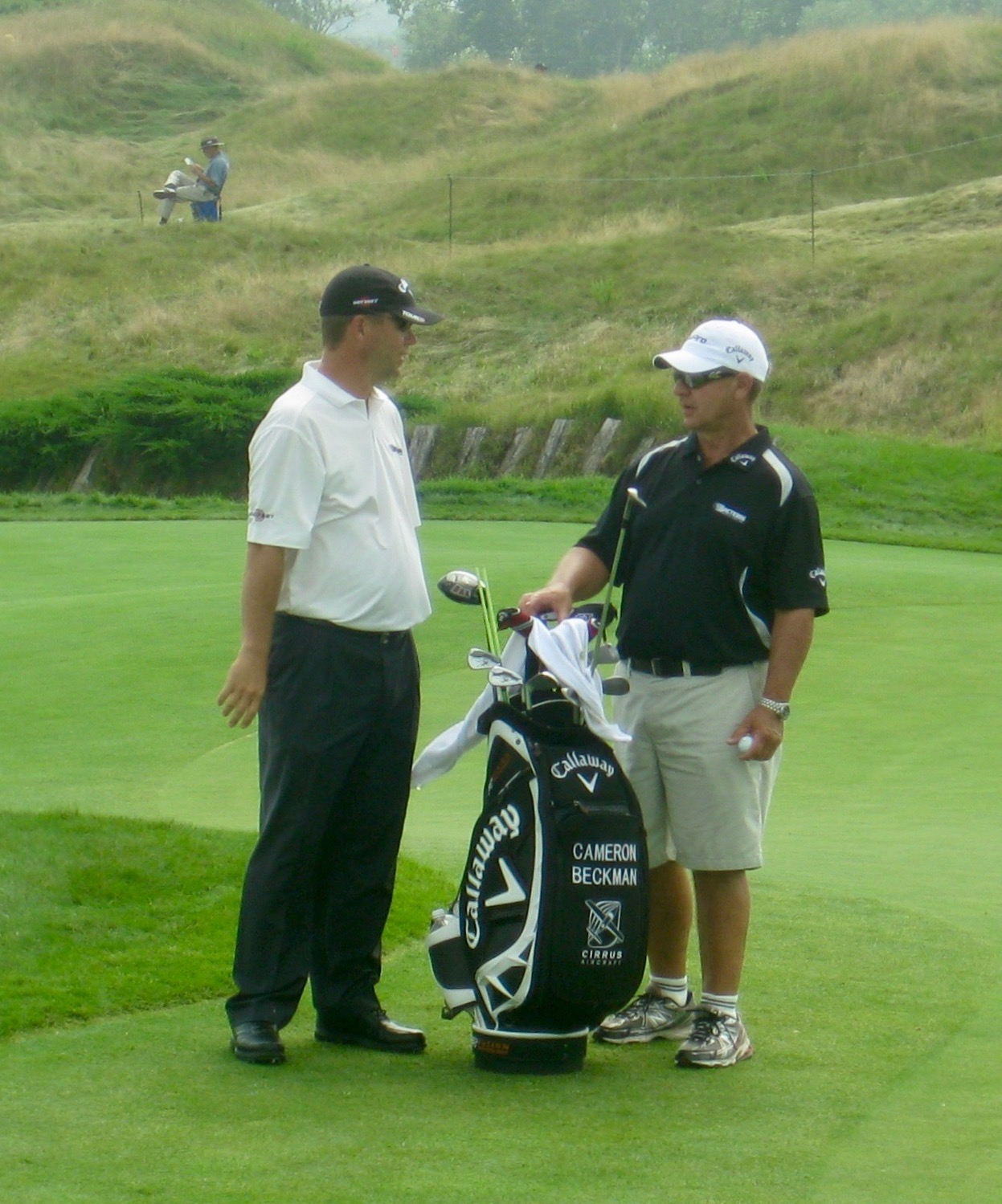
- Beckman at the 2010 PGA Championship

Personal information
- Full name: Cameron Reid Beckman
- Nationality: United States
- Born: February 15, 1970 (age 56) Minneapolis, Minnesota, U.S.
- Height: 6 ft 0 in (1.83 m)
- Weight: 190 lb (86 kg; 14 st)
- Spouse: Jennifer
- Children: 2

Career
- Sport: Golf
- College: Texas Lutheran University
- Turned professional: 1993
- Current tour: PGA Tour Champions
- Former tour: PGA Tour
- Professional wins: 5
- Highest ranking: 76 (March 17, 2002)

Number of wins by tour
- PGA Tour: 3
- PGA Tour Champions: 1
- Other: 1

Best results in major championships
- Masters Tournament: DNP
- PGA Championship: T53: 2002
- U.S. Open: CUT: 2000, 2009
- The Open Championship: CUT: 2004

Cameron Reid Beckman (born February 15, 1970) is an American professional golfer who plays on the PGA Tour Champions. He was previously a member of the PGA Tour, where he was a three-time winner.

== Early life ==
Beckman was born in Minneapolis, Minnesota and was raised in the Twin Cities' suburb of Burnsville. He graduated from Burnsville Senior High School in 1988. He attended Texas Lutheran University, where he majored in Art and was a member of the golf team. Beckman was the 1991 NAIA individual champion. He graduated and turned pro in 1993.

== Professional career ==
Beckman earned his first win on the PGA Tour at the 2001 Southern Farm Bureau Classic. Seven years later, at the 2008 Frys.com Open at the Greyhawk Golf Club in Scottsdale, Arizona, he shot a final round 63 to force a playoff against Kevin Sutherland. Beckman won the tournament with a par on the second playoff hole to get his second PGA Tour win and secure his card for the 2009 and 2010 PGA Tour seasons. He earned his third PGA Tour title at the 2010 Mayakoba Golf Classic with a two-stroke win over 54-hole leader Joe Durant and rookie Brian Stuard. Beckman finished with a three-under-par 67. The event was held at the Mayakoba Resort in Playa del Carmen, Mexico.

=== Senior career ===
In July 2021, Beckman won the Dick's Sporting Goods Open in Endicott, New York, defeating Ernie Els by one stroke. This win gave him full status on the PGA Tour Champions until 2022. This was his first win in 4,151 days, since he won the Mayakoba Golf Classic on the PGA Tour in 2010.

== Personal life ==
Beckman lives with his family in San Antonio, Texas.

== Awards and honors ==
In 1994, Beckman was awarded the Lone Star Tour Player of the Year.

== Professional wins (5) ==
=== PGA Tour wins (3) ===
No.	Date	Tournament	Winning score	Margin of victory	Runner(s)-up
1	Nov 4, 2001	Southern Farm Bureau Classic	−19 (66-69-67-67=269)	1 stroke	(United States) Chad Campbell
2	Oct 26, 2008	Frys.com Open	−18 (69-66-64-63=262)	Playoff	(United States) Kevin Sutherland
3	Feb 21, 2010	Mayakoba Golf Classic	−15 (65-68-69-67=269)	2 strokes	(United States) Joe Durant, (United States) Brian Stuard

PGA Tour playoff record (1–1)

No.	Year	Tournament	Opponent(s)	Result
1	2008	Frys.com Open	(United States) Kevin Sutherland	Won with par on second extra hole
2	2013	Sanderson Farms Championship	(United States) Woody Austin, (United States) Daniel Summerhays	Austin won with birdie on first extra hole

=== Other wins (1) ===
- 1998 Texas State Open

=== PGA Tour Champions wins (1) ===
No.	Date	Tournament	Winning score	Margin of victory	Runner-up
1	Jul 4, 2021	Dick's Sporting Goods Open	−12 (67-69-68=204)	1 stroke	(South Africa) Ernie Els

== Results in major championships ==
Tournament	2000	2001	2002	2003	2004	2005	2006	2007	2008	2009	2010
U.S. Open	CUT									CUT	
The Open Championship					CUT						
PGA Championship			T53							CUT	CUT

Note: Beckman never played in the Masters Tournament.

Did not play

CUT = missed the half-way cut
"T" = tied

== Results in The Players Championship ==
Tournament	2002	2003	2004	2005	2006	2007	2008	2009	2010	2011
The Players Championship	CUT	CUT	T26	T73			WD	T66	CUT	CUT

Did not play

CUT = missed the halfway cut
WD = withdrew
"T" indicates a tie for a place

== Results in World Golf Championships ==
Tournament	2009
Match Play	
Championship	
Invitational	T64
Champions	

Did not play

"T" = Tied

== Results in senior major championships ==
Tournament	2021	2022	2023
The Tradition	T42	T47	
Senior PGA Championship	T72	CUT	T70
U.S. Senior Open	CUT	T41	CUT
Senior Players Championship	T63	T25	T61
The Senior Open Championship			

Did not play

CUT = missed the halfway cut
"T" indicates a tie for a place

== See also ==
- 1998 PGA Tour Qualifying School graduates
- 1999 PGA Tour Qualifying School graduates
- 2000 PGA Tour Qualifying School graduates
- 2006 PGA Tour Qualifying School graduates
