= Craig Barlow =

American professional golfer (born 1972)

Personal information
- Full name: Craig Alan Barlow
- Nationality: United States
- Born: July 23, 1972 (age 54) Henderson, Nevada
- Height: 5 ft 11 in (1.80 m)
- Weight: 200 lb (91 kg; 14 st)

Career
- Sport: Golf
- Turned professional: 1995
- Former tours: PGA Tour; Web.com Tour eGolf Professional Tour
- Professional wins: 1
- Highest ranking: 89 (March 12, 2006)

Best results in major championships
- Masters Tournament: DNP
- PGA Championship: CUT: 2006
- U.S. Open: T26: 2006
- The Open Championship: CUT: 2008

Craig Alan Barlow (born July 23, 1972) is an American professional golfer.

== Early life ==
Barlow was born in Henderson, Nevada.

== Professional career ==
In 1995, Barlow turned professional. He played on the PGA Tour and Nationwide Tour from 1998 to 2011.

== Personal life ==
Barlow is a cousin of Brandon Flowers who is the lead singer of The Killers.

== Professional wins (1) ==
=== eGolf Professional Tour wins (1) ===
No.	Date	Tournament	Winning score	Margin of victory	Runners-up
1	Jul 3, 2014	ArrowCreek Open	−15 (69-68-64=201)	Playoff	(United States) Ryan Dillon, (United States) Tyler Raber

== Results in major championships ==
Tournament	1994	1995	1996	1997	1998	1999
U.S. Open	CUT					
The Open Championship						
PGA Championship						

Tournament	2000	2001	2002	2003	2004	2005	2006	2007	2008	2009
U.S. Open						82	T26		CUT	
The Open Championship									CUT	
PGA Championship							CUT			

Tournament	2010	2011	2012	2013	2014
U.S. Open	T77				CUT
The Open Championship					
PGA Championship					

Note: Barlow never played in the Masters Tournament.

Did not play

CUT = missed the half-way cut
"T" = tied

== See also ==
- 1997 PGA Tour Qualifying School graduates
- 1998 PGA Tour Qualifying School graduates
- 2000 PGA Tour Qualifying School graduates
- 2004 PGA Tour Qualifying School graduates
