= Michael Clark II =

American professional golfer (born 1969)

Personal information
- Nationality: United States
- Born: May 4, 1969 (age 57) Kingsport, Tennessee, U.S.
- Height: 5 ft 10 in (1.78 m)
- Weight: 180 lb (82 kg; 13 st)

Career
- Sport: Golf
- College: Georgia Tech
- Turned professional: 1992
- Former tour: PGA Tour
- Professional wins: 3

Number of wins by tour
- PGA Tour: 1
- Korn Ferry Tour: 2

Best results in major championships
- Masters Tournament: DNP
- PGA Championship: T15: 2000
- U.S. Open: CUT: 1993, 1997, 2002
- The Open Championship: DNP

Achievements and awards
- PGA Tour Rookie of the Year: 2000

Michael Clark II (born May 4, 1969) is an American professional golfer.

== Early life and amateur career ==
Clark was born in Kingsport, Tennessee. He attended Georgia Tech.

== Professional career ==
In 1992, he turned professional. He won two events on the PGA Tour's official developmental tour in the 1990s, but it took him some years to win a place on the PGA Tour itself.

However, his 2000 rookie season on the PGA Tour was a great success, with victory in the John Deere Classic and the PGA Tour Rookie of the Year award, but he struggled to build on this, and by 2005 he was back on the Nationwide Tour. Clark last played in a PGA Tour-sanctioned event in 2012.

== Professional wins (3) ==
=== PGA Tour wins (1) ===
No.	Date	Tournament	Winning score	Margin of victory	Runner-up
1	Jul 31, 2000	John Deere Classic	−19 (70-65-63-67=265)	Playoff	(United States) Kirk Triplett

PGA Tour playoff record (1–0)

No.	Year	Tournament	Opponent	Result
1	2000	John Deere Classic	(United States) Kirk Triplett	Won with birdie on fourth extra hole

=== Nike Tour wins (2) ===
No.	Date	Tournament	Winning score	Margin of victory	Runner-up
1	Oct 6, 1996	Nike Olympia Open	−15 (70-70-69-64=273)	4 strokes	(United States) Eric Johnson
2	Jul 5, 1998	Nike Hershey Open	−11 (66-68-66-73=273)	2 strokes	(United States) Bob Burns

Nike Tour playoff record (0–1)

No.	Year	Tournament	Opponents	Result
1	1997	Nike Puget Sound Open	(United States) Kevin Johnson, (United States) Steve Jurgensen	Johnson won with birdie on second extra hole

== Results in major championships ==
Tournament	1993	1994	1995	1996	1997	1998	1999	2000	2001	2002
U.S. Open	CUT				CUT					CUT
PGA Championship								T15	CUT	

Note: Clark never played in the Masters Tournament nor The Open Championship.

Did not play

CUT = missed the half-way cut
"T" = tied

== See also ==
- 1999 PGA Tour Qualifying School graduates
