= Jeff Julian (golfer) =

American professional golfer (1961–2004)

Personal information
- Full name: Jeffrey Jackson Wedgwood Julian
- Nationality: United States
- Born: July 29, 1961 Portland, Maine, U.S.
- Died: July 15, 2004 (aged 42) Norwich, Vermont, U.S.

Career
- Sport: Golf
- College: Clemson University
- Status: Professional
- Former tours: Nike Tour; PGA Tour
- Professional wins: 4

Number of wins by tour
- Korn Ferry Tour: 1
- Other: 3

Best results in major championships
- Masters Tournament: DNP
- PGA Championship: DNP
- U.S. Open: CUT: 1990, 1995, 1996
- The Open Championship: DNP

Jeffrey Jackson Wedgwood Julian (July 29, 1961 – July 15, 2004) was an American professional golfer on the PGA Tour.

== Early life ==
Julian was born in Portland, Maine. He was the grandson of famed basketball coach Doggie Julian.

== Amateur career ==
Julian briefly attended Clemson University. However, he did not get a golf scholarship. He then attempted to walk on to the golf team but failed. He subsequently dropped out of university.

== Professional career ==
Shortly after leaving university, Julian returned to New England and turned pro. Shortly thereafter, he earned his PGA of America class A status.

Julian played on the PGA Tour's developmental tour, the Ben Hogan Tour, during its inaugural 1990 season. He did not have much success, making the cut in only three of 13 events. He lost status on tour. In the interim Julian played local New England events, winning the 1992 Greater Bangor Open and 1995 New England Open.

In late 1995, Julian earned his PGA Tour card at 1995 PGA Tour Qualifying School. However, he did not have much success on the PGA Tour, making the cut in only nine of 26 events. He returned to the tour's developmental tour the following year, winning the 1997 Nike Dominion Open. He played on the tour the next three seasons with limited success.

In the early 2000s, he had some success. In 2000, he won the Cape Cod Open. Late in the year, he tried out again at the 2000 PGA Tour Qualifying School and was successful. However, he did not have much success during the 2001 season. He played the 2002 PGA Tour season on sponsor's exemptions.

== Personal life and death ==
Julian was married to Kimberly. He had two sons.

In October 2001, Julian was diagnosed with Amyotrophic lateral sclerosis (ALS), also known as Lou Gehrig's disease. In July 2004, he died from the disease.

== Awards and honors ==
In 2002, Julian was the recipient of the Ben Hogan Award

== Professional wins (4) ==
=== Nike Tour wins (1) ===
No.	Date	Tournament	Winning score	Margin of victory	Runner-up
1	May 18, 1997	Nike Dominion Open	−11 (68-68-69-72=277)	1 stroke	(United States) Bobby Wadkins

=== Other wins (3) ===
- 1992 Greater Bangor Open
- 1995 New England Open
- 2000 Cape Cod Open

== Results in major championships ==
Tournament	1990	1991	1992	1993	1994	1995	1996
U.S. Open	CUT					CUT	CUT

Did not play

CUT = missed the halfway cut
Note: Julian only played in the U.S. Open.

== See also ==
- 1995 PGA Tour Qualifying School graduates
- 2000 PGA Tour Qualifying School graduates
