= Bruce Douglass =

American professional golfer (born 1953)

Personal information
- Full name: Bruce Douglass
- Nationality: United States
- Born: November 19, 1953 (age 72) Brockton, Massachusetts, U.S.

Career
- Sport: Golf
- College: Murray State University
- Turned professional: 1976
- Former tours: Asia Golf Circuit; PGA Tour
- Professional wins: 7

Best results in major championships
- Masters Tournament: DNP
- PGA Championship: DNP
- U.S. Open: T62: 1976
- The Open Championship: DNP

Achievements and awards
- Massachusetts Golfer of the Year: 1976
- Met PGA Assistant's Player of the Year: 1985

Bruce Douglass (born November 19, 1953) is an American professional golfer. Douglass had a successful career as an amateur. He won five tournaments for Murray State University, the most ever for the school, and back-to-back Massachusetts Amateur championships. He struggled transitioning to the professional game, however, failing four times at PGA Tour Qualifying school. Before the 1980 season, he made it on to the PGA Tour but played only three seasons, recording only one top ten. In 1984, Douglass took a job as an assistant professional at Winged Foot Golf Club. Despite holding a prestigious position and having success on the local Met PGA, Douglass resigned after only two years, deciding to work as an investment banker.

== Early life ==
Douglass was born in Brockton, Massachusetts. He began playing golf at the age of eight. His father got him into the game. Chick Fisher, the pro at Brockton Golf Course, also served as a mentor. However, baseball was his big sport growing up. He injured his arm, though, and decided to focus on golf. "I ruined my arm as a pitcher in Little League and the doctors said I shouldn't play baseball," he later said. "So I turned to golf."

In his mid-teens, Douglass first achieved some media attention. In July 1968, he played The Boston Globe boys golf tournament in Hingham, Massachusetts. Douglass played in the 14–15 years old division. Douglass had the lead late but "missed a golden opportunity to win the championship," finishing bogey-double bogey. He lost by one. In July 1969, he played the Massachusetts Golf Association's (MGA) Junior Championship. He qualified within the Junior-Junior division, finishing third place. However, he lost in the second round of the event proper. In July 1970, he played a USGA Junior qualifier. However, he failed at qualifying by a large number, shooting an 84, missing the cut-off by 11 strokes. A month later, in August 1970, he qualified for the MGA Junior Championship again. He lost in the first round. Later in the month, he played the New England Junior Open at Ponkapoag Country Club in Canton, Massachusetts. He once more lost in the first round.

At the age of 17, Douglass had his first era of sustained success as a junior golfer. In July 1971, he played a USGA Junior qualifier. Douglass shot a 75 and was tied for the final slot. Douglass "grabbed the last spot by winning a four-man sudden death playoff on the second hole." In the summer, he also qualified for the MGA's Massachusetts Junior. The event proper was held at the Chestnut Hill Country Club. In the second round, Douglass faced Dave DiRico of Chicopee, Massachusetts. Douglass led 5 up after 12 holes but DiRico forced extra holes. Douglass, however, won the 19th hole to move on. He eventually made it to the semifinals.

== Amateur career ==
In September 1971, Douglass entered Broward Community College in Cocoa, Florida. In the summer, however, he would return to Massachusetts to play some events. In July 1972, he played the Catholic Youth Organization (CYO) tournament, another event at Ponkapoag Golf Course. Douglass played in the intermediate division. He won all of his early matches and faced Jeff Lewis, a future PGA Tour pro, in the finals. Lewis narrowly defeated him 2 & 1. In August, he played the New England Junior, also at Ponkapoag. In the first round he "upset" the defending champion, Bruce Martins, defeating him on the 18th hole, 1 up. He ultimately reached the finals, recording another second-place finish. In September 1972, he returned to Broward. In the spring, he began recording some highlights for the golf team. In April of the academic year, Broward faced Miami Dade Community College North. Douglass was the joint medalist and their team won. Later in the month, Broward played in the Division IV junior golf championship at Mirror Lake Golf Course in Lehigh Acres, Florida. In the first round, playing against "25 to 30 miles per hour winds," Douglass shot a 74 (+2) to put himself in second place among individuals and led Broward to the lead. Overall, Broward finished in second place. A week later, the Florida Junior College Golf Tournament was held. Twenty universities participated in the tournament including Broward. Douglass shot under-par in the second round and Broward finished in fourth place overall. In the summer, he again returned to Massachusetts. In July, he qualified for the Massachusetts Amateur for the first time. Later in the month he played the CYO tournament again, this time in the senior division. Douglass won his first two matches. In the semifinals, Douglass defeated medalist Steve Condon, 1 up. In the finals, he defeated Steve O'Kane 4 & 3. It was the most "noteworthy win" of his career until that point.

In the fall, Douglass began to attend at Murray State University (MSU) in Murray, Kentucky. He was a transfer student from Broward. In September, Douglass played the Murray State Intercollegiate Invitational. Among dozens of individuals competing, Douglass finished in the top ten. His team recorded a fourth-place finish among 12 teams. A month later, Murray State played the Mid-South Fall Intercollegiate Golf Tournament. Murray again finished in fourth place. Douglass, meanwhile, improved his record, finishing runner-up. In April, Murray State played the Illinois Intercollegiate Invitational tournament. Douglass was the low scorer for MSU. At the end of the academic year, MSU participated in the Ohio Valley Conference All-Sports Championship. Douglass finished in joint fifth among individuals. In the summers, he continued returning to the northeast where he had some success. In July, he played the four-round New England Amateur at Metacomet Country Club in Providence, Rhode Island. In the second round, Douglass recorded seven birdies on his way to a three-under-par 67. "This is close to the best round I ever had in competition," he told the Hartford Courant at the end of the day. He took a four-stroke lead. Douglass "had trouble" during the two-round finale but still finished in the top five. In August, he qualified for the U.S. Amateur for the first time.

In September, he returned to Kentucky to play for Murray State. Early in the season, the school's golf coach Buddy Hewitt noted, "Bruce has made vast improvements in his game the last year." Late in September, his team played the two-round Murray State intercollegiate again. Douglass "pace[d]" his team to victory, shooting a 138 total. He also won the individual component. In October, Douglass played the LSU Invitational. He would be playing against some of the best college golfers in the country. In the first round, Douglass shot a two-under-par 69 to tie for second with, among others, D. A. Weibring. In the second round, Douglass shot a 66 (−5) to take the lead among individuals. On Sunday, Douglass shot over-par but "outlasted four LSU golfers" to earn individual honors. It was his second win of the season. The Paducah Sun referred to it as "the biggest prize ever won by a Murray golfer." He won his third tournament of the year at the University of Kentucky intercollegiate. In March, he played the two-round Kentucky Intercollegiate. According to The Mayfield Messenger, Douglass was "a strong choice for individual honors." Douglass indeed contented, tying for the first round lead. The final round was cancelled due to rain and Douglass was declared the joint winner. Murray State finished in second place as a team only behind the University of Kentucky. In April, they played the Tennessee Tech Spring Intercollegiate Golf Tournament. Murray State won while Douglass "captured medalist honors for the fifth time this season." It was his final victory of the season. During his senior year, he was referred to by The Paducah Sun as "the top golfer in Murray history."

In the summer, Douglass returned to Massachusetts. In July, he played the Massachusetts Amateur. Douglass reached the semifinals where he faced Bill Mallon. Mallon, a future PGA Tour pro, was the clear favorite. He was the two-time defending champ and had won his previous 16 matches in the event going back a number of years. Douglass, however, won four holes on the front nine to build a sizable lead. Mallon birdied the 12th and 14th holes but "Douglass didn't panic." He won the 16th hole and "startled" Mallon with a 3 & 2 victory. In the finals, Douglass faced Bobby Caprera, the captain of Duke University's golf team. The finals were 36-holes long. It was a back-and-forth affair and the match was all square after 30 holes. However, Douglass made a number of mid-range putts down the stretch to win the match, 2 & 1, and secure the championship. After the event, Douglass told The Boston Globe, "Of course this is the biggest tournament I've ever won." A week later, he began play at the New England Amateur at Vesper Country Club. In the first round, Douglass eagled the par-5 11th hole on the way to a two-under-par 70. He had a one-stroke lead. In the second round, however, Bill Mallon "surged ahead" with a four-under-par 68. The final two rounds were played over one day. Mallon shot over-par in the morning round but Douglass shot a 75 to fall four behind. In the final round, however, Douglass went "charging into contention" with consecutive birdies on #4-6 "to move into a momentary tie." Douglass "faded" on the back nine, though, and "had to settle for the runner-up spot" behind Mallon. In August, Douglass qualified for the U.S. Amateur. Douglass reached the fourth round, defeating future PGA Tour pro Lance Ten Broeck along the way. In September, Douglass returned to Murray State to finish his degree. He did not play golf during the semester. Instead he focused on his studies. In December, he graduated with a degree in Business Administration. Despite the success, Douglass did not intend to turn professional. "It could turn from enjoyment into work," he told the Globe. "I'd prefer to stay an amateur instead of trying to go out there and beat your brains out."

In the spring, he returned to New England. During the summer of 1976, Douglass had one of the best season's in the history of Massachusetts amateur golf. In May, Douglass played local qualifying for the U.S. Open. At Wellesley Country Club, Douglass shot 147 to finish one back of medalist Jeff Lewis. Sectional qualifying was held at Stanwich Golf Course in Greenwich, Connecticut. Douglass shot rounds of 74 and 75 to get into a playoff for the last spots. He birdied the first hole to move on to the tournament proper. He was the first amateur from Massachusetts to qualify for the U.S. Open since the 1940s. The 1976 U.S. Open was held at the Atlanta Athletic Club. In the first round, Douglass played excellently, scoring even-par through the first 15 holes and was on the leaderboard. He closed poorly, shooting three-over-par over the last three holes. But his 73 (+3) put him near the top ten. In the second round, he played much worse but made a "rare" birdie on the 18th hole to ensure that he made the cut. He ultimately finished third low amateur only behind Mike Reid and John Fought. He later said his experience at the U.S. Open stimulated thoughts about becoming a professional golfer. "I liked the professional climate about it," he told The Boston Globe. "I wasn't thinking about a pro career before. Now I am." A week after the U.S. Open, Douglass began play at the Massachusetts Open at Worcester Country Club. In the final round at the challenging course, Douglass matched par to tie for the round of the day. He entered a sudden-death playoff with Bob Menne and Paul Barkhouse. However, Douglass three-putted the first playoff hole to finish second. Despite the loss his good placing, in the words of The Boston Globe sportswriter Joe Concannon, "added weight to [Douglass'] credentials as the man to beat." In July, he began play at the Massachusetts Amateur as defending champion. The event was at The Country Club in Brookline, Massachusetts. In the first round, Douglass had to win the 18th hole to defeat unheralded teenager Dave Lane, 1 up. However, he easily won his next four matches to reach the finals. Like the previous year, the finals would be two rounds long. He would play Peter Teravainen this time. Also like last year's finals against Caprera, the match turned out to be a back-and-forth affair; there were a total of six lead changes and a number of ties. On the 36th hole, though, it looked like Douglass had the match in hand, possessing a 1 up lead. However, the "seemingly-beaten" Teravainen made a difficult 18-foot birdie putt to force extra holes. On the 37th hole, Douglass had a birdie putt of similar length to end it. "I said, 'It's now or never,'" Douglass told himself. He made it for his second straight Massachusetts Amateur title. Later in the month, he played the Francis Ouimet Memorial. Douglass was victorious once more, again winning with a lengthy birdie putt on the final hole. In August, Douglass attempted to qualify for the U.S. Amateur. At final qualifying at Spring Valley Country Club, Douglass generally played poorly but birdied the final two holes to get into a playoff. He then birdied both holes of the playoff to move on. "That was the greatest finish I've ever had," he told the Globe. At the end of the year he had the lowest handicap of any golfer, professional or amateur, in the entire state of Massachusetts. In addition, by virtue of his excellent play through 1976, Douglass won the Massachusetts Golf Association's inaugural Player of the Year award.

== Professional career ==
As of November 1976, Douglass had turned pro. He had financial sponsors to support him. Despite the financial security and strong amateur career, Douglass' transition to the pro ranks was not smooth. Douglass played the Fall 1976 PGA Tour Qualifying School but played "disappointingly" and did not move on. In early 1977, Douglass started playing the Florida minitours. However, he did not have much success. "It's been a drought," he told The Boston Globe. "I played the Space Coast mini tour, but I never really did anything." In the spring, he intended to play Spring 1977 PGA Tour Qualifying School at Pinehurst No. 2 in Pinehurst, North Carolina. However, Douglass became ill the first day and opened with an 80. "I came down with some bug that first day," he said. "I had a splitting headache and couldn't do anything right." Though he played better for the remainder of the tournament he still missed the 54-hole cut. In June, he failed at qualifying for the U.S. Open. "I just played really terrible all afternoon," he told the Globe. In the summer, he played "the New England circuit." His play improved though was erratic. In June, he finished solo sixth at the Vermont Open. In July, he played excellently at the three-round Greater Bangor Open. In the final round, he built a four-stroke lead at the turn, lost it by the 16th, but finished birdie-birdie to win by one. In August, however, at the Maine Open, he was not in contention, finishing in joint 14th place. Days later he began play at the two-round Western Massachusetts Open. He opened with a one-under-par 69 to put himself near the lead. However, he shot over-par in the final round but still finished in the top ten. Late in the year, he played the National Golfers of America Tour, a minitour in Arizona. At the circuit's stop in Scottsdale, Arizona he was tied with Ray Arrino entering the 72nd hole. Douglass "had a chance to win" on the par-5 18th; however, his five-foot birdie putt missed. Arinno and Douglass entered a three-hole aggregate playoff. Douglass' "tough-luck" day continued. He hit his approach to within a foot on the first playoff hole to assure birdie but Arrino holed a 48-foot pitch shot to match him. On the third playoff hole, Douglass had a six-foot birdie putt to tie. However, he "misfired" giving Arrino the win.

In early 1978, Douglass elected to play the Asia Golf Circuit. His play improved. In February, he played the Hong Kong Open. He shot a second round 66 to move into contention. In March, he opened with a two-under-par 70 at the Thailand Open put him within two of the lead. He then recorded three consecutive rounds of 71 to finish solo second, only behind Hsu Sheng-san. He was the only player to score under-par rounds every day. Later in the month, he played the Malaysian Open. Douglass opened with a 67 to take a one-stroke lead over Simon Owen. He finished in the top ten. Later in March, he played the Singapore Open. Peter Thomson selected Douglass as one of his favorites. Douglass himself was pleased with his recent performances. "I must admit that I have been fairly consistent and I think I can improve even further," he told reporters. In the pro-am, Douglass played well, finishing joint third. He was at 14th place on the Order of Merit at the end of the month.

In May, he returned to Massachusetts. Despite the good play in Asia, the quality of his play while in the United States continued "regressing." Douglass attempted to qualify for the PGA Tour again at Spring 1978 PGA Tour Qualifying School. However, he withdrew after 33 holes. It was his third failure at tour school. He also attempted to qualify for the 1978 U.S. Open. However, his 154 total "didn't even rate a playoff shot at an alternate's berth." After the event, Douglass told The Boston Globe: "I have a desire problem. The enjoyment is gone. Golf is work now. I tell you, I have no plans at all now." He decided to not play golf at all for a month. In June, he resumed play. However, the rest did not seem to help him. Late in the month, he finished in 29th place at the Massachusetts Open. In July, he played the Greater Bangor Open as defending champion. Douglass, however, "had his problems" in the first round and opened with a three-over-par 73. He followed with a 79 and was not in the picture thereafter. In August, he played the Maine Open. He did not place well, finishing T-31. In August, he "severely" sprained his ankle. In his words, "he ripped the ankle to shreds." "I couldn't played golf for five months," he told the Globe. He got a job at as a laborer at a sheet metal factory. He worked at that job for the remainder of the calendar year and did not play any golf while his ankle healed. The five month reprieve from golf was actually useful, though, as it, in Douglass' words, "brought my incentive back."

According to The Boston Globe, "after three years of frustration" Douglass' game improved in 1979. Early in the year, he once again played the Asia Golf Circuit. In March, he played the Thailand Open. In the third round, Douglass shot a 66, the round of the day, to move into joint second, one back of Ireneo Legaspi. Douglass shot over-par in the final round though still finished in the top ten. In April, he played the Korea Open. In the final round, Douglass shot a 69, the round of the day, to record a high finish. He later credited his good play in Asia as a catalyst for future success. In the summer, Douglass played the National Golfers of America mintour again. In early August, Douglass closed with a 67 in an event in Phoenix, Arizona. He finished in joint fourth. The following week, he played a four-round event at the Los Serranos Country Club in Chino Hills, California. Douglass opened with a 65 (−6) to take "sole possession of second place." In the second round, he shot another 65 to take the lead. In the final round, Douglass recorded a four-under-par 67 to win by one. He intended to try out for the PGA Tour once more at PGA Tour Qualifying School. It was his "fifth shot at qualifying." At Regionals, held at Fairfax, Virginia, Douglass was successful, moving on to finals at Waterwood National Country Club in Huntsville, Texas. At the finals for Fall 1979 PGA Tour Qualifying School, Douglass "cruised on the flat Waterwood layout, playing as well as he ever had." Douglass opened with a one-under-par 70 to tie for the lead. He remained in the top ten after the next two rounds. In the final round, he shot even-par to finish T-4 and earn playing privileges.

=== PGA Tour ===
In 1980, Douglass played his rookie season on the PGA Tour. The first tournament he attempted to qualify for was the Phoenix Open. He was unsuccessful. The following week, he qualified for his first tournament, the Andy Williams-San Diego Open Invitational. Three weeks later, he made his first cut at the Joe Garagiola-Tucson Open. However, Douglass did not immediately build on this success, struggling in the early part of the season. The week after Tucson he played the Glen Campbell-Los Angeles Open. He shot rounds of 78 and missed the cut by a wide margin. The following week he played, the Bay Hill Classic at Bay Hill Club and Lodge. He opened with an 85, the second worst round of the day. He ultimately missed the cut by 15 strokes. He later described Bay Hill as the "toughest course I've ever played." In April, he played the Magnolia Classic in Hattiesburg, Mississippi. Douglass opened with a 69 to put him near the top ten. In the second round, Douglass shot "a three-under-par 32 on the front side" to approach the lead. However, in the middle of the round there was thunder and lightning. The round was ultimately cancelled. Douglass's good score was expunged. Two weeks later, he played the Greater New Orleans Open. Douglass opened with a 69 to approach the lead. However, he failed to break par for the remainder of the tournament and finished well down. In June, he played Atlanta Classic. Douglass opened with rounds of 71 and 73 to make the cut on the number. He shot a third round 69 (−3) to move near the top 25. Douglass closed with a 77, though, to finish T-60. In the summer, Douglass attributed his weak play to putting issues. "It's been very, very discouraging," he said. "The main problem has been erratic putting." In July, he played the Sammy Davis Jr.-Greater Hartford Open. In the first round, Douglass "limped home" with a 74. In the second round, however, Douglass shot a five-under-par 66, "the lowest of his rookie season," to make the cut on the number. On Saturday, he actually improved on this play, recording a "stunning" round. Douglass birdied nine of the last 12 holes for a 63 (−8). He briefly tied for the lead. The tournament, however, concluded "on a somewhat disconcerting note." Douglass' bogeyed the final hole for a one-over-par 72. Though he was near the lead for much of the weekend he finished outside the top 20. The following week, at the IVB-Golf Classic in Philadelphia, Douglass' missed the cut by a stroke. In September, he earned a sponsor's exemption to his hometown tournament, the Pleasant Valley Jimmy Fund Classic. However, Douglass was unable to take advantage, missing the cut. He ultimately finished the season at #185 on the money list, well outside of the threshold to earn membership. Douglass later described it as "a very bad year." However, late in the season Douglass played excellently at Fall 1980 PGA Tour Qualifying School. At finals, held at Fort Washington Country Club in Fresno, California, he earned "a wire-to-wire victory" defeating the nearest competitor by seven shots. According to The Fresno Bee, it was "some of the most awesome golf ever seen in Fresno." Douglass "gained his playing privileges for the second time."

Douglass played his second season on the PGA Tour in 1981. At his first event, the Joe Garagiola-Tucson Open, he failed to qualify. Shortly before his next event, the Phoenix Open, he received a new set of Ping irons from Karsten Solheim, the founder of the company. This reinvigorated his game. At Phoenix, Douglass made his first cut of the year. At his second tournament, Bing Crosby National Pro-Am, Douglass birdied three of the last five holes to make the cut on the number. By virtue of making the cut at Pebble Beach he automatically qualified for the following tournament, the Wickes-Andy Williams San Diego Open. He played well in San Diego, finishing in a tie for 19th place. The following week, he played the Hawaiian Open. Douglass shot a second round 66 to get into a tie with Tom Watson and Hale Irwin for second place, two back of leader Nick Faldo. Douglass shot under-par in the final two rounds to finish T-12. He ultimately made six cuts in a row. His good play got him into the Players Championship for the first time. He made the cut. In April, he received an invitation to Memorial Tournament. He was one of only a handful of golfers to receive a special invitation from the host, Jack Nicklaus. In June, he was in contention at a couple of events for a short time. At the Atlanta Classic, he shot a third round 69 (−3) to briefly break into the top ten. The following week, at the Westchester Classic, Douglass opened with a three-under-par 68 to take the clubhouse lead. Entering the final round, he was still in contention, one out of the top ten. Shortly thereafter, however, the season went "downhill" for Douglass. In July, he missed the cut at the Western Open. Later in the month, he missed the cut at the Quad Cities Open. Putting remained his key shortcoming. "My putter had gone sour the last 3 1/2 weeks," Douglass said. "I was getting mad all the time and my anger didn't help at all." Late in July, he played better at the qualifier for the Anheuser-Busch Golf Classic. He was the medalist at the event. However, Douglass shot 76 and 78 at the event proper and missed the cut by a wide margin. In the seven events entering the Pleasant Valley Jimmy Fund Classic he had failed to qualify or missed the cut in all of them. At Pleasant Valley, however, he "surged into contention" with a third round 69. The good play was ephemeral, though, as he shot several over-par in the final round to finish outside the top 25. Douglass made his last five cuts of the year but without any high finishes finished well outside the top 60 threshold to earn membership.

The following season, in 1982, would be his final full year on the PGA Tour. Early in the season, Douglass had a reasonable amount of success. At the Hawaiian Open he closed with rounds of 69 to finish T-16. Douglass made the cut at the next tournament, the Glen Campbell-Los Angeles Open. The following week he made the cut at the Doral-Eastern Open. By virtue of making the cut, he qualified for the next tournament, Bay Hill Classic. His following tournament was the tour's flagship event, The Players Championship. In the second round, Douglass recorded a three-under-par 69, one of the rounds of the day, to make the cut and move into the top 25. He was in the top 100 of the money list at this point, within the threshold to earn membership. In April, he played the Magnolia Classic. The event was held at Hattiesburg Country Club in Hattiesburg, Mississippi. Douglass opened with rounds of 69 and 68 to put him in contention, five back of Payne Stewart's lead. In the third round Douglass "blistered" the course, shooting a record-tying 63 (−7). He held a three shot lead over a number of players, including Stewart. It was his first 54-hole lead on the PGA Tour. "I've never been leading a golf tournament, so this is kind of new for me," he told reporters after the round. On Sunday, Douglass played with Stewart in the final group. Stewart birdied the 6th hole to cut the lead to two. Then there were birdie-bogey exchanges on the 7th and 8th holes; Stewart suddenly had a two-stroke lead. "It was pretty much downhill from there," Douglass later said. Douglass then missed a one-foot par putt on the 10th and bogeyed the following hole too. He did not make a birdie on the way in. He ultimately shot a three-over-par 73 to finish joint second, three back of champion Stewart. For the remainder of the season, Douglass played much worse. He missed the cut or failed to qualify for his next five events. In late June, he made the cut at the Manufacturers Hanover Westchester Classic. However, he missed the cut at his next two events, the Western Open and the Greater Milwaukee Open. By mid-July, according to The Boston Globe, Douglass was becoming "dangerously close to falling out of the PGA Tour's top 125 in money winnings which is the qualifying requirement for next year's all-exempt tour." In the middle of the summer, however, he was briefly in contention at two events. In late July, at the Anheuser-Busch Golf Classic, he opened with a 67 (−4) to put him in solo fourth, two back of Bruce Lietzke. Douglass shot over-par in the second round but remained the top ten. However, he closed with a ten-over-par 81 to finish in last place. The following week, Douglass played the Canadian Open. He opened with a four-under-par 67 to tie Greg Norman and Brad Bryant for the lead. However, over the weekend Douglass concluded with rounds of 74 and 80 to finish T-66. Over his next seven events, Douglass missed the cut or failed to qualify for in five of them. Entering the final event, the Walt Disney World Golf Classic, he was outside the top 125 on the money list had to earn at least $6,500 to earn membership for the following season. Douglass did not come close to this metric; he only earned $836 at the event. In November, he participated in 1982 PGA Tour Qualifying School at TPC Sawgrass. Douglass played poorly, failing to break 75 in the tournament. He did not qualify for the PGA Tour or its offshoot tour, the Tournament Players' Series. Douglass played a handful of tour events in 1983 but did not do anything of note. "After three years of frustration" he decided to retire from the PGA Tour.

=== Club professional ===
In 1984, Douglass retired from the career of a touring professional to work as a club professional. In April, he began work as an assistant professional at Winged Foot Golf Club. It was considered one of the "most prestigious assistantships" in the country. He also noted that he aspired to be "a head pro some day in the Metropolitan PGA section." During the era, he played a number of significant events in this free time too. In May, he qualified for the local PGA Tour event, the Westchester Classic. With a second round 68, Douglass made the cut. During the era, he attempted to qualify for the 1984 U.S. Open. The event would be held at his home club, Winged Foot. He was unsuccessful at sectional qualifying though. Before the 3rd round of the event proper, however, while he was opening up the pro shop, he was abruptly notified that he could play as a marker for Scott Simpson who was playing without a partner. Douglass decided to play with Simpson and outplayed him, shooting a three-over-par 73. Late in the month, at the Massachusetts Open, Douglass shot a final round 69 (−3), "the round of the tournament," to finish joint second. He earned $2,500. Later in the summer, Douglass had much success at a number of local Met PGA events. In July, he played the Metropolitan Insurance Pro-Junior better-ball tournament with partner Mark Loomis. The pair finished joint runner-up. In July, he attempted to qualify for the Westchester Open. He was successful, earning medalist honors. At the event proper, Douglass birdied seven of the first 12 holes during the final round to take the lead. Meanwhile, a birdie on the par-4 18th hole "proved to be the difference." Douglass won by one. In September, Douglass played the Met PGA Assistants Championship. He finished joint third place. In late September, he played the Assistant PGA Professional Championship at his boyhood course, Thorny Lea Golf Club in Brockton, Massachusetts. He finished in solo sixth place, eight behind champion Fred Funk.

In 1985, Douglass had much success on the Met PGA. In April, he played the Met section's inaugural event, the Metropolitan PGA Pro-Am Bestball of Four. Douglass shot a "blistering" four-under-par 67 to win the individual division while his team won the pro-am. Days later, he played the Met PGA's Pro-Assistant Championship, paired with Winged Foot head pro Tom Nieporte. The pair finished in the top five. In July, Douglass played the three-round New York State Open at Grossinger's Country Club in Liberty, New York. In the second round, he fired a six-under-par 65 which "catapulted him into contention." He tied the course record and moved into joint third place, three back of leader Jim Thorpe. In the final round, Douglass "turned in a creditable card" with one-under-par 70 but it was not enough. He finished where he started the day, in joint third. In August, he played the Metropolitan Open. At the pro-am, Douglass "scorched the back nine" leading to a 66 (−5) to win the individual division of the event. In addition, he led his pro-am team to an outright win. Douglass maintained his good play the following day. In the first round, he recorded "the shot of the day," a hole out at the 13th hole for eagle. This led to a two-under-par 69 and solo second place start, one back of leader Gene Borek. He continued with good play the following day, recording another 69 to take a two shot lead over Borek and David Glenz. In the final round, however, "difficult pin placements took their toll on the leaders" including Douglass. He shot a three-over-par 74 to finish to solo second, two behind champion George Zahringer. Because the champion, Zahringer, was an amateur Douglass was able to collect the first prize cheque though. In September, he played the Met PGA Pro-Pro Championship. With rounds of 66 and 71, the pair finished one back, in solo second. In October, he played the Met PGA Assistants tournament at Birchwood Country Club in Westport, Connecticut. Douglass was the only player to match par and won, defeating Bob Miller and Jim O'Mara by a stroke. With the victory, Douglass secured the Met PGA's Assistant's Player of the Year award.

In early 1986, however, Douglass made a "stunning announcement." He decided to resign from Winged Foot and started work as an investment banking executive for Morgan Stanley. According to the Mount Vernon Argus, it was considered a particularly stunning decision because Douglass was an assistant at one of the top clubs in the country and "seemed headed for a lucrative head spot." Douglass referred to the career change as a "tough decision" but also "a 'one in a million' opportunity" that he could not pass up. In the ensuing years, Douglass was still tangentially involved with the golf industry, playing the minitours and working as a golf coach. In 1987, he played a minitour in Mexico, the International Players Association. In February, at an event in Ensenada, Douglass tied for fifth with Antonio Garrido, a European Tour pro, three back. In May, Douglass won the circuit's stop in Guadalajara, earning $22,000. In August, in an event in Mexicali, Douglass tied for fourth with José María Cañizares, another European Tour pro. Douglass beat PGA Tour pros like Rafael Alarcón and Tom Purtzer. During this era, Douglass also worked as the informal instructor of Geoffrey Sisk, a college golfer. Sisk was also from Massachusetts and would move on to the PGA Tour as well. "My game was just deteriorating," Sisk told The Boston Globe. "But thanks to Bruce Douglass, I think my game has turned around."

== Personal life ==
In early 1981, Douglass got engaged to Kelly Merten. In November, they were married. His wife was also a professional golfer.

His sister-in-law, Lauri Merten, was also a professional golfer.

== Awards and honors ==
- In 1975, Douglass was awarded Murray State's Most Valuable Player (MVP) in golf.
- In 1976, Douglass won the Richard D. Haskell Award, bestowed to the Massachusetts Golfer of the Year.
- In 1985, Douglass won the Metropolitan PGA Section's Assistant's Player of the Year award.

== Amateur wins ==
- 1974 Murray State Invitational, LSU Invitational
- 1975 University of Kentucky Intercollegiate, University of Kentucky Invitational, Tennessee Tech Spring Intercollegiate Golf Tournament, Massachusetts Amateur
- 1976 Massachusetts Amateur, Francis Ouimet Memorial

== Professional wins (7) ==
=== National Golfers of America Tour (1) ===
- 1979 Los Cerannos tournament

=== International Players Association Tour (1) ===
- 1987 Guadalajara tournament

=== Met PGA Section wins (3) ===
- 1984 Westchester Open
- 1985 Metropolitan PGA Pro-Am Bestball of Four, Met PGA Assistants tournament

=== Other wins (2) ===
- 1977 Greater Bangor Open
- 1985 Cardinal Shehan Pro-Am

== Results in major championships ==
| Tournament | 1976 |
|---|---|
| U.S. Open | T62 |

== Results in the Players Championship ==
| Tournament | 1981 | 1982 |
|---|---|---|
| The Players Championship | 71 | T41 |

== Team appearances ==
Amateur

Tri-State Golf Matches (representing Massachusetts): 1976

== See also ==
- Fall 1979 PGA Tour Qualifying School graduates
- Fall 1980 PGA Tour Qualifying School graduates
