= Jeff Lewis (golfer) =

American professional golfer (born 1953)

Personal information
- Full name: Jeffrey Craig Lewis
- Nicknames: "King of the Mini-tours," "Mr. Mini-tour"
- Nationality: United States
- Born: October 25, 1953 (age 73) Lawrence, Massachusetts, U.S.
- Height: 6 ft 0 in (183 cm)
- Weight: 180
- Children: 1

Career
- Sport: Golf
- College: Franklin College
- Turned professional: 1976
- Former tours: Asia Golf Circuit; PGA Tour; Canadian Tour
- Professional wins: at least 69

Best results in major championships
- Masters Tournament: DNP
- PGA Championship: DNP
- U.S. Open: CUT: 1984, 1986
- The Open Championship: DNP

Achievements and awards
- North Atlantic Tour money list winner: 1995

Jeffrey Craig Lewis (born October 25, 1953) is an American professional golfer. In his youth, Lewis originally intended on becoming a doctor and did not take the game of golf very seriously. However, in the middle of his studies at Franklin College, he switched career paths and decided to become a professional golfer. Late in college, Lewis had much success as an amateur golfer, culminating with a runner-up finish at the NAIA tournament. Shortly thereafter, Lewis turned pro and had good results, winning a number of state opens across New England. In 1986, at the age of 33, Lewis earned his PGA Tour card but only maintained membership for two years. For the remainder of his career, Lewis primarily played on mini-tours in Florida and the Northeast with extraordinary success, ultimately earning the moniker "King of the Mini-tours" by The Boston Globe.

== Early life ==
Lewis was born in Lawrence, Massachusetts. However, he was raised in Sandwich, Massachusetts, on Cape Cod. He is one of five children. His father was Dr. John H. Lewis. Lewis started playing golf as a child. He began playing the game at White Cliffs Country Club in Plymouth, Massachusetts. He met Allan Stewart, the local pro, who served as his mentor throughout his career. "He's been like a second father to me," he later said. Lewis notes that he was "good at a young age." However, in his teens the quality of his play decelerated. "From 12 until 20, I was average," he later said.

Lewis attended Sandwich High School. He also played on the high school's golf team. Despite being an "average" golfer during this era he had some highlights. At the end of his senior year, Lewis attempted to qualify for Massachusetts' annual schoolboy golf Individual Championship. At his site, which was held at his home course of Pocasset Golf Course in Bourne, Massachusetts, Lewis overcame "the heavy winds" to shoot a 77 to earn medalist honors. The tournament proper was held at Saddle Hill Country Club in Hopkinton, Massachusetts. Playing against the top high school golfers in the state, Lewis opened with a 69 to take the lead. Shortly thereafter, Lewis graduated from high school. In the summer, Lewis played the Catholic Youth Organization (CYO) tournament in the intermediate division. Lewis won his first three matches. He faced Ray Odell of Needham, Massachusetts, in the finals. According to The Boston Globe, among all the divisional finalists, "[p]robably the best round of the morning was turned in by Lewis." Lewis was three-under-par through 15 holes and won it, 2 & 1.

== Amateur career ==
Lewis attended university at Franklin College in Franklin, Indiana. Lewis entered as a pre-med student with the intention of becoming a doctor and taking over the family business. He also played on the golf team. In the fall of 1972, Lewis returned to Franklin for his sophomore year. During the year, he elected to withdraw from his pre-med program. Lewis decided to stay in school, however, and continued to play on the golf team. Around this time, Lewis began taking his golf game more seriously. During his junior and senior years, Lewis began receiving renown for his play. In April 1974, during the end of his junior year, Franklin played the DePauw Invitational at Windy Hills Country Club. Lewis birdied the final two holes to record a three-under-par 67, defeating the runner-up by four strokes. The Daily Journal noted that, "It was the best round ever shot by a Franklin golfer in a tournament." Days later, Lewis fired a three-under-par 68, leading to a victory over Earlham College. At the end of his senior year, Lewis played the National Association of Intercollegiate Athletics (NAIA) golf tournament. The tournament was hosted by Texas Wesleyan University in Fort Worth, Texas. Playing against 164 golfers, Lewis finished in joint second place, one back of the champion. In late May, he graduated from Franklin.

In the summer of 1975, Lewis decided to play "the amateur golf circuit" in New England. He continued to practice full time in an effort to become a professional golfer. According to The Republican, during this era he was referred to as "one of the state's top amateurs." In June, Lewis played the Northeast Amateur held at Wannamoisett Country Club in Rumford, Rhode Island. The tournament possessed an elite amateur field including Curtis Strange, Andy Bean, and Bob Byman. In the second round, playing against "[g]usty winds," Lewis was the only player to match par and moved into contention. He ultimately finished in the top five. Days later, Lewis began play at the Massachusetts Open. Lewis was in contention the whole tournament and ultimately finished joint second, two back. In August, he won the Governor's Cup, a pairs event, with teammate John Sances. In the winter of 1975–76, Lewis moved to Florida in an effort to improve his game. Around this time he was thinking about turning professional. By the spring he had returned to Massachusetts. In June 1976, Lewis attempted to qualify for the Massachusetts Amateur. At Woods Hole Golf Club, Lewis shot consecutive rounds of 71 to earn medalist honors, defeating Peter Teravainen by five. It also tied for the lowest scores among all players at all sites. He reached the third round of the tournament proper.

== Professional career ==
In July 1976, Lewis turned professional. By his own admission, he "did not have a fast start as a pro." Lewis' first professional tournament was the New Hampshire Open. He finished outside the top ten. Days later, Lewis began play at the Greater Bangor Open. He was never on contention and finished T-23. At his following tournament, the Maine Open, he played better, recording a top five. In early 1977, he returned to Florida, this time to play on the mini-tours, including the Space Coast Tour. By the summer, he had returned to New England. In August, he played the Maine Open again. He failed to match par in the first two rounds and only made the cut on the number. He finished T-55. In May 1978, Lewis attempted to qualify for the U.S. Open. At the two-round qualifier, he recorded 154 strokes and missed the cut-off by four strokes. Lewis later said, "I had no business being there." In June, he played the three-round Massachusetts Open. Lewis opened with an even-par round to put him only two off the lead. However, he followed with a five-over-par 77 to fall out of contention. He then concluded the tournament with an 88 to finish in last place among those that made the cut.

In 1979, however, Lewis had a sterling season, dominating local New England events. In June, he recorded a top five at the Vermont Open. The following week Lewis finished solo third at the Massachusetts Open. In July, he played some significant events in New Hampshire. On July 17, he played the inaugural Cold Spring Classic at White Mountain Country Club in Ashland, New Hampshire. He shot four-under-par 68 to break the course record and win by one. Later in the summer, he recorded runner-up finishes at the New Hampshire Open and Rhode Island Open. By now he was "the leading money-winner on the New England pro circuit." In August, he played the three-round Maine Open. In the second round, Lewis shot a four-under-par 68 to take the solo lead. Despite an erratic final round, Lewis birdied the 16th hole to secure the win. He defeated three golfers by a stroke. He earned $1,500. He ultimately won the money list for "the New England professional golf circuit."

In the early 1980s, Lewis continued with "slow but steady progress." In the spring of 1980, however, he "suffered a torn ligament in his left hand." Partially due to this affliction he had a "disappointing summer." In June, he played the Massachusetts Open. Lewis closed with a 77 to fall out of contention. In July, he began play at the Greater Bangor Open. At the pro-am, Lewis shot a seven-under-par 65 to earn medalist honors. Lewis, however, "faltered" in the tournament proper. On August 12, Lewis played the one-round Hampden Open in Hampden, Massachusetts. At the end of regulation, Lewis was tied with Ken Diskin and Peter Teravainen. On the first hole of a sudden-death playoff, despite "a sort of comedy of errors," Lewis won with a bogey. By now he had "fully recovered from his injuries." Days later, at the Maine Open he recorded a top five finish. Shortly thereafter, he began playing on the Old Colony Bank mini-tour, a Cape Cod-located mini-tour he founded the previous year. In October, Lewis finished joint runner-up in a tour event. In general, the tour was known for its success. In 1981, he began playing extensively on the mini-tours in Florida as well. In early September, he won an event on the Tournament Golfers Association (TGA). He earned $1,000. The following day, on September 4, he earned "low pro honors" at the Jim Dent–Frank Hampton Open. In March 1982, Lewis played the California Country Club Pro-am in California Country Club in North Miami Beach, Florida. The professional portion of the event possessed a strong field, which included PGA Tour pros like Scott Hoch, Jerry Pate, and Hal Sutton. Lewis shot a seven-under-par 65 to win the event by two over Bob Eastwood, Sutton, and Bill Britton. His 65 also broke the course record previously set by Jerry Heard. In August, he won the Greater Bangor Open by five strokes over Jeff Sluman and Fran Marello. He earned $2,500. During the era, The Lewiston Daily Sun referred to him as "one of the most talented golfers to come out of New England in the past 20 years."

=== Asia Golf Circuit ===
In the mid-1980s, Lewis played on the Asia Golf Circuit. In 1983, he played on the circuit for three months. In February, he played the Philippine Open, the first of the season. At the pro-am, Lewis shot a seven-under-par 65 to earn medalist honors. He broke the course record. At the Malaysian Open, in March, he shot a "sizzling" 67 to move into the top five. He finished in the top ten. The following week, he recorded a top 15 finish at the Singapore Open. Lewis ultimately finished 19th on the circuit's money list. In early 1984, Lewis committed to the Asia Golf Circuit for another season. In March, he recorded a joint third-place finish at the Thailand Open. After the first four events he was in fifth place on the Order of Merit. At the fifth event, the Singapore Open, Lewis recorded joint sixth-place finish. He finished in 9th place on the Order of Merit. In 1985, he played the Asia Golf Circuit for the final time. In March, he played the Singapore Open. Lewis finished solo third, four out of a playoff between T.M. Chen and Greg Turner. He ultimately finished 10th on the money list. Lewis appreciated his time on the Asian circuit and felt it prepared him for the PGA Tour. "Being on the Asian golf tour has given me a lot of needed experience," he later said. "I now feel that I can go after my PGA tour card."

=== PGA Tour ===
As the spring of 1985, Lewis had returned to the United States. He continued to play the mini-tours and state opens in preparation for PGA Tour Qualifying school. In May, he quickly won an event on the Space Coast Tour. In June, Lewis played the two-round Vermont Open. He opened with a three-under-par 67 to put him in second place. In the final round, Lewis shot a one-over-par 71; however, most of his contenders failed to match par and he secured a one-shot win. In July, Lewis was solo runner-up at the Florida Open and Rhode Island Open only behind, respectively, PGA Tour pros John Huston and Brad Faxon. In August, he recorded a wire-to-wire win at the Greater Bangor Open. His rounds of 66-67-70 were the best rounds each day. The following week, Lewis recorded another wire-to-wire win, this time at the Maine Open. It was his second straight six shot win. He earned $2,400. By now, he had exceeded $57,000 in earnings over the course of the year. Late in the year, Lewis attended regionals for PGA Tour Qualifying school. Lewis opened with a "red hot" 64 to take a three shot lead. He ultimately finished in solo third to easily move on. Finals for 1986 PGA Tour Qualifying School were six rounds long and held at Haines City, Florida. Lewis would be competing against 162 players. Lewis finished at 431 (+2), in a tie for 30th place, to qualify for the PGA Tour.

In 1986 and 1987, Lewis played on the PGA Tour. Through the first 13 events, Lewis made the cut the majority of the time but recorded no top-25s. He was at 161st on the money list at this point. Despite the mediocre play Lewis was optimistic. In June, he talked to The Boston Globe. "It was hard not being able to play in the beginning of the year," he said. "Now I'm starting to play more, and I'm more acclimated to the life out here." He intended to play the next seven events. At these seven events, however, Lewis only made the cut twice. "I'm very dissatisfied," he told the Globe. In early September, he played his hometown event, the Bank of Boston Classic. Lewis shot rounds of 81 and 75 to miss the cut by a wide margin. He later described it as "the most disappointing week of all." At his final six events, Lewis only made the cut twice. He finished 178th on the money list, well outside the top 125 threshold to maintain his card. At 1986 PGA Tour Qualifying School, however, Lewis was successful, playing well under pressure, shooting a final round four-under-par 68 to make the cut-off by five shots. In 1987, though, Lewis again "struggled" on the PGA Tour. However, at his fourth tournament, the Los Angeles Open, Lewis temporarily played better. He opened excellently, shooting with a four-under-par 67 to put himself in joint second, one back. That night, he was invited by his sponsor, Hugh Hefner, to spend time at the Playboy Mansion. Lewis spent the whole night there; he was unable to sleep. He made his tee time the following day but, suffering from fatigue, shot an 81 and missed the cut. Lewis' poor play continued. Over his next 17 events, Lewis missed the cut 13 times. In September, he played his hometown event, the Bank of Boston Classic. Lewis birdied three of the final four holes to finish T-15. It was the best finish of his PGA Tour career. In his final six events, however, he finished the season poorly, failing to make a cut. He finished 183rd on the money list, well outside the cut-off. In December, he played 1987 PGA Tour Qualifying School. In the middle of the tournament, however, he withdrew. Lewis "lost his PGA Tour card." Lewis later testified to The Boston Globe: "I got caught up in the glamour, the prestige of being on the Tour, the girls out there and the whole awe and specter of the Tour."

=== Return to mini-tours ===
In 1988, Lewis was forced to return to play the mini-tours but, despite the demotion, Lewis had extraordinary success and won many events. In March 1988, he won a Space Coast Tour event at Wedgewood Country Club in Lakewood, Florida. Late in the month, Lewis won another Space Coast event in Orlando, Florida. In April, he played a Space Coast Tour event in West Orange, Florida. In the first round, he shot a 62 to take a five shot lead over Rocky Walcher. He followed with a 67 to win by eight. In June, he won a Florida Tour event at Walt Disney World. He earned $1,600. In June, he won another event on tour. The following week, he played the three-round Massachusetts Open. In the second round he shot a bogey-free 68 (−4) to tie Chip Johnson for the lead. In the final round, the 17th was the pivotal hole. Lewis made a challenging 18-foot birdie putt to take a one stroke lead. He held on and defeated Johnson and Bob Lendzion by a shot. It was his seventh win in 11 weeks. In July, Lewis returned to the Florida Tour for an event at Seville Golf and Country Club. At 145 (+1), he defeated Scott Dunlap and Mike Brisky by a shot. It was his third straight win on the Florida Tour. The Tampa Bay Times referred to him as "the hottest player on the tour." In September, he won another Space Coast Tour event. In November, he played the Jamaica Open. Lewis "dropped a long putt on the final hole" to defeat Seymour Rose by a shot. "The best thing that happened was losing my card," Lewis later told The Boston Globe, elated with his success since leaving tour.

=== Canadian Tour ===
In 1989, Lewis primarily played on the Canadian Tour. He earned an exemption by virtue of his victory at the Jamaica Open the previous year. Lewis did not begin the season well, however. The first tournament of the season was the Payless-Pepsi Victoria Open. He opened with a 75 and was not among the players who made the cut. The following week he played the British Columbia Open at Point Grey Golf Course. In the pro-am, Lewis shot a seven-under-par 64 to earn medalist honors. He was just one off the course record. At the tournament proper, however, Lewis barely made the cut and finished T-39th. The following week, at the Alberta Open, Lewis opened poorly with a 75. In the second round, he "incurred a foot injury" and withdrew. At this point Lewis had only earned $740 for the season. He was at 64th on the money list. Lewis was disappointed with his play. "I was one of the new Americans who was supposed to be a big success on this tour," he said. "I was feeling guilty." The fourth tournament was the Fort McMurray Rotary Charity Classic. Lewis had much more success at this event. After his third round Lewis was one of the early clubhouse leaders; he remained near the lead, two back after the completion of the round. During the final day, Lewis opened strong to take the lead. He played erratically in the middle of the round but birdied the 15th and 16th holes to assure a playoff with John Morse, his playing partner. On the third hole of the sudden-death playoff, played on the par-5 third hole, Lewis "hit one of the finest shots of his 10-year career." It was a bunker shot to three feet that assured birdie and the win. Lewis earned $12,000 for his victory. He moved into the top ten of the money list. He also earned multiple top 15 finishes later in the season. Lewis ultimately finished 15th on the money list. It was considered a "successful stint on the Canadian Tour" by The Boston Globe.

=== Late career ===
In the early 1990s Lewis continued with success, winning a number of significant regional events in New England. In July 1990, he defeated Fran Quinn on the fourth hole of a sudden-death playoff to win the New Hampshire Open. In the summer of 1991, Lewis went "on a roll." In June, he played the Vermont Open. Lewis opened with a six-under-par 64 to put him one of the lead. In the final round, Lewis eagled the par-5 2nd hole to take a two-shot lead. Brett Quigley, a newly turned pro, put up a strong fight. However, Lewis birdied to the final hole to punctuate a 67 (−3) and a two shot win over Quigley. In July, Lewis played a North Atlantic Tour event. The event was two rounds long and held at the Country Club of New Hampshire. In the first round, Lewis shot a 66, breaking the course record. He matched his own course record in the final round, defeating Pat Bates by five. Lewis was ecstatic with his play. "I would have taken on anybody in the world," he said days later. In August, he won again the North Atlantic Tour, defeating Jeff Julian by one. In late August, he played the one-round Spalding Western Massachusetts Open. Lewis shot a six-under-par 66 to break the course record and win. He earned $2,000. In September, he played the New England Open. Lewis made a "dramatic" birdie putt on the final hole for a one-stroke win. He earned $6,000. He now had earned $75,000 over the course of the year. During the era, Lewis was receiving extensive media coverage, being profiled in notable publications for his play. The Orlando Sentinel ran an article about him. The Boston Globe published a full-length profile about him entitled "Big Winner of Small Tournaments."

For the remainder of his career, injuries disrupted Lewis' game though he often played very well. In early 1992, he suffered "an arm injury." According to the Transcript-Telegram, "Lewis had not played much" through the beginning of the year. By July, however, he had returned to golf. He started playing on the Tommy Armour Tour and North Atlantic Tour. In 1993, Lewis started winning events again. In February, Lewis won an event on the North Florida Section PGA Winter Tour. "This was a big win for me," Lewis said after the event. In May, he won an event on the Tommy Armour Tour at Clermont, Florida by eight shots. In the summer, he won a number of events on the North Atlantic Tour. In September, he won the New England Open for the third time. By the fall, he returned to play in the southeast. In October, he won the Bermuda Open. Late in the year, he won on the Space Coast Tour and South Florida Golf Tour. In the mid-1990s, the injuries renewed, however. Early in 1994, he incurred neck injuries from a car crash. He was also suffering from rheumatoid arthritis during this era. Lewis did not have much success early in the season. Late in the Floridian mini-tour season he had some success, however, finishing runner-up at two South Florida Golf Tour events. In the summer, he began winning again, recording a number of victories at North Atlantic Tour events. In late September, he referred to himself as "80 percent" better from the car accident. In 1995, Lewis had another extraordinary season on the North Atlantic Tour, winning six events. He also won the money list. In mid-1990s, however, Lewis was unable to play much as the rheumatoid arthritis issue renewed. The issue persisted for two years. In 1996, he ultimately missed all of the summer events in New England. "I really missed playing in New England last year," he said. "The arthritis made it tough to get out of bed at times... It was frustrating." In late 1997, he attempted to play more. He got medication for his arthritis which improved his condition. In January 1999, he won consecutive events on the Players Tour, a mini-tour in Florida, his first wins in years. In the late winter and early spring, he continued with success, ultimately recording seven consecutive runner-up finishes on the mini-tours. In April, he finally won an event, this time on the BE. Golf Tour. In late 1999, despite the recent good play, Lewis intended to temporarily quit professional golf.

In 2000, Lewis got a job at a travel company, Travel Bridge Resort. He was taking a "sabbatical from golf." Lewis intended to work for the company for 18 months. He wanted stability and financial security, something he never had as his career as a golfer. In addition, he felt he could not compete with the younger generation of players in professional golf. "It's not that I've lost that much, it's that everyone else has gotten better," Lewis told The Cape Cod Times. He intended to return to golf in a few years to prepare himself for qualifying for the Senior PGA TOUR.

Lewis, however, did not renew his golf career. Lewis was featured in the media one more time in his career. In 2007, The Barnstable Patriot reported that he gave a speech at Cummaquid Golf Club in Cape Cod at the retirement ceremony for Allan Stewart. Stewart served as Lewis' mentor throughout his career going back to Lewis' childhood at White Cliffs Country Club in Plymouth, Massachusetts.

== Personal life ==
In the 1970s, Lewis married for the first time. However, in 1981, he and his wife divorced.

As of 1984, he had remarried to Debbie, a nurse. By the early 1990s, they were divorced. However, they formed an unusual arrangement where they decided to have a child together after the marriage. "We're on good terms," he told The Orlando Sentinel. "In fact we have such a good relationship that I gave her a son three weeks ago."

== Awards and honors ==
- Lewis earned the National Association of Intercollegiate Athletics' (NAIA) All-district 21 Golf Team honors his sophomore, junior, and senior years.
- By virtue of his runner-up performance at the year-end NAIA tournament, Lewis earned NAIA All-American team honors in 1975.
- In 1995, Lewis won the money list for the North Atlantic Tour.

== Amateur wins ==
- 1973 Taylor Invitational
- 1974 DePauw Invitational
- 1975 Franklin College Invitational

== Professional wins (69) ==
note: this list is incomplete

=== Canadian Tour wins (1) ===
No.	Date	Tournament	Winning score	Margin of victory	Runner-up
1	Jul 2, 1989	Fort McMurray Rotary Charity Classic	−10 (68-70-72-68=278)	Playoff	(United States) John Morse

=== Mini-tour wins (41) ===
==== Tournament Golfers Association wins (1) ====
- 1981 Rolling Hills event

==== Space Coast Tour wins (8) ====
- 1985 Tuskawilla event, South Grenelefe event
- 1988 Wedgewood Country Club event, Cypress Creek event, West Orange event, Indigo Lake event
- 1989 Walden Lake Golf Club event
- 1993 West Orange event

==== Florida Tour wins (3) ====
- 1988 Walt Disney World event, Poinciana event, Seville Golf and Country Club event

==== North Atlantic Tour wins (17) ====
note: this list is incomplete

- 1989 Keene, New Hampshire event
- 1990 Beverly Golf Club event
- 1991 Country Club of New Hampshire event, Shattuck Inn Country Club event
- 1993 Greater Springfield Open, Blackledge Country Club event, Bluebird Open
- 1994 Norwich Golf Club event, Norton Country Club event, Fort Devans Golf Course event, Shattuck Golf Club event, Crystal Springs Country Club event
- 1995 Applachin, New York event, Norton, Massachusetts event, Silver Cup, Lakeside Open, Upper Cape Open

==== North Florida PGA Winter Tour (3) ====
- 1989 Cypress Creek Country Club event, Poinciana, Florida event
- 1993 Pine Lakes Country Club event

==== Central Florida Tour wins (1) ====
- 1990 Marriot World Center event

==== U.S. Golf Tour wins (1) ====
- 1990 Greater Wilmington Open

==== Gold Coast Tour wins (1) ====
- 1991 Breakers West event

==== Tommy Armour Tour wins (1) ====
- 1993 Palisades Country Club event

==== South Florida Golf Tour wins (2) ====
- 1993 Pembroke Lakes Golf and Racquet Club event
- 1994 The Fall Championship

==== Players Tour wins (2) ====
- 1999 January event, February event

==== BE. Golf Tour wins (1) ====
- 1999 Palm Aire Country Club event

=== Other wins (27) ===
- 1975 Governor's Cup Invitational (with John Sances)
- 1979 Zeelwood Open, Cold Spring Classic, Maine Open
- 1980 Hampden Open
- 1981 Jim Dent–Frank Hampton Open
- 1982 California Country Club Pro-am, Miller High Life-Greater Bangor Open, Charles Chip Invitational Pro-Am
- 1983 Sebastian Municipal Golf Pro-Am, Grapefruit Golf Pro-Am
- 1984 The Rolling Hills Open, Sebastian Invitational Pro-am
- 1985 Vermont Open, Miller High Life-Greater Bangor Open, Maine Open
- 1988 Jamaica Open, Massachusetts Open
- 1989 New England Open, Dodger Pines Open
- 1990 New Hampshire Open
- 1991 Vermont Open, Spalding Western Massachusetts Open, New England Open
- 1993 New England Open
- 1994 Bermuda Open
- 1999 IKON Manchester Open

== Results in major championships ==
Tournament	1984	1985	1986
U.S. Open	CUT		CUT

Did not play

CUT = missed the halfway cut

== Team appearances ==
Tri-State Golf Matches (representing Massachusetts): 1975 (winners)

== See also ==
- 1985 PGA Tour Qualifying School graduates
- 1986 PGA Tour Qualifying School graduates
