= New England Classic (Nationwide Tour event) =

Golf tournament

Nike New England Classic
Tournament information
- Location: Falmouth, Maine
- Established: 1990
- Course: The Woodlands Club
- Par: 72
- Length: 6,848 yards (6,262 m)
- Tour: Nike Tour
- Format: Stroke play
- Prize fund: US$150,000
- Month played: June
- Final year: 1993

Tournament record score
- Aggregate: 278 John Morse (1993)
- To par: −10 as above

Final champion
- (United States) John Morse
- Location in the United States Location in Maine

The New England Classic was a golf tournament on the Nike Tour (formerly the Ben Hogan Tour). It ran from 1990 to 1993. It was played at The Woodlands Club in Falmouth, Maine, with its last winner, John Morse, earning $27,000 in winnings in 1993.

== Winners ==
Year	Winner	Score	To par	Margin of victory	Runner(s)-up	Ref.
Nike New England Classic
1993	(United States) John Morse	278	−10	4 strokes	(United States) Emlyn Aubrey (United States) Pete Jordan (United States) Sam Randolph (United States) Larry Silveira	
Ben Hogan New England Classic
1992	(United States) Greg Bruckner	208	−8	Playoff	(United States) Ed Kirby	
1991	(United States) Steve Haskins	207	−9	1 stroke	(United States) Jeff Gallagher	
1990	(United States) Brandel Chamblee	215	−1	1 stroke	(United States) Jeff Maggert	
