= Fall 1980 PGA Tour Qualifying School graduates =

This is a list of the Fall 1980 PGA Tour Qualifying School graduates.

== Tournament summary ==
The tournament was held at Fort Washington Golf Club in Fresno, California. Bruce Douglass opened with a 65 (−6) to take a two-stroke lead over a number of players, including Fred Couples. In the second round, Douglass shot a 69 to maintain the lead. In the third round, Douglass shot a 67 at the "difficult" course to take a seven-shot lead. In the final round, Douglass shot a one-under-par 70 to defeat runner-up Doug Black by seven strokes. In addition, he outplayed notable qualifiers like Mark O'Meara, Loren Roberts, and Fred Couples by several shots. Douglass "gained his playing privileges for the second time."

Peter Teravainen, who played on the PGA Tour the previous season, missed qualifying by one shot. The European Tour then gave membership to the top 15 players who failed to qualify at PGA Tour Qualifying School. Teravainen accepted membership.

== List of graduates ==
#	Player	Notes
1	(United States) Bruce Douglass	Winner of 1975 and 1976 Massachusetts Amateur
2	(United States) Doug Black	
T3	(United States) Jack Ferenz	
T3	(United States) Jeff Hewes	
T5	(United States) Jim Booros	
T5	(United States) Keith Lyford	
T5	(United States) Gary Trivisonno	
T5	(United States) Allan Strange	
T5	(United States) Ted Goin	
T5	(United States) Curtis Worley	
T11	(United States) Mark O'Meara	Winner of 1979 U.S. Amateur
T11	(United States) Tim Norris	
T13	(United States) Dan Frickley	
T13	(United States) Rod Nuckolls	
T15	(United States) John Mazza	
T15	(United States) Perry Arthur	
T15	(United States) Loren Roberts	
T15	(United States) Darrell Kestner	
T15	(United States) Don Levin	
T15	(United States) John Jacobs	
T21	(United States) Scott Stegner	
T21	(United States) Brent Murray	
T21	(United States) Richie Adham	
T21	(Canada) Bob Beauchemin	
T21	(United States) Fred Couples	Winner of 1978 Washington Open
T21	(United States) Thomas Gray	
T21	(United States) Jimmy Paschal	
