= Fort McMurray Rotary Charity Classic =

Golf tournament

Fort McMurray Charity Rotary Classic
Tournament information
- Location: Fort McMurray, Alberta, Canada
- Established: 1988
- Course: Miskanaw Golf Club
- Par: 72
- Length: 6,865 yards (6,277 m)
- Tour: Canadian Tour (only 1988–89)
- Format: Stroke play
- Prize fund: CA$50,000
- Month played: late June-early July
- Final year: 1990

Tournament record score
- Aggregate: 268 Louis Brown (1990)
- To par: −20 as above

Final champion
- (United States) Louis Brown

The Fort McMurray Rotary Charity Classic was a Canadian golf tournament. In the 1970s and 1980s, the town of Fort McMurray, Alberta, held a number of well-managed tournaments that attracted relatively strong fields. The local Rotary was impressed and decided to manage a full-length event, ultimately earning the sanction of the Canadian Tour. The first two events, held in 1988 and 1989, were generally successful with good attendance and international fields though fundraising was always a struggle and the second tournament actually lost money. Financial issues persisted as the 1990 event was unable to garner the prize money expected by the tour. The tournament continued for that year but lacked the tour's sanction. The event ceased operations thereafter.

== History ==
In November 1987, it was announced that a significant golf tournament would be held in Fort McMurray, Alberta. The local Rotary club took responsibility for organizing the event. Milt Hodgins, the chairman of the local Rotary International, stated that the Rotarians were motivated to hold the event "to raise funds for health related causes in Fort McMurray" and promote the town to a broader audience. The company Marlin Travel also made a "significant contribution." Lyle McRae, the president of the local Rotary, noted that the event is "destined to become the perennial highlight of summer golf activity in Fort McMurray." The event was held at Miskanaw Golf Course in Fort McMurray, Alberta. The event was expected to be the "highlight of the season" for Miskanaw Golf Course. It was also "the first major sporting event held in Fort McMurray."

There was good precedent to hold the event at Miskanaw GC. In the 1970s, the course hosted a significant pro-am featuring roughly two dozen top pros from around Canada. The purse was $17,500. In the 1985 and 1986, the course was the home to a skins game featuring PGA Tour pros Dave Barr and Dan Halldorson. In 1987, 35 players from the recently concluded Alberta Open played a pro-am at Miskanaw. The latter event was the primary impetus for the Charity Classic. "We were really impressed," said Tom Jackson, the medalist, immediately after the tournament. "We think there's a lot of possibility that this could be a part of the Canadian tour."

The Canadian Tour ultimately did sanction the event. Bob Beauchemin, executive director of the Canadian Tour's tournament players division, was instrumental in securing the tour's imprimatur. A "gentlemen's agreement" was devised concerning the overall length of the tournament; it was intended to last for at least three years. Over the winter of 1987−88, meanwhile, fundraising progressed. By April, the tournament had secured $43,000 of the expected $50,000 it needed for prize money; they ultimately met the threshold. The tournament would only be 54-holes long, however. Miskanaw GC was hesitant to rent out their property for more than that. American Kirk Triplett earned a wire-to-wire win. It was also his second consecutive win on the Canadian Tour; he was the first person since Dave Barr in 1977 to win consecutive events on tour.

In late 1988, tournament officials tried to persuade the Canadian PGA about lengthening the following year's tournament. "We want to talk to the CPGA and executive of the golf club about scheduling a longer tournament," said Milt Hodgins, the chairman of the Rotary and now the tournament chairman. "That's our ultimate goal: we want to be bigger and better." In October, it was confirmed that the tournament would be 72 holes long. Total prize money also increased to $60,000. They also decided to conclude the tournament on the weekend to increase attendance. National television coverage was also secured. Molson Brewery, one of the top brewing companies in Canada and in the world, agreed to sponsor the event. About 110 golfers from across the globe competed in the event. American Jeff Lewis, a former PGA Tour pro, defeated fellow American John Morse in a playoff. Despite these advances, the tournament was not successful financially, losing $10,000.

Despite the three year unwritten agreement, the existence of the tournament was in doubt for 1990. Inadequate fundraising efforts by the local Rotary club had undermined the future of the tournament. In addition, the Canadian Tour increased their threshold to host a tournament by $15,000. In April, however, Marlin Travel, a minor sponsor in previous years, agreed to be the lead sponsor. "I'm excited, I'm thrilled," said Milt Hodgins. "It's been very tense this year, let's face it. The financial side to an event of this size is always a struggle." The three-year commitment was honored. However, they were still beneath the $75,000 prize money metric set by the tour. Organizers desperately tried to reach this threshold. They sold "tee and green sponsorships at $500 apiece" and raised several thousand dollars. However, they were unable to reach the financial standards set by the tour; the tournament would go on but would not be certified by the Canadian Tour. At the tournament, Louis Brown, an American, shot 20-under-par to break the tournament record by ten strokes. He defeated David DeLong, a California native, by three strokes.

The intention was to hold the event in the future. After the event secured funding in 1990, Milt Hodgins, the tournament director, was optimistic. "I'm very pleased that the event is going to happen and hopefully for years to come," he told the Fort McMurray Today. For the ensuing years, there were plans to alternate the tournament between Miskanaw Golf Course and a new golf course being built in Fort McMurray, Alberta. However, there is no evidence that the event continued. The tournament was not on the Canadian Tour's calendar in 1991. Nor was the event on the calendar in subsequent years.

== Winners ==
Year	Winner	Score	Margin of victory	Runner(s)-up	Ref.
1988	(United States) Kirk Triplett	204 (−12)	3 strokes	(South Africa) Wayne Bradley	
1989	(United States) Jeff Lewis	278 (−10)	Playoff (Note: Lewis defeated Morse with a birdie on the third hole of a sudden-death playoff.)	(United States) John Morse	
1990	(United States) Louis Brown	268 (−20)	3 strokes	(United States) David DeLong	
