= 1986 PGA Tour Qualifying School graduates =

This is a list of the 1986 PGA Tour Qualifying School graduates. 53 players earned their 1987 PGA Tour card through Q-School in 1986. This was the first year that playing privileges went out to the top 50 and, in addition, those that tied for the top 50. The tournament was played over 108 holes at the PGA West Stadium Course, in La Quinta, California. Those earning cards split the $100,000 purse, with the winner earning $15,000.

Place	Player	Notes
1	(United States) Steve Jones	
2	(Australia) Steve Elkington	
T3	(United States) Rocco Mediate	
T3	(Wales) Philip Parkin	Winner of 1983 British Amateur
5	(United States) Tom Garner	
T6	(United States) Bill Britton	One runner-up finish on PGA Tour
T6	(United States) Doug Johnson	
T8	(United States) Loren Roberts	Winner of 1979 Foot-Joy PGA Assistant Professional Championship
T8	(United States) Don Shirey Jr.	
T8	(United States) Duffy Waldorf	
T11	(United States) Mark Brooks	
T11	(United States) Sam Randolph	Winner of 1985 U.S. Amateur
T13	(United States) Ray Barr Jr.	
T13	(United States) Jim Carter	
T13	(United States) Keith Clearwater	Winner of 1982 North and South Amateur
T13	(Canada) Philip Jonas	
T13	(United States) David Peoples	
T13	(United States) Ted Schulz	
T19	(United States) Brad Fabel	
T19	(United States) John Inman	Winner of 1984 Western Amateur
T19	(Canada) Ray Stewart	
T19	(United States) Jim Wilson	
T23	(United States) Perry Arthur	
T23	(United States) David Canipe	
T23	(Namibia) Trevor Dodds	
T23	(United States) John Horne	
T27	(United States) Mike Bender	
T27	(United States) Rick Dalpos	
T27	(United States) Dave Eichelberger	
T27	(United States) Ted K. Lehmann	
T27	(United States) Jeff Lewis	
T32	(United States) Jay Don Blake	Winner of 1980 NCAA Division I Championship (individual medalist)
T32	(United States) Vance Heafner	1 PGA Tour win
T32	(United States) Tim Norris	1 PGA Tour win
T32	(United States) Bill Sander	
T32	(United States) Mike Smith	
T32	(United States) Bruce Soulsby	
T32	(United States) Harry Taylor	
T39	(United States) Brad Greer	
T39	(United States) Denny Hepler	
T39	(United States) Gary Krueger	
T39	(United States) John McComish	
T39	(Japan) Aki Ohmachi	
T39	(United States) Kenny Perry	
T39	(United States) John Riegger	
T39	(United States) Robert Thompson	
T39	(United States) Robert Wrenn	1 Asia Golf Circuit win
48	(United States) David Hobby	
T49	(United States) Dewey Arnette	
T49	(United States) Ed Dougherty	Winner of 1985 PGA Club Professional Championship
T49	(Canada) Tony Grimes	
T49	(United States) Mike McGee	
T49	(Canada) Richard Zokol	Winner of 1981 Canadian Amateur Championship
