= 1989 Canadian Tour =

Golf tour season

1989 Canadian Tour season
- Duration: June 1, 1989 – September 10, 1989
- Number of official events: 12
- Most wins: (Canada) Jerry Anderson (2)
- Order of Merit: (Canada) Jerry Anderson

The 1989 Canadian Tour was the fourth season of the Canadian Tour, the main professional golf tour in Canada since it was formed in 1986.

== Schedule ==
The following table lists official events during the 1989 season.

Date	Tournament	Location	Purse (C$)	Winner (Note: The number in parentheses after each winner's name is the number of Canadian Tour events they had won up to and including that tournament.)	OWGR points
Jun 4	Payless-Pepsi Victoria Open	British Columbia	75,000	(United States) Kelly Gibson (1)	n/a
Jun 11	Canadian Airlines-George Williams B.C. Open	British Columbia	160,000	(Canada) Jim Rutledge (1)	n/a
Jun 18	Phoenix Sportswear Alberta Open	Alberta	75,000	(Canada) Frank Edmonds (2)	n/a
Jul 2	Fort McMurray Rotary Charity Classic	Alberta	60,000	(United States) Jeff Lewis (1)	n/a
Jul 16	Manitoba Open	Manitoba	100,000	(United States) Stuart Hendley (1)	n/a
Jul 23	Windsor Roseland Charity Classic	Ontario	60,000	(Canada) Jerry Anderson (2)	n/a
Jul 30	Blue Light Pro-Am	Ontario	60,000	(Canada) Brent Franklin (2)	n/a
Aug 6	Timex-Bic Ontario Open	Ontario	100,000	(United States) Michael Bradley (1)	n/a
Aug 20	CPGA Championship	Alberta	125,000	(Canada) Jean-Louis Lamarre (1)	4
Aug 27	Lactantia Quebec Open	Quebec	80,000	(United States) John Morse (1)	n/a
Sep 3	Perrier Atlantic Classic	Prince Edward Island	100,000	(United States) Guy Boros (1)	n/a
Sep 10	Canadian Tournament Players Championship	Ontario	200,000	(Canada) Jerry Anderson (3)	n/a

== Order of Merit ==
The Order of Merit was titled as the du Maurier Order of Merit and was based on prize money won during the season, calculated in Canadian dollars.

Position	Player	Prize money (C$)
1	(Canada) Jerry Anderson	63,655
2	(United States) John Morse	47,560
3	(Canada) Brent Franklin	47,315
4	(Canada) Jim Rutledge	45,137
5	(United States) Stuart Hendley	41,492
