= Stan Baluik =

Canadian ice hockey player and golfer

- Born: October 5, 1935 (age 89); Port Arthur, Ontario, Canada
- Height: 5 ft 8 in (173 cm)
- Weight: 160 lb (73 kg; 11 st 6 lb)
- Position: Centre
- Shot: Left
- Played for: Boston Bruins
- Playing career: 1954–1964

Stanley Baluik (also spelled Baliuk; born October 5, 1935) is a former Canadian ice hockey centre and professional golfer. He played in 7 games for the Boston Bruins in the NHL during the 1959-60 season, with the rest of his hockey career spent in various minor leagues.

== Hockey career ==
In hockey, Baluik played from 1954 to 1964 in the Ontario Hockey Association, Quebec Hockey League, Western Hockey League, American Hockey League, and National Hockey League. He won the Dudley "Red" Garrett Memorial Award as Rookie of the Year while playing with the Providence Reds of the AHL in 1959-60. He played in 7 games for the Boston Bruins in the NHL during the 1959-60 season.

== Golf career ==
In golf, Baluik turned professional in 1955 and was club pro at the Fort William Country Club in Fort William, Ontario during the hockey off-season. In 1963, he accepted a position at the Kirkbrae Country Club in Lincoln, Rhode Island where he continued working until retirement. He won several amateur and professional tournaments in Canada and New England, including the 1965 Vermont Open and the 1971 Rhode Island Open.

== Career statistics ==
=== Regular season and playoffs ===
			Regular season					Playoffs
Season	Team	League	GP	G	A	Pts	PIM	GP	G	A	Pts	PIM
1950–51	Fort William Canadiens	NOJHA	12	4	3	7	8	3	0	2	2	0
1951–52	Fort William Canadiens	NOJHA	30	25	14	39	39	—	—	—	—	—
1952–53	Fort William Canadiens	NOJHA	30	27	33	60	40	6	0	5	5	4
1952–53	Fort William Canadiens	M-Cup	—	—	—	—	—	2	1	0	1	0
1953–54	Fort William Canadiens	NOJHA	34	35	50	85	30	4	3	4	7	6
1953–54	Fort William Canadiens	M-Cup	—	—	—	—	—	13	7	7	14	8
1954–55	Kitchener Canucks	OHA	49	20	51	71	122	—	—	—	—	—
1954–55	Montreal Royals	QHL	2	0	0	0	0	—	—	—	—	—
1955–56	Kitchener Canucks	OHA	48	31	73	104	46	8	2	10	12	30
1956–57	Chicoutimi Sagueneens	QHL	68	16	20	36	36	10	1	3	4	12
1957–58	Vancouver Canucks	WHL	32	13	15	28	45	—	—	—	—	—
1957–58	Springfield Indians	AHL	5	2	0	2	8	—	—	—	—	—
1958–59	Vancouver Canucks	WHL	55	28	26	54	57	3	1	1	2	0
1959–60	Boston Bruins	NHL	7	0	0	0	2	—	—	—	—	—
1959–60	Providence Reds	AHL	65	23	57	80	60	5	2	3	5	2
1960–61	Providence Reds	AHL	71	26	37	63	67	—	—	—	—	—
1961–62	Providence Reds	AHL	69	25	56	81	55	3	1	0	1	6
1962–63	Providence Reds	AHL	72	23	58	81	52	6	2	3	5	4
1963–64	Providence Reds	AHL	65	27	41	68	55	3	1	2	3	4
AHL totals			347	126	249	375	297	17	6	8	14	16
NHL totals			7	0	0	0	2	—	—	—	—	—

== Tournament wins (2) ==
- 1965 Vermont Open
- 1971 Rhode Island Open
