= Vermont Open =

U.S. state open golf tournament

The Vermont Open is the Vermont state open golf tournament, open to both amateur and professional golfers. It is organized by the Vermont Golf Association. It was previously organized by the Vermont Chapter of the New England section of the PGA of America.

== History ==
With the help of Burlington-area businessmen, the Vermont Open was inaugurated in 1940. The "local merchants" were able to raise a purse of $3,000 and the event was sanctioned by the PGA of America. A number of prominent local players from the northeast like Mike Turnesa, Jim Turnesa, and Bob Toski decided to play. In addition, top golfers on the national scene like Horton Smith, Dutch Harrison, and Pete Cooper were lured by the extensive prize money. The tournament was 72 holes long. Mike Turnesa, shooting a 284 total, won the event. The following year, however, "the PGA was unable to work out a date that fit into [their] schedule" and the tournament was not held. In the ensuing years, due to World War II and general negligence, the event was discontinued. In the late 1940s, however, the event was revitalized and has been continuously held since then. During this era, the tournament was reduced to 36 holes.

In 1994, the tournament expanded from 36-holes to 54-holes for the first time.

== Winners ==
| Year | Champion | Score | To par | Margin of victory | Runner(s)-up | Venue | Ref. |
|---|---|---|---|---|---|---|---|
| 2025 | Nicholas Pandelena | 199 | −11 | Playoff | Bryson Richards | Lake Morey Resort | |
| 2024 | Bryson Richards (a) | | | | | Lake Morey Resort | |
| 2023 | Shawn Warren | | | | | Lake Morey Resort | |
| 2022 | Berk Harvey | | | | | Lake Morey Resort | |
| 2021 | Garth McGee | | | | | Lake Morey Resort | |
| 2020 | No tournament due to COVID-19 pandemic | | | | | | |
| 2019 | Chris Wiatr | | | | | Lake Morey Resort | |
| 2018 | Alex Rainville | | | | | Lake Morey Resort | |
| 2017 | Peter French | | | | | Lake Morey Resort | |
| 2016 | Spencer Mellon | | | | | Lake Morey Resort | |
| 2015 | Hunter Stone | | | | | Lake Morey Resort | |
| 2014 | Richy Werenski | | | | | Lake Morey Resort | |
| 2013 | Michael Welch | | | | | Lake Morey Resort | |
| 2012 | Rich Berberian, Jr. | | | | | Lake Morey Resort | |
| 2011 | Marc-Etienne Bussieres | | | | | Lake Morey Resort | |
| 2010 | Michael Welch | | | | | Lake Morey Resort | |
| 2009 | Brent Paladino (a) | | | | | St. Johnsbury Country Club | |
| 2008 | Jim Renner | | | | | Lake Morey Resort | |
| 2007 | Trevor Murphy (a) | | | | | Lake Morey Resort | |
| 2006 | Brent Wanner | | | | | Lake Morey Resort | |
| 2005 | Michael Harris | | | | | Lake Morey Resort | |
| 2004 | Sean O'Hair | 202 | −8 | 2 strokes | Paul Dickson | Lake Morey Resort | |
| 2003 | Rodney Butcher | | | | | Lake Morey Resort | |
| 2002 | Chris Congdon | | | | | Lake Morey Resort | |
| 2001 | Rodney Butcher | | | | | Lake Morey Resort | |
| 2000 | David Gunas, Jr. | | | | | Lake Morey Resort | |
| 1999 | Peter Morgan | | | | | Lake Morey Resort | |
| 1998 | Joe CioE | | | | | Lake Morey Resort | |
| 1997 | Sean Duffy | | | | | Lake Morey Resort | |
| 1996 | John Elliott | | | | | Lake Morey Resort | |
| 1995 | Rodney Butcher | | | | | Lake Morey Resort | |
| 1994 | Jeff Grygiel | | | | | Lake Morey Resort | |
| 1993 | Andrew Pitts | | | | | Lake Morey Resort | |
| 1992 | Kevin Giancola | | | | | Lake Morey Resort | |
| 1991 | Jeff Lewis | | | | | Lake Morey Resort | |
| 1990 | Rich Parker | | | | | Lake Morey Resort | |
| 1989 | Bill Ziobro | | | | | Lake Morey Resort | |
| 1988 | Wilhelm Winsnes | | | | | Lake Morey Resort | |
| 1987 | Dana Quigley | | | | | Lake Morey Resort | |
| 1986 | Dana Quigley | | | | | Lake Morey Resort | |
| 1985 | Jeff Lewis | | | | | Lake Morey Resort | |
| 1984 | Bob Beauchemin | | | | | Lake Morey Resort | |
| 1983 | | | | | | Lake Morey Resort | |
| 1982 | | | | | | Lake Morey Resort | |
| 1981 | Peter Teravainen | | | | | Lake Morey Resort | |
| 1980 | | | | | | Lake Morey Resort | |
| 1979 | | | | | | Lake Morey Resort | |
| 1978 | | | | | | Lake Morey Resort | |
| 1977 | | | | | | Lake Morey Resort | |
| 1976 | Austin Straub | | | | | Lake Morey Resort | |
| 1975 | | | | | | Lake Morey Resort | |
| 1974 | | | | | | Lake Morey Resort | |
| 1973 | | | | | | Lake Morey Resort | |
| 1972 | | | | | | Lake Morey Resort | |
| 1971 | | | | | | Lake Morey Resort | |
| 1970 | | | | | | Lake Morey Resort | |
| 1969 | | | | | | Lake Morey Resort | |
| 1968 | | | | | | Lake Morey Resort | |
| 1967 | | | | | | Lake Morey Resort | |
| 1966 | Jay Dolan | | | | | Lake Morey Resort | |
| 1965 | Stan Baluik | | | | | Lake Morey Resort | |
| 1964 | Jay Dolan | | | | | Lake Morey Resort | |
| 1963 | Les Kennedy | | | | | Lake Morey Resort | |
| 1962 | Bob Crowley | | | | | Lake Morey Resort | |
| 1961 | Bill Ezinicki | | | | | Lake Morey Resort | |
| 1960 | Jay Dolan (a) | | | | | Lake Morey Resort | |
| 1959 | Bill Flynn | | | | | Lake Morey Resort | |
| 1958 | George Kinsman | | | | | Lake Morey Resort | |
| 1957 | George Kinsman | | | | | Lake Morey Resort | |
| 1956 | George Kinsman | | | | | Lake Morey Resort | |
| 1955 | Charles Sheppard | | | | | Lake Morey Resort | |
| 1954 | | | | | | | |
| 1953 | | | | | | | |
| 1952 | | | | | | | |
| 1951 | | | | | | | |
| 1950 | Johnny Thoren | | | | Charlie Sheppard | Bennington CC | |
| 1949 | Johnny Thoren | 135 | | 2 strokes | Charlie Sheppard | Burlington CC | |
| 1948 | Les Kennedy | 139 | | Playoff | Charlie Sheppard | Rutland CC | |
| 1942–1947: No tournament due to World War II | | | | | | | |
| 1941 | No tournament due to scheduling conflicts | | | | | | |
| 1940 | Mike Turnesa | 284 | | | | Burlington CC | |
