= National Airlines Open Invitational =

Golf tournament formerly on the PGA Tour

Coordinates: 25.944°N 80.314°W

Tournament information
- Location: Hialeah, Florida
- Established: 1969
- Courses: Country Club of Miami (West Course)
- Par: 72
- Length: 6,970 yards (6,370 m)
- Tour: PGA Tour
- Format: Stroke play
- Prize fund: US$200,000
- Month played: March
- Final year: 1971

Tournament record score
- Aggregate: 274 Bob Menne (1970); 274 Lee Trevino (1970); 274 Gary Player (1971)
- To par: −14 as above

Final champion
- (South Africa) Gary Player
- Location in the United States Location in Florida

The National Airlines Open Invitational was a professional golf tournament in south Florida on the PGA Tour. It was held in late March in Hialeah at the West Course of the Country Club of Miami in 1969, 1970, and 1971 At the time, it was among the richest events on tour, with a $200,000 purse and a $40,000 winner's share.

Gary Player was the final champion in 1971, two strokes ahead of defending champion Lee Trevino, who won the previous year in a playoff over Bob Menne. Player's win was his 75th worldwide.

In 1972, it was replaced on the schedule by the Jackie Gleason Inverrary Classic in Lauderhill, initially a month earlier in late February. Miami-based National Airlines co-sponsored its second edition in 1973, also won by Trevino, but not after. That tournament ended its affiliation with Gleason after 1980 and continues today as The Honda Classic in Palm Beach Gardens.

The other PGA Tour event in the Miami area was the Doral Open, which began in 1962 and was usually played in early March. It was sponsored by competing carrier Eastern Air Lines, also Miami-based, from 1970 through 1986.

== Winners ==
Year	Winner	Score	To par	Margin of victory	Runner(s)-up	Winner's share ($)	Ref.
1971	(South Africa) Gary Player	274	−14	2 strokes	(United States) Lee Trevino	40,000	
1970	(United States) Lee Trevino	274	−14	Playoff	(United States) Bob Menne	40,000	
1969	(United States) Bunky Henry	278	−10	1 stroke	(Australia) Bruce Crampton (United States) Bob Murphy (United States) Dan Sikes (United States) Dave Stockton	40,000	
