= Greater Bangor Open =

Golf tournament

The Greater Bangor Open was an American golf tournament. It was played annually from 1967 to 2017 at Bangor Municipal Golf Course in Bangor, Maine.

== History ==
In 1971, future PGA Tour star Lanny Wadkins played the event. In the three-round tournament, he closed with rounds of 64 (−8) and 63 (−9) to win. Many years later, Wadkins reflected about his success at the tournament with the Bangor Daily News. "I got it going there," he told them. "When you're going good, you think more and more low numbers." It was his first professional victory.

A number of other PGA Tour golfers have had played the event. In 1975, Wayne Levi played the Greater Bangor Open. He finished runner-up. In the late 1970s, PGA Tour players Bob Eastwood and Dave Eichelberger played the event. In 1982 and 1984, future PGA Tour member Jeff Sluman played the event. In 1996, former tennis star Ivan Lendl played in the event as part of his transition to become a professional golfer. In 2003 and 2004, future PGA Tour winner Sean O'Hair played the event. According to Connecticut club pro, Jim Becker, "Outside of the PGA and Nationwide Tours, this is one of the best events in the country."

In 2019, after being held for 52 consecutive years, the tournament ceased operations. The event was no longer deemed "economically feasible." Bangor Municipal's club professional, Rob Jarvis, explained, "The days of $1 per gallon gas and a $50 a night hotel room are long gone... To have 70 guys show up and have a small purse isn't worth it for them or for the golf course."

== Tournament names ==
- 1967–1971: Jordan Open
- 1972–1980, 1992–2016: Greater Bangor Open
- 1981–1991: Miller High-Life Bangor Open

== Winners ==
| Year | Champion | Score | Ref. |
|---|---|---|---|
| 2017 | Jason Thresher | 192 | |
| 2016 | Jesse Larson | 192 | |
| 2015 | Jon McLean | 197 | |
| 2014 | David Chung | 191 | |
| 2013 | Eric Steger | 129 | |
| 2012 | Will Mitchell | 198 | |
| 2011 | Jesse Speirs | 200 | |
| 2010 | Scott Hawley | 194 | |
| 2009 | Marc Hurtubise | 131 | |
| 2008 | Shawn Warren | 130 | |
| 2007 | Rob Oppenheim | 200 | |
| 2006 | Marc Lawless | 200 | |
| 2005 | Matt Donovan | 199 | |
| 2004 | Matt Donovan | 198 | |
| 2003 | William Link IV | 202 | |
| 2002 | Paul Dickinson | 200 | |
| 2001 | Jim Slinetti | 200 | |
| 2000 | Bill Downes | 199 | |
| 1999 | John Connelly | 202 | |
| 1998 | Joe Cloe | 206 | |
| 1997 | John Hickson | 203 | |
| 1996 | Brian Lawton | 200 | |
| 1995 | Eric Egloff | 201 | |
| 1994 | Jason Widener | 202 | |
| 1993 | Gus Ulrich | 199 | |
| 1992 | Jeff Julian | 206 | |
| 1991 | Mike Colandro | 205 | |
| 1990 | Andy Brock | 202 | |
| 1989 | Gus Ulrich | 205 | |
| 1988 | Richard Parker | 203 | |
| 1987 | Bob Mattiace | 208 | |
| 1986 | Mike Baker | 136 | |
| 1985 | Jeff Lewis | 203 | |
| 1984 | Chip Hall | 206 | |
| 1983 | Jeff Grygiel | 207 | |
| 1982 | Jeff Lewis | 207 | |
| 1981 | Peter Teravainen | 208 | |
| 1980 | Jack Ferenz | 205 | |
| 1979 | Mark Plummer (a) | 207 | |
| 1978 | Rocky Thompson | 213 | |
| 1977 | Bruce Douglass | 207 | |
| 1976 | Mike Buja | 206 | |
| 1975 | Mike Shea | 207 | |
| 1974 | Bruce Ashworth | 205 | |
| 1973 | Marlon Heck | 207 | |
| 1972 | Paul Barkhouse | 209 | |
| 1971 | Lanny Wadkins | 201 | |
| 1970 | George Johnston | 207 | |
| 1969 | Jerry Abbott | 209 | |
| 1968 | Joel Goldstrand | 203 | |
| 1967 | Ed Wiatr | 207 | |
