= PGA Tour Qualifying Tournament =

Method for golfers to earn PGA Tour cards

The annual PGA Tour Qualifying Tournament, also known as Qualifying School or Q-School, was historically the main method by which golfers earned PGA Tour playing privileges, commonly known as a Tour card. From 2013 to 2022, Q-School granted privileges only for the Korn Ferry Tour, the PGA Tour's official developmental circuit, but in 2023 it began to again award a small number of PGA Tour cards.

== History ==
At the PGA of America's annual meeting in 1963 Earl Stewart, a club professional from Dallas, first brought up the idea of having a qualifying school. Two years later at the inaugural q-school he explained to the press the purpose of the event. "It is designed to take the burden of making a judgement on a proposed player's talent away from the local level," he said. "Formerly the various sections were responsible for screening and qualifying a man for the tour, but all they do now is screen and recommend for the new qualifying tournament."

In several early years (1968–69, 1975–81), two separate tournaments were played, one in the spring and one in the fall. The format of the tournament has changed several times, ranging from a 72-hole tournament to a 144-hole tournament. In June 1977, Commissioner Deane Beman announced some changes. Sectional and regional components were added to the tournament. Beman thought it would help weed out mediocre players from playing in finals. He also thought it would be "easier from the standpoint of travel and accommodations" and would be "less expensive" for the players. Many players, however, thought sectionals were unnecessary as they only eliminated a small minority of players.

The current format (in place since 1982) is 108 holes over six days in late November and early December. Before 2013, the top 25 players and ties earned their tour cards. The next set of fifty finishers earned full Korn Ferry Tour cards. The remaining participants received conditional Korn Ferry Tour status.

The 2012 Qualifying Tournament was the last to grant playing privileges for the PGA Tour. On March 20, 2012, the tour announced radical changes to its season structure and qualifying process, and announced further details on July 10 of that year.

The 2013 season ended with The Tour Championship in September, and the 2014 season began the following month. Since then, the Qualifying Tournament only grants playing privileges for the Korn Ferry Tour (known as the Nationwide Tour at the time of the March 2012 announcement). A new series of three tournaments known as the Korn Ferry Tour Finals, held in September, grants 50 PGA Tour cards to a field consisting of the top 75 on the Korn Ferry Tour money list and the golfers placed 126 to 200 on the PGA Tour's FedEx Cup points list. The top 25 on the Korn Ferry Tour money list before the Finals receive PGA Tour cards, with total money earned in the Finals determining the remaining 25 card earners.

For 2023, qualifying school again awarded PGA Tour cards, this time to top five plus ties in the final stage. The next 40 plus ties were guaranteed starts on the Korn Ferry Tour. The next twenty plus ties earned full status on the PGA Tour Americas, while all others who reached the final stage received conditional Korn Ferry Tour and PGA Tour Americas status. The 2023 edition of Q School also awarded privileges on the PGA Tour Americas to first stage medalists. Second stage medalists also earned eight Korn Ferry Tour starts. For 2025, the number of card was reduced to exactly five, with a tiebreaker for the final qualifying position.

== Medalists ==
Year	Winner(s)	Cards
2025	(Canada) A. J. Ewart	5
2024	(United States) Lanto Griffin	6
2023	(Australia) Harrison Endycott	5
2013–2022: No Qualifying School
2012	(South Korea) Lee Dong-hwan	26
2011	(United States) Brendon Todd	29
2010	(United States) Billy Mayfair	29
2009	(United States) Troy Merritt	25
2008	(United States) Harrison Frazar	28
2007	(United States) Frank Lickliter	26
2006	(United States) George McNeill	40
2005	(United States) J. B. Holmes	32
2004	(England) Brian Davis	35
2003	(Sweden) Mathias Grönberg	34
2002	(United States) Jeff Brehaut	38
2001	(United States) Pat Perez	36
2000	(Australia) Stephen Allan	36
1999	(United States) Blaine McCallister	40
1998	(Canada) Mike Weir	41
1997	(United States) Scott Verplank	38
1996	(United States) Allen Doyle (United States) Jimmy Johnston	49
1995	(United States) Carl Paulson	42
1994	(United States) Woody Austin	46
1993	(United States) Ty Armstrong (United States) Robin Freeman (2) (United States) Dave Stockton Jr.	46
1992	(United States) Skip Kendall (Japan) Masahiro Kuramoto (United States) Perry Moss (Australia) Brett Ogle (United States) Neale Smith	43
1991	(United States) Mike Standly	48
1990	(United States) Duffy Waldorf	49
1989	(United States) David Peoples	59
1988	(United States) Robin Freeman	52
1987	(United States) John Huston	54
1986	(United States) Steve Jones	53
1985	(United States) Tom Sieckmann	50
1984	(United States) Paul Azinger	50
1983	(United States) Willie Wood	57
1982	(United States) Donnie Hammond	50
1981 (Fall)	(United States) Tim Graham (United States) Robert Thompson	34
1981 (Spring)	(United States) Billy Glisson	25
1980 (Fall)	(United States) Bruce Douglass	27
1980 (Spring)	(United States) Jack Spradlin	27
1979 (Fall)	(United States) Tom Jones	27
1979 (Spring)	(United States) Terry Mauney	25
1978 (Fall)	(United States) John Fought (United States) Jim Thorpe	27
1978 (Spring)	(United States) Wren Lum	28
1977 (Fall)	(United States) Ed Fiori	34
1977 (Spring)	(United States) Phil Hancock	26
1976 (Fall)	(United States) Keith Fergus	29
1976 (Spring)	(United States) Woody Blackburn (Australia) Bob Shearer	15
1975 (Fall)	(United States) Jerry Pate	25
1975 (Spring)	(United States) Joey Dills	13
1974	(United States) Fuzzy Zoeller	19
1973	(United States) Ben Crenshaw	23
1972	(United States) John Adams (United States) Larry Stubblefield	25
1971	(United States) Bob Zender	23
1970	(Canada) Robert Barbarossa	18
1969 (Fall)	(United States) Doug Olson	12
1969 (Spring)	(United States) Bob Eastwood	12
1968 (Fall)	(United States) Grier Jones	30
1968 (Spring)	(United States) Bob Dickson	15
1967	(South Africa) Bobby Cole	30
1966	(United States) Harry Toscano	32
1965	(United States) John Schlee	17
