= Kirk Hanefeld =

American professional golfer (born 1956)

Personal information
- Nationality: United States
- Born: May 24, 1956 (age 70) Claremont, New Hampshire, U.S.
- Height: 6 ft 0 in (1.83 m)
- Weight: 190 lb (86 kg; 14 st)
- Spouse: Kathleen

Career
- Sport: Golf
- College: University of Houston
- Turned professional: 1978
- Former tour: Champions Tour
- Professional wins: 10

Best results in major championships
- Masters Tournament: DNP
- PGA Championship: CUT: 1990, 2013
- U.S. Open: CUT: 1990
- The Open Championship: DNP

Kirk Hanefeld (born May 24, 1956) is an American professional golfer.

== Early life and amateur career ==
In 1956, Hanefeld was born in Claremont, New Hampshire. He attended the University of Houston for college. He played on the University of Houston Cougars golf team. During this timespan, during his summers off of school, he also won the New Hampshire Amateur twice and the New England Amateur once.

== Professional career ==
In 1978, Hanefeld turned professional. He was a member of the New England section of the PGA. He won a number of state opens around New England during his professional career.

As a senior, Hanefeld was a member of the Champions Tour.

== Amateur wins ==
- 1974 New Hampshire Amateur
- 1976 New Hampshire Amateur
- 1977 New England Amateur

== Professional wins ==
this list may be incomplete

- 1982 New Hampshire Open
- 1998 Rhode Island Open
- 2000 New England PGA Championship
- 2001 New England PGA Championship
- 2003 New England PGA Championship, Maine Open
- 2005 Maine Open, Rhode Island Open
- 2008 Senior PGA Professional National Championship
- 2011 Senior PGA Professional National Championship
