= Rodney Butcher =

American professional golfer (born 1970)

Personal information
- Nationality: United States
- Born: February 4, 1970 (age 56) Weymouth, Massachusetts, U.S.

Career
- Sport: Golf
- College: Florida Southern College
- Turned professional: 1992
- Former tour: Nationwide Tour
- Professional wins: 9

Best results in major championships
- Masters Tournament: DNP
- PGA Championship: DNP
- U.S. Open: T60: 1997
- The Open Championship: DNP

Rodney Butcher (born February 4, 1970) is an American professional golfer.

== Early life and amateur career ==
Butcher was born in Weymouth, Massachusetts. He attended Florida Southern College where he was a three-time NCAA Division II All-American. In 1992, he graduated with a degree in finance.

== Professional career ==
In 1992, Butcher turned pro. In 1998, he qualified for and played on the Nike Tour, the PGA Tour's only developmental tour at the time. He does not currently play on a specific tour and over the years has not amassed much success on either the PGA Tour or its developmental tours. He has, however, won many state opens, primarily in New England, along with the 2003 Bay Mills Open Players Championship on the Canadian Tour.

In 2009, Butcher played in three Nationwide Tour events, and three PGA Tour events, after a 5-year absence from either Tour.

== Professional wins (9) ==
=== Canadian Tour wins (1) ===
No.	Date	Tournament	Winning score	Margin of victory	Runner-up
1	Aug 24, 2003	Bay Mills Open Players Championship	−10 (69-72-67-70=278)	5 strokes	(Canada) Jon Mills

=== Other wins (8) ===
- 1995 Florida Open, Vermont Open
- 1997 Maine Open
- 1998 Massachusetts Open
- 2000 Rhode Island Open
- 2001 Vermont Open
- 2003 Vermont Open
- 2009 MS Coast Open

== Results in major championships ==
Tournament	1997	1998	1999	2000
U.S. Open	T60			CUT

Note: The U.S. Open was the only major Butcher played.

Did not play

CUT = missed the half-way cut
"T" = tie
