= Jim Renner =

American professional golfer (born 1983)

Personal information
- Nationality: United States
- Born: October 31, 1983 (age 43) Boston, Massachusetts, U.S.
- Height: 6 ft 1 in (1.85 m)
- Weight: 210 lb (95 kg; 15 st)

Career
- Sport: Golf
- College: University of Oklahoma; Johnson & Wales University
- Turned professional: 2007
- Former tours: PGA Tour; Web.com Tour
- Professional wins: 6

Best results in major championships
- Masters Tournament: DNP
- PGA Championship: DNP
- U.S. Open: CUT: 2014
- The Open Championship: DNP

Jim Renner (born October 31, 1983) is an American professional golfer.

== Early life and amateur career ==
Renner was born in Boston. He attended Bishop Feehan High School in Attleboro, Massachusetts for high school. He went to the University of Oklahoma in Norman, and Johnson & Wales University in Miami, where he won the 2005 NAIA Championship.

== Professional career ==
Renner earned his 2011 PGA Tour card by finishing T-22 at 2010 PGA Tour Qualifying School. He made the cut in 11 in 22 tournaments in 2011. He was demoted to the Web.com Tour. He finished 17th on the 2013 Web.com Tour regular season money list to earn his 2014 PGA Tour card. In 2016, he was a medalist at the Web.com Tour qualifying school to regain his Web.com Tour card for 2017.

== Amateur wins ==
- 2005 New England Amateur

== Professional wins ==
This list may be incomplete

=== Hooters Tour wins (2) ===
- 2009 Dothan Classic
- 2010 Sunset Hills NGA Classic

=== Other wins (4) ===
- 2008 Massachusetts Open, Vermont Open, Rhode Island Open
- 2009 Maine Open

== See also ==
- 2010 PGA Tour Qualifying School graduates
- 2013 Web.com Tour Finals graduates
