= New England PGA Championship =

The New England PGA Championship is a golf tournament that is the championship of the New England section of the PGA of America. The New England section encompasses the states of Maine, Massachusetts, New Hampshire, Rhode Island and Vermont (The other New England state (Connecticut) has its own PGA Section). It has been played annually since 1921 at a variety of courses in those states.

== Winners ==
- 2026 Dan Venezio
- 2025 Ed Kirby
- 2024 Ed Kirby
- 2023 Rich Berberian Jr.
- 2022 Liam Friedman
- 2021 Rich Berberian Jr.
- 2020 Shawn Warren
- 2019 Shawn Warren
- 2018 Rich Berberian Jr.
- 2017 Liam Friedman
- 2016 Matt Doyle
- 2015 Rich Berberian Jr.
- 2014 Rich Berberian Jr.
- 2013 Shawn Warren
- 2012 Ed Kirby
- 2011 John Hickson
- 2010 Scott Spence
- 2009 Paul Parajeckas
- 2008 Ron Philo
- 2007 Evan Belcher
- 2006 Frank Dully
- 2005 Troy Pare
- 2004 Ron Philo
- 2003 Kirk Hanefeld
- 2002 Chip Johnson
- 2001 Kirk Hanefeld
- 2000 Kirk Hanefeld
- 1999 Mike San Filippo
- 1998 Mike Baker
- 1997 Webb Heintzelman
- 1996 Dana Quigley
- 1995 John Hickson
- 1994 Heath Wessem
- 1993 Dana Quigley
- 1992 Joe Staffieri
- 1991 Dana Quigley
- 1990 Mike San Filippo
- 1989 Dana Quigley
- 1988 Bob Menne
- 1987 Keith Lyford
- 1986 Tony Kaloustian
- 1985 Dana Quigley
- 1984 R. Drue Johnson
- 1983 Bruce Dobie
- 1982 Joe Carr
- 1981 David Marad
- 1980 Paul Moran
- 1979 Larry Startze
- 1978 David Marad
- 1977 Tom McGuirk
- 1976 Tony Morosco
- 1975 Joe Carr
- 1974 Charles Volpone
- 1973 Ross Coon
- 1972 Ross Coon
- 1971 Charles Volpone
- 1970 Chick Evans
- 1969 Bob Menne
- 1968 Bill Flynn
- 1967 Bob Crowley
- 1966 Ross Coon
- 1965 Art Harris
- 1964 Paddy LeClair
- 1963 Bob Crowley
- 1962 Bob Crowley
- 1961 Bob Crowley
- 1960 Tex McReynolds
- 1959 Bob Crowley
- 1958 Bill Ezinicki
- 1957 Phil Friel
- 1956 Bill Ezinicki
- 1955 Jim Browning
- 1954 John Thoren
- 1953 George Morrison
- 1952 Les Kennedy
- 1951 Jerry Gianferante
- 1950 Tex McReynolds
- 1949 Francis Doyle
- 1948 Les Kennedy
- 1947 Jerry Gianferante
- 1946 Les Kennedy
- 1945 Les Kennedy
- 1944 Les Kennedy
- 1943 Dave Hackney
- 1942 Ben Loving
- 1941 Harold "Jug" McSpaden
- 1940 Harry Nettelbladt
- 1939 Harold "Jug" McSpaden
- 1938 Harold "Jug" McSpaden
- 1937 Bob Crowley
- 1936 Jim Fogertey
- 1935 Charles Grey
- 1934 Dave Hackney
- 1933 Henry Bontempo
- 1932 Ted Turner
- 1931 Charles MacAndrew
- 1930 Ted Turner
- 1929 Henry Cuici
- 1928 John Curley
- 1927 George Aulbach
- 1926 Dave Hackney
- 1925 Herb Lagerblade
- 1924 Willie Ogg
- 1923 John Cowan
- 1922 Gilbert Nicholls
- 1921 Gilbert Nicholls

Leo Diegel's 29th and final PGA Tour victory is listed as the 1934 New England PGA. However, the records of the New England PGA do not show him as the winner of that tourney in any year.
