= Maine Open =

The Maine Open is the Maine state open golf tournament, open to both amateur and professional golfers. It is organized by the Maine State Golf Association. It has been played annually since 1918 at a variety of courses around the state.

== History ==
The first tournament, in 1918, was won by Arthur H. Fenn, who is stated by some sources to be the first American-born golf professional.

== Winners ==
Year	Champion	Score	To par	Margin of victory	Runner(s)-up	Venue	Ref.
2026	Fletcher Babcock	197	−13	2 strokes	Caleb Manuel	Augusta CC	
2025	Jacob Sollon	196	−14	3 strokes	Kevin Johnson	Augusta CC	
2024	Sean Bosdosh	199	−11	2 strokes	Caleb Manuel	Augusta CC	
2022–23	No tournament						
2020–21	Not held due to COVID-19 pandemic						
2019	Jason Millard			Playoff	Matt Campbell; Jason Thresher; Shawn Warren	Augusta CC	
2018	Matt Campbell				Peter French	Augusta CC	
2017	James Dornes				Geoffrey Sisk	Augusta CC	
2016	Ted Brown				Jon McLean; Nicholas Pandelena	Augusta CC	
2015	Matt Campbell				David Hilgers	Augusta CC	
2014	Andrew Mason				Mark Purrington	Augusta CC	
2013	Evan Harmeling	133	−7	1 stroke	Geoffrey Sisk; Jesse Speirs	Augusta CC	
2012	Dustin Cone				Jimmy Lytle	Augusta CC	
2011	Michael Carbone				John Hickson; Shawn Warren	Falmouth CC	
2010	Dustin Cone				Robert Roylance; Mark Stevens	Fox Ridge GC	
2009	Jim Renner				John Elliott; Rob Oppenheim	Fox Ridge GC	
2008	John Hickson				Rich Parker	Fox Ridge GC	
2007	Todd Westfall				Mark Baldwin; Jerry Diphilippo; Rich Parker	Fox Ridge GC	
2006	Ricky Jones (a)				Mike Baker	Fox Ridge GC	
2005	Kirk Hanefeld				John Connelly; Rob Oppenheim	Riverside GC	
2004	Shawn Warren (a)				Todd Westfall	Riverside GC	
2003	Kirk Hanefeld				Mike Meehan	Riverside GC	
2002	Ryan Ouellette				Eric Egloff	Riverside GC	
2001	James Gilleon				Matthew Doyle	Portland CC; Purpoodock Club; Falmouth CC	
2000	Benjamin Nicolay				Rich Parker	Woodlands Club; Portland CC; Purpoodock Club	
1999	Kyle Gallo				John Connelly	Purpoodock Club; Falmouth CC; Woodlands Club	
1998	Joe Cioe				David Gunas Jr.	Falmouth CC; Woodlands Club; Portland CC	
1997	Rodney Butcher				Doug Johnson	Point Sebago Resort	
1996	Geoffrey Sisk	206	−10	5 strokes	Eric Egloff	Point Sebago Resort	
1995	Jerry Diphilippo				Doug Johnson	Riverside GC	
1994	David Cummings				Kevin Giancola	Riverside GC	
1993	Brian Quinn				Mark Fogg; Jeff Lewis	Riverside GC	
1992	Joe Clark Jr.				Jeff Julian	Riverside GC	
1991	Mike San Filippo	195	−21	6 strokes	Jeff Grygiel	Riverside GC	
1990	Pete Morgan				Jerry Diphillippo	Riverside GC	
1989	Andy Morse				Jim Becker	Riverside GC	
1988	Wilhelm Winsness				Jim Becker, Gus Ulrich	Riverside GC	
1987	Mike Colandro	202	−14	2 strokes	Jeff Lewis; Wilhelm Winsness	Riverside GC	
1986	Mike Colandro	209	−4	1 stroke	Charles Smith	Springbrook GC	
1985	Jeff Lewis				Joe Browning; Howie Johnson	Springbrook GC	
1984	Dana Quigley	204	−9	6 strokes	Jeff Lewis	Springbrook GC	
1983	David O'Kelly				Jeff Lewis	Gorham CC	
1982	Charles Smith				Tim Angis; Kirk Hanefeld	Riverside GC	
1981	Don Robertson				Don Kalode	Gorham CC; Riverside GC	
1980	Don Brigham				Paul Moran	Riverside GC	
1979	Jeff Lewis				Kirk Hanefeld; Ron Smith	Riverside GC	
1978	Charles Volpone				Jack Ferenz; Kirk Hanefeld	Riverside GC	
1977	Don Iverson				Rex Caldwell	Fairlawn G&CC; Riverside GC	
1976	Curt Madson	207		2 strokes	Bruce Dobie	Riverside GC	
1975	Bob Menne				Wayne Levi	Riverside GC	
1974	Paul Barkhouse				Joe Browning	Riverside GC	
1973	Ralph Johnston				Paul Barkhouse; Joe Browning	Fairlawn G&CC; Martindale CC	
1972	Paul Barkhouse				Rick Ambrose	Bangor Municipal GC	
1971	Steve Robbins (a)				Jim Dent; Paul Moran; Lanny Wadkins	Riverside GC	
1970	Ron Rief				Dave Eichelberger	Riverside GC; Portland CC	
1969	Jim Gillis				Barrie Bruce (a); Dick Stranahan; Jim Veno	Riverside GC	
1968	Bob Pacheco				John Mills (a)	Riverside GC	
1967	Rich Bassett				Dave Marad	Riverside GC	
1966	Ron Leclair				Charles Volpone	Riverside GC	
1965	Jim Veno				Tony Loch	Riverside GC	
1964	Ed Whalley				Bill Ezinicki; Ed Rubis	Riverside GC	
1963	Dan Keefe				Jay Dolan	Riverside GC	
1962	Jim Veno (a)				Jim Browning	Riverside GC	
1961	Charlie Shepard				Bob Crowley; Don Hoenig	Riverside GC	
1960	Bill Ezinicki				Bob Crowley	Penobscot Valley CC	
1959	Bob Toski				Bobby Locke	Penobscot Valley CC	
1958	Bob Crowley				Willie Goggin	Riverside GC	
1957	Jim Browning				Dick Diversi (a); Bill Ezinicki	Riverside GC	
1956	Art Butler (a)				Ed Oliver	Riverside GC	
1955	Jim Browning				Andy Manero; John Thoren	Riverside GC	
1954	Phil Friel				Ray Lebel (a)	Portland CC	
1953	Art Butler (a)				George Kinsman	Augusta CC	
1952	Jerry Gianferante				Leo Hansberry; John Thoren; Joe Wells	Augusta CC	
1951	Jim Browning				Jerry Gianferante	Riverside GC	
1950	Charlie Shepard				Leo Hansberry	Riverside GC	
1949	Charlie Shepard				Les Kennedy	Augusta CC	
1948	Les Kennedy				Leo Hansberry	Augusta CC	
1947	Ed Abbott (a)				Harold Wiley	Penobscot Valley CC	
1946	Ed Abbott (a)				Jim Browning	Bath CC	
1945	Leo Hansberry				Pete Moran	Bath CC	
1944	Larry Leete (a)				Ernest Newnham	Riverside GC	
1943	Not held due to World War II						
1942	Jerry Gianferante				Roy Adams	Riverside GC	
1941	Willie Wansa				Roy Adams	Augusta CC	
1940	Eddie Bush				Joe Pino	Wawenock CC	
1939	Roy Adams				Leo Hansberry	Mingo Springs; Rangeley GC	
1938	Jim Browning				Vic Overhamer	Riverside GC	
1937	Larry Rowe				Andy Gray	Augusta CC	
1936	Ernest Newnham				Eddie Bush	Portland CC	
1935	Ernest Newnham				John Boyd (a)	Penobscot Valley C	
1934	Ernest Newnham				Charlie Webber (a)	Augusta CC	
1933	Ernest Newnham				Charlie Webber (a)	Summit Spring GC	
1932	Ernest Newnham				Jack Leddy (a); Ernie Ryal	Old Orchard Beach CC	
1931	Les Tate				Ernie Ryal	Wawenock CC	
1930	Les Tate				Ernie Ryal	Penobscot Valley CC	
1929	Alex Chisholm				George Dodge	Poland Spring GC	
1928	Alex Chisholm				Sam Tirabassi	Webhannet GC	
1927	Ernest Newnham				Sam Tirabassi	Penobscot Valley C	
1926	Herb Lagerblade				George Dodge; F. C. Tyson; G. Voight (a)	Poland Spring GC	
1925	J. M. Robbins (a)				Frank Gilman; Ray Ouimet	Poland Spring GC	
1924	Gilbert Nicholls				Alex Chisholm; George Dodge; F. A. Gilman	Poland Spring GC	
1923	Willie Ogg				Herb Lagerblade	Poland Spring GC	
1922	Ernest Ryall				George Dodge	Kebo Valley GC	
1921	Charles L. Mothersele				Arthur H. Fenn	Poland Spring GC	
1920	Charles L. Mothersele				Alex Chisholm; W. C. Skelly	Poland Spring GC	
1919	F. A. Gilman				Alex Chisholm	Kebo Valley GC	
1918	Arthur H. Fenn				Alex Chisholm	Waterville Country Club	
