= Fall 1979 PGA Tour Qualifying School graduates =

This is a list of the Fall 1979 PGA Tour Qualifying School graduates.

== Tournament summary ==
One of the regional qualifying events was at Boca Lago Golf Course in Boca Raton, Florida. The top 15 players moved on to the finals. Among the notable qualifiers at that event were Rick Vershure, Kenny Knox, Wally Kuchar, and Mike Donald.

== List of graduates ==
#	Player	Notes
1	(United States) Tom Jones	
2	(United States) Chip Beck	
3	(United States) Mike Peck	
T4	(United States) Bruce Douglass	
	(United States) Scott Hoch	Winner of 1977 Northeast Amateur
6	(United States) Harry Taylor	
7	(United States) Jon Chafee	
T8	(United States) John Cook	Winner of 1978 U.S. Amateur
	(United States) Mike Donald	
T10	(United States) John Adams	
	(United States) Skeeter Heath	
	(United States) Tony Hollifield	
	(United States) Mike White	
T14	(United States) Stan Algrlt	
	(United States) Alan Fadel	
	(United States) Ron Milanovich	
	(United States) Mike Zach	
T18	(United States) Robert Donald	
	(United States) Ted Goin	
	(United States) Lance Ten Broeck	
	(Brazil) Jaime Gonzalez	
T22	(United States) Doug Black	
	(United States) Bill Murchison	
	(United States) Peter Teravainen	Winner of 1977 and 1978 Ivy League Championship
T25	(United States) Jim Fellner	
	(United States) Mitch Mooney	
	(United States) Scott Wadkins	
