= John Elliott (golfer) =

American professional golfer (born 1963)

Personal information
- Nationality: United States
- Born: September 5, 1963 (age 63) Bristol, Connecticut, U.S.
- Height: 5 ft 11 in (1.80 m)
- Weight: 225 lb (102 kg; 16.1 st)

Career
- Sport: Golf
- College: Central Connecticut State University
- Turned professional: 1987
- Former tours: PGA Tour; Nationwide Tour
- Professional wins: 5

Number of wins by tour
- Korn Ferry Tour: 2
- Other: 3

Best results in major championships
- Masters Tournament: DNP
- PGA Championship: CUT: 1983, 1984
- U.S. Open: CUT: 2004
- The Open Championship: DNP

John Elliott (born September 5, 1963) is an American professional golfer who played on the PGA Tour and the Nationwide Tour.

== Career ==
Elliott was born in Bristol, Connecticut. He attended Central Connecticut State University.

In 1987, Elliott turned professional. He joined the Ben Hogan Tour in 1991 and didn't find much success but went through qualifying school and earned his PGA Tour card for 1992. He struggled during his rookie year and had to go through qualifying school again to retain his card. He returned to the PGA Tour's developmental tour, now called the Nike Tour, in 1994 where he won the Nike Mississippi Gulf Coast Classic.

Elliott returned to the PGA Tour in 1996, earning his Tour card through qualifying school for the third time. After another unsuccessful year on tour, he returned to the Nike Tour in 1997 where he won the Nike Alabama Classic. In 1998, he recorded two runner-up finishes on the Nationwide Tour and earned his PGA Tour card through qualifying school for the fourth time. In his return to the PGA Tour, he struggled and returned to the Nationwide Tour in 2000. Between 2000 and 2004 he recorded five runner-up finishes on tour. He returned to the PGA Tour in 2005, earning his card through qualifying school for the fifth time and it would be his last year on Tour.

As of 2016, Elliott caddies summers at Shelter Harbor in Charlestown, Rhode Island, and winters at Dye Preserve in Jupiter, Florida.

== Professional wins (5) ==
=== Nike Tour wins (2) ===
No.	Date	Tournament	Winning score	Margin of victory	Runner-up
1	Apr 10, 1994	Nike Mississippi Gulf Coast Classic	−12 (68-71-68-69=276)	Playoff	(United States) Chris Perry
2	Apr 27, 1997	Nike Alabama Classic	−12 (69-66-69=204) (Note: Shortened to 54 holes due to weather.)	2 strokes	(United States) Tom Shaw

Nike Tour playoff record (1–0)

No.	Year	Tournament	Opponent	Result
1	1994	Nike Mississippi Gulf Coast Classic	(United States) Chris Perry	Won with par on first extra hole

=== Other wins (3) ===
- 1992 Massachusetts Open
- 1996 Vermont Open
- 2010 Rhode Island Open

== Results in major championships ==
Tournament	1983	1984	1985	1986	1987	1988	1989
U.S. Open							
PGA Championship	CUT	CUT					

Tournament	1990	1991	1992	1993	1994	1995	1996	1997	1998	1999
U.S. Open										
PGA Championship										

Tournament	2000	2001	2002	2003	2004
U.S. Open					CUT
PGA Championship					

Did not play

CUT = missed the half-way cut
"T" = tied
Note: Elliott never played in the Masters Tournament or The Open Championship.

== See also ==
- 1991 PGA Tour Qualifying School graduates
- 1992 PGA Tour Qualifying School graduates
- 1995 PGA Tour Qualifying School graduates
- 1998 PGA Tour Qualifying School graduates
- 2004 PGA Tour Qualifying School graduates
