= Bob Menne =

American professional golfer (1942–2023)

Personal information
- Full name: Robert Menne
- Nationality: United States
- Born: February 19, 1942 Gardner, Massachusetts, U.S.
- Died: June 2, 2023 (aged 81)
- Height: 6 ft 0 in (1.83 m)
- Weight: 185 lb (84 kg; 13.2 st)

Career
- Sport: Golf
- College: University of Miami
- Turned professional: 1965
- Former tours: PGA Tour; Champions Tour; European Seniors Tour
- Professional wins: 7

Number of wins by tour
- PGA Tour: 1
- Other: 6

Best results in major championships
- Masters Tournament: CUT: 1975
- PGA Championship: T30: 1970
- U.S. Open: CUT: 1977
- The Open Championship: DNP

Robert Menne (February 19, 1942 – June 2, 2023) was an American professional golfer. He played on the PGA Tour, the Champions Tour, and the European Seniors Tour.

== Early life and amateur career ==
Menne was born and raised in Gardner, Massachusetts. He graduated from Gardner High School in 1960. He attended college at the University of Miami in the early 1960s.

== Professional career ==
In 1965, Menne turned professional. He had at least seven top-10 finishes in PGA Tour events during his career including a win at the 1974 Kemper Open, which was held at the Quail Hollow Club in Charlotte, North Carolina. He won that tournament in a playoff with Jerry Heard. Menne also finished in a first-place tie with Lee Trevino at the end of regulation at the 1970 National Airlines Open Invitational but lost on the second extra hole of a playoff. His best finish in a major was a T-30 at the 1970 PGA Championship.

=== Senior career ===
After reaching the age of 50, Menne played some on the Champions Tour but with limited success. His best finish in a Champions Tour event was T11 at Raley's Senior Gold Rush in 1992. He had more success playing on the European Seniors Tour.

== Personal life ==
Menne lived in West Palm Beach, Florida. He had previously lived in Demarest, New Jersey.

Menne died on June 2, 2023, at the age of 81.

== Professional wins (7) ==
=== PGA Tour wins (1) ===
No.	Date	Tournament	Winning score	Margin of victory	Runner-up
1	Jun 2, 1974	Kemper Open	−18 (67-69-67-67=270)	Playoff	(United States) Jerry Heard

PGA Tour playoff record (1–1)

No.	Year	Tournament	Opponent	Result
1	1970	National Airlines Open Invitational	(United States) Lee Trevino	Lost to par on second extra hole
2	1974	Kemper Open	(United States) Jerry Heard	Won with birdie on first extra hole

=== Other wins (6) ===
- 1969 New England PGA Championship
- 1975 Maine Open
- 1981 Massachusetts Open
- 1985 New England Open
- 1988 New England PGA Championship
- 1991 Rhode Island Open

== U.S. national team appearances ==
- PGA Cup: 1988 (winners)
