= Rhode Island Open =

Golf tournament in Rhode Island, United States

The Rhode Island Open is the Rhode Island state open golf tournament, open to both amateur and professional golfers. It is organized by the Rhode Island Golf Association. It has been played annually since 1929 at a variety of courses around the state.

== Winners ==
- 2026 David Pastore
- 2025 Fletcher Babcock
- 2024 Tyler Gerbavsits
- 2023 David Pastore
- 2022 Ian Thimble
- 2021 Matt Shubley
- 2020 Canceled
- 2019 Rob Labritz
- 2018 John VanDerLaan
- 2017 Michael Carbone
- 2016 Jeffrey Evanier
- 2015 Patrick Pelletier
- 2014 Troy Pare
- 2013 Shawn Warren
- 2012 Jesse Larson
- 2011 Mark Stevens
- 2010 John Elliott
- 2009 Michael Carbone
- 2008 Jim Renner
- 2007 Brent Wanner
- 2006 Ron Philo
- 2005 Kirk Hanefeld
- 2004 Mike Capone
- 2003 Ron Philo
- 2002 Bryce Wallor
- 2001 Mike Baker
- 2000 Rodney Butcher
- 1999 John Hickson
- 1998 Kirk Hanefeld
- 1997 Scott Trethewey
- 1996 Dana Quigley
- 1995 Dana Quigley
- 1994 P. H. Horgan III
- 1993 Dana Quigley
- 1992 Dana Quigley
- 1991 Bob Menne
- 1990 Marc St. Martin
- 1989 Ed Kirby
- 1988 Wilhelm Winsnes
- 1987 Billy Andrade
- 1986 Gary Marlowe
- 1985 Brad Faxon
- 1984 Jim Hallet
- 1983 Brian Claar
- 1982 Jeff Bailey
- 1981 Dana Quigley
- 1980 Peter Teravainen
- 1979 Joseph F. Carr
- 1978 Bruce Ashworth
- 1977 Charles Volpone
- 1976 Cameron P. Quinn
- 1975 Norm Lutz
- 1974 Ross Coon
- 1973 Dana Quigley
- 1972 Jay Dolan
- 1971 Stan Baluik
- 1970 Bobby Greenwood
- 1969 John Levinson
- 1968 Ross Coon
- 1967 Jay Dolan
- 1966 Joel Goldstrand
- 1965 Paul Bondeson
- 1964 Jay Dolan
- 1963 Cameron P. Quinn
- 1962 Jimmy Grant
- 1961 Donald Hoenig
- 1960 Bill Ezinicki
- 1959 Bill Ezinicki
- 1958 Bill Ezinicki
- 1957 John Igoe
- 1956 Charlie Sifford
- 1955 Donald Hoenig
- 1954 Donald Hoenig
- 1953 William Newman
- 1952 John Thoren
- 1951 Donald Hoenig
- 1950 Robert Allen
- 1949 Charles Sheppard
- 1948 Charles Sheppard
- 1947 Felice Torza
- 1946 John Kent
- 1943–1945 No tournament
- 1942 Tom Mahan
- 1941 Johnny Farrell
- 1940 Johnny Farrell
- 1939 John Thoren
- 1938 John P. Burke
- 1937 Jim Turnesa
- 1936 John P. Burke
- 1935 T.S. Tailor, Jr.
- 1934 Michael J. Bobel
- 1933 Michael J. Bobel
- 1932 T.S. Tailor, Jr.
- 1931 Arthur Gusa
- 1930 Arthur Gusa
- 1929 Fred Bentley
