= John Morse (golfer) =

American professional golfer (born 1958)

Personal information
- Full name: John Paul Morse
- Nationality: United States
- Born: February 16, 1958 (age 68) Marshall, Michigan, U.S.
- Height: 5 ft 10 in (1.78 m)
- Weight: 180 lb (82 kg; 13 st)

Career
- Sport: Golf
- College: University of Michigan
- Turned professional: 1981
- Current tour: Champions Tour
- Former tours: PGA Tour of Australasia; European Tour; Nationwide Tour; PGA Tour
- Professional wins: 6
- Highest ranking: 67 (January 27, 1991)

Number of wins by tour
- PGA Tour: 1
- PGA Tour of Australasia: 2
- Korn Ferry Tour: 1
- Other: 2

Best results in major championships
- Masters Tournament: CUT: 1995, 1997
- PGA Championship: T41: 1996
- U.S. Open: 4th: 1996
- The Open Championship: T101: 1991

John Paul Morse (born February 16, 1958) is an American professional golfer who currently plays on the Champions Tour.

== Early life and amateur career ==
In 1958, Morse was born in Marshall, Michigan. He attended the University of Michigan and was an All-American member of the golf team and Big-10 Champion in 1980.

He won the 1978 Michigan Amateur and was the Big 10 Championship individual medalist in 1980.

== Professional career ==
In 1981, Morse turned professional. He began his career playing in tournaments in and around his home state of Michigan and eventually the Florida Tour.

Morse first made a name for himself on the Australasian Tour. One of Morse's finest performances on the Australasian Tour came in a runner-up performance in 1990. At that year's Australian Masters, Morse finished only two shots back from world number one Greg Norman while tying world number two Nick Faldo. Later in the year he would improve on that performance defeating Norman and Faldo, who remained #1 and #2 in the world, at the Australian Open. The win helped Morse move up to a world ranking high of #67 by the beginning of the next year.

In 1993, Morse returned to the United States in an attempt to earn his PGA Tour card. He played on the developmental Nike Tour and played very well, ultimately winning the 1993 Nike New England Classic. He earned his PGA Tour card by finishing fifth on the 1993 Nike Tour money list. He was 35 years old when he joined the tour.

Morse played full-time from 1994 to 1998. He was never a star on tour but did record a win the 1995 Hawaiian Open. He finished 42nd on the 1995 Money List. The following year he recorded his best finish at a major championship: solo 4th at the 1996 U.S. Open. In addition Morse picked up a runner-up finish at the 1995 Buick Challenge.

John Morse came to the 72nd Hole of the 1996 U.S. Open at one-under par only one stroke off the lead held by Steve Jones and Tom Lehman and tied with Davis Love III, who had just completed play at 279. Morse hit the fairway off the 18th tee then hit the green in regulation leaving himself a putt of just over 30 feet for birdie to tie the lead. His birdie attempt ran 4 feet past and the ball lipped out on his comeback putt for par. Morse finished the U.S. Open at EVEN for a total of 280 and 4th place alone.

Morse joined the Champions Tour in 2008. His best finish was T-3 at the 2008 AT&T Championship.

== Awards and honors ==
In 2006, Morse was inducted into the Michigan Golf Hall of Fame.

== Amateur wins ==
- 1978 Michigan Amateur
- 1980 Big 10 Championship (individual medalist)

== Professional wins (6) ==
=== PGA Tour wins (1) ===
No.	Date	Tournament	Winning score	Margin of victory	Runners-up
1	Jan 15, 1995	United Airlines Hawaiian Open	−19 (71-65-65-68=269)	3 strokes	(United States) Tom Lehman, (United States) Duffy Waldorf

=== PGA Tour of Australasia wins (3) ===
No.	Date	Tournament	Winning score	Margin of victory	Runner(s)-up
1	Mar 11, 1990	Monro Interiors Nedlands Masters	−13 (67-69-70-69=275)	2 strokes	(Australia) Ray Picker, (Australia) Terry Price
2	Dec 2, 1990	Australian Open	−5 (72-70-73-68=283)	Playoff	(Australia) Craig Parry
3	Nov 10, 1991	Air New Zealand Shell Open	−7 (67-67-66-73=273)	3 strokes	(Sri Lanka) Nandasena Perera

PGA Tour of Australasia playoff record (1–0)

No.	Year	Tournament	Opponent	Result
1	1990	Australian Open	(Australia) Craig Parry	Won with par on first extra hole

=== Nike Tour wins (1) ===
No.	Date	Tournament	Winning score	Margin of victory	Runners-up
1	Jun 27, 1993	Nike New England Classic	−10 (72-70-68-68=278)	4 strokes	(United States) Emlyn Aubrey, (United States) Pete Jordan, (United States) Sam Randolph, (United States) Larry Silveira

=== Canadian Tour wins (1) ===
No.	Date	Tournament	Winning score	Margin of victory	Runner-up
1	Aug 27, 1989	Lactantia Quebec Open	−7 (68-71-70-68=277)	Playoff	(United States) Kirk Triplett

== Playoff record ==
Asia Golf Circuit playoff record (0–1)

No.	Year	Tournament	Opponent	Result
1	1990	Sanyang Republic of China Open	(Philippines) Frankie Miñoza	Lost to birdie on first extra hole

== Results in major championships ==
Tournament	1984	1985	1986	1987	1988	1989	1990	1991	1992	1993	1994	1995	1996	1997
Masters Tournament												CUT		CUT
U.S. Open	CUT		CUT								CUT		4	T68
The Open Championship								T101				CUT		
PGA Championship												CUT	T41	

Top 10
Did not play

CUT = missed the half-way cut
"T" = tied

== See also ==
- 1993 Nike Tour graduates
- 1997 PGA Tour Qualifying School graduates
