= Bill Ezinicki =

Canadian ice hockey player and golfer

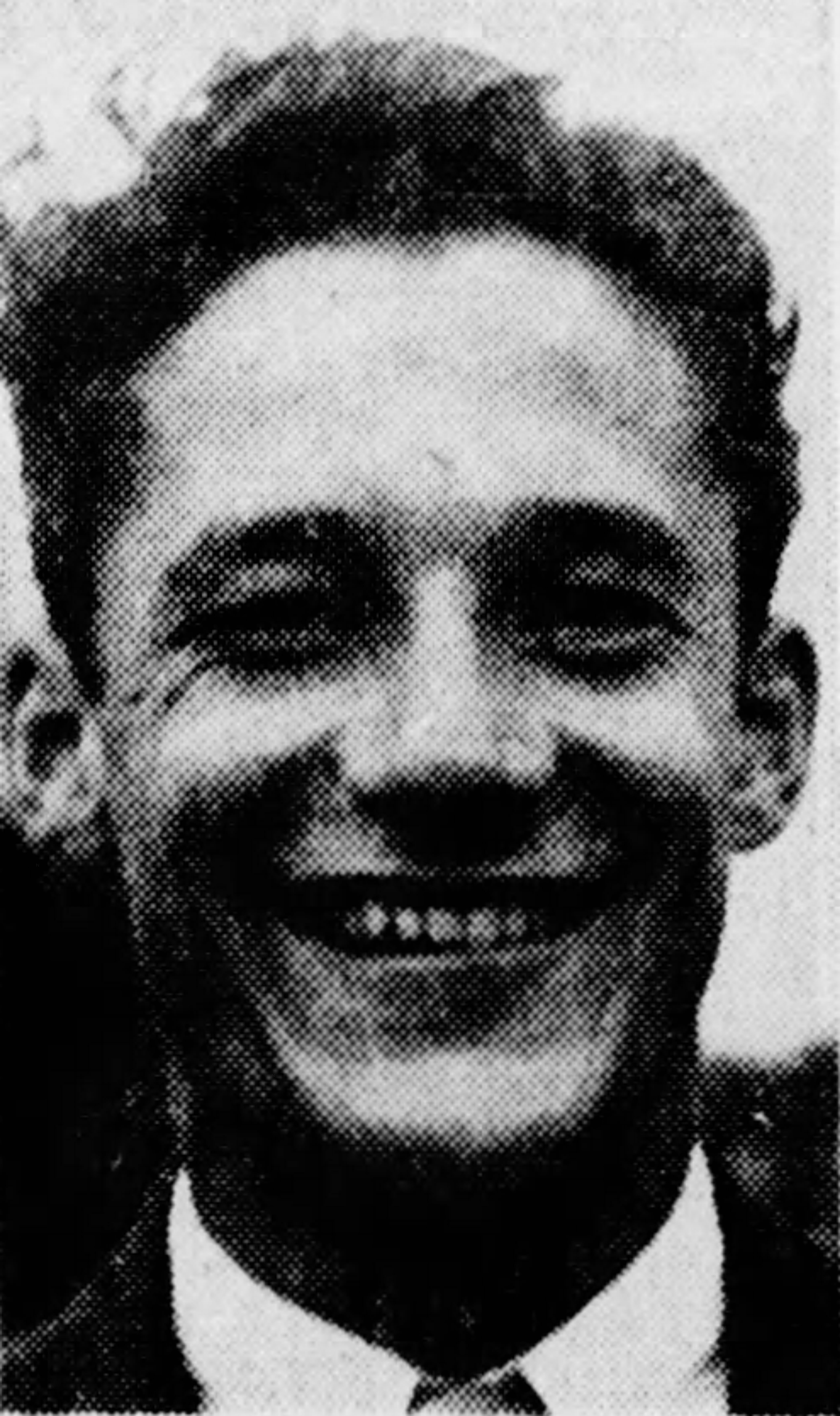
- Ezinicki pictured c. 1946
- Born: March 11, 1924 Winnipeg, Manitoba, Canada
- Died: October 11, 2012 (aged 88) Gloucester, Massachusetts, U.S.
- Height: 5 ft 10 in (178 cm)
- Weight: 170 lb (77 kg; 12 st 2 lb)
- Position: Right wing
- Shot: Right
- Played for: Toronto Maple Leafs; Boston Bruins; New York Rangers
- Playing career: 1944–1956

William "Wild Bill" Ezinicki (March 11, 1924 – October 11, 2012) was a Canadian professional ice hockey forward for the Toronto Maple Leafs (1944–1950), the Boston Bruins (1950–1952), and the New York Rangers (1954–1955) of the NHL. After his hockey career ended he became one of the leading tournament golf professionals in New England.

== Playing career ==
Ezinicki was born in Winnipeg, Manitoba. He was best known as a gritty hard-hitting player. He won the Stanley Cup three times with the Toronto Maple Leafs, in 1947, 1948 and 1949.

== Later life ==
Ezinicki became a professional golfer after retiring from hockey. He was head professional at The International in Bolton, Massachusetts. He won several tournaments in the New England region including four state opens in 1960. He was elected to the New England section of the PGA Hall of Fame in 1997.

Ezinicki, a long-time resident of Bolton, Massachusetts, died at the age of 88 on October 11, 2012.

== Career statistics ==
=== Regular season and playoffs ===
			Regular season					Playoffs
Season	Team	League	GP	G	A	Pts	PIM	GP	G	A	Pts	PIM
1941–42	Winnipeg Rangers	MJHL	2	3	0	3	0	—	—	—	—	—
1942–43	Oshawa Generals	OHA	16	21	10	31	21	10	13	10	23	26
1942–43	Oshawa Generals	M-Cup	—	—	—	—	—	11	17	6	23	33
1943–44	Oshawa Generals	OHA	25	38	25	63	33	11	13	3	16	49
1943–44	Oshawa Generals	M-Cup	—	—	—	—	—	10	12	11	23	34
1944–45	Toronto Maple Leafs	NHL	8	1	4	5	17	—	—	—	—	—
1944–45	Toronto Army Shamrocks	TIHL	1	1	2	3	10	—	—	—	—	—
1945–46	Toronto Maple Leafs	NHL	24	4	8	12	29	—	—	—	—	—
1945–46	Pittsburgh Hornets	AHL	27	9	12	21	23	—	—	—	—	—
1946–47	Toronto Maple Leafs	NHL	60	17	20	37	93	11	0	2	2	30
1947–48	Toronto Maple Leafs	NHL	60	11	20	31	97	9	3	1	4	6
1948–49	Toronto Maple Leafs	NHL	52	13	15	28	145	9	1	4	5	20
1949–50	Toronto Maple Leafs	NHL	67	10	12	22	144	5	0	0	0	13
1950–51	Boston Bruins	NHL	53	16	19	35	119	6	1	1	2	18
1950–51	Pittsburgh Hornets	AHL	13	6	3	9	24	—	—	—	—	—
1951–52	Boston Bruins	NHL	28	5	5	10	47	—	—	—	—	—
1951–52	Pittsburgh Hornets	AHL	16	4	9	13	53	11	3	1	4	67
1952–53	Pittsburgh Hornets	AHL	41	15	13	28	115	7	0	3	3	8
1954–55	Ottawa Senators	QHL	18	5	6	11	39	—	—	—	—	—
1954–55	Vancouver Canucks	WHL	15	5	2	7	50	—	—	—	—	—
1954–55	New York Rangers	NHL	16	2	2	4	22	—	—	—	—	—
1956–57	Sudbury Wolves	NOHA	19	5	4	9	32	12	1	9	10	29
NHL totals			368	79	105	184	713	40	5	8	13	87

== Achievements and awards ==
- Memorial Cup Championship (1944)
- Stanley Cup Championships (1947, 1948, & 1949)
- Honoured Member of the Manitoba Hockey Hall of Fame

== Golf tournament wins ==
this list may be incomplete

- 1956 New England PGA Championship
- 1958 New England PGA Championship, Rhode Island Open, New Hampshire Open
- 1959 Rhode Island Open
- 1960 Massachusetts Open, Rhode Island Open, New Hampshire Open, Maine Open
- 1964 Massachusetts Open
- 1965 Maritime Open
- 1969 Newfoundland Open
