= Sam Randolph =

American professional golfer (born 1964)

Personal information
- Full name: Samuel William Randolph
- Nationality: United States
- Born: May 13, 1964 (age 62) Santa Barbara, California, U.S.
- Height: 6 ft 0 in (1.83 m)
- Weight: 175 lb (79 kg; 12.5 st)

Career
- Sport: Golf
- College: University of Southern California
- Turned professional: 1986
- Former tours: PGA Tour; Champions Tour
- Professional wins: 1

Number of wins by tour
- PGA Tour: 1

Best results in major championships
- Masters Tournament: T18: 1985
- PGA Championship: CUT: 1988
- U.S. Open: T35: 1986
- The Open Championship: T56: 1986

Achievements and awards
- Haskins Award: 1985

Samuel William Randolph (born May 13, 1964) is an American professional golfer who has played on the PGA Tour and the Nationwide Tour.

== Early life ==
Born in Santa Barbara, California, Randolph learned the game of golf from his father, Sam Randolph Sr., who was the head professional at La Cumbre Country Club for 38 years. As a teen, Randolph and fellow future PGA Tour player, Billy Andrade, won the Junior World Cup in 1981.

== Amateur career ==
Randolph played college golf for the University of Southern California and was a three-time first-team All-American with 13 collegiate wins. After finishing as runner-up in 1984, he won the U.S. Amateur the following year. Randolph also won the California State Amateur, the Haskins Award, and was low amateur at The Masters in 1985. In 1986, Randolph was the low amateur at the Masters Tournament and the U.S. Open.

== Professional career ==
In late 1986, Randolph turned pro and joined the PGA Tour. He played on the PGA Tour from 1987 to 1992, and won one event, the 1987 Bank of Boston Classic. His best finish in a major championship occurred as an amateur; T-18 at The Masters in 1985.

From 1993 to 2002, Randolph split his playing time between the PGA Tour and the Nationwide Tour, mostly on the Nationwide Tour. He had three T-2 finishes in Nationwide Tour events in the 1990s, but no victories. After his playing career waned, Randolph moved into the teaching ranks.

== Awards and honors ==
Randolph was inducted into the USC Sports Hall of fame in 2005.

== Personal life ==
He lives in Fort Worth, Texas with his wife, Julie.

== Amateur wins (4) ==
- 1981 Junior World Cup (with Billy Andrade), Junior World Golf Championship (Boys 15-17)
- 1985 U.S. Amateur, California State Amateur

== Professional wins (1) ==
=== PGA Tour wins (1) ===
No.	Date	Tournament	Winning score	Margin of victory	Runners-up
1	Sep 13, 1987	Bank of Boston Classic	−14 (67-68-64=199) (Note: Shortened to 54 holes due to weather.)	4 strokes	(Australia) Wayne Grady, (United States) Gene Sauers, (Canada) Ray Stewart

== Results in major championships ==
Tournament	1985	1986	1987	1988	1989	1990	1991	1992	1993	1994	1995	1996	1997	1998
Masters Tournament	T18LA	T36LA		CUT										
U.S. Open	CUT	T35LA	T43				CUT			CUT				CUT
The Open Championship		T56												
PGA Championship				CUT										

LA = Low amateur

Did not play

CUT = missed the halfway cut
"T" indicates a tie for a place.

== U.S. national team appearances ==
Amateur

- Walker Cup: 1985 (winners)

== See also ==
- 1986 PGA Tour Qualifying School graduates
- 1990 PGA Tour Qualifying School graduates
