= Peter Teravainen =

American professional golfer (born 1956)

Personal information
- Nationality: United States
- Born: April 23, 1956 (age 70) Plymouth, Massachusetts, U.S.
- Height: 1.83 m (6 ft 0 in)
- Weight: 85 kg (187 lb; 13.4 st)

Career
- Sport: Golf
- College: Yale University
- Turned professional: 1979
- Former tours: PGA Tour; European Tour; Japan Golf Tour; Asian PGA Tour; PGA Tour of Australasia; European Seniors Tour
- Professional wins: 9
- Highest ranking: 93 (August 10, 1997)

Number of wins by tour
- European Tour: 1
- Japan Golf Tour: 2
- Asian Tour: 1
- PGA Tour of Australasia: 1
- Other: 4

Best results in major championships
- Masters Tournament: DNP
- PGA Championship: DNP
- U.S. Open: T52: 1997
- The Open Championship: T62: 1997

Peter Teravainen (born April 23, 1956) is an American professional golfer. He briefly played on the PGA Tour, in 1980, but did not have much success. For the remainder of his career he primarily played overseas, culminating with wins at the 1995 Chemapol Trophy Czech Open on the European Tour and the 1996 Japan Open Golf Championship on the Japan Golf Tour.

== Early life ==
Teravainen was born in Plymouth, Massachusetts and raised in Duxbury, Massachusetts. His father was a high school athletic director and basketball coach. His mother was a nurse. He is one of four children.

== Amateur career ==
Teravainen attended Tabor Academy and Yale University on scholarship. He played on the Yale Bulldogs golf team at college. Teravainen was regarded as the best player and was an All-American in 1976, 1977, and 1978. He was team captain his senior year. In 1976 he finished second place at the Massachusetts Amateur to Bruce Douglass. He won the individual Ivy League Championship in his junior and senior year. Teravainen graduated from Yale in 1978 with an economics degree.

== Professional career ==
Teravainen turned pro after spending one winter as a cocktail waiter at the Bellview Biltmore Hotel and taking lessons from Irv Schloss in Florida. Teravainen qualified for the PGA Tour at Fall 1979 PGA Tour Qualifying School. However, he did not find much success during his rookie 1980 season. He made the cut in only one event and was not close to keeping his card. Teravainen again tried to qualify for the PGA Tour at the Fall 1981 PGA Tour Qualifying School but failed by one shot. Back then the European Tour accepted the top 15 golfers who did not qualify for the PGA Tour at its Qualifying School. Teravainen accepted their invitation and began a long relationship with the European Tour.

Teravainen's first two seasons on the European Tour were only so-so but in his third season, 1984, he finished runner-up in two events and finished 15th on the Order of Merit. He would also qualify for his first major championship that year, the 1984 Open Championship held at St Andrews. He did not immediately progress on this success however. For the remainder of the 1980s he would keep his card but would rarely earn top-10 finishes and never come close to winning.

In the early 1990s his career almost ended. He had two knee operations in 1993 and could only play part-time. The following year he was plagued by tendinitis in the shoulder. By 1995, his career had hit rock bottom. This year shin problems contributed to poor play. He missed the cut or withdrew from 16 of his first 21 European Tour events; in the remaining five he usually finished near the bottom (a T34 was his only top 50). Teravainen spoke with Wally Uihlein, Titleist executive, that July about leaving life as a touring professional and working in the industry full-time. He did not receive a job offer, however, and continued to work as a touring professional. Late in the summer, he won his first professional event at the Chemapol Trophy Czech Open. Teravainen played three solid rounds in the 60s before shooting a final round 67 (−4) to overcome overnight leaders Howard Clark and Ronan Rafferty.

Despite finally winning after 14 seasons of struggle, Teravainen would soon quit the European Tour. He had married a woman in Singapore and the country had been his primary residence for years so he decided to focus on Asia. He had also had some success on the Asian circuit previously, winning the 1989 and 1991 Singapore PGA Championship.

In contrast to the United States or Europe, Teravainen would find immediate success in Asia. In 1996 he would finish runner-up at the Asian Tour's Rolex Singapore Masters and win the Merlion Masters. Both events were held in his hometown of Singapore. He would also win the Japan Open Golf Championship, the flagship event of the Japan Golf Tour. The victory would give him a 10-year exemption in Japan. Teravainen, who was already phasing out his European Tour schedule, would play in very limited schedule in Europe from then on and rarely in other parts of the world to focus on Japan. 1997 was another excellent season for Teravainen. He would win the Descente Classic Munsingwear Cup and finish second in the Japan Match Play, losing to Japanese star Shigeki Maruyama in the finals. These performances would help him break into the top 100 in the world for the first time in his career. He would also qualify for the Open Championship and, for only the second time, the U.S. Open that summer. He was suddenly something of a celebrity in Japan. He was recognized by many across the country and wrote about his life for Japanese golf magazines. Sports Illustrated eventually featured him in a full-length profile.

The remainder of Teravainen's career would not be as successful. He would play full-time in Japan from 1998 to 2004 but would not come close to winning again. He would miss the cut or withdraw from roughly 2/3 of the events he entered over these years because of a serious back injury. Eventually having a spinal fusion of the L5-S1 in 2008. After the 1999 season he would not record another top-10 finish.

His Japan Open exemption expired in 2006. This was somewhat serendipitous as it corresponded with his 50th birthday; Teravainen was now eligible for the senior tours and would not have to play regular tour events again. Teravainen attempted to qualify to the Senior PGA Tour but did not succeed. Like his regular career trajectory, he again turned to Europe. Due to his ranking on the regular tour's all-time money list, Teravainen automatically qualified for the European Seniors Tour. He played part-time from 2006 to 2010 but had limited success; in 37 total events he recorded only one top-10. He has not played on the European Seniors Tour since 2010. His hobby after retiring from professional golf in 2010 has been to help junior golfers find the right college in the US for their academics and for their golf game.

== Personal life ==
Teravainen is a Buddhist. He married Veronica, a Singaporean woman of Chinese descent, in 1988. She occasionally caddied for Teravainen shortly after they got married. Three years after their marriage they had a daughter named Taina. Teravainen is of Finnish descent.

== Amateur wins ==
- 1977 New England Intercollegiate Championship, Ivy League Championship, Southeastern Amateur
- 1978 New England Intercollegiate Championship, Ivy League Championship, Ouimet Memorial Tournament, Southeastern Amateur

== Professional wins (9) ==
=== European Tour wins (1) ===
No.	Date	Tournament	Winning score	Margin of victory	Runner-up
1	Aug 20, 1995	Chemapol Trophy Czech Open	−16 (67-66-68-67=268)	1 stroke	(England) Howard Clark

=== PGA of Japan Tour wins (2) ===
Legend
Flagship events (1)
Other PGA of Japan Tour (1)

No.	Date	Tournament	Winning score	Margin of victory	Runner-up
1	Sep 29, 1996	Japan Open Golf Championship	−2 (71-72-71-68=282)	2 strokes	(Philippines) Frankie Miñoza
2	Apr 6, 1997	Descente Classic Munsingwear Cup	−14 (67-67-67-69=270)	2 strokes	(United States) Todd Hamilton

=== Asian PGA Tour wins (1) ===
No.	Date	Tournament	Winning score	Margin of victory	Runner-up
1	Nov 10, 1996	Merlion Masters	−10 (70-70-70-68=278)	Playoff	(Myanmar) Zaw Moe

Asian PGA Tour playoff record (1–0)

No.	Year	Tournament	Opponent	Result
1	1996	Merlion Masters	(Myanmar) Zaw Moe	Won with birdie on first extra hole

=== PGA Tour of Australasia wins (1) ===
No.	Date	Tournament	Winning score	Margin of victory	Runner-up
1	Oct 20, 1991	Pioneer Singapore PGA Championship	−14 (67-69-67-71=274)	1 stroke	(Australia) Tony Maloney

=== Other wins (4) ===
this list may be incomplete

- 1980 Rhode Island Open
- 1981 Vermont Open, Greater Bangor Open
- 1989 Singapore PGA Championship

== See also ==
- Fall 1979 PGA Tour Qualifying School graduates
