= Andrew Yun =

American professional golfer

Personal information
- Full name: Andrew Yun
- Nickname: Iceman
- Nationality: United States
- Born: 17 May 1991 (age 35) Tacoma, Washington
- Height: 5 ft 8 in (1.73 m)
- Weight: 180 lb (82 kg; 13 st)
- Spouse: Luciane Yun
- Children: 3

Career
- Sport: Golf
- College: Stanford University
- Turned professional: 2013
- Current tour: PGA Tour Americas
- Former tours: Web.com Tour; PGA Tour; PGA Tour Canada; Forme Tour; Korn Ferry Tour
- Professional wins: 1

Andrew Yun (born May 17, 1991) is an American professional golfer. He has played on the PGA Tour, Web.com Tour, Korn Ferry Tour, PGA Tour Canada, Forme Tour, and PGA Tour Americas. He played collegiate golf for Stanford University where he won the 2012 Pac-12 individual championship. As an amateur, he won the Sahalee Players Championship and the Dogwood Invitational. He won the Rolling Green Golf Championship in 2021 on the Forme Tour.

== Early life and junior career ==
Yun is the son of Paul and Gloria Yun. He was raised in Tacoma, Washington. The family lived in Tacoma for 25 years where they owned several convenience stores and gas stations in Washington. Yun started playing golf at the age of 7 years old with his father. By age 11, he beat his father by one stroke, shooting a 76 at Oakbrook Country Club in Lakewood, Washington, which sparked his love for the game of golf. Yun's family lived near Chambers Bay in University Place, Washington and he was neighbors with future PGA Tour players Michael Putnam and Andrew Putnam. In 2005, Yun won the Pacific Northwest Junior Boys Championship.

The family moved to Arizona so that Yun could play golf year round. He played golf at Hamilton High School (Chandler, Arizona) where he was coached by Steve Kanner, and the high school team won state championships. He was inducted into the Chandler Sports Hall of Fame in 2024. As a junior, he earned Junior All-America Honors through American Junior Golf Association. He is tied with Justin Leonard and others for the most All-America Junior Honors (5, 2005-2009).

== College and amateur career ==
Yun attended Stanford University from 2009 to 2013. At the end of his freshman season, he received the Steele Award for the freshman with the lowest stroke average. In 2010, Yun won the Dogwood Invitational while at Stanford, and he shot a course record (tie) 62 at Druid Hills Golf Club in Atlanta. That same year, he won the individual title at the Prestige at PGA West in La Quinta, CA. In 2011, he competed in the U.S. Amateur, losing to Harris English in the first round at Erin Hills. He earned First Team, All-American Honors following the 2010-2011 season. He was the first alternate for the 2011 Walker Cup team and was invited to the practice session in 2012 for the 2013 Walker Cup. In 2012, Yun won the Pac-12 Individual Championship. After the 2011-2012 season, he was named to the Second Team, All-American.

In 2013, Yun was a finalist for the Byron Nelson Award. He was also named the Pac-12 Men’s Golf Scholar-Athlete of the Year. He finished with a career scoring average of 71.5, the third-lowest in Stanford men's golf history at the time behind only Tiger Woods and Patrick Rodgers. In 2013, he won the Sahalee Players Championship, beating SMU's Bryson DeChambeau.

== Professional career ==
Yun turned professional in 2013. He joined the EGolf Professional Tour, and won the Willow Creek Open in 2014. At the start of the 2017 Web.com Tour, Yun was runner-up in The Bahamas Great Exuma Classic. He was also runner-up at the BMW Charity Pro-Am. He shot a 62 at the Ellie Mae Classic at TPC Stonebrae. He earned a PGA Tour card for the 2017–18 PGA Tour season. Yun played in PGA Tour events in 2017–18 and made three cuts. He then played on the Mackenzie Tour (now PGA Tour Canada) from 2019, placing top-ten twice.

In 2021, Yun played the Forme Tour. He won the Rolling Green Championship at Rolling Green Golf Club in Pennsylvania. It was his first win on a PGA Tour-sanctioned tour. He earned conditional Korn Ferry Tour status for 2022. In 2021, he Monday-qualified for the Corales Puntacana Resort and Club Championship in the Dominican Republic on the PGA Tour and finished tied for 22nd. He attended the birth of his second child via FaceTime because of the tournament. In 2022, he was the runner up at the Rex Hospital Open on the KFT.

In 2026 Yun entered PGA Tour Americas events, including the Abierto del Centro in Argentina (T31). He has played in the Grass League for the San Diego Munis.

== Personal life ==
Yun is married, and his wife, Luciane, is a former Symetra Tour player. He has a child who is on the Autism spectrum, and he supports the Korean American Special Education Center, which helps support individuals with autism and their families.

== Amateur wins ==
- 2007 Arizona Amateur
- 2010 Dogwood Invitational
- 2010 the Prestige at PGA West
- 2013 Sahalee Players Championship

== Professional wins (1) ==
=== Forme Tour ===
No.	Date	Tournament	Winning score	Margin of victory	Runner-up
1	2021	Rolling Green Championship at Rolling Green Golf Club	(66-68-66-65=265)	2 strokes	(United States) Corey Shaun

== U.S. national team appearances ==
- Junior Ryder Cup: 2006, 2008 (United States won in 2008)
- Arnold Palmer Cup: 2011 Palmer Cup, 2012 Palmer Cup (United States won in 2011 and Yun won all four of his matches)
