= PGA Professional Championship =

Golf tournament for golf club professionals and teachers

The PGA Professional Championship is a golf tournament for golf club professionals and teachers who are members of the Professional Golfers' Association of America. It has been held by the PGA of America since 1968, when touring professionals split off to found the PGA Tour. It was known as the PGA Club Professional Championship until 2006 and as the PGA Professional National Championship from 2006 through 2015

Sam Snead and Bob Rosburg are the only players to win a major championship and the PGA Professional Championship. Bruce Fleisher and Larry Gilbert each would go on to win a senior major. Several other winners have had PGA Tour careers, either before or after winning the championship. The first edition in 1968 was held in early December in Scottsdale, Arizona.

The leading 20 players in the event receive an entry into that year's PGA Championship. The winner gets six exemptions into the PGA Tour for the next season, three of which must be opposite The Open Championship or World Golf Championship events. The top five finishers are also given entry into the second round of the PGA Tour Qualifying Tournament.

Although the event gives invitations to the men's PGA event, women are eligible to compete. Those who have made the 36-hole cut include Suzy Whaley (2005) and Karen Paolozzi (2016). Paolozzi placed inside the top 20 in 2016, but was not given entry due to the "Whaley Rule," where women must play from the same tees as the men during both the sectional and national tournaments.

== Eligibility ==
To earn entry into the PGA Professional Championship, players must have PGA membership, be certified as Class A PGA Professionals, and cannot have more than ten combined starts on professional tours (including various developmental tours, senior tours, and mini-tours) during a preceding twelve-month period, not counting majors. Players earn entry by allocations from championships of their respective PGA sections, as the defending champions of the Assistant PGA Professional Championship, or as former champions of the event.

== Format ==
The championship is a 72-hole stroke play tournament played over four days. Currently the field consists of 312 professionals representing the 41 sections of the PGA of America. At the end of two rounds, the top 90 and ties compete in round three. After round three, the field is reduced to the leading 70 and ties. Because of the large field, two courses are used for the first two rounds. The final two rounds are played on one of those courses.

The format has varied over years:

- 1968–1971: Two courses used for the first two rounds. A cut after two rounds with the leading 90 and ties playing in the last two rounds.
- 1972–1996: Three courses used for the first three rounds. A cut after three rounds with the leading 90 and ties playing in the last round.
- 1997–2005: One course used. A cut after two rounds with the leading 70 and ties playing in the last two rounds.
- 2006–2013: Two courses used for the first two rounds. A cut after two rounds with the leading 70 and ties playing in the last two rounds.
- 2014–present: Two courses used for the first two rounds. A cut after two rounds with the leading 90 and ties playing in the third round and then a second cut with the leading 70 and ties playing in the last round.

From 1968 to 1996 the tournament was played in the fall, anywhere from late September to early December. From 1997 to 2018, the tournament was played in the second half of June, six to seven weeks before the PGA Championship. which was held in mid-August. With the move of the PGA Championship to May in 2019, the PGA Professional Championship was moved to late April/early May.

== Qualification for the PGA Championship ==
The 20 leading players receive an entry into the following PGA Championship. The number of qualifiers was reduced from 40 to 25 in 1994 and then to 20 in 2006. If there is a tie for 20th place, a playoff occurs until exactly twenty advance to the PGA Championship.

With the change in dates from 1997, there were two club professional championships between the 1996 and 1997 PGA Championships. As a result only the winner of the 1996 event received an entry to the 1997 PGA Championship, 25 players qualifying through the 1997 event. The other players making the cut in the 1996 club professional championship were eligible to play in the 1997 event.

The 2020 edition of the PGA Professional Championship was cancelled due to the COVID-19 pandemic. For that year only, the 20 PGA Professionals given entry into the PGA Championship were based on a points system.

== Winners ==
Year	Winner	Score	To par	Margin of victory	Runner(s)-up	Winner's share ($)	Venue (Note: The venue used for the final round is given.)	Location
PGA Professional Championship
2026	Jesse Droemer	283	−1	1 stroke	Ben Kern		Bandon Dunes	Bandon, Oregon
2025	Tyler Collet	272	−15	10 strokes	Jesse Droemer	66,700	PGA Golf Club	Port St. Lucie, Florida
2024	Ben Polland	286	−2	3 strokes	Jared Jones; Andrew Svoboda	60,000	PGA Frisco	Frisco, Texas
2023	Braden Shattuck	279	−9	1 stroke	Michael Block; Matt Cahill	60,000	Twin Warriors	Santa Ana Pueblo, New Mexico
2022	Jesse Mueller	273	−10	5 strokes	Michael Block; Jared Jones	60,000	Barton Creek	Austin, Texas
2021	Omar Uresti (2)	276	−11	3 strokes	Frank Bensel Jr.	60,000	PGA Golf Club	Port St. Lucie, Florida
2020	Canceled (Note: Canceled due to the COVID-19 pandemic.)						Barton Creek	Austin, Texas
2019	Alex Beach	277	−10	2 strokes	Danny Balin	55,000	Belfair	Bluffton, South Carolina
2018	Ryan Vermeer	283	−5	2 strokes	Sean McCarty; Bob Sowards	55,000	Bayonet	Seaside, California
2017	Omar Uresti	283	−4	Playoff	Dave McNabb	50,000	Crosswater	Sunriver, Oregon
2016	Rich Berberian Jr.	277	−11	1 stroke	Mark Brown; Omar Uresti	75,000	Turning Stone	Verona, New York
PGA Professional National Championship
2015	Matt Dobyns (2)	279	−3	1 stroke	Ben Polland	75,000	Philadelphia Cricket	Flourtown, Pennsylvania
2014	Michael Block	286	−2	Playoff	Jamie Broce	75,000	The Dunes	Myrtle Beach, South Carolina
2013	Rod Perry	277	−10	3 strokes	Ryan Polzin	75,000	Crosswater	Sunriver, Oregon
2012	Matt Dobyns	275	−13	8 strokes	Kelly Mitchum; Rod Perry	75,000	Bayonet	Seaside, California
2011	David Hutsell	274	−11	Playoff	Scott Erdmann; Faber Jamerson	75,000	Hershey	Hershey, Pennsylvania
2010	Mike Small (3)	278	−8	3 strokes	Sonny Skinner	75,000	French Lick	French Lick, Indiana
2009	Mike Small (2)	277	−7	1 stroke	Steve Schneiter; Mark Sheftic	75,000	Twin Warriors	Santa Ana Pueblo, New Mexico
2008	Scott Hebert	276	−12	1 stroke	Sonny Skinner	75,000	Reynolds Plantation	Greensboro, Georgia
2007	Chip Sullivan	281	−7	4 strokes	Ryan Benzel; Mike Small	75,000	Crosswater	Sunriver, Oregon
2006	Ron Philo Jr.	278	−10	Playoff	Alan Schulte	75,000	Turning Stone	Verona, New York
PGA Club Professional Championship
2005	Mike Small (1)	289	+1	3 strokes	Travis Long	67,000	Kiawah Island	Kiawah Island, South Carolina
2004	Bob Sowards	276	−12	1 stroke	Mike Small	60,000	Longaberger	Licking County, Ohio
2003	Tim Thelen (2)	282	−6	1 stroke	Steve Schneiter	53,000	Twin Warriors	Santa Ana Pueblo, New Mexico
2002	Barry Evans	281	−7	2 strokes	Mike Gilmore	47,000	Valhalla	Louisville, Kentucky
2001	Wayne DeFrancesco	278	−10	3 strokes	John Aber; Don Berry; Mark Brown; Tim Thelen	40,000	Crosswater	Sunriver, Oregon
2000	Tim Thelen (1)	214 (Note: Only 54 holes, not 72, were played due to inclement weather.)	+1	Playoff	Mark Brown	40,000	Oak Tree	Edmond, Oklahoma
1999	Jeff Freeman	287	−1	2 strokes	Milan Swilor; Chris Toulson; Brett Upper	40,000	Whistling Straits	Kohler, Wisconsin
1998	Mike Burke Jr.	281	−7	3 strokes	Bob Gaus	40,000	Pinehurst Resort	Pinehurst, North Carolina
1997	Bruce Zabriski	281	−7	1 stroke	Mike Burke Jr. Jay Overton; Steve Schneiter	28,000	Pinehurst Resort	Pinehurst, North Carolina
1996	Darrell Kestner	271	−17	1 stroke	Dan Bateman	32,000	PGA West	La Quinta, California
1995	Steve Schneiter	278	−10	1 stroke	John DeForest; Bob Ford	32,000	PGA West	La Quinta, California
1994	Sammy Rachels	284	−1	Playoff	Darrell Kestner; Ron McDougal	32,000	The Oaks	Osage Beach
1993	Jeff Roth	275	−13	2 strokes	John Lee	32,000	PGA National	Palm Beach Gardens, Florida
1992	Ron McDougal	273	−15	3 strokes	Sammy Rachels	32,000	PGA West	La Quinta, California
1991	Larry Gilbert (3)	267	−14	1 stroke	Gene Fieger; Ron McDougal	32,000	Doral	Doral, Florida
1990	Brett Upper	275	−13	3 strokes	Gibby Gilbert; Larry Gilbert	32,000	PGA West	La Quinta, California
1989	Bruce Fleisher	277	−11	3 strokes	Jeff Thomsen	30,000	PGA West	La Quinta, California
1988	Bob Boyd	287	+1	Playoff	Rick Morton	30,000	Pinehurst Resort	Pinehurst, North Carolina
1987	Jay Lumpkin	279	−9	3 strokes	Gibby Gilbert; Bob Menne; Jeff Roth	30,000	PGA West	La Quinta, California
1986	Bob Lendzion	284	−4	1 stroke	Bob Betley	30,000	PGA West	La Quinta, California
1985	Ed Dougherty	277	−11	2 strokes	Jim White	27,500	La Quinta	La Quinta, California
1984	Bill Schumaker	284	−4	Playoff	Gary Ostrega	25,000	PGA National	Palm Beach Gardens, Florida
1983	Larry Webb	283	−5	4 strokes	Bob Ford	20,000	La Quinta	La Quinta, California
1982	Larry Gilbert (2)	284	−4	1 stroke	Steve Benson	20,000	PGA National	Palm Beach Gardens, Florida
1981	Larry Gilbert (1)	285	−3	Playoff	Don Padgett II	20,000	PGA National	Palm Beach Gardens, Florida
1980	John Traub	283	−5	2 strokes	Jim Albus	20,000	PGA National	Palm Beach Gardens, Florida
1979	Buddy Whitten	278	−8	Playoff	Jack Lewis Jr.	20,000	Callaway Gardens	Pine Mountain, Georgia
1978	John Gentile	276	−10	Playoff	Jim Ferree	17,000	Callaway Gardens	Pine Mountain, Georgia
1977	Laurie Hammer	282	−4	1 stroke	Steve Benson	16,500	Callaway Gardens	Pine Mountain, Georgia
1976	Bob Galloway	280	−6	1 stroke	Jim Ferriell; Larry Gilbert; George Lanning	16,500	Callaway Gardens	Pine Mountain, Georgia
1975	Roger Watson (2)	279	−7	Playoff	David Jimenez	16,500	Callaway Gardens	Pine Mountain, Georgia
1974	Roger Watson (1)	284	−3	Playoff	Sam Snead	16,500	Pinehurst Resort	Pinehurst, North Carolina
1973	Rives McBee	282	−5	3 strokes	Stan Brion	16,500	Pinehurst Resort	Pinehurst, North Carolina
1972	Don Massengale	280	−6	2 strokes	Bob Bruno	15,000	Pinehurst Resort	Pinehurst, North Carolina
1971	Sam Snead	275	−11	5 strokes	Ron Letellier; Jerry Steelsmith	15,000	Pinehurst Resort	Pinehurst, North Carolina
1970	Rex Baxter	285	−3	1 stroke	Bob Duden; Ernie George	8,000	Sunol Valley	Sunol, California
1969	Bob Rosburg	275	−13	1 stroke	Jimmy Wright	8,000	Roadrunner	Chandler, Arizona
1968	Howell Fraser	272	−15	4 strokes	Chuck Malchaski; Bob Rosburg	8,000	Century	Scottsdale, Arizona
