= AJGA =

AJGA may refer to:

- Alice Jamieson Girls' Academy, an all-female public school in Calgary, Alberta, Canada
- American Junior Golf Association
- Atlanta Junior Golf Association
