= Assistant PGA Professional Championship =

Golf tournament

The Assistant PGA Professional Championship is a golf tournament for golf club assistant professionals. It was called the PGA Assistant Championship until 2016 and has been held by the PGA of America since 1977. Rules for 2007 have the field made up of the assistant champions from each PGA section, section qualifiers, the defending champion and a representative from the PGA of Australia, The Professional Golfers' Association and the Canadian PGA. The 2015 Champion was Andy Mickelson. Notable players who won this event before competing on the PGA Tour include Loren Roberts (eight PGA Tour wins), Fred Funk (eight PGA Tour wins, most notably the 2005 Players Championship), and Wes Short Jr. (one PGA Tour win).

== Winners ==
| Year | Champion | Venue | Location | Score |
|---|---|---|---|---|
| 2025 | Sandra Changkija (first woman to win) | PGA Golf Club, Dye Course | Port St. Lucie, Florida | 280 |
| 2024 | Domenico Geminiani | PGA Golf Club, Wanamaker Course | Port St. Lucie, Florida | 276 |
| 2023 | Preston Cole | PGA Golf Club, Wanamaker Course | Port St. Lucie, Florida | 275 |
| 2022 | Domenico Geminiani | PGA Golf Club, Wanamaker Course | Port St. Lucie, Florida | 282 |
| 2021 | Jin Chung | PGA Golf Club, Wanamaker Course | Port St. Lucie, Florida | 274 |
| 2020 | Gunner Wiebe | PGA Golf Club, Wanamaker Course | Port St. Lucie, Florida | 278 |
| 2019 | Alex Beach | PGA Golf Club, Wanamaker Course | Port St. Lucie, Florida | 280 |
| 2018 | Kenny Pigman | PGA Golf Club, Wanamaker Course | Port St. Lucie, Florida | 273 |
| 2017 | Ryan Zylstra | PGA Golf Club, Wanamaker Course | Port St. Lucie, Florida | 277 |
| 2016 | Ben Polland | PGA Golf Club, Wanamaker Course | Port St. Lucie, Florida | 281 |
| 2015 | Andy Mickelson | PGA Golf Club, Wanamaker Course | Port St. Lucie, Florida | 272 |
| 2014 | Grant Sturgeon | PGA Golf Club, Wanamaker Course | Port St. Lucie, Florida | 275 |
| 2013 | Frank Bensel | PGA Golf Club, Wanamaker Course | Port St. Lucie, Florida | 278 |
| 2012 | Jake Scott | PGA Golf Club, Wanamaker Course | Port St. Lucie, Florida | 271 |
| 2011 | Frank Bensel | PGA Golf Club, Wanamaker Course | Port St. Lucie, Florida | 283 |
| 2010 | Frank Bensel | PGA Golf Club, Wanamaker Course | Port St. Lucie, Florida | 277 |
| 2009 | Tim Thelen | PGA Golf Club, Wanamaker Course | Port St. Lucie, Florida | 265 |
| 2008 | Kyle Voska | PGA Golf Club, Wanamaker Course | Port St. Lucie, Florida | 279 |
| 2007 | Chris Moody | PGA Golf Club, Wanamaker Course | Port St. Lucie, Florida | 277 |
| 2006 | Brad Lardon | PGA Golf Club, Ryder Course | Port St. Lucie, Florida | 274 |
| 2005 | Kyle Flinton | PGA Golf Club, Wanamaker Course | Port St. Lucie, Florida | 282 |
| 2004 | Kirk Satterfield | PGA Golf Club, Wanamaker Course | Port St. Lucie, Florida | 278 |
| 2003 | Kyle Flinton | PGA Golf Club, Dye Course | Port St. Lucie, Florida | 270 |
| 2002 | Kyle Flinton | PGA Golf Club, Wanamaker Course | Port St. Lucie, Florida | 271 |
| 2001 | Frank Dobbs | PGA Golf Club, Wanamaker Course | Port St. Lucie, Florida | 281 |
| 2000 | Alan Schulte | PGA Golf Club, South Course | Port St. Lucie, Florida | 282 |
| 1999 | Randall McCracken | PGA Golf Club, Wanamaker Course | Port St. Lucie, Florida | 211 |
| 1998 | Rick Gehr | PGA Golf Club, Ryder Course | Port St. Lucie, Florida | 280 |
| 1997 | Jim Schuman | PGA Golf Club, Ryder Course | Port St. Lucie, Florida | 280 ^{PO} |
| 1996 | Jim Schuman | PGA Golf Club, Wanamaker Course | Port St. Lucie, Florida | 276 |
| 1995 | Bruce Zabriski | PGA National Golf Club, Haig & Champion Courses | Palm Beach Gardens, Florida | 282 |
| 1994 | Wes Short Jr. | PGA West, Jack Nicklaus Private Course | La Quinta, California | 283 |
| 1993 | Steve Brady | PGA West, Jack Nicklaus Private Course | La Quinta, California | 284 |
| 1992 | Bill Loeffler | PGA West, Jack Nicklaus Private Course | La Quinta, California | 283 |
| 1991 | Kim Thompson | PGA West, Jack Nicklaus Private Course | La Quinta, California | 278 |
| 1990 | Steve Gotsche | Thorny Lea Golf Club | Brockton, Massachusetts | 205 |
| 1989 | Mike West | Thorny Lea Golf Club | Brockton, Massachusetts | 210 |
| 1988 | Webb Heintzelman | Thorny Lea Golf Club | Brockton, Massachusetts | 205 |
| 1987 | Darrell Kestner | Thorny Lea Golf Club | Brockton, Massachusetts | 210 ^{PO} |
| 1986 | Robert Thompson | Thorny Lea Golf Club | Brockton, Massachusetts | 209 |
| 1985 | John Fiedler | Thorny Lea Golf Club | Brockton, Massachusetts | 211 |
| 1984 | Fred Funk | Thorny Lea Golf Club | Brockton, Massachusetts | 206 |
| 1983 | Victor Tortorici | Thorny Lea Golf Club | Brockton, Massachusetts | 214 |
| 1982 | Darrell Kestner | Thorny Lea Golf Club | Brockton, Massachusetts | 213 ^{PO} |
| 1981 | Ted O'Rourke | Thorny Lea Golf Club | Brockton, Massachusetts | 210 |
| 1980 | John Jackson | Thorny Lea Golf Club | Brockton, Massachusetts | 205 |
| 1979 | Loren Roberts | Thorny Lea Golf Club | Brockton, Massachusetts | 212 |
| 1978 | Larry Griffin | Thorny Lea Golf Club | Brockton, Massachusetts | 209 |
| 1977 | Mike Zack | Thorny Lea Golf Club | Brockton, Massachusetts | 209 |

- ^{PO} - Won in playoff
