= Dogwood Invitational =

Golf tournament

The Dogwood Invitational is an amateur golf championship played annually at Druid Hills Golf Club in Atlanta, Georgia. Established in 1941, the goal of the Dogwood is to promote the game of amateur golf and support junior golf organizations. The tournament is run by The Dogwood Foundation, a 501(c)3 nonprofit. The invitational competition has consistently been a "Category B" tournament in the World Amateur Golf Ranking which means that it is one of the top 150 men's events world-wide based on strength-of-field.

The 18-hole, par-72 course at Druid Hills is 6,860 yards from the Dogwood Tees with a slope of 139 and 73.5 rating. The field is created via invitation only and is supplemented with an 18-hole open qualifier, during tournament week. Golfers are required to have a USGA handicap index of seven or lower in order to be considered for participation in the qualifier.

Beneficiaries of the monies raised during the Dogwood include the Atlanta Junior Golf Association, who holds more than 90 tournaments and golf training programs for children aged 7–16 in the metro-Atlanta area and The Wayne Reynolds Scholarship Foundation, which awards annual grants for four years to deserving junior golfers in the state of Georgia attending accredited colleges or universities.

The Dogwood Champion receives exemptions into the Canadian Amateur and Master of the Amateurs in Australia.

== Winners ==
- 2026 Carter Loflin
- 2025 Luke Coyle
- 2024 Garrett Engle
- 2023 Hunter Logan
- 2022 Carson Bacha
- 2021 Louis Dobbelaar
- 2020 No tournament
- 2019 Brandon Mancheno
- 2018 Ashton Poole
- 2017 Lloyd Jefferson Go
- 2016 Charles Huntzinger
- 2015 Dawson Armstrong
- 2014 Trey Rule
- 2013 Michael Johnson
- 2012 Ben Kohles
- 2011 Nate McCoy
- 2010 Andrew Yun
- 2009 Brian Harman
- 2008 Rory Hie
- 2007 Webb Simpson
- 2006 Hudson Swafford
- 2005 Stuart Moore
- 2004 Chris Nallen
- 2003 Lee Williams
- 2002 Andrew Buckle
- 2001 Kyle Thompson
- 2000 B. J. Staten
- 1999 Chris Morris
- 1998 Michael Kirk
- 1997 Steve Scott
- 1996 Robert Floyd
- 1995 Justin Roof
- 1994 Allen Doyle
- 1973–1993 No tournament
- 1972 Tom Evans
- 1971 Bill Harvey
- 1970 Allen Miller
- 1968–1969 No tournament
- 1967 Bill Harvey
- 1966 Charlie Harrison
- 1965 Vinny Giles
- 1964 Jack Penrose
- 1963 Vinny Giles
- 1962 Gene Dahlbender
- 1961 Gene Dahlbender
- 1960 Chuck Kocsis
- 1959 Jack Penrose
- 1958 Gene Dahlbender
- 1957 Gene Dahlbender
- 1956 Gene Dahlbender
- 1955 Tommy Barnes
- 1954 Frank Stevenson, Jr.
- 1953 Harvie Ward
- 1952 Harvie Ward
- 1951 Tommy Barnes
- 1950 Arnold Blum
- 1949 Tommy Barnes
- 1948 Tommy Barnes
- 1947 Gene Dahlbender
- 1946 Gene Dahlbender
- 1943–1945 No tournament
- 1942 Dan Yates, Sr.
- 1941 Tommy Barnes
