= Mac Meissner =

American professional golfer (born 1999)

Personal information
- Full name: McClure Meissner
- Nickname: Mac
- Nationality: United States
- Born: February 18, 1999 (age 27) Charleston, South Carolina, U.S.
- Height: 6 ft 3 in (1.91 m)
- Weight: 190 lb (86 kg; 14 st)
- Spouse: Kennedy (m. 2023)

Career
- Sport: Golf
- College: Southern Methodist University
- Turned professional: 2021
- Current tour: PGA Tour
- Former tours: Korn Ferry Tour; Forme Tour
- Highest ranking: 81 (May 31, 2026) (as of October 25, 2026)

Best results in major championships
- Masters Tournament: DNP
- PGA Championship: DNP
- U.S. Open: CUT: 2023, 2024
- The Open Championship: DNP

Achievements and awards
- AAC Golfer of the Year: 2019
- Byron Nelson Award: 2021

McClure Meissner (born February 18, 1999) is an American professional golfer who plays on the PGA Tour. He was runner-up at the 2025 Wyndham Championship.

== Amateur career ==
Meissner won the 114th Southern Amateur in 2020, and was part of the 2021 Walker Cup team.

He attended Southern Methodist University between 2017 and 2021. As a sophomore, he won the AAC Championship and was named AAC Golfer of the Year. As a junior, he broke Bryson DeChambeau's school record for single-season scoring average with a 70.44. A three-time All-American, he received the 2021 Byron Nelson Award for the senior with top collegiate golf career nationally.

Meissner finished 8th in the PGA Tour University rankings, to earn a place on the Forme Tour in 2021.

== Professional career ==
Meissner turned professional in 2021 and joined the Forme Tour, where he finished fifth in the season rankings to secure a Korn Ferry Tour card for 2022. In his rookie season on the Korn Ferry Tour, Meissner registered three top-10s and finished 46th in the season rankings.

In 2023, Meissner recorded a 59 at the LECOM Suncoast Classic, making 10 birdies and an eagle on the par-71 Lakewood National Golf Club in Florida. He lost a playoff at the Panama Championship and tied for third at the season-ending Korn Ferry Tour Championship to finish 20th in the season rankings, earning his PGA Tour card for 2024.

In 2025, Meissner rose into the top-100 on the Official World Golf Ranking for the first time after he was runner-up at the Wyndham Championship behind Cameron Young. In 2026, he tied for 3rd at the Charles Schwab Challenge, a stroke away from joining the playoff with Russell Henley and Eric Cole.

== Personal life ==
While at college, Meissner met his partner, Kennedy, who also played golf at SMU. They married in December 2023, and she works for the Payne Stewart Foundation.

His older brother, Mitchell, played college golf at Rice University and topped the 2022 PGA Tour Latinoamérica Order of Merit.

== Amateur wins ==
- 2019 The American Championship, Royal Oaks Intercollegiate
- 2020 Southern Amateur

== Professional wins (1) ==
=== Forme Tour wins (1) ===
No.	Date	Tournament	Winning score	Margin of victory	Runner-up
1	Jul 23, 2021	Bolingbrook Golf Club Invitational	−21 (68-65-63-71=267)	3 strokes	(Canada) Joey Savoie

== Playoff record ==
Korn Ferry Tour playoff record (0–1)

No.	Year	Tournament	Opponents	Result
1	2023	Panama Championship	(United States) Pierceson Coody, (United States) Sam Saunders	Coody won with birdie on first extra hole

== Results in major championships ==
Tournament	2023	2024
Masters Tournament		
PGA Championship		
U.S. Open	CUT	CUT
The Open Championship		

Did not play

CUT = missed the half-way cut

== U.S. national team appearances ==
Amateur

- Walker Cup: 2021 (winners)

== See also ==
- 2023 Korn Ferry Tour graduates
- Lowest rounds of golf
