= Turk Pettit =

American professional golfer (born 1998)

Personal information
- Nationality: United States
- Born: November 16, 1998 (age 27) Opelika, Alabama, U.S.
- Height: 6 ft 1 in (185 cm)
- Weight: 185 lb (84 kg)

Career
- Sport: Golf
- College: Clemson University
- Turned professional: 2021
- Current tour: Asian Tour
- Former tours: Korn Ferry Tour; Forme Tour; LIV Golf
- Professional wins: 2

Turk Pettit (born November 16, 1998) is an American professional golfer who plays on the Asian Tour. He won the 2021 NCAA Division I Men's Golf Championship. Pettit picked up his first professional win at the 2021 Birck Boilermaker Classic on the Forme Tour.

== Early life and amateur career ==
Pettit grew up in Auburn, Alabama and attended Lee-Scott Academy. He played collegiate golf at Clemson University. Pettit won the 2021 NCAA Division I Men's Golf Championship at the Grayhawk Golf Club in Scottsdale, Arizona. In 2021, Pettit was also named a first-team All-American by the Collegiate Golf Coaches Association.

== Professional career ==
On his third start on the Forme Tour, Pettit won the 2021 Birck Boilermaker Classic. In 2022, Petit joined LIV Golf, and later resigned his membership of the Korn Ferry Tour. Following the start of the first LIV Golf Invitational Series event, the PGA Tour announced that all current and former members who participated in LIV events would be indefinitely suspended from all tours operated by the tour. Pettit's suspension expired on October 17, 2023, and he entered the 2024 PGA Tour Qualifying Tournament. He advanced past the first round with a score of 9-under par. If he regains his PGA Tour card, he would be the first former LIV Golf player to regain playing privileges on the PGA Tour.

== Amateur wins ==
- 2018 Irish Creek Intercollegiate
- 2021 NCAA Division I Men's Golf Championship

== Professional wins (2) ==
=== Forme Tour wins (1) ===
No.	Date	Tournament	Winning score	Margin of victory	Runner-up
1	Jul 31, 2021	Birck Boilermaker Classic	−15 (66-71-69-67=273)	1 stroke	(United States) Joseph Harrison

=== Other wins (1) ===
- 2023 Colorado Open
