= Professional golfer =

Golfer with professional status; ordinarily cannot play in amateur tournaments

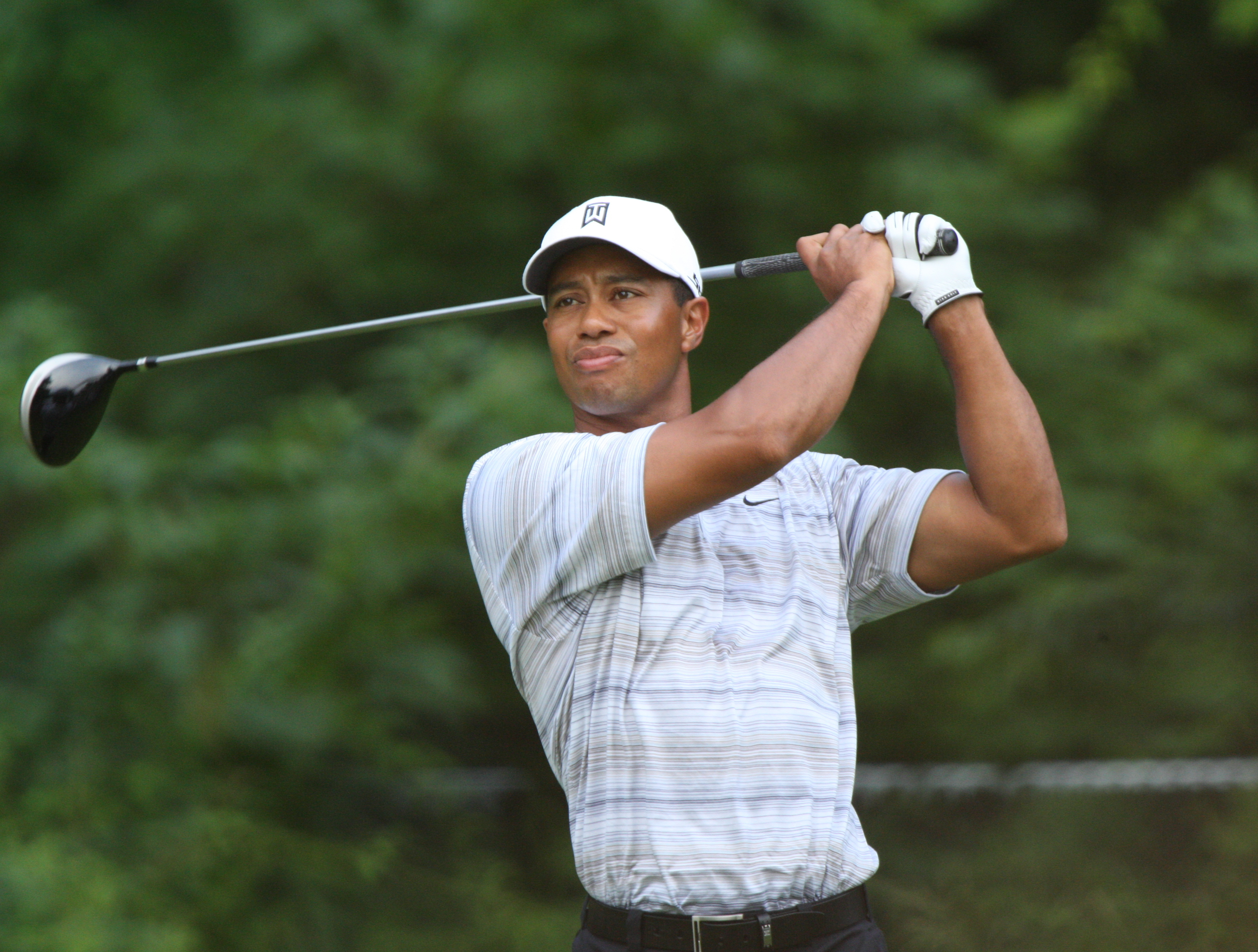
Tiger Woods hitting a drive in 2007

A professional golfer is someone who receives payments or financial rewards in the sport of golf that are directly related to their skill or reputation. A person who earns money by teaching or playing golf is traditionally considered a "golf pro", most of whom are teachers/coaches. The professional golfer status is reserved for people who play, rather than teach, golf for a career.

In golf, the distinction between amateurs and professionals is rigorously maintained. An amateur who breaches the rules of amateur status may lose said status. A golfer who has lost their amateur status may not play in amateur competitions until amateur status has been reinstated; a professional may not play in amateur tournaments unless the Committee is notified, acknowledges and confirms the participation. It is very difficult for a professional to regain their amateur status; simply agreeing not to take payment for a particular tournament is not enough. A player must apply to the governing body of the sport to have amateur status reinstated.

== History ==
Historically, the distinction between amateur and professional golfers had much to do with social class. In 18th and 19th century Britain, golf was played by the rich, for pleasure. The early professionals were working-class men who made a living from the game in a variety of ways: caddying, greenkeeping, clubmaking, and playing challenge matches. When golf arrived in America at the end of the 19th century, it was an elite sport there, too. Early American golf clubs imported their professionals from Britain. It was not possible to make a living solely from playing tournament golf until some way into the 20th century (Walter Hagen is sometimes considered to have been the first man to have done so).

In the developed world, the class distinction is now almost entirely irrelevant. Golf is affordable at public courses to a large portion of the population, and most golf professionals are from middle-class backgrounds, which are often the same sort of backgrounds as the members of the clubs where they work or the people they teach the game, and are educated to university level. Leading tournament golfers are very wealthy; upper class in the modern U.S. usage of the term. However, in some developing countries, there is still a class distinction. Typically, golf is restricted to a much smaller and more elite section of society than is the case in countries like the United States and the United Kingdom. Professional golfers from these countries are quite often from poor backgrounds and start their careers as caddies, for example, Ángel Cabrera of Argentina, and Zhang Lian-wei, who is the first significant tournament professional from the People's Republic of China. In various countries, Professional Golfers' Associations (PGAs) serve either or both of these categories of professionals. There are separate LPGAs (Ladies Professional Golf Associations) for women.

== Rules ==
Under the rules of golf and amateur status, the maximum value of a prize an amateur can accept is £700 or US$1000. Before the most recent increase in 2022, the maximum had been £500 or $750. The 2022 changes also significantly reduced the scope of competitions in which the prize limit applies. Before that time, the only competitions exempt from prize limits were hole in one contests. The 2022 changes took all competitions in which the player's score on a hole is not the primary goal, such as long drive and putting competitions, outside the amateurism rules. If an amateur accepts a prize of greater than this in a competition covered by the amateurism rules, they forfeit their amateur status, and are therefore by definition a professional golfer.

Professional golfers are divided into two main groups, with a limited amount of overlap between them:

- The great majority of professional golfers make their living from teaching the game, running golf clubs and courses, and dealing in golf equipment. In golf, pro refers to individuals involved in the service of other golfers. The senior professional golfer at a golf club is usually referred to as the club professional, but at a large golf club or resort with several courses their job title is likely to be director of golf. If they have assistants who are registered professional golfers, they are known as assistant professionals. A golfer who concentrates wholly or nearly so on giving golf lessons is a teaching professional, golf instructor or golf coach. Most of these people will enter a few tournaments against their peers each year, and occasionally they may qualify to play in important tournaments with the other group of professional golfers mentioned below. Many club and teaching professionals working in the golf industry start as caddies, or a general interest in the game, finding employment at golf courses and eventually moving on to certifications in their chosen profession. These programs include independent institutions and universities, and those that eventually lead to a Class A golf professional certification.
  - Note that the amateur rules of the R&A and United States Golf Association define "instruction" strictly as teaching the physical aspects of golf. Sports psychology and general fitness coaching are explicitly excluded from this definition.
  - The most recent 2022 changes to amateurism rules also explicitly state that amateurs may provide "one-way" instruction, either in writing or digitally, without losing amateur status. For this purpose, "one-way" is defined as instruction that is directed to a general audience without direct communication between the instructor and a specific individual or group. Before 2022, only written instruction was exempt from amateurism regulations.
- A much smaller but higher profile group of professional golfers earn a living from playing in golf tournaments, or seriously aspire to do so. Their income comes from some combination of prize money and endorsements, of which there is strong correlation between the two since the best performing golfers also have among the highest profiles, and are thus most desired by sponsors. Occasionally, the most elite players can also command appearance fees which are payable regardless of how well they perform. These individuals are referred to as tournament pros, tour professionals, or pro golfers.

== Professional Golfers' Associations ==
National and regional professional associations for golf professionals often have the name "Professional Golfers' Association" (PGA). They include the PGA of Great Britain and Ireland (founded in 1901), the PGA of America (founded in 1916), and the PGA of Australia (founded in 1911). PGAs sometimes organise or authorise golf tournaments or tours (circuits of tournaments).

=== PGA of America ===
The PGA of America has 24 distinct A classifications for active members, most of which have B equivalents for apprentices. (There are other classes for retired, life, or honorary members.) Class A-3 approximates to the "tour professionals" mentioned earlier; it originated as the PGA "Tournament Players Division" in 1968, which rebranded in 1975 as the PGA Tour, the same name as its top tournament circuit. The PGA of America organises tournaments with different eligibility:

- PGA Championship – a major championship contested by the top tour professionals
- PGA Professional Championship – for professionals with little or no tour experience
- Assistant PGA Professional Championship – for club assistant professionals

PGA of America classifications
Member Classification	Apprentice Classification	Description
A-1	B-1	Head professional at a PGA recognized golf course
A-2	B-2	Head professional at a PGA recognized golf range
A-3	N/A	Exempt PGA Tour, PGA Tour Champions, Korn Ferry Tour, LPGA Tour and Epson Tour players
A-4	B-4	Director of golf at PGA recognized golf facilities
A-5	N/A	Past presidents of the association
A-6	B-6	Golf instructor at a PGA recognized racility
A-7	B-7	Head professional at a PGA recognized facility under construction
A-8	B-8	Assistant golf professional at a PGA recognized facility
A-9	B-9	Employed in professional positions in management, development, ownership operation and/or financing of facilities
A-10	B-10	Golf clinician
A-11	B-11	Golf administrator
A-12	B-12	College or university golf coach
A-13	B-13	General manager
A-14	B-14	Director of instruction at a PGA recognized facility
A-15	B-15	Ownership or management of a retail golf facility
A-16	B-16	Golf course architect
A-17	B-17	Golf course superintendent
A-18	B-18	Golf media
A-19	B-19	Golf manufacturer management
A-20	B-20	Golf manufacturer sales representative
A-21	B-21	Tournament coordinator/director for organizations, businesses or associations
A-22	B-22	Rules official
A-23	B-23	Club fitting/club repair
A-24	N/A	Employed within the golf industry and not eligible for another active classification
HM	N/A	Honorary member
IN	N/A	Not eligible for classification as active, life member or retired member
LM/LMM	N/A	Not eligible for classification as active member and who have held a minimum of 20 years in an active classification (whether continuous or not)
LMA/LMMA	N/A	Not eligible for classification as active member and who have held a minimum of 20 years in an active classification (whether continuous or not)
MP	N/A	Master professional
RM	N/A	Members who are fully retired (cannot be working in either a golf or non-golf position) and who have achieved a combined 65 years of age and active membership and who are not eligible for life member
F	N/A	Failure to meet the requirements of the Professional Development Program

== See also ==
- Lists of golfers - lists of professional (and amateur) golfers
- PGA Tour
