= La Quinta Resort & Club =

Resort hotel opened in 1926 in La Quinta, California

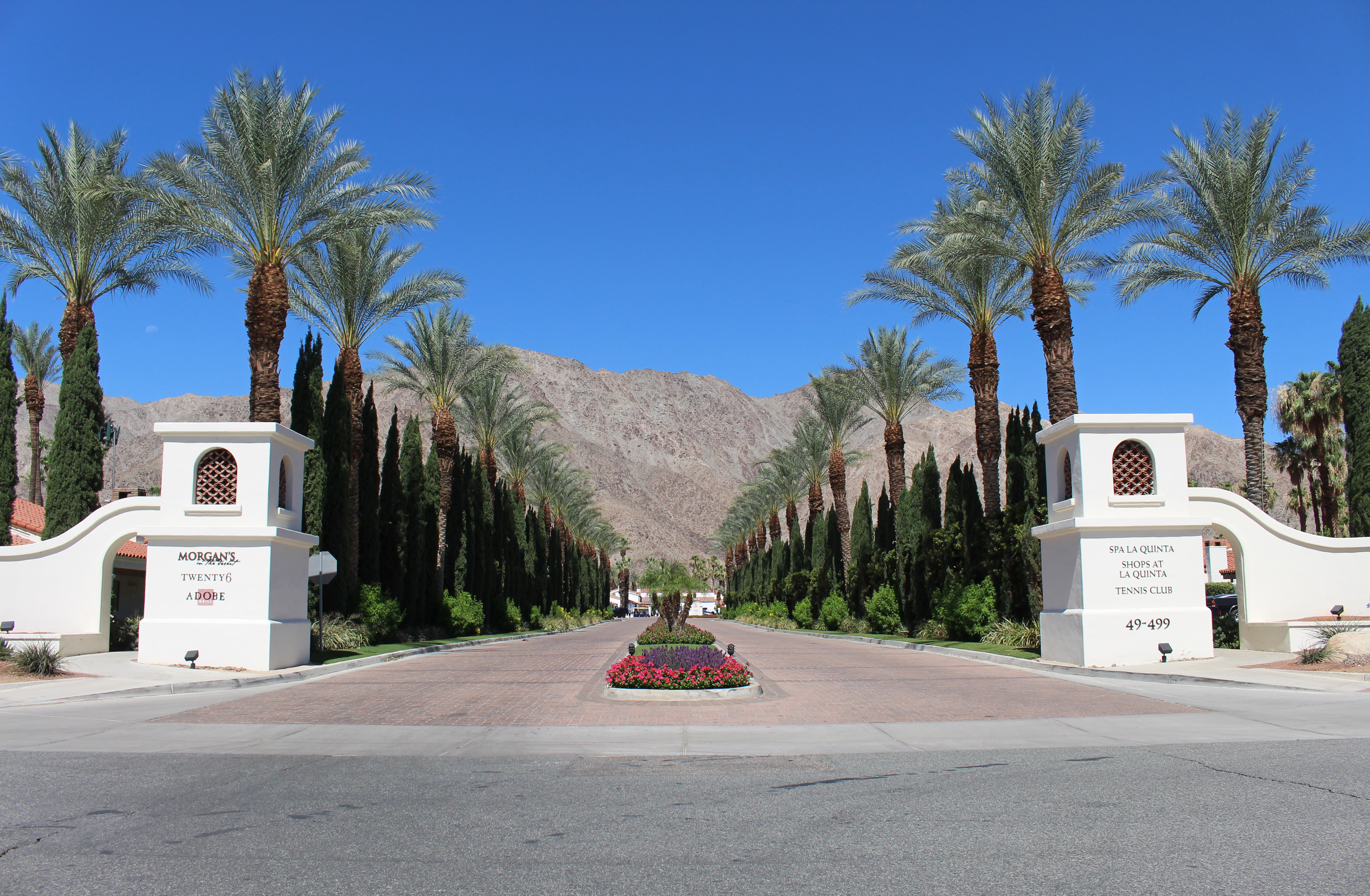
- Front entrance of the resort

- Location within California
- Interactive map of the La Quinta Resort & Club area
- Hotel chain: Curio Collection by Hilton

General information
- Location: La Quinta, California, U.S., 49499 Eisenhower Drive, La Quinta, CA 92253
- Coordinates: 33°41′18″N 116°18′39″W
- Opening: December 29, 1926 (soft); January 1927 (public)
- Owner: Henderson Park (acquired 2021/22)
- Operator: Pyramid Global Hospitality

Design and construction
- Architect: Gordon Kaufmann
- Developer: Walter H. Morgan

Other information
- Number of rooms: 787 (620 casitas; 98 one-, two- and three-bedroom villas)

Website
- www.laquintaresort.com

La Quinta Resort & Club is a historic resort located in the city of La Quinta, California, within the Coachella Valley. Opened in 1926 as one of the area's early destination resorts, the hotel held a soft opening on December 29, 1926, and opened to the public in January 1927.

The 45-acre resort sits at the base of the Santa Rosa Mountains in the city of La Quinta, California. It has 718 accommodations, including 620 casitas and 98 one-, two- and three-bedroom villas. According to the resort's specifications, the property has more than 190,000 square feet of indoor and outdoor meeting and event space, including the Fiesta Ballroom (16,940 sq ft) and the Frank Capra Ballroom (5,952 sq ft). Racquet facilities include 21 tennis courts and eight pickleball courts. Spa La Quinta is 34,000 square feet and has 38 treatment rooms and a salon. An early nine-hole dirt golf course was laid out on the grounds in 1926 by Norman Macbeth; later resort and PGA West courses followed.

== History ==
Walter H. Morgan commissioned Gordon Kaufmann to design the original La Quinta Hotel, which opened in late 1926.

Both La Quinta Resort & Club and PGA West were acquired by the Morgan Stanley Real Estate Fund in 2007. In 2011, lenders including Paulson & Co., Winthrop Realty Trust and Capital Trust foreclosed on part of the portfolio, and in 2013 the owners reached a deal to sell La Quinta and three other properties to the Government of Singapore Investment Corporation.

In December 2021, Blackstone sold La Quinta Resort & Club to Henderson Park, a London-based private equity firm, for US$255 million.

== Architecture ==
The resort's original adobe bungalows and public spaces were designed by Gordon Kaufmann in the Spanish Colonial Revival style, with white stucco walls, red-tile roofs, and landscaped courtyards.

== Renovation (2024) ==
The resort completed a comprehensive restoration in preparation for its centennial year in 2026. The project preserved the resort's Spanish Colonial Revival heritage with contemporary enhancements.

Renovations covered the lobby, refreshed casitas and villas, and introduced the adults-only PLUNGE at the Renker Pool. The Grove an open area next to the historic Morgan House was enhanced for weddings and gatherings, and Morgan's in the Desert, the resort's signature restaurant, received an update.

== Waldorf Astoria Affiliation ==
In January 2006, Hilton Hotels, Inc. launched a new luxury collection branded as the Waldorf Astoria Collection, leveraging the prestige of its iconic flagship, the Waldorf-Astoria New York. La Quinta Resort & Club was among the inaugural properties to join this collection, along with Grand Wailea and Arizona Biltmore, under management contracts acquired from KSL Resorts by Hilton Hotels Corporation and owned at the time by CNL Hotels & Resorts. As of late 2006, the resort featured approximately 800 guestrooms, 23 tennis courts, 41 swimming pools, seven restaurants (including the newly opened Twenty 6), and 90 holes of championship golf, highlighting its status as a premier luxury destination within the Collection.

== Sports and events ==
From 1981–1986, the resort's tennis club hosted the men's professional tournament that later became the BNP Paribas Open; singles champions during the La Quinta years included Jimmy Connors, Yannick Noah, José Higueras and Joakim Nyström. The tournament moved to Indian Wells in 1987 after outgrowing the venue.

The resort is part of the annual The American Express rotation on the PGA Tour, with the Stadium and Nicklaus Tournament courses at PGA West and La Quinta Country Club serving as host venues.

== In popular culture ==
Film director Frank Capra was a frequent guest; contemporary accounts and local histories note he worked on screenplays while staying at the resort.

In July 2020, ABC reality dating show The Bachelorette began filming its sixteenth season at La Quinta Resort & Club, as hotels in California were closed due to the COVID-19 pandemic in California.

The Food Network's cannabis-themed cooking competition series Chopped 420 was filmed on location at La Quinta Resort in early 2021.

In January 2024, the resort hosted ABC's televised special The Golden Wedding, celebrating The Golden Bachelor contestants Gerry Turner and Theresa Nist.

Parts of the 2022 psychological thriller film Don't Worry Darling, directed by Olivia Wilde, were filmed on location at La Quinta Resort.

Scenes from the reality TV series The Real Housewives of Beverly Hills were filmed in Old Town La Quinta, in close proximity to the resort. The area's scenic charm has attracted multiple television productions, with the city tour page noting both The Bachelorette and Chopped 420 alongside this show as highlights of Hollywood activity in La Quinta's entertainment scene.

== Awards and accolades ==
=== 2025 ===
- Best Hotels – U.S. News & World Report – Ranked among the Best Hotels in Palm Springs and California.
- Best Resorts – U.S. News & World Report – Recognized among the Best Resorts in Palm Springs.
- Best Desert Getaway – Modern Luxury San Diego – Named Best Desert Getaway in Best of the City 2025.
- Best Hotel & Resort Amenities – Palm Springs Life Best of the Best 2025.
- Best Spa – Palm Springs Life Best of the Best 2025 – Spa La Quinta.
- Best Golf Resorts in the U.S. – Golf Digest – Listed in America's Best Golf Resorts 2025.
- Best Golf Resorts in the United States – Golfbreaks.
- Best Golf Resorts in California – Golfbreaks.
- Best Golf Resorts in Southern California – Golfbreaks.
- Best Pickleball Resorts – Destination Pickleball – Listed among the Top 10 Best Pickleball Resorts in California.

=== 2024 ===
- Best Hotels – U.S. News & World Report – Ranked #6 in Best Palm Springs Hotels.
- Best Hotel & Resort Amenities – Palm Springs Life Best of the Best 2024.
- Best Spa – Palm Springs Life Best of the Best 2024 – Spa La Quinta.
- Best West Hotels – Meetings Today Best of Awards 2024.

=== 2023 ===
- Best Hotels – U.S. News & World Report – Ranked #8 in Best Palm Springs Hotels.
- Most Beautiful Tennis Courts in the World – Architectural Digest – La Quinta's Center Court ranked #10.
- Top Tennis Resorts in Southern California – All Points Tennis – Ranked #6.
- 10 Best Dog-Friendly Destinations – The Points Guy.

=== 2022 ===
- 11 Best Southwest Desert Escapes – Modern Luxury San Diego.
- Wellness Travel Guide 2022 – Organic Spa Magazine.
- Best Hotel Pool – Palm Springs Life Best of the Best 2022.
- Best West Hotels – Meetings Today Best of Awards 2022.

=== 2021 ===
- Four Diamond Award – AAA.
- Best Golf Resorts in Southern California – Golfbreaks.

=== 2020 ===
- Gay Travel Awards – Golf Category – GayTravel.com.
