= Forme Tour =

Professional golf tour

- Sport: Golf
- Founded: 2021
- Founder: PGA Tour
- First season: 2021
- Folded: 2021
- Country: Based in the United States
- Related competitions: PGA Tour Canada
- Website: https://www.pgatour.com/canada/en_us.html

The Forme Tour was a men's professional golf tour played in the United States. The tour was created by the PGA Tour in 2021 in response to COVID-19 pandemic related restrictions on travel between the United States and Canada, in order to provide competition for non-Canadian PGA Tour Canada members, with entry also available through a series seven of Q-School events. Eight tournaments were initially announced, to be held between June and September. The tournaments offered Official World Golf Ranking points, and the top five players on the points list at the end of the season gained Korn Ferry Tour membership for the 2022 season.

The tour was sponsored by Forme, a clothing company.

A separate tour, the 2021 PGA Tour Canada, was run for Canadian-based professionals. This tour also consisted of eight events.

The schedule consisted of eight tournaments; four sets of back-to-back events played on successive weeks, finishing on either a Friday or a Saturday.

== 2021 season ==
=== Schedule ===
2021 Forme Tour season
- Duration: June 23, 2021 – September 10, 2021
- Number of official events: 8
- Points list: (United States) Trevor Werbylo

The following table lists official events during the 2021 season.

Date	Tournament	Location	Purse (US$)	Winner (Note: The number in parentheses after each winner's name is the number of Forme Tour events they had won up to and including that tournament.)	OWGR points
Jun 26	L&J Golf Championship	Georgia	115,000	(United States) Samuel Saunders (1)	6
Jul 3	Auburn University Club Invitational	Alabama	115,000	(United States) Philip Knowles (1)	6
Jul 23	Bolingbrook Golf Club Invitational	Illinois	115,000	(United States) Mac Meissner (1)	6
Jul 31	Birck Boilermaker Classic	Indiana	115,000	(United States) Turk Pettit (1)	6
Aug 13	Fuzzy Zoeller Classic	Indiana	115,000	(United States) Trevor Werbylo (1)	6
Aug 21	Forme Open	Ohio	115,000	(United States) Corey Shaun (1)	6
Sep 4	Rolling Green Championship	Pennsylvania	115,000	(United States) Andrew Yun (1)	6
Sep 10	Forme Tour Championship	New Jersey	115,000	(United States) Brad Miller (1)	6

=== Points list ===
The points list was based on tournament results during the season, calculated using a points-based system. The top five players on the tour earned status to play on the 2022 Korn Ferry Tour.

Position	Player	Points
1	(United States) Trevor Werbylo	981
2	(United States) Corey Shaun	945
3	(United States) Turk Pettit	802
4	(United States) Andrew Yun	781
5	(United States) Mac Meissner	718
