= Rolling Green Golf Club =

- Location within Pennsylvania
- 39°56′45″N 75°20′18″W

Club information
- Location: Springfield Township, Pennsylvania
- Established: 1926
- Type: Private
- Total holes: 18
- Tournaments: 1976 U.S. Women's Open; 2016 U.S. Women's Amateur
- Website: https://www.rggc.org
- Designed by: William Flynn
- Par: 70 (black tees)
- Length: 6,941 yards (6,347 m)
- Course rating: 74.7
- Slope rating: 143
- Course record: Jeremy Paul, Byron Meth: 63
- Par: 71 (blue, white, yellow, red tees)
- Length: 6,695 yards (6,122 m) (blue tees)
- Course rating: 73.7 (blue tees)
- Slope rating: 140 (blue tees)
- Course record: Huey Crawford, James Bresnahan: 62 (white tees)

Rolling Green Golf Club is a William Flynn designed golf course located in Springfield Township, Delaware County, Pennsylvania. Founded to be a "golf club meant for golfers", Rolling Green has always proudly been a golf-only facility, without country club frivolities such as tennis or swimming. It opened for play in 1926. Rolling Green was ranked the 9th best golf course in Pennsylvania by Golf.com.

== Tournaments at Rolling Green ==
=== Major championships ===
Year	Tournament	Winner
1976	U.S. Women's Open	(United States) JoAnne Carner

=== Amateur championships ===
Year	Tournament	Winner
2016	U.S. Women's Amateur	Seong Eun-jeong

2025	Ivy League Men's Golf Championship	Princeton University

=== Other championships ===
Year	Tournament	Winner
2021	PGA Forme Tour - Rolling Green Championship	Andrew Yun

== Scorecard ==
Rolling Green
Tee	Rating/Slope	1	2	3	4	5	6	7	8	9	Out	10	11	12	13	14	15	16	17	18	In	Total
Black	74.7/143	419	450	175	394	426	207	515	444	617	3647	258	450	361	442	235	384	170	501	493	3294	6941
Blue	73.7/140	404	433	167	378	372	190	501	425	605	3475	244	431	361	434	203	384	163	473	527	3220	6695
White	72.3/134	389	411	157	353	359	178	493	403	561	3304	210	426	340	395	195	359	150	460	514	3049	6353
Yellow	69.7/129	364	386	141	318	332	155	456	366	520	3038	194	385	303	365	150	345	129	443	449	2763	5801
Par		4	4	3	4	4	3	5	4	5	36	3	4	4	4	3	4	3	5	5/4	35/34	71/70
SI		7	5	17	9	11	15	13	3	1		10	8	16	2	6	4	18	14	12
Red	72.8/132	352	379	137	311	319	146	449	346	514	2953	186	378	271	358	88	329	124	412	441	2587	5540
Par		4	4	3	4	4	3	5	4	5	36	3	4	4	4	3	4	3	5	5	35	71
SI		9	5	17	13	11	15	7	3	1		16	10	12	2	18	4	14	6	8
