= Sahalee Players Championship =

Amateur golf tournament

The Sahalee Players Championship is an annual amateur golf tournament. It has been played since 1992 at the Sahalee Country Club in Sammamish, Washington. The event was not played from 2020 to 2022 and returned in 2023 as a collegiate event.

== Winners ==
Year	Individual	Team	Ref
2026	Finn Koelle	Oklahoma State University	
2025	Brady Siravo	Arizona State University	
2024	Aiden Krafft	Arizona State University	
2023	Preston Summerhays	Illinois Fighting Illini men's golf	

- 2020 Canceled
- 2019 Joe Highsmith
- 2018 Cole Madey
- 2017 Sahith Theegala
- 2016 No tournament – hosted 2016 Women's PGA Championship
- 2015 Corey Pereira
- 2014 Mark Anguiano
- 2013 Andrew Yun
- 2012 Kevin Penner
- 2011 Chris Williams
- 2010 Peter Uihlein
- 2009 Nick Taylor
- 2008 Trent Whitekiller
- 2007 Daniel Summerhays
- 2006 Kyle Stanley
- 2005 Travis Bertoni
- 2004 Ryan Moore
- 2003 Brien Davis
- 2002 No tournament – hosted 2002 WGC-NEC Invitational
- 2001 Jason Hartwick
- 2000 Ryan Lavoie
- 1999 Michael Harris
- 1998 No tournament – hosted 1998 PGA Championship
- 1997 Arron Oberholser
- 1996 Jason Gore
- 1995 David Lebeck
- 1994 Chris Stutts
- 1993 Casey Martin
- 1992 Doug Duchateau
