= Thorny Lea Golf Club =

Country club in Massachusetts, U.S.

Coordinates: 42°04′26″N 71°02′58″W

Thorny Lea Golf Club is a private country club in Brockton, Massachusetts founded in 1900. The current club structure was built in 1900. It has a clubhouse with many features. This is an 18-hole golf course with a 70 par.
