= Atlanta Junior Golf Association =

Golf association in Atlanta, Georgia

The Atlanta Junior Golf Association is a 501(c)(3) non-profit organization based in Atlanta, Georgia. It was established in 1974 as the Dekalb Junior Golf Association with less than 100 members and conducted approximately one dozen events. Today it boasts over 1150 members annually and, for the first time in history, hosted 100 tournaments in 2007. Most of the tournaments take place from the end of May through the end of July, followed by four (4) season-ending championships and a Fall Tournament Series of 11 events.

The Atlanta Junior Golf Association was Mike Bentley's invention, who later moved onward and upward from the Atlanta Junior Golf Association to develop the American Junior Golf Association. It is run by three full-time staff members, one USGA P.J. Boatwright, Jr. Intern and one summer communications intern. It is governed by a board of directors made up of men and women from the Atlanta Area who are golf enthusiasts and junior golf supporters.

== Mission ==
The purpose of Atlanta Junior Golf is to provide an environment where a junior golfer, male or female ages 7–18, can enjoy golf and progress at his or her own rate from beginner to a proficient level while promoting and preserving the traditions and integrity of the game.

== Membership ==
Membership is open to junior golfers between the ages of 7 and 18 years who have not yet turned 19 and have not yet started college. All members must pay an annual, non-refundable membership fee which gives them access to all Atlanta Junior Golf tournaments and special events.

Membership is divided into skill levels. Juniors may choose from Beginner, 9-Hole Club, 9-Hole Open, 18-Hole Club and 18-Hole Open Divisions. Within each of these divisions are separate age groups, thus ensuring each junior is always competing with other players of a similar age and ability.

Several current members of the PGA, LPGA and NCAA golf programs are alums of Atlanta Junior Golf, including LPGA Tour player Angela Jerman, former University of Georgia standout and 2007 Ben Hogan Award winner Chris Kirk and former Auburn University golfer Margaret Shirley.

== Special events ==
Atlanta Junior Golf conducts several special events throughout the year, starting in January with 'College Day'. Atlanta area college coaches generously volunteer their Saturday morning to offer guidance to college hopefuls. Topics covered include golf resumes, NCAA Rules & Regulations, time management, college recruiting, and other related issues.

In the spring, Atlanta Junior Golf conducts rules seminars which first and second year members must attend. The Georgia Junior Four-Ball is also conducted in the spring.

The summer tournament series culminates in four championships: the Beginner Open, Club Championship, 9-Hole Classic and Grand Championship.

Juniors who participate in the 'Beginner Division' are invited to play in the year-end Beginner Open.

The Club Championship is an invitational event for juniors who participated in 9-Hole or 18-Hole Club Divisions. 9-Hole players play in a one-day championship and 18-Hole players get the taste of two-day championship.

The 9-Hole Classic is a two-day championship for juniors from the 9-Hole Open Division. Each day consists of 9 holes with First, Second and Third place being awarded upon completion of the second day's round. This event is typically held at Ansley Golf Club in Atlanta.

Grand Championship is another invitational tournament, hosted for qualifiers from the 18-Hole Open Division. The Grand Championship is a three-day, 54-hole tournament that has been held at many different golf courses from Sea Palms to Chateau Elan Callaway Gardens. Winning the Overall Girls Championship or the Overall Boys Championship is the highest award for an Atlanta Junior Golf Member.

The Fall Tournament Series is conducted over the fall months and was originally designed to offer juniors more local events in golf's general 'off season'. One-day and multi-day events are offered in this series.

The Atlanta-Kauai Team Challenge is a match play event between Atlanta Junior Golf and the Kauai Junior Golf Association from Kauai, Hawaii. This event pits 16 juniors from Atlanta against 16 juniors from Kauai and alternates between Atlanta and Kauai for the host location. This event usually ends up being as much, if not more, of a cultural exchange than a golf tournament.

The Georgia Cup is another match play event that is contested between the Atlanta, Augusta, Columbus and Savannah Junior Golf Associations. This event is played in the fall over a Saturday and Sunday and consists of 8 representatives from each association playing match play against each other. In 16 years, Atlanta Junior Golf has been Georgia Cup Champions 14 times.

== Awards ==
Atlanta Junior Golf hosts an Annual Awards Banquet at Druid Hills Golf Club every fall. Several awards are presented at this event including the following:

- All-AJG Teams (composed of top ten players in Open Divisions and top five players in Club Divisions)
- Player of the Year (the top point winner in each Open Division)
- All-Academic Team (high school students with a GPA of 3.5 of higher who submit transcripts by August 1)
- Most Improved Male & Female (most improved stroke average from prior year to current year)
- Most Improved Award (most improved stroke average from juniors awarded scholarships)
- Aroha "Roh" Wezner Award (18-Hole Open Division player with the lowest scoring average from the Summer Series)
- Male Sportsmanship Award (voted on by Atlanta Junior Golf staff members)
- Female Sportsmanship Award (voted on by Atlanta Junior Golf staff members)
- GSGA Handicap Super Poster Award (A certificate presented by the Georgia State Golf Association to those junior golfers who post at least 25 scores from rounds played)
- GSGA Most Improved Award (A certificate presented by the Georgia State Golf Association to the junior(s) in each division whose handicap improves the most during the Summer Series)
- MAADA Award (junior golfer with most points after championships)
- Junior Golf Ambassador Award (awarded to an individual or group who contribute to the advancement of junior golf)

== Partners ==
Atlanta Junior Golf relies on corporate partnership to ensure costs to members are kept low. Atlanta Junior Golf thanks the following partners:

Presenting Partner

- Metro Atlanta Automobile Dealer's Association

Major Partners

- Mizuno USA, Inc.
- Dogwood Invitational
- United States Golf Association
- Bridgestone Golf
- Publix Charities

== On The Web ==
- Official Website
- Golf Polo Shirts
- Authority on Rules for Golf
