= La Quinta, California =

- City
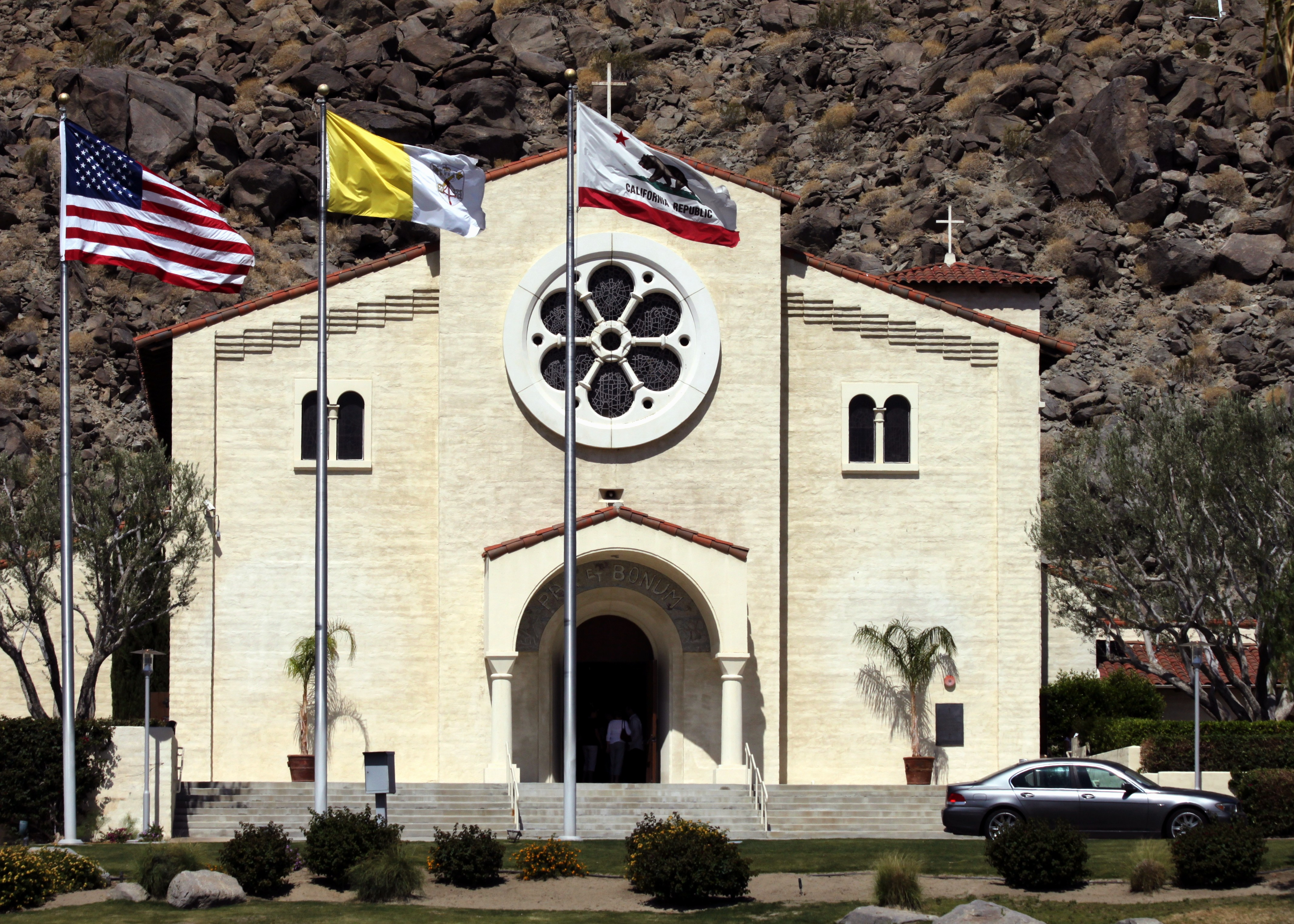
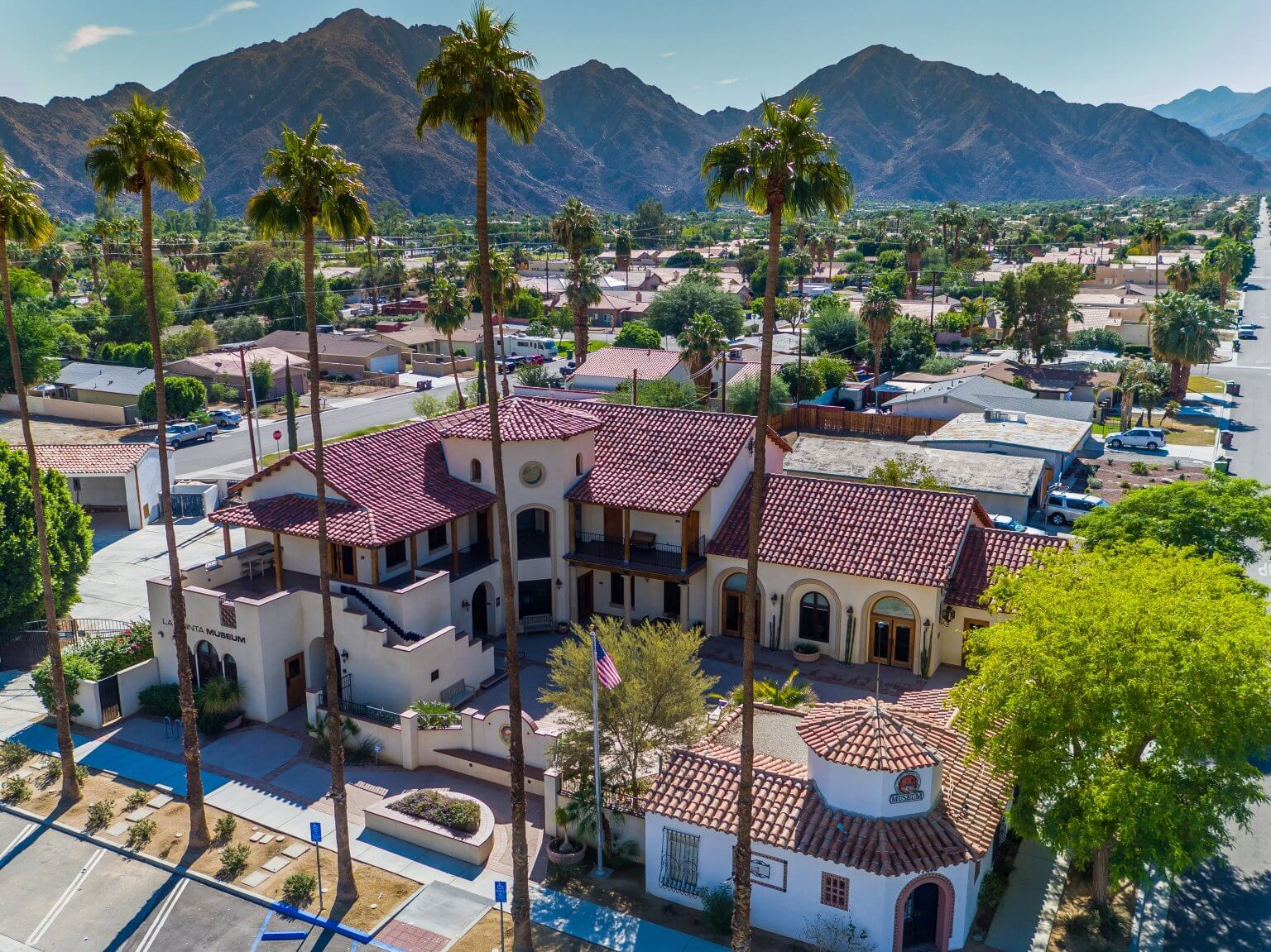
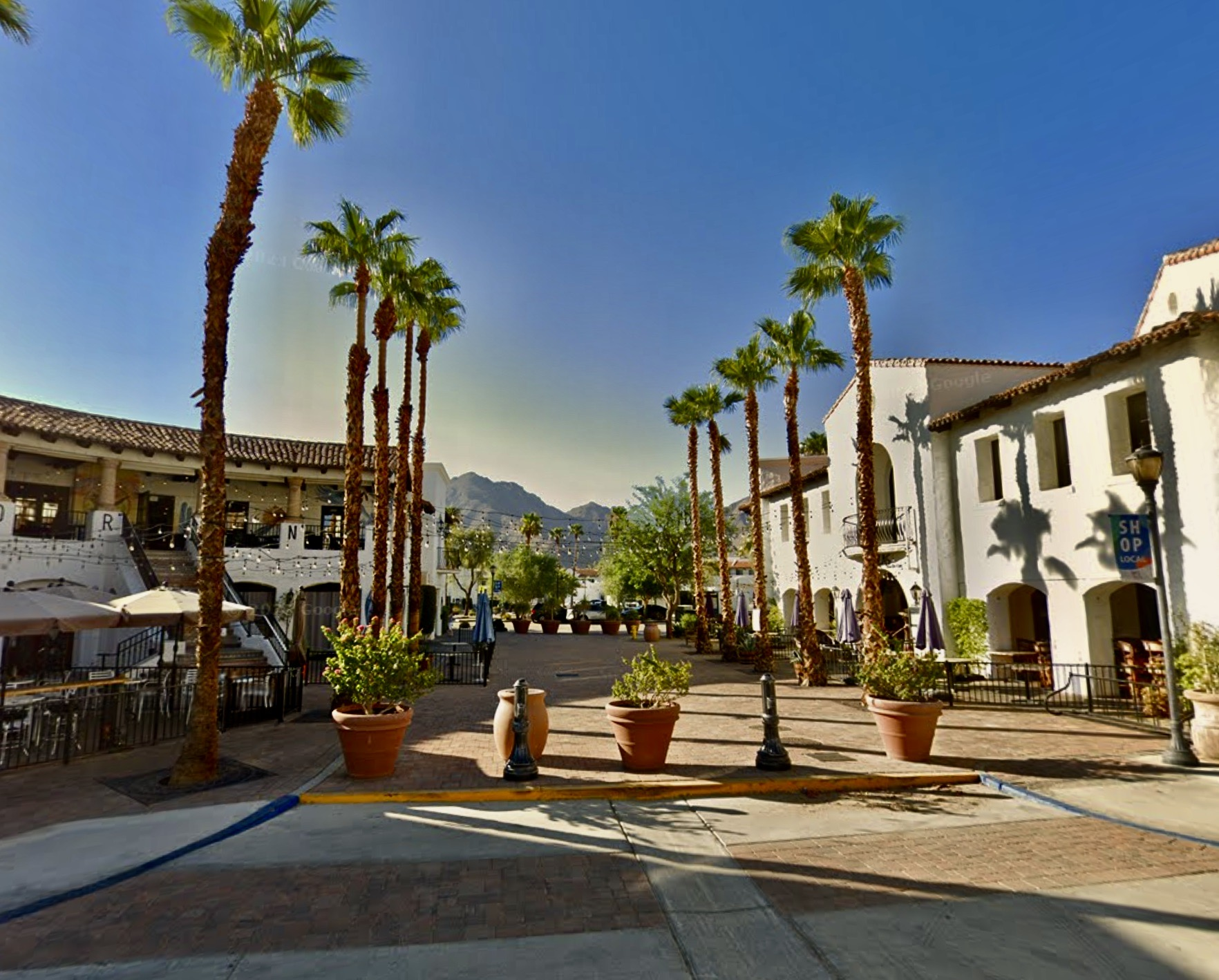
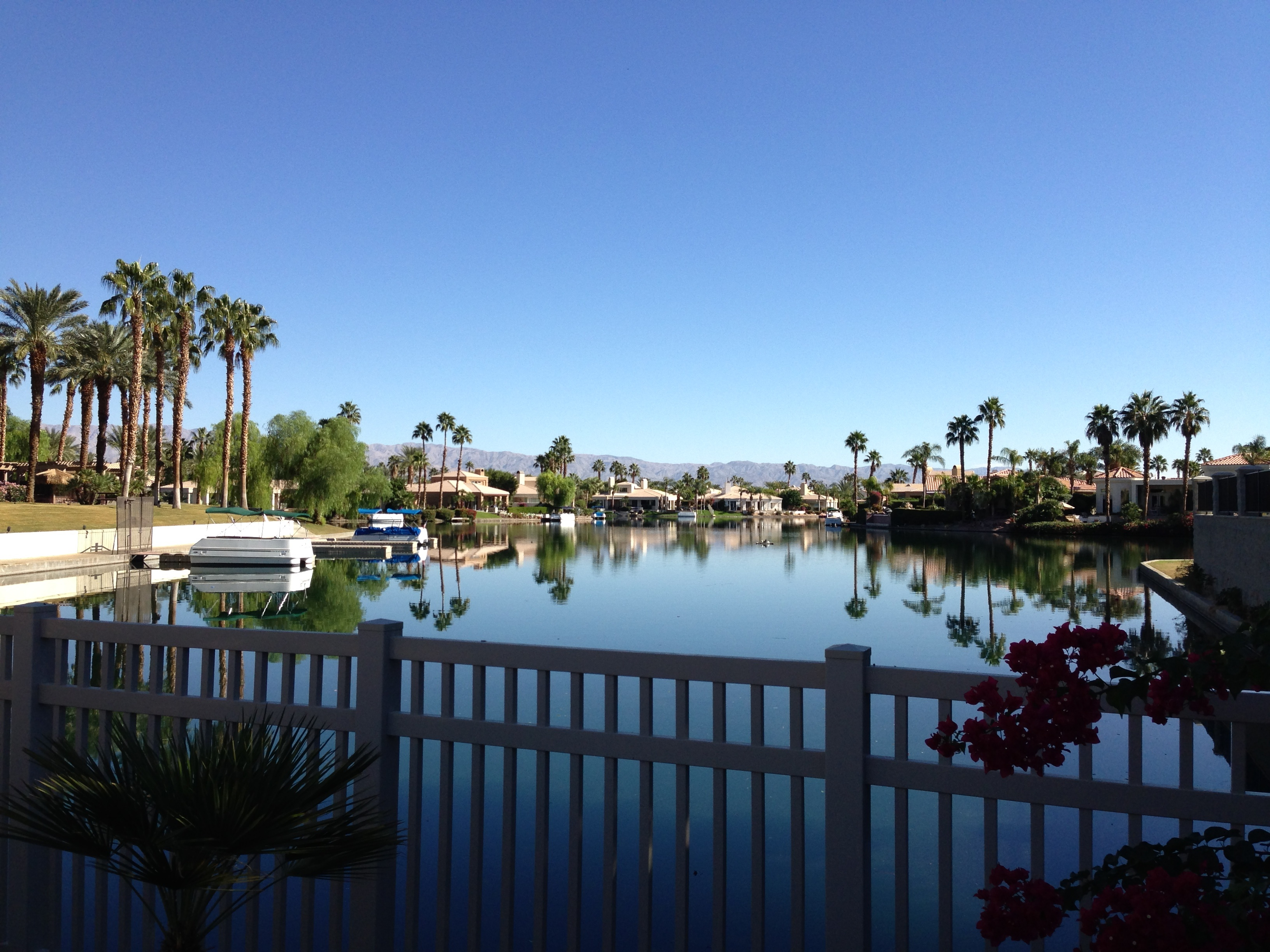
- St. Francis Church La Quinta Museum Old Town La Quinta Lake La Quinta

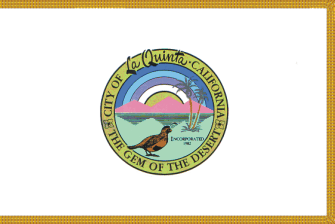
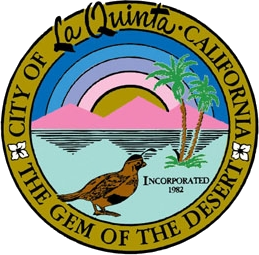
- Flag Seal
- Motto: The Gem of the Desert
- Interactive map of La Quinta, California
- Location in the United States
- Coordinates: 33°40′31″N 116°17′51″W
- Country: United States
- State: California
- County: Riverside
- Incorporated: May 1, 1982

Government
  - Type: Council–manager
  - Mayor: Linda Evans
  - Mayor Pro Tem: Kathleen Fitzpatrick
  - City Council: John Pena; Steve Sanchez; Deborah McGarrey

Area
  - Total: 35.68 sq mi (92.42 km^{2})
  - Land: 35.26 sq mi (91.32 km^{2})
  - Water: 0.42 sq mi (1.10 km^{2}) 1.22%
- Elevation: 135 ft (41 m)

Population (2020)
  - Total: 37,558
  - Density: 1,184.1/sq mi (457.17/km^{2})
- Time zone: UTC-8 (Pacific)
  - Summer (DST): UTC-7 (PDT)
- ZIP code: 92253
- Area code: 442/760
- FIPS code: 06-40354
- GNIS feature IDs: 1660870, 2411582
- Website: laquintaca.gov

La Quinta (Spanish for "the country estate") is a desert resort city in Riverside County, California, United States. Located between Indian Wells and Indio, it is one of the nine cities of the Coachella Valley. The population was 37,558 at the 2020 census, up from 37,467 at the 2010 census.

Golf courses include La Quinta Resort and Club, a resort dating to 1926, where director Frank Capra wrote the screenplay for Lost Horizon, and SilverRock Golf Resort, which hosts the annual Bob Hope Chrysler Classic PGA golf tournament.

== History ==
The Cahuilla Indians were the first inhabitants of La Quinta.

In 1926, Walter Morgan established the La Quinta Resort at the northern section of Marshall Cove as a type of secluded hideaway for Hollywood's celebrities and socialites. The Resort was the site for the Coachella Valley's first golf course, coinciding with the construction and pavement of State Route 111 in the 1930s. Further expansion of Washington Street in the 1950s and 1960s connected La Quinta with US Highways 60 and 99 (became Interstate 10 in the 1970s).

As nearby desert cities grew to capacity, La Quinta's growth rose dramatically by the mid-1980s, which led to its incorporation as a city in Riverside County in 1982. In the 1980 census, La Quinta had 4,200 residents, then increased to 11,215 by 1990 in the city's early phases of residential area growth. It was predominantly a part-time community until around that time.

== Geography ==
According to the United States Census Bureau, the city has a total area of 35.6 square miles (92 km^{2}), of which 35.1 square miles (91 km^{2}) is land and 0.4 square miles (1.0 km^{2}) (1.22%) is water. The city's elevation is 56 feet (20 m) above sea level.

La Quinta is located on the floor of the Coachella Valley, and is surrounded on three sides by the Santa Rosa Mountains. As the floor of the valley sank, it was covered by the Pacific Ocean. Silt deposits from the flow of the Colorado River into the Gulf of California caused the basin to be cut off from the ocean. Five hundred years ago, the Colorado River changed its course and the eastern Coachella Valley flooded, leading to the creation of the historic Lake Cahuilla (a distinct lake from the man-made reservoir that exists today), which was fresh water.

=== Climate ===
The climate of the Coachella Valley is influenced by the surrounding geography. High mountain ranges on three sides contribute to its unique and year-round warm climate, with some of the warmest winters west of the Rocky Mountains. La Quinta has a warm winter/hot summer climate: Its average annual high temperature is 89.5 °F (31.9 °C) and average annual low is 62.1 °F (16.7 °C) but summer highs above 108 °F (42 °C) are common and sometimes exceed 120 °F (49 °C), while summer night lows often stay above 82 °F (28 °C). Winters are warm with daytime highs often between 68 and 86 °F (20 and 30 °C). Under 4 inches (100 mm) of annual precipitation are average, with over 348 days of sunshine per year. The hottest temperature ever recorded there was 125 °F (52 °C) on July 6, 1905. The mean annual temperature is 75.8 °F (24.3 °C).

Climate data for La Quinta, California, elev. 10 feet (3.0 m) (1981–2010)
Month	Jan	Feb	Mar	Apr	May	Jun	Jul	Aug	Sep	Oct	Nov	Dec	Year
Record high °F (°C)	97 (36)	100 (38)	103 (39)	109 (43)	117 (47)	123 (51)	125 (52)	121 (49)	122 (50)	115 (46)	101 (38)	93 (34)	125 (52)
Mean daily maximum °F (°C)	72.0 (22.2)	75.3 (24.1)	81.3 (27.4)	87.5 (30.8)	95.7 (35.4)	103.1 (39.5)	107.3 (41.8)	106.6 (41.4)	102.0 (38.9)	91.9 (33.3)	79.6 (26.4)	71.0 (21.7)	89.5 (31.9)
Daily mean °F (°C)	58.3 (14.6)	61.6 (16.4)	68.1 (20.1)	74.1 (23.4)	81.7 (27.6)	88.6 (31.4)	93.8 (34.3)	93.4 (34.1)	88.0 (31.1)	77.8 (25.4)	65.7 (18.7)	57.6 (14.2)	75.8 (24.3)
Mean daily minimum °F (°C)	44.6 (7.0)	48.0 (8.9)	54.8 (12.7)	60.7 (15.9)	67.7 (19.8)	74.2 (23.4)	80.3 (26.8)	80.3 (26.8)	74.0 (23.3)	63.7 (17.6)	51.8 (11.0)	44.2 (6.8)	62.1 (16.7)
Record low °F (°C)	13 (−11)	20 (−7)	25 (−4)	33 (1)	38 (3)	45 (7)	59 (15)	56 (13)	46 (8)	31 (−1)	23 (−5)	19 (−7)	13 (−11)
Average precipitation inches (mm)	0.56 (14)	0.64 (16)	0.43 (11)	0.05 (1.3)	0.07 (1.8)	0.01 (0.25)	0.04 (1.0)	0.54 (14)	0.04 (1.0)	0.26 (6.6)	0.18 (4.6)	0.62 (16)	3.44 (87)
Source: www.ncdc.noaa.gov

== Demographics ==
Historical population
Census	Pop.	Note	%±
1980	3,328		—
1990	11,215		237.0%
2000	23,694		111.3%
2010	37,467		58.1%
2020	37,558		0.2%
U.S. Decennial Census; 1860–1870 1880-1890; 1900 1910 1920; 1930 1940 1950; 1960 1970 1980; 1990 2000 2010; 2020

=== Racial and ethnic composition ===
La Quinta city, California – Racial and ethnic composition Note: the US Census treats Hispanic/Latino as an ethnic category. This table excludes Latinos from the racial categories and assigns them to a separate category. Hispanics/Latinos may be of any race.
Race / Ethnicity (NH = Non-Hispanic)	Pop 1980	Pop 1990	Pop 2000	Pop 2010	Pop 2020	% 1980	% 1990	% 2000	% 2010	% 2020
White alone (NH)	2,705	7,817	14,893	23,648	21,040	81.28%	69.70%	62.86%	63.12%	56.02%
Black or African American alone (NH)	51	188	296	607	636	1.53%	1.68%	1.25%	1.62%	1.69%
Native American or Alaska Native alone (NH)	35	94	95	98	124	1.05%	0.84%	0.40%	0.26%	0.33%
Asian alone (NH)	21	147	401	1,093	1,464	0.63%	1.31%	1.69%	2.92%	3.90%
Native Hawaiian or Pacific Islander alone (NH)	21	147	19	25	45	0.63%	1.31%	0.08%	0.07%	0.12%
Other race alone (NH)	-	25	11	62	177	-	0.22%	0.05%	0.17%	0.47%
Mixed race or Multiracial (NH)	x	x	395	595	1,220	x	x	1.67%	1.59%	3.25%
Hispanic or Latino (any race)	516	2,944	7,584	11,339	12,852	15.50%	26.25%	32.01%	30.26%	34.22%
Total	3,328	11,215	23,694	37,467	37,558	100.00%	100.00%	100.00%	100.00%	100.00%

=== 2020 census ===
As of the 2020 census, La Quinta had a population of 37,558 and a population density of 1,065.2 inhabitants per square mile (411.3/km^{2}). The median age was 51.8 years. 17.0% of residents were under the age of 18, 6.9% were aged 18 to 24, 18.6% were aged 25 to 44, 27.3% were aged 45 to 64, and 30.2% were 65 years of age or older. For every 100 females, there were 91.0 males, and for every 100 females age 18 and over there were 88.7 males age 18 and over.

The census reported that 99.8% of the population lived in households, 0.1% lived in non-institutionalized group quarters, and 0.1% were institutionalized. Separately, 99.3% of residents lived in urban areas, while 0.7% lived in rural areas.

There were 15,706 households, of which 22.4% had children under the age of 18 living in them. Of all households, 53.4% were married-couple households, 6.2% were cohabiting couple households, 14.2% were households with a male householder and no spouse or partner present, and 26.2% were households with a female householder and no spouse or partner present. About 25.8% of all households were made up of individuals, and 15.1% had someone living alone who was 65 years of age or older. The average household size was 2.39. There were 10,705 families (68.2% of all households).

There were 23,464 housing units at an average density of 665.5 units per square mile (257.0 units/km^{2}), of which 15,706 (66.9%) were occupied and 7,758 (33.1%) were vacant. Of occupied units, 73.4% were owner-occupied and 26.6% were occupied by renters. The homeowner vacancy rate was 2.7% and the rental vacancy rate was 12.0%.

The 2020 racial and ethnic composition of the city is shown in the table above.

=== 2023 ACS estimates ===
In 2023, the US Census Bureau estimated that the median household income was $97,628, and the per capita income was $62,742. About 5.9% of families and 9.1% of the population were below the poverty line.

=== 2010 census ===
The 2010 United States census reported that La Quinta had a population of 37,467. The population density was 1,053.9 inhabitants per square mile (406.9/km^{2}). The racial makeup of La Quinta was 29,489 (78.7%) White (63.1% Non-Hispanic White), 713 (1.9%) African American, 230 (0.6%) Native American, 1,176 (3.1%) Asian, 41 (0.1%) Pacific Islander, 4,595 (12.3%) from other races, and 1,223 (3.3%) from two or more races. Hispanic or Latino of any race were 11,339 persons (30.3%).

The Census reported that 37,410 people (99.8% of the population) lived in households, 50 (0.1%) lived in non-institutionalized group quarters, and 7 (0%) were institutionalized.

There were 14,820 households, out of which 4,329 (29.2%) had children under the age of 18 living in them, 8,672 (58.5%) were opposite-sex married couples living together, 1,442 (9.7%) had a female householder with no husband present, 595 (4.0%) had a male householder with no wife present. There were 787 (5.3%) unmarried opposite-sex partnerships, and 182 (1.2%) same-sex married couples or partnerships. 3,164 households (21.3%) were made up of individuals, and 1,522 (10.3%) had someone living alone who was 65 years of age or older. The average household size was 2.52. There were 10,709 families (72.3% of all households); the average family size was 2.93.

The population was spread out, with 8,208 people (21.9%) under the age of 18, 2,509 people (6.7%) aged 18 to 24, 7,696 people (20.5%) aged 25 to 44, 11,238 people (30.0%) aged 45 to 64, and 7,816 people (20.9%) who were 65 years of age or older. The median age was 45.6 years. For every 100 females, there were 93.5 males. For every 100 females age 18 and over, there were 91.3 males.

There were 23,489 housing units at an average density of 660.7 per square mile (255.1/km^{2}), of which 11,152 (75.2%) were owner-occupied, and 3,668 (24.8%) were occupied by renters. The homeowner vacancy rate was 6.5%; the rental vacancy rate was 16.5%. 27,386 people (73.1% of the population) lived in owner-occupied housing units and 10,024 people (26.8%) lived in rental housing units.

According to the 2010 United States census, La Quinta had a median household income of $72,099, with 8.0% of the population living below the federal poverty line.

=== Other demographic data ===
La Quinta has developed a culturally diverse community, as large ancestry groups include Mexicans (the largest) and Mexican Americans who frequently came to the Palm Springs area/Coachella Valley to find available employment in the 1990s and 2000s. Others, in alphabetical order, include: Armenians, Bosnians, British, French, Germans, Italians, Poles and Jews of multiple nationalities.

Seasonal population known as "snowbirds" from coastal Southern California, Northern California, the Pacific Northwest, the Midwest, and Canada increase the local population by 20-50 percent in the cooler months from November to April. A large percentage of seasonal residents are senior citizens. There are also several RV or mobile home parks in La Quinta with many seasonal residents, common throughout the eastern portion of the Coachella Valley.

Like the rest of the "East Valley" including nearby communities of Indio, Coachella, and unincorporated communities of Bermuda Dunes and Vista Santa Rosa, there is a growing Latino (especially Mexican-American and Central American nationalities) as well an enlarged African American and Asian American (i.e. east Asians) population belonging to the middle and upper-middle class.

According to the United States Hispanic Chamber of Commerce, estimates placed Latinos at half (about 50% to 60%) of the local population of the whole Coachella Valley region, Blacks at near or over 10% and Asians at 10–15% of the city population as of the year 2010. Most of the minorities are recently moved-in families sought starter homes and/or relocated from urban centers of Southern California during the 1990s and 2000s, and from families of two or more races (to represent multiracial identity).

== Economy ==
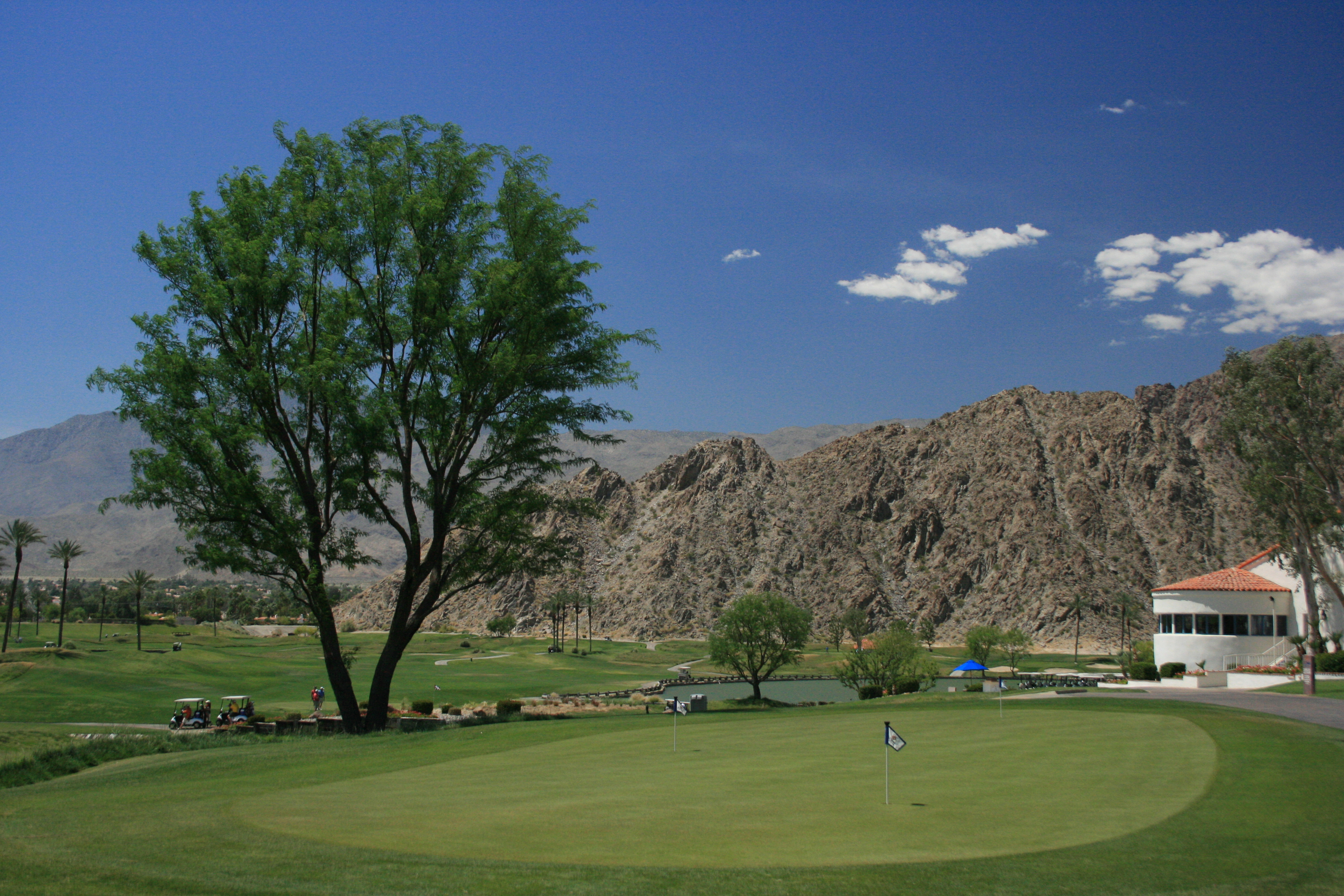
La Quinta Country Club

=== Service industries ===
La Quinta is the site of the first Wal-Mart Supercenter in California. Many residents work for the tourist industries in hotels, resorts, golf courses, and nearby casinos. Service industry jobs relate to the construction, hotel, landscaping, and retail industries. La Quinta has sought to attract professional businesses, and has benefited from neighboring cities' growth. The city's downtown commercial district is officially known as The Village. The Village District includes private commercial developments such as Old Town and Plaza Calle Tampico, and contain professional offices, the city museum, small tourist-oriented shops and boutiques, and restaurants. Old Town La Quinta is a commercial real estate development of 30 cafes, shops, boutiques, salons, services, and offices.

=== Top employers ===
According to La Quinta's 2020 Comprehensive Annual Financial Report, the top employers in the city were:

#	Employer	# of Employees
1	Desert Sands Unified School District	2,852
2	La Quinta Resort & Club/PGA West	1,412
3	Walmart Supercenter	300
4	Costco	290
5	The Home Depot	212
6	Target	180
7	Lowe's	150
8	Imperial Irrigation District	134
9	Traditions Golf Club	120
10	In-N-Out Burger	84

== Arts and culture ==
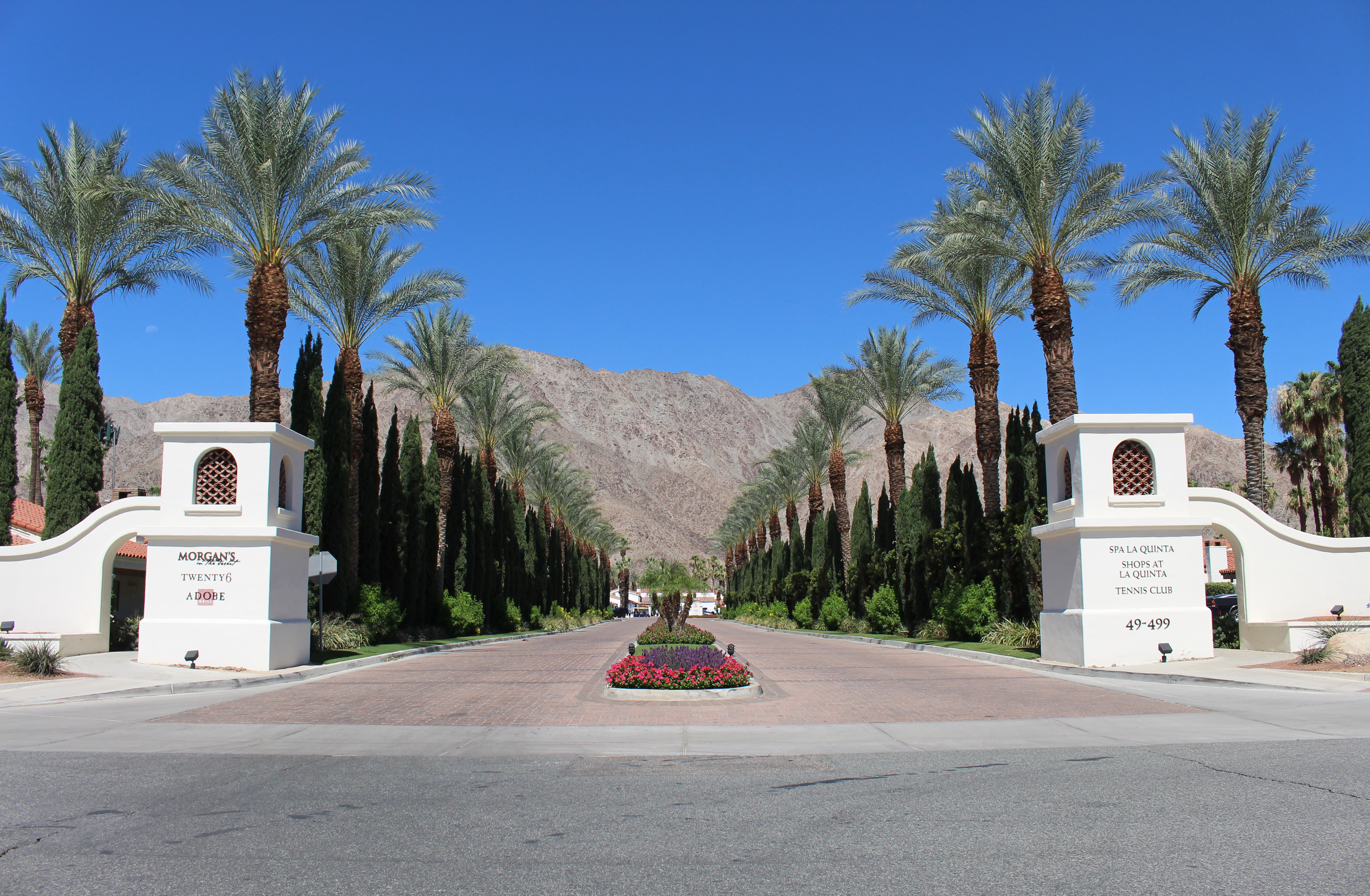
La Quinta Resort & Club

The city opened a public library that commenced operations in 2005. La Quinta annually plays host to a four-day event known as the "La Quinta Art Celebration" at the scenic La Quinta Civic Center Park. A certified local farmers market is hosted at Old Town La Quinta. Old Town also hosts "Art on Main Street".

== Parks and recreation ==
La Quinta has 20 parks within the city. Lake Cahuilla Regional Park is a Riverside County park located just south of the city.

== Government ==
In the California State Legislature, La Quinta is in the 19th senatorial district, represented by Republican Rosilicie Ochoa Bogh, and in the 47th Assembly district, represented by Republican Greg Wallis.

In the United States House of Representatives, La Quinta is in California's 41st congressional district, represented by Republican Ken Calvert.

== Education ==
The Desert Sands Unified School District serves a majority of La Quinta, while the Coachella Valley Unified School District serves a segment in the eastern portion of the city.

Public schools directly within the city limits include:

- Harry S. Truman Elementary School
- Benjamin Franklin Elementary School
- La Quinta Middle School
- Colonel Mitchell Paige Middle School
- La Quinta High School, an IB World School

Students in north La Quinta are also zoned to the following Desert Sands Unified schools which are near, or directly across in the case of Earhart and Glenn, from the city borders:

- Amelia Earhart Elementary School, Indio
- Gerald R. Ford Elementary School, Indian Wells
- John Glenn Middle School of International Studies, Indio

=== Specialized and Alternative schools ===
- John Adams Early Childhood Education Center.
- Summit High School
- Horizon School of Independent Studies (middle and high school grade levels)

== Infrastructure ==
=== Public safety ===
Police services are provided under contract with the Riverside County Sheriff's Department through the Thermal Station, which also serves the city of Coachella and unincorporated areas of the eastern Coachella Valley.

The city of La Quinta contracts for fire and paramedic services with the Riverside County Fire Department through a cooperative agreement with CAL FIRE.

American Medical Response provides ambulance services to La Quinta

=== Transportation ===
California State Route 111, the main surface street thoroughfare in the Coachella Valley, passes through La Quinta. The city has access to Interstate 10 through the Washington Street and Jefferson Street exits.

The city hosts multiple stops for the SunLine regional transportation agency, which provides bus service in the Coachella Valley.

La Quinta is approximately a half hour drive from the Palm Springs International Airport, the main regional airport in the area with flights leaving daily to connecting airports across the United States and Canada. The city is a short drive from both the general aviation Bermuda Dunes Airport to the north, and the general aviation Jacqueline Cochran Regional Airport in unincorporated Thermal to the east.

== Notable people ==
The city has been home to a number of celebrity residents, including the late Merv Griffin. Griffin was the driving force behind the annual La Quinta Arts Festival, one of the country's leading plein air art shows, and was instrumental in the development of Griffin Ranch, an equestrian-oriented resort residential neighborhood.

- Tyler Hilton, actor and singer, attended La Quinta High School.
- Anthony Kim, professional golfer, attended La Quinta High School.
- Aubrey O'Day, singer and dancer known as a member of Danity Kane. attended La Quinta High School.
- Tommy John, longtime MLB left-handed pitcher
- Scott Burcham, a baseball player in the Colorado Rockies' organization
- Dorothy Hamill, Olympic ice figure skater
- Andy Williams, singer and TV personality, resided in La Quinta with his second wife Debbie in addition to owning a house in Branson, Missouri, where his Moon River theatre was located.
- L. Ron Hubbard, founder of Scientology, lived in secret on a ranch in La Quinta from 1978 to the early 1980s.
- Jack Jones, singer
- Jenna Ortega, actress
- The rock band Yawning Man was formed here.
