= Druid Hills Golf Club =

Private country golf club

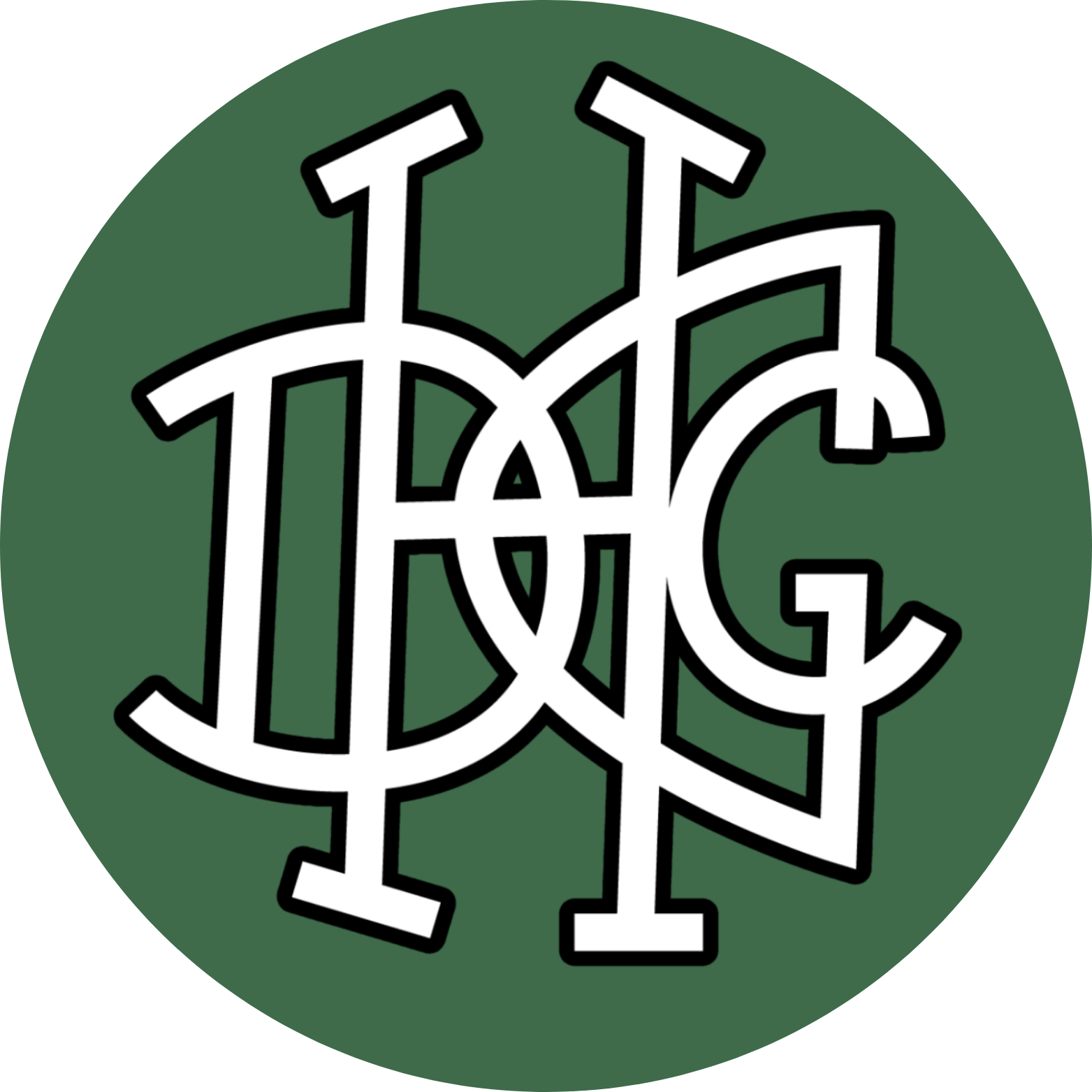

- Location within the United States Location within Georgia
- 33°46′32″N 84°19′53″W

Club information
- Location: Atlanta, Georgia
- Established: 1912
- Type: private
- Tota holes: 18
- Tournaments: Dogwood Invitational
- Website: www.druidhillsgolfclub.com

Druid Hills Golf Course
- Designed by: Herbert H. Barker – 1912; A. W. Tillinghast – 1935; Bob Cupp – 2003
- Par: 72
- Length: 6,860 yards
- Course rating: 73.5

The Druid Hills Golf Club is a private country club located in the Druid Hills neighborhood of Atlanta, Georgia. The course has frequently hosted U.S. Women's Open qualifying tournaments.

== History ==
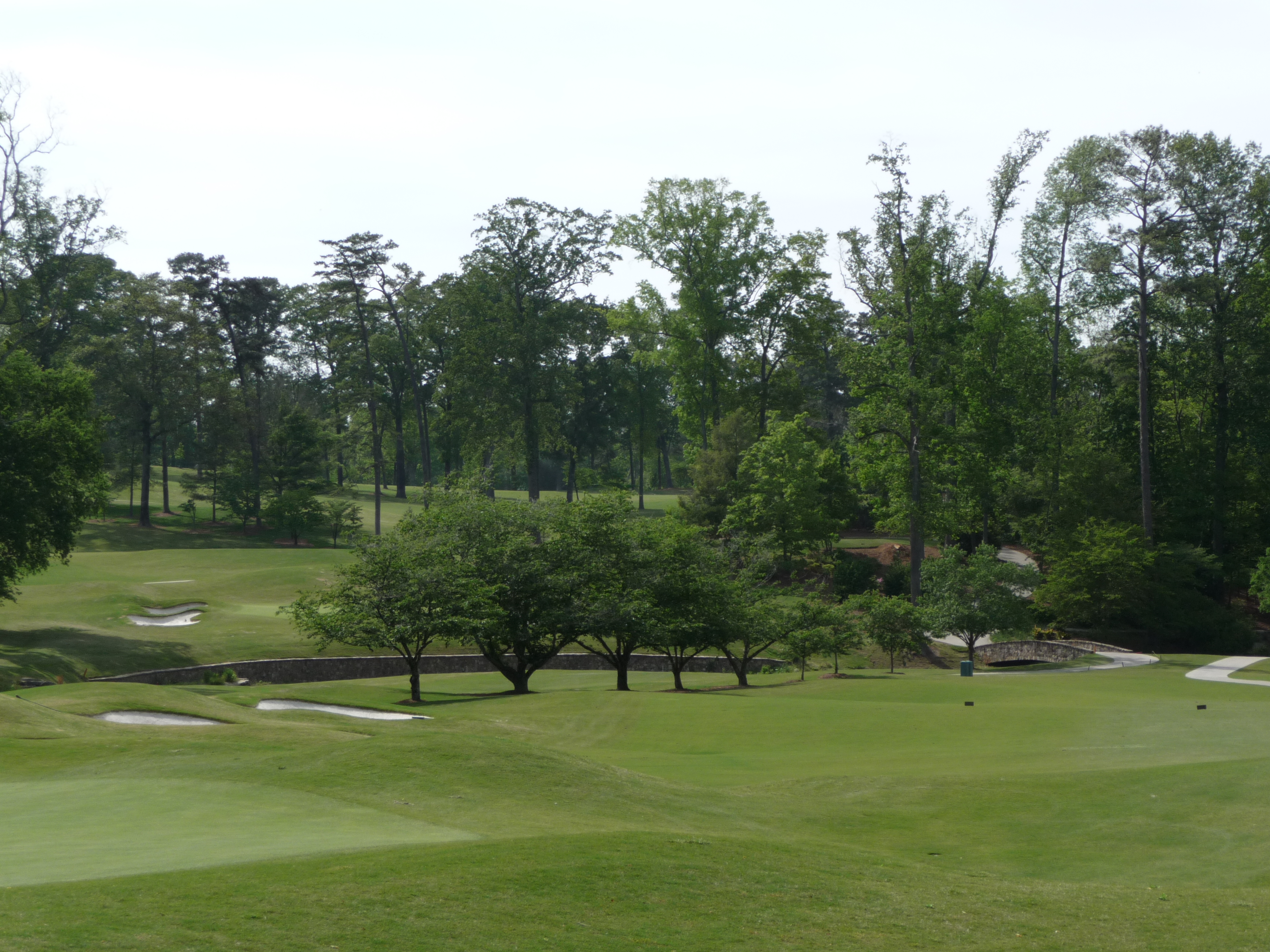
A view of the Druid Hills golf course

Founded in 1912, the club's facilities include golf, dining, tennis, fitness, and swimming.

In December 1921, Charles Mayo accepted a position as head professional at Druid Hills. He replaced the late J. Douglas Edgar. Edgar's death was mysterious. He was found late at night on West Peachtree Street in Atlanta, bleeding heavily from a deep wound in his leg, and died in the street before any trained help could arrive. The case was turned over to police, but never solved.

In May 1924, the clubhouse was gutted by fire for a $100,000 loss but was promptly rebuilt. In 2003 the golf course underwent a major rehabilitation. The club hosts the Dogwood Invitational, a top ten men's amateur golf tournament. The original course was designed by Herbert H. Barker in 1912. Subsequent renovations were completed by A. W. Tillinghast in 1935 and Bob Cupp in 2003.

== Presidential visit ==
In October 1921, President Warren G. Harding and his wife visited Atlanta. The couple had previously been in Columbus, where the president had inspected the army post at Fort Benning. The Hardings visited Druid Hills Golf Club where a luncheon was served to the president and his entourage.

== Club location ==
The Druid Hills Golf Club's street address is 740 Clifton Road, N.E., Atlanta, Georgia. The clubhouse is within Atlanta's city limits, but most of the course is located in unincorporated DeKalb County.
