= American Junior Golf Association =

American golf association for youth

The American Junior Golf Association (AJGA) is a "501(c)(3) nonprofit organization dedicated to the overall growth and development of young men and women who aspire to earn college golf scholarships through competitive junior golf." AJGA is considered by many leaders in the golf industry to be the premier junior golf association of the world. Evidence of AJGA's premier standing is shown through support from such organizations as TaylorMade Golf, adidas Golf (national sponsors), Rolex (Premier Partners), the PGA Tour and United States Golf Association (Association partners), and partnerships with more than 100 other organizations nationwide. These relationships span multiple decades and help the AJGA focus its efforts on providing an unparalleled membership experience.

The AJGA has run elite tournaments for junior golfers of both sexes in the United States since 1978. In 2023, the AJGA stages over 200 total events (including one-day qualifiers) per season. The Association is headquartered at Chateau Elan Resort in Braselton, Georgia. Currently, the AJGA focuses more on developing golfers at the highest skill levels of both sexes, preparing them for college golf, rather than fostering the recreational side of the sport, which is clearly conveyed in its mission statement.

== Playing with the AJGA ==
Junior golfers between the ages of 12 and 19 are eligible to play in American Junior Golf Association (AJGA) events, and members come from around the United States and nearly 70 world countries. Players can qualify to take part through local and regional tournaments via the AJGA's Performance Based Entry system which consistently evaluates events for quality. Players who have the ability, but not the financial means to play a national junior golf schedule may qualify for the AJGA's Liberty National ACE Grant program. This grant provides reimbursements of tournament fees and travel expenses to provide an equal playing field for all junior golfers.

== How to qualify ==
In 2003, the AJGA abandoned a tournament selection process based on the strength of a tournament application and resume in favor of the Performance Based Entry process. This enables more junior golfers ages 12–19 to earn their way into AJGA Open tournaments based on performances at top events on the national, regional and state levels.

The player's performance, not the AJGA, dictates acceptance into an event. The expanded opportunities to gain entry into AJGA events through success at the state and regional levels ensure all deserving juniors receive an opportunity to play in an AJGA event. Entry into AJGA events can be earned through numerous tournaments, major USGA events, and other state championships.

== Rankings and awards ==
The AJGA runs a variety of rankings, teams and awards. The AJGA has developed its own ranking system, the Polo Golf Rankings, that helps fill tournament fields and determine Rolex Junior All-America teams and the Rolex Junior Player of the Year recipients. Past winners of the Rolex Junior Player of the Year awards include Phil Mickelson and Tiger Woods in the Boys Division and Cristie Kerr and Paula Creamer in the Girls Division. In addition, the AJGA developed FJ Live Scoring to provide service to members and families during all rounds of AJGA events.

== Beginnings ==
The AJGA was conceived in the mid-1970s by Mike Bentley, a sportswriter in DeKalb County, Georgia. Bentley first formed the DeKalb Junior Golf Association in 1974, which eventually evolved into the Atlanta Junior Golf Association . Bentley soon realized the need for organized golf at the national level. At the time, several national junior golf tournaments existed but there was no cohesive administration of junior golf events on a national scale. Bentley envisioned such an organization, and created the American Junior Golf Association to meet the need.

The AJGA conducted its first national junior golf event in 1978, the AJGA Tournament of Champions, at Inverrary Country Club in Lauderhill, Florida. Later that same year the AJGA introduced and conducted its second national event. In addition, the AJGA also named its first Rolex Junior All-Americans in 1978, and has done so every year since.

In 1984, Stephen Hamblin was hired as the Executive Director, the same role he continues to serve today. The AJGA's first permanent home was built in 1983 at Horseshoe Bend Country Club. In September 2000, the Association moved to a new facility in Braselton, Georgia, at Chateau Elan Resort. The building was paid through capital gifts and accrued zero debt.

== Growth ==
The AJGA has experienced consistent growth throughout its history in many aspects. A staff of five in 1983 has grown to a group of more than 60 full-time employees. The number of AJGA tournaments has also increased, moving from two in 1978 to its current total of 130+ events per year. In addition, AJGA memberships have increased to nearly 9,000 annually. The AJGA also serves more than 300 college coaches who help the AJGA accomplish its mission by providing players opportunities at the next level.

== Achieving its mission ==
The AJGA focuses on running high-level, consistent golf tournaments that give college coaches the ability to accurately judge the skill level of junior golfers. This is accomplished through adherence to the USGA Rules of Golf, the AJGA Code of Conduct, a strict Pace of Play policy and the use of its Performance Based Entry system to fill tournament fields.

Each year, the vast majority of AJGA graduates go on to compete at the college level. In addition, most graduates are awarded college golf or academic scholarships.

The AJGA also has implemented a "Care for the Course" initiative in an attempt to revolutionize the way junior golfers give back to tournament courses. With this new program, the AJGA hopes to teach proper course maintenance habits that will carry on throughout a junior golfer's career. Disciplinary measure are taken to make sure respect is given to the course.

== AJGA alumni ==
Many AJGA alumni have found success at the college level and more importantly success at the professional level. AJGA college Alumni have competed successfully. AJGA college alumni have won 25 of the past 33 NCAA Division I Men's Champions (1986-2022) and 25 of the past 32 NCAA Division I Women's Champions (1986-2022). Additionally, many AJGA alumni have also found success at the professional level. With more than 200 AJGA alumni players combined on both PGA Tour and LPGA Tour, there has been a total of more than 1,000 professional victories collectively.

AJGA Alumni on the PGA Tour include: Jordan Spieth, Justin Thomas, Rickie Fowler, Patrick Cantlay, Sam Burns, Max Homa, Scottie Scheffler, Collin Morikawa, Phil Mickelson, Tiger Woods, Stewart Cink, Bob Estes, Keegan Bradley, Bill Haas, Steve Marino, Jim Furyk, Sergio Garcia, Lucas Glover, J.B. Holmes, Charles Howell III, Matt Kuchar, Dustin Johnson, Justin Leonard, Davis Love III, Hunter Mahan, Joe Ogilvie, Sean O'Hair, David Toms, Bubba Watson, and Scott Verplank.

AJGA Alumnae on the LPGA Tour include: Paula Creamer, Rose Zhang, Alison Lee, Lexi Thompson, Nelly Korda, Jessica Korda, Stacy Lewis, Morgan Pressel, Brittany Lang, Brittany Lincicome, Jessica Korda, Amanda Blumenherst, Vicki Goetze-Ackerman, Julieta Granada, Pat Hurst, Cristie Kerr, I.K. Kim, In-Bee Park, Michelle McGann, Kristy McPherson, Lorena Ochoa, Kelly Robbins and Wendy Ward.
