= PGA West =

Resort golf course in La Quinta, CA, US

Coordinates: 33.643302°N 116.267506°W

- Interactive map of PGA West

Club information
- Location: La Quinta, California, United States
- Established: 1986
- Type: Private (3 courses) Resort (3 courses)
- Owner: Century Golf Partners
- Operator: Arnold Palmer Golf Management
- Total holes: 108
- Tournaments: The American Express, formerly the Desert Classic (1987, 2016-); Liberty Mutual Legends of Golf (1995–96)
- Website: www.pgawest.com/golf

Stadium Course
- Designed by: Pete Dye
- Par: 72
- Length: 7,113 yards

Norman
- Designed by: Greg Norman
- Par: 72
- Length: 7,200 yards

Nicklaus Tournament
- Designed by: Jack Nicklaus
- Par: 72
- Length: 7,204 yards

Nicklaus Private
- Designed by: Jack Nicklaus
- Par: 72
- Length: 6,951 yards

Palmer
- Designed by: Arnold Palmer
- Par: 72
- Length: 6,950 yards

Weiskopf
- Designed by: Tom Weiskopf
- Par: 72
- Length: 7,164 yards

PGA West is a set of 6 golf courses located in La Quinta, California.

The PGA West Stadium Course was designed by Pete Dye and is viewed as the sequel to the TPC at Sawgrass. It was inspired by the Scottish links-style courses and at one point was considered one of Golf Digest's Top 100 Courses in America.

== Golf tournaments ==
The PGA West Stadium Course has hosted many important golf tournaments and is considered one of the most challenging courses in America.

- Skins Game – 1986–1991
- The American Express, formerly the Desert Classic – 1987, 2016–present
- PGA Club Professional Championship – 1990
- PGA Tour Qualifying School Finals – 1986, 1988, 1989, 2002, 2006 and 2008
- Liberty Mutual Legends of Golf – 1995–1996

== Controversy ==
The PGA West Stadium Course has long been known as the course that was too tough for the professionals. In 1987 it made its first appearance as a PGA Tour venue in the Bob Hope Classic (now known as The American Express). After creating a challenging course setup in what is normally one of the PGA Tour's easier tournaments, the tour pros refused to return in 1988 successfully signing a petition to get it removed as one of the host courses, a ban that effectively ran until 2015; the course returned to the rotation in 2016.
