= 2009 WGC-Bridgestone Invitational =

Coordinates: 41.008°N 81.508°W

Tournament information
- Dates: August 6–9, 2009
- Location: Akron, Ohio, U.S.
- Course(s): Firestone Country Club
- Tour(s): PGA Tour; European Tour

Statistics
- Par: 70
- Length: 7,400 yards (6,767 m)
- Field: 80 players
- Cut: None
- Prize fund: $8.5 million
- Winner's share: $1.4 million

Champion
- (United States) Tiger Woods
- 268 (−12)

Location in the United States
Location in Ohio

The 2009 WGC-Bridgestone Invitational was a professional golf tournament held August 6–9 over the South Course at Firestone Country Club in Akron, Ohio. It was the eleventh WGC-Bridgestone Invitational tournament, and the third of four World Golf Championships events held in 2009.

World number 1 Tiger Woods won his 16th World Golf Championships title, which was his seventh Invitational title. This was his fourth Invitational title in as many starts, as he won three consecutive (2005, 2006, 2007) and missed the 2008 edition due to recuperation after leg surgery. He shot 268 (−12), four strokes ahead of runners-up Robert Allenby and Pádraig Harrington. This was Woods' 10th Invitational appearance and had yet to finish out of the top five; he was second in 2004 and fourth twice (2002, 2003).

== Field ==
1. Playing members of the 2008 United States and European Ryder Cup teams
Chad Campbell, Paul Casey (3,4,5), Stewart Cink (2,3,4,5), Ben Curtis (3,4), Jim Furyk (2,3,4), Sergio García (3,4,5), Søren Hansen (3,4), Pádraig Harrington (3,4,5), J. B. Holmes, Miguel Ángel Jiménez (3,4), Anthony Kim (3,4), Justin Leonard (3,4), Hunter Mahan (2,3,4), Graeme McDowell (3,4), Phil Mickelson (2,3,4,5), Kenny Perry (3,4,5), Ian Poulter (3,4), Justin Rose, Henrik Stenson (3,4,5), Steve Stricker (2,3,4,5), Boo Weekley, Lee Westwood (3,4), Oliver Wilson (3,4)

- Robert Karlsson (3,4,5) did not play.

2. Playing members of the 2007 United States and International Presidents Cup teams
Stuart Appleby, Woody Austin, Ángel Cabrera (3,4,5), K. J. Choi, Ernie Els (3,4), Lucas Glover (3,4,5), Retief Goosen (3,4,5), Charles Howell III, Trevor Immelman, Zach Johnson (3,4,5), Geoff Ogilvy (3,4,5), Nick O'Hern, Rory Sabbatini (3,4,5), Adam Scott (3,4), Vijay Singh (3,4,5), David Toms (3,4), Scott Verplank, Mike Weir (3,4), Tiger Woods (3,4,5)

3. Top 50 players from the Official World Golf Rankings two weeks prior to event
Robert Allenby (4), Tim Clark (4,5), Luke Donald (4), Gonzalo Fernández-Castaño (4,5), Ross Fisher (4), Brian Gay (4,5), Mathew Goggin (4), Dustin Johnson (5), Shingo Katayama (4), Martin Kaymer (4,5), Søren Kjeldsen (4,5), Davis Love III (4,5), Rory McIlroy (4,5), Sean O'Hair (4,5), Álvaro Quirós (4,5), Jeev Milkha Singh (4,5), Camilo Villegas (4,5), Nick Watney (4,5)

4. Top 50 players from the Official World Golf Rankings one week prior to event
Thongchai Jaidee (5)

5. Winners of Federation tournaments since the prior year's tournament with an Official World Golf Ranking Strength of Field Rating of 115 points or more
Cameron Beckman, Christian Cévaër, Darren Clarke, Nick Dougherty, Nathan Green, Grégory Havret, Anthony Kang, Jerry Kelly, Danny Lee, Shane Lowry, Prayad Marksaeng, Pat Perez, Carl Pettersson, Richard Sterne, Marc Turnesa, Yang Yong-eun

- Lin Wen-tang did not play.

6. The winner of selected tournaments from each of the following tours:

- Japan Golf Tour: Japan Golf Tour Championship (2009) – Yuji Igarashi
- PGA Tour of Australasia: Australian PGA Championship (2008) – Geoff Ogilvy, already qualified through categories 2, 3, 4, and 5
- Sunshine Tour: Vodacom Championship (2009) – Anders Hansen
- Asian Tour: Volvo Masters of Asia (2008) – Lam Chih Bing

== Round summaries ==
=== First round ===
Thursday, August 6, 2009

Place	Player	Score	To par
1	(Republic of Ireland) Pádraig Harrington	64	−6
T2	(South Africa) Tim Clark	66	−4
T2	(Thailand) Prayad Marksaeng	66	−4
T2	(United States) Scott Verplank	66	−4
T5	(United States) Zach Johnson	67	−3
T5	(England) Ian Poulter	67	−3
T5	(United States) Steve Stricker	67	−3
T8	(Australia) Robert Allenby	68	−2
T8	(Spain) Miguel Ángel Jiménez	68	−2
T8	(Spain) Sergio García	68	−2
T8	(New Zealand) Danny Lee	68	−2
T8	(United States) Hunter Mahan	68	−2
T8	(United States) Tiger Woods	68	−2

=== Second round ===
Friday, August 7, 2009

Place	Player	Score	To par
1	(Republic of Ireland) Pádraig Harrington	64-69=133	−7
2	(South Africa) Tim Clark	66-68=134	−6
3	(United States) Scott Verplank	66-69=135	−5
T4	(United States) Jerry Kelly	71-65=136	−4
T4	(Thailand) Prayad Marksaeng	66-70=136	−4
T4	(United States) Steve Stricker	67-69=136	−4
T7	(Australia) Robert Allenby	68-69=137	−3
T7	(United States) Woody Austin	69-68=137	−3
T7	(United States) Zach Johnson	67-70=137	−3
T7	(United States) Hunter Mahan	68-69=137	−3
T7	(Spain) Álvaro Quirós	72-65=137	−3
T7	(Canada) Mike Weir	71-66=137	−3

=== Third round ===
Saturday, August 8, 2009

Place	Player	Score	To par
1	(Republic of Ireland) Pádraig Harrington	64-69-67=200	−10
2	(United States) Tiger Woods	68-70-65=203	−7
3	(United States) Jerry Kelly	71-65-69=205	−5
T4	(Australia) Robert Allenby	68-69-69=206	−4
T4	(United States) Woody Austin	69-68-69=206	−4
T4	(Argentina) Ángel Cabrera	70-68-68=206	−4
T4	(United States) Stewart Cink	69-69-68=206	−4
T4	(United States) Lucas Glover	69-69-68=206	−4
T4	(Spain) Miguel Ángel Jiménez	68-72-66=206	−4
T4	(United States) Zach Johnson	67-70-69=206	−4
T4	(United States) Kenny Perry	69-71-66=206	−4
T4	(Canada) Mike Weir	71-66-69=206	−4
T4	(England) Oliver Wilson	69-69-68=206	−4

=== Final round ===
Sunday, August 9, 2009

Place	Player	Score	To par	Money ($)
1	(United States) Tiger Woods	68-70-65-65=268	−12	1,400,000
T2	(Australia) Robert Allenby	68-69-69-66=272	−8	665,000
T2	(Republic of Ireland) Pádraig Harrington	64-69-67-72=272	−8	665,000
T4	(Argentina) Ángel Cabrera	70-68-68-67=273	−7	332,000
T4	(United States) Hunter Mahan	68-69-70-66=273	−7	332,000
T6	(United States) Stewart Cink	69-69-68-68=274	−6	214,333
T6	(Spain) Miguel Ángel Jiménez	68-72-66-68=274	−6	214,333
T6	(United States) Steve Stricker	67-69-71-67=274	−6	214,333
9	(England) Lee Westwood	69-71-70-65=275	−5	160,000
10	(Canada) Mike Weir	71-66-69-70=276	−4	145,000

==== Scorecard ====
Final round

Hole	1	2	3	4	5	6	7	8	9	10	11	12	13	14	15	16	17	18
Par	4	5	4	4	3	4	3	4	4	4	4	3	4	4	3	5	4	4
(United States) Woods	−7	−9	−9	−10	−11	−11	−11	−11	−12	−12	−12	−12	−11	−10	−10	−11	−11	−12
(Australia) Allenby	−4	−5	−5	−5	−5	−5	−5	−6	−7	−7	−7	−7	−7	−7	−8	−8	−7	−8
(Republic of Ireland) Harrington	−10	−10	−10	−10	−10	−10	−10	−10	−10	−10	−11	−11	−11	−11	−11	−8	−8	−8
(Argentina) Cabrera	−4	−5	−5	−5	−5	−4	−5	−5	−5	−6	−6	−6	−6	−6	−7	−7	−7	−7
(United States) Mahan	−3	−5	−4	−4	−4	−4	−5	−5	−5	−5	−4	−5	−5	−6	−6	−7	−7	−7

Cumulative tournament scores, relative to par

Eagle	Birdie	Bogey	Triple bogey+
