= TGR Foundation =

Charity

- Abbreviation: TGRF
- Formation: November 18, 1996; 29 years ago
- Legal status: Non-Profit
- Location: Irvine, California
- Founders: Tiger Woods, Earl Woods
- CEO: Gordon McNeill
- Main organ: Board of Directors
- Affiliations: TGR Learning Lab; TGR EDU:Explore; Earl Woods Scholarship Program; TGR EDU:Create
- Website: TGR Foundation

TGR Foundation was established in 1996 by Tiger Woods and his father, Earl Woods, to create and support community-based programs that improve the health, education, and welfare of all children in America. The charity began as a junior golf clinic where Woods introduced the basics of the game to inner-city kids. The Foundation shifted focus in 2001 to support STEM education for kids from underprivileged communities.

Currently, the foundation has established several programs and events such as the TGR Learning Labs, Hero World Challenge, Genesis Open, The National, and Tiger Jam which all benefit and impact the lives of millions of children. The organization's primary source of funding comes from several golf events hosted by Woods, including three PGA tour events, the Pebble Beach Invitational, and the three-day Tiger Jam entertainment and golf event in Las Vegas.

The Tiger Woods Foundation does this through three primary initiatives, the first is educational and other enrichment programs at the learning center in Anaheim, such as after-school STEM programming for high school students. The second key initiative is that the foundation provides 25 students each year with a full college scholarship, focusing on students from challenging backgrounds, or those lacking financial support. The last initiative the foundation supports is called Pathways Forward. Pathways Forward is an event organized in response to the COVID-19 pandemic. It aims to raise funds to support students and educators who were facing challenges due to the pandemics' impact on education. It also aims to give students business skills to help them in their future careers.

TGRF also established the Tiger Woods Learning Center, a 23-acre education and golf facility for kids in Southern California. While there, they can take classes in everything from science and math to languages and fine arts. Plus there will be a summer camp where kids from all over the country can enjoy the facilities.

I wanted a permanent, safe space for kids to explore their dreams

— Tiger Woods
