= Tiger Woods =

American professional golfer (born 1975)

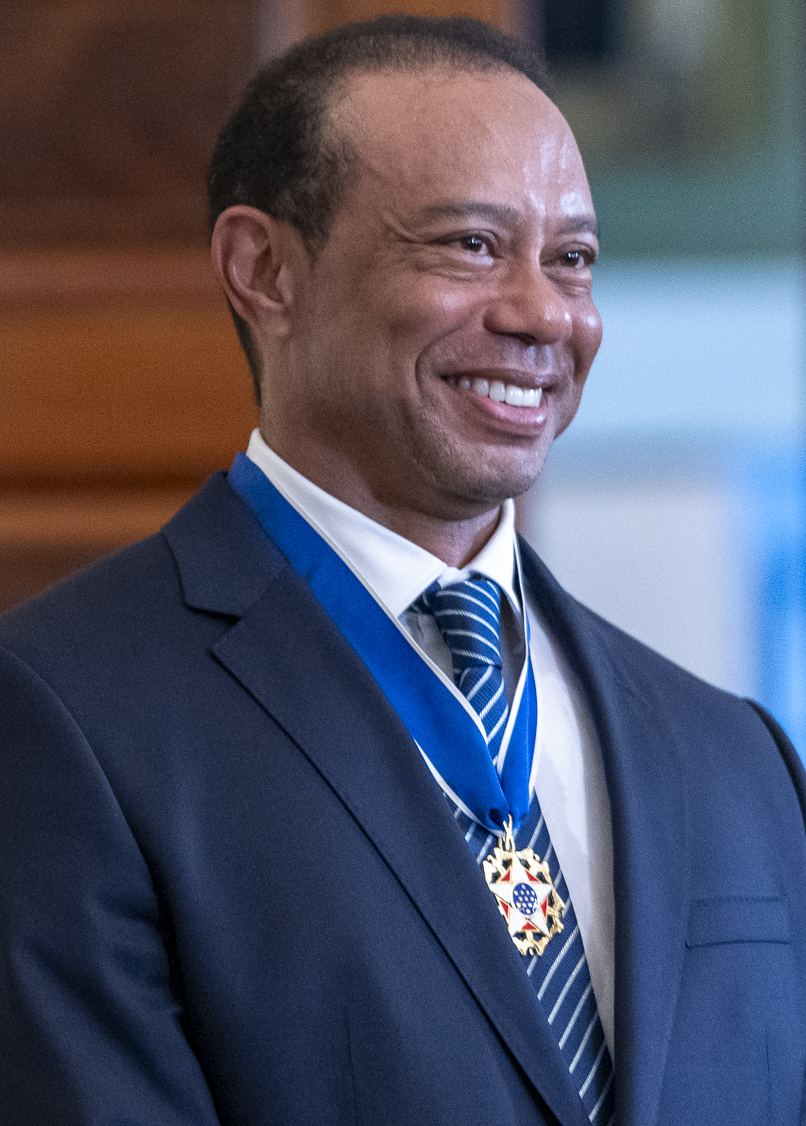
- Woods at the White House in 2025

Personal information
- Full name: Eldrick Tont Woods
- Nickname: Tiger
- Nationality: United States
- Born: December 30, 1975 (age 50) Cypress, California, U.S.
- Height: 6 ft 1 in (185 cm)
- Weight: 185 lb (84 kg)
- Spouse: Elin Nordegren (m. 2004; div. 2010)
- Children: 2, including Charlie

Career
- Sport: Golf
- Partners: Lindsey Vonn (2013–2015); Vanessa Trump (2024–present)
- College: Stanford University
- Turned professional: 1996
- Current tour: PGA Tour (joined 1996)
- Professional wins: 110 (Note: This is calculated by totalling Woods's 82 PGA Tour victories, 8 regular European Tour wins, 2 non co-sanctioned Japan Golf Tour wins, 1 non co-sanctioned Asian PGA Tour win, and the 17 other wins in his career.)
- Highest ranking: 1 (June 15, 1997) (683 weeks)

Number of wins by tour
- PGA Tour: 82 (Tied-1st all-time)
- European Tour: 41 (3rd all-time) (Note: These are the 15 majors, 18 WGC events, and his eight tour wins.)
- Japan Golf Tour: 3
- Asian Tour: 2
- PGA Tour of Australasia: 3
- Other: 17

Best results in major championships (wins: 15)
- Masters Tournament: Won: 1997, 2001, 2002, 2005, 2019
- PGA Championship: Won: 1999, 2000, 2006, 2007
- U.S. Open: Won: 2000, 2002, 2008
- The Open Championship: Won: 2000, 2005, 2006

Achievements and awards
- World Golf Hall of Fame: 2021 (member page)
- Haskins Award: 1996
- PGA Tour Rookie of the Year: 1996
- PGA Tour money list winner: 1997, 1999, 2000, 2001, 2002, 2005, 2006, 2007, 2009, 2013
- PGA Tour Player of the Year: 1997, 1999, 2000, 2001, 2002, 2003, 2005, 2006, 2007, 2009, 2013
- PGA Player of the Year: 1997, 1999, 2000, 2001, 2002, 2003, 2005, 2006, 2007, 2009, 2013
- Byron Nelson Award: 1999, 2000, 2001, 2002, 2003, 2005, 2006, 2007, 2009
- Vardon Trophy: 1999, 2000, 2001, 2002, 2003, 2005, 2007, 2009, 2013
- Laureus World Sports Award Sportsman of the Year: 2000, 2001
- PGA Tour FedEx Cup winner: 2007, 2009
- Presidential Medal of Freedom: 2019
- (For a full list of awards, see here)

Eldrick Tont "Tiger" Woods (born December 30, 1975) is an American professional golfer. He is widely regarded as one of the greatest golfers of all time and as one of the most famous athletes in modern history. Woods is tied for first in PGA Tour wins, ranks second in men's major championships, holds numerous golf records, and is an inductee of the World Golf Hall of Fame.

Following an outstanding junior, college, and amateur career, Woods turned professional in 1996 at age 20. In April 1997 he won his first major, the 1997 Masters, which he won by 12 strokes in a record-setting performance. He reached number one in the Official World Golf Ranking for the first time in June 1997, less than a year after turning professional. At the 2000 U.S. Open Woods won by a major record 15 strokes which is regarded by many as the greatest performance in golf history. After winning the 2001 Masters he became the only player to win four consecutive major championships in a one-year period in a feat known as the "Tiger Slam". Woods dominated men's golf throughout the first decade of the 21st century, holding the world's top ranking from August 1999 to September 2004 (264 consecutive weeks) and again from June 2005 to October 2010 (281 consecutive weeks). The following decade was marked by comebacks from personal issues and injuries. He took a self‑imposed hiatus from professional golf from December 2009 to April 2010 to address marital problems. Woods fell to number 58 in the world rankings in November 2011 before returning to the number‑one position between March 2013 and May 2014. Injuries led to four back surgeries between 2014 and 2017, and he competed in only one tournament between August 2015 and January 2018, dropping out of the world's top 1,000 players. After returning to regular competition, he won the Tour Championship in September 2018—his first victory in five years—and the 2019 Masters, his first major in 11 years.

Woods holds numerous golf records. He has spent the most consecutive weeks and the most total weeks as the world's number‑one player. He has been named PGA Player of the Year a record 11 times, and he led the PGA Tour money list in 10 seasons. He has won 15 major golf championships (second only to Jack Nicklaus's 18) and 82 PGA Tour events (tied with Sam Snead for the all-time record). Woods is one of six men to complete the career Grand Slam, along with Gene Sarazen, Ben Hogan, Gary Player, Nicklaus, and Rory McIlroy. He is the youngest to do so, and one of two golfers—along with Nicklaus—to achieve the career Grand Slam three times. He was a member of the winning United States team at the 1999 Ryder Cup and received the Presidential Medal of Freedom in May 2019.

Woods was awarded AP Athlete of the Year four times and AP Athlete of the Decade of the 2000s. He was also awarded Sports Illustrated Sportsperson of the Year three times and the Laureus World Sports Sportsman of the Year twice. Woods was among Time's 100 most influential people in the world in 2004, 2009 and 2019, which is tied for the second most selections for a professional athlete. He has been listed by Forbes as the highest paid athlete in the world for a record 11 years, including for 10 straight years from 2002 to 2011. As of April 2026, his net worth was estimated at US$1.5 billion by Forbes.

On February 23, 2021, Woods was hospitalized after a single‑car collision and underwent emergency surgery for compound fractures in his right leg and a shattered ankle. In a November 2021 interview with Golf Digest, he stated that his full‑time professional career was over, though he intended to play a limited schedule. He returned to the PGA Tour at the 2022 Masters. In 2026, Woods was involved in another car crash and reached a plea deal for willful reckless driving.

== Background and family ==
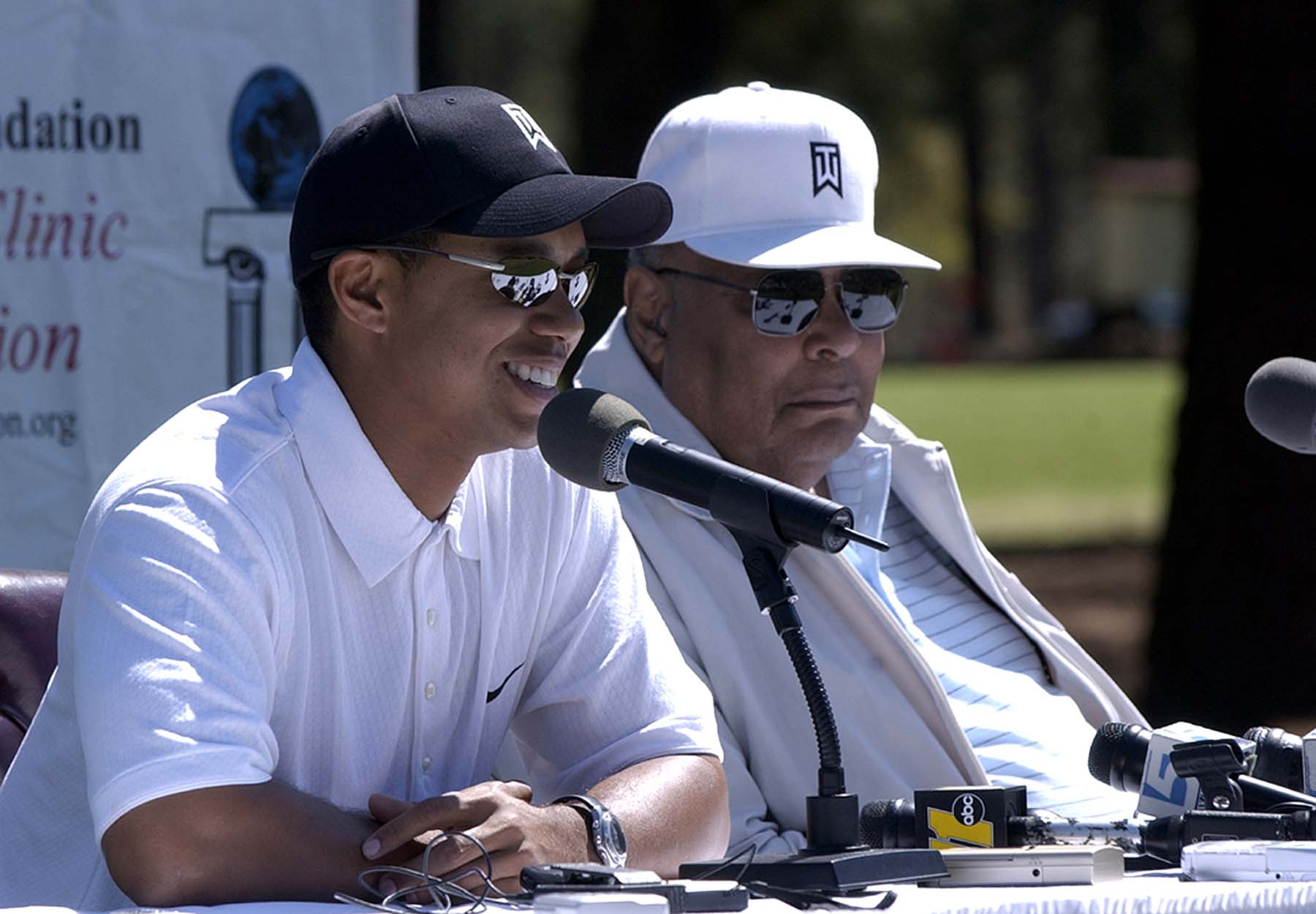
Woods and his father Earl at Fort Bragg, North Carolina, in 2004

Woods was born on December 30, 1975, in Cypress, California, a suburb of Los Angeles. He is the only child of Earl and Kultida "Tida" Woods (née Punsawad). He has two half‑brothers and a half‑sister from his father's first marriage. Earl, a retired U.S. Army officer and Vietnam War veteran, was born to African-American parents and was also described as having European, Chinese, and Native American (Cherokee) ancestry. Kultida was originally from Thailand, where she met Earl during his tour of duty in 1968. She was of mixed Thai, Chinese, and Dutch descent. In 2002, ESPN stated that Woods was "one-quarter Thai, one-quarter Chinese, one-quarter Caucasian, one-eighth African American and one-eighth Native American." Woods has described his ethnic background as "Cablinasian", a term he coined from Caucasian, Black, American Indian, and Asian.

His mother chose his first name, Eldrick, because it began with "E" (for Earl) and ended with "K" (for Kultida). His middle name, Tont, is a traditional Thai name. He was nicknamed Tiger in honor of his father's friend, South Vietnamese colonel Vuong Dang Phong, who was also known as "Tiger". Woods's niece, Cheyenne Woods, played collegiate golf at Wake Forest University and turned professional in 2012, making her debut at the LPGA Championship.

Earl died on May 3, 2006. Kultida died on February 4, 2025. Following his mother's death, Woods stated that "without her none of my personal achievements would have been possible."

== Early life and amateur golf career ==
A child prodigy, Woods was introduced to golf before the age of two by his father, an accomplished athlete who was a single‑digit‑handicap amateur golfer and one of the earliest African American college baseball players at Kansas State University. Woods later said he had once hoped to become a baseball player like his father but abandoned that goal after tearing his rotator cuff. Because his father was a member of the military, he had playing privileges at the Navy Golf Course adjacent to the Joint Forces Training Base in Los Alamitos, which allowed Woods to play there. Woods also played at the par-3 Heartwell Golf Course in Long Beach and at several Long beach municipal courses.

In 1978, Woods putted against comedian Bob Hope during a television appearance on The Mike Douglas Show. At age three, he shot a 48 over nine holes at the Navy course. At age five, he appeared in Golf Digest and on ABC's That's Incredible!. Before turning seven, Woods won the Under‑Age‑10 division of the Drive, Pitch, and Putt competition at the Navy Golf Course in Cypress. In 1984, at age eight, he won the 9–10 boys' event—the youngest available age group—at the Junior World Golf Championships. He first broke 80 at age eight. Woods went on to win the Junior World Championships six times, including four consecutive titles from 1988 to 1991. His father later wrote that Woods first defeated him at age 11, with Earl playing his best; Earl never beat Woods again. Woods first broke 70 on a regulation course at age 12.

At age 13, Woods played in the 1989 Big I, his first major national junior tournament. In the final round, he was paired with professional golfer John Daly, then relatively unknown. The event's format placed one professional with each group of juniors. Daly birdied three of the last four holes to defeat Woods by a single stroke. As a young teenager, Woods met Jack Nicklaus at the Bel-Air Country Club in Los Angeles, where Nicklaus was conducting a clinic. Woods participated in the exhibition and impressed Nicklaus and the audience with his skill and potential. His father had extensively studied Nicklaus's records and set those achievements as goals for his son.

At age 15, while attending Western High School in Anaheim, Woods became the youngest U.S. Junior Amateur champion, a record that stood until Jim Liu broke it in 2010. Woods was named the 1991 Southern California Amateur Player of the Year (for the second consecutive year) and the Golf Digest Junior Amateur Player of the Year. In 1992, Woods successfully defended his U.S. Junior Amateur title, becoming the event's first two‑time winner. That year he also competed in his first PGA Tour event, the Nissan Los Angeles Open (he missed the 36-hole cut), and was named Golf Digest Amateur Player of the Year, Golf World Player of the Year, and Golfweek National Amateur of the Year.

Woods won his third consecutive U.S. Junior Amateur the following year, remaining the event's only three‑time champion. In 1994, at TPC Sawgrass in Florida, he became the youngest winner of the U.S. Amateur, a record that stood until 2008 when it was broken by Danny Lee. He represented the U.S. at the 1994 Eisenhower Trophy World Amateur Golf Team Championships (winning) and the 1995 Walker Cup (losing).

Woods graduated from Western High School in 1994 at age 18 and was voted "Most Likely to Succeed" by his classmates. He starred on the school's golf team under coach Don Crosby. As a child, Woods learned to manage a stutter. This became publicly known when he wrote a letter to a boy who had contemplated suicide, telling him: "I know what it's like to be different and to sometimes not fit in. I also stuttered as a child and I would talk to my dog and he would sit there and listen until he fell asleep. I also took a class for two years to help me, and I finally learned to stop."

== College golf career ==
Woods was heavily recruited by college golf powers and chose Stanford University, the reigning NCAA champions. He enrolled at Stanford in the fall of 1994 under a golf scholarship and won his first collegiate event, the 40th Annual William H. Tucker Invitational, that September. He selected a major in economics and was nicknamed "Urkel" by college teammate Notah Begay III. In 1995, he successfully defended his U.S. Amateur title at the Newport Country Club in Rhode Island and was voted Pac-10 Player of the Year, NCAA First Team All-American, and Stanford's Male Freshman of the Year (an award that encompasses all sports).

At age 19, Woods participated in his first PGA Tour major, the 1995 Masters, and tied for 41st as the only amateur to make the cut. At age 20 in 1996, he became the first golfer to win three consecutive U.S. Amateur titles and won the NCAA individual golf championship. In winning the silver medal as leading amateur at The Open Championship, he tied the record for an amateur aggregate score of 281. He left college after two years in order to turn professional in the golf industry. In 1996, Woods moved out of California, stating in 2013 that it was due to the state's high tax rate.

== Professional career ==
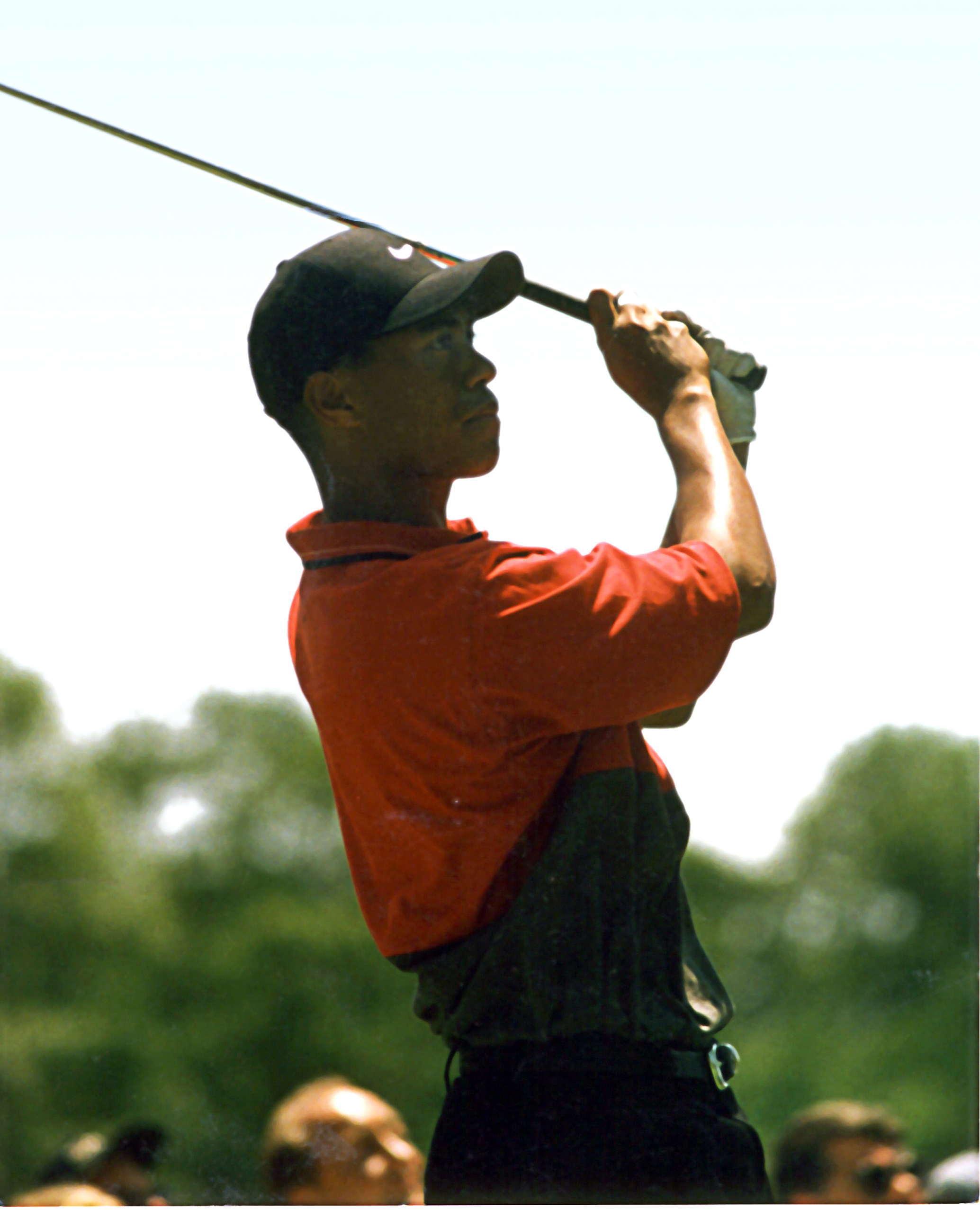
Woods in 1997

Woods turned professional at age 20 in August 1996 and immediately signed advertising deals with Nike, Inc. and Titleist that ranked as the most lucrative endorsement contracts in golf history at that time. Woods was named Sports Illustrated's 1996 Sportsman of the Year and PGA Tour Rookie of the Year. On April 13, 1997, he won his first major, the Masters, in record-breaking fashion and became the tournament's youngest winner at age 21. Two months later, he set the record for the fastest ascent to No. 1 in the Official World Golf Ranking. After a lackluster 1998, Woods finished the 1999 season with eight wins, including the PGA Championship, a feat not achieved since Johnny Miller did it in 1974.

Woods was severely myopic; his eyesight had a rating of 11 diopters. In order to correct this problem, he underwent successful laser eye surgery in 1999, and he immediately resumed winning tour events. In 2007, his vision again began to deteriorate, and he underwent laser eye surgery a second time. In 2000, Woods won six consecutive events on the PGA Tour, the longest winning streak since Ben Hogan accomplished the feat in 1948. One of these victories was the U.S. Open, where he broke or tied nine tournament records in what Sports Illustrated called "the greatest performance in golf history," winning by a record 15-stroke margin and earning $800,000. With the victory, Woods became the only golfer in history to have won the U.S. Junior Amateur, U.S. Amateur, and U.S. Open. At age 24, he became the youngest golfer to achieve the Career Grand Slam. At the end of 2000, Woods had won nine of the twenty PGA Tour events he entered and had broken the record for lowest scoring average in tour history. He was named the Sports Illustrated Sportsman of the Year, the only athlete to be honored twice, and was ranked by Golf Digest magazine as the twelfth-best golfer of all time.

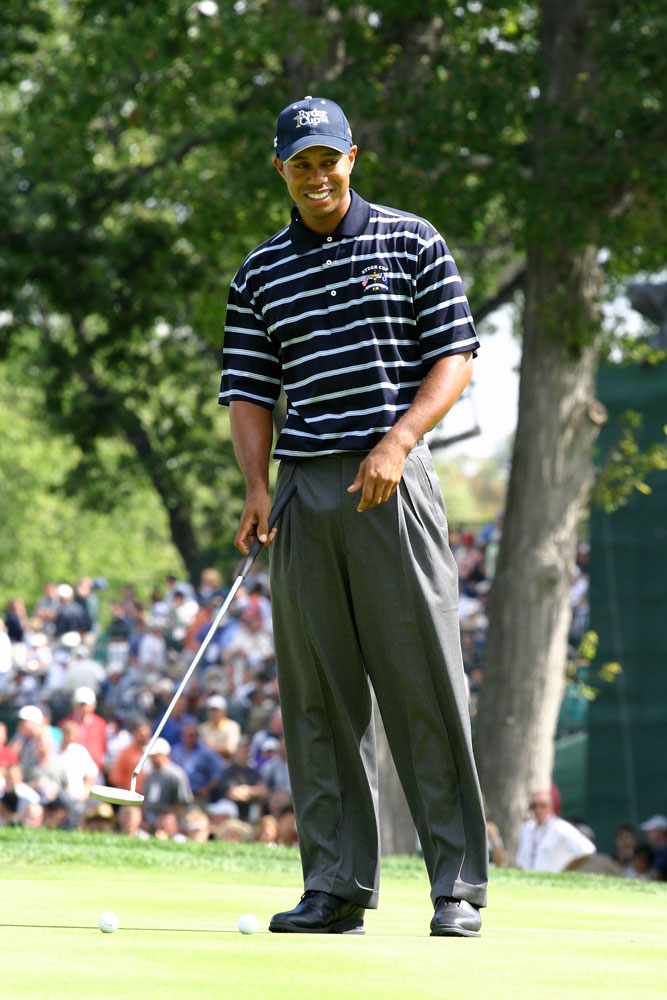
Woods at the 2004 Ryder Cup

When Woods won the 2001 Masters, he became the only player to win four consecutive major professional golf titles, although not in the same calendar year. This achievement came to be known as the "Tiger Slam". Following a stellar 2001 and 2002 in which he continued to dominate the tour, Woods's career hit a slump. He did not win a major in 2003 or 2004. In September 2004, Vijay Singh overtook Woods in the Official World Golf Rankings, ending Woods's record streak of 264 weeks at No. 1.

Woods rebounded in 2005, winning six PGA Tour events and reclaiming the top spot in July after swapping it back and forth with Singh over the first half of the year.

Woods began dominantly in 2006, winning his first two PGA tournaments but failing to capture his fifth Masters championship in April. Following the death of his father in May, Woods took some time off from the tour and appeared rusty upon his return at the U.S. Open at Winged Foot Golf Club, where he missed the cut. However, he quickly returned to form and ended the year by winning six consecutive tour events. At the season's close, Woods had 54 total wins that included 12 majors; he broke the tour records for both total wins and total majors wins over eleven seasons.

Woods continued to excel in 2007 and the first part of 2008. In April 2008, he underwent knee surgery and missed the next two months on the tour. Woods returned for the 2008 U.S. Open, where he struggled the first day but ultimately claimed a dramatic sudden death victory over Rocco Mediate that followed an 18-hole playoff, after which Mediate said, "This guy does things that are just not normal by any stretch of the imagination," and Kenny Perry added, "He beat everybody on one leg." Two days later, Woods announced that he would miss the remainder of the season due to additional knee surgery, and that his knee was more severely damaged than previously revealed, prompting even greater praise for his U.S. Open performance. Woods called it "my greatest ever championship." In Woods's absence, television ratings for the remainder of the season suffered a huge decline from 2007.

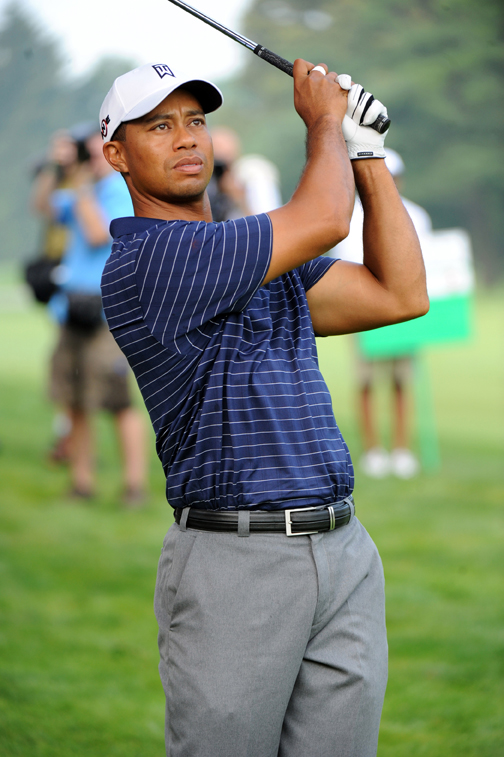
Woods competing at the third annual Earl Woods Memorial Pro-Am (July 1, 2009)

Woods had a much anticipated return to golf in 2009, when he performed well. His comeback included a spectacular performance at the 2009 Presidents Cup, but he failed to win a major, the first year since 2004 that he did not do so. After his marital infidelities came to light and received massive media coverage at the end of 2009 (see further details below), Woods announced in December that he would be taking an indefinite break from competitive golf. In February 2010, he delivered a televised apology for his behavior, saying "I was wrong and I was foolish." During this period, several companies ended their endorsement deals with Woods.

Woods returned to competition in April at the 2010 Masters, where he finished tied for fourth place. He followed the Masters with poor showings at the Quail Hollow Championship and the Players Championship, where he withdrew in the fourth round, citing injury. Shortly afterward, Hank Haney, Woods's coach since 2003, resigned the position. In August, Woods hired Sean Foley as Haney's replacement. The rest of the season went badly for Woods, who failed to win a single event for the first time since turning professional, while nevertheless finishing the season ranked No. 2 in the world.

In 2011, Woods's performance continued to suffer; this took its toll on his ranking. After falling to No. 7 in March, he rebounded to No. 5 with a strong showing at the 2011 Masters, where he tied for fourth place. Due to leg injuries incurred at the Masters, he missed several summer stops on the PGA Tour. In July, he fired his longtime caddie Steve Williams (who was shocked by the dismissal), and replaced him on an interim basis with friend Bryon Bell until he hired Joe LaCava. After returning to tournament play in August, Woods continued to falter, and his ranking gradually fell to a low of #58. He rose to No. 50 in mid-November after a third-place finish at the Emirates Australian Open, and broke his winless streak with a victory at December's Chevron World Challenge.

Woods began his 2012 season with two tournaments (the Abu Dhabi HSBC Golf Championship and the AT&T Pebble Beach National Pro-Am) where he started off well but struggled on the final rounds. Following the WGC-Accenture Match Play Championship, where he was knocked out in the second round by missing a 5-foot putt, Woods revised his putting technique and tied for second at The Honda Classic, with the lowest final-round score in his PGA Tour career. After a short time off due to another leg injury, Woods won the Arnold Palmer Invitational, his first win on the PGA Tour since the BMW Championship in September 2009. Following several dismal performances, Woods notched his 73rd PGA Tour win at the Memorial Tournament in June, tying Jack Nicklaus in second place for most PGA Tour victories; a month later, Woods surpassed Nicklaus with a win at the AT&T National, to trail only Sam Snead, who accumulated 82 PGA tour wins.

The year 2013 brought a return of Woods's dominating play. In January, he won the Farmers Insurance Open by four shots for his 75th PGA Tour win. It was the seventh time he won the event. In March, he won the WGC-Cadillac Championship, also for the seventh time, giving him his 17th WGC title and first since 2009. Two weeks later, he won the Arnold Palmer Invitational, winning the event for a record-tying 8th time. The win moved him back to the top of the world rankings. To commemorate that achievement, Nike was quick to launch an ad with the tagline "winning takes care of everything".

During the 2013 Masters, Woods faced disqualification after unwittingly admitting in a post-round interview with ESPN that he took an illegal drop on the par-5 15th hole when his third shot bounced off the pin and into the water. After further review of television footage, Woods was assessed a two-stroke penalty for the drop but was not disqualified. He finished tied for fourth in the event. Woods won The Players Championship in May 2013, his second career win at the event, notching his fourth win of the 2013 season. It was the quickest he got to four wins in any season of his professional career.

Woods had a poor showing at the 2013 U.S. Open as a result of an elbow injury that he sustained at The Players Championship. In finishing at 13-over-par, he recorded his worst score as a professional and finished 12 strokes behind winner Justin Rose. After a prolonged break because of the injury, during which he missed the Greenbrier Classic and his own AT&T National, he returned at the Open Championship at Muirfield. Despite being in contention all week and beginning the final round only two strokes behind Lee Westwood, he struggled with the speed of the greens and could only manage a 3-over-par 74 that left him tied for 6th place, five strokes behind eventual winner Phil Mickelson. Two weeks later, Woods returned to form at the WGC-Bridgestone Invitational, recording his 5th win of the season and 8th win at the event in its 15-year history. His second-round 61 matched his record score on the PGA Tour and could easily have been a 59 were it not for some short missed birdie putts on the closing holes. This gave him a seven-stroke lead that he held onto for the rest of the tournament. But at the PGA Championship at Oak Hill Country Club, Woods was never in contention, making 2013 his fifth full season where he did not win a major; he was in contention in only two of the four majors in 2013.

After a slow start to 2014, Woods sustained an injury during the final round of The Honda Classic and was unable to finish the tournament. He withdrew after the 13th hole, citing back pain. He subsequently competed in the WGC-Cadillac Championship but was visibly in pain during much of the last round. He was forced to skip the Arnold Palmer Invitational at the end of March 2014, and after undergoing back surgery, he announced on April 1 that he would miss the Masters for the first time since 1994. Woods returned at the Quicken Loans National in June, however he said that his expectations for the week were low. He struggled with nearly every aspect of his game and missed the cut. He next played at The Open Championship, contested at Hoylake, where Woods had won eight years prior. Woods fired a brilliant 69 in the first round to put himself in contention, but shot 77 on Friday and eventually finished 69th. Despite his back pain, he played at the 2014 PGA Championship where he failed to make the cut. On August 25, 2014, Woods and his swing coach Sean Foley parted ways. In the four years under Foley, he won eight times but no majors. He had previously won eight majors with Harmon and six with Haney. Woods said there was currently no timetable to find a replacement swing coach.

On February 5, 2015, Woods withdrew from the Farmers Insurance Open after another back injury. Woods stated on his website that it was unrelated to his previous surgery and he would take a break from golf until his back healed. He returned for the Masters, finishing in a tie for 17th. In the final round, Woods injured his wrist after his club hit a tree root. He later stated that a bone popped out of his wrist, but he adjusted it back into place and finished the round. Woods then missed the cut at the 2015 U.S. Open and Open Championship, the first time Woods missed the cut at consecutive majors, finishing near the bottom of the leaderboard both times. He finished tied for 18th at the Quicken Loans National on August 2. In late August 2015, Woods played quite well at the Wyndham Championship finishing the tournament at 13-under, only four strokes behind the winner, and tied for 10th place. Woods offered only a brief comment on the speculation that he was still recovering from back surgery, saying it was "just my hip" but offering no specifics.

Woods had back surgery on September 16, 2015. In late March 2016, he announced that he would miss the Masters while he recovered from the surgery; he had also missed the 2014 Masters due to a back problem. "I'm absolutely making progress, and I'm really happy with how far I've come," he explained in a statement. "But I still have no timetable to return to competitive golf." However, he did attend the Masters Champions Dinner on April 5, 2016. For the first time in his career, he missed all four majors in one year due to problems with his back. In October 2016, he told Charlie Rose on PBS that he still wanted to break Jack Nicklaus's record of 18 major titles. Woods underwent back surgery in December 2016 and spent the next 15 months off the Tour. He made his return to competitive golf in the Hero World Challenge.

Woods's back problems continued to hinder him in 2017. He missed the cut at the Farmers Insurance Open in January and pulled out of a European Tour event in Dubai on February 3. On March 31, Woods announced on his website that he would not be playing in the 2017 Masters Tournament despite being cleared to play by his doctors. Woods said that although he was happy with his rehabilitation, he did not feel "tournament ready." Woods subsequently told friends, "I'm done". On April 20, Woods announced that he had undergone his fourth back surgery since 2014 to alleviate back and leg pain. Recovery time required up to six months, meaning that Woods would spend the rest of the year without playing any professional golf. Woods returned to competitive golf at the Hero World Challenge in the Bahamas. He shot rounds of 69–68–75–68 and finished tied for 9th place. His world ranking went from 1,199th to 668th, which was the biggest jump in the world rankings in his career.

On March 11, 2018, he finished one-shot back and tied for second at the Valspar Championship in Florida, his first top-five finish on the PGA Tour since 2013. He then tied for sixth with a score of five under par at the 2018 Open Championship. At the last major of the year, the 2018 PGA Championship, Woods finished second, two shots behind the winner Brooks Koepka. It was his best result in a major since 2009 (second at the 2009 PGA Championship) and moved him up to 26th in the world rankings. His final round of 64 was his best-ever final round in a major.

Woods returned to the winner's circle for the 80th time in his PGA Tour career on September 23, 2018, when he won the season-ending Tour Championship at East Lake Golf Club for the second time and that tournament for the third time. He shot rounds of 65–68–65–71 to win by two strokes over Billy Horschel.

On April 14, 2019, Woods won the Masters, which was his first major championship win in eleven years and his 15th major overall. He finished 13 under par to win by one stroke over Dustin Johnson, Xander Schauffele and Brooks Koepka. At age 43, he became the second oldest golfer ever to win the Masters, after Jack Nicklaus who was 46 when he triumphed in 1986. In August 2019, Woods announced via social media that he underwent knee surgery to repair minor cartilage damage and that he had an arthroscopic procedure during the Tour Championship. In his statement, Woods also confirmed that he was walking and intended on traveling and playing in Japan in October.

Woods played in his first 2020 PGA Tour event at the Zozo Championship in October 2019, which was the first-ever PGA Tour event played in Japan. Woods, who played a highly publicized skins game earlier in the week at the same course as the Championship, held at least a share of the lead after every round of the rain-delayed tournament, giving him a three stroke victory over Hideki Matsuyama. The win was Woods's 82nd on Tour, tying him with Sam Snead for the most victories all time on the PGA Tour.

In December 2020, Woods had microdiscectomy surgery on his back for the fifth time. The operation was to remove a pressurized disc fragment that was pinching his nerve and causing him pain during the PNC Championship. Woods returned to play in his first professional tournament since his 2021 motor vehicle crash at the 2022 Masters Tournament. He made the cut and finished in 47th place at 13-over par, 23 shots behind the winner Scottie Scheffler.

In August 2022, Woods, Rory McIlroy, Mike McCarley, and the PGA Tour announced the formation of TGL, a six-team virtual golfing league. In November 2023, Woods revealed himself as an co-owner and player for Jupiter Links Golf Club, founded with investments by David Blitzer.

In March 2026, Woods competed in the TGL tournament as a member of the Jupiter Links team. Jupiter Links advanced to the finals after defeating Boston Commons. On the final day of the tournament, the team lost the championship match to the Los Angeles Golf Club. Following an arrest the same month, which occurred shortly after this tournament, it was confirmed that Woods now had physical mobility limitations, which were shown when he had to sit down while taking a sobriety test following a car crash that saw his SUV roll over, and was using hydrocodone-a prescription opioid medication which is used to treat severe, chronic pain- on a morning basis. Woods by then had undergone 20 leg surgeries and seven back surgeries. Also following his arrest, he is reportedly "stepping away" from his golf career to "seek treatment and focus on (his) health."

=== Honors ===
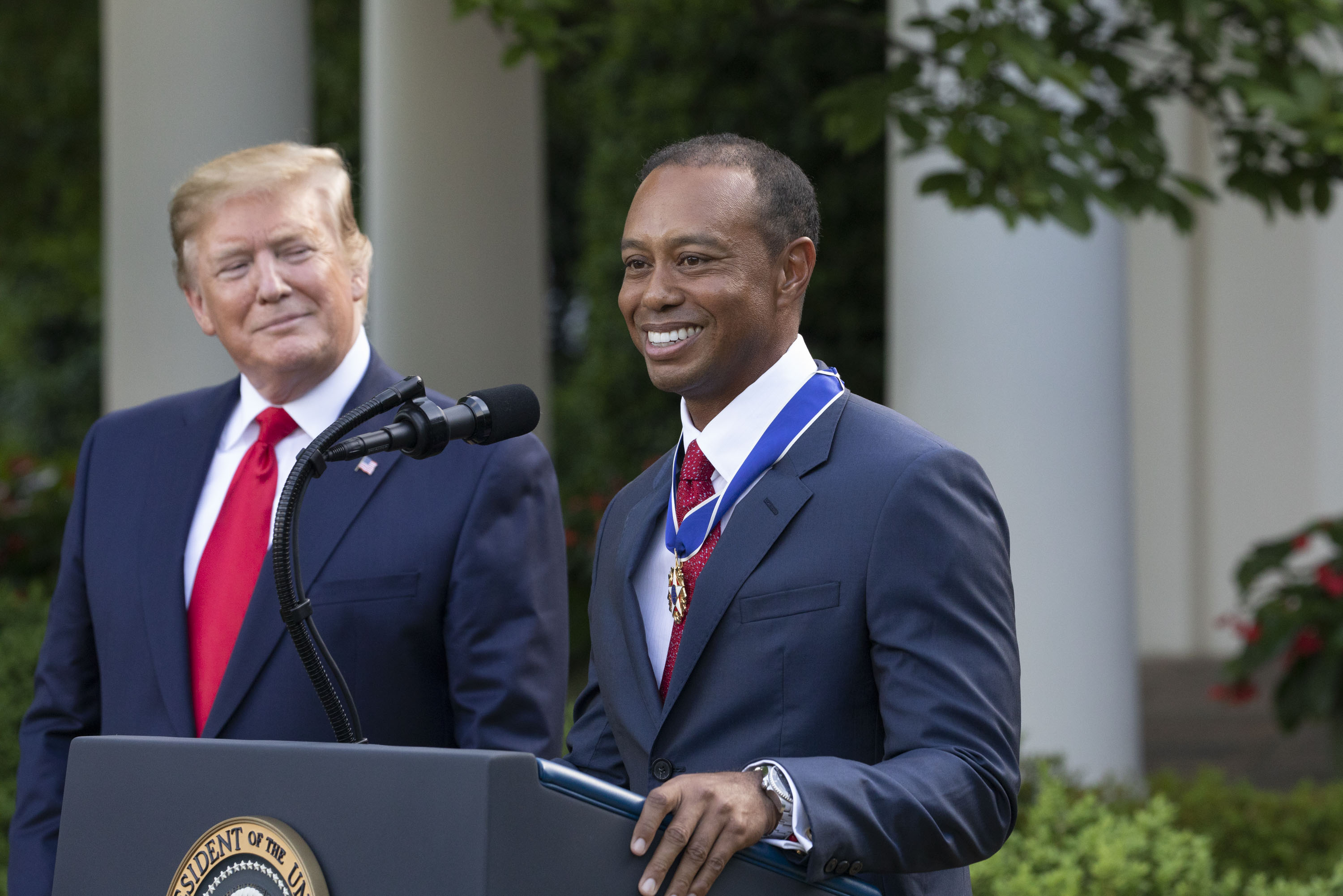
Woods receiving the Presidential Medal of Freedom from President Donald Trump in May 2019

On August 20, 2007, California Governor Arnold Schwarzenegger and his wife Maria Shriver announced that Woods would be inducted into the California Hall of Fame. He was inducted December 5, 2007, at The California Museum for History, Women and the Arts in Sacramento. In May 2019, following his 2019 Masters Tournament win, Woods was awarded the Presidential Medal of Freedom by President Donald Trump.

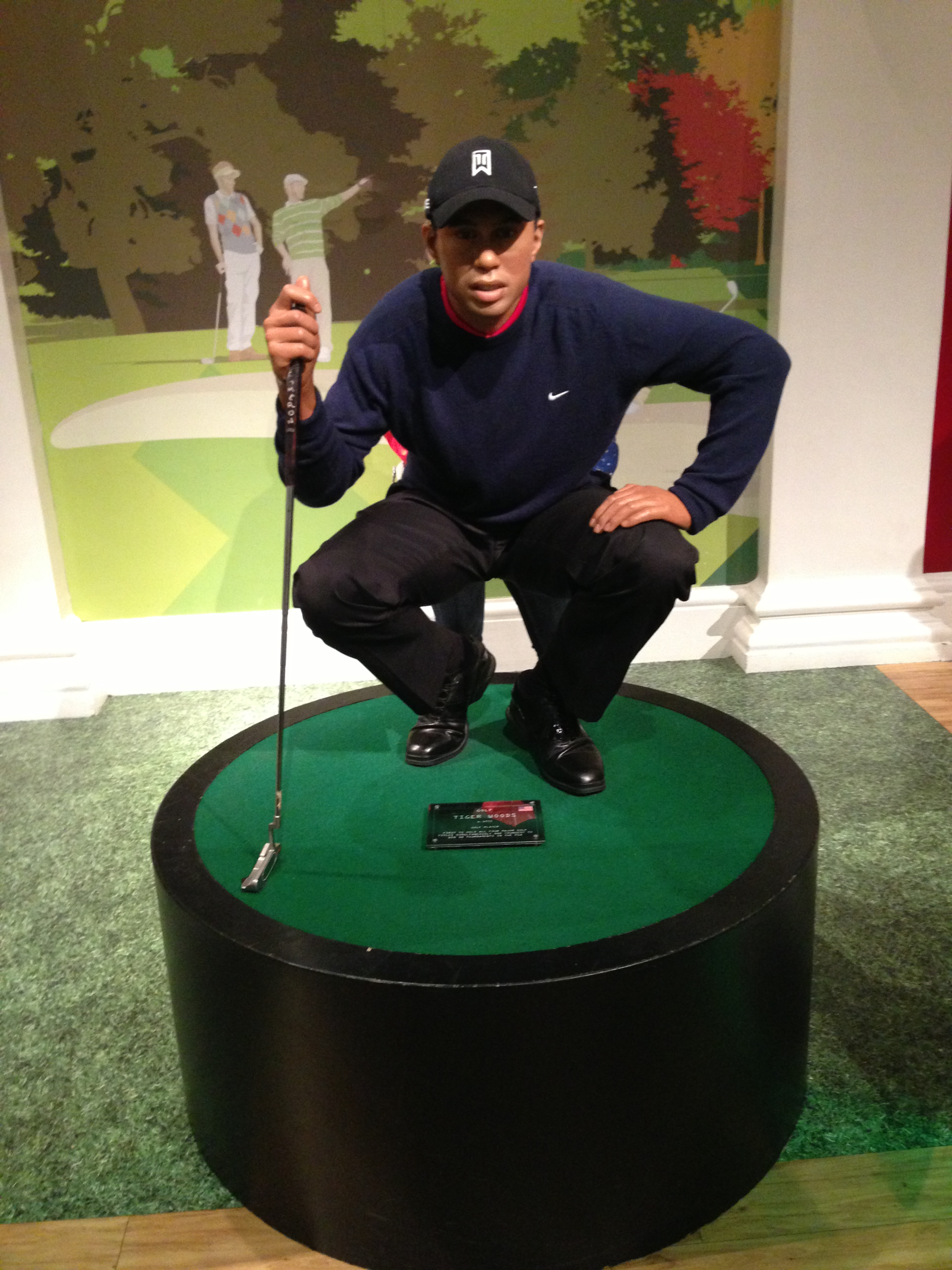
Wax statue of Woods at Madame Tussauds, London

In 2000 and 2001, Woods was named the Laureus World Sportsman of the Year, becoming the inaugural recipient of the award. In 2000 he received the BBC Overseas Sports Personality of the Year, an award given to a non-British sportsperson considered to have made the most substantial contribution to a sport. Domestically, Woods has also been recognized by U.S. publications. He was named Associated Press Male Athlete of the Year a record-tying four times, was named "Athlete of the Decade" by the Associated Press in 2009, and is one of only two people to be named Sports Illustrated's Sportsman of the Year more than once.

Since his record-breaking win at the 1997 Masters, Woods has been the biggest name in golf and his presence in tournaments has drawn a huge fan following. Some sources have credited him for dramatically increasing prize money in golf, generating interest in new PGA tournament audiences, and for drawing the largest TV ratings in golf history. His recognition as one of the most famous athletes in modern history includes being depicted in a wax sculpture at Madame Tussauds.

=== Endorsements ===
During the first decade of his professional career, Woods was the world's most marketable athlete. Shortly after his 21st birthday in 1996, he signed endorsement deals with numerous companies, including General Motors, Titleist, General Mills, American Express, Accenture, and Nike. In 2000, he signed a 5-year, $105 million contract extension with Nike, which was the largest endorsement package signed by a professional athlete at that time. Woods's endorsement has been credited with playing a significant role in taking the Nike Golf brand from a "start-up" golf company earlier in the previous decade to becoming the leading golf apparel company in the world and a major player in the equipment and golf ball market. Nike Golf is one of the fastest growing brands in the sport, with an estimated $600 million in sales. Woods has been described as the "ultimate endorser" for Nike Golf, frequently seen wearing Nike gear during tournaments, and even in advertisements for other products. Woods receives a percentage from the sales of Nike Golf apparel, footwear, golf equipment, golf balls, and has a building named after him at Nike's headquarters campus in Beaverton, Oregon.

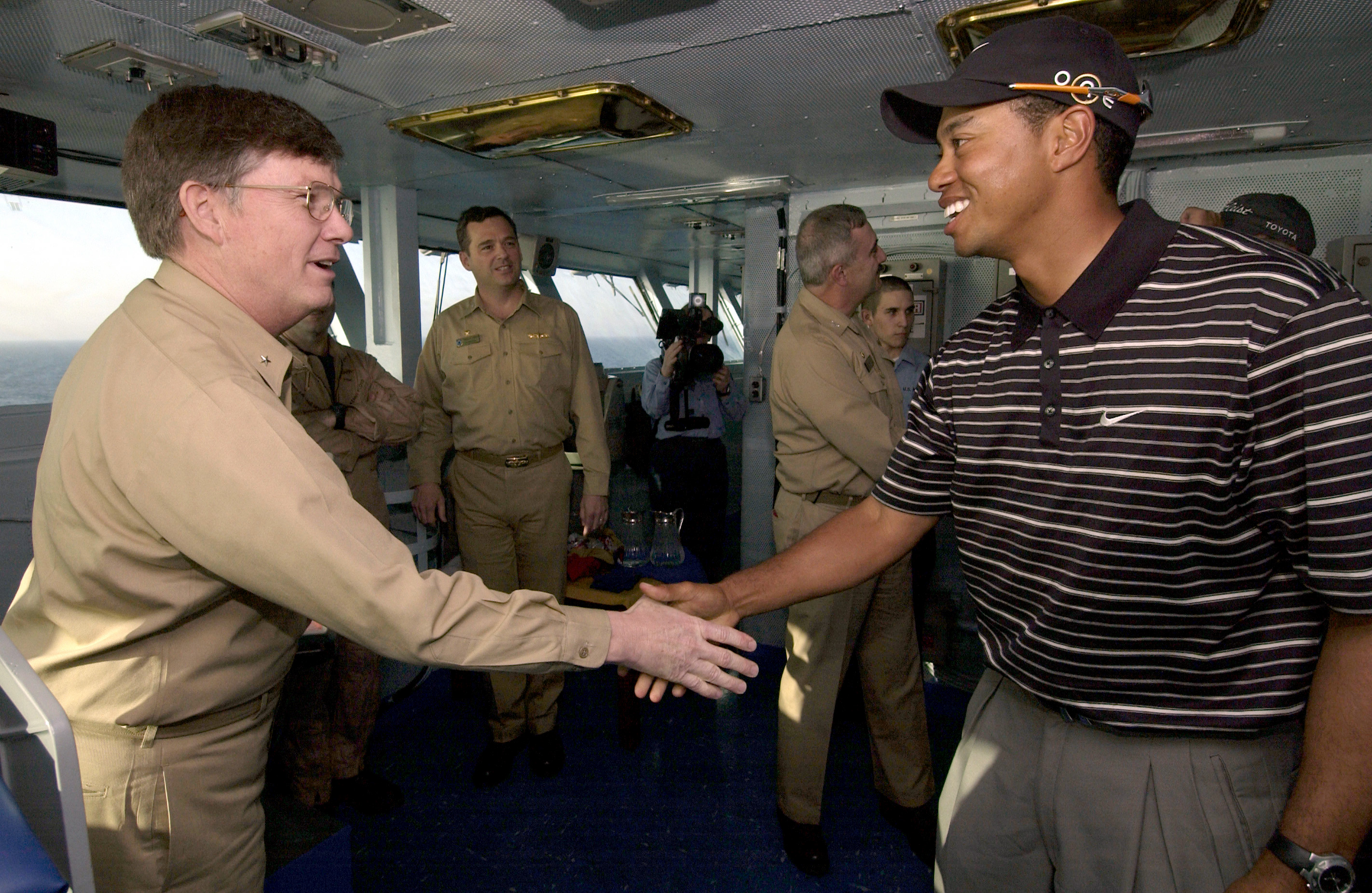
Woods visiting aircraft carrier USS George Washington (CVN-73) in the Persian Gulf before participating in the 2004 Dubai Desert Classic

In 2002, Woods was involved in every aspect of the launch of Buick's Rendezvous SUV. A company spokesman stated that Buick was happy with the value of Woods's endorsement, pointing out that more than 130,000 Rendezvous vehicles were sold in 2002 and 2003. "That exceeded our forecasts," he was quoted as saying, "It has to be in recognition of Tiger." In February 2004, Buick renewed Woods's endorsement contract for another five years, in a deal reportedly worth $40 million.

Woods collaborated closely with TAG Heuer to develop the world's first professional golf watch, which was released in April 2005. The lightweight, titanium-construction watch, incorporates features to facilitate wearing the watch while playing the game. It is capable of absorbing up to 5,000 Gs of shock, far in excess of the forces generated by a normal golf swing. In 2006, the TAG Heuer Professional Golf Watch won the prestigious iF product design award in the Leisure/Lifestyle category.

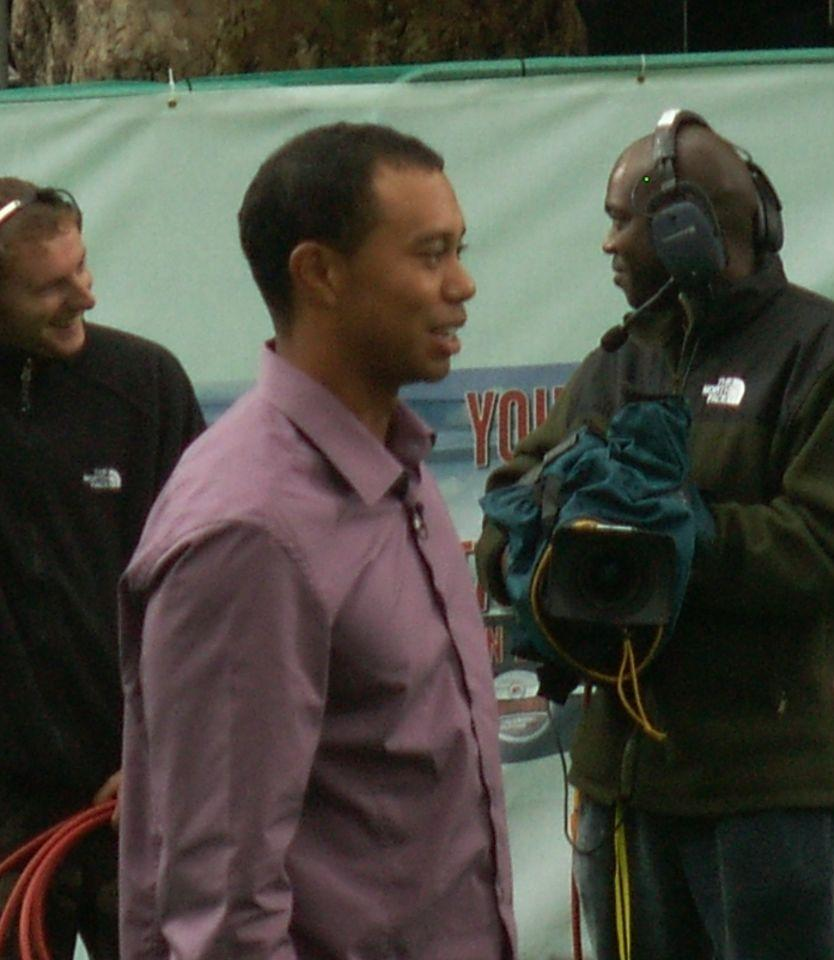
Woods preparing for a photo shoot in 2006

Woods also endorsed the Tiger Woods PGA Tour series of video games; he has done so since 1999. In 2006, he signed a six-year contract with Electronic Arts, the series' publisher.

In February 2007, Woods, Roger Federer, and Thierry Henry became ambassadors for the "Gillette Champions" marketing campaign. Gillette did not disclose financial terms, though an expert estimated the deal could total between $10 million and $20 million.

In October 2007, Gatorade announced that Woods would have his own brand of sports drink starting in March 2008. "Gatorade Tiger" was his first U.S. deal with a beverage company and his first licensing agreement. Although no figures were officially disclosed, Golfweek magazine reported that it was for five years and could pay him as much as $100 million. The company decided in early fall 2009 to discontinue the drink due to weak sales.

In October 2012, it was announced that Woods signed an exclusive endorsement deal with Fuse Science, Inc, a sports nutrition firm.

In 1997, Woods and fellow golfer Arnold Palmer initiated a civil case against Bruce Matthews (the owner of Gotta Have It Golf, Inc.) and others in the effort to stop the unauthorized sale of their images and alleged signatures in the memorabilia market. Matthews and associated parties counterclaimed that Woods and his company, ETW Corporation, committed several acts including breach of contract, breach of implied duty of good faith, and violations of Florida's Deceptive and Unfair Trade Practices Act. Palmer also was named in the counter-suit, accused of violating the same licensing agreement in conjunction with his company Arnold Palmer Enterprises.

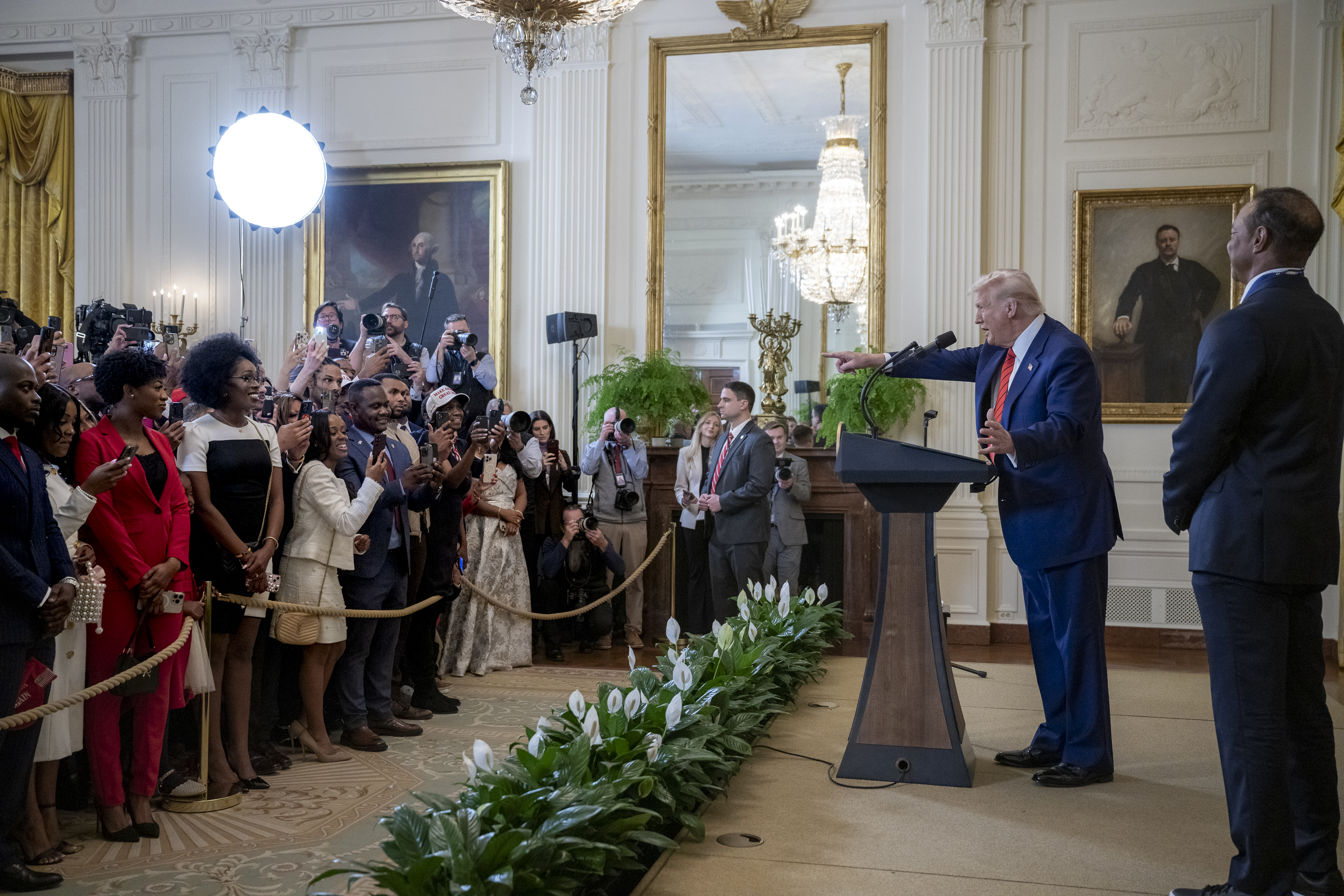
Woods and Trump at a White House reception honoring Black History Month on February 20, 2025

On March 12, 2014, a Florida jury found in favor of Gotta Have It on its breach of contract and other related claims, rejected ETW's counterclaims, and awarded Gotta Have It $668,346 in damages. The award may end up exceeding $1 million once interest has been factored in, though the ruling may be appealed.

In August 2016, Woods announced that he would be seeking a new golf equipment partner after the news of Nike's exit from the equipment industry. It was announced on January 25, 2017, that he would be signing a new club deal with TaylorMade. He added the 2016 M2 driver along with the 2017 M1 fairway woods, with irons to be custom made at a later date. He also added his Scotty Cameron Newport 2 GSS, a club he used to win 13 of his 15 majors. Also, in late 2016, he would add Monster Energy as his primary bag sponsor, replacing MusclePharm.

On January 8, 2024, Woods announced that he would be parting ways with Nike after 27 years, ending one of the most lucrative endorsements any athlete has had.

=== Accumulated wealth ===
Woods has appeared on Forbes list of the world's highest-paid athletes. According to Golf Digest, Woods earned $769,440,709 from 1996 to 2007, and the magazine predicted that Woods would pass a billion dollars in earnings by 2010. In 2009, Forbes confirmed that Woods was indeed the world's first professional athlete to earn over a billion dollars in his career, after accounting for the $10 million bonus Woods received for the FedEx Cup title. The same year, Forbes estimated his net worth to be $600 million, making him the second richest person of color in the U.S., behind only Oprah Winfrey. In 2015, Woods ranked ninth in Forbes list of the world's highest-paid athletes, being the top among Asian Americans or the fourth among African Americans. As of 2017, Woods was considered to be the highest-paid golfer in the world. In 2022, Woods was the first golfer to have a net worth over one billion dollars, making him one of the richest celebrities.

=== Tiger-proofing ===
Early in Woods's career, a small number of golf industry analysts expressed concern about his impact on the competitiveness of the game and the public appeal of professional golf. Sportswriter Bill Lyon of Knight Ridder asked in a column, "Isn't Tiger Woods actually bad for golf?" (though Lyon ultimately concluded that he was not). At first, some pundits feared that Woods would drive the spirit of competition out of the game of golf by making existing courses obsolete and relegating opponents to simply competing for second place each week.

A related effect was measured by University of California economist Jennifer Brown, who found that other golfers scored worse when competing against Woods than when he was not in the tournament. The scores of highly skilled golfers are nearly one stroke higher when playing against Woods. This effect was larger when he was on winning streaks and disappeared during his well-publicized slump in 2003–04. Brown explains the results by noting that competitors of similar skill can hope to win by increasing their level of effort, but that, when facing a "superstar" competitor, extra exertion does not significantly raise one's level of winning while increasing risk of injury or exhaustion, leading to reduced effort. Many courses in the PGA Tour rotation (including major championship sites like Augusta National) have added yardage to their tees in an effort to reduce the advantage of long hitters like Woods, in a strategy that became known as "Tiger-proofing". Woods said he welcomed the change, in that adding yardage to courses did not affect his ability to win.

== Career achievements ==
Woods has won 82 official PGA Tour events, including 15 majors. He is 14–1 when going into the final round of a major with at least a share of the lead. Multiple golf experts have heralded Woods as "the greatest closer in history". He has the lowest career scoring average and the largest career earnings of any player in PGA Tour history.

Woods's victory at the 2013 Players Championship also marked a win in his 300th PGA Tour start. He also won golf tournaments in his 100th (in 2000) and 200th (in 2006) tour starts.

Woods has spent the most consecutive and cumulative weeks atop the world rankings. He is one of six players (along with Gene Sarazen, Ben Hogan, Gary Player, Jack Nicklaus, and Rory McIlroy) to have won all four major championships in his career, known as the Career Grand Slam, and was the youngest to do so. Woods is the only player to have consecutively won all four major championships open to professionals, accomplishing the feat in the 2000–2001 seasons.

- PGA Tour wins (82)
- European Tour wins (41)
- Japan Golf Tour wins (3)
- Asian PGA Tour wins (2)
- PGA Tour of Australasia wins (3)
- Other wins (17)
- Amateur wins (21)

=== Major championships ===
==== Wins (15) ====
Year	Championship	54 holes	Winning score	Margin	Runner(s)-up
1997	Masters Tournament	9 shot lead	−18 (70-66-65-69=270)	12 strokes	(United States) Tom Kite
1999	PGA Championship	Tied for lead	−11 (70-67-68-72=277)	1 stroke	(Spain) Sergio García
2000	U.S. Open	10 shot lead	−12 (65-69-71-67=272)	15 strokes	(South Africa) Ernie Els, (Spain) Miguel Ángel Jiménez
2000	The Open Championship	6 shot lead	−19 (67-66-67-69=269)	8 strokes	(Denmark) Thomas Bjørn, (South Africa) Ernie Els
2000	PGA Championship (2)	1 shot lead	−18 (66-67-70-67=270)	Playoff^{1}	(United States) Bob May
2001	Masters Tournament (2)	1 shot lead	−16 (70-66-68-68=272)	2 strokes	(United States) David Duval
2002	Masters Tournament (3)	Tied for lead	−12 (70-69-66-71=276)	3 strokes	(South Africa) Retief Goosen
2002	U.S. Open (2)	4 shot lead	−3 (67-68-70-72=277)	3 strokes	(United States) Phil Mickelson
2005	Masters Tournament (4)	3 shot lead	−12 (74-66-65-71=276)	Playoff^{2}	(United States) Chris DiMarco
2005	The Open Championship (2)	2 shot lead	−14 (66-67-71-70=274)	5 strokes	(Scotland) Colin Montgomerie
2006	The Open Championship (3)	1 shot lead	−18 (67-65-71-67=270)	2 strokes	(United States) Chris DiMarco
2006	PGA Championship (3)	Tied for lead	−18 (69-68-65-68=270)	5 strokes	(United States) Shaun Micheel
2007	PGA Championship (4)	3 shot lead	−8 (71-63-69-69=272)	2 strokes	(United States) Woody Austin
2008	U.S. Open (3)	1 shot lead	−1 (72-68-70-73=283)	Playoff^{3}	(United States) Rocco Mediate
2019	Masters Tournament (5)	2 shot deficit	−13 (70-68-67-70=275)	1 stroke	(United States) Dustin Johnson, (United States) Brooks Koepka, (United States) Xander Schauffele

^{1}Defeated May in three-hole playoff by 1 stroke: Woods (3–4–5=12), May (4–4–5=13)
^{2}Defeated DiMarco in a sudden-death playoff: Woods (3), DiMarco (4).
^{3}Defeated Mediate with a par on 1st sudden death hole after 18-hole playoff was tied at even par. This was the final time an 18-hole playoff was used in competition.

==== Results timeline ====
Results not in chronological order in 2020.

Tournament	1995	1996	1997	1998	1999
Masters Tournament	T41LA	CUT	1	T8	T18
U.S. Open	WD	T82	T19	T18	T3
The Open Championship	T68	T22LA	T24	3	T7
PGA Championship			T29	T10	1

Tournament	2000	2001	2002	2003	2004	2005	2006	2007	2008	2009
Masters Tournament	5	1	1	T15	T22	1	T3	T2	2	T6
U.S. Open	1	T12	1	T20	T17	2	CUT	T2	1	T6
The Open Championship	1	T25	T28	T4	T9	1	1	T12		CUT
PGA Championship	1	T29	2	T39	T24	T4	1	1		2

Tournament	2010	2011	2012	2013	2014	2015	2016	2017	2018
Masters Tournament	T4	T4	T40	T4		T17			T32
U.S. Open	T4		T21	T32		CUT			CUT
The Open Championship	T23		T3	T6	69	CUT			T6
PGA Championship	T28	CUT	T11	T40	CUT	CUT			2

Tournament	2019	2020	2021	2022	2023	2024
Masters Tournament	1	T38		47	WD	60
PGA Championship	CUT	T37		WD		CUT
U.S. Open	T21	CUT				CUT
The Open Championship	CUT	NT		CUT		CUT

Win
Top 10
Did not play

LA = low amateur
CUT = missed the half-way cut
WD = withdrew
"T" indicates a tie for a place.
NT = no tournament due to COVID-19 pandemic

==== Summary ====
Tournament	Wins	2nd	3rd	Top-5	Top-10	Top-25	Events	Cuts made
Masters Tournament	5	2	1	12	14	18	26	25
PGA Championship	4	3	0	8	9	11	23	18
U.S. Open	3	2	1	7	8	15	23	17
The Open Championship	3	0	2	6	10	15	23	18
Totals	15	7	4	33	41	59	95	78

- Most consecutive cuts made – 39 (1996 U.S. Open – 2006 Masters)
- Longest streak of top-10s – 8 (1999 U.S. Open – 2001 Masters)

=== The Players Championship ===
==== Wins (2) ====
Year	Championship	54 holes	Winning score	Margin	Runner(s)-up
2001	The Players Championship	2 shot deficit	−14 (72-69-66-67=274)	1 stroke	(Fiji) Vijay Singh
2013	The Players Championship (2)	Tied for lead	−13 (67-67-71-70=275)	2 strokes	(Sweden) David Lingmerth, (United States) Jeff Maggert, (United States) Kevin Streelman

==== Results timeline ====
Tournament	1997	1998	1999	2000	2001	2002	2003	2004	2005	2006	2007	2008	2009
The Players Championship	T31	T35	T10	2	1	T14	T11	T16	T53	T22	T37		8

Tournament	2010	2011	2012	2013	2014	2015	2016	2017	2018	2019
The Players Championship	WD	WD	T40	1		T69			T11	T30

Win
Top 10
Did not play

WD = withdrew
"T" indicates a tie for a place.

=== World Golf Championships ===
==== Wins (18) ====
Year	Championship	54 holes	Winning score	Margin	Runner(s)-up
1999	WGC-NEC Invitational	5 shot lead	−10 (66-71-62-71=270)	1 stroke	(United States) Phil Mickelson
1999	WGC-American Express Championship	1 shot deficit	−6 (71-69-70-68=278)	Playoff	(Spain) Miguel Ángel Jiménez
2000	WGC-NEC Invitational (2)	9 shot lead	−21 (64-61-67-67=259)	11 strokes	(United States) Justin Leonard, (Wales) Phillip Price
2001	WGC-NEC Invitational (3)	2 shot deficit	−12 (66-67-66-69=268)	Playoff	(United States) Jim Furyk
2002	WGC-American Express Championship (2)	5 shot lead	−25 (65-65-67-66=263)	1 stroke	(South Africa) Retief Goosen
2003	WGC-Accenture Match Play Championship	n/a	2 and 1		(United States) David Toms
2003	WGC-American Express Championship (3)	2 shot lead	−6 (67-66-69-72=274)	2 strokes	(Australia) Stuart Appleby, (United States) Tim Herron, (Fiji) Vijay Singh
2004	WGC-Accenture Match Play Championship (2)	n/a	3 and 2		(United States) Davis Love III
2005	WGC-NEC Invitational (4)	Tied for lead	−6 (66-70-67-71=274)	1 stroke	(United States) Chris DiMarco
2005	WGC-American Express Championship (4)	2 shot deficit	−10 (67-68-68-67=270)	Playoff	(United States) John Daly
2006	WGC-Bridgestone Invitational (5)	1 shot deficit	−10 (67-64-71-68=270)	Playoff	(United States) Stewart Cink
2006	WGC-American Express Championship (5)	6 shot lead	−23 (63-64-67-67=261)	8 strokes	(England) Ian Poulter, (Australia) Adam Scott
2007	WGC-CA Championship (6)	4 shot lead	−10 (71-66-68-73=278)	2 strokes	(United States) Brett Wetterich
2007	WGC-Bridgestone Invitational (6)	1 shot deficit	−8 (68-70-69-65=272)	8 strokes	(England) Justin Rose, (South Africa) Rory Sabbatini
2008	WGC-Accenture Match Play Championship (3)	n/a	8 and 7		(United States) Stewart Cink
2009	WGC-Bridgestone Invitational (7)	3 shot deficit	−12 (68-70-65-65=268)	4 strokes	(Australia) Robert Allenby, (Republic of Ireland) Pádraig Harrington
2013	WGC-Cadillac Championship (7)	4 shot lead	−19 (66-65-67-71=269)	2 strokes	(United States) Steve Stricker
2013	WGC-Bridgestone Invitational (8)	7 shot lead	−15 (66-61-68-70=265)	7 strokes	(United States) Keegan Bradley, (Sweden) Henrik Stenson

==== Results timeline ====
Results not in chronological order before 2015.

Tournament	1999	2000	2001	2002	2003	2004	2005	2006	2007	2008	2009	2010	2011	2012	2013	2014	2015	2016	2017	2018	2019
Championship	1	T5	NT^{1}	1	1	9	1	1	1	5	T9		T10	WD	1	T25					T10
Match Play	QF	2		R64	1	1	R32	R16	R16	1	R32		R64	R32	R64						QF
Invitational	1	1	1	4	T4	T2	1	1	1		1	T78	T37	T8	1	WD				T31	
Champions											T6	T6									

^{1}Cancelled due to 9/11

Win
Top 10
Did not play

QF, R16, R32, R64 = Round in which player lost in match play
WD = withdrew
NT = No tournament
"T" = tied
Note that the HSBC Champions did not become a WGC event until 2009.

=== PGA Tour career summary ===
Season	Starts	Cuts made	Wins (majors)	2nd	3rd	Top 10	Top 25	Earnings ($)	Money list rank
1992	1	0	0	0	0	0	0	–	–
1993	3	0	0	0	0	0	0	–	–
1994	3	0	0	0	0	0	0	–	–
1995	4	3	0	0	0	0	0	–	–
1996	11	10	2	0	2	5	8	790,594	24
1997	21	20	4 (1)	1	1	9	14	2,066,833	1
1998	20	19	1	2	2	13	17	1,841,117	4
1999	21	21	8 (1)	1	2	16	18	6,616,585	1
2000	20	20	9 (3)	4	1	17	20	9,188,321	1
2001	19	19	5 (1)	0	1	9	18	5,687,777	1
2002	18	18	5 (2)	2	2	13	16	6,912,625	1
2003	18	18	5	2	0	12	16	6,673,413	2
2004	19	19	1	3	3	14	18	5,365,472	4
2005	21	19	6 (2)	4	2	13	17	10,628,024	1
2006	15	14	8 (2)	1	1	11	13	9,941,563	1
2007	16	16	7 (1)	3	0	12	15	10,867,052	1
2008	6	6	4 (1)	1	0	6	6	5,775,000	2
2009	17	16	6	3	0	14	16	10,508,163	1
2010	12	11	0	0	0	2	7	1,294,765	68
2011	9	7	0	0	0	2	3	660,238	128
2012	19	17	3	1	2	9	13	6,133,158	2
2013	16	16	5	1	0	8	10	8,553,439	1
2013–14	7	5	0	0	0	0	1	108,275	201
2014–15	11	6	0	0	0	1	3	448,598	162
2015–16	0	0	0	0	0	0	0	0	n/a
2016–17	1	0	0	0	0	0	0	0	n/a
2017–18	18	16	1	2	0	7	12	5,443,841	7
2018–19	12	9	1 (1)	0	0	4	7	3,199,615	24
2019–20	7	7	1	0	0	2	2	2,083,038	38
2020–21	3	2	0	0	0	0	0	64,200	223
2021–22	3	2	0	0	0	0	0	43,500	225
2022–23	2	2	0	0	0	0	0	59,560	226
2024	5	1	0	0	0	0	0	44,400	223
Career	378	339	82 (15)	31	19	199	270	120,999,166	1

*As of 2024 season

== Playing style ==
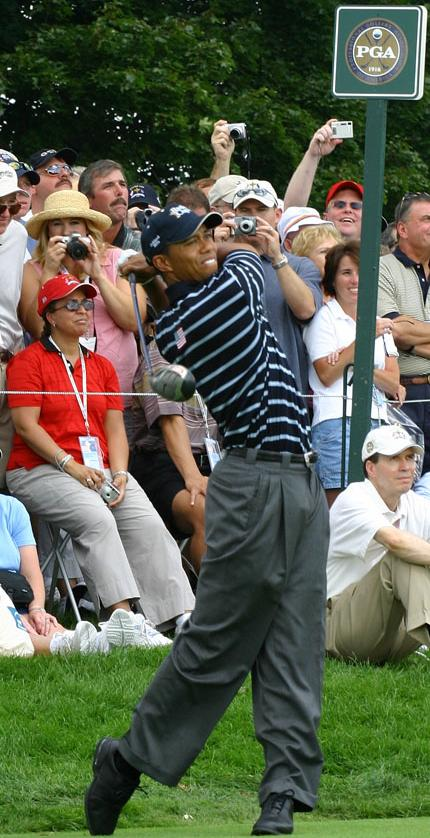
Woods practicing before 2004 Ryder Cup at Oakland Hills Country Club in Bloomfield Township, Michigan

When Woods first joined the PGA Tour in 1996, his long drives had a large impact on the world of golf, but he did not upgrade his equipment in the following years. He insisted upon the use of True Temper Dynamic Gold steel-shafted clubs and smaller steel clubheads that promoted accuracy over distance. Many opponents caught up to him, and Phil Mickelson even made a joke in 2003 about Woods using "inferior equipment", which did not sit well with Nike, Titleist, or Woods. During 2004, Woods finally upgraded his driver technology to a larger clubhead and graphite shaft, which, coupled with his clubhead speed, again made him one of the tour's longest players off the tee.

Despite his power advantage, Woods has always focused on developing an excellent all-around game. Although in recent years he has typically been near the bottom of the Tour rankings in driving accuracy, his iron play is generally accurate, his recovery and bunker play is very strong, and his putting (especially under pressure) is possibly his greatest asset. He is largely responsible for a shift to higher standards of athleticism amongst professional golfers, and is known for utilizing more hours of practice than most.

From mid-1993 (while he was still an amateur) until 2004, Woods worked almost exclusively with leading swing coach Butch Harmon. From mid-1997, Harmon and Woods fashioned a major redevelopment of Woods's full swing, achieving greater consistency, better distance control, and better kinesiology. The changes began to pay off in 1999. Woods and Harmon eventually parted ways. From March 2004 to 2010, Woods was coached by Hank Haney, who worked on flattening his swing plane. Woods continued to win tournaments with Haney, but his driving accuracy dropped significantly. Haney resigned under questionable circumstances in May 2010 and was replaced by Sean Foley.

Fluff Cowan served as Woods's caddie from the start of his professional career until Woods dismissed him in March 1999. He was replaced by Steve Williams, who became a close friend of Woods and is often credited with helping him with key shots and putts. In June 2011, Woods dismissed Williams after he caddied for Adam Scott in the U.S. Open and replaced him with friend Bryon Bell on an interim basis. Joe LaCava, a former caddie of both Fred Couples and Dustin Johnson, was hired by Woods shortly after and has remained Woods's caddie since then.

== Other ventures ==
=== TGR Foundation ===
The TGR Foundation was established in 1996 by Woods and his father Earl as the Tiger Woods Foundation with the primary goal of promoting golf among inner-city children. The foundation has conducted junior golf clinics across the country, and sponsors the Tiger Woods Foundation National Junior Golf Team in the Junior World Golf Championships. As of December 2010, TWF employed approximately 55 people.

The foundation operates the Tiger Woods Learning Center, a $50-million, 35,000-square-foot (3,300 m^{2}) facility in Anaheim, California, providing college-access programs for underserved youth. The TWLC opened in 2006 and features seven classrooms, extensive multi-media facilities and an outdoor golf teaching area. The center has since expanded to four additional campuses: two in Washington, D.C.; one in Philadelphia; and one in Stuart, Florida.

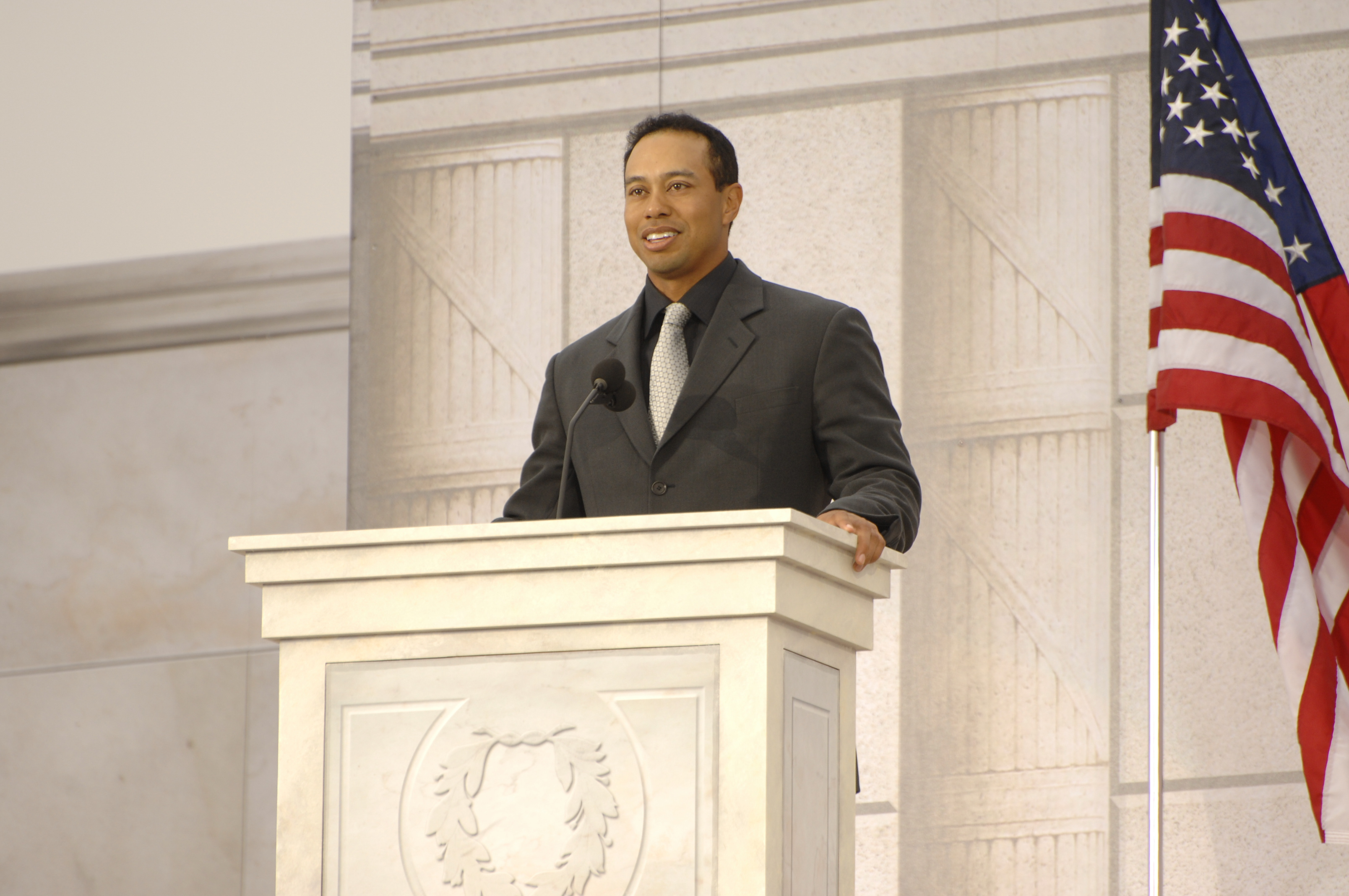
Woods giving a speech at We Are One: The Obama Inaugural Celebration at the Lincoln Memorial (January 2009)

The foundation benefits from the annual Chevron World Challenge and AT&T National golf tournaments hosted by Woods. In October 2011, the foundation hosted the first Tiger Woods Invitational at Pebble Beach. Other annual fundraisers have included the concert events Block Party, last held in 2009 in Anaheim, and Tiger Jam, last held in 2011 in Las Vegas after a one-year hiatus.

=== Tiger Woods Design ===
In November 2006, Woods announced his intention to begin designing golf courses around the world through a new company, Tiger Woods Design. A month later, he announced that the company's first course would be in Dubai as part of a 25.3-million-square-foot development, The Tiger Woods Dubai. The Al Ruwaya Golf Course was initially expected to finish construction in 2009. As of February 2010, only seven holes had been completed; in April 2011, The New York Times reported that the project had been shelved permanently. In 2013, the partnership between Tiger Woods Design and Dubai Holding was dissolved.

Tiger Woods Design has taken on two other courses, neither of which has materialized. In August 2007, Woods announced The Cliffs at High Carolina, a private course in the Blue Ridge Mountains near Asheville, North Carolina. After a groundbreaking in November 2008, the project suffered cash flow problems and suspended construction. In 2019, the 800-acre site was sold for $19.3 million and in 2024 550 acres of that were listed for about the same price. While no evidence of Woods's involvement has been found, the listing shows that development plans are still on file. A third course, in Punta Brava, Mexico, was announced in October 2008, but incurred delays due to issues with permits and an environmental impact study. Construction on the Punta Brava course has not yet begun.

These projects have encountered problems that have been attributed to factors that include overly optimistic estimates of their value, declines throughout the global economy (particularly the U.S. crash in home prices), and the decreased appeal and marketability of Woods following his 2009 infidelity scandal.

=== Writings ===
Woods wrote a golf instruction column for Golf Digest magazine from 1997 to February 2011. In 2001, he wrote a best-selling golf instruction book, How I Play Golf, which had the largest print run of any golf book for its first edition, 1.5 million copies. In March 2017, he published a memoir, The 1997 Masters: My Story, co-authored by Lorne Rubenstein, which focuses on his first Masters win. In October 2019, Woods announced he would be writing a memoir book titled Back.

=== NFT ===
Tiger Woods's "Iconic Fist Pumps Collection" is his first digital non-fungible token (NFT) collection that launched on the DraftKings Marketplace in collaboration with Autograph.io on September 28, 2021. Autograph is an NFT platform that was co-founded by Tom Brady that helped launch NFT projects with some of the biggest names in sports, including Usain Bolt, Rafael Nadal, Wayne Gretzky, and Tony Hawk. Woods's first collection offered 10,000 digital pictures of his iconic moments ranging from $12 to $1,500, and 300 of those NFTs were also accompanied by his official digital signature. The NFTs launched on the Autograph platform grants fans unique access to exclusive content, first dibs on digital collectibles, custom-made merchandise, and access to private in-person events depending on the varying utility of each NFT.

=== Sun Day Red ===
Woods partnered with TaylorMade to launch his golf apparel line, dubbed "Sun Day Red". The line was announced on February 12, 2024, and featured Woods's signature red shirt.

== Personal life ==
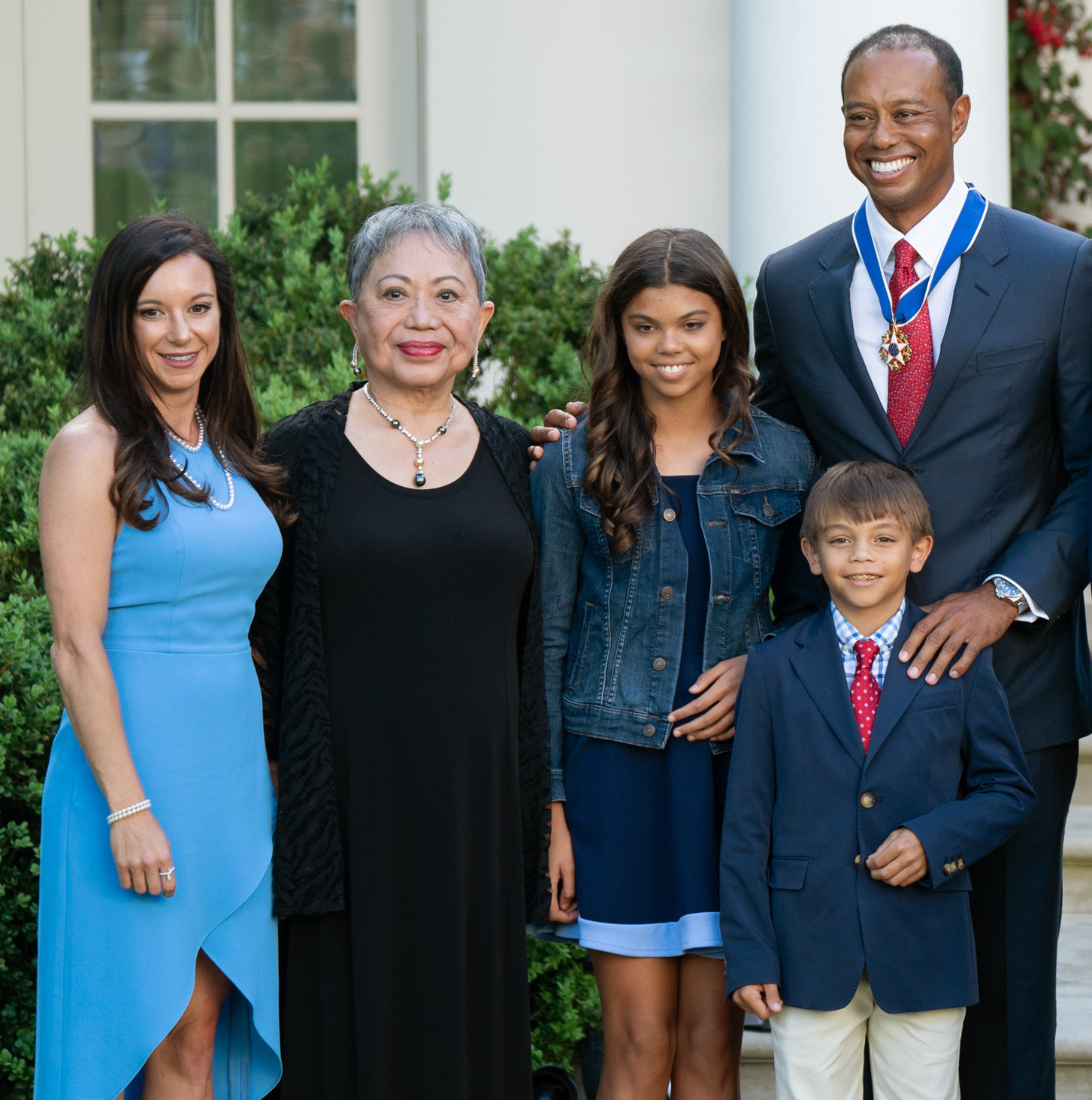
Woods after receiving the Presidential Medal of Freedom in 2019. From left to right: then girlfriend Erica Herman, mother Kultida Woods, daughter Sam Woods, son Charlie Woods, and Tiger Woods

=== Relationships and children ===
==== Marriage to Elin Nordegren ====
In November 2003, Woods became engaged to Elin Nordegren, a Swedish former model and daughter of former minister of migration Barbro Holmberg and radio journalist Thomas Nordegren. The two had been introduced during The Open Championship in 2001 by Swedish golfer Jesper Parnevik, who had employed her as an au pair. They married on October 5, 2004, at the Sandy Lane resort in Barbados, and lived in Isleworth, a community in Windermere, a suburb of Orlando, Florida. In 2006, they purchased a $39-million estate on Jupiter Island, Florida, and began constructing a 10,000-square-foot home; Woods moved there in 2010 following the couple's divorce.

Woods and Nordegren's first child, daughter Sam Alexis Woods, was born in 2007. Woods chose the name because his father had always called him "Sam." Their son, Charlie Axel Woods, was born in 2009.

==== Infidelity scandal and fallout ====
In November 2009, the National Enquirer published a story alleging that Woods had an extramarital affair with New York City nightclub manager Rachel Uchitel, who denied the claim. Two days later, around 2:30 a.m. on November 27, Woods crashed his Cadillac Escalade into a fire hydrant, a tree, and several hedges near his Florida home. He was treated for minor facial lacerations and received a citation for careless driving. Amid widespread media speculation about the cause of the crash, Woods released a statement taking sole responsibility, calling it a "private matter" and crediting his wife for helping him from the vehicle. On November 30, he announced that he would not appear at his own charity event, the Chevron World Challenge, or any other tournaments in 2009 because of his injuries.

On December 2, after Us Weekly reported on another alleged affair and released a voicemail purportedly left by Woods, he issued a second statement acknowledging "transgressions" and apologizing to "all of those who have supported [him] over the years," while reiterating his family's right to privacy. Over the following days, more than a dozen women claimed in various media outlets to have had affairs with Woods. On December 11, he released a third statement admitting to infidelity and announced that he would take "an indefinite break from professional golf."

In the aftermath, several companies reassessed their sponsorships. Accenture, AT&T, Gatorade, and General Motors ended their endorsement deals, while Gillette suspended advertising featuring Woods. TAG Heuer removed him from advertising in December 2009 and ended their partnership when his contract expired in August 2011. Golf Digest suspended Woods's monthly column beginning with the February 2010 issue. In contrast, Nike continued to support him, as did Electronic Arts, which was developing Tiger Woods PGA Tour Online. A December 2009 study estimated that shareholder losses associated with the scandal ranged from $5 billion to $12 billion.

On February 19, 2010, Woods delivered a televised statement in which he said he had completed a 45‑day therapy program that began in late December. He again apologized, saying: "I thought I could get away with whatever I wanted to, I felt that I had worked hard my entire life and deserved to enjoy all the temptations around me. I felt I was entitled. Thanks to money and fame, I didn't have to go far to find them. I was wrong. I was foolish." He added that he did not yet know when he would return to golf. On March 16, he announced that he would play in the 2010 Masters.

After almost six years of marriage, Woods and Nordegren divorced on August 23, 2010.

==== Subsequent relationships ====
On March 18, 2013, Woods announced that he was in a relationship with Olympic gold-medal skier Lindsey Vonn. They separated in May 2015. From November 2016 to August 2017, he was reported to be in a relationship with stylist Kristin Smith. Between late 2017 and late 2022, Woods dated restaurant manager Erica Herman. The couple later separated, and in early 2023 Herman filed a lawsuit seeking compensation; she later dropped the suit after a Florida judge ruled in Woods's favor. On March 23, 2025, he confirmed that he was in a relationship with Vanessa Trump.

== Legal issues ==
Dashcam video of Tiger Woods's first DUI arrest

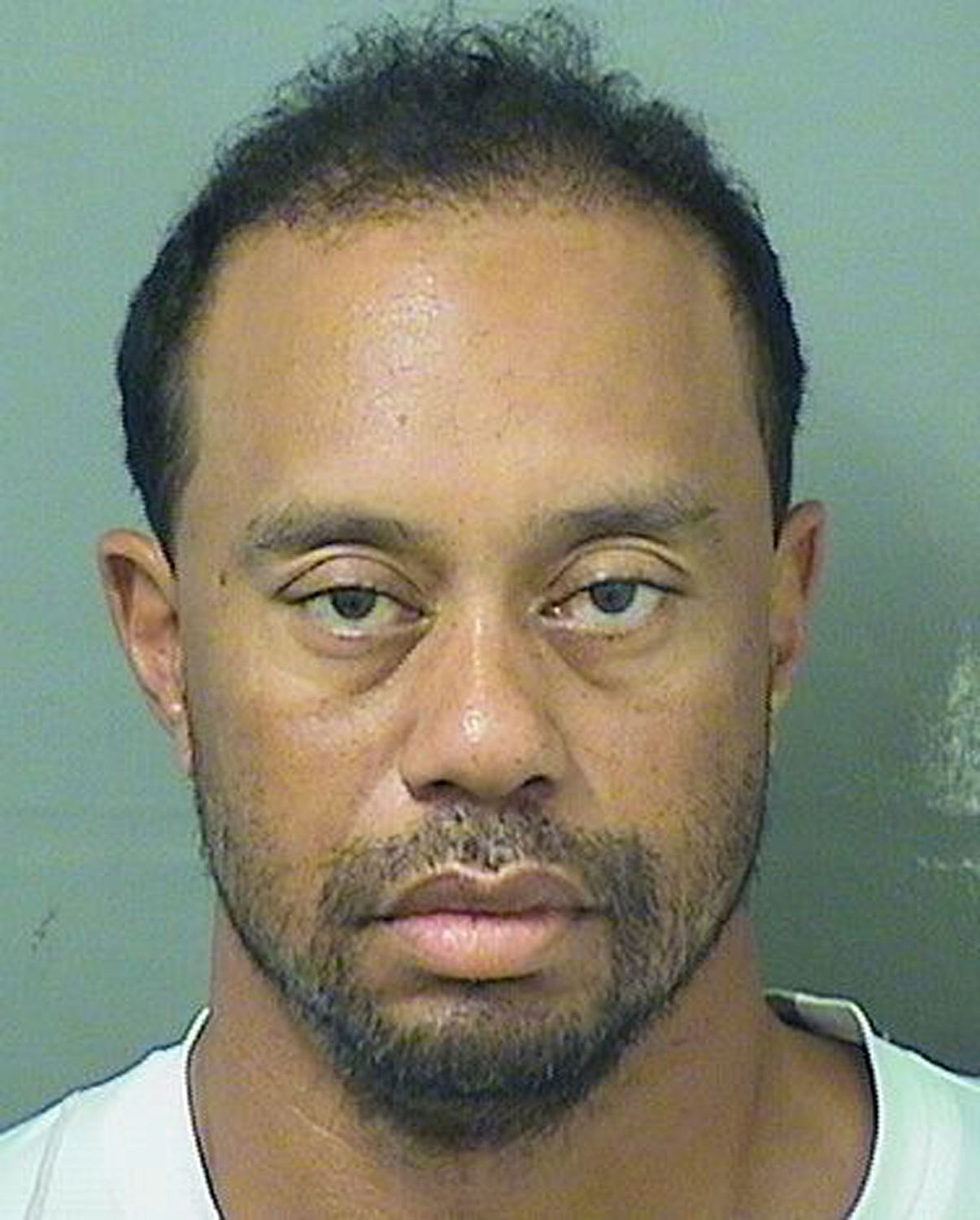
2017 mug shot

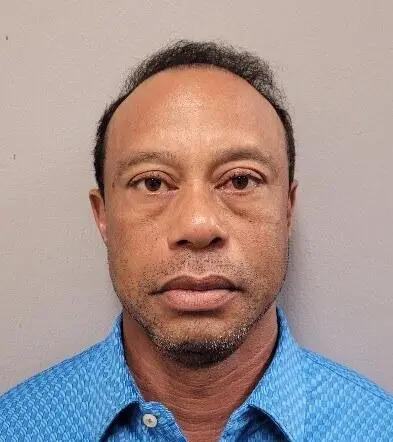
2026 initial mug shot

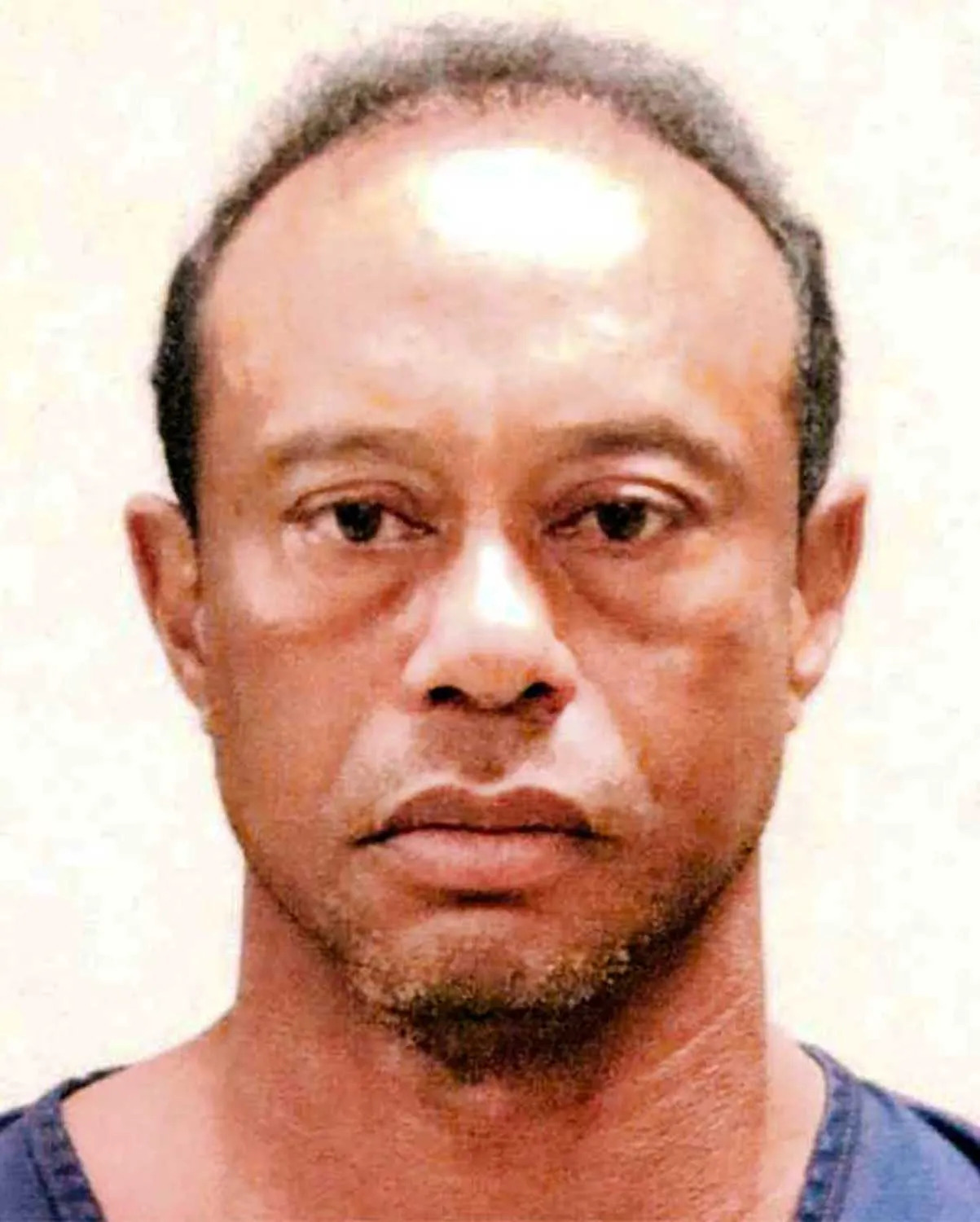
2026 second mug shot

=== 2017 DUI arrest ===
On May 29, 2017, Woods was arrested near his home on Jupiter Island, Florida, by the Jupiter Police Department at about 3:00 am. EDT for driving under the influence of alcohol or drugs. He was found asleep in his car, which was stopped in a traffic lane with the engine running. Woods later stated that he had taken prescription medication and did not realize how they might interact. On July 3, he tweeted that he had completed an out-of-state intensive program to address an unspecified issue.

At his arraignment on August 9, Woods's attorney, Douglas Duncan, submitted a not‑guilty plea on his behalf. Woods agreed to enter a first‑time driving under the influence offender program and to appear at a further hearing on October 25.

At a hearing on October 27, Woods pleaded guilty to reckless driving. He received one year of probation, a $250 fine, and was ordered to complete 50 hours of community service and undergo regular drug testing. He was prohibited from consuming alcohol during his probation, and a violation would have resulted in a 90‑day jail sentence and an additional $500 fine.

=== 2021 car crash ===
On February 23, 2021, Woods was involved in a single-vehicle rollover crash in Rancho Palos Verdes, California. He was the sole occupant of the vehicle, which was traveling north along Hawthorne Boulevard. Emergency responders transported him by ambulance to Harbor–UCLA Medical Center.

The Los Angeles County Sheriff's Department investigated the crash and determined that excessive speed was its primary cause. Investigators said Woods was traveling approximately 84 to 87 miles per hour in a 45-mph zone before the crash and found no evidence that he was impaired. No charges or citations were issued.

Woods sustained multiple leg injuries and underwent surgery following the crash.

=== 2026 car crash and arrest ===
On March 27, 2026, Woods was involved in a two-vehicle rollover crash near his home on Jupiter Island, Florida. According to local authorities, he showed "signs of impairment." No drugs or medication were found in his vehicle. A breathalyzer test detected no alcohol in his system. However, Woods declined to submit to a urinalysis. Investigators stated that he had attempted to overtake a pressure‑cleaner truck at high speed before rolling his vehicle onto its side. He was arrested for DUI after failing field-sobriety tests. Woods was charged with two misdemeanors: DUI with property damage and refusal to submit to a lawful test. He had his mug shot taken the same day and was later released. As per Florida law, he was required to spend at least eight hours in jail before posting bail. Woods told officers on the scene that he was looking down at his phone and changing the radio in his SUV, and that he did not notice the truck slowing down before his rollover crash. His arrest affidavit confirmed that Woods, who was initially reported as having been handed two misdemeanor charges, had actually been given three misdemeanor criminal charges, with his driving under the influence and property damage charges actually being filed separately. On March 31, it was revealed that Woods did not consume alcohol shortly before the crash, as a breath test confirmed, but had been using prescription painkiller medication hydrocodone, with two white hydrocodone pills being found by police in his left pants pocket. Police attested that Woods had bloodshot eyes at the time of his arrest.

On March 31, Woods's lawyer Douglas Duncan submitted a plea of not guilty to Martin County Court. In his plea, Woods also demanded a trial by jury and waived his arraignment hearing, which had been scheduled on April 23, 2026. The same day, Augusta National Chairman Fred Ridley confirmed that Woods would not be attending the 2026 Masters Tournament. In a public statement, Woods announced he was "stepping away" to "seek treatment". Woods will step down as chair of the PGA Tour's Future Competition Committee. Body camera footage that was released on April 2, 2026, shows Woods saying "I was talking to the president" during his arrest.

On April 1, Woods was granted approval to leave the U.S. to seek "comprehensive inpatient treatment".

== Other pursuits ==
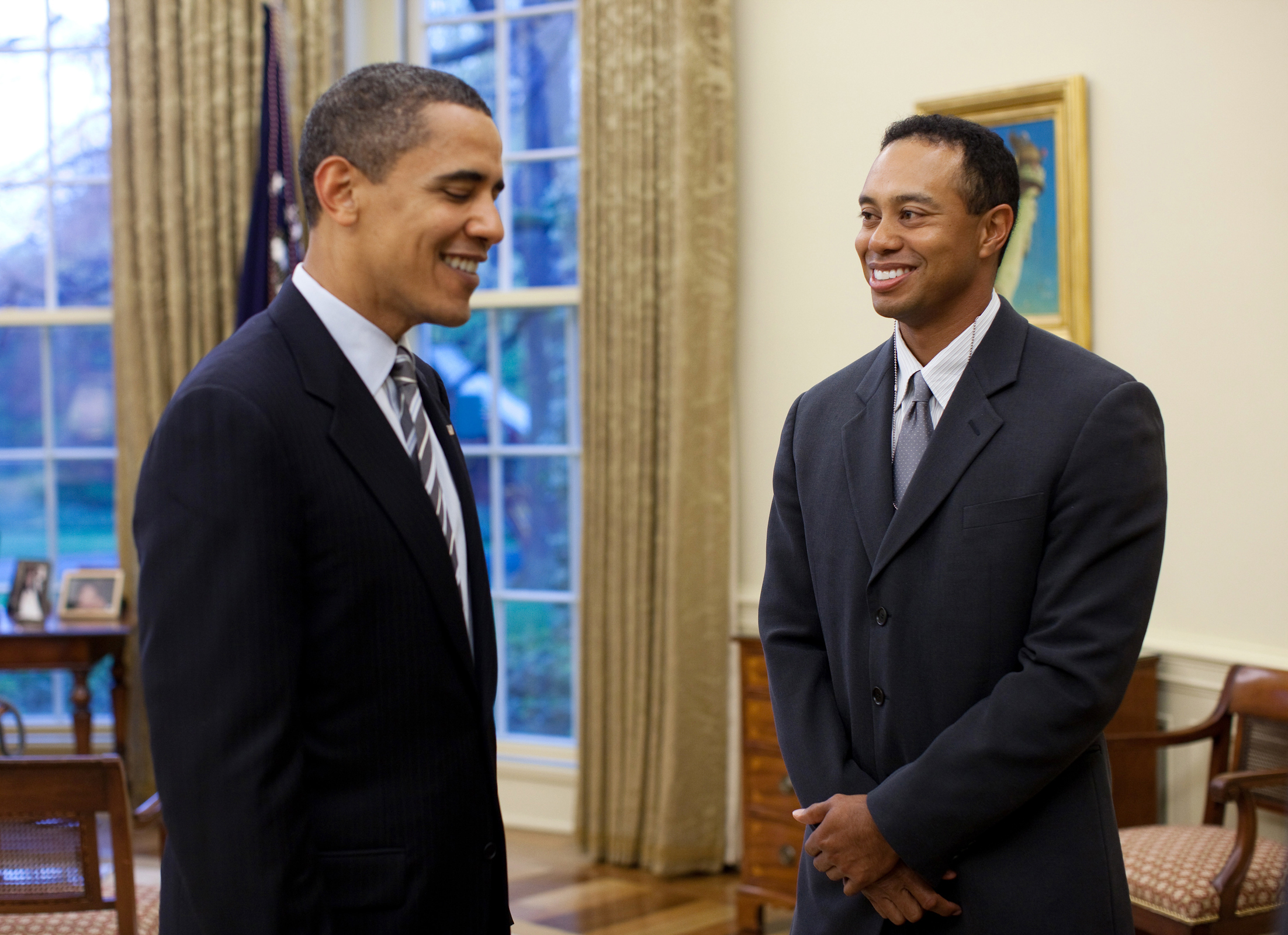
Woods meeting Barack Obama in the Oval Office, April 20, 2009

Woods was raised as a Buddhist. He actively practiced his faith from childhood until well into his adult professional golf career. In a 2000 article, Woods was quoted as saying that he "believes in Buddhism ... not every aspect, but most of it." He has attributed his deviations and infidelity to his losing track of Buddhism. He said, "Buddhism teaches me to stop following every impulse and to learn restraint. Obviously I lost track of what I was taught."

Woods is registered as an independent voter. In January 2009, Woods delivered a speech commemorating the military at the We Are One: The Obama Inaugural Celebration at the Lincoln Memorial. In April 2009, Woods visited the White House while promoting the golf tournament he hosts, the AT&T National. In December 2016 and again in November 2017, Woods played golf with President Donald Trump at the Trump International Golf Club in West Palm Beach.

== In popular culture ==
In January 2021, a two-part documentary series titled Tiger, made by filmmakers Matthew Hamachek and Matthew Heineman, was released by HBO. The film includes interviews with Woods's high school girlfriend, Dina Parr; Steve Williams, his former caddy; a friend called Amber Lauria; and Nick Faldo, among others. The soundtrack includes English punk poet John Cooper Clarke's 1980 poem "Evidently Chickentown", which was also used for its ominous sound in an episode of The Sopranos in 2007.

In March 2025, Amazon MGM Studios acquired the film rights to The Tiger Slam: The Inside Story of the Greatest Golf Ever Played by Kevin Cook. Reinaldo Marcus Green was set to direct the film, which would chronicle Woods's rise from a child prodigy to a dominant figure in professional golf. Barack and Michelle Obama's Higher Ground Productions was in discussions to produce alongside veteran producer Irwin Winkler. The film is expected to focus on Woods's achievement of winning four consecutive major championships, known as the "Tiger Slam". The book presents the story through the perspectives of Woods's caddie, coach, idols, and opponents, offering insight into his career and approach to the game.

== Bibliography ==
- 2001: How I Play Golf, Warner Books, ISBN 978-0-446-52931-0
- 2017: The 1997 Masters: My Story (with Lorne Rubenstein), Grand Central Publishing, ISBN 978-1-4555-4358-8

== See also ==
- Career Grand Slam Champions
- List of golfers with most European Tour wins
- List of golfers with most PGA Tour wins
- List of golfers with most wins in one PGA Tour event
- List of longest PGA Tour win streaks
- List of men's major championships winning golfers
- List of world number one male golfers
- Most PGA Tour wins in a year

== Notes ==
Awards and achievements
Preceded by Maurice Greene	BBC Overseas Sports Personality of the Year; 2000	Succeeded by Goran Ivanišević
Preceded by Andre Agassi	L'Équipe Champion of Champions; 2000	Succeeded by Michael Schumacher
