= Brian Tucker (executive) =

American businessman

Brian Christopher Tucker
- Born: December 27, 1975 (age 50); Pasadena, California
- Education: Wheaton College 2x(BA), Pepperdine University (MDR)
- Occupation: Businessman

Brian Christopher Tucker (born December 27, 1975) is an American businessman and philanthropist . He is the founder of Punta Brava Golf & Surf Club, president of Tactical Air Operations, and co-founder of Beyond the Brotherhood.

Tucker serves on the board of The Century Club of San Diego in support of San Diego community and local youth programs.

== Early life and education ==
Tucker was born on December 27, 1975, in Pasadena, California. In 1998, he completed a dual bachelor of art in business and economics degree from Wheaton College, followed by a master's in dispute resolution from The Strauss Institute for Dispute Resolution in the Pepperdine University School of Law,

== Career ==
After completing bachelors, Tucker joined Charles Schwab Corporation and served as president until 2006

Tucker discovered a parcel of land hidden at the tip of the Punta Banda peninsula, which extends seven miles into the Pacific Ocean. The land sits in the middle of the Bay of Todos Santos, which on June 21, 2014, was inducted into the World Surfing Reserves and is one of the six events on the World Surf League's Big Wave Tour.

After putting together the project, now called Punta Brava, Red McCombs partnered with Tucker on the design and entitlement. Golf course architect Tom Doak announced he will lead the project design on The Fried Egg podcast in 2022.

== Other work ==
Brian Tucker is also a co-founder of Iaomai Medical Ministries, a San Diego–based Christian humanitarian organization focused on improving healthcare for children and communities in Central America and the Caribbean. Tucker served on medical missions to Jamaica, Guatemala, and Mexico from 2009-2018. Tucker is fluent in Spanish, and has also been invited to lecture on development and investment issues in Baja California and has been involved with other issues in the Ensenada area. Tucker is on the Board of Young Life, the San Diego Chamber of Commerce as well as the Lincoln Club.
