= Charlie Woods =

American golfer (born 2009)

Personal information
- Full name: Charlie Axel Woods
- Nationality: United States
- Born: February 8, 2009 (age 17) Orlando, Florida, U.S.

Career
- Sport: Golf
- Status: Amateur

Charlie Axel Woods (born February 8, 2009) is an American amateur golfer.

== Early and personal life ==
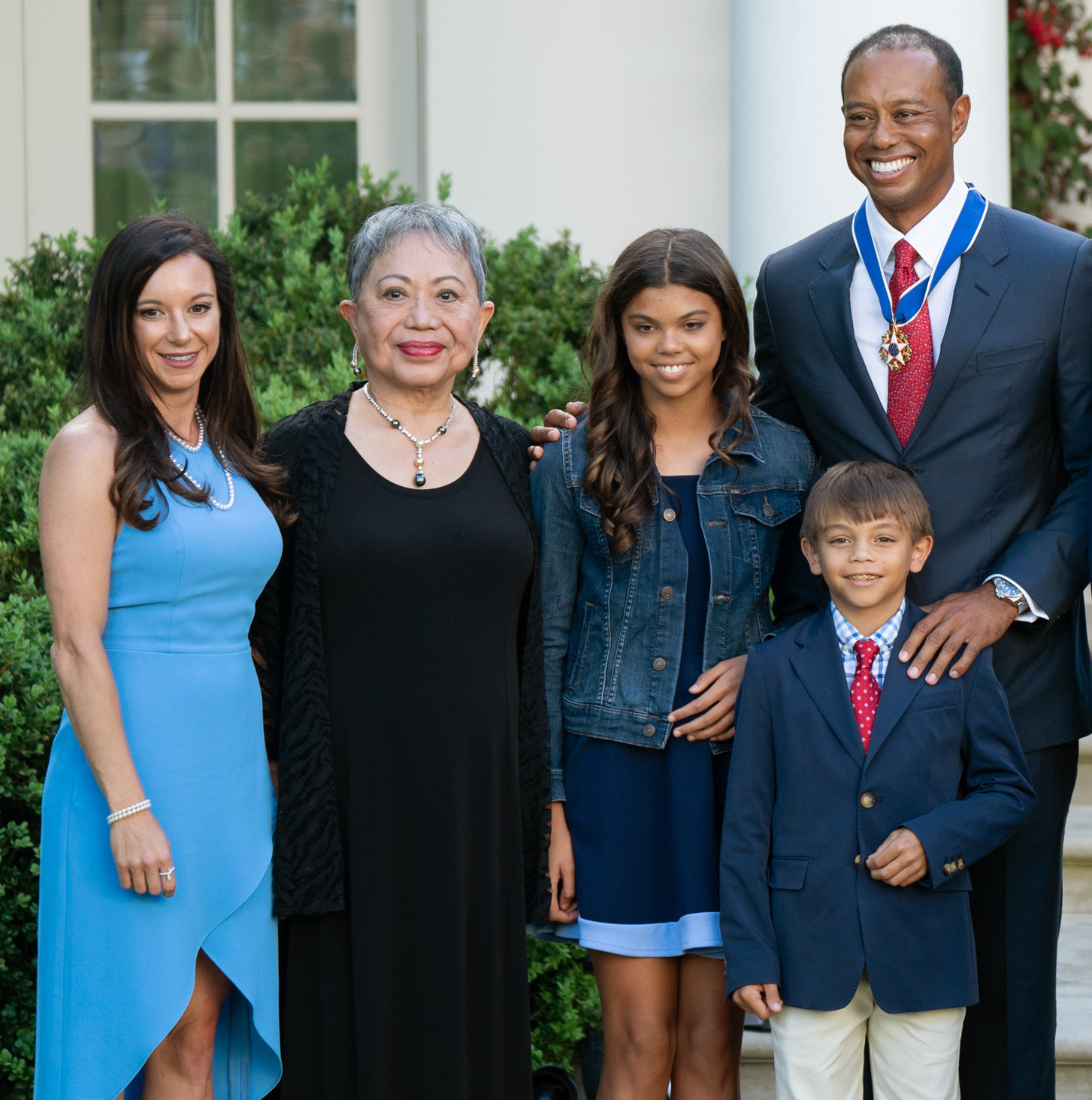
Woods in 2019 next to his father (far right)

Woods was born on February 8, 2009, in Orlando, Florida, the son of golfer Tiger Woods and model Elin Nordegren. He has an older sister named Sam Alexis Woods. Their parents divorced in 2010. He has three half-siblings from his mother's relationship with Jordan Cameron. He is half Swedish through his mother.

Woods attends The Benjamin School in North Palm Beach, Florida. He played soccer in his youth, and it has been reported that he concentrated on golf during the COVID-19 pandemic when options to compete in team sports were more limited. It has been reported that he has been coached by his father.

== Amateur career ==
Alongside his father, Tiger Woods, he competed at the 2020 PNC Championship, at 11 years-of-age he became the youngest competitor in the tournament's history. He competed alongside his father again at the 2021, 2022, 2023, and 2024 PNC Championships. In 2020, they tied for fifth; in 2021, they were runners-up; in 2022, they tied for eighth; in 2023, they tied for fifth place; and in 2024, they were again runners-up. In 2023 and 2024, Charlie's sister Sam acted as a caddie for the pair.

His father has acted as his caddie at times during tournaments, such as at the 2023 Notah Begay III Junior Golf National Championship. At an event in September 2022, Woods posted a low score of 68 in his final round.

In June 2023, Woods won Hurricane Junior Golf Tour's Major Championship in Royal Palm Beach, Florida, by eight strokes in the 14–15 years-of-age category. In September 2023, he won the 14–15 age division of the Last Chance Regional golf tournament including a round of 66. He helped his school win a Florida High School Athletic Association Class A golf championship in November 2023, finishing tied for 26th individually.

In February 2024, Woods entered his first pre-qualifying tournament for a PGA Tour event, at the Cognizant Classic. In July 2024, Woods qualified for the U.S. Junior Amateur after winning the qualifying event shooting 71 to win by one stroke. Woods failed to make the cut at +22, 18 strokes behind the cut line.

In May 2025, Woods won the Team TaylorMade Invitational for his first American Junior Golf Association victory. In August 2025, Woods placed tied for ninth place in the Junior PGA Championship.

In February 2026, Woods announced that he would be committed to Florida State to join the Florida State Seminoles men's golf team.

== Amateur wins ==
- 2024 SFPGA Jr Cup
- 2025 Team TaylorMade Invitational
