= Tiger Woods Design =

Golf course design company owned by Tiger Woods

TGR Design by Tiger Woods is the name of Tiger Woods's golf course design company. Woods has stated that he and the Company are content with one or two select projects at a time.

== Courses ==
=== Trump World Golf Club Dubai ===
The dead The Tiger Woods Dubai (Arabic: زي تايجر وودز دبيّ) project would have been the first Tiger Woods-designed golf course and golf resort in the world. The planned golf course and resort is located at Dubailand, Dubai's largest tourism and leisure complex. The golf course and resort was a joint venture between Tiger Woods Design and Tatweer, a member company of Dubai Holding.

According to Dubai Properties Group Chief Executive Officer Khalid Al Malik "Work on the course, designed by Woods and originally due to be finished by September 2009, has gotten as far as the eighth hole". (Feb 2010) On January 31, 2011, the golf course developer acknowledged the project has been shelved because of "market conditions." "It's been put on hold," Woods told the Associated Press on Sunday. On April 2, 2011 The New York Times quoted an official from Golf in Dubai, which markets the emirate as a golfing destination, as saying that the project was "as good as dead and buried". The holes that were built are expected to be reclaimed by the desert.

The planned golf resort was to contain a par 72 golf course called "Al Ruwaya", a clubhouse, a golf academy, boutique hotel and residential properties around the golf course.

After extensive delays it was announced in December 2014 that the project had been redesigned and construction had begun once again.

=== The Cliffs at High Carolina ===
The Cliffs at High Carolina would have been the company's first course in the United States. The private course would have been at about 4,000 feet in the Blue Ridge Mountains in Swannanoa, North Carolina. It would have been the eighth course developed at The Cliffs. Others have been designed by Jack Nicklaus, Tom Fazio and Gary Player. Still undeveloped, 800 acres of the site was sold in April 2019 by David Straus to New Fort LLC for $15.3 million.

=== Bluejack National ===
Woods' first golf U.S. course, Bluejack National, opened in Montgomery, Texas in April 2016. Bluejack National also includes “The Playgrounds,” a 10-hole par-3 course

=== Punta Brava ===
This golf course started being constructed in early 2009, which will be completed in late 2010, and will be 6,835 yards par 70 course. The course will be located in Ensenada, Mexico, which the name of this course translates to the meaning of "wild point." This golf course is being designed on a peninsula with 17 of the tees or greens touching the Pacific Ocean. Punta Brava will feature with its 16th, 17th and 18th holes run-up the Pacific Ocean a unique ending sequence. This will be Tiger Woods' first golf course designed on the oceanfront. The course property will have 40 estate sites, 80 villa residences, private hotel with 20 villas each having a private pool.

=== El Cardonal at Diamante ===
Located in Cabo San Lucas, Mexico, El Cardonal at Diamante opened in 2015 and ranked #26 in Golfweek's Best 2019: Top 50 Mexico & Caribbean courses.

=== The Oasis Short Course at Diamante ===
A 12-hole par 3 course located at the Diamante resort in Cabo San Lucas, Mexico. Alternate routings allow you to play the course as a 3-hole course with a par 3, par 4 and par 5.

=== Jack's Bay ===
A 10-hole short course dubbed "The Playground" located on the island of Eleuthera in the Bahamas.

=== Payne's Valley ===
TGR Design's first public course, Payne's valley is located in Ridgedale, Missouri.

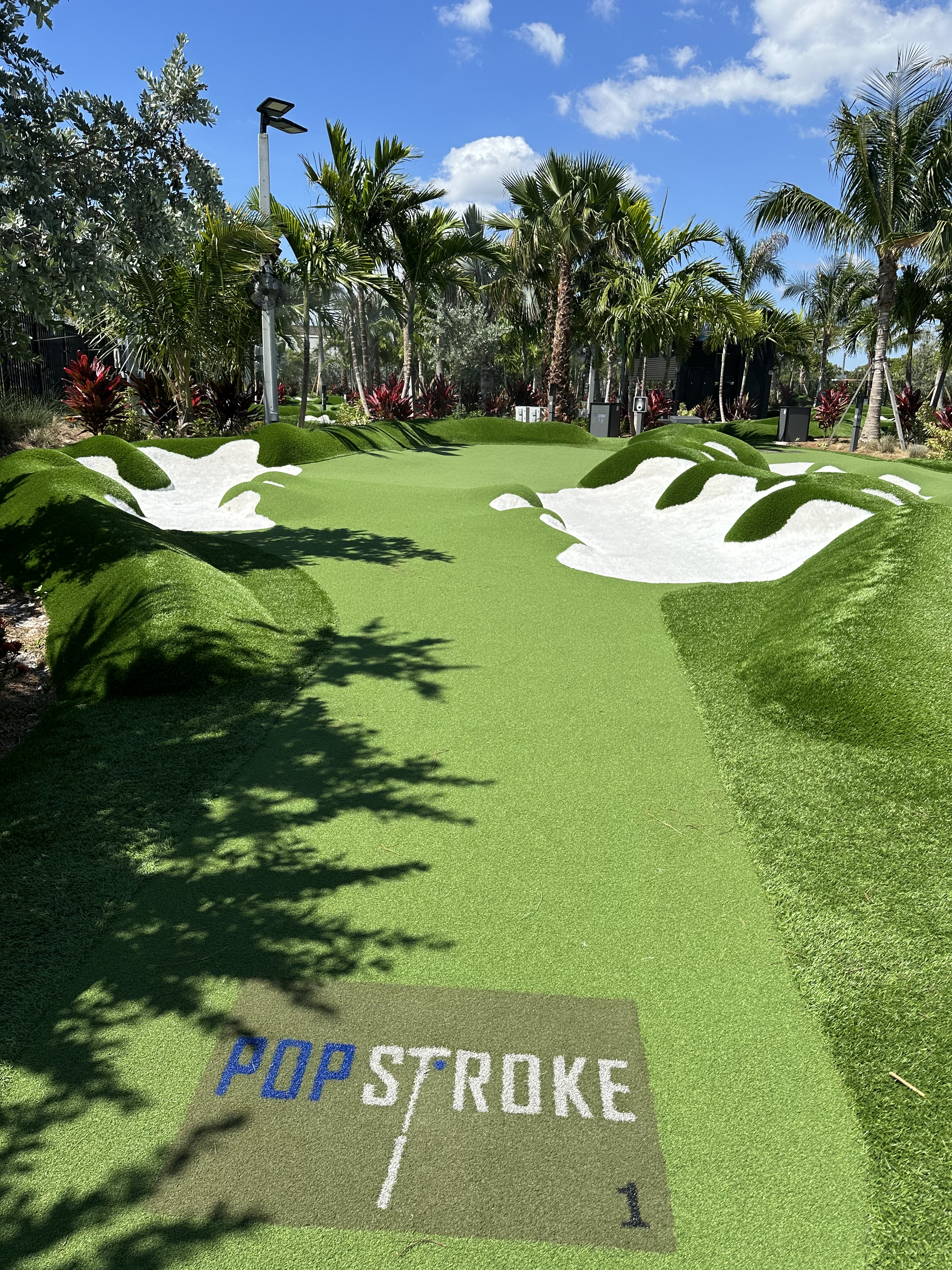
PopStroke in Delray Beach, Florida

=== The Hay at Pebble Beach ===
A 9-hole par 3 course located on the former site of the Peter Hay Golf Course in Pebble Beach, CA. Hole 2 at The Hay is an exact replica of hole 7 at Pebble Beach Golf Links.

=== South Shore & Jackson Park Redesign ===
Chicago's South Shore and Jackson Park golf courses will undergo a restoration by TGR Design and be combined into an 18-hole championship course, including practice facilities.

== Other projects ==
=== PopStroke ===
Founded in 2018, PopStroke is a golf-entertainment concept featuring putting courses, food and beverages.
