= 2005 WGC-NEC Invitational =

Coordinates: 41.008°N 81.508°W

Tournament information
- Dates: August 18–21, 2005
- Location: Akron, Ohio, U.S.
- Course(s): Firestone Country Club
- Tour(s): PGA Tour; European Tour

Statistics
- Par: 70
- Length: 7,360
- Field: 72 players
- Cut: None
- Prize fund: $7,500,000
- Winner's share: $1,300,000

Champion
- (United States) Tiger Woods
- 274 (−6)

The 2005 WGC-NEC Invitational was a golf tournament that was contested from August 18–21, 2005 over the South Course at Firestone Country Club in Akron, Ohio. It was the seventh WGC-Bridgestone Invitational tournament, and the second of four World Golf Championships events held in 2005.

World number 1 Tiger Woods won the tournament to claim his ninth World Golf Championships title, which was his fourth Invitational title. He won by one shot over Chris DiMarco, at 6-under-par 274.

== Round summaries ==
=== First round ===
Place	Player	Score	To par
T1	(Fiji) Vijay Singh	66	−4
T1	(Sweden) Henrik Stenson	66	−4
T1	(United States) Tiger Woods	66	−4
T4	(United States) Chris DiMarco	67	−3
T4	(England) Nick Dougherty	67	−3
T4	(United States) Davis Love III	67	−3
T7	(Australia) Stuart Appleby	68	−2
T7	(Spain) Sergio García	68	−2
T7	(Australia) Nick O'Hern	68	−2
T10	(England) Luke Donald	69	−1
T10	(United States) Phil Mickelson	69	−1
T10	(United States) Chris Riley	69	−1

=== Second round ===
Place	Player	Score	To par
T1	(England) Luke Donald	69-67=136	−4
T1	(United States) Tiger Woods	66-70=136	−4
T3	(Denmark) Thomas Bjørn	70-67=137	−3
T3	(United States) Chris DiMarco	67-70=137	−3
T3	(Republic of Ireland) Paul McGinley	71-66=137	−3
T3	(Fiji) Vijay Singh	66-71=137	−3
T3	(Sweden) Henrik Stenson	66-71=137	−3
T8	(Australia) Stuart Appleby	68-70=138	−2
T8	(Spain) Sergio García	68-70=138	−2
T8	(England) David Howell	70-68=138	−2
T8	(United States) Justin Leonard	72-66=138	−2
T8	(United States) David Toms	71-67=138	−2

=== Third round ===
Place	Player	Score	To par
T1	(United States) Kenny Perry	70-69-64=203	−7
T1	(United States) Tiger Woods	66-70-67=203	−7
3	(Republic of Ireland) Paul McGinley	71-66-67=204	−6
T4	(Australia) Stuart Appleby	68-70-67=205	−5
T4	(Spain) Sergio García	68-70-67=205	−5
6	(Spain) José María Olazábal	72-68-66=206	−4
T7	(United States) Chris DiMarco	67-70-70=207	−3
T7	(United States) Ryan Palmer	72-68-67=207	−3
T7	(United States) David Toms	71-67-69=207	−3
T10	(England) David Howell	70-68-70=208	−2
T10	(England) Lee Westwood	73-72-63=208	−2

=== Final round ===
Place	Player	Score	To par	Winnings ($)
1	(United States) Tiger Woods	66-70-67-71=274	−6	1,300,000
2	(United States) Chris DiMarco	67-70-70-68=275	−5	750,000
T3	(Republic of Ireland) Paul McGinley	71-66-67-72=276	−4	353,667
T3	(United States) Ryan Palmer	72-68-67-69=276	−4	353,667
T3	(Fiji) Vijay Singh	66-71-72-67=276	−4	353,667
T6	(England) Luke Donald	69-67-74-67=277	−3	200,000
T6	(England) David Howell	70-68-70-69=277	−3	200,000
T6	(United States) Kenny Perry	70-69-64-74=277	−3	200,000
T9	(United States) Zach Johnson	70-70-69-69=278	−2	135,000
T9	(Scotland) Colin Montgomerie	70-72-68-68=278	−2	135,000
T9	(Spain) José María Olazábal	72-68-66-72=278	−2	135,000
T9	(United States) David Toms	71-67-69-71=278	−2	135,000

==== Scorecard ====
Hole	1	2	3	4	5	6	7	8	9	10	11	12	13	14	15	16	17	18
Par	4	5	4	4	3	4	3	4	4	4	4	3	4	4	3	5	4	4
(United States) Woods	−7	−8	−7	−7	−6	−6	−6	−6	−5	−6	−5	−5	−5	−5	−5	−6	−6	−6
(United States) DiMarco	−3	−4	−5	−5	−5	−6	−6	−6	−6	−6	−7	−6	−5	−6	−6	−6	−5	−5
(Republic of Ireland) McGinley	−6	−7	−7	−7	−6	−6	−6	−6	−6	−5	−5	−3	−3	−4	−4	−5	−4	−4
(United States) Palmer	−3	−3	−3	−2	−2	−3	−3	−2	−3	−3	−3	−3	−3	−3	−3	−3	−3	−4
(Fiji) Singh	−1	−2	−2	−2	−3	−3	−3	−4	−4	−4	−4	−4	−4	−5	−4	−4	−4	−4
(United States) Perry	−7	−7	−7	−7	−7	−7	−8	−8	−7	−6	−6	−5	−4	−3	−3	−3	−3	−3
(Australia) Appleby	−4	−5	−5	−5	−5	−4	−4	−4	−3	−3	−4	−3	−1	−2	−2	−1	−1	−1
(Spain) García	−5	−5	−5	−5	−5	−4	−4	−5	−5	−4	−4	−4	−4	−2	−2	−3	−2	−1

Cumulative tournament scores, relative to par

Birdie	Bogey	Double bogey
