= TGR Learning Lab =

American educational institution

Coordinates: 33.838938°N 117.966568°W

The Tiger Woods Learning Center or TGR Learning Lab is an educational facility established in 2006 by the golfer Tiger Woods in Anaheim, California. A second TGR Learning Lab is set to open at Philadelphia’s Cobbs Creek Golf Course in 2024.

The Anaheim learning center is used by several thousand students, with a day program for grades 4-6 and an after schools program for grades 7-12. It has a summer program, weekend and community outreach programs and online learning programs. It has multimedia facilities and an outdoor golf teaching area. It offers courses on careers in math, science, technology and language arts.

It is housed in a 35,000 square foot (3,300 m²) facility opened in February 2006. Former President Bill Clinton and the First Lady of California Maria Shriver were at the opening ceremony in 2006.

In February 2021, the TGR Learning Lab surpassed two million students reached through its programs.
