= Punta Brava Golf Club =

Golf club in Ensenada Municipality, Baja California

Punta Brava Golf & Surf Club
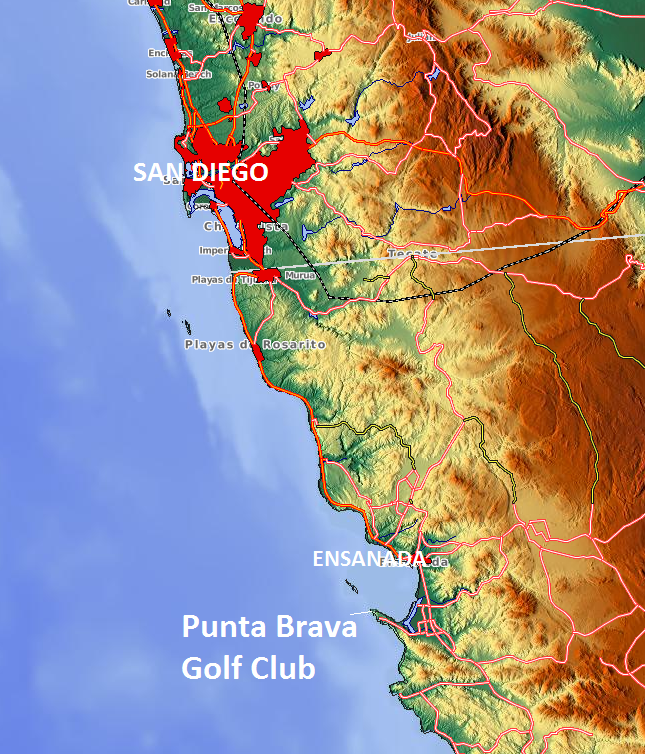
- Location of Punta Brava Golf Club
- Interactive map of Punta Brava Golf & Surf Club
- Coordinates: 31.746868°N 116.736245°W

Government

Punta Brava Golf Club is a private golf and surf club currently under development in Ensenada, Baja California, Mexico at the tip of the Punta Banda Peninsula. The site is framed by the Pacific Ocean on one side and the Bay of Todos Santos on the other. Golf course architect Tom Doak announced he will lead the project design on The Fried Egg podcast in 2022.

== History ==
In 2006, former Charles Schwab executive, Brian Tucker, set out to develop a world-class golf course after discovering a plot of land at the tip of the Punta Banda peninsula, which extends seven miles into the Pacific Ocean.

The project was officially announced at a press conference at the Hotel Bel Air in Los Angeles in October 2008 with capital support from Red McCombs
