= List of career achievements by Tiger Woods =

This page details statistics, records, and other achievements pertaining to Tiger Woods.

Woods in 2007

== Career records and statistics ==
1. Woods has won 82 official PGA Tour events, tied with Sam Snead also 82, and nine ahead of Jack Nicklaus's 73 wins. (See List of golfers with most PGA Tour wins.)
2. Woods has won 15 majors, second all time behind Jack Nicklaus' 18.
3. Woods is 14–1 when going into the final round of a major with at least a share of the lead.
4. Woods scoring average in 2000 is the lowest in PGA Tour history, both adjusted, 67.794, and unadjusted, 68.17. In 2007, Woods won the Vardon Trophy with an adjusted scoring average of 67.794, equaling his 2000 season. These are the only 2 times in PGA Tour history that a player had an adjusted scoring average under 68.000.
5. Woods has the lowest career scoring average in PGA Tour history.
6. Woods has amassed the most career earnings of any player in PGA Tour history (even after inflation is considered).
7. Woods is one of six players (along with Gene Sarazen, Ben Hogan, Gary Player, Jack Nicklaus, and Rory McIlroy) to have won all four professional major championships in his career, known as the Career Grand Slam, and was the youngest to do so.
8. Woods is the only player to have won all four professional major championships in a row, accomplishing the feat in the 2000–2001 seasons. This feat became known as the "Tiger Slam".
9. Woods set the all-time PGA Tour record for most consecutive cuts made, with 142. The streak started in 1998, he set the record at the 2003 Tour Championship with 114 (passing Byron Nelson's previous record of 113 and Jack Nicklaus at 105) and extended this mark to 142 before it ended on May 13, 2005 at the EDS Byron Nelson Championship. Many consider this to be one of the most remarkable golf accomplishments of all time, given the margin by which he broke the old record and given that during the streak, the next longest streak by any other player was usually only in the 10s or 20s. When Byron Nelson played far fewer players made the cut in a given event.
10. Woods has won a record 22.8% (82 out of 359) of his professional starts on the PGA Tour.
11. Woods is the only golfer to have won the U.S. Amateur three consecutive times (1994–1996).

=== Awards records ===
1. Woods has been the PGA Player of the Year a record eleven times.
2. Woods has been the PGA Tour Player of the Year a record eleven times.
3. Woods has been the PGA Tour Money Leader a record ten times.
4. Woods has been the Vardon Trophy winner a record nine times.
5. Woods has been the recipient of the Byron Nelson Award a record nine times.

=== Miscellaneous ===
1. Woods owns a 55–4 record when holding at least a share of the lead after 54 holes, and 44–2 record when holding the outright lead.
2. Woods has only lost once when leading by more than one shot after 54 holes. Yang Yong-eun began the final round of the 2009 PGA Championship two strokes behind Woods and defeated him by three strokes.
3. Woods has a 39–11 record when leading after 36 holes in Tour events, including an 8–3 record in majors.
4. Woods has won 14 tournaments wire-to-wire, including seven times while holding the lead outright after each round: 2000 U.S. Open, 2000 PGA Championship (tied after 1st and 4th rounds), 2000 WGC-NEC Invitational, 2002 Bay Hill Invitational (tied after 1st round), 2002 U.S. Open, 2002 WGC-American Express Championship, 2003 Western Open, 2005 Open Championship, 2005 WGC-NEC Invitational (tied after 1st, 2nd and 3rd rounds), 2006 Ford Championship at Doral (tied after 2nd round), 2006 WGC-American Express Championship, 2013 WGC-Cadillac Championship (tied after 1st round), 2018 Tour Championship (tied after 1st and 2nd rounds), 2019 Zozo Championship (tied after 1st round)
5. Woods has successfully defended a title 24 times on the PGA Tour
6. Woods has finished runner-up 31 times, and in third place 19 times.
7. Woods has spent the most consecutive and cumulative weeks atop the world rankings.
8. Woods holds the PGA Tour record for most consecutive rounds at par or better with 52. The streak began in the second round of the 2000 GTE Byron Nelson Classic and ended in the second round of the 2001 Phoenix Open. When including non-PGA Tour events, the streak was 66.
9. Woods' win at the 2005 Open Championship made him only the second golfer (after Nicklaus) to have won all four majors more than once. With his win in the 2008 U.S. Open, Woods joined Nicklaus as the only golfers to win each major at least three times.
10. Woods' victory at the 2006 WGC-American Express Championship, he became the first player in PGA Tour history to win at least eight times in three different seasons.
11. Woods' victory in the Buick Invitational in January 2007 placed him 2nd for the longest PGA Tour win streak at 7 (consecutive wins in PGA events entered), trailing only Nelson's streak of 11 wins in 1945.
12. Woods became the first golfer to win five PGA Tour events five or more times at the 2009 BMW Championship. In order of his accomplishment: WGC-CA Championship, WGC-Bridgestone Invitational, Buick Invitational, Arnold Palmer Invitational, and BMW Championship.
13. Woods' win at the U.S. Open in 2008 made him the sixth person to win the U.S. Open three or more times, the first person to win a PGA Tour tournament on the same course seven times, and the first person to win two tournaments at the same golf course in the same season.
14. Woods has hit a hole-in-one 20 times in the course of his lifetime, his first at the age of six. Three have come in PGA Tour competitions—at the 1996 Greater Milwaukee Open, 1997 Phoenix Open, and 1998 Sprint International.
15. Woods finally came from behind in a major championship to win the 2019 Masters.
16. At the 2002 Mercedes Championships at the Plantation Course at the Kapalua Resort in Hawaii, Woods hit a 498-yard drive on the par-5 18th. That shot is the longest drive in the history of the PGA Tour recorded by ShotLink, the PGA Tour's data gathering information system.

== Major championships ==
=== Wins (15) ===
Year	Championship	54 holes	Winning score	Margin	Runner(s)-up
1997	Masters Tournament	9 shot lead	−18 (70-66-65-69=270)	12 strokes	(United States) Tom Kite
1999	PGA Championship	Tied for lead	−11 (70-67-68-72=277)	1 stroke	(Spain) Sergio García
2000	U.S. Open	10 shot lead	−12 (65-69-71-67=272)	15 strokes	(South Africa) Ernie Els, (Spain) Miguel Ángel Jiménez
2000	The Open Championship	6 shot lead	−19 (67-66-67-69=269)	8 strokes	(Denmark) Thomas Bjørn, (South Africa) Ernie Els
2000	PGA Championship (2)	1 shot lead	−18 (66-67-70-67=270)	Playoff	(United States) Bob May
2001	Masters Tournament (2)	1 shot lead	−16 (70-66-68-68=272)	2 strokes	(United States) David Duval
2002	Masters Tournament (3)	Tied for lead	−12 (70-69-66-71=276)	3 strokes	(South Africa) Retief Goosen
2002	U.S. Open (2)	4 shot lead	−3 (67-68-70-72=277)	3 strokes	(United States) Phil Mickelson
2005	Masters Tournament (4)	3 shot lead	−12 (74-66-65-71=276)	Playoff	(United States) Chris DiMarco
2005	The Open Championship (2)	2 shot lead	−14 (66-67-71-70=274)	5 strokes	(Scotland) Colin Montgomerie
2006	The Open Championship (3)	1 shot lead	−18 (67-65-71-67=270)	2 strokes	(United States) Chris DiMarco
2006	PGA Championship (3)	Tied for lead	−18 (69-68-65-68=270)	5 strokes	(United States) Shaun Micheel
2007	PGA Championship (4)	3 shot lead	−8 (71-63-69-69=272)	2 strokes	(United States) Woody Austin
2008	U.S. Open (3)	1 shot lead	−1 (72-68-70-73=283)	Playoff	(United States) Rocco Mediate
2019	Masters Tournament (5)	2 shot deficit	−13 (70-68-67-70=275)	1 stroke	(United States) Dustin Johnson, (United States) Brooks Koepka, (United States) Xander Schauffele

=== Results timeline ===
Results not in chronological order in 2020.

Tournament	1995	1996	1997	1998	1999
Masters Tournament	T41LA	CUT	1	T8	T18
U.S. Open	WD	T82	T19	T18	T3
The Open Championship	T68	T22LA	T24	3	T7
PGA Championship			T29	T10	1

Tournament	2000	2001	2002	2003	2004	2005	2006	2007	2008	2009
Masters Tournament	5	1	1	T15	T22	1	T3	T2	2	T6
U.S. Open	1	T12	1	T20	T17	2	CUT	T2	1	T6
The Open Championship	1	T25	T28	T4	T9	1	1	T12		CUT
PGA Championship	1	T29	2	T39	T24	T4	1	1		2

Tournament	2010	2011	2012	2013	2014	2015	2016	2017	2018
Masters Tournament	T4	T4	T40	T4		T17			T32
U.S. Open	T4		T21	T32		CUT			CUT
The Open Championship	T23		T3	T6	69	CUT			T6
PGA Championship	T28	CUT	T11	T40	CUT	CUT			2

Tournament	2019	2020	2021	2022	2023	2024
Masters Tournament	1	T38		47	WD	60
PGA Championship	CUT	T37		WD		CUT
U.S. Open	T21	CUT				CUT
The Open Championship	CUT	NT		CUT		CUT

Win
Top 10
Did not play

LA = low amateur
CUT = missed the half-way cut
WD = withdrew
"T" indicates a tie for a place.
NT = no tournament due to COVID-19 pandemic

=== Summary ===
Tournament	Wins	2nd	3rd	Top-5	Top-10	Top-25	Events	Cuts made
Masters Tournament	5	2	1	12	14	18	26	25
PGA Championship	4	3	0	8	9	11	23	18
U.S. Open	3	2	1	7	8	15	23	17
The Open Championship	3	0	2	6	10	15	23	18
Totals	15	7	4	33	41	59	95	78

- Most consecutive cuts made – 39 (1996 U.S. Open – 2006 Masters)
- Most consecutive cuts made at the Masters – 24 (1997–2024 Masters)
- Longest streak of top-10s – 8 (1999 U.S. Open – 2001 Masters)

=== Records and trivia ===
- In all of his major victories, he has had the outright lead or a share of the lead at the end of the third round, except his victory at the 2019 Masters. He has had the outright lead or a share of the lead 11 times at the end of the second round and has only lost three times.
- Woods holds at least a share of the record for lowest 72-hole score in relation to par in one of the four majors. Note that the 'to par' and 'low 72-holes' records are not always the same because, while most championship golf courses have a par of 72, or 288 for four rounds, some have a par of 71 or 70.
- Woods is the only player to have won multiple professional majors in consecutive years, 2005 and 2006.
- Woods has won two or more majors in a year four times. He trails only Jack Nicklaus, who won two majors in a season five times (1963, '66, '72, '75 and '80).
- Woods, Nicklaus, Jordan Spieth, Brooks Koepka and Rickie Fowler are the only players to have finished in the top 5 in all four majors in a year. Woods and Nicklaus have both achieved this twice: Woods in 2000 and 2005, and Nicklaus in 1971 and 1973. Fowler joined the list in 2014, Spieth joined in 2015, and Koepka joined in 2019.
- Woods and Bobby Jones are the only golfers to have won 10 majors before the age of 30. Jones achieved 13 majors in 21 attempts, (winning percentage 62%), while Woods achieved 10 wins in 44 attempts (a 23% winning ratio).
- Woods is only the second player all-time to win three major championships in a calendar year (2000) winning the U.S. Open, The Open Championship, and the PGA Championship respectively, along with Ben Hogan who accomplished this feat in (1953) with The Masters, the U.S. Open, and The Open Championships.
- Woods is the second player to have won the career grand slam three times along with Jack Nicklaus. Woods is the only professional golfer to win four majors in a row.

==== Masters Tournament ====
- In 1997 Woods set records for the lowest aggregate and to-par score with 270 strokes (18 under par); the record was tied by Jordan Spieth in 2015 and broken by Dustin Johnson in 2020, who finished with 268 strokes (20 under par).
- Woods holds the record for the largest margin of victory at the Masters: 12 strokes (1997)
- Woods became the youngest winner in 1997 at the age of 21 years, 104 days; in 2019 he became the second oldest player to win the Masters at 43 years old.
- His win made him the first winner of The Masters, or any other (under-50) men's major, of African or Asian descent.
- After a front-nine 40 in the first round (four over par), Woods played the final 63 holes 22-under par (1997)
- In 1997 he played all 72 holes without a single three-putt.
- During his 2005 win, Woods set a record with the lowest back-to-back total for two rounds: 131 (65-66). The record was broken by Jordan Spieth (64-66) in 2015.
- In 2024 Woods made the Masters cut for the 24th consecutive year, breaking the record held by Fred Couples and Gary Player who had 23.

==== U.S. Open ====
- Woods holds the record for the largest margin of victory at the U.S. Open based on 72 holes (no playoffs): 15 strokes (2000). (In 1929, Bobby Jones had a margin of victory of 23 strokes, but that tournament was played over 108 holes, as a 36-hole playoff was played as he and Al Espinosa were tied; Jones (141) defeated Espinosa (164) in the playoff.)
- Also in 2000, Woods became the first player to finish a U.S. Open at double digits under par. (In 1992, Gil Morgan was the first ever to be double digits under par at any stage of a U.S. Open, but failed to finish in double digits under par, and indeed failed to win that event, with Tom Kite winning instead.)
- Woods was the only player to finish under par at the following U.S. Opens:
  - 2000 at Pebble Beach Golf Links: -12
  - 2002 at Bethpage State Park, Black Course: -3
- With his win in 2008, Woods equaled Jack Nicklaus' feat of winning each major at least three times.
  - The 2008 win is the final U.S. Open to play more than 90 holes (91), as subsequent playoffs are now only two holes.

==== The Open Championship ====
- Woods shares the record for largest margin of victory at a post-1900 Open Championship: 8 strokes (2000)
- Woods became the fifth player to achieve the Career Grand Slam, and the youngest player (24 years, 206 days) to do so, breaking the mark held by Nicklaus (26 years, 6 months at the 1966 Open)
- He became the fastest to win all four majors – in his 93rd sanctioned tournament, compared with 125 for Nicklaus
- He became the youngest to win a fourth major championship, breaking the mark held by Nicklaus (25 years, 80 days at the 1965 Masters)
- In 2006, Woods became the first player to win the Open Championship in back-to-back years since Tom Watson in 1982/1983
- He became the first golfer since Watson in 1982 to win the U.S. Open and Open Championship in the same year

==== PGA Championship ====
- With his 2006 PGA Championship win, Woods became the only golfer to have won all 4 majors by at least 5 strokes
- Woods was the only player in the stroke-play era (since 1958) to repeat as PGA champion until Brooks Koepka equaled this feat in 2019.
- Woods' wins at Medinah in 1999 and 2006 make him the only player to win the PGA Championship twice on the same course.
- Woods’ second round 63 in the 2007 PGA Championship tied the record for second lowest single-round score in major championship history
- Woods is the only player to win the PGA Championship back-to-back on two different occasions: 1999–2000 and 2006–2007.

== The Players Championship ==
=== Wins (2) ===
Year	Championship	54 holes	Winning score	Margin	Runner(s)-up
2001	The Players Championship	2 shot deficit	−14 (72-69-66-67=274)	1 stroke	(Fiji) Vijay Singh
2013	The Players Championship (2)	Tied for lead	−13 (67-67-71-70=275)	2 strokes	(Sweden) David Lingmerth, (United States) Jeff Maggert, (United States) Kevin Streelman

=== Results timeline ===
Tournament	1997	1998	1999	2000	2001	2002	2003	2004	2005	2006	2007	2008	2009
The Players Championship	T31	T35	T10	2	1	T14	T11	T16	T53	T22	T37		8

Tournament	2010	2011	2012	2013	2014	2015	2016	2017	2018	2019
The Players Championship	WD	WD	T40	1		T69			T11	T30

Win
Top 10
Did not play

WD = withdrew
"T" indicates a tie for a place.

== World Golf Championships ==
=== Wins (18) ===
Year	Championship	54 holes	Winning score	Margin	Runner(s)-up
1999	WGC-NEC Invitational	5 shot lead	−10 (66-71-62-71=270)	1 stroke	(United States) Phil Mickelson
1999	WGC-American Express Championship	1 shot deficit	−6 (71-69-70-68=278)	Playoff	(Spain) Miguel Ángel Jiménez
2000	WGC-NEC Invitational (2)	9 shot lead	−21 (64-61-67-67=259)	11 strokes	(United States) Justin Leonard, (Wales) Phillip Price
2001	WGC-NEC Invitational (3)	2 shot deficit	−12 (66-67-66-69=268)	Playoff	(United States) Jim Furyk
2002	WGC-American Express Championship (2)	5 shot lead	−25 (65-65-67-66=263)	1 stroke	(South Africa) Retief Goosen
2003	WGC-Accenture Match Play Championship	n/a	2 and 1		(United States) David Toms
2003	WGC-American Express Championship (3)	2 shot lead	−6 (67-66-69-72=274)	2 strokes	(Australia) Stuart Appleby, (United States) Tim Herron, (Fiji) Vijay Singh
2004	WGC-Accenture Match Play Championship (2)	n/a	3 and 2		(United States) Davis Love III
2005	WGC-NEC Invitational (4)	Tied for lead	−6 (66-70-67-71=274)	1 stroke	(United States) Chris DiMarco
2005	WGC-American Express Championship (4)	2 shot deficit	−10 (67-68-68-67=270)	Playoff	(United States) John Daly
2006	WGC-Bridgestone Invitational (5)	1 shot deficit	−10 (67-64-71-68=270)	Playoff	(United States) Stewart Cink
2006	WGC-American Express Championship (5)	6 shot lead	−23 (63-64-67-67=261)	8 strokes	(England) Ian Poulter, (Australia) Adam Scott
2007	WGC-CA Championship (6)	4 shot lead	−10 (71-66-68-73=278)	2 strokes	(United States) Brett Wetterich
2007	WGC-Bridgestone Invitational (6)	1 shot deficit	−8 (68-70-69-65=272)	8 strokes	(England) Justin Rose, (South Africa) Rory Sabbatini
2008	WGC-Accenture Match Play Championship (3)	n/a	8 and 7		(United States) Stewart Cink
2009	WGC-Bridgestone Invitational (7)	3 shot deficit	−12 (68-70-65-65=268)	4 strokes	(Australia) Robert Allenby, (Republic of Ireland) Pádraig Harrington
2013	WGC-Cadillac Championship (7)	4 shot lead	−19 (66-65-67-71=269)	2 strokes	(United States) Steve Stricker
2013	WGC-Bridgestone Invitational (8)	7 shot lead	−15 (66-61-68-70=265)	7 strokes	(United States) Keegan Bradley, (Sweden) Henrik Stenson

=== Results timeline ===
Results not in chronological order before 2015.

Tournament	1999	2000	2001	2002	2003	2004	2005	2006	2007	2008	2009	2010	2011	2012	2013	2014	2015	2016	2017	2018	2019
Championship	1	T5	NT^{1}	1	1	9	1	1	1	5	T9		T10	WD	1	T25					T10
Match Play	QF	2		R64	1	1	R32	R16	R16	1	R32		R64	R32	R64						QF
Invitational	1	1	1	4	T4	T2	1	1	1		1	T78	T37	T8	1	WD				T31	
Champions											T6	T6									

^{1}Cancelled due to 9/11

Win
Top 10
Did not play

QF, R16, R32, R64 = Round in which player lost in match play
"T" indicates a tie for a place.
NT = No Tournament
WD = Withdrew
Note that the HSBC Champions did not become a WGC event until 2009.

Performance summary

Tournament	Starts	Top-10s	Wins	Earnings ($)
Championship	15	13	7	9,606,500
Match Play	14	8	3	5,213,500
Invitational	16	12	8	11,150,375
Champions	2	2	0	335,714
Totals	47	35	18	$26,306,089

=== Records ===
- Won at least one World Golf Championships event every year from 1999 to 2009.
- All-time wins leader in World Golf Championships events (39.1% win rate).
- All-time money leader in World Golf Championships events.
- Won the WGC-World Cup with David Duval in 2000, an unofficial money WGC event, for a total of 19 World Golf Championships titles.
- Only player to have held the titles of all three of the pre-2009 events (not counting the HSBC Champions, elevated to WGC status in 2009) at the same time.

Match Play

- Woods set the record for most lopsided victory (18-hole match) in his first round match against Stephen Ames in 2006 – 9 & 8. Mathematically, it is the fastest possible win in 18-hole match play (10 & 8 would be a larger margin of victory, but the same number of holes played).
- Woods also set the record for largest margin of victory in the 36-hole final match – 8 & 7 over Stewart Cink in 2008.

Championship

- Lowest first 18-hole total 63 set the course record at The Grove
- Tied lowest first 18-hole total – 63
- Lowest 36-hole total – 127
- Largest 36-hole lead – 5 strokes
- Lowest 54-hole total – 194
- Largest 54-hole lead – 6 strokes
- Lowest 72-hole total – 261
- Largest margin of victory – 8 strokes
- Only player to record top-10 finishes in each appearance (more than two appearances)

Note: All Cadillac Championship records were set in 2006, when the tournament was known as the American Express Championship

Invitational

- Lowest 18-hole total – 61 (twice, tied with José María Olazábal)
- Lowest 36-hole total – 125
- Lowest 54-hole total – 192
- Lowest 72-hole total – 259
- Largest margin of victory – 11 strokes

Note: All records were set in 2000 and 2013 (18-hole record)

== FedEx Cup Playoffs ==
Year	Place	Points	Margin	Earnings($)
2007	1	123,033	+12,578	10,000,000
2008	70	100,000	−25,101	110,000
2009	1	4,000	+1,080	10,000,000
2010	42	1,300	–3,635	133,000
2011	132	318	−4,943	32,000
2012	3	2,663	−1,437	2,000,000
2013	2	2,743	−2,007	3,000,000
2014	218	45	n/a	0
2015	178	215	n/a	0
2018	2	2,219	−41	3,000,000
2019	42	1,069	n/a	169,000
2020	63	641	n/a	150,000
Total				28,594,000

== PGA Tour professional career summary ==
Season	Starts	Cuts made	Wins (Majors)	2nd	3rd	Top 10	Top 25	Earnings ($)	Money list rank	Adjusted scoring average (rank)
1996	8	8	2	0	2	5	7	790,594	24	69.44^{†}
1997	21	20	4 (1)	1	1	9	14	2,066,833	1	69.10 (2nd)
1998	20	19*	1	2	2	13	17	1,841,117	4	69.21 (2nd)
1999	21	21	8 (1)	1	2	16	18	6,616,585	1	68.43 (1st)
2000	20	20	9 (3)	4	1	17	20	9,188,321	1	67.79^{‡} (1st)
2001	19	19	5 (1)	0	1	9	18	5,687,777	1	68.81 (1st)
2002	18	18	5 (2)	2	2	13	16	6,912,625	1	68.56 (1st)
2003	18	18	5	2	0	12	16	6,673,413	2	68.41 (1st)
2004	19	19	1	3	3	14	18	5,365,472	4	69.04 (3rd)
2005	21	19	6 (2)	4	2	13	17	10,628,024	1	68.66 (1st)
2006	15	14	8 (2)	1	1	11	13	9,941,563	1	68.11 (1st)
2007	16	16	7 (1)	3	0	12	15	10,867,052	1	67.79^{‡} (1st)
2008	6	6	4 (1)	1	0	6	6	5,775,000	2	67.65^{†}
2009	17	16	6	3	0	14	16	10,508,163	1	68.05 (1st)
2010	12	11	0	0	0	2	7	1,294,765	66	70.32^{†}
2011	9	7	0	0	0	2	3	660,238	128	70.46^{†}
2012	19	17	3	1	2	9	13	6,133,158	2	68.90 (2nd)
2013	16	16	5	1	0	8	10	8,553,439	1	68.98 (2nd)
2013–14	7	5	0	0	0	0	1	108,275	201	71.65†
2014–15	11	6	0	0	0	1	3	448,598	162	71.93†
2015–16	0	0	0	0	0	0	0	0	n/a	n/a
2016–17	1	0	0	0	0	0	0	0	n/a	73.29†
2017–18	18	16	1	2	0	7	12	5,443,841	8	69.35 (7th)
2018–19	12	9	1 (1)	0	0	4	7	3,199,615	24	70.33†
2019–20	7	7	1	0	0	2	2	2,083,038	38	70.26†
2020–21	3	2	0	0	0	0	0	64,200	223	72.80†
2021–22	3	1	0	0	0	0	0	43,500	227	73.40
2022–23**	1	1	0	0	0	0	0	59,560	195	70.75
Career**	358	330	82 (15)	31	19	199	269	120,954,766	1	

- Green background for 1st place. Yellow background for top 10.
- * Woods qualified for the third round in the 1998 AT&T Pebble Beach National Pro-Am but decided to withdraw from the rain-delayed event. Officially, it is counted as a missed cut.
- ^{†} Woods did not play the required 50 rounds to be ranked in scoring average these years: 1996 – 41 rounds, 2008 – 26, 2010 – 45, 2011 – 27, 2014 – 21, 2015 – 32, 2017 – 2, 2019 − 42, 2020 – 28, 2021 – 10.
- Woods played in 14 PGA Tour events from 1992 to 1996 as an amateur. In this span, he made 5 cuts, with his best finish and sole top-25 performance coming at the 1996 British Open. This brings his total tally of PGA Tour events played to 369, his total number of cuts made to 334, and his total number of top-25 finishes to 270.
- **As of February 19, 2023

== Professional wins (110) ==
=== PGA Tour wins (82) ===
Legend
Major championships (15)
Players Championships (2)
World Golf Championships (18)
Tour C'ships/FedEx Cup playoff events (5)
Other PGA Tour (42)

No.	Date	Tournament	Winning score	Margin of victory	Runner(s)-up
1	Oct 6, 1996	Las Vegas Invitational	−27 (70-63-68-67-64=332)	Playoff	(United States) Davis Love III
2	Oct 20, 1996	Walt Disney World/Oldsmobile Classic	−21 (69-63-69-66=267)	1 stroke	(United States) Payne Stewart
3	Jan 12, 1997	Mercedes Championships	−14 (70-67-65=202) (Note: Shortened to 54 holes due to weather.)	Playoff	(United States) Tom Lehman
4	Apr 13, 1997	Masters Tournament	−18 (70-66-65-69=270)	12 strokes	(United States) Tom Kite
5	May 18, 1997	GTE Byron Nelson Golf Classic	−17 (64-64-67-68=263)	2 strokes	(United States) Lee Rinker
6	Jul 6, 1997	Motorola Western Open	−13 (67-72-68-68=275)	3 strokes	(New Zealand) Frank Nobilo
7	May 10, 1998	BellSouth Classic	−17 (69-67-63-72=271)	1 stroke	(United States) Jay Don Blake
8	Feb 14, 1999	Buick Invitational	−22 (68-71-62-65=266)	2 strokes	(United States) Billy Ray Brown
9	Jun 6, 1999	Memorial Tournament	−15 (68-66-70-69=273)	2 strokes	(Fiji) Vijay Singh
10	Jul 4, 1999	Motorola Western Open (2)	−15 (68-66-68-71=273)	3 strokes	(Canada) Mike Weir
11	Aug 15, 1999	PGA Championship	−11 (70-67-68-72=277)	1 stroke	(Spain) Sergio García
12	Aug 29, 1999	WGC-NEC Invitational	−10 (66-71-62-71=270)	1 stroke	(United States) Phil Mickelson
13	Oct 24, 1999	National Car Rental Golf Classic Disney (2)	−17 (66-66-66-73=271)	1 stroke	(South Africa) Ernie Els
14	Oct 31, 1999	The Tour Championship	−15 (67-66-67-69=269)	4 strokes	(United States) Davis Love III
15	Nov 7, 1999	WGC-American Express Championship	−6 (71-69-70-68=278)	Playoff	(Spain) Miguel Ángel Jiménez
16	Jan 9, 2000	Mercedes Championships (2)	−16 (71-66-71-68=276)	Playoff	(South Africa) Ernie Els
17	Feb 7, 2000	AT&T Pebble Beach National Pro-Am	−15 (68-73-68-64=273)	2 strokes	(United States) Matt Gogel, (Fiji) Vijay Singh
18	Mar 19, 2000	Bay Hill Invitational	−18 (69-64-67-70=270)	4 strokes	(United States) Davis Love III
19	May 29, 2000	Memorial Tournament (2)	−19 (71-63-65-70=269)	5 strokes	(South Africa) Ernie Els, (United States) Justin Leonard
20	Jun 18, 2000	U.S. Open	−12 (65-69-71-67=272)	15 strokes	(South Africa) Ernie Els, (Spain) Miguel Ángel Jiménez
21	Jul 23, 2000	The Open Championship	−19 (67-66-67-69=269)	8 strokes	(Denmark) Thomas Bjørn, (South Africa) Ernie Els
22	Aug 20, 2000	PGA Championship (2)	−18 (66-67-70-67=270)	Playoff	(United States) Bob May
23	Aug 27, 2000	WGC-NEC Invitational (2)	−21 (64-61-67-67=259)	11 strokes	(United States) Justin Leonard, (Wales) Phillip Price
24	Sep 10, 2000	Bell Canadian Open	−22 (72-65-64-65=266)	1 stroke	(New Zealand) Grant Waite
25	Mar 18, 2001	Bay Hill Invitational (2)	−15 (71-67-66-69=273)	1 stroke	(United States) Phil Mickelson
26	Mar 25, 2001	The Players Championship	−14 (72-69-66-67=274)	1 stroke	(Fiji) Vijay Singh
27	Apr 8, 2001	Masters Tournament (2)	−16 (70-66-68-68=272)	2 strokes	(United States) David Duval
28	Jun 3, 2001	Memorial Tournament (3)	−17 (68-69-68-66=271)	7 strokes	(United States) Paul Azinger, (Spain) Sergio García
29	Aug 26, 2001	WGC-NEC Invitational (3)	−12 (66-67-66-69=268)	Playoff	(United States) Jim Furyk
30	Mar 17, 2002	Bay Hill Invitational (3)	−13 (67-65-74-69=275)	4 strokes	(New Zealand) Michael Campbell
31	Apr 14, 2002	Masters Tournament (3)	−12 (70-69-66-71=276)	3 strokes	(South Africa) Retief Goosen
32	Jun 16, 2002	U.S. Open (2)	−3 (67-68-70-72=277)	3 strokes	(United States) Phil Mickelson
33	Aug 11, 2002	Buick Open	−17 (67-63-71-70=271)	4 strokes	(United States) Fred Funk, (United States) Brian Gay, (United States) Mark O'Meara, (Mexico) Esteban Toledo
34	Sep 22, 2002	WGC-American Express Championship (2)	−25 (65-65-67-66=263)	1 stroke	(South Africa) Retief Goosen
35	Feb 16, 2003	Buick Invitational (2)	−16 (70-66-68-68=272)	4 strokes	(Sweden) Carl Pettersson
36	Mar 2, 2003	WGC-Accenture Match Play Championship	2 and 1		(United States) David Toms
37	Mar 23, 2003	Bay Hill Invitational (4)	−19 (70-65-66-68=269)	11 strokes	(United States) Stewart Cink, (United States) Brad Faxon, (United States) Kenny Perry, (United States) Kirk Triplett
38	Jul 6, 2003	Western Open (3)	−21 (63-70-65-69=267)	5 strokes	(United States) Rich Beem
39	Oct 5, 2003	WGC-American Express Championship (3)	−6 (67-66-69-72=274)	2 strokes	(Australia) Stuart Appleby, (United States) Tim Herron, (Fiji) Vijay Singh
40	Feb 29, 2004	WGC-Accenture Match Play Championship (2)	3 and 2		(United States) Davis Love III
41	Jan 23, 2005	Buick Invitational (3)	−16 (69-63-72-68=272)	3 strokes	(England) Luke Donald, (United States) Charles Howell III, (United States) Tom Lehman
42	Mar 6, 2005	Ford Championship at Doral	−24 (65-70-63-66=264)	1 stroke	(United States) Phil Mickelson
43	Apr 10, 2005	Masters Tournament (4)	−12 (74-66-65-71=276)	Playoff	(United States) Chris DiMarco
44	Jul 17, 2005	The Open Championship (2)	−14 (66-67-71-70=274)	5 strokes	(Scotland) Colin Montgomerie
45	Aug 21, 2005	WGC-NEC Invitational (4)	−6 (66-70-67-71=274)	1 stroke	(United States) Chris DiMarco
46	Oct 9, 2005	WGC-American Express Championship (4)	−10 (67-68-68-67=270)	Playoff	(United States) John Daly
47	Jan 29, 2006	Buick Invitational (4)	−10 (71-68-67-72=278)	Playoff	(Australia) Nathan Green, (Spain) José María Olazábal
48	Mar 5, 2006	Ford Championship at Doral (2)	−20 (64-67-68-69=268)	1 stroke	(United States) David Toms, (Colombia) Camilo Villegas
49	Jul 23, 2006	The Open Championship (3)	−18 (67-65-71-67=270)	2 strokes	(United States) Chris DiMarco
50	Aug 6, 2006	Buick Open (2)	−24 (66-66-66-66=264)	3 strokes	(United States) Jim Furyk
51	Aug 20, 2006	PGA Championship (3)	−18 (69-68-65-68=270)	5 strokes	(United States) Shaun Micheel
52	Aug 27, 2006	WGC-Bridgestone Invitational (5)	−10 (67-64-71-68=270)	Playoff	(United States) Stewart Cink
53	Sep 4, 2006	Deutsche Bank Championship	−16 (66-72-67-63=268)	2 strokes	(Fiji) Vijay Singh
54	Oct 1, 2006	WGC-American Express Championship (5)	−23 (63-64-67-67=261)	8 strokes	(England) Ian Poulter, (Australia) Adam Scott
55	Jan 28, 2007	Buick Invitational (5)	−15 (66-72-69-66=273)	2 strokes	(United States) Charles Howell III
56	Mar 25, 2007	WGC-CA Championship (6)	−10 (71-66-68-73=278)	2 strokes	(United States) Brett Wetterich
57	May 6, 2007	Wachovia Championship	−13 (70-68-68-69=275)	2 strokes	(United States) Steve Stricker
58	Aug 5, 2007	WGC-Bridgestone Invitational (6)	−8 (68-70-69-65=272)	8 strokes	(England) Justin Rose, (South Africa) Rory Sabbatini
59	Aug 12, 2007	PGA Championship (4)	−8 (71-63-69-69=272)	2 strokes	(United States) Woody Austin
60	Sep 9, 2007	BMW Championship (4)	−22 (67-67-65-63=262)	2 strokes	(Australia) Aaron Baddeley
61	Sep 16, 2007	The Tour Championship (2)	−23 (64-63-64-66=257)	8 strokes	(United States) Mark Calcavecchia, (United States) Zach Johnson
62	Jan 27, 2008	Buick Invitational (6)	−19 (67-65-66-71=269)	8 strokes	(Japan) Ryuji Imada
63	Feb 24, 2008	WGC-Accenture Match Play Championship (3)	8 and 7		(United States) Stewart Cink
64	Mar 16, 2008	Arnold Palmer Invitational (5)	−10 (70-68-66-66=270)	1 stroke	(United States) Bart Bryant
65	Jun 16, 2008	U.S. Open (3)	−1 (72-68-70-73=283)	Playoff	(United States) Rocco Mediate
66	Mar 29, 2009	Arnold Palmer Invitational (6)	−5 (68-69-71-67=275)	1 stroke	(United States) Sean O'Hair
67	Jun 7, 2009	Memorial Tournament (4)	−12 (69-74-68-65=276)	1 stroke	(United States) Jim Furyk
68	Jul 5, 2009	AT&T National	−13 (64-66-70-67=267)	1 stroke	(United States) Hunter Mahan
69	Aug 2, 2009	Buick Open (3)	−20 (71-63-65-69=268)	3 strokes	(Australia) Greg Chalmers, (Australia) John Senden, (United States) Roland Thatcher
70	Aug 9, 2009	WGC-Bridgestone Invitational (7)	−12 (68-70-65-65=268)	4 strokes	(Australia) Robert Allenby, (Republic of Ireland) Pádraig Harrington
71	Sep 13, 2009	BMW Championship (5)	−19 (68-67-62-68=265)	8 strokes	(United States) Jim Furyk, (Australia) Marc Leishman
72	Mar 25, 2012	Arnold Palmer Invitational (7)	−13 (69-65-71-70=275)	5 strokes	(Northern Ireland) Graeme McDowell
73	Jun 3, 2012	Memorial Tournament (5)	−9 (70-69-73-67=279)	2 strokes	(Argentina) Andrés Romero, (South Africa) Rory Sabbatini
74	Jul 1, 2012	AT&T National (2)	−8 (72-68-67-69=276)	2 strokes	(United States) Bo Van Pelt
75	Jan 28, 2013	Farmers Insurance Open (7)	−14 (68-65-69-72=274)	4 strokes	(United States) Brandt Snedeker, (United States) Josh Teater
76	Mar 10, 2013	WGC-Cadillac Championship (7)	−19 (66-65-67-71=269)	2 strokes	(United States) Steve Stricker
77	Mar 25, 2013	Arnold Palmer Invitational (8)	−13 (69-70-66-70=275)	2 strokes	(England) Justin Rose
78	May 12, 2013	The Players Championship (2)	−13 (67-67-71-70=275)	2 strokes	(Sweden) David Lingmerth, (United States) Jeff Maggert, (United States) Kevin Streelman
79	Aug 4, 2013	WGC-Bridgestone Invitational (8)	−15 (66-61-68-70=265)	7 strokes	(United States) Keegan Bradley, (Sweden) Henrik Stenson
80	Sep 23, 2018	Tour Championship (3)	−11 (65-68-65-71=269)	2 strokes	(United States) Billy Horschel
81	Apr 14, 2019	Masters Tournament (5)	−13 (70-68-67-70=275)	1 stroke	(United States) Dustin Johnson, (United States) Brooks Koepka, (United States) Xander Schauffele
82	Oct 28, 2019	Zozo Championship^{1}	−19 (64-64-66-67=261)	3 strokes	(Japan) Hideki Matsuyama

^{1}Co-sanctioned by the Japan Golf Tour

PGA Tour playoff record (11–1)

No.	Year	Tournament	Opponent(s)	Result
1	1996	Las Vegas Invitational	(United States) Davis Love III	Won with par on first extra hole
2	1997	Mercedes Championships	(United States) Tom Lehman	Won with birdie on first extra hole
3	1998	Nissan Open	(United States) Billy Mayfair	Lost to birdie on first extra hole
4	1999	WGC-American Express Championship	(Spain) Miguel Ángel Jiménez	Won with birdie on first extra hole
5	2000	Mercedes Championships	(South Africa) Ernie Els	Won with birdie on second extra hole
6	2000	PGA Championship	(United States) Bob May	Won three-hole aggregate playoff; Woods: −1 (3-4-5=12), May: E (4-4-5=13)
7	2001	WGC-NEC Invitational	(United States) Jim Furyk	Won with birdie on seventh extra hole
8	2005	Masters Tournament	(United States) Chris DiMarco	Won with birdie on first extra hole
9	2005	WGC-American Express Championship	(United States) John Daly	Won with par on second extra hole
10	2006	Buick Invitational	(Australia) Nathan Green, (Spain) José María Olazábal	Won with par on second extra hole Green eliminated by par on first hole
11	2006	WGC-Bridgestone Invitational	(United States) Stewart Cink	Won with birdie on fourth extra hole
12	2008	U.S. Open	(United States) Rocco Mediate	Won with par on first extra hole after 18-hole playoff; Woods: E (71), Mediate: E (71)

=== European Tour wins (41) (Note: This table is the European Tour's official Woods' victories on their tour, which gives Woods a total of 41 European Tour wins. Woods' worldwide tournament playoff record is 16–6.) ===
Legend
Major championships (15)
World Golf Championships (18)
Other European Tour (8)

No.	Date	Tournament	Winning score	Margin of victory	Runner(s)-up
1	Apr 13, 1997	Masters Tournament	−18 (70-66-65-69=270)	12 strokes	(United States) Tom Kite
2	Jan 25, 1998	Johnnie Walker Classic^{1}	−9 (72-71-71-65=279)	Playoff	(South Africa) Ernie Els
3	May 24, 1999	Deutsche Bank - SAP Open TPC of Europe	−15 (69-68-68-68=273)	3 strokes	(South Africa) Retief Goosen
4	Aug 15, 1999	PGA Championship	−11 (70-67-68-72=277)	1 stroke	(Spain) Sergio García
5	Aug 29, 1999	WGC-NEC Invitational	−10 (66-71-62-71=270)	1 stroke	(United States) Phil Mickelson
6	Nov 7, 1999	WGC-American Express Championship	−6 (71-69-70-68=278)	Playoff	(Spain) Miguel Ángel Jiménez
7	Jun 18, 2000	U.S. Open	−12 (65-69-71-67=272)	15 strokes	(South Africa) Ernie Els, (Spain) Miguel Ángel Jiménez
8	Jul 23, 2000	The Open Championship	−19 (67-66-67-69=269)	8 strokes	(Denmark) Thomas Bjørn, (South Africa) Ernie Els
9	Aug 20, 2000	PGA Championship (2)	−18 (66-67-70-67=270)	Playoff	(United States) Bob May
10	Aug 27, 2000	WGC-NEC Invitational (2)	−21 (64-61-67-67=259)	11 strokes	(United States) Justin Leonard, (Wales) Phillip Price
11	Nov 19, 2000 (2001 season)	Johnnie Walker Classic^{1,2} (2)	−25 (68-65-65-65=263)	3 strokes	(Australia) Geoff Ogilvy
12	Apr 8, 2001	Masters Tournament (2)	−16 (70-66-68-68=272)	2 strokes	(United States) David Duval
13	May 20, 2001	Deutsche Bank - SAP Open TPC of Europe (2)	−22 (69-68-63-66=266)	4 strokes	(New Zealand) Michael Campbell
14	Aug 26, 2001	WGC-NEC Invitational (3)	−12 (66-67-66-69=268)	Playoff	(United States) Jim Furyk
15	Apr 14, 2002	Masters Tournament (3)	−12 (70-69-66-71=276)	3 strokes	(South Africa) Retief Goosen
16	May 19, 2002	Deutsche Bank - SAP Open TPC of Europe (3)	−20 (69-67-64-68=268)	Playoff	(Scotland) Colin Montgomerie
17	Jun 16, 2002	U.S. Open (2)	−3 (67-68-70-72=277)	3 strokes	(United States) Phil Mickelson
18	Sep 22, 2002	WGC-American Express Championship (2)	−25 (65-65-67-66=263)	1 stroke	(South Africa) Retief Goosen
19	Mar 2, 2003	WGC-Accenture Match Play Championship	2 and 1		(United States) David Toms
20	Oct 5, 2003	WGC-American Express Championship (3)	−6 (67-66-69-72=274)	2 strokes	(Australia) Stuart Appleby, (United States) Tim Herron, (Fiji) Vijay Singh
21	Feb 29, 2004	WGC-Accenture Match Play Championship (2)	3 and 2		(United States) Davis Love III
22	Apr 10, 2005	Masters Tournament (4)	−12 (74-66-65-71=276)	Playoff	(United States) Chris DiMarco
23	Jul 17, 2005	The Open Championship (2)	−14 (66-67-71-70=274)	5 strokes	(Scotland) Colin Montgomerie
24	Aug 21, 2005	WGC-NEC Invitational (4)	−6 (66-70-67-71=274)	1 stroke	(United States) Chris DiMarco
25	Oct 9, 2005	WGC-American Express Championship (4)	−10 (67-68-68-67=270)	Playoff	(United States) John Daly
26	Feb 5, 2006	Dubai Desert Classic	−19 (67-66-67-69=269)	Playoff	(South Africa) Ernie Els
27	Jul 23, 2006	The Open Championship (3)	−18 (67-65-71-67=270)	2 strokes	(United States) Chris DiMarco
28	Aug 20, 2006	PGA Championship (3)	−18 (69-68-65-68=270)	5 strokes	(United States) Shaun Micheel
29	Aug 27, 2006	WGC-Bridgestone Invitational (5)	−10 (67-64-71-68=270)	Playoff	(United States) Stewart Cink
30	Oct 1, 2006	WGC-American Express Championship (5)	−23 (63-64-67-67=261)	8 strokes	(England) Ian Poulter, (Australia) Adam Scott
31	Mar 25, 2007	WGC-CA Championship (6)	−10 (71-66-68-73=278)	2 strokes	(United States) Brett Wetterich
32	Aug 5, 2007	WGC-Bridgestone Invitational (6)	−8 (68-70-69-65=272)	8 strokes	(England) Justin Rose, (South Africa) Rory Sabbatini
33	Aug 12, 2007	PGA Championship (4)	−8 (71-63-69-69=272)	2 strokes	(United States) Woody Austin
34	Feb 3, 2008	Dubai Desert Classic (2)	−14 (65-71-73-65=274)	1 stroke	(Germany) Martin Kaymer
35	Feb 24, 2008	WGC-Accenture Match Play Championship (3)	8 and 7		(United States) Stewart Cink
36	Jun 16, 2008	U.S. Open (3)	−1 (72-68-70-73=283)	Playoff	(United States) Rocco Mediate
37	Aug 9, 2009	WGC-Bridgestone Invitational (7)	−12 (68-70-65-65=268)	4 strokes	(Australia) Robert Allenby, (Republic of Ireland) Pádraig Harrington
38	Nov 15, 2009	JBWere Masters^{1}	−14 (66-68-72-68=274)	2 strokes	(Australia) Greg Chalmers
39	Mar 10, 2013	WGC-Cadillac Championship (7)	−19 (66-65-67-71=269)	2 strokes	(United States) Steve Stricker
40	Aug 4, 2013	WGC-Bridgestone Invitational (8)	−15 (66-61-68-70=265)	7 strokes	(United States) Keegan Bradley, (Sweden) Henrik Stenson
41	Apr 14, 2019	Masters Tournament (5)	−13 (70-68-67-70=275)	1 stroke	(United States) Dustin Johnson, (United States) Brooks Koepka, (United States) Xander Schauffele

^{1}Co-sanctioned by the PGA Tour of Australasia
^{2}Co-sanctioned by the Asian PGA Tour

European Tour playoff record (10–0)

No.	Year	Tournament	Opponent	Result
1	1998	Johnnie Walker Classic	(South Africa) Ernie Els	Won with birdie on second extra hole
2	1999	WGC-American Express Championship	(Spain) Miguel Ángel Jiménez	Won with birdie on first extra hole
3	2000	PGA Championship	(United States) Bob May	Won three-hole aggregate playoff; Woods: −1 (3-4-5=12), May: E (4-4-5=13)
4	2001	WGC-NEC Invitational	(United States) Jim Furyk	Won with birdie on seventh extra hole
5	2002	Deutsche Bank - SAP Open TPC of Europe	(Scotland) Colin Montgomerie	Won with par on third extra hole
6	2005	Masters Tournament	(United States) Chris DiMarco	Won with birdie on first extra hole
7	2005	WGC-American Express Championship	(United States) John Daly	Won with par on second extra hole
8	2006	Dubai Desert Classic	(South Africa) Ernie Els	Won with par on first extra hole
9	2006	WGC-Bridgestone Invitational	(United States) Stewart Cink	Won with birdie on fourth extra hole
10	2008	U.S. Open	(United States) Rocco Mediate	Won with par on first extra hole after 18-hole playoff; Woods: E (71), Mediate: E (71)

=== Japan Golf Tour wins (3) ===
No.	Date	Tournament	Winning score	Margin of victory	Runner-up
1	Nov 21, 2004	Dunlop Phoenix Tournament	−16 (65-67-65-67=264)	8 strokes	(Japan) Ryoken Kawagishi
2	Nov 20, 2005	Dunlop Phoenix Tournament (2)	−8 (65-67-68-72=272)	Playoff	(Japan) Kaname Yokoo
3	Oct 28, 2019	Zozo Championship^{1}	−19 (64-64-66-67=261)	3 strokes	(Japan) Hideki Matsuyama

^{1}Co-sanctioned by the PGA Tour

Japan Golf Tour playoff record (1–1)

No.	Year	Tournament	Opponent	Result
1	2005	Dunlop Phoenix Tournament	(Japan) Kaname Yokoo	Won with birdie on fourth extra hole
2	2006	Dunlop Phoenix Tournament	(Republic of Ireland) Pádraig Harrington	Lost to birdie on second extra hole

=== Asian PGA Tour wins (2) ===
No.	Date	Tournament	Winning score	Margin of victory	Runner-up
1	Feb 9, 1997	Asian Honda Classic	−20 (70-64-66-68=268)	10 strokes	(South Korea) Mo Joong-kyung
2	Nov 19, 2000	Johnnie Walker Classic^{1}	−25 (68-65-65-65=263)	3 strokes	(Australia) Geoff Ogilvy

^{1}Co-sanctioned by the European Tour and the PGA Tour of Australasia

=== PGA Tour of Australasia wins (3) ===
No.	Date	Tournament	Winning score	Margin of victory	Runner-up
1	Jan 25, 1998	Johnnie Walker Classic^{1}	−9 (72-71-71-65=279)	Playoff	(South Africa) Ernie Els
2	Nov 19, 2000	Johnnie Walker Classic^{1,2} (2)	−25 (68-65-65-65=263)	3 strokes	(Australia) Geoff Ogilvy
3	Nov 15, 2009	JBWere Masters^{1}	−14 (66-68-72-68=274)	2 strokes	(Australia) Greg Chalmers

^{1}Co-sanctioned by the European Tour
^{2}Co-sanctioned by the Asian PGA Tour

PGA Tour of Australasia playoff record (1–0)

No.	Year	Tournament	Opponent	Result
1	1998	Johnnie Walker Classic	(South Africa) Ernie Els	Won with birdie on second extra hole

=== Other wins (17) ===
Legend
World Golf Championships (1)
Other wins (16)

No.	Date	Tournament	Winning score	Margin of victory	Runner(s)-up
1	Nov 19, 1998	PGA Grand Slam of Golf	2 up		(Fiji) Vijay Singh
2	Nov 21, 1999	World Cup of Golf (with (United States) Mark O'Meara)	−23 (140-133-130-142=545)	5 strokes	Spain − Santiago Luna and Miguel Ángel Martín
3	Nov 21, 1999	World Cup of Golf Individual Trophy	−21 (67-68-63-65=263)	9 strokes	(New Zealand) Frank Nobilo
4	Nov 24, 1999	PGA Grand Slam of Golf (2)	3 and 2		(United States) Davis Love III
5	Jul 11, 2000	J. P. McManus Pro-Am	−12 (64-68=132)	6 strokes	(England) Malcolm MacKenzie
6	Dec 10, 2000	WGC-World Cup (2) (with (United States) David Duval)	−34 (61-65-60-68=254)	3 strokes	Argentina − Ángel Cabrera and Eduardo Romero
7	Nov 22, 2000	PGA Grand Slam of Golf (3)	−5 (71-68=139)	Playoff	(Fiji) Vijay Singh
8	Nov 21, 2001	PGA Grand Slam of Golf (4)	−12 (67-65=132)	3 strokes	(United States) David Toms
9	Dec 16, 2001	Williams World Challenge	−15 (68-67-74-64=273)	3 strokes	(Fiji) Vijay Singh
10	Nov 27, 2002	PGA Grand Slam of Golf (5)	−17 (66-61=127)	14 strokes	(United States) Justin Leonard, (United States) Davis Love III
11	Dec 12, 2004	Target World Challenge (2)	−16 (67-66-69-66=268)	2 strokes	(Republic of Ireland) Pádraig Harrington
12	Nov 23, 2005	PGA Grand Slam of Golf (6)	−13 (67-64=131)	7 strokes	(United States) Phil Mickelson
13	Nov 22, 2006	PGA Grand Slam of Golf (7)	−8 (70-66=136)	2 strokes	(United States) Jim Furyk
14	Dec 17, 2006	Target World Challenge (3)	−16 (68-68-70-66=272)	4 strokes	(Australia) Geoff Ogilvy
15	Dec 16, 2007	Target World Challenge (4)	−22 (69-62-67-68=266)	7 strokes	(United States) Zach Johnson
16	Aug 24, 2009	Notah Begay III Foundation Challenge	$230,000	$30,000	(Colombia) Camilo Villegas
17	Dec 4, 2011	Chevron World Challenge (5)	−10 (69-67-73-69=278)	1 stroke	(United States) Zach Johnson

Other playoff record (1–5)

No.	Year	Tournament	Opponent(s)	Result
1	1998	Nedbank Million Dollar Challenge	(Zimbabwe) Nick Price	Lost to birdie on fifth extra hole
2	2000	PGA Grand Slam of Golf	(Fiji) Vijay Singh	Won with eagle on first extra hole
3	2001	WGC-World Cup (with (United States) David Duval)	Denmark − Thomas Bjørn and Søren Hansen, New Zealand − Michael Campbell and David Smail, South Africa − Retief Goosen and Ernie Els	South Africa won with par on second extra hole New Zealand and United States eliminated by birdie on first hole
4	2010	Chevron World Challenge	(Northern Ireland) Graeme McDowell	Lost to birdie on first extra hole
5	2013	Northwestern Mutual World Challenge	(United States) Zach Johnson	Lost to par on first extra hole
6	2024	PNC Championship (with son Charlie Woods)	(Germany) Bernhard Langer and son Jason Langer	Lost to eagle on first extra hole

== Amateur wins (21) ==
- 1984 (1) Junior World Golf Championships (Boys 10-and-under)
- 1985 (1) Junior World Golf Championships (Boys 10-and-under)
- 1988 (1) Junior World Golf Championships (Boys 11–12)
- 1989 (1) Junior World Golf Championships (Boys 13–14)
- 1990 (2) Junior World Golf Championships (Boys 13–14), Insurance Youth Golf Classic
- 1991 (3) U.S. Junior Amateur, Junior World Golf Championships (Boys 15–17), Orange Bowl International Junior
- 1992 (2) U.S. Junior Amateur, Insurance Youth Golf Classic
- 1993 (1) U.S. Junior Amateur
- 1994 (3) U.S. Amateur, Western Amateur, Pacific Northwest Amateur
- 1995 (2) U.S. Amateur, College All-America Golf Classic
- 1996 (4) U.S. Amateur, NCAA Division I Championship, NCAA West Regional, Pac-10 Championship

=== Amateur major wins (3) ===
Year	Championship	Winning score	Runner-up
1994	U.S. Amateur	2 up	(United States) Trip Kuehne
1995	U.S. Amateur	2 up	(United States) Buddy Marucci
1996	U.S. Amateur	38 holes	(United States) Steve Scott

=== Results timeline ===
Tournament	1991	1992	1993	1994	1995	1996
U.S. Amateur	DNQ	R32	R32	1	1	1 M

M = Medalist
DNQ = Did not qualify for match play portion
R32, R16, QF, SF = Round in which player lost in match play
Green background for wins. Yellow background for top-10

== Reign as World No. 1 male golfer ==
Woods holds the record for most consecutive weeks at No. 1, 281, and the most total number of weeks, 683. Since 1997, he has spent over twelve years atop the Official World Golf Ranking, and has been the number one player for all 52 weeks of a year a record eight times – 2000, 2001, 2002, 2003, 2006, 2007, 2008 and 2009. He has spent 906 weeks ranked in the top-10, and overtook Ernie Els as the golfer with the most weeks ranked in the top 10 in 2013.

This list is complete as of 2024.

Start date	End date	Weeks	Approximate time	Successor
June 15, 1997	June 21, 1997	1	7 days	(South Africa) Ernie Els
July 6, 1997	September 6, 1997	9	2 months	(Australia) Greg Norman
January 11, 1998	April 11, 1998	13	3 months	(South Africa) Ernie Els
May 10, 1998	May 16, 1998	1	7 days	(South Africa) Ernie Els
June 14, 1998	March 27, 1999	41	9 months, 13 days	(United States) David Duval
July 4, 1999	August 7, 1999	5	1 month, 3 days	(United States) David Duval
August 15, 1999	September 4, 2004	264	5 years, 20 days	(Fiji) Vijay Singh
March 6, 2005	March 19, 2005	2	14 days	(Fiji) Vijay Singh
April 10, 2005	May 21, 2005	6	1 month, 11 days	(Fiji) Vijay Singh
June 12, 2005	October 30, 2010	281	5 years, 4.5 months	(England) Lee Westwood
March 25, 2013	May 17, 2014	60	1 year, 2 months	(Australia) Adam Scott

== U.S. national team appearances ==
Amateur

- Eisenhower Trophy: 1994 (winners)
- Walker Cup: 1995

Professional

- Ryder Cup: 1997, 1999 (winners), 2002, 2004, 2006, 2010, 2012, 2018
  - Ryder Cup record (W–L–H): 13–21–3
- Alfred Dunhill Cup: 1998
- Presidents Cup: 1998, 2000 (winners), 2003 (tie), 2005 (winners), 2007 (winners), 2009 (winners), 2011 (winners), 2013 (winners), 2019 (playing captain, winners)
  - Presidents Cup record (W–L–H): 27–15–1
- World Cup: 1999 (winners, individual winner), 2000 (winners), 2001

Ryder Cup points record
1997	1999	2002	2004	2006	2008	2010	2012	2014	2016	2018	Total
1.5	2	2.5	2	3	–	3	0.5	–	–	0	14.5

Presidents Cup points record
1998	2000	2003	2005	2007	2009	2011	2013	2015	2017	2019	Total
2	3	3	2.5	3	5	2	4	–	–	3	27.5

== Awards ==
1990

- 1st Team – Rolex Junior All-American
- Southern California Player of the Year

1991

- 1st Team – Rolex Junior All-American (2)
- American Junior Golf Association Player of the Year
- Golf Digest Amateur Player of the Year
- GolfWeek National Amateur of the Year
- Southern California Player of the Year (2)

1992

- 1st Team – Rolex Junior All-American (3)
- American Junior Golf Association Player of the Year (2)
- Golf Digest Amateur Player of the Year (2)
- GolfWeek National Amateur of the Year (2)
- Southern California Player of the Year (3)
- Golf World Player of the Year

1993

- 1st Team – Rolex Junior All-American (4)
- Southern California Player of the Year (4)
- Golf World Player of the Year (2)

1994

- Golf World Man of the Year
- L.A. Times Player of the Year
- Orange County Player of the Year

1995

- Pac-10 Player of the Year
- NCAA First Team All-American
- GolfWeek Preseason First Team All-American for 1995–96
- Stanford University's Male Freshman of the Year

1996

- PGA Tour Rookie of the Year
- Sports Illustrated "Sportsman of the Year"
- Stanford University Collegiate Player of the Year
- Fred Haskins Award
- Jack Nicklaus Award

1997

- Jack Nicklaus Trophy
- PGA Player of the Year
- PGA Tour Money Leader
- ABC's Wide World of Sports Athlete of the Year
- Golf Writers Association of America Player of the Year
- Associated Press Male Athlete of the Year

1998

- Mark H. McCormack Award
- ESPN's ESPY Award for Best Male Athlete (for 1997)

1999

- PGA Tour Player of the Year (2)
- PGA Player of the Year (2)
- PGA Tour Money Leader (2)
- Vardon Trophy
- Byron Nelson Award
- Mark H. McCormack Award (2)
- Golf Writers Association of America Player of the Year (2)
- Anderson Consulting Medal for best performance in WGC events
- Associated Press Male Athlete of the Year (2)

2000

- PGA Tour Player of the Year (3)
- PGA Player of the Year (3)
- PGA Tour Money Leader (3)
- Vardon Trophy (2)
- Byron Nelson Award (2)
- Mark H. McCormack Award (3)
- Laureus World Sports Awards – Sportsman of the Year
- Sports Illustrated "Sportsman of the Year" (2)
- ABC's Wide World of Sports Athlete of the Year (2)
- Golf Writers Association of America Player of the Year (3)
- Royal Canadian Golf Association Triple Crown Trophy
- Palm Performance Award as leading money winner on PGA Tour West Coast Swing
- PricewaterhouseCoopers Fall Finish Award as leading money winner on PGA Tour's fall schedule
- Anderson Consulting Medal for best performance in WGC events (2)
- Associated Press Male Athlete of the Year (3)
- BBC Sports Personality of the Year Overseas Personality
- ESPN's ESPY Award for Best Male Athlete (for 1999) (2)

2001

- PGA Tour Player of the Year (4)
- PGA Player of the Year (4)
- PGA Tour Money Leader (4)
- Vardon Trophy (3)
- Byron Nelson Award (3)
- Mark H. McCormack Award (4)
- Laureus World Sports Awards – Sportsman of the Year (2)
- ESPN's ESPY Award for Best Male Athlete (for 2000) (3)
- Golf Writers Association of America Player of the Year (4)

2002

- PGA Tour Player of the Year (5)
- PGA Player of the Year (5)
- PGA Tour Money Leader (5)
- Vardon Trophy (4)
- Byron Nelson Award (4)
- Mark H. McCormack Award (5)
- ESPN's ESPY Award for Best Male Athlete (for 2001) (4)
- Golf Writers Association of America Player of the Year (5)

2003

- PGA Tour Player of the Year (6)
- PGA Player of the Year (6)
- Vardon Trophy (5)
- Byron Nelson Award (5)
- Mark H. McCormack Award (6)
- Golf Writers Association of America Player of the Year (6)

2004

- Mark H. McCormack Award (7)

2005

- PGA Tour Player of the Year (7)
- PGA Player of the Year (7)
- PGA Tour Money Leader (6)
- Vardon Trophy (6)
- Byron Nelson Award (6)
- Mark H. McCormack Award (8)
- Golf Writers Association of America Player of the Year (7)

2006

- PGA Tour Player of the Year (8)
- PGA Player of the Year (8)
- PGA Tour Money Leader (7)
- Byron Nelson Award (7)
- Mark H. McCormack Award (9)
- Associated Press Male Athlete of the Year (4)
- Golf Writers Association of America Player of the Year (8)

2007

- PGA Tour Player of the Year (9)
- PGA Player of the Year (9)
- PGA Tour Money Leader (8)
- Vardon Trophy (7)
- Byron Nelson Award (8)
- Mark H. McCormack Award (10)
- FedEx Cup
- Golf Writers Association of America Player of the Year (9)

2008

- Mark H. McCormack Award (11)

2009

- PGA Tour Player of the Year (10)
- PGA Player of the Year (10)
- PGA Tour Money Leader (9)
- Vardon Trophy (8)
- Byron Nelson Award (9)
- Mark H. McCormack Award (12)
- FedEx Cup (2)
- Golf Writers Association of America Player of the Year (10)
- Associated Press Athlete of the Decade

2010

- Mark H. McCormack Award (13)

2013

- PGA Tour Player of the Year (11)
- PGA Player of the Year (11)
- PGA Tour Money Leader (10)
- Vardon Trophy (9)
- Mark H. McCormack Award (14)

2019

- Golf Writers Association of America Ben Hogan Award
- Presidential Medal of Freedom
- Teen Choice Award
- Laureus World Sports Awards – Comeback of the Year

2023

- Orange County Hall of Fame
