= 2007 WGC-CA Championship =

Coordinates: 25°49′10″N 80°20′34″W

Tournament information
- Dates: March 22–25, 2007
- Location: Doral, Florida, U.S.
- Course: Doral Golf Resort & Spa
- Tour(s): PGA Tour; European Tour

Statistics
- Par: 72
- Length: 7,266
- Field: 73 players
- Cut: None
- Prize fund: $8,000,000
- Winner's share: $1,350,000

Champion
- (United States) Tiger Woods
- 278 (−10)

The 2007 WGC-CA Championship was a golf tournament that was contested from March 22–25 over the Blue Monster Course at Doral Golf Resort & Spa in Doral, Florida. It was the eighth WGC-CA Championship tournament, and the second of three World Golf Championships events held in 2007. It was the first tournament under the sponsorship of CA, Inc. and took the place of the Ford Championship at Doral on the PGA Tour schedule, the 46th PGA Tour event at Doral.

World number 1 Tiger Woods was the two-time defending champion and won the tournament to capture his third consecutive and sixth overall WGC-CA Championship and his 13th World Golf Championships title. This was the second time Woods captured three consecutive titles at the same WCG event (he also won NEC Invitational from 1999−2001). Later in 2007, Woods would win a third consecutive WGC-Bridgestone Invitational title (formerly known as the NEC Invitational). Geoff Ogilvy and Dustin Johnson are the only other players in WGC history to win at least three WGC titles.

== Field ==
1. Top 50 players from the Official World Golf Rankings two weeks prior to event
Robert Allenby (2), Stephen Ames (2,3), Stuart Appleby (2,3), Aaron Baddeley (2,4,5), Bart Bryant (2), Ángel Cabrera (2,6), Chad Campbell (2,3), Michael Campbell (2,7,8), Paul Casey (2,6,7,8), K. J. Choi (2,3), Stewart Cink (2,3), Tim Clark (2), Chris DiMarco (2), Luke Donald (2,3,6), Joe Durant (2,3), Ernie Els (2,3,6,7,8), Niclas Fasth (2,6), Jim Furyk (2,3), Sergio García (2,6), Lucas Glover (2,3), Retief Goosen (2,3,6,7,8), Paul Goydos (2,4,5), Pádraig Harrington (2,6), Charles Howell III (2,4,5), David Howell (2,6), Trevor Immelman (2,3,7,8), Robert Karlsson (2,6), Shingo Katayama (2,10), Davis Love III (2,3), Phil Mickelson (2,3,4,5), Colin Montgomerie (2,6), Arron Oberholser (2,3), Geoff Ogilvy (2,3), Nick O'Hern (2,7,8,11), José María Olazábal (2), Rod Pampling (2,3), Carl Pettersson (2,3), Ian Poulter (2,6), Rory Sabbatini (2,3), Adam Scott (2,3), Jeev Milkha Singh (2,6,9,10), Vijay Singh (2,3,4,5), Henrik Stenson (2,5,6,7,8), Steve Stricker (2), David Toms (2,3), Mike Weir (2), Brett Wetterich (2,3), Tiger Woods (2,3,4,5), Yang Yong-eun (2,7,8)

- Justin Rose (2,7,8) did not play.

2. Top 50 players from the Official World Golf Rankings one week prior to event

3. Top 30 from the final 2006 PGA Tour money list
Ben Curtis, J. J. Henry, Zach Johnson, Tom Pernice Jr., Brett Quigley, Dean Wilson

4. Top 10 from the PGA Tour FedEx Cup points list two weeks prior to event
Mark Calcavecchia (5), Charley Hoffman, John Rollins (5), Mark Wilson (5)

5. Top 10 from the PGA Tour FedEx Cup points list one week prior to event

6. Top 20 from the final 2006 European Tour Order of Merit
John Bickerton, Thomas Bjørn, Paul Broadhurst, Johan Edfors, Charl Schwartzel (12), Anthony Wall

7. Top 10 from the European Tour Order of Merit two weeks prior to event
Anton Haig (8)

8. Top 10 from the European Tour Order of Merit one week prior to event

9. Top 3 from the final 2006 Asian Tour Order of Merit
Thongchai Jaidee, Prom Meesawat

10. Top 3 from the final 2006 Japan Golf Tour Order of Merit
Hideto Tanihara

11. Top 3 from the final 2006 PGA Tour of Australasia Order of Merit
Nathan Green, Kevin Stadler

12. Top 3 from the final 2006-07 Sunshine Tour Order of Merit
Louis Oosthuizen, Hennie Otto

== Round summaries ==
=== First round ===
Place	Player	Score	To par
T1	(Australia) Robert Allenby	67	−5
T1	(Sweden) Henrik Stenson	67	−5
3	(Denmark) Thomas Bjørn	68	−4
T4	(Australia) Aaron Baddeley	69	−3
T4	(United States) Charles Howell III	69	−3
T4	(Spain) José María Olazábal	69	−3
T7	(South Africa) Ernie Els	70	−2
T7	(United States) Jim Furyk	70	−2
T7	(Australia) Rod Pampling	70	−2
T10	(United States) Bart Bryant	71	−1
T10	(South Korea) K. J. Choi	71	−1
T10	(Spain) Sergio García	71	−1
T10	(United States) Tom Pernice Jr.	71	−1
T10	(South Africa) Rory Sabbatini	71	−1
T10	(United States) Tiger Woods	71	−1

=== Second round ===
Place	Player	Score	To par
1	(United States) Tiger Woods	71-66=137	−7
2	(Australia) Rod Pampling	70-69=139	−5
T3	(Australia) Aaron Baddeley	69-71=140	−4
T3	(Denmark) Thomas Bjørn	68-72=140	−4
T3	(South Africa) Ernie Els	70-70=140	−4
T3	(United States) Charles Howell III	69-71=140	−4
T3	(South Africa) Trevor Immelman	72-68=140	−4
T3	(United States) Zach Johnson	72-68=140	−4
T3	(Sweden) Henrik Stenson	67-73=140	−4
T10	(Australia) Robert Allenby	67-74=141	−3
T10	(Spain) Sergio García	71-70=141	−3
T10	(Australia) Geoff Ogilvy	72-69=141	−3
T10	(United States) Tom Pernice Jr.	71-70=141	−3
T10	(England) Ian Poulter	73-68=141	−3

=== Third round ===
Place	Player	Score	To par
1	(United States) Tiger Woods	71-66-68=205	−11
2	(United States) Brett Wetterich	72-70-67=209	−7
3	(Australia) Nick O'Hern	72-72-66=210	−6
T4	(Australia) Aaron Baddeley	69-71-71=211	−5
T4	(Denmark) Thomas Bjørn	68-72-71=211	−5
T4	(South Africa) Ernie Els	70-70-71=211	−5
T4	(United States) Charles Howell III	69-71-71=211	−5
T4	(United States) Tom Pernice Jr.	71-70-70=211	−5
T4	(Fiji) Vijay Singh	74-68-69=211	−5
T10	(England) Paul Casey	76-70-66=212	−4
T10	(Sweden) Niclas Fasth	72-70-70=212	−4
T10	(Spain) Sergio García	71-70-71=212	−4
T10	(Australia) Geoff Ogilvy	72-69-71=212	−4
T10	(Sweden) Henrik Stenson	67-73-72=212	−4

=== Final round ===
Place	Player	Score	To par	Winnings ($)
1	(United States) Tiger Woods	71-66-68-73=278	−10	1,350,000
2	(United States) Brett Wetterich	72-70-67-71=280	−8	800,000
T3	(Australia) Robert Allenby	67-74-74-67=282	−6	378,333
T3	(Spain) Sergio García	71-70-71-70=282	−6	378,333
T3	(Australia) Geoff Ogilvy	72-69-71-70=282	−6	378,333
T6	(Australia) Aaron Baddeley	69-71-71-72=283	−5	212,500
T6	(Sweden) Niclas Fasth	72-70-70-71=283	−5	212,500
T6	(Australia) Nick O'Hern	72-72-66-73=283	−5	212,500
T9	(England) Paul Casey	76-70-66-72=284	−4	157,500
T9	(United States) Zach Johnson	72-68-73-71=284	−4	157,500

==== Scorecard ====
Hole	1	2	3	4	5	6	7	8	9	10	11	12	13	14	15	16	17	18
Par	5	4	4	3	4	4	4	5	3	5	4	5	3	4	3	4	4	4
(United States) Woods	−12	−12	−11	−11	−12	−11	−11	−11	−12	−13	−12	−12	−11	−11	−11	−11	−11	−10
(United States) Wetterich	−6	−6	−6	−7	−7	−7	−7	−7	−7	−7	−7	−6	−6	−7	−7	−8	−8	−8
(Australia) Allenby	−2	−3	−3	−4	−4	−4	−4	−5	−5	−5	−5	−6	−6	−7	−7	−7	−6	−6
(Spain) García	−5	−5	−4	−4	−4	−3	−3	−4	−4	−4	−4	−5	−5	−5	−6	−6	−6	−6
(Australia) Ogilvy	−4	−4	−3	−3	−4	−3	−3	−4	−3	−4	−5	−5	−5	−5	−5	−6	−6	−6

Cumulative tournament scores, relative to par

Birdie	Bogey
