= 2006 WGC-American Express Championship =

Golf tournament at The Grove Golf Course in Hertfordshire, England

Tournament information
- Dates: 28 September – 1 October 2006
- Location: Hertfordshire, England
- Course(s): The Grove Golf Course
- Tour(s): PGA Tour; European Tour

Statistics
- Par: 71
- Length: 7,125
- Field: 62 players
- Cut: None
- Prize fund: $7,500,000
- Winner's share: $1,300,000

Champion
- (United States) Tiger Woods
- 261 (−23)

The 2006 WGC-American Express Championship was a golf tournament that was contested from 28 September – 1 October 2006 at The Grove Golf Course in Hertfordshire, England. It was the seventh WGC-American Express Championship tournament, and the third of three World Golf Championships events held in 2006.

World number 1 Tiger Woods won the tournament with a record aggregate score of 261, to capture his fifth WGC-American Express Championship and his twelfth World Golf Championships title.

== Round summaries ==
=== First round ===
| Place | Player | Score | To par |
|---|---|---|---|
| 1 | (United States) Tiger Woods | 63 | −8 |
| T2 | (Republic of Ireland) Pádraig Harrington | 64 | −7 |
| T2 | (England) Ian Poulter | 64 | −7 |
| T4 | (United States) Stewart Cink | 65 | −6 |
| T4 | (South Africa) Ernie Els | 65 | −6 |
| T6 | (England) David Howell | 66 | −5 |
| T6 | (India) Jyoti Randhawa | 66 | −5 |
| T8 | (United States) Chad Campbell | 67 | −4 |
| T8 | (England) Simon Dyson | 67 | −4 |
| T8 | (United States) Jim Furyk | 67 | −4 |
| T8 | (Sweden) Robert Karlsson | 67 | −4 |
| T8 | (Australia) Nick O'Hern | 67 | −4 |
| T8 | (Australia) Adam Scott | 67 | −4 |

=== Second round ===
| Place | Player | Score | To par |
|---|---|---|---|
| 1 | (United States) Tiger Woods | 63-64=127 | −15 |
| T2 | (United States) Stewart Cink | 65-67=132 | −10 |
| T2 | (United States) Jim Furyk | 67-65=132 | −10 |
| T2 | (England) David Howell | 66-66=132 | −10 |
| 5 | (Republic of Ireland) Pádraig Harrington | 64-69=133 | −9 |
| 6 | (United States) Brett Quigley | 70-64=134 | −8 |
| T7 | (South Africa) Ernie Els | 65-70=135 | −7 |
| T7 | (England) Ian Poulter | 64-71=135 | −7 |
| T7 | (Australia) Adam Scott | 67-68=135 | −7 |
| T7 | (Sweden) Henrik Stenson | 68-67=135 | −7 |

=== Third round ===
| Place | Player | Score | To par |
|---|---|---|---|
| 1 | (United States) Tiger Woods | 63-64-67=194 | −19 |
| 2 | (Australia) Adam Scott | 67-68-65=200 | −13 |
| T3 | (United States) Jim Furyk | 67-65-69=201 | −12 |
| T3 | (United States) Brett Quigley | 70-64-67=201 | −12 |
| 5 | (United States) Stewart Cink | 65-67-70=202 | −11 |
| T6 | (England) David Howell | 66-66-71=203 | −10 |
| T6 | (England) Ian Poulter | 64-71-68=203 | −10 |
| T6 | (Sweden) Henrik Stenson | 68-67-68=203 | −10 |
| T9 | (South Africa) Ernie Els | 65-70-69=204 | −9 |
| T9 | (Republic of Ireland) Pádraig Harrington | 64-69-71=204 | −9 |
| T9 | (South Africa) Trevor Immelman | 68-68-68=204 | −9 |

== Final leaderboard ==
| Place | Player | Score | To par | Winnings ($) |
|---|---|---|---|---|
| 1 | (United States) Tiger Woods | 63-64-67-67=261 | −23 | 1,300,000 |
| T2 | (England) Ian Poulter | 64-71-68-66=269 | −15 | 610,000 |
| T2 | (Australia) Adam Scott | 67-68-65-69=269 | −15 | 610,000 |
| 4 | (United States) Jim Furyk | 67-65-69-69=270 | −14 | 345,000 |
| 5 | (South Africa) Ernie Els | 65-70-69-67=271 | −13 | 290,000 |
| T6 | (Australia) Stuart Appleby | 71-66-70-66=273 | −11 | 216,667 |
| T6 | (England) Luke Donald | 68-70-67-68=273 | −11 | 216,667 |
| T6 | (United States) Brett Wetterich | 70-66-69-68=273 | −11 | 216,667 |
| T9 | (South Africa) Trevor Immelman | 68-68-68-70=274 | −10 | 150,000 |
| T9 | (United States) Brett Quigley | 70-64-67-73=274 | −10 | 150,000 |
| T9 | (Thailand) Thongchai Jaidee | 71-67-71-65=274 | −10 | 150,000 |
