= 2001 WGC-NEC Invitational =

Coordinates: 41.008°N 81.508°W

Tournament information
- Dates: August 23–26, 2001
- Location: Akron, Ohio, U.S.
- Course(s): Firestone Country Club
- Tour(s): PGA Tour; European Tour

Statistics
- Par: 70
- Length: 7,139
- Field: 39 players
- Cut: None
- Prize fund: $5,000,000
- Winner's share: $1,000,000

Champion
- (United States) Tiger Woods
- 268 (−12), playoff

The 2001 WGC-NEC Invitational was a golf tournament that was contested from August 23–26, 2001 over the South Course at Firestone Country Club in Akron, Ohio. It was the third WGC-NEC Invitational tournament, and the second of three World Golf Championships events held in 2001.

World number 1 Tiger Woods won the tournament to complete a hat-trick of victories at the WGC-NEC Invitational and claim his fourth World Golf Championships title. Woods defeated Jim Furyk on the 7th hole of a sudden-death playoff after both men had tied at 268 (12 under par) at the end of regulation play.

== Field ==
1. 2001 United States Ryder Cup team*

Paul Azinger (3), Mark Calcavecchia, Stewart Cink (3), David Duval (3), Jim Furyk (3), Scott Hoch, Davis Love III (3), Phil Mickelson (3), Hal Sutton (3), David Toms, Scott Verplank, Tiger Woods (3)

2. The leading 12 players from the European Ryder Cup points list after the PGA Championship and North West of Ireland Open

Thomas Bjørn, Darren Clarke, Niclas Fasth, Pierre Fulke, Pádraig Harrington, Miguel Ángel Jiménez, Bernhard Langer, Paul McGinley, Colin Montgomerie, Ian Poulter, Phillip Price, Lee Westwood

3. 2000 United States and International Presidents Cup teams

- United States: Notah Begay III, Loren Roberts, Kirk Triplett

- Tom Lehman did not play.

- International: Robert Allenby, Stuart Appleby, Michael Campbell, Steve Elkington, Ernie Els, Carlos Franco, Retief Goosen, Shigeki Maruyama, Greg Norman, Nick Price, Vijay Singh, Mike Weir

*The Ryder Cup scheduled for 2001 would be postponed to 2002 due to the September 11 attacks.

== Round summaries ==
=== First round ===
Place	Player	Score	To par
T1	(United States) Jim Furyk	65	−5
T1	(Australia) Greg Norman	65	−5
T3	(Denmark) Thomas Bjørn	66	−4
T3	(Northern Ireland) Darren Clarke	66	−4
T3	(Scotland) Colin Montgomerie	66	−4
T3	(United States) Tiger Woods	66	−4
T7	(United States) Paul Azinger	67	−3
T7	(South Africa) Ernie Els	67	−3
T7	(United States) Phil Mickelson	67	−3
T7	(England) Ian Poulter	67	−3

=== Second round ===
Place	Player	Score	To par
1	(United States) Jim Furyk	65-66=131	−9
T2	(United States) Phil Mickelson	67-66=133	−7
T2	(United States) Tiger Woods	66-67=133	−7
T4	(Australia) Stuart Appleby	70-64=134	−6
T4	(Northern Ireland) Darren Clarke	66-68=134	−6
T4	(Republic of Ireland) Pádraig Harrington	68-66=134	−6
7	(Australia) Robert Allenby	68-67=135	−5
T8	(United States) Stewart Cink	69-67=136	−4
T8	(Germany) Bernhard Langer	69-67=136	−4
T8	(United States) Davis Love III	68-68=136	−4
T8	(Australia) Greg Norman	65-71=136	−4
T8	(Fiji) Vijay Singh	68-68=136	−4

=== Third round ===
Place	Player	Score	To par
1	(United States) Jim Furyk	65-66-66=197	−13
2	(United States) Tiger Woods	66-67-66=199	−11
T3	(United States) Paul Azinger	67-70-65=202	−8
T3	(Northern Ireland) Darren Clarke	66-68-68=202	−8
T5	(South Africa) Ernie Els	67-70-66=203	−7
T5	(United States) Phil Mickelson	67-66-70=203	−7
T5	(Scotland) Colin Montgomerie	66-71-66=203	−7
T8	(Australia) Stuart Appleby	70-64-70=204	−6
T8	(Germany) Bernhard Langer	69-67-68=204	−6
T10	(South Africa) Retief Goosen	72-69-64=205	−5
T10	(Fiji) Vijay Singh	68-68-69=205	−5

=== Final round ===
Place	Player	Score	To par	Winnings ($)
T1	(United States) Tiger Woods	66-67-66-69=268	−12	1,000,000
T1	(United States) Jim Furyk	65-66-66-71=268	−12	500,000
3	(Northern Ireland) Darren Clarke	66-68-68-69=271	−9	375,000
4	(Scotland) Colin Montgomerie	66-71-66-70=273	−7	300,000
T5	(Australia) Stuart Appleby	70-64-70-70=274	−6	201,667
T5	(United States) Paul Azinger	67-70-65-72=274	−6	201,667
T5	(United States) Davis Love III	68-68-70-68=274	−6	201,667
T8	(South Africa) Ernie Els	67-70-66-72=275	−5	147,500
T8	(United States) Phil Mickelson	67-66-70-72=275	−5	147,500
10	(South Africa) Retief Goosen	72-69-64-71=276	−4	131,000

==== Scorecard ====
Hole	1	2	3	4	5	6	7	8	9	10	11	12	13	14	15	16	17	18
Par	4	5	4	4	3	4	3	4	4	4	4	3	4	4	3	5	4	4
(United States) Woods	−11	−12	−13	−13	−13	−12	−12	−12	−12	−12	−12	−12	−13	−13	−12	−13	−13	−12
(United States) Furyk	−13	−14	−14	−14	−14	−13	−13	−13	−13	−13	−13	−13	−12	−12	−13	−13	−13	−12
(Northern Ireland) Clarke	−8	−9	−10	−9	−9	−8	−7	−7	−7	−8	−8	−8	−9	−9	−9	−9	−9	−9
(Scotland) Montgomerie	−7	−6	−7	−7	−7	−7	−7	−7	−6	−6	−6	−6	−7	−7	−7	−7	−7	−7
(Australia) Appleby	−6	−7	−8	−8	−8	−8	−9	−9	−8	−8	−8	−8	−8	−8	−7	−7	−6	−6
(United States) Azinger	−9	−10	−10	−10	−10	−9	−8	−7	−7	−7	−7	−7	−6	−6	−6	−6	−6	−6
(United States) Love	−5	−6	−6	−6	−6	−5	−5	−5	−5	−5	−5	−4	−4	−5	−6	−6	−6	−6

Cumulative tournament scores, relative to par

Birdie	Bogey

==== Sudden-death playoff ====
Player	Score							
Player	18	17	18	17	18	17	18	Total
Tiger Woods	4	4	4	4	4	4	3	27
Jim Furyk	4	4	4	4	4	4	5	29
