= 2005 WGC-American Express Championship =

Coordinates: 37.725°N 122.493°W

Tournament information
- Dates: October 6–9, 2005
- Location: San Francisco, California
- Course(s): Harding Park Golf Course
- Tour(s): PGA Tour; European Tour

Statistics
- Par: 70
- Length: 7,086 yards (6,479 m)
- Field: 71 players
- Cut: None
- Prize fund: $7,500,000 €6,144,040
- Winner's share: $1,300,000 €1,078,120

Champion
- (United States) Tiger Woods
- 270 (−10), playoff

Location in the United States

The 2005 WGC-American Express Championship was a professional golf tournament held October 6–9 at Harding Park Golf Course in San Francisco, California. It was the sixth WGC-American Express Championship tournament, and the third of three World Golf Championships events held in 2005.

World number 1 Tiger Woods won the tournament to capture his fourth WGC-American Express Championship and his tenth World Golf Championships title. Woods defeated John Daly on the second hole of a playoff when Daly missed a two-foot (0.6 m) putt for par.

== Round summaries ==
=== First round ===
Thursday, October 6, 2005

Place	Player	Score	To par
1	(Scotland) Colin Montgomerie	64	−6
T2	(United States) Olin Browne	67	−3
T2	(United States) Mark Calcavecchia	67	−3
T2	(United States) Chad Campbell	67	−3
T2	(United States) John Daly	67	−3
T2	(United States) Fred Funk	67	−3
T2	(Spain) Sergio García	67	−3
T2	(England) David Howell	67	−3
T2	(Australia) Rod Pampling	67	−3
T2	(England) Ian Poulter	67	−3
T2	(Fiji) Vijay Singh	67	−3
T2	(United States) Tiger Woods	67	−3

=== Second round ===
Friday, October 7, 2005

Place	Player	Score	To par
1	(Scotland) Colin Montgomerie	64-69=133	−7
T2	(United States) John Daly	67-67=134	−6
T2	(England) David Howell	67-67=134	−6
T4	(Argentina) Ángel Cabrera	69-66=135	−5
T4	(United States) Mark Calcavecchia	67-68=135	−5
T4	(United States) Fred Funk	67-68=135	−5
T4	(United States) Jim Furyk	68-67=135	−5
T4	(United States) Sean O'Hair	68-67=135	−5
T4	(United States) Tiger Woods	67-68=135	−5
T10	(Canada) Stephen Ames	72-64=136	−4
T10	(Australia) Stuart Appleby	71-65=136	−4
T10	(Spain) Sergio García	67-69=136	−4
T10	(United States) Billy Mayfair	69-67=136	−4
T10	(United States) David Toms	68-68=136	−4

=== Third round ===
Saturday, October 8, 2005

Place	Player	Score	To par
1	(United States) John Daly	67-67-67=201	−9
2	(Scotland) Colin Montgomerie	64-69-69=202	−8
T3	(Spain) Sergio García	67-69-67=203	−7
T3	(United States) Tiger Woods	67-68-68=203	−7
5	(Sweden) Henrik Stenson	70-67-67=204	−6
6	(Australia) Stuart Appleby	71-65-69=205	−5
T7	(United States) Jim Furyk	68-67-71=206	−4
T7	(United States) Sean O'Hair	68-67-71=206	−4
T7	(Fiji) Vijay Singh	67-70-69=206	−4
T7	(United States) David Toms	68-68-70=206	−4

=== Final round ===
Sunday, October 9, 2005

Place	Player	Score	To par	Money ($)
T1	(United States) Tiger Woods	67-68-68-67=270	−10	Playoff
T1	(United States) John Daly	67-67-67-69=270	−10	Playoff
T3	(Spain) Sergio García	67-69-67-69=272	−8	353,667
T3	(Scotland) Colin Montgomerie	64-69-69-70=272	−8	353,667
T3	(Sweden) Henrik Stenson	70-67-67-68=272	−8	353,667
T6	(England) David Howell	67-67-74-67=275	−5	187,500
T6	(Northern Ireland) Graeme McDowell	69-70-68-68=275	−5	187,500
T6	(Fiji) Vijay Singh	67-70-69-69=275	−5	187,500
T6	(United States) David Toms	68-68-70-69=275	−5	187,500
10	(Canada) Stephen Ames	72-64-71-69=276	−4	140,000

==== Scorecard ====
Hole	1	2	3	4	5	6	7	8	9	10	11	12	13	14	15	16	17	18
Par	4	4	3	5	4	4	4	3	4	5	3	4	4	4	4	4	3	4
(United States) Woods	−8	−7	−7	−7	−7	−7	−8	−7	−7	−8	−9	−10	−10	−9	−9	−10	−10	−10
(United States) Daly	−9	−9	−9	−10	−10	−9	−9	−10	−10	−10	−10	−10	−11	−11	−11	−11	−10	−10
(Spain) García	−7	−8	−8	−8	−8	−7	−9	−8	−7	−8	−8	−8	−8	−8	−8	−8	−8	−8
(Scotland) Montgomerie	−8	−8	−7	−7	−7	−7	−8	−8	−8	−8	−8	−8	−8	−8	−8	−8	−9	−8
(Sweden) Stenson	−6	−6	−6	−6	−6	−5	−5	−5	−6	−7	−7	−6	−6	−6	−6	−7	−8	−8

Cumulative tournament scores, relative to par

Eagle	Birdie	Bogey

==== Playoff ====
Place	Player	Score	To par	Money ($)
1	(United States) Tiger Woods	4-4=8	E	1,300,000
2	(United States) John Daly	4-5=9	+1	750,000

The sudden-death playoff began on the 18th hole (468 yd.) and ended on the 16th hole (336 yd.).

===== Scorecard =====
Hole	18	16
Par	4	4
(United States) Woods	E	E
(United States) Daly	E	+1

Cumulative sudden-death playoff scores, relative to par
