= 2007 WGC-Bridgestone Invitational =

Coordinates: 41.008°N 81.508°W

Tournament information
- Dates: August 2–5, 2007
- Location: Akron, Ohio, U.S.
- Course(s): Firestone Country Club
- Tour(s): PGA Tour; European Tour

Statistics
- Par: 70
- Length: 7,400
- Field: 83 players
- Cut: None
- Prize fund: $8,000,000
- Winner's share: $1,350,000

Champion
- (United States) Tiger Woods
- 272 (−8)

The 2007 WGC-Bridgestone Invitational was a golf tournament that was contested from August 2–5, 2007 over the South Course at Firestone Country Club in Akron, Ohio. It was the ninth WGC-Bridgestone Invitational tournament, and the third of three World Golf Championships events held in 2007.

World number 1 Tiger Woods won the tournament for a second hat-trick at the Invitational in his career, and claimed his 14th World Golf Championships title, which was his sixth Invitational title. He won over Justin Rose and Rory Sabbatini by eight strokes, with Woods shooting an 8-under-par 272.

== Field ==
1. Playing members of the 2006 United States and European Ryder Cup teams
Chad Campbell, Paul Casey (3,4,5), Stewart Cink (2,3,4), Darren Clarke, Chris DiMarco (2,4), Luke Donald (3,4), Sergio García (3,4), Pádraig Harrington (3,4,5), J. J. Henry, David Howell, Zach Johnson (3,4,5), Robert Karlsson (3,4), Paul McGinley, Phil Mickelson (2,3,4,5), Colin Montgomerie (3,4,5), José María Olazábal (3,4), Henrik Stenson (3,4,5), Vaughn Taylor, David Toms (2,3,4), Scott Verplank (2,3,4,5), Lee Westwood (3,4), Brett Wetterich (3,4), Tiger Woods (2,3,4,5)

- Jim Furyk (2,3,4,5) did not play.

2. Playing members of the 2005 United States and International Presidents Cup teams
Stuart Appleby (3,4), Ángel Cabrera (3,4,5), Michael Campbell, Tim Clark (3,4), Fred Funk, Retief Goosen (3,4), Mark Hensby, Trevor Immelman (3,4), Justin Leonard, Peter Lonard, Davis Love III (3,4,5), Nick O'Hern (3,4,5), Kenny Perry, Adam Scott (3,4,5), Vijay Singh (3,4,5), Mike Weir (3,4)

- Fred Couples did not play.

3. Top 50 players from the Official World Golf Rankings two weeks prior to event
Robert Allenby (4), Stephen Ames (4), Aaron Baddeley (4,5), K. J. Choi (4,5), Ernie Els (4,5), Niclas Fasth (4,5), Retief Goosen (4,5), Richard Green (4), Anders Hansen (4,5), Charles Howell III (4,5), Shingo Katayama, Jerry Kelly (4), Arron Oberholser (4), Geoff Ogilvy (4), Rod Pampling (4), Carl Pettersson (4), Ian Poulter (4), John Rollins (4), Andres Romero (4,5), Justin Rose (4,5), Rory Sabbatini (4,5), Richard Sterne (4,5), Steve Stricker (4), Boo Weekley (4,5)

4. Top 50 players from the Official World Golf Rankings one week prior to event

5. Tournament winners of worldwide events since the prior year's tournament with an Official World Golf Ranking Strength of Field Rating of 115 points or more
Woody Austin, Brian Bateman, Mark Calcavecchia, Joe Durant, Paul Goydos, Anton Haig, Grégory Havret, Charley Hoffman, Raphaël Jacquelin, José Manuel Lara, Liang Wenchong, Hunter Mahan, Troy Matteson, John Senden, Jeev Milkha Singh, Graeme Storm, Nick Watney, Mark Wilson, Yang Yong-eun

6. The winner of selected tournaments from each of the following tours:

- Japan Golf Tour: Japan Golf Tour Championship (2007) – Shingo Katayama, qualified in category 3
- PGA Tour of Australasia: Australian PGA Championship (2006) – Nick O'Hern, qualified in categories 2, 3, 4, and 5
- Sunshine Tour: Vodacom Championship (2007) – Richard Sterne, qualified in categories 3, 4, and 5
- Asian Tour: Volvo Masters of Asia (2006) – Thongchai Jaidee

== Round summaries ==
=== First round ===
Place	Player	Score	To par
T1	(England) Paul Casey	67	−3
T1	(United States) Hunter Mahan	67	−3
T1	(South Africa) Rory Sabbatini	67	−3
T4	(Australia) Stuart Appleby	68	−2
T4	(United States) Mark Calcavecchia	68	−2
T4	(United States) Arron Oberholser	68	−2
T4	(United States) Boo Weekley	68	−2
T4	(England) Lee Westwood	68	−2
T4	(United States) Tiger Woods	68	−2
T10	(United States) Chris DiMarco	69	−1
T10	(United States) Paul Goydos	69	−1
T10	(United States) Kenny Perry	69	−1
T10	(England) Justin Rose	69	−1

=== Second round ===
Place	Player	Score	To par
1	(South Africa) Rory Sabbatini	67-67=134	−6
2	(United States) Zach Johnson	71-65=136	−4
T3	(United States) Kenny Perry	69-69=138	−2
T3	(United States) Scott Verplank	70-68=138	−2
T3	(United States) Tiger Woods	68-70=138	−2
T6	(United States) Chris DiMarco	69-70=139	−1
T6	(United States) Davis Love III	74-65=139	−1
T6	(England) Lee Westwood	68-71=139	−1
T9	(United States) Mark Calcavecchia	68-72=140	E
T9	(England) Paul Casey	67-73=140	E
T9	(United States) Justin Leonard	73-67=140	E
T9	(Australia) Peter Lonard	70-70=140	E
T9	(United States) Hunter Mahan	67-73=140	E
T9	(Australia) John Senden	71-69=140	E

=== Third round ===
Place	Player	Score	To par
1	(South Africa) Rory Sabbatini	67-67-72=206	−4
2	(United States) Tiger Woods	68-70-69=207	−3
3	(United States) Kenny Perry	69-69-71=209	−1
T4	(Australia) Stuart Appleby	68-74-69=211	+1
T4	(Australia) Aaron Baddeley	70-74-67=211	+1
T4	(United States) Chris DiMarco	69-70-72=211	+1
T4	(United States) Justin Leonard	73-67-71=211	+1
T4	(United States) Hunter Mahan	67-73-71=211	+1
T4	(Argentina) Andrés Romero	71-71-69=211	+1
T4	(United States) Scott Verplank	70-68-73=211	+1

=== Final round ===
Place	Player	Score	To par	Winnings ($)
1	(United States) Tiger Woods	68-70-69-65=272	−8	1,350,000
T2	(England) Justin Rose	69-72-71-68=280	E	635,000
T2	(South Africa) Rory Sabbatini	67-67-72-74=280	E	635,000
T4	(United States) Chris DiMarco	69-70-72-70=281	+1	310,000
T4	(Australia) Peter Lonard	70-70-73-68=281	+1	310,000
T6	(South Africa) Tim Clark	71-70-72-69=282	+2	202,000
T6	(United States) Davis Love III	74-65-74-69=282	+2	202,000
T6	(Argentina) Andrés Romero	71-71-69-71=282	+2	202,000
T9	(United States) Justin Leonard	73-67-71-72=283	+3	147,500
T9	(United States) Scott Verplank	70-68-73-72=283	+3	147,500

==== Scorecard ====
Hole	1	2	3	4	5	6	7	8	9	10	11	12	13	14	15	16	17	18
Par	4	5	4	4	3	4	3	4	4	4	4	3	4	4	3	5	4	4
(United States) Woods	−4	−5	−5	−6	−6	−7	−7	−7	−7	−7	−7	−8	−8	−8	−8	−8	−8	−8
(England) Rose	+1	E	E	E	−1	−1	−1	−2	−2	−2	−1	−1	−1	E	E	E	E	E
(South Africa) Sabbatini	−5	−5	−5	−4	−3	−3	−3	−3	−1	E	E	E	E	+1	+1	+1	E	E
(United States) DiMarco	+1	E	−1	E	−1	−1	−1	−1	+1	+1	+1	E	E	E	E	E	E	+1
(Australia) Lonard	+4	+3	+4	+4	+4	+4	+3	+2	+2	+2	+2	+2	+2	+2	+1	+1	+1	+1
(United States) Perry	−2	−1	−2	E	−1	−1	−1	−1	E	+1	+1	+2	+2	+4	+4	+4	+4	+4

Cumulative tournament scores, relative to par

Birdie	Bogey	Double bogey
