= 1999 WGC-American Express Championship =

Coordinates: 36°17′09″N 5°20′02″W

Tournament information
- Dates: 4–7 November 1999
- Location: Sotogrande, San Roque, Spain
- Course(s): Valderrama Golf Club
- Tour(s): PGA Tour; European Tour

Statistics
- Par: 71
- Length: 6,830
- Field: 62 players
- Cut: None
- Prize fund: $5,000,000
- Winner's share: $1,000,000

Champion
- (United States) Tiger Woods
- 278 (−6), playoff

The 1999 WGC-American Express Championship was a golf tournament that was contested from 4–7 November 1999 at Valderrama Golf Club in Sotogrande, San Roque, Spain. It was the first WGC-American Express Championship tournament, and the third and final event in the inaugural year of the World Golf Championships.

World number 1, Tiger Woods won the tournament after defeating Miguel Ángel Jiménez in the first extra hole of a playoff. Woods held a four stroke lead going into the 17th hole but hit it into the water on the tough par 5 and ended up scoring a triple bogey that allowed Jiménez to get back in it.

== Field ==
1. Top 50 from the Official World Golf Ranking as of 1 November

Stuart Appleby (2), Stewart Cink, Darren Clarke (3), Glen Day, Steve Elkington, Ernie Els (2,3), Bob Estes (2), Carlos Franco (2), Fred Funk (2), Jim Furyk (2), Sergio García (3), Brent Geiberger (2), Retief Goosen (3), Pádraig Harrington (3), Dudley Hart, Tim Herron (2), Scott Hoch, John Huston (2), Miguel Ángel Jiménez (3), Bernhard Langer (3), Paul Lawrie (3), Tom Lehman (2), Justin Leonard (2), Davis Love III (2), Jeff Maggert (2), Phil Mickelson (2), Colin Montgomerie (3), José María Olazábal, Naomichi Ozaki (6), Craig Parry, Steve Pate (2), Chris Perry (2), Nick Price (2), Loren Roberts (2), Vijay Singh (2), Jeff Sluman (2), Hal Sutton (2), David Toms (2), Bob Tway, Brian Watts, Lee Westwood (3), Tiger Woods (2)

- Payne Stewart (2) died in a plane crash on 25 October.
- Fred Couples, David Duval (2), Lee Janzen, Mark O'Meara, Masashi Ozaki, Jesper Parnevik, and Steve Stricker did not play.

2. Top 30 on the 1999 PGA Tour money list through the Tour Championship

Notah Begay III, Dennis Paulson, Ted Tryba, Duffy Waldorf, Mike Weir

3. Top 20 on the 1999 European Tour Order of Merit through the Volvo Masters

Thomas Bjørn, Ángel Cabrera, Alex Čejka, Mark James, Robert Karlsson, Bob May, Jarrod Moseley (4), Jarmo Sandelin, Jean van de Velde

- John Bickerton did not play.

4. Top 3 on the 1998–99 PGA Tour of Australasia Order of Merit

Rod Pampling, Craig Spence

5. Top 3 on the 1998–99 Southern Africa Tour Order of Merit

Scott Dunlap, David Frost, Richard Kaplan

6. Top 3 on the 1999 Japan Golf Tour Order of Merit through the Philip Morris Championship

Kazuhiko Hosokawa

- Shigeki Maruyama did not play.

== Round summaries ==
=== First round ===
Place	Player	Score	To par
1	(Fiji) Vijay Singh	67	−4
2	(United States) Jim Furyk	68	−3
T3	(United States) Bob Estes	69	−2
T3	(United States) Scott Hoch	69	−2
T3	(England) Mark James	69	−2
T3	(United States) Phil Mickelson	69	−2
T3	(Zimbabwe) Nick Price	69	−2
T8	(United States) Jeff Maggert	70	−1
T8	(Scotland) Colin Montgomerie	70	−1
T8	(United States) Chris Perry	70	−1
T8	(Sweden) Jarmo Sandelin	70	−1

=== Second round ===
Place	Player	Score	To par
T1	(United States) Tim Herron	71-66=137	−5
T1	(United States) Chris Perry	70-67=137	−5
T3	(United States) Justin Leonard	71-67=138	−4
T3	(Fiji) Vijay Singh	67-71=138	−4
T5	(United States) Fred Funk	71-68=139	−3
T5	(United States) Scott Hoch	69-70=139	−3
T5	(England) Mark James	69-70=139	−3
T5	(United States) Tom Lehman	72-67=139	−3
T9	(United States) Stewart Cink	75-65=140	−2
T9	(Spain) Miguel Ángel Jiménez	72-68=140	−2
T9	(United States) Phil Mickelson	69-71=140	−2
T9	(Zimbabwe) Nick Price	69-71=140	−2
T9	(United States) David Toms	72-68=140	−2
T9	(England) Lee Westwood	73-67=140	−2
T9	(United States) Tiger Woods	71-69=140	−2

=== Third round ===
Place	Player	Score	To par
T1	(Spain) Miguel Ángel Jiménez	72-68-69=209	−4
T1	(United States) Chris Perry	70-67-72=209	−4
T3	(United States) Tom Lehman	72-67-71=210	−3
T3	(United States) Justin Leonard	71-67-72=210	−3
T3	(Zimbabwe) Nick Price	69-71-70=210	−3
T3	(United States) Hal Sutton	75-66-69=210	−3
T3	(United States) Tiger Woods	71-69-70=210	−3
T8	(United States) Stewart Cink	75-65-71=211	−2
T8	(United States) Scott Hoch	69-70-72=211	−2
T8	(Spain) José María Olazábal	73-69-69=211	−2
T8	(United States) David Toms	72-68-71=211	−2
T8	(England) Lee Westwood	73-67-71=211	−2

=== Final round ===
Place	Player	Score	To par	Money ($)
T1	(United States) Tiger Woods	71-69-70-68=278	−6	Playoff
T1	(Spain) Miguel Ángel Jiménez	72-68-69-69=278	−6	Playoff
3	(United States) Dudley Hart	75-68-70-70=283	−1	300,000
T4	(United States) Stewart Cink	75-65-71-73=284	E	176,667
T4	(Zimbabwe) Nick Price	69-71-70-74=284	E	176,667
T4	(England) Lee Westwood	73-67-71-73=284	E	176,667
T7	(United States) Fred Funk	71-68-74-72=285	+1	135,000
T7	(Spain) Sergio García	74-69-69-73=285	+1	135,000
T7	(United States) Scott Hoch	69-70-72-74=285	+1	135,000
T7	(United States) Chris Perry	70-67-72-76=285	+1	135,000

==== Playoff ====
Place	Player	Score	To par	Money ($)
1	(United States) Tiger Woods	3	−1	1,000,000
2	(Spain) Miguel Ángel Jiménez	5	+1	400,000

- Played on the par-4 18th hole,
