= 1999 WGC-NEC Invitational =

Coordinates: 41.008°N 81.508°W

Tournament information
- Dates: August 26–29, 1999
- Location: Akron, Ohio, U.S.
- Course(s): Firestone Country Club
- Tour(s): PGA Tour; European Tour

Statistics
- Par: 70
- Length: 7,139
- Field: 41 players
- Cut: None
- Prize fund: $5,000,000
- Winner's share: $1,000,000

Champion
- (United States) Tiger Woods
- 270 (−10)

The 1999 WGC-NEC Invitational was a golf tournament that was contested from August 26–29, 1999 over the South Course at Firestone Country Club in Akron, Ohio. It was the first WGC-NEC Invitational tournament, and was the second of the three World Golf Championships that were held in the series' inaugural year. The Invitational succeeded the World Series of Golf which had been played at Firestone from 1976 until 1998.

World number 1 Tiger Woods won the tournament, shooting a 62 (-8) in the third round on his way to a one-stroke victory over Phil Mickelson.

== Field ==
1. 1999 United States and European Ryder Cup teams

- United States: David Duval (2), Jim Furyk (2), Tom Lehman, Justin Leonard (2), Davis Love III (2), Jeff Maggert, Phil Mickelson (2), Mark O'Meara (2), Steve Pate, Payne Stewart, Hal Sutton, Tiger Woods (2)
- Europe: Darren Clarke, Andrew Coltart, Sergio García, Pádraig Harrington, Miguel Ángel Jiménez, Paul Lawrie, Colin Montgomerie, José María Olazábal, Jesper Parnevik, Jarmo Sandelin, Jean van de Velde, Lee Westwood

2. 1998 United States and International Presidents Cup teams

- United States: Mark Calcavecchia, Fred Couples, Scott Hoch, John Huston, Lee Janzen
- International: Stuart Appleby, Steve Elkington, Ernie Els, Carlos Franco, Shigeki Maruyama, Frank Nobilo, Greg Norman, Naomichi Ozaki, Craig Parry, Nick Price, Vijay Singh, Greg Turner

== Round summaries ==
=== First round ===
Place	Player	Score	To par
1	(United States) Tiger Woods	66	−4
T2	(United States) David Duval	67	−3
T2	(United States) Jim Furyk	67	−3
T2	(Spain) Sergio García	67	−3
T2	(Scotland) Paul Lawrie	67	−3
T2	(United States) Tom Lehman	67	−3
T2	(Zimbabwe) Nick Price	67	−3
T8	(United States) Mark Calcavecchia	68	−2
T8	(Paraguay) Carlos Franco	68	−2
T8	(United States) Scott Hoch	68	−2
T8	(United States) Davis Love III	68	−2

=== Second round ===
Place	Player	Score	To par
T1	(Paraguay) Carlos Franco	68-67=135	−5
T1	(Scotland) Paul Lawrie	67-68=135	−5
T3	(United States) Phil Mickelson	69-67=136	−4
T3	(Zimbabwe) Nick Price	67-69=136	−4
T3	(United States) Hal Sutton	69-67=136	−4
T6	(United States) Mark Calcavecchia	68-69=137	−3
T6	(Spain) Sergio García	67-70=137	−3
T6	(United States) Davis Love III	68-69=137	−3
T6	(Australia) Craig Parry	71-66=137	−3
T6	(United States) Payne Stewart	70-67=137	−3
T6	(United States) Tiger Woods	66-71=137	−3

=== Third round ===
Place	Player	Score	To par
1	(United States) Tiger Woods	66-71-62=199	−11
T2	(United States) Fred Couples	71-70-63=204	−6
T2	(Zimbabwe) Nick Price	67-69-68=204	−6
4	(Paraguay) Carlos Franco	68-67-70=205	−5
T5	(Spain) Sergio García	67-70-69=206	−4
T5	(United States) Tom Lehman	67-72-67=206	−4
T5	(United States) Phil Mickelson	69-67-70=206	−4
T5	(Australia) Craig Parry	71-66-69=206	−4
T5	(United States) Payne Stewart	70-67-69=206	−4
T10	(United States) Ernie Els	71-69-67=207	−3
T10	(United States) Davis Love III	68-69-70=207	−3
T10	(United States) Jeff Maggert	71-67-69=207	−3

=== Final round ===
Place	Player	Score	To par	Winnings ($)
1	(United States) Tiger Woods	66-71-62-71=270	−10	1,000,000
2	(United States) Phil Mickelson	69-67-70-65=271	−9	510,000
T3	(Australia) Craig Parry	71-66-69-69=275	−5	327,500
T3	(Zimbabwe) Nick Price	67-69-68-71=275	−5	327,500
5	(South Africa) Ernie Els	71-69-67-69=276	−4	234,000
6	(Japan) Shigeki Maruyama	72-67-70-68=277	−3	179,000
T7	(Paraguay) Carlos Franco	68-67-70-73=278	−2	154,000
T7	(Spain) Sergio García	67-70-69-72=278	−2	154,000
T7	(United States) Jeff Maggert	71-67-69-71=278	−2	154,000
T10	(United States) Jim Furyk	67-72-69-71=279	−1	129,000
T10	(United States) Davis Love III	68-69-70-72=279	−1	129,000
