= 2006 WGC-Bridgestone Invitational =

Coordinates: 41.008°N 81.508°W

Tournament information
- Dates: August 24–27, 2006
- Location: Akron, Ohio, U.S.
- Course(s): Firestone Country Club
- Tour(s): PGA Tour; European Tour

Statistics
- Par: 70
- Length: 7,360
- Field: 78 players
- Cut: None
- Prize fund: $7,500,000
- Winner's share: $1,300,000

Champion
- (United States) Tiger Woods
- 270 (−10), playoff

The 2006 WGC-Bridgestone Invitational was a golf tournament that was contested from August 24–27, 2006 over the South Course at Firestone Country Club in Akron, Ohio. It was the eighth WGC-Bridgestone Invitational tournament, and the second of four World Golf Championships events held in 2006.

World number 1 Tiger Woods won the tournament to retain the WGC-Bridgestone Invitational and claim his 11th World Golf Championships title, which was his fifth Invitational title. He won in a playoff over Stewart Cink, who also shot a 10-under-par 270.

== Round summaries ==
=== First round ===
Place	Player	Score	To par
1	(Australia) Adam Scott	63	−7
2	(United States) Jason Gore	65	−5
3	(United States) Lucas Glover	66	−4
T4	(New Zealand) Michael Campbell	67	−3
T4	(England) Luke Donald	67	−3
T4	(England) David Howell	67	−3
T4	(United States) Davis Love III	67	−3
T4	(United States) David Toms	67	−3
T4	(United States) Tiger Woods	67	−3
T10	(United States) Olin Browne	68	−2
T10	(United States) Chad Campbell	68	−2
T10	(South Africa) Tim Clark	68	−2
T10	(United States) Chris DiMarco	68	−2
T10	(South Africa) Ernie Els	68	−2
T10	(Spain) José María Olazábal	68	−2
T10	(United States) Kevin Stadler	68	−2

=== Second round ===
Place	Player	Score	To par
1	(United States) Tiger Woods	67-64=131	−9
2	(United States) Davis Love III	67-65=132	−8
T3	(United States) Jim Furyk	69-65=134	−6
T3	(Australia) Adam Scott	63-71=134	−6
T5	(South Africa) Ernie Els	68-67=135	−5
T5	(United States) Lucas Glover	66-69=135	−5
T5	(United States) Kevin Stadler	68-67=135	−5
8	(England) Luke Donald	67-69=136	−4
T9	(United States) Stewart Cink	70-67=137	−3
T9	(United States) Robert Gamez	70-67=137	−3

=== Third round ===
Place	Player	Score	To par
1	(United States) Stewart Cink	70-67-64=201	−9
T2	(England) Paul Casey	69-69-64=202	−8
T2	(United States) Davis Love III	67-65-70=202	−8
T2	(United States) Tiger Woods	67-64-71=202	−8
5	(United States) Jim Furyk	69-65-69=203	−7
6	(United States) Lucas Glover	66-69-69=204	−6
T7	(South Africa) Ernie Els	68-67-70=205	−5
T7	(Australia) Adam Scott	63-71-71=205	−5
T7	(United States) Kevin Stadler	68-67-70=205	−5
T10	(Denmark) Thomas Bjørn	72-67-67=206	−4
T10	(England) Luke Donald	67-69-70=206	−4
T10	(United States) J. J. Henry	70-68-68=206	−4
T10	(United States) David Toms	67-74-65=206	−4

=== Final round ===
Place	Player	Score	To par	Winnings ($)
T1	(United States) Tiger Woods	67-64-71-68=270	−10	1,300,000
T1	(United States) Stewart Cink	70-67-64-69=270	−10	750,000
3	(United States) Jim Furyk	69-65-69-68=271	−9	450,000
T4	(Argentina) Ángel Cabrera	70-68-70-65=273	−7	246,250
T4	(England) Paul Casey	69-69-64-71=273	−7	246,250
T4	(United States) Lucas Glover	66-69-69-69=273	−7	246,250
T4	(United States) Davis Love III	67-65-70-71=273	−7	246,250
T8	(England) Luke Donald	67-69-70-68=274	−6	152,500
T8	(United States) David Toms	67-74-65-68=274	−6	152,500
T10	(United States) J. J. Henry	70-68-68-69=275	−5	120,000
T10	(United States) Arron Oberholser	70-71-69-65=275	−5	120,000
T10	(Australia) Adam Scott	63-71-71-70=275	−5	120,000

==== Scorecard ====
Hole	1	2	3	4	5	6	7	8	9	10	11	12	13	14	15	16	17	18
Par	4	5	4	4	3	4	3	4	4	4	4	3	4	4	3	5	4	4
(United States) Woods	−8	−9	−9	−9	−9	−9	−9	−9	−8	−9	−9	−10	−11	−11	−11	−10	−10	−10
(United States) Cink	−9	−10	−10	−10	−10	−10	−10	−10	−9	−9	−8	−8	−8	−8	−8	−9	−10	−10
(United States) Furyk	−8	−9	−10	−10	−10	−9	−9	−9	−10	−9	−9	−9	−9	−8	−8	−9	−9	−9
(Argentina) Cabrera	−2	−3	−4	−4	−5	−6	−7	−7	−7	−6	−6	−6	−6	−6	−7	−7	−7	−7
(England) Casey	−8	−8	−9	−9	−9	−9	−9	−10	−10	−10	−9	−9	−8	−8	−8	−7	−7	−7
(United States) Glover	−6	−7	−7	−6	−6	−7	−7	−7	−6	−6	−6	−6	−6	−6	−6	−7	−7	−7
(United States) Love	−6	−7	−7	−8	−8	−8	−8	−8	−8	−7	−7	−7	−7	−6	−5	−6	−6	−7

Cumulative tournament scores, relative to par

Birdie	Bogey	Double bogey

==== Sudden-death playoff ====
Player	Score				
Player	18	17	18	17	Total
Tiger Woods	4	4	5	3	16
Stewart Cink	4	4	5	4	17
