= 2000 WGC-NEC Invitational =

Coordinates: 41.008°N 81.508°W

Tournament information
- Dates: August 24–27, 2000
- Location: Akron, Ohio, U.S.
- Course(s): Firestone Country Club
- Tour(s): PGA Tour; European Tour

Statistics
- Par: 70
- Length: 7,139
- Field: 37 players
- Cut: None
- Prize fund: $5,000,000
- Winner's share: $1,000,000

Champion
- (United States) Tiger Woods
- 259 (−21)

The 2000 WGC-NEC Invitational was a golf tournament from August 24–27, 2000 over the South Course at Firestone Country Club in Akron, Ohio. It was the second WGC-NEC Invitational tournament, and the second of four World Golf Championships events in 2000.

World number 1 Tiger Woods won the tournament to retain the WGC-NEC Invitational and claim his third World Golf Championships title. He won by an eleven-stroke margin, and set the tournament record for aggregate score (259) and score to-par (−21), having tied José María Olazábal's course record of 61 in the second round. His final approach to the 18th green was famously in the dark, hitting his iron shot to within a couple of feet of the hole. He would make birdie to seal the victory.

== Field ==
1. 2000 United States and International Presidents Cup teams

- United States: Paul Azinger, Notah Begay III, Stewart Cink, Jim Furyk (2), Tom Lehman (2), Davis Love III (2), Phil Mickelson (2), Loren Roberts, Hal Sutton (2), Kirk Triplett, Tiger Woods (2)

- David Duval (2) did not play due to injury.

- International: Robert Allenby, Stuart Appleby, Michael Campbell, Ernie Els, Carlos Franco, Retief Goosen, Shigeki Maruyama, Greg Norman, Nick Price, Mike Weir

- Steve Elkington and Vijay Singh did not play due to injury.

2. 1999 United States Ryder Cup team

Justin Leonard, Jeff Maggert, Mark O'Meara, Steve Pate

- Payne Stewart died in a plane crash in November 1999.

3. The leading 12 European players from the European Tour Order of Merit after the Victor Chandler British Masters

Thomas Bjørn, Darren Clarke, Andrew Coltart, Pádraig Harrington, Miguel Ángel Jiménez, Paul McGinley, Colin Montgomerie, José María Olazábal, Gary Orr, Phillip Price, Lee Westwood, Ian Woosnam

== Round summaries ==
=== First round ===
Place	Player	Score	To par
1	(United States) Tiger Woods	64	−6
2	(United States) Jim Furyk	65	−5
T3	(Northern Ireland) Darren Clarke	66	−4
T3	(Paraguay) Carlos Franco	66	−4
T3	(United States) Justin Leonard	66	−4
T3	(United States) Phil Mickelson	66	−4
T3	(Wales) Phillip Price	66	−4
T3	(England) Lee Westwood	66	−4
T9	(Australia) Stuart Appleby	67	−3
T9	(South Africa) Ernie Els	67	−3
T9	(Spain) José María Olazábal	67	−3
T9	(United States) Loren Roberts	67	−3

=== Second round ===
Place	Player	Score	To par
1	(United States) Tiger Woods	64-61=125	−15
2	(United States) Phil Mickelson	66-66=132	−8
3	(United States) Justin Leonard	66-67=133	−7
4	(United States) Jim Furyk	65-69=134	−6
T5	(Wales) Phillip Price	66-69=135	−5
T5	(England) Lee Westwood	66-69=135	−5
T7	(United States) Loren Roberts	67-69=136	−4
T7	(United States) Hal Sutton	68-68=136	−4
T9	(Australia) Stuart Appleby	67-70=137	−3
T9	(Northern Ireland) Darren Clarke	66-71=137	−3

=== Third round ===
Place	Player	Score	To par
1	(United States) Tiger Woods	64-61-67=192	−18
T2	(United States) Phil Mickelson	66-66-69=201	−9
T2	(Wales) Phillip Price	66-69-66=201	−9
T2	(United States) Hal Sutton	68-68-65=201	−9
5	(United States) Loren Roberts	67-69-66=202	−8
6	(United States) Jim Furyk	65-69-69=203	−7
7	(United States) Justin Leonard	66-67-71=204	−6
8	(Scotland) Colin Montgomerie	71-69-66=206	−4
T9	(Australia) Stuart Appleby	67-70-70=207	−3
T9	(Scotland) Andrew Coltart	69-69-69=207	−3
T9	(South Africa) Ernie Els	67-71-69=207	−3

=== Final round ===
Place	Player	Score	To par	Winnings ($)
1	(United States) Tiger Woods	64-61-67-67=259	−21	1,000,000
T2	(United States) Justin Leonard	66-67-71-66=270	−10	437,500
T2	(Wales) Phillip Price	66-69-66-69=270	−10	437,500
T4	(United States) Jim Furyk	65-69-69-68=271	−9	243,333
T4	(United States) Phil Mickelson	66-66-69-70=271	−9	243,333
T4	(United States) Hal Sutton	68-68-65-70=271	−9	243,333
7	(United States) Stewart Cink	72-69-68-63=272	−8	170,000
T8	(United States) Paul Azinger	68-70-70-65=273	−7	147,500
T8	(Scotland) Colin Montgomerie	71-69-66-67=273	−7	147,500
T10	(Denmark) Thomas Bjørn	69-69-70-66=274	−6	125,000
T10	(Spain) José María Olazábal	67-73-69-65=274	−6	125,000
