= 2004 WGC-Accenture Match Play Championship =

Golf tournament

Coordinates: 33°05′32.16″N 117°16′01.33″W

Tournament information
- Dates: February 25–29, 2004
- Location: Carlsbad, California
- Course: La Costa Resort and Spa
- Tours: PGA Tour; European Tour

Statistics
- Par: 72
- Length: 7,247
- Field: 64 players
- Prize fund: $7,000,000
- Winner's share: $1,200,000

Champion
- (United States) Tiger Woods
- def. Davis Love III 3 & 2

The 2004 WGC-Accenture Match Play Championship was a golf tournament that was played from February 25–29, 2004 at La Costa Resort and Spa in Carlsbad, California. It was the sixth WGC-Accenture Match Play Championship and the first of four World Golf Championships events held in 2004.

Tiger Woods won his eighth World Golf Championships event, and his second match play back-to-back, by defeating Davis Love III 3 and 2 in the 36 hole final.

== Brackets ==
The Championship was a single elimination match play event. The field consisted of the top 64 players available from the Official World Golf Rankings, seeded according to the rankings. Ernie Els (ranked 3) withdrew from the event, electing to stay home because his daughter was to start school in London the next week. Jim Furyk (ranked 5) withdrew because of a wrist injury and Kirk Triplett (ranked 42) also withdrew for personal reasons. They were replaced by Briny Baird (ranked 65), Shingo Katayama (ranked 66) and John Rollins (ranked 67).

=== Bobby Jones bracket ===
First round February 25
1	(United States) Tiger Woods	1up
16	(United States) John Rollins
8	(South Africa) Trevor Immelman	2&1
9	(Japan) Shigeki Maruyama
5	(Sweden) Freddie Jacobson	5&4
12	(Wales) Phillip Price
4	(Denmark) Thomas Bjørn	4&3
13	(United States) Scott Hoch
6	(United States) Scott Verplank
11	(United States) Bob Estes	19h
3	(Republic of Ireland) Pádraig Harrington	2&1
14	(Japan) Toshimitsu Izawa
7	(England) Paul Casey
10	(United States) Shaun Micheel	21h
2	(United States) David Toms	19h
15	(Sweden) Niclas Fasth

Second round February 26
1	(United States) Tiger Woods	5&4
8	(South Africa) Trevor Immelman
5	(Sweden) Freddie Jacobson	5&4
4	(Denmark) Thomas Bjørn
11	(United States) Bob Estes
3	(Republic of Ireland) Pádraig Harrington	3&2
10	(United States) Shaun Micheel
2	(United States) David Toms	4&3

Third round February 27
1	(United States) Tiger Woods	5&4
5	(Sweden) Freddie Jacobson
3	(Republic of Ireland) Pádraig Harrington	1up
2	(United States) David Toms

Fourth round February 28
1	(United States) Tiger Woods	2&1
3	(Republic of Ireland) Pádraig Harrington

=== Ben Hogan bracket ===
First round February 25
1	(Canada) Mike Weir	3&2
16	(United States) Rich Beem
8	(Australia) Stephen Leaney	1up
9	(United States) Fred Funk
5	(South Korea) K. J. Choi
12	(United States) Stewart Cink	4&2
4	(Zimbabwe) Nick Price
13	(Scotland) Colin Montgomerie	20h
6	(United States) Chris Riley
11	(England) Ian Poulter	1up
3	(United States) Jonathan Kaye
14	(United States) Duffy Waldorf	5&4
7	(Australia) Peter Lonard	1up
10	(United States) Rocco Mediate
2	(South Africa) Retief Goosen
15	(United States) John Huston	2&1

Second round February 26
1	(Canada) Mike Weir
8	(Australia) Stephen Leaney	3&2
12	(United States) Stewart Cink
13	(Scotland) Colin Montgomerie	5&4
11	(England) Ian Poulter	7&5
14	(United States) Duffy Waldorf
7	(Australia) Peter Lonard
15	(United States) John Huston	1up

Third round February 27
8	(Australia) Stephen Leaney	1up
13	(Scotland) Colin Montgomerie
11	(England) Ian Poulter	2&1
15	(United States) John Huston

Fourth round February 28
8	(Australia) Stephen Leaney	1up
11	(England) Ian Poulter

=== Gary Player bracket ===
First round February 25
1	(Fiji) Vijay Singh	5&3
16	(Japan) Shingo Katayama
8	(United States) Jerry Kelly	1up
9	(Spain) Sergio García
5	(United States) Jay Haas
12	(United States) Loren Roberts	1up
4	(United States) Chad Campbell	3&2
13	(United States) Tim Herron
6	(United States) Justin Leonard
11	(Germany) Alex Čejka	4&3
3	(Northern Ireland) Darren Clarke	25h
14	(Argentina) Eduardo Romero
7	(United States) Brad Faxon
10	(United States) Steve Flesch	19h
2	(United States) Kenny Perry	6&4
15	(United States) Jeff Sluman

Second round February 26
1	(Fiji) Vijay Singh
8	(United States) Jerry Kelly	4&2
12	(United States) Loren Roberts
4	(United States) Chad Campbell	3&1
11	(Germany) Alex Čejka
3	(Northern Ireland) Darren Clarke	6&5
10	(United States) Steve Flesch
2	(United States) Kenny Perry	1up

Third round February 27
8	(United States) Jerry Kelly	1up
4	(United States) Chad Campbell
3	(Northern Ireland) Darren Clarke	3&2
2	(United States) Kenny Perry

Fourth round February 28
8	(United States) Jerry Kelly
3	(Northern Ireland) Darren Clarke	5&3

=== Sam Snead bracket ===
First round February 25
1	(United States) Davis Love III	2up
16	(United States) Briny Baird
8	(United States) Bob Tway
9	(United States) Fred Couples	3&2
5	(Australia) Adam Scott	2&1
12	(Spain) Miguel Á. Jiménez
4	(Australia) Robert Allenby	3&2
13	(England) Brian Davis
6	(United States) Chris DiMarco	2up
11	(New Zealand) Michael Campbell
3	(Australia) Stuart Appleby	5&4
14	(England) Justin Rose
7	(United States) Charles Howell III
10	(United States) Ben Curtis	2up
2	(United States) Phil Mickelson	3&1
15	(England) Lee Westwood

Second round February 26
1	(United States) Davis Love III	3&2
9	(United States) Fred Couples
5	(Australia) Adam Scott	23h
4	(Australia) Robert Allenby
6	(United States) Chris DiMarco	19h
3	(Australia) Stuart Appleby
10	(United States) Ben Curtis
2	(United States) Phil Mickelson	7&6

Third round February 27
1	(United States) Davis Love III	4&3
5	(Australia) Adam Scott
6	(United States) Chris DiMarco
2	(United States) Phil Mickelson	3&2

Fourth round February 28
1	(United States) Davis Love III	3&2
2	(United States) Phil Mickelson

=== Final Four ===
Semi-finals; February 28
1	(United States) Tiger Woods	2&1
8	(Australia) Stephen Leaney
3	(Northern Ireland) Darren Clarke
1	(United States) Davis Love III	21h

Finals; February 29
1	(United States) Tiger Woods	3&2
1	(United States) Davis Love III
Third place
8	(Australia) Stephen Leaney
3	(Northern Ireland) Darren Clarke	2up

== Prize money breakdown ==
Place	US ($)
Champion	1,200,000
Runner-up	700,000
Third place	530,000
Fourth place	430,000
Losing quarter-finalists x 4	225,000
Losing third round x 8	115,000
Losing second round x 16	75,000
Losing first round x 32	35,000
Total	$7,000,000
