= 2003 WGC-Accenture Match Play Championship =

Coordinates: 33°05′32.16″N 117°16′01.33″W

Tournament information
- Dates: February 26 – March 2, 2003
- Location: Carlsbad, California
- Course(s): La Costa Resort and Spa
- Tour(s): PGA Tour; European Tour

Statistics
- Par: 72
- Length: 7,247
- Field: 64 players
- Prize fund: $6,000,000
- Winner's share: $1,050,000

Champion
- (United States) Tiger Woods
- def. David Toms 2 & 1

The 2003 WGC-Accenture Match Play Championship was a golf tournament that was played from February 26 to March 2, 2003 at La Costa Resort and Spa in Carlsbad, California. It was the fifth WGC-Accenture Match Play Championship and the first of four World Golf Championships events held in 2003.

Tiger Woods won his sixth World Golf Championships event, and his first ever match play victory, by defeating David Toms 2 and 1 in the 36 hole final.

== Brackets ==
The Championship was a single elimination match play event. The field consisted of the top 64 players available from the Official World Golf Rankings, seeded according to the rankings. Vijay Singh (ranked 4) withdrew with a rib injury, Nick Faldo (ranked 54) withdrew because of flu and Toru Taniguchi (ranked 55) withdrew because of injury. They were replaced by Robert Karlsson (ranked 65), Phil Tataurangi (ranked 66) and Carl Pettersson (ranked 67).

=== Bobby Jones bracket ===
First round February 26
1	(United States) Tiger Woods	2&1
16	(Sweden) Carl Pettersson
8	(South Korea) K. J. Choi	1up
9	(United States) Fred Funk
5	(United States) Bob Estes
12	(Australia) Stephen Leaney	2&1
4	(United States) Justin Leonard	2up
13	(Spain) José M. Olazábal
6	(Argentina) Eduardo Romero	2&1
11	(United States) John Huston
3	(United States) Chris DiMarco
14	(Japan) Toshimitsu Izawa	2&1
7	(United States) Scott Hoch	3&1
10	(United States) Tom Lehman
2	(Republic of Ireland) Pádraig Harrington	4&3
15	(United States) John Cook

Second round February 27
1	(United States) Tiger Woods	5&3
8	(South Korea) K.J. Choi
12	(Australia) Stephen Leaney	6&5
4	(United States) Justin Leonard
6	(Argentina) Eduardo Romero
14	(Japan) Toshi Izawa	3&1
2	(Republic of Ireland) Pádraig Harrington
7	(United States) Scott Hoch	3&2

Third round February 28
1	(United States) Tiger Woods	7&6
12	(Australia) Stephen Leaney
14	(Japan) Toshi Izawa
7	(United States) Scott Hoch	4&3

Fourth round March 1
1	(United States) Tiger Woods	5&4
7	(United States) Scott Hoch

=== Ben Hogan bracket ===
First round February 26
1	(South Africa) Retief Goosen
16	(United States) Jay Haas	5&3
8	(Japan) Shigeki Maruyama	4&3
9	(United States) Scott McCarron
5	(United States) Charles Howell III
12	(Sweden) Niclas Fasth	1up
4	(Zimbabwe) Nick Price	4&3
13	(Scotland) Paul Lawrie
6	(Germany) Bernhard Langer
11	(Australia) Adam Scott	3&2
3	(United States) Rocco Mediate	1up
14	(Japan) Shingo Katayama
7	(United States) David Duval
10	(England) Justin Rose	20h
2	(Spain) Sergio García
15	(United States) Kevin Sutherland	2&1

Second round February 27
16	(United States) Jay Haas	1up
8	(Japan) Shegeki Maruyama
12	(Sweden) Niclas Fasth
4	(Zimbabwe) Nick Price	2&1
11	(Australia) Adam Scott	1up
3	(United States) Rocco Mediate
10	(England) Justin Rose
15	(United States) Kevin Sutherland	1up

Third round February 28
16	(United States) Jay Haas	20h
4	(Zimbabwe) Nick Price
11	(Australia) Adam Scott	2&1
15	(United States) Kevin Sutherland

Fourth round March 1
16	(United States) Jay Haas
11	(Australia) Adam Scott	2&1

=== Gary Player bracket ===
First round February 26
1	(South Africa) Ernie Els
16	(New Zealand) Phil Tataurangi	20h
8	(Australia) Peter Lonard	2&1
9	(United States) Kenny Perry
5	(New Zealand) Michael Campbell
12	(United States) Jeff Sluman	3&2
4	(Australia) Robert Allenby	4&2
13	(South Africa) Trevor Immelman
6	(United States) Rich Beem
11	(United States) Steve Lowery	2up
3	(United States) Jim Furyk	2&1
14	(United States) Len Mattiace
7	(Northern Ireland) Darren Clarke	4&3
10	(South Africa) Tim Clark
2	(United States) Davis Love III	5&4
15	(England) Paul Casey

Second round February 27
16	(New Zealand) Phil Tataurangi
8	(Australia) Peter Lonard	5&4
12	(United States) Jeff Sluman
4	(Australia) Robert Allenby	1up
11	(United States) Steve Lowery
3	(United States) Jim Furyk	6&5
7	(Northern Ireland) Darren Clarke	7&6
2	(United States) Davis Love III

Third round February 28
8	(Australia) Peter Lonard	1up
4	(Australia) Robert Allenby
3	(United States) Jim Furyk
7	(Northern Ireland) Darren Clarke	2up

Fourth round March 1
8	(Australia) Peter Lonard	2up
7	(Northern Ireland) Darren Clarke

=== Sam Snead bracket ===
First round February 26
1	(United States) Phil Mickelson	1up
16	(Sweden) Robert Karlsson
8	(Australia) Craig Parry
9	(United States) Brad Faxon	2&1
5	(United States) Jerry Kelly	5&4
12	(Denmark) Thomas Bjørn
4	(Canada) Mike Weir	26h
13	(United States) Loren Roberts
6	(Argentina) Ángel Cabrera	3&2
11	(United States) Scott Verplank
3	(Scotland) Colin Montgomerie
14	(Germany) Alex Čejka	4&2
7	(Australia) Stuart Appleby
10	(United States) Chris Riley	1up
2	(United States) David Toms	3&1
15	(Denmark) Søren Hansen

Second round February 27
1	(United States) Phil Mickelson	3&2
9	(United States) Brad Faxon
5	(United States) Jerry Kelly	2&1
4	(Canada) Mike Weir
6	(Argentina) Ángel Cabrera
14	(Germany) Alex Čejka	4&2
10	(United States) Chris Riley
2	(United States) David Toms	1up

Third round February 28
1	(United States) Phil Mickelson
5	(United States) Jerry Kelly	3&2
14	(Germany) Alex Čejka
2	(United States) David Toms	1up

Fourth round March 1
5	(United States) Jerry Kelly
2	(United States) David Toms	4&3

=== Final Four ===
Semi-finals; March 1
1	(United States) Tiger Woods	19h
11	(Australia) Adam Scott
8	(Australia) Peter Lonard
2	(United States) David Toms	1up

Finals; March 2
1	(United States) Tiger Woods	2&1
2	(United States) David Toms
Third place
11	(Australia) Adam Scott	1up
8	(Australia) Peter Lonard

== Prize money breakdown ==
Place	US ($)
Champion	1,050,000
Runner-up	600,000
Third place	480,000
Fourth place	390,000
Losing quarter-finalists x 4	200,000
Losing third round x 8	95,000
Losing second round x 16	60,000
Losing first round x 32	30,000
Total	$6,000,000
