= 2003 WGC-American Express Championship =

Tournament information
- Dates: October 2–5, 2003
- Location: Woodstock, Georgia, U.S.
- Course(s): Capital City Club's (Crabapple Course)
- Tour(s): PGA Tour; European Tour

Statistics
- Par: 70
- Length: 7,189
- Field: 72 players
- Cut: None
- Prize fund: $6,000,000
- Winner's share: $1,050,000

Champion
- (United States) Tiger Woods
- 274 (−6)

The 2003 WGC-American Express Championship was a golf tournament that was contested from October 2–5, 2003 over the Capital City Club's Crabapple Course in Woodstock, Georgia. It was the fourth WGC-American Express Championship tournament and the third of four World Golf Championships events held in 2003.

World number 1 Tiger Woods won the tournament to capture his third WGC-American Express Championship and his seventh World Golf Championships title.

== Round summaries ==
=== First round ===
Place	Player	Score	To par
1	(Spain) Sergio García	65	−5
T2	(United States) Tim Herron	66	−4
T2	(United States) Rocco Mediate	66	−4
T4	(South Korea) K. J. Choi	67	−3
T4	(United States) Tiger Woods	67	−3
T6	(Sweden) Niclas Fasth	68	−2
T6	(Spain) Ignacio Garrido	68	−2
T8	(Northern Ireland) Darren Clarke	69	−1
T8	(Australia) Peter O'Malley	69	−1
T8	(India) Jyoti Randhawa	69	−1
T8	(United States) Loren Roberts	69	−1
T8	(Canada) Mike Weir	69	−1

=== Second round ===
Place	Player	Score	To par
1	(United States) Tiger Woods	67-66=133	−7
T2	(South Korea) K. J. Choi	67-71=138	−2
T2	(Spain) Sergio García	65-73=138	−2
T2	(United States) Tim Herron	66-72=138	−2
T2	(United States) Rocco Mediate	66-72=138	−2
T6	(Australia) Stuart Appleby	71-68=139	−1
T6	(Spain) Ignacio Garrido	68-71=139	−1
8	(Fiji) Vijay Singh	70-70=140	E
T9	(South Africa) Retief Goosen	73-69=142	+2
T9	(United States) Jerry Kelly	70-72=142	+2
T9	(Canada) Mike Weir	69-73=142	+2

=== Third round ===
Place	Player	Score	To par
1	(United States) Tiger Woods	67-66-69=202	−8
2	(Fiji) Vijay Singh	70-70-64=204	−6
3	(United States) Tim Herron	66-72-67=205	−5
4	(South Korea) K. J. Choi	67-71-68=206	−4
T5	(Australia) Stuart Appleby	71-68-69=208	−2
T5	(Spain) Sergio García	65-73-70=208	−2
T5	(Spain) Ignacio Garrido	68-71-69=208	−2
8	(South Africa) Retief Goosen	73-69-67=209	−1
9	(England) Paul Casey	73-71-66=210	E
T10	(United States) Rocco Mediate	66-72-73=211	+1
T10	(United States) Jerry Kelly	70-72-69=211	+1

== Final leaderboard ==
Place	Player	Score	To par	Winnings ($)
1	(United States) Tiger Woods	67-66-69-72=274	−6	1,050,000
T2	(Australia) Stuart Appleby	71-68-69-68=276	−4	405,000
T2	(United States) Tim Herron	66-72-67-71=276	−4	405,000
T2	(Fiji) Vijay Singh	70-70-64-72=276	−4	405,000
5	(United States) David Toms	73-72-67-65=277	−3	235,000
T6	(South Korea) K. J. Choi	67-71-68-73=279	−1	182,500
T6	(Republic of Ireland) Pádraig Harrington	71-73-69-66=279	−1	182,500
T8	(England) Paul Casey	73-71-66-71=281	+1	137,500
T8	(South Africa) Retief Goosen	73-69-67-72=281	+1	137,500
T10	(United States) Fred Couples	71-73-70-68=282	+2	111,250
T10	(Spain) Ignacio Garrido	68-71-69-74=282	+2	111,250
