= Playoff (golf) =

Means of breaking a tie in a golf tournament

A playoff in the sport of golf is how a tie is resolved at the end of a match or competition, often by means of an extra hole, or holes, being played until a winner emerges.

Playoffs are a standard occurrence in match play and professional stroke play tournaments to determine a winner in the event of a tie at the completion of normal play. There are two types of playoff that are used: aggregate playoff and sudden death. They are usually played directly after completion of the final round, with the exception of 18 hole aggregate playoffs which may be held the following day.

In many amateur stroke play tournaments, and particularly in club competitions, competitors may not be readily available and other methods are used to determine the winner, such as scorecard count-back, whereby the player with the lowest cumulative score over the last 18, 9, 6, 3 or 1 hole(s) is declared the winner.

In 1976, the Pepsi-Wilson Tournament on the Japan Golf Tour, set a record for the longest sudden-death playoff on any men's professional tour. It took Peter Thomson 14 holes to defeat Graham Marsh, Brian Jones and Shozo Miyamoto. This record still stands.

== Sudden death ==
Sudden death is the most common playoff format in stroke play tournaments and even more so in match play tournaments. The tied participants play one extra hole at a time, with those still tied for the lowest score moving on to the next hole until a winner has been determined. All regular PGA Tour and European Tour tournaments use this system (except for The Players Championship starting in 2014), as does the Masters Tournament. The PGA Championship also used the sudden death format from 1977 to 1999. A player who wins in matchplay after n playoff holes is said to have won "at the (18+n)th hole" — or "(36+n)th hole" in the increasingly rare case of a 36-hole match.

Many supporters, including veteran golfer Kenny Perry, support this type of play, feeling that it is best to let momentum decide the match. Tiger Woods, when interviewed immediately after his 2008 U.S. Open victory at Torrey Pines, stated that "as a player who's playing well, you want to go more holes. The better player usually wins in more holes. That's how I've always approached it. The more holes you give me, if I'm playing well, I want more holes. Not just one hole, or even three." Others, such as professional golfer Chris DiMarco, claim that it is not fair to gruel through 72 holes and lose the tournament on one bad swing in sudden death.

== Aggregate playoff ==
The aggregate playoff is the oldest playoff format in strokeplay tournaments, with the lowest cumulative score in a series of holes, most commonly three, four, or eighteen holes. This is widely considered to be the fairest way of deciding a winner, as one bad shot does not eliminate all chances of winning, and is used in the four men's major championships. One flaw of this system is shorter variants, used in two majors and The Players Championship, held immediately after the tournament, take longer to complete than sudden death, meaning that a tournament may risk not being over before sunset. In contrast, a full 18-hole playoff is held the next day. Should there still be a tie after the set number of holes, then sudden death is normally played.

The four men's majors originally used an 18-hole (or 36-hole) format. The men's U.S. Open changed in 2018 to a two-hole aggregate playoff. The Open Championship used this format until 1985, when it was reduced to four holes. The three-hole format is used for the men's PGA Championship (originally 18 holes, changed to sudden death in 1977, and adopted the three hole in 2000), The Players Championship, and the other three USGA-sanctioned tournaments for professionals, the U.S. Women's Open, U.S. Senior Open (both were 18-hole playoffs before shortened to three in 2007, and two in 2018), and the U.S. Senior Women's Open. The Masters Tournament used the 18-hole format until 1976 (the first sudden-death playoff was in 1979). The first playoff in The Masters in 1935 was contested over 36 holes, when Gene Sarazen overcame Craig Wood.

The Open Championship was the first major tournament to adopt the shortened aggregate playoff system when a 4-hole playoff was introduced in 1985. However it was not invoked until Mark Calcavecchia, Greg Norman and Wayne Grady tied at Royal Troon in 1989. Calcavecchia came out on top to win his only major title. Since 2000, the PGA Championship has made use of a 3-hole playoff, having previously used sudden death. Three-hole playoffs were expected to be used in the 2016 Summer Olympics if there were a tie in medal positions, but were not necessary. The 2020 Summer Olympics tournament playoffs used sudden death to break medal ties.

== Playoff formats in professional golf ==
Type	Tournament	Playoff format (tiebreaker after 72 holes)
Men's major golf championships	Masters Tournament	Sudden death
Men's major golf championships	U.S. Open	Aggregate (2-hole), sudden death if still tied after aggregate
Men's major golf championships	PGA Championship	Aggregate (3-hole), sudden death if still tied after aggregate
Men's major golf championships	The Open Championship	Aggregate (3-hole), sudden death if still tied after aggregate
Men's: PGA Tour	The Players Championship	Aggregate (3-hole), sudden death if still tied after aggregate
Women's major golf championships	Chevron Championship	Sudden death
Women's major golf championships	The Evian Championship	Sudden death
Women's major golf championships	U.S. Women's Open	Aggregate (2-hole), sudden death if still tied after aggregate
Women's major golf championships	Women's PGA Championship	Aggregate (3-hole), sudden death if still tied after aggregate
Women's major golf championships	Women's British Open	Aggregate (3-hole), sudden death if still tied after aggregate
Men's: PGA Tour, European Tour	All other tournaments	Sudden death
Women's: LPGA Tour, Ladies European Tour	All other tournaments	Sudden death
