= Brett Wetterich =

American professional golfer (born 1973)

Personal information
- Full name: Brett Milton Wetterich
- Nationality: United States
- Born: August 9, 1973 (age 53) Cincinnati, Ohio, U.S.
- Height: 6 ft 1 in (1.85 m)
- Weight: 205 lb (93 kg; 14.6 st)
- Spouse: Erin Elizabeth Noel

Career
- Sport: Golf
- College: Wallace State Community College
- Turned professional: 1994
- Former tours: PGA Tour; Web.com Tour; Golden Bear Tour
- Professional wins: 4
- Highest ranking: 21 (March 25, 2007)

Number of wins by tour
- PGA Tour: 1
- Korn Ferry Tour: 3

Best results in major championships
- Masters Tournament: T37: 2007
- PGA Championship: T32: 2007
- U.S. Open: CUT: 1998, 2007
- The Open Championship: CUT: 2006, 2007

Brett Milton Wetterich (born August 9, 1973) is an American professional golfer.

== Early life ==
Wetterich was born in Cincinnati, Ohio. He attended Oak Hills High School and Wallace State Community College.

== Professional career ==
In 1994, Wetterich turned professional. Wetterich was a PGA Tour rookie in 2000, but injury truncated his season and he spent the next few seasons playing mainly on the Nationwide Tour, where he won in 2003 and 2004. He returned to the PGA Tour in 2005 and in 2006, and he won the EDS Byron Nelson Championship. This win helped him secure a place in the 2006 U.S. Ryder Cup team by finishing tenth on the points list. He became the first (and as of 2018, the only) player to go from Q-School to making the Ryder Cup team in the following year. He also finished tenth on the 2006 year-end PGA Tour money list with earnings of $3,023,185.

Wetterich led the 2007 Masters Tournament at the mid-way point, but collapsed on Saturday, shooting an 83, the highest score posted by any weekend leader in the storied tournament's history. He finished the tournament T37.

Shoulder injuries cut Wetterich's 2008 season short, kept him off the course in 2009, and cost him significant Tour status in 2010 after he failed to satisfy his medical exemption. He finished 156th on the money list and was demoted to the Past Champions category, among the lowest priority rankings on Tour. He won his third event on the Nationwide Tour in 2011, but finished 29th on the money list, four places short of a PGA Tour card. Wetterich has not played a full PGA Tour season since 2010.

Wetterich has been featured in the top 25 of the Official World Golf Ranking, reaching a career high of 21st in 2007.

== Professional wins (4) ==
=== PGA Tour wins (1) ===
No.	Date	Tournament	Winning score	Margin of victory	Runner-up
1	May 14, 2006	EDS Byron Nelson Championship	−12 (66-64-70-68=268)	1 stroke	(South Africa) Trevor Immelman

=== Nationwide Tour wins (3) ===
No.	Date	Tournament	Winning score	Margin of victory	Runner(s)-up
1	Mar 30, 2003	Chitimacha Louisiana Open	−24 (62-68-64-70=264)	3 strokes	(United States) Ken Duke
2	Aug 29, 2004	Envirocare Utah Classic	−16 (67-69-65-71=272)	1 stroke	(Japan) Ryuji Imada, (United States) Franklin Langham
3	Mar 27, 2011	Chitimacha Louisiana Open (2)	−13 (67-65-70-69=271)	1 stroke	(Colombia) Andrés Echavarría (a)

== Results in major championships ==
Tournament	1998	1999	2000	2001	2002	2003	2004	2005	2006	2007	2008
Masters Tournament										T37	CUT
U.S. Open	CUT									CUT	
The Open Championship									CUT	CUT	
PGA Championship									CUT	T32	

Did not play

CUT = missed the half-way cut
"T" = tied

== Results in The Players Championship ==
Tournament	2007	2008
The Players Championship	T52	CUT

CUT = missed the halfway cut
"T" indicates a tie for a place

== Results in World Golf Championships ==
Tournament	2006	2007	2008
Match Play		R64	
Championship	T6	2	T61
Invitational	T36	T30	

Top 10
Did not play

QF, R16, R32, R64 = Round in which player lost in match play
"T" = Tied

== U.S. national team appearances ==
- Ryder Cup: 2006

== See also ==
- 1999 PGA Tour Qualifying School graduates
- 2001 PGA Tour Qualifying School graduates
- 2004 Nationwide Tour graduates
- 2005 PGA Tour Qualifying School graduates
