= List of tournament performances by Tiger Woods =

This page details tournament performances pertaining to Tiger Woods.

For a list of his career achievements see List of career achievements by Tiger Woods. All tournaments are PGA Tour tournaments unless otherwise stated.

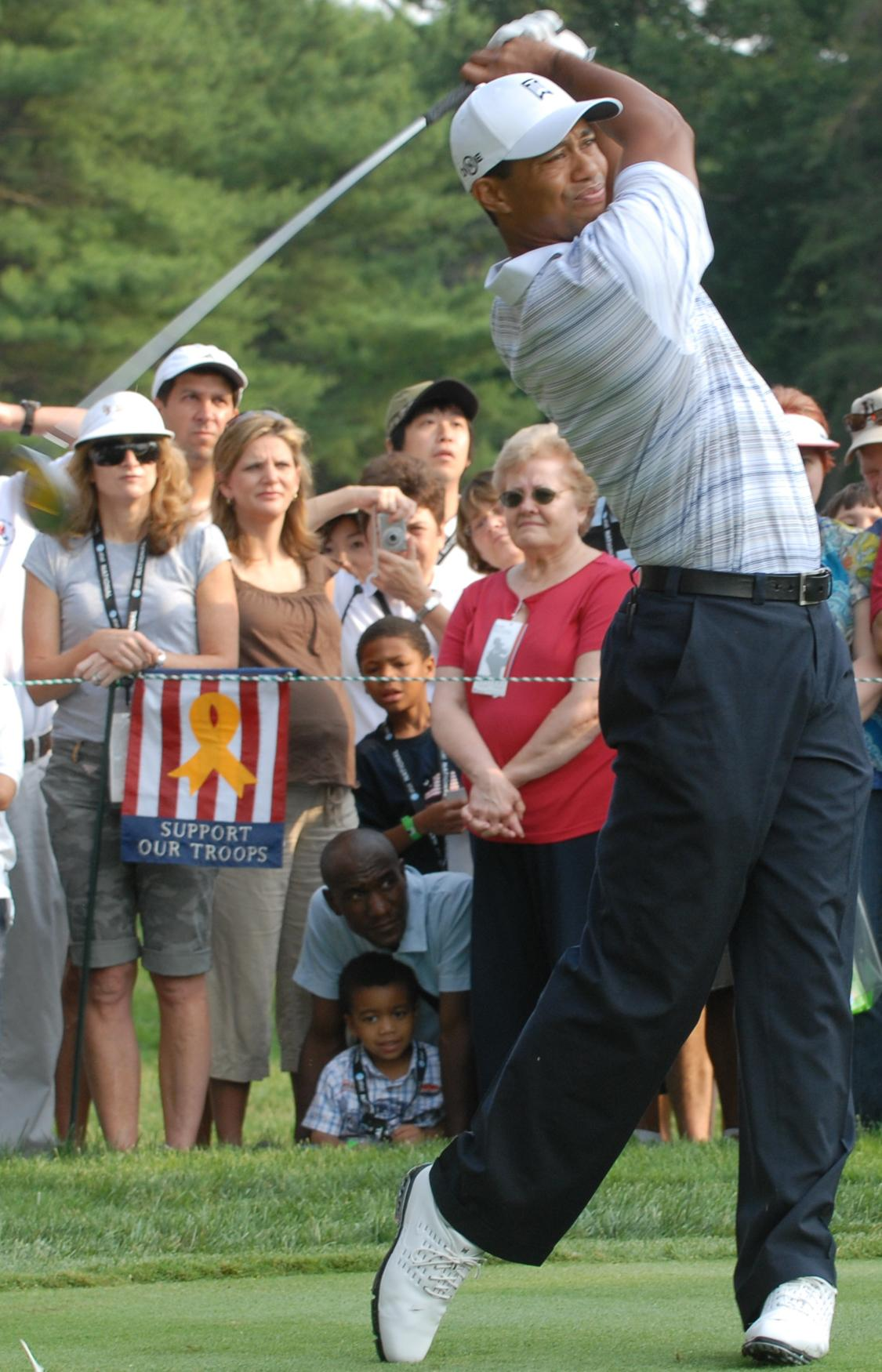

Legend
Major championships
Players Championships
World Golf Championships
(founded in 1999)
FedEx Cup Playoff event
(founded in 2007)
Other PGA Tour
Wins in **bold**

== 1992 ==
=== Tournaments ===
Tournament	Round 1	Round 2	Round 3	Round 4	Score	To par	Place	Money ($)
Nissan Los Angeles Open	72	75			147	+5	CUT	–

=== Summary ===
	Events	Cuts made	PGA Tour wins	Majors	2nd	3rd	Top 10	Top 25	Earnings ($)
1992	1	0	0	0	0	0	0	0	–
**Career**	**1**	**0**	**0**	**0**	**0**	**0**	**0**	**0**	−

=== Notes ===
- Participated in his first PGA Tour event at the Nissan Los Angeles Open. Woods did not make the cut, which was at 1 under-par. He played on February 27 and February 28, and was 16 years and 59 days old when he first played on the PGA Tour.

== 1993 ==
=== Tournaments ===
Tournament	Round 1	Round 2	Round 3	Round 4	Score	To par	Place	Money ($)
Nissan Los Angeles Open	74	78			152	+10	CUT	–
Honda Classic	72	78			150	+6	CUT	–
GTE Byron Nelson Classic	77	72			149	+9	CUT	–

=== Summary ===
	Events	Cuts made	PGA Tour wins	Majors	2nd	3rd	Top 10	Top 25	Earnings ($)
1993	3	0	0	0	0	0	0	0	–
**Career**	**4**	**0**	**0**	**0**	**0**	**0**	**0**	**0**	−

== 1994 ==
=== Tournaments ===
Tournament	Round 1	Round 2	Round 3	Round 4	Score	To par	Place	Money ($)
Nestle Invitational	80	77			157	+13	CUT	–
Buick Classic	75	70			145	+3	CUT	–
Motorola Western Open	74	75			149	+5	CUT	–

=== Summary ===
	Events	Cuts made	PGA Tour wins	Majors	2nd	3rd	Top 10	Top 25	Earnings ($)
1994	3	0	0	0	0	0	0	0	–
**Career**	**7**	**0**	**0**	**0**	**0**	**0**	**0**	**0**	−

=== Notes ===
- Shot his first under-par round in a PGA Tour event at the Buick Classic. Woods shot a 70 (−1).

== 1995 ==
=== Tournaments ===
Tournament	Round 1	Round 2	Round 3	Round 4	Score	To par	Place	Money ($)
Masters Tournament	72	72	77	72	293	+5	T41	–
U.S. Open	74				74	+4	WD	–
Motorola Western Open	74	71	77	69	291	+3	T57	–
The Open Championship	74	71	72	78	295	+7	T68	–

=== Summary ===
	Events	Cuts made	PGA Tour wins	Majors	2nd	3rd	Top 10	Top 25	Earnings ($)
1995	4	3	0	0	0	0	0	0	–
**Career**	**11**	**3**	**0**	**0**	**0**	**0**	**0**	**0**	−

=== Notes ===
- Made his first cut in a PGA Tour event at The Masters. Woods was the highest finishing amateur at the event. He was also the highest finishing amateur at the Motorola Western Open.

== 1996 ==
=== Tournaments ===
Tournament	Round 1	Round 2	Round 3	Round 4/5	Score	To par	Place	Money ($)
Masters Tournament	75	75			150	+6	CUT	–
U.S. Open	76	69	77	72	294	+14	T82	–
The Open Championship	75	66	70	70	281	−3	T22	–
Greater Milwaukee Open	67	69	73	68	277	−7	T60	2,544.00
Bell Canadian Open	70	70	68		208	−8	11	37,500.00
Quad City Classic	69	64	67	72	272	−8	T5	42,150.00
B.C. Open	68	66	66		200	−13	T3	58,000.00
**Las Vegas Invitational**	**70**	**63**	**68**	**67/64**	**332**	**−27**	**1**	**297,000.00**
LaCantera Texas Open	69	68	73	67	277	−11	3	81,600.00
**Walt Disney World/Oldsmobile Classic**	**69**	**63**	**69**	**66**	**267**	**−21**	**1**	**216,000.00**
The Tour Championship	70	78	72	68	288	+8	T21	55,800.00

=== Summary ===
	Events	Cuts made	PGA Tour wins	Majors	2nd	3rd	Top 10	Top 25	Earnings ($)
1996	11	10	2	0	0	2	5	8	790,594
**Career**	**22**	**13**	**2**	**0**	**0**	**2**	**5**	**8**	**790,594**

=== Notes ===
- Woods debuted as a professional at the Greater Milwaukee Open on September 1, 1996. He did not earn money before then due to his amateur status.
- Highest finishing amateur at The Open Championship. This was also the last event Woods played in as an amateur.
- Turned professional in August 1996. In his first event as a professional, Woods finished tied for 60th at the Greater Milwaukee Open.
- Won his first title on the PGA Tour at the Las Vegas Invitational which was a five-round event. Woods won the Walt Disney World/Oldsmobile Classic two weeks later which is the first four-round event that he won.

== 1997 ==
=== Tournaments ===
Tournament	Round 1	Round 2	Round 3	Round 4/5	Score	To par	Place	Money ($)
**Mercedes Championships**	**70**	**67**	**65**		**202**	**−14**	**1**	**216,000.00**
Phoenix Open	68	68	67	72	275	−9	T18	20,250.00
AT&T Pebble Beach National Pro-Am	70	72	63	64	269	−19	T2	167,200.00
Nissan Open	70	70	72	69	281	−3	T20	14,600.00
Bay Hill Invitational	68	71	71	68	278	−10	T9	42,000.00
The Players Championship	71	73	72	73	289	+1	T31	20,300.00
**Masters Tournament**	**70**	**66**	**65**	**69**	**270**	**−18**	**1**	**486,000.00**
**GTE Byron Nelson Classic**	**64**	**64**	**67**	**68**	**263**	**−17**	**1**	**324,000.00**
MasterCard Colonial	67	65	64	72	268	−12	T4	70,400.00
Memorial Tournament	72	75	74		221	+5	T67	3,800.00
U.S. Open	74	67	73	72	286	+6	T19	31,915.60
Buick Classic	72	72	71	72	287	+3	T43	4,567.50
**Motorola Western Open**	**67**	**72**	**68**	**68**	**275**	**−13**	**1**	**360,000.00**
The Open Championship	72	74	64	74	284	E	T24	17,362.37
Buick Open	72	68	70	68	278	−10	T8	43,500.00
PGA Championship	70	70	71	75	286	+6	T29	13,625.00
NEC World Series of Golf	67	72	69	70	278	−2	T3	114,400.00
Bell Canadian Open	70	76			146	+6	CUT	0.00
Walt Disney World/Oldsmobile Classic	66	71	70	71	278	−10	T26	10,650.00
Las Vegas Invitational	68	64	77	71/75	355	−5	T36	8,662.50
The Tour Championship	69	68	75	69	281	−3	T12	97,600.00

=== Summary ===
	Events	Cuts made	PGA Tour wins	Majors	2nd	3rd	Top 10	Top 25	Earnings ($)
1997	21	20	4	1	1	1	9	14	2,066,833
**Career**	**43**	**33**	**6**	**1**	**1**	**3**	**14**	**22**	**2,857,427**

=== Notes ===
- Won his first major at the 1997 Masters. He won at the age of 21 years and 104 days old making him the youngest Masters winner ever. He also set the scoring record in the Masters by shooting a 270 (−18).

== 1998 ==
=== Tournaments ===
Tournament	Round 1	Round 2	Round 3	Round 4	Score	To par	Place	Money ($)
Mercedes Championships	72	67	69	64	272	−16	T2	149,600.00
Buick Invitational	71	66	68		205	−11	T3	109,200.00
Nissan Open	68	73	65	66	272	−12	2	226,800.00
Doral-Ryder Open	70	69	71	73	283	−5	T9	48,000.00
Bay Hill Invitational	64	70	73	77	284	−4	T13	37,500.00
The Players Championship	72	73	73	72	290	+2	T35	18,885.72
Masters Tournament	71	72	72	70	285	−3	T8	89,600.00
**BellSouth Classic**	**69**	**67**	**63**	**72**	**271**	**−17**	**1**	**324,000.00**
GTE Byron Nelson Classic	65	71	69	67	272	−8	T12	52,500.00
Memorial Tournament	70	74	71	73	288	E	T51	5,148.00
U.S. Open	74	72	71	73	290	+10	T18	41,833.00
Motorola Western Open	76	67	69	69	281	−7	T9	49,225.00
The Open Championship	65	73	77	66	281	+1	3	222,075.00
Buick Open	71	67	69	68	275	−13	T4	79,200.00
PGA Championship	66	72	70	71	279	−1	T10	69,000.00
AT&T Pebble Beach National Pro-Am	76	72			148	+4	WD	0.00
Sprint International	14	3	14	7	38	–	4	96,000.00
NEC World Series of Golf	67	68	70	70	275	−5	T5	85,500.00
Walt Disney World/Oldsmobile Classic	66	73	68	70	277	−11	T7	60,250.00
The Tour Championship	75	76	69	69	289	+9	20	76,800.00

=== Summary ===
	Events	Cuts made	PGA Tour wins	Majors	2nd	3rd	Top 10	Top 25	Earnings ($)
1998	20	19	1	0	2	2	13	17	1,841,117
**Career**	**63**	**52**	**7**	**1**	**3**	**5**	**27**	**39**	**4,698,544**

== 1999 ==
=== Tournaments ===
Tournament	Round 1	Round 2	Round 3	Round 4	Score	To par	Place	Money ($)
Mercedes Championships	69	69	67	72	277	−15	T5	94,900.00
Phoenix Open	71	67	70	68	276	−8	3	204,000.00
AT&T Pebble Beach National Pro-Am	72	69	78		219	+3	T53	6,220.30
**Buick Invitational**	**68**	**71**	**62**	**65**	**266**	**−22**	**1**	**486,000.00**
Nissan Open	69	68	65	70	272	−12	T2	209,066.67
WGC-Andersen Consulting Match Play Championship	see below						T5	150,000.00
Bay Hill Invitational	74	72	72	72	290	+2	T56	5,625.00
The Players Championship	70	71	75	75	291	+3	T10	107,142.85
Masters Tournament	72	72	70	75	289	+1	T18	52,160.00
MCI Classic	70	70	69	71	280	−4	T18	28,333.34
GTE Byron Nelson Classic	61	67	74	69	271	−9	T7	96,750.00
**Memorial Tournament**	**68**	**66**	**70**	**69**	**273**	**−15**	**1**	**459,000.00**
U.S. Open	68	71	72	70	281	+1	T3	196,791.50
**Motorola Western Open**	**68**	**66**	**68**	**71**	**273**	**−15**	**1**	**450,000.00**
The Open Championship	74	72	74	74	294	+10	T7	78,115.00
**PGA Championship**	**70**	**67**	**68**	**72**	**277**	**−11**	**1**	**630,000.00**
Sprint International	7	9	2		18	–	T37	12,480.00
**WGC-NEC Invitational**	**66**	**71**	**62**	**71**	**270**	**−10**	**1**	**1,000,000.00**
**National Car Rental Golf Classic Disney**	**66**	**66**	**66**	**73**	**271**	**−17**	**1**	**450,000.00**
**The Tour Championship**	**67**	**66**	**67**	**69**	**269**	**−15**	**1**	**900,000.00**
**WGC-American Express Championship**	**71**	**69**	**70**	**68**	**278**	**−6**	**1**	**1,000,000.00**

=== Summary ===
	Events	Cuts made	PGA Tour wins	Majors	2nd	3rd	Top 10	Top 25	Earnings ($)
1999	21	21	8	1	1	2	16	18	6,616,585
**Career**	**84**	**73**	**15**	**2**	**4**	**7**	**43**	**57**	**11,315,129**

== 2000 ==
=== Tournaments ===
Tournament	Round 1	Round 2	Round 3	Round 4	Score	To par	Place	Money ($)
**Mercedes Championships**	**71**	**66**	**71**	**68**	**276**	**−16**	**1**	**522,000.00**
**AT&T Pebble Beach National Pro-Am**	**68**	**73**	**68**	**64**	**273**	**−15**	**1**	**720,000.00**
Buick Invitational	71	68	67	68	274	−14	T2	264,000.00
Nissan Open	68	70	69	72	279	−5	T18	37,731.43
WGC-Andersen Consulting Match Play Championship	see below						2	500,000.00
**Bay Hill Invitational**	**69**	**64**	**67**	**70**	**270**	**−18**	**1**	**540,000.00**
The Players Championship	71	71	66	71	279	−9	2	648,000.00
Masters Tournament	75	72	68	69	284	−4	5	184,000.00
GTE Byron Nelson Classic	73	67	67	63	270	−10	T4	176,000.00
**Memorial Tournament**	**71**	**63**	**65**	**70**	**269**	**−19**	**1**	**558,000.00**
**U.S. Open**	**65**	**69**	**71**	**67**	**272**	**−12**	**1**	**800,000.00**
Advil Western Open	70	69	70	72	281	−7	T23	26,700.00
**The Open Championship**	**67**	**66**	**67**	**69**	**269**	**−19**	**1**	**759,150.00**
Buick Open	70	70	67	68	275	−13	T11	57,240.00
**PGA Championship**	**66**	**67**	**70**	**67**	**270**	**−18**	**1**	**900,000.00**
**WGC-NEC Invitational**	**64**	**61**	**67**	**67**	**259**	**−21**	**1**	**1,000,000.00**
**Bell Canadian Open**	**72**	**65**	**64**	**65**	**266**	**−22**	**1**	**594,000.00**
National Car Rental Golf Classic Disney	63	67	66	69	265	−23	3	204,000.00
The Tour Championship	68	66	66	69	269	−11	2	540,000.00
WGC-American Express Championship	71	69	69	72	281	−7	T5	157,500.00

=== Summary ===
	Events	Cuts made	PGA Tour wins	Majors	2nd	3rd	Top 10	Top 25	Earnings ($)
2000	20	20	9	3	4	1	17	20	9,188,321
**Career**	**104**	**93**	**24**	**5**	**8**	**8**	**60**	**77**	**20,503,450**

== 2001 ==
=== Tournaments ===
Tournament	Round 1	Round 2	Round 3	Round 4	Score	To par	Place	Money ($)
Mercedes Championships	70	73	68	69	280	−12	T8	99,000.00
Phoenix Open	65	73	68	65	271	−13	T5	152,000.00
AT&T Pebble Beach National Pro-Am	66	73	69	72	280	−8	T13	68,571.43
Buick Invitational	70	67	67	67	271	−17	4	168,000.00
Nissan Open	71	68	69	71	279	−5	T13	58,285.71
**Bay Hill Invitational**	**71**	**67**	**66**	**69**	**273**	**−15**	**1**	**630,000.00**
**The Players Championship**	**72**	**69**	**66**	**67**	**274**	**−14**	**1**	**1,080,000.00**
**Masters Tournament**	**70**	**66**	**68**	**68**	**272**	**−16**	**1**	**1,008,000.00**
Verizon Byron Nelson Classic	66	68	69	63	266	−14	T3	234,000.00
**Memorial Tournament**	**68**	**69**	**68**	**66**	**271**	**−17**	**1**	**738,000.00**
U.S. Open	74	71	69	69	283	+3	T12	91,734.00
Buick Classic	75	66	68	71	280	−4	T16	56,000.00
Advil Western Open	73	68	68	71	280	−8	T20	33,381.82
The Open Championship	71	68	73	71	283	−1	T25	39,338.75
PGA Championship	73	67	69	70	279	−1	T29	29,437.50
**WGC-NEC Invitational**	**66**	**67**	**66**	**69**	**268**	**−12**	**1**	**1,000,000.00**
Bell Canadian Open	65	73	69	69	276	−4	T23	32,028.57
National Car Rental Golf Classic Disney	69	67	67	69	272	−16	T16	51,000.00
The Tour Championship	70	67	69	70	276	−8	T13	119,000.00

=== Summary ===
	Events	Cuts made	PGA Tour wins	Majors	2nd	3rd	Top 10	Top 25	Earnings ($)
2001	19	19	5	1	0	1	9	18	5,687,777
**Career**	**123**	**112**	**29**	**6**	**8**	**9**	**69**	**95**	**26,191,227**

== 2002 ==
=== Tournaments ===
Tournament	Round 1	Round 2	Round 3	Round 4	Score	To par	Place	Money ($)
Mercedes Championships	68	74	74	65	281	−11	T10	105,000.00
AT&T Pebble Beach National Pro-Am	70	73	71	68	282	−6	T12	84,000.00
Buick Invitational	66	77	69	66	278	−10	T5	131,400.00
WGC-Accenture Match Play Championship	see below						T33	27,500.00
Genuity Championship	67	70	70	66	273	−15	2	507,600.00
**Bay Hill Invitational**	**67**	**65**	**74**	**69**	**275**	**−13**	**1**	**720,000.00**
The Players Championship	71	72	70	74	287	−1	T14	102,000.00
**Masters Tournament**	**70**	**69**	**66**	**71**	**276**	**−12**	**1**	**1,008,000.00**
Verizon Byron Nelson Classic	71	65	69	65	270	−10	3	326,400.00
Memorial Tournament	74	70	72	66	282	−6	T22	43,200.00
**U.S. Open**	**67**	**68**	**70**	**72**	**277**	**−3**	**1**	**1,000,000.00**
The Open Championship	70	68	81	65	284	E	T28	37,924.80
**Buick Open**	**67**	**63**	**71**	**70**	**271**	**−17**	**1**	**594,000.00**
PGA Championship	71	69	72	67	279	−9	2	594,000.00
WGC-NEC Invitational	68	70	67	68	273	−11	4	215,000.00
**WGC-American Express Championship**	**65**	**65**	**67**	**66**	**263**	**−25**	**1**	**1,000,000.00**
Disney Golf Classic	66	69	67	63	265	−23	3	251,600.00
The Tour Championship	71	68	67	70	276	−4	T7	165,000.00

=== Summary ===
	Events	Cuts made	PGA Tour wins	Majors	2nd	3rd	Top 10	Top 25	Earnings ($)
2002	18	18	5	2	2	2	13	16	6,912,625
**Career**	**141**	**130**	**34**	**8**	**10**	**11**	**82**	**111**	**33,103,852**

== 2003 ==
=== Tournaments ===
Tournament	Round 1	Round 2	Round 3	Round 4	Score	To par	Place	Money ($)
**Buick Invitational**	**70**	**66**	**68**	**68**	**272**	**−16**	**1**	**810,000.00**
Nissan Open	72	68	73	65	278	−6	T5	171,000.00
**WGC-Accenture Match Play Championship**	**see below**						**1**	**1,050,000.00**
**Bay Hill Invitational**	**70**	**65**	**66**	**68**	**269**	**−19**	**1**	**810,000.00**
The Players Championship	72	70	68	72	282	−6	T11	133,250.00
Masters Tournament	76	73	66	75	290	+2	T15	93,000.00
Memorial Tournament	67	71	76	65	279	−9	T4	220,000.00
U.S. Open	70	66	75	72	283	+3	T20	64,170.00
Buick Classic	67	69	71	70	277	−7	T13	91,000.00
**Western Open**	**63**	**70**	**65**	**69**	**267**	**−21**	**1**	**810,000.00**
The Open Championship	73	72	69	71	285	+1	T4	294,076.00
Buick Open	69	65	69	66	269	−19	T2	264,000.00
PGA Championship	74	72	73	73	292	+12	T39	22,000.00
WGC-NEC Invitational	65	72	67	70	274	−6	T4	235,000.00
Deutsche Bank Championship	70	69	67	67	273	−11	T7	161,250.00
**WGC-American Express Championship**	**67**	**66**	**69**	**72**	**274**	**−6**	**1**	**1,050,000.00**
FUNAI Classic at the Walt Disney World Resort	66	67	71	65	269	−19	T2	298,666.67
The Tour Championship	70	70	71	74	285	+1	26	96,000.00

=== Summary ===
	Events	Cuts made	PGA Tour wins	Majors	2nd	3rd	Top 10	Top 25	Earnings ($)
2003	18	18	5	0	2	0	12	16	6,673,413
**Career**	**159**	**148**	**39**	**8**	**12**	**11**	**94**	**127**	**39,777,265**

== 2004 ==
=== Tournaments ===
Tournament	Round 1	Round 2	Round 3	Round 4	Score	To par	Place	Money ($)
Mercedes Championships	71	70	65	71	277	−15	T4	275,000.00
Buick Invitational	71	68	72	69	280	−8	T10	106,400.00
Nissan Open	72	66	72	64	274	−10	T7	149,600.00
**WGC-Accenture Match Play Championship**	**see below**						**1**	**1,200,000.00**
Bay Hill Invitational	67	74	74	73	288	E	T46	12,850.00
The Players Championship	75	69	68	73	285	−3	T16	116,000.00
Masters Tournament	75	69	75	71	290	+2	T22	70,200.00
Wachovia Championship	69	66	75	68	278	−10	T3	324,800.00
EDS Byron Nelson Championship	65	67	70	69	271	−9	T4	239,733.33
Memorial Tournament	72	68	67	69	276	−12	3	357,000.00
U.S. Open	72	69	73	76	290	+10	T17	98,477.00
Cialis Western Open	70	73	65	71	279	−5	T7	144,600.00
The Open Championship	70	71	68	72	281	−3	T9	167,597.70
Buick Open	67	68	66	66	267	−21	T3	261,000.00
PGA Championship	75	69	69	73	286	−2	T24	46,714.28
WGC-NEC Invitational	68	66	70	69	273	−7	T2	552,500.00
Deutsche Bank Championship	65	68	69	69	271	−13	T2	440,000.00
WGC-American Express Championship	68	70	70	70	278	−10	9	155,000.00
The Tour Championship	72	64	65	72	273	−7	2	648,000.00

=== Summary ===
	Events	Cuts made	PGA Tour wins	Majors	2nd	3rd	Top 10	Top 25	Earnings ($)
2004	19	19	1	0	3	3	14	18	5,365,472
**Career**	**178**	**167**	**40**	**8**	**15**	**14**	**108**	**145**	**45,142,737**

== 2005 ==
=== Tournaments ===
Tournament	Round 1	Round 2	Round 3	Round 4	Score	To par	Place	Money ($)
Mercedes Championships	68	68	69	68	273	−19	T3	350,000.00
**Buick Invitational**	**69**	**63**	**72**	**68**	**272**	**−16**	**1**	**864,000.00**
Nissan Open	67	70			137	−5	T13	77,333.33
WGC-Accenture Match Play Championship	see below						T17	85,000.00
**Ford Championship at Doral**	**65**	**70**	**63**	**66**	**264**	**−24**	**1**	**990,000.00**
Bay Hill Invitational	71	70	74	72	287	−1	T23	42,142.86
The Players Championship	70	73	75	75	293	+5	T53	18,613.33
**Masters Tournament**	**74**	**66**	**65**	**71**	**276**	**−12**	**1**	**1,260,000.00**
Wachovia Championship	70	72	73	71	286	−2	T11	127,200.00
EDS Byron Nelson Championship	69	72			141	+1	CUT	0.00
Memorial Tournament	69	68	71	68	276	−12	T3	286,000.00
U.S. Open	70	71	72	69	282	+2	2	700,000.00
Cialis Western Open	73	66	67	66	272	−12	2	540,000.00
**The Open Championship**	**66**	**67**	**71**	**70**	**274**	**−14**	**1**	**1,261,584.00**
Buick Open	71	61	70	66	268	−20	T2	404,800.00
PGA Championship	75	69	66	68	278	−2	T4	286,000.00
**WGC-NEC Invitational**	**66**	**70**	**67**	**71**	**274**	**−6**	**1**	**1,300,000.00**
Deutsche Bank Championship	65	73	72	71	281	−3	T40	20,350.00
**WGC-American Express Championship**	**67**	**68**	**68**	**67**	**270**	**−10**	**1**	**1,300,000.00**
FUNAI Classic at the Walt Disney World Resort	68	73			141	−3	CUT	0.00
The Tour Championship	66	67	67	69	269	−11	2	715,000.00

=== Summary ===
	Events	Cuts made	PGA Tour wins	Majors	2nd	3rd	Top 10	Top 25	Earnings ($)
2005	21	19	6	2	4	2	13	17	10,628,024
**Career**	**199**	**186**	**46**	**10**	**19**	**16**	**121**	**162**	**55,770,761**

== 2006 ==
=== Tournaments ===
Tournament	Round 1	Round 2	Round 3	Round 4	Score	To par	Place	Money ($)
**Buick Invitational**	**71**	**68**	**67**	**72**	**278**	**−10**	**1**	**918,000.00**
Nissan Open	69	74			143	+1	WD	0.00
WGC-Accenture Match Play Championship	see below						T9	125,000.00
**Ford Championship at Doral**	**64**	**67**	**68**	**69**	**268**	**−20**	**1**	**990,000.00**
Bay Hill Invitational	70	71	71	72	284	−4	T20	59,583.34
The Players Championship	72	69	73	75	289	+1	T22	76,800.00
Masters Tournament	72	71	71	70	284	−4	T3	315,700.00
U.S. Open	76	76			152	+12	CUT	0.00
Cialis Western Open	72	67	66	68	273	−11	T2	440,000.00
**The Open Championship**	**67**	**65**	**71**	**67**	**270**	**−18**	**1**	**1,338,480.00**
**Buick Open**	**66**	**66**	**66**	**66**	**264**	**−24**	**1**	**864,000.00**
**PGA Championship**	**69**	**68**	**65**	**68**	**270**	**−18**	**1**	**1,224,000.00**
**WGC-Bridgestone Invitational**	**67**	**64**	**71**	**68**	**270**	**−10**	**1**	**1,300,000.00**
**Deutsche Bank Championship**	**66**	**72**	**67**	**63**	**268**	**−16**	**1**	**990,000.00**
**WGC-American Express Championship**	**63**	**64**	**67**	**67**	**261**	**−23**	**1**	**1,300,000.00**

=== Summary ===
	Events	Cuts made	PGA Tour wins	Majors	2nd	3rd	Top 10	Top 25	Earnings ($)
2006	15	14	8	2	1	1	11	13	9,941,563
**Career**	**214**	**200**	**54**	**12**	**20**	**17**	**132**	**175**	**65,712,324**

== 2007 ==
=== Tournaments ===
Tournament	Round 1	Round 2	Round 3	Round 4	Score	To par	Place	Money ($)
**Buick Invitational**	**66**	**72**	**69**	**66**	**273**	**−15**	**1**	**936,000.00**
WGC-Accenture Match Play Championship	see below						T9	130,000.00
Arnold Palmer Invitational	64	73	70	76	283	+3	T22	51,058.33
**WGC-CA Championship**	**71**	**66**	**68**	**73**	**278**	**−10**	**1**	**1,350,000.00**
Masters Tournament	73	74	72	72	291	+3	T2	541,333.00
**Wachovia Championship**	**70**	**68**	**68**	**69**	**275**	**−13**	**1**	**1,134,000.00**
The Players Championship	75	73	73	67	288	E	T37	38,700.00
Memorial Tournament	70	72	70	67	279	−9	T15	93,000.00
U.S. Open	71	74	69	72	286	+6	T2	611,336.00
AT&T National	73	66	69	70	278	−2	T6	208,500.00
The Open Championship	69	74	69	70	282	−2	T12	120,458.00
**WGC-Bridgestone Invitational**	**68**	**70**	**69**	**65**	**272**	**−8**	**1**	**1,350,000.00**
**PGA Championship**	**71**	**63**	**69**	**69**	**272**	**−8**	**1**	**1,260,000.00**
Deutsche Bank Championship	72	64	67	67	270	−14	T2	522,666.67
**BMW Championship**	**67**	**67**	**65**	**63**	**262**	**−22**	**1**	**1,260,000.00**
**The Tour Championship**	**64**	**63**	**64**	**66**	**257**	**−23**	**1**	**1,260,000.00**

=== Summary ===
	Events	Cuts made	PGA Tour wins	Majors	2nd	3rd	Top 10	Top 25	Earnings ($)
2007	16	16	7	1	3	0	12	15	10,867,052
**Career**	**230**	**216**	**61**	**13**	**23**	**17**	**144**	**190**	**76,579,376**

== 2008 ==
=== Tournaments ===
Tournament	Round 1	Round 2	Round 3	Round 4	Score	To par	Place	Money ($)
**Buick Invitational**	**67**	**65**	**66**	**71**	**269**	**−19**	**1**	**936,000.00**
**WGC-Accenture Match Play Championship**	**see below**						**1**	**1,350,000.00**
**Arnold Palmer Invitational**	**70**	**68**	**66**	**66**	**270**	**−10**	**1**	**1,044,000.00**
WGC-CA Championship	67	66	72	68	273	−15	5	285,000.00
Masters Tournament	72	71	68	72	283	−5	2	810,000.00
**U.S. Open**	**72**	**68**	**70**	**73**	**283**	**−1**	**1**	**1,350,000.00**

=== Summary ===
	Events	Cuts made	PGA Tour wins	Majors	2nd	3rd	Top 10	Top 25	Earnings ($)
2008	6	6	4	1	1	0	6	6	5,775,000
**Career**	**236**	**222**	**65**	**14**	**24**	**17**	**150**	**196**	**82,354,376**

== 2009 ==
=== Tournaments ===
Tournament	Round 1	Round 2	Round 3	Round 4	Score	To par	Place	Money ($)
WGC-Accenture Match Play Championship	see below						T17	95,000.00
WGC-CA Championship	71	70	68	68	277	−11	T9	142,500.00
**Arnold Palmer Invitational**	**68**	**69**	**71**	**67**	**275**	**−5**	**1**	**1,080,000.00**
Masters Tournament	70	72	70	68	280	−8	T6	242,813.00
Quail Hollow Championship	65	72	70	72	279	−9	4	312,000.00
The Players Championship	71	69	70	73	283	−5	8	294,500.00
**Memorial Tournament**	**69**	**74**	**68**	**65**	**276**	**−12**	**1**	**1,080,000.00**
U.S. Open	74	69	68	69	280	E	T6	233,350.00
**AT&T National**	**64**	**66**	**70**	**67**	**267**	**−13**	**1**	**1,080,000.00**
The Open Championship	71	74			145	+5	CUT	0.00
**Buick Open**	**71**	**63**	**65**	**69**	**268**	**−20**	**1**	**918,000.00**
**WGC-Bridgestone Invitational**	**68**	**70**	**65**	**65**	**268**	**−12**	**1**	**1,400,000.00**
PGA Championship	67	70	71	75	283	−5	2	810,000.00
The Barclays	70	72	67	67	276	−8	T2	495,000.00
Deutsche Bank Championship	70	67	72	63	272	−12	T11	165,000.00
**BMW Championship**	**68**	**67**	**62**	**68**	**265**	**−19**	**1**	**1,350,000.00**
The Tour Championship	67	68	69	70	274	−6	2	810,000.00

=== Summary ===
	Events	Cuts made	PGA Tour wins	Majors	2nd	3rd	Top 10	Top 25	Earnings ($)
2009	17	16	6	0	3	0	14	16	10,508,163
**Career**	**253**	**238**	**71**	**14**	**27**	**17**	**164**	**212**	**92,862,539**

== 2010 ==
=== Tournaments ===
Tournament	Round 1	Round 2	Round 3	Round 4	Score	To par	Place	Money ($)
Masters Tournament	68	70	70	69	277	−11	T4	330,000.00
Quail Hollow Championship	74	79			153	+9	CUT	0.00
The Players Championship	70	71	71		212	−4	WD*	0.00
Memorial Tournament	72	69	69	72	282	−6	T19	75300.00
U.S. Open	74	72	66	75	287	+3	T4	303,119.00
AT&T National	73	70	70	71	284	+4	T46	16,580.57
Open Championship	67	73	73	72	285	−3	T23	64,511.66
WGC-Bridgestone Invitational	74	72	75	77	298	+18	T78	35,875.00
PGA Championship	71	70	72	73	286	−2	T28	46,700.00
The Barclays	65	73	72	67	277	−7	T12	157,500.00
Deutsche Bank Championship	72	65	69	68	274	−10	T11	148,928.57
BMW Championship	73	72	68	70	283	−1	T15	116,250.00

=== Summary ===
	Events	Cuts made	PGA Tour wins	Majors	2nd	3rd	Top 10	Top 25	Earnings ($)
2010	12	11*	0	0	0	0	2	7	1,294,765
**Career**	**265**	**249**	**71**	**14**	**27**	**17**	**166**	**219**	**94,157,304**

*Because Woods withdrew from The Players Championship after having made the cut, it counts as a cut made.

== 2011 ==
=== Tournaments ===
Tournament	Round 1	Round 2	Round 3	Round 4	Score	To par	Place	Money ($)
Farmers Insurance Open	69	69	74	75	287	−1	T44	18,096.00
WGC-Accenture Match Play Championship	see below						T33	45,000.00
WGC-Cadillac Championship	70	74	70	66	280	−8	T10	129,000.00
Arnold Palmer Invitational	73	68	74	72	287	−1	T24	48,600.00
Masters Tournament	71	66	74	67	278	−10	T4	330,667.00
The Players Championship							WD	0.00
WGC-Bridgestone Invitational	68	71	72	70	281	+1	T37	58,500.00
PGA Championship	77	73			150	+10	CUT	0.00
Frys.com Open	73	68	68	68	277	−7	T30	30,375.00

=== Summary ===
	Events	Cuts made	PGA Tour wins	Majors	2nd	3rd	Top 10	Top 25	Earnings ($)
2011	9	7	0	0	0	0	2	3	660,238
**Career**	**274**	**256**	**71**	**14**	**27**	**17**	**168**	**222**	**94,817,542**

== 2012 ==
=== Tournaments ===
Tournament	Round 1	Round 2	Round 3	Round 4	Score	To par	Place	Money ($)
AT&T Pebble Beach National Pro-Am	68	68	67	75	278	−10	T15	102,400.00
WGC-Accenture Match Play Championship	see below						T17	95,000.00
The Honda Classic	71	68	69	62	270	−10	T2	501,600.00
WGC-Cadillac Championship	72	67	68		207	−9	WD	0.00
**Arnold Palmer Invitational**	**69**	**65**	**71**	**70**	**275**	**−13**	**1**	**1,080,000.00**
Masters Tournament	72	75	72	74	293	+5	T40	32,000.00
Wells Fargo Championship	71	73			144	E	CUT	0.00
The Players Championship	74	68	72	73	287	−1	T40	37,050.00
**Memorial Tournament**	**70**	**69**	**73**	**67**	**279**	**−9**	**1**	**1,116,000.00**
U.S. Open	69	70	75	73	287	+7	T21	86,348.00
**AT&T National**	**72**	**68**	**67**	**69**	**276**	**−8**	**1**	**1,170,000.00**
Greenbrier Classic	71	69			140	E	CUT	0.00
The Open Championship	67	67	70	73	277	−3	T3	464,724.75
WGC-Bridgestone Invitational	70	72	68	66	276	−4	T8	128,750
PGA Championship	69	71	74	72	286	−2	T11	143,285.71
The Barclays	68	69	72	76	285	+1	T38	32,000.00
Deutsche Bank Championship	64	68	68	66	266	−18	3	544,000.00
BMW Championship	65	67	71	68	271	−17	T4	352,000.00
The Tour Championship	66	73	67	72	278	−2	T8	248,000.00

=== Summary ===
	Events	Cuts made	PGA Tour wins	Majors	2nd	3rd	Top 10	Top 25	Earnings ($)
2012	19	17	3	0	1	2	9	13	6,133,158
**Career**	**293**	**273**	**74**	**14**	**28**	**19**	**177**	**235**	**100,950,700**

== 2013 ==
=== Tournaments ===
Tournament	Round 1	Round 2	Round 3	Round 4	Score	To par	Place	Money ($)
**Farmers Insurance Open**	**68**	**65**	**69**	**72**	**274**	**−14**	**1**	**1,098,000.00**
WGC-Accenture Match Play Championship	see below						T33	46,000.00
The Honda Classic	70	70	70	74	284	+4	T37	27,600.00
**WGC-Cadillac Championship**	**66**	**65**	**67**	**71**	**269**	**−19**	**1**	**1,500,000.00**
**Arnold Palmer Invitational**	**69**	**70**	**66**	**70**	**275**	**−13**	**1**	**1,116,000.00**
Masters Tournament	70	73	70	70	283	−5	T4	352,000.00
**The Players Championship**	**67**	**67**	**71**	**70**	**275**	**−13**	**1**	**1,710,000.00**
Memorial Tournament	71	74	79	72	296	+8	T65	12,896.00
U.S. Open	73	70	76	74	293	+13	T32	47,246.00
The Open Championship	69	71	72	74	286	+2	T6	249,376.82
**WGC-Bridgestone Invitational**	**66**	**61**	**68**	**70**	**265**	**−15**	**1**	**1,500,000.00**
PGA Championship	71	70	73	70	284	+4	T40	28,000.00
The Barclays	67	69	69	69	274	−10	T2	528,000.00
Deutsche Bank Championship	68	67	72	73	280	−4	T65	16,720.00
BMW Championship	66	72	66	71	275	−9	T11	176,000.00
The Tour Championship	73	71	69	67	280	E	T22	145,600.00

=== Summary ===
	Events	Cuts made	PGA Tour wins	Majors	2nd	3rd	Top 10	Top 25	Earnings ($)
2013	16	16	5	0	1	0	8	10	8,553,439
**Career**	**309**	**289**	**79**	**14**	**29**	**19**	**185**	**245**	**109,504,139**

== 2013−14 ==
=== Tournaments ===
Tournament	Round 1	Round 2	Round 3	Round 4	Score	To par	Place	Money ($)
Farmers Insurance Open	72	71	79		222	+6	T80	10,919.00
The Honda Classic	71	69	65		205	−5	WD*	0.00
WGC-Cadillac Championship	76	73	66	78	293	+5	T25	76,000.00
Quicken Loans National	74	75			149	+7	CUT	0.00
The Open Championship	69	77	73	75	294	+6	69	21,356.25
WGC-Bridgestone Invitational	68	71	72		211	+1	WD	0.00
PGA Championship	74	74			148	+6	CUT	0.00

*Because Woods withdrew from The Honda Classic after having made the cut, it counts as a cut made.

=== Summary ===
	Events	Cuts made	PGA Tour wins	Majors	2nd	3rd	Top 10	Top 25	Earnings ($)
2013−14	7	5	0	0	0	0	0	1	108,275
**Career**	**316**	**294**	**79**	**14**	**29**	**19**	**185**	**246**	**109,612,414**

== 2014−15 ==
=== Tournaments ===
Tournament	Round 1	Round 2	Round 3	Round 4	Score	To par	Place	Money ($)
Waste Management Phoenix Open	73	82			155	+13	CUT	0.00
Farmers Insurance Open							WD	0.00
Masters Tournament	73	69	68	73	283	−5	T17	155,000.00
The Players Championship	73	71	75	72	291	+3	T69	20,000.00
Memorial Tournament	73	70	85	74	302	+14	71	12,276.00
U.S. Open	80	76			156	+16	CUT	0.00
Greenbrier Classic	66	69	71	67	273	−7	T32	37,922.00
The Open Championship	76	75			151	+7	CUT	0.00
Quicken Loans National	68	66	74	68	276	−8	T18	93,800.00
PGA Championship	75	73			148	+4	CUT	0.00
Wyndham Championship	64	65	68	70	267	−13	T10	129,600.00

=== Summary ===
	Events	Cuts made	PGA Tour wins	Majors	2nd	3rd	Top 10	Top 25	Earnings ($)
2014−15	11	6	0	0	0	0	1	3	448,598
**Career**	**327**	**300**	**79**	**14**	**29**	**19**	**186**	**249**	**110,061,012**

== 2015−16 ==
Woods missed the entire season recovering from surgery.

=== Summary ===
	Events	Cuts made	PGA Tour wins	Majors	2nd	3rd	Top 10	Top 25	Earnings ($)
2015−16	0	0	0	0	0	0	0	0	0
**Career**	**327**	**300**	**79**	**14**	**29**	**19**	**186**	**249**	**110,061,012**

== 2016−17 ==
=== Tournaments ===
Tournament	Round 1	Round 2	Round 3	Round 4	Score	To par	Place	Money ($)
Farmers Insurance Open	76	72			148	+4	CUT	0.00

=== Summary ===
	Events	Cuts made	PGA Tour wins	Majors	2nd	3rd	Top 10	Top 25	Earnings ($)
2016−17	1	0	0	0	0	0	0	0	0
**Career**	**328**	**300**	**79**	**14**	**29**	**19**	**186**	**249**	**110,061,012**

== 2017−18 ==
=== Tournaments ===
Tournament	Round 1	Round 2	Round 3	Round 4	Score	To par	Place	Money ($)
Farmers Insurance Open	72	71	70	72	285	−3	T23	59,685.00
Genesis Open	72	76			148	+6	CUT	0.00
The Honda Classic	70	71	69	70	280	E	12	151,800.00
Valspar Championship	70	68	67	70	275	−9	T2	572,000.00
Arnold Palmer Invitational	68	72	69	69	278	−10	T5	338,200.00
Masters Tournament	73	75	72	69	289	+1	T32	63,663.00
Wells Fargo Championship	71	73	68	74	286	+2	T55	17,479.00
The Players Championship	72	71	65	69	277	−11	T11	225,500.00
Memorial Tournament	72	67	68	72	279	−9	T23	76,985.00
U.S. Open	78	72			150	+10	CUT	0.00
Quicken Loans National	70	65	68	66	269	−11	T4	312,400.00
The Open Championship	71	71	66	71	279	−5	T6	327,000.00
WGC-Bridgestone Invitational	66	68	73	73	280	E	T31	74,750.00
PGA Championship	70	66	66	64	266	−14	2	1,188,000.00
The Northern Trust	71	71	68	70	280	−4	T40	32,400.00
Dell Technologies Championship	72	66	68	71	277	−7	T24	71,228.57
BMW Championship	62	70	66	65	263	−17	T6	312,750.00
**Tour Championship**	**65**	**68**	**65**	**71**	**269**	**−11**	**1**	**1,620,000.00**

=== Summary ===
	Events	Cuts made	PGA Tour wins	Majors	2nd	3rd	Top 10	Top 25	Earnings ($)
2017−18	18	16	1	0	2	0	7	12	5,443,841
**Career**	**346**	**316**	**80**	**14**	**31**	**19**	**193**	**261**	**115,504,853**

== 2018−19 ==
=== Tournaments ===
Tournament	Round 1	Round 2	Round 3	Round 4	Score	To par	Place	Money ($)
Farmers Insurance Open	70	70	71	67	278	−10	T20	79,804.00
Genesis Open	70	71	65	72	278	−6	T15	100,788.00
WGC-Mexico Championship	71	66	70	69	276	−8	T10	161,500.00
The Players Championship	70	71	72	69	282	−6	T30	77,625.00
WGC-Dell Technologies Match Play	see below						T5	315,000.00
**Masters Tournament**	**70**	**68**	**67**	**70**	**275**	**−13**	**1**	**2,070,000.00**
PGA Championship	72	73			145	+5	CUT	0.00
Memorial Tournament	70	72	70	67	279	−9	T9	236,600.00
U.S. Open	70	72	71	69	282	−2	T21	117,598.00
The Open Championship	78	70			148	+6	CUT	0.00
The Northern Trust	75				75	+4	WD	0.00
BMW Championship	71	71	67	72	281	−7	T37	40,700.00

=== Summary ===
	Events	Cuts made	PGA Tour wins	Majors	2nd	3rd	Top 10	Top 25	Earnings ($)
2018−19	12	9	1	1	0	0	4	7	3,199,615
**Career**	**359**	**326**	**81**	**15**	**31**	**19**	**197**	**268**	**118,704,468**

== 2019−20 ==
=== Tournaments ===
Tournament	Round 1	Round 2	Round 3	Round 4	Score	To par	Place	Money ($)
**Zozo Championship**^{J}	**64**	**64**	**66**	**67**	**261**	**−19**	**1**	**1,755,000.00**
Farmers Insurance Open	69	71	69	70	279	−9	T9	181,875.00
Genesis Invitational	69	73	76	77	295	+11	68	19,437.00
Memorial Tournament	71	76	71	76	294	+6	T40	37,665.00
PGA Championship	68	72	72	67	279	−1	T37	45,000.00
The Northern Trust	68	71	73	66	278	−6	T58	21,565.00
BMW Championship	73	75	72	71	291	+11	T51	22,496.00

^{J}Co-sanctioned by the Japan Golf Tour

=== Summary ===
	Events	Cuts made	PGA Tour wins	Majors	2nd	3rd	Top 10	Top 25	Earnings ($)
2019−20	7	7	1	0	0	0	2	2	2,083,038
**Career**	**365**	**332**	**82**	**15**	**31**	**19**	**199**	**270**	**120,787,506**

== 2020−21 ==
=== Tournaments ===
Tournament	Round 1	Round 2	Round 3	Round 4	Score	To par	Place	Money ($)
U.S. Open	73	77			150	+10	CUT	0.00
Zozo Championship	76	66	71	74	287	−1	T72	13,600.00
Masters Tournament	68	71	72	76	287	−1	T38	50,600.00

=== Summary ===
	Events	Cuts made	PGA Tour wins	Majors	2nd	3rd	Top 10	Top 25	Earnings ($)
2020−21	3	2	0	0	0	0	0	0	64,200
**Career**	**368**	**334**	**82**	**15**	**31**	**19**	**199**	**270**	**120,851,706**

== 2021−22 ==
=== Tournaments ===
Tournament	Round 1	Round 2	Round 3	Round 4	Score	To par	Place	Money ($)
Masters Tournament	71	74	78	78	301	+13	47	43,500.00
PGA Championship	74	69	79		222	+12	WD	0.00
The Open Championship	78	75			153	+9	CUT	0.00

=== Summary ===
	Events	Cuts made	PGA Tour wins	Majors	2nd	3rd	Top 10	Top 25	Earnings ($)
2021−22	3	2	0	0	0	0	0	0	43,500
**Career**	**371**	**336**	**82**	**15**	**31**	**19**	**199**	**270**	**120,895,206**

== 2022−23 ==
=== Tournaments ===
Tournament	Round 1	Round 2	Round 3	Round 4	Score	To par	Place	Money ($)
Genesis Invitational	69	74	67	73	283	−1	T45	59,560.00
Masters Tournament	74	73	WD		147	+9	WD	0.00

=== Summary ===
	Events	Cuts made	PGA Tour wins	Majors	2nd	3rd	Top 10	Top 25	Earnings ($)
2022−23	2	2	0	0	0	0	0	0	59,560
**Career**	**373**	**338**	**82**	**15**	**31**	**19**	**199**	**270**	**120,954,766**

== 2024 ==
=== Tournaments ===
Tournament	Round 1	Round 2	Round 3	Round 4	Score	To par	Place	Money ($)
Genesis Invitational	72					+1	WD	0.00
Masters Tournament	73	72	82	77	304	+16	60	44,400.00
PGA Championship	72	77			149	+7	CUT	0.00
U.S. Open	74	73			147	+7	CUT	0.00
Open Championship	79	77			156	+14	CUT	0.00

=== Summary ===
	Events	Cuts made	PGA Tour wins	Majors	2nd	3rd	Top 10	Top 25	Earnings ($)
2024	5	1	0	0	0	0	0	0	44,400
**Career**	**378**	**339**	**82**	**15**	**31**	**19**	**199**	**270**	**120,999,166**

== Other PGA Tour ==
=== Performance at the WGC-Match Play ===
The WGC-Match Play is one of the annual World Golf Championships.

Year	Round of 64	Round of 32	Round of 16	Quarterfinals	Semifinals	Finals
1999	Beat Nick Faldo 4&3	Beat Bob Tway 6&4	Beat Stewart Cink 2&1	Lost to Jeff Maggert 2&1		
2000	Beat Michael Campbell 5&4	Beat Retief Goosen 1 up	Beat Shigeki Maruyama 4&3	Beat Paul Lawrie 1 up	Beat Davis Love III 5&4	Lost to Darren Clarke 4&3
2002	Lost to Peter O'Malley 2&1					
**2003**	**Beat Carl Pettersson 2&1**	**Beat K. J. Choi 5&3**	**Beat Stephen Leaney 7&6**	**Beat Scott Hoch 5&4**	**Beat Adam Scott 19 holes**	**Beat David Toms 2&1**
**2004**	**Beat John Rollins 1 up**	**Beat Trevor Immelman 5&4**	**Beat Freddie Jacobson 5&4**	**Beat Pádraig Harrington 2&1**	**Beat Stephen Leaney 2&1**	**Beat Davis Love III 3&2**
2005	Beat Nick Price 4&3	Lost to Nick O'Hern 3&1				
2006	Beat Stephen Ames 9&8	Beat Robert Allenby 1 up	Lost to Chad Campbell 1 up			
2007	Beat J. J. Henry 3&2	Beat Tim Clark 5&4	Lost to Nick O'Hern in 20 holes			
**2008**	**Beat J. B. Holmes 1 up**	**Beat Arron Oberholser 3&2**	**Beat Aaron Baddeley 20 holes**	**Beat K. J. Choi 3&2**	**Beat Henrik Stenson 2 up**	**Beat Stewart Cink 8&7**
2009	Beat Brendan Jones 3&2	Lost to Tim Clark 4&2				
2011	Lost to Thomas Bjørn 19 holes					
2012	Beat Gonzalo Fernández-Castaño 1 up	Lost to Nick Watney 1 up				
2013	Lost to Charles Howell III 2&1					

Note: Switched to three rounds of group play followed by 16 player knockout in 2015.

Year	Round 1	Round 2	Round 3	Round of 16	Quarterfinals	Semifinals	Finals
2019	Beat Aaron Wise 3&1	Lost to Brandt Snedeker 2&1	Beat Patrick Cantlay 4&2	Beat Rory McIlroy 2&1	Lost to Lucas Bjerregaard 1 up		

=== Performance at the PGA Grand Slam of Golf ===
The PGA Grand Slam of Golf was the world's most exclusive golf tournament. It was an annual off-season golf tournament contested by the year's winners of the four major championships of regular men's golf, which are the Masters Tournament, the U.S. Open, The Open Championship (British Open), and the PGA Championship.

The event was match play in 1998 and 1999. It was stroke play in all other years. Woods won in seven consecutive appearances.

Year	Round 1	Round 2	Score	To par	Place	Money ($)
1997	66	70	136	−8	2	250,000
**1998**	**Beat Lee Janzen 3&2**	**Beat Vijay Singh 2 up**	n/a		**1**	**400,000**
**1999**	**Beat Paul Lawrie 3&2**	**Beat Davis Love III 3&2**	n/a		**1**	**400,000**
**2000**	**71**	**68**	**139**	**−5**	**1**	**400,000**
**2001**	**67**	**65**	**132**	**−12**	**1**	**400,000**
**2002**	**66**	**61**	**127**	**−17**	**1**	**400,000**
**2005**	**67**	**64**	**131**	**−13**	**1**	**400,000**
**2006**	**70**	**66**	**136**	**−8**	**1**	**500,000**

=== Performance at the World Challenge ===
The World Challenge is an off-season tournament which is hosted by Woods. It is played in December.

Year	Round 1	Round 2	Round 3	Round 4	Score	To par	Place	Money ($)
2000 (Jan)	65	70	71	76	282	+2	10	130,000
2000 (Dec)	68	64	67	69	268	−20	2	500,000
**2001**	**69**	**67**	**74**	**64**	**273**	**−15**	**1**	**1,000,000**
2002	68	65	70	67	270	−18	2	500,000
2003	71	71	72	65	279	−9	2	500,000
**2004**	**67**	**66**	**69**	**66**	**268**	**−16**	**1**	**1,250,000**
2005	72	72	69	73	286	−2	T14	167,500
**2006**	**68**	**68**	**70**	**66**	**272**	**−16**	**1**	**1,350,000**
**2007**	**69**	**62**	**67**	**68**	**266**	**−22**	**1**	**1,350,000**
2010	65	66	68	73	272	−16	2	650,000
**2011**	**69**	**67**	**73**	**69**	**278**	**−10**	**1**	**1,200,000**
2012	70	69	69	71	279	−9	T4	201,667
2013	71	62	72	70	275	−13	2	400,000
2014	77	70	69	72	288	E	T17	102,500
2016	73	65	70	76	284	−4	15	107,000
2017	69	68	75	68	280	−8	T9	122,500
2018	73	69	72	73	287	−1	17	105,000
2019	72	66	67	69	274	−14	4	175,000
2023	75	70	71	72	288	E	18	130,000

== European Tour ==
Woods first tournament win as a professional on the European Tour was at the Johnnie Walker Classic in 1998. He did not earn any money before that due to his amateur status. World Golf Championships and major events (all Open Championships and U.S.-based majors since 1998) are also considered official European Tour events but they are covered in the PGA Tour section.

Woods was never a member of the European Tour and therefore did not qualify to count his winnings towards the career money list. He is third on the all-time wins list.

=== Tournaments ===
Year	Tournament	Round 1	Round 2	Round 3	Round 4	Score	To par	Place	Money (€)
1994	Johnnie Walker Classic	74	71	74	72	292	+4	T34	(amateur)
1995	Scottish Open	69	71	75	78	293	+5	T48	(amateur)
1996	Scottish Open	81	75			156	+12	CUT	(amateur)
**1998**	**Johnnie Walker Classic**^{Au}	**72**	**71**	**71**	**65**	**279**	**−9**	**1**	**186,662.00**
**1999**	**Deutsche Bank - SAP Open TPC of Europe**	**69**	**68**	**68**	**68**	**273**	**−15**	**1**	**280,000.00**
1999 (2000 season)	Johnnie Walker Classic^{As, Au}	68	72	70	71	281	−7	6	43,624.00
2000	Deutsche Bank - SAP Open TPC of Europe	70	70	67	70	277	−11	T3	139,500.00
**2000** **(2001 season)**	**Johnnie Walker Classic**^{As, Au}	**68**	**65**	**65**	**65**	**263**	**−25**	**1**	**221,134.47**
2001	Dubai Desert Classic	64	64	68	72	268	−20	T2	138,184.57
**2001**	**Deutsche Bank - SAP Open TPC of Europe**	**69**	68	**63**	**66**	**266**	**−22**	**1**	**450,000.00**
**2002**	**Deutsche Bank - SAP Open TPC of Europe**	**69**	**67**	**64**	**68**	**268**	**−20**	**1**	**450,000.00**
2003	Deutsche Bank - SAP Open TPC of Europe	69	71	70	68	278	−10	T29	23,220.00
2004	Dubai Desert Classic	70	69	69	68	276	−12	T5	53,211.26
2005 (2006 season)	HSBC Champions	65	69	67	70	271	−17	2	469,692.00
**2006**	**Dubai Desert Classic**	**67**	**66**	**67**	**69**	**269**	**−19**	**1**	**329,760.30**
2006	HSBC World Match Play Championship	Lost to Shaun Micheel 4&3 in 1st round							61,971.66
2006 (2007 season)	HSBC Champions	72	64	73	67	276	−12	2	437,268.79
2007	Dubai Desert Classic	68	67	67	69	271	−17	T3	104,671.46
**2008**	**Dubai Desert Classic**	**65**	**71**	**73**	**65**	**274**	**−14**	**1**	**283,965.09**
2009	WGC-HSBC Champions	67	67	70	72	276	−12	T6	127,866.05
**2009**	**JBWere Masters**^{Au}	**66**	**68**	**72**	**68**	**274**	**−14**	**1**	**173,117.54**
2010	WGC-HSBC Champions	68	72	73	68	271	−7	T6	104,447.20
2011	Omega Dubai Desert Classic	71	66	72	75	284	−4	T20	19,641.01
2012	Abu Dhabi HSBC Golf Championship	70	69	66	72	277	−11	T3	107,577.46
2013	Abu Dhabi HSBC Golf Championship	72	75			147	+3	CUT	0.00
2013	Turkish Airlines Open	70	63	68	67	268	−20	T3	287,567.31
2014	Omega Dubai Desert Classic	68	73	70	71	282	−6	T41	10,371.93
2017	Omega Dubai Desert Classic	77				77	+5	WD	0.00

^{As}Co-sanctioned by the Asian Tour
^{Au}Co-sanctioned by the PGA Tour of Australasia

=== Summary ===
Type	Events	Cuts made	Wins	2nd	3rd	Top 10	Top 25	Earnings (€)
European Tour*	28	25	8	3	4	20	21	4,503,454.10
Majors^	74	65	15	7	4	39	56	23,258,119.50
WGCs^	45	44	18	2	0	33	37	21,576,519.39
Total	147	132	41	12	8	92	112	49,338,092.99

Note: Woods' 1997 Masters win is included here but not the money earned.
*Those tournaments listed above.
^Those majors and WGCs that are also official PGA Tour events.

== Japan Golf Tour ==
Woods has participated in six events on the Japan Golf Tour. He has played in the Casio World Open once, the Dunlop Phoenix Tournament four times, and the Zozo Championship once (an event co-sanctioned by the PGA Tour).

=== Tournaments ===
Year	Tournament	Round 1	Round 2	Round 3	Round 4	Score	To par	Place	Money (¥)
1998	Casio World Open	69	74	71	70	284	−4	T15	1,602,000
2002	Dunlop Phoenix Tournament	71	68	69	67	275	−9	8	6,100,000
**2004**	**Dunlop Phoenix Tournament**	**65**	**67**	**65**	**67**	**264**	**−16**	**1**	**40,000,000**
**2005**	**Dunlop Phoenix Tournament**	**65**	**67**	**68**	**72**	**272**	**−8**	**1**	**40,000,000**
2006	Dunlop Phoenix Tournament	67	65	72	67	271	−9	2	20,000,000
**2019**	**Zozo Championship**^{P}	**64**	**64**	**66**	**67**	**261**	**−19**	**1**	**94,348,800**

^{P}Co-sanctioned by the PGA Tour

=== Summary ===
Events	Cuts made	Wins	2nd	3rd	Top 10	Top 25	Earnings (¥)
6	6	3	1	0	5	6	202,050,800

- Source

== Asian Tour ==
Year	Tournament	Round 1	Round 2	Round 3	Round 4	Score	To par	Place	Money ($)
1997	**Asian Honda Classic**	**70**	**64**	**66**	**68**	**268**	**−20**	**1**	48,450
1999	Johnnie Walker Classic^{E, A}	68	72	70	71	281	−7	6	45,220
2000	**Johnnie Walker Classic**^{E, A}	**68**	**65**	**65**	**65**	**263**	**−25**	**1**	190,798
2012	CIMB Classic	66	67	69	63	265	−19	T4	265,000

^{E}Co-sanctioned by the European Tour
^{A}Co-sanctioned by the PGA Tour of Australasia

=== Summary ===
Events	Cuts made	Wins	2nd	3rd	Top 10	Top 25	Earnings ($)
4	4	2	0	0	4	4	549,468

== PGA Tour of Australasia ==
Year	Tournament	Round 1	Round 2	Round 3	Round 4	Score	To par	Place	Money (A$)
1996	Holden Australian Open	79	72	71	70	292	+4	T5	34,250
1997	Ericsson Masters	68	70	72	73	283	−9	T8	20,250
**1998**	**Johnnie Walker Classic**^{E}	**72**	**71**	**71**	**65**	**279**	**−9**	**1**	**333,325**
1999	Johnnie Walker Classic^{E, A}	68	72	70	71	281	−7	6	67,200
**2000**	**Johnnie Walker Classic**^{E, A}	**68**	**65**	**65**	**65**	**263**	**−25**	**1**	**242,260**
2002	TelstraSaturn Hyundai New Zealand Open	70	73	67	69	279	−5	T6	29,596
**2009**	**JBWere Masters**^{E}	**66**	**68**	**72**	**68**	**274**	**−14**	**1**	**270,000**
2010	JBWere Masters	69	72	71	65	277	−7	4	72,000
2011	Emirates Australian Open	68	67	75	67	277	−11	3	101,250

^{E}Co-sanctioned by the European Tour
^{A}Co-sanctioned by the Asian Tour

=== Summary ===
Events	Cuts made	Wins	2nd	3rd	Top 10	Top 25	Earnings (A$)
9	9	3	0	1	9	9	1,170,131

== Unofficial money events earning OWGR points ==
All tournaments listed above were official money events on one or more tours (unless noted) and earned Official World Golf Ranking (OWGR) points except the 1997 Asian Honda Classic, which did not carry OWGR points. Woods competed in other events that were tour-sanctioned, earned unofficial money, and earned OWGR points. These were:

- 1998 Cisco World Match Play Championship (2nd place, US$150,000)
- 1998 Million Dollar Challenge (2nd place, US$250,000)
- All World Challenge events beginning in 2010

== Team events ==
=== Ryder Cup ===
All records are in win–loss–tie format.

Year	Four-Ball	Foursomes	Singles
1997	0–1–1	1–1	0–1
1999	0–2	1–1	1–0
2002	1–1	1–1	0–0–1
2004	1–1	0–2	1–0
2006	1–1	1–1	1–0
2008	Injured, did not play		
2010	1–0	1–1	1–0
2012	0–2	0–1	0–0–1
2018	0–2	0–1	0–1
**Overall**	**4–10–1**	**5–9**	**4–2–2**
**All-time**	**13–21–3**		

=== Presidents Cup ===
All records are in win–loss–tie format.

Year	Four-Ball	Foursomes	Singles
1998	0–2	1–1	1–0
2000	0–2	2–0	1–0
2003	0–2	2–0	1–0
2005	2–0	0–1–1	0–1
2007	1–1	2–0	0–1
2009	2–0	2–0	1–0
2011	0–2	1–1	1–0
2013	2–0	1–1	1–0
2019	1–0	1–0	1–0
**Overall**	**8–9**	**12–4–1**	**7–2**
**All-time**	**27–15–1**		

== Notes and references ==
- All information is from golfstats.com and pgatour.com.
