= Tiger, Tiger (book) =

2024 non-fiction book by James Patterson and Peter de Jonge

- Front cover
- Author: James Patterson and Peter de Jonge
- Language: English
- Subject: Biography of Tiger Woods
- Genre: Nonfiction, biography, sports
- Publisher: Little, Brown and Company
- Publication date: July 15, 2024
- Publication place: United States
- Media type: Print (hardcover, paperback), e-book, audiobook
- Pages: 448
- ISBN: 9780316438605

Tiger, Tiger is a biography of professional golfer Tiger Woods, authored by James Patterson and Peter de Jonge. It was published on July 15, 2024, by Little, Brown and Company. The book provides a comprehensive account of Woods' life, covering his early years, rise to fame, significant achievements, personal struggles, and eventual comeback.

== Content ==
Tiger, Tiger is divided into six parts, with both a prologue and an epilogue, covering different stages of Tiger Woods's life:

- Prodigy
- Amateur
- Professional
- Superstar
- Family Man
- Comeback

Patterson and co-author Peter de Jonge provide a chronological journey through Woods' life, emphasizing the significant role of his parents, particularly his father Earl Woods, in shaping his career and preparing him for the realities of race in America. The biography examines Woods' professional achievements and personal challenges, offering an overview of his life and career.

The book includes stories from various sources who preferred to remain anonymous due to Woods' preference for privacy. Some notable stories include a young Woods declaring on TV that he would beat Jack Nicklaus "when he was 20 or so" and anecdotes about his relationship with his daughter, Sam, who humorously questioned his seriousness due to his costume choices at Comic-Con. Tiger, Tiger highlights key moments in Woods' career, such as his first putt at the 1995 Masters, his "perfect" shot on No. 14 at St. Andrews, and his recent comeback tours. The narrative details Woods' journey, focusing on his commitment and impact on golf. By the age of 25, Woods had achieved significant success, including being named Sportsman of the Year by Sports Illustrated twice, winning over thirty professional tournaments, and becoming the youngest golfer to win all four Grand Slam tournaments. Patterson and de Jonge present a narrative that encompasses Woods' professional and personal experiences, exploring both his achievements and the challenges he faced. The book examines the factors that contributed to the notable events in Woods' career, aiming to provide readers with a comprehensive understanding of his life. Through a series of interviews and extensive research, Patterson and de Jonge offer an in-depth look into Woods' life and career, providing detailed accounts of key moments in Woods' life and career.

== Publication ==
James Patterson chose to write about Tiger Woods due to his own affinity for golf and Woods' significant impact on the sport. It's Patterson's fourth golf book. Patterson, an avid golfer with nine holes-in-one to his name, did not speak directly with Woods for the biography but reached out to dozens of people who knew, worked with, or played golf with him. These stories cover Woods' life from his childhood as a young golf prodigy to his present-day endeavors".

Tiger, Tiger was published on July 15, 2024, by Little, Brown and Company. It is available in Hardcover, eBook, and Audiobook formats.

== Reception ==
Tiger, Tiger debuted on the New York Times Best Seller list for Hardcover Nonfiction for the week ending July 27, 2024.

The book has been noted for its detailed narrative and storytelling style, which aims to make Woods' life accessible to a broad audience. Patterson's decision to focus on storytelling rather than editorializing allows readers to form their own opinions about Woods, making the biography comprehensive and balanced. The inclusion of vivid scenes and personal anecdotes provides a deeper understanding of Woods' experiences and challenges, both on and off the golf course.

Gabriella Ferrigine from Salon.com wrote that Patterson aims to provide a comprehensive view of Woods, allowing readers to form their own opinions on the complex figure.

However, some reviews have pointed out that while Patterson's storytelling is compelling, the biography lacks deep personal insights and strong editorializing. Critics at Publishers Weekly described the book as "strangely detached," noting that Patterson relies heavily on previously published remarks and provides little new, firsthand information. This has led to comparisons with other notable biographies, such as those by Jeff Benedict and Armen Keteyian, which are considered to offer more depth and direct engagement with Woods' life.
