= Peter de Jonge =

American novelist

- Born: April 5, 1954 (age 72); Stamford, Connecticut, U.S.
- Education: Princeton University
- Occupation: Writer
- Parent(s): Alfred de Jonge; Jane de Jonge
- Writing career
- Genres: Fiction; non-fiction

Peter de Jonge (born April 5, 1954) is an American writer of fiction and non-fiction.

His first novel "Shadows Still Remain" (2009) was a Washington Post Best Book of the Year and the three novels he co-authored with James Patterson were #1 New York Times Best Sellers. He has been a frequent contributor to The New York Times Magazine since 1986, as well as New York magazine, National Geographic, DETAILS, Harper's Bazaar and Manhattan, inc. His non-fiction has been republished in numerous anthologies including Best American Sports Writing in 1996 and 2004. He lives in New York, where his crime novels are set.

== Background and education ==
Peter de Jonge was born in Stamford, Connecticut, and except for three years in Switzerland as a child, grew up there. As a teenager, he was a highly ranked tennis player and competed in the National Juniors in Kalamazoo, Michigan. His father, Alfred de Jonge, was born in Frankfurt, Germany, where he escaped the Holocaust in 1937, then returned eight years later with the U.S. Army to help defeat the German forces. His mother Jane de Jonge is an artist. After graduating from Princeton University in 1977, de Jonge worked for weekly papers in Ridgefield, Wilton and Redding, Connecticut, and for the Associated Press in Newark and Albany. In the mid-eighties, while employed as a copywriter at J. Walter Thompson in New York, he began writing for Manhattan, inc., The New York Times Magazine and National Geographic. When those pieces came to the attention of James Patterson, an executive at JWT who was just establishing himself as a best selling author, he hired de Jonge to be the first of his many co-authors on the golf novel Miracle on the 17th Green (1996). After two more partnerships with Patterson on The Beach House (2002) and Beach Road (2006), de Jonge broke off to create his own critically acclaimed series featuring NYPD Det. Darlene O'Hara, modeled in part on NYPD Homicide Det. Donna Torres. Shadows Still Remain was published in 2009 and Buried on Avenue B in 2012.

== Books ==
- Buried on Avenue B (2012)
- Shadows Still Remain (2009)

=== Books co-authored with James Patterson ===
- Miracle on the 17th Green (1996)
- The Beach House (2002)
- Beach Road (2006)
- Miracle at Augusta (2015)
- Miracle at St. Andrews (2019)
- Tiger, Tiger (2024)

== Articles ==
- "Born on the Baseline," 30 October 1988
- "A Soviet Hoopster in the Promised Land," 5 November 1989
- "A 90's Kind of Rivalry," 27 August 1995
- "When the Putting Goes Bad," 13 March 1988
- "The Leap of His Life; A Rookie and His Burdens," 22 June 2003
- "Television's Final Frontier," 22 August 1999
- "Riding the Wild, Perilous Waters of Amazon.com," 14 March 1999
- "Being the Big Guy; Actor John Goodman: Funny and Formidable," 10 February 1991
