= 2007 WGC-Accenture Match Play Championship =

Coordinates: 32°27′36.02″N 111°4′17.28″W

Tournament information
- Dates: February 21–25, 2007
- Location: Marana, Arizona
- Course(s): The Gallery Golf Club at Dove Mountain (South Course)
- Tour(s): PGA Tour; European Tour

Statistics
- Par: 72
- Length: 7,466
- Field: 64 players
- Prize fund: $8,000,000
- Winner's share: $1,350,000

Champion
- (Sweden) Henrik Stenson
- def. Geoff Ogilvy 2 & 1

The 2007 WGC-Accenture Match Play Championship was a golf tournament that was played from February 21–25, 2007 over the South Course at The Gallery Golf Club at Dove Mountain in Marana, Arizona. It was the ninth WGC-Accenture Match Play Championship and the first of three World Golf Championships events held in 2007. It was the first time the championship was played at The Gallery, having previously been hosted by the La Costa Resort and Spa in Carlsbad, California.

Henrik Stenson defeated defending champion Geoff Ogilvy 2 and 1 in the 36 hole final to claim his first World Golf Championships title. The total purse was $8,000,000 of which Stenson earned $1,350,000. He also became the first player from Continental Europe to win one of the individual World Golf Championships.

== Brackets ==
The Championship was a single elimination match play event. The field consisted of the top 64 players available from the Official World Golf Rankings, seeded according to the rankings. Number 60 Charl Schwartzel decided to play the South African PGA Championship on the Sunshine Tour in an effort to claim that Tour's Order of Merit (he was successful). Number 65 J. J. Henry took Schwartzel's place in the field.

=== Bobby Jones bracket ===
First round February 21
1	(United States) Tiger Woods	3&2
16	(United States) J. J. Henry
8	(South Africa) Tim Clark	2&1
9	(Australia) Robert Allenby
5	(England) David Howell
12	(South Africa) Rory Sabbatini	2up
4	(Australia) Nick O'Hern	4&3
13	(United States) Lucas Glover
6	(South Korea) K. J. Choi	2&1
11	(Sweden) Carl Pettersson
3	(Sweden) Henrik Stenson	1up
14	(United States) Zach Johnson
7	(Japan) Shingo Katayama
10	(Australia) Aaron Baddeley	1up
2	(England) Luke Donald	3&1
15	(Spain) Miguel Á. Jiménez

Second round February 22
1	(United States) Tiger Woods	5&4
8	(South Africa) Tim Clark
12	(South Africa) Rory Sabbatini
4	(Australia) Nick O'Hern	2&1
6	(South Korea) K. J. Choi
3	(Sweden) Henrik Stenson	2up
10	(Australia) Aaron Baddeley	1up
2	(England) Luke Donald

Third round February 23
1	(United States) Tiger Woods
4	(Australia) Nick O'Hern	20h
10	(Australia) Aaron Baddeley
3	(Sweden) Henrik Stenson	4&3

Fourth round February 24
4	(Australia) Nick O'Hern
3	(Sweden) Henrik Stenson	1up

=== Ben Hogan bracket ===
First round February 21
1	(United States) Phil Mickelson	1up
16	(Australia) Richard Green
8	(New Zealand) Michael Campbell
9	(England) Justin Rose	6&5
5	(Australia) Stuart Appleby
12	(United States) Charles Howell III	4&3
4	(Spain) Sergio García	19h
13	(Northern Ireland) Darren Clarke
6	(United States) Chris DiMarco	4&3
11	(United States) Brett Wetterich
3	(South Africa) Trevor Immelman	6&5
14	(Denmark) Thomas Bjørn
7	(England) Ian Poulter	5&4
10	(United States) Bart Bryant
2	(South Africa) Ernie Els
15	(Wales) Bradley Dredge	4&2

Quarter-finals
1	(United States) Phil Mickelson
9	(England) Justin Rose	3&1
12	(United States) Charles Howell III	4&3
4	(Spain) Sergio García
6	(United States) Chris DiMarco
3	(South Africa) Trevor Immelman	3&1
7	(England) Ian Poulter	3&1
15	(Wales) Bradley Dredge

Third round February 23
9	(England) Justin Rose	3&2
12	(United States) Charles Howell III
3	(South Africa) Trevor Immelman	2&1
7	(England) Ian Poulter

Fourth round February 24
9	(England) Justin Rose
3	(South Africa) Trevor Immelman	5&4

=== Gary Player bracket ===
First round February 21
1	(United States) Jim Furyk	2&1
16	(United States) Brett Quigley
8	(Argentina) Ángel Cabrera
9	(United States) Chad Campbell	2up
5	(United States) David Toms	6&4
12	(United States) Arron Oberholser
4	(United States) Davis Love III
13	(United States) Ben Crane	2&1
6	(United States) Stewart Cink	3&2
11	(India) Jeev Milkha Singh
3	(Republic of Ireland) Pádraig Harrington	19h
14	(England) Lee Westwood
7	(Sweden) Robert Karlsson
10	(Canada) Stephen Ames	8&7
2	(Fiji) Vijay Singh	4&3
15	(United States) John Rollins

Second round February 22
1	(United States) Jim Furyk
9	(United States) Chad Campbell	19h
5	(United States) David Toms	3&2
13	(United States) Ben Crane
6	(United States) Stewart Cink	1up
3	(Republic of Ireland) Pádraig Harrington
10	(Canada) Stephen Ames	19h
2	(Fiji) Vijay Singh

Third round February 23
9	(United States) Chad Campbell	1up
5	(United States) David Toms
6	(United States) Stewart Cink
10	(Canada) Stephen Ames	3&1

Fourth round February 24
9	(United States) Chad Campbell	1up
10	(Canada) Stephen Ames

=== Sam Snead bracket ===
First round February 21
1	(Australia) Adam Scott
16	(United States) Shaun Micheel	21h
8	(South Korea) Yang Yong-eun
9	(Australia) Rod Pampling	5&4
5	(Scotland) Colin Montgomerie	2&1
12	(Sweden) Johan Edfors
4	(England) Paul Casey	1up
13	(Canada) Mike Weir
6	(Spain) José M. Olazábal	19h
11	(United States) Paul Goydos
3	(Australia) Geoff Ogilvy	4&3
14	(United States) Steve Stricker
7	(United States) Joe Durant
10	(Sweden) Niclas Fasth	1up
2	(South Africa) Retief Goosen	5&4
15	(United States) Scott Verplank

Second round February 22
16	(United States) Shaun Micheel	1up
9	(Australia) Rod Pampling
5	(Scotland) Colin Montgomerie
4	(England) Paul Casey	4&3
6	(Spain) José M. Olazábal
3	(Australia) Geoff Ogilvy	2&1
10	(Sweden) Niclas Fasth	1up
2	(South Africa) Retief Goosen

Third round February 23
16	(United States) Shaun Micheel
4	(England) Paul Casey	2up
3	(Australia) Geoff Ogilvy	2&1
10	(Sweden) Niclas Fasth

Fourth round February 24
4	(England) Paul Casey
3	(Australia) Geoff Ogilvy	5&4

=== Final Four ===
Semi-finals; February 24
3	(Sweden) Henrik Stenson	3&2
3	(South Africa) Trevor Immelman
9	(United States) Chad Campbell
3	(Australia) Geoff Ogilvy	3&2

Finals; February 25
3	(Sweden) Henrik Stenson	2&1
3	(Australia) Geoff Ogilvy
Third place
3	(South Africa) Trevor Immelman	4&2
9	(United States) Chad Campbell

== Prize money breakdown ==
Place	US ($)
Champion	1,350,000
Runner-up	800,000
Third place	575,000
Fourth place	475,000
Losing quarter-finalists x 4	260,000
Losing third round x 8	130,000
Losing second round x 16	90,000
Losing first round x 32	40,000
Total	$8,000,000
