= Miracle at St. Andrews =

- First edition
- Author: James Patterson and Peter de Jonge
- Language: English
- Genre: Sports fiction
- Publisher: Little, Brown & Company
- Publication date: April 8, 2019
- Publication place: United States
- Media type: Print (hardcover)
- Pages: 256 pp (first edition, hardcover)
- ISBN: 978-0316519106
- Preceded by: Miracle at Augusta (2015)

Miracle at St. Andrews is the third in the series of "Miracle at" golf novels by James Patterson and Peter de Jonge.

== Plot ==
Travis McKinley spends four years as a professional golfer later in life, and then he is no longer good enough to compete. He takes his family on a trip to England and then Scotland. In Scotland he meets a Scottish native he had met earlier at a golf course in the United States. This man had helped him improve his golf game, and in Scotland, his coaching helps Travis win a tournament. This is a dream come true for Travis and his family. This is nothing compared to the chance Travis gets to play some of golfing's greats in a tournament at the place where golfing began, at St. Andrews.

== Reviews ==
Book reporter reviewed this book, although the reviewer never stated whether they liked the book or not.

The House Next Door did not immediately make The New York Times best sellers list.
