= The Gallery Golf Club =

Golf club located in Marana, Arizona

- Interactive map of The Gallery Golf Club
- 32°27′36.02″N 111°4′17.28″W

Club information
- Location: Marana, Arizona, U.S.
- Tota holes: 36
- Tournaments: WGC-Accenture Match Play Championship; LIV Golf Tucson

North Course
- Designed by: John Fought; Tom Lehman
- Par: 72

South Course
- Designed by: John Fought
- Par: 72

The Gallery Golf Club is located east of Marana, Arizona, northwest of Tucson at Dove Mountain. The two 18-hole courses are approximately seven miles east of Interstate 10 at an average elevation of 2875 feet (850 m) above sea level. The Ritz-Carlton Dove Mountain sits to the Northwest.

The Gallery North Course is ranked #1 in Southern Arizona by Golf Digest and is acknowledged as one of Golfweek's Top 100 Modern Courses. The Gallery South Course opened in December 2003 and was nominated as one of Golf Digest's 100 Best. It is best known for hosting the WGC-Accenture Match Play Championship, in 2007 and 2008.

The Gallery is notable for having the longest par 5 in North America; the ninth hole is measured at a length of 725 yards.

== WGC-Accenture Match Play Championship winners at The Gallery ==
- 2008 (United States) Tiger Woods
- 2007 (Sweden) Henrik Stenson

The Gallery is still the only facility in Arizona where Tiger Woods has won an event as a professional.

== Ownership ==
From its inception in 1998 until 2016, The Gallery Golf Club was owned and developed by members of the MacMillan family (descendants of the Cargill family). The club was sold to Escalante Golf, Inc. in December 2016.
