= 2002 WGC-Accenture Match Play Championship =

Coordinates: 33°05′32.16″N 117°16′01.33″W

Tournament information
- Dates: February 20–24, 2002
- Location: Carlsbad, California
- Course(s): La Costa Resort and Spa
- Tour(s): PGA Tour; European Tour

Statistics
- Par: 72
- Length: 7,022
- Field: 64 players
- Prize fund: $5,500,000
- Winner's share: $1,000,000

Champion
- (United States) Kevin Sutherland
- def. Scott McCarron 1up

The 2002 WGC-Accenture Match Play Championship was a golf tournament that was played from February 20–24, 2002 at La Costa Resort and Spa in Carlsbad, California. It was the fourth WGC-Accenture Match Play Championship and the first of four World Golf Championships events held in 2002.

Kevin Sutherland won his first and only World Golf Championships event by defeating Scott McCarron 1 up in the 36 hole final. It was also the only PGA Tour win for Sutherland.

== Brackets ==
The Championship was a single elimination match play event. The field consisted of the top 64 players available from the Official World Golf Rankings, seeded according to the rankings. José Cóceres (ranked 23) withdrew because he was recovering from a broken arm and Thomas Bjørn (ranked 24) withdrew to rest an injured shoulder. They were replaced by John Cook (ranked 65) and Peter O'Malley (ranked 66).

=== Bobby Jones bracket ===
First round February 20
1	(United States) Tiger Woods
16	(Australia) Peter O'Malley	2&1
8	(Zimbabwe) Nick Price	2&1
9	(Argentina) Ángel Cabrera
5	(United States) Bob Estes	1up
12	(Australia) Stuart Appleby
4	(United States) Scott Verplank	3&2
13	(United States) Frank Lickliter
6	(New Zealand) Michael Campbell
11	(Sweden) Niclas Fasth	2&1
3	(Fiji) Vijay Singh	3&2
14	(Japan) Toru Taniguchi
7	(United States) Paul Azinger	1up
10	(Sweden) Jesper Parnevik
2	(United States) Davis Love III	2&1
15	(Wales) Phillip Price

Second round February 21
16	(Australia) Peter O'Malley
8	(Zimbabwe) Nick Price	2&1
5	(United States) Bob Estes	19h
4	(United States) Scott Verplank
11	(Sweden) Niclas Fasth	3&2
3	(Fiji) Vijay Singh
7	(United States) Paul Azinger	1up
2	(United States) Davis Love III

Third round February 22
8	(Zimbabwe) Nick Price
5	(United States) Bob Estes	1up
11	(Sweden) Niclas Fasth
7	(United States) Paul Azinger	20h

Fourth round February 23
5	(United States) Bob Estes
7	(United States) Paul Azinger	2&1

=== Ben Hogan bracket ===
First round February 20
1	(Spain) Sergio García	3&2
16	(United States) Lee Janzen
8	(United States) Stewart Cink
9	(United States) Charles Howell III	4&3
5	(Scotland) Colin Montgomerie
12	(United States) Scott McCarron	2&1
4	(Canada) Mike Weir	3&2
13	(Scotland) Paul Lawrie
6	(United States) Scott Hoch
11	(United States) Steve Lowery	5&4
3	(Northern Ireland) Darren Clarke
14	(United States) Matt Gogel	2&1
7	(United States) Tom Lehman	2&1
10	(United States) Hal Sutton
2	(South Africa) Ernie Els	4&3
15	(United States) Jeff Sluman

Second round February 21
1	(Spain) Sergio García	1up
9	(United States) Charles Howell III
12	(United States) Scott McCarron	1up
4	(Canada) Mike Weir
11	(United States) Scott Lowery
14	(United States) Matt Gogel	20h
7	(United States) Tom Lehman	19h
2	(South Africa) Ernie Els

Third round February 22
1	(Spain) Sergio García
12	(United States) Scott McCarron	1up
14	(United States) Matt Gogel
7	(United States) Tom Lehman	4&3

Fourth round February 23
12	(United States) Scott McCarron	4&3
7	(United States) Tom Lehman

=== Gary Player bracket ===
First round February 20
1	(United States) Phil Mickelson
16	(United States) John Cook	3&2
8	(Japan) Shingo Katayama
9	(England) Lee Westwood	4&3
5	(United States) Kenny Perry
12	(United States) Brad Faxon	7&6
4	(Germany) Bernhard Langer
13	(Australia) Adam Scott	2&1
6	(United States) Mark Calcavecchia	3&2
11	(United States) Jerry Kelly
3	(United States) Chris DiMarco	3&2
14	(United States) Steve Stricker
7	(Spain) José M. Olazábal	1up
10	(United States) Justin Leonard
2	(South Africa) Retief Goosen	4&3
15	(United States) Billy Mayfair

Second round February 21
16	(United States) John Cook	1up
9	(England) Lee Westwood
12	(United States) Brad Faxon	3&2
13	(Australia) Adam Scott
6	(United States) Mark Calcavecchia	2&1
3	(United States) Chris DiMarco
7	(Spain) José M. Olazábal	1up
2	(South Africa) Retief Goosen

Third round February 22
16	(United States) John Cook
12	(United States) Brad Faxon	3&2
6	(United States) Mark Calcavecchia
7	(Spain) José M. Olazábal	2up

Fourth round February 23
12	(United States) Brad Faxon	20h
7	(Spain) José M. Olazábal

=== Sam Snead bracket ===
First round February 20
1	(United States) David Duval
16	(United States) Kevin Sutherland	20h
8	(Republic of Ireland) Paul McGinley	5&4
9	(United States) Joe Durant
5	(Japan) Toshi Izawa	4&3
12	(Sweden) Pierre Fulke
4	(United States) Jim Furyk	20h
13	(United States) Billy Andrade
6	(Australia) Robert Allenby
11	(United States) Kirk Triplett	3&2
3	(Republic of Ireland) Pádraig Harrington
14	(United States) Steve Flesch	3&2
7	(United States) Rocco Mediate	5&4
10	(United States) John Daly
2	(United States) David Toms	1up
15	(South Africa) Rory Sabbatini

Second round February 21
16	(United States) Kevin Sutherland	2&1
8	(Republic of Ireland) Paul McGinley
5	(Japan) Toshi Izawa
4	(United States) Jim Furyk	2&1
11	(United States) Kirk Triplett
14	(United States) Steve Flesch	3&2
7	(United States) Rocco Mediate
2	(United States) David Toms	1up

Third round February 22
16	(United States) Kevin Sutherland	4&3
4	(United States) Jim Furyk
14	(United States) Steve Flesch
2	(United States) David Toms	1up

Fourth round February 23
16	(United States) Kevin Sutherland	3&2
2	(United States) David Toms

=== Final Four ===
Semi-finals; February 23
7	(United States) Paul Azinger
12	(United States) Scott McCarron	1up
12	(United States) Brad Faxon
16	(United States) Kevin Sutherland	1up

Finals; February 24
12	(United States) Scott McCarron
16	(United States) Kevin Sutherland	1up
Third place
7	(United States) Paul Azinger
12	(United States) Brad Faxon	1up

== Prize money breakdown ==
Place	US ($)
Champion	1,000,000
Runner-up	550,000
Third place	450,000
Fourth place	360,000
Losing quarter-finalists x 4	175,000
Losing third round x 8	85,000
Losing second round x 16	55,000
Losing first round x 32	27,500
Total	$5,500,000
