= 2008 WGC-Accenture Match Play Championship =

Coordinates: 32°27′36.02″N 111°4′17.28″W

Tournament information
- Dates: February 20–24, 2008
- Location: Marana, Arizona
- Course(s): The Gallery Golf Club at Dove Mountain (South Course)
- Tour(s): PGA Tour; European Tour

Statistics
- Par: 72
- Length: 7,351
- Field: 64 players
- Prize fund: $8,000,000
- Winner's share: $1,350,000

Champion
- (United States) Tiger Woods
- def. Stewart Cink 8 & 7

The 2008 WGC-Accenture Match Play Championship was a golf tournament that was played from February 20–24, 2008 over the South Course at The Gallery Golf Club at Dove Mountain in Marana, Arizona. It was the tenth WGC-Accenture Match Play Championship and the first of three World Golf Championships held in 2008.

The purse remained at $8,000,000, one of the largest in golf. Tiger Woods won his third WGC Match Play title, and his 15th World Golf Championships event, by beating fellow American Stewart Cink 8 and 7 in the final.

== Brackets ==
The Championship was a single elimination match play event. The field consisted of the top 64 players available from the Official World Golf Rankings, seeded according to the rankings. Brett Wetterich (ranked 45) pulled out of the event with a shoulder injury and was replaced by J. B. Holmes (ranked 65).

=== Bobby Jones bracket ===
First round February 20
1	(United States) Tiger Woods	1up
16	(United States) J. B. Holmes
8	(Canada) Mike Weir
9	(United States) Arron Oberholser	3&1
5	(Australia) Aaron Baddeley	4&2
12	(United States) Mark Calcavecchia
4	(United States) Zach Johnson
13	(United States) David Toms	2&1
6	(England) Ian Poulter	2&1
11	(Denmark) Søren Hansen
3	(South Korea) K. J. Choi	3&2
14	(Colombia) Camilo Villegas
7	(England) Paul Casey	2up
10	(Sweden) Robert Karlsson
2	(South Africa) Rory Sabbatini
15	(Wales) Bradley Dredge	4&3

Second round February 21
1	(United States) Tiger Woods	3&2
9	(United States) Arron Oberholser
5	(Australia) Aaron Baddeley
13	(United States) David Toms	WD
6	(England) Ian Poulter
3	(South Korea) K. J. Choi	19h
7	(England) Paul Casey	2&1
15	(Wales) Bradley Dredge

Third round February 22
1	(United States) Tiger Woods	20h
5	(Australia) Aaron Baddeley
3	(South Korea) K. J. Choi	2up
7	(England) Paul Casey

Fourth round February 23
1	(United States) Tiger Woods	3&2
3	(South Korea) K. J. Choi

=== Ben Hogan bracket ===
First round February 20
1	(South Africa) Ernie Els
16	(United States) Jonathan Byrd	6&5
8	(South Africa) Retief Goosen
9	(Argentina) Andrés Romero	2&1
5	(South Africa) Trevor Immelman	1up
12	(Japan) Shingo Katayama
4	(Sweden) Henrik Stenson	1up
13	(Australia) Robert Allenby
6	(Germany) Martin Kaymer
11	(United States) Boo Weekley	2&1
3	(Spain) Sergio García	3&2
14	(Australia) John Senden
7	(Japan) Toru Taniguchi
10	(United States) Woody Austin	6&5
2	(Australia) Adam Scott	2&1
15	(Australia) Brendan Jones

Second round February 21
16	(United States) Jonathan Byrd	6&4
9	(Argentina) Andrés Romero
5	(South Africa) Trevor Immelman
4	(Sweden) Henrik Stenson	25h
11	(United States) Boo Weekley	3&1
3	(Spain) Sergio García
10	(United States) Woody Austin	19h
2	(Australia) Adam Scott

Third round February 22
16	(United States) Jonathan Byrd
4	(Sweden) Henrik Stenson	1up
11	(United States) Boo Weekley
10	(United States) Woody Austin	3&2

Fourth round February 23
4	(Sweden) Henrik Stenson	2up
10	(United States) Woody Austin

=== Gary Player bracket ===
First round February 20
1	(United States) Phil Mickelson	1up
16	(United States) Pat Perez
8	(Australia) Stuart Appleby	3&2
9	(South Africa) Tim Clark
5	(England) Lee Westwood	2&1
12	(United States) Brandt Snedeker
4	(Australia) Geoff Ogilvy
13	(United States) Justin Leonard	3&2
6	(Sweden) Niclas Fasth	6&5
11	(Australia) Richard Green
3	(Fiji) Vijay Singh	19h
14	(Sweden) Peter Hanson
7	(United States) Scott Verplank
10	(Australia) Nick O'Hern	3&2
2	(England) Justin Rose
15	(Australia) Rod Pampling	2&1

Second round February 21
1	(United States) Phil Mickelson
8	(Australia) Stuart Appleby	2&1
5	(England) Lee Westwood
13	(United States) Justin Leonard	2&1
6	(Sweden) Niclas Fasth
3	(Fiji) Vijay Singh	1up
10	(Australia) Nick O'Hern
15	(Australia) Rod Pampling	5&4

Third round February 22
8	(Australia) Stuart Appleby
13	(United States) Justin Leonard	3&2
3	(Fiji) Vijay Singh	25h
15	(Australia) Rod Pampling

Fourth round February 23
13	(United States) Justin Leonard	1up
3	(Fiji) Vijay Singh

=== Sam Snead bracket ===
First round February 20
1	(United States) Steve Stricker	20h
16	(Sweden) Daniel Chopra
8	(South Africa) Richard Sterne
9	(United States) Hunter Mahan	4&3
5	(England) Luke Donald	2&1
12	(England) Nick Dougherty
4	(Argentina) Ángel Cabrera	3&2
13	(Denmark) Anders Hansen
6	(United States) Stewart Cink	4&3
11	(Spain) Miguel Á. Jiménez
3	(Republic of Ireland) Pádraig Harrington	4&3
14	(United States) Jerry Kelly
7	(Canada) Stephen Ames
10	(United States) Charles Howell III	19h
2	(United States) Jim Furyk
15	(Scotland) Colin Montgomerie	3&2

Second round February 21
1	(United States) Steve Stricker	20h
9	(United States) Hunter Mahan
5	(England) Luke Donald
4	(Argentina) Ángel Cabrera	2&1
6	(United States) Stewart Cink	2up
3	(Republic of Ireland) Pádraig Harrington
10	(United States) Charles Howell III
15	(Scotland) Colin Montgomerie	1up

Third round February 22
1	(United States) Steve Stricker
4	(Argentina) Ángel Cabrera	4&3
6	(United States) Stewart Cink	4&2
15	(Scotland) Colin Montgomerie

Fourth round February 23
4	(Argentina) Ángel Cabrera
6	(United States) Stewart Cink	3&2

=== Final Four ===
Semi-finals; February 23
1	(United States) Tiger Woods	2up
4	(Sweden) Henrik Stenson
13	(United States) Justin Leonard
6	(United States) Stewart Cink	4&2

Finals; February 24
1	(United States) Tiger Woods	8&7
6	(United States) Stewart Cink
Third place
4	(Sweden) Henrik Stenson	3&2
13	(United States) Justin Leonard

=== Championship match ===
Player/Hole	1	2	3	4	5	6	7	8	9	10	11	12	13	14	15	16	17	18	19	20	21	22	23	24	25	26	27	28	29
Tiger Woods	4	3	3	4	4	4	3	3	4	4	3	4	4	3	4	3	4	5	4	3	3	4	6	3	3	2	4	4	3
Tiger Woods	AS	1up	1up	1up	2up	2up	3up	4up	4up	4up	5up	4up	4up	4up	4up	3up	4up	4up	4up	5up	5up	5up	5up	6up	7up	8up	8up	7up	8up
Stewart Cink	4	4	3	4	5	4	4	4	4	4	5	3	4	3	4	2	5	5	4	4	3	4	6	4	4	3	4	3	4
Stewart Cink	AS	1dn	1dn	1dn	2dn	2dn	3dn	4dn	4dn	4dn	5dn	4dn	4dn	4dn	4dn	3dn	4dn	4dn	4dn	5dn	5dn	5dn	5dn	6dn	7dn	8dn	8dn	7dn	8dn

Yellow background for eagles.
Red background for birdies.
Blue background for bogeys.

== Prize money breakdown ==
Place	US ($)
Champion	1,350,000
Runner-up	800,000
Third place	575,000
Fourth place	475,000
Losing quarter-finalists x 4	260,000
Losing third round x 8	130,000
Losing second round x 16	90,000
Losing first round x 32	40,000
Total	$8,000,000
