= 2001 PGA Championship =

Coordinates: 34.004°N 84.193°W

Tournament information
- Dates: August 16–19, 2001
- Location: Johns Creek, Georgia
- Course(s): Atlanta Athletic Club, Highlands Course
- Organized by: PGA of America
- Tour(s): PGA Tour; European Tour; Japan Golf Tour

Statistics
- Par: 70
- Length: 7,213 yards (6,596 m)
- Field: 149 players, 76 after cut
- Cut: 141 (+1)
- Prize fund: $5,200,000 €5,822,194
- Winner's share: $936,000 €1,046,978

Champion
- (United States) David Toms
- 265 (−15)

Location in the United States
Location in Georgia

The 2001 PGA Championship was the 83rd PGA Championship, held August 16–19 at the Atlanta Athletic Club in Duluth, Georgia, a suburb northeast of Atlanta. David Toms won his only major championship, one stroke ahead of runner-up Phil Mickelson.

Toms led after 54 holes on the Highlands Course, two strokes ahead of Mickelson. Paired together in the final group, they battled for the lead back-and-forth throughout the day, both in pursuit of their first major. Toms led by one stroke on the 72nd tee, but put his tee shot in the rough. Faced with a long second shot over water, he decided to lay up on the 490-yard (448 m) par-4 and rely on his short game. Toms' third shot stopped 12 feet (3.7 m) left of the pin, and he sank the putt to save par for the win. His 265 total set the record for the lowest score at a major championship.

Two-time defending champion Tiger Woods finished 14 strokes back at 279 (−1), tied for 29th place. No former champions finished in the top twenty.

It was the third major at the Highlands Course, which hosted the PGA Championship in 1981 and the U.S. Open in 1976. All three victors were from the Deep South of the United States. The PGA Championship returned to the course in 2011.

== Course layout ==
Atlanta Athletic Club, Highlands Course

Hole	1	2	3	4	5	6	7	8	9	Out	10	11	12	13	14	15	16	17	18	In	Total
Yards	430	471	469	204	541	425	183	463	416	3,602	439	454	547	364	442	227	441	207	490	3,611	7,213
Par	4	4	4	3	5	4	3	4	4	35	4	4	5	4	4	3	4	3	4	35	70

Lengths of the course for previous majors:

- 7,070 yards (6,465 m), par 70 - 1981 PGA Championship
- 7,015 yards (6,415 m), par 70 - 1976 U.S. Open

== Round summaries ==
=== First round ===
Thursday, August 16, 2001

Place	Player	Score	To par
1	(New Zealand) Grant Waite	64	−6
T2	(Australia) Stuart Appleby	66	−4
T2	(South Korea) K. J. Choi	66	−4
T2	(United States) David Duval	66	−4
T2	(Sweden) Niclas Fasth	66	−4
T2	(United States) Brad Faxon	66	−4
T2	(United States) Fred Funk	66	−4
T2	(United States) Dudley Hart	66	−4
T2	(United States) Phil Mickelson	66	−4
T2	(United States) David Toms	66	−4

=== Second round ===
Friday, August 17, 2001

Place	Player	Score	To par
T1	(Japan) Shingo Katayama	67-64=131	−9
T1	(United States) David Toms	66-65=131	−9
T3	(United States) Bob Estes	67-65=132	−8
T3	(United States) Phil Mickelson	66-66=132	−8
T5	(South Korea) K. J. Choi	66-68=134	−6
T5	(United States) David Duval	66-68=134	−6
T5	(South Africa) Ernie Els	67-67=134	−6
T5	(United States) Jim Furyk	70-64=134	−6
T5	(United States) Dudley Hart	66-68=134	−6
T5	(United States) Steve Lowery	67-67=134	−6

=== Third round ===
Saturday, August 18, 2001

Place	Player	Score	To par
1	(United States) David Toms	66-65-65=196	−14
2	(United States) Phil Mickelson	66-66-66=198	−12
T3	(Japan) Shingo Katayama	67-64-69=200	−10
T3	(United States) Steve Lowery	67-67-66=200	−10
5	(United States) David Duval	66-68-67=201	−9
6	(United States) Davis Love III	71-67-65=203	−7
T7	(Australia) Stuart Appleby	66-70-68=204	−6
T7	(United States) Paul Azinger	68-67-69=204	−6
T7	(South Africa) Ernie Els	67-67-70=204	−6
T10	(United States) Mark Calcavecchia	71-68-66=205	−5
T10	(United States) Jim Furyk	70-64-71=205	−5
T10	(South Africa) Retief Goosen	69-70-66=205	−5
T10	(United States) Mark O'Meara	72-63-70=205	−5

=== Final round ===
Sunday, August 19, 2001

Place	Player	Score	To par	Money (S)
1	(United States) David Toms	66-65-65-69=265	−15	936,000
2	(United States) Phil Mickelson	66-66-66-68=266	−14	562,000
3	(United States) Steve Lowery	67-67-66-68=268	−12	354,000
T4	(United States) Mark Calcavecchia	71-68-66-65=270	−10	222,500
T4	(Japan) Shingo Katayama	67-64-69-70=270	−10	222,500
6	(United States) Billy Andrade	68-70-68-66=272	−8	175,000
T7	(United States) Jim Furyk	70-64-71-69=274	−6	152,333
T7	(United States) Scott Hoch	68-70-69-67=274	−6	152,333
T7	(United States) Scott Verplank	69-68-70-67=274	−6	152,333
T10	(United States) David Duval	66-68-67-74=275	−5	122,000
T10	(United States) Justin Leonard	70-69-67-69=275	−5	122,000
T10	(United States) Kirk Triplett	68-70-71-66=275	−5	122,000

==== Scorecard ====
Final round

Hole	1	2	3	4	5	6	7	8	9	10	11	12	13	14	15	16	17	18
Par	4	4	4	3	5	4	3	4	4	4	4	5	4	4	3	4	3	4
(United States) Toms	−14	−14	−14	−14	−14	−14	−14	−14	−15	−14	−14	−14	−15	−16	−15	−15	−15	−15
(United States) Mickelson	−12	−13	−13	−13	−14	−14	−14	−14	−13	−13	−13	−14	−14	−14	−15	−14	−14	−14
(United States) Lowery	−10	−10	−10	−10	−11	−11	−11	−11	−11	−11	−11	−11	−12	−12	−12	−12	−12	−12
(Japan) Katayama	−10	−10	−11	−11	−11	−11	−11	−12	−12	−12	−12	−13	−12	−11	−11	−11	−11	−10
(United States) Duval	−9	−8	−7	−7	−7	−8	−8	−8	−8	−8	−8	−6	−6	−6	−6	−5	−5	−5
(United States) Love	−7	−7	−7	−6	−7	−7	−7	−6	−5	−5	−5	−2	−2	−1	E	−1	−1	E

Cumulative tournament scores, relative to par

Birdie	Bogey	Double bogey	Triple bogey+
