= 2005 WGC-Accenture Match Play Championship =

Coordinates: 33°05′32.16″N 117°16′01.33″W

Tournament information
- Dates: February 24–27, 2005
- Location: Carlsbad, California
- Course(s): La Costa Resort and Spa
- Tour(s): PGA Tour; European Tour

Statistics
- Par: 72
- Length: 7,277
- Field: 64 players
- Prize fund: $7,500,000
- Winner's share: $1,300,000

Champion
- (United States) David Toms
- def. Chris DiMarco 6 & 5

The 2005 WGC-Accenture Match Play Championship was a golf tournament that was played from February 24–27, 2005 at La Costa Resort and Spa in Carlsbad, California. It was the seventh WGC-Accenture Match Play Championship and the first of four World Golf Championships events held in 2005.

The Championship was due to start on Wednesday February 23 but was delayed by a day because of wet conditions. The first round was played on February 24, while both the second and third rounds were played on February 25.

David Toms won his first World Golf Championships event by defeating Chris DiMarco 6 and 5 in the 36 hole final.

== Brackets ==
The Championship was a single elimination match play event. The field consisted of the top 64 players available from the Official World Golf Rankings, seeded according to the rankings. Ernie Els, ranked number 3, chose not to play the event, so number 65 Shingo Katayama was added to the field.

=== Bobby Jones bracket ===
First round February 24
1	(Fiji) Vijay Singh	4&3
16	(Japan) Shingo Katayama
8	(United States) Jonathan Kaye
9	(United States) Jay Haas	4&2
5	(United States) Justin Leonard
12	(United States) John Daly	1up
4	(United States) Chris DiMarco	1up
13	(United States) Tim Herron
6	(England) Lee Westwood	4&3
11	(United States) Steve Flesch
3	(United States) Davis Love III	1up
14	(United States) Chris Riley
7	(South Korea) K. J. Choi
10	(United States) Tom Lehman	4&2
2	(United States) Stewart Cink	2up
15	(United States) Fred Funk

Second round February 25
1	(Fiji) Vijay Singh
9	(United States) Jay Haas	3&2
12	(United States) John Daly
4	(United States) Chris DiMarco	4&3
6	(England) Lee Westwood
3	(United States) Davis Love III	7&6
10	(United States) Tom Lehman
2	(United States) Stewart Cink	2&1

Third round February 25
9	(United States) Jay Haas
4	(United States) Chris DiMarco	2&1
3	(United States) Davis Love III
2	(United States) Stewart Cink	20h

Fourth round February 26
4	(United States) Chris DiMarco	2&1
2	(United States) Stewart Cink

=== Ben Hogan bracket ===
First round February 24
1	(South Africa) Retief Goosen	1up
16	(Australia) Stephen Leaney
8	(Australia) Peter Lonard
9	(United States) Fred Couples	1up
5	(United States) Chad Campbell	2up
12	(Sweden) Freddie Jacobson
4	(Spain) Miguel Á. Jiménez	3&2
13	(Australia) Rod Pampling
6	(United States) Todd Hamilton	6&5
11	(Australia) Robert Allenby
3	(Northern Ireland) Darren Clarke
14	(Northern Ireland) Graeme McDowell	1up
7	(South Africa) Tim Clark
10	(Australia) Craig Parry	1up
2	(Canada) Mike Weir
15	(United States) Kirk Triplett	1up

Second round February 25
1	(South Africa) Retief Goosen	1up
9	(United States) Fred Couples
5	(United States) Chad Campbell	24h
4	(Spain) Miguel Á. Jiménez
11	(Australia) Robert Allenby	3&2
14	(Northern Ireland) Graeme McDowell
10	(Australia) Craig Parry
15	(United States) Kirk Triplett	5&4

Third round February 25
1	(South Africa) Retief Goosen	19h
5	(United States) Chad Campbell
11	(Australia) Robert Allenby	2&1
15	(United States) Kirk Triplett

Fourth round February 26
1	(South Africa) Retief Goosen	4&3
11	(Australia) Robert Allenby

=== Gary Player bracket ===
First round February 24
1	(United States) Tiger Woods	4&3
16	(Zimbabwe) Nick Price
8	(Australia) Nick O'Hern	19h
9	(United States) Charles Howell III
5	(England) Luke Donald	4&3
12	(United States) Zach Johnson
4	(United States) Kenny Perry	3&2
13	(France) Thomas Levet
6	(United States) Jim Furyk
11	(England) Ian Poulter	3&1
3	(Australia) Stuart Appleby	19h
14	(Sweden) Joakim Haeggman
7	(Denmark) Thomas Bjørn
10	(South Africa) Rory Sabbatini	6&5
2	(Republic of Ireland) Pádraig Harrington	1up
15	(United States) Jeff Maggert

Second round February 25
1	(United States) Tiger Woods
8	(Australia) Nick O'Hern	3&1
5	(England) Luke Donald	1up
4	(United States) Kenny Perry
11	(England) Ian Poulter	1up
3	(Australia) Stuart Appleby
10	(South Africa) Rory Sabbatini	3&1
2	(Republic of Ireland) Pádraig Harrington

Third round February 25
8	(Australia) Nick O'Hern	5&4
5	(England) Luke Donald
11	(England) Ian Poulter	1up
10	(South Africa) Rory Sabbatini

Fourth round February 26
8	(Australia) Nick O'Hern
11	(England) Ian Poulter	3&1

=== Sam Snead bracket ===
First round February 24
1	(United States) Phil Mickelson	3&1
16	(United States) Loren Roberts
8	(Argentina) Ángel Cabrera	4&2
9	(England) Paul Casey
5	(Trinidad and Tobago) Stephen Ames
12	(Australia) Mark Hensby	7&6
4	(United States) David Toms	1up
13	(Australia) Richard Green
6	(Japan) Shigeki Maruyama
11	(England) David Howell	6&5
3	(Australia) Adam Scott	2up
14	(South Africa) Trevor Immelman
7	(United States) Scott Verplank
10	(United States) Jerry Kelly	1up
2	(Spain) Sergio García	4&2
15	(Germany) Alex Čejka

Second round February 25
1	(United States) Phil Mickelson	4&3
8	(Argentina) Angel Cabrera
12	(Australia) Mark Hensby
4	(United States) David Toms	2up
11	(England) David Howell
3	(Australia) Adam Scott	2&1
10	(United States) Jerry Kelly
2	(Spain) Sergio García	19h

Third round February 25
1	(United States) Phil Mickelson
4	(United States) David Toms	4&2
3	(Australia) Adam Scott	4&3
2	(Spain) Sergio García

Fourth round February 26
4	(United States) David Toms	2&1
3	(Australia) Adam Scott

=== Final Four ===
Semi-finals; February 26
4	(United States) Chris DiMarco	2&1
1	(South Africa) Retief Goosen
11	(England) Ian Poulter
4	(United States) David Toms	3&2

Finals; February 27
4	(United States) Chris DiMarco
4	(United States) David Toms	6&5
Third place
1	(South Africa) Retief Goosen	20h
11	(England) Ian Poulter

== Prize money breakdown ==
Place	US ($)
Champion	1,300,000
Runner-up	750,000
Third place	560,000
Fourth place	450,000
Losing quarter-finalists x 4	240,000
Losing third round x 8	125,000
Losing second round x 16	85,000
Losing first round x 32	35,000
Total	$7,500,000
