= David Toms =

American professional golfer (born 1967)

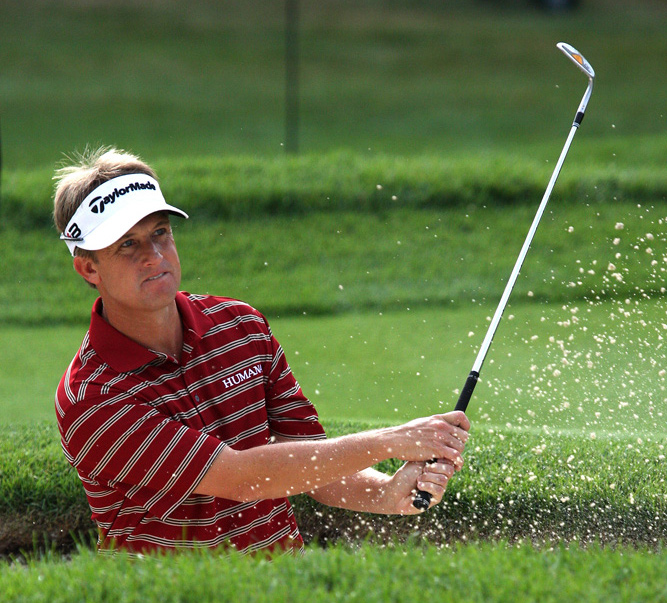
- Toms at the 2008 PGA Championship

Personal information
- Full name: David Wayne Toms
- Nationality: United States
- Born: January 4, 1967 (age 59) Monroe, Louisiana, U.S.
- Height: 5 ft 10 in (1.78 m)
- Weight: 160 lb (73 kg)
- Spouse: Sonya Toms
- Children: 2

Career
- Sport: Golf
- College: Louisiana State University
- Turned professional: 1989
- Current tour: PGA Tour Champions
- Former tours: PGA Tour; Nike Tour; T. C. Jordan Tour
- Professional wins: 23
- Highest ranking: 5 (November 3, 2002)

Number of wins by tour
- PGA Tour: 13
- European Tour: 2
- Korn Ferry Tour: 2
- PGA Tour Champions: 5
- European Senior Tour: 1
- Other: 3

Best results in major championships (wins: 1)
- Masters Tournament: T6: 1998
- PGA Championship: Won: 2001
- U.S. Open: T4: 2012
- The Open Championship: T4: 2000

Achievements and awards
- Payne Stewart Award: 2011

David Wayne Toms (born January 4, 1967) is an American professional golfer who currently plays on the PGA Tour Champions. From 1992 to 2017, Toms was a member of the PGA Tour, where he won 13 events, including one major, the 2001 PGA Championship. He was in the top 10 of the Official World Golf Ranking for 175 weeks between 2001 and 2006, and ranked as high as fifth in 2002 and 2003.

== Early life and amateur career ==
Toms was born in Monroe in northeastern Louisiana. He is the son of Thomas Edward "Buster" Toms from Minden in northwestern Louisiana. Toms won the 15-17 Boys' event at the 1984 Junior World Golf Championships. Toms also played little league baseball with future Major League Baseball players Albert Belle and Ben McDonald. After graduating from Airline High School in Bossier City, Louisiana, he attended Louisiana State University in Baton Rouge, and was a member of the golf team.

== Professional career ==
=== 1989–98: early years and first win ===
In 1991, Toms finished T23 at the PGA Tour qualifying school to earn his first full tour card for the 1992 season. Toms made his first three cuts on tour including a third-place finish at the Northern Telecom Open, although this was the only top 10 he would earn all season. The following season was also a struggle for Toms as he made just 12 of 32 cuts for the season, of which three were top-10 finishes. In 1994, Toms' lack of success continued on the PGA Tour and he lost his playing rights for the 1995 season.

In 1995, Toms played the entire season on the Nike Tour (now the Korn Ferry Tour) with greater success, winning two tournaments, the Greater Greenville Classic and the Wichita Open. This success earned Toms his PGA Tour card for the 1996 season.

Upon his return to the PGA Tour in 1996, Toms had a disappointing season with just two top 10s. However, he did manage to qualify for his first major championship of his career at the 1996 U.S. Open, where he missed the cut.

In 1997, Toms won his first PGA Tour event at the Quad City Classic, winning by three strokes over Brandel Chamblee. He followed this success in the 1998 season with a runner-up finish at the Tucson Chrysler Classic. At his first visit to Augusta National, he recorded his best finish in a major championship at the time with a T-6 at the Masters. In his defense of the Quad City Classic title, Toms finished fourth.

=== 1999–2000: three more wins ===
In 1999, Toms enjoyed seven top-10 finishes on the PGA Tour. In September, he won his second title at the Sprint International, by three strokes over David Duval. Toms almost added another title the following week when he narrowly missed out at the Reno-Tahoe Open, finishing in T-2 behind Notah Begay III. Toms did, however, win his third PGA Tour title a month later at the Buick Challenge, defeating Stuart Appleby by three strokes.

In 2000, Toms made 26 of 31 cuts, including a tie for fourth at The Open Championship. He won the Michelob Championship at Kingsmill, defeating Canadian Mike Weir in a sudden-death playoff, giving Toms his fourth Tour victory.

=== 2001: PGA Championship ===
The standout year of Toms' career came in 2001. He had nine top-10 finishes and three wins on tour, one of which was his first major championship. Toms won the Compaq Classic of New Orleans by two strokes over Phil Mickelson for his fifth PGA Tour title. That summer, Toms won a major, the PGA Championship, by one stroke over Mickelson. His winning score of 265 in the 2001 PGA Championship was the lowest absolute 72-hole score ever recorded in a major championship, until Henrik Stenson shot 264 in the 2016 Open Championship. Toms followed up his first major win by successfully defending his title at the Michelob Championship at Kingsmill. At the last event of the year, Toms entered a four-man playoff at The Tour Championship where he, Sergio García and Ernie Els lost on the first extra hole to Mike Weir.

=== 2002–06: five more wins ===
In 2002, Toms lost in a playoff at the season opening Mercedes Championship to García when the Spaniard made birdie on the first extra hole. He did record a further 12 top-10 finishes with runner -up finishes at the MasterCard Colonial and the Buick Challenge followed by a sole third-place finish at The Tour Championship.

Toms finished runner-up at the WGC-Accenture Match Play Championship in 2003 to Tiger Woods, losing 2&1, and also finished tied for eighth at The Masters. At the Wachovia Championship, he won his eighth PGA Tour title, by two strokes over Robert Gamez, and then recorded his best showing ever at the U.S. Open, finishing T-5. A few weeks later, Toms won his ninth PGA Tour title at the FedEx St. Jude Classic by three strokes over Nick Price.

In 2004, he defended his FedEx St. Jude Classic by finishing six strokes clear of American Bob Estes for his 10th victory on the PGA Tour. Despite this win, Toms endured a steady yet unspectacular season earning over 2.3 million dollars.

Toms enjoyed a much better start to the 2005 season in which he had top-10 finishes in five of his first seven events, including a win at the WGC-Accenture Match Play Championship to record his first World Golf Championship victory. He defeated fellow American Chris DiMarco 6&5 in the 36-hole final on Sunday for his 11th PGA Tour win. Along the way, Toms defeated notables including Phil Mickelson, Adam Scott and Ian Poulter. Later in the season, he almost defended his FedEx St. Jude Classic title for a third successive year but finished one stroke behind Justin Leonard.

Early in 2006, Toms won his 12th PGA Tour title at the Sony Open in Hawaii, finishing five strokes ahead of Chad Campbell and Rory Sabbatini. He followed up this early season form with a T-2 finish at the Ford Championship at Doral behind Tiger Woods and then a T-3 finish a week later at The Honda Classic. Toms' form dipped during the rest of season, only recording a further two top-10 finishes.

=== 2007–12: injuries and comeback ===
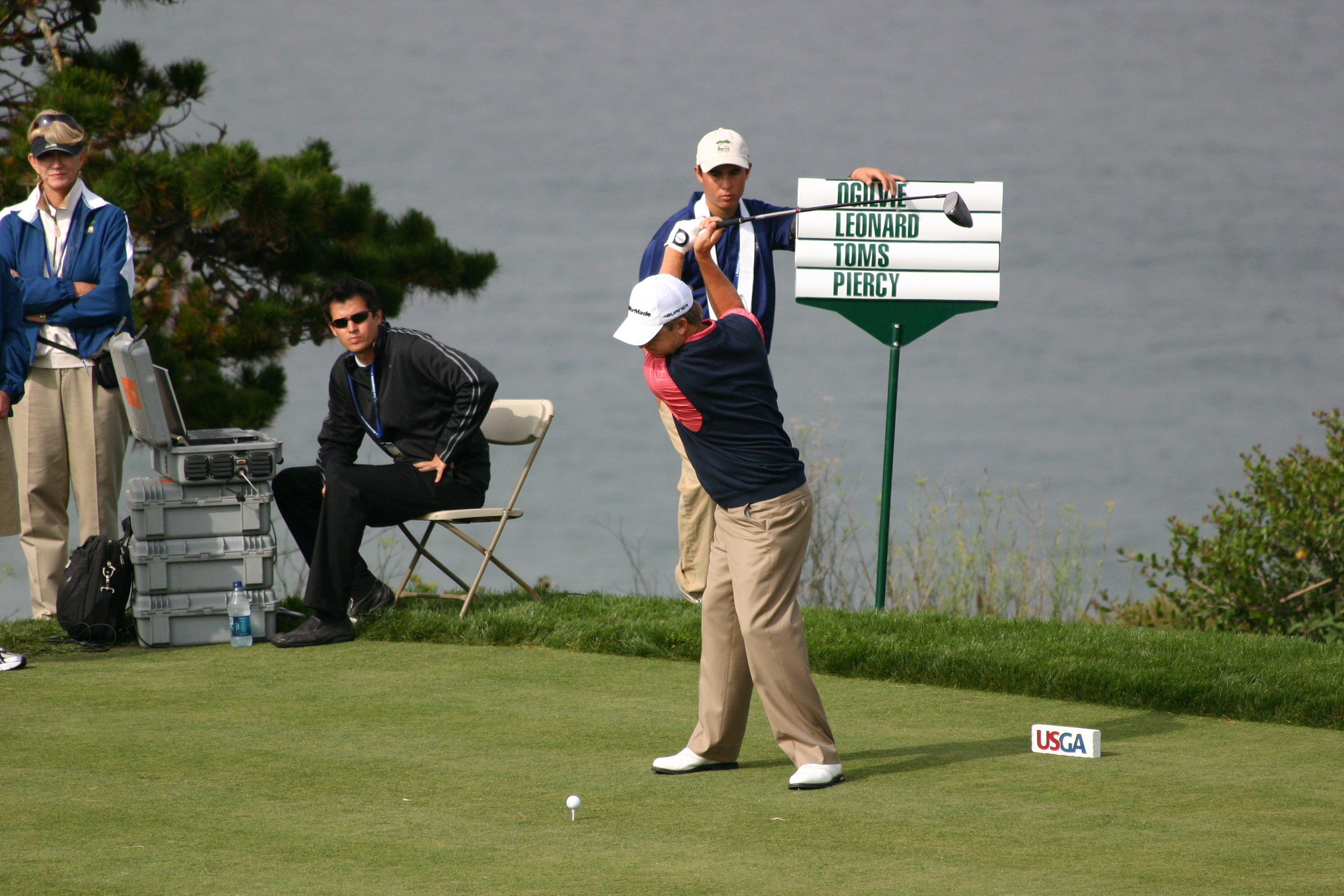
Toms at the 2008 U.S. Open.

In 2007, Toms had solid season with a succession of top-10 finishes, most notably a ninth-place finish at The Masters and an equal-best T-5 at the U.S. Open. Toms made just over $2 million in prize money and finished 33rd in the FedEx Cup standings.

Toms struggled during the 2008 season with injuries that forced him to miss large parts of the season and underperform. He only participated in 20 events during the season with only one top 10. He finished the season 136th on the FedEx Cup standings, making just under $800,000.

Toms enjoyed a much better season in 2009, with three runner-up finishes at the Sony Open in Hawaii, St. Jude Classic and the Travelers Championship amongst four other top-10 finishes. This form earned Toms a place in the season-ending The Tour Championship. He would finish 19th in the FedEx Cup standings with earnings over $3 million.

In 2010, Toms had just two top-10 finishes, his best placing coming at the Wyndham Championship where he finished in second place, one stroke behind winner Arjun Atwal. Toms made it to the third FedEx Cup playoff event the BMW Championship but did not make it into the top 30 to advance and eventually finished the season 55th in the standings.

Toms started the 2011 season well with a T-5 at the Mayakoba Golf Classic at Riviera Maya-Cancun and a T-3 at the Arnold Palmer Invitational. Toms then came close to his first PGA Tour win in five years at The Players Championship where he eventually lost on the first extra hole to South Korean K. J. Choi. This came despite leading the tournament for the majority of rounds two, three and four. Toms held the lead for the entire final round until he reached the par five 16th hole where he found the water with his second shot. This enabled Choi to take a one shot lead down the 18th hole; however Toms would make a birdie to Choi's par to take the event into a sudden-death playoff. At the first extra hole, the 17th, both players found the green with their tee shots. They would both go on to run their birdie attempts past the hole, but Toms would also see his par putt lip out from four feet, allowing Choi to make a three-foot putt for the victory.

Toms bounced back the week after his playoff loss to win the Crowne Plaza Invitational at Colonial by one shot over Charlie Wi. Toms tied the PGA Tour scoring record for 36 holes after shooting a pair of 8-under-par 62s for a seven shot lead at the halfway stage. Toms' lead disappeared after a third round 74 when he trailed Wi by one stroke entering the final round. However, in the final round he shot a 67, which included a holed-out eagle from the fairway on the 11th hole for a one stroke victory. This was Toms' first win in over five years on the PGA Tour. The win guaranteed Toms a place in the U.S. Open and moved him up to 28th in the Official World Golf Ranking.

In June 2012, Toms recorded his best-ever performance in a U.S. Open when he finished T-4. Toms had been one of the co-leaders after 36 holes at one under par alongside fellow Americans Tiger Woods and Jim Furyk, but his challenge fell apart on day three when he found himself five over for his first six holes on his way to a 76. Toms did perform well on Sunday with a two-under round of 68, but fell short by two strokes.

== Other ventures ==
=== Golf course design ===
Toms owns a golf course design business, which he describes as what he plans to do after his playing days are over. His early works, all in Louisiana, were as a player-consultant, and in renovation and redesign of existing courses. The first course for which he was the lead designer was Carter Plantation in Springfield, Louisiana.

=== Philanthropy ===
In 2003, Toms created the David Toms Foundation for the purpose of helping underprivileged, abused and abandoned children. Grants are made to programs that are designed to bolster a child's self-esteem, and help him or her develop into a productive citizen. His foundation raised more than $1.5 million for Hurricane Katrina relief. For his efforts, Toms shared the 2006 Golf Writers Association of America's Charlie Bennett Award with fellow Louisianans Kelly Gibson and Hal Sutton. In 2013, the foundation partnered with AdvoCare to support Holy Angels, a Louisiana non-profit, helping those with developmental disabilities.

== Personal life ==
Toms resides in Shreveport in northwestern Louisiana. He and wife, Sonya, have two children, Carter and Anna. In 2015, his son Carter signed to play for Louisiana State University. In 2005, Toms had a heart surgery with ablation to try to correct nerves causing a rapid heartbeat.

== Professional wins (23) ==
=== PGA Tour wins (13) ===
Legend
Major championships (1)
World Golf Championships (1)
Other PGA Tour (11)

No.	Date	Tournament	Winning score	To par	Margin of victory	Runner(s)-up
1	Jul 13, 1997	Quad City Classic	67-66-67-65=265	−15	3 strokes	(United States) Brandel Chamblee, (United States) Robert Gamez, (United States) Jimmy Johnston
2	Aug 22, 1999	Sprint International	47 pts (16-13-10-8=47)		3 points	(United States) David Duval
3	Oct 3, 1999	Buick Challenge	68-66-66-71=271	−17	3 strokes	(Australia) Stuart Appleby
4	Oct 8, 2000	Michelob Championship at Kingsmill	68-70-67-66=271	−13	Playoff	(Canada) Mike Weir
5	May 6, 2001	Compaq Classic of New Orleans	66-73-63-64=266	−22	2 strokes	(United States) Phil Mickelson
6	Aug 19, 2001	PGA Championship	66-65-65-69=265	−15	1 stroke	(United States) Phil Mickelson
7	Oct 7, 2001	Michelob Championship at Kingsmill (2)	64-70-67-68=269	−15	1 stroke	(United States) Kirk Triplett
8	May 11, 2003	Wachovia Championship	70-69-66-73=278	−10	2 strokes	(United States) Robert Gamez, (United States) Brent Geiberger, (Fiji) Vijay Singh
9	Jun 29, 2003	FedEx St. Jude Classic	68-67-65-64=264	−20	3 strokes	(Zimbabwe) Nick Price
10	May 30, 2004	FedEx St. Jude Classic (2)	67-63-65-73=268	−16	6 strokes	(United States) Bob Estes
11	Feb 27, 2005	WGC-Accenture Match Play Championship	6 and 5			(United States) Chris DiMarco
12	Jan 15, 2006	Sony Open in Hawaii	66-69-61-65=261	−19	5 strokes	(United States) Chad Campbell, (South Africa) Rory Sabbatini
13	May 22, 2011	Crowne Plaza Invitational at Colonial	62-62-74-67=265	−15	1 stroke	(South Korea) Charlie Wi

PGA Tour playoff record (1–3)

No.	Year	Tournament	Opponent(s)	Result
1	2000	Michelob Championship at Kingsmill	(Canada) Mike Weir	Won with par on first extra hole
2	2001	The Tour Championship	(South Africa) Ernie Els, (Spain) Sergio García, (Canada) Mike Weir	Weir won with birdie on first extra hole
3	2002	Mercedes Championships	(Spain) Sergio García	Lost to birdie on first extra hole
4	2011	The Players Championship	(South Korea) K. J. Choi	Lost to par on first extra hole

=== Nike Tour wins (2) ===
No.	Date	Tournament	Winning score	To par	Margin of victory	Runner-up
1	May 28, 1995	Nike Greater Greenville Classic	67-66-68-66=267	−19	Playoff	(United States) Tom Scherrer
2	Jul 30, 1995	Nike Wichita Open	67-67-68-67=269	−19	Playoff	(United States) E. J. Pfister

Nike Tour playoff record (2–1)

No.	Year	Tournament	Opponent	Result
1	1990	Ben Hogan Lake City Classic	(United States) Jim McGovern	Lost to par on fourth extra hole
2	1995	Nike Greater Greenville Classic	(United States) Tom Scherrer	Won with birdie on first extra hole
3	1995	Nike Wichita Open	(United States) E. J. Pfister	Won with eagle on second extra hole

=== T. C. Jordan Tour wins (1) ===
No.	Date	Tournament	Winning score	To par	Margin of victory	Runner-up
1	Jul 7, 1991	Griffin Gate Classic	61-66-68-70=265	−15	Playoff	(United States) Jack Ferenz

=== Other wins (2) ===
No.	Date	Tournament	Winning score	To par	Margin of victory	Runners-up
1	Nov 14, 1999	Hassan II Golf Trophy	68-70-68-69=275	−17	Playoff	(Spain) Miguel Ángel Martín, (United States) Chris Perry
2	Jun 23, 2009	CVS Caremark Charity Classic (with (Zimbabwe) Nick Price)	66-60=126	−16	3 strokes	(United States) Laura Diaz and (United States) Matt Kuchar

Other playoff record (1–1)

No.	Year	Tournament	Opponents	Result
1	1999	Hassan II Golf Trophy	(Spain) Miguel Ángel Martín, (United States) Chris Perry	
2	2002	CVS Charity Classic (with (United States) Stewart Cink)	(United States) Chris DiMarco and (United States) Dudley Hart	Lost to birdie on third extra hole

=== PGA Tour Champions wins (5) ===
Legend
Senior major championships (1)
Other PGA Tour Champions (4)

No.	Date	Tournament	Winning score	Margin of victory	Runner(s)-up
1	Jul 1, 2018	U.S. Senior Open	−3 (70-71-66-70=277)	1 stroke	(Spain) Miguel Ángel Jiménez, (United States) Jerry Kelly, (United States) Tim Petrovic
2	Sep 12, 2021	Ascension Charity Classic	−10 (68-69-66=203)	Playoff	(United States) Dicky Pride
3	Mar 5, 2023	Cologuard Classic	−15 (68-65-68=201)	1 stroke	(Sweden) Robert Karlsson
4	Mar 26, 2023	Galleri Classic	−16 (65-70-65=200)	4 strokes	(New Zealand) Steven Alker
5	Feb 15, 2026	Chubb Classic	−13 (67-63-73=203)	1 stroke	(United States) Justin Leonard, (United States) Boo Weekley, (Australia) Michael Wright

PGA Tour Champions playoff record (1–0)

No.	Year	Tournament	Opponent	Result
1	2021	Ascension Charity Classic	(United States) Dicky Pride	Won with par on first extra hole

== Major championships ==
=== Wins (1) ===
Year	Championship	54 holes	Winning score	Margin	Runner-up
2001	PGA Championship	2 shot lead	−15 (66-65-65-69=265)	1 stroke	(United States) Phil Mickelson

=== Results timeline ===
Tournament	1996	1997	1998	1999
Masters Tournament			T6	CUT
U.S. Open	CUT	WD		CUT
The Open Championship				
PGA Championship		CUT	CUT	CUT

Tournament	2000	2001	2002	2003	2004	2005	2006	2007	2008	2009
Masters Tournament	T49	T31	T36	T8	CUT	CUT	CUT	9	T42	
U.S. Open	T16	T66	T45	T5	T20	T15	WD	T5	T60	CUT
The Open Championship	T4	CUT	83	CUT	T30	DQ		CUT		CUT
PGA Championship	T41	1	CUT	T29	T17	T10	T16	T42	T15	T36

Tournament	2010	2011	2012	2013	2014	2015	2016	2017	2018
Masters Tournament	T14	T24	T50	T13					
U.S. Open	T33	CUT	T4	CUT	CUT		CUT		
The Open Championship									
PGA Championship	T33	T4	T42	7		CUT	CUT		

Tournament	2019
Masters Tournament	
PGA Championship	
U.S. Open	CUT
The Open Championship	

Win
Top 10
Did not play

CUT = missed the half-way cut
WD = withdrew
DQ = disqualified
"T" = tied for place

=== Summary ===
Tournament	Wins	2nd	3rd	Top-5	Top-10	Top-25	Events	Cuts made
Masters Tournament	0	0	0	0	3	6	15	11
PGA Championship	1	0	0	2	4	7	19	13
U.S. Open	0	0	0	3	3	6	20	10
The Open Championship	0	0	0	1	1	1	8	3
Totals	1	0	0	6	11	20	62	37

- Most consecutive cuts made – 6 (2000 Masters – 2001 U.S. Open)
- Longest streak of top-10s – 2 (twice)

== Results in The Players Championship ==
Tournament	1992	1993	1994	1995	1996	1997	1998	1999
The Players Championship	CUT	CUT	CUT		CUT	CUT	CUT	T20

Tournament	2000	2001	2002	2003	2004	2005	2006	2007	2008	2009
The Players Championship	T38	T12	T19	CUT	CUT	T68	CUT	T64	T32	T9

Tournament	2010	2011	2012	2013	2014	2015
The Players Championship	CUT	2	T10	CUT		T13

Top 10
Did not play

CUT = missed the halfway cut
"T" indicates a tie for a place

== World Golf Championships ==
=== Wins (1) ===
Year	Championship	54 holes	Winning score	Margin	Runner-up
2005	WGC-Accenture Match Play Championship	n/a	6 and 5		(United States) Chris DiMarco

=== Results timeline ===
Tournament	1999	2000	2001	2002	2003	2004	2005	2006	2007	2008	2009	2010	2011	2012	2013
Match Play		R32	R32	QF	2	R16	1	R16	R16	R32		R64		R32	R64
Championship	T11	T25	NT^{1}	T4	5	T13	T6	53	T45			T50		WD	
Invitational			T13	T15	T33	T6	T9	T8	T61	T48	T22		T9	T8	
Champions													T59		

^{1}Cancelled due to 9/11

Win
Top 10
Did not play

QF, R16, R32, R64 = Round in which player lost in match play
"T" = Tied
NT = No tournament
WD = Withdrew
Note that the HSBC Champions did not become a WGC event until 2009.

== Senior major championships ==
=== Wins (1) ===
Year	Championship	54 holes	Winning score	Margin	Runners-up
2018	U.S. Senior Open	1 shot lead	−3 (70-71-66-70=277)	1 stroke	(Spain) Miguel Ángel Jiménez, (United States) Jerry Kelly, (United States) Tim Petrovic

=== Results timeline ===
Results not in chronological order.

Tournament	2017	2018	2019	2020	2021	2022	2023	2024	2025	2026
Senior PGA Championship	7	T10		NT	T50	CUT	T15		T61	T27
The Tradition	T6	T27	T2	NT	T29	T9		T46	T46	T39
U.S. Senior Open	CUT	1	T2	NT	T28	T11	T18	CUT	T45	CUT
Senior Players Championship	T31	T28	T46	T33	T3	9	2		T48	T53
The Senior Open Championship		T32		NT						

Win
Top 10
Did not play

CUT = missed the halfway cut
"T" indicates a tie for a place
NT = no tournament due to COVID-19 pandemic

== U.S. national team professional appearances ==
- Ryder Cup: 2002, 2004, 2006
- World Cup: 2002
- Presidents Cup: 2003 (tie), 2005 (winners), 2007 (winners), 2011 (winners)

== See also ==
- 1991 PGA Tour Qualifying School graduates
- 1995 Nike Tour graduates
- List of men's major championships winning golfers
