= 1995 Masters Tournament =

American golf tournament held in 1995

- Front cover of the 1995 Masters Journal

Tournament information
- Dates: April 6–9, 1995
- Location: Augusta, Georgia; 33.503°N 82.020°W
- Course: Augusta National Golf Club
- Organized by: Augusta National Golf Club
- Tour: PGA Tour

Statistics
- Par: 72
- Length: 6,925 yards (6,332 m)
- Field: 86 players, 47 after cut
- Cut: 145 (+1)
- Prize fund: US$2.2 million
- Winner's share: $396,000

Champion
- (United States) Ben Crenshaw
- 274 (−14)

Location map
- Location in the United States Location in Georgia

The 1995 Masters Tournament was the 59th Masters Tournament, held April 6–9 at Augusta National Golf Club in Augusta, Georgia. Ben Crenshaw won his second Masters championship, one stroke ahead of runner-up Davis Love III. It was an emotional victory for Crenshaw as it came just days after the death of his mentor, Harvey Penick. Crenshaw and Tom Kite attended the funeral in Texas on Wednesday and did not return to Augusta until that night, on the eve of the first round.

The 1995 Masters marked the first major championship for Tiger Woods, who qualified as the 1994 U.S. Amateur champion. A 19-year-old college freshman at Stanford, he tied for 41st place and was the leading amateur, the only one to make the cut. Woods' average driving distance was the longest in the tournament.

== Field ==
1. Masters champions

Seve Ballesteros (9), Gay Brewer, Billy Casper, Charles Coody, Fred Couples (10,12,13), Ben Crenshaw (9,13), Nick Faldo (3,11,12), Raymond Floyd (9), Doug Ford, Bernhard Langer, Sandy Lyle, Larry Mize (9), Jack Nicklaus, José María Olazábal (11,12,13), Arnold Palmer, Gary Player, Craig Stadler, Tom Watson (9,10), Ian Woosnam, Fuzzy Zoeller (13)

- Tommy Aaron, George Archer, Jack Burke Jr., Bob Goalby, Ben Hogan, Herman Keiser, Cary Middlecoff, Byron Nelson, Henry Picard, Gene Sarazen, Sam Snead, and Art Wall Jr. did not play.

2. U.S. Open champions (last five years)

Ernie Els (9,13), Hale Irwin (9,12,13), Lee Janzen (12), Tom Kite (9,13), Payne Stewart

3. The Open champions (last five years)

Ian Baker-Finch (9), Greg Norman (9,10,11,13), Nick Price (4,12,13)

4. PGA champions (last five years)

Paul Azinger, John Daly (12), Wayne Grady

5. U.S. Amateur champion and runner-up

Trip Kuehne (a), Tiger Woods (a)

6. The Amateur champion

Lee S. James (a)

7. U.S. Amateur Public Links champion

Guy Yamamoto (a)

8. U.S. Mid-Amateur champion

Tim Jackson (a)

9. Top 24 players and ties from the 1994 Masters

Chip Beck, Brad Faxon (13), David Edwards (10), Dan Forsman, Bill Glasson (13), Jay Haas (13), John Huston (13), Tom Lehman (12,13), Jim McGovern (10), Mark O'Meara (12), Corey Pavin (11,12,13), Loren Roberts (10,12,13), Lanny Wadkins

10. Top 16 players and ties from the 1994 U.S. Open

John Cook (11), Clark Dennis, Scott Hoch (13), Steve Lowery (12,13), Jeff Maggert (13), Colin Montgomerie, Frank Nobilo, Jeff Sluman, Curtis Strange, Duffy Waldorf

11. Top eight players and ties from 1994 PGA Championship

Steve Elkington (12), Phil Mickelson (12,13)

12. Winners of PGA Tour events since the previous Masters

Mark Brooks, Bob Estes (13), Rick Fehr (13), David Frost (13), Mike Heinen, Brian Henninger, Peter Jacobsen, Neal Lancaster, Bruce Lietzke (13), Davis Love III, Mark McCumber (13), John Morse, Kenny Perry (13), Dicky Pride, Vijay Singh, Mike Springer (13), Mike Sullivan

13. Top 30 players from the 1994 PGA Tour money list

Brad Bryant, Mark Calcavecchia, Hal Sutton

14. Special foreign invitation

David Gilford, Miguel Ángel Jiménez, Mark McNulty, Tsuneyuki Nakajima, Masashi Ozaki

== Round summaries ==
=== First round ===
Thursday, April 6, 1995

Place	Player	Score	To par
T1	(South Africa) David Frost	66	−6
T1	(United States) Phil Mickelson	66	−6
T1	(Spain) José María Olazábal	66	−6
T4	(England) David Gilford	67	−5
T4	(United States) Jack Nicklaus	67	−5
T4	(United States) Corey Pavin	67	−5
T7	(United States) Chip Beck	68	−4
T7	(United States) Mark O'Meara	68	−4
T9	(United States) David Edwards	69	−3
T9	(Australia) Wayne Grady	69	−3
T9	(United States) Scott Hoch	69	−3
T9	(United States) Hale Irwin	69	−3
T9	(United States) Lee Janzen	69	−3
T9	(United States) Davis Love III	69	−3
T9	(Wales) Ian Woosnam	69	−3

=== Second round ===
Friday, April 7, 1995

Place	Player	Score	To par
1	(United States) Jay Haas	71-64=135	−9
T2	(United States) Scott Hoch	69-67=136	−8
T2	(United States) John Huston	70-66=136	−8
T4	(United States) Ben Crenshaw	70-67=137	−7
T4	(South Africa) David Frost	66-71=137	−7
T4	(United States) Phil Mickelson	66-71=137	−7
T7	(United States) Brian Henninger	70-68=138	−6
T7	(United States) Lee Janzen	69-69=138	−6
T7	(United States) Davis Love III	69-69=138	−6
T7	(United States) Corey Pavin	67-71=138	−6

Amateurs: Woods (E), Jackson (+11), Kuehne (+11), James (+13), Yamamoto (+17)

=== Third round ===
Saturday, April 8, 1995

Place	Player	Score	To par
T1	(United States) Ben Crenshaw	70-67-69=206	−10
T1	(United States) Brian Henninger	70-68-68=206	−10
T3	(United States) Fred Couples	71-69-67=207	−9
T3	(Australia) Steve Elkington	73-67-67=207	−9
T3	(United States) Jay Haas	71-64-72=207	−9
T3	(United States) Scott Hoch	69-67-71=207	−9
T3	(United States) Phil Mickelson	66-71-70=207	−9
T8	(South Africa) David Frost	66-71-71=208	−8
T8	(United States) John Huston	70-66-72=208	−8
T8	(United States) Curtis Strange	72-71-65=208	−8

=== Final round ===
Sunday, April 9, 1995

==== Final leaderboard ====
Champion
Silver Cup winner (low amateur)
(a) = amateur
(c) = past champion

Top 10
Place	Player	Score	To par	Money (US$)
1	(United States) Ben Crenshaw (c)	70-67-69-68=274	−14	396,000
2	(United States) Davis Love III	69-69-71-66=275	−13	237,600
T3	(United States) Jay Haas	71-64-72-70=277	−11	127,600
T3	(Australia) Greg Norman	73-68-68-68=277	−11	127,600
T5	(Australia) Steve Elkington	73-67-67-72=279	−9	83,600
T5	(South Africa) David Frost	66-71-71-71=279	−9	83,600
T7	(United States) Scott Hoch	69-67-71-73=280	−8	70,950
T7	(United States) Phil Mickelson	66-71-70-73=280	−8	70,950
9	(United States) Curtis Strange	72-71-65-73=281	−7	63,800
T10	(United States) Fred Couples (c)	71-69-67-75=282	−6	57,200
T10	(United States) Brian Henninger	70-68-68-76=282	−6	57,200

Leaderboard below the top 10
Place	Player	Score	To par	Money ($)
T12	(United States) Lee Janzen	69-69-74-71=283	−5	48,400
T12	(United States) Kenny Perry	73-70-71-69=283	−5	48,400
T14	(United States) Hale Irwin	69-72-71-72=284	−4	39,600
T14	(Spain) José María Olazábal (c)	66-74-72-72=284	−4	39,600
T14	(United States) Tom Watson (c)	73-70-69-72=284	−4	39,600
T17	(United States) Paul Azinger	70-72-73-70=285	−3	28,786
T17	(United States) Brad Faxon	76-69-69-71=285	−3	28,786
T17	(United States) Raymond Floyd (c)	71-70-70-74=285	−3	28,786
T17	(United States) John Huston	70-66-72-77=285	−3	28,786
T17	(Scotland) Colin Montgomerie	71-69-76-69=285	−3	28,786
T17	(United States) Corey Pavin	67-71-72-75=285	−3	28,786
T17	(Wales) Ian Woosnam (c)	69-72-71-73=285	−3	28,786
T24	(United States) David Edwards	69-73-73-71=286	−2	18,260
T24	(England) Nick Faldo (c)	70-70-71-75=286	−2	18,260
T24	(England) David Gilford	67-73-75-71=286	−2	18,260
T24	(United States) Loren Roberts	72-69-72-73=286	−2	18,260
T24	(United States) Duffy Waldorf	74-69-67-76=286	−2	18,260
T29	(United States) Bob Estes	73-70-76-68=287	−1	15,300
T29	(Japan) Masashi Ozaki	70-74-70-73=287	−1	15,300
T31	(United States) Peter Jacobsen	72-73-69-74=288	E	13,325
T31	(Germany) Bernhard Langer (c)	71-69-73-75=288	E	13,325
T31	(United States) Bruce Lietzke	72-71-71-74=288	E	13,325
T31	(United States) Mark O'Meara	68-72-71-77=288	E	13,325
T35	(United States) Chip Beck	68-76-69-77=290	+2	10,840
T35	(United States) Dan Forsman	71-74-74-71=290	+2	10,840
T35	(Australia) Wayne Grady	69-73-74-74=290	+2	10,840
T35	(United States) Mark McCumber	73-69-69-79=290	+2	10,840
T35	(United States) Jack Nicklaus (c)	67-78-70-75=290	+2	10,840
40	(United States) Tom Lehman	71-72-74-75=292	+4	9,500
T41	(United States) Mark Calcavecchia	70-72-78-73=293	+5	8,567
T41	(United States) Jeff Sluman	73-72-71-77=293	+5	8,567
T41	(United States) Payne Stewart	71-72-72-78=293	+5	8,567
T41	(United States) Tiger Woods (a)	72-72-77-72=293	+5	0
T45	(Spain) Seve Ballesteros (c)	75-68-78-75=296	+8	7,500
T45	(United States) John Daly	75-69-71-81=296	+8	7,500
47	(United States) Rick Fehr	76-69-69-83=297	+9	6,800
CUT	(United States) Clark Dennis	73-73=146	+2	
CUT	(Spain) Miguel Ángel Jiménez	71-75=146	+2	
CUT	(Scotland) Sandy Lyle (c)	75-71=146	+2	
CUT	(Japan) Tsuneyuki Nakajima	72-74=146	+2	
CUT	(United States) Craig Stadler (c)	70-76=146	+2	
CUT	(United States) Hal Sutton	77-69=146	+2	
CUT	(United States) Fuzzy Zoeller (c)	72-74=146	+2	
CUT	(United States) Brad Bryant	77-70=147	+3	
CUT	(United States) Charles Coody (c)	74-73=147	+3	
CUT	(United States) John Cook	73-74=147	+3	
CUT	(South Africa) Ernie Els	72-75=147	+3	
CUT	(United States) Mike Heinen	73-74=147	+3	
CUT	(United States) Tom Kite	74-73=147	+3	
CUT	(United States) Larry Mize (c)	76-71=147	+3	
CUT	(United States) Mike Sullivan	72-75=147	+3	
CUT	(United States) Steve Lowery	75-73=148	+4	
CUT	(United States) Jeff Maggert	78-70=148	+4	
CUT	(Zimbabwe) Mark McNulty	75-73=148	+4	
CUT	(United States) John Morse	74-74=148	+4	
CUT	(Fiji) Vijay Singh	77-71=148	+4	
CUT	(United States) Gay Brewer (c)	79-70=149	+5	
CUT	(South Africa) Gary Player (c)	76-73=149	+5	
CUT	(Zimbabwe) Nick Price	76-73=149	+5	
CUT	(United States) Lanny Wadkins	74-75=149	+5	
CUT	(United States) Jim McGovern	77-73=150	+6	
CUT	(United States) Bill Glasson	71-80=151	+7	
CUT	(United States) Neal Lancaster	74-77=151	+7	
CUT	(United States) Arnold Palmer (c)	79-73=152	+8	
CUT	(United States) Dicky Pride	79-73=152	+8	
CUT	(United States) Mark Brooks	76-77=153	+9	
CUT	(New Zealand) Frank Nobilo	81-73=154	+10	
CUT	(United States) Tim Jackson (a)	79-76=155	+11	
CUT	(United States) Trip Kuehne (a)	79-76=155	+11	
CUT	(England) Lee S. James (a)	77-80=157	+13	
CUT	(United States) Mike Springer	77-80=157	+13	
CUT	(Australia) Ian Baker-Finch	79-81=160	+16	
CUT	(United States) Guy Yamamoto (a)	84-77=161	+17	
CUT	(United States) Billy Casper (c)	79-89=168	+24	
WD	(United States) Doug Ford (c)	88	+16	

==== Scorecard ====
Hole	1	2	3	4	5	6	7	8	9	10	11	12	13	14	15	16	17	18
Par	4	5	4	3	4	3	4	5	4	4	4	3	5	4	5	3	4	4
(United States) Crenshaw	−10	−11	−11	−11	−10	−11	−11	−11	−12	−12	−12	−12	−13	−13	−13	−14	−15	−14
(United States) Love III	−7	−8	−8	−8	−9	−9	−9	−10	−10	−11	−11	−11	−11	−12	−13	−12	−13	−13
(United States) Haas	−9	−9	−9	−10	−10	−10	−10	−11	−11	−11	−10	−10	−10	−11	−11	−10	−11	−11
(Australia) Norman	−7	−8	−8	−8	−8	−9	−9	−9	−9	−10	−10	−10	−11	−11	−12	−12	−11	−11
(Australia) Elkington	−9	−9	−9	−9	−8	−8	−8	−8	−7	−7	−6	−7	−8	−8	−9	−9	−9	−9
(South Africa) Frost	−8	−9	−9	−8	−8	−9	−8	−8	−9	−9	−8	−8	−9	−8	−8	−8	−9	−9
(United States) Hoch	−8	−9	−9	−8	−8	−8	−7	−8	−8	−7	−7	−6	−7	−7	−8	−7	−7	−8
(United States) Mickelson	−9	−9	−9	−10	−10	−8	−7	−8	−8	−7	−6	−6	−8	−8	−8	−8	−8	−8
(United States) Couples	−9	−9	−9	−9	−7	−8	−8	−10	−10	−10	−9	−8	−7	−7	−7	−6	−6	−6
(United States) Henninger	−10	−9	−8	−8	−8	−8	−7	−7	−7	−7	−7	−7	−7	−7	−7	−6	−6	−6

Cumulative tournament scores, relative to par

Eagle	Birdie	Bogey	Double bogey
