= 2008 Masters Tournament =

American golf tournament held in 2008

- Front cover of the 2008 Masters Journal

Tournament information
- Dates: April 10–13, 2008
- Location: Augusta, Georgia; 33.503°N 82.020°W
- Course: Augusta National Golf Club
- Organized by: Augusta National Golf Club
- Tours: PGA Tour; European Tour; Japan Golf Tour

Statistics
- Par: 72
- Length: 7,445 yards (6,808 m)
- Field: 94 players, 45 after cut
- Cut: 147 (+3)
- Prize fund: US$7,500,000
- Winner's share: $1,350,000

Champion
- (South Africa) Trevor Immelman
- 280 (−8)
- Location in the United States Location in Georgia

The 2008 Masters Tournament was the 72nd Masters Tournament, held April 10–13 at Augusta National Golf Club in Augusta, Georgia. Trevor Immelman won his first major title, three strokes ahead of runner-up Tiger Woods, a four-time champion. Immelman led or tied for the lead after every round.

== Field ==
The Masters has the smallest field of the major championships, with 94 players having earned invitations in 2008. Officially the Masters remains an invitation event but there is now a qualification process, although in theory the club could simply decline to invite a 'qualified' player. Here is a list of all players qualified to play in the 2008 Masters Tournament. Each player is classified according to the first category by which he qualified, but other categories are shown in parentheses:

1. Past Masters Champions
Fred Couples, Ben Crenshaw, Raymond Floyd, Zach Johnson (10,14,15,16,17,18), Bernhard Langer, Sandy Lyle, Phil Mickelson (4,5,14,15,16,17,18), Larry Mize, José María Olazábal, Mark O'Meara, Gary Player, Vijay Singh (4,10,14,16,17,18), Craig Stadler, Tom Watson, Mike Weir (17,18), Tiger Woods (3,4,10,11,13,14,15,16,17,18), Ian Woosnam, Fuzzy Zoeller

(Past champions not competing: Tommy Aaron, Seve Ballesteros, Jack Burke Jr., Billy Casper, Charles Coody, Nick Faldo, Doug Ford, Bob Goalby, Jack Nicklaus, Arnold Palmer. Palmer served as "honorary starter" and teed off on the first day at the first hole to kick off the tournament.)

2. Last five U.S. Open Champions
Ángel Cabrera (11,15,17,18), Michael Campbell, Jim Furyk (10,11,14,15,16,17,18), Retief Goosen (10,17,18), Geoff Ogilvy (14,15,16,17,18)

3. Last five Open Champions
Ben Curtis, Todd Hamilton, Pádraig Harrington (10,12,14,15,16,17,18)

4. Last five PGA Champions
Shaun Micheel

5. Last two of The Players Champions
Stephen Ames (17,18)

Winners of the Players Championship get three years of Masters invitations. With the Players having moved from March to May, beginning 2007, there will be only two such champions who have earned invitations to the Masters in both 2008 and 2009. In 2010 and after, once again three Players champions will have earned invitations to the Masters.

6. Top two finishers in the 2007 U.S. Amateur
Michael Thompson (a)

- (2007 U.S. Amateur and U.S. Amateur Public Links Champion Colt Knost turned professional, thereby forfeiting his invitations to the Masters, U.S. Open and The Open Championship.)

7. Winner of the 2007 The Amateur Championship
Drew Weaver (a)

8. Winner of the 2007 U.S. Amateur Public Links
See number 6

9. Winner of the 2007 U.S. Mid-Amateur
Trip Kuehne (a)

10. The top 16 finishers and ties in the 2007 Masters Tournament
Stuart Appleby (17,18), Paul Casey (17,18), Tim Clark (14,16,17,18), Luke Donald (14,17,18), Jerry Kelly (11), Ian Poulter (17,18), Justin Rose (14,16,17,18), Rory Sabbatini (14,15,16,17,18), Vaughn Taylor, David Toms (11,17)

11. Top 8 finishers and ties in the 2007 U.S. Open
Nick Dougherty (17), Niclas Fasth (17,18), Scott Verplank (14,15,16,17,18), Bubba Watson

12. Top 4 finishers and ties in the 2007 Open Championship
Ernie Els (13,14,15,16,17,18), Sergio García (14,16,17,18), Richard Green (17), Andrés Romero (15,17,18)

13. Top 4 finishers and ties in the 2007 PGA Championship
Woody Austin (14,15,16,17,18), Arron Oberholser (17,18), John Senden (18)

14. Top 30 leaders on the 2007 PGA Tour official money earnings list
Robert Allenby (16,18), Aaron Baddeley (16,17,18), Mark Calcavecchia (16,17,18), K. J. Choi (15,16,17,18), Stewart Cink (16,17,18), Steve Flesch, Charles Howell III (16,17,18), Hunter Mahan (15,16,17,18), John Rollins (16), Adam Scott (16,17,18), Heath Slocum (16), Brandt Snedeker (15,16,17,18), Steve Stricker (15,16,17,18), Boo Weekley (15,16,17,18), Brett Wetterich (16,17)

15. Winners of PGA Tour events that award a full-point allocation for the season-ending Tour Championship, between the 2007 Masters Tournament and the 2008 Masters Tournament
Brian Bateman, Jonathan Byrd (16), Daniel Chopra, J. B. Holmes, Steve Lowery, Sean O'Hair (18), D. J. Trahan, Johnson Wagner, Nick Watney

16. All players qualifying for the 2007 rendition of The Tour Championship
Camilo Villegas

17. Top 50 on the 2007 Official World Golf Rankings list
Anders Hansen, Søren Hansen (18), Trevor Immelman (18), Miguel Ángel Jiménez (18), Robert Karlsson (18), Shingo Katayama, Nick O'Hern (18), Henrik Stenson (18), Richard Sterne (18), Toru Taniguchi (18), Lee Westwood (18)

18. Top 50 on the Official World Golf Rankings list going into the tournament
Martin Kaymer, Justin Leonard, Peter Lonard

19. International invitees
Liang Wenchong, Prayad Marksaeng, Jeev Milkha Singh

== Par 3 contest ==
The annual par 3 contest was held on Wednesday, April 9, and was won by Rory Sabbatini, runner-up in the 2007 Masters Tournament. He scored -5 (22) to finish ahead of Woody Austin and Miguel Ángel Jiménez. Four players hit a hole-in-one. Paul Azinger on the second hole, Charles Coody on the third, Fred Couples on the seventh and Wayne Grady on the ninth.

== Round summaries ==
The Masters Tournament is played over four days with an eighteen-hole round being played each day, for a total of 72 holes plus practice rounds and a par-three contest on the neighboring par-three course. Everyone outside the top 44 and ties or outside ten strokes of the leader will be “cut” after 36 holes.

=== First round ===
Thursday, April 10, 2008

After an hour delay due to fog, Justin Rose, who had held the lead after the first round in the 2007 Masters, and Trevor Immelman shot rounds of 68 (−4) to lead the field. For the players in the final few groups, the last holes were played in near darkness. Ian Poulter hit a hole in one on the 16th on the way to a 70. Defending champion Zach Johnson shot a 70 and four-time champion Tiger Woods shot an even-par 72. In all, 18 players shot sub-par rounds and the scoring average was 74.18.

Place	Player	Score	To par
T1	(South Africa) Trevor Immelman	68	−4
T1	(England) Justin Rose	68	−4
T3	(United States) Brian Bateman	69	−3
T3	(United States) Brandt Snedeker	69	−3
T3	(England) Lee Westwood	69	−3
T6	(Canada) Stephen Ames	70	−2
T6	(United States) Jim Furyk	70	−2
T6	(United States) Zach Johnson	70	−2
T6	(Sweden) Robert Karlsson	70	−2
T6	(England) Ian Poulter	70	−2

=== Second round ===
Friday, April 11, 2008

Immelman shot another round of 68 (−4) to lead the field by one stroke at 136 (−8). Joint first round leader Rose shot a round of 78 (+6) to fall out of the top 10 entirely. Steve Flesch had the low round of the day at 67 and tied for third. Defending champion Zach Johnson shot a 76 for a two-round total of 146 (+2), tied for 29th. Woods shot a 71 and tied for 13th. The cut, to the top 44 players and ties, was at 147 (+3) and 45 players made the cut. In all, 28 players shot sub-par rounds for the day and the scoring average was 73.51. For the tournament, 19 players were under par and the scoring average was 73.84. Prayad Marksaeng withdrew after nine holes with a back injury. Fred Couples missed his first cut at the Masters (by one stroke), ending a streak of 23 consecutive cuts made, a record he shares with Gary Player and Tiger Woods.

Place	Player	Score	To par
1	(South Africa) Trevor Immelman	68-68=136	−8
2	(United States) Brandt Snedeker	69-68=137	−7
T3	(United States) Steve Flesch	72-67=139	−5
T3	(United States) Phil Mickelson	71-68=139	−5
T3	(England) Ian Poulter	70-69=139	−5
T6	(Canada) Stephen Ames	70-70=140	−4
T6	(England) Paul Casey	71-69=140	−4
T8	(United States) Stewart Cink	72-69=141	−3
T8	(United States) Arron Oberholser	71-70=141	−3
T8	(Canada) Mike Weir	73-68=141	−3

Amateurs: Kuehne (+6), Thompson (+10), Weaver (+12).

=== Third round ===
Saturday, April 12, 2008

Immelman shot a three-under 69 to remain in the lead at 205 (−11). Snedeker remained second and Steve Flesch third after rounds of 70 and 69 respectively. Paul Casey was the highest placed European at 209 (−7), with Woods two shots behind him. Woods, Zach Johnson, and Boo Weekley had the low rounds of the day at 68 (−4). For the round, 13 players were under par and the scoring average was 72.58. For the tournament, 18 players were under par and the scoring average was 73.60.

Place	Player	Score	To par
1	(South Africa) Trevor Immelman	68-68-69=205	−11
2	(United States) Brandt Snedeker	69-68-70=207	−9
3	(United States) Steve Flesch	72-67-69=208	−8
4	(England) Paul Casey	71-69-69=209	−7
5	(United States) Tiger Woods	72-71-68=211	−5
6	(United States) Stewart Cink	72-69-71=212	−4
T7	(South Africa) Retief Goosen	71-71-72=214	−2
T7	(Republic of Ireland) Pádraig Harrington	74-71-69=214	−2
T7	(United States) Zach Johnson	70-76-68-214	−2
T7	(Sweden) Robert Karlsson	70-73-71=214	−2
T7	(United States) Phil Mickelson	71-68-75=214	−2
T7	(United States) Sean O'Hair	72-71-71=214	−2
T7	(England) Ian Poulter	70-69-75=214	−2
T7	(Argentina) Andrés Romero	72-72-70=214	−2
T7	(United States) Boo Weekley	72-74-68=214	−2

=== Final round ===
Sunday, April 13, 2008

==== Summary ====
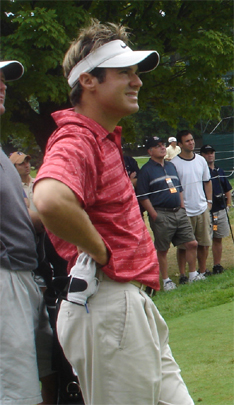
Trevor Immelman won his first Masters title

External videos
- Full final round coverage on CBS on YouTube

Miguel Ángel Jiménez had the low round of the day at 68 (−4). For the round, four players were under par and the scoring average was 74.67. For the tournament, ten players were under par and the scoring average was 73.77.

==== Final leaderboard ====
Champion
(a) = amateur
(c) = past champion

Top 10
Place	Player	Score	To par	Money (US$)
1	(South Africa) Trevor Immelman	68-68-69-75=280	−8	1,350,000
2	(United States) Tiger Woods (c)	72-71-68-72=283	−5	810,000
T3	(United States) Stewart Cink	72-69-71-72=284	−4	435,000
T3	(United States) Brandt Snedeker	69-68-70-77=284	−4	435,000
T5	(United States) Steve Flesch	72-67-69-78=286	−2	273,750
T5	(Republic of Ireland) Pádraig Harrington	74-71-69-72=286	−2	273,750
T5	(United States) Phil Mickelson (c)	71-68-75-72=286	−2	273,750
T8	(Spain) Miguel Ángel Jiménez	77-70-72-68=287	−1	217,500
T8	(Sweden) Robert Karlsson	70-73-71-73=287	−1	217,500
T8	(Argentina) Andrés Romero	72-72-70-73=287	−1	217,500

Leaderboard below the top 10
Place	Player	Score	To par	Money ($)
T11	(England) Paul Casey	71-69-69-79=288	E	172,500
T11	(United States) Nick Watney	75-70-72-71=288	E	172,500
T11	(England) Lee Westwood	69-73-73-73=288	E	172,500
T14	(Australia) Stuart Appleby	76-70-72-71=289	+1	135,000
T14	(United States) Sean O'Hair	72-71-71-75=289	+1	135,000
T14	(Fiji) Vijay Singh (c)	72-71-72-74=289	+1	135,000
T17	(South Africa) Retief Goosen	71-71-72-76=290	+2	112,500
T17	(Sweden) Henrik Stenson	74-72-72-72=290	+2	112,500
T17	(Canada) Mike Weir (c)	73-68-75-74=290	+2	112,500
T20	(United States) Brian Bateman	69-76-72-74=291	+3	84,300
T20	(United States) Zach Johnson (c)	70-76-68-77=291	+3	84,300
T20	(United States) Justin Leonard	72-74-72-73=291	+3	84,300
T20	(United States) Bubba Watson	74-71-73-73=291	+3	84,300
T20	(United States) Boo Weekley	72-74-68-77=291	+3	84,300
T25	(Canada) Stephen Ames	70-70-77-75=292	+4	54,844
T25	(Argentina) Ángel Cabrera	73-72-73-74=292	+4	54,844
T25	(United States) J. B. Holmes	73-70-73-76=292	+4	54,844
T25	(United States) Arron Oberholser	71-70-74-77=292	+4	54,844
T25	(England) Ian Poulter	70-69-75-78=292	+4	54,844
T25	(Australia) Adam Scott	75-71-70-76=292	+4	54,844
T25	(India) Jeev Milkha Singh	71-74-72-75=292	+4	54,844
T25	(South Africa) Richard Sterne	73-72-73-74=292	+4	54,844
T33	(England) Nick Dougherty	74-69-74-76=293	+5	42,375
T33	(United States) Jim Furyk	70-73-73-77=293	+5	42,375
T33	(United States) Heath Slocum	71-76-77-69=293	+5	42,375
T36	(United States) Todd Hamilton	74-73-75-73=295	+7	36,875
T36	(England) Justin Rose	68-78-73-76=295	+7	36,875
T36	(United States) Johnson Wagner	72-74-74-75=295	+7	36,875
T39	(Sweden) Niclas Fasth	75-70-76-75=296	+8	33,000
T39	(Australia) Geoff Ogilvy	75-71-76-74=296	+8	33,000
41	(South Korea) K. J. Choi	72-75-78-73=298	+10	30,750
T42	(Australia) Robert Allenby	72-74-72-81=299	+11	28,500
T42	(United States) David Toms	73-74-72-80=299	+11	28,500
44	(Wales) Ian Woosnam (c)	75-71-76-78=300	+12	26,250
45	(Scotland) Sandy Lyle (c)	72-75-78-77=302	+14	24,750
CUT	(Australia) Aaron Baddeley	75-73=148	+4	
CUT	(New Zealand) Michael Campbell	77-71=148	+4	
CUT	(United States) Fred Couples (c)	76-72=148	+4	
CUT	(England) Luke Donald	73-75=148	+4	
CUT	(South Africa) Ernie Els	74-74=148	+4	
CUT	(Spain) Sergio García	76-72=148	+4	
CUT	(United States) Charles Howell III	78-70=148	+4	
CUT	(Germany) Martin Kaymer	76-72=148	+4	
CUT	(Japan) Toru Taniguchi	76-72=148	+4	
CUT	(United States) Brett Wetterich	73-75=148	+4	
CUT	(United States) Jonathan Byrd	75-74=149	+5	
CUT	(United States) Jerry Kelly	72-77=149	+5	
CUT	(United States) Hunter Mahan	77-72=149	+5	
CUT	(Australia) Nick O'Hern	74-75=149	+5	
CUT	(United States) Mark O'Meara (c)	71-78=149	+5	
CUT	(South Africa) Rory Sabbatini	75-74=149	+5	
CUT	(United States) Craig Stadler (c)	77-72=149	+5	
CUT	(Sweden) Daniel Chopra	72-78=150	+6	
CUT	(United States) Ben Curtis	75-75=150	+6	
CUT	(United States) Trip Kuehne (a)	78-72=150	+6	
CUT	(United States) Shaun Micheel	76-74=150	+6	
CUT	(United States) John Rollins	77-73=150	+6	
CUT	(United States) Steve Stricker	73-77=150	+6	
CUT	(Colombia) Camilo Villegas	73-77=150	+6	
CUT	(United States) Tom Watson (c)	75-75=150	+6	
CUT	(Germany) Bernhard Langer (c)	74-77=151	+7	
CUT	(Spain) José María Olazábal (c)	76-75=151	+7	
CUT	(Australia) John Senden	80-71=151	+7	
CUT	(United States) Vaughn Taylor	75-76=151	+7	
CUT	(United States) Michael Thompson (a)	73-78=151	+7	
CUT	(United States) Woody Austin	79-73=152	+8	
CUT	(South Africa) Tim Clark	77-75=152	+8	
CUT	(United States) Ben Crenshaw (c)	75-77=152	+8	
CUT	(Australia) Richard Green	77-75=152	+8	
CUT	(Japan) Shingo Katayama	79-73=152	+8	
CUT	(Australia) Peter Lonard	71-81=152	+8	
CUT	(United States) Mark Calcavecchia	73-80=153	+9	
CUT	(Denmark) Søren Hansen	75-78=153	+9	
CUT	(United States) D. J. Trahan	76-77=153	+9	
CUT	(United States) Scott Verplank	77-76=153	+9	
CUT	(United States) Raymond Floyd (c)	80-74=154	+10	
CUT	(China) Liang Wenchong	76-78=154	+10	
CUT	(Denmark) Anders Hansen	80-75=155	+11	
CUT	(United States) Drew Weaver (a)	76-80=156	+12	
CUT	(United States) Steve Lowery	81-76=157	+13	
CUT	(United States) Larry Mize (c)	77-81=158	+14	
CUT	(United States) Fuzzy Zoeller (c)	81-79=160	+16	
CUT	(South Africa) Gary Player (c)	83-78=161	+17	
WD	(Thailand) Prayad Marksaeng	82	+10	

==== Scorecard ====
Hole	1	2	3	4	5	6	7	8	9	10	11	12	13	14	15	16	17	18
Par	4	5	4	3	4	3	4	5	4	4	4	3	5	4	5	3	4	4
(South Africa) Immelman	−10	−10	−10	−10	−11	−11	−11	−10	−10	−10	−10	−9	−10	−10	−10	−8	−8	−8
(United States) Woods	−5	−5	−5	−4	−4	−5	−5	−5	−5	−4	−5	−5	−5	−4	−4	−4	−4	−5
(United States) Cink	−5	−6	−6	−6	−6	−5	−5	−5	−4	−3	−2	−2	−2	−3	−3	−4	−4	−4
(United States) Snedeker	−8	−10	−9	−9	−9	−8	−7	−7	−6	−6	−5	−6	−5	−4	−5	−4	−4	−4
(United States) Flesch	−8	−8	−8	−8	−8	−8	−7	−8	−8	−8	−8	−6	−6	−5	−4	−3	−2	−2
(Republic of Ireland) Harrington	−2	−3	−4	−4	−4	−4	−4	−4	−3	−3	−2	−2	−2	−1	−2	−2	−2	−2
(United States) Mickelson	−2	−2	−2	−1	−1	−1	−1	−2	−2	−2	−2	−1	−2	−3	−3	−2	−2	−2
(England) Casey	−7	−7	−8	−6	−5	−4	−3	−2	−2	−2	−1	−1	−1	E	E	+1	E	E

Cumulative tournament scores, relative to par

Eagle	Birdie	Bogey	Double bogey

== Media coverage ==
ESPN broadcast the first two rounds of the tournament for the first time. Previously, USA televised the first two rounds beginning in 1982. ESPN also carried the par-3 contest on Wednesday afternoon, the first time the competition had been televised. BBC broadcast the whole event in the United Kingdom, with coverage being shared among BBC One, BBC Two, and BBC Red Button. In the United States, CBS Sports televised the third and fourth rounds, as they have every year beginning in 1956.
