= 2007 Masters Tournament =

- Front cover of the 2007 Masters Journal

Tournament information
- Dates: April 5–8, 2007
- Location: Augusta, Georgia; 33.503°N 82.020°W
- Course: Augusta National Golf Club
- Organized by: Augusta National Golf Club
- Tours: PGA Tour; European Tour; Japan Golf Tour

Statistics
- Par: 72
- Length: 7,445 yards (6,808 m)
- Field: 96 players, 60 after cut
- Cut: 152 (+8)
- Prize fund: US$7,418,464
- Winner's share: $1,305,000

Champion
- (United States) Zach Johnson
- 289 (+1)
- Location in the United States Location in Georgia

The 2007 Masters Tournament was the 71st Masters Tournament, held April 5–8 at Augusta National Golf Club in Augusta, Georgia. Zach Johnson won his first major championship, two strokes ahead of runners-up Retief Goosen, Rory Sabbatini, and Tiger Woods. Cool temperatures and gusty winds on the weekend resulted in high scores for the field; Johnson's 289 (+1) tied for the highest winning score ever.

Johnson did not reach a single par five hole in two during the entire tournament, yet played the par fives better than anyone in the field with 11 birdies and no bogeys.

This was the final Masters appearance for two-time champion Seve Ballesteros.

== Course ==
Hole	Name	Yards	Par	Hole	Name	Yards	Par
1	Tea Olive	455	4	10	Camellia	495	4
2	Pink Dogwood	575	5	11	White Dogwood	505	4
3	Flowering Peach	350	4	12	Golden Bell	155	3
4	Flowering Crab Apple	240	3	13	Azalea	510	5
5	Magnolia	455	4	14	Chinese Fir	440	4
6	Juniper	180	3	15	Firethorn	530	5
7	Pampas	450	4	16	Redbud	170	3
8	Yellow Jasmine	570	5	17	Nandina	440	4
9	Carolina Cherry	460	4	18	Holly	465	4
Out		3,735	36	In		3,710	36
Source:				Total		7,445	72

== Field ==
The Masters has the smallest field of the four major championships; only 97 players were invited to compete in the 2007 tournament. Officially, the Masters remains an invitational event, despite its qualification process. In theory, the club could decline to invite a 'qualified' player.

There were a record 50 'international' players in the field - the first time that the majority of the field was not American. The entire field is shown below; each player is classified according to the first category by which he qualified, but other categories are shown in parentheses.

1. Masters champions
Seve Ballesteros, Fred Couples (10), Ben Crenshaw, Raymond Floyd, Bernhard Langer, Sandy Lyle, Phil Mickelson (4,10,11,14,15,16,17), Larry Mize, José María Olazábal (10,14,15,17), Mark O'Meara, Gary Player, Vijay Singh (4,10,11,14,15,16,17), Craig Stadler, Tom Watson, Mike Weir (10,11,14,15,17), Tiger Woods (2,3,4,10,12,14,15,16,17), Fuzzy Zoeller

- Ian Woosnam withdrew before the tournament due to back problems.
- Tommy Aaron, Gay Brewer, Jack Burke Jr., Billy Casper, Charles Coody, Nick Faldo, Doug Ford, Bob Goalby, Jack Nicklaus, and Arnold Palmer did not play. After a few years hiatus, a custom was resurrected when Palmer served as the new "honorary starter" and teed off on the first day at the first hole to kick off the tournament.

2. U.S. Open champions (last five years)
Michael Campbell (15,17), Jim Furyk (11,12,14,15,17), Retief Goosen (10,14,15,17), Geoff Ogilvy (10,11,14,15,16,17)

3. The Open champions (last five years)
Ben Curtis (14), Ernie Els (12,14,15,17), Todd Hamilton

4. PGA champions (last five years)
Rich Beem, Shaun Micheel (13)

5. The Players Championship winners (last three years)
Stephen Ames (10,14,15,17), Fred Funk

Due to rescheduling of the 2007 tournament from March to May (after the Masters), only the 2005 and 2006 champions were invited.

6. U.S. Amateur champion and runner-up
John Kelly (a), Richie Ramsay (a)

7. The Amateur champion
Julien Guerrier (a)

8. U.S. Amateur Public Links champion
Casey Watabu (a)

9. U.S. Mid-Amateur champion
Dave Womack (a)

10. Top 16 players and ties from the 2006 Masters
Ángel Cabrera (15,17), Chad Campbell (14,15,17), Stewart Cink (14,15,17), Tim Clark (14,15,17), Miguel Ángel Jiménez, Billy Mayfair, Arron Oberholser (14,15,17), Rod Pampling (14,15,17), Scott Verplank (14)

11. Top eight players and ties from the 2006 U.S. Open
Kenneth Ferrie, Pádraig Harrington (15,17), Colin Montgomerie (15,17), Nick O'Hern (15,17), Jeff Sluman, Steve Stricker (14,17)

12. Top four players and ties from the 2006 Open Championship
Chris DiMarco (15,17)

13. Top four players and ties from 2006 PGA Championship
Luke Donald (14,15,17), Sergio García (15,17), Adam Scott (14,15,17)

14. Top 40 players from the 2006 PGA Tour money list
Stuart Appleby (15,17), K. J. Choi (15,17), Joe Durant (15,17), Lucas Glover (15,17), J. J. Henry, Tim Herron, Trevor Immelman (15,17), Zach Johnson, Jerry Kelly, Davis Love III (15,17), Troy Matteson, Tom Pernice Jr., Carl Pettersson (15,17), Brett Quigley, Rory Sabbatini (15), Vaughn Taylor, David Toms (15,17), Camilo Villegas, Brett Wetterich (15,17), Dean Wilson

15. Top 50 players from the final 2006 world ranking
Robert Allenby (16,17), Thomas Bjørn, Paul Casey (17), Darren Clarke, Ben Crane, Bradley Dredge, Johan Edfors, Niclas Fasth (17), David Howell (17), Robert Karlsson (17), Shingo Katayama (17), Ian Poulter (17), Jeev Milkha Singh (17), Henrik Stenson (16,17), Lee Westwood, Yang Yong-eun (17)

16. Top 10 players from the 2007 PGA Tour money list on March 26
Aaron Baddeley (17), Mark Calcavecchia, Charles Howell III (17), John Rollins (17)

17. Top 50 players from world ranking published March 26
Bart Bryant, Paul Goydos, Justin Rose

18. Special foreign invitation
Hideto Tanihara

== Round summaries ==
=== First round ===
Thursday, April 5, 2007

Billy Mayfair and Ian Poulter were the first competitors to tee off in the 2007 Masters. Both posted scores that were over par. Poulter posted a 75 (+3) and Mayfair a 76 (+4). The course proved to be playing tough, as many big names faltered on the opening day; Ernie Els finished with a 78 (+6), and defending champion Phil Mickelson looked set to get the same score, but two late birdies salvaged a poor round at 76 (+4). World number two Jim Furyk managed a 75 to keep himself in contention. Gary Player, playing in his 50th Masters, could only manage an 83 (+11); two-time winner Seve Ballesteros was at 86 (+14). Tim Clark, the 2006 runner-up, produced a wonderful shot on the 18th hole. At even par, he pulled his second shot to the left of the green and chose to putt. His ball went all the way round the green before it dropped for a birdie and 71. The leaders after the first round were Justin Rose and Brett Wetterich at 69. Rose set a new lowest putts record, needing just twenty. One of the reasons for this was his superb chipping which included a holed bunker shot on the 5th to pick up his second birdie after one at the 3rd. He then crisply rolled home another birdie at 14 to move to three-under par and made a fine save at the last having found a greenside bunker. Wetterich produced five birdies during his round. The chasing pack consisted of David Howell who eagled the 15th to post a two-under 70, and major winner David Toms. Behind them at 71, in addition to Clark, were Vaughn Taylor, Zach Johnson, Rich Beem, and J. J. Henry.

Place	Player	Score	To par
T1	(England) Justin Rose	69	−3
T1	(United States) Brett Wetterich	69	−3
T3	(England) David Howell	70	−2
T3	(United States) David Toms	70	−2
T5	(United States) Rich Beem	71	−1
T5	(South Africa) Tim Clark	71	−1
T5	(United States) J. J. Henry	71	−1
T5	(United States) Zach Johnson	71	−1
T5	(United States) Vaughn Taylor	71	−1
T10	(United States) Bart Bryant	72	E
T10	(United States) Tim Herron	72	E
T10	(United States) Davis Love III	72	E
T10	(India) Jeev Milkha Singh	72	E
T10	(Sweden) Henrik Stenson	72	E

=== Second round ===
Friday, April 6, 2007

Only three were under par at the halfway point of the tournament. Wetterich and Clark held the 36-hole lead at 142 (-2). Clark was the only man in the field to shoot under par in both rounds (71-71). Taylor held solo third place a stroke back at 143. Despite only three being under par, several golfers were within striking distance. Vijay Singh, the 2000 champion, was among a group of four at even par, and Pádraig Harrington was among a group of six at 145 (+1). The cut was at 152 (+8) and among those to miss it were notables Sergio García and Els. Fred Couples, the 1992 champion, parred the final hole to make the cut in his 23rd consecutive appearance to tie Gary Player's Masters record.

Place	Player	Score	To par
T1	(South Africa) Tim Clark	71-71=142	−2
T1	(United States) Brett Wetterich	69-73=142	−2
3	(United States) Vaughn Taylor	71-72=143	−1
T4	(United States) Zach Johnson	71-73=144	E
T4	(United States) Jerry Kelly	75-69=144	E
T4	(England) Justin Rose	69-75=144	E
T4	(Fiji) Vijay Singh	73-71=144	E
T8	(Australia) Stuart Appleby	75-70=145	+1
T8	(Wales) Bradley Dredge	75-70=145	+1
T8	(United States) Lucas Glover	74-71=145	+1
T8	(Republic of Ireland) Pádraig Harrington	77-68=145	+1
T8	(England) David Howell	70-75=145	+1
T8	(Australia) Geoff Ogilvy	75-70=145	+1

Amateurs: Kelly (+10) Ramsay (+12), Guerrier (+20), Watabu (+21), Womack (+21).

=== Third round ===
Saturday, April 7, 2007

The third round saw the worst playing conditions in many years at Augusta on an unseasonably cool day with wind gusts reaching 33 mph (53 km/h). The conditions were clearly a factor as no scores broke 70 for the round. Despite a one-over 73, Stuart Appleby took the 54-hole lead at 218 (+2). Four-time champion Tiger Woods was able to climb the leaderboard into a tie for second with an even par round. Rose shot 75 (+3) to settle into the tie for second with Woods. Retief Goosen was the only player to break par on Saturday with a two-under 70; he made the cut on the number at 152 (+8) on Friday. The final pair both shot in the 80s; Wetterich carded 83 (+11) and Clark an 80 (+8) to fall out of contention. After the third round, fourteen golfers were within four strokes of the lead.

Place	Player	Score	To par
1	(Australia) Stuart Appleby	75-70-73=218	+2
T2	(England) Justin Rose	69-75-75=219	+3
T2	(United States) Tiger Woods	73-74-72=219	+3
T4	(Republic of Ireland) Pádraig Harrington	77-68-75=220	+4
T4	(United States) Zach Johnson	71-73-76=220	+4
T4	(United States) Vaughn Taylor	71-72-77=220	+4
7	(Wales) Bradley Dredge	75-70-76=221	+5
T8	(South Africa) Tim Clark	71-71-80=222	+6
T8	(England) Luke Donald	73-74-75=222	+6
T8	(United States) Jim Furyk	75-71-76=222	+6
T8	(South Africa) Retief Goosen	76-76-70=222	+6
T8	(United States) Jerry Kelly	75-69-78=222	+6
T8	(South Africa) Rory Sabbatini	73-76-73=222	+6
T8	(United States) Phil Mickelson	76-73-73=222	+6
T8	(United States) David Toms	70-78-74=222	+6

=== Final round ===
Sunday, April 8, 2007

==== Summary ====
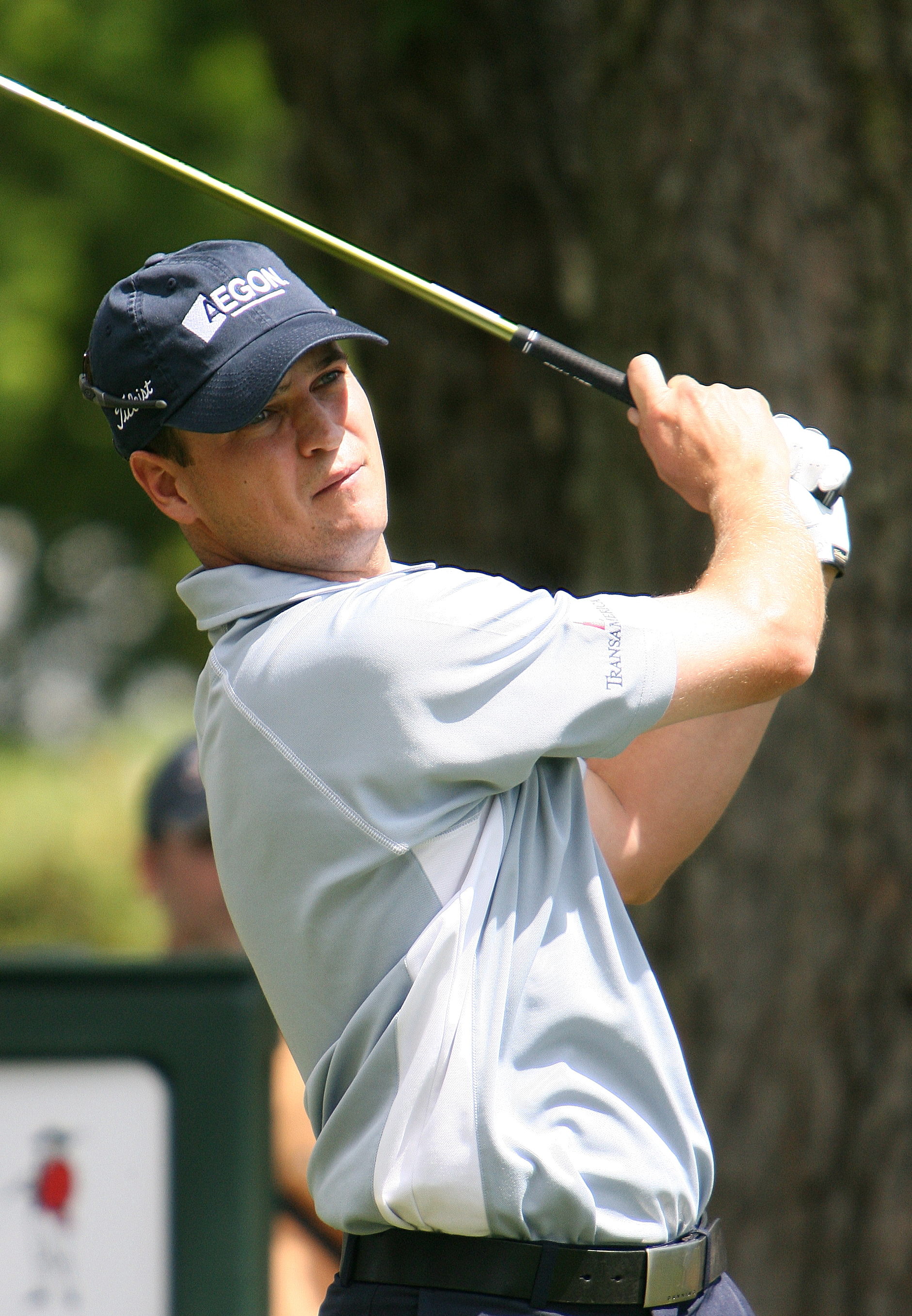
Zach Johnson won his first Masters title

External videos
- Full final round coverage on CBS on YouTube

Johnson completed a Cinderella story with a three-under 69 to claim his first major title. He captured the green jacket with three birdies over his final six holes, and became the third Masters champion to win the tournament with a score above par. The others were Sam Snead in 1954 and Jack Burke Jr. in 1956, also at 289 (+1). Johnson matched the round of the day and was able to hold off a group of three, including Woods, that finished two strokes back. Woods lost a major for the first time in which he held the lead at some point in the final round. However, since he was a stroke behind Appleby coming into the day, his 12–0 record when leading or tied at the start of the final round of a major remained intact. Appleby started off with a double bogey and added another at #12; his 75 (+3) led to a tie for seventh. South Africans Goosen and Rory Sabbatini both shot 69 to finish in a tie for second with Woods. Justin Rose was the last player to have a realistic chance of matching Johnson's clubhouse score, getting within 1 stroke at +2 with birdies at 14 and 16. However he made a double bogey on 17 to fall 3 strokes back into a tie for 5th. Defending champion Mickelson finished ten strokes back at 299 (+11), tied for 24th.

==== Final leaderboard ====
Champion
(a) = amateur
(c) = past champion

Top 10
Place	Player	Score	To par	Money (US$)
1	(United States) Zach Johnson	71-73-76-69=289	+1	1,305,000
T2	(South Africa) Retief Goosen	76-76-70-69=291	+3	541,333
T2	(South Africa) Rory Sabbatini	73-76-73-69=291	+3	541,333
T2	(United States) Tiger Woods (c)	73-74-72-72=291	+3	541,333
T5	(United States) Jerry Kelly	75-69-78-70=292	+4	275,500
T5	(England) Justin Rose	69-75-75-73=292	+4	275,500
T7	(Australia) Stuart Appleby	75-70-73-75=293	+5	233,812
T7	(Republic of Ireland) Pádraig Harrington	77-68-75-73=293	+5	233,812
9	(United States) David Toms	70-78-74-72=294	+6	210,250
T10	(England) Paul Casey	79-68-77-71=295	+7	181,250
T10	(England) Luke Donald	73-74-75-73=295	+7	181,250
T10	(United States) Vaughn Taylor	71-72-77-75=295	+7	181,250

Leaderboard below the top 10
Place	Player	Score	To par	Money ($)
T13	(South Africa) Tim Clark	71-71-80-74=296	+8	135,937
T13	(United States) Jim Furyk	75-71-76-74=296	+8	135,937
T13	(England) Ian Poulter	75-75-76-70=296	+8	135,937
T13	(Fiji) Vijay Singh (c)	73-71-79-73=296	+8	135,937
T17	(United States) Stewart Cink	77-75-75-70=297	+9	108,750
T17	(United States) Tom Pernice Jr.	75-72-79-71=297	+9	108,750
T17	(Sweden) Henrik Stenson	72-76-77-72=297	+9	108,750
T20	(United States) Mark Calcavecchia	76-71-78-73=298	+10	84,462
T20	(United States) Lucas Glover	74-71-79-74=298	+10	84,462
T20	(United States) John Rollins	77-74-76-71=298	+10	84,462
T20	(Canada) Mike Weir (c)	75-72-80-71=298	+10	84,462
T24	(Canada) Stephen Ames	76-74-77-72=299	+11	63,800
T24	(United States) Phil Mickelson (c)	76-73-73-77=299	+11	63,800
T24	(Australia) Geoff Ogilvy	75-70-81-73=299	+11	63,800
T27	(South Korea) K. J. Choi	75-75-74-76=300	+12	53,650
T27	(United States) Davis Love III	72-77-77-74=300	+12	53,650
T27	(Australia) Adam Scott	74-78-76-72=300	+12	53,650
T30	(United States) Fred Couples (c)	76-76-78-71=301	+13	43,085
T30	(United States) Charles Howell III	75-77-75-74=301	+13	43,085
T30	(Sweden) Robert Karlsson	77-73-79-72=301	+13	43,085
T30	(United States) Scott Verplank	73-77-76-75=301	+13	43,085
T30	(England) Lee Westwood	79-73-72-77=301	+13	43,085
T30	(United States) Dean Wilson	75-72-76-78=301	+13	43,085
T30	(South Korea) Yang Yong-eun	75-74-78-74=301	+13	43,085
T37	(Argentina) Ángel Cabrera	77-75-79-71=302	+14	31,900
T37	(United States) J. J. Henry	71-78-77-76=302	+14	31,900
T37	(United States) Tim Herron	72-75-83-72=302	+14	31,900
T37	(Australia) Rod Pampling	77-75-74-76=302	+14	31,900
T37	(India) Jeev Milkha Singh	72-75-76-79=302	+14	31,900
T37	(United States) Brett Wetterich	69-73-83-77=302	+14	31,900
43	(Scotland) Sandy Lyle (c)	79-73-80-71=303	+15	26,825
T44	(Wales) Bradley Dredge	75-70-76-83=304	+16	22,533
T44	(England) David Howell	70-75-82-77=304	+16	22,533
T44	(Spain) Miguel Ángel Jiménez	79-73-76-76=304	+16	22,533
T44	(Japan) Shingo Katayama	79-72-80-73=304	+16	22,533
T44	(Spain) José María Olazábal (c)	74-75-78-77=304	+16	22,533
T49	(United States) Jeff Sluman	76-75-79-75=305	+17	18,560
T49	(United States) Craig Stadler (c)	74-73-79-79=305	+17	18,560
51	(United States) Brett Quigley	76-76-79-75=306	+18	17,835
T52	(Australia) Aaron Baddeley	79-72-76-80=307	+19	17,255
T52	(Sweden) Carl Pettersson	76-76-79-76=307	+19	17,255
54	(United States) Rich Beem	71-81-75-81=308	+20	16,820
T55	(United States) Ben Crenshaw (c)	76-74-84-75=309	+21	16,530
T55	(Sweden) Niclas Fasth	77-75-77-80=309	+21	16,530
T55	(South Africa) Trevor Immelman	74-77-81-77=309	+21	16,530
58	(United States) Arron Oberholser	74-76-84-76=310	+22	16,240
59	(United States) Billy Mayfair	76-75-83-77=311	+23	16,095
60	(United States) Fuzzy Zoeller (c)	74-78-79-82=313	+25	15,950
CUT	(New Zealand) Michael Campbell	76-77=153	+9	
CUT	(United States) Chris DiMarco	75-78=153	+9	
CUT	(Scotland) Colin Montgomerie	76-77=153	+9	
CUT	(United States) Mark O'Meara (c)	77-76=153	+9	
CUT	(United States) Tom Watson (c)	75-78=153	+9	
CUT	(Denmark) Thomas Bjørn	77-77=154	+10	
CUT	(United States) Bart Bryant	72-82=154	+10	
CUT	(United States) Chad Campbell	77-77=154	+10	
CUT	(Northern Ireland) Darren Clarke	83-71=154	+10	
CUT	(South Africa) Ernie Els	78-76=154	+10	
CUT	(Spain) Sergio García	76-78=154	+10	
CUT	(United States) Todd Hamilton	74-80=154	+10	
CUT	(United States) John Kelly (a)	77-77=154	+10	
CUT	(United States) Joe Durant	80-75=155	+11	
CUT	(United States) Fred Funk	82-73=155	+11	
CUT	(Germany) Bernhard Langer (c)	78-77=155	+11	
CUT	(United States) Ben Curtis	76-80=156	+12	
CUT	(Australia) Nick O'Hern	76-80=156	+12	
CUT	(Scotland) Richie Ramsay (a)	76-80=156	+12	
CUT	(United States) Steve Stricker	77-79=156	+12	
CUT	(United States) Ben Crane	79-78=157	+13	
CUT	(Sweden) Johan Edfors	78-79=157	+13	
CUT	(United States) Raymond Floyd (c)	77-80=157	+13	
CUT	(England) Kenneth Ferrie	75-83=158	+14	
CUT	(United States) Paul Goydos	79-79=158	+14	
CUT	(United States) Troy Matteson	79-79=158	+14	
CUT	(Australia) Robert Allenby	79-80=159	+15	
CUT	(United States) Shaun Micheel	82-77=159	+15	
CUT	(South Africa) Gary Player (c)	83-77=160	+16	
CUT	(United States) Larry Mize (c)	83-78=161	+17	
CUT	(France) Julien Guerrier (a)	83-81=164	+20	
CUT	(Japan) Hideto Tanihara	85-79=164	+20	
CUT	(Colombia) Camilo Villegas	80-85=165	+21	
CUT	(United States) Casey Watabu (a)	87-78=165	+21	
CUT	(United States) Dave Womack (a)	84-81=165	+21	
CUT	(Spain) Seve Ballesteros (c)	86-80=166	+22	

==== Scorecard ====
Hole	1	2	3	4	5	6	7	8	9	10	11	12	13	14	15	16	17	18
Par	4	5	4	3	4	3	4	5	4	4	4	3	5	4	5	3	4	4
(United States) Johnson	+5	+4	+3	+3	+4	+4	+4	+3	+3	+3	+3	+3	+2	+1	+1	E	+1	+1
(South Africa) Goosen	+6	+5	+4	+4	+4	+4	+3	+2	+2	+2	+2	+3	+3	+3	+3	+3	+3	+3
(South Africa) Sabbatini	+6	+5	+4	+4	+4	+4	+4	+2	+3	+3	+3	+3	+2	+3	+3	+4	+4	+3
(United States) Woods	+4	+3	+3	+3	+3	+4	+4	+4	+4	+5	+5	+5	+3	+3	+3	+3	+3	+3
(United States) Kelly	+7	+6	+6	+6	+6	+6	+6	+6	+6	+7	+7	+7	+5	+5	+4	+4	+4	+4
(England) Rose	+5	+4	+6	+7	+7	+7	+7	+6	+5	+5	+4	+4	+4	+3	+3	+2	+4	+4
(Australia) Appleby	+4	+4	+4	+4	+4	+3	+3	+3	+3	+3	+3	+5	+5	+5	+5	+5	+5	+5
(Republic of Ireland) Harrington	+5	+5	+5	+6	+6	+6	+6	+6	+6	+6	+7	+6	+4	+4	+5	+6	+5	+5

Cumulative tournament scores, relative to par

Eagle	Birdie	Bogey	Double bogey

== Par 3 Contest ==
Mark O'Meara, 1998 champion, won the annual Par 3 contest, held on Wednesday, April 4.
