= Guy Yamamoto =

American golfer (born 1961)

Guy Yamamoto (born 1961) is an American amateur golfer from Hawaii. Yamamoto won the U.S. Amateur Public Links (APL) in 1994. Yamamoto was the fourth person from Hawaii to win the championship, and the only one from Kauai to win the APL until Casey Watabu won the championship in 2006. Coincidentally, Yamamoto and Watabu attended the same high school, although at different times.

Yamamoto also competed in the 1995 Masters Tournament in Augusta, Georgia.

== Biography ==
=== Early life and education ===
Yamamoto was born and raised on the Hawaiian island of Kauai. He attended Wilcox Elementary School and Kauai High and Intermediate School in Lihue. While attending Kauai High, he was a member of the school's golf team as well as being active in extracurricular clubs. Yamamoto honed his golf game at Wailua Golf Course under the tutelage of the Toyo Shirai. Yamamoto graduated from Kauai High School in 1979.

=== Tournament golf ===
Yamamoto's biggest win happened in 1994 when he defeated over 5,300 golfers to become the U.S. Amateur Public Links champion. The official account of Yamamoto's big win is best described by the United States Golf Association, as described below:

"It took Guy Yamamoto 37 holes to emerge as champion of the 1994 U.S. Amateur Public Links. A two-putt par from 20 feet proved one better than opponent Chris Riley's bogey; Yamamoto, of Waipahu, Hawaii, defeated the UNLV sophomore, and captured his first United States Golf Association championship.

After 11 previous attempts to qualify for the championship, Yamamoto, age 32, was ecstatic about his victory. "This is something I'll always remember," he said. "It shows that if you dream hard enough, sometimes your dreams can come true."

The last four holes of the regulation 36 proved exciting. On the 15th, Yamamoto, who'd been three holes down after the morning round, worked back to all square by holing a 45-foot putt from off the green for birdie. On the 16th, Riley answered back with a birdie of his own to take a 1-up advantage.

Then, on the 17th, a par five of 532 yards, Yamamoto drove long and straight, then lashed a 5-iron 196 yards to within three feet of the cup, and holed the putt for eagle 3.

The two halved the 18th in pars. Then, on the first extra hole, after both players had driven in the rough, Yamamoto's 8-iron wound up 20 feet from the hole, while Riley's approach just missed the green to the left.

Riley was unable to get up and down for par; Yamamoto rolled in his 20-inch par putt, and that was that."

Because of Yamamoto's championship win, he was invited to play in the Masters Tournament in 1995. Yamamoto competed in the tournament and shot an 84 in the first round and a 77 in the second round. He missed the cut with a score of 161.

=== Professional life ===
Yamamoto is now the general manager at the Mililani Golf Club in Mililani, Hawaii.
