= John Kelly (golfer) =

American golfer (born 1984)

John Kelly (born November 1, 1984) is an amateur golfer who played for the University of Missouri and was runner-up in the 2006 U.S. Amateur.

== Career ==
Kelly was born in St. Louis, Missouri. He graduated from Christian Brothers College High School. Shortly after he graduated high school, in 2003, Kelly won the AJGA Lockton Kansas City Junior. That year Kelly was an American Junior Golf Association (AJGA) All American-Honorable Mention. The following year he won the Metropolitan Amateur and Phil Cotton Invitational. In 2005, he earned another championship, winning the Missouri Intercollegiate.

In 2006, Kelly finished runner-up at the U.S. Amateur. During his run to the U.S. Amateur final, Kelly beat several nationally ranked players, including Trip Kuehne (who was runner-up to Tiger Woods in the 1994 U.S. Amateur). He lost the final match to Scotland's Richie Ramsay on the 34th hole by a score of 4 and 2. By making the finals, he qualified for the 2007 U.S. Open and gained an invitation to the 2007 Masters Tournament where he was the low amateur.

== Awards and honors ==
- In 2003, Kelly was an American Junior Golf Association (AJGA) All American-Honorable Mention.
- In 2006, Kelly was honored as the Missouri Golf Association Player of the Year.
- In 2006 and 2007, the Cleveland Golf and the Golf Coaches Association of America named him an All-America Scholar.

== Amateur wins ==
- 2003 AJGA Lockton Kansas City Junior
- 2004 Phil Cotton Invitational, Metropolitan Amateur
- 2005 Missouri Intercollegiate
- 2006 Ozark Invitational, Metropolitan Match Play, Missouri Stroke Play Championship
- 2007 Ozark Invitational

== Results in major championships ==
Tournament	2007
Masters Tournament	CUT
U.S. Open	CUT
The Open Championship	
PGA Championship	

Did not play

CUT = missed the half-way cut
