= Rory Sabbatini =

South African-Slovak professional golfer (born 1976)

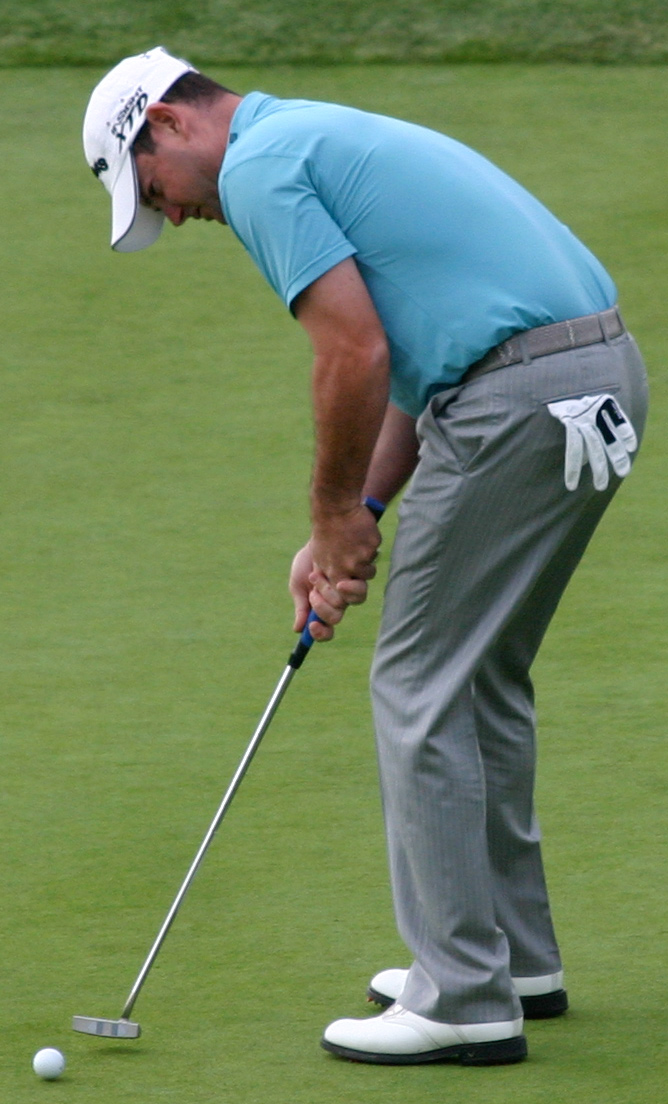
- Sabbatini in 2008

Personal information
- Full name: Rory Mario Trevor Sabbatini
- Nicknames: The Boy from Bratislava, The Silver Slovak
- Nationality: South Africa; England (1998); Slovakia (since 2019)
- Born: 2 April 1976 (age 50) Durban, South Africa
- Height: 5 ft 10 in (1.78 m)
- Weight: 165 lb (75 kg; 11.8 st)

Career
- Sport: Golf
- College: University of Arizona
- Turned professional: 1998
- Current tour: PGA Tour Champions
- Former tour: PGA Tour
- Professional wins: 11
- Highest ranking: 8 (23 September 2007)

Number of wins by tour
- PGA Tour: 6
- PGA Tour Champions: 1
- Other: 4

Best results in major championships
- Masters Tournament: T2: 2007
- PGA Championship: T39: 2008
- U.S. Open: T30: 2011
- The Open Championship: T16: 2019
Medal record
Representing Slovakia
Olympic Games
Silver medal – second place	2020 Tokyo	Individual

Rory Mario Trevor Sabbatini (born 2 April 1976) is a South African-Slovak professional golfer. Sabbatini won six times on the PGA Tour between 2000 and 2011 and was runner-up in the 2007 Masters. He spent 21 weeks in the world top-10 in late 2007 and early 2008, with a high of 8th. Sabbatini won the silver medal at the 2020 Summer Olympics, representing Slovakia.

== Early life ==
Sabbatini was born in Durban, South Africa, and has Italian, Scottish and Irish ancestry. He started playing golf at age 4, but concentrated on it from age 12. He was recruited by the University of Arizona, turned professional in 1998 and joined the PGA Tour in 1999. He was the youngest member of the tour that year.

== Professional career ==
During the first decade of the 2000s, Sabbatini had five PGA Tour wins; he finished 2006 placed 12th on the money list. In September 2007, he reached the top 10 of the world rankings for the first time. He spent 21 weeks in the top-10 between September 2007 and March 2008, with a high of 8th.

Sabbatini tied for second at the 2007 Masters Tournament and the 2007 WGC-Bridgestone Invitational. He won the Par 3 Contest at the 2008 Masters Tournament.

Sabbatini has represented South Africa in the World Cup six times and won the event with Trevor Immelman in 2003.

In his first Presidents Cup appearance in 2007, Sabbatini had a 0–3–1 record, as the International team was defeated by the United States team.

In May 2009, Sabbatini captured his fifth PGA Tour title by winning the HP Byron Nelson Championship by two strokes over Brian Davis. He broke the tournament record for scoring with a score of 269 (−19), beating the previous record of 270 (−18).

In March 2011, Sabbatini won his sixth PGA Tour Title at The Honda Classic with a one stroke victory over South Korea's Yang Yong-eun. Sabbatini entered the final round with a five stroke lead over the rest of the field, helped by a course record-equalling 64 on day two. He started his final round in solid fashion with an early birdie at the 3rd hole, however as the round progressed he made bogeys at the 9th and 14th, meaning that Yang was able to cut that lead to just one, with a spectacular tee shot on the par-three 15th that landed 18 inches past the pin. On the next hole though, Sabbatini holed a clutch birdie putt to tighten his grip on the title and played out the 17th and 18th in even-par to hold on for a one stroke victory. This win also secured him a place at the 2011 Masters Tournament.

On 15 December 2019, Sabbatini won the QBE Shootout with partner Kevin Tway.

Sabbatini qualified to represent Slovakia at the 2020 Summer Olympics and won the silver medal.

== Controversy ==
In the final round of the 2005 Booz Allen Classic, apparently frustrated by the slow pace of play by his partner, Ben Crane, Sabbatini finished the 17th hole and walked over to the next tee, leaving Crane behind to complete the hole by himself. He received heavy criticism, and some sympathy, and later apologised for the incident.

Sabbatini also made waves following the Wachovia Championship in May 2007 when, after leading the field by one stroke after day three and then giving up five strokes to Tiger Woods to lose the tournament on Sunday, he proclaimed that Woods was "more beatable than ever." In the final round of the 2007 WGC-Bridgestone Invitational, he had a fan removed who heckled him with questions about Tiger Woods. Then, in December of the same year, more controversy was stirred when he withdrew from the Target World Challenge, an off-season event hosted by Tiger Woods, becoming the only player in history to withdraw from that event.

In 2011, Sabbatini created more controversy when at the Northern Trust Open, after hitting his ball in the rough, a volunteer helped to locate the ball, but Sabbatini, thinking that the volunteer had moved his ball, yelled at him. He later apologised to avoid being penalised. Later in 2011, at the Zurich Classic of New Orleans, Sabbatini got into a heated, profanity-laced argument with playing partner Sean O'Hair for undisclosed reasons. His penalty was also undisclosed because of the PGA Tour's policy.

== Citizenship change ==
In December 2018, Sabbatini became a citizen of Slovakia, the home country of his wife and stepson. Sabbatini's wife's cousin is the vice president of the Slovak Golf Association. Initially, there was speculation that the move was made in order for Sabbatini to qualify for the 2020 Olympics, but he said it was to help grow the game in that country. The Olympics use the Official World Golf Ranking (OWGR) for qualification and the 201st-ranked Sabbatini would not have qualified for South Africa with ten others ahead of him. Sabbatini went on to capture a silver medal, shooting an Olympic record 61 during his final round. Sabbatini also has a UK passport and US citizenship.

== Personal life ==
As of 2020, he was married to Martina Stofanikova.

== Awards and honors ==
In 1998, Sabbatini was awarded Pac-10 Player of the Year.

== Professional wins (11) ==
=== PGA Tour wins (6) ===
No.	Date	Tournament	Winning score	Margin of victory	Runner(s)-up
1	3 Sep 2000	Air Canada Championship	−16 (68-68-67-65=268)	1 stroke	(New Zealand) Grant Waite
2	9 Jun 2003	FBR Capital Open	−14 (68-66-68-68=270)	4 strokes	(United States) Joe Durant, (United States) Fred Funk, (United States) Duffy Waldorf
3	19 Feb 2006	Nissan Open	−13 (67-65-67-72=271)	1 stroke	(Australia) Adam Scott
4	27 May 2007	Crowne Plaza Invitational at Colonial	−14 (70-67-62-67=266)	Playoff	(United States) Jim Furyk, (Germany) Bernhard Langer
5	24 May 2009	HP Byron Nelson Championship	−19 (68-64-65-64=261)	2 strokes	(England) Brian Davis
6	6 Mar 2011	The Honda Classic	−9 (71-64-66-70=271)	1 stroke	(South Korea) Yang Yong-eun

PGA Tour playoff record (1–1)

No.	Year	Tournament	Opponents	Result
1	2004	Buick Classic	(Spain) Sergio García, (Republic of Ireland) Pádraig Harrington	García won with birdie on third extra hole Harrington eliminated by par on second hole
2	2007	Crowne Plaza Invitational at Colonial	(United States) Jim Furyk, (Germany) Bernhard Langer	Won with birdie on first extra hole

=== Other wins (4) ===
Legend
World Golf Championships (1)
Other wins (2)

No.	Date	Tournament	Winning score	Margin of victory	Runner(s)-up
1	16 Nov 2003	WGC-World Cup (with (South Africa) Trevor Immelman)	−13 (70-69-63-73=275)	4 strokes	England − Paul Casey and Justin Rose
2	10 Sep 2019	Penati Slovak Open	−7 (69-70=139)	Playoff	(Czech Republic) Ondřej Lieser
3	15 Dec 2019	QBE Shootout (with (United States) Kevin Tway)	−31 (58-67-60=185)	2 strokes	(United States) Jason Kokrak and (United States) J. T. Poston
4	9 Sep 2026	Penati Slovak Open (2)	−16 (70-65-68=203)	9 strokes	(Czech Republic) Ondřej Lieser

=== PGA Tour Champions wins (1) ===
Legend
Charles Schwab Cup playoff events (1)
Other PGA Tour Champions (0)

No.	Date	Tournament	Winning score	Margin of victory	Runner-up
1	25 Oct 2026	Stifel Charity Classic	−14 (68-69-62=199)	1 stroke	(Northern Ireland) Darren Clarke

== Results in major championships ==
Results not in chronological order in 2020.

Tournament	2000	2001	2002	2003	2004	2005	2006	2007	2008	2009
Masters Tournament		CUT	CUT			CUT	T36	T2	CUT	T20
U.S. Open	CUT			CUT	CUT	T71	CUT	T51	T58	CUT
The Open Championship		T54		T53	T66	CUT	T26	CUT	CUT	CUT
PGA Championship	77	CUT	CUT	68	CUT	T74	CUT	CUT	T39	T67

Tournament	2010	2011	2012	2013	2014	2015	2016	2017	2018
Masters Tournament	CUT	CUT	CUT						
U.S. Open	CUT	T30		CUT					
The Open Championship		T54							
PGA Championship	CUT	T74	CUT		CUT	CUT			

Tournament	2019	2020
Masters Tournament		
PGA Championship		T66
U.S. Open	T43	T59
The Open Championship	T16	NT

Top 10
Did not play

CUT = missed the half-way cut
"T" = tied
NT = No tournament due to COVID-19 pandemic

=== Summary ===
Tournament	Wins	2nd	3rd	Top-5	Top-10	Top-25	Events	Cuts made
Masters Tournament	0	1	0	1	1	2	10	3
PGA Championship	0	0	0	0	0	0	16	7
U.S. Open	0	0	0	0	0	0	13	6
The Open Championship	0	0	0	0	0	1	10	6
Totals	0	1	0	1	1	3	49	22

- Most consecutive cuts made – 4 (2019 U.S. Open – 2020 U.S. Open, current)
- Longest streak of top-10s – 1

== Results in The Players Championship ==
Tournament	2000	2001	2002	2003	2004	2005	2006	2007	2008	2009
The Players Championship	CUT	CUT	CUT	CUT	T42	CUT	CUT	T44	T27	CUT

Tournament	2010	2011	2012	2013	2014	2015	2016	2017	2018	2019
The Players Championship	T39	T26	CUT	71	T38	T6			T30	T35

Tournament	2020	2021
The Players Championship	C	T67

Top 10
Did not play

CUT = missed the halfway cut
"T" indicates a tie for a place
C = Cancelled after the first round due to the COVID-19 pandemic

== Results in World Golf Championships ==
Tournament	2002	2003	2004	2005	2006	2007	2008	2009	2010	2011
Match Play	R64			R16	R64	R32	R64	R64	R64	
Championship			T21		T41	T35	T70	T53		T28
Invitational		T51	T2	T28	T36	T2	T27	T45		T48
Champions								T45		T29

Top 10
Did not play

QF, R16, R32, R64 = Round in which player lost in match play
"T" = Tied
Note that the HSBC Champions did not become a WGC event until 2009.

== Team appearances ==
Amateur

- Palmer Cup (representing Great Britain & Ireland): 1998 (tie)

Professional

- World Cup (representing South Africa): 2002, 2003 (winners), 2004, 2006, 2008, 2009
- Presidents Cup (representing the International Team): 2007

== See also ==
- 1998 PGA Tour Qualifying School graduates
- 2016 Web.com Tour Finals graduates
