= Colt Knost =

American professional golfer (born 1985)

Personal information
- Nationality: United States
- Born: June 26, 1985 (age 41) Garrettsville, Ohio, U.S.
- Height: 5 ft 9 in (1.75 m)
- Weight: 215 lb (98 kg; 15.4 st)

Career
- Sport: Golf
- College: Southern Methodist University
- Turned professional: 2007
- Former tours: Web.com Tour; PGA Tour
- Professional wins: 2
- Highest ranking: 92 (July 3, 2016)

Number of wins by tour
- Korn Ferry Tour: 2

Best results in major championships
- Masters Tournament: DNP
- PGA Championship: T70: 2016
- U.S. Open: CUT: 2012
- The Open Championship: CUT: 2016

Achievements and awards
- Mark H. McCormack Medal: 2007

Colt Knost (born June 26, 1985) is an American former professional golfer who played on the PGA Tour. Beginning in January 2022, he became a regular analyst and on-course commentator for PGA Tour events televised by CBS Sports.

== Amateur career ==
Knost was born in Garrettsville, Ohio and grew up in Pilot Point, Texas. He was the Class 3A State Champion his senior year of 2003. He graduated from Southern Methodist University in 2007. While at SMU, he earned all-conference and all-region honors. He was also named the 2004 Western Athletic Conference Freshman of the Year. Knost won three United States Golf Association events in 2007, joining Bobby Jones (1930) and Jay Sigel (1983) as the only players to do so. In July he won the U.S. Amateur Public Links over Cody Paladino, 6 & 4. In August he won the U.S. Amateur, 2 & 1 over Michael Thompson. In September he represented the United States at the 2007 Walker Cup. The United States won 12½ to 11½ and Knost posted a record of 2-0-2 (W-L-H). He was the number one ranked golfer in the World Amateur Golf Ranking for five weeks in 2007 before turning professional. Knost was awarded the inaugural Mark H. McCormack Medal by The Royal and Ancient Golf Club of St Andrews in 2007.

== Professional career ==
Shortly after winning the 2007 U.S. Amateur, he turned professional, forfeiting his invitations to The Masters, the U.S. Open, and the Open Championship. Knost played in three events on the PGA Tour as a professional in 2007, making two of three cuts with his best finish coming at the Frys.com Open, where he finished T-38. Knost went to qualifying school to try to earn his PGA Tour card for 2008 but his finish of T-85 was not good enough to earn him his card.

Knost played on the Nationwide Tour in 2008 and won the Fort Smith Classic and the Price Cutter Charity Championship. He finished 6th on the money list with $329,509 and earned his 2009 PGA Tour card. On the PGA Tour, Knost made only 11 of 24 cuts, with his best finish coming at the Bob Hope Classic where he finished T-25. He finished 193rd on the money list and returned to the Nationwide Tour in 2010.

By finishing 2010 at 15th on the Nationwide Tour money list, he earned his PGA Tour card again for 2011.

He finished only 156th in the FedEx Cup list for 2011, but was successful at the 2011 qualifying school (by the narrowest margin of one stroke). In 2012 he finished 120th to retain his PGA Tour card, but in 2013 he finished 184th and dropped back to the Web.com Tour.

In the 2014 Web.com Tour Finals he finished second (excluding the regular-season Top 25) and returned to the PGA Tour for 2015. He finished that season 91st on the FedEx Cup rankings to retain his Tour card.

After missing the cut in the 2020 Waste Management Phoenix Open, Knost announced his retirement from professional golf.

=== Broadcasting career ===
In January 2022, CBS Sports announced that Knost would work as a regular on-course commentator for PGA Tour events. During the 2022 Masters Tournament, Knost was an analyst and commentator covering featured groups on the CBS Sports television broadcast.

Knost also hosts a podcast with Golf.com called "GOLFs Subpar" along with former professional golfer Drew Stoltz.

== Amateur wins ==
- 2005 Dixie Amateur
- 2007 U.S. Amateur Public Links, U.S. Amateur
- 2008 Georgia Cup

== Professional wins (2) ==
=== Nationwide Tour wins (2) ===
No.	Date	Tournament	Winning score	Margin of victory	Runner-up
1	May 11, 2008	Fort Smith Classic	−12 (68-65-70-65=268)	1 stroke	(United States) Darron Stiles
2	Jul 20, 2008	Price Cutter Charity Championship	−26 (64-67-69-62=262)	4 strokes	(United States) Webb Simpson

Nationwide Tour playoff record (0–1)

No.	Year	Tournament	Opponent	Result
1	2010	Nationwide Tour Championship	(United States) Brendan Steele	Lost to birdie on fourth extra hole

== Results in major championships ==
Tournament	2012	2013	2014	2015	2016
U.S. Open	CUT				
The Open Championship					CUT
PGA Championship					T70

Note: Knost never played in the Masters Tournament.

Did not play

CUT = missed the half-way cut
"T" = tied

== Results in The Players Championship ==
Tournament	2012	2013	2014	2015	2016
The Players Championship	CUT	WD			T3

Top 10
Did not play

CUT = missed the halfway cut
WD = withdrew
"T" indicates a tie for a place

== U.S. national team appearances ==
- Walker Cup: 2007 (winners)

== See also ==
- 2008 Nationwide Tour graduates
- 2010 Nationwide Tour graduates
- 2011 PGA Tour Qualifying School graduates
- 2014 Web.com Tour Finals graduates
