= U.S. Amateur Public Links =

Golf tournament, 1922–2014

The U.S. Amateur Public Links Championship, often referred to as the Public Links or the Publinx, was a men's amateur golf tournament, one of 10 individual amateur championships organized by the United States Golf Association. The USGA typically called the event the U.S. Amateur Public Links, which it has registered as a service mark. The tournament was devised as a championship for golfers who played on public courses, as members of private clubs were barred from entry. In February 2013, the USGA announced that the event would be discontinued after its 2014 edition, and would be replaced by a new men's amateur four-ball championship.

== History ==
The first Public Links was held in 1922 at the Ottawa Park Course in Toledo, Ohio. The event grew over time, from 140 entries in 1922 to over 6,000 in 1998.

Pub Links Tournament at East Potomac Park Golf Course, June 29, 2023

The Publinx was created to provide an outlet for national competition for public-course golfers because at that time, entry to the U.S. Amateur was restricted to members of clubs that were affiliated with the USGA or (presumably) other national governing bodies. However, in 1979, entry to the U.S. Amateur was opened to all amateurs, whether or not they were club members.

The equivalent event for women was the U.S. Women's Amateur Public Links, established in 1977 and also discontinued after 2014 and replaced by a women's four-ball tournament.

The 2005 edition, held in Lebanon, Ohio, drew an unusually large amount of media attention due to Michelle Wie's presence. She had stated on several occasions that she wished to one day play in the Masters, and this event was generally considered to be her best chance to qualify. Wie advanced to the match play rounds, losing in the quarterfinals to Clay Ogden, who went on to win the tournament.

Trevor Immelman became the first winner of the Public Links to win a Major Championship with his victory at the 2008 Masters Tournament. His playing partner in the final round, Brandt Snedeker, was also a past Public Links winner.

When the USGA announced the demise of the Publinx, it specifically stated that "the APL [Amateur Public Links] and WAPL [Women's Amateur Public Links] championships no longer serve their original mission because of the widespread accessibility public-course golfers today enjoy in USGA championships."

== Eligibility requirements ==
Eligibility was similar to that for the U.S. Amateur. Golfers must follow the USGA's guidelines for amateur status, which, in general, exclude anyone who has ever played or taught golf for money. The Public Links, like the U.S. Amateur, had no age limit. However, there were two key differences in the eligibility criteria for the Public Links:

- Entries were accepted from golfers with a USGA men's handicap of 4.4 or lower, as opposed to 2.4 for the U.S. Amateur.
- Entries were not accepted from players who have playing privileges at golf clubs not open to the general public, and such golfers were not allowed to compete if they received such privileges between their entry and the end of the main tournament.
  - Exceptions to above: The USGA did consider some players with privileges at non-public facilities to be "bona fide public course players," specifically those whose privileges were solely due to any of the following:
    - Their enrollment in a specific educational institution.
    - Their status as active or retired members of the military.
    - Their current or former employment by an entity other than a golf club.

The Public Links was open to men and women, although very few women ever entered. In 2005, 15-year-old Michelle Wie became the first woman to advance to the match-play portion of the tournament. She was also the first woman to ever qualify for any USGA championship typically played by men.

Entrants qualified to play in the U.S. Amateur Public Links by playing one of many qualifying tournaments held at sites around the United States with players completing 36 holes of stroke play in one day. The 64 qualifiers played in the tournament proper which began with three rounds of stroke play to narrow the field to 16 players who then competed in a single-elimination match play tournament. Each match was 18 holes except the championship match which was 36 holes; before 2001, the final was an 18-hole match.

The winner of the event earned an invitation to the following year's Masters Tournament, if he/she was still an amateur at the time of the Masters.

== Winners ==
Dick Walsh of N.Y., winner of 1923 tournament

- 2014 Byron Meth
- 2013 Jordan Niebrugge
- 2012 T. J. Vogel
- 2011 Corbin Mills
- 2010 Lion Kim
- 2009 Brad Benjamin
- 2008 Jack Newman
- 2007 Colt Knost
- 2006 Casey Watabu
- 2005 Clay Ogden
- 2004 Ryan Moore
- 2003 Brandt Snedeker
- 2002 Ryan Moore
- 2001 Chez Reavie
- 2000 D. J. Trahan
- 1999 Hunter Haas
- 1998 Trevor Immelman
- 1997 Tim Clark
- 1996 Tim Hogarth
- 1995 Chris Wollmann
- 1994 Guy Yamamoto
- 1993 David Berganio Jr.
- 1992 Warren Schutte
- 1991 David Berganio Jr.
- 1990 Michael Combs
- 1989 Tim Hobby
- 1988 Ralph Howe III
- 1987 Kevin Johnson
- 1986 Billy Mayfair
- 1985 Jim Sorenson
- 1984 Bill Malley
- 1983 Billy Tuten
- 1982 Billy Tuten
- 1981 Jodie Mudd
- 1980 Jodie Mudd
- 1979 Dennis Walsh
- 1978 Dean Prince
- 1977 Jerry Vidovic
- 1976 Eddie Mudd
- 1975 Randy Barenaba
- 1974 Charles Barenaba, Jr.
- 1973 Stan Stopa
- 1972 Bob Allard
- 1971 Fred Haney
- 1970 Robert Risch
- 1969 John M. Jackson, Jr.
- 1968 Gene Towry
- 1967 Verne Callison
- 1966 Monty Kaser
- 1965 Arne Dokka
- 1964 William McDonald
- 1963 Robert Lunn
- 1962 R. H. Sikes
- 1961 R. H. Sikes
- 1960 Verne Callison
- 1959 Bill Wright
- 1958 Dan Sikes
- 1957 Don Essig III
- 1956 James H. Buxbaum
- 1955 Sam D. Kocsis
- 1954 Gene Andrews
- 1953 Ted Richards Jr.
- 1952 Omer L. Bogan
- 1951 Dave Stanley
- 1950 Stanley Bielat
- 1949 Kenneth J. Towns
- 1948 Michael R. Ferentz
- 1947 Wilfred Crossley
- 1946 Smiley Quick
- 1942–45 No tournament
- 1941 William M. Welch, Jr.
- 1940 Robert C. Clark
- 1939 Andrew Szwedko
- 1938 Al Leach
- 1937 Bruce McCormick
- 1936 Pat Abbott
- 1935 Frank Strafaci
- 1934 David A. Mitchell
- 1933 Charles Ferrera
- 1932 R. L. Miller
- 1931 Charles Ferrera
- 1930 Robert E. Wingate
- 1929 Carl F. Kauffmann
- 1928 Carl F. Kauffmann
- 1927 Carl F. Kauffmann
- 1926 Lester Bolstad
- 1925 Raymond J. McAuliffe
- 1924 Joseph Coble
- 1923 Richard J. Walsh
- 1922 Edmund R. Held

== Multiple winners ==
- 3 wins: Carl F. Kauffmann
- 2 wins: David Berganio Jr., Verne Callison, Charles Ferrera, Ryan Moore, Jodie Mudd, R. H. Sikes, Billy Tuten
