= Trip Kuehne =

American amateur golfer (born 1972)

Tripp Kuehne
Personal information
- Full name: Ernest W. Kuehne III
- Nickname: Trip
- Nationality: United States
- Born: June 20, 1972 (age 54) Dallas, Texas, U.S.

Career
- Sport: Golf
- College: Oklahoma State University
- Status: Amateur

Best results in major championships
- Masters Tournament: CUT : 1995, 2008
- PGA Championship: DNP
- U.S. Open: T57 : 2003
- The Open Championship: DNP

Ernest W. "Trip" Kuehne III (born June 20, 1972) is an American amateur golfer. He is most remembered for his defeat at the hands of Tiger Woods in the 1994 U.S. Amateur, and his subsequent refusal to turn professional in favor of a successful amateur career.

== Early life ==
Kuehne was born in Dallas, Texas. As a pupil at Highland Park High School in Dallas, he was coached by Hank Haney, who later gained renown as Tiger Woods' swing coach after Woods and Butch Harmon split in 2002. Under Haney's tutelage he won back-to-back Texas high school golf championships, an achievement shared with Justin Leonard, Ben Crenshaw and Tom Kite.

He enrolled at Arizona State University, where he was the roommate of Phil Mickelson. He then transferred to Oklahoma State University, where he was All-American from 1994 to 1996 and won the 1995 Ben Hogan Award. But following his defeat at the 1994 U.S. Amateur, Kuehne found he was unwilling to make the sacrifices demanded in a professional golfer's life, and concentrated instead on a career in finance after graduating with an MBA in 1997.

== Golf career ==
I want people to realize that you don't have to turn professional if you're an All-American. There are other things out there. You can get a good-paying job, you can enjoy the game of golf and play because you love the game of golf.

— Trip Kuehne, after winning the U.S. Mid-Amateur in October 2007.

In 1994, Kuehne reached the final of the U.S. Amateur at the TPC at Sawgrass, where his opponent was a heavily hyped eighteen-year-old Tiger Woods. After shooting 66 in the morning round, Kuehne had a six-hole advantage, and was five up with twelve holes remaining. Woods then staged the greatest turnaround in the tournament's 94-year history, winning five of the next ten holes before sinking a fifteen-foot putt on the seventeenth to win the event in what was described as "one of golf's great performances". The defeat caused Kuehne to question his own commitment to the sport and whether he really was good enough to compete. He has since said that he views the match a "blessing in disguise," although he says that he still will not watch footage of the match.

Kuehne played in three Walker Cup teams for the United States, in 1995, 2003, and 2007. He also played in four U.S. Opens, where he was the lowest scoring amateur in 2003 at Olympia Fields Country Club. Thirteen years after his Masters Tournament debut as runner-up to Woods, he returned to the Augusta National Golf Club in 2008, this time by beating Dan Whitaker, 9 and 7, at the 2007 U.S. Mid-Amateur at Bandon Dunes Golf Resort in Oregon to qualify. The fulfillment of his ambition to "take my boy to the Masters", along with his other 2007 successes—he was on the winning Walker Cup team for the first time, and helped Texas retain the USGA state team title—led him to make Augusta the scene of his final competitive tournament before retirement.

At age 49, Kuehne entered a few amateur tournaments with an intent to participate in qualifying for major tournaments as he will have reached eligibility for the senior amateur and professional championships in 2022 when he turns 50. In 2023, he qualified for the U.S. Senior Open.

== Personal life ==
Kuehne is the eldest child of Ernest W. "Ernie" Kuehne, Jr. and ex-wife Pam Kuehne. His father is a successful lawyer and businessman who says he was a hard-driving parent: "I don't think my kids are competitive by accident." All three children have won USGA championships, a unique feat in the organization's history. His sister Kelli scored back-to-back victories at the U.S. Women's Amateur in 1995 and 1996 before turning pro in 1998, while brother Hank, before joining the PGA Tour in 1999, won the 1998 U.S. Amateur with Trip as his caddie.

He lives with wife Dusti and son Will in Irving, Texas, and owns his own Dallas-based financial company, Double Eagle Capital, which he started in 2005 after working as a hedge fund manager for Legg Mason. His home club is the Vaquero Club at Westlake, Texas.

== Results in major championships ==
Tournament	1995	1996	1997	1998	1999	2000	2001	2002	2003	2004	2005	2006	2007	2008
Masters Tournament	CUT													CUT
U.S. Open		T79							T57LA		CUT		CUT	

Note: Kuehne only played in the Masters and the U.S. Open.

Did not play

LA = Low amateur
CUT = missed the half-way cut
"T" = tied

== U.S. national team appearances ==
Amateur

- Walker Cup: 1995, 2003, 2007 (winners)
- Eisenhower Trophy: 2006
