= PGA Tour on television =

PGA Tour's involvement in televisions

The PGA Tour's broadcast television rights are held by CBS Sports and NBC Sports, under contracts most recently renewed in 2021 to last through 2030. While it considered invoking an option to opt out of its broadcast television contracts in 2017, the PGA Tour ultimately decided against doing so. Golf Channel (which, since the acquisition of NBC Universal by Golf Channel owner Comcast, is a division of NBC Sports) has served as the pay television rightsholder of the PGA Tour since 2007, and its current contract will also expire in 2021. Under the contracts, CBS broadcasts weekend coverage for an average of 20 events per-season, and NBC broadcasts weekend coverage for an average of 10 events per-season. Golf Channel broadcasts early-round and weekend morning coverage of all events, as well as weekend coverage of events not broadcast on terrestrial television, and primetime encores of all events. Tournaments typically featured in NBC's package include marquee events such as The Players Championship, the final three tournaments of the FedEx Cup Playoffs, and the biennial Presidents Cup event. The 2011 contract granted more extensive digital rights, as well as the ability for NBC to broadcast supplemental coverage of events on Golf Channel during its broadcast windows.

== Historical breakdown ==
=== 1950s ===
NBC first began televising golf events after it was awarded the television rights to the U.S. Open in 1954. The tournament continued to air on NBC through the 1965 event, however NBC rebuffed a long-term deal to broadcast the event when the United States Golf Association (USGA) decided on a true contract in 1966. The network, however, did televise a handful of PGA Tour events over the following decades. For example, NBC's broadcast of the 1962 Tournament of Champions as the first color golf telecast. Five years later, NBC broadcast the Hawaiian Open Golf Tournament, which was the first live color sports transmission from Hawaii to the U.S. mainland.

In the United Kingdom, the Open Championship was historically broadcast by the BBC—a relationship which lasted from 1955 to 2015. The BBC's rights to the Open had been threatened by the event's removal from Category A of Ofcom's "listed" events, a status which legally mandated that the Open be broadcast in its entirety by a terrestrial broadcaster. It had since been moved to Category B, meaning that television rights to the tournament could now be acquired by a pay television outlet, such as BT Sport or Sky Sports, as long as rights to broadcast a highlights programme are given to one of the main terrestrial broadcasters.

CBS has televised the Masters Tournament in the United States every year since 1956, when it used six cameras and covered only the final four holes.

While Augusta National Golf Club has consistently chosen CBS as its U.S. broadcast partner, it has done so on successive one-year contracts. Due to the lack of long-term contractual security, as well as the club's limited dependence on broadcast rights fees (owing to its affluent membership), it is widely held that CBS allows Augusta National greater control over the content of the broadcast, or at least perform some form of self-censorship, in order to maintain future rights. The club, however, has insisted it does not make any demands with respect to the content of the broadcast.

There are some controversial aspects to this relationship. Announcers refer to the gallery as "patrons" rather than spectators or fans ("gallery" itself is also used), and use the term "second cut" instead of "rough" (however, the second cut is normally substantially shorter than comparable "primary rough" at other courses). Announcers who have been deemed not to have acted with the decorum expected by the club have been removed, notably Jack Whitaker and analyst Gary McCord. Whitaker referred to the gallery at the end of the 18-hole Monday playoff in 1966 as a "mob" and missed five years (1967–1971); McCord last worked on the Masters telecast in 1994, being banned that summer after using the terms "bikini wax" and "body bags" in his descriptions. There also tends to be a lack of discussion of any controversy involving Augusta National, such as the 2003 Martha Burk protests. However, there have not been many other major issues in recent years.

Frank Chirkinian was known as the 'father of televised golf' for the impact he had on golf broadcasting. He came to the attention of CBS after he impressed with his direction of the 1958 PGA Championship. Recruited by the network, who had no one with expertise in the relatively new field of golf broadcasting, he went on to be executive producer of CBS's golf coverage from 1959 to 1996. During his time at CBS, he was nicknamed "The Ayatollah" for his brusque, uncompromising approach to directing broadcasts. Chirkinian was particularly well regarded for the coverage of the Masters Tournament that he oversaw for four decades, working closely with the management of Augusta National to ensure they were satisfied. Following his retirement, he remained a consultant to CBS for golf coverage.

=== 1960s ===
ABC broadcast golf events for the first time in 1962 when it began televising the Open Championship as part of its anthology series Wide World of Sports. The network later gained the broadcast rights to the PGA Championship in 1965, and the U.S. Open in 1966. Chris Schenkel and Byron Nelson were the initial hosts of the tournament coverage.

=== 1970s ===
Beginning in the mid-1970s, ABC Sports used Barry White's "Love's Theme" as the opening theme music for its live golf telecasts; this theme was finally retired midway through 1997 with the reorganization of ABC's golf coverage. A new generic sports theme was used through the broadcasts from 1997 to 1999; however, a distinct separate theme would close the broadcasts. From the WGC event at the end of 1999 through the 2003 season, another theme was introduced which was more authoritative and heroic in style than the previous theme. The closing music from 1997 was retained to close the broadcasts during this period. Additionally, the network's coverage of The Open Championship used its own distinct theme during this period.

In 1975, Jim McKay and Dave Marr became the lead broadcast team on ABC, while Bob Rosburg joined the network as the first ever on-course reporter, and Peter Alliss joined as a co-anchor.

=== 1980s ===
Beginning in 1982, ABC adopted its most well-known format of the Wide World of Sports era. The broadcast operated using anchor teams, in which an anchor and an analyst would call all of the action from the tower at the 18th hole, and the teams would be rotated on coverage after about a half-hour. Meanwhile, the three on-course reporters, which included Judy Rankin and Ed Sneed in addition to Rosburg, would be utilized when prompted by the anchor team. McKay and Marr would be the lead team, with Jack Whitaker and Alliss as the second team. Occasionally, Rosburg or Whitaker would host if McKay was unavailable, while Roger Twibell would take over the secondary team. After his 1986 Masters win, Jack Nicklaus would appear on ABC after the end of his round and served as an analyst for the rest of the telecast. Nicklaus held his position of entering the booth during the major championship telecasts through the period from 1992 to 1996.

The USA Network began first and second round Masters coverage in 1982, which was also produced by the CBS production team. This was the first ever cable coverage for one of the golf majors. Initially, the USA Network provided Thursday and Friday coverage for 2 hours live each day along with a prime time replay.

On August 9, 1982, ABC purchased a 10% stake in the Entertainment and Sports Programming Network (ESPN) for $20 million; in exchange for the interest, ESPN gained the U.S. television rights to the Open Championship, which ABC had not been able to broadcast in its entirety. The purchase provided ABC the option of purchasing additional shares of up to 49% under certain conditions, which included the option to purchase at least 10% of Getty Oil's shares in the channel prior to January 2, 1984.

In 1983, NBC televised the first Skins Game ever held, with Vin Scully and Ben Crenshaw serving as announcers for the tournament broadcast. From 1983 to 1989, Scully juggled duties for both golf and Major League Baseball telecasts for NBC, usually teaming with Lee Trevino. The only notable affiliate not to televise the first event was KYW-TV (now a CBS owned-and-operated station) in Philadelphia. In 1991, coverage of the Skins Game moved to ABC Sports, after NBC obtained the rights to broadcast Notre Dame college football games.

After Vin Scully left NBC Sports following the network's loss of the Major League Baseball package to CBS, Bryant Gumbel, who was still co-hosting Today at the time, took over as NBC's primary golf anchor.

In the United States, the Ryder Cup was first televised live at the 1983 matches in Florida, with ABC Sports covering just the final four holes of the singles matches. A highlight package of the 1985 singles matches was produced by ESPN, but no live coverage aired from England. In 1987, with the matches back in the United States, ABC covered both weekend days, but only in the late afternoon. Also in 1987, ABC provided approximately 2 1/2 hours of tournament coverage each on Saturday as well as Sunday. The network also previously covered the Sunday singles of the Ryder Cup in 1975 (with Jim McKay as the lead commentator) and 1979.

In 1989, USA Network began a long association with the Ryder Cup, by televising all three days live from England, the first live coverage of a Ryder Cup from Europe. This led to a one-year deal for the 1991 matches in South Carolina to be carried by NBC live on the weekend, with USA Network continuing to provide live coverage of the first day. All five sessions were broadcast for the first time. The success of the 1991 matches led to a contract extension with USA and NBC through 1997, marking a turning point in the competition's popularity. For the European matches, the first two days were taped and aired on delay in the U.S. Another extension with USA and NBC covering the 1999–2003 (later moved to 2004) competitions increased the number of hours of coverage to include the entire first day and most of the second day. Tape delay was still employed for competitions from Europe.

=== 1990s ===
In 1990, Roger Twibell took over as ABC's lead anchor, with Dave Marr as his analyst. Peter Alliss became sole anchor of the second anchor team. During this period, ABC acquired the rights to several non-major PGA Tour events, mostly important events such as the Memorial Tournament and The Tour Championship. 1990 would also mark the final PGA Championship to be broadcast by ABC.

The American Century Celebrity Golf Classic was held in 1990 and sponsored by NBC, which broadcasts the second- and third-round coverage. The game NBC Sports Real Golf was unveiled at the 17th annual American Century Championship Celebrity Golf Event and promoted during NBC's broadcast of the event. NBC generally televised around five regular PGA Tour events per season at this time. In 1991, the network acquired the broadcast rights to the Ryder Cup.

In 1991, NBC replaced Bryant Gumbel with Charlie Jones as their primary golf anchor and subsequently, Dick Enberg and (after the former left NBC Sports for CBS in the year 2000) Dan Hicks.

When TBS took over the cable package for the PGA Championship in 1991, they increased the weekday coverage to 6 hours per day. TBS also added 2 hours of Saturday and Sunday coverage. Because inclement weather stopped play during the third round of 2012 PGA Championship on Saturday, TNT added coverage starting at 8 a.m. ET on Sunday.

For the 1991 PGA Championship, Bob Neal and Bobby Clampett anchored the TBS coverage. TBS also used golf instructor David Leadbetter, former LPGA player Donna Caponi, and NFL analyst Pat Haden for the 1991 PGA Championship coverage. For the 1992 PGA Championship, TBS installed Leadbetter as its lead analyst. Gary Bender and MLB analyst Don Sutton were also part of the TBS crew.

In 1992, Brent Musburger, who had been heavily criticized for his hosting of golf coverage while with CBS, took over as ABC's host. Marr was dismissed from the network, while Twibell was reassigned to ESPN's golf coverage, although he occasionally hosted on ABC for a few lower-level tournaments. The format was also reorganized to more emphasize the on-course reporters. Steve Melnyk moved over from CBS to become lead analyst; however, Alliss would anchor for stretches during the telecast. Beyond the team in the booth, all of ABC's other voices were on the course, including Rankin, Rosburg and newcomer Mark Rolfing.

In 1993, ABC used Peter Jacobsen as lead analyst; however, Jacobsen returned to playing in 1994 and Melnyk returned to the lead analyst position.

The final round of the 1994 Masters was the final on-air assignment for Pat Summerall on CBS Sports. CBS had lost the rights to the National Football Conference to Fox (where Summerall and his broadcasting colleague, John Madden would soon move over to) prior to the 1994 NFL season. But much like Vin Scully did in 1982 after calling his final NFL game (the NFC Championship Game between the San Francisco 49ers and Dallas Cowboys), Pat Summerall stayed at CBS a couple more months so he could make the 1994 Masters his final broadcast for CBS, where he was a mainstay for over 30 years.

CBS covered the first three Presidents Cups (1994, 1996 and 1998). Beginning in 2000, the American broadcast television rights moved over to NBC, who has held it ever since.

On the weekday cable side, ESPN like CBS covered the first three President Cup. TNT then carried the Presidents Cup from 2000 to 2007; Golf Channel assumed those rights beginning with the 2009 event as part of its overall deal for PGA Tour cable rights.

In 1995, USA expanded their Thursday/Friday Masters coverage to 2.5 hours each day.

Also in 1995, NBC Sports acquired rights to the USGA championships, including the U.S. Open, from ESPN/ABC. ESPN retained rights to a portion of the weekday coverage, however, NBC was the dominant rights holder, including exclusive coverage of the weekend rounds. This took NBC's coverage to a new level and marked the first time in the modern era of television that the network had televised a major championship. NBC, the Yanni composed theme music, "In Celebration of Man", and its lead analyst Johnny Miller (who joined NBC in 1990) became synonymous with the U.S. Open, televising it for the next 20 years, through 2014.

Beginning with the 1995 PGA Championship, Ernie Johnson, Jr. became the primary golf anchor for Turner. Dave Marr served as the lead analyst for TBS during their 1995 PGA Championship coverage. By the 1996 PGA Championship, Bobby Clampett once again assumed the lead Turner analyst role. Also for the 1996 PGA Championship, former LPGA player Mary Bryan moved over from CBS to join the TBS team.

In May 1997, right after Tiger Woods won his first Masters, the PGA Tour announced a $400 million, four-year broadcasting agreement for 1999–2002 with NBC, ABC, CBS, ESPN, USAand the Golf Channel.

On November 1, 1997, during the third round of the 1997 Tour Championship, ABC employees staged a one-day boycott after an employee was disciplined for drawing an obscene cartoon of Walt Disney Company chairman Michael Eisner (Disney had purchased ABC two years prior). ABC showed final round coverage of the 1996 Tour Championship in the broadcast window.

After facing much criticism for its golf coverage, especially Jack Nicklaus' involvement and Brent Musburger's perceived lack of knowledge of the game, ABC decided to completely overhaul its visual presentation, becoming more in line with cable partner ESPN, while changing the format for its coverage to be more of the standard in line with the other networks, featuring a lead anchor team, announcers assigned to individual holes, and on-course reporters. Mike Tirico became the host, with Curtis Strange serving as lead analyst. Steve Melnyk, Peter Alliss and Ian Baker-Finch became hole announcers, while Bob Rosburg, Judy Rankin and Rolfing were the primary on-course reporters.

To compensate the extra telecasts, ABC added several members to its broadcasting team. Rolfing left to return to NBC and was replaced by Billy Ray Brown. Gary Smith and Mark McCumber (who had worked for the network part-time in 1998) also joined as on-course reporters. Strange and Tirico worked every event, however the other members of the on-air broadcast team generally took weeks off, appearing on certain events. McCumber left ABC after 1999, followed by Smith after 2002; Rosburg began to drastically cut his schedule in 2003. Melnyk became an on-course reporter for the 2003 Tour broadcasts, replacing Smith. Brandel Chamblee replaced Melnyk as a hole announcer.

Fox Sports partnered with Greg Norman in the early 1990s to create a world golf tour, which would have consisted of six events televised on Fox. However, PGA Tour commissioner Tim Finchem threatened to suspend any player participating in the events, and as a result created the World Golf Championships events, which were televised by CBS and ABC.

Fox Sports bid for a portion of the television rights starting in 1999, but the PGA Tour declined the offer.

Fox Sports Net served as a simulcast outlet for The Golf Channel's early round telecasts from 1999 to 2002. The Golf Channel had limited carriage, and FSN expanded the viewing audience, however the telecasts were complete Golf Channel telecasts and made no reference to Fox.

From 1999 to 2002 and 2004 to 2006, ABC broadcast the Bob Hope Classic. CBS covered the Bob Hope Classic in 2003 due to ABC holding the broadcast rights to Super Bowl XXXVII, which overlapped with the tournament. Prior to 2007, USA Network and ESPN/ABC consistently covered all four courses used for the event, with the primary camera crew covering PGA West, although live coverage still emanated from the other courses. However, when Golf Channel took over the broadcast rights to the tournament, the network only assigned live coverage to PGA West (both the Palmer and Nicklaus courses). All other courses used did not receive live coverage at all, with the channel providing only an hourly highlights package of each day's action from those courses. This has been the approach consistently taken by Golf Channel in regards to tournaments with multiple courses, including the Pebble Beach National Pro-Am and the Walt Disney World Golf Classic.

Meanwhile, from 1999 to 2005, ABC broadcast Monday Night Golf, a series of seven match play golf challenge events, each of which involved #1 ranked World Golfer Tiger Woods. It marked the first time that a live golf event had been shown in prime time during the week in the United States. Monday Night Golf proved to be an initial success, drawing more viewers than the final round of the U.S. Open, and being second only to the final round of the Masters Tournament in terms of golf broadcasts. Ratings increased significantly for the second match, but declined rapidly for subsequent matches, and the event was finally discontinued after the 2005 edition.

=== 2000s ===
In July 2001, the PGA Tour announced a four-year television contract for 2003-2006 estimated in $850 million.

Beginning in 2004, TNT as well as CBS, began broadcasting the PGA Championship in HDTV.

In 2003 and 2004, both CBS and USA televised the Masters commercial-free.

Bob Rosburg retired after 2003, while Steve Melnyk and Brandel Chamblee left ABC. Ian Baker-Finch and Peter Alliss remained hole announcers in 2004, while ESPN's Andy North joined Brown and Rankin as an on-course reporter. Strange left ABC Sports in June 2004 due to a contract dispute, and was replaced as lead analyst for the rest of the season mostly by Baker-Finch, who also served as lead analyst for ESPN during this time. For the rest of the season, ABC had several active PGA players substitute as analysts alongside Baker-Finch, including Hal Sutton and Fred Couples. Nick Faldo worked The Open Championship and caught the eye of ABC producers.

When TNT took over the American cable package for the Open in 2003, they started providing 2 hours of early morning coverage on both weekend days prior to the start of ABC's air-time. During the 2006 Open Championship, Mike Tirico filled in for Ernie Johnson, Jr., who was undergoing chemotherapy. Tirico was also hosting ABC's coverage that week, leading to 11-hour shifts for him. In the past, TNT owned cable rights to the Open Championship, as well as the Women's British Open and Senior British Open, from 2003 to 2009 (with ABC picking up weekend coverage), replacing (and ultimately being replaced by) ESPN. TNT also carried the biennial PGA Tour-managed Presidents Cup from 2000 to 2007; Golf Channel assumed those rights beginning with the 2009 event as part of its overall deal for PGA Tour cable rights.

It was announced before the 2004 Tour Championship that Nick Faldo and Paul Azinger would become the lead analysts for ABC's tour coverage starting at the 2004 Tour Championship. The two, whose pairing was met with wide praise and acclaim by critics, had formerly been playing rivals and had gone head-to-head in both The Open Championship and the Ryder Cup. With Faldo and Azinger on board, Baker-Finch was moved back to being a hole announcer. The rest of the team remained intact, with the addition of Terry Gannon as an occasional host or hole announcer. In the spring of 2006, Judy Rankin was diagnosed with breast cancer, resulting in ESPN's Billy Kratzert replacing her as an on-course reporter while she sought treatment.

In 2004, ABC cut away from the final round of the Buick Classic PGA Tour golf tournament at 7:00 p.m. Eastern and Central Time Zones to show a rerun of America's Funniest Home Videos. Three players were involved in a sudden-death shootout when ABC signed off from its coverage. The shootout round was seen on ABC stations on the West Coast until the end of the match.

Since 2004, all of CBS's golf broadcasts outside of the Masters have featured super slow motion video of golfers' shots from a super slow motion camera used for swing analysis by Peter Kostis. The camera was known as "CBS Swing Vision" during its first year; it gained sponsorship from Konica Minolta the next season, an arrangement that has lasted over a decade. The feature was known as the "Konica Minolta SwingVision camera" in 2005, the "Bizhub SwingVision camera" from 2006 to 2008, and the "Konica Minolta Bizhub SwingVision camera" since 2009. The camera is actually provided by Tech Imaging Services, not Konica Minolta, which merely sponsors the feature to promote its Bizhub line of printers (Konica Minolta was previously well known as a still-image camera manufacturer but sold that product line to Sony in 2006). The cameras are present and used at the Masters, however they are not branded or sponsored.

In 2005, CBS broadcast the tournament with high-definition fixed and handheld wired cameras, as well as standard-definition wireless handheld cameras. Meanwhile, USAincreased the Thursday/Friday coverage to 3 hours.

In January 2006, the PGA Tour announced a new set of television deals covering 2007 to 2012, increase the number of events covered by NBC Sports from five to ten. The deal also renewed broadcast deals for the Ryder Cup and the USGA Championships, including the U.S. Open. NBC is the only network which provide four days of major tournament coverage; CBS, which airs the Masters and the PGA Championship, only provides weekend coverage of its tournaments. The new TV rights fee was believed have a "notably smaller" than the previous one.

NBC carried the weekend coverage of the JELD-WEN Tradition in 2007, 2009 and 2010. Golf Channel covered the early rounds (and all four rounds in 2008 while NBC carried the Summer Olympic Games from Beijing). NBC carried a tape delayed broadcast of the World Series of Golf, which was held from May 13 to 16, 2007, on June 23 and 24 of that year; the 2008 event of the series, played from May 12 to 15, and was televised by CBS on June 28 and 29.

Also in early 2006, it was announced that both ESPN and ABC would lose their respective television rights to the PGA Tour after that season. Mike Tirico was given the position as lead announcer for Monday Night Football; he left the golf team following the Deutsche Bank Championship in September. Gannon took over as lead host for the remainder of ABC's final season. Coinciding with the network's coverage of the Deutsche Bank event, ABC Sports was rebranded as ESPN on ABC as part of the cable channel's increased oversight of the network's sports division, with ESPN graphics being used on the ABC telecasts.

Prior to 2007, ESPN and ABC shared some announcers, but the main ABC coverage team did not generally work on ESPN except for events that ABC had weekend rights to, in which case the full ABC team would work on ESPN's weekday telecasts. After losing PGA Tour rights following the 2006 season, what remained of ESPN and ABC's coverage team's merged, as did the production, with all ABC broadcasts being branded as ESPN broadcasts as part of ESPN on ABC.

In 2007, CBS added "Masters Extra," an hour's extra full-field bonus coverage daily on the internet, preceding the television broadcasts. In 2008, CBS added full coverage of holes 15 and 16 live on the web. The 2007 Masters was also the final event for USA Sports, which was dissolved into parent NBC Sports after the tournament. All future sports telecasts on USA would use NBC's graphics and personalities.

Also in 2007, ESPN and ABC covered just the first two rounds of the US Open and the final two rounds of the Open Championship. Ian Baker-Finch and Nick Faldo both moved to CBS, while Billy Ray Brown moved to the Golf Channel. Andy North, Billy Kratzert and a fully healthy Judy Rankin became the on-course reporters for both ESPN and ABC. For the ABC telecasts of the Open, the 2006 booth team made a special return, including CBS's Faldo. Alliss and Terry Gannon served as hole announcers for the telecast. Meanwhile, The Shark Shootout was moved to December, and was broadcast live by both Golf Channel and NBC. The event was originally broadcast in the United States by sister cable channel USA Network, and CBS – with USA broadcasting the first round on a tape-delayed basis, and CBS handling the second round live. The final round was not broadcast live to the entire country, as CBS' commitment to the NFL only allowed the round as it took place to air in the Eastern and Central Time Zones, with the rest of the U.S. seeing the event beginning at 4:00 p.m. Eastern Time.

In 2008, ESPN reorganized its golf coverage, obtaining the broadcast rights to The Masters from USA; all tournament coverage on both ESPN and ABC was identical, with the exception of the Masters telecasts, which were produced by CBS. Additionally, ABC telecasts did not use the experimental top-screen scoring banner that was used on ESPN's telecasts used in 2008 and 2009. Nick Faldo did not return as an announcer and was not replaced; Mike Tirico and Paul Azinger became the lead booth announcers. Curtis Strange returned to the network, joining Gannon and Tom Weiskopf as a hole announcer. North, Rankin and Kratzert remained on-course reporters; Alliss became an analyst for holes that Gannon was assigned to.

ABC's final live telecast was the 2009 Open Championship, in which Tom Watson nearly won the championship at the age of 59. Watson had worked for ABC as a guest analyst at the previous year's Open and had been scheduled to do so again. Starting in 2010, the Open Championship would not be aired live on a major broadcast network at all, with all four rounds airing on ESPN and ABC providing only edited highlights of the event.

=== 2010s ===
ESPN moved all live golf coverage to cable in 2010, with ABC being relegated to carrying a three-hour encore presentation of the day's Open Championship rounds starting at 3:00 p.m. Eastern Time. ESPN reorganized the broadcast team for its coverage that year with several additions and changes, however Mike Tirico and Paul Azinger remained the lead announcers through the end of ESPN's coverage of golf in 2015.

In 2013, NBC reached a deal to extend its rights to the Ryder Cup and Senior PGA Championship through 2030, with Friday coverage of the Ryder Cup being assumed by Golf Channel.

The Ryder Cup contract, which stipulated cable coverage air on USA, was still controlled by NBC even after it granted ESPN the rights to Friday cable coverage (normally the only day of the event covered on cable). However, in 2010, rain on Friday pushed the singles matches to Monday, necessitating that they air on cable. With NBC having granted only Friday rights to ESPN, the singles matches aired on USA, which would be the final golf telecast for the network. Four months later, NBC merged with Golf Channel, making Golf Channel NBC's primary cable outlet for golf.

On August 6, 2013, Fox Sports announced a 12-year deal to broadcast the three open championships of the USGA: the U.S. Open, Women's Open, and Senior Open, beginning in 2015. Fox succeeded the USGA's long-term relationships with NBC Sports and ESPN. Fox, which has televised just one PGA Tour sanctioned event in its history (the unofficial CVS Charity Classic in 2011), paid $1 billion for full rights to all USGA championships.

The Fox network airs the final two days of the U.S. Open, Women's Open, Senior Open, and Amateur, as well as late coverage of the first two days of the U.S. Open. The rest of the coverage airs on Fox Sports 1. Also, the final two days of the U.S. Open air on Spanish-language channel Fox Deportes.

On April 23, 2014, Fox Sports announced that Greg Norman would join Joe Buck as its lead golf commentary team. Buck and Norman worked together for the first time at the 2014 U.S. Open, where Fox produced studio programming that aired against ESPN and NBC's studio shows.

In June 2015, the Fox family covered the U.S. Open for the first time, from Chambers Bay in University Place, Washington, southwest of Tacoma. Fox Sports 1 aired preview programming hosted by Holly Sonders on the Tuesday and Wednesday prior to the championship.

On June 8, 2015, it was announced that NBC Sports had acquired rights to The Open Championship beginning in 2017 under a 12-year deal; after former broadcaster ESPN opted out of the final year of rights, NBC began coverage in 2016 instead. Early round coverage is aired by Golf Channel, which marked the first time ever that Golf Channel had ever broadcast one of the four Men's major golf championships. On May 3, 2016, NBC announced that Golf Channel would air the bulk of the men's and women's golf tournaments for the 2016 Summer Olympics, covering up to 300 hours of the tourney, with 130 of those hours live. Mike Tirico made his on-air debut with NBC during the 2016 Open Championship.

The 2015 edition of the U.S. Open had a total of 38.5 hours of coverage in the United States, with 22 hours being on Thursday and Friday, and 16.5 hours being on Saturday and Sunday; the Fox Sports 1 cable network had a total of 16 hours of coverage on Thursday and Friday. The Fox broadcast network had a total of 22.5 hours of coverage Thursday through Sunday, with six hours Thursday and Friday, and 16.5 hours Saturday and Sunday. Fox utilized a number of new technologies during its production, including drone flyovers, a camera-equipped RC car for ground perspectives, and new graphics—including a live shot tracer, an augmented reality display of green contours, and a persistent top-5 leaderboard displayed in the bottom-right of the screen.

Later in December 2015, ESPN returned live golf to ABC with the announcement that the final round of the CME Group Tour Championship on the LPGA Tour would be broadcast on the network. A scaled down version of the ESPN/ABC crew worked the event. ABC broadcast this event until 2018, as NBC took over their coverage the following year.

In Australia, from 2015 Fox Sports Australia is the exclusive broadcaster of the U.S. Open until 2018.

In January 2016, Greg Norman was let go by Fox in response to poor reception towards his performance during the U.S. Open and was replaced by former ESPN analyst Paul Azinger. The network's 2016 U.S. Open team:

For the 2016 season, ESPN's golf production team disbanded, as Masters coverage was produced by CBS with CBS announcers.

Also in January 2016, former CBS analyst David Feherty joined NBC to become a full-time contributor for its coverage and Golf Channel. Feherty already hosted a self-titled series for Golf Channel. Long-time ESPN personality Mike Tirico made his on-air debut with NBC during the 2016 Open Championship.

NBC and Golf Channel broadcast the revived golf tournaments at the 2016 Summer Olympics, as part of NBC Olympic coverage. NBC staff served as the host broadcaster for the golf events on behalf of Olympic Broadcasting Services (OBS).

The 2016 Ryder Cup was also televised in the United States NBC (along with Golf Channel), which planned to provide 170 hours of coverage. In the United Kingdom and Ireland, the event was broadcast by Sky Sports; the broadcaster re-branded its Sky Sports 4 channel as Sky Sports Ryder Cup for the week of the event, and planned to broadcast 240 hours of coverage.

Beginning in 2016, Sky Sports will have exclusive UK rights to The Open with the BBC showing a 2-hour highlights programme every night instead of live coverage. Sky's major event coverage is fronted by David Livingstone, expert analysis from Butch Harmon, on course commentary from Howard Clark, in-depth 18th hole interviews from tour coach and golfing expert, Tim Barter and main commentary from Ewen Murray and Bruce Critchley. Other golfers such as Peter Oosterhuis, Tony Johnstone, Thomas Bjørn, David Howell, Richard Boxall, Jamie Spence, Mark Roe, Robert Lee, Ross McFarlane, Sandy Lyle, Colin Montgomerie, Paul McGinley, Philip Parkin and Ken Brown contributing to their coverage over the years.

For the 2018 U.S. Open, Fox announced that they would be splitting their lead commentary booths into two teams. This was done in an effort to avoid the occasional logjam caused by a three-man booth, which had been Joe Buck with analysts Paul Azinger and Brad Faxon. Therefore, Azinger would now be paired with Buck, and Faxon would be paired alongside Shane Bacon.

On October 10, 2018, it was announced that ESPN would replace TNT as the PGA Championship's cable partner beginning in 2020, with CBS remaining broadcast television rightsholder. This deal left TNT without any golf coverage.

=== 2020s ===
In 2020, NBC renewed its rights to the PGA Tour through 2030 under an eight-year deal beginning in 2022. While NBC will still air an average of 8 tournaments per-year, coverage of the final three FedEx Cup playoff events will now alternate between CBS and NBC.

On June 29, 2020, it was announced that Fox had withdrawn from its contract to carry USGA tournaments, and had sold the remaining seven years of the contract to NBC Sports through 2027. This was reported that the rescheduling of the professional championships caused by the COVID-19 pandemic was a factor in the decision, and that Fox had originally discussed working with NBC before negotiating the withdrawal instead.

== See also ==
- PGA Tour#Media coverage
- Sports broadcasting contracts in the United States#Golf
- History of Masters Tournament broadcasting
- List of The Open Championship broadcasters
- List of PGA Championship broadcasters
- List of U.S. Open (golf) broadcasters
- List of Ryder Cup broadcasters
- List of ESPN/ABC golf commentators
- List of PGA Tour on CBS commentators
- Golf on Fox#Commentators
- Golf Channel#Notable personalities
- Golf on NBC#Commentators
- Golf on TNT Sports#Commentators
- Golf on USA#Commentators
