= List of PGA Championship broadcasters =

The PGA Championship is televised in the United States by CBS and ESPN. ESPN holds rights to early-round and weekend morning coverage and airs supplemental coverage through its digital subscription service ESPN+ during CBS's weekend broadcast windows. They started in 2020, replacing TNT. CBS holds rights to afternoon coverage of the weekend rounds. ABC had historically broadcast the tournament until 1991, when it moved to CBS.

== Broadcasters by territory ==
The current broadcasters (correct as of 2019) of the PGA Championship are:

Territory	Broadcaster
Australia	Fox Sports
Belgium	BETV / Telenet
Bulgaria	MTEL
Canada	TSN / RDS
China	CCTV / IQIYI
Czech Republic	Golf Channel
France	Canal +
Germany	Sky Deutschland
Greece	Forthnet S.A. (NOV A)
Iceland	365
India	ATR (1Sports)
Italy	Sky Italia
Japan	TV Tokyo / JGN
Latin America	ESPN
Netherlands	Ziggo Sport
New Zealand	Sky
Pacific Islands	FIJI Television LTD
Pan Asia	Fox Sports Asia
Poland	ITI Neovision
Portugal	Sport TV
Scandinavia	Viasat
South Africa	Supersport
South Korea	Coupang Play
Spain	Movistar
Taiwan	Sportcast
Turkey	Saran
United Kingdom	Sky Sports
United States	ESPN / CBS
Yugoslavia (Former)	Adria Media - Golf Klub

== Coverage overview ==
=== CBS (1958–1964; 1991–present) ===
CBS has long-term deals for the PGA Championship (initially from 1958 to 1964 and again starting in 1991).

Frank Chirkinian was known as the 'father of televised golf' for the impact he had on golf broadcasting. He came to the attention of CBS after he impressed with his direction of the 1958 PGA Championship. Recruited by the network, who had no one with expertise in the relatively new field of golf broadcasting, he went on to be executive producer of CBS's golf coverage from 1959 to 1996. During his time at CBS, he was nicknamed "The Ayatollah" for his brusque, uncompromising approach to directing broadcasts.

=== ABC (1965–1990) ===
ABC broadcast golf events for the first time in 1962 when it began televising the Open Championship as part of its anthology series Wide World of Sports. The network later gained the broadcast rights to the PGA Championship in 1965, and the U.S. Open in 1966. Chris Schenkel and Byron Nelson were the initial hosts of the tournament coverage. In 1975, Jim McKay and Dave Marr became the lead broadcast team, while Bob Rosburg joined the network as the first ever on-course reporter, and Peter Alliss joined as a co-anchor.

Beginning in 1982, ABC adopted its most well-known format of the Wide World of Sports era. The broadcast operated using anchor teams, in which an anchor and an analyst would call all of the action from the tower at the 18th hole, and the teams would be rotated on coverage after about a half-hour. Meanwhile, the three on-course reporters, which included Judy Rankin and Ed Sneed in addition to Rosburg, would be utilized when prompted by the anchor team. McKay and Marr would be the lead team, with Jack Whitaker and Alliss as the second team. Occasionally, Rosburg or Whitaker would host if McKay was unavailable, while Roger Twibell would take over the secondary team. After his 1986 Masters win, Jack Nicklaus would appear on ABC after the end of his round and served as an analyst for the rest of the telecast.

In 1990, Roger Twibell took over as lead anchor, with Dave Marr as his analyst. Peter Alliss became sole anchor of the second anchor team. During this period, ABC acquired the rights to several non-major PGA Tour events, mostly important events such as the Memorial Tournament and The Tour Championship. 1990 would also mark the final PGA Championship to be broadcast by ABC.

=== ESPN (1982−1990; 2020−present) ===
In 1982, ESPN provided the first cable television coverage of the PGA Championship with three hours on both Thursday and Friday. While there was no cable coverage of the first two rounds in 1984, ESPN returned for weekday coverage the following year and expanded to three and a half hours each day. And then in 1986, ESPN increased their weekday coverage to four hours.

On October 10, 2018, it was announced that ESPN had acquired cable rights to the tournament from 2020 to 2030. ESPN will, as with TNT, carry early-round and weekend morning coverage, but will also have the ability to offer supplemental coverage through its digital subscription service ESPN+ during CBS's weekend broadcast windows.

=== Turner Sports (1991–2019) ===
Until ESPN regained the rights following the 2019 PGA Championship, TNT had the cable rights to the PGA Championship (with full coverage of the first two rounds and early coverage of the weekend rounds since 1999 after being on sister channel TBS since 1991) under a contract with the PGA of America that runs through 2019.

When TBS took over the cable package for the PGA Championship in 1991, they increased the weekday coverage to 6 hours per day. TBS also added 2 hours of Saturday and Sunday coverage. Because inclement weather stopped play during the third round of 2012 PGA Championship on Saturday, TNT added coverage starting at 8 a.m. ET on Sunday.

For the 1991 PGA Championship, Bob Neal and Bobby Clampett anchored the TBS coverage. TBS also used golf instructor David Leadbetter, former LPGA player Donna Caponi, and NFL analyst Pat Haden for the 1991 PGA Championship coverage. For the 1992 PGA Championship, TBS installed Leadbetter as its lead analyst. Gary Bender and MLB analyst Don Sutton were also part of the TBS crew.

Beginning with the 1995 PGA Championship, Ernie Johnson Jr. became the primary golf anchor for Turner. During the 2006 PGA Championship, Verne Lundquist filled in on TNT for Johnson, who was undergoing chemotherapy. During TNT's Sunday coverage of the 2011 PGA Championship, Lundquist once again stepped in for Johnson after Johnson's father died. On both occasions, Lundquist was already on-site as a tower announcer for CBS's coverage.

Dave Marr served as the lead analyst for TBS during their 1995 PGA Championship coverage. By the 1996 PGA Championship, Bobby Clampett once again assumed the lead Turner analyst role. Also for the 1996 PGA Championship, former LPGA player Mary Bryan moved over from CBS to join the TBS team.

== Commentators ==
=== Play-by-play/anchors ===
Announcer	Years	Network(s)
Brian Anderson	2019	TNT
Gary Bender	1992	TBS
Ernie Johnson Jr.	1995–2005; 2007–2010; 2012–2018	TBS; TNT
Verne Lundquist	2006; 2011	TNT
Jim McKay	1958–1960; 1965–1987; 1989	CBS; ABC
Jim Nantz	1991–present	CBS
Bob Neal	1991–1994	TBS
Chris Schenkel	1961–1975	CBS; ABC
Jim Simpson	1986	ESPN
Pat Summerall	1991–1993	CBS
Roger Twibell	1987–1990	ESPN; ABC
Scott Van Pelt	2020–present	ESPN
Jack Whitaker	1988	ABC

=== Analysts ===
Announcer	Years	Network(s)
Ian Baker-Finch	2007–present	CBS; TNT
Mary Bryan	1995–1996	CBS; TBS
Donna Caponi	1991	TBS
Bobby Clampett	1991; 1996–2007	TBS; TNT
John Deer	1958–1964	CBS
Bruce Devlin	1986	ESPN
David Duval	2020–present	ESPN
Nick Faldo	2007–2022	CBS
Andre Iguodala	2018	TBS
Trevor Immelman	2017–present	CBS; TNT
David Leadbetter	1991–1994	TBS
Dave Marr	1970–1990	ABC
Gary McCord	1991–2019	CBS
Steve Melnyk	1991	CBS
Byron Nelson	1965–1974	ABC
Jack Nicklaus	1986–1990	ABC
Ken Venturi	1991–2001	CBS
Lanny Wadkins	2002–2006	CBS
Ben Wright	1991–1995	CBS

=== On-site reporters ===
Announcer	Years	Network(s)
Michael Eaves	2021−present	ESPN
Pat Haden	1991	TBS
Tom Rinaldi	2020	ESPN
Marty Smith	2021−present	ESPN
Don Sutton	1992	TBS
Gene Wojciechowski	2021−present	ESPN

== See also ==
- List of PGA Tour on CBS commentators
- List of ESPN/ABC golf commentators
- Golf on TNT § Commentators
