= List of The Open Championship broadcasters =

As of 2017, European Tour Productions serves as the host broadcaster for the Open Championship. The host broadcaster, as well as British and American broadcasters Sky Sports and NBC Sports respectively, utilized a total of 175 cameras during the 2016 tournament.

== Current broadcasters ==
Country/Region	2018	2019	2020	2021	2022	2023	2024	2025	2026	2027	2028
United Kingdom	Sky Sports										
Republic of Ireland	Sky Sports										
United States	NBC/USA Network										
Brazil	ESPN										
Latin America	ESPN										
Caribbean	ESPN										
South Africa	SuperSport										
Australia	Fox Sports										
Japan	TV Asahi						U-Next				
Hong Kong	Fox Sports										
South East Asia	Fox Sports										
Canada	TSN										
Spain	Movistar Golf										

== Coverage overview ==
In the United Kingdom, the Open Championship was historically broadcast by the BBC—a relationship which lasted from 1955 to 2015. The BBC's rights to the Open had been threatened by the event's removal from Category A of Ofcom's "listed" events, a status which legally mandated that the Open be broadcast in its entirety by a terrestrial broadcaster. It had since been moved to Category B, meaning that television rights to the tournament could now be acquired by a pay television outlet, such as BT Sport or Sky Sports, as long as rights to broadcast a highlights programme are given to one of the main terrestrial broadcasters.

Beginning in 2016, Sky Sports will have exclusive UK rights to The Open with the BBC showing a 2-hour highlights programme every night instead of live coverage. Sky's major event coverage is fronted by David Livingstone, expert analysis from Butch Harmon, on course commentary from Howard Clark, in-depth 18th hole interviews from tour coach and golfing expert, Tim Barter and main commentary from Ewen Murray and Bruce Critchley. Other golfers such as Peter Oosterhuis, Tony Johnstone, Thomas Bjørn, David Howell, Richard Boxall, Jamie Spence, Mark Roe, Robert Lee, Ross McFarlane, Sandy Lyle, Colin Montgomerie, Paul McGinley, Philip Parkin and Ken Brown contributing to their coverage over the years.

In the United States, ABC had historically held rights to the Open. Beginning in 2010 under an eight-year agreement, the Open moved exclusively to ABC's sister pay television channel ESPN, with only tape-delayed highlights shown on ABC. In June 2015, it was announced that NBC Sports would acquire rights to the Open Championship under a 12-year deal beginning in 2017; early round coverage airs on USA Network, with the main NBC network broadcasting live weekend coverage. The R&A cited NBC's successful broadcasts of Premier League football, which also primarily airs on weekend mornings in U.S. time zones, as an advantage of NBC's acquisition of The Open. Similarly to the BBC, ESPN chose to opt out of its final year of Open rights, causing NBC's rights to begin in 2016 instead.

=== Additional notes ===
==== Early ABC coverage ====
- ABC broadcast golf events for the first time in 1962 when it began televising the Open Championship as part of its anthology series Wide World of Sports. The network later gained the broadcast rights to the PGA Championship in 1965, and the U.S. Open in 1966. Chris Schenkel and Byron Nelson were the initial hosts of the tournament coverage. In 1975, Jim McKay and Dave Marr became the lead broadcast team, while Bob Rosburg joined the network as the first ever on-course reporter, and Peter Alliss joined as a co-anchor.

1982-1996

- Beginning in 1982, ABC adopted its most well-known format of the Wide World of Sports era. The broadcast operated using anchor teams, in which an anchor and an analyst would call all of the action from the tower at the 18th hole, and the teams would be rotated on coverage after about a half-hour. Meanwhile, the three on-course reporters, which included Judy Rankin and Ed Sneed in addition to Rosburg, would be utilized when prompted by the anchor team. McKay and Marr would be the lead team, with Jack Whitaker and Alliss as the second team. Occasionally, Rosburg or Whitaker would host if McKay was unavailable, while Roger Twibell would take over the secondary team. After his 1986 Masters win, Jack Nicklaus would appear on ABC after the end of his round and served as an analyst for the rest of the telecast. Nicklaus held his position of entering the booth during the major championship telecasts through the period from 1992 to 1996.
  - On August 9, 1982, ABC purchased a 10% stake in the Entertainment and Sports Programming Network (ESPN) for $20 million; in exchange for the interest, ESPN gained the U.S. television rights to the British Open, which ABC had not been able to broadcast in its entirety. The purchase provided ABC the option of purchasing additional shares of up to 49% under certain conditions, which included the option to purchase at least 10% of Getty Oil's shares in the channel prior to January 2, 1984.
- In 1990, Roger Twibell took over as lead anchor, with Dave Marr as his analyst. Peter Alliss became sole anchor of the second anchor team. During this period, ABC acquired the rights to several non-major PGA Tour events, mostly important events such as the Memorial Tournament and The Tour Championship. 1990 would also mark the final PGA Championship to be broadcast by ABC.
- In 1992, Brent Musburger, who had been heavily criticized for his hosting of golf coverage while with CBS, took over as host. Marr was dismissed from the network, while Twibell was reassigned to ESPN's golf coverage, although he occasionally hosted on ABC for a few lower-level tournaments. The format was also reorganized to more emphasize the on-course reporters. Steve Melnyk moved over from CBS to become lead analyst; however, Alliss would anchor for stretches during the telecast. Beyond the team in the booth, all of ABC's other voices were on the course, including Rankin, Rosburg and newcomer Mark Rolfing.
- In 1993, ABC used Peter Jacobsen as lead analyst; however, Jacobsen returned to playing in 1994 and Melnyk returned to the lead analyst position.

==== Later ABC and ESPN coverage ====
1997-2005

- After facing much criticism for its golf coverage, especially Nicklaus' involvement and Musburger's perceived lack of knowledge of the game, ABC decided to completely overhaul its visual presentation, becoming more in line with cable partner ESPN, while changing the format for its coverage to be more of the standard in line with the other networks, featuring a lead anchor team, announcers assigned to individual holes, and on-course reporters. Mike Tirico became the host, with Curtis Strange serving as lead analyst. Steve Melnyk, Peter Alliss and Ian Baker-Finch became hole announcers, while Bob Rosburg, Judy Rankin and Rolfing were the primary on-course reporters.
  - To compensate the extra telecasts, ABC added several members to its broadcasting team. Rolfing left to return to NBC and was replaced by Billy Ray Brown. Gary Smith and Mark McCumber (who had worked for the network part-time in 1998) also joined as on-course reporters. Strange and Tirico worked every event, however the other members of the on-air broadcast team generally took weeks off, appearing on certain events. McCumber left ABC after 1999, followed by Smith after 2002; Rosburg began to drastically cut his schedule in 2003. Melnyk became an on-course reporter for the 2003 Tour broadcasts, replacing Smith. Brandel Chamblee replaced Melnyk as a hole announcer.
- Bob Rosburg retired after 2003, while Steve Melnyk and Brandel Chamblee left the network. Ian Baker-Finch and Peter Alliss remained hole announcers in 2004, while ESPN's Andy North joined Brown and Rankin as an on-course reporter. Strange left ABC Sports in June 2004 due to a contract dispute, and was replaced as lead analyst for the rest of the season mostly by Baker-Finch, who also served as lead analyst for ESPN during this time. For the rest of the season, ABC had several active PGA players substitute as analysts alongside Baker-Finch, including Hal Sutton and Fred Couples. Nick Faldo worked The Open Championship and caught the eye of ABC producers. It was announced before the 2004 Tour Championship that Faldo and Paul Azinger would become the lead analysts for the network's tour coverage starting at the 2004 Tour Championship. The two, whose pairing was met with wide praise and acclaim by critics, had formerly been playing rivals and had gone head-to-head in both The Open Championship and the Ryder Cup. With Faldo and Azinger on board, Baker-Finch was moved back to being a hole announcer. The rest of the team remained intact, with the addition of Terry Gannon as an occasional host or hole announcer. In the spring of 2006, Judy Rankin was diagnosed with breast cancer, resulting in ESPN's Billy Kratzert replacing her as an on-course reporter while she sought treatment.

2006-2015

- In early 2006, it was announced that both ESPN and ABC would lose their respective television rights to the PGA Tour after that season. Mike Tirico was given the position as lead announcer for Monday Night Football; he left the golf team following the Deutsche Bank Championship in September. Gannon took over as lead host for the remainder of ABC's final season. Coinciding with the network's coverage of the Deutsche Bank event, ABC Sports was rebranded as ESPN on ABC as part of the cable channel's increased oversight of the network's sports division, with ESPN graphics being used on the ABC telecasts.
  - In 2007, ESPN and ABC covered just the first two rounds of the US Open and the final two rounds of the Open Championship. Ian Baker-Finch and Nick Faldo both moved to CBS, while Billy Ray Brown moved to the Golf Channel. Andy North, Billy Kratzert and a fully healthy Judy Rankin became the on-course reporters for both ESPN and ABC. For the ABC telecasts of the Open, the 2006 booth team made a special return, including CBS's Faldo. Alliss and Terry Gannon served as hole announcers for the telecast.
  - Prior to 2007, ESPN and ABC shared some announcers, but the main ABC coverage team did not generally work on ESPN except for events that ABC had weekend rights to, in which case the full ABC team would work on ESPN's weekday telecasts. After losing PGA Tour rights following the 2006 season, what remained of ESPN and ABC's coverage team's merged, as did the production, with all ABC broadcasts being branded as ESPN broadcasts as part of ESPN on ABC.
- In 2008, ESPN reorganized its golf coverage, obtaining the broadcast rights to The Masters; all tournament coverage on both ESPN and ABC was identical, with the exception of the Masters telecasts, which were produced by CBS. Additionally, ABC telecasts did not use the experimental top-screen scoring banner that was used on ESPN's telecasts used in 2008 and 2009. Nick Faldo did not return as an announcer and was not replaced; Mike Tirico and Paul Azinger became the lead booth announcers. Curtis Strange returned to the network, joining Gannon and Tom Weiskopf as a hole announcer. North, Rankin and Kratzert remained on-course reporters; Alliss became an analyst for holes that Gannon was assigned to. ABC's final live telecast was the 2009 Open Championship, in which Tom Watson nearly won the championship at the age of 59. Watson had worked for ABC as a guest analyst at the previous year's Open and had been scheduled to do so again.
- When TNT took over the American cable package for the Open in 2003, they started providing 2 hours of early morning coverage on both weekend days prior to the start of ABC's air-time.
  - During the 2006 Open Championship, Mike Tirico filled in for Ernie Johnson Jr., who was undergoing chemotherapy. Tirico was also hosting ABC's coverage that week, leading to 11-hour shifts for him.
  - Long-time ESPN personality Mike Tirico made his on-air debut with NBC during the 2016 Open Championship.

==== NBC and Golf Channel ====
2016–present

- On June 8, 2015, it was announced that NBC Sports had acquired rights to The Open Championship beginning in 2017 under a 12-year deal; after former broadcaster ESPN opted out of the final year of rights, NBC began coverage in 2016 instead. Early round coverage is aired by Golf Channel, which marked the first time ever that Golf Channel had ever broadcast one of the four Men's major golf championships. On May 3, 2016, NBC announced that Golf Channel would air the bulk of the men's and women's golf tournaments for the 2016 Summer Olympics, covering up to 300 hours of the tourney, with 130 of those hours live.

== Commentators ==
=== Play-by-play/anchors ===
Announcer	Years	Network(s)
Terry Gannon	2017–2018	NBC
Dan Hicks	2016-present	NBC
Ernie Johnson Jr.	2003–2005; 2007–2009	TNT
Jim McKay	1962–1967; 1975–1983; 1985–1988; 1990–1993; 1996–2001	ABC
Brent Musburger	1992–1996	ABC
Lou Palmer	1982–	ESPN
Chris Schenkel	1968–1974	ABC
Jim Simpson	1982–	ESPN
Mike Tirico	1997–present	ABC; ESPN; TNT; NBC
Roger Twibell	1990–1991	ABC
Jack Whitaker	1982–1989	ABC

=== Analysts ===
Announcer	Years	Network(s)
Peter Alliss	1975–2015	ABC; BBC; ESPN
Paul Azinger	2005–2015; 2019–2023	ABC; ESPN; NBC
Ian Baker-Finch	2004; 2008–2009	ABC; TNT
Bobby Clampett	2003–2007	TNT
Nick Faldo	2004–2007	ABC
Justin Leonard	2017–2018	NBC
Dave Marr	1970–1991	ABC
Steve Melnyk	1992; 1994–1997	ABC
Johnny Miller	2016-2018	NBC
Byron Nelson	1966–1974	ABC
Curtis Strange	1998–2003, 2011-2015	ABC
Tom Watson	2008	ABC

== See also ==
- List of ESPN/ABC golf commentators
- List of NBC Sports golf commentators
  - Golf Channel#Notable personalities
- Golf on TNT#Commentators
- Timeline of golf on UK television
