= History of Masters Tournament broadcasting =

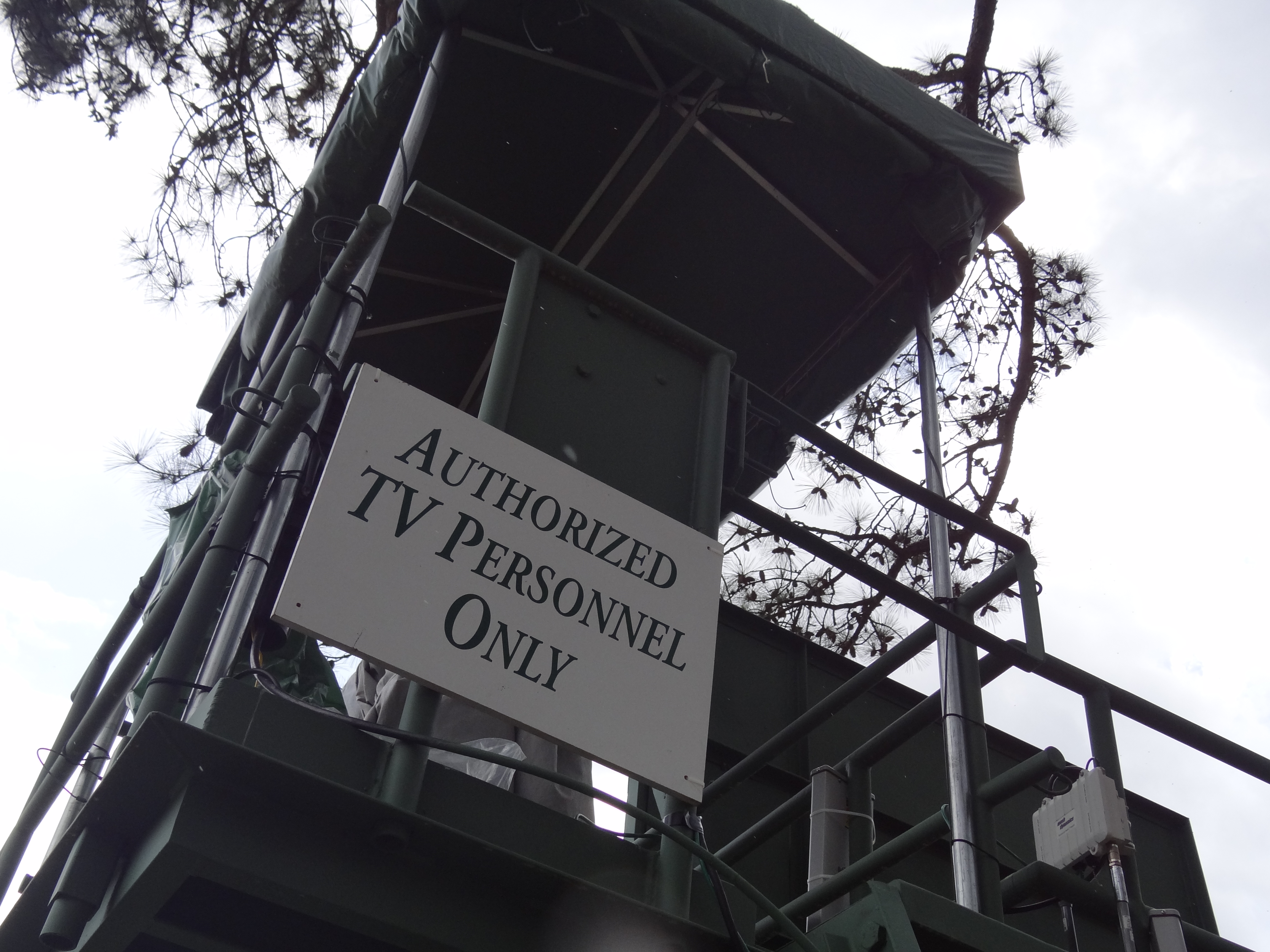
A sign at the Masters indicating an area for broadcast workers

The Masters golf tournament has been televised in the United States every year since 1956, primarily by CBS. It is now broadcast in over 200 countries.

CBS initially used six cameras and covered only on the final four holes. Tournament coverage of the first eight holes did not begin until 1995 because of resistance from the tournament organizers, but by 2007, more than 50 cameras were used. Augusta National chairman Jackson T. Stephens felt that the back nine was always more "compelling", increased coverage would increase the need for sponsors' spending on advertisements, and that broadcasting the front nine of the course would cut down on attendance and television viewership for the tournament.

USA Network added first- and second-round coverage in 1982. In 2008, ESPN replaced USA as the broadcaster of early-round coverage. These broadcasts use the CBS Sports production staff and commentators.

== United States ==
=== CBS (1956–present) ===
CBS has televised the Masters in the United States every year since 1956, when it used six cameras and covered only the final four holes. Because of resistance from the tournament organizers, 18 hole coverage did not begin until 2002 (coverage generally joining with the final group on the fifth or sixth hole all four days), but by 2006, over 50 cameras were used. USA Network added first- and second-round coverage in 1982, which was also produced by the CBS production team.

The previously independent USA Sports became part of NBC Sports through NBCUniversal in 2005, meaning the cable and network coverage of the Masters was split between rival companies. USA continued to use its own graphics for sports, and CBS continued to produce their coverage of the Masters, an arrangement that lasted through 2007. ESPN, another rival of CBS Sports, took over in 2008. However, ESPN uses CBS graphics and production with the CBS logo.

In 2007, CBS broadcast the tournament with high-definition fixed and handheld wired cameras, as well as standard-definition wireless handheld cameras. that same year, CBS also added "Masters Extra," an hour's extra full-field bonus coverage daily on the internet, preceding the television broadcasts. In 2008, CBS added full coverage of holes 15 and 16 live on the web.

While Augusta National Golf Club has consistently chosen CBS as its U.S. broadcast partner, it has done so on successive one-year contracts. Due to the lack of long-term contractual security, as well as the club's limited dependence on broadcast rights fees (owing to its affluent membership), it is widely held that CBS allows Augusta National greater control over the content of the broadcast, or at least perform some form of self-censorship, in order to maintain future rights. The club, however, has insisted it does not make any demands with respect to the content of the broadcast.

Announcers refer to "patrons" rather than spectators or fans (the word "gallery" is also used), and use the term "second cut" instead of "rough" (although the second cut is normally substantially shorter than comparable "primary rough" at other courses). Announcers who have been deemed not to have acted with the decorum expected by the club have been removed, notably Jack Whitaker and analyst Gary McCord. Whitaker referred to the crowd at the end of the 18-hole Monday playoff in 1966 as a "mob" and missed five years (1967–1971); McCord last worked on the Masters telecast in 1994, being banned that summer after using the terms "bikini wax" and "body bags" in his descriptions. There also tends to be a lack of discussion of any controversy involving Augusta National, such as the 2003 Martha Burk protests.

The 2020 Masters Tournament was delayed until November due to the COVID-19 pandemic. Schedule changes were made because of sunset around 5:24 p.m. and legal end of civil twilight at 5:51 p.m. each day. To accommodate CBS's coverage of the NFL Week 10 games (and, additionally, ensure that play would conclude before sunset), the final round was scheduled so that coverage could begin at 10:00 a.m. ET (similar to the 2019 Masters final round, which was moved up due to the threat of storms) and conclude around 2:30 p.m. ET.

On November 12, 2020, Sports Business Journal reported that the conclusion of the final round of the Masters on Sunday, November 15 could be broadcast on ABC, if weather or a playoff extended the action beyond 4 p.m., when CBS would transition to NFL coverage.

=== USA Network (1982–2007) ===
The USA Network began first and second round Masters coverage in 1982, which was also produced by the CBS production team. This was the first cable coverage for one of the golf majors.

=== ESPN (2008–present) ===
ESPN replaced USA in 2008 as the broadcaster for the early rounds. Early round coverage of The Masters continues to be aired by ESPN, but coverage is produced by CBS and uses CBS announcers and graphics (excluding Van Pelt, Strange, and Rinaldi).

== International coverage ==
In the United Kingdom, the BBC broadcast the Masters on television between 1963 and 2022, holding exclusive rights between 1986 and 2010. The BBC's coverage aired without commercials because it is financed by a licence fee. Coverage had previously been provided by ITV between 1979-1982 and Channel 4 between 1983 and 1985. From the 2011 Masters, Sky Sports began broadcasting all four days, as well as the par 3 contest in HD and, for the first time, in 3D. The BBC had highlights of the first two days' play but went head to head with Sky Sports, with full live coverage on the final two days of play. From 2020, live coverage moved to Sky on an exclusive basis, with the BBC showing highlights of each days play. In 2023, the BBC confirmed they would no longer bid for television coverage owing to the high cost. In 2025, Sky Sports extended their exclusive television rights to the Masters in the UK and Ireland, in a "multi-year" deal. On radio, the BBC provides live radio commentary on the closing stages on BBC Radio 5 Live.

In Ireland, Setanta Ireland previously showed all four rounds, and from 2017 until closure in 2021, Eir Sport broadcast all four rounds live having previously broadcast the opening two rounds with RTÉ broadcasting the weekend coverage. Sky Sports now shows the whole event exclusively live in Ireland, like in the UK.

In Canada, broadcast rights to the Masters are held by Bell Media, with coverage divided between TSN (cable), which carries live simulcasts and primetime encores of CBS and ESPN coverage for all four rounds, CTV (broadcast), which simulcasts CBS's coverage of the weekend rounds, and RDS, which carries French-language coverage. Prior to 2013, Canadian broadcast rights were held by a marketing company, Graham Sanborn Media, which in turn bought time on the Global Television Network, TSN, and RDS (except for 2012 when French-language coverage aired on TVA and TVA Sports) to air the broadcasts, also selling all of the advertising for the Canadian broadcasts. This was an unusual arrangement in Canadian sports broadcasting, as in most cases broadcasters acquire their rights directly from the event organizers or through partnerships with international rightsholders, such as ESPN International (ESPN owns a 20% minority stake in TSN). In 2013, Global and TSN began selling advertising directly, and jointly produced their own preview and highlights shows for Canadian audiences (while still carrying ESPN/CBS coverage for the tournament itself).

In Japan, Tokyo Broadcasting System Television has been the exclusive broadcaster since 1976.

In Australia, the tournament was broadcast live and free-to-air by the Seven Network until 2014, and on the Nine Network between 2018 and 2024. From 2025, exclusive rights have been held by Foxtel, with a dedicated streaming channel during the event.

In Spain, Canal+ held the Masters rights since the 1990s up until July 2015, when they were transferred to Telefónica after the Spanish telecommunications company bought Canal+. Movistar+' premium golf channel Movistar Golf airs the par 3 contest on Wednesday and live tournament coverage for all four rounds. #Vamos offers partial live coverage in simulcast with Movistar Golf as well as encore coverage shortly after the end of each round. In 2020 and for the first time, Movistar+ will have two separate live broadcasts of the Masters with Movistar Deportes airing live coverage of the Featured Groups, the Amen Corner and the 15th and 16th holes.

In France, the Masters is broadcast live on Canal+ and Canal+ Sport.

== See also ==
- List of PGA Tour on CBS commentators
- List of ESPN/ABC golf commentators
- PGA Tour on USA § Commentators
