= Golf on TNT Sports =

Live sports television series

TNT was the long-running holder of cable rights to the PGA Championship (with full coverage of the first two rounds and early coverage of the weekend rounds since 1999 after being on sister channel TBS since 1991) under a contract with the PGA of America. From 2003 to 2009, TNT also held the cable rights to The Open Championship.

The channel has generally only carried major competitions, as opposed to the other week-to-week tournaments which are under the auspices of the PGA Tour, an organization which is independent of the PGA of America.

Since 2020, TNT Sports has televised The Match, a series of exhibition matches with top professional golfers and professional athletes from other sports.

== Tournaments ==
- The Match (2020–present)
- PGA Championship (1991-2019, on TBS from 1991 through 1998)
- PGA Grand Slam of Golf (?-2014)
- The Open Championship (2003-2009)
- Women's British Open (2003-2009)
- Senior Open Championship (2003-2009)
- Presidents Cup (2000, 2003, 2005, 2007)
- World Challenge (1999-2002)
- Bob Hope Classic (1995-1998)

== History ==
In the past, TNT owned cable rights to the (British) Open Championship, as well as the Women's British Open and Senior British Open, from 2003 to 2009 (with ABC picking up weekend coverage), replacing (and ultimately being replaced by) ESPN. TNT carried the first two rounds of the PGA Championship through 2019, with Turner having covered the event since 1991, at first on TBS and later TNT. TNT also carried the biennial PGA Tour-managed Presidents Cup from 2000 to 2007; Golf Channel assumed those rights beginning with the 2009 event as part of its overall deal for PGA Tour cable rights. TNT also broadcast the first two rounds of the Target World Challenge from 1999 to 2002, and the first three rounds of the five-round Bob Hope Chrysler Classic from 1995 to 1998, along with other select events.

Beginning in 2004, TNT as well as CBS, began broadcasting the PGA Championship in HDTV, although some cameras used SD widescreen through 2006. Meanwhile, the Open Championship was shown in widescreen SD from 2004 through the end of TNT's run in 2009 (weekend rights-holder ABC was forced to do the same, as only SD widescreen cameras were used by the home BBC broadcast). The 2007 Presidents Cup was mostly in HD, with a handful of SD widescreen cameras also being used (this was the standard setup of weekend rights-holder NBC at the time).

On October 10, 2018, it was announced that ESPN would replace TNT as the PGA Championship's cable partner beginning in 2020, with CBS remaining broadcast television rightsholder. This deal left TNT without any golf coverage.

=== Scheduled time for Turner coverage by year ===
British Open

- 2003-2004: 19 - When TNT took over the cable package for the British Open in 2003, they started providing 2 hours of early morning coverage on both weekend days prior to the start of ABC's air-time.
- 2005-2006: 20
- 2007-2009: 19

PGA Championship

- 1991-1996: 16 - When TBS took over the cable package for the PGA Championship in 1991, they increased the weekday coverage to 6 hours per day. TBS also added 2 hours of Saturday and Sunday coverage.
- 1997: 17
- 1998: 17
- 1999-2005: 17
- 2006-2009: 18
- 2010: 19
- 2011-2013: 18 - Because inclement weather stopped play during the third round of 2012 PGA Championship on Saturday, TNT added coverage starting at 8 a.m. ET on Sunday.

=== The Match ===
In May 2020, following the COVID-19 pandemic, TNT gained the rights to “Capital One’s The Match 2: Tiger Woods and Peyton Manning vs. Phil Mickelson and Tom Brady”. The event took place May 24 at the Medalist Golf Club in Hobe Sound, Florida. The regular TNT golf team from the 2019 PGA covered the event, in addition to NBA on TNT analyst Charles Barkley and PGA Tour player Justin Thomas.

TNT had previously produced coverage of the original “The Match” event between Woods and Mickelson in 2018, however that aired only on pay-per-view. Like the original, “The Match 2” featured all players mic’d up, and also provided earpieces to allow the players, from their custom-designed golf carts, to chat with the members of the broadcast booth (including Barkley) who were in the 18th tower.

The telecast, which was delayed slightly by rain, peaked at 6.3 million viewers, and averaged 5.8 million for the afternoon. The 3pm EDT Sunday broadcast was the highest rated and most watched golf event ever to air on a cable channel, meaning the telecast beat every Thursday and Friday round in PGA Tour history including TNT's own coverage of the British Open, PGA Championship, and Presidents Cup.

Since then, every edition of The Match has been aired on cable television by TNT, select editions have also been simulcast on TBS, TruTV or HLN. Since 2022, The Match has also been distributed internationally via Eurosport, GolfTV, and Discovery+, all of which are owned by TNT Sports' parent company.

==== The Match USA Viewership ====
Date	Title	USA TV	Average USA viewership	Source
November 28, 2018	The Match: Tiger vs. Phil	Pay-per-view; B/R Live	Unknown	
May 24, 2020	The Match: Champions for Charity	TNT; TBS; TruTV; HLN	5,800,000	
November 27, 2020	The Match: Champions For Change	TNT	1,000,000	
July 6, 2021	The Match IV	TNT; TBS; TruTV	1,700,000	
November 26, 2021	The Match: Bryson vs. Brooks	TNT; TBS; TruTV; HLN	1,200,000	
June 1, 2022	The Match VI	TNT; TruTV; HLN	1,500,000	
December 10, 2022	The Match VII	TNT; TBS; TruTV; HLN	1,400,000	
June 29, 2023	The Match VIII	TNT; TruTV; HLN	773,000	
February 26, 2024	The Match IX	TNT; TruTV; HLN	511,000	

=== Capital One MLB Open ===
In 2025, TNT will air taped coverage of the Capital One MLB Open. The tournament will be played November 12 to November 14, 2025, with coverage airing on TNT on November 18, 2025. The tournament will feature sixty current and former MLB players, including Jimmy Rollins, Tarik Skubal, John Smoltz, Justin Turner and David Wright. PGA Tour Productions and MLB Network will produce the coverage. Coverage of the tournament will be the first non-Match golf to air on TNT Sports since PGA Championship coverage ended in 2019.

== Commentators ==
=== Hosts/reporters ===
- Brian Anderson (2019–present)
- Amanda Balionis (2016–present)
- Charles Barkley (2020–present)
- Gary Bender (1992)
- Vince Cellini (2012-2015)
- Pat Haden (1991)
- Jim Huber (2000-2011)
- Ernie Johnson Jr. (1995-2018, 2022–present)
- Verne Lundquist (1995-1997, 2006 and 2011, fill-in)
- Bob Neal (1991-1994)
- Mike Tirico (2006, fill-in)
- Craig Sager (1991-1999)
- Don Sutton (1992)
- Matt Winer

=== Analysts ===
- Mary Bryan (1995-1996)
- Ian Baker-Finch (2007-2019)
- Donna Caponi (1991)
- Bobby Clampett (1991, 1996-2007)
- Billy Kratzert (2009-2019)
- Trevor Immelman (2017–present)
- David Leadbetter (1991-1994)
- Dave Marr (1995)
- Don Sutton

Preceded by ESPN	The Open Championship American cable television broadcaster 2003-2009	Succeeded by ESPN

Preceded by ESPN	PGA Championship cable television broadcaster 1991 (on TBS through 1998)-2019	Succeeded by ESPN
