= NFL on TNT =

- Former logo used from 1993 to 1997
- Also known as: TNT Sunday Night Football
- Genre: American football game telecasts
- Presented by: Fred Hickman; Bob Neal; Vince Cellini
- Starring: Skip Caray; Gary Bender; Verne Lundquist; Pat Haden; Mark May; Craig Sager; Bryan Burwell
- Country of origin: United States
- Original language: English
- No. of seasons: 8 (through 1997 season)

Production
- Production locations: Various NFL stadiums (game telecasts)
- Camera setup: Multi-camera
- Running time: 210 minutes or until game ends (inc. adverts)
- Production companies: National Football League; TBS Sports

Original release
- Network: TNT
- Release: September 9, 1990 – October 26, 1997

Related
- ESPN Sunday Night Football; NFL on CBS

The NFL on TNT is a series of National Football League (NFL) broadcasts on Sundays produced by Turner Sports for TNT between 1990 and 1997.

TNT aired NFL games on Sunday nights from September 9, 1990 to October 26, 1997 and served as one of the NFL's two cable television partners during that time. TNT carried games during the first half of the NFL season, while ESPN aired games during the second half of the season. In deference to the World Series, the game that fell the same weekend as that series would instead be played on Thursday night.

== History ==
=== Sunday night games (1990–1997) ===
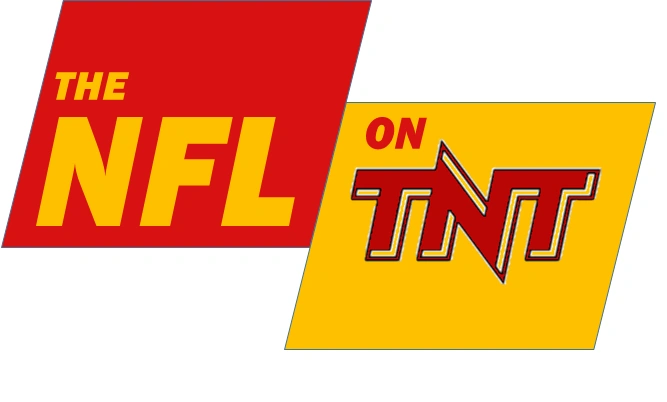
Former logo used from 1990 to 1992

TNT's contract with the NFL coincided with the expansion of the NFL's Sunday night scheduling to encompass the entire season, as opposed to the occasional matchups the NFL scheduled beginning in 1987. The contract in force at the time split the Sunday night telecasts between TNT and ESPN, who had originally had the rights to the Sunday night slate of games when they were limited to late season matchups. TNT carried Sunday night games for the first half of the NFL season, with ESPN taking over afterwards. TNT would also air any Thursday night NFL matchups that were scheduled during the first half of the season, with ESPN taking any in the second half. During this period, Major League Baseball (MLB) would typically hold Game 2 of the World Series on a Sunday night, and in deference the NFL would schedule TNT's game that weekend for Thursday instead.

As has always been the case for cable NFL broadcasts, TNT did not have exclusive rights to the broadcasts. As such, any game airing on TNT was simulcast on regular over-the-air television stations in each participating team's local market so that households without cable television could still see the telecasts. In the Atlanta area, any TNT game involving the Falcons was simulcast on co-owned WTBS channel 17, which was the local version of TBS.

ESPN anchor Chris Berman referred to TNT's football programming by its original "Nitro" brand, even after TNT abandoned that moniker. (This is not to be confused with the professional wrestling show called WCW Monday Nitro.)

It does not appear that TNT's coverage ever used the title Sunday Night Football, and indeed ESPN filed for a trademark on that title in 1996 (the trademark was later assigned to the NFL, allowing for its eventual use by NBC).

The last game was aired on October 26, 1997. Notably, one of the teams involved was the Atlanta Falcons, based in the home city of Turner Broadcasting, Atlanta. Unlike the Braves, Hawks and Thrashers, however, Ted Turner never owned the Falcons at any point in time (due to NFL ownership rules of the time).

=== Studio shows ===
TNT originally aired a one-hour studio pregame show, titled The Stadium Show, from 1990 to 1994. In 1995, this was reduced to a half-hour and retitled Pro Football Tonight, running through 1997. Fred Hickman was one of the studio hosts during this time, and Mark May was one of the studio analysts before moving to the booth for the final season.

==== Super Bowl Television ====
In addition to the Sunday night games, TNT also presented an annual special, Super Bowl Television. The program, which aired on Friday and Saturday night, mixed a preview of that season's game with entertainment segments. Ernie Johnson hosted the show from the Super Bowl host city.

=== The end of TNT's coverage ===
TNT lost their rights to the NFL following the 1997 season after ESPN chose to bid on the entire regular season package beginning in 1998. In the wake of the loss of NFL rights, TNT began negotiations with NBC Sports to start a new football league; TNT eventually backed out of the proposal. (NBC's proposed league eventually became the XFL.) TNT would not air professional football again until signing on as a broadcast partner with the Alliance of American Football (AAF) in 2019.

== Personalities ==
=== In the booth ===
==== Play-by-play ====
- Skip Caray (1990–1991)
- Gary Bender (1992–1994)
- Verne Lundquist (1995–1997)

==== Color commentary ====
- Pat Haden (1990–1997)
- Mark May (1997)

==== Sideline reporters ====
- Craig Sager (1990–1997)
- Bryan Burwell (1997)

=== Studio ===
==== Hosts ====
- Fred Hickman (1990–1992)
- Bob Neal (1993–1994)
- Vince Cellini (1995–1997)

==== Analysts ====
- Larry King (1990)
- Kevin Kiley (1990–1994)
- Lawrence Taylor (1994)
- Mark May (1995–1996)
- Warren Moon (1995)
- Randall Cunningham (1996)
- Keith Jackson (1997)
- Sean Jones (1997)

Records
Preceded by ESPN (2nd half of season only); 1987–1989	NFL Sunday Night Football broadcaster (1st half of season); 1990–1997; With: ESPN (2nd half of season)	Succeeded by ESPN (entire season); 1998–2005
