= Bryan Burwell =

American sportswriter and author

Bryan Ellis Burwell
- Born: August 4, 1955; Washington, D.C., U.S.
- Died: December 4, 2014 (aged 59); St. Louis, Missouri, U.S.
- Education: Virginia State University (1977)
- Occupations: Sportswriter, Commentator, Author
- Spouse: Dawnn Turner
- Children: Victoria Burwell
- Awards: APSE Top 10 Sports Columnist

Bryan Ellis Burwell (August 4, 1955 – December 4, 2014) was an American sportswriter and author. He joined the St. Louis Post Dispatch in 2002, after leaving HBO's Inside the NFL, where he worked as a sports correspondent. Burwell also worked in radio as a co-host on CBS Sports 920 in St. Louis, Missouri, on weekday afternoons and as on-air talent at 101 ESPN Radio, also in St. Louis. Burwell was featured on two ESPN programs, Jim Rome is Burning and The Sports Reporters.

Burwell co-wrote and hosted a documentary on the baseball's Negro leagues titled, The Color of Change. He recounted, in the documentary, the trials and tribulations of the baseball league built by racism and its ultimate demise. The documentary featured interviews with Buck O'Neil, Jackie Joyner-Kersee and Hall of Famer Ozzie Smith for the St. Louis Post Dispatch.

Burwell died at the age of 59 on December 4, 2014, from melanoma, a type of cancer, leaving behind a wife, Dawnn and daughter, Victoria. Burwell was a native of Washington D.C., but raised in Lanham, Maryland. He attended Duval High School and is a 1977 graduate of Virginia State University where he pledged Kappa Alpha Psi fraternity.

== Awards and recognition ==
- 2007 Associated Press Sports Editors named Burwell as one of the Top 10 sports columnists
- 2013 Eppy Award in recognition of his video-series Upon Further Review
- 2015 Burwell was posthumously elected to the U.S. Basketball Writers Association Hall of Fame, Burwell was the first African-American to be inducted into the organization's Hall of Fame.
- 2015 NABJ Legacy Award in recognition for having had a career of extraordinary achievement, which broke barriers and blazed trails

== Bibliography ==
- At the Buzzer! Havlicek Steals, Erving Soars, Magic Deals, Michael Scores!, Doubleday, 2001
- Busch Stadium: The First Season, By Joe Strauss, Rick Hummel, Bryan Burwell, etal., St.Louis Post-Dispatch, 2006
- The Best St. Louis Sports Arguments: The 100 Most Controversial, Debatable Questions for Die-Hard Fans, Sourcebooks, 2007
- Madden: A Biography, Triumph Books, 2011
