= Terry Gannon =

American sportscaster for golf, gymnastics, and figure skating

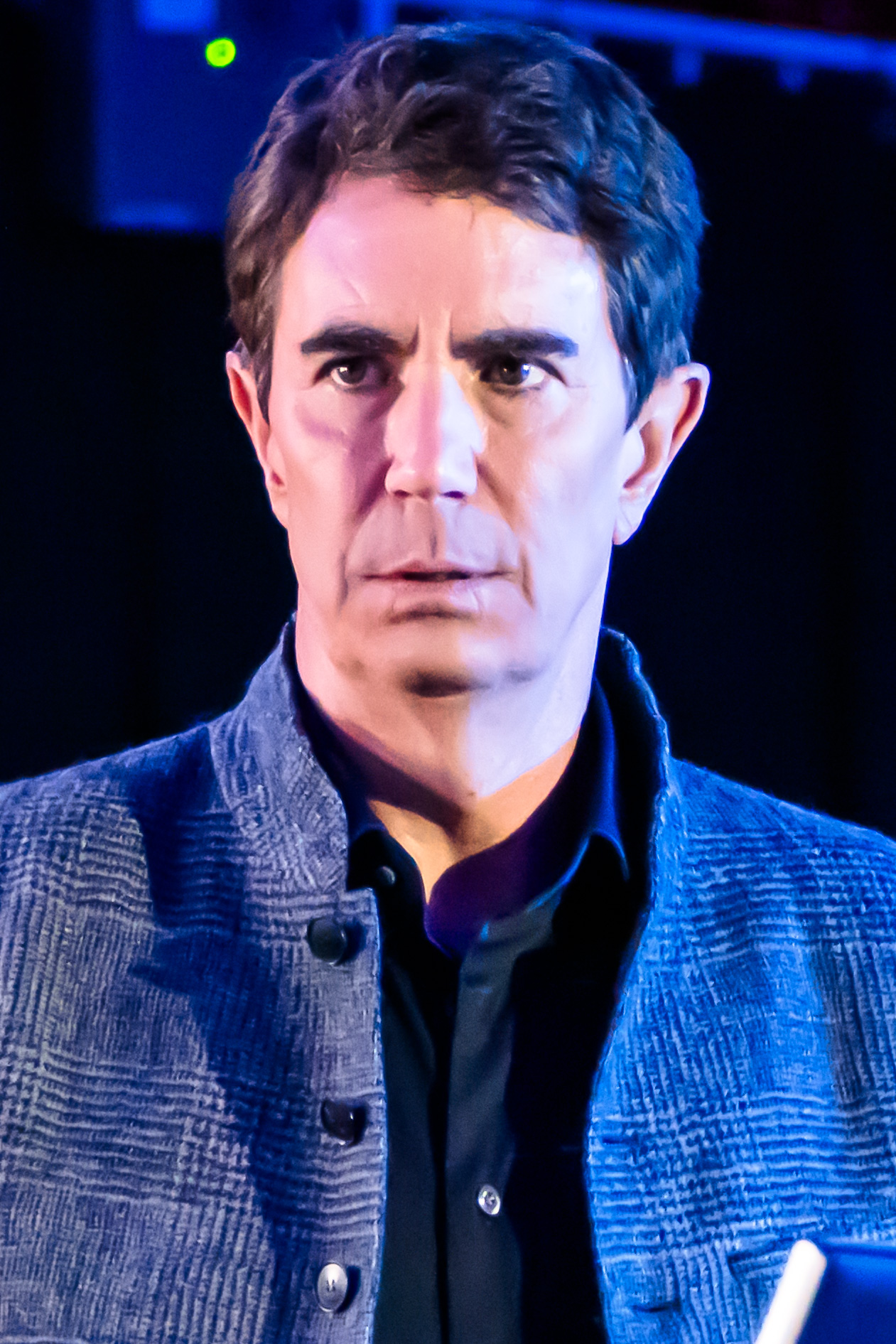
- Gannon at 2025 Skate America
- Born: Terrance Patrick Gannon; November 1, 1963 (age 62); Joliet, Illinois, U.S.
- Citizenship: American
- Education: North Carolina State University
- Occupation: Sportscaster
- Employer: NBC Sports
- Spouse: Lisa Gannon
- Children: 2

Terrance Patrick Gannon (born November 1, 1963) is an American sportscaster who is a play-by-play broadcaster for NBC Sports, Golf Channel and Peacock, calling primarily for golf, gymnastics and figure skating, as well as basketball for the Big Ten Conference and National Basketball Association.

Gannon played basketball for North Carolina State University, and under coach Jim Valvano, he was a member of the 1983 Wolfpack "Cardiac Pack" national championship-winning team. He was recognized as an Academic All-American twice, was NC State's all-time leading free throw shooter in 1983, and was ranked the second all-time Wolfpack player in career free throw accuracy.

Gannon began his early broadcasting career announcing for a variety of sports, mostly on cable outlets. In 1991, he began working for ABC; in the early 1990s, he started announcing for figure skating. In 2010, he began working for the Golf Channel; by 2016, he had become the lead play-by-play announcer for figure skating at NBC. In 2018, he began calling gymnastics and was a commentator for the sport during the 2020 Summer Olympics in Tokyo.

== Early life and career ==
Gannon was born and raised in Joliet, Illinois, to Jim Gannon and Mary Gann. Upon his father's recommendation, he took four years of tap dancing lessons from his mother, who had taught tap dancing for 30 years, because he thought it would be good for his son's coordination. Gannon began his basketball career at Joliet Catholic High School, where his father was a coach.

Gannon attended North Carolina State University (NC State) in Raleigh, North Carolina, where he played college basketball as part of the Wolfpack team under coach Jim Valvano. While at State, Gannon was recognized as an Academic All-American twice and NC State's all-time leading free throw shooter. In 1983, he was a part of the "Cardiac Pack", which upset the Houston Cougars for the NCAA title. He hit 85.4 percent of his free throw attempts and was ranked the second all-time Wolfpack player in career free throw accuracy.

After graduating with a degree in history from NC State in 1985, he worked as a graduate assistant for Valvano for a year, intending to become a basketball coach. He briefly played professional basketball in Europe, but on the advice of Valvano, left the sport for broadcasting. In 2018, on the 35th anniversary of their win, NC State inducted the entire 1983 men's basketball team into its Athletic Hall of Fame.

As of 2026, Gannon and his wife, Lisa Gannon, live in Los Angeles. They have two children.

== Broadcasting career ==
Gannon has announced a wide variety of sporting events and has been called one of the "most versatile" announcers in TV sports and "the man who knows every game". Fellow commentators Tara Lipinski, Johnny Weir, and Nastia Liukin credit Gannon with their development as analysts. Lipinski stated that Gannon's depth of knowledge, experience, and "the way he brings natural, genuine conversation into the booth" made his style "compelling". Gannon's focus as a commentator for the Olympics was exposing general fans to sports they viewed rarely, only every four years.

=== Early career ===
In 1986, Gannon began broadcasting on Valvano's TV and radio shows for regionally televised basketball games. He served as a regular college basketball game analyst for Raycom Sports, Prime Network, Jefferson-Pilot Sports, Sports South, and Home Team Sports between 1987 and 1994, and as a play-by-play announcer for Prime Sports and Jefferson-Pilot's coverage of college baseball. Gannon credits Valvano for his career, noting that the coach had told his players that basketball "shouldn't be your entire life, it shouldn't consume you". From 1990 to 1994, Gannon was the announcer for the Charlotte Knights, a Minor League Baseball team in Charlotte.

=== ABC and ESPN ===
In 1991, Gannon started working for ABC as a commentator for college basketball. He also was an announcer on the weekly show Wide World of Sports. While working at Wide World of Sports, Gannon said that his biggest broadcasting influences were Harry Caray and Al Michaels.

Starting in the early 1990s, after being asked to travel to Tokyo, Japan, to cover a professional figure skating event, Gannon served as host for ABC's figure skating coverage, teaming with former Olympic skaters Peggy Fleming and Dick Button at most major competitions. As sports reporter Barry Jacobs stated, figure skating was "a sport he had not followed", but like every new sport, he approached it with "scholarly zeal" and "as if it was a history project". He would learn a sport's rules, key figures from its past and present, and for the purpose of sounding authentic to its fans, its "idiosyncratic language". Gannon told reporter Barry Wilner that he would also talk about what he knew about the new sport and avoid unfamiliar topics until he learned more about it. Eventually, although he was most closely associated with figure skating and golf, with what Jacobs called "his warm, authoritative voice and understated manner", Gannon has announced for a wide variety of sporting events.

In 1993, Gannon began broadcasting for ESPN and ABC (which was merged with ESPN), covering play-by-play coverage for college basketball and football; by 2001, he had covered three post-season bowl games. He was an announcer on ABC's coverage of the PGA Tour and the Champions Tour and announced the Tour de France, which Jacobs called Gannon's "perhaps his greatest challenge", three times. In 2001, ABC reported that Gannon hosted the Belmont Stakes once and three times called the play-by-play at the Little League World Series. By the time he left ABC, Gannon had also covered the NBA, WNBA, horse racing, tennis, beach volleyball, skiing, supercross motorcycle racing, mountain biking, and golf. He announced for the 2002 FIFA World Cup, the 2003 FIFA Women's World Cup, WTA professional tennis, the 2004 Indianapolis 500, 2006 Belmont Stakes, the Special Olympics, the Goodwill Games, and hosted ABC's college football studio show. For six years, he hosted the Tournament of Roses Parade.

In 2018, Gannon told sports reporter Helen Ross that, among all the sports he has called, golf was the hardest, even though he had played it and had been a fan since childhood. He played golf in clubs near his home in Los Angeles, but most of his golf was played on the road, with former golf pros and fellow broadcasters like his Golf Channel broadcast partner, six-time major champion Nick Faldo, as well as with Craig Perks, Billy Kratzert, Matt Gogel, Jim Gallagher Jr., and Curt Byrum.

=== NBC Sports ===
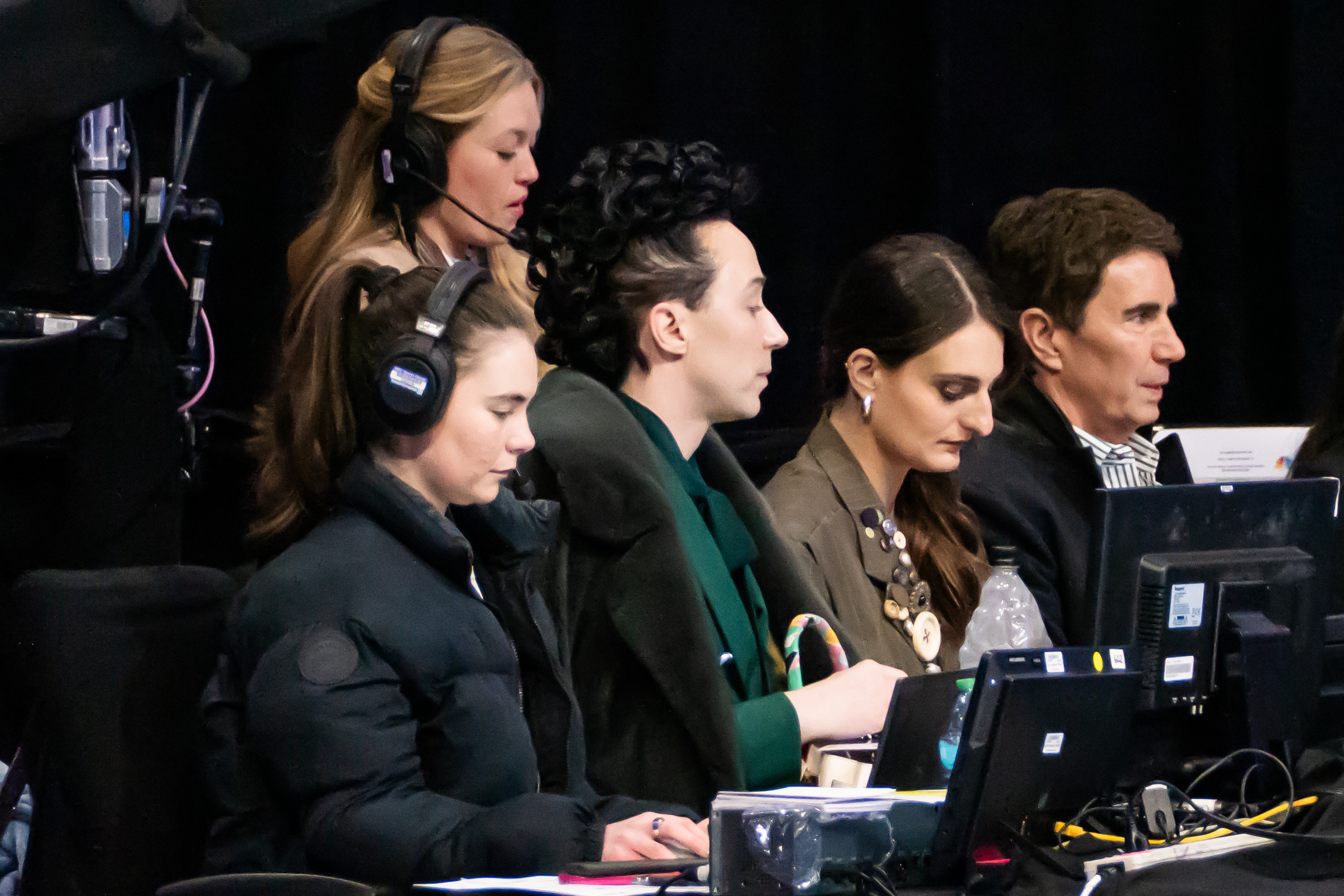
Gannon (far right) working at the NBC media table at the 2025 World Figure Skating Championships

In 2010, Gannon joined the broadcast team of the Golf Channel, which was owned by the NBC Sports Group. NBC Sports also called him one of its "most versatile voices". He served as play-by-play announcer on the PGA Tour, the LPGA Tour, Olympic figure skating and gymnastics, and college basketball. He has covered five Olympic Games, including serving as studio host and play-by-play commentator for figure skating, short track, rowing, canoeing, and golf. He won a Sports Emmy for his involvement in NBC's coverage of the 2024 Paris Olympics.

In 2014, Gannon was enlisted as a play-by-play commentator for figure skating as the needed backup announcers for their daytime broadcasts of figure skating, and so at first, he was slotted to work with 1998 Olympic champion Tara Lipinski and three-time U.S. national champion Johnny Weir separately. The trio recognized their chemistry and requested that they call the competition together; the result was the 10 best weekday daytime ratings in NBC's history. They were promoted to the network's lead figure skating announcing team the following season. Lipinski and Weir reported that Gannon "upped his game" with his wardrobe after working with them. Lipinski called Gannon "dapper" and "stylish"; she and Weir reported that she and Weir had helped Gannon with accessories such as cuff links and Hermès pocket squares. In 2017, Gannon signed a five-year contract extension with NBC and the Golf Channel.

In 2018, Gannon, Lipinski, and Weir announced figure skating at the Winter Olympics in PyeongChang, South Korea. Gannon also called ice dancing with former ice dancer Tanith White. Also in 2018, Gannon began commentating for gymnastics, with 1984 gold medalist Tim Daggett and 2008 all-around champion Nastia Liukin. Gannon said that he considered calling gymnastics at a high level "an honor". He was the play-by-play commentator for the 2024 Paris Olympics, along with Samantha Peszek and Tim Daggett.

Gannon, Lipinski, and Weir also hosted the closing ceremonies of four Olympic games: Pyeongchang (2018), Tokyo (2020), Beijing (2022), and Paris (2024).

Coinciding with the return of the NBA to NBC's broadcasting schedule, the network added Gannon to their broadcast team prior to the 2025–26 season, joining both Mike Tirico and Noah Eagle as play-by-play announcers. Since 2023, Gannon has called Big Ten basketball games for Peacock.

Gannon, with American tennis player Mary Carillo and American snowboarder Shaun White, were chosen to host the 2026 Winter Olympics Opening Ceremony. Carillo replaced Savannah Guthrie, whose mother disappeared six days prior to the opening ceremony.

== Career timeline ==
=== Assignments timeline ===
Year	Title	Role	Network
1991–1994	College Basketball on ABC/ESPN	Game analyst	ABC/ESPN
1995–2009	College Basketball on ABC/ESPN	Play-by-play	ABC/ESPN
1992–2010	Figure Skating on ABC/ESPN	Play-by-play (lead)	ABC/ESPN
1995–1998	Wide World of Sports	Play-by-play (secondary)	ABC/ESPN
1995–2009	College Football on ABC	Play-by-play (secondary)	ABC/ESPN
1999–2013	Golf on ESPN (PGA Tour on ABC)	Tower announcer/host	ABC/ESPN
2004–2012	WNBA on ESPN	Play-by-play (lead)	ABC/ESPN
2010–present	Figure Skating on NBC	Play-by-play (lead)	NBC
2010–2013	NBA on ESPN	Play-by-play (secondary)	ABC/ESPN
2010–present	Golf Channel	Tower announcer/host	Golf Channel
2013–present	Golf on NBC	Substitute host	NBC
2023–present	Gymnastics on NBC	Play-by-play (lead)	NBC
2023–present	College Basketball on NBC (Big Ten Basketball on Peacock)	Play-by-play (secondary)	NBC
2025–present	NBA on NBC	Play-by-play (secondary)	NBC
2026–present	The Masters	Host	Prime Video

- 1987–1994: college basketball analyst for Raycom Sports and Jefferson-Pilot Sports
- 1990–1994: announcer for the class AAA baseball team the Charlotte Knights
- 1991–1994: play-by-play announcer for Jefferson-Pilot's coverage of college baseball

=== Major events ===
- 1995–1997 Tour de France, ABC studio host
- 1995–1996 Little League World Series, ABC
- 1999 Little League World Series, ABC
- 2002 FIFA World Cup, ABC studio host
- 2003 FIFA Women's World Cup, ABC studio host
- 2004 Indianapolis 500, ABC studio host
- 2006 Belmont Stakes, ABC studio host
- 2010 Winter Olympics, Universal Sports daytime host
- 2012 Summer Olympics, NBC commentator, rowing and canoeing
- 2014 Winter Olympics, NBC commentator, figure skating and short track speed skating
- 2016 Summer Olympics, NBC main tower host, golf
- 2018 Winter Olympics, NBC commentator, figure skating (including ice dancing), closing ceremony
- 2020 Summer Olympics (2021), NBC commentator, gymnastics, closing ceremony
- 2022 Winter Olympics, NBC commentator, figure skating (including ice dancing), closing ceremony

Preceded by Brent Musburger	Lead Play-by-Play, Little League World Series; 1999	Succeeded by Brent Musburger
