= Golf on ESPN =

- Genre: American golf telecasts
- Presented by: Various commentators
- Country of origin: United States
- Original language: English
- No. of seasons: 48

Production
- Production location: Various tournament sites
- Camera setup: Multi-camera
- Running time: 210 minutes or until tournament ends (inc. adverts)
- Production company: ESPN

Original release
- Network: ESPN
- Release: September 8, 1979 – present
- Network: ABC
- Release: September 2, 2006 – November 18, 2018
- Release: December 7, 2023 – present

Related
- Golf on ABC

Golf coverage on ESPN has been a regular feature of the cable sports channel's programming since soon after ESPN's launch in the United States on September 7, 1979.

ESPN broadcast the LPGA Tour from 1979 through 2009, the Senior PGA Tour from 1982 through 2000, and the PGA Tour from 1984 through 2006. Since 2022, ESPN+ has been the home of PGA Tour Live, the tour's streaming broadcast.

ESPN is the cable rightsholder for two of the men's majors - the Masters Tournament (since 2008) and the PGA Championship (since 2020). In both cases, the telecasts are produced in association with CBS Sports (which serves as the U.S. broadcast television rightsholder for both tournaments) and have incorporated talent from the network's own golf telecasts.

== Coverage history ==
=== 1970s ===
Golf aired on the second day of ESPN on September 8, 1979, with coverage of the LPGA Tour. ESPN aired the LPGA through 2009, when it lost rights to the Golf Channel. Over the years, ESPN televised three LPGA major championships.

=== 1980s ===
Golf coverage greatly expanded on ESPN in the 1980s. In 1982, the Senior PGA Tour began airing on ESPN, which would air regular season action through 2000. In November 1983, ESPN signed a contract with the PGA Tour and would carry the tour through 2006. In 1982, innovative cable coverage of the major championships began, as ESPN aired three of men's golf's four majors for many years, the most distinctive feature being Thursday and Friday afternoon "Happy Hour" themed U.S. Open coverage anchored by Chris Berman.

=== 1990s ===
From 1991 through 2006, ESPN aired the PGA Tour Championship in conjunction with ABC, a fact depicted in the 1996 smash hit golf film Happy Gilmore. In 1999, ESPN began airing the World Golf Championships. From 1996 through 2006, ESPN aired The Players Championship, a flagship event of the PGA Tour. ESPN broadcast the 1994 Presidents Cup, 1996 Presidents Cup and 1998 Presidents Cup. When ABC became the primary rights holder for the PGA Tour in 1999, several new events were broadcast on ESPN for the first time as all ABC tournaments initially shared coverage with ESPN.

=== 2000s ===
Prior to 2007, ESPN and ABC shared some announcers, but the main ABC coverage team did not generally work on ESPN except for events that ABC had weekend rights to, in which case the full ABC team would work on ESPN's weekday telecasts. After losing PGA Tour rights to the Golf Channel following the 2006 season, what remained of ESPN and ABC's coverage team's merged, as did the production, with all ABC R&A broadcasts being branded as ESPN broadcasts as part of ESPN on ABC. History of the ESPN golf team during the period when some telecasts were still shown on ABC (2007–2009) can be found at the Golf on ABC article.

Since 2008, ESPN has carried early-round coverage of the Masters Tournament. This coverage is co-produced by CBS Sports as part of its presentation of the event, and largely features its personalities, joined by an ESPN studio host (initially Mike Tirico before his departure for NBC, and later Scott Van Pelt).

=== 2010s ===
In 2010, all ABC coverage was moved to ESPN, with highlight presentations being shown on ABC during the afternoons on Open Championship weekend. This meant that in 2010, for regular men's golf, ESPN showed The Masters, the U.S. Open, the Open Championship, and the Ryder Cup.

ESPN revamped its coverage team in 2010 as well. Mike Tirico and Paul Azinger remained the lead booth announcers. Curtis Strange returned as a hole announcer, while Scott Van Pelt moved from the studio host position to become a hole announcer as well. Sean McDonough joined the coverage team as another hole announcer. Andy North, Judy Rankin and Billy Kratzert all returned as on-course reporters. Terry Gannon moved from a hole announcer role to the role of studio host during live coverage, for highlight updates. Tom Weiskopf, who had been a hole announcer, became an analyst for holes Van Pelt was assigned to, and was joined by Peter Alliss in this role for one hour per day at the Open Championship. At the Ryder Cup, Alliss took Van Pelt's place as a hole announcer, while Van Pelt and Weiskopf worked on the studio set. Tom Rinaldi remained the lead interviewer and essayist.

In 2011, Olin Browne joined as an additional on-course reporter. Alliss began to only appear as a guest at the Open Championship, still for one hour per day, and still working as Van Pelt's analyst. In 2012, Gannon's role was eliminated and he joined NBC Sports and the Golf Channel.

2012 would also be ESPN's final Ryder Cup. The network traded its Friday rights to the 2014 event back to NBC for additional Premier League highlights. NBC then signed a rights deal covering the 2016–2030 editions of the event, ending ESPN's chances of a comeback.

Several changes occurred in 2013. Dottie Pepper replaced Browne as an on-course reporter. Weiskopf was moved to a position in which he would appear once during the telecast to discuss the architecture of the course and how it would affect play, as he is a noted course designer. Alliss also had his guest role cut to only Thursday and Friday coverage of the Open Championship. However, his role as an analyst for holes Van Pelt is assigned to is unchanged for those days.

In 2015, Weiskopf left to be a studio analyst for Fox Sports' coverage of USGA tournaments.

From 2008 to 2014, guest analysts were used during the Open Championship, in various roles, usually for a few hours each day scheduled around their own play in the event. Tom Watson fulfilled this role from 2008 to 2010 and David Duval performed this duty from 2011 through 2014.

The 2015 Open Championship was the final event covered by the core ESPN/ABC announcer team in place since the 1990s, nine years after first losing rights to the PGA Tour. After 2016, ESPN lost rights to the Open Championship to the Golf Channel and NBC. The LPGA's CME Group Tour Championship aired on ABC with ESPN announcers from 2015 through 2018.

In 2016, ESPN's 30 for 30 film series aired the film Hit it Hard about golfer John Daly.

=== 2020s ===
In October 2018, it was announced that early-round and weekend morning coverage of the PGA Championship would move from TNT to ESPN beginning 2020, with ESPN+ holding rights to stream supplemental coverage prior to ESPN's broadcast window, and during CBS weekend windows. As with the Masters, the coverage is co-produced by CBS Sports with the involvement of personalities from both networks.

In 2020, ESPN+ reached an agreement with the PGA Tour for the exclusive rights to PGA Tour Live, the tour's subscription video service, beginning in 2022. ESPN+ has access to more than 4,000 hours of live golf from 36 tournaments.

For the 2022 PGA Championship, ESPN announced that it would air a secondary broadcast modeled after its Monday Night Football with Peyton and Eli broadcasts for Monday Night Football, which will feature ESPN's new lead NFL commentator Joe Buck (in his first on-air appearance at ESPN after leaving Fox—where he had also briefly served as a golf commentator), ESPN golf analyst Michael Collins, and various celebrity guests (such as Buck's NFL partner Troy Aikman, Fred Couples, Ken Griffey Jr., J. J. Watt, and Peyton and Eli Manning—who will produce the broadcast, among others). It will serve as the opening hour of ESPN's coverage for each round of the tournament, after which it will air on ESPN2 (first and second rounds) or ESPN+ (third and final rounds).

In 2022, 30 for 30 aired the film Shark about Greg Norman's epic collapse at the 1996 Masters Tournament.

In 2023, ESPN announced an agreement to broadcast TGL, a virtual golf league in partnership with the PGA Tour. Originally scheduled to begin in January 2024, the inaugural season was delayed to January 2025 due to construction issues at the host venue in Palm Beach Gardens, Florida. TGL broadcasts feature Scott Van Pelt as host from his SportsCenter studio in Washington, with the exception of the 2025 SoFi Cup Finals, where he hosted it and SportsCenter on-site at SoFi Center in Palm Beach Gardens, Matt Barrie calling the play, with Marty Smith conducting sideline reports, and analysis from Roberto Castro. For the league's second season, one match aired on ABC.

On December 7–10, 2023, ABC and ESPN aired the inaugural World Champions Cup. The tournament featured three teams; Team International, Team Europe and Team USA. It was the first golf coverage to air on ABC since 2018.

On May 17, 2024, ESPN was praised for their breaking news coverage of Scottie Scheffler's arrest at the 2024 PGA Championship.

In August 2024, ESPN+ announced it would begin airing coverage of the Western Amateur Golf Championship.

After Brooks Koepka announced he would return to the 2026 PGA Tour from LIV Golf, ESPN announced that it would simulcast the "Main Feed" from PGA Tour Live, which usually airs only on ESPN+, for the first and second round of the Farmers Insurance Open. The coverage marked the first time since 2006 that ESPN would air the PGA Tour live on its linear network. ESPN later announced that it would also simulcast PGA Tour Live for select FedExCup Playoff events, which will allow the linear network to carry two hours of weekday morning coverage of the St. Jude Championship, BMW Championship and the Tour Championship in 2026.

== Tournaments ==
=== Current ===
- The Masters, first two rounds (2008–present)
- PGA Championship, first two rounds and early weekend coverage (1982–1990, 2020–present)
- PGA Tour Live: Live coverage of 35 tournaments on ESPN+ (2022–present)
  - Weekday morning coverage of the Farmers Insurance Open on ESPN, Hulu and Disney+ (2026)
  - Weekday morning coverage of the St. Jude Championship on ESPN (2026)
  - Weekday morning coverage of the BMW Championship on ESPN (2026)
  - Weekday morning coverage of the Tour Championship on ESPN (2026)
- Amateur events
  - Asia-Pacific Amateur Championship, all four rounds (2013–present)
  - Latin America Amateur Championship, all four rounds (2015–present)
  - Western Amateur, Sweet 16 through Championship (2024–present)
- Team events
  - World Champions Cup, all four rounds (2023, 2025–present)
- TGL, all matches on ABC (since 2025), ESPN, ESPN2 or ESPN+ (2024–present)

=== Former ===
- PGA Tour
  - Regular season events from 1984–2006
  - U.S. Open, first two rounds (1982–2014)
  - The Open Championship, first two rounds (1982–2002), all four rounds (2010–2015)
  - World Golf Championships (1999–2006)
  - The Players Championship (2003–2006)
  - Tour Championship (1991–2006)
- LPGA
  - Regular season events from 1979–2009
  - Kraft Nabisco Championship, first two rounds (1983–2005), first three rounds (2006–2010)
  - U.S. Women's Open, first two rounds (1982–2014)
  - Women's British Open, first two rounds (1982–2002), all four rounds (2010–2015)
  - CME Group Tour Championship, final round (aired on ABC) (2015–2018)
- Champions Tour
  - Regular season events from 1982–2000
  - The Tradition, first two rounds (1998–2002)
  - Senior PGA Championship, first two rounds (1997–2005)
  - U.S. Senior Open, first two rounds (1986–2014)
  - Senior Players Championship, first two rounds (1999–2002)
  - Senior Open Championship, first two rounds (1982–2002), all four rounds (2010–2015)
  - Senior Tour Championship (1997–2000)
- Ryder Cup (2008, 2010 and 2012)
- Presidents Cup (1994, 1996 and 1998)

== Announcers ==
Scott Van Pelt is currently the lead golf host for ESPN. Former world number one golfer David Duval and hall of famer Curtis Strange are the lead analysts.

Records
| Preceded by USA | Masters Tournament cable television broadcaster 2008–present | Succeeded by Incumbent |
| Preceded by None; TNT | PGA Championship cable television broadcaster 1982–1990; 2020–present | Succeeded by TNT; Incumbent |
| Preceded by ABC | The Open Championship American television broadcaster 2010–2015 | Succeeded by NBC |
| Preceded by None | U.S. Open cable television broadcaster 1982–2014 | Succeeded by Fox Sports 1 |
