= Frank Chirkinian =

Television producer (1926–2011)

Frank Chirkinian (June 3, 1926 – March 4, 2011) was an American television sports producer and director. He is most notable for his work on golf coverage though he also directed coverage of the Winter Olympics, the United States Open Tennis Championships, college and professional American football, auto racing, and the Triple Crown of Thoroughbred Racing.

== Early life ==
Chirkinian was born in Philadelphia, Pennsylvania. He was of Armenian descent.

== Career ==
Chirkinian was known as the "father of televised golf" for the impact he had on golf broadcasting. He came to the attention of CBS after he impressed with his direction of the 1958 PGA Championship. Recruited by the network, who had no one with expertise in the relatively new field of golf broadcasting, he went on to be executive producer of CBS's golf coverage from 1959 until 1996. During his time at CBS, he was nicknamed "The Ayatollah" for his brusque, uncompromising approach to directing broadcasts. Chirkinian was particularly well regarded for the coverage of the Masters Tournament that he oversaw for four decades, working closely with the authorities at Augusta National to ensure they were satisfied.

Chirkinian was responsible for a number of innovations in the filming and presentation of golf. He made sure that as many microphones as possible were placed around the golf course to pick up the sounds of the tournament and golfers' conversations, rather than having commentators talk over silent footage. He showed as many golf shots as possible, cutting quickly from player to player to keep up the pace of the broadcast, unafraid of focusing on the game's stars. The use of multiple cameras was introduced during Chirkinian's tenure, including high-angle cameras mounted in trees and on blimps for the first time.

Chirkinian said that he was most proud of being the first to display golfers' scores relative to par, rather than cumulatively, making it simpler to work out how they were faring relative to the rest of the field. Most of all, Chirkinian thought it important to allow coverage to focus on golfers and the shots they made, and was critical of recent innovations in golf broadcasting that he saw as distracting and unnecessary.

== Death and legacy ==
He died at his Florida home after suffering from lung cancer.

Shortly before his death, Chirkinian was elected to the World Golf Hall of Fame; he was inducted posthumously. At the induction ceremony, a message Chirkinian videotaped shortly before his death was broadcast to the assembled golfing luminaries.

== In popular culture ==
- Chirkinian appeared as himself in the Kevin Costner film Tin Cup.

== Awards and honors ==
- Chirkinian won four Emmy Awards during his career.
- He also won two Peabody Awards.
- In 2007, Chirkinian was awarded the Sports Lifetime Achievement Award and inducted into the Sports Broadcasting Hall of Fame.
- In 2011, he was elected and inducted into the World Golf Hall of Fame.
