= List of PGA Tour on CBS commentators =

This is a list of PGA Tour on CBS commentators throughout the years. The list includes both past, and present CBS commentators covering PGA tour events.

== Current announcers ==
- Jim Nantz (1986–present), Lead host
- Trevor Immelman (2020–present), Lead Analyst
- Frank Nobilo (2015–present), 16th hole analyst
- Colt Knost (2021–present), hole analyst
- Dottie Pepper (2016–present), lead on-course reporter
- Mark Immelman (2016–present), on-course reporter
- Johnson Wagner (2026–present), on-course reporter
- Amanda Balionis (2017–present), reporter / interviewer
- Andrew Catalon (2019–present), Alternate 18th hole host

== Former ==
- Ian Baker-Finch (2007–2025)
- Gary Bender (1981–1984)
- Tim Brando
- Bruce Bryant
- Clive Clark (1982–1985)
- Bobby Clampett (1992–2006)
- Ben Crenshaw (1996–1997)
- John Derr (1956–1972)
- Ben Wright (1973–1996)
- Jack Drees
- Dick Enberg (2000–2005)
- Nick Faldo (2007–2022)
- David Feherty (1997–2015)
- Frank Gifford (1969)
- Frank Glieber (1968–1985)
- Bobby Jones
- Jim Kelly
- Peter Kostis (1992–2019)
- Henry Longhurst (1968–1976)
- Davis Love III (2020)
- Verne Lundquist (1983–1996; 1999–2024)
- Bill Macatee (1995–2020)
- Bill MacPhail
- Gary McCord (1986–2019)
- Sean McDonough (1996–1999)
- Jim McKay (1956–1961)
- Steve Melnyk (1982–1991)
- Cary Middlecoff (1968–1969)
- Brent Musburger (1983–1988)
- Bob Murphy (1984–1991)
- Jim Nelford (1995)
- Byron Nelson (1968)
- Merlin Olsen
- Peter Oosterhuis (1997–2014)
- Bud Palmer
- Jerry Pate (1996–1998)
- Billy Joe Patton
- Jay Randolph (1968)
- Clifford Roberts
- Chris Schenkel (1958–1965)
- Ray Scott (1969-1974)
- Vin Scully (1975–1982)
- Pat Summerall (1968–1994)
- Jim Thacker
- Ken Venturi (1967–2002)
- Lanny Wadkins (2002–2006)
- Tom Weiskopf (1985–1995)
- Jack Whitaker (1961–1981)
