= Bob Neal (Atlanta sportscaster) =

American sportscaster

- Born: November 14, 1942 (age 83); Morristown, Tennessee U.S.
- Occupation: Sportscaster
- Years active: 1977–present
- Spouse: Sally Neal
- Children: 2, including (Dave)

Bob Neal (born November 14, 1942) is an American sportscaster.

== Career ==
Bob Neal has been involved for forty-two years in television and radio at the national and local level. He currently teaches sports journalism at the University of Georgia and Georgia State University and is the anchor of the syndicated "Play To Win" NFL and college football show, which is independently produced. Neal has also been a familiar voice for Turner Sports on its national NBA coverage for TNT and TBS for telecasts for 23 years.

The Chicago-bred broadcaster's experience includes play-by-play for both the NBA and NCAA college football games on NBC. At TNT and TBS, Neal has been the broadcast voice for PGA Tour events, NFL football, Atlanta Braves, Atlanta Hawks and World Cup soccer. Previously, Neal was the radio voice of the NFL Atlanta Falcons (1975–81, 1995–97) and news and sports director of WXIA-TV in Atlanta.

From 2008 to 2013, Neal was the anchor of the shows Talkin' Football, Talkin' Hoops, "SportsNite", and offered play-by-play for college football, basketball and baseball for Comcast Sports Network, a division of NBC Sports Group.

In addition to his current hosting of Play To Win, his studio hosting experience also includes the award-winning Football Saturday on TBS, the 1986 and 1990 Goodwill Games, and TNT's Sunday night NFL broadcasts. Neal's long-tenured association with Turner Sports began in 1977, producing and hosting Sports Week on TBS, the first national sports show on cable.

=== Accolades ===
Neal's accolades include five Georgia Area Emmys, three Associated Press Awards and a share of five national Emmys for his role in Goodwill Games telecasts. Neal is also the recipient of two Cable ACE Awards for SEC Football and NBA Coverage as well as the Masters Water Ski Tournament for Turner Sports. Neal is the 2012 recipient of the Lindsey Nelson Award, in recognition of career contributions to broadcasting, presented by the National Football Foundation. Most recently, Neal was honored as Distinguished Journalism Alumni by Northern Illinois University and has been inducted into The Silver Circle of The National Academy of Television Arts and Sciences (NATAS). Neal is a member of the Board of Governors of NATAS Southeast.

== Personal ==
Neal studied at Northern Illinois University and the University of Michigan and holds a BA degree in journalism from NIU. Neal is currently married to his wife Sally and has two sons, Dave Neal and Rob.
