= Golf on ABC =

- Former logo used from 2000 to 2003
- Genre: American golf telecasts
- Presented by: Various commentators
- Country of origin: United States
- Original language: English
- No. of seasons: 59

Production
- Production location: Various tournament sites
- Camera setup: Multi-camera
- Running time: 210 minutes or until tournament ends (inc. adverts)
- Production companies: ABC Sports (1962–2006); ESPN (2006–present)

Original release
- Network: ABC
- Release: July 12, 1962 – November 18, 2018
- Release: December 7, 2023 – present

Related
- Golf on ESPN

Golf coverage on ABC has been a regular feature of the television sports channel's programming since 1962.

ABC broadcast at least one PGA Tour event from 1962 to 2009, focusing before 1995 on the majors, with ABC serving as the primary television partner of the PGA Tour from 1999 until 2006.

From July 12, 1962 to July 19, 2009, ABC served as the American broadcast home of The Open Championship. The British Open on ABC was the longest-running entertainment program in ABC's history and the last-surviving ABC program to debut in the "circle a" era. ABC also held the broadcast rights of the US Open from 1966 through 1994. and the PGA Championship from 1965 until 1990.

Golf has returned to ABC in recent years with coverage of the final round of the CME Group Tour Championship on the LPGA Tour from 2015 to 2018, coverage of the World Champions Cup in 2023, and coverage of TMRW Golf League in 2025.

== Coverage history ==
=== 1960s ===
ABC broadcast golf events for the first time on July 12, 1962, when it began televising the Open Championship as part of its anthology series Wide World of Sports. The network later gained the broadcast rights to the PGA Championship in 1965, and the U.S. Open in 1966. Chris Schenkel and Byron Nelson were the initial hosts of the tournament coverage.

=== 1970s ===
In 1975, Jim McKay and Dave Marr became the lead broadcast team, while Bob Rosburg joined the network as the first ever on-course reporter, and Peter Alliss joined as a co-anchor.

=== 1980s ===
Beginning in 1982, ABC adopted its most well-known format of the Wide World of Sports era. The broadcast operated using anchor teams, in which an anchor and an analyst called all of the action from the tower at the 18th hole, and the teams rotated on coverage after about a half-hour. Meanwhile, the three on-course reporters (Judy Rankin, Ed Sneed, and Rosburg) were utilized when prompted by the anchor team. McKay and Marr were the lead team, with Jack Whitaker and Alliss as the second team. Occasionally, Rosburg or Whitaker hosted if McKay was unavailable, while Roger Twibell took over the secondary team. After his 1986 Masters win, Jack Nicklaus appeared on ABC after the end of his round and served as an analyst for the rest of the telecast.

=== 1990s ===
In 1990, Roger Twibell took over as lead anchor, with Dave Marr as his analyst. Peter Alliss became sole anchor of the second anchor team. During this period, ABC acquired the rights to several non-major PGA Tour events, mostly important events such as the Memorial Tournament and The Tour Championship. 1990 would also mark the final PGA Championship to be broadcast by ABC.

In 1992, Brent Musburger, who had been heavily criticized for his hosting of golf coverage while with CBS, took over as host. Marr was dismissed from the network, while Twibell was reassigned to ESPN's golf coverage, although he occasionally hosted on ABC for a few lower-level tournaments. The format was also reorganized to more emphasize the on-course reporters. Steve Melnyk moved over from CBS to become lead analyst; however, Alliss would anchor for stretches during the telecast. Beyond the team in the booth, all of ABC's other voices were on the course, including Rankin, Rosburg and newcomer Mark Rolfing.

In 1993, ABC used Peter Jacobsen as lead analyst; however, Jacobsen returned to playing in 1994 and Melnyk returned to the lead analyst position. ABC continued to hold the television rights to select PGA Tour events, with the schedule increasing slightly as a result of a new television deal with the PGA Tour in 1995, however it still mostly emphasized only the important tournament events. The network lost the rights to the U.S. Open following an ugly split from the United States Golf Association (USGA) in 1994. Nicklaus held his position of entering the booth during the major championship telecasts through the period from 1990 to 1996.

After facing much criticism for its golf coverage, especially Nicklaus' involvement and Musburger's perceived lack of knowledge of the game, ABC decided to completely overhaul its visual presentation, becoming more in line with cable partner ESPN, while changing the format for its coverage to be more of the standard in line with the other networks, featuring a lead anchor team, announcers assigned to individual holes, and on-course reporters. Mike Tirico became the host, with Curtis Strange serving as lead analyst. Steve Melnyk, Peter Alliss and Ian Baker-Finch became hole announcers, while Bob Rosburg, Judy Rankin and Rolfing were the primary on-course reporters.

ABC continued its renewed commitment to golf when it reached a new television contract in 1999 in which the network gained the broadcast rights to many events, including the entire fall PGA Tour season and two of the new World Golf Championships events. ABC partnered with ESPN on much of its coverage, with ESPN carrying the early rounds of tournament events that ABC broadcast, in addition to those that were part of the cable channel's own schedule; the ABC team would work the cable telecasts in these cases.

To compensate the extra telecasts, ABC added several members to its broadcasting team. Rolfing left to return to NBC and was replaced by Billy Ray Brown. Gary Smith and Mark McCumber (who had worked for the network part-time in 1998) also joined as on-course reporters. Strange and Tirico worked every event, however the other members of the on-air broadcast team generally took weeks off, appearing on certain events.

=== 2000s ===
McCumber left ABC after 1999, followed by Smith after 2002; Rosburg began to drastically cut his schedule in 2003. Melnyk became an on-course reporter for the 2003 Tour broadcasts, replacing Smith. Brandel Chamblee replaced Melnyk as a hole announcer. In 2002, ABC renewed its contract with the PGA Tour through 2006, maintaining a similar tournament broadcast schedule.

Bob Rosburg retired after 2003, while Brandel Chamblee left the network. Melnyk briefly moved to a role as an on-course reporter in early 2004 before retiring. Ian Baker-Finch and Peter Alliss remained hole announcers in 2004, while ESPN's Andy North joined Brown and Rankin as an on-course reporter.

Strange left ABC Sports in June 2004 due to a contract dispute, and was replaced as lead analyst for the rest of the season mostly by Baker-Finch, who also served as lead analyst for ESPN during this time. For the rest of the season, ABC had several active PGA players substitute as analysts alongside Baker-Finch, including Hal Sutton and Fred Couples. Nick Faldo worked The Open Championship and caught the eye of ABC producers. It was announced before the 2004 Tour Championship that Faldo and Paul Azinger would become the lead analysts for the network's tour coverage starting at the 2004 Tour Championship. The two, whose pairing was met with wide praise and acclaim by critics, had formerly been playing rivals and had gone head-to-head in both The Open Championship and the Ryder Cup.

With Faldo and Azinger on board, Baker-Finch was moved back to being a hole announcer. The rest of the team remained intact, with the addition of Terry Gannon as an occasional host or hole announcer. In the spring of 2006, Judy Rankin was diagnosed with breast cancer, resulting in ESPN's Billy Kratzert replacing her as an on-course reporter while she sought treatment.

In early 2006, it was announced that both ESPN and ABC would lose their respective television rights to the PGA Tour after that season. Mike Tirico was given the position as lead announcer for Monday Night Football; he left the golf team following the Deutsche Bank Championship in September. Gannon took over as lead host for the remainder of ABC's final season. Coinciding with the network's coverage of the Deutsche Bank event, ABC Sports was rebranded as ESPN on ABC as part of the cable channel's increased oversight of the network's sports division, with ESPN graphics being used on the ABC telecasts.

ABC's final PGA Tour-sanctioned event was the unofficial Target World Challenge, hosted by Tiger Woods. Rankin returned from her medical leave and Bob Rosburg came out of retirement to work as on-course reporters for the final telecast.

In 2007, ESPN and ABC covered just the first two rounds of the US Open and the final two rounds of the Open Championship. Ian Baker-Finch and Nick Faldo both moved to CBS, while Billy Ray Brown moved to the Golf Channel. Andy North, Billy Kratzert and a fully healthy Judy Rankin became the on-course reporters for both ESPN and ABC. For the ABC telecasts of the Open, the 2006 booth team made a special return, including CBS's Faldo. Alliss and Terry Gannon served as hole announcers for the telecast.

In 2008, ESPN reorganized its golf coverage, obtaining the broadcast rights to The Masters; all tournament coverage on both ESPN and ABC was identical, with the exception of the Masters telecasts, which were produced by CBS. Additionally, ABC telecasts did not use the experimental top-screen scoring banner that was used on ESPN's telecasts used in 2008 and 2009. Nick Faldo did not return as an announcer and was not replaced; Mike Tirico and Paul Azinger became the lead booth announcers. Curtis Strange returned to the network, joining Gannon and Tom Weiskopf as a hole announcer. North, Rankin and Kratzert remained on-course reporters; Alliss became an analyst for holes that Gannon was assigned to.

ABC's final live telecast was the 2009 Open Championship, in which Tom Watson nearly won the championship at the age of 59. Watson had worked for ABC as a guest analyst at the previous year's Open and had been scheduled to do so again.

=== 2010s ===
ESPN moved all live golf coverage to cable in 2010, with ABC being relegated to carrying a three-hour encore presentation of the day's Open Championship rounds starting at 3:00 p.m. Eastern Time through 2015.

ESPN and ABC lost Open Championship rights to Golf Channel/NBC after the 2015 event. ESPN or ABC had aired the event every year since 1962. Later in December 2015, ESPN returned live golf to ABC with the announcement that the final round of the CME Group Tour Championship on the LPGA Tour would be broadcast on the network. A scaled down version of the ESPN/ABC crew worked the event. ABC broadcast this event until 2018, as NBC took over their coverage the following year.

=== 2020s ===
On November 12, 2020, Sports Business Journal reported that the conclusion of the final round of the Masters on Sunday, November 15 could be broadcast on ABC, if weather or a playoff extended the action beyond 4 p.m., when CBS would transition to NFL coverage. The tournament ultimately aired in full on CBS.

On December 7–10, 2023, ABC and ESPN aired the inaugural World Champions Cup. The tournament featured three teams; Team International, Team Europe and Team USA. It was the first Golf coverage to air on ABC since 2018.

On December 28, 2025, the opening match of TMRW Golf League, between Atlanta Drive GC and New York GC, aired on ABC.

== Tournaments ==
- Tournament of Champions (1972–1978, 1988–1998)
- Hawaiian Open (1972–1978, 1996–1998)
- Bob Hope Classic (1999–2002, 2004–2006)
- Tucson Open (1997–1998)
- Los Angeles Open (1975–1978, 2003–2006)
- San Diego Open (1972–1973)
- Pebble Beach Pro-Am (1973–1978)
- The Players Championship (1974–1978)
- WGC Match Play (1999–2006)
- Houston Open (1987–1998, 2002)
- Atlanta Classic (1975)
- Byron Nelson Classic (1972–1978, 1988–1998)
- Colonial National Invitation (1972–1973)
- Compaq Classic of New Orleans (1999–2002)
- Memorial Tournament (1988–1998)
- U.S. Open (1966–1994)
- St. Jude Classic (1999–2003)
- Booz Allen Classic (2003–2006)
- Buick Championship (2000-2002, 2006)
- Buick Classic (1999–2006)
- Western Open (1987–1988, 1999–2006)
- John Deere Classic (2004–2006)
- The Open Championship (1962–2009)
- Greater Milwaukee Open (1989–2006)
- American Golf Classic (1972–1976)
- PGA Championship (1965–1990)
- Deutsche Bank Championship (2003–2006)
- Michelob Championship (1999–2000)
- WGC Championship (1999–2006)
- Walt Disney World Golf Classic (1999–2006)
- Las Vegas Invitational (2002–2006)
- Southern Open (2001–2002)
- Chrysler Championship (2003–2006)
- Chrysler Championship of Greensboro (2003–2006)
- Tour Championship (1991–2006)
- Senior Open Championship (2003–2009)
- Women's British Open (LPGA, 2001–2009)
- Senior PGA Championship (1997–2005)
- Kraft Nabisco Championship (LPGA, 1991–2005)
- The Tradition (1997–2002)
- Senior Players Championship (1997–2002)
- Skins Game (1991–2008)
- Wendy's Champions Skins Game (1997–2005)
- Legends of Golf (1997–2004)
- Hyundai Team Matches (1999–2002)
- World Challenge (2001–2006)
- WGC World Cup (2003–2006)
- Wendy's 3-Tour Challenge (1998–2009)
- ADT Golf Skills Challenge (2005)
- Monday Night Golf (1999–2005)

== Controversies ==
On November 1, 1997, during the third round of the 1997 Tour Championship, ABC employees staged a one-day boycott after an employee was disciplined for drawing an obscene cartoon of Walt Disney Company chairman Michael Eisner (Disney had purchased ABC two years prior). ABC showed final round coverage of the 1996 Tour Championship in the broadcast window.

In 2004, ABC cut away from the final round of the Buick Classic PGA Tour golf tournament at 7:00 p.m. Eastern and Central Time Zones to show a rerun of America's Funniest Home Videos. Three players were involved in a sudden-death shootout when ABC signed off from its coverage. The shootout round was seen on ABC stations on the West Coast until the end of the match.

== Monday Night Golf ==
From 1999 to 2005, ABC broadcast Monday Night Golf, a series of seven match play golf challenge events, each of which involved #1 ranked World Golfer Tiger Woods. It marked the first time that a live golf event had been shown in prime time during the week in the United States. Monday Night Golf proved to be an initial success, drawing more viewers than the final round of the U.S. Open, and being second only to the final round of the Masters Tournament in terms of golf broadcasts. Ratings increased significantly for the second match, but declined rapidly for subsequent matches, and the event was finally discontinued after the 2005 edition.

== ESPN in the picture ==
Following the 2009 British Open, ABC sister network ESPN obtained the exclusive U.S. television rights to The Open Championship. This marked the first time that one of the major golf championships would not be televised on one of the major U.S. broadcast television networks. ABC still aired a condensed highlight package of ESPN's coverage of the third and fourth rounds at 3:00 p.m. during the tournament's weekend rounds, titled The Open Championship Today. ABC also rebroadcast the final rounds of the Senior British Open Championship and Women's British Open. In 2015, The R&A agreed to a new broadcast deal with Golf Channel and NBC Sports, putting The Open Championship back on broadcast television.

== Theme music ==
Beginning in the mid-1970s, ABC Sports used Barry White's "Love's Theme" as the opening theme music for its live golf telecasts; this theme was finally retired midway through 1997 with the reorganization of ABC's golf coverage. A new generic sports theme was used through the broadcasts from 1997 to 1999; however, a distinct separate theme would close the broadcasts. From the WGC event at the end of 1999 through the 2003 season, another theme was introduced which was more authoritative and heroic in style than the previous theme. The closing music from 1997 was retained to close the broadcasts during this period. Additionally, the network's coverage of The Open Championship used its own distinct theme during this period.

From 2004 to 2006, a theme composed by Non-Stop Music was used for all events, including The Open Championship. ABC Sports was rebranded as ESPN on ABC, around the time of the 2006 Deutsche Bank Championship, with ABC's sports broadcasts being unified under ESPN's branding standardizations, including graphics and theme music. While ABC's golf coverage did use the ESPN graphics, the networks retained separate theme music through the end of the season (and ABC's contract).

In 2007, ABC's remaining golf telecasts began using the Bob Christianson-composed themes used for ESPN's tournament telecasts. In 2008 and 2009, a modified version of the ESPN golf theme was used for The Open Championship, with bagpipes playing the main melody. ABC's live coverage of golf ended after 2009, however the network's replays of weekend telecasts from ESPN use The R&A theme song composed by Non-Stop Music in 2010.

Records
Preceded by None	The Open Championship American television broadcaster 1962–2009	Succeeded by ESPN
Preceded by NBC	U.S. Open network television broadcaster 1966–1994	Succeeded by NBC
Preceded by CBS	PGA Championship network television broadcaster 1966–1990	Succeeded by CBS
