= 2009 Open Championship =

Coordinates: 55.316°N 4.832°W

- Front cover of the 2009 Open Annual

Tournament information
- Dates: 16–19 July 2009
- Location: Ayrshire, Scotland
- Course(s): Ailsa Course, Turnberry
- Organized by: The R&A
- Tour(s): European Tour; PGA Tour; Japan Golf Tour

Statistics
- Par: 70
- Length: 7,204 yards (6,587 m)
- Field: 156 players, 73 after cut
- Cut: 144 (+4)
- Prize fund: £4,200,000 €4,852,724 $6,837,628
- Winner's share: £750,000 €866,558 $1,221,005

Champion
- (United States) Stewart Cink
- 278 (−2), playoff

Location in Scotland
Location in South Ayrshire, Scotland

The 2009 Open Championship was a men's major golf championship and the 138th Open Championship, held from 16–19 July at the Ailsa Course of the Turnberry Resort, in Ayrshire, Scotland. Stewart Cink won his only major championship after a four-hole playoff with Tom Watson. At age 59, Watson had the chance to win his sixth Open and become the oldest major champion in history during regulation play, but was unable to par the final hole and tied with Cink.

It was the fourth Open at Turnberry; the previous winners were Watson (1977), Greg Norman (1986), and Nick Price (1994).

== Venue ==
As with previous editions of The Open Championship at Turnberry, this event was played on the resort's Ailsa Course. Since it last hosted the Championship in 1994, the course had been lengthened by almost 250 yards (230 m), with over 60 yards (55 m) having been added to the par 5 17th hole. Six new tees had been built, and the 16th hole was 45 yards (41 m) longer and had been remodelled into a dog-leg to the right, having previously been relatively straight.

=== Card of the course ===
Ailsa Course

Hole	Name	Yards	Par	Hole	Name	Yards	Par
1	Ailsa Craig	354	4	10	Dinna Fouter	456	4
2	Mak Siccar	428	4	11	Maidens	175	3
3	Blaw Wearie	489	4	12	Monument	451	4
4	Woe-Be-Tide	166	3	13	Tickly Tap	410	4
5	Fin Me Oot	474	4	14	Risk-An-Hope	448	4
6	Tappie Toorie	231	3	15	Ca' Canny	206	3
7	Roon The Ben	538	5	16	Wee Burn	455	4
8	Goat Fell	454	4	17	Lang Whang	559	5
9	Bruce's Castle	449	4	18	Duel in the Sun	461	4
Out		3,583	35	In		3,621	35
				Total		7,204	70

Previous lengths of the course for The Open Championship:

- 1994: 6,957 yards (6,361 m), par 70
- 1986: 6,957 yards (6,361 m), par 70
- 1977: 6,875 yards (6,286 m), par 70

== Field ==
Each year, around two-thirds of The Open Championship field consists of players that are fully exempt from qualifying for the Open. Below is a list of the exemption categories, and the players who were exempt for the 2009 Open. Each player is classified according to the first category by which they qualified, with other categories they also fall into being shown in parentheses. Some categories are not shown as all players in that category had already qualified from an earlier category:

1. First 10 and anyone tying for 10th place in the 2008 Open Championship
Robert Allenby (5,15), Stephen Ames (5), Paul Casey (5,6,7,19), Ben Curtis (3,4,5,15,19), Ernie Els (3,4,5,15), Jim Furyk (5,15,19), Pádraig Harrington (3,4,5,6,13,19), David Howell, Anthony Kim (5,15,19), Greg Norman (3), Ian Poulter (5,6,19), Henrik Stenson (5,6,14,19), Steve Stricker (5,15,19), Chris Wood

- Robert Karlsson (5,6,19) withdrew prior to the tournament due to an eye problem.

2. Past Open Champions born between 17 July 1943 and 19 July 1948
(Eligible but did not compete: Tony Jacklin, Johnny Miller)

3. Past Open Champions aged 60 or under on 19 July 2008
Mark Calcavecchia, John Daly, David Duval (4), Nick Faldo, Todd Hamilton (4), Paul Lawrie (4), Tom Lehman, Justin Leonard (5,15,19), Sandy Lyle, Mark O'Meara, Tom Watson, Tiger Woods (4,5,11,12,13)
(Eligible but did not compete: Ian Baker-Finch, Seve Ballesteros, Nick Price, Bill Rogers)

4. The Open Champions for 1999-2008

5. The first 50 players on the Official World Golf Rankings for Week 21, 2009
Ángel Cabrera (11,12), Chad Campbell (15,19), K. J. Choi (15), Stewart Cink (15,19), Tim Clark (15), Luke Donald, Gonzalo Fernández-Castaño, Ross Fisher (6), Sergio García (6,14,15,19), Retief Goosen (6), Miguel Ángel Jiménez (6,7,19), Dustin Johnson, Zach Johnson (12), Martin Kaymer (6), Søren Kjeldsen (6), Hunter Mahan (15,19), Graeme McDowell (6,19), Rory McIlroy, Geoff Ogilvy (11), Sean O'Hair, Kenny Perry (15,19), Álvaro Quirós (6), Justin Rose (19), Rory Sabbatini, Adam Scott, Vijay Singh (13,15), David Toms, Camilo Villegas (15), Nick Watney, Mike Weir (15), Lee Westwood (6,19), Oliver Wilson (6,19)

- Trevor Immelman (12,15) withdrew prior to the tournament due to a wrist injury.
- Phil Mickelson (12,13,14,15,19) withdrew prior to the tournament due to his wife's recovery from breast cancer surgery.
- Shingo Katayama (23,24) withdrew prior to the tournament due a back injury.
- Jeev Milkha Singh (6,20) withdrew prior to the tournament due a rib injury.

6. First 30 in the PGA European Tour Final Order of Merit for 2008
Darren Clarke, Richard Finch, Richard Green, Søren Hansen (19), Peter Hanson, Peter Hedblom, James Kingston, Pablo Larrazábal, Paul McGinley, Damien McGrane, Francesco Molinari, Colin Montgomerie, Charl Schwartzel, Anthony Wall

7. The BMW PGA Championship winners for 2007-2009
Anders Hansen

8. First 3 and anyone tying for 3rd place, not exempt having applied above, in the top 20 of the 2009 PGA European Tour Race to Dubai on completion of the 2009 BMW PGA Championship
Thongchai Jaidee, Louis Oosthuizen, Robert Rock

9. First 2 European Tour members and any European Tour members tying for 2nd place, not exempt, in a cumulative money list taken from all official PGA European Tour events from OWGR Week 19 up to and including the BMW International Open and including the U.S. Open
Nick Dougherty, Johan Edfors

10. The leading player, not exempt having applied above, in the first 5 and ties of each of the 2009 Open de France Alstom and the 2009 Barclays Scottish Open.

11. The U.S. Open Champions for 2005-2009
Michael Campbell, Lucas Glover

12. The U.S. Masters Champions for 2005-2009

13. The U.S. PGA Champions for 2004-2008

14. The U.S. PGA Tour Players Champions for 2007-2009

15. Top 30 on the Official 2008 PGA Tour FedEx Cup points list
Stuart Appleby, Briny Baird, Ken Duke, Ryuji Imada, Billy Mayfair, Carl Pettersson, Andrés Romero, Kevin Sutherland, D. J. Trahan, Bubba Watson

- Dudley Hart withdrew prior to the tournament.

16. First 3 and anyone tying for 3rd place, not exempt having applied above, in the top 20 of the FedEx Cup points list of the 2009 PGA Tour on completion of the HP Byron Nelson Championship
Brian Gay, Charley Hoffman, Charles Howell III

17. First 2 PGA Tour members and any PGA Tour members tying for 2nd place, not exempt, in a cumulative money list taken from The Players Championship and the five PGA Tour events leading up to and including the 2009 AT&T National
Paul Goydos, Bryce Molder

18. The leading player, not exempt having applied above, in the first 5 and ties of each of the 2009 AT&T National and the 2009 John Deere Classic
Brandt Snedeker

- Brett Quigley qualified at the John Deere Classic, but declined the invitation in order to attend the memorial service for the wife of fellow player Chris Smith

19. Playing members of the 2008 Ryder Cup teams
J. B. Holmes, Boo Weekley

20. First place on the 2008 Asian Tour Order of Merit

21. First place on the 2008 PGA Tour of Australasia Order of Merit
Mark Brown

22. First place on the 2008 Sunshine Tour Order of Merit
Richard Sterne

23. The 2008 Japan Open Champion

24. First 2, not exempt, on the Official Money List of the Japan Golf Tour for 2008
Prayad Marksaeng, Azuma Yano

25. The leading 4 players, not exempt, in the 2009 Mizuno Open Yomiuri Classic
Ryo Ishikawa, Tomohiro Kondo, Kenichi Kuboya, David Smail

26. First 2 and anyone tying for 2nd place, not exempt having applied (25) above, in a cumulative money list taken from all official 2009 Japan Golf Tour events up to and including the 2009 Mizuno Open Yomiuri Classic
Yuta Ikeda, Koumei Oda

27. The Senior British Open Champion for 2008
Bruce Vaughan

28. The 2009 Amateur Champion
Matteo Manassero (a)

29. The 2008 U.S. Amateur Champion
(U.S. Amateur winner Danny Lee turned professional in April 2009 and forfeited his automatic exemption.)

30. The 2008 European Individual Amateur Champion
Stephan Gross (a)

International Final Qualifying

Africa: Jaco Ahlers, Marc Cayeux, Jeremy Kavanagh
Australasia: Josh Geary, Tim Wood, Michael Wright
Asia: Gaganjeet Bhullar, Liang Wenchong, Terry Pilkadaris, Tim Stewart
America: James Driscoll, Freddie Jacobson, Richard S. Johnson, Matt Kuchar, Martin Laird, Davis Love III, Jeff Overton
- Tim Wilkinson withdrew prior to the tournament due to thumb surgery.
Europe: Paul Broadhurst, Rhys Davies, David Drysdale, Rafael Echenique, Oliver Fisher, Branden Grace, Raphaël Jacquelin, Gary Orr, Richie Ramsay, Graeme Storm

Local Final Qualifying (Monday 6 July and Tuesday 7 July)

Glasgow Golf Club - Gailes Links: Thomas Aiken, Peter Baker, David Higgins, Elliot Saltman
Kilmarnock (Barassie): Markus Brier, Peter Ellebye, Daniel Gaunt, Lloyd Saltman
Western Gailes: Fredrik Andersson Hed, Thomas Haylock, Steve Surry, Daniel Wardrop

Alternates
Drawn from the Official World Golf Rankings of 5 July 2009 (provide the player was entered in the Open and did not withdraw from qualifying):

1. Mathew Goggin replaced Trevor Immelman.
2. Ben Crane replaced Phil Mickelson.
3. Steve Marino replaced Shingo Katayama.
4. Rod Pampling entered the field as no players not already qualified finished in the top 5 at the Barclays Scottish Open.
5. Thomas Levet replaced Brett Quigley.
6. John Senden replaced Jeev Milkha Singh.

== Round summaries ==
=== First round ===
Thursday, 16 July 2009

Calm and sunny weather provided good scoring conditions for the opening round. Miguel Ángel Jiménez took the lead at 64 (−6), and past champions turned back the clock: five-time winner Tom Watson, age 59, carded a bogey-free 65, and both Mark Calcavecchia (1989, age 49) and Mark O'Meara (1998, 52) shot 67. Ben Curtis, 2003 champion, also opened with 65 to join Watson and Kenichi Kuboya, who was even par through 14 holes, but finished birdie, birdie, eagle, birdie. Steve Stricker, Stewart Cink, and Camilo Villegas started strong at 66, and notables at 67 included Calcavecchia, O'Meara, Retief Goosen, Jim Furyk, Mike Weir, and Vijay Singh. Two-time defending champion Pádraig Harrington had a quiet 69, while Tiger Woods struggled off the tee for 71. Two-time champion Greg Norman, the previous year's Cinderella story, had a disappointing 77.

Place	Player	Score	To par
1	(Spain) Miguel Ángel Jiménez	64	−6
T2	(United States) Ben Curtis	65	−5
T2	(Japan) Kenichi Kuboya	65	−5
T2	(United States) Tom Watson	65	−5
T5	(United States) Stewart Cink	66	−4
T5	(Australia) Mathew Goggin	66	−4
T5	(Australia) John Senden	66	−4
T5	(United States) Steve Stricker	66	−4
T5	(Colombia) Camilo Villegas	66	−4
T10	(United States) Mark Calcavecchia	67	−3
T10	(United States) Jim Furyk	67	−3
T10	(South Africa) Retief Goosen	67	−3
T10	(South Africa) Branden Grace	67	−3
T10	(South Africa) James Kingston	67	−3
T10	(United States) Steve Marino	67	−3
T10	(United States) Mark O'Meara	67	−3
T10	(Fiji) Vijay Singh	67	−3
T10	(South Africa) Richard Sterne	67	−3
T10	(United States) Boo Weekley	67	−3
T10	(Canada) Mike Weir	67	−3

=== Second round ===
Friday, 17 July 2009

High winds and scattered showers pushed the scoring average more than two strokes higher with just seven sub-par rounds on Friday, compared to fifty on Thursday. The conditions were the worst during the morning, and the round's best of 68 belonging to co-leader Steve Marino and Ross Fisher, tied for fourth place. Retief Goosen shot an even par 70 to share fourth. Veteran Tom Watson continued his excellent performance; he struggled through the front nine, but holed long putts at the 16th and 18th, as he made three birdies on the back nine to tie Marino for the lead at 135 (−5). Nearly sixty, Watson looked to become the oldest winner of a major championship by over a decade.

The cut was at 144 (+4) and 73 players advanced to the weekend. Sixteen-year-old British Amateur Champion Matteo Manassero played with Watson and posted 141 and all but secured the silver medal as the leading amateur. Among those to miss the cut was world number one and pre-tournament favorite Tiger Woods. Going out in the afternoon, his 74 included two double bogeys on holes 10 and 13, and his 145 missed the cut by a stroke. It was his first missed cut at the Open, and only the second missed cut in a major as a professional, after the 2006 U.S. Open. Other notables to miss the cut included Mike Weir (67–78=145), Ben Curtis (65–80=145), David Duval (71–76=147), and Geoff Ogilvy (75–78=153).

Place	Player	Score	To par
T1	(United States) Steve Marino	67-68=135	−5
T1	(United States) Tom Watson	65-70=135	−5
3	(United States) Mark Calcavecchia	67-69=136	−4
T4	(England) Ross Fisher	69-68=137	−3
T4	(South Africa) Retief Goosen	67-70=137	−3
T4	(Spain) Miguel Ángel Jiménez	64-73=137	−3
T4	(Japan) Kenichi Kuboya	65-72=137	−3
T4	(Fiji) Vijay Singh	67-70=137	−3
T9	(United States) Stewart Cink	66-72=138	−2
T9	(United States) J. B. Holmes	68-70=138	−2
T9	(Australia) Mathew Goggin	66-72=138	−2
T9	(South Africa) James Kingston	67-71=138	−2
T9	(England) Lee Westwood	68-70=138	−2

Amateurs: Manassero (+1), Gross (+9).

=== Third round ===
Saturday, 18 July 2009

Tom Watson continued his good form with a one-over 71 to maintain a one stroke lead. Mathew Goggin was one of only five players under par in conditions similar to Friday, and was just one stroke off the lead, tied for second with Ross Fisher. The best round of the day was 67 by Bryce Molder, who leapt into the top ten after starting the round in a tie for 53rd.

Place	Player	Score	To par
1	(United States) Tom Watson	65-70-71=206	−4
T2	(England) Ross Fisher	69-68-70=207	−3
T2	(Australia) Mathew Goggin	66-72-69=207	−3
T4	(South Africa) Retief Goosen	67-70-71=208	−2
T4	(England) Lee Westwood	68-70-70=208	−2
T6	(United States) Stewart Cink	66-72-71=209	−1
T6	(United States) Jim Furyk	67-72-70=209	−1
T8	(United States) Bryce Molder	70-73-67=210	E
T8	(Thailand) Thongchai Jaidee	69-72-69=210	E
T10	(Argentina) Ángel Cabrera	69-70-72=211	+1
T10	(Sweden) Richard S. Johnson	70-72-69=211	+1
T10	(United States) Steve Marino	67-68-76=211	+1
T10	(United States) Boo Weekley	67-72-72=211	+1

=== Final round ===
Sunday, 19 July 2009

Fisher birdied the first two holes to take the outright lead as Watson had two bogeys in three holes. Fisher had a three shot lead at one point, but dropped back with a bogey on the 4th hole and quadruple bogey 8 on the 5th hole, and was never in contention again. Matthew Goggin was in contention most of the day and was tied for the lead with 5 holes remaining, but 3 straight bogeys took him out of contention. Chris Wood was 4 under for the day through 17 holes and 2 under the tournament, just 1 stroke behind the lead. But he caught a flier from the rough on 18 and was unable to get up and down behind the green, dropping to 1 under. Lee Westwood eagled the 7th hole to move into the lead, which he held or shared for most of the round, but bogeys at three of the last four holes, including a three putt on 18, dropped him to 1 under, one stroke behind clubhouse leader Cink, who had rolled in a 15-foot (4.5 m) putt for birdie at the 18th to move to two-under.

Watson birdied the 17th to move into sole possession of the lead at 3 under par. Needing a par four at the 18th to win, his approach shot took a hard bounce and rolled well over the green. Watson was unable to get up and down and entered into a four-hole playoff with Cink for the Claret Jug.

Place	Player	Score	To par	Money (£)
T1	(United States) Stewart Cink	66-72-71-69=278	−2	Playoff
T1	(United States) Tom Watson	65-70-71-72=278	−2	Playoff
T3	(England) Lee Westwood	68-70-70-71=279	−1	255,000
T3	(England) Chris Wood	70-70-72-67=279	−1	255,000
T5	(England) Luke Donald	71-72-70-67=280	E	157,000
T5	(Australia) Mathew Goggin	66-72-69-73=280	E	157,000
T5	(South Africa) Retief Goosen	67-70-71-72=280	E	157,000
T8	(South Africa) Thomas Aiken	71-72-69-69=281	+1	90,400
T8	(South Africa) Ernie Els	69-72-72-68=281	+1	90,400
T8	(Denmark) Søren Hansen	68-72-74-67=281	+1	90,400
T8	(Sweden) Richard S. Johnson	70-72-69-70=281	+1	90,400
T8	(United States) Justin Leonard	70-70-73-68=281	+1	90,400

Amateurs: Manassero (+2)

==== Scorecard ====
Hole	1	2	3	4	5	6	7	8	9	10	11	12	13	14	15	16	17	18
Par	4	4	4	3	4	3	5	4	4	4	3	4	4	4	3	4	5	4
(United States) Cink	−1	−1	−1	−1	E	E	−1	−1	−1	E	−1	−1	−2	−1	−2	−1	−1	−2
(United States) Watson	−3	−3	−2	−2	−2	−2	−3	−3	−2	−2	−3	−3	−3	−2	−2	−2	−3	−2
(England) Westwood	−2	−2	−2	−2	−1	−2	−4	−4	−4	−3	−3	−3	−3	−3	−2	−1	−2	−1
(England) Wood	+2	+2	+2	+2	+2	+2	E	−1	−1	−2	−2	−2	−1	E	−1	−1	−2	−1
(England) Donald	+2	+2	+2	+1	+1	+1	+1	+2	+2	+1	+1	+1	+1	+2	+1	+1	E	E
(Australia) Goggin	−3	−2	−2	−1	−1	−1	−2	−2	−2	−3	−3	−3	−3	−2	−1	E	E	E
(South Africa) Goosen	−2	−1	−1	−1	−1	−1	−1	−1	−1	−1	−1	E	E	E	+2	+2	E	E
(England) Fisher	−4	−5	−5	−4	E	E	+1	+2	+2	+2	+2	+2	+2	+2	+2	+2	+2	+2

Cumulative tournament scores, relative to par

Eagle	Birdie	Bogey	Double bogey	Triple bogey+

=== Playoff ===
Watson and Cink had tied at 278 (−2) during regulation play and entered a playoff for the championship. Under the rules of the Open Championship, a four-hole aggregate playoff was played over hole numbers 5, 6, 17, and 18.

On the first extra hole, both players found greenside bunkers, but while Watson was only able to make minimal progress towards the hole and made bogey, Cink splashed out to six feet (1.8 m) and saved par. Both made par three on the second hole, but at the par 5 17th, Watson's drive went left to a bad lie in heavy rough, and he was unable to reach the fairway with his next shot. On the green in four, he three-putted for double bogey, while Cink hit the green in two and two-putted for birdie. With a four-stroke lead on the final hole, Cink hit his approach to five feet (1.5 m) and made birdie to triumph in the playoff by six strokes.

Place	Player	Score	To par	Money (£)
1	(United States) Stewart Cink	4-3-4-3=14	−2	750,000
2	(United States) Tom Watson	5-3-7-5=20	+4	450,000

- Four-hole aggregate playoff on holes 5, 6, 17, and 18

==== Scorecard ====
Playoff

Hole	5	6	17	18
Par	4	3	5	4
(United States) Cink	E	E	−1	−2
(United States) Watson	+1	+1	+3	+4

Cumulative playoff scores, relative to par
