= List of Ryder Cup broadcasters =

The Ryder Cup matches were always covered by the BBC, whether in Britain or in the United States, even prior to the British team's merger with Europe. In the 1990s, Sky Sports became heavily involved in the Ryder Cup, and has since taken over live coverage, including creating a channel specifically dedicated for the 2014 and 2016 competition. The BBC still screens edited highlights each night.

== UK television coverage ==
The Ryder Cup was always covered on TV and radio by the BBC from 1927 to 1971. But in the 1970s, ITV gained the rights to cover the Ryder Cup on TV covering the 1973, 1975 and 1977 cups. ITV was also supposed to show the 1979 cup (the first with a European team) but were stopped from showing it due to the 1979 ITV strike. The BBC continued to cover it on radio.

In 1981, the BBC regained the TV rights after an eight-year absence covering the 1981, 1983, 1985, 1987, 1989, 1991 and 1993 cups. But beginning in 1995, Sky Sports took over the rights for live coverage and has held them ever since.

Sky Sports created a dedicated channel for the competition beginning with the 2014 cup. It has created a dedicated channel for every cup since this is now a simple rebranding for Sky Sports Golf when the event takes place starting from the week before to the Monday after. But the BBC now has highlights on TV and is still doing live coverage on the radio having broadcast it on the radio since the first cup in 1927 but now has to share radio coverage with Talksport.

== US television coverage overview ==
=== ABC (1975–1987) ===
In the United States, the Ryder Cup was first televised live at the 1983 matches in Florida, with ABC Sports covering just the final four holes of the singles matches. A highlight package of the 1985 singles matches was produced by ESPN, but no live coverage aired from England. In 1987, with the matches back in the United States, ABC covered both weekend days, but only in the late afternoon. Also in 1987, ABC provided approximately 2½ hours of tournament coverage each on Saturday as well as Sunday. The network also previously covered the Sunday singles of the Ryder Cup in 1975 (with Jim McKay as the lead commentator) and 1979.

=== ESPN (1985–1987; 2006–2012) ===
ESPN revamped its graphics and its coverage team in 2010 as well. Mike Tirico and Paul Azinger remained the lead booth announcers. Curtis Strange returned as a hole announcer, while Scott Van Pelt moved from the studio host position to become a hole announcer as well. Sean McDonough joined the coverage team as another hole announcer. Andy North, Judy Rankin and Billy Kratzert all returned as on-course reporters. Terry Gannon moved from a hole announcer role to the role of studio host during live coverage, for highlight updates. Tom Weiskopf, who had been a hole announcer, became an analyst for holes Van Pelt was assigned to, and was joined by Peter Alliss in this role for one hour per day at the Open Championship. At the Ryder Cup, Alliss took Van Pelt's place as a hole announcer, while Van Pelt and Weiskopf worked on the studio set. Tom Rinaldi remained the lead interviewer and essayist.

In 2012, Gannon's role was eliminated and he joined NBC Sports and the Golf Channel.

2012 would also be ESPN's final Ryder Cup. The network traded its Friday rights to the 2014 event back to NBC for additional Premier League highlights. NBC then signed a rights deal covering the 2016–2030 editions of the event, ending ESPN's chances of a comeback.

=== USA Network (1989–2010) ===
In 1989, USA Network began a long association with the Ryder Cup, by televising all three days live from England, the first live coverage of a Ryder Cup from Europe. This led to a one-year deal for the 1991 matches in South Carolina to be carried by NBC live on the weekend, with USA Network continuing to provide live coverage of the first day. All five sessions were broadcast for the first time. The success of the 1991 matches led to a contract extension with USA and NBC through 1997, marking a turning point in the competition's popularity. For the European matches, the first two days were taped and aired on delay in the U.S. Another extension with USA and NBC covering the 1999–2003 (later moved to 2004) competitions increased the number of hours of coverage to include the entire first day and most of the second day. Tape delay was still employed for competitions from Europe.

In early 2006, it was announced that USA was outbid by Golf Channel for its early-round PGA Tour rights, with USA's final season being 2006. NBC/Universal, parent company of USA Network, traded away the network's Friday Ryder Cup coverage through 2012 to ESPN for the rights to sign Al Michaels. However, USA did renew its Masters contract for an additional year. USA would televise the 2007 Masters before being outbid by ESPN for future coverage. The 2007 Masters was also the final event for USA Sports, which was dissolved into parent NBC Sports after the tournament. All future sports telecasts on USA would use NBC's graphics and personalities.

The Ryder Cup contract, which stipulated cable coverage air on USA, was still controlled by NBC even after it granted ESPN the rights to Friday cable coverage (normally the only day of the event covered on cable). However, in 2010, rain on Friday pushed the singles matches to Monday, necessitating that they air on cable. With NBC having granted only Friday rights to ESPN, the singles matches aired on USA, which would be the final golf telecast for the network. Four months later, NBC merged with Golf Channel, making Golf Channel NBC's primary cable outlet for golf.

=== NBC (1991–present) ===
1993 was first the Ryder Cup played in Europe to be televised live in the United States by a major network, NBC. The 1989 edition was carried by the USA Network on cable, with video provided by the BBC. The U.S. television coverage in 1985 was a highlight show on ESPN in early November, over a month after its completion. NBC took over live weekend coverage in 1991 in South Carolina.

The Ryder Cup's increased success led to a landmark contract with NBC (which had recently bought USA Network) to air the 2006–2014 competitions on USA and NBC. It called for a record increase in coverage hours, with the second day now having near-complete coverage. Tape delay was last used for the 2006 event in Ireland. In 2006, ESPN was sub-licensed rights to Friday coverage, as part of a larger transaction between NBC and Disney that also resulted in ABC Sports personality Al Michaels moving to NBC to join their then-upcoming Sunday-night NFL games, ESPN gaining expanded access to highlights from events whose rights are owned by NBC, and Disney acquiring the rights to the cartoon character Oswald the Lucky Rabbit (who was created by Walt Disney in 1927 for a series of animated shorts distributed by Universal Pictures).

In 2013, NBC reached a deal to extend its rights to the Ryder Cup and Senior PGA Championship through 2030, with Friday coverage of the Ryder Cup being assumed by Golf Channel.

The 2016 Ryder Cup was televised in the United States by Golf Channel and NBC, which planned to provide 170 hours of coverage. In the United Kingdom and Ireland, the event was broadcast by Sky Sports; the broadcaster re-branded its Sky Sports 4 channel as Sky Sports Ryder Cup for the week of the event, and planned to broadcast 240 hours of coverage.

== US television commentators ==
=== Play-by-play/anchors ===
Announcer	Years	Network(s)
Dick Enberg	1995–1999	NBC
Chick Hearn	1959	NBC
Dan Hicks	2002–2018	NBC
Charlie Jones	1991	NBC
Jim Lampley	1993	NBC
Bill Macatee	1991–2006	USA
Jim McKay	1975, 1979, 1983, 1987	ABC
Jim Simpson	1989	USA
Mike Tirico	2008–present	ESPN; NBC

The 33rd Ryder Cup Matches were covered live in the United States for all five sessions. USA Network covered the Friday action, with Bill Macatee and Peter Kostis in the 18th tower. The weekend was covered live by NBC Sports, with Dick Enberg and Johnny Miller in the 18th tower, Dan Hicks calling holes, and on-course reporters Gary Koch, Mark Rolfing, Roger Maltbie, and John Schroeder. Jim Gray conducted interviews, and on the final day was also used as a fifth on-course reporter. On the weekend, former European Ryder Cup captain Bernard Gallacher was brought in as a guest analyst to provide a European perspective. In the UK, BBC and Sky Sports both had a presence, with Peter Alliss and Ewen Murray being the lead broadcaster for each.

In the United States, coverage of 2002's first day was presented on tape-delay by USA Network, but was recorded live. Bill Macatee and Peter Kostis hosted from the 18th tower. On the weekend, NBC Sports presented Saturday's coverage on tape, but recorded live. NBC aired the singles live on Sunday. Dan Hicks and Johnny Miller hosted from the 18th tower, Bob Murphy called holes, while on-course reporters were Gary Koch, Mark Rolfing, Roger Maltbie, and Ed Sneed. To provide a European perspective, NBC used former European team captain Bernard Gallacher and former European team player Nick Faldo as guest analysts. Gallacher had performed the same role for NBC at the previous Ryder Cup.

In the United States, live Friday 2004 coverage was provided by USA Network. Bill Macatee and Peter Kostis hosted from the 18th tower. NBC Sports presented live coverage of the Saturday and Sunday matches. Dan Hicks and Johnny Miller hosted from the 18th tower, Bob Murphy called holes, while on-course reporters were Gary Koch, Mark Rolfing, Roger Maltbie, and Ed Sneed.

In the United States, coverage of 2006's first day was recorded live, but presented on tape-delay by USA Network. Bill Macatee hosted from the 18th tower. On Saturday, NBC Sports presented coverage on tape, but recorded live. NBC then aired the singles live on Sunday morning. Dan Hicks and Johnny Miller hosted from the 18th tower, Gary Koch and Bob Murphy called holes, while on-course reporters were Mark Rolfing, Roger Maltbie, and Dottie Pepper. To provide a European perspective, NBC used former European team player Nick Faldo as a guest analyst on the Saturday afternoon session. Faldo had worked in the same role for NBC at the 2002 Ryder Cup, and at the time of the 2006 edition was in between jobs, having worked as an analyst for ABC Sports from 2004 to 2006, but having signed with CBS Sports for 2007 and beyond.

All 2008 matches were covered live in the United States. ESPN handled Friday coverage. Mike Tirico and Andy North hosted from the 18th tower, with Curtis Strange calling holes, and on-course reporters Billy Kratzert and Judy Rankin. With Azinger, ESPN's lead analyst, captaining the U.S. team, North was moved to the booth to fill Azinger's seat. NBC Sports covered the weekend action, with Dan Hicks and Johnny Miller hosting from the 18th tower, Gary Koch and Bob Murphy calling holes, and on-course reporters Mark Rolfing, Roger Maltbie, and Dottie Pepper.

All 2010 matches were covered live in the United States, a first for a Ryder Cup in Europe. ESPN handled Friday coverage. Mike Tirico and Paul Azinger hosted from the 18th tower, with Curtis Strange, Peter Alliss, and Sean McDonough calling holes, and on-course reporters Andy North, Billy Kratzert and Judy Rankin. Scott Van Pelt and Tom Weiskopf handled recaps during coverage. Most of ESPN's coverage was rained out on Friday, with a 7-hour rain delay during the middle of the day. NBC Sports covered the weekend action, with Dan Hicks and Johnny Miller hosting from the 18th tower, Gary Koch calling holes, and on-course reporters Mark Rolfing, Roger Maltbie, and Dottie Pepper. USA Network aired coverage of the singles live on Monday morning. The coverage was produced by corporate sibling NBC, with NBC's announcers being used on the telecast.

All 2012 matches were covered live in the United States. ESPN handled Friday coverage. Mike Tirico and Paul Azinger hosted from the 18th tower, with Curtis Strange and Sean McDonough calling holes, and on-course reporters Andy North and Billy Kratzert. Scott Van Pelt hosted recaps during coverage. On Saturday, Golf Channel covered the first half-hour of the morning matches with Kelly Tilghman, Brandel Chamblee and Nick Faldo. NBC covered the remainder of the weekend action, with Dan Hicks and Johnny Miller hosting from the 18th tower, Gary Koch and Peter Jacobsen calling holes, and on-course reporters Mark Rolfing, Roger Maltbie, and Dottie Pepper. To bring a European perspective to the telecasts, former European Ryder Cup player Colin Montgomerie was utilized as a guest analyst by NBC on Saturday. NBC had previously used guest analysts for the Ryder Cup in 1999, 2002, and 2006.

In the US, corporate siblings Golf Channel and NBC televised the 2014 event live, after NBC had traded for complete rights (that it was contractually given the rights to in 2005) back from ESPN, who had televised the previous three Ryder Cups on Friday. Golf Channel televised action on Friday and a half-hour on Saturday, from where NBC took over for the rest of the weekend. In the early-morning sessions, Terry Gannon hosted from the 18th tower alongside Frank Nobilo. Curt Byrum and Tom Abbott served as hole announcers and Jerry Foltz was an on-course commentator. Nick Faldo appeared as a guest commentator on Friday, and sparked controversy after critical comments about Sergio García. For the afternoon sessions and the singles matches on Sunday, the regular NBC golf crew provided coverage. Dan Hicks and Johnny Miller hosted from the 18th tower, with Gary Koch and Peter Jacobsen as hole announcers. On course commentators were Mark Rolfing, Roger Maltbie and Notah Begay III. On the weekend, Colin Montgomerie appeared as a guest commentator to lend a European perspective, a role he previously filled for NBC in 2012.

=== Analysts ===
Announcer	Years	Network
Paul Azinger	2021–present	NBC
David Feherty	2016–2021	NBC
Peter Kostis	1991–2006	USA
Gary McCord	1989	USA
Johnny Miller	1991–2018	NBC
Ben Wright	1989	USA

== See also ==
- List of ESPN/ABC golf commentators
- List of NBC Sports golf commentators
  - Golf Channel § Notable personalities
- PGA Tour on USA § Commentators
