= 2006 Ryder Cup =

Golf tournament in Ireland

36th Ryder Cup Matches
- Dates: 22–24 September 2006
- Venue: The K Club
- Location: County Kildare, Ireland
- Captains: Ian Woosnam (Europe); Tom Lehman (USA)
(Europe)	18 1/2	9 1/2	(United States)
- Europe wins the Ryder Cup

Location map
- Location within Ireland

The 36th Ryder Cup Matches were held 22–24 September 2006 in Ireland at the Palmer Course of the K Club in Straffan, County Kildare, west of Dublin. It was the first time the event was played in Ireland.

Europe won by 18 1/2 to 9 1/2 points, equalling their record winning margin of two years earlier for their third consecutive win, a first for Europe. Swedish rookie Henrik Stenson made the winning putt, just moments after Luke Donald sank a putt to ensure Europe retained the trophy.

== Course ==
The K Club has two Arnold Palmer-designed championship courses and the 36th Ryder Cup was held on the Palmer Course (also known as the North or Old Course). The course is a parkland course located on the banks of the River Liffey, threaded through mature woodlands on the Straffan country estate.

== Television ==
Domestically, Sky Sports provided live coverage of all sessions.

In the United States, coverage of the first day was recorded live, but presented on tape-delay by USA Network. Bill Macatee hosted from the 18th tower. On Saturday, NBC Sports presented coverage on tape, but recorded live. NBC then aired the singles live on Sunday morning. Dan Hicks and Johnny Miller hosted from the 18th tower, Gary Koch and Bob Murphy called holes, while on-course reporters were Mark Rolfing, Roger Maltbie, and Dottie Pepper. To provide a European perspective, NBC used former European team player Nick Faldo as a guest analyst on the Saturday afternoon session. Faldo had worked in the same role for NBC at the 2002 Ryder Cup, and at the time of the 2006 edition was in between jobs, having worked as an analyst for ABC Sports from 2004 to 2006, but having signed with CBS Sports for 2007 and beyond.

== Format ==
The Ryder Cup is a match play event, with each match worth one point. The competition format used in 2004 and 2006 was as follows:

- Day 1 (Friday) – 4 fourball (better ball) matches in a morning session and 4 foursome (alternate shot) matches in an afternoon session
- Day 2 (Saturday) – 4 fourball matches in a morning session and 4 foursome matches in an afternoon session
- Day 3 (Sunday) – 12 singles matches

With a total of 28 points, 14 1/2 points were required to win the Cup, and 14 points were required for the defending champion to retain the Cup. All matches were played to a maximum of 18 holes.

== Team qualification and selection ==
=== Europe ===
The European team consisted of:

- The top five players on the Ryder Cup World Points List
  - Total points earned in Official World Golf Ranking events from 1 September 2005 to 27 August 2006 and then only in the BMW International Open, which ended on 3 September
- The five players, not qualified above, on the Ryder Cup European Points List
  - Money earned in official European Tour events from 1 September 2005 to 3 September 2006
- Two captain's picks

=== United States ===
The United States team consisted of:

- The top ten players on the Ryder Cup Points List
  - Total points earned in PGA Tour events from 22 August 2004 to 20 August 2006. Points were awarded for top-10 finishes in these events based on the following table:

	1st	2nd	3rd	4th	5th	6th	7th	8th	9th	10th
2004 Regular events	75	45	40	35	30	25	20	15	10	5
2005 Regular events	75	45	40	35	30	25	20	15	10	5
2005 Majors	450	225	200	175	150	125	100	75	50	25
2006 Regular events	375	180	160	140	120	100	80	60	40	20
2006 Majors	675	360	320	280	240	200	160	120	80	40

- Two captain's picks

== Teams ==
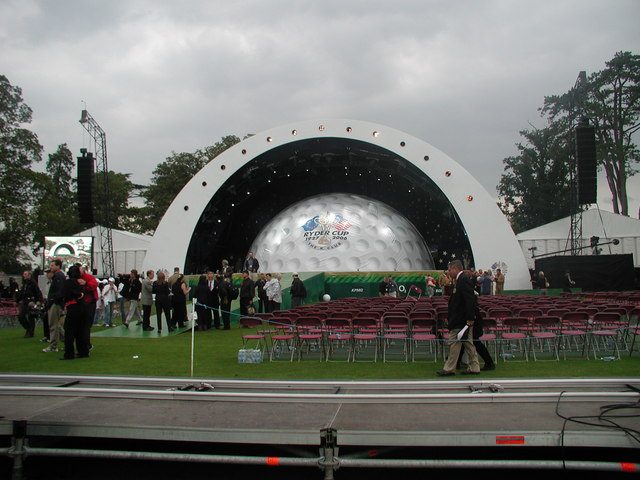
The opening ceremony of the 2006 Ryder Cup

Team Europe
Name	Age	Residence	Points rank (World)	Points rank (European)	World ranking	Previous Ryder Cups	Matches	W–L–H	Winning percentage
(Wales) Ian Woosnam	48	Llanymynech, partly in England and partly in Wales and Jersey	Non-playing captain
(Sweden) Henrik Stenson	30	Dubai, UAE	1	3	11	0	Rookie
(England) Luke Donald	28	High Wycombe, England and Chicago, Illinois, USA	2	8	9	1	4	2–1–1	62.50
(Spain) Sergio García	26	Borriol, Spain	3	4	8	3	15	10–3–2	73.33
(England) David Howell	31	Weybridge, England	4	2	13	1	2	1–1–0	50.00
(Scotland) Colin Montgomerie	43	Oxshott, England	5	1	14	7	32	19–8–5	67.19
(England) Paul Casey	29	Weybridge, England and Scottsdale, Arizona, USA	7	5	17	1	2	1–1–0	50.00
(Sweden) Robert Karlsson	37	Monaco	10	6	36	0	Rookie
(Republic of Ireland) Pádraig Harrington	35	Dublin, Ireland	8	7	18	3	12	7–4–1	62.50
(Republic of Ireland) Paul McGinley	39	Sunningdale, England	17	9	53	2	6	2–1–3	58.33
(Spain) José María Olazábal	40	Fuenterrabia, Spain	6	10	19	6	28	15–8–5	62.50
(Northern Ireland) Darren Clarke	38	Chobham, England	13	30	24	4	17	7–7–3	50.00
(England) Lee Westwood	33	Worksop, England	14	21	51	4	20	11–8–1	57.50

Captains picks are shown in yellow; the world rankings and records are at the start of the 2006 Ryder Cup.

As vice-captains, European captain Ian Woosnam selected Peter Baker and Des Smyth, to assist him during the tournament.

Team USA
Name	Age	Residence	Points rank	World ranking	Previous Ryder Cups	Matches	W–L–H	Winning percentage
Tom Lehman	47	Austin, Minnesota	Non-playing captain
Tiger Woods	30	Windermere, Florida	1	1	4	20	7–11–2	40.00
Phil Mickelson	36	Rancho Santa Fe, California	2	2	5	20	9–8–3	52.50
Jim Furyk	36	Ponte Vedra Beach, Florida	3	3	4	15	4–9–2	33.33
Chad Campbell	32	Lewisville, Texas	4	22	1	3	1–2–0	33.33
David Toms	39	Monroe, Louisiana	5	16	2	8	4–3–1	56.25
Chris DiMarco	38	Orlando, Florida	6	15	1	4	2–1–1	62.50
Vaughn Taylor	30	Augusta, Georgia	7	60	0	Rookie
J. J. Henry	31	Fairfield, Connecticut	8	64	0	Rookie
Zach Johnson	30	Cedar Rapids, Iowa	9	42	0	Rookie
Brett Wetterich	33	Cincinnati, Ohio	10	68	0	Rookie
Stewart Cink	33	Huntsville, Alabama	12	23	2	7	2–4–1	35.71
Scott Verplank	42	Dallas, Texas	20	37	1	3	2–1–0	66.67

Captains picks are shown in yellow; the world rankings and records are at the start of the 2006 Ryder Cup.

As vice-captains, United States captain Tom Lehman selected Corey Pavin and Loren Roberts, to assist him during the tournament.

== Friday's matches ==
=== Morning four-ball ===
	Results
Harrington/Montgomerie	(United States) 1 up	Woods/Furyk
Casey/Karlsson	halved	Cink/Henry
García/Olazábal	(Europe) 3 & 2	Toms/Wetterich
Clarke/Westwood	(Europe) 1 up	Mickelson/DiMarco
2 1/2	Session	1 1/2
2 1/2	Overall	1 1/2

=== Afternoon foursomes ===
	Results
Harrington/McGinley	halved	Campbell/Johnson
Howell/Stenson	halved	Cink/Toms
Westwood/Montgomerie	halved	Mickelson/DiMarco
Donald/García	(Europe) 2 up	Woods/Furyk
2 1/2	Session	1 1/2
5	Overall	3

== Saturday's matches ==
=== Morning four-ball ===
	Results
Casey/Karlsson	halved	Cink/Henry
García/Olazábal	(Europe) 3 & 2	Mickelson/DiMarco
Clarke/Westwood	(Europe) 3 & 2	Woods/Furyk
Stenson/Harrington	(United States) 2 & 1	Verplank/Johnson
2 1/2	Session	1 1/2
7 1/2	Overall	4 1/2

=== Afternoon foursomes ===
	Results
García/Donald	(Europe) 2 & 1	Mickelson/Toms
Montgomerie/Westwood	halved	Campbell/Taylor
Casey/Howell	(Europe) 5 & 4	Cink/Johnson
Harrington/McGinley	(United States) 3 & 2	Furyk/Woods
2 1/2	Session	1 1/2
10	Overall	6

== Sunday's singles matches ==
	Results
Colin Montgomerie	(Europe) 1 up	David Toms
Sergio García	(United States) 4 & 3	Stewart Cink
Paul Casey	(Europe) 2 & 1	Jim Furyk
Robert Karlsson	(United States) 3 & 2	Tiger Woods
Luke Donald	(Europe) 2 & 1	Chad Campbell
Paul McGinley	halved	J. J. Henry
Darren Clarke	(Europe) 3 & 2	Zach Johnson
Henrik Stenson	(Europe) 4 & 3	Vaughn Taylor
David Howell	(Europe) 5 & 4	Brett Wetterich
José María Olazábal	(Europe) 2 & 1	Phil Mickelson
Lee Westwood	(Europe) 2 up	Chris DiMarco
Pádraig Harrington	(United States) 4 & 3	Scott Verplank
8 1/2	Session	3 1/2
18 1/2	Overall	9 1/2

== Individual player records ==
Each entry refers to the win–loss–half record of the player.

=== Europe ===
Player	Points	Overall	Singles	Foursomes	Fourballs
Paul Casey	3	2–0–2	1–0–0	1–0–0	0–0–2
Darren Clarke	3	3–0–0	1–0–0	0–0–0	2–0–0
Luke Donald	3	3–0–0	1–0–0	2–0–0	0–0–0
Sergio García	4	4–1–0	0–1–0	2–0–0	2–0–0
Pádraig Harrington	0.5	0–4–1	0–1–0	0–1–1	0–2–0
David Howell	2.5	2–0–1	1–0–0	1–0–1	0–0–0
Robert Karlsson	1	0–1–2	0–1–0	0–0–0	0–0–2
Paul McGinley	1	0–1–2	0–0–1	0–1–1	0–0–0
Colin Montgomerie	2	1–1–2	1–0–0	0–0–2	0–1–0
José María Olazábal	3	3–0–0	1–0–0	0–0–0	2–0–0
Henrik Stenson	1.5	1–1–1	1–0–0	0–0–1	0–1–0
Lee Westwood	4	3–0–2	1–0–0	0–0–2	2–0–0

=== United States ===
Player	Points	Overall	Singles	Foursomes	Fourballs
Chad Campbell	1	0–1–2	0–1–0	0–0–2	0–0–0
Stewart Cink	2.5	1–1–3	1–0–0	0–1–1	0–0–2
Chris DiMarco	0.5	0–3–1	0–1–0	0–0–1	0–2–0
Jim Furyk	2	2–3–0	0–1–0	1–1–0	1–1–0
J. J. Henry	1.5	0–0–3	0–0–1	0–0–0	0–0–2
Zach Johnson	1.5	1–2–1	0–1–0	0–1–1	1–0–0
Phil Mickelson	0.5	0–4–1	0–1–0	0–1–1	0–2–0
Vaughn Taylor	0.5	0–1–1	0–1–0	0–0–1	0–0–0
David Toms	0.5	0–3–1	0–1–0	0–1–1	0–1–0
Scott Verplank	2	2–0–0	1–0–0	0–0–0	1–0–0
Brett Wetterich	0	0–2–0	0–1–0	0–0–0	0–1–0
Tiger Woods	3	3–2–0	1–0–0	1–1–0	1–1–0
