= 2004 Ryder Cup =

Golf tournament in Michigan, U.S.

35th Ryder Cup Matches
- Dates: September 17–19, 2004
- Venue: Oakland Hills Country Club; South Course
- Location: Bloomfield Township, Michigan
- Captains: Hal Sutton (USA); Bernhard Langer (Europe)
(United States)	9 1/2	18 1/2	(Europe)
- Europe wins the Ryder Cup

Location map
- Location within Michigan

The 35th Ryder Cup Matches were held September 17–19, 2004, in the United States at the South Course of Oakland Hills Country Club in Bloomfield Township, Michigan, a suburb northwest of Detroit.

The European team won the competition by a margin of 18 1/2 to 9 1/2 points, The victory margin was the largest by a European team in the history of the event, and the largest by either side since 1981, when Team USA defeated Team Europe by the same score. It was also the largest margin of defeat for the USA since the competition started in 1927.

== Television ==
In the United States, live Friday coverage was provided by USA Network. Bill Macatee and Peter Kostis hosted from the 18th tower. NBC Sports presented live coverage of the Saturday and Sunday matches. Dan Hicks and Johnny Miller hosted from the 18th tower, Bob Murphy called holes, while on-course reporters were Gary Koch, Mark Rolfing, Roger Maltbie, and Ed Sneed.

== Format ==
The Ryder Cup is a match play event, with each match worth one point. The competition format changed slightly from used from that used from 1991 to 2002, with the order of play swapped on the second day:

- Day 1 (Friday) — 4 fourball (better ball) matches in a morning session and 4 foursome (alternate shot) matches in an afternoon session
- Day 2 (Saturday) — 4 fourball matches in a morning session and 4 foursome matches in an afternoon session
- Day 3 (Sunday) — 12 singles matches

With a total of 28 points, 14 1/2 points were required to win the Cup, and 14 points were required for the defending champion to retain the Cup. All matches were played to a maximum of 18 holes.

== Teams ==
Team USA
Name	Age	Residence	Points rank	World ranking	Previous Ryder Cups	Matches	W–L–H	Winning percentage
Hal Sutton	47	Shreveport, Louisiana	Non-playing captain
Tiger Woods	28	Windermere, Florida	1	2	3	15	5–8–2	40.00
Phil Mickelson	34	Rancho Santa Fe, California	2	4	4	16	8–5–3	59.38
Davis Love III	40	Sea Island, Georgia	3	6	5	21	8–9–4	47.62
Jim Furyk	34	Ponte Vedra Beach, Florida	4	11	3	11	3–6–2	36.36
Kenny Perry	44	Franklin, Kentucky	5	16	0	Rookie
David Toms	37	Shreveport, Louisiana	6	22	1	5	3–1–1	70.00
Chad Campbell	30	Lewisville, Texas	7	14	0	Rookie
Chris DiMarco	36	Orlando, Florida	8	17	0	Rookie
Fred Funk	48	Ponte Vedra Beach, Florida	9	59	0	Rookie
Chris Riley	30	Las Vegas, Nevada	10	40	0	Rookie
Jay Haas	50	Greenville, South Carolina	12	23	2	8	3–4–1	43.75
Stewart Cink	31	Duluth, Georgia	14	10	1	3	1–2–0	33.33

Captains picks are shown in yellow; the world rankings and records are at the start of the 2004 Ryder Cup.

As vice-captains, United States captain Hal Sutton selected Jack Burke and Steve Jones, to assist him during the tournament.

Team Europe
Name	Age	Residence	Points rank (World)	Points rank (European)	World ranking	Previous Ryder Cups	Matches	W–L–H	Winning percentage
(Germany) Bernhard Langer	47	Anhausen, Germany; Boca Raton, Florida, USA	Non-playing captain
(Republic of Ireland) Pádraig Harrington	33	Dublin, Ireland	1	5	8	2	7	3–3–1	50.00
(Spain) Sergio García	24	Borriol, Spain	2	23	12	2	10	6–3–1	65.00
(Northern Ireland) Darren Clarke	36	Chobham, England	3	3	15	3	12	4–6–2	41.67
(Spain) Miguel Ángel Jiménez	40	Málaga, Spain	4	1	20	1	5	1–2–2	40.00
(England) Lee Westwood	31	Worksop, England	5	2	41	3	15	7–8–0	46.67
(France) Thomas Levet	36	Warfield, England	7	4	43	0	Rookie
(England) Paul Casey	27	Weybridge, England; Scottsdale, Arizona, USA	8	6	27	0	Rookie
(England) David Howell	29	Weybridge, England	13	7	38	0	Rookie
(Republic of Ireland) Paul McGinley	37	Sunningdale, England	11	8	67	1	3	0–1–2	33.33
(England) Ian Poulter	28	Milton Keynes, England	10	9	60	0	Rookie
(England) Luke Donald	26	High Wycombe, England; Chicago, Illinois, USA	9	36	36	0	Rookie
(Scotland) Colin Montgomerie	41	Troon, Scotland	19	16	62	6	28	16–7–5	66.07

Captains picks are shown in yellow; the world rankings and records are at the start of the 2004 Ryder Cup.

As vice-captains, European captain Bernhard Langer selected Joakim Haeggman and Anders Forsbrand to assist him during the tournament.

== Thursday practice ==
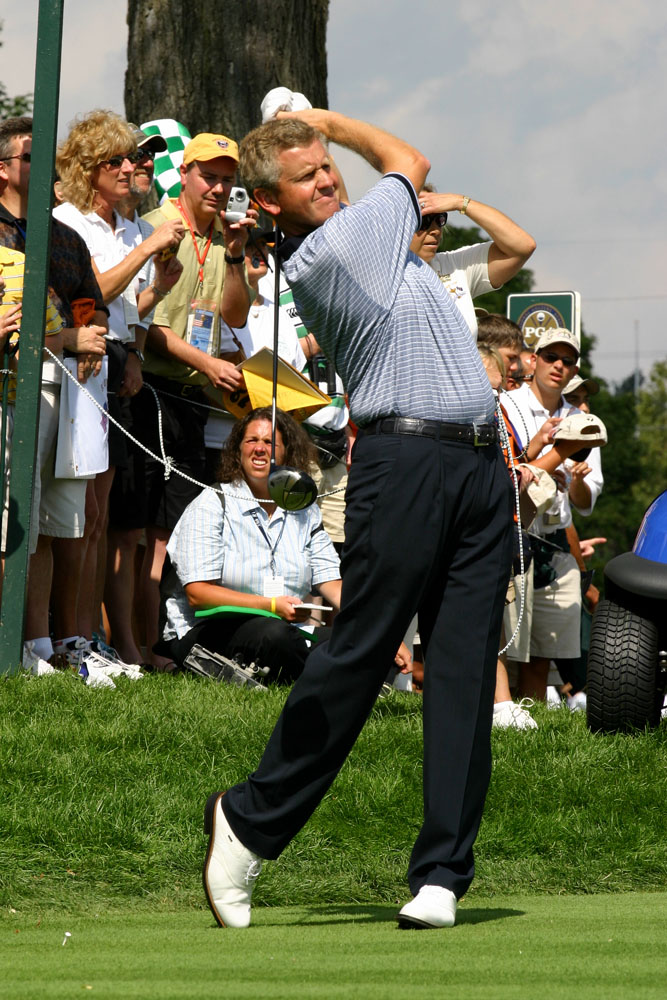
Colin Montgomerie

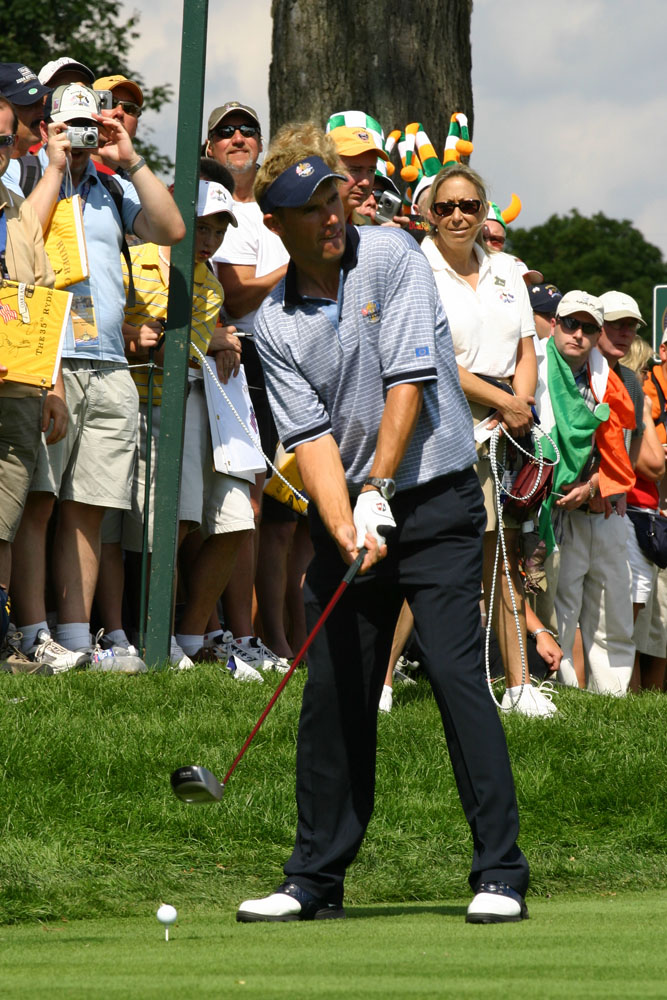
Pádraig Harrington

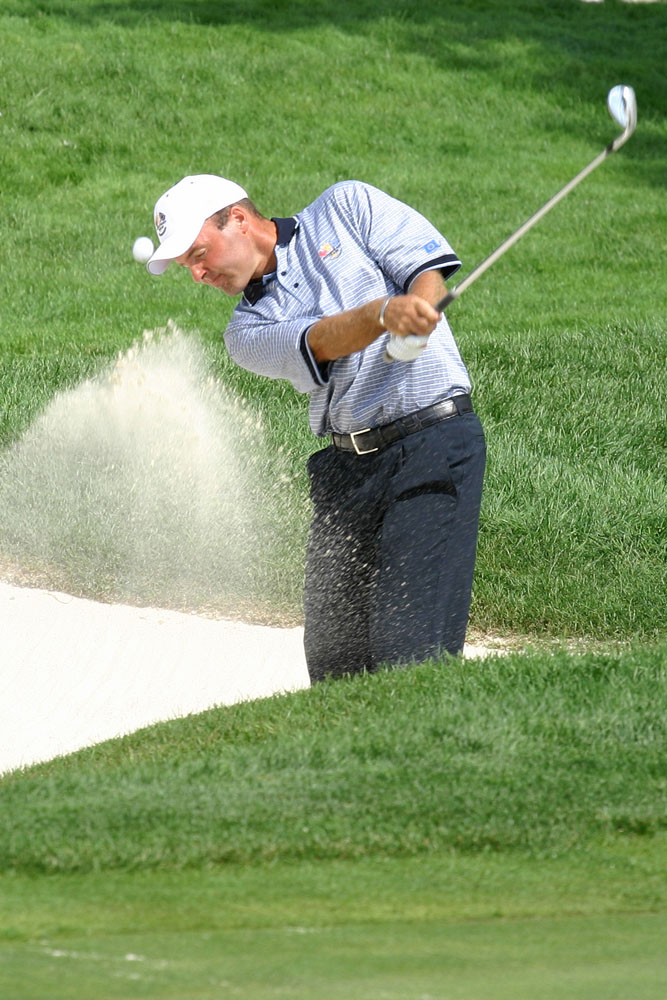
Thomas Levet

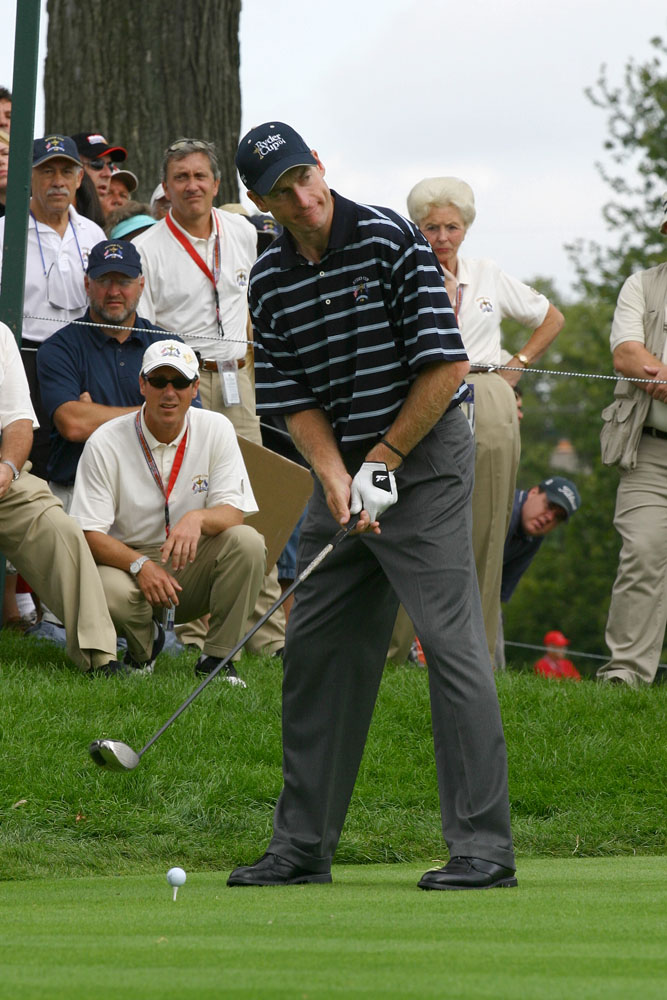
Jim Furyk

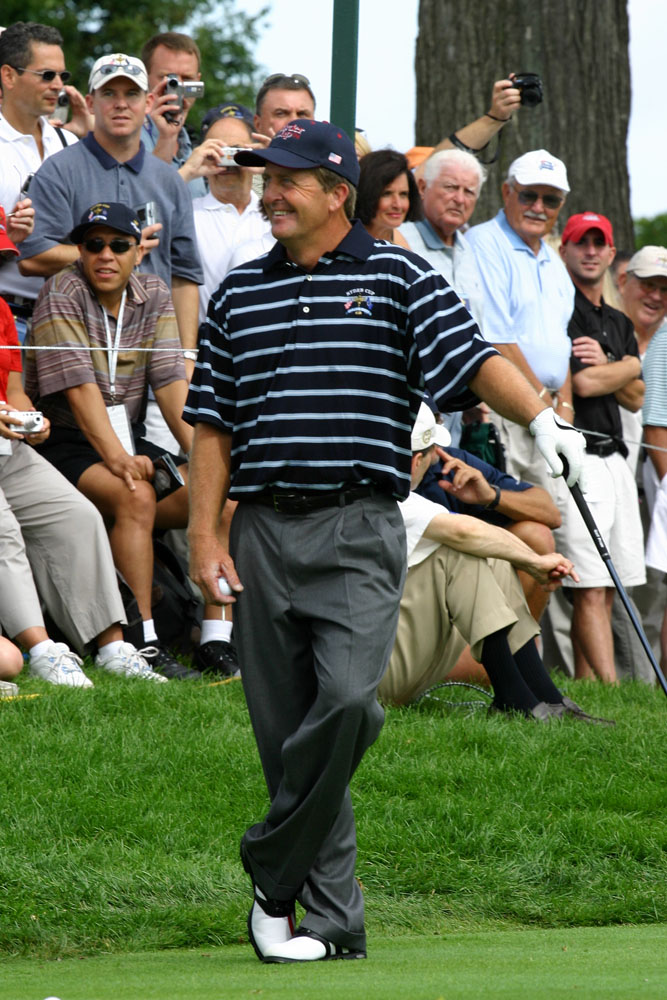
Fred Funk

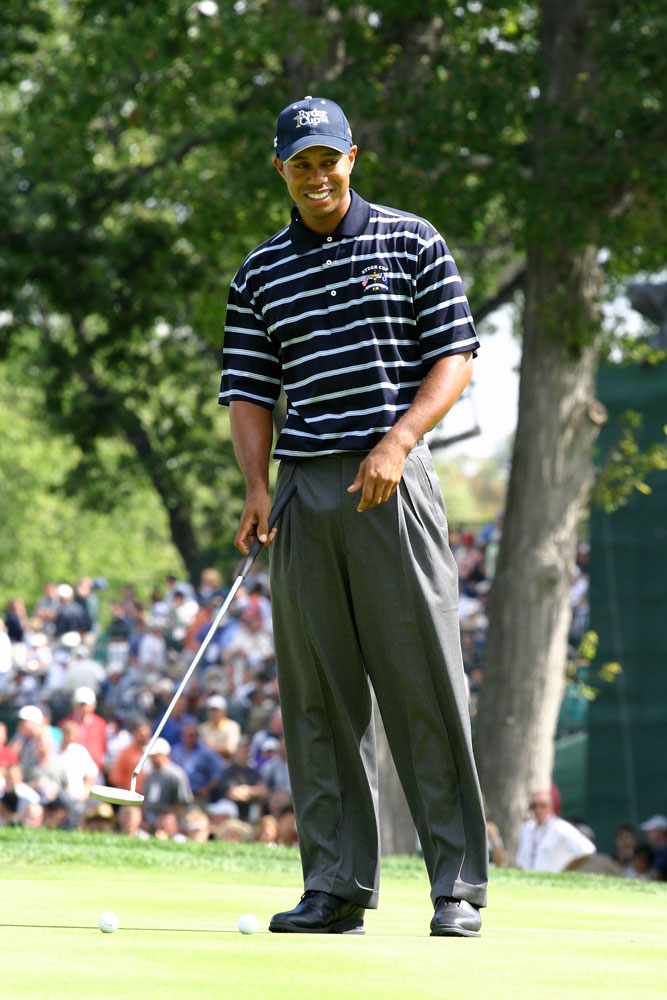
Tiger Woods

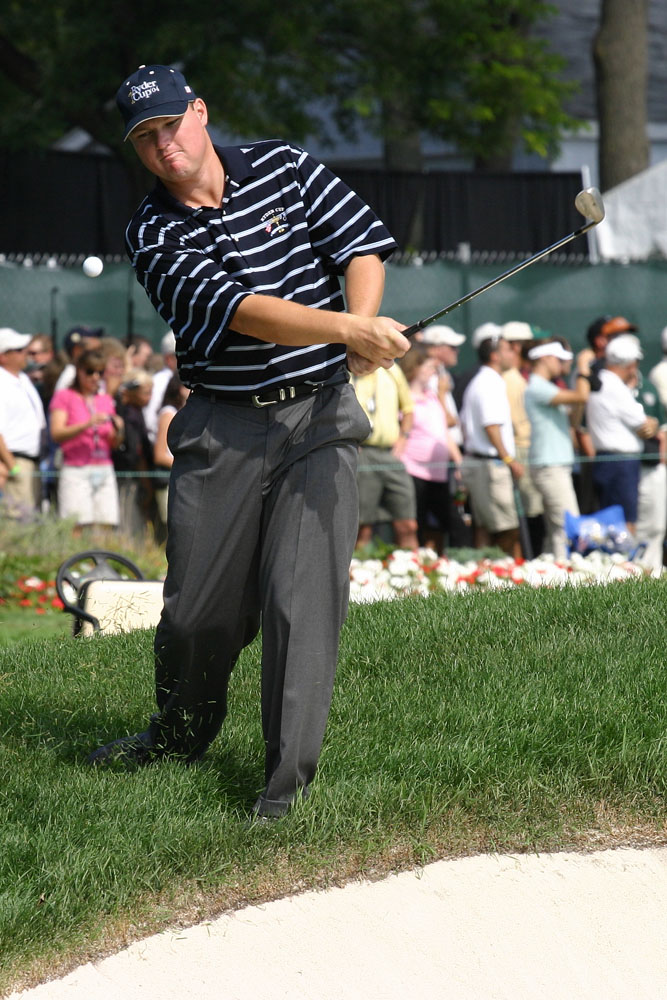
Chad Campbell

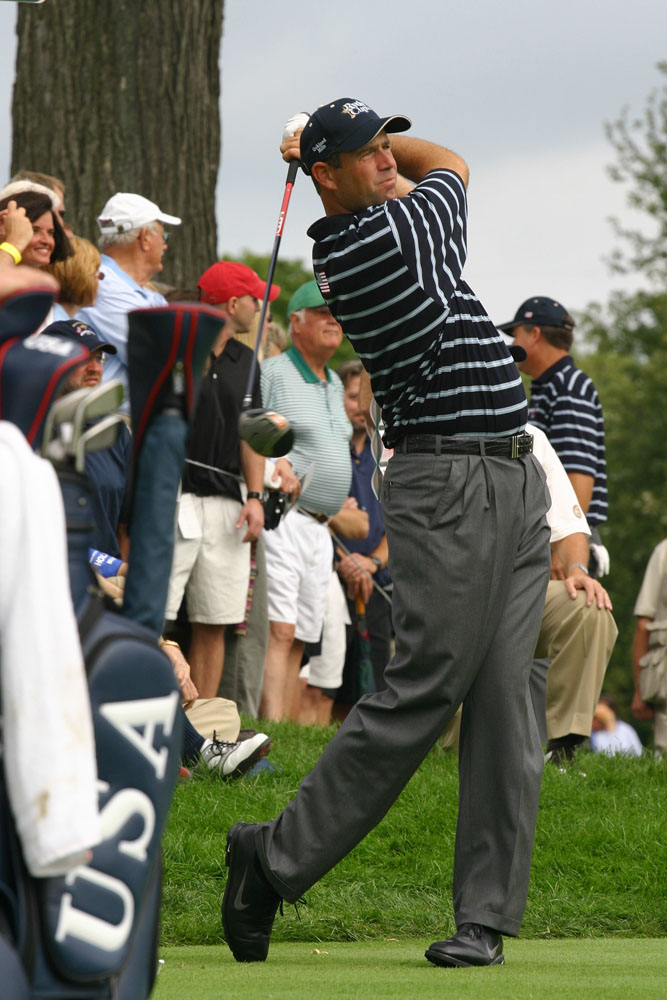
Stewart Cink

== Friday's matches ==
=== Morning four-ball ===
U.S. captain Hal Sutton put his top pairing of Tiger Woods and Phil Mickelson in the first match of the Ryder Cup, hoping to come out to a quick lead. The decision backfired on Sutton, as the Woods/Mickelson pairing fell behind almost from the start, eventually losing. Only a 7-foot par putt by Chris Riley on the 18th hole of his match kept Team USA from being shut out by Team Europe. Team USA never had the lead during any of the first day's four-ball matches.

	Results
Montgomerie/Harrington	(Europe) 2 & 1	Mickelson/Woods
Clarke/Jiménez	(Europe) 5 & 4	Campbell/Love III
McGinley/Donald	halved	Riley/Cink
García/Westwood	(Europe) 4 & 3	Toms/Furyk
3 1/2	Session	1/2
3 1/2	Overall	1/2

=== Afternoon foursomes ===
The afternoon alternate-shot session was almost as good for Team Europe as the morning session. Mickelson and Woods lost an early lead in their match, leaving Woods winless in the first day of his last three Ryder Cups. Team USA picked up its first full point, but Europe ended the day with a 6 1/2–1 1/2 lead, its largest lead after the first day in Ryder Cup history.

	Results
Jiménez/Levet	(United States) 3 & 2	DiMarco/Haas
Montgomerie/Harrington	(Europe) 4 & 2	Love III/Funk
Clarke/Westwood	(Europe) 1 up	Mickelson/Woods
García/Donald	(Europe) 2 & 1	Perry/Cink
3	Session	1
6 1/2	Overall	1 1/2

== Saturday's matches ==
=== Morning four-ball ===
	Results
García/Westwood	halved	Haas/DiMarco
Clarke/Poulter	(United States) 4 & 3	Woods/Riley
Casey/Howell	(Europe) 1 up	Furyk/Campbell
Montgomerie/Harrington	(United States) 3 & 2	Cink/Love III
1 1/2	Session	2 1/2
8	Overall	4

=== Afternoon foursomes ===
	Results
Clarke/Westwood	(Europe) 5 & 4	Haas/DiMarco
Jiménez/Levet	(United States) 4 & 3	Mickelson/Toms
García/Donald	(Europe) 1 up	Furyk/Funk
Harrington/McGinley	(Europe) 4 & 3	Love III/Woods
3	Session	1
11	Overall	5

== Sunday's singles matches ==
	Results
Paul Casey	(United States) 3 & 2	Tiger Woods
Sergio García	(Europe) 3 & 2	Phil Mickelson
Darren Clarke	halved	Davis Love III
David Howell	(United States) 6 & 4	Jim Furyk
Lee Westwood	(Europe) 1 up	Kenny Perry
Colin Montgomerie	(Europe) 1 up	David Toms
Luke Donald	(United States) 5 & 3	Chad Campbell
Miguel Ángel Jiménez	(United States) 1 up	Chris DiMarco
Thomas Levet	(Europe) 1 up	Fred Funk
Ian Poulter	(Europe) 3 & 2	Chris Riley
Pádraig Harrington	(Europe) 1 up	Jay Haas
Paul McGinley	(Europe) 3 & 2	Stewart Cink
7 1/2	Session	4 1/2
18 1/2	Overall	9 1/2

== Individual player records ==
Each entry refers to the win–loss–half record of the player.

=== United States ===
Player	Points	Overall	Singles	Foursomes	Fourballs
Chad Campbell	1	1–2–0	1–0–0	0–0–0	0–2–0
Stewart Cink	1.5	1–2–1	0–1–0	0–1–0	1–0–1
Chris DiMarco	2.5	2–1–1	1–0–0	1–1–0	0–0–1
Fred Funk	0	0–3–0	0–1–0	0–2–0	0–0–0
Jim Furyk	1	1–3–0	1–0–0	0–1–0	0–2–0
Jay Haas	1.5	1–2–1	0–1–0	1–1–0	0–0–1
Davis Love III	1.5	1–3–1	0–0–1	0–2–0	1–1–0
Phil Mickelson	1	1–3–0	0–1–0	1–1–0	0–1–0
Kenny Perry	0	0–2–0	0–1–0	0–1–0	0–0–0
Chris Riley	1.5	1–1–1	0–1–0	0–0–0	1–0–1
David Toms	1	1–2–0	0–1–0	1–0–0	0–1–0
Tiger Woods	2	2–3–0	1–0–0	0–2–0	1–1–0

=== Europe ===
Player	Points	Overall	Singles	Foursomes	Fourballs
Paul Casey	1	1–1–0	0–1–0	0–0–0	1–0–0
Darren Clarke	3.5	3–1–1	0–0–1	2–0–0	1–1–0
Luke Donald	2.5	2–1–1	0–1–0	2–0–0	0–0–1
Sergio García	4.5	4–0–1	1–0–0	2–0–0	1–0–1
Pádraig Harrington	4	4–1–0	1–0–0	2–0–0	1–1–0
David Howell	1	1–1–0	0–1–0	0–0–0	1–0–0
Miguel Ángel Jiménez	1	1–3–0	0–1–0	0–2–0	1–0–0
Thomas Levet	1	1–2–0	1–0–0	0–2–0	0–0–0
Paul McGinley	2.5	2–0–1	1–0–0	1–0–0	0–0–1
Colin Montgomerie	3	3–1–0	1–0–0	1–0–0	1–1–0
Ian Poulter	1	1–1–0	1–0–0	0–0–0	0–1–0
Lee Westwood	4.5	4–0–1	1–0–0	2–0–0	1–0–1
