= 1999 Ryder Cup =

1999 edition of the Ryder Cup

33rd Ryder Cup Matches
- Dates: September 24–26, 1999
- Venue: The Country Club, Championship Course
- Location: Brookline, Massachusetts
- Captains: Ben Crenshaw (USA); Mark James (Europe)
(United States)	14 1/2	13 1/2	(Europe)
- United States won the Ryder Cup

Location map
- Location within Massachusetts

The 33rd Ryder Cup, also known as the "Battle of Brookline", was held September 24–26, 1999, in the United States at The Country Club in Brookline, Massachusetts, a suburb southwest of Boston.

The American team won the competition by a margin of 14 1/2 to 13 1/2, The Europeans, leading 10–6 heading into the final round, needed only 4 points on the final day to retain the cup. The Americans rallied on the Sunday, winning the first 6 matches of the day to surge into the lead. Further wins by Steve Pate and Jim Furyk took them into a 14–12 lead. The Americans recaptured the Ryder Cup when Justin Leonard halved his match with José María Olazábal. With the match all-square Leonard holed a 45-foot birdie putt on the 17th hole. After controversial premature celebrations on the green, Olazabal then missed his 22-foot birdie putt to leave Leonard one up with just one hole to play, assuring him of a half point and guaranteeing an American victory.

The behavior of both U.S. spectators and the U.S. team was criticized by both American and European media. U.S. spectators raucously heckled and abused European players. Allegations were also made regarding cheating on the part of course marshals. Notoriously, the U.S. team raucously invaded the 17th green after Leonard had holed his long putt but before Olazábal had attempted his shorter putt. The incident was viewed by many in both the US and Europe as appalling sportsmanship and gamesmanship. Veteran broadcaster Alistair Cooke described the last day of the tournament as "a date that will live in infamy" in a Letter from America entitled "The arrival of the golf hooligan".

At the time, the American win was the largest final day come-from-behind victory in Ryder Cup history; Europe achieved the same feat in 2012. It is still widely regarded as one of the most impressive come-from-behind victories in recent sports history.

This was one of the last public appearances of Payne Stewart, who died in a plane crash less than a month later.

== Pre-match comments ==
In the lead-up to the Ryder Cup, Payne Stewart said of the European team, "On paper, they should be caddying for us." Jeff Maggert echoed the sentiment in a press conference prior to the matches, saying, "Let's face it, we've got the 12 best players in the world." Colin Montgomerie declined to react, saying, "You want someone to bite. Well, I'm not going to."

== The course ==
The Country Club, located in Brookline, Massachusetts, is one of the oldest country clubs in the United States. It was one of the five charter clubs which founded the United States Golf Association, and has hosted numerous USGA tournaments including the U.S. Open in 1913, won by then-unknown Francis Ouimet. The club is one of the largest of its kind in the northeastern U.S., with about 1300 members.

The club has two courses, but neither was used in its entirety for the Ryder Cup. The 18-hole Main Course, regularly played by club members, is essentially identical to the original 18-hole course completed in 1899 and used for the 1913 U.S. Open. The 9-hole Primrose Course was added in 1927. Major events that require a longer course, such as the Ryder Cup, use a layout most often known as the Championship Course, using 15 holes from the Main Course and replacing three with parts of the Primrose Course. Specifically, one hole of the Main Course is replaced by a composite hole that uses the teeing ground of the 1st Primrose hole and the putting green of the 2nd Primrose hole, and two holes from the Main Course are entirely replaced by the 8th and 9th holes of the Primrose Course.

== Television ==
The 33rd Ryder Cup was covered live in the United States for all five sessions. USA Network covered the Friday action, with Bill Macatee and Peter Kostis in the 18th tower. The weekend was covered live by NBC Sports, with Dick Enberg and Johnny Miller in the 18th tower, Dan Hicks calling holes, and on-course reporters Gary Koch, Mark Rolfing, Roger Maltbie, and John Schroeder. Jim Gray conducted interviews, and on the final day was also used as a fifth on-course reporter. On the weekend, former European Ryder Cup captain Bernard Gallacher was brought in as a guest analyst to provide a European perspective.

In the UK, BBC and Sky Sports both had a presence, with Peter Alliss and Ewen Murray being the lead broadcaster for each with contributions from Butch Harmon, Bernard Gallacher, Peter Oosterhuis and Tony Jacklin.

== Format ==
The Ryder Cup is a match play event, with each match worth one point. The competition format used from 1991 to 2002 was as follows:

- Day 1 (Friday) — 4 four-ball (better ball) matches in a morning session and 4 foursome (alternate shot) matches in an afternoon session
- Day 2 (Saturday) — 4 foursome matches in a morning session and 4 four-ball matches in an afternoon session
- Day 3 (Sunday) — 12 singles matches

With a total of 28 points, 14 1/2 points were required to win the Cup, and 14 points were required for the defending champion to retain the Cup. All matches were played to a maximum of 18 holes.

== Teams ==
=== Team Europe ===
The 1999 European Team Points Table began in September 1998, and concluded on August 22, 1999, after the BMW International Open. The top 10 players in the Points Table qualified automatically for the team. Captain Mark James then left out the number 11 player Robert Karlsson and the experienced (but out-of-form) Bernhard Langer by instead selecting Andrew Coltart and Jesper Parnevik as the two 'wild card' players to round out the team.

Team Europe
Name	Age	Points rank	World ranking	Previous Ryder Cups	Matches	W–L–H	Winning percentage
(England) Mark James	45	Non-playing captain
(Scotland) Colin Montgomerie	36	1	3	4	18	9–6–3	58.33
(England) Lee Westwood	26	2	5	1	5	2–3–0	40.00
(Northern Ireland) Darren Clarke	31	3	21	1	2	1–1–0	50.00
(Scotland) Paul Lawrie	30	4	48	0	Rookie
(Spain) Miguel Ángel Jiménez	35	5	45	0	Rookie
(Spain) José María Olazábal	33	6	24	5	25	14–8–3	62.00
(Spain) Sergio García	19	7	25	0	Rookie
(Sweden) Jarmo Sandelin	32	8	73	0	Rookie
(France) Jean van de Velde	33	9	90	0	Rookie
(Republic of Ireland) Pádraig Harrington	28	10	72	0	Rookie
(Scotland) Andrew Coltart	29	12	66	0	Rookie
(Sweden) Jesper Parnevik	34	15	15	1	4	1–1–2	50.00

Captains picks are shown in yellow; the world rankings and records are at the start of the 1999 Ryder Cup.

As vice-captains, European captain Mark James selected Ken Brown and Sam Torrance, to assist him during the tournament.

=== Team USA ===
The 1999 U.S. Ryder Cup Team was chosen on the basis of points compiled by the PGA of America, early 1998, through the 81st PGA Championship, August 12–15, 1999. Points were awarded for top-10 finishes at PGA Tour co-sponsored or sanctioned events, with added emphasis on major championships and events played during the Ryder Cup year. The top 10 finishers on the points list automatically qualified for the 12-member team, and U.S. Captain Ben Crenshaw selected the final two players—Steve Pate and Tom Lehman.

Team USA
Name	Age	Points rank	World ranking	Previous Ryder Cups	Matches	W–L–H	Winning percentage
Ben Crenshaw	47	Non-playing captain
Tiger Woods	23	1	1	1	5	1–3–1	30.00
David Duval	27	2	2	0	Rookie
Payne Stewart	42	3	8	4	16	8–7–1	53.12
Davis Love III	35	4	4	3	13	5–8–0	38.46
Mark O'Meara	42	5	11	4	12	4–7–1	37.50
Hal Sutton	41	6	10	2	9	3–3–3	50.00
Justin Leonard	27	7	12	1	4	0–2–2	25.00
Jim Furyk	29	8	14	1	3	1–2–0	33.33
Phil Mickelson	29	9	13	2	7	4–1–2	71.43
Jeff Maggert	35	10	16	2	7	4–3–0	57.14
Tom Lehman	40	12	23	2	7	3–2–2	57.14
Steve Pate	38	14	28	1	2	0–1–1	25.00

Captains picks are shown in yellow; the world rankings and records are at the start of the 1999 Ryder Cup.

As vice-captains, United States captain Ben Crenshaw selected Bruce Lietzke and Bill Rogers, to assist him during the tournament.

== Friday's matches ==
=== Morning foursomes ===
Paul Lawrie hit the opening tee shot to begin the 33rd Ryder Cup Matches. The Americans got off to a good start when Tom Lehman chipped in at the first hole, but the matches quickly swung toward Europe's favor. With the Americans' top two pairings losing, the Europeans gained confidence, finding a dynamic duo in Jesper Parnevik and Sergio García.

	Results
Montgomerie/Lawrie	(Europe) 3 & 2	Mickelson/Duval
García/Parnevik	(Europe) 2 & 1	Lehman/Woods
Jiménez/Harrington	halved	Love III/Stewart
Clarke/Westwood	(United States) 3 & 2	Maggert/Sutton
2 1/2	Session	1 1/2
2 1/2	Overall	1 1/2

=== Afternoon four-ball ===
Lee Westwood and Darren Clarke defeated Tiger Woods and David Duval, the top two players in the world rankings. Woods missed a short eagle putt at the 14th that would have squared the match, while Westwood hit a fantastic chip shot at the final hole to secure victory. Both Duval and Woods were shut out on day one.

The day's best match, and arguably the best team match of the week, pitted Parnevik and García against Phil Mickelson and Jim Furyk. Parnevik holed out for eagle at the par-4 eighth, putting him and García a combined 6-under-par for the match, but just 1 up. At the 13th, Furyk chipped in from near a pond to square the match, giving the American fans a chance to go into a frenzy. At the next hole, Garcia pitched in for an eagle from just the right of the green at the par 5, putting Europe back in front. At the 16th hole, with the Americans 1 down, Mickelson hit his tee shot inside of four feet from the hole. He was left with the short putt to square the match, but missed it, and the Americans continued to trail. At the final hole, Mickelson again put the ball within five feet of the hole, but again missed the putt, leaving the Americans with an agonizing 1 down loss, and keeping Parnevik and García unbeaten.

	Results
Montgomerie/Lawrie	halved	Love III/Leonard
García/Parnevik	(Europe) 1 up	Mickelson/Furyk
Jiménez/Olazábal	(Europe) 2 & 1	Maggert/Sutton
Clarke/Westwood	(Europe) 1 up	Duval/Woods
3 1/2	Session	1/2
6	Overall	2

== Saturday's matches ==
=== Morning foursomes ===
Tiger Woods won his first match of the week, teaming with new partner Steve Pate. Woods eagled 14 while Pate hit a shot from the rough at the 18th to within 15 feet to secure the win over Pádraig Harrington and Miguel Ángel Jiménez.

Jesper Parnevik and Sergio García won their third straight match, dominating the back nine to handily beat Justin Leonard and Payne Stewart.

The final match on the course pitted Jeff Maggert and Hal Sutton against Colin Montgomerie and Paul Lawrie. Maggert took the match into his hands in the final holes, making a long birdie putt at 17 to put the Americans in front, then sealing the win by hitting his approach within 5 feet at the final hole.

	Results
Montgomerie/Lawrie	(United States) 1 up	Sutton/Maggert
Clarke/Westwood	(Europe) 3 & 2	Furyk/O'Meara
Jiménez/Harrington	(United States) 1 up	Woods/Pate
Parnevik/García	(Europe) 3 & 2	Stewart/Leonard
2	Session	2
8	Overall	4

=== Afternoon four-ball ===
With the Americans desperate to climb back into the contest, Captain Ben Crenshaw changed up some pairings in hope of making up at least two points. After playing with Maggert during the first three sessions, Sutton teamed with Leonard, but could only produce a half against the Spanish duo of Miguel Ángel Jiménez and José María Olazábal.

Woods and Pate played together again, facing Montgomerie and Lawrie. Pate chipped in for birdie at the first hole, just as Lehman had done the day before, also while playing with Woods. However, the world #1 missed key putts on the back nine and lost for the third time in four matches.

Phil Mickelson finally found his game, nearing holing out for eagle at the 10th, as he and Tom Lehman defeated Lee Westwood and Darren Clarke.

The most dramatic finish of the session came in the match pitting Davis Love III and David Duval against García and Parnevik. Love had hit a heroic approach at the 9th from a large rock formation to secure an eagle, followed by a Duval birdie at 10 to go 1 up. Parnevik then responded by pitching in for a par at the 12th to halve the hole, causing García to engage in a large display of emotion, running onto the green pumping his fists, then doing a victory lap. However, the Americans were on the verge of handing the European duo their first loss of the week, with Love and Duval still 1 up on the final hole. Both Love and García had birdie opportunities. Love's putt was to win the match, but he missed. García then holed his birdie to salvage a half point, keeping he and Parnevik undefeated for the week, and causing another wild European celebration.

	Results
Clarke/Westwood	(United States) 2 & 1	Mickelson/Lehman
Parnevik/García	halved	Love III/Duval
Jiménez/Olazábal	halved	Leonard/Sutton
Montgomerie/Lawrie	(Europe) 2 & 1	Pate/Woods
2	Session	2
10	Overall	6

== Sunday's singles matches ==
No team had previously come back from more than two points down on the final day to win the Ryder Cup. Team Europe captain Mark James put most of the team's strength at the back of the lineup. Meanwhile, Ben Crenshaw arranged the American lineup to put most of the strength at the beginning, knowing that a fast start was needed if the Americans were going to recover from the four point deficit. This led to several early mismatches. James had not played three of his rookies during team play: Jarmo Sandelin, Jean van de Velde, and Andrew Coltart. Due to the opposite strategies, this resulted in the three rookies playing their first Ryder Cup matches against the three top American players at that time, Phil Mickelson, Davis Love III, and Tiger Woods.

Tom Lehman and Lee Westwood, playing in the lead match, halved the first three holes. However, the Europeans seemed to pick up where they had left off when Darren Clarke chipped in at the opening hole, though Hal Sutton squared the match at the next hole and did not trail again. The matches were close in the early stages, but then Love chipped in at the 5th for a birdie, which seemed to inspire his teammates. Woods, looking much more comfortable in individual play, followed with a chip-in of his own a few minutes later at the 8th, which caused an enormous roar from the crowd that could be heard through the course. The Americans now had the lead in the first six matches. Love secured the first point of the day, winning 6 & 5 over Van de Velde, followed quickly by Lehman and Sutton. Mickelson and Sandelin previously had a history with each other, stemming from the 1996 Alfred Dunhill Cup. Sandelin drew the ire of the American fans, who were well aware of the incident, which led to a strange exchange at the second hole. Sandelin missed a short putt for birdie, for which the crowd cheered, prompting Sandelin to raise his hands in mock acknowledgement of the cheering. He never looked comfortable and lost to Mickelson 4 & 3. Jesper Parnevik, separated from García, looked out of sorts, losing six of the first eight holes against David Duval, and lost by a five-hole margin. Woods then closed out Coltart to give the U.S. a 12–10 lead, their first lead of the week.

The Americans had won the first six matches of the day. Pádraig Harrington got the Europeans their first point of the day when his opponent Mark O'Meara could not escape a bunker at the final hole. Steve Pate answered by defeating Miguel Ángel Jiménez. The biggest European win came from the anchor match, with Paul Lawrie winning three of the first eight holes against Jeff Maggert, and going on to win 4 & 3. However, Sergio García lost by the same margin to Jim Furyk, his first loss of the week. Both Parnevik and García lost by large margins in singles after going undefeated in team play.

The Americans now led 14–12, with two matches on the course. The U.S. now needed just half a point to win, while Europe needed two points to retain the cup in a tie situation. The remaining matches pitted Colin Montgomerie against Payne Stewart, and José María Olazábal against Justin Leonard. Montgomerie and Stewart had gone back and forth for much of the front nine, with both players making several long putts. Montgomerie then won the 12th to move 2 up. Stewart won the 14th, while both players found trouble at 15, and both faced lengthy par putts. Montgomerie missed from 15 feet, while Stewart holed from 35 feet to square the match with three holes to play. Stewart's excited fist pump has been used on many Ryder Cup promotional materials, including NBC's telecast opens, since his death a month later.

Meanwhile, the other match appeared to be a blowout with Olazábal leading Leonard 4 up with just seven holes to play. However, the Spaniard played the next three holes in 5–6–5, losing all three, to drop his lead to one hole. Leonard then sunk a 40-foot putt at the 15th to square the match, a scene very similar to Stewart's putt at the same green. At the 17th, Leonard had another 40 footer for birdie, with Olazábal about 15 feet closer. Leonard holed the unlikely birdie, sending the American team into a frenzy. The team, their wives and NBC cameramen all ran onto the green to hug Leonard, with the cameramen allegedly stepping in Olazábal's line which is considered a breach of golf etiquette. Eventually order was restored, and Olazábal had a 25-foot putt to keep Europe's hope alive. He missed the putt which gave Leonard a 1 up lead with 1 hole to play. This guaranteed the U.S. the half-point they needed to win the Ryder Cup and complete the improbable comeback. Olazábal managed to win the 18th hole with a birdie and the match was halved.

With the crowd in a frenzy and the result already decided, Stewart conceded the putt Montgomerie had to win on the 18th, in a gesture of sportsmanship to Montgomerie. This made the final score 14 1/2–13 1/2 officially with the United States winning.

	Results		Timetable
Lee Westwood	(United States) 3 & 2	Tom Lehman	2nd (10–8)
Darren Clarke	(United States) 4 & 2	Hal Sutton	4th (10–10)
Jarmo Sandelin	(United States) 5 & 3	Phil Mickelson	3rd (10–9)
Jean van de Velde	(United States) 6 & 5	Davis Love III	1st (10–7)
Andrew Coltart	(United States) 3 & 2	Tiger Woods	6th (10–12)
Jesper Parnevik	(United States) 5 & 4	David Duval	5th (10–11)
Pádraig Harrington	(Europe) 1 up	Mark O'Meara	8th (11–13)
Miguel Ángel Jiménez	(United States) 2 & 1	Steve Pate	7th (10–13)
José María Olazábal	halved	Justin Leonard	11th (12 1/2–14 1/2)
Colin Montgomerie	(Europe) 1 up	Payne Stewart	12th (13 1/2–14 1/2)
Sergio García	(United States) 4 & 3	Jim Furyk	10th (12–14)
Paul Lawrie	(Europe) 4 & 3	Jeff Maggert	9th (12–13)
3 1/2	Session	8 1/2
13 1/2	Overall	14 1/2

== Aftermath ==
Several members of the European team were critical of the actions of the U.S. team and fans. Colin Montgomerie said that his father had left the course due to the amount of abuse that Montgomerie was receiving, and Mark James reported that a fan had spat at his wife. Andrew Coltart's caddy claimed that a course marshal had concealed Coltart's lost ball until five minutes had elapsed, resulting in a one-stroke penalty for Coltart. Vice-captain Sam Torrance stated that many of those who had run onto the green had done so over Olazábal's putting line, and further singled out Tom Lehman's behavior on the final day as "disgusting" for someone who "calls himself a man of God".

Some of the American players afterwards apologized for the behavior of their team. American newspapers were also critical of their side: The Washington Post stated that "It seems an American team can't get through an international competition without acting like jackasses at some point" and the Los Angeles Times described the American team as having "violated every principle of proper golf decorum and decent manners."

== Individual player records ==
Each entry refers to the win–loss–half record of the player.

=== United States ===
Player	Points	Overall	Singles	Foursomes	Fourballs
David Duval	1.5	1–2–1	1–0–0	0–1–0	0–1–1
Jim Furyk	1	1–2–0	1–0–0	0–1–0	0–1–0
Tom Lehman	2	2–1–0	1–0–0	0–1–0	1–0–0
Justin Leonard	1.5	0–1–3	0–0–1	0–1–0	0–0–2
Davis Love III	2.5	1–0–3	1–0–0	0–0–1	0–0–2
Jeff Maggert	2	2–2–0	0–1–0	2–0–0	0–1–0
Phil Mickelson	2	2–2–0	1–0–0	0–1–0	1–1–0
Mark O'Meara	0	0–2–0	0–1–0	0–1–0	0–0–0
Steve Pate	2	2–1–0	1–0–0	1–0–0	0–1–0
Payne Stewart	0.5	0–2–1	0–1–0	0–1–1	0–0–0
Hal Sutton	3.5	3–1–1	1–0–0	2–0–0	0–1–1
Tiger Woods	2	2–3–0	1–0–0	1–1–0	0–2–0

=== Europe ===
Player	Points	Overall	Singles	Foursomes	Fourballs
Darren Clarke	2	2–3–0	0–1–0	1–1–0	1–1–0
Andrew Coltart	0	0–1–0	0–1–0	0–0–0	0–0–0
Sergio García	3.5	3–1–1	0–1–0	2–0–0	1–0–1
Pádraig Harrington	1.5	1–1–1	1–0–0	0–1–1	0–0–0
Miguel Ángel Jiménez	2	1–2–2	0–1–0	0–1–1	1–0–1
Paul Lawrie	3.5	3–1–1	1–0–0	1–1–0	1–0–1
Colin Montgomerie	3.5	3–1–1	1–0–0	1–1–0	1–0–1
José María Olazábal	2	1–0–2	0–0–1	0–0–0	1–0–1
Jesper Parnevik	3.5	3–1–1	0–1–0	2–0–0	1–0–1
Jarmo Sandelin	0	0–1–0	0–1–0	0–0–0	0–0–0
Jean van de Velde	0	0–1–0	0–1–0	0–0–0	0–0–0
Lee Westwood	2	2–3–0	0–1–0	1–1–0	1–1–0
