= 2008 Ryder Cup =

Team golf match

37th Ryder Cup Matches
- Dates: September 19–21, 2008
- Venue: Valhalla Golf Club
- Location: Louisville, Kentucky
- Captains: Paul Azinger (USA); Nick Faldo (Europe)
(United States)	16 1/2	11 1/2	(Europe)
- United States wins the Ryder Cup

Location map
- Location within Kentucky

The 37th Ryder Cup Matches were held September 19–21, 2008, in the United States at Valhalla Golf Club in Louisville, Kentucky. Team USA won 16 1/2 – 11 1/2 to end the streak of three successive victories for Europe. This was USA's largest margin of victory since 1981 and the first time since 1979 that the Americans had held the lead after every session of play. The team captains were Paul Azinger for the US and Nick Faldo for Europe.

The U.S. team had been in the lead since the contest began on the Friday. Europe was two points behind going into the Sunday singles matches. They had only previously overturned a deficit once before, in 1995. America won the majority of the first matches out and subsequently Jim Furyk defeated Miguel Ángel Jiménez 2 & 1 to win his match and win the Ryder Cup for the USA. Other matches still out on the course would see this margin of victory increase further. Following the defeat Nick Faldo was heavily criticised for his decision to "bottom load" his best players in the singles when the Americans only needed 5 1/2 points to win which they got before the best Europeans could have any effect on the overall outcome.

== Television ==
All matches were covered live in the United States. ESPN handled Friday coverage. Mike Tirico and Andy North hosted from the 18th tower, with Curtis Strange calling holes, and on-course reporters Billy Kratzert and Judy Rankin. With Azinger, ESPN's lead analyst, captaining the U.S. team, North was moved to the booth to fill Azinger's seat. NBC Sports covered the weekend action, with Dan Hicks and Johnny Miller hosting from the 18th tower, Gary Koch and Bob Murphy calling holes, and on-course reporters Mark Rolfing, Roger Maltbie, and Dottie Pepper.

== Format ==
The Ryder Cup is a match play event, with each match worth one point. The competition format used in 2008 was:

- Day 1 (Friday)—four foursomes (alternate shot) matches in the morning session and four fourball (better ball) matches in the afternoon
- Day 2 (Saturday)—four foursome matches in the morning and four fourball matches in the afternoon
- Day 3 (Sunday)—12 singles matches

With a total of 28 points available, 14 1/2 points were required to win the cup, and 14 points for the defending champion to retain it. All matches were played over a maximum 18 holes.

For the first time since 1995, the opening matches featured foursomes. US captain Paul Azinger chose the format, hoping to give his team an early advantage in Kentucky. Foursomes was used in the first sessions of every event since 1981 until European captain Seve Ballesteros opened with better ball (fourball) in 1997 at Valderrama.

== Team qualification and selection ==
=== United States ===
The selection process was radically changed for 2008. The United States team consisted of:

- The top eight players on the Ryder Cup Points List
  - Points gained from money earned in majors in 2007 and official PGA tour events in 2008 up to August 10 (i.e. up to and including money earned at the 2008 PGA Championship). Money earned in 2008 majors counted double and money earned in 2008 events played opposite the majors or World Golf Championships counted half. The new points system was only announced in November 2006 after the previous system had started. Under the previous system players earned points from August 27, 2006, when they finished in the top 10 in official events. Because of the late change to the qualification rules, players who had finished in the top 10 during the period from August 27 to November 5, 2006, were awarded a quarter of a point for every $1,000 earned.
- Four captain's picks

=== Europe ===
The qualification process was the same as in 2006. The European team consisted of:

- The top five players on the Ryder Cup World Points List
  - Total points earned in Official World Golf Ranking events from 6 September 2007 to 25 August 2008 and then only in the Johnnie Walker Championship at Gleneagles, which ended on August 31.
- The five players, not qualified above, on the Ryder Cup European Points List
  - Money earned in official European Tour events from 6 September 2007 to 31 August 2008
- Two captain's picks

The final line-up for the European team was announced after the Johnnie Walker Championship at Gleneagles on August 31, 2008. Søren Hansen, Oliver Wilson and Justin Rose were the last three automatic qualifiers after successful tournaments. Nick Faldo handed wildcards to Paul Casey and Ian Poulter.

== Teams ==
=== Captains ===
The team captains were Paul Azinger for the US and Nick Faldo for Europe.

=== Vice-captains ===
The USA vice-captains were Olin Browne, Raymond Floyd and Dave Stockton.

The only European vice-captain was José María Olazábal. Paul McGinley had been announced as a vice-captain in May 2007 but resigned in September 2007.

=== Players ===
Team USA
Name	Age	Residence	Points rank	World ranking	Previous Ryder Cups	Matches	W–L–H	Winning percentage
Phil Mickelson	38	Rancho Santa Fe, California	2	2	6	25	9–12–4	44.00
Stewart Cink	35	Duluth, Georgia	3	11	3	12	3–5–4	41.67
Kenny Perry	48	Franklin, Kentucky	4	20	1	2	0–2–0	0.00
Jim Furyk	38	Ponte Vedra Beach, Florida	5	9	5	20	6–12–2	35.00
Anthony Kim	23	Dallas, Texas	6	10	0	Rookie
Justin Leonard	36	Dallas, Texas	7	23	2	8	0–3–5	31.25
Ben Curtis	31	Stow, Ohio	8	30	0	Rookie
Boo Weekley	35	Jay, Florida	9	35	0	Rookie
Steve Stricker	41	Madison, Wisconsin	10	8	0	Rookie
Hunter Mahan	26	Plano, Texas	13	36	0	Rookie
J. B. Holmes	26	Campbellsville, Kentucky	18	56	0	Rookie
Chad Campbell	34	Colleyville, Texas	21	57	2	6	1–3–2	33.33

Tiger Woods was the leading player on the points list but was recovering from knee surgery and unable to compete. Captains picks are shown in yellow; the world rankings and records are at the start of the 2008 Ryder Cup.

Team Europe
Name	Age	Residence	Points rank (World)	Points rank (European)	World ranking	Previous Ryder Cups	Matches	W–L–H	Winning percentage
(Republic of Ireland) Pádraig Harrington	37	Dublin, Ireland	1	1	4	4	17	7–8–2	47.06
(Spain) Sergio García	28	Borriol, Spain	2	14	5	4	20	14–4–2	75.00
(England) Lee Westwood	35	Worksop, England	3	2	12	5	25	14–8–3	62.00
(Sweden) Henrik Stenson	32	Gothenburg, Sweden	4	5	7	1	3	1–1–1	50.00
(Sweden) Robert Karlsson	39	Monte Carlo, Monaco	5	3	17	1	3	0–1–2	33.33
(Spain) Miguel Ángel Jiménez	44	Málaga, Spain	6	4	19	2	9	2–5–2	33.33
(Northern Ireland) Graeme McDowell	29	Portrush, Northern Ireland	9	6	32	0	Rookie
(England) Justin Rose	28	London, England	7	7	13	0	Rookie
(Denmark) Søren Hansen	34	Copenhagen, Denmark	13	8	42	0	Rookie
(England) Oliver Wilson	28	Weybridge, England	15	9	48	0	Rookie
(England) Ian Poulter	32	Milton Keynes, England	8	12	29	1	2	1–1–0	50.00
(England) Paul Casey	31	Esher, England	16	18	38	2	6	3–1–2	66.67

Captains picks are shown in yellow; the world rankings and records are at the start of the 2008 Ryder Cup.

== Friday's matches ==
=== Morning foursomes ===
The morning foursomes began well for Team Europe, as they took the lead in all four matches within the first hour. However, things changed by the end of the morning, with Team USA ending the session up 3–1, marking the first time since the last American win in 1999 that Team USA held the lead at the end of any Ryder Cup session.

	Results
Harrington/Karlsson	halved	Mickelson/Kim
Stenson/Casey	(United States) 3 & 2	Leonard/Mahan
Rose/Poulter	(United States) 1 up	Cink/Campbell
Westwood/García	halved	Perry/Furyk
1	Session	3
1	Overall	3

=== Afternoon four-ball ===
The afternoon session was almost a replay of the morning session. Team Europe led after the front nine in three of the four matches, but only won one. Team USA ended up with its largest lead after the first day since Europe was first included in the Ryder Cup in 1979.

	Results
Harrington/McDowell	(United States) 2 up	Mickelson/Kim
Poulter/Rose	(Europe) 4 & 2	Stricker/Curtis
García/Jiménez	(United States) 4 & 3	Leonard/Mahan
Westwood/Hansen	halved	Holmes/Weekley
1 1/2	Session	2 1/2
2 1/2	Overall	5 1/2

== Saturday's matches ==
=== Morning foursomes ===
	Results
Poulter/Rose	(Europe) 4 & 3	Cink/Campbell
Jiménez/McDowell	halved	Leonard/Mahan
Stenson/Wilson	(Europe) 2 & 1	Mickelson/Kim
Harrington/Karlsson	(United States) 3 & 1	Furyk/Perry
2 1/2	Session	1 1/2
5	Overall	7

=== Afternoon four-ball ===
	Results
Westwood/Hansen	(United States) 2 & 1	Weekley/Holmes
García/Casey	halved	Curtis/Stricker
Poulter/McDowell	(Europe) 1 up	Perry/Furyk
Stenson/Karlsson	halved	Mickelson/Mahan
2	Session	2
7	Overall	9

== Sunday's singles matches ==
	Results
Sergio García	(United States) 5 & 4	Anthony Kim
Paul Casey	halved	Hunter Mahan
Robert Karlsson	(Europe) 5 & 3	Justin Leonard
Justin Rose	(Europe) 3 & 2	Phil Mickelson
Henrik Stenson	(United States) 3 & 2	Kenny Perry
Oliver Wilson	(United States) 4 & 2	Boo Weekley
Søren Hansen	(United States) 2 & 1	J. B. Holmes
Miguel Ángel Jiménez	(United States) 2 & 1	Jim Furyk
Graeme McDowell	(Europe) 2 & 1	Stewart Cink
Ian Poulter	(Europe) 3 & 2	Steve Stricker
Lee Westwood	(United States) 2 & 1	Ben Curtis
Pádraig Harrington	(United States) 2 & 1	Chad Campbell
4 1/2	Session	7 1/2
11 1/2	Overall	16 1/2

== Individual player records ==
Each entry refers to the win–loss–half record of the player.

=== United States ===
Player	Points	Overall	Singles	Foursomes	Fourballs
Chad Campbell	2	2–1–0	1–0–0	1–1–0	0–0–0
Stewart Cink	1	1–2–0	0–1–0	1–1–0	0–0–0
Ben Curtis	1.5	1–1–1	1–0–0	0–0–0	0–1–1
Jim Furyk	2.5	2–1–1	1–0–0	1–0–1	0–1–0
J. B. Holmes	2.5	2–0–1	1–0–0	0–0–0	1–0–1
Anthony Kim	2.5	2–1–1	1–0–0	0–1–1	1–0–0
Justin Leonard	2.5	2–1–1	0–1–0	1–0–1	1–0–0
Hunter Mahan	3.5	2–0–3	0–0–1	1–0–1	1–0–1
Phil Mickelson	2	1–2–2	0–1–0	0–1–1	1–0–1
Kenny Perry	2.5	2–1–1	1–0–0	1–0–1	0–1–0
Steve Stricker	0.5	0–2–1	0–1–0	0–0–0	0–1–1
Boo Weekley	2.5	2–0–1	1–0–0	0–0–0	1–0–1

=== Europe ===
Player	Points	Overall	Singles	Foursomes	Fourballs
Paul Casey	1	0–1–2	0–0–1	0–1–0	0–0–1
Sergio García	1	0–2–2	0–1–0	0–0–1	0–1–1
Søren Hansen	0.5	0–2–1	0–1–0	0–0–0	0–1–1
Pádraig Harrington	0.5	0–3–1	0–1–0	0–1–1	0–1–0
Miguel Ángel Jiménez	0.5	0–2–1	0–1–0	0–0–1	0–1–0
Robert Karlsson	2	1–1–2	1–0–0	0–1–1	0–0–1
Graeme McDowell	2.5	2–1–1	1–0–0	0–0–1	1–1–0
Ian Poulter	4	4–1–0	1–0–0	1–1–0	2–0–0
Justin Rose	3	3–1–0	1–0–0	1–1–0	1–0–0
Henrik Stenson	1.5	1–2–1	0–1–0	1–1–0	0–0–1
Lee Westwood	1	0–2–2	0–1–0	0–0–1	0–1–1
Oliver Wilson	1	1–1–0	0–1–0	1–0–0	0–0–0
