= 2002 Ryder Cup =

34th edition; golf tournament in England

34th Ryder Cup Matches
- Dates: 27–29 September 2002
- Venue: The Belfry, Brabazon Course
- Location: Wishaw, Warwickshire, England
- Captains: Sam Torrance (Europe); Curtis Strange (USA)
(Europe)	15 1/2	12 1/2	(United States)
- Europe wins the Ryder Cup

Location map
- Location within England

The 34th Ryder Cup was held 27–29 September 2002 in England, on the Brabazon Course at The Belfry in Wishaw, Warwickshire (near Sutton Coldfield).

The European team won the competition by a margin of 15 1/2 to 12 1/2, the largest margin of victory in the Ryder Cup since the European team won 16 1/2 to 11 1/2 in 1985, also played at The Belfry. Both teams were tied at 8 points going into the Sunday singles matches. Sam Torrance had put most of his best players out early while Curtis Strange had opted to do the opposite. Momentum swung for Europe and after Phillip Price defeated Phil Mickelson 3 & 2, Europe needed 1/2 point for victory. The decisive 1/2 point was secured by Paul McGinley in his match against Jim Furyk after he holed a 10-foot par putt on the 18th hole.

The victory prompted Tony Blair, then British Prime Minister to joke in his speech at the following week's Labour Party conference: "What about the Ryder Cup, eh? Britain in Europe at its best. Me and George Bush on opposite sides".

The event was originally scheduled for 28–30 September 2001 but was postponed for a year on 16 September following the September 11 attacks. "The PGA of America has informed the European Ryder Cup Board that the scope of the last Tuesday's tragedy is so overwhelming that it would not be possible for the United States Ryder Cup team and officials to attend the match this month." The manager of Phil Mickelson and Mark Calcavecchia had earlier announced that the two players would not travel to Europe. Other American players were said to be concerned about attending the event. It was agreed that the same captains and players would participate in the 2002 event.

It was later decided to thereafter play matches in even-numbered years instead of odd-numbered, shifting the already-scheduled 2003, 2005, 2007, 2009, 2011, and 2013 editions to 2004, 2006, 2008, 2010, 2012, and 2014, respectively. This in turn caused a corresponding change in schedules for the Presidents Cup, Solheim Cup, and Seve Trophy (all of which are played in years the Ryder Cup is not played). The Presidents Cup was in turn delayed by a year, while both the Solheim Cup and Seve Trophy played their 2002 matches as scheduled then subsequently started playing in odd-numbered years in 2003. The Junior Ryder Cup, which was also scheduled for 2001, was rescheduled for 2002. In a case of anachronism, the display boards at The Belfry still read "The 2001 Ryder Cup", and U.S. captain Curtis Strange deliberately referred to his team as "The 2001 Ryder Cup Team" in his speech at the closing ceremony. These changes would be reverted by the COVID-19 pandemic, which postponed the 2020 Ryder Cup to 2021.

This was the second of seven consecutive victories at home by Europe, a streak that remains intact through 2023.

== Television ==
Domestic television coverage was provided by BBC and Sky Sports.

In the United States, coverage of the first day was presented on tape-delay by USA Network, but was recorded live. Bill Macatee and Peter Kostis hosted from the 18th tower. On the weekend, NBC Sports presented Saturday's coverage on tape, but recorded live. NBC aired the singles live on Sunday. Dan Hicks and Johnny Miller hosted from the 18th tower, Bob Murphy called holes, while on-course reporters were Gary Koch, Mark Rolfing, Roger Maltbie, and Ed Sneed. To provide a European perspective, NBC used former European team captain Bernard Gallacher and former European team player Nick Faldo as guest analysts. Gallacher had performed the same role for NBC at the previous Ryder Cup in 1999.

== Format ==
The Ryder Cup is a match play event, with each match worth one point. The competition format used from 1991 to 2002 was as follows:

- Day 1 (Friday) — 4 fourball (better ball) matches in a morning session and 4 foursome (alternate shot) matches in an afternoon session
- Day 2 (Saturday) — 4 foursome matches in a morning session and 4 fourball matches in an afternoon session
- Day 3 (Sunday) — 12 singles matches

With a total of 28 points, 14 1/2 points were required to win the Cup, and 14 points were required for the defending champion to retain the Cup. All matches were played to a maximum of 18 holes.

== Teams ==
Team Europe
Name	Age	Points rank	World ranking	Previous Ryder Cups	Matches	W–L–H	Winning percentage
(Scotland) Sam Torrance	49	Non-playing captain
(Northern Ireland) Darren Clarke	34	1	19 (8)	2	7	3–4–0	42.86
(Republic of Ireland) Pádraig Harrington	31	2	79 (12)	1	3	1–1–1	50.00
(Denmark) Thomas Bjørn	31	3	35 (17)	1	2	1–0–1	75.00
(Scotland) Colin Montgomerie	39	4	17 (11)	5	23	12–7–4	60.87
(Sweden) Pierre Fulke	31	5	88 (47)	0	Rookie
(England) Lee Westwood	29	6	148 (20)	2	10	4–6–0	40.00
(Republic of Ireland) Paul McGinley	35	7	71 (39)	0	Rookie
(Sweden) Niclas Fasth	30	8	32 (33)	0	Rookie
(Germany) Bernhard Langer	45	9	27 (21)	9	38	18–15–5	53.95
(Wales) Phillip Price	35	10	119 (51)	0	Rookie
(Spain) Sergio García	22	18	5 (7)	1	5	3–1–1	70.00
(Sweden) Jesper Parnevik	37	31	61 (25)	2	9	4–2–3	61.11

Captains picks are shown in yellow; the world rankings and records are at the start of the 2002 Ryder Cup. The numbers in brackets are the world rankings in 2001 when the Ryder Cup was originally scheduled.

As vice-captains, the European captain Sam Torrance selected Joakim Haeggman, Mark James and Ian Woosnam, to assist him during the tournament.

Team USA
Name	Age	Points rank	World ranking	Previous Ryder Cups	Matches	W–L–H	Winning percentage
Curtis Strange	47	Non-playing captain
Tiger Woods	26	1	1 (1)	2	10	3–6–1	35.00
Phil Mickelson	32	2	2 (2)	3	11	6–3–2	63.64
David Duval	30	3	12 (3)	1	4	1–2–1	37.50
Mark Calcavecchia	42	4	42 (18)	3	11	5–5–1	50.00
David Toms	35	5	6 (9)	0	Rookie
Davis Love III	38	6	7 (6)	4	17	6–8–3	44.12
Scott Hoch	46	7	30 (15)	1	3	2–0–1	83.33
Jim Furyk	32	8	10 (10)	2	6	2–4–0	33.33
Hal Sutton	44	9	125 (27)	3	14	6–4–4	57.14
Stewart Cink	29	10	59 (30)	0	Rookie
Scott Verplank	38	14	28 (14)	0	Rookie
Paul Azinger	42	22	51 (19)	3	14	5–7–2	42.86

Captains picks are shown in yellow; the world rankings and records are at the start of the 2002 Ryder Cup. The numbers in brackets are the world rankings in 2001 when the Ryder Cup was originally scheduled.

As vice-captain, the United States captain Curtis Strange selected Mike Hulbert, to assist him during the tournament

This was the first Ryder Cup in which U.S. citizens born outside the country were eligible for selection on Team USA. More specifically, two categories of U.S. citizens became eligible:

- Individuals born outside the country who received U.S. citizenship at birth.
- Naturalized U.S. citizens, if they acquired citizenship before turning 18. Although not explicitly in the rules, this presumably includes those who obtain citizenship by operation of the Child Citizenship Act of 2000, who do not undergo a naturalization process.

However, this change has yet to have any effect; all Team USA players through the 2018 Ryder Cup have been born in the country.

== Friday's matches ==
=== Morning four-ball ===
	Results
Clarke/Bjørn	(Europe) 1 up	Woods/Azinger
García/Westwood	(Europe) 4 & 3	Duval/Love III
Montgomerie/Langer	(Europe) 4 & 3	Hoch/Furyk
Harrington/Fasth	(United States) 1 up	Mickelson/Toms
3	Session	1
3	Overall	1

=== Afternoon foursomes ===
	Results
Clarke/Bjørn	(United States) 2 & 1	Sutton/Verplank
García/Westwood	(Europe) 2 & 1	Woods/Calcavecchia
Montgomerie/Langer	halved	Mickelson/Toms
Harrington/McGinley	(United States) 3 & 2	Cink/Furyk
1 1/2	Session	2 1/2
4 1/2	Overall	3 1/2

== Saturday's matches ==
=== Morning foursomes ===
	Results
Fulke/Price	(United States) 2 & 1	Mickelson/Toms
Westwood/García	(Europe) 2 & 1	Cink/Furyk
Montgomerie/Langer	(Europe) 1 up	Verplank/Hoch
Clarke/Bjørn	(United States) 4 & 3	Woods/Love III
2	Session	2
6 1/2	Overall	5 1/2

=== Afternoon four-ball ===
	Results
Fasth/Parnevik	(United States) 1 up	Calcavecchia/Duval
Montgomerie/Harrington	(Europe) 2 & 1	Mickelson/Toms
García/Westwood	(United States) 1 up	Woods/Love III
Clarke/McGinley	halved	Hoch/Furyk
1 1/2	Session	2 1/2
8	Overall	8

== Sunday's singles matches ==
	Results
Colin Montgomerie	(Europe) 5 & 4	Scott Hoch
Sergio García	(United States) 1 up	David Toms
Darren Clarke	halved	David Duval
Bernhard Langer	(Europe) 4 & 3	Hal Sutton
Pádraig Harrington	(Europe) 5 & 4	Mark Calcavecchia
Thomas Bjørn	(Europe) 2 & 1	Stewart Cink
Lee Westwood	(United States) 2 & 1	Scott Verplank
Niclas Fasth	halved	Paul Azinger
Paul McGinley	halved	Jim Furyk
Pierre Fulke	halved	Davis Love III
Phillip Price	(Europe) 3 & 2	Phil Mickelson
Jesper Parnevik	halved	Tiger Woods
7 1/2	Session	4 1/2
15 1/2	Overall	12 1/2

== Individual player records ==
Each entry refers to the win–loss–half record of the player.

=== Europe ===
Player	Points	Overall	Singles	Foursomes	Fourballs
Thomas Bjørn	2	2–2–0	1–0–0	0–2–0	1–0–0
Darren Clarke	2	1–2–2	0–0–1	0–2–0	1–0–1
Niclas Fasth	0.5	0–2–1	0–0–1	0–0–0	0–2–0
Pierre Fulke	0.5	0–1–1	0–0–1	0–1–0	0–0–0
Sergio García	3	3–2–0	0–1–0	2–0–0	1–1–0
Pádraig Harrington	2	2–2–0	1–0–0	0–1–0	1–1–0
Bernhard Langer	3.5	3–0–1	1–0–0	1–0–1	1–0–0
Paul McGinley	1	0–1–2	0–0–1	0–1–0	0–0–1
Colin Montgomerie	4.5	4–0–1	1–0–0	1–0–1	2–0–0
Jesper Parnevik	0.5	0–1–1	0–0–1	0–0–0	0–1–0
Phillip Price	1	1–1–0	1–0–0	0–1–0	0–0–0
Lee Westwood	3	3–2–0	0–1–0	2–0–0	1–1–0

=== United States ===
Player	Points	Overall	Singles	Foursomes	Fourballs
Paul Azinger	0.5	0–1–1	0–0–1	0–0–0	0–1–0
Mark Calcavecchia	1	1–2–0	0–1–0	0–1–0	1–0–0
Stewart Cink	1	1–2–0	0–1–0	1–1–0	0–0–0
David Duval	1.5	1–1–1	0–0–1	0–0–0	1–1–0
Jim Furyk	2	1–2–2	0–0–1	1–1–0	0–1–1
Scott Hoch	0.5	0–3–1	0–1–0	0–1–0	0–1–1
Davis Love III	2.5	2–1–1	0–0–1	1–0–0	1–1–0
Phil Mickelson	2.5	2–2–1	0–1–0	1–0–1	1–1–0
Hal Sutton	1	1–1–0	0–1–0	1–0–0	0–0–0
David Toms	3.5	3–1–1	1–0–0	1–0–1	1–1–0
Scott Verplank	2	2–1–0	1–0–0	1–1–0	0–0–0
Tiger Woods	2.5	2–2–1	0–0–1	1–1–0	1–1–0
