= 2004 in golf =

This article summarizes the highlights of professional and amateur golf in the year 2004.

== Men's professional golf ==
=== Major championships ===
- 8–11 April: The Masters – Phil Mickelson won the first major of his career
- 17–20 June: U.S. Open – Retief Goosen won the second major (and U.S. Open) of his career
- 15–18 July: The Open Championship – Todd Hamilton was the surprise winner at Royal Troon after a four-hole playoff with Ernie Els
- 12–15 August: PGA Championship – Vijay Singh won following a three-hole playoff with Chris DiMarco and Justin Leonard

=== World Golf Championships ===
- 26–29 February: WGC-Accenture Match Play Championship – Tiger Woods defeated Davis Love III in the final to defend the title
- 19–22 August: WGC-NEC Invitational – Stewart Cink claimed his first WGC title with a four stroke victory
- 30 September – 3 October: WGC-American Express Championship – Ernie Els won his first WGC title by a stroke from Thomas Bjørn
- 18–21 November: WGC-World Cup – England's team of Paul Casey and Luke Donald won by a stroke over home favorites Spain

=== Team events ===
- 17–19 September: Ryder Cup – Team Europe defeated Team USA 18 1/2–9 1/2 to retain the trophy

=== Money-list/order of merit winners ===
- PGA Tour: Vijay Singh
- European Tour: Ernie Els
- Japan Golf Tour: Shingo Katayama
- Asian Tour: Thongchai Jaidee
- PGA Tour of Australasia Tour: Richard Green

=== Awards ===
- PGA Tour
  - PGA Tour Player of the Year: Vijay Singh
  - PGA Tour leading money winner: Vijay Singh wins a record $10,905,166
  - PGA Tour rookie of the year: Todd Hamilton
- European Tour
  - European Tour Golfer of the Year: Vijay Singh
  - Sir Henry Cotton Rookie of the Year: Scott Drummond

== Summary of events ==
- January 15–16 – At the age of 14, golf prodigy Michelle Wie becomes the youngest woman (and only the fourth overall) to play at a PGA Tour event, shooting 72-68 (even par) at the Sony Open in Hawaii at Waialae Country Club in her hometown of Honolulu. She missed the cut by one stroke.
- January 25 – Phil Mickelson wins for the first time in 19 months, beating Skip Kendall on the first extra hole at the Bob Hope Chrysler Classic.
- February 8 – Vijay Singh claims his first victory of 2004 at the AT&T Pebble Beach National Pro-Am.
- February 15 – John Daly ends an eight-year winless drought by beating Chris Riley and Luke Donald in the Buick Invitational.
- February 29 – Tiger Woods defeats Davis Love III to win the WGC-Accenture Match Play Championship for a record second year in a row
- February 29 – Annika Sörenstam wins her third ANZ Ladies Masters.
- March 28 – Grace Park wins the first major of the LPGA season, the Kraft Nabisco Championship, by one shot over 17-year-old Aree Song. Michelle Wie finished fourth, four shots behind Park.
- March 28 – Adam Scott wins The Players Championship by one shot over Pádraig Harrington. Scott is the tournament's youngest winner ever.
- May 9 – Se Ri Pak wins the LPGA Michelob ULTRA Open at Kingsmill, qualifying her for the World Golf Hall of Fame. She will not be eligible for induction, however, until she completes her 10th year on tour in 2007.
- June 13 – Annika Sörenstam successfully defends her title in the second major of the LPGA season, the LPGA Championship.
- June 20 – Retief Goosen captures a second U.S.Open victory, after Phil Mickelson falters over the closing holes at Shinnecock Hills chasing a second successive major.
- July 18 – Todd Hamilton wins The Open at Royal Troon, surprising many by beating Ernie Els in a playoff for the title, from a final-day leaderboard that also included recent major champions Mickelson, Goosen, Woods, and Mike Weir.
- August 15 – Vijay Singh wins the PGA Championship at Whistling Straits in a three-hole playoff with Chris DiMarco and Justin Leonard. Phil Mickelson finishes among the top ten for the fourth time in a major in 2004.
- September 6 – Vijay Singh replaces Tiger Woods at the top of the world rankings, ending Woods' reign of five years and four weeks. Singh, at the age of 41, enjoys his most successful season, winning nine times on the U.S.Tour.
- September 17–19 – Team Europe defeats Team USA 18 1/2–9 1/2 to retain the Ryder Cup. See 2004 Ryder Cup for more details.
