= List of ESPN/ABC golf commentators =

The following is a list of commentators who have worked for ABC Sports golf coverage and Golf on ESPN coverage from 1962 until the present. Golf on both platforms has effectively been presented by the same anchors since ABC's purchase of ESPN in 1984.

== Major events covered ==
=== PGA Tour ===
- Masters Tournament (2008–present on ESPN)
- PGA Championship (1965–1990 on ABC, 1982–1990 and 2020–present on ESPN)
- U.S. Open (1966–1994 on ABC, 1982–2014 on ESPN)
- The Open Championship (1962–2015 on ABC, 1982–2002 and 2010–2015 on ESPN)
- Tour Championship (1991–2006 on ESPN and ABC)

=== LPGA ===
- Kraft Nabisco Championship (1991–2005 on ABC, 1983–2010 on ESPN)
- U.S. Women's Open (1982–2014 on ESPN)
- Women's British Open (2001–2002 and 2010–2015 on ESPN and 2001–2009 on ABC)
- CME Group Tour Championship (2015–2018 on ABC)

=== Champions Tour ===
- The Tradition (1997–2002 on ESPN and ABC)
- U.S. Senior Open (1985–2014 on ESPN)
- Senior Open Championship (2010–2015 on ESPN, 2003–2009 on ABC)
- Senior PGA Championship (1997–2006 on ESPN)
- Senior Players Championship (1990–2002 on ESPN and ABC)
- Senior Tour Championship (1997–2000 on ESPN)

=== Other ===
- Ryder Cup (1975, 1979, 1983, 1987 on ABC, 2008, 2010 and 2012 on ESPN)
- Presidents Cup (1994, 1996, 1998 on ESPN)
- Latin America Amateur Championship (2015–present on ESPN)
- Asia-Pacific Amateur Championship (2013–present on ESPN)

== Play-by-play/host ==
- Matt Barrie (2020–present)
- Chris Berman (1986–2014)
- Joe Buck (2022–present)
- Bill Flemming (1966–1981)
- Dave Flemming (2017–2026)
- Terry Gannon (2003–2012)
- Frank Gifford (1971–1974)
- Keith Jackson (1967–1978)
- Jim Kelly (1994–1998)
- Henry Longhurst (1967–1976)
- Sean McDonough (2010–present)
- Jim McKay (1962–2003)
- Brent Musburger (1992–1996)
- Lou Palmer (1982)
- Chris Schenkel (1965–1976)
- Jim Simpson (1982–1986)
- Al Trautwig (1986–1987)
- Mike Tirico (1997–2015)
- Roger Twibell (1989–2004)
- Scott Van Pelt (2010–present)
- Jack Whitaker (1982–1995)
- Bob Wischusen (2010–present)

== Analysts ==
- Peter Alliss (1975–2015)
- Paul Azinger (2006–2015)
- Ian Baker-Finch (1997–2006)
- Billy Ray Brown (1999–2006)
- Ken Brown (2011, 2023–present)
- Olin Browne (2011–2012)
- Brandel Chamblee (2003)
- Jane Crafter (2011–2012)
- Bruce Devlin (1983–1987)
- David Duval (2012–2014, 2020–present)
- Nick Faldo (2005–2007)
- Peter Jacobsen (1993)
- Billy Kratzert (2006–present)
- John Maginnes (2021–present)
- Dave Marr (1970–1991)
- Mark McCumber (1998–1999)
- Rocco Mediate (2010)
- Steve Melnyk (1992–2004)
- Cary Middlecoff (1982)
- Colin Montgomerie (2010)
- Byron Nelson (1966–1976)
- Jack Nicklaus (1986–1995)
- Andy North (1992–present)
- Jerry Pate (1988–1994)
- Dottie Pepper (2013–2017)
- Judy Rankin (1984–2018)
- Mark Rolfing (1992–1997)
- Bob Rosburg (1975–2003)
- Charlie Rymer (1998–2008)
- Marilynn Smith (1973)
- John Schroeder (1980–1984)
- Ed Sneed (1981–1997)
- Curtis Strange (1995–2004, 2008–present)
- Hal Sutton (2004)
- Tom Watson (2008–2011)
- Tom Weiskopf (2009–2012)
- Suzy Whaley (2021–present)
- Note: ESPN+ featured group analysts not included

== Interviews and essays ==
- Michael Eaves (2021–present)
- Wendi Nix (2010)
- Rick Reilly (2010–2015)
- Tom Rinaldi (2006–2020)
- Gary Smith (2000–2002)
- Marty Smith (2021–present)
- Wright Thompson (2006–present)
- Gene Wojciechowski (2010–2023)
