= Chris Riley (golfer) =

American professional golfer and coach (born 1973)

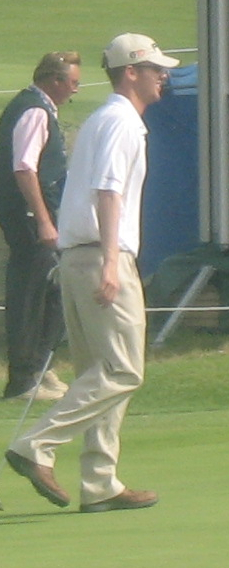
- Riley at the 2007 KLM Open

Personal information
- Full name: Chris J. Riley
- Nationality: United States
- Born: December 8, 1973 (age 52) San Diego, California, U.S.
- Height: 5 ft 11 in (1.80 m)
- Weight: 180 lb (82 kg; 13 st)
- Spouse: Michelle (née Louviere)
- Children: Taylor, Rose

Career
- Sport: Golf
- College: University of Nevada, Las Vegas
- Turned professional: 1996
- Current tour: PGA Tour
- Professional wins: 2
- Highest ranking: 22 (February 29, 2004)

Number of wins by tour
- PGA Tour: 1
- Korn Ferry Tour: 1

Best results in major championships
- Masters Tournament: T23: 2003
- PGA Championship: 3rd: 2002
- U.S. Open: T48: 2004
- The Open Championship: T22: 2002

Chris J. Riley (born December 8, 1973) is an American professional golfer and coach.

== Early life and amateur career ==
Riley was born in San Diego, California.

Riley attended the University of Nevada, Las Vegas where he became the first four-year All-American in any sport. In 1995, he played for the United States in the Walker Cup.

== Professional career ==
In 1996, Riley turned professional and played on the Nike Tour. He became a member of the PGA Tour in 1999 and made the top thirty on the money list in 2002 and 2003. His sole PGA Tour victory came at the 2002 Reno-Tahoe Open. He was a member of the losing 2004 United States Ryder Cup team and also played on a winning American team in that year's Tommy Bahama Challenge, which is an international match for pros aged 30 and under.

After his Ryder Cup appearance, Riley finished outside of the top 125 on the money list in both 2005 and 2006. Riley last played a full PGA Tour season in 2010 and competes occasionally through Monday qualifying and past champion status. In 2007, he won the Rochester Area Charities Showdown at Somerby on the Nationwide Tour located in Byron, Minnesota.

He was ranked as high as 21st in the Official World Golf Ranking.

Riley was named the head men's golf coach at University of San Diego in June 2017.

== Professional wins (2) ==
=== PGA Tour wins (1) ===
No.	Date	Tournament	Winning score	Margin of victory	Runner-up
1	Aug 25, 2002	Reno–Tahoe Open	−17 (71-66-67-67=271)	Playoff	(United States) Jonathan Kaye

PGA Tour playoff record (1–1)

No.	Year	Tournament	Opponent(s)	Result
1	2002	Reno–Tahoe Open	(United States) Jonathan Kaye	Won with par on first extra hole
2	2004	Buick Invitational	(United States) John Daly, (England) Luke Donald	Daly won with birdie on first extra hole

=== Nationwide Tour wins (1) ===
No.	Date	Tournament	Winning score	Margin of victory	Runner-up
1	Jun 17, 2007	Rochester Area Charities Showdown	−16 (67-68-67-70=272)	Playoff	(United States) Jamie Lovemark (a)

Nationwide Tour playoff record (1–0)

No.	Year	Tournament	Opponent	Result
1	2007	Rochester Area Charities Showdown	(United States) Jamie Lovemark (a)	Won with par on second extra hole

== Results in major championships ==
Tournament	1999	2000	2001	2002	2003	2004	2005	2006
Masters Tournament					T23	44	49	
U.S. Open	CUT				CUT	T48		
The Open Championship				T22	CUT	CUT	T67	
PGA Championship			T51	3	CUT	T4	T66	T41

Top 10
Did not play

CUT = missed the half-way cut
"T" = tied

=== Summary ===
Tournament	Wins	2nd	3rd	Top-5	Top-10	Top-25	Events	Cuts made
Masters Tournament	0	0	0	0	0	1	3	3
U.S. Open	0	0	0	0	0	0	3	1
The Open Championship	0	0	0	0	0	1	4	2
PGA Championship	0	0	1	2	2	2	6	5
Totals	0	0	1	2	2	4	16	11

- Most consecutive cuts made – 5 (2004 PGA – 2006 PGA)
- Longest streak of top-10s – 1 (twice)

== Results in The Players Championship ==
Tournament	2000	2001	2002	2003	2004	2005	2006	2007	2008	2009	2010	2011
The Players Championship	T48	T58	T22	CUT	CUT	CUT						CUT

Did not play

CUT = missed the halfway cut
"T" indicates a tie for a place

== Results in World Golf Championships ==
Tournament	2002	2003	2004	2005
Match Play		R32	R64	R64
Championship	T39	T28	T50	
Invitational		T4	T34	T58

Top 10
Did not play

QF, R16, R32, R64 = Round in which player lost in match play
"T" = Tied

== U.S. national team appearances ==
Amateur

- Walker Cup: 1995

Professional

- Ryder Cup: 2004

== See also ==
- 1998 PGA Tour Qualifying School graduates
- 2008 PGA Tour Qualifying School graduates
- 2009 PGA Tour Qualifying School graduates
