= Frys.com Open =

Frys.com Open was the name of two distinct PGA Tour golf tournaments sponsored by Fry's Electronics:

- Shriners Children's Open, played in Las Vegas, known as the Frys.com Open from 2006 to 2007
- Procore Championship, played at various locations in Arizona and California, known as the Frys.com Open from 2008 to 2015
