= Golf on USA =

USA Network television program

Golf on USA is the umbrella title for USA Network's coverage of the PGA Tour and other golf events. in the United States.

USA covered the early rounds of The Masters Tournament from 1982 until 2007. The network also regularly broadcasts the Ryder Cup Matches, regularly from 1989 until 2006, as well as overflow coverage in 2010, returning to regular coverage in 2023.

USA Network covered regular-season PGA Tour events from 1996 through 2006.

From 2022 to 2025, USA returned to golf coverage, airing NBC's early round coverage of The Open Championship, U.S. Open, and their women's counterparts, replacing Golf Channel.

== Coverage overview ==
=== 1980s ===
The USA Network began first and second round Masters coverage in 1982, which was also produced by the CBS production team. This was the first ever cable coverage for one of the golf majors. Initially, the USA Network provided Thursday and Friday coverage for 2 hours live each day along with a prime time replay.

The Shark Shootout, which began in 1989 as the RMCC Invitational, was originally broadcast in the United States by the USA Network and CBS, with USA broadcasting the first round on a tape-delayed basis, and CBS handling the second round live. Not all the country saw the final round live, as CBS' commitment to the NFL only allowed part of the country to see the round as it takes place, with the rest of the U.S. seeing the event beginning at 4 p.m. Eastern Time. In 2007, the event was moved to December, and was broadcast live by both Golf Channel and NBC.

=== 1990s ===
In 1995, USA expanded the Masters Thursday/Friday coverage to 2.5 hours each day.

=== 2000s ===
In early 2006, it was announced that USA was outbid by Golf Channel for its early-round PGA Tour rights, with USA's final season being 2006. After 2006, NBC/Universal (parent company of USA Network) traded away the network's Friday Ryder Cup coverage through 2014 to ESPN for the rights to sign Al Michaels. However, USA did renew its Masters contract for an additional year. USA would televise the 2007 Masters before being outbid by ESPN for future coverage. The 2007 Masters was also the final event for USA Sports, which was dissolved into parent NBC Sports after the tournament. All future sports telecasts on USA would use NBC's graphics and personalities.

In 2003 and 2004, both CBS and USA televised the Masters commercial-free. In 2005, USA increased the Thursday/Friday coverage to 3 hours.

=== 2010s ===
The Ryder Cup contract, which stipulated cable coverage air on USA, was still controlled by NBC even after it granted ESPN the rights to Friday cable coverage (normally the only day of the event covered on cable). However, in 2010, rain on Friday pushed the singles matches to Monday, necessitating that they air on cable. With NBC having granted only Friday rights to ESPN, the singles matches aired on USA. Four months later, NBC merged with Golf Channel, making Golf Channel NBC's primary cable outlet for golf.

=== 2020s ===
In November 2021, it was announced that early-round coverage of the Open Championship, U.S. Open, and their women's counterparts, would move to USA Network beginning in 2022. In 2023, the Ryder Cup was also added to USA’s schedule.

On November 20, 2024, Comcast announced that it will spin off most of its cable networks and selected digital properties into a new publicly traded company, Versant. The spin-off will separate NBC Sports and USA Network, but Golf Channel and USA will remain part of the same company.

On August 12, 2025, Versant announced a broadcasting agreement with United States Golf Association, a first for the company, through 2032. Through the agreement, USA Network will hold the rights to 35 hours of coverage from the U.S. Open and U.S. Women's Open.

In December 2025, USA Network will simulcast Golf Channel's coverage of the Golf Channel Games, a spiritual successor to TNT Sports' former sports entertainment contest The Match. The games will feature two teams captained by Scottie Scheffler and Rory McIlroy.

In July 2026, USA Network will broadcast more commercials than actual coverage of The Open Championship.

== Events covered by USA ==
=== PGA Tour ===
- Bob Hope Chrysler Classic
- Buick Invitational
- FBR Open
- AT&T Pebble Beach National Pro-Am
- Nissan Open
- Chrysler Classic of Tucson
- Ford Championship at Doral
- Honda Classic
- Bay Hill Invitational presented by MasterCard
- BellSouth Classic
- Verizon Heritage
- Shell Houston Open
- Zurich Classic of New Orleans
- Wachovia Championship
- EDS Byron Nelson Championship
- Bank of America Colonial
- FedEx St. Jude Classic
- Barclays Classic
- Booz Allen Classic
- Buick Championship
- Cialis Western Open
- John Deere Classic
- B.C. Open presented by Turning Stone Resort
- U.S. Bank Championship in Milwaukee
- Buick Open
- The INTERNATIONAL
- Deutsche Bank Championship
- Chrysler Classic of Greensboro
- Fry's.com Open
- Chrysler Championship
- Merrill Lynch Shootout
- Target World Challenge

=== Special events ===
- Senior PGA Championship
- Ford Senior Players Championship
- Ryder Cup
- Masters Tournament
- U.S. Open
- U.S. Women's Open
- The Open Championship
- Women's British Open
- Golf Channel Games

== Commentators ==
- Phil Blackmar
- Bob Carpenter - Carpenter anchored USA's coverage of the Masters beginning in 1986.
- Fran Charles - From 2002 to 2006, Charles was the host of the weekly golf show, PGA Tour Sunday on USA Network, serving as lead anchor for studio segments during PGA Tour events.
- John Cook
- Jim Gallagher Jr.
- Mike Hulbert - During the 2003 Buick Open, he interviewed eventual champion Jim Furyk from what appeared to be a snack bar during a rain delay while covering the early rounds on USA Network. Other players (who were not visible, nor identified) were in the room at the time of Furyk's interview and proceeded to throw popcorn at them from off camera as the interview progressed. At one point Furyk even held up a golf towel to block the popcorn as it got worse, and he stated that: "It looks like it's pick on Hubby day!"
- Peter Kostis - In addition to his CBS duties, he was from 1989-2004, the lead golf analyst for the USA Network.
- Bill Macatee - Beginning 1990, he anchored coverage of the PGA Tour on the USA Network.
- Gary McCord
- Jennifer Mills
- Bill Patrick - He worked for USA from 1998 through 2006 as host of the U.S. Open tennis and PGA Tour. He also did play-by-play and reporting for USA's PGA Tour coverage.
- Larry Rinker
- Ted Robinson
- Tim Rosaforte
- Patty Sheehan
- Jim Simpson - Simpson was the lead play-by-play man for USA's coverage of the 1989 Ryder Cup (working alongside Gary McCord and Ben Wright among others).
- Stina Sternberg
- Chris Wragge - In December 2000, while still with NBC Sports and Houston's KPRC, Wragge joined USA Sports as the on-site correspondent for PGA Tour Sunday, the PGA Tour's leading broadcast partner.
- Ben Wright

Preceded by First	Masters Tournament cable television broadcaster 1982-2007	Succeeded by ESPN
