= Peter Kostis =

American golf analyst and instructor

Peter Kostis (born December 23, 1947) is an American golf analyst and instructor.

== Early life and education ==
Kostis was born and raised in Sanford, Maine. He attended Sanford High School. Kostis then attended The University of New Hampshire on a football scholarship. In 1970, he graduated with a BS in Chemical Engineering.

== Career ==
Among his many students are Paul Casey, Chez Reavie, Bernhard Langer, Steve Elkington, Dan Marino, Maury Povich, and Mike Schmidt. He has the Peter Kostis Learning Academy at Grayhawk Golf Club in Scottsdale, Arizona.

In 1992, Kostis joined CBS Sports as an on-course reporter and golf analyst. In addition to his CBS duties, he was the lead golf analyst for the USA Network from 1989 to 2004. Kostis, alongside Gary McCord, was not brought back for the 2020 golf broadcast team for CBS.

== Personal life ==
In the 1980s, Kostis lived in Falmouth, Maine.

== In popular culture ==
Kostis was the instructor who coached Kevin Costner in the film Tin Cup, also appearing as himself in a speaking role.
