= Gary Koch =

American professional golfer (born 1952)

Personal information
- Full name: Gary D. Koch
- Nationality: United States
- Born: November 21, 1952 (age 73) Baton Rouge, Louisiana, U.S.
- Height: 5 ft 11 in (1.80 m)
- Weight: 170 lb (77 kg; 12 st)

Career
- Sport: Golf
- College: University of Florida
- Turned professional: 1975
- Current tour: Champions Tour
- Former tour: PGA Tour
- Professional wins: 10

Number of wins by tour
- PGA Tour: 6

Best results in major championships
- Masters Tournament: T16: 1985, 1986
- PGA Championship: T10: 1979
- U.S. Open: T6: 1982
- The Open Championship: T4: 1988

Achievements and awards
- Payne Stewart Award: 2023

Gary D. Koch (born November 21, 1952) is an American professional golfer, sportscaster and golf course designer, who formerly played on the PGA Tour, Nationwide Tour and Champions Tour.

== Early life ==
Koch was born in Baton Rouge, Louisiana in 1952 and raised in Florida. He won the Florida Open in 1969 as an amateur at the age of 16. He won the U.S. Junior Amateur in 1970. He attended C. Leon King High School in Tampa, Florida. The 1969 King High golf team, which consisted of Koch, Eddie Pearce, Brian Hawke, and Phil Reid, won the Florida high school title setting a scoring record that stood for thirty years.

== Amateur career ==
Koch accepted an athletic scholarship to attend the University of Florida in Gainesville, Florida, where he became a member of Sigma Alpha Epsilon fraternity. (Florida Upsilon chapter). While he was an undergraduate, Koch played for coach Buster Bishop's Florida Gators men's golf team in National Collegiate Athletic Association (NCAA) competition from 1971 to 1974. As a Gator golfer, he was a four-time first-team All-Southeastern Conference (SEC) selection, and a three-time All-American. He was also a member of the Gators teams that won SEC championships in 1973 and 1974 and an NCAA Championship in 1973.

Individually, he was a two-time medalist in the SEC tournament (1973, 1974), and the runner-up behind Ben Crenshaw at the 1973 NCAA championship tournament. His Gators teammates included fellow future PGA Tour professionals Woody Blackburn, Andy Bean, Phil Hancock and Andy North. Koch graduated from Florida with a bachelor's degree in journalism in 1976.

== Professional career ==
Koch turned professional in 1975, and won six events as a professional on the PGA Tour during the 1970s and 1980s. His career year in professional golf came in 1984 when he finished seventeenth on the money list and captured two titles: the Isuzu-Andy Williams San Diego Open and the Bay Hill Classic.

In preparation for play on the Champions Tour, Koch played some on the Nationwide Tour in his late 40s. After turning 50 in November 2002, he began play on the Champions Tour. His best finish in this venue was a tie for second at both the ACE Group Classic and Liberty Mutual Legends of Golf in 2004.

=== Broadcasting career ===
Koch's career as a sportscaster began in 1990 with ESPN working Champions Tour telecasts. Before the end of the decade, he joined NBC Sports. A long-time member of the NBC Sports announcing team (1996–present), he is best known for his "Better than Most" call in the third round of the 2001 Players Championship at the TPC at Sawgrass. Three down from leader Jerry Kelly, Tiger Woods was facing a long, triple-breaking, fringe putt for birdie on the 17th hole's famous Island Green. Koch's call of that putt has gone down as one of the most famous in golf history as it was during the height of Tiger's dominance, on an iconic hole of a well-known course, on the way to an inevitable, yet routine Woods comeback to win the tournament.

Koch also maintains an interest in golf course design and helped design the front nine of "The Forest" course at The Eagles Golf Course in Odessa, Florida.

== Personal life ==
Koch currently resides in Tampa, Florida.

== Awards and honors ==
- In 1978, Koch was inducted into the University of Florida Athletic Hall of Fame as a "Gator Great."
- In 2012, Koch was inducted into the Florida Sports Hall of Fame.
- In 2023, Koch won the Payne Stewart Award.

== Amateur wins ==
this list may be incomplete

- 1970 U.S. Junior Amateur
- 1973 Trans-Mississippi Amateur

== Professional wins (10) ==
=== PGA Tour wins (6) ===
No.	Date	Tournament	Winning score	To par	Margin of victory	Runner(s)-up
1	Apr 18, 1976	Tallahassee Open	71-69-67-70=277	−11	1 stroke	(United States) John Mahaffey
2	Mar 7, 1977	Florida Citrus Open	70-69-65-70=274	−14	2 strokes	(South Africa) Dale Hayes, (United States) Joe Inman
3	Feb 27, 1983	Doral-Eastern Open	69-67-65-70=271	−17	5 strokes	(United States) Ed Fiori
4	Jan 29, 1984	Isuzu-Andy Williams San Diego Open	68-70-69-65=272	−16	Playoff	(United States) Gary Hallberg
5	Mar 18, 1984	Bay Hill Classic (2)	69-68-72-63=272	−12	Playoff	(United States) George Burns
6	May 8, 1988	Panasonic Las Vegas Invitational	68-73-66-67=274 (Note: Shortened to 72 holes due to weather.)	−14	1 stroke	(United States) Peter Jacobsen, (United States) Mark O'Meara

PGA Tour playoff record (2–0)

No.	Year	Tournament	Opponent	Result
1	1984	Isuzu-Andy Williams San Diego Open	(United States) Gary Hallberg	Won with birdie on second extra hole
2	1984	Bay Hill Classic	(United States) George Burns	Won with birdie on second extra hole

=== Other wins (1) ===
- 1969 Florida Open (as an amateur)

=== Senior wins (3) ===
- 2003 Liberty Mutual Legends of Golf – Raphael Division (with Roger Maltbie)
- 2008 Liberty Mutual Legends of Golf – Raphael Division (with Roger Maltbie)
- 2009 Liberty Mutual Legends of Golf – Raphael Division (with Roger Maltbie)

== Playoff record ==
PGA of Japan Tour playoff record (0–1)

No.	Year	Tournament	Opponent	Result
1	1984	Casio World Open	(Scotland) Sandy Lyle	Lost to birdie on first extra hole

Champions Tour playoff record (0–1)

No.	Year	Tournament	Opponents	Result
1	2004	ACE Group Classic	(United States) Craig Stadler, (United States) Tom Watson	Stadler won with birdie on first extra hole

== Results in major championships ==
Tournament	1973	1974	1975	1976	1977	1978	1979
Masters Tournament		CUT	CUT		T42		
U.S. Open	57	CUT			CUT	CUT	
The Open Championship			CUT				
PGA Championship				CUT	CUT	T64	T10

Tournament	1980	1981	1982	1983	1984	1985	1986	1987	1988	1989
Masters Tournament				CUT	T35	T16	T16	T22	T25	CUT
U.S. Open	CUT	CUT	T6	T24	T34	CUT	T15	CUT	CUT	CUT
The Open Championship				T14	T60	T11	T6		T4	T30
PGA Championship	T46			CUT	T54	CUT	66		T31	T61

Tournament	1990	1991	1992	1993	1994	1995	1996	1997	1998	1999	2000	2001
Masters Tournament												
U.S. Open			CUT			CUT						CUT
The Open Championship												
PGA Championship												

Top 10
Did not play

CUT = missed the half-way cut
"T" indicates a tie for a place

=== Summary ===
Tournament	Wins	2nd	3rd	Top-5	Top-10	Top-25	Events	Cuts made
Masters Tournament	0	0	0	0	0	4	10	6
U.S. Open	0	0	0	0	1	3	17	5
The Open Championship	0	0	0	1	2	4	7	6
PGA Championship	0	0	0	0	1	1	11	7
Totals	0	0	0	1	4	12	45	24

- Most consecutive cuts made – 5 (twice)
- Longest streak of top-10s – 1 (four times)

== U.S. national team appearances ==
Amateur

- Walker Cup: 1973 (winners), 1975 (winners)
- Eisenhower Trophy: 1974 (winners)

== See also ==
- Fall 1975 PGA Tour Qualifying School graduates
- List of Florida Gators men's golfers on the PGA Tour
- List of Sigma Alpha Epsilon members
- List of University of Florida alumni
- List of University of Florida Athletic Hall of Fame members
