= Roger Maltbie =

American professional golfer (born 1951)

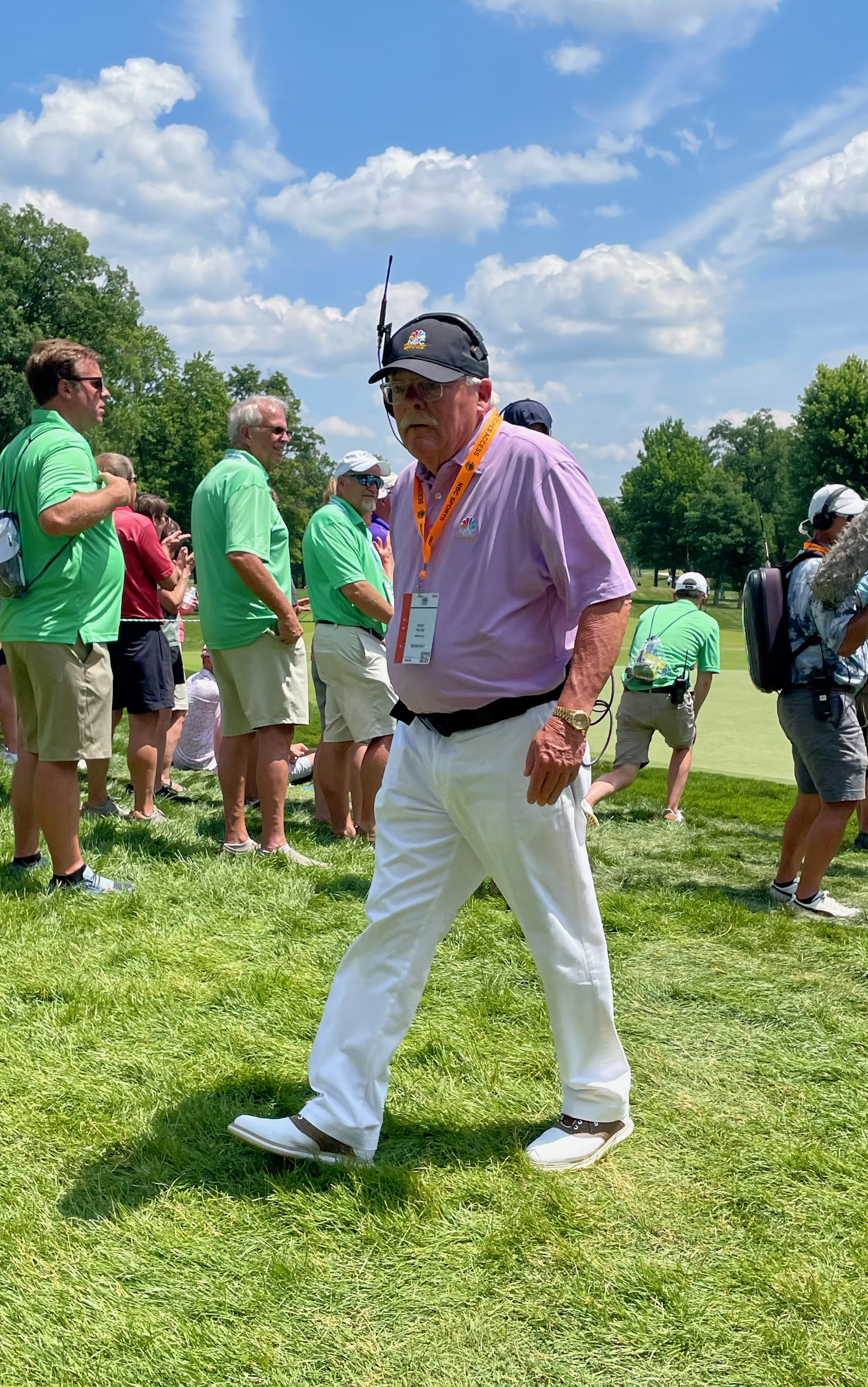
- Maltbie at the 2023 U.S. Senior Open

Personal information
- Full name: Roger Lin Maltbie
- Nationality: United States
- Born: June 30, 1951 (age 75) Modesto, California, U.S.
- Height: 5 ft 10 in (1.78 m)
- Weight: 200 lb (91 kg; 14 st)

Career
- Sport: Golf
- College: San Jose City College; San Jose State University
- Turned professional: 1973
- Former tours: PGA Tour; Champions Tour
- Professional wins: 12

Number of wins by tour
- PGA Tour: 5
- Other: 7

Best results in major championships
- Masters Tournament: T4: 1987
- PGA Championship: T14: 1983
- U.S. Open: T32: 1983
- The Open Championship: T26: 1977

Roger Lin Maltbie (born June 30, 1951) is an American professional golfer and on-course analyst for NBC Sports.

== Early life ==
Maltbie was born in Modesto, California and grew up in San Jose. He attended James Lick High School where he was a teammate of former PGA Tour player Forrest Fezler.

== Amateur career ==
Maltbie attended San Jose City College (1970–1971) and then San Jose State University. He was a member of the golf team at both institutions. He also practiced at San Jose Country Club.

== Professional career ==
Maltbie turned professional in 1973 and joined the PGA Tour in 1974. He played on the Tour full-time from 1975 to 1996. He won five official tour events between 1975 and 1985, including back-to-back wins in his first full year. After his win at the 1975 Pleasant Valley Classic, Maltbie left his $40,000 winner's check behind in a bar.

In his second year on tour, Maltbie won the inaugural Memorial Tournament by defeating Hale Irwin on the fourth hole of a sudden death playoff. On the playoff's third hole, an errant shot by Maltbie seemed headed for the gallery when it hit a stake causing the ball to bounce onto the green instead.

Maltbie had 55 top-10 finishes on the PGA Tour. In 1985, he won two tournaments, earned $360,554, and finished 8th on the money list. His best finish in a major was T4 at the 1987 Masters Tournament. Maltbie calls losing that tournament the biggest disappointment of his career.

Maltbie began play on the Senior PGA Tour after turning 50 in June 2001. His best finish at this level is a 20th at the 2003 Bayer Advantage Celebrity Pro-Am.

=== Broadcasting career ===
Since 1991, Maltbie has worked as an on-course reporter and analyst for NBC Sports. In this role, he has become well known as a jovial good-natured figure. His signature element is a "golf whisper," necessitated by the fact that Maltbie generally stands much closer to the green than other on-course reporters. During the 2002 and 2009 U.S. Opens, both contested at Bethpage State Park on Long Island, NBC ran features in which Maltbie spent a night camping out with several golfers while waiting in the infamous line to play Bethpage's Black Course, the first municipal course to host the U.S. Open.

== Personal life ==
Maltbie and his wife Donna have two sons, Spencer and Parker. They live in Los Gatos, California.

He is a San Francisco 49ers fan and owns several Super Bowl rings given to him by former owner Edward J. DeBartolo, Jr.

== Amateur wins (2) ==
- 1971 Northern California Championship
- 1972 California State Amateur Championship

== Professional wins (12) ==
=== PGA Tour wins (5) ===
No.	Date	Tournament	Winning score	To par	Margin of victory	Runner(s)-up
1	Jul 13, 1975	Ed McMahon-Jaycees Quad Cities Open	74-65-72-64=275	−9	1 stroke	(United States) Dave Eichelberger
2	Jul 20, 1975	Pleasant Valley Classic	72-71-67-66=276	−8	1 stroke	(United States) Mac McLendon
3	May 30, 1976	Memorial Tournament	71-71-70-76=288	E	Playoff	(United States) Hale Irwin
4	Jun 9, 1985	Manufacturers Hanover Westchester Classic	70-63-72-70=275	−9	Playoff	(United States) George Burns, (United States) Raymond Floyd
5	Aug 25, 1985	NEC World Series of Golf	65-69-68-66=268	−12	4 strokes	(Zimbabwe) Denis Watson

PGA Tour playoff record (2–1)

No.	Year	Tournament	Opponent(s)	Result
1	1976	Memorial Tournament	(United States) Hale Irwin	Won with birdie on fourth extra hole
2	1985	Manufacturers Hanover Westchester Classic	(United States) George Burns, (United States) Raymond Floyd	Won with birdie on fourth extra hole
3	1986	Canon Sammy Davis Jr.-Greater Hartford Open	(United States) Mac O'Grady	Lost to par on first extra hole

=== Other wins (4) ===
this list may be incomplete

- 1973 Northern California Open
- 1974 California State Open
- 1980 Magnolia State Classic
- 1984 Hassan II Golf Trophy

=== Senior wins (3) ===
- 2003 Liberty Mutual Legends of Golf - Raphael Division (with Gary Koch)
- 2008 Liberty Mutual Legends of Golf - Raphael Division (with Gary Koch)
- 2009 Liberty Mutual Legends of Golf - Raphael Division (with Gary Koch)

== Results in major championships ==
Tournament	1975	1976	1977	1978	1979
Masters Tournament		T9	CUT		
U.S. Open			CUT		
The Open Championship			T26		
PGA Championship	CUT	T43	T31		

Tournament	1980	1981	1982	1983	1984	1985	1986	1987	1988	1989
Masters Tournament							T23	T4	CUT	
U.S. Open		T41		T32			T41	T46	T54	
The Open Championship							T43			
PGA Championship		T61	T54	T14	T65	T28	T47	T28		CUT

Tournament	1990	1991	1992	1993
Masters Tournament				
U.S. Open			CUT	CUT
The Open Championship				
PGA Championship				

Top 10
Did not play

CUT = missed the half-way cut
"T" indicates a tie for a place

=== Summary ===
Tournament	Wins	2nd	3rd	Top-5	Top-10	Top-25	Events	Cuts made
Masters Tournament	0	0	0	1	2	3	5	3
U.S. Open	0	0	0	0	0	0	8	5
The Open Championship	0	0	0	0	0	0	2	2
PGA Championship	0	0	0	0	0	1	11	9
Totals	0	0	0	1	2	4	26	19

- Most consecutive cuts made – 16 (1977 Open Championship – 1987 PGA)
- Longest streak of top-10s – 1 (twice)

== Results in The Players Championship ==
Tournament	1975	1976	1977	1978	1979	1980	1981	1982	1983	1984	1985	1986	1987	1988	1989	1990	1991	1992	1993	1994	1995
The Players Championship	T21	T3	T55	CUT			T45	5	T68	CUT	T27	T48	CUT	T51	T41	WD	CUT	CUT	CUT	T35	CUT

Top 10
Did not play

CUT = missed the halfway cut
WD = withdrew
"T" indicates a tie for a place

== See also ==
- 1974 PGA Tour Qualifying School graduates
