= Mark Rolfing =

American television golf commentator and resort marketing director

Mark Rolfing is a television golf commentator and a resort marketing director. Rolfing played professional golf in 1973 and 1974, after playing college golf at DePauw University in Indiana. At DePauw, he joined Delta Kappa Epsilon fraternity. However, he never qualified for the PGA Tour and in 1975 joined Kapalua Resort in Hawaii as head golf professional. He later moved into Kapalua's marketing department and formed his own television marketing firm, Rolfing Productions, in 1985. He joined the NBC Sports golf team as an on-course reporter in 1988. In 1992, he moved to the ESPN/ABC Sports golf team, before rejoining NBC in 1998. He remains an on-course reporter for NBC as of June, 2018.
