= Golf on NBC =

American television series

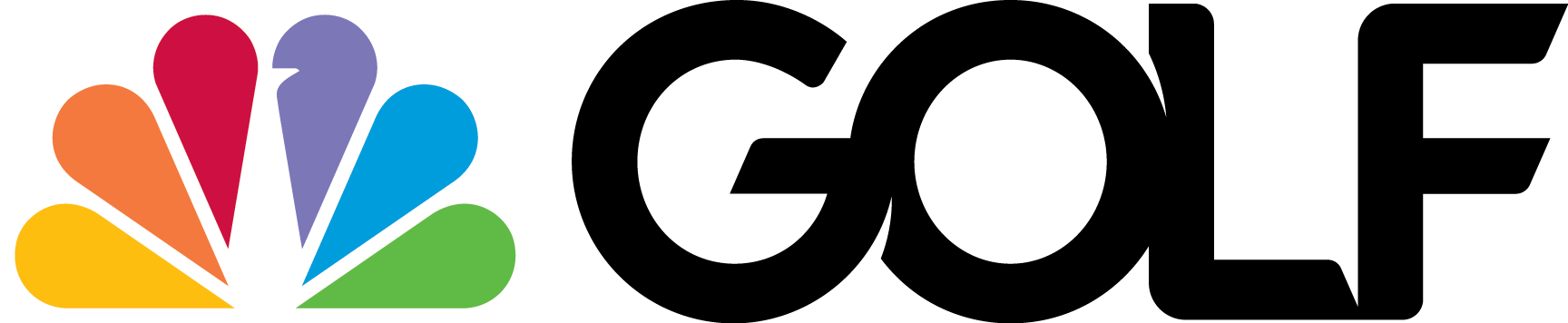
- Also known as: PGA Tour on NBC (1954–2011); Golf on NBC (2011–present); Golf Channel on NBC (2011–2022)
- Genre: American golf telecasts
- Presented by: Various commentators
- Country of origin: United States
- Original language: English
- No. of seasons: 73

Production
- Production location: Various tournament sites
- Camera setup: Multi-camera
- Running time: 390 minutes and until tournament ends (U.S. Open including advertisements) 510 minutes and until tournament ends (The Open Championship including advertisements) 210 minutes and until tournament ends (Other events including advertisements)
- Production company: NBC Sports

Original release
- Network: Comcast; NBC; NBCSN; Peacock; Telemundo, TeleXitos and Universo (Spanish audio/broadcast); Versant; USA Network; CNBC
- Release: June 18, 1954 – present

Related
- Golf Channel

Golf telecasts have aired on NBC since June 18, 1954, with some of its earliest telecasts having included the 1954 U.S. Open, and the first televised coverage of the Ryder Cup in 1959.

Presently, NBC televises around 8 PGA Tour events per-season, alternating with CBS on the FedEx Cup Playoffs since 2022. It also serves as the broadcast television outlet for two of the men's majors, the U.S. Open and The Open Championship. NBC has occasionally aired coverage for selected European Tour and LPGA events, although the majority of these tours' events are broadcast by sister network Golf Channel.

After NBC's parent company NBC Universal was acquired by Comcast, owner and operator of Golf Channel in February 2011, the channel's operations were merged directly into NBC Sports, and golf broadcasts on NBC took on the Golf Channel on NBC branding.

Since 2022, due to the realignments of NBC Sports output stemming from the launch of Peacock, closure of NBCSN, the move of cable rights to majors to USA Network, and NBC's renewed PGA Tour contract, the Golf Channel on NBC title was dropped and all golf telecasts across NBCUniversal properties (including Golf Channel) are now billed as NBC Sports telecasts on-air.

== Coverage overview ==
=== Early years ===
NBC first began televising golf events after it was awarded the television rights to the U.S. Open on June 18, 1954 with Lindsey Nelson anchoring the coverage from the 18th hole tower. In 1959, NBC provided the first ever telecast (airing two hours of highlights) of the Ryder Cup. The 1962 U.S. Open, marked the first time that NBC covered golf on a Sunday. The U.S. Open continued to air on the network through the 1965 event, however NBC rebuffed a long-term deal to broadcast the event when the United States Golf Association (USGA) decided on a true contract in 1966.

The network, however, did televise a handful of PGA Tour events over the following decades. For example, NBC's broadcast of the 1962 Tournament of Champions as the first color golf telecast. Five years later, NBC broadcast the Hawaiian Open Golf Tournament, which was the first live color sports transmission from Hawaii to the U.S. mainland.

In 1983, NBC televised the first Skins Game ever held, with Vin Scully and Ben Crenshaw serving as announcers for the tournament broadcast. From 1983 to 1989, Scully juggled duties for both golf and Major League Baseball telecasts for NBC, usually teaming with Lee Trevino. The only notable affiliate not to televise the first event was KYW-TV (now a CBS owned-and-operated station) in Philadelphia.

=== 1990s: Ryder Cup and U.S. Open ===
In 1991, coverage of the Skins Game moved to ABC Sports, after NBC obtained the rights to broadcast Notre Dame college football games.

After Vin Scully left NBC Sports following the network's loss of the Major League Baseball package to CBS, Bryant Gumbel, who was still co-hosting Today at the time, took over as NBC's primary golf anchor. In 1991, Gumbel was replaced by Charlie Jones and subsequently, Dick Enberg and (after the former left NBC Sports for CBS in the year 2000) Dan Hicks.

The American Century Celebrity Golf Classic was held in 1990 and sponsored by NBC, which broadcasts the second- and third-round coverage. The game NBC Sports Real Golf was unveiled at the 17th annual American Century Championship Celebrity Golf Event and promoted during NBC's broadcast of the event. NBC generally televised around five regular PGA Tour events per season at this time.

In 1991, the network acquired the broadcast rights to the Ryder Cup.

In 1995, NBC Sports acquired rights to the USGA championships, including the U.S. Open, from ESPN/ABC. ESPN retained rights to a portion of the weekday coverage, however NBC was the dominant rightsholder, including exclusive coverage of the weekend rounds. This took NBC's coverage to a new level, and marked the first time in the modern era of television that the network had televised a major championship. NBC, and its lead analyst Johnny Miller (who joined NBC in 1990), became synonymous with the U.S. Open, televising it for the next 20 years, through 2014.

=== 2000s: Expansion of PGA Tour rights ===
In January 2006, the PGA Tour announced a new set of television deals covering 2007 to 2012, increase the number of events covered by NBC Sports from five to ten. The deal also renewed broadcast deals for the Ryder Cup and the USGA Championships, including the U.S. Open. NBC is the only network which provide four days of major tournament coverage (CBS, which airs the Masters and the PGA Championship, only provides weekend coverage of its tournaments; starting in 2010, the Open Championship would not be aired live on a major broadcast network at all, with all four rounds airing on ESPN and ABC providing only edited highlights of the event).

NBC carried the weekend coverage of the JELD-WEN Tradition in 2007, 2009 and 2010. Golf Channel covered the early rounds (and all four rounds in 2008 while NBC carried the Summer Olympic Games from Beijing). NBC carried a tape delayed broadcast of the World Series of Golf, which was held from May 13 to 16, 2007, on June 23 and 24 of that year; the 2008 event of the series, played from May 12 to 15, and was televised by CBS on June 28 and 29.

In 2007, The Shark Shootout was moved to December, and was broadcast live by both Golf Channel and NBC. The event was originally broadcast in the United States by sister cable channel USA Network, and CBS – with USA broadcasting the first round on a tape-delayed basis, and CBS handling the second round live. The final round was not broadcast live to the entire country, as CBS' commitment to the NFL only allowed the round as it took place to air in the Eastern and Central Time Zones, with the rest of the U.S. seeing the event beginning at 4:00 p.m. Eastern Time.

=== 2010s: Golf Channel re-branding, loss of U.S. Open, gain of Open Championship ===
In January 2011, Comcast, owners of Golf Channel, acquired a majority stake in the NBC network's parent company NBC Universal. Comcast's existing sports properties were merged into the NBC Sports division, allowing Golf Channel to pool its personalities and other personnel with NBC. As a result of this synergy, Golf Channel took over production of NBC's golf telecasts, which were now co-branded under the "Golf Channel on NBC" banner, beginning at the 2011 WGC-Accenture Match Play Championship, with a co-branded logo adding the NBC peacock to Golf Channel's existing logo (the co-branded presentation would also migrate to Golf Channel proper shortly afterward).

While most golf broadcasts on NBC used Golf Channel's on-air branding as graphics packages as a result of the changes, the Players Championship, Ryder Cup and USGA tournaments maintain the distinctive theme music that NBC used prior to the rebranding (such as the theme from The Man from Snowy River for the Players, and Yanni's "In Celebration of Man" for the U.S. Open, which, with a rearrangement, was also temporarily used for the Open Championship).

In both 2013 and 2014, NBC broadcast weekend coverage of the Aberdeen Asset Management Scottish Open from Scotland. The 2013 event was played at Castle Stuart near Inverness, while the 2014 event was hosted by Royal Aberdeen, near Aberdeen. Coverage of the tournament during both years was anchored by Rich Lerner, and the action was called by lead European Tour announcer Dougie Donnelly and Golf Channel's lead PGA Tour analyst Frank Nobilo.

In August 2013, the USGA signed a broadcasting contract with Fox Sports, effective with the 2015 tournament season, ending NBC's relationship with the association after 20 years. Fox, which by the time of its first U.S. Open will have televised just two PGA Tour sanctioned events in its history (the unofficial CVS Caremark Charity Classic in 2011 and the unofficial Franklin Templeton Shootout in 2014), paid US$1 billion for the exclusive rights to all USGA championship events. Johnny Miller expressed disappointment at the loss, saying that he "had a feeling" NBC would not retain the rights, and that Fox would not be able to "fall out of a tree and do the U.S. Open". The 2014 U.S. Open at Pinehurst Resort was the network's 20th, and final, U.S. Open telecast in the modern era.

On June 8, 2015, it was announced that NBC and Golf Channel had acquired rights to The Open Championship under a 12-year deal, replacing ESPN. The R&A was, reportedly, won over by NBC's rights fee (which is approximately doubled in comparison to ESPN), and the performance of NBC's broadcasts of the Premier League, which air in a similar weekend morning time slot in the U.S.. The deal restored a men's major back to NBC for the first time since 2014, gave Golf Channel coverage of its first-ever major, and returned the Open to broadcast network television. Originally stated to begin in 2017, it was reported on October 12, 2015, that ESPN had opted out the final year of its contract to NBC, thus causing NBC coverage to begin in 2016 instead, mirroring a similar move by the BBC (who opted out to new rightsholder Sky Sports).

In January 2016, then-CBS analyst David Feherty moved to NBC to become a full-time contributor for its coverage and Golf Channel. Feherty already hosted a self-titled interview series for Golf Channel. Long-time ESPN personality Mike Tirico made his on-air debut with NBC during the 2016 Open Championship.

NBC and Golf Channel broadcast the revived golf tournaments at the 2016 Summer Olympics, as part of NBC's coverage of the Games. NBC staff served as the host broadcaster for the golf events on behalf of Olympic Broadcasting Services (OBS).

=== 2020s: PGA Tour renewal, regaining the U.S. Open ===
In 2020, NBC renewed its rights to the PGA Tour through 2030 under an eight-year deal beginning in 2022. While NBC will still air an average of 8 tournaments per-year, coverage of the final three FedEx Cup playoff events will now alternate between CBS and NBC.

On June 29, 2020, it was announced that Fox had withdrawn from its contract to carry USGA tournaments, and had sold the remaining seven years of the contract to NBC Sports through 2027. It was reported that the rescheduling of the majors caused by the COVID-19 pandemic was a factor in the decision (Fox had reportedly proposed moving the 2020 U.S. Open exclusively to FS1 to overcome conflicts with weekend college football and the NFL), and that Fox had originally discussed working with NBC before negotiating the withdrawal instead. The first event televised under the contract was the 2020 U.S. Women's Amateur. In a change in format, NBC shortened its broadcast windows for the U.S. Open to include hours exclusive to its streaming service Peacock.

In November 2021, it was announced that early round coverage of the U.S. Open, U.S. Women's Open, The Open Championship, and the Women's Open, will be moved from Golf Channel to USA Network beginning in 2022. In August 2025, NBC Sports renewed its rights to USGA tournaments through 2032; the agreement factors in plans by Comcast to spin off most of NBCUniversal's cable networks as the new company Versant, with USA Network and Golf Channel continuing to hold the cable rights to its tournaments.

NBC missed the first hour of the Sunday Night Baseball match-up between the Boston Red Sox and New York Yankees from Boston's Fenway Park on June 28, 2026 due to the network's coverage of Travelers Championship golf tournament running late following an almost 90 minute weather delay. To clarify, first pitch of the Red Sox-Yankees game on June 26, 2026 was at 7:20 p.m. Eastern Time. But NBC ultimately, didn’t finally pick up the coverage until approximately 8:28 p.m. By this point, the game was already in the bottom of the fourth inning. In the meantime, NBC forwarded the Sunday Night Baseball coverage to Peacock and NBCSN.

== Tournaments ==
=== Current ===
PGA Tour, annual coverage

- The Sentry (2013–present; except 2018)
- Sony Open in Hawaii (2015; 2023–present)
- Cognizant Classic (1982–present)
- Arnold Palmer Invitational (1974–present)
- The Players Championship (1988–2019, 2021–present)
- WGC-Dell Match Play (2007–2019, 2021–present)
- Texas Children's Houston Open (2007–2018, 2024–present)
- Valero Texas Open (2013–2015, 2019, 2021–present)
- Travelers Championship (1982–1983, partial coverage in 2024 on CNBC produced by CBS Sports, 2026–)
- The Open Championship (2016–2019, 2021–present)
- Valspar Championship (2007–2019, 2022–present)

Tournaments alternated with CBS

- NBC tournaments airing on CBS because of the Winter Olympics
  - Honda Classic (2018)
  - WGC-Dell Match Play Championship (2010, 2014)
- CBS tournaments airing on NBC because of the Super Bowl
  - Phoenix Open: 2007, 2013, 2016, 2019, 2021, 2024
  - Los Angeles Open: 2010
- FedEx Cup playoff tournaments (in even-numbered years)
  - St. Jude Championship (2022–present)
  - BMW Championship (2007–present, even-numbered years starting in 2022)
  - The Tour Championship (2007–present, even-numbered years starting in 2022)

USGA

- U.S. Open (1954–1965, 1995–2014, 2020–present)
- U.S. Senior Open (1995–2014, 2021–present)
- U.S. Women's Open (1995–2014, 2020–present)
- U.S. Amateur (1995–2014, 2020–present)

LPGA Tour

- Hilton Grand Vacations Tournament of Champions (2019–present)
- CME Group Tour Championship (2019–present)

Majors and special events

- Ryder Cup (1991–present)
- Presidents Cup (2000–present)
- Senior PGA Championship (1990–present)
- Hero World Challenge (2007–present)
- PNC Father/Son Challenge (1995–2008, 2012–present)
- American Century Championship (1990–present)
- KPMG Women's PGA Championship (2015–present)
- The Evian Championship (2013–present)
- Women's British Open (2016–present)
- Senior Open Championship (2016–present)
- The Solheim Cup (1994–2002, 2017–present)
- Augusta National Women's Amateur (2019–present)
- Grant Thornton Invitational (2007–2013, 2017–present)
- The Chevron Championship (1978–1990, 2023–present)

=== Former ===
- Bob Hope Chrysler Classic (1960s–1998)
- Farmers Insurance Open (until 1998)
- Northern Trust Open (2010, CBS Super Bowl year)
- BellSouth Classic (1999–2006)
- Zurich Classic of New Orleans (1975–1998, 2007–2008)
- WGC-Cadillac Championship/Doral Open (1999–2016)
- The Tradition (2007–2010)
- Senior Players Championship (2007–2009)
- Sony Open in Hawaii (2015)
- UL International Crown (2016)
- WGC-Mexico Championship (2017–2021)

European Tour

- Aberdeen Asset Management Scottish Open (2013–2021)

=== Coverage ===
Year	Event	Location	Date	TV		Streaming	
Year	Event	Location	Date	Channel	Timings	Platform	Timings
2018	Honda Classic	PGA National Resort	22 February	Golf Channel	3:00pm–6:00pm	—N/a	—N/a
2018	Honda Classic	PGA National Resort	23 February	Golf Channel	3:00pm–6:00pm	—N/a	—N/a
2018	Honda Classic	PGA National Resort	24 February	Golf Channel	1:00pm–2:45pm	—N/a	—N/a
2018	Honda Classic	PGA National Resort	25 February	Golf Channel	1:00pm–2:45pm	—N/a	—N/a
2019	Phoenix Open	TPC Scottsdale	31 January	Golf Channel	3:00pm–7:00pm	—N/a	—N/a
2019	Phoenix Open	TPC Scottsdale	1 February	Golf Channel	3:00pm–7:00pm	—N/a	—N/a
2019	Phoenix Open	TPC Scottsdale	2 February	Golf Channel	1:00pm–3:00pm	—N/a	—N/a
2019	Phoenix Open	TPC Scottsdale	2 February	NBC	3:00pm–6:00pm	—N/a	—N/a
2019	Phoenix Open	TPC Scottsdale	3 February	Golf Channel	1:00pm–3:00pm	—N/a	—N/a
2019	Phoenix Open	TPC Scottsdale	3 February	NBC	3:00pm–6:00pm	—N/a	—N/a
2019	3M Open	TPC Twin Cities	4 July	Golf Channel	2:00pm–6:00pm	—N/a	—N/a
2019	3M Open	TPC Twin Cities	5 July	Golf Channel	2:00pm–6:00pm	—N/a	—N/a
2019	3M Open	TPC Twin Cities	6 July	Golf Channel	1:00pm–2:45pm	—N/a	—N/a
2019	3M Open	TPC Twin Cities	7 July	Golf Channel	1:00pm–2:45pm	—N/a	—N/a
2020	3M Open	TPC Twin Cities	23 July	Golf Channel	2:30pm–6:30pm	—N/a	—N/a
2020	3M Open	TPC Twin Cities	24 July	Golf Channel	2:30pm–6:30pm	—N/a	—N/a
2020	3M Open	TPC Twin Cities	25 July	Golf Channel	1:00pm–3:00pm	—N/a	—N/a
2020	3M Open	TPC Twin Cities	26 July	Golf Channel	1:00pm–3:00pm	—N/a	—N/a
2021	Phoenix Open	TPC Scottsdale	4 February	Golf Channel	3:00pm–7:00pm	Peacock	3:00pm–7:00pm
2021	Phoenix Open	TPC Scottsdale	5 February	Golf Channel	3:00pm–7:00pm	Peacock	3:00pm–7:00pm
2021	Phoenix Open	TPC Scottsdale	6 February	Golf Channel	1:00pm–3:00pm	Peacock	1:00pm–6:00pm
2021	Phoenix Open	TPC Scottsdale	6 February	NBC	3:00pm–6:00pm	Peacock	1:00pm–6:00pm
2021	Phoenix Open	TPC Scottsdale	7 February	Golf Channel	1:00pm–3:00pm	Peacock	1:00pm–6:00pm
2021	Phoenix Open	TPC Scottsdale	7 February	NBC	3:00pm–6:00pm	Peacock	1:00pm–6:00pm
2021	The Byron Nelson	TPC Craig Ranch	13 May	Golf Channel	3:30pm–6:30pm	Peacock	3:30pm–6:30pm
2021	The Byron Nelson	TPC Craig Ranch	14 May	Golf Channel	3:30pm–6:30pm	Peacock	3:30pm–6:30pm
2021	The Byron Nelson	TPC Craig Ranch	15 May	Golf Channel	1:00pm–3:00pm	Peacock	1:00pm–3:00pm
2021	The Byron Nelson	TPC Craig Ranch	16 May	Golf Channel	1:00pm–3:00pm	Peacock	1:00pm–3:00pm
2021	John Deere Classic	TPC Deere Run	8 July	Golf Channel	3:00pm–6:00pm	Peacock	3:00pm–6:00pm
2021	John Deere Classic	TPC Deere Run	9 July	Golf Channel	3:00pm–6:00pm	Peacock	3:00pm–6:00pm
2021	John Deere Classic	TPC Deere Run	10 July	Golf Channel	1:00pm–3:00pm	Peacock	1:00pm–3:00pm
2021	John Deere Classic	TPC Deere Run	11 July	Golf Channel	1:00pm–3:00pm	Peacock	1:00pm–3:00pm
2021	3M Open	TPC Twin Cities	22 July	Golf Channel	2:30pm–6:30pm	Peacock	2:30pm–6:30pm
2021	3M Open	TPC Twin Cities	23 July	Golf Channel	2:30pm–6:30pm	Peacock	2:30pm–6:30pm
2021	3M Open	TPC Twin Cities	24 July	Golf Channel	1:00pm–3:00pm	Peacock	1:00pm–3:00pm
2021	3M Open	TPC Twin Cities	25 July	Golf Channel	1:00pm–3:00pm	Peacock	1:00pm–3:00pm
2022	The Byron Nelson	TPC Craig Ranch	12 May	Golf Channel	4:00pm–7:00pm	Peacock	4:00pm–7:00pm
2022	The Byron Nelson	TPC Craig Ranch	13 May	Golf Channel	4:00pm–7:00pm	Peacock	4:00pm–7:00pm
2022	The Byron Nelson	TPC Craig Ranch	14 May	Golf Channel	1:00pm–3:00pm	Peacock	1:00pm–3:00pm
2022	The Byron Nelson	TPC Craig Ranch	15 May	Golf Channel	1:00pm–3:00pm	Peacock	1:00pm–3:00pm
2022	John Deere Classic	TPC Deere Run	30 June	Golf Channel	4:00pm–7:00pm	Peacock	4:00pm–7:00pm
2022	John Deere Classic	TPC Deere Run	1 July	Golf Channel	4:00pm–7:00pm	Peacock	4:00pm–7:00pm
2022	John Deere Classic	TPC Deere Run	2 July	Golf Channel	1:00pm–3:00pm	Peacock	1:00pm–3:00pm
2022	John Deere Classic	TPC Deere Run	3 July	Golf Channel	1:00pm–3:00pm	Peacock	1:00pm–3:00pm
2022	3M Open	TPC Twin Cities	21 July	Golf Channel	2:00pm–6:00pm	Peacock	2:00pm–6:00pm
2022	3M Open	TPC Twin Cities	22 July	Golf Channel	2:00pm–6:00pm	Peacock	2:00pm–6:00pm
2022	3M Open	TPC Twin Cities	23 July	Golf Channel	1:00pm–3:00pm	Peacock	1:00pm–3:00pm
2022	3M Open	TPC Twin Cities	24 July	Golf Channel	1:00pm–3:00pm	Peacock	1:00pm–3:00pm
2023	The Byron Nelson	TPC Craig Ranch	11 May	Golf Channel	4:00pm–7:00pm	Peacock	4:00pm–7:00pm
2023	The Byron Nelson	TPC Craig Ranch	12 May	Golf Channel	4:00pm–7:00pm	Peacock	4:00pm–7:00pm
2023	The Byron Nelson	TPC Craig Ranch	13 May	Golf Channel	1:00pm–3:00pm	Peacock	1:00pm–3:00pm
2023	The Byron Nelson	TPC Craig Ranch	14 May	Golf Channel	1:00pm–3:00pm	Peacock	1:00pm–3:00pm
2023	Rocket Mortgage Classic	Detroit Golf Club	29 June	Golf Channel	3:00pm–6:00pm	Peacock	3:00pm–6:00pm
2023	Rocket Mortgage Classic	Detroit Golf Club	30 June	Golf Channel	3:00pm–6:00pm	Peacock	3:00pm–6:00pm
2023	Rocket Mortgage Classic	Detroit Golf Club	1 July	Golf Channel	1:00pm–3:00pm	Peacock	1:00pm–3:00pm
2023	Rocket Mortgage Classic	Detroit Golf Club	2 July	Golf Channel	1:00pm–3:00pm	Peacock	1:00pm–3:00pm
2023	John Deere Classic	TPC Deere Run	6 July	Golf Channel	4:00pm–7:00pm	Peacock	4:00pm–7:00pm
2023	John Deere Classic	TPC Deere Run	7 July	Golf Channel	4:00pm–7:00pm	Peacock	4:00pm–7:00pm
2023	John Deere Classic	TPC Deere Run	8 July	Golf Channel	1:00pm–3:00pm	Peacock	1:00pm–3:00pm
2023	John Deere Classic	TPC Deere Run	9 July	Golf Channel	1:00pm–3:00pm	Peacock	1:00pm–3:00pm
2023	3M Open	TPC Twin Cities	27 July	Golf Channel	4:00pm–7:00pm	Peacock	7:00pm–7:00pm
2023	3M Open	TPC Twin Cities	28 July	Golf Channel	4:00pm–7:00pm	Peacock	7:00pm–7:00pm
2023	3M Open	TPC Twin Cities	29 July	Golf Channel	1:00pm–3:00pm	Peacock	1:00pm–3:00pm
2023	3M Open	TPC Twin Cities	30 July	Golf Channel	1:00pm–3:00pm	Peacock	1:00pm–3:00pm
2023	St. Jude Championship	TPC Southwind	10 August	Golf Channel	2:00pm–6:00pm	Peacock	2:00pm–6:00pm
2023	St. Jude Championship	TPC Southwind	11 August	Golf Channel	2:00pm–6:00pm	Peacock	2:00pm–6:00pm
2023	St. Jude Championship	TPC Southwind	12 August	Golf Channel	1:00pm–3:00pm	Peacock	1:00pm–3:00pm
2023	St. Jude Championship	TPC Southwind	13 August	Golf Channel	12:00pm–2:00pm	Peacock	12:00pm–2:00pm
2023	BMW Championship	Caves Valley Golf Club	17 August	Golf Channel	2:00pm–6:00pm	Peacock	2:00pm–6:00pm
2023	BMW Championship	Caves Valley Golf Club	18 August	Golf Channel	2:00pm–6:00pm	Peacock	2:00pm–6:00pm
2023	BMW Championship	Caves Valley Golf Club	19 August	Golf Channel	1:00pm–3:00pm	Peacock	1:00pm–3:00pm
2023	BMW Championship	Caves Valley Golf Club	20 August	Golf Channel	12:00pm–2:00pm	Peacock	12:00pm–2:00pm
2023	Tour Championship	East Lake Golf Club	24 August	Golf Channel	1:00pm–6:00pm	Peacock	1:00pm–6:00pm
2023	Tour Championship	East Lake Golf Club	25 August	Golf Channel	1:00pm–6:00pm	Peacock	1:00pm–6:00pm
2023	Tour Championship	East Lake Golf Club	26 August	Golf Channel	1:00pm–3:00pm	Peacock	1:00pm–3:00pm
2023	Tour Championship	East Lake Golf Club	27 August	Golf Channel	12:00pm–1:30pm	Peacock	12:00pm–1:30pm
2024	Phoenix Open	TPC Scottsdale	8 February	Golf Channel	4:00pm–8:00pm	Peacock	4:00pm–8:00pm
2024	Phoenix Open	TPC Scottsdale	9 February	Golf Channel	4:00pm–8:00pm	Peacock	4:00pm–8:00pm
2024	Phoenix Open	TPC Scottsdale	10 February	Golf Channel	1:00pm–3:00pm	Peacock	1:00pm–6:00pm
2024	Phoenix Open	TPC Scottsdale	10 February	NBC	3:00pm–6:00pm	Peacock	1:00pm–6:00pm
2024	Phoenix Open	TPC Scottsdale	11 February	Golf Channel	1:00pm–3:00pm	Peacock	1:00pm–6:00pm
2024	Phoenix Open	TPC Scottsdale	11 February	NBC	3:00pm–6:00pm	Peacock	1:00pm–6:00pm
2024	Texas Children's Houston Open	Memorial Park Municipal Golf Course	28 March	Golf Channel	4:00pm–7:00pm	Peacock	4:00pm–7:00pm
2024	Texas Children's Houston Open	Memorial Park Municipal Golf Course	29 March	Golf Channel	4:00pm–7:00pm	Peacock	4:00pm–7:00pm
2024	Texas Children's Houston Open	Memorial Park Municipal Golf Course	30 March	Golf Channel	1:00pm–3:30pm	Peacock	1:00pm–6:00pm
2024	Texas Children's Houston Open	Memorial Park Municipal Golf Course	30 March	NBC	3:30pm–6:00pm	Peacock	1:00pm–6:00pm
2024	Texas Children's Houston Open	Memorial Park Municipal Golf Course	31 March	Golf Channel	1:00pm–2:30pm	Peacock	1:00pm–6:00pm
2024	Texas Children's Houston Open	Memorial Park Municipal Golf Course	31 March	NBC	2:30pm–6:00pm	Peacock	1:00pm–6:00pm
2024	The Byron Nelson	TPC Craig Ranch	2 May	Golf Channel	4:00pm–7:00pm	Peacock	4:00pm–7:00pm
2024	The Byron Nelson	TPC Craig Ranch	3 May	Golf Channel	4:00pm–7:00pm	Peacock	4:00pm–7:00pm
2024	The Byron Nelson	TPC Craig Ranch	4 May	Golf Channel	1:00pm–3:00pm	Peacock	1:00pm–3:00pm
2024	The Byron Nelson	TPC Craig Ranch	5 May	Golf Channel	1:00pm–3:00pm	Peacock	1:00pm–3:00pm
2024	Rocket Mortgage Classic	Detroit Golf Club	27 June	Golf Channel	3:00pm–6:00pm	Peacock	3:00pm–6:00pm
2024	Rocket Mortgage Classic	Detroit Golf Club	28 June	Golf Channel	3:00pm–6:00pm	Peacock	3:00pm–6:00pm
2024	Rocket Mortgage Classic	Detroit Golf Club	29 June	Golf Channel	1:00pm–3:00pm	Peacock	1:00pm–3:00pm
2024	Rocket Mortgage Classic	Detroit Golf Club	30 June	Golf Channel	1:00pm–3:00pm	Peacock	1:00pm–3:00pm
2024	John Deere Classic	TPC Deere Run	4 July	Golf Channel	4:00pm–7:00pm	Peacock	4:00pm–7:00pm
2024	John Deere Classic	TPC Deere Run	5 July	Golf Channel	4:00pm–7:00pm	Peacock	4:00pm–7:00pm
2024	John Deere Classic	TPC Deere Run	6 July	Golf Channel	1:00pm–3:00pm	Peacock	1:00pm–3:00pm
2024	John Deere Classic	TPC Deere Run	7 July	Golf Channel	1:00pm–3:00pm	Peacock	1:00pm–3:00pm
2024	3M Open	TPC Twin Cities	25 July	Golf Channel	3:30pm–6:30pm	Peacock	3:30pm–6:30pm
2024	3M Open	TPC Twin Cities	26 July	Golf Channel	3:30pm–6:30pm	Peacock	3:30pm–6:30pm
2024	3M Open	TPC Twin Cities	27 July	Golf Channel	1:00pm–3:00pm	Peacock	1:00pm–3:00pm
2024	3M Open	TPC Twin Cities	28 July	Golf Channel	1:00pm–3:00pm	Peacock	1:00pm–3:00pm
2024	St. Jude Championship	TPC Southwind	15 August	Golf Channel	2:00pm–6:00pm	Peacock	2:00pm–6:00pm
2024	St. Jude Championship	TPC Southwind	16 August	Golf Channel	2:00pm–6:00pm	Peacock	2:00pm–6:00pm
2024	St. Jude Championship	TPC Southwind	17 August	Golf Channel	1:00pm–3:00pm	Peacock	1:00pm–6:00pm
2024	St. Jude Championship	TPC Southwind	17 August	NBC	3:00pm–6:00pm	Peacock	1:00pm–6:00pm
2024	St. Jude Championship	TPC Southwind	18 August	Golf Channel	12:00pm–2:00pm	Peacock	12:00pm–6:00pm
2024	St. Jude Championship	TPC Southwind	18 August	NBC	2:00pm–6:00pm	Peacock	12:00pm–6:00pm
2024	BMW Championship	Caves Valley Golf Club	22 August	Golf Channel	3:00pm–7:00pm	Peacock	3:00pm–7:00pm
2024	BMW Championship	Caves Valley Golf Club	23 August	Golf Channel	3:00pm–7:00pm	Peacock	3:00pm–7:00pm
2024	BMW Championship	Caves Valley Golf Club	24 August	Golf Channel	1:00pm–3:00pm	Peacock	1:00pm–6:00pm
2024	BMW Championship	Caves Valley Golf Club	24 August	NBC	3:00pm–6:00pm	Peacock	1:00pm–6:00pm
2024	BMW Championship	Caves Valley Golf Club	25 August	Golf Channel	12:00pm–2:00pm	Peacock	12:00pm–6:00pm
2024	BMW Championship	Caves Valley Golf Club	25 August	NBC	2:00pm–6:00pm	Peacock	12:00pm–6:00pm
2024	Tour Championship	East Lake Golf Club	29 August	Golf Channel	1:00pm–6:00pm	Peacock	1:00pm–6:00pm
2024	Tour Championship	East Lake Golf Club	30 August	Golf Channel	1:00pm–6:00pm	Peacock	1:00pm–6:00pm
2024	Tour Championship	East Lake Golf Club	31 August	Golf Channel	1:00pm–2:30pm	Peacock	1:00pm–7:00pm
2024	Tour Championship	East Lake Golf Club	31 August	NBC	2:30pm–7:00pm	Peacock	1:00pm–7:00pm
2024	Tour Championship	East Lake Golf Club	1 September	Golf Channel	12:00pm–1:30pm	Peacock	12:00pm–6:00pm
2024	Tour Championship	East Lake Golf Club	1 September	NBC	1:30pm–6:00pm	Peacock	12:00pm–6:00pm
2025	Phoenix Open	TPC Scottsdale	6 February	Golf Channel	4:00pm–8:00pm	Peacock	4:00pm–8:00pm
2025	Phoenix Open	TPC Scottsdale	7 February	Golf Channel	4:00pm–8:00pm	Peacock	4:00pm–8:00pm
2025	Phoenix Open	TPC Scottsdale	8 February	Golf Channel	1:00pm–3:00pm	Peacock	1:00pm–3:00pm
2025	Phoenix Open	TPC Scottsdale	9 February	Golf Channel	1:00pm–3:00pm	Peacock	1:00pm–3:00pm
2025	John Deere Classic	TPC Deere Run	3 July	Golf Channel	4:00pm–7:00pm	Peacock	4:00pm–7:00pm
2025	John Deere Classic	TPC Deere Run	4 July	Golf Channel	4:00pm–7:00pm	Peacock	4:00pm–7:00pm
2025	John Deere Classic	TPC Deere Run	5 July	Golf Channel	1:00pm–3:00pm	Peacock	1:00pm–3:00pm
2025	John Deere Classic	TPC Deere Run	6 July	Golf Channel	1:00pm–3:00pm	Peacock	1:00pm–3:00pm

== Commentators ==
The following is a list of television personalities for NBC Sports Group's telecasts of golf, which are carried by NBC and Golf Channel.

=== Current^ ===
==== PGA Tour (NBC / GC) ====
- Hosts: Terry Gannon / Steve Sands / George Savaricas
- Analysts: Kevin Kisner / Brad Faxon / Frank Nobilo / Curt Byrum / Jim Gallagher Jr. / Brendon De Jonge
- Reporters: Jim "Bones" Mackay / Smylie Kaufman / John Wood / Arron Oberholser / Billy Ray Brown / Colt Knost / Graham DeLaet / Tripp Isenhour
- Interviewers: Cara Banks, Kira Dixon

==== LPGA Tour (NBC / GC) ====
- Hosts: Grant Boone / Cara Banks / Tom Abbott
- Analysts: Morgan Pressel
- Reporters: Karen Stupples / Kay Cockerill / Paige Mackenzie / Mel Reid

==== PGA Tour Champions (GC) ====
- Hosts: Bob Papa / John Swantek
- Analysts: Paul Azinger / Peter Jacobsen
- Reporters: John Cook / John Maginnes / Jeff Sluman

==== Korn Ferry Tour (GC) ====
- Hosts: Shane Bacon
- Analysts: James Nitties
- Reporters: Emilia Doran

==== Golf Central (GC) ====
- Hosts: Rich Lerner / Cara Banks / Anna Jackson / Steve Burkowski
- Analysts: Brandel Chamblee / Johnson Wagner / Jim Gallagher / Tripp Isenhour
- Reporters: Todd Lewis / Kira Dixon / Rex Hoggard

^Commentators may occasionally serve in roles other than those listed above. Additional commentators are occasionally used.

=== Former ===
==== Hosts ====
- Don Criqui
- Dick Enberg (1995–1999)
- Bill Flemming – While at NBC, Flemming called the U.S. Open golf tournament in 1957.
- Bryant Gumbel (1990)
- Dan Hicks (2000–2026)
- Charlie Jones (1991–1992)
- Jim Lampley (1993–1994)
- Bill Mazer
- Jay Randolph
- Vin Scully (1983–1989) – Scully hosted coverage of The Players Championship and The Skins Game in 1989, having called the latter since he first came to NBC in 1983. KYW-TV in Philadelphia notably refused to televise the 1983 event, the inaugural Skins Game and Scully's first involvement in golf since his time with the PGA Tour on CBS, where he had called The Masters until 1982.
- Jim Simpson

==== Analysts ====
- John Brodie (1981–1998)
- Bruce Devlin (1977–1982)
- Gary Hallberg
- Brad Faxon (2010)
- Dave Marr (1995–1997)
- Johnny Miller (1990–2019)
- Bob Murphy (2000–2009)
- Debbie Steinbach
- Bob Toski
- Lee Trevino (1983–1989)
- Bob Trumpy (1990–1996)

==== Reporters ====
- Mark McCumber (1991–1994)
- Dan Pohl (1995–1997)
- John Schroeder (1991–1999)
- Ed Sneed (2000–2004)
- Dottie Pepper (2005–2012)

==== Interviewers ====
- Bob Costas (U.S. Open, 2003–2013)
- Dan Patrick (The Players Championship, 2009–2012)
- Josh Elliott (The Players Championship, 2014–2015)

== See also ==
- Gillette Cavalcade of Sports

Records
Preceded by None; ABC; Fox	U.S. Open network television broadcaster 1954–1965; 1995–2014; 2020–present	Succeeded by ABC; Fox; Incumbent
Preceded by ESPN	The Open Championship American television broadcaster 2016–present	Succeeded by Incumbent
