= PGA Tour on CBS =

- Also known as: Golf on CBS
- Genre: American golf telecasts
- Presented by: Various commentators
- Country of origin: United States
- Original language: English
- No. of seasons: 71

Production
- Production location: Various tournament sites
- Camera setup: Multi-camera
- Running time: 210 minutes and until tournament ends (inc. adverts)
- Production company: CBS Sports

Original release
- Network: CBS; CBSSN; Paramount+
- Release: April 7, 1956 – present

PGA Tour on CBS (and Golf on CBS) is the branding used for broadcasts of the PGA Tour that are produced by CBS Sports, the sports division of the CBS television network in the United States.

== Coverage overview ==
CBS Sports has been a carrier of PGA Tour golf since 1970. CBS was the Tour's primary television partner from 1970 to 1998, carrying 20 and more events per season. CBS shared duties as primary Tour carrier with ABC Sports from 1999 to 2006, covering around 15 events per season. CBS regained its primary status in 2007, once again covering 20 or more events per season, and has remained so ever since. CBS also holds broadcast television rights to two of the four majors, the Masters Tournament and PGA Championship. CBS has long-term deals for the PGA Championship (initially from 1958 to 1964 and again starting in 1991). Meanwhile, the Masters operates under one-year contracts; CBS has been the main television partner every year since 1956.

=== Innovations ===
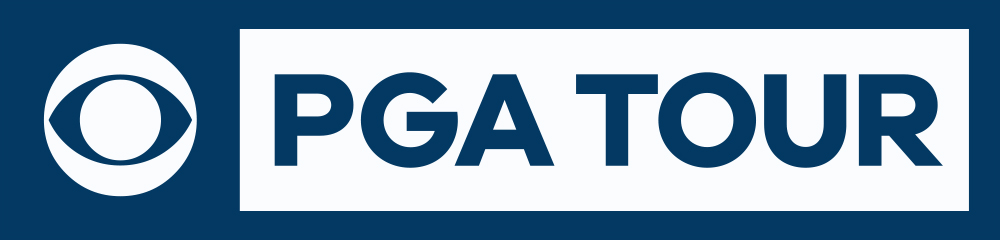
Logo used from 2016 until 2021

Frank Chirkinian was known as the 'father of televised golf' for the impact he had on golf broadcasting. He came to the attention of CBS after he impressed with his direction of the 1958 PGA Championship. Recruited by the network, who had no one with expertise in the relatively new field of golf broadcasting, he went on to be executive producer of CBS's golf coverage from 1959 to 1996. During his time at CBS, he was nicknamed "The Ayatollah" for his brusque, uncompromising approach to directing broadcasts. Chirkinian was particularly well regarded for the coverage of the Masters Tournament that he oversaw for four decades, working closely with the management of Augusta National to ensure they were satisfied. Following his retirement, he remained a consultant to CBS for golf coverage.

Chirkinian was responsible for a number of innovations in the television presentation of golf. He ensured as many microphones as possible were placed around the golf course to pick up the sounds of the tournament and golfers' conversations, rather than having commentators talk over silent footage. He showed as many golf shots as possible, cutting quickly from player to player to keep up the pace of the broadcast, unafraid of focusing on the game's stars. The use of multiple cameras was introduced during Chirkinian's tenure, including high-angle cameras mounted in trees and on blimps for the first time. Chirkinian said that he was most proud of being the first to display golfers' scores relative to par, rather than cumulatively, making it simpler to work out how they were faring relative to the rest of the field. Most of all, Chirkinian thought it important to allow coverage to focus on golfers and the shots they made, and was critical of recent innovations in golf broadcasting that he saw as distracting and unnecessary.

Since 2004, all of CBS's golf broadcasts outside of the Masters have featured super slow motion video of golfers' shots from a super slow motion camera used for swing analysis by Peter Kostis. The camera was known as "CBS Swing Vision" during its first year; it gained sponsorship from Konica Minolta the next season, an arrangement that has lasted over a decade. The feature was known as the "Konica Minolta SwingVision camera" in 2005, the "Bizhub SwingVision camera" from 2006 to 2008, and the "Konica Minolta Bizhub SwingVision camera" since 2009. The camera is actually provided by Tech Imaging Services, not Konica Minolta, which merely sponsors the feature to promote its Bizhub line of printers (Konica Minolta was previously well known as a still-image camera manufacturer but sold that product line to Sony in 2006). The cameras are present and used at the Masters, however they are not branded or sponsored.

In 2021, CBS adopted several new features in its golf broadcasts, including adding a rules analyst to its broadcast team, and adopting a persistent leaderboard displayed in the bottom-right of the screen (a feature introduced by Fox during its U.S. Open telecasts). In the 2023 season, CBS began to experiment with technology that can predict where a ball will land while in-flight, and live in-game interviews with players (particularly Max Homa during a hole at the Farmers Insurance Open).

=== Masters Tournament ===
CBS has televised the Masters Tournament in the United States every year since 1956, when it used six cameras and covered only the final four holes. Because of resistance from the tournament organizers, 18 hole coverage did not begin until 2002 (coverage generally joining with the final group on the fifth or sixth hole all four days), but by 2006, over 50 cameras were used. USA Network added first- and second-round coverage in 1982, which was also produced by the CBS production team.

The previously independent USA Sports became part of NBC Sports through NBC Universal in 2004, meaning the cable and network coverage of the Masters was split between rival companies. However, the broadcast continued to largely be produced in association with CBS Sports — an arrangement that continued with the move of its rights to ESPN in 2008.

In 2005, CBS broadcast the tournament with high-definition fixed and handheld wired cameras, as well as standard-definition wireless handheld cameras. In 2007, CBS added "Masters Extra," an hour's extra full-field bonus coverage daily on the internet, preceding the television broadcasts. In 2008, CBS added full coverage of holes 15 and 16 live on the web.

While Augusta National Golf Club has consistently chosen CBS as its U.S. broadcast partner, it has done so on successive one-year contracts. Due to the lack of long-term contractual security, as well as the club's limited dependence on broadcast rights fees (owing to its affluent membership), it is widely held that CBS allows Augusta National greater control over the content of the broadcast, or at least perform some form of self-censorship, in order to maintain future rights. The club, however, has insisted it does not make any demands with respect to the content of the broadcast.

==== Announcers ====
There are some controversial aspects to this relationship. Announcers refer to the gallery as "patrons" rather than spectators or fans ("gallery" itself is also used), and use the term "second cut" instead of "rough" (however, the second cut is normally substantially shorter than comparable "primary rough" at other courses). Announcers who have been deemed not to have acted with the decorum expected by the club have been removed, notably Jack Whitaker and analyst Gary McCord. Whitaker referred to the gallery at the end of the 18-hole Monday playoff in 1966 as a "mob" and missed five years (1967–1971); McCord last worked on the Masters telecast in 1994, being banned that summer after using the terms "bikini wax" and "body bags" in his descriptions. There also tends to be a lack of discussion of any controversy involving Augusta National, such as the 2003 Martha Burk protests. However, there have not been many other major issues in recent years.

Twice, CBS colleagues who had left the network after doing their final NFL games formally signed off at the Masters. In 1982, after Vin Scully announced he would leave CBS after calling his final NFL game (the NFC Championship Game between the San Francisco 49ers and Dallas Cowboys) to eventually join NBC, he stayed to conclude his CBS career in 1982. In 1994, after CBS had lost the rights to the National Football Conference to Fox (where Pat Summerall and his broadcasting colleague, John Madden would soon move over to) prior to the 1994 NFL season. Summerall stayed at CBS to make the 1994 Masters his final broadcast for CBS, where he was a mainstay for over 30 years.

Summerall signed off the broadcast thus, surrounded by the other CBS commentators that were working the tournament:

So, on behalf of our entire broadcast group, for the last time, I'm Pat Summerall saying [to the others] "So long"? [the other commentators speak all at once, wishing Pat well] Thanks, guys. [to the audience] I'll miss you.

==== Augusta National regulations ====
As Augusta National Golf Club has its own television contract with CBS, and is separate from the PGA Tour, the contract carries different regulations than other tournaments.

Commercial interruptions are restricted compared to most television programming. A typical hour of television in daytime or primetime carries 38 minutes of programming and 22 minutes of commercials; in contrast, Augusta limits the time allocated to commercials to four minutes per hour (as opposed to the usual 12 or more). This is subsidized by selling exclusive sponsorship packages to three companies. In the immediate aftermath of the Martha Burk controversy, there were no commercials during the 2003 and 2004 broadcasts, although international commercial broadcasters continued to insert their own commercials into the coverage. The Players Championship began imposing a similar rule in 2007 and the U.S. Open attempted to follow suit to a lesser extent in 2005, and has done so again with a new contract in 2015. However, CBS' own coverage of the PGA Championship has been maligned in recent years for having excessive commercials.

The club also disallows promotions for other network programs, except an on-screen mention of 60 Minutes should the final round run long, or right before the coverage ends. Other broadcast material not allowed include sponsored graphics used in regular PGA Tour events, blimps and on-course announcers. There is also typically no cut-in for other news and sports, either from CBS or its affiliates, unless it is urgent breaking news or severe weather coverage. CBS uses "Augusta" by Dave Loggins as the event telecast's distinctive theme music.

Augusta National has placed significant restrictions on the tournament's broadcast hours compared to other major championships, perhaps to increase the tournament's ratings, or to reward ticket-holders. Only in the 21st century did the tournament allow CBS to air 18-hole coverage of the leaders, a standard at the other three majors. Only three hours of cable coverage is scheduled for the early rounds each day (CBS has a highlights package that airs in late night on Thursday and Fridays during the tournament). International broadcasters do not receive additional coverage, although they may take commercial breaks at different times from CBS or ESPN. As noted before, an additional hour of coverage each day is streamed online. In 2026 now 6 1/2 hours of the first two rounds is televised daily with the first two hours on Amazon Prime Video and the other four and a half on ESPN. CBS has exclusive coverage for seven hours for the last two rounds with the first two hours only on Paramount+ with CBS joining in progress.

== Tournaments ==
=== Current ===
Annual coverage

- Farmers Insurance Open (1999–present)
- Waste Management Phoenix Open (1973–present)
- AT&T Pebble Beach Pro-Am (1979–present)
- Genesis Invitational (2007–present)
- The Masters (1956–present), Major championship
- RBC Heritage (1970–present)
- Zurich Classic of New Orleans (2003–2019, 2021–present)
- Wells Fargo Championship (2003–2019, 2021–present)
- AT&T Byron Nelson (1979–1987, 1999–2019, 2021-present)
- PGA Championship (1958–1964, 1991–present), Major championship
- Charles Schwab Challenge (1979–present)
- Rocket Mortgage Classic (2019–present)
- Memorial Tournament (1976–1987, 1999–present)
- RBC Canadian Open (1970–1987, 2007–19, 2022-present)
- Travelers Championship (1970–1981, 1984–99, 2003–2005, 2007–2025)
- John Deere Classic (1999–2002, 2007–2019, 2021-present)
- 3M Open (2019–present)
- Wyndham Championship (1979–2002, 2007–present)
- Mexico Open (2022–present)
- Scottish Open (2022–present)

Tournaments alternated with NBC

During CBS Super Bowl and NBC Olympic years, a tournament on the affected network airs on the other network. NBC tournaments air on CBS during years of the Winter Olympic Closing Ceremony, and CBS tournaments air on NBC during years CBS has the Super Bowl. Furthermore, starting in the 2021-22 season, the two networks will alternate the PGA Tour Playoffs.

- CBS Tournaments airing on NBC because of Super Bowl
  - Phoenix Open: 2007, 2013, 2016, 2019, 2021
  - Los Angeles Open: 2010
- NBC Tournaments airing on CBS because of Winter Olympics
  - Honda Classic (2018)
  - WGC-Dell Match Play Championship (2010, 2014)
- Alternating Between the Two Networks Annually Starting in 2022 (CBS will have them in odd-numbered years)
  - St. Jude Championship (1979–1998, 2007–2021, 2023-), Playoff event
  - BMW Championship (2023-), Playoff event
  - Tour Championship (2023-), Playoff event

LPGA

- Dow Great Lakes Bay Invitational (2021–present)
- Meijer LPGA Classic (2021, 2023–present)
- Dana Open (2016, 2023–present)

=== Former ===
- QBE Shootout (1989–2006)
- Presidents Cup (1994, 1996 and 1998).
- Valero Texas Open (2016–2018)
- Quicken Loans National (2007–2015)
- AT&T Classic (2007–2008)
- Bob Hope Chrysler Classic (2003)
- The International (1986–2006)
- Buick Open (until 2006)
- Valspar Championship (2021)
- Palmetto Championship (2021)
- Travelers Championship (1970–1981, 1984–99, 2003–2005, 2007–2025)
- WGC FedEx St. Jude Invitational (1976–2021), World Golf championship
- Workday Charity Open (2020)

CBS has covered nearly every event on the PGA Tour schedule at some point in time, being the Tour's main television partner since the early 1970s.

Champions Tour

- Senior Players Championship (2003–2006)
- Liberty Mutual Legends of Golf (2007–2013)

LPGA Tour

- Kraft Nabisco Championship (2006–2010)
- LPGA Championship (1994–2005)
- Ginn Open (2006–2008)
- Walmart NW Arkansas Championship (2008)
- HSBC Women's World Match Play Championship (2005–2007)
- Cognizant Founders Cup (2022)
- ShopRite LPGA Classic (2022)
- CP Women's Open (2022)

=== Coverage ===
==== PGA ====
Year	Event	Location	Date	TV		Streaming	
Year	Event	Location	Date	Channel	Timings	Platform	Timings
2018	Honda Classic	PGA National Resort	24 February	CBS	3:00pm–6:00pm	—N/a	—N/a
2018	Honda Classic	PGA National Resort	25 February	CBS	3:00pm–6:00pm	—N/a	—N/a
2018	Masters Tournament	Augusta National Golf Club	7 April	CBS	3:00pm–7:30pm	—N/a	—N/a
2018	Masters Tournament	Augusta National Golf Club	8 April	CBS	2:00pm–7:00pm	—N/a	—N/a
2019	3M Open	TPC Twin Cities	6 July	CBS	3:00pm–6:00pm	—N/a	—N/a
2019	3M Open	TPC Twin Cities	7 July	CBS	3:00pm–6:00pm	—N/a	—N/a
2020	3M Open	TPC Twin Cities	25 July	CBS	3:00pm–6:00pm	—N/a	—N/a
2020	3M Open	TPC Twin Cities	26 July	CBS	3:00pm–6:00pm	—N/a	—N/a
2021	Masters Tournament	Augusta National Golf Club	10 April	CBS	3:00pm–7:00pm	Paramount+	3:00pm–7:00pm
2021	Masters Tournament	Augusta National Golf Club	11 April	CBS	2:00pm–7:00pm	Paramount+	2:00pm–7:00pm
2021	The Byron Nelson	TPC Craig Ranch	15 May	CBS	3:00pm–6:00pm	Paramount+	3:00pm–6:00pm
2021	The Byron Nelson	TPC Craig Ranch	16 May	CBS	3:00pm–6:00pm	Paramount+	3:00pm–6:00pm
2021	John Deere Classic	TPC Deere Run	10 July	CBS	3:00pm–6:00pm	Paramount+	3:00pm–6:00pm
2021	John Deere Classic	TPC Deere Run	11 July	CBS	3:00pm–6:00pm	Paramount+	3:00pm–6:00pm
2021	3M Open	TPC Twin Cities	24 July	CBS	3:00pm–6:00pm	Paramount+	3:00pm–6:00pm
2021	3M Open	TPC Twin Cities	25 July	CBS	3:00pm–6:00pm	Paramount+	3:00pm–6:00pm
2022	Phoenix Open	TPC Scottsdale	12 February	CBS	3:00pm–6:00pm	Paramount+	3:00pm–6:00pm
2022	Phoenix Open	TPC Scottsdale	13 February	CBS	3:00pm–6:00pm	Paramount+	3:00pm–6:00pm
2022	Masters Tournament	Augusta National Golf Club	9 April	CBS	3:00pm–7:00pm	Paramount+	3:00pm–7:00pm
2022	Masters Tournament	Augusta National Golf Club	10 April	CBS	2:00pm–7:00pm	Paramount+	2:00pm–7:00pm
2022	The Byron Nelson	TPC Craig Ranch	14 May	CBS	3:00pm–6:00pm	Paramount+	3:00pm–6:00pm
2022	The Byron Nelson	TPC Craig Ranch	15 May	CBS	3:00pm–6:00pm	Paramount+	3:00pm–6:00pm
2022	John Deere Classic	TPC Deere Run	2 July	CBS	3:00pm–6:00pm	Paramount+	3:00pm–6:00pm
2022	John Deere Classic	TPC Deere Run	3 July	CBS	3:00pm–6:00pm	Paramount+	3:00pm–6:00pm
2022	3M Open	TPC Twin Cities	23 July	CBS	3:00pm–6:00pm	Paramount+	3:00pm–6:00pm
2022	3M Open	TPC Twin Cities	24 July	CBS	3:00pm–6:00pm	Paramount+	3:00pm–6:00pm
2023	Phoenix Open	TPC Scottsdale	11 February	CBS	3:00pm–6:30pm	Paramount+	3:00pm–6:30pm
2023	Phoenix Open	TPC Scottsdale	12 February	CBS	3:00pm–6:00pm	Paramount+	3:00pm–6:00pm
2023	Masters Tournament	Augusta National Golf Club	8 April	CBS	3:00pm–7:00pm	Paramount+	3:00pm–7:00pm
2023	Masters Tournament	Augusta National Golf Club	9 April	CBS	2:00pm–7:00pm	Paramount+	2:00pm–7:00pm
2023	The Byron Nelson	TPC Craig Ranch	13 May	CBS	3:00pm–6:00pm	Paramount+	3:00pm–6:00pm
2023	The Byron Nelson	TPC Craig Ranch	14 May	CBS	3:00pm–6:00pm	Paramount+	3:00pm–6:00pm
2023	Rocket Mortgage Classic	Detroit Golf Club	1 July	CBS	3:00pm–6:00pm	Paramount+	3:00pm–6:00pm
2023	Rocket Mortgage Classic	Detroit Golf Club	2 July	CBS	3:00pm–6:00pm	Paramount+	3:00pm–6:00pm
2023	John Deere Classic	TPC Deere Run	8 July	CBS	3:00pm–6:00pm	Paramount+	3:00pm–6:00pm
2023	John Deere Classic	TPC Deere Run	9 July	CBS	3:00pm–6:00pm	Paramount+	3:00pm–6:00pm
2023	3M Open	TPC Twin Cities	29 July	CBS	3:00pm–6:00pm	Paramount+	3:00pm–6:00pm
2023	3M Open	TPC Twin Cities	30 July	CBS	3:00pm–6:00pm	Paramount+	3:00pm–6:00pm
2023	St. Jude Championship	TPC Southwind	12 August	CBS	3:00pm–6:00pm	Paramount+	3:00pm–6:00pm
2023	St. Jude Championship	TPC Southwind	13 August	CBS	2:00pm–6:00pm	Paramount+	2:00pm–6:00pm
2023	BMW Championship	Caves Valley Golf Club	19 August	CBS	3:00pm–6:00pm	Paramount+	3:00pm–6:00pm
2023	BMW Championship	Caves Valley Golf Club	20 August	CBS	2:00pm–6:00pm	Paramount+	2:00pm–6:00pm
2023	Tour Championship	East Lake Golf Club	26 August	CBS	3:00pm–7:00pm	Paramount+	3:00pm–7:00pm
2023	Tour Championship	East Lake Golf Club	27 August	CBS	1:30pm–6:00pm	Paramount+	1:30pm–6:00pm
2024	Masters Tournament	Augusta National Golf Club	13 April	CBS	3:00pm–7:00pm	Paramount+	3:00pm–7:00pm
2024	Masters Tournament	Augusta National Golf Club	14 April	CBS	2:00pm–7:00pm	Paramount+	2:00pm–7:00pm
2024	The Byron Nelson	TPC Craig Ranch	4 May	CBS	3:00pm–6:00pm	Paramount+	3:00pm–6:00pm
2024	The Byron Nelson	TPC Craig Ranch	5 May	CBS	3:00pm–6:00pm	Paramount+	3:00pm–6:00pm
2024	Rocket Mortgage Classic	Detroit Golf Club	29 June	CBS	3:00pm–6:00pm	Paramount+	3:00pm–6:00pm
2024	Rocket Mortgage Classic	Detroit Golf Club	30 June	CBS	3:00pm–6:00pm	Paramount+	3:00pm–6:00pm
2024	John Deere Classic	TPC Deere Run	6 July	CBS	3:00pm–6:00pm	Paramount+	3:00pm–6:00pm
2024	John Deere Classic	TPC Deere Run	7 July	CBS	3:00pm–6:00pm	Paramount+	3:00pm–6:00pm
2024	3M Open	TPC Twin Cities	27 July	CBS	3:00pm–6:00pm	Paramount+	3:00pm–6:00pm
2024	3M Open	TPC Twin Cities	28 July	CBS	3:00pm–6:00pm	Paramount+	3:00pm–6:00pm
2025	Phoenix Open	TPC Scottsdale	8 February	CBS	3:00pm–6:30pm	Paramount+	3:00pm–6:30pm
2025	Phoenix Open	TPC Scottsdale	9 February	CBS	3:00pm–6:00pm	Paramount+	3:00pm–6:00pm
2025	Masters Tournament	Augusta National Golf Club	12 April	CBS	2:00pm–7:00pm	Paramount+	12:00pm–7:00pm
2025	Masters Tournament	Augusta National Golf Club	13 April	CBS	2:00pm–7:00pm	Paramount+	12:00pm–7:00pm
2025	John Deere Classic	TPC Deere Run	5 July	CBS	3:00pm–6:00pm	Paramount+	3:00pm–6:00pm
2025	John Deere Classic	TPC Deere Run	6 July	CBS	3:00pm–6:00pm	Paramount+	3:00pm–6:00pm

== Theme music ==
CBS' PGA coverage has used several different pieces of music throughout its history. The current theme music was introduced in 2015 and was composed by Helmut Vonlichten. From 2003-2014, a Yanni composition, "Fanfare," has been used as the theme for the broadcasts. Past theme music has included "Take It From The Top" by Earl Klugh (mid-1980s) and "St. Ives Theme" by Lalo Schifrin (late 1970s to early 1980s). As with the Masters Tournament (see above), the PGA Championship uses its own distinct theme music, which has included "The Gift" by David Barrett (1991–2002) and "Burlingame" by E.S. Posthumus (2003–2014). CBS has also used "The Thrill of Victory" by E.S. Posthumus on its coverage of the Masters, along with several pieces by David Dachinger in a collection titled "Master Works".

In 2015, both the PGA Tour and PGA Championship coverage began using new theme music. The PGA Tour broadcasts began using "Tour of Champions" by Helmut Vonlichten as the theme music. The PGA Championship telecasts began using a separate Von Lichten composition, the name of which has not been revealed. TNT also uses a different version of the Von Lichten PGA Championship theme, composed by Trevor Rabin.

On Saturday, January 30, 2021, CBS debuted a new theme song ("Fairway to Greatness" by Helmut Vonlichten) for its coverage at Torrey Pines in San Diego, kicking of its 64th season of coverage.

Records
Preceded by None	The Masters Tournament network television broadcaster 1956–present	Succeeded by Incumbent
Preceded by None; ABC	PGA Championship network television broadcaster 1958–1964; 1991–present	Succeeded by ABC; Incumbent
