= 2024 FedEx Cup Playoffs =

Tournament information
- Dates: August 15 – September 1, 2024
- Location: TPC Southwind; Castle Pines Golf Club; East Lake Golf Club
- Tour: PGA Tour

Statistics
- Field: 70 for FedEx St. Jude Ch. 50 for BMW Championship; 30 for Tour Championship
- Prize fund: $100 million (bonus money)
- Winner's share: $25 million (bonus money)

Champion
- (United States) Scottie Scheffler
- −30

The 2024 FedEx Cup Playoffs, the series of three golf tournaments that determined the 2024 season champion on the U.S.-based PGA Tour, were played from August 15– September 1. It included the following three events:

- FedEx St. Jude Championship – TPC Southwind, Memphis, Tennessee
- BMW Championship – Castle Pines Golf Club, Castle Rock, Colorado
- Tour Championship – East Lake Golf Club, Atlanta, Georgia

This was the 18th FedEx Cup playoffs since their inception in 2007.

The point distributions can be seen here.

== Regular season rankings ==
The leading 10 players in the FedEx Cup regular-season standings qualified for a share of the $40 million Comcast Business Tour Top 10 bonus.

#	Player	Points	Events	Bonus ($)
1	(United States) Scottie Scheffler	5,993	16	8,000,000
2	(United States) Xander Schauffele	4,057	18	6,000,000
3	(Northern Ireland) Rory McIlroy	2,545	16	4,800,000
4	(United States) Collin Morikawa	2,456	18	4,400,000
5	(United States) Wyndham Clark	2,154	17	4,000,000
6	(Sweden) Ludvig Åberg	2,092	16	3,400,000
7	(United States) Sahith Theegala	2,037	21	2,800,000
8	(Japan) Hideki Matsuyama	1,899	16	2,400,000
9	(South Korea) Im Sung-jae	1,896	22	2,200,000
10	(Republic of Ireland) Shane Lowry	1,867	17	2,000,000

== Playoff tournaments ==
=== FedEx St. Jude Championship ===
The FedEx St. Jude Championship was played August 15–18. 70 players were eligible to play in the event. There was no second-round cut.

Hideki Matsuyama won by two strokes over Viktor Hovland and Xander Schauffele. World Number one and FedEx Cup points leader Scottie Scheffler finished in fourth. Three players played their way into the BMW Championship: Hovland (ranked 57 to 16), Eric Cole (54 to 46) and Nick Dunlap (67 to 48). Three players initially in the top 50 failed to advance: Tom Kim (ranked 43 to 51), Mackenzie Hughes (48 to 52) and Jake Knapp (50 to 59).

					FedEx Cup rank	
Place	Player	Score	To par	Winnings ($)	Before	After
1	(Japan) Hideki Matsuyama	65-64-64-70=263	−17	3,600,000	8	3
T2	(Norway) Viktor Hovland	70-63-66-66=265	−15	1,760,000	57	16
T2	(United States) Xander Schauffele	66-69-67-63=265	−15	1,760,000	2	2
4	(United States) Scottie Scheffler	66-65-69-66=266	−14	960,000	1	1
T5	(United States) Sam Burns	67-63-70-67=267	−13	760,000	29	18
T5	(United States) Nick Dunlap	67-65-66-69=267	−13	760,000	67	48
T7	(United States) Wyndham Clark	68-69-67-64=268	−12	645,000	5	6
T7	(Scotland) Robert MacIntyre	67-66-70-65=268	−12	645,000	17	12
9	(United States) Denny McCarthy	66-63-72-68=269	−11	580,000	45	30
T10	(United States) Billy Horschel	68-65-70-67=270	−10	520,000	23	19
T10	(Republic of Ireland) Séamus Power	67-70-66-67=270	−10	520,000	66	56

=== BMW Championship ===
The BMW Championship was played August 22–25. 50 players were eligible to play in the event. There was no second-round cut.

Keegan Bradley won by one stroke over Ludvig Åberg, Sam Burns, and Adam Scott. Four golfers played their way into the Tour Championship: Bradley (ranked 50 to 4), Scott (41 to 14), Tommy Fleetwood (31 to 22), and Chris Kirk (32 to 26). Four players initially ranked inside the top-30 failed to advance: Jason Day (ranked 25 to 33), Davis Thompson (26 to 34), Brian Harman (29 to 31), and Denny McCarthy (30 to 35).

					FedEx Cup rank	
Place	Player	Score	To par	Winnings ($)	Before	After
1	(United States) Keegan Bradley	66-68-70-72=276	−12	3,600,000	50	4
T2	(Sweden) Ludvig Åberg	72-63-71-71=277	−11	1,503,333	7	5
T2	(United States) Sam Burns	73-68-71-65=277	−11	1,503,333	18	9
T2	(Australia) Adam Scott	68-63-74-72=277	−11	1,503,333	41	14
T5	(Australia) Cameron Davis	72-70-72-66=280	−8	728,750	49	36
T5	(England) Tommy Fleetwood	72-69-70-69=280	−8	728,750	31	22
T5	(South Korea) Kim Si-woo	69-70-71-70=280	−8	728,750	44	32
T5	(United States) Xander Schauffele	69-73-67-71=280	−8	728,750	2	2
T9	(United States) Chris Kirk	73-68-71-69=281	−7	580,000	32	26
T9	(Sweden) Alex Norén	68-68-70-75=281	−7	580,000	45	37

=== Tour Championship ===
The Tour Championship was played August 29 – September 1. 30 golfers qualified for the tournament. There was no second-round cut.

Place	Player	Round scores	Starting score	Final score	FedEx Cup rank		Winnings ($)
Place	Player	Round scores	Starting score	Final score	Before	After	Winnings ($)
1	(United States) Scottie Scheffler	65-66-66-67=264	–10	−30	1	1	25,000,000
2	(United States) Collin Morikawa	66-63-67-66=262	–4	−26	7	2	12,500,000
3	(United States) Sahith Theegala	67-66-66-64=263	–3	−24	12	3	7,500,000
T4	(United States) Russell Henley	67-71-67-62=267	–2	−19	18	T4	4,833,333
T4	(United States) Xander Schauffele	70-64-71-68=273	–8	−19	2	T4	4,833,333
T4	(Australia) Adam Scott	66-67-68-67=268	–3	−19	14	T4	4,833,333
7	(South Korea) Im Sung-jae	69-68-68-64=269	–3	−18	11	7	2,750,000
8	(United States) Wyndham Clark	67-67-68-69=271	–4	−17	8	8	2,250,000
T9	(Republic of Ireland) Shane Lowry	69-69-65-68=271	–3	−16	13	T9	1,608,333
T9	(Japan) Hideki Matsuyama	70-70-68-67=275	–7	−16	3	T9	1,608,333
T9	(Northern Ireland) Rory McIlroy	69-69-68-66=272	–4	−16	6	T9	1,608,333

== Table of qualified players ==
Table key:

Win
Top-10 finish
Did not advance to next tournament
Played way into next tournament

	Player	Pre-Playoffs		FedEx St. Jude Championship		BMW Championship		Tour Championship		
	Player	Points	Rank	Finish	Rank after	Finish	Rank after	Starting score	Final score	Final rank
(United States)	Scottie Scheffler	5,993	1	4	1	T33	1	−10	−30	1
(United States)	Xander Schauffele	4,057	2	T2	2	T5	2	−8	−19	T4
(Northern Ireland)	Rory McIlroy	2,545	3	T68	5	T11	6	−4	−16	T9
(United States)	Collin Morikawa	2,456	4	T22	4	T28	7	−4	−26	2
(United States)	Wyndham Clark	2,154	5	T7	6	T13	8	−4	−17	8
(Sweden)	Ludvig Åberg*	2,092	6	T40	7	T2	5	−5	−12	16
(United States)	Sahith Theegala	2,037	7	T46	8	48	12	−3	−24	3
(Japan)	Hideki Matsuyama	1,899	8	1	3	WD	3	−7	−16	T9
(South Korea)	Im Sung-jae	1,896	9	T40	10	T11	11	−3	−18	7
(Republic of Ireland)	Shane Lowry	1,867	10	T50	11	T13	13	−3	−16	T9
(United States)	Patrick Cantlay	1,780	11	T12	9	T13	10	−4	−11	T17
(South Korea)	An Byeong-hun	1,755	12	T33	15	T13	16	−2	−8	T21
(United States)	Russell Henley	1,671	13	T30	17	T22	18	−2	−19	T4
(United States)	Tony Finau	1,635	14	T16	14	T13	15	−3	−6	T23
(United States)	Akshay Bhatia*	1,610	15	T12	13	45	19	−2	−5	26
(France)	Matthieu Pavon*	1,569	16	T46	20	T33	24	−1	−11	T17
(Scotland)	Robert MacIntyre*	1,535	17	T7	12	WD	20	−2	−11	T17
(Austria)	Sepp Straka	1,498	18	T61	24	T13	23	−1	−3	T27
(United States)	Justin Thomas	1,445	19	T30	22	T39	30	E	−14	T14
(United States)	Brian Harman	1,419	20	T50	29	25	31	–	–	31
(United States)	Tom Hoge	1,411	21	T46	28	T13	27	E	+3	T29
(South Africa)	Christiaan Bezuidenhout	1,406	22	T22	23	T33	29	E	+3	T29
(United States)	Billy Horschel	1,392	23	T10	19	T22	21	−1	−6	T23
(United States)	Davis Thompson*	1,385	24	T33	26	T41	34	–	–	34
(England)	Aaron Rai	1,381	25	T16	21	T43	28	E	−6	T23
(Australia)	Jason Day	1,345	26	T22	25	T33	33	–	–	33
(Canada)	Taylor Pendrith	1,324	27	T22	27	T13	25	−1	−14	T14
(United States)	Chris Kirk	1,318	28	T50	32	T9	26	E	−3	T27
(United States)	Sam Burns	1,265	29	T5	18	T2	9	−4	−15	T12
(Canada)	Corey Conners	1,249	30	T50	33	T22	39	–	–	39
(United States)	Cameron Young	1,227	31	T61	39	T43	44	–	–	44
(England)	Tommy Fleetwood	1,223	32	T22	31	T5	22	−1	−10	20
(Germany)	Stephan Jäger	1,207	33	T40	35	T39	43	–	–	43
(Belgium)	Thomas Detry	1,202	34	T46	40	T31	42	–	–	42
(United States)	Max Homa	1,194	35	70	43	T33	46	–	–	46
(United States)	J. T. Poston	1,193	36	T33	34	T33	41	–	–	41
(Canada)	Adam Hadwin	1,181	37	T50	42	T41	47	–	–	47
(South Korea)	Kim Si-woo	1,168	38	T50	44	T5	32	–	–	32
(United States)	Keegan Bradley	1,075	39	T59	50	1	4	−6	−8	T21
(England)	Matt Fitzpatrick	1,074	40	T18	36	T28	40	–	–	40
(United States)	Austin Eckroat*	1,069	41	T18	38	T46	45	–	–	45
(Sweden)	Alex Norén	1,067	42	T30	45	T9	37	–	–	37
(South Korea)	Tom Kim	1,051	43	T50	51	–	–	–	–	51
(Australia)	Cameron Davis	1,051	44	T40	49	T5	36	–	–	36
(United States)	Denny McCarthy	1,045	45	9	30	T26	35	–	–	35
(Australia)	Adam Scott	1,041	46	T18	41	T2	14	−3	−19	T4
(United States)	Max Greyserman*	1,041	47	T33	47	T28	48	–	–	48
(Canada)	Mackenzie Hughes	1,026	48	58	52	–	–	–	–	52
(United States)	Will Zalatoris	1,019	49	T12	37	T13	38	–	–	38
(United States)	Jake Knapp*	970	50	67	59	–	–	–	–	59
(United States)	Harris English	969	51	T61	57	–	–	–	–	57
(Canada)	Nick Taylor	969	52	65	58	–	–	–	–	58
(United States)	Patrick Rodgers	952	53	T33	54	–	–	–	–	54
(United States)	Eric Cole	948	54	T18	46	T46	50	–	–	50
(England)	Justin Rose	881	55	T22	55	–	–	–	–	55
(United States)	Ben Griffin	867	56	T50	61	–	–	–	–	61
(Norway)	Viktor Hovland	854	57	T2	16	T26	17	−2	−15	T12
(South Africa)	Erik van Rooyen	813	58	T33	62	–	–	–	–	62
(United States)	Maverick McNealy	808	59	T12	53	–	–	–	–	53
(United States)	Taylor Moore	803	60	66	64	–	–	–	–	64
(United States)	Peter Malnati	794	61	T59	65	–	–	–	–	65
(Australia)	Min Woo Lee*	783	62	T22	60	–	–	–	–	60
(United States)	Jordan Spieth	782	63	T68	66	–	–	–	–	66
(United States)	Mark Hubbard	737	64	T61	68	–	–	–	–	68
(United States)	Brendon Todd	720	65	T22	63	–	–	–	–	63
(Republic of Ireland)	Séamus Power	703	66	T10	56	–	–	–	–	56
(United States)	Nick Dunlap*	701	67	T5	48	T31	49	–	–	49
(Venezuela)	Jhonattan Vegas	685	68	T40	69	–	–	–	–	69
(Argentina)	Emiliano Grillo	684	69	T33	67	–	–	–	–	67
(France)	Victor Perez*	654	70	T40	70	–	–	–	–	70

* First-time Playoffs qualifier
