= Max Greyserman =

American professional golfer (born 1995)

Personal information
- Full name: Max Alexander Greyserman
- Nationality: United States
- Born: May 31, 1995 (age 31) Short Hills, New Jersey, U.S.
- Height: 5 ft 10 in (178 cm)
- Weight: 180 lb (82 kg)
- Spouse: Alyssa

Career
- Sport: Golf
- College: Duke University
- Turned professional: 2017
- Current tour: PGA Tour
- Former tour: Korn Ferry Tour
- Professional wins: 1
- Highest ranking: 30 (October 12, 2025) (as of October 25, 2026)

Best results in major championships
- Masters Tournament: T32: 2025
- PGA Championship: T14: 2026
- U.S. Open: T21: 2024
- The Open Championship: CUT: 2025, 2026

Max Alexander Greyserman (born May 31, 1995) is an American professional golfer on the PGA Tour. He played college golf at Duke University and played on the Korn Ferry Tour for four seasons. Greyserman earned his first PGA Tour card in 2023.

== Early and personal life ==
Greyserman was born in the Short Hills section of Millburn, New Jersey, to Alex and Elaine Greyserman. He is Jewish, and Russian was his first language. Both of his parents arrived in the U.S. as teenagers as refugees from Kyiv in the Soviet Union, in what is now modern-day Ukraine. They met when they were students at Rutgers University, where his father earned a Ph.D. His father is a hedge fund manager and a Columbia University math professor. His mother played tennis on scholarship at Rutgers University from 1990 to 1992. She was diagnosed with multiple sclerosis in 2009, and competed in the first U.S. Adaptive Open at Pinehurst in 2022 in the neurological impairment division, caddied by his father.

He has an older sister, Jacquie, who played college tennis at Emory University. He also has two younger brothers who both play golf, Dean and Reed. Reed won the 123rd New Jersey Amateur Championship in 2024, making him and Max—who won it in 2015—the first brothers to win the tournament in history.

Greyserman played varsity golf at Pine Crest School in South Florida as a seventh grader. He attended the school from grades five to eight. Greyserman then attended the Peddie School in New Jersey for high school, and led its team to three state championships.

Greyserman lives in Palm Beach Gardens, Florida, with his wife, Alyssa. They met in college, and she played college tennis.

== Amateur career ==
Greyserman first broke par at PGA National's Fazio course (then known as the Haig) at age 9, shooting a 71.

He won the 2012 Golf Pride Junior Classic, shooting 68-69-67, and was a 2012 American Junior Golf Association (AJGA) Rolex Junior Second Team All-American. In 2012, Greyserman recorded top-10 finishes at the Lessings AJGA Classic, the PING Invitational, the Puerto Rico Junior Open, and the New Jersey Amateur. In 2013, he won the New Jersey Junior Championship, was a finalist at St. Andrews Boys Open, was a semifinalist at the North and South Amateur, and was a member of the Wyndham Cup East Team.

=== College ===
Greyserman played four seasons for Duke University, where he studied public policy and economics, and graduated in 2017. In 2013–14, he posted a 74.9 stroke average, and shot a two-under 214 to tie for fourth at the Tar Heel Intercollegiate. In 2014, he also shot a six-under 207 and won the 94th New Jersey State Open, while caddied by his father.

In 2014–15, Greyserman posted a 75.3 stroke average at Duke. In 2015, he also won the 114th New Jersey Golf Association Amateur Championship at the Morris County Golf Club with a three-under 277.

Greyserman posted a 73.20 stroke average at Duke in 2015–16. He was named to the All-Atlantic Coast Conference Academic Team. He had two top-five finishes. In 2016–17, Greyserman had a 72.07 stroke average.

== Professional career ==
=== Korn Ferry Tour ===
Greyserman turned professional in 2017. In 2018–19, playing on the Korn Ferry Tour, he finished the season at No. 80 on the regular season points list. He recorded two top-10s, including a season-best T7 at the LECOM Suncoast Classic. He finished T6 in 2020 at the Korn Ferry Tour Championship.

In the 2020–21 season, Greyserman posted six top-10 finishes. In Korn Ferry Tour starts, he finished No. 46 in the regular season points standings. His highest finish of the season was a T4 at 16-under at the 2021 Visit Knoxville Open. He ranked fifth on the Tour in putting average, with 1.718 putts per green in regulation.

He suffered a wrist injury in 2022, a fractured lunate, necessitating surgery in April 2022. He thinks that the injury was the result of repetitive use, and anti-inflammatory medicines were eventually not able to mask the pain. Greyserman considered a different career path.

The following year in his fourth season on the Korn Ferry Tour, Greyserman finished No. 9 on the 2023 Korn Ferry Tour Points List, and earned his first PGA Tour card (top-30 from Points List). He posted five top-10s. He had two runner-up finishes, at The Ascendant and the Pinnacle Bank Championship.

=== PGA Tour ===
Greyserman earned his first PGA Tour card in 2023. He now golfs on the PGA Tour, and his coach is Jeff Smith. Greyserman has four top-10 finishes on the 2024 PGA Tour: T7 at the Texas Children's Houston Open, T4 at the Zurich Classic of New Orleans (playing with partner Nico Echavarría), solo 2nd at the 3M Open, where he finished one stroke behind winner Jhonattan Vegas, and 2nd at the Wyndham Championship.

In mid-June 2024, at the 124th U.S. Open at Pinehurst No. 2, Greyserman finished at 5-over par, 285, in a tie for 21st overall.

The following month he came in second with a 268 at the 3M Open at the TPC Twin Cities, in his 22nd PGA Tour start. He finished one shot behind Jhonattan Vegas, and won $882,900.

He finished second in August 2024 in the Wyndham Championship at Sedgefield Country Club, after shooting 69 and finishing two strokes back of Aaron Rai, who won the tournament. It was his best finish of the year to that point, out of 21 tournaments. Greyserman had been in the lead by four strokes after he had an eagle on the par-4 13th hole, but one hole later he had a quadruple-bogey 8 on the 14th hole. He became the first PGA Tour golfer to follow an eagle with a quad in 15 years in any round. While he birdied the par-5 15th hole, advancing to the lead by one shot, he then had a double bogey on the par-3 16th hole, and made par on his last two holes. Golfer Matt Kuchar was playing in the final group with Greyserman. Kuchar suddenly walked off the golf course after his tee shot on hole number 18, and marked his ball to finish the hole on the following day; he said that he did so because the sun had set, he felt it was too dark to continue, and by setting an example for Greyserman he was trying to help Greyserman hoping that Greyserman would likewise stop, and that Greyserman's performance thereafter on the 16th hole could have been avoided. Kuchar said that he thought that Greyserman had been treated unfairly by the officials at the tournament, who he thought should have postponed play a number of holes earlier because of the descending darkness, and that Greyserman should have won the tournament.

== Amateur wins ==
- 2012 Golf Pride Junior Classic
- 2013 New Jersey Junior
- 2015 New Jersey Amateur

== Professional wins ==
- 2014 New Jersey State Open (as an amateur)

== Playoff record ==
PGA Tour playoff record (0–1)

No.	Year	Tournament	Opponents	Result
1	2025	Rocket Classic	(United States) Chris Kirk, (South Africa) Aldrich Potgieter	Potgieter won with birdie on fifth extra hole Kirk eliminated by par on second hole

== Results in major championships ==
Tournament	2017	2018
Masters Tournament		
U.S. Open	CUT	
The Open Championship		
PGA Championship		

Tournament	2019	2020	2021	2022	2023	2024	2025	2026
Masters Tournament							T32	CUT
PGA Championship							T33	T14
U.S. Open						T21	T23	T43
The Open Championship		NT					CUT	CUT

Did not play

CUT = missed the half-way cut
"T" = tied
NT = no tournament due to the COVID-19 pandemic

=== Summary ===
Tournament	Wins	2nd	3rd	Top-5	Top-10	Top-25	Events	Cuts made
Masters Tournament	0	0	0	0	0	0	2	1
PGA Championship	0	0	0	0	0	1	2	2
U.S. Open	0	0	0	0	0	2	4	3
The Open Championship	0	0	0	0	0	0	2	0
Totals	0	0	0	0	0	3	10	6

- Most consecutive cuts made – 4 (2024 U.S. Open – 2025 U.S. Open)

== Results in The Players Championship ==
Tournament	2025	2026
The Players Championship	CUT	CUT

CUT = missed the half-way cut

== See also ==
- 2023 Korn Ferry Tour graduates
- List of Jewish golfers
