= Michael Thorbjornsen =

American professional golfer (born 2001)

Personal information
- Nationality: United States
- Born: September 16, 2001 (age 25) Cleveland, Ohio, U.S.

Career
- Sport: Golf
- College: Stanford University
- Turned professional: 2024
- Current tour: PGA Tour
- Professional wins: 1
- Highest ranking: 39 (August 9, 2026) (as of October 25, 2026)

Number of wins by tour
- PGA Tour: 1

Best results in major championships
- Masters Tournament: DNP
- PGA Championship: T41: 2025
- U.S. Open: 79th: 2019
- The Open Championship: T40: 2026

Michael Thorbjornsen (born September 16, 2001) is an American professional golfer who plays on the PGA Tour. He won the 2026 Rocket Classic for his first PGA Tour championship.

== Early life and family ==
Thorbjornsen was born in Cleveland, Ohio. He is the son of Thorbjørn Thorbjørnsen, a Norwegian, and Sandra Chiang, a Zimbabwean who was a golfer at Ursuline College. He first tried golf at two years old. His siblings are Victoria Lotus, Michelle Caprise and Teresa Corniche.

== Amateur career ==
Thorbjornsen won the 2018 U.S. Junior Amateur at Baltusrol Golf Club. The win qualified him for the 2019 U.S. Open at Pebble Beach Golf Links, where he made the cut, the first U.S. Junior Amateur champion to do so since the exemption was introduced. In 2020, Thorbjornsen graduated from Wellesley High School and enrolled at Stanford University, joining the Stanford Cardinal men's golf team.

He reached the quarterfinals of the 2020 U.S. Amateur at Bandon Dunes. He won the 2021 Western Amateur and Massachusetts Amateur, defeating 2017 U.S. Mid-Amateur champion Matt Parziale in the final match. He played on the 2022 Eisenhower Trophy and 2022 Arnold Palmer Cup teams.

Thorbjornsen qualified for his second U.S. Open in 2022 via an 8-for-3 playoff at Century and Old Oaks Country Clubs in Purchase, New York, after shooting 2-under 138 over 36 holes.

Thorbjornsen finished 4th in the 2022 Travelers Championship at the TPC River Highlands in Cromwell, Connecticut. Because Thorbjornsen was competing as an amateur, Chesson Hadley, who finished 5th, took home the $406,700 in prize money that would have otherwise gone to Thorbjornsen.

== Professional career ==
Thorbjornsen finished at the top of the PGA Tour University rankings for 2024, earning him a PGA Tour card for the remainder of 2024 and all of the 2025 season. He turned professional in June 2024. In his third start, he was runner-up at the John Deere Classic in July 2024. Thorbjornsen recorded another runner-up finish in April 2025, at the Corales Puntacana Championship, a stroke behind Garrick Higgo.

In August 2026, Thorbjornsen won the final edition of the Rocket Classic. He finished at 18 under par with a final-round 63 to claim his first career PGA Tour victory by two strokes over runner-up Xander Schauffele at the Detroit Golf Club.

== Amateur wins ==
- 2018 U.S. Junior Amateur, PING Invitational
- 2021 Massachusetts Amateur, Western Amateur
- 2022 OFCC Fighting Illini Invite
- 2023 Pac-12 Men's Golf Championships
- 2024 Cabo Collegiate Invitational

== Professional wins (1) ==
=== PGA Tour wins (1) ===
No.	Date	Tournament	Winning score	Margin of victory	Runner-up
1	Aug 2, 2026	Rocket Classic	−18 (69-64-66-63=262)	2 strokes	(United States) Xander Schauffele

== Results in major championships ==
Tournament	2019	2020	2021	2022	2023	2024	2025	2026
Masters Tournament								
PGA Championship							T41	CUT
U.S. Open	79			CUT	CUT			
The Open Championship		NT						T40

Did not play

CUT = missed the half-way cut
"T" = tied
NT = no tournament due to the COVID-19 pandemic

== U.S. national team appearances ==
- Junior Ryder Cup: 2018 (winners)
- Junior Presidents Cup: 2019 (winners)
- Arnold Palmer Cup: 2022
- Eisenhower Trophy: 2022
