= Debbie Steinbach =

American professional golfer (born 1953)

Personal information
- Full name: Debbie Meisterlin Steinbach
- Nationality: United States
- Born: January 28, 1953 (age 73) Fullerton, California
- Height: 5 ft 3 in (1.60 m)

Career
- Sport: Golf
- College: Cal State Fullerton
- Status: Professional
- Former tour: LPGA Tour (1975-1986)

Best results in LPGA major championships
- Chevron Championship: DNP
- Women's PGA C'ship: T41: 1984
- U.S. Women's Open: T29: 1983
- du Maurier Classic: T13: 1983

Debbie Meisterlin Steinbach (born January 28, 1953) is an American professional golfer, motivational speaker, golf instructor, broadcaster and author.

== Career ==
She was born Debbie Meisterlin in Fullerton, California. She attended California State University, Fullerton. She began playing on the LPGA Tour in 1975. Her best finish was a T-5 at the 1979 Florida Lady Citrus. After her marriage, she has competed under the name Debbie Steinbach.

Steinbach is a Class A teaching professional and Golf for Women Magazine "Top 50" instructor as well as a contributing editor, is a veteran of the LPGA Tour with eight course records and eleven holes-in-one to her credit. She is also the founder and CEO of women's golf clinic Venus Golf and the author of Venus on the Fairway, which highlights the physical and psychological differences between men and women in relation to golf instruction and the different teaching methods necessary for both genders. The company released an instructional DVD in 2004 titled, Venus on the Fundamentals of Golf. In his appraisal of the video, Arnold Palmer was quoted as saying: “Debbie has a unique gift for keeping her information simple and making learning fun." A veteran of more than five thousand individual lessons, Steinbach currently teaches at The Palms Country Club in La Quinta, California and makes her home in that same city.

Her experience as a broadcaster ranges from local radio in California's Coachella Valley to color commentary on national television for the likes of NBC-TV and ESPN. She has also been an infomercial spokesperson for Daiwa, Carbite and GolfGear.

Steinbach is currently a spokesperson for Rally For A Cure, a national breast cancer awareness organization.

== Personal life ==
As Debbie Meisterlin, she appeared with her family on an episode of Family Feud on Christmas Day 1981. They were shut out with no money by a family who went on to be undefeated.
