= 3M Open =

American professional golf tournament

Coordinates: 45.177°N 93.213°W

Tournament information
- Location: Blaine, Minnesota
- Established: 2019
- Course: TPC Twin Cities
- Par: 71
- Length: 7,431 yards (6,795 m)
- Tour: PGA Tour
- Format: Stroke play
- Prize fund: US$8,800,000
- Month played: July
- Website: 3mopen.com

Tournament record score
- Aggregate: 259 Jackson Koivun (2026)
- To par: −25 as above

Current champion
- (United States) Jackson Koivun

Location map
- Location in the United States Location in Minnesota

The 3M Open is a professional golf tournament in Minnesota on the PGA Tour, held at TPC Twin Cities in Blaine, a suburb north of Minneapolis. Announced by the PGA Tour in June 2018, the tournament debuted in 2019 on July 4–7. Minnesota-based company 3M is the title sponsor of the event.

It succeeded the 3M Championship, a PGA Tour Champions event for 26 years (1993–2018), held at TPC Twin Cities since 2001.

== Course ==
Hole	Yards	Par	Hole	Yards	Par
1	416	4	10	379	4
2	468	4	11	467	4
3	501	4	12	593	5
4	177	3	13	228	3
5	424	4	14	437	4
6	594	5	15	451	4
7	381	4	16	411	4
8	204	3	17	202	3
9	502	4	18	596	5
Out	3,667	35	In	3,764	36
Source:			Total	7,431	71

- The approximate average elevation is 900 feet (275 m) above sea level.

The course record of 59 was set in 2026 by Michael Kim; he had twelve birdies and six pars during the second round on July 24.

== Winners ==
Year	Winner	Score	To par	Margin of victory	Runner(s)-up	Purse (US$)	Winner's share ($)
2026	(United States) Jackson Koivun	259	−25	3 strokes	(United States) Scottie Scheffler	8,800,000	1,584,000
2025	(United States) Kurt Kitayama	261	−23	1 stroke	(United States) Sam Stevens	8,400,000	1,512,000
2024	(Venezuela) Jhonattan Vegas	267	−17	1 stroke	(United States) Max Greyserman	8,100,000	1,458,000
2023	(United States) Lee Hodges	260	−24	7 strokes	(Scotland) Martin Laird (United States) J. T. Poston (United States) Kevin Streelman	7,800,000	1,404,000
2022	(United States) Tony Finau	267	−17	3 strokes	(Argentina) Emiliano Grillo (South Korea) Im Sung-jae	7,500,000	1,350,000
2021	(United States) Cameron Champ	269	−15	2 strokes	(South Africa) Louis Oosthuizen (South Africa) Charl Schwartzel (Venezuela) Jhonattan Vegas	6,600,000	1,188,000
2020	(United States) Michael Thompson	265	−19	2 strokes	(United States) Adam Long	6,600,000	1,188,000
2019	(United States) Matthew Wolff	263	−21	1 stroke	(United States) Bryson DeChambeau (United States) Collin Morikawa	6,400,000	1,152,000
