= Rocket Classic =

Professional golf tournament on the PGA Tour

Coordinates: 42.4263°N 83.1262°W

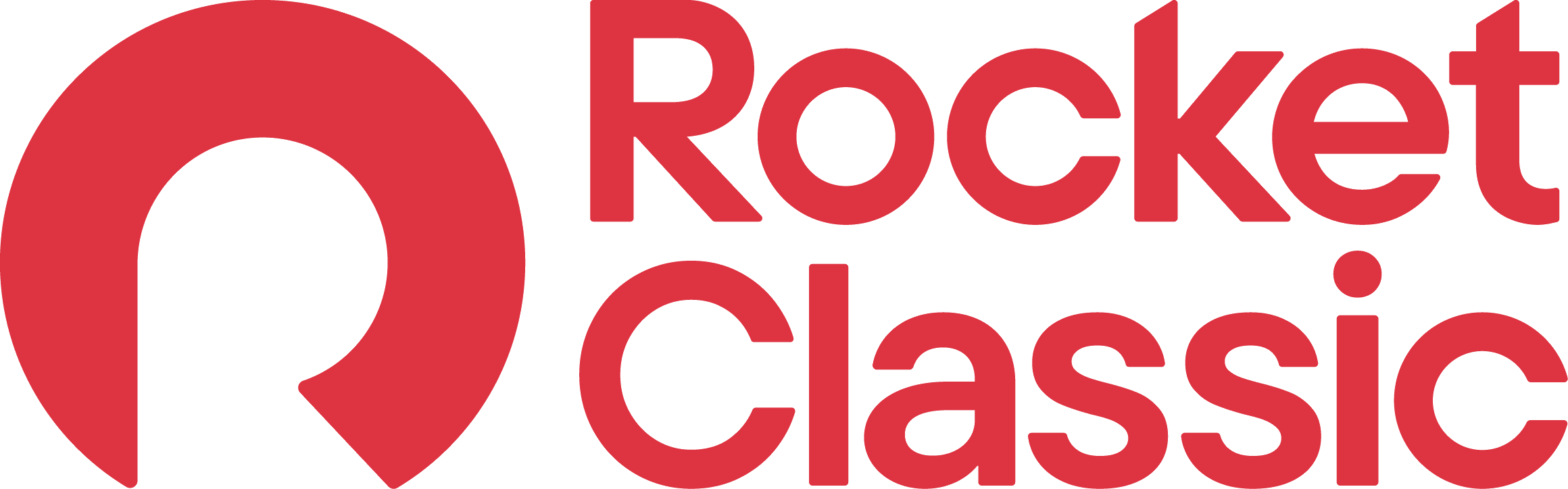

Tournament information
- Location: Detroit, Michigan
- Established: 2019
- Courses: Detroit Golf Club (North Course)
- Par: 70
- Length: 7,328 yards (6,701 m)
- Tour: PGA Tour
- Format: Stroke play
- Prize fund: US$10,000,000
- Month played: July/August
- Final year: 2026
- Website: rocketclassic.com

Tournament record score
- Aggregate: 262 Tony Finau (2022); 262 Michael Thorbjornsen (2026)
- To par: −26 Tony Finau (2022)

Final champion
- (United States) Michael Thorbjornsen

Location map
- Location in the United States Location in Michigan

The Rocket Classic (known as the Rocket Mortgage Classic through 2024) was a professional golf tournament in Michigan on the PGA Tour from 2019 to 2026. Held at the North Course of Detroit Golf Club, it replaced the Quicken Loans National on the PGA Tour schedule, and was the first PGA Tour event to be held completely within the Detroit city limits.

For the 2019 season, the event was part of the Open Qualifying Series, giving two non-exempt players entry into The Open Championship at Royal Portrush in Northern Ireland.

After the 2025 event, the course underwent a $16.1 million renovation and par was reduced from 72 to 70 for 2026; the overall length was reduced 42 yards (38 m) to 7,328 yards (6,701 m).

The Rocket Classic ended after the 2026 edition of the tournament after Rocket Companies declined to exercise its option for 2027.

== Course ==
North Course

Hole	Yards	Par	Hole	Yards	Par
1	402	4	10	422	4
2	494	4	11	246	3
3	373	4	12	481	4
4	592	5	13	413	4
5	156	3	14	561	5
6	501	4	15	163	3
7	505	4	16	456	4
8	349	4	17	537	4
9	205	3	18	472	4
Out	3,577	35	In	3,751	35
Source:			Total	7,328	70

- Prior to 2026, the course was par 72 with the seventh and seventeenth holes as par fives.
- The approximate average elevation is 650 feet (200 m) above sea level.

== Winners ==
Year	Winner	Score	To par	Margin of victory	Runner(s)-up	Purse (US$)	Winner's share ($)
Rocket Classic
2026	(United States) Michael Thorbjornsen	262	−18	2 strokes	(United States) Xander Schauffele	10,000,000	1,800,000
2025	(South Africa) Aldrich Potgieter	266	−22	Playoff	(United States) Max Greyserman (United States) Chris Kirk	9,600,000	1,728,000
Rocket Mortgage Classic
2024	(Australia) Cameron Davis (2)	270	−18	1 stroke	(United States) Akshay Bhatia (Australia) Min Woo Lee (England) Aaron Rai (United States) Davis Thompson	9,200,000	1,656,000
2023	(United States) Rickie Fowler	264	−24	Playoff	(Canada) Adam Hadwin (United States) Collin Morikawa	8,800,000	1,584,000
2022	(United States) Tony Finau	262	−26	5 strokes	(United States) Patrick Cantlay (Canada) Taylor Pendrith (United States) Cameron Young	8,400,000	1,512,000
2021	(Australia) Cameron Davis	270	−18	Playoff	(United States) Troy Merritt (Chile) Joaquín Niemann	7,500,000	1,350,000
2020	(United States) Bryson DeChambeau	265	−23	3 strokes	(United States) Matthew Wolff	7,500,000	1,350,000
2019	(United States) Nate Lashley	263	−25	6 strokes	(United States) Doc Redman	7,300,000	1,314,000
