= TPC Craig Ranch =

Golf course in McKinney, Texas, US

- Location within the United States Location within Texas
- 33.14°N 96.72°W

Club information
- Location: McKinney, Texas, U.S.
- Elevation: 650 feet (200 m) AMSL
- Established: 2004
- Type: Private
- Operator: PGA Tour TPC Network
- Tota holes: 18
- Tournaments: CJ Cup Byron Nelson (from 2021); Nationwide Tour Championship (2008, 2012)
- Greens: Bentgrass
- Fairways: Ryegrass
- Website: Official website
- Designed by: Tom Weiskopf
- Par: 71
- Length: 7,569 yards (6,921 m)
- Course rating: 76.7
- Slope rating: 147
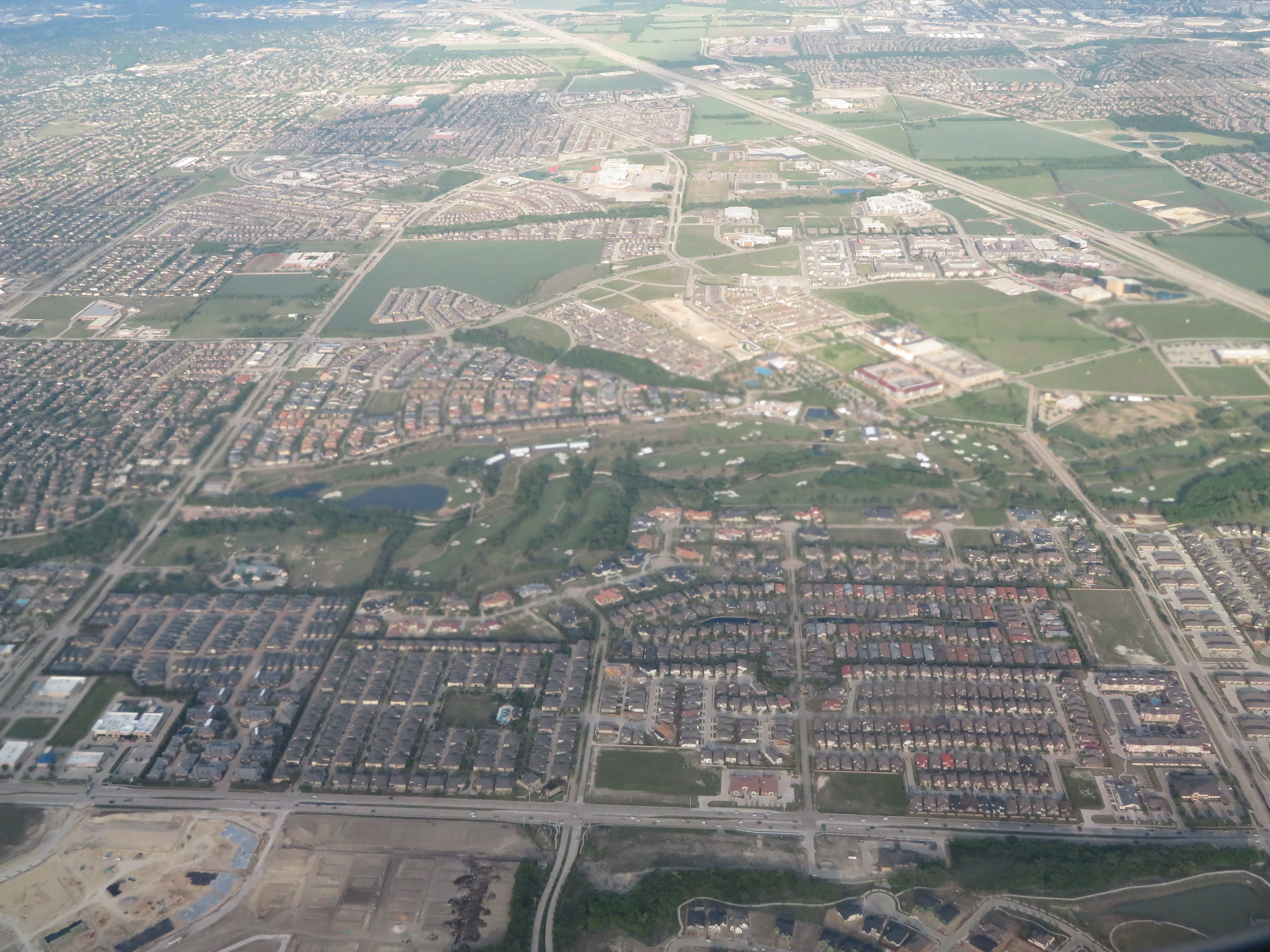
- Aerial view from the west in 2021

TPC Craig Ranch is a private golf club in the south central United States, located within the community of Craig Ranch in McKinney, Texas, north-northeast of Dallas.

Designed by major champion Tom Weiskopf, the championship golf course is a member of the Tournament Players Club network operated by the PGA Tour. It hosted the Nationwide Tour Championship, the season-ending tournament on the second tier Nationwide Tour (now Korn Ferry Tour), in 2008 and 2012.

The PGA Tour's CJ Cup Byron Nelson, once known as the Dallas Open, moved to TPC Craig Ranch in 2021 and is played in early May.

== Course ==
As set up for the 2025 CJ Cup Byron Nelson

Hole	Yards	Par	Hole	Yards	Par
1	431	4	10	491	4
2	466	4	11	467	4
3	420	4	12	493	4
4	219	3	13	512	4
5	635	5	14	362	4
6	361	4	15	216	3
7	232	3	16	492	4
8	509	4	17	147	3
9	564	5	18	552	5
Out	3,837	36	In	3,732	35
Source:			Total	7,569	71

- The approximate average elevation is 650 feet (200 m) above sea level
