= TPC Twin Cities =

Private golf club

- Location within the United States Location within Minnesota
- 45.177°N 93.213°W

Club information
- Location: Blaine, Minnesota, U.S.
- Elevation: 900 feet (275 m)
- Established: 2000; 26 years ago
- Type: Private
- Operator: PGA Tour TPC Network
- Total holes: 18
- Tournaments: 3M Championship (2001–2018); 3M Open (2019–present)
- Greens: Bentgrass
- Fairways: Bentgrass
- Website: Official website
- Designed by: Arnold Palmer (2000), with Tom Lehman; Renovation (2018): Steve Wenzloff
- Par: 72
- Length: 7,513 yards (6,870 m)
- Course rating: 77.3
- Slope rating: 145
- Course record: 59; Michael Kim (2026)

TPC Twin Cities is a private golf club in the north central United States, located within the subdivision of Deacon’s Walk in Blaine, Minnesota, a suburb north of Minneapolis.

Opened in 2000, the 18-hole championship golf course was designed by Arnold Palmer in consultation with Tom Lehman; it is a member of the Tournament Players Club network operated by the PGA Tour. Since 2019, it has hosted the 3M Open on the PGA Tour. From 2001 through 2018, it hosted the 3M Championship on the PGA Tour Champions.

== Course ==
TPC Twin Cities is maintained by superintendent Joseph Rolstad. The property was a sod farm before the golf course was built.

Average Green Size: 6,500 square feet (605 m^{2})

Total Property: 235 acres (0.95 km^{2})

Acres of Fairway: 28

Acres of Rough: 59

Number of Sand Bunkers: 72

Number of Water Hazards: 27

Number of Holes Water is in Play: 15

Soil Conditions: Sand

Water Sources: Well and holding lake

Drainage Conditions: Very good

=== Grass Types ===
The TPC Twin Cities golf course utilizes a variety of grass types to maintain its playing conditions:

- Fairways and tees: Bentgrass
- Greens: Bentgrass
- Rough: Kentucky bluegrass with Fescue

=== Back tees ===
Hole	Yards	Par	Hole	Yards	Par
1	426	4	10	379	4
2	468	4	11	467	4
3	546	5	12	593	5
4	177	3	13	228	3
5	424	4	14	437	4
6	594	5	15	451	4
7	381	4	16	411	4
8	204	3	17	229	3
9	502	4	18	596	5
Out	3,722	36	In	3,791	36
Source:			Total	7,513	72

- The approximate average elevation is 900 feet (275 m) above sea level.
- For the 3M Open, the third hole is a par four

The course record of 59 was set in 2026 by Michael Kim; he had twelve birdies and six pars during the second round of the 3M Open (par 71) on Friday, July 24.
