= Detroit Golf Club =

Golf course in Michigan, United States

Coordinates: 42°25′35″N 83°07′35″W

- Interactive map of Detroit Golf Club

Club information
- Location: Detroit, Michigan, U.S.
- Elevation: 650 feet (200 m) AMSL
- Established: 1899; 127 years ago
- Type: Private
- Total holes: 36
- Website: detroitgolfclub.org

South Course
- Designed by: Donald Ross
- Par: 68
- Length: 5,967 yards (5,456 m)
- Course rating: 68.7

North Course
- Designed by: Donald Ross
- Par: 72
- Length: 6,936 yards (6,342 m)
- Course rating: 73.6

The Detroit Golf Club (abbreviated to DGC) is a private golf club in Detroit, Michigan, located north of downtown near the University of Detroit Mercy and Palmer Woods Historic District. Its original six-hole course was designed by Bert Way, and was soon expanded to nine holes; noted course designer Donald Ross built the current 36-hole layout. The club grounds crew maintains two courses, North and the South, and the head professional is Carl Hays. Since 2019, Detroit Golf Club has hosted the Rocket Classic on the PGA Tour.

== History ==
The Detroit Golf Club was founded 127 years ago in 1899 by William R. Farrand and several of his friends. Originally, the club was limited to 100 members; they rented a 45-acre (0.18 km^{2}) plot of farmland at 6 Mile and Woodward, and a six-hole course layout was created. Three holes were added in 1900, making it a nine-hole course. The membership was increased to 200 in 1902, 135 acres (0.55 km^{2}) of land were purchased at 6 Mile and Hamilton, and an 18-hole course was developed.

The club formally opened in 1906, and membership fees were raised to $250. Additional property was bought in 1913, and Donald Ross was asked to survey the property. He determined that 36 holes could be built on the land; Horace Rackham paid $100,000 for the 36-hole course to be built to the DGC at a cost.

In 1916, Albert Kahn started construction on a new clubhouse, which was completed in 1918. Alec Ross, brother of the course designer, became club professional, a position he held until 1945.

Club membership was increased to 650 in 1922, and they decided to stay open year-round. In 1929, the Fred Wardell Caddy House was built, at a cost of around $40,000.

During World War II, club activities were limited due to gas rationing, and in 1945, Alec Ross retired as club professional. Tour star Horton Smith was hired as the club pro, and he was elected into the Professional Golfers Association Hall of Fame in 1959. Smith died at age 55 in 1963, and local Walter Burkemo, winner of the 1953 PGA Championship, was hired.

The club added new amenities: tennis courts, a cart garage, and a crystal dining room. Burkemo was succeeded by George Bayer; the current club pro is Josh Upson. The club also contains a pool for members, and sponsors a swim team.

== Location ==
The club, located on the North side of Detroit, near such landmarks as Palmer Park and the University of Detroit Mercy, is separated from the former Palmer Park Golf Course by Pontchartrain Blvd. on the East, and Fairway Drive on the West. It shares a small border with 7 Mile on the North, and a large border with McNichols (6 Mile) on the South.

== Major tournaments ==
- 1911 Western Amateur
- 1992 U.S. Mid-Amateur
- 2019–present Rocket Classic

== Club Tournaments ==
Men's

- Men's Golf League
- Men's Ringer Board
- Men's Golf Fund
- Men's Opening Day
- Men's Old Pal
- President's Cup
- Horton Smith Tournament
- Men's Spring Medal Play
- The Whistler
- The Hummer
- Men's Club Championship
- Men's Senior Club Championship
- Men's Member-Member
- Men's Closing Day
- Junior Boys Club Championship

Women's

- Women's Corkscrew Opener
- Women's 18-Hole League
- Girls Night Out
- Women's Detroit Metro League
- Four Girl Team
- Ladies' Cup
- Women's Medal Play
- Women's Texas Scramble I & II
- Sundancer Invitational
- Grandmother-Senior Event
- Women's Club Championship
- Women's Member-Member
- Women's Ryder Cup
- Women's Closing Day- 2Tall/2Small

Couple's

- Nine and Dine
- Couple's Golf League
- Memorial Day Scramble
- DGC Caddie Scholarship Event
- Patriot Day
- Labor Day Scramble
- Husband-Wife Championship

Family Golf Events

- Mother's Day Tournament
- Father's Day Tournament
- Junior Golf

Changes for the PGA Tour Event On October 11, 2010, the Detroit Golf Club bid for the Rocket Mortgage Classic on the PGA Tour. The event has been hosted on the North course from 2019 through 2022. To prepare several of the holes were lengthened, and trees around the greens and tee boxes have also been removed. Parking is made available in the adjacent Palmer Park and the surrounding area, with the University of Detroit Mercy and the Michigan State Fairgrounds serving as other possible parking locations. In 2022, Detroit Golf Club announced golf architect Tyler Rae would look at drainage improvements.

== Courses ==
Both courses have a snack shack next to a combined tee. The 13th for the South and the 14th for the North. Water hazards can be found on the North and South.

=== North Course ===
The North Course is longer than the South by 870 yards. According to the original Donald Ross design, the 8th tee should be the 1st tee, and the 7th tee should be the 9th. Distinctive features include the bent tree between the 7th and 8th hole. As a sapling, Native Americans bent the tree to serve as a marker for the original Indian Trail between Detroit and Pontiac. The original clubhouse was situated where the 12th green is today, pipes can still be seen a distance behind the green.

=== South Course ===
The South Course has two combined tees. The 3rd and 9th, and the 5th and the 8th. The 10th tee is the most elevated at the DGC. In the early 1980s, the 13th tee was combined with the 14th tee on the North in front of the shack.

== Miscellaneous ==
- The club has a free membership for the Mayor of Detroit.
- Many Detroit stars such as Justin Verlander, Gerald Laird, Jim Leyland, Jerome Bettis, Jim Schwartz, and many others have or still do play there.
- The club has tennis courts and a pool, for the tennis and swimming teams, respectively.
- The club has a caddie program that participates in The Evans Scholars Foundation
- The club became racially integrated in 1986.

== See also ==
- Country Club of Detroit
- Sports in Detroit
