= 2024 PGA Tour =

Golf tour season

2024 PGA Tour season
- Duration: January 4, 2024 – November 24, 2024
- Number of official events: 47
- Most wins: (United States) Scottie Scheffler (7)
- FedEx Cup: (United States) Scottie Scheffler
- Money list: (United States) Scottie Scheffler
- Player of the Year: (United States) Scottie Scheffler
- Rookie of the Year: (United States) Nick Dunlap

The 2024 PGA Tour was the 109th season of the PGA Tour, the main professional golf tour in the United States. It was also the 56th season since separating from the PGA of America, and the 18th edition of the FedEx Cup.

== Changes for 2024 ==
When the 2024 PGA Tour schedule was announced in August 2023, there were many changes from previous seasons, including:

- Return to a calendar-based schedule, starting in January.
- "Designated events" were rebranded as "signature events", with smaller fields and several changes in format and eligibility.
  - The top 50 in the previous seasons FedEx Cup standings are eligible for all signature events, along with leading players during the season to date and in recent tournaments, tournament winners, PGA Tour members in the top 30 of the Official World Golf Ranking, and sponsors exemptions. Leading players in the previous season's fall events are eligible for the first two signature events.
  - Unlike 2022–23, there is no requirement for the leading players to play in signature events.
  - The AT&T Pebble Beach Pro-Am replaced the WM Phoenix Open as a signature event, with a reduced field of 80 professionals, and amateurs only competing on the first two days.
  - The only signature events to retain a 36-hole cut were the Genesis Invitational, the Arnold Palmer Invitational and the Memorial Tournament.
  - FedEx Cup points for signature events were increased to 700 for the winner (from 550 and 500 in 2022–23).
- The prize pool for the Comcast Business Tour Top 10 (leading regular-season FedEx Cup point earners) was doubled to $40 million.
- The prize for winning the FedEx Cup was increased to $25 million (from $18 million).
- The conditional category is reshuffled with the past champion and veteran member categories, rather than being reshuffled on its own.

== Schedule ==
The following table lists official events during the 2024 season.

Date	Tournament	Location	Purse (US$)	Winner(s) (Note: The number in parentheses after each winner's name is the number of PGA Tour events they had won up to and including that tournament. This information is only shown for PGA Tour members.)	OWGR points	Other tours (Note: EUR − European Tour; JPN − Japan Golf Tour.)	Notes
Jan 7	The Sentry	Hawaii	20,000,000	(United States) Chris Kirk (6)	60.00		Signature event
Jan 14	Sony Open in Hawaii	Hawaii	8,300,000	(United States) Grayson Murray (2)	48.96		
Jan 21	The American Express	California	8,400,000	(United States) Nick Dunlap (a) (1)	55.69		
Jan 27	Farmers Insurance Open	California	9,000,000	(France) Matthieu Pavon (1)	55.16		
Feb 4	AT&T Pebble Beach Pro-Am	California	20,000,000	(United States) Wyndham Clark (3)	71.77		Signature event
Feb 11	WM Phoenix Open	Arizona	8,800,000	(Canada) Nick Taylor (4)	55.84		
Feb 18	Genesis Invitational	California	20,000,000	(Japan) Hideki Matsuyama (9)	68.54		Signature event
Feb 25	Mexico Open	Mexico	8,100,000	(United States) Jake Knapp (1)	31.11		
Mar 4 (Note: Monday finish due to weather delays.)	Cognizant Classic	Florida	9,000,000	(United States) Austin Eckroat (1)	50.58		
Mar 10	Arnold Palmer Invitational	Florida	20,000,000	(United States) Scottie Scheffler (7)	67.97		Signature event
Mar 10	Puerto Rico Open	Puerto Rico	4,000,000	(United States) Brice Garnett (2)	20.36		Additional event
Mar 17	The Players Championship	Florida	25,000,000	(United States) Scottie Scheffler (8)	80		Flagship event
Mar 24	Valspar Championship	Florida	8,400,000	(United States) Peter Malnati (2)	50.06		
Mar 31	Texas Children's Houston Open	Texas	9,100,000	(Germany) Stephan Jäger (1)	44.49		
Apr 7	Valero Texas Open	Texas	9,200,000	(United States) Akshay Bhatia (2)	55.63		
Apr 14	Masters Tournament	Georgia	20,000,000	(United States) Scottie Scheffler (9)	100		Major championship
Apr 21	Corales Puntacana Championship	Dominican Republic	4,000,000	(United States) Billy Horschel (8)	24.13		Additional event
Apr 22 (Note: Monday finish due to weather delays.)	RBC Heritage	South Carolina	20,000,000	(United States) Scottie Scheffler (10)	63.91		Signature event
Apr 28	Zurich Classic of New Orleans	Louisiana	8,900,000	(Republic of Ireland) Shane Lowry (3) and (Northern Ireland) Rory McIlroy (25)	n/a		Team event
May 5	CJ Cup Byron Nelson	Texas	9,500,000	(Canada) Taylor Pendrith (1)	41.82		
May 12	Wells Fargo Championship	North Carolina	20,000,000	(Northern Ireland) Rory McIlroy (26)	60.84		Signature event
May 12	Myrtle Beach Classic	South Carolina	4,000,000	(United States) Chris Gotterup (1)	25.34		New additional event
May 19	PGA Championship	Kentucky	18,500,000	(United States) Xander Schauffele (8)	100		Major championship
May 26	Charles Schwab Challenge	Texas	9,100,000	(United States) Davis Riley (2)	52.05		Invitational
Jun 2	RBC Canadian Open	Canada	9,400,000	(Scotland) Robert MacIntyre (1)	43.80		
Jun 9	Memorial Tournament	Ohio	20,000,000	(United States) Scottie Scheffler (11)	70.12		Signature event
Jun 16	U.S. Open	North Carolina	21,500,000	(United States) Bryson DeChambeau (9)	100		Major championship
Jun 23	Travelers Championship	Connecticut	20,000,000	(United States) Scottie Scheffler (12)	66.04		Signature event
Jun 30	Rocket Mortgage Classic	Michigan	9,200,000	(Australia) Cameron Davis (2)	41.03		
Jul 7	John Deere Classic	Illinois	8,000,000	(United States) Davis Thompson (1)	38.33		
Jul 14	Genesis Scottish Open	Scotland	9,000,000	(Scotland) Robert MacIntyre (2)	65.37	EUR (Note: European Tour Rolex Series)	
Jul 14	ISCO Championship	Kentucky	4,000,000	(England) Harry Hall (1)	25.13	EUR	Additional event
Jul 21	The Open Championship	Scotland	17,000,000	(United States) Xander Schauffele (9)	100		Major championship
Jul 21	Barracuda Championship	California	4,000,000	(United States) Nick Dunlap (2)	27.34	EUR	Additional event
Jul 28	3M Open	Minnesota	8,100,000	(Venezuela) Jhonattan Vegas (4)	40.63		
Aug 12 (Note: Monday finish due to weather delays.)	Wyndham Championship	North Carolina	7,900,000	(England) Aaron Rai (1)	50.16		
Aug 18	FedEx St. Jude Championship	Tennessee	20,000,000	(Japan) Hideki Matsuyama (10)	70.04		FedEx Cup playoff event
Aug 25	BMW Championship	Colorado	20,000,000	(United States) Keegan Bradley (7)	59.70		FedEx Cup playoff event
Sep 1	Tour Championship	Georgia	n/a (Note: The Tour Championship has no stand-alone purse and does not carry official money; the tournament directly determines the assignment of the FedEx Cup bonus pool money, including US$25 million to the winner.)	(United States) Scottie Scheffler (13)	47.63 (Note: OWGR points at the Tour Championship were awarded based on aggregate scores only (see Tour Championship format). Collin Morikawa had the lowest aggregate score and was awarded with the 47.63 points. Scheffler, who had the third-lowest aggregate score, received 18.10 points.)		FedEx Cup playoff event
Sep 15	Procore Championship	California	6,000,000	(United States) Patton Kizzire (3)	36.46		FedEx Cup Fall
Oct 6	Sanderson Farms Championship	Mississippi	7,600,000	(Taiwan) Kevin Yu (1)	30.90		FedEx Cup Fall
Oct 13	Black Desert Championship	Utah	7,500,000	(United States) Matt McCarty (1)	28.79		New tournament FedEx Cup Fall
Oct 20	Shriners Children's Open	Nevada	7,000,000	(United States) J. T. Poston (3)	35.85		FedEx Cup Fall
Oct 27	Zozo Championship	Japan	8,500,000	(Colombia) Nico Echavarría (2)	40.43	JPN (Note: Japan Golf Tour unofficial event)	Limited-field event FedEx Cup Fall
Nov 10	World Wide Technology Championship	Mexico	7,200,000	(United States) Austin Eckroat (2)	26.07		FedEx Cup Fall
Nov 17	Butterfield Bermuda Championship	Bermuda	6,900,000	(Puerto Rico) Rafael Campos (1)	22.05		FedEx Cup Fall
Nov 24	RSM Classic	Georgia	7,600,000	(United States) Maverick McNealy (1)	38.65		FedEx Cup Fall

=== Unofficial events ===
The following events are sanctioned by the PGA Tour, but do not carry FedEx Cup points or official money, nor are wins official.

Date	Tournament	Location	Purse ($)	Winner(s)	OWGR points	Notes
Aug 4	Olympic Games	France	n/a	(United States) Scottie Scheffler	51.14	Limited-field event
Sep 29	Presidents Cup	Canada	n/a	Team USA	n/a	Team event
Dec 8	Hero World Challenge	Bahamas	5,000,000	(United States) Scottie Scheffler	30.55	Limited-field event
Dec 15	Grant Thornton Invitational	Florida	4,000,000	(United States) Jake Knapp and (Thailand) Patty Tavatanakit	n/a	Team event
Dec 22	PNC Championship	Florida	1,085,000	(Germany) Bernhard Langer and son Jason Langer	n/a	Team event

== FedEx Cup ==
=== Points distribution ===
The distribution of points for 2024 PGA Tour events were as follows:

Finishing position	1st	2nd	3rd	4th	5th	6th	7th	8th	9th	10th	20th	30th	40th	50th	60th
Majors & Players Championship	750	400	350	325	300	275	250	225	200	175	100	50	21	13	8
Signature events	700	400	350	325	300	275	250	225	200	175	100	50	21	13	8
Other PGA Tour events	500	300	190	135	110	100	90	85	80	75	45	28	16	9	5
Team event (each player)	400	163	105	88	78	68	59	54	50	46	17	5	2	0	0
Additional events	300	165	105	80	65	60	55	50	45	40	28	17	10	5	3
Playoff events	2,000	1,200	760	540	440	400	360	340	320	300	180	112	64	34	20

Tour Championship starting score (to par), based on position in the FedEx Cup rankings after the BMW Championship:

Position	1st	2nd	3rd	4th	5th	6th–10th	11th–15th	16th–20th	21st–25th	26th–30th
Starting score	−10	−8	−7	−6	−5	−4	−3	−2	−1	E

=== Final standings ===
For full rankings, see 2024 FedEx Cup Playoffs.

Final FedEx Cup standings of the 30 qualifiers for the Tour Championship:

Pos.	Player		Majors & The Players					Signature events								Top 10s in other PGA Tour events						Regular season points	Playoffs (Note: The top 70 point scorers in the regular season retain their tour card for the following season, and qualify for the FedEx St. Jude Championship. The top 50 points scorers after FedEx St. Jude Championship qualify for the BMW Championship.)		Total points	Tour C'ship (Note: The top 30 point scorers after the BMW Championship qualify for the Tour Championship. Each player begins with a score adjustment to par determined by their point ranking, the lowest scorers in the Tour Championship in addition to this adjustment win the FedEx Cup.)		Tmts	Money ($m) (Note: In addition to tournament prize money, the top 10 regular season point scorers receive a share of a $40m bonus, and the $100m FedEx Cup postseason bonus money is distributed based upon standings after the Tour Championship.)		
Pos.	Nat.	Name	Ply	Mas	PGA	USO	Opn	Sen	PB	Gen	API	Htg	WF	Mem	Trav	1	2	3	4	5	6	Regular season points	FStJ	BMW	Total points	Start	Final	Tmts	Basic	CB Top10	FedEx Bonus
1	(United States)	Scheffler	1	1	T8	T41	T7	T5	T6	T10	1	1	•	1	1	T3	T2	T2				5,993	4	T33	6,615	–10	–30	19	29.23	8.00	25.00
2	(United States)	Morikawa	T45	T3	T4	T14	T16	T5	T14	T19	CUT	9	T16	2	T13	4	T4					2,456	T22	T28	2,714	–4	–26	21	8.38	4.40	12.50
3	(United States)	Theegala	T9	T45	T12	T32	CUT	2	T20	T37	T6	2	T52	T12	T48	5	T4	T6				2,037	T46	48	2,114	–3	–24	24	8.47	2.80	7.50
T4	(United States)	Henley	CUT	T38	T23	T7	5	T52	T58	T24	T4	T12	T10	T27	T48	T4	4					1,671	T30	T22	1,933	–2	–19	19	5.08		4.83
T4	(United States)	Schauffele	T2	8	1	T7	1	T10	T54	T4	T25	T18	2	T8	T13	T3	T9	T5				4,057	T2	T5	5,422	–8	–19	21	18.39	6.00	4.83
T4	(Australia)	Scott	T45	T22	CUT	T32	T10	•	T20	T19	CUT	•	T29	•	T39	T8	2					1,041	T18	T2	2,058	–3	–19	19	4.75		4.83
7	(South Korea)	Im	T31	CUT	CUT	CUT	T7	T5	T66	T44	T18	T12	T4	T8	T3	T9	T4					1,896	T40	T11	2,220	–3	–18	25	6.29	2.20	2.75
8	(United States)	Clark	T2	CUT	CUT	T56	CUT	T29	1	CUT	2	T3	T47	CUT	T9	T10						2,154	T7	T13	2,708	–4	–17	20	10.90	4.00	2.25
T9	(Republic of Ireland)	Lowry	T19	T43	T6	T19	6	•	•	•	3	T64	T47	49	T9	T4	1					1,867	T50	T13	2,099	–3	–16	20	6.10	2.00	1.61
T9	(Japan)	Matsuyama	T6	T38	T35	6	T66	58	T71	1	T12	•	•	T8	T23	T7						1,899	1	WD	3,899	–7	–16	19	11.26	2.40	1.61
T9	(Northern Ireland)	McIlroy	T19	T22	T12	2	CUT	•	T66	T24	T21	T33	1	T15	•	3	1	T4	T4			2,545	T68	T11	2,829	–4	–16	19	10.89	4.80	1.61
T12	(United States)	Burns	T45	CUT	CUT	T9	T31	T33	10	T10	T30	T44	T13	T15	T55	T6	T3	T10				1,265	T5	T2	2,518	–4	–15	21	6.19		1.00
T12	(Norway)	Hovland	T62	CUT	3	CUT	CUT	T22	T58	T19	T36	•	T24	T15	T20							854	T2	T26	1,967	–2	–15	16	4.62		1.00
T14	(Canada)	Pendrith	CUT	•	CUT	T16	•	•	•	•	•	•	T10	T33	T23	T10	T9	1	5			1,324	T22	T13	1,668	–1	–14	24	4.80		0.91
T14	(United States)	Thomas	CUT	CUT	T8	CUT	T31	•	T6	CUT	T12	T5	T21	T33	T5	T3						1,445	T30	T39	1,617	E	–14	19	5.22		0.91
16	(Sweden)	Åberg	8	2	CUT	T12	CUT	T47	2	T19	T25	T10	•	T5	T27	T9	T4					2,092	T40	T2	2,980	–5	–12	19	9.83	3.40	0.80
T17	(United States)	Cantlay	T68	T22	T53	T3	T25	T12	T11	T4	T36	T3	T29	CUT	T5							1,780	T12	T13	2,221	–4	–11	19	6.28		0.76
T17	(Scotland)	MacIntyre	CUT	•	T8	CUT	T50	•	•	•	•	•	•	•	T16	T6	T8	1	1			1,535	T7	WD	1,885	–2	–11	25	5.40		0.76
T17	(France)	Pavon	CUT	T12	CUT	5	T50	•	3	•	T52	T49	67	CUT	T16	T7	1					1,569	T46	T33	1,690	–1	–11	19	5.25		0.76
20	(England)	Fleetwood	T35	T3	T26	T16	CUT	T47	T31	T10	CUT	T49	T13	T20	15	T7						1,223	T22	T5	1,747	–1	–10	19	4.61		0.72
T21	(South Korea)	An	CUT	T16	T43	CUT	T13	4	T31	T16	T8	67	3	T22	WD	T2	T4					1,755	T33	T13	2,040	–2	–8	22	5.87		0.66
T21	(United States)	Bradley	CUT	T22	T18	T32	CUT	T45	T11	CUT	T36	T55	T21	T43	T39	T2	T2					1,075	T59	1	3,096	–6	–8	22	6.88		0.66
T23	(United States)	Finau	T45	T55	T18	T3	CUT	T38	T47	T19	•	T12	T52	T8	T5	T6	T2					1,635	T16	T13	2,047	–3	–6	22	5.71		0.62
T23	(United States)	Horschel	CUT	•	T8	T41	T2	•	•	•	•	•	T52	T15	T55	T9	T7	1	T7			1,392	T10	T22	1,838	–1	–6	23	5.04		0.62
T23	(England)	Rai	T35	•	T39	T19	T75	•	•	•	•	•	•	•	•	T7	T4	T2	T7	T4	1	1,381	T16	T43	1,639	E	–6	25	4.61		0.62
26	(United States)	Bhatia	CUT	T35	CUT	T16	CUT	T14	•	•	•	T18	42	T22	T5	1	T2					1,610	T12	45	1,891	–2	–5	26	5.34		0.59
T27	(United States)	Kirk	T26	T16	CUT	T26	T31	1	T26	CUT	T44	T10	T43	CUT	T63							1,318	T50	T9	1,656	E	–3	21	6.06		0.58
T27	(Austria)	Straka	T16	T16	CUT	T56	T22	T12	T26	CUT	T57	T5	T8	T5	T23	T5						1,498	T61	T13	1,721	–1	–3	23	4.60		0.58
T29	(South Africa)	Bezuidenhout	T13	•	CUT	T32	CUT	•	T20	T24	T44	T28	T16	4	T23	T9						1,406	T22	T33	1,628	E	+3	23	5.03		0.56
T29	(United States)	Hoge	T54	•	T23	CUT	T72	T38	T6	8	T12	T18	T38	T45	T3							1,411	T46	T13	1,655	E	+3	26	4.84		0.56

Win
Top 10
Made cut
Missed cut
Withdrew or disqualified
• Did not play

== Money list ==
The money list was based on prize money won during the season, calculated in U.S. dollars.

Position	Player	Prize money ($)
1	(United States) Scottie Scheffler	29,228,357
2	(United States) Xander Schauffele	18,385,320
3	(Japan) Hideki Matsuyama	11,257,969
4	(United States) Wyndham Clark	10,901,416
5	(Northern Ireland) Rory McIlroy	10,893,790
6	(Sweden) Ludvig Åberg	9,833,547
7	(United States) Sahith Theegala	8,474,215
8	(United States) Collin Morikawa	8,383,572
9	(United States) Keegan Bradley	6,879,455
10	(South Korea) Im Sung-jae	6,286,205

== Awards ==
Award	Winner	Ref.
Player of the Year (Jack Nicklaus Trophy)	(United States) Scottie Scheffler	
Rookie of the Year (Arnold Palmer Award)	(United States) Nick Dunlap	
Scoring leader (Byron Nelson Award)	(United States) Scottie Scheffler	
PGA Tour Courage Award	(United States) Gary Woodland	

== See also ==
- 2024 Korn Ferry Tour
- 2024 PGA Tour Champions season
