= Children's programming on TBS and TNT =

Historical summary of children's programming aired by TBS and TNT

Current TBS logo

Current TNT logo

TBS and TNT, the first two cable television networks in the Turner Broadcasting System, aired children's programming for a period of over 20 years, beginning in the 1970s and continuing through 1998.

== Background ==
In 1986, Ted Turner's cable-TV conglomerate acquired most of the pre-May 1986 MGM film and television library In 1988, its cable channel Turner Network Television was launched and had gained an audience with its film library. In 1991, it purchased animation studio Hanna-Barbera Productions and acquired its large library as well as most of the pre-1991 Ruby-Spears library.

== TBS ==
Early programming included syndicated series such as The Flintstones, The Little Rascals, Spider-Man, Ultraman and Speed Racer.

In the 1980s, WTBS focused heavily on movies, running two during the day, and all movies after 8 p.m. with the exception of sports events. Other times, WTBS continued to run mostly classic sitcoms, and vintage cartoons. In 1986, with Ted Turner's purchase of MGM, WTBS now had the rights to the entire MGM library as well (including certain acquisitions by MGM). This gave WTBS many theatrical cartoons like Tom and Jerry. WTBS began to run The Little Rascals, Tom & Jerry, Looney Tunes/Merrie Melodies cartoons released prior to 8/1/1948, theatrical Popeye cartoons, and Three Stooges shorts under the banner Tom & Jerry and Friends between an hour and 90 minutes in the mornings and for an hour in the afternoons from 1986 to the mid-1990s.

In 1992, The Jetsons debuted on TBS and TNT due to Turner acquiring Hanna-Barbera. Original animated programming such as 2 Stupid Dogs, and SWAT Kats: The Radical Squadron were added as well, as part of the Sunday Morning In Front Of The TV block.

In response to educational program mandates, TBS added a live-action educational program, Feed Your Mind in 1994. On February 20, 1995, TBS, TNT and Cartoon Network simulcasted the Space Ghost Coast to Coast episode "1st Annual World Premiere Toon-In", which included the first World Premiere Toons short "The Powerpuff Girls in Meat Fuzzy Lumkins". Cartoon Planet premiered on TBS in July as a response to Ted Turner enjoying watching the Space Ghost episode on TBS.

TBS' children's programs became part of the Disaster Area block in March 1996. The block's branding featured an offscreen reporter inside a talking tornado of junk. Turner was bought by Time Warner in 1996. Among the programming changes instituted after the merger was the addition of later Looney Tunes/Merrie Melodies cartoons, released no earlier than August 1, 1948 (as previously mentioned); the change was promoted with the title of Super Looney Tunes on June 23, 1997. Also added were reruns of the WB Animation series Taz-Mania, which had recently ceased airing on Fox Kids.

Children's programs broadcast by TBS

- 2 Stupid Dogs/Super Secret Squirrel (1993–95)
- The Alvin Show (1985–86)
- The Archies (1976–78)
- The Banana Splits and Friends Show (1971–74; 1979)
- The Baseball Bunch (1980–85)
- Battle of the Planets (1984–85)
- Captain Planet and the Planeteers (1990–97)
- Cartoon Carnival (1970–75)
- Cartoon Planet (1995–96)
- Challenge of the Superfriends
- Dexter's Laboratory (1996–97)
- Discovery (1978–79)
- Dusty's Treehouse (1976–77)
- Feed Your Mind (1994–98)
- The Flintstones (1969–98)
- G-Force: Guardians of Space (1987)
- Garfield and Friends (1995–97)
- Gigglesnort Hotel (1979–80)
- Heckle and Jeckle (1983–85)
- Infinity Factory (1981–82)
- The Jetsons (1992–98)
- Jonny Quest: The Real Adventures (1996–97)
- Kid's Beat (short series; 1983–96)
- The King and Odie (1969–70)
- The Little Rascals (1969–86)
- Looney Tunes (1980–98)
- The Mickey Mouse Club (1977–79)
- The New Howdy Doody Show (1976–77)
- Popeye the Sailor (1971–74; 1980–95)
- Rebop (1979–81)
- Romper Room (1972–84)
- Scooby-Doo (1986–89, 1994–98)
- The Space Giants (1978–81)
- Space Ghost Coast to Coast/What a Cartoon! (February 20, 1995)
- Speed Racer (1971–79)
- Spectreman (1978–80)
- Spider-Man (1970–75)
- Superstation Funtime (1980–86)
  - Encyclopædia Britannica Films
- SWAT Kats: The Radical Squadron (1993–95)
- Taz-Mania (1996–97)
- The Three Stooges (1979–95)
- Tom and Jerry and Friends/Tom and Jerry's Funhouse on TBS (1986–95)
- Tom & Jerry Kids (1994–95)
- Ton of Fun/Mini Disaster Area (short series; 1991–97)
  - Tom and Jerry
- Ultraman (1971–80)
- Vegetable Soup (1979–83)
- Yo, Yogi! (1992–93)
- Yogi and Friends (1993–94)

== TNT ==
Prior to the launch of TNT, it entered an agreement with The Jim Henson Company to air The Muppet Show (which Henson had just acquired from ITC Entertainment) and Fraggle Rock for four years. Both shows aired alongside cartoon shorts in a daily block called TNT Wild World of Shorts! The Muppets also appeared the following year in two PSAs for The Better World Society, founded by Ted Turner.

In 1992, TNT Wild World of Shorts! was rebranded as TNT Toons; Captain Planet and the Planeteers, The Jetsons, and other Hanna-Barbera shows joined the block. Later additions to TNT Toons included The Flintstones, Scooby-Doo, Dexter's Laboratory and The Real Adventures of Jonny Quest. The Rudy and Gogo World Famous Cartoon Show was a TNT original show featuring classic Warner Bros., MGM, and Popeye shorts, hosted by marionettes and a nanny goat. TNT also aired episodes of Garfield and Friends on a separate syndication contract.

Children's programs broadcast by TNT

- Adventure Quest (1993–94)
- Blast Off! (short series; 1988–90)
- Captain Planet and the Planeteers (1992–93)
- Clap (short series; 1990–91)
- Colossal Cartoon Club (1993–94)
- Dexter's Laboratory (1996–97)
- The Flintstones (1995–98)
- Fraggle Rock (1988–92)
- Fun Zone (1988–91)
- Garfield and Friends (1995–97)
- Huckleberry Hound (1994)
- The Jetsons (1992–95)
- Jonny Quest (1992–95)
- Jonny Quest: The Real Adventures (1996–98)
- Bugs Bunny and Pals/Bugs Bunny's All-Stars/Bugs Bunny, Bugs Bunny, Rah! Rah! Rah! (1988–98)
- The Muppet Show (1988–92)
- Our Gang (1992–2001)
- The Pink Panther (1991–96)
  - Crazy Claws
- Popeye the Sailor (1988–92)
- Really Big Toon Show (1992–93)
  - Huckleberry Hound
  - Pixie and Dixie
  - Punkin' Puss & Mushmouse
  - Quick Draw McGraw
- The Rudy and Gogo World Famous Cartoon Show (1995–97)
- Scooby Dooby Doo! (1994–98)
- Space Ghost Coast to Coast/What a Cartoon! (February 20, 1995)
- Snorks (1992)
- Taz-Mania (1996–98)
- Tom and Jerry (1995)
- Ultra Seven (1994–2001)
- The Woody Woodpecker Show (1991–92)
- Yogi Bear Bunch (1993–95)

== Demise ==
The eventual discontinuation of TNT and TBS cartoon programming was planned in mid-1992 with the debut of Cartoon Network. The first challenge for Cartoon Network was to overcome its low penetration of existing cable systems. When launched in October 1992, the channel was only carried by 233 cable systems; however, the channel benefited from package deals. New subscribers to sister stations TNT and WTBS could also get access to Cartoon Network through the relatively new practice of retransmission consent, which allows cable stations to dictate the terms of carriage on cable systems. TBS and TNT, two of the most popular cable networks of the time, arranged for deals that encouraged cable outlets to carry Cartoon Network, a move that gave the network a greater amount of leverage over competitors such as Nickelodeon. The high ratings of Cartoon Network over the following couple of years led to more cable systems including it. By the end of 1996, Cartoon Network had become "the fifth most popular cable channel in the United States".

For the first several years of Cartoon Network's existence, TBS and TNT carried some of Cartoon Network's original programs as part of their lineups to cross-promote the new channel. Due to restrictions on children's advertising and educational programming mandates (an issue for WTBS, which was still a terrestrial station at the time, but not for TNT), as well as the greater establishment of Cartoon Network's distribution and the industry-wide move of better cartoons to cable, WTBS and TNT both dropped all their cartoons in the fall of 1998 and moved those exclusively to Cartoon Network. By the early 2000s, most of these cartoons were once again moved to Boomerang, a commercial-free digital cable channel, although a handful of TBS and TNT-era programs remain on Cartoon Network. TBS and TNT have both since specialized their programming: TNT to drama, and TBS to situation comedy; their carrying of other programs outside those genera is mostly limited to sporting events.
