= List of programs broadcast by TBS =

This is a list of television programs formerly and currently broadcast by the cable television channel TBS in the United States.

== Current programming ==
=== Original programming ===
==== Unscripted ====
===== Reality =====
Title	Genre	Premiere	Seasons	Length	Status
Impractical Jokers (seasons 10–13) (Note: Seasons 1–9 originally aired on TruTV.)	Hidden camera show	February 9, 2023	4 seasons, 64 episodes	24 min	Pending
Foul Play with Anthony Davis	Hidden camera show	April 6, 2026	2 seasons, 9 episodes	24 min	Season 2 ongoing

==== Movie presentations ====
- Dinner and a Movie (1995–2011; 2024)
- Friday Night Vibes (2021–22; 2024)

==== Sports programming ====
- Major League Baseball on TBS (2008)
- NCAA Division I Men's Basketball Tournament (2011)
- ELeague (2016)
- NHL on TNT (2022; Stanley Cup playoffs games and simulcasts)

==== Professional wrestling ====
- AEW Dynamite (2022; moved from TNT)
- AEW Collision (2024; overflow coverage)

=== Acquired programming ===
- Family Matters (1995–2003; 2020)
- Friends (2001)
- The Office (2007–15; 2026)
- American Dad! (2010) (Note: Seasons 1-11 originally aired on Fox; seasons 12-21 originally aired on TBS as an original series before moving back to Fox)
- The Big Bang Theory (2011)
- Young Sheldon (2021)

== Former programming ==
=== Original programming ===
==== Comedy ====
- Tush (1980–81)
- Down to Earth (1984–87)
- Rocky Road (1984–87)
- Safe at Home (1985–89)
- The New Leave It to Beaver (1986–89)
- The Chimp Channel (1999)
- 10 Items or Less (2006–09)
- My Boys (2006–10)
- Tyler Perry's House of Payne (2006–12; moved to BET)
- The Bill Engvall Show (2007–09)
- Meet the Browns (2009–11)
- Are We There Yet? (2010–13)
- Glory Daze (2010–11)
- For Better or Worse (2011–12; moved to OWN)
- Men at Work (2012–14)
- Sullivan & Son (2012–14)
- Wedding Band (2012–13)
- Cougar Town (2013–15; moved from ABC)
- Ground Floor (2013–15)
- Clipped (2015)
- Meet the Smiths (2015)
- Your Family or Mine (2015)
- Angie Tribeca (2016–18)
- People of Earth (2016–17)
- Search Party (2016–17; moved to HBO Max)
- The Detour (2016–19)
- Wrecked (2016–18)
- The Guest Book (2017–18)
- The Last O.G. (2018–21)
- Miracle Workers (2019–23)
- Chad (2021; moved to The Roku Channel)

==== Drama ====
- The Catlins (1983–85)

==== Animation ====
- Neighbors from Hell (2010)
- American Dad! (2014–25; originally on Fox and moved back to Fox)
- Tarantula (2017)
- Final Space (2018; moved to Adult Swim)
- Close Enough (2021–22; simulcast with HBO Max)

==== Unscripted ====
===== Game show =====
- Starcade (1982–84)
- Trust Me, I'm a Game Show Host (2013)
- Who Gets the Last Laugh? (2013)
- Wipeout (2008) (2013–14)
- Bam's Bad Ass Game Show (2014)
- Separation Anxiety (2016)
- The Joker's Wild (2017–19)
- The Misery Index (2019–21)
- The Cube (2021–23)
- Wipeout (2021–25)

===== Late night =====
- Lopez Tonight (2009–11)
- Conan (2010–21)
- The Pete Holmes Show (2013–14)
- Full Frontal with Samantha Bee (2016–22)

===== Reality =====
- Court TV: Inside America's Courts (1995–96)
- Ripley's Believe It or Not! (2000–03)
- Worst Case Scenarios (2002)
- House Rules (2003)
- He's a Lady (2004)
- The Mansion (2004)
- The Real Gilligan's Island (2004–05)
- Daisy Does America (2005–06)
- Minding the Store (2005)
- Frank TV (2007–08)
- Deal With It (2013–14)
- Deon Cole's Black Box (2013)
- King of the Nerds (2013–15)
- CeeLo Green's The Good Life (2014)
- Funniest Wins (2014)
- Funny or Die Presents: America's Next Weatherman (2015)
- America's Greatest Makers (2016)
- Drop the Mic (2017–18)
- The Sims Spark'd (2020)
- Tournament of Laughs (2020)
- Lost Resort (2020)
- Celebrity Show-Off (2020)
- Go-Big Show (2021–22)
- Harry Potter: Hogwarts Tournament of Houses (2021)
- Rat in the Kitchen (2022)
- The Big D (2022)
- Power Slap: Road to the Title (2023)
- AEW All Access (2023)
- I Survived Bear Grylls (2023)
- The Joe Schmo Show (season 4) (2025) (Note: Seasons 1–3 originally aired on Spike.)

===== News =====
- 17 Update Early in the Morning (1976–79)
- TBS Evening News (1980–84)
- Good News (1983–91)
- Between the Lines (1991–94)
- Real News for Kids (1992–94)
- Feed Your Mind (1994–98)

===== Variety =====
- Nice People (1981–83)
- Night Tracks (1983–92)
- Portrait of America (1983–88)
- National Geographic Explorer (1986–99)
- Portrait of the Soviet Union (1988)
- Live from the House of Blues (1995–96)
- Wild! Life Adventures (1997–2000)
- The Megan Mullally Show (2006–07)
- Stupid Pet Tricks (2024)

==== Children's programming ====
- Superstation Funtime (1980–86)
- Kid's Beat (1983–96)
- Captain Planet and the Planeteers (1990–97)
- 2 Stupid Dogs/Super Secret Squirrel (1993–95)
- SWAT Kats: The Radical Squadron (1993–95)
- Cartoon Planet (1995–96)
- The Real Adventures of Jonny Quest (1996–97)

==== Public affairs programming (only shown on WTBS 17) ====
- Interact Atlanta (1999–2002)
- XCU (2003–04)
- TBS STORYline (2004–07)

==== Sports programming ====
- Braves TBS Baseball (1973–2007)
- College Football on TBS (1982–2006)
- NASCAR on TBS (1983–2000)
- NBA on TBS (1984–2002)
- NBA on TNT (2015–2025; NBA All-Star Game simulcasts and alternate broadcasts & 2023–2025; regular season simulcasts)
- U.S. Olympic Gold (1989–92)
- NCAA Beach Volleyball Championship (2016–17)

==== Professional wrestling ====
- Championship Wrestling from Georgia (1971–82)
- Best of World Championship Wrestling (1973–87)
- WCW Saturday Night (1982–2000)
- WWF on TBS (1984–85)
- Mid-South Wrestling (1985)
- WCW Pro (1985–98)
- WCW Main Event (1988–98)
- WCW Clash of the Champions (1988–97)
- NWA/WCW Power Hour (1989–94)
- WCW All Nighter (1994–95)
- WCW Thunder (1998–2001)
- AEW Rampage (2024; overflow coverage)

=== Syndicated repeats ===
==== Live-action ====
- 2 Broke Girls (2015–23)
- 9 to 5 (1988–89)
- 12 Dates of Christmas (2021)
- According to Jim (2009–13)
- The Addams Family (1976–92)
- The Adventures of Ozzie and Harriet (1981–82)
- Alice (1987–89)
- All in the Family (1979–93)
- Amen (1997–2002)
- America's Funniest Home Videos (1995–97; 2014–17)
- America's Funniest People (1998–2003)
- American Caesar (1985)
- The Andy Griffith Show (1976–99)
- The Baseball Bunch (1980–85)
- BattleBots (2022)
- Battle of the Planets (1984)
- Becker (2005–06)
- The Beverly Hillbillies (1976–99)
- Bewitched (1982–97)
- Big Trick Energy (2021)
- Billy on the Street (2016–17)
- The Bob Newhart Show (1979–87; 1991)
- Bonanza (1987–95)
- Bosom Buddies (2002–06)
- The Brady Bunch (1980–97)
- Brooklyn Nine-Nine (2018–21)
- California Dreams (1996−98)
- Carol Burnett & Friends (1978–89)
- Charles in Charge (1994–98)
- Childrens Hospital (2014)
- CHiPs (1988–2004)
- Cimarron Strip (1985–87)
- Claws (2019)
- Coach (1997–2002)
- Cosby (2000–05)
- The Cosby Show (1999–2008)
- Dawson's Creek (2003–08)
- A Different World (1999–2002)
- Discovery (1978–79)
- Dragnet (1978–80)
- The Drew Carey Show (2002–07)
- Ed (2004–05)
- Empty Nest (1996)
- Everybody Loves Raymond (2004–21)
- Family Affair (1976–77, 1980–81)
- Family Ties (1996–2001)
- Father Knows Best (1976–86; 1988)
- Fishin' with Orlando Wilson (1984–92)
- Fishing with Roland Martin (1985–92)
- The Flight Attendant (2020; 2022)
- The Fresh Prince of Bel-Air (1999–2004; 2007–14)
- Full House (1998–2002, 2013–16)
- George Lopez (2020–23)
- Get Smart (1976–77, 1984–90)
- Gigglesnort Hotel (1979–80)
- Gilligan's Island (1976–81; 1986–87; 1989–2002)
- Gomer Pyle, U.S.M.C. (1976–99)
- Good Times (1989–92; 2000–02)
- Green Acres (1978–83; 1985–89)
- Growing Pains (1993–96)
- Gunsmoke (1986–92)
- Happy Days (1990–95)
- Hazel (1976–86)
- Head of the Class (1993; 1996)
- Headline News (1983–98)
- Heckle and Jeckle (1983–85)
- The High Chaparral (1983–87)
- Hogan's Heroes (1976–92)
- Home Improvement (2002–13)
- The Honeymooners (1986–93)
- Hunter (1998–2002)
- I Dream of Jeannie (1978–87; 1991–93)
- I Love Lucy (1976–81; 1983–87; 1990–93)
- Impractical Jokers (2019–22)
- It Is Written (1980–96)
- The Jeff Foxworthy Show (2012–14)
- The Jeffersons (1989-96)
- Just Shoot Me! (2007–10)
- The King of Queens (2006–19)
- Lassie (1976–78)
- Laverne & Shirley (1987–98)
- Leave It to Beaver (1976–97)
- Little House on the Prairie (1983–2003)
- The Little Rascals (1976–80)
- Lois & Clark: The New Adventures of Superman (2003)
- Lost in Space (1976–83)
- Love, American Style (1976–81)
- Love Life (2021–22)
- The Lucy Show (1976–80; 1984–88)
- Mama's Family (1997–2006)
- Married... with Children (2008–18)
- The Mary Tyler Moore Show (1985–87; 1991–92)
- Matlock (1993–2003)
- Maude (1992)
- Maverick (1978–81)
- The Mickey Mouse Club (1977–79)
- Mission Impossible (1976–77, 1982–83)
- Modern Family (2023–26)
- The Monkees (1976–78)
- Mr. Show with Bob and David (2004–07)
- The Munsters (1976–95)
- My Name Is Earl (2008–14)
- My Three Sons (1977–83; 1990–91)
- New Girl (2015–22)
- The New Howdy Doody Show (1976–77)
- NewsRadio (2006–07)
- Night Gallery (1980–81)
- One Day at a Time (1988–92)
- The Parent 'Hood (2002–07)
- The Partridge Family (1976–82; 1984)
- Perry Mason (1976–99)
- The Rat Patrol (1979–85)
- Rebop (1980–81)
- The Rifleman (1986–95)
- Romper Room (1976–84)
- Roseanne (1998–2003)
- Rules of Engagement (2013–15)
- Sanford and Son (1978–93)
- Saved by the Bell (1992–2012)
- Saved by the Bell: The College Years (1994–2012)
- Seinfeld (2002–21)
- Sex and the City (2004–10)
- Silicon Valley (2023)
- Spectreman (1978–80)
- Star Trek (1976–79)
- Tacoma FD (2019–20)
- The Steve Harvey Show (2003–11)
- Texas (early 1980s)
- That Girl (1982–83)
- The Three Stooges (1976–95)
- Three's Company (1992–99)
- Too Close for Comfort (1991)
- Ultraman (1976–80)
- The Untouchables (1980–81)
- Vegetable Soup (1979–83)
- Wagon Train (1986–95)
- Who's the Boss? (1994–97)
- World at Large (1976–87) (Note: An umbrella name for factual short films produced by third-parties.)
- World of Audubon (1984–96)
- World's Funniest Videos (1999–2003)
- The World Tomorrow (1983–94)
- Yes, Dear (2004–12)

==== Animation ====
- The Alvin Show (1985–86; 1987)
- The Archie Show (1976–78)
- Baby Blues (2004–05)
- The Banana Splits and Friends Show (1979)
- Bob's Burgers (2016–23)
- The Cleveland Show (2013–18)
- Dexter's Laboratory (1996–97)
- The Flintstones (1976–98)
- Futurama (2003–07)
- Family Guy (2003–21)
- Garfield and Friends (1995–97)
- Harley Quinn (2019)
- The Jetsons (1992–98)
- Looney Tunes (1980–98)
- Mission Hill (2004–08)
- The Oblongs (2004–06; 2013–15)
- Popeye (1980–95)
- Rick and Morty (2015; 2021)
- Robot Chicken (2014)
- Royal Crackers (2023)
- Scooby-Doo (1986–98)
- Space Ghost Coast to Coast/What a Cartoon! (February 20, 1995)
- The Space Giants (1978–81)
- Speed Racer (1976–78)
- Taz-Mania (1996–97)
- Tom and Jerry (1986–97)
- Tom & Jerry Kids (1994–95)
- Tuca & Bertie (2021)
- Yo Yogi! (1992–93)
- Yogi and Friends (1993–94)

== See also ==
- List of programs broadcast by CNN
- List of programs broadcast by TNT
- List of programs broadcast by TruTV
- List of programs broadcast by ID
