= List of programs broadcast by TNT (American TV network) =

This is a list of programs broadcast by Skydance Corporation's TNT network.

== Current programming ==
=== Original programming ===
==== Drama ====
Title	Genre	Premiere	Seasons	Length	Status
The Librarians: The Next Chapter	Fantasy adventure	May 25, 2025	2 seasons, 24 episodes	42–50 min	Pending

==== Unscripted ====
===== Reality =====
Title	Genre	Premiere	Seasons	Length	Status
Dunkman	Sports reality competition	December 4, 2025	2 seasons, 11 episodes	46–62 min	Renewed

==== Sports programming ====
TNT holds the broadcast rights to the following sports telecasts:

- College Football on TNT Sports (Since 2024)
- Golf on TNT Sports (Since 1999)
- Major League Baseball on TBS (Since 2007; overflow coverage)
- College Basketball on TNT Sports (Since 2011)
  - NCAA Men's Division I Basketball Tournament (preliminary rounds and Final Four simulcasts)
- Soccer on TNT Sports (Since 2023)
- Tennis on TNT Sports (2000–2002; since 2025)
- NASCAR on TNT (2001–2014; since 2025) (co-production with NBC Sports from 2001 to 2006. Production shifted to Turner Sports full time from 2007 to 2014 since 2025)
- NHL on TNT (Since 2021)

==== Professional wrestling ====
- AEW Collision (2023)
- AEW Saturday Tailgate Brawl (2025)

=== Acquired programming ===
==== Drama ====
- Charmed (2001)
- Cold Case (2005) (Note: TNT's syndication rights to Cold Case first expired in 2011, but they reacquired the rights in 2022.)
- FBI (2025)
- The Pitt (2025)

==== Docuseries ====
- Hollywood Demons (2025)

==== Reality ====
- Impractical Jokers (2026)
- Gold Rush (2026)
- Flavortown Food Fight (2026)
- Foul Play with Anthony Davis (2026)

== Former programming ==
=== Original programming ===
==== Drama ====
- Babylon 5 (1998; and four made-for-TV movies)
- Crusade (1999)
- Bull (2000–2001)
- Witchblade (2001–2002)
- The Mists of Avalon (2001)
- The Grid (2003–2004)
- Salem's Lot (2004)
- Into the West (2005)
- The Closer (2005–2012)
- Wanted (2005)
- Nightmares & Dreamscapes: From the Stories of Stephen King (2006)
- Saved (2006)
- Saving Grace (2007–2010)
- Heartland (2007)
- The Company (2007)
- Leverage (2008–2012)
- Raising the Bar (2008–2009)
- Dark Blue (2009–2010)
- HawthoRNe (2009–2011)
- Men of a Certain Age (2009–2011)
- Trust Me (2009)
- Memphis Beat (2010–2011)
- Rizzoli & Isles (2010–2016)
- Southland (2010–2013; moved from NBC)
- Falling Skies (2011–2015)
- Franklin & Bash (2011–2014)
- Dallas (2012–2014)
- Major Crimes (2012–2018)
- Perception (2012–2015)
- King & Maxwell (2013)
- Mob City (2013)
- Monday Mornings (2013)
- The Last Ship (2014–2018)
- Legends (2014–2015)
- The Librarians (2014–2018)
- Murder in the First (2014–2016)
- Agent X (2015)
- Proof (2015)
- Public Morals (2015)
- Animal Kingdom (2016–2022)
- Good Behavior (2016–2017)
- Will (2017)
- Claws (2017–2022)
- The Alienist (2018–2020)
- I Am the Night (2019)
- Snowpiercer (2020–2022; moved to AMC)
- High Value Target: The Hunt for Saddam (2026)

==== Reality ====
- Wedding Day (2009)
- The Great Escape (2012)
- The Hero (2013)
- 72 Hours (2013)
- Boston's Finest (2013)
- Cold Justice (2013–2015; moved to Oxygen)
- Marshal Law: Texas (2013)
- APB with Troy Dunn (2014)
- Inside Job (2014)
- On the Menu (2014)
- Private Lives of Nashville Wives (2014)
- Save Our Business (2014)
- Wake Up Call (2014–2015)
- Cold Justice: Sex Crimes (2015)
- Drop the Mic (2019; moved from TBS)
- The Joker's Wild (2019; moved from TBS)
- Shaq Life (2020–2021)
- Rhodes to the Top (2021)
- TNT Overdrive (2024)
- Dunkman (2025)

==== Sports programming ====
- NBA on TNT (1989–2025)
- NFL on TNT (1990–1997)
- Olympics on TNT (1992–1998)
- Golf on TNT (1995–2019)
- Title Night (1998–2000)
- UEFA Champions League (2018–2020)
- Wimbledon (2000–2002)

==== Professional wrestling ====
- WCW Monday Nitro (1995–2001)
- AEW Dynamite (2019–2021; moved to TBS)
- AEW Rampage (2021–2024)
- AEW Battle of the Belts (2022–2024)

==== Docuseries ====
- Chasing the Cure (2019)
- Rich & Shameless (2022)

==== Movie presentations ====
- MonsterVision (1991–2000)
- Saturday Nitro (1995–1997)
- Friday Nitro (1997–2000)
- The New Classics (1996–2000)
- Saturday Night New Classics (2000–08)

=== Acquired programming ===
==== Scripted ====
- How the West Was Won (1988–1999)
- The Man from U.N.C.L.E. (1988–2000)
- Medical Center (1988–1990)
- The Muppet Show (1988–1992)
- National Velvet (1988–1991)
- Then Came Bronson (1988–1992)
- The Travels of Jaimie McPheeters (1988–1991)
- My Favorite Martian (1989–1990; 1992–1995)
- The Courtship of Eddie's Father (1989–1992)
- The Girl from U.N.C.L.E. (1989–1995; 1998)
- Hondo (1989–1999)
- Gilligan's Island (1990–1992; 1994–2000)
- Logan's Run (1990–1993)
- Dallas (1991–1992)
- Jericho (1991–1993)
- Knots Landing (1991–1992; 1994–1997)
- Northwest Passage (1991–1993)
- CHiPs (1992–2002)
- Mayberry R.F.D. (1992)
- Charlie's Angels (1993–1999)
- A Man Called Shenandoah (1993–1996)
- The Thin Man (1993–1994)
- Chicago Story (1994–1995)
- Gavilan (1994–1995)
- Kung Fu (1994–2001)
- The Wild Wild West (1994–2001)
- Space Ghost Coast to Coast (February 20, 1995)
- In the Heat of the Night (1995–2006)
- Starsky & Hutch (1995–1999)
- Thunder in Paradise (1995–1997, 2000–2001)
- The Adventures of Brisco County, Jr. (1996–2002)
- Lois & Clark: The New Adventures of Superman (1997–2003)
- Kung Fu: The Legend Continues (1997–2002)
- Lonesome Dove (1997–1998)
- The Outer Limits (1997)
- Spenser: For Hire (1997–1998)
- Due South (1998–2001)
- ER (1998–2010)
- The Client (1998–1999)
- The New Twilight Zone (1998–2002)
- Reasonable Doubts (1998–1999)
- Dark Justice (2000)
- Pensacola: Wings of Gold (2000–2004)
- Psi Factor (2000–2002)
- The Pretender (2000–2005)
- Tour of Duty (2000–2001)
- Law & Order (2001–2019)
- The Lost World (2001–2006)
- NYPD Blue (2001–2008)
- The X-Files (2002–2009)
- Angel (2003–2013)
- Judging Amy (2003–2007)
- Alias (2005–2008)
- Las Vegas (2005–2013)
- Without a Trace (2005–2009)
- Bones (2008–2022)
- Numb3rs (2009–2014)
- CSI: NY (2009–2019)
- Supernatural (2010–2025)
- The Mentalist (2011–2014)
- Smallville (2011–2015)
- Castle (2012–2021)
- Hawaii Five-0 (2013–2019)
- Grimm (2015–2019)
- Arrow (2016–2021)
- NCIS: New Orleans (2017–2025)
- The West Wing (2020)
- Titans (2021–2022)
- Million Dollar Wheels (2022)
- Lucifer (2022–2024)
- Harley Quinn (2022)
- Game Theory with Bomani Jones (2023)
- True Blood (2023)
- Royal Crackers (2023–2024; sporadic)
- The Lazarus Project (2023–2024)
- True Detective: Night Country (2025)
- Peacemaker (2025)

==== Children's programming ====
Most of these programs have since moved to sister channels Cartoon Network or Boomerang, or aired simultaneously on the former during their TNT slots.

- Daktari (1988–1992)
- Fraggle Rock (1988–1992)
- Fun Zone (1988–1991)
- Looney Tunes (1988–1998)
- Popeye the Sailor (1988–1992)
- The Pink Panther (1991–1996)
- Woody Woodpecker (1991–1992)
- Our Gang (1991–2001)
- Captain Planet and the Planeteers (1992–1993)
- The Jetsons (1992–1995)
- Really Big Toon Show (1992–1993)
- Snorks (1992)
- Adventure Quest (1993–1994)
- Colossal Cartoon Club (1993–1994)
- Yogi Bear Bunch (1993–1995)
- Jonny Quest (1994)
- Huckleberry Hound (1994)
- Scooby Dooby Doo! (1994–1998)
- Ultra Seven (1994–1995; 1997–2000)
- Garfield and Friends (1995–1997)
- Tom and Jerry (1995)
- The Flintstones (1995–1998)
- What a Cartoon! (1995–1996; sporadic)
- Dexter's Laboratory (1996–1997)
- Jonny Quest: The Real Adventures (1996–1998)
- Taz-Mania (1996–1998)
- Star Wars: The Clone Wars (2009)

==== Docuseries ====
- Portrait of America (1988–1990)

==== Reality ====
- World's Most Dramatic Police Chases (2004–2008)

== See also ==
- List of programs broadcast by TBS
- List of programs broadcast by Cartoon Network
- List of programs broadcast by Adult Swim
- List of programs broadcast by Boomerang
- List of programs broadcast by Discovery Channel
