= Barry Mills (producer) =

American filmmaker

Barry Mills is an American film producer, director, writer, and voice actor. Mills grew up in Pine Mountain, Georgia.

== Early work ==
Barry Mills started his career by writing and producing promos and bumpers for TBS and TNT in the early 1990s. As a hobby, he videotaped live bands such as the Mekons, Butthole Surfers, and Sonic Youth. Mills also started Atlanta's first underground hip-hop radio show "Macadocious In Effect" on WRFG, which featured a host of guest DJs including the debut of Lil Jon.

== Rudy and GoGo ==
In 1995 Barry and his friend, author Jack Pendarvis, created the TV show The Rudy and Gogo World Famous Cartoon Show for TBS, but ended up getting picked up by TNT and premiered in July of '95. The Rudy and Gogo World Famous Cartoon Show was an afternoon block of classic cartoon shorts hosted by marionettes ("Rowdy" Rudy was voiced by Mills) and a mostly silent nanny goat named Gogo, taking place in front of an ever-changing green screen. TNT would use Rudy and Gogo for various cartoon and movie specials as well, until the show got cancelled in 1997.

== Cartoon Network and Adult Swim ==
In 1998 Mills started working for Cartoon Network and was a producer for the fifth season of Space Ghost Coast to Coast, a show which featured his father Palmer Mills as a guest in the second season. Later he wrote and produced the cartoon anthology shows The Bob Clampett Show and The Popeye Show, in which he restored most of the theatrical shorts to their original, unedited forms.

Also in the early 2000s he did some voice-over work for Aqua Teen Hunger Force and Sealab 2021 and it was Mills who suggested rapper Schoolly D for the theme music for Aqua Teen Hunger Force. Mills' and Aqua Teen co-creator Matt Maiellaro's band, Donnell Hubbard also had their music featured in a few episodes of Sealab 2021.

== Sheila Green Productions ==
In 2003 he started up Sheila Green Productions, which has produced music videos for the independent label Bloodshot Records, television promos for various networks, and has released a limited edition DVD of the Hampton Grease Band's 2006 reunion concert. Sheila Green Productions also handled the multimedia aspects of Jon Langford's "Executioner's Last Songs" tour.

Mills directed, produced, and co-wrote the 2012 independent film Fun World, a dark comedy set in the future about the US Government being able to spy on the public through a new type of television set.
