= Rebop =

Rebop may be:

- An early name for bebop, a form of jazz music, still used in the UK in the 1970s
- Rebop Kwaku Baah, Ghanaian percussionist with Traffic
- Rebop (TV series), an American television show produced by WGBH Boston from 1976 to 1979
- The Re-Bops, a kids' band
