= The Popeye Show =

American animation anthology series

- Voices of: Bill Murray
- Country of origin: United States
- No. of episodes: 45 (135 segments)

Production
- Executive producers: Mike Lazzo; Keith Crofford
- Producer: Barry Mills
- Running time: 30 minutes
- Production company: Cartoon Network Productions

Original release
- Network: Cartoon Network
- Release: November 12, 2001 – July 20, 2003

The Popeye Show (originally titled I'm Popeye) is an American animated anthology series that premiered on November 12, 2001, on Cartoon Network. Each episode includes three Popeye theatrical shorts from Fleischer Studios and/or Famous Studios. The show is narrated by voice actor Bill Murray (not to be confused with the actor of the same name), who gives the audience short facts about the history of the cartoons as filler material between each short. Animation historian Jerry Beck served as a consultant and Barry Mills served as writer and producer. A total of 45 episodes were produced, consisting of a total of 135 shorts. The series was originally planned to premiere on October 29, 2001 with "Episode 1" before being pulled at the last minute. "Episode 2" would instead act as the series premiere, airing on November 12, 2001, while "Episode 1" would premiere on November 19, 2001.

== Significance ==
Prior to the premiere of The Popeye Show, most television airings of theatrical Popeye cartoons bore the logos of Associated Artists Productions, the company that bought the films from Paramount Pictures for television distribution. This is due to the films having been sold in the 1950s, when most movie studios did not want to be associated with television. As a result, A.A.P. was required to replace the original Paramount logos with their own. For The Popeye Show, efforts were made to present these films as close to their original theatrical form as possible: some of the cartoons shown were copies that actually had their original Paramount titles intact, while others needed to have their original titles simulated through the process of digital video editing.

The show focused mostly on the Fleischer Popeye shorts and early Famous Studios shorts that were originally filmed in black and white. For all episodes, the first two shorts were from this era. Sometimes the third cartoon would be a color cartoon from Famous Studios, but on many occasions an entire episode would entirely be made of black-and-white cartoons. While selecting the color entries that would air, the only ones that were initially selected were those that were in the Turner vaults with their original titles. The only color cartoons to have their original titles recreated were those shown in the last episode of Season 3, and all episodes of Season 4.

In season 1, an original copy of Popeye, the Ace of Space (1953) with its original titles was shown for the first time on TV. This particular cartoon was originally shown in 3D, and therefore had a unique opening sequence. It also had a unique ending sequence that was not shown on syndication prints because it involved the Paramount logo being formed from the smoke of Popeye's pipe. The black and white short The Hungry Goat (1943) was kept from being shown in earlier seasons because it required extra attention to recreate the ending as close to original as possible. The original ending involved Popeye's nemesis in the short, a goat, laughing at Popeye while watching the end of the very cartoon they were in, and, like The Ace of Space, involved the Paramount logo.

The 1945 short Tops in the Big Top, which did not open with the standard Popeye theme music, but had a rendition with a circus theme, had its original soundtrack restored for the program. Similarly, a version of We're on Our Way to Rio (1944) was prepared with the opening soundtrack restored, but the show was cancelled before it could be included in any episodes.

== Cartoons skipped during original run ==
Two episodes from Season 1 were initially skipped and did not make their TV debut until reruns. The reason was that the two episodes had cartoons that the executives at Cartoon Network would not pass for unedited airings. Episode #10 was originally supposed to have Popeye the Sailor, which was a Betty Boop cartoon in which Popeye makes his theatrical debut. This particular cartoon had a scene at the carnival where Popeye and Bluto play a ball-toss game where the target is an African American stereotype. Episode #11 had the short Happy Birthdaze, in which Popeye murders his suicidal Navy buddy Shorty in a scene that is usually cut from most TV broadcasts. When Episode #10 finally aired, I Eats My Spinach replaced Popeye the Sailor, while Episode #11 aired with no changes made, and Happy Birthdaze was shown uncut.

=== Ethnic censorship ===
Several shorts are not seen in or out of this package due to heavy racial stereotyping, despite this anthological series being aired as part of Adult Swim in later runs. Pop-Pie a la Mode, The Island Fling, and Popeye's Pappy have since been removed from circulation because of African-American stereotyping. You're a Sap, Mr. Jap, Scrap the Japs, and Seein' Red, White, 'N' Blue are no longer shown on U.S. television due to Japanese stereotyping.

A later episode featured an unedited version of the World War II themed Spinach Fer Britain (1943), a cartoon in which Popeye battles Nazis. This particular cartoon was rarely shown outside of any scheduled airings of The Popeye Show. Another later episode featured stereotypes of Native-Americans in Wigwam Whoopee (1948), which featured Olive Oyl portrayed as an Indian princess with depicted skin color and other inappropriate themes. This episode is also rarely shown outside of any schedule airings of this anthology series. Wigwam Whoopee was available uncut on the Boomerang app until it was eventually removed in September 2021.

== Episodes ==
Below is an episode guide for The Popeye Show. All episodes are listed in production order. There were a few occasions where episodes were skipped and therefore did not air in their proper order.

== Series overview ==
Season	Episodes	Originally released	
Season	Episodes	First released	Last released
1	13	November 12, 2001	February 18, 2002
2	13	July 7, 2002	September 29, 2002
3	13	November 17, 2002	December 31, 2002
4	6	June 15, 2003	July 20, 2003

=== Season 1 (2001–2002) ===
Episode #	Shorts Featured	Original air date
1	Can You Take It? (1934); Me Musical Nephews (1942); Olive Oyl for President (1948)	November 19, 2001
2	Sock-a-Bye Baby (1934); The Jeep (1938); Fightin' Pals (1940)	November 12, 2001
3	The Spinach Overture (1935); It's The Natural Thing to Do (1939); Hill-billing and Cooing (1956)	November 26, 2001
4	Goonland (1938); Wotta Nitemare (1939); Pipeye, Pupeye, Poopeye an' Peepeye (1942)	December 3, 2001
5	Cops is Always Right (1938); Hello, How Am I? (1939); Robin Hood-Winked (1948)	December 3, 2001
6	Shiver Me Timbers (1934); Alona on the Sarong Seas (1942); Insect to Injury (1956)	December 10, 2001
7	The Man on the Flying Trapeze (1934); I Yam Love Sick (1938); She-Sick Sailors (1944)	December 10, 2001
8	A Dream Walking (1934); Organ Grinder's Swing (1937); Cops is Tops (1955)	December 17, 2001
9	The Hyp-Nut-Tist (1935); Child Psykolojiky (1941); Cartoons Ain't Human (1943)	December 17, 2001
10	I Eats My Spinach (1933); Little Swee'Pea (1936); Poopdeck Pappy (1940)	February 11, 2002
11	Vim, Vigor and Vitaliky (1936); Happy Birthdaze (1943); Abusement Park (1947)	February 18, 2002
12	Choose Your Weppins (1935); Mutiny Ain't Nice (1938); Kickin' the Conga Round (1942)	December 24, 2001
13	Never Kick a Woman (1936); Shakespearean Spinach (1940); Popeye, the Ace of Space (1953)	December 24, 2001

=== Season 2 (2002) ===
Episode #	Shorts Featured	Original air date
14	What - No Spinach? (1936); Lost and Foundry (1937); Popeye Presents Eugene the Jeep (1940)	July 7, 2002
15	Strong to the Finich (1934); Nurse Mates (1940); Quiet! Pleeze (1941)	July 14, 2002
16	Beware of Barnacle Bill (1935); Wimmin is a Myskery (1940); Olive's Boithday Presink (1941)	July 21, 2002
17	I Yam What I Yam (1933); The Football Toucher Downer (1937); I'll Never Crow Again (1941)	July 28, 2002
18	Hospitaliky (1937); Me Feelins is Hurt (1940); The Mighty Navy (1941)	August 5, 2002
19	Blow Me Down (1933); The Twisker Pitcher (1937); Nix on Hypnotricks (1941)	August 12, 2002
20	Hold the Wire (1936); Ghosks is the Bunk (1939); Olive Oyl and Water Don't Mix (1942)	August 19, 2002
21	Adventures of Popeye (1935); Stealin' Ain't Honest (1940); Many Tanks (1942)	August 26, 2002
22	Let's You and Him Fight (1934); Onion Pacific (1940); Baby Wants a Bottleship (1942)	September 1, 2002
23	Pleased to Meet Cha (1935); Let's Celebrake (1938); A Hull of a Mess (1942)	September 8, 2002
24	A Clean Shaven Man (1936); Protek the Weakerist (1937); Spinach fer Britain (1943)	September 15, 2002
25	Brotherly Love (1936); Popeye Meets William Tell (1940); Too Weak to Work (1943)	September 22, 2002
26	I Wanna Be a Lifeguard (1936); Puttin' on the Act (1940); Wood-Peckin' (1943)	September 29, 2002

=== Season 3 (2002) ===
Episode #	Shorts Featured	Original air date
27	We Aim to Please (1934); Learn Polikeness (1938); Shape Ahoy (1945)	November 17, 2002
28	King of the Mardi Gras (1935); Popeye Meets Rip Van Winkle (1941); A Haul in One (1956)	November 24, 2002
29	Axe Me Another (1934); Never Sock a Baby (1939); Peep in the Deep (1946)	December 1, 2002
30	Morning, Noon and Night Club (1937); Flies Ain't Human (1941); Parlez Vous Woo (1956)	December 8, 2002
31	Seasin's Greetinks (1933); Doing Impossikible Stunts (1940); Wigwam Whoopee (1948)	December 15, 2002
32	Dizzy Divers (1935); A Date to Skate (1938); Assault and Flattery (1956)	December 22, 2002
33	The Two-Alarm Fire (1934); Females is Fickle (1940); A Wolf in Sheik's Clothing (1948)	December 29, 2002
34	The Dance Contest (1934); Customers Wanted (1939); Out to Punch (1956)	December 19, 2002
35	For Better or Worser (1935); The House Builder Upper (1938); Symphony in Spinach (1948)	December 20, 2002
36	The Spinach Roadster (1936); Ration fer the Duration (1943); A Job for a Gob (1955)	December 24, 2002
37	Shoein' Hosses (1934); Plumbing is a Pipe (1938); Alpine for You (1951)	December 26, 2002
38	I Likes Babies and Infinks (1937); Pest Pilot (1941); Mister and Mistletoe (1955)	December 27, 2002
39	Fowl Play (1937); Fleets of Stren'th (1942); A Balmy Swami (1949)	December 31, 2002

=== Season 4 (2003) ===
Episode #	Shorts Featured	Original air date
40	I Never Changes My Altitude (1937); Wimmin Hadn't Oughta Drive (1940); The Marry-Go-Round (1943)	June 15, 2003
41	Wild Elephinks (1933); The Hungry Goat (1943); Tops in the Big Top (1945)	June 22, 2003
42	The Paneless Window Washer (1937); Big Chief Ugh-Amugh-Ugh (1938); Moving Aweigh (1944)	June 29, 2003
43	Bridge Ahoy (1936); Leave Well Enough Alone (1939); Pitchin' Woo at the Zoo (1944)	July 6, 2003
44	I-Ski Love-Ski You-Ski (1936); Bulldozing the Bull (1938); Spinach Packin' Popeye (1944)	July 13, 2003
45	You Gotta Be a Football Hero (1935); Olive's Sweepstake Ticket (1941); The Anvil Chorus Girl (1944)	July 20, 2003

== See also ==
- Popeye the Sailor filmography (Fleischer Studios)
- Popeye the Sailor filmography (Famous Studios)
- The Tex Avery Show
- ToonHeads
- The Bob Clampett Show
- Cartoon Alley
