= The Rudy and Gogo World Famous Cartoon Show =

American programming block

- Title card
- Created by: Barry Mills; Jack Pendarvis
- Voices of: Barry Mills; Gus Jordan; Jack Pendarvis; Bill Taft; Sally Timms; Jon Langford
- Country of origin: United States

Production
- Running time: 60 minutes

Original release
- Network: TNT
- Release: July 8, 1995 – August 20, 1997

The Rudy and GoGo World Famous Cartoon Show was a programming block of cartoons for TNT during the mid-1990s. Hosted by "Rowdy" Rudy R. Moore (a marionette puppet of a young boy, who looked a little like Howdy Doody), and his pet goat Gogo (a live action nanny goat), the show featured a variety of cartoon short subjects from Turner Entertainment's library, including pre-August 1948 Warner Bros.' Looney Tunes and Merrie Melodies, MGM cartoons such as Tom and Jerry and Droopy, and Fleischer/Famous' Popeye the Sailor. Between cartoons, Rudy, Gogo, and an African American puppet named Jesse B. Weaver (or "Jumpin' J.B." to his friends) would star in short host segments, usually involving floating around in a bizarre colorful spiral and randomly screaming. The show used clips from various Turner-owned films and television series from the 1960s and 1970s for added backdrops and storylines.

== Characters and celebrity guest appearances ==
The show had a quite few minor characters, such as the skeleton puppet Boney Bonerton, voiced by show co-producer Jack Pendarvis. Boney Bonerton would host mini talk shows or game shows, and there would be commercial parodies advertising Boney Bonerton merchandise (i.e. The Boney Bonerton video game or the "Boney Bonerton Just Sings" CD). Also members of the band The Mekons were regulars on the show, Sally Timms played the character Cowboy Sally (from "Wild West Yorkshire"), and Jon Langford played the Olde Salty Sea Biscuit, a pirate who would be shown floating on a canoe in a giant bathroom sink. Other celebrity guest appearances included Jeff Goldblum, Will Smith, and Ed Lover and Doctor Dré from Yo! MTV Raps.

== Variations and film specials ==
Some episodes ran under various titles (such as "Rudy and Gogo 2000", "Rudy y Gogo", and "Taterhole") and TNT also used Rudy and Gogo as hosts for various cult classic film marathon specials, such as "Rudy and Gogo's Thanksgiving Leftover Special" and "Rudy and Gogo's Funtime Movie Parade". The "Rudy and Gogo's New Year's Eve Flaming Cheese Ball" special for New Year's Eve 1995 showed the films The Blob, Queen of Outer Space, House on Haunted Hill, and Thunderbirds Are Go and featured Gogo's surprise announcement for the 1996 US presidential election, as well the anticlimactic dropping of the giant cheese ball at midnight. The "Gogo Para Presidente" campaign jingle became a popular segment of the show.
