= TNT (American TV channel) =

American pay television channel

- Country: United States
- Broadcast area: Nationwide
- Headquarters: Ted Turner Campus, 1050 Techwood Drive, Atlanta, Georgia, U.S.

Programming
- Languages: English; Spanish (via SAP audio track)
- Picture format: 1080i (HDTV) (downscaled to letterboxed 480i for the SDTV feed)

Ownership
- Owner: Warner Bros. Discovery (2022–2026); Skydance (2026–present)
- Parent: Skydance Global Cable Media
- Sister channels: List of assets owned by Skydance

History
- Launched: October 3, 1988; 38 years ago
- Founder: Ted Turner
- Former names: Turner Network Television (1988–1995)

Links
- Webcast: Watch Live (U.S. pay-TV subscribers only; 10 minute free trial)
- Website: tntdrama.com

Availability

Streaming media
- Affiliated streaming service: HBO Max
- Service(s): DirecTV Stream, Hulu + Live TV, Sling TV, YouTube TV

TNT (originally an initialism of Turner Network Television) is an American cable television channel owned by the Skydance Global Cable Media unit of Skydance. Its sister networks are TBS, TruTV and Turner Classic Movies, with the former two also having sports coverage. As of September 2018, TNT was received by approximately 89.573 million households that subscribe to a subscription television service throughout the United States. By June 2023, this number had dropped to 71.2 million households.

The channel was launched on October 3, 1988, with the purpose to air classic films and television series to which Turner Broadcasting System maintained spillover rights through sister channel TBS. In June 2001, the network went through a major shift in its programming and began to focus on drama series and feature films, along with some sporting events (including NHL, U.S. Soccer, the NCAA Division I men's basketball tournament and the professional wrestling show AEW Collision), as TBS shifted its focus to comedic programming.

== History ==
=== Beginnings ===
Prior to the launch of the channel in 1988, the Turner Network Television name had been used by the Turner Broadcasting System for an ad hoc syndication service which produced and distributed various sporting events for carriage on Turner's Atlanta, Georgia, superstation WTBS (channel 17, now WPCH-TV, which was separated from its national cable feed, TBS, in October 2007) as well as broadcast television stations throughout the United States.

The Turner Network Television syndication service launched in 1982 to produce two exhibition games organized by the NFL Players Association (NFLPA) during the NFL strike, which were broadcast on WTBS and its national superstation feed. (The agreement with the NFLPA originally called for 18 games to be broadcast by WTBS on Sunday afternoons and Monday nights during the originally proposed strike season, but was reduced to the exhibition games amid lawsuits filed by the National Football League against Turner Broadcasting and the NFLPA union.) The TNT syndication service also produced and distributed the first Goodwill Games—organized by Ted Turner himself, in response to the Olympic boycotts involving the United States and the Soviet Union of the 1980 and 1984 Summer Olympics—in 1986.

On October 6, 1987, Ted Turner announced the launch of Turner Network Television (TNT)—his fifth basic cable network venture, following SuperStation TBS, CNN, Headline News (now HLN) and the short-lived Cable Music Channel—in a keynote address at the opening day of the Atlantic Cable Show in Atlantic City, New Jersey, stating that the channel would center on major television events. Turner originally estimated that TNT would be offered to cable systems at a monthly rate of 10¢ per subscriber at launch (increasing to 20¢ per subscriber per month by March 1989), with 10 minutes of advertising being carried each hour (three to four minutes of which would be given to prospective cable systems for local advertising). Turner Broadcasting struggled to obtain carriage commitments from various cable providers to commence with the proposed service's launch plans, making TNT's fate uncertain. Turner also entered into preliminary discussions with NBC to purchase a 25% stake in the company, with the prospect of using NBC's financial and programming expertise to get TNT off the ground; however, such discussions terminated by January 1988 without a resolution.

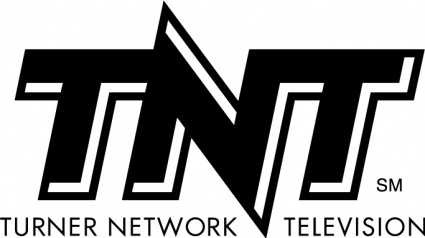
Former logo, used from October 3, 1988, until 1995. A yellow oval background was added in 1992.

By February 1988, Turner had disclosed that TNT's programming would focus on movies from the Metro-Goldwyn-Mayer (MGM) film library—which Turner acquired as a result of his 1986 sale of the MGM film studio to Kirk Kerkorian—and major television events, including made-for-cable movies, high-profile specials, sports events, documentaries and miniseries. Cable systems were given the option of substituting a superstation (other than SuperStation TBS) or other out-of-market television station for TNT upon launch without incurring any copyright liabilities for carriage of the distant signal for the second half of 1988. However, the proposed launch date, originally slated for July 1 of that year, was delayed because it would have presented several issues, including obtaining channel clearances and assembling a programming schedule in such a short time span, and the unfavorability of promoting a service during the summer (when television networks typically programmed reruns). On March 7, Turner Broadcasting System's board of directors unanimously approved Ted Turner's plan for Turner Network Television, with October 3 as the channel's proposed launch date. Plans called for TNT to offer 250 nights of original and live sports programming per year within five years of its debut.

The channel launched at 7:55 p.m. Eastern Time on October 3, 1988, with TNT founder Ted Turner delivering a message about the channel's launch and programming, followed by a pre-recorded performance of "The Star-Spangled Banner", which traditionally played during the launch of a new Turner-owned network. Its inaugural telecast (which followed at 8:00 p.m. Eastern) was the first half of the 1939 classic film Gone with the Wind, a film to which Ted Turner had acquired the rights; the second half aired the following night at the same time (both halves were repeated at 11:00 p.m. Eastern on their respective nights), with the film then being shown in its entirety that Sunday. It was said that Gone with the Wind was chosen as the channel's inaugural program because it was Turner's favorite movie. (Gone with the Wind would also serve as the first program aired on sister channel Turner Classic Movies, when it debuted in April 1994). Incidentally, the film was set and had its premiere held in Atlanta, Turner's hometown and the headquarters of the channel's corporate parent, Turner Broadcasting System.

TNT was initially a vehicle for older movies and television shows to which Turner either already held rights or acquired specifically for the channel; these films made up the majority of TNT's programming during its first six years of operation. The initial schedule also consisted of animated and live-action children's programs (airing Sunday through Fridays from 7:00 to 9:00 a.m. Eastern Time and Monday through Saturdays from 6:00 to 8:00 p.m. Eastern Time), with western series on Saturday mornings and a limited schedule of other classic television series in select other time periods. In its early years, TNT caused controversy among film critics and fans for its airings of colorized versions of many classics that were originally filmed in black-and-white.

The channel launched with an estimated 17 million subscribers, its initial coverage totaling 6.8 times that of the largest previous cable network launch (VH1, which launched on January 1, 1985, with 2.5 million homes estimated to have initially received that channel). The channel's operations were based inside office space at Turner Broadcasting's Techwood Drive complex in midtown Atlanta that formerly served as the facilities for CNN Headline News from its launch as CNN2 in January 1982 until it and parent network CNN moved their operations into the CNN Center downtown in 1987. Turner Entertainment Networks president Gerald Hogan stated around the time of its launch that TNT would eventually become "the first cable network to directly challenge the three broadcast networks", through the production of original programming that would be of "a quality level equal to and [..] significantly better" than programs carried on the major American broadcast television networks; as such, the channel slowly began to add original programming and newer reruns within two years of its launch. The channel debuted its first original made-for-TV film on March 8, 1989, when TNT premiered Nightbreaker, an Arms Race-era drama starring Martin Sheen (who also co-produced the film) and Emilio Estevez.

=== Expansion ===
Former logo, used from 1995, until June 12, 2001

In September 1995, TNT debuted WCW Monday Nitro, which assumed the distinction as the flagship program of the now-defunct World Championship Wrestling (WCW) from WCW Saturday Night, ran on TBS until 2000. At one point, Monday Nitro was regularly the highest-rated weekly program on cable television. Monday Nitro beat Monday Night Raw, the flagship show of the World Wrestling Federation (WWF; now the WWE or World Wrestling Entertainment), in the ratings for 83 consecutive weeks from 1996 to 1998. However, by early 1999, Monday Nitro began to lose viewers to Raw, which became the highest-rated wrestling program on television due to its use of more adult-like storylines. On March 23, 2001, the WWF acquired most of the assets of WCW, which had been up for sale since late 2000; Monday Nitro aired its last episode three days later.

On September 22, 1995, Time Warner Entertainment—a New York City-based media company formed in 1989 through the merger of Time Inc. and Warner Bros. corporate parent Warner Communications—reached an agreement to acquire the Turner Broadcasting System and its associated properties (including TNT, TBS, CNN, Headline News and Cartoon Network as well as Turner Entertainment) for $7.5 billion; the deal would also expand Time Warner Entertainment's pay television holdings, as it had owned HBO and sister premium service Cinemax as well as cable television provider Time Warner Cable since the Time-Warner Communications merger six years prior. (Time Warner and predecessor Warner Communications had owned an 18% interest in Turner Broadcasting since 1987, as part of a cable television industry-backed bailout of the company amid severe financial issues.) Under the terms, Turner would acquire an approximate 10% interest in Time Warner Entertainment as well as oversee its subscription network group—comprising the Turner and Home Box Office units and its minority interests in Comedy Central and E!—and hold a position on the company's board of directors (which he retained until he stepped down from the company in February 2006) upon the merger's closure. The merger received regulatory approval on September 12, 1996; the Turner–Time Warner deal was finalized one month later on October 10, forming what at the time was the largest media company in the world.

The channel was also known for its late night programming. One such program was MonsterVision, a Saturday night B movie showcase that aired from 1991 to 2000. Often the series had special themes, such as "Godzilla Bash '94", an all-day marathon of movies from the Godzilla franchise. Penn & Teller served as occasional guest hosts during its early years; and in 1996, MonsterVision found a permanent host in cult personality and drive-in movie aficionado Joe Bob Briggs, who hosted a pair of more contemporary horror films each week, such as Friday the 13th Part 2 and Wes Craven's New Nightmare. During the wraparound segments within each film, Briggs provided a running commentary, trivia, off-color jokes, and a drive-in total, as well as jokes at the expense of TNT's Standards & Practices department regarding the heavy censorship of the featured movies. This running joke culminated in a Friday the 13th all-night Halloween marathon in 1998, where it was implied that Ted Turner was out to kill him.

Into the 1990s, TNT continued to air cartoons from the Turner library, such as The Flintstones, Scooby-Doo, Dexter's Laboratory, and The Real Adventures of Jonny Quest as part of a daily block called TNT Toons; the DePatie-Freleng Pink Panther cartoons were also featured. The Rudy and Gogo World Famous Cartoon Show, which ran from 1995 to 1997, was an original children's program on the channel featuring Warner Bros., MGM, and Popeye shorts, hosted by a titular pair of a marionette and a nanny goat. In January 1996, the channel began scaling back its children's programming amid competition in that market from Nickelodeon and Turner-owned sister channel Cartoon Network; at that time, TNT discontinued its late-afternoon block of animated series in favor of airing acquired drama series such as Starsky & Hutch and In the Heat of the Night. In 1998, TNT dropped all of its remaining cartoons, relegating those shows to Cartoon Network. Most of the animated series and shorts that were dropped would also serve as the core of Boomerang, a subscription channel devoted to classic cartoons that launched on April 1, 2000.

During the 1990s, TNT scheduled a weekday afternoon block that included Due South, Kung Fu: The Legend Continues, Lois & Clark: The New Adventures of Superman and Babylon 5. In 1998, TNT made efforts to increase its original programming, bumping its production budget by 146%, with programming production costs running in the range of $175 million to $200 million by 2000. That year, TNT took over production of the fifth and final season of Babylon 5 from the Prime Time Entertainment Network after the ad hoc syndication block ceased operations. The following year, TNT produced the Babylon 5 spinoff series Crusade, which was canceled after 13 episodes, as TNT management decided that science fiction did not fit the channel's brand identity. In 2001, TNT debuted what became its most successful original series at the time, Witchblade, which ran for two seasons, ending in 2002.

=== Shift towards drama ===
Former TNT logo, used from June 12, 2001, to January 29, 2016. The current logo is loosely based on this design.

On June 12, 2001, TNT underwent an extensive rebrand, with the introduction of a new logo designed by Trollbäck + Company as well as a new slogan, "We Know Drama", a repositioning of TNT that Bradley Siegel, then-president of Turner Entertainment Networks, explained had emerged through extensive focus group research with frequent TNT viewers. The slogan emphasized the channel's new focus on dramatic programming, including sports and off-network syndicated dramas such as Law & Order, NYPD Blue, ER and Judging Amy.

On January 1, 2003, TNT launched a substitute feed called TNT Plus, although it does not appear this was ever reflected in the channel's on-air identity. The apparent sole purpose of its establishment was to force renegotiations with subscription providers to increase carriage fees—with some multiple system operators suggesting that Turner was seeking a 10% increase in subscriber fees for the channel—to help pay for TNT's new NBA and NASCAR contracts well before the channel's distribution agreements with providers were scheduled to come up for renewal. In theory, TNT Plus was to have been the sole carrier of Turner's NBA and NASCAR coverage from that point forward, while any providers still carrying the original TNT would have seen replacement programming instead. Although it appears that Comcast did not immediately sign on to carry TNT Plus, there is no evidence that Turner had actually pulled its sports programming from the "original" TNT.

On December 7, 2008, TNT unveiled an update to its logo, displaying it mainly in a silver or sometimes gold beveling. The "We know drama" tagline remained, but the channel added more of a focus on its original series and announced plans to carry three nights of original programming a week during primetime, starting in 2009. In 2012, TNT rebranded itself with a new slogan: "Drama, Period." (visually displayed as "Drama.", with the TNT logo serving as the period symbol), and different logo colors keyed to the theme of the show being presented.

On May 14, 2014, TNT introduced a new slogan, "TNT Drama. Boom.", part of a branding campaign reflecting the channel adding more action-adventure, sci-fi, fantasy, mystery, suspense series to its slate of crime dramas. TNT purchased subscription-television rights in September for the next five Marvel Studios films starting with Avengers: Age of Ultron. In 2016, TNT changed its logo after 15 years.

=== AT&T ownership ===
On October 22, 2016, AT&T announced an offer to acquire Time Warner for $108.7 billion, including debt it would assume from the latter; the merger would bring Time Warner's various media properties, including TBS, under the same corporate umbrella as AT&T's telecommunications holdings, including satellite provider DirecTV. Time Warner shareholders approved the merger on February 15, 2017; however, on February 28, FCC Chairman Ajit Pai announced that his agency will not review the deal, leaving the review to the U.S. Department of Justice. On November 20, 2017, the Justice Department filed a lawsuit against AT&T and Time Warner in an attempt to block the merger, citing antitrust concerns surrounding the transaction. The proposed merger—which had already been approved by the European Commission and Mexican, Chilean and Brazilian regulatory authorities—was affirmed by court ruling on June 12, 2018, after District of Columbia U.S. District Court Judge Richard J. Leon ruled in favor of AT&T, dismissing the DOJ's antitrust claims in the lawsuit. The merger closed two days later on June 14, with the company becoming a wholly owned subsidiary of AT&T under the renamed parent company WarnerMedia. The U.S. Court of Appeals in Washington unanimously upheld the lower court's ruling in favor of AT&T on February 26, 2019.

On March 4, 2019, WarnerMedia underwent a major reorganization of its broadcasting assets, in which Turner Broadcasting would effectively be dissolved, and WarnerMedia's television properties would be divided among three divisions within the WarnerMedia umbrella, with TNT, along with TBS, truTV and HBO being reassigned to WarnerMedia Entertainment, chaired by Bob Greenblatt. AT&T did not specify any timetable for the changes to take effect, although WarnerMedia had begun to remove all Turner references in corporate communications and press releases, referring to that unit's networks as "divisions of WarnerMedia."

On May 15, 2019, upstart promotion All Elite Wrestling (AEW) and WarnerMedia announced a broadcasting agreement to offer a weekly prime-time wrestling program on TNT—later named AEW Dynamite, which premiered on October 2, 2019, as AEW's flagship program—marking TNT's re-entry into the professional wrestling scene following the aforementioned closure of WCW eighteen years prior. On August 13, 2021, AEW premiered a second weekly program on TNT—Rampage—which aired on Friday nights until December 2024. In January 2022, Dynamite moved to TBS, with Rampage remaining on TNT. AEW would add a third weekly program, that being Collision, on June 17, 2023; Collision airs mostly on Saturday nights on TNT.

=== Warner Bros. Discovery ownership ===
On April 8, 2022, WarnerMedia was divested by AT&T and merged with Discovery Inc. to form Warner Bros. Discovery (WBD). On April 26, it was reported that WBD had suspended original scripted series development at TBS and TNT in order to evaluate the channels' strategies moving forward. At this point, TNT only had two original scripted series still airing first-run episodes, Animal Kingdom and Snowpiercer, both of which are preparing for their final seasons. On May 11, Brett Weitz was removed as general manager for TBS, TNT, and TruTV; the channels are now overseen by Kathleen Finch as head of U.S. Networks.

On December 5, 2025, Netflix announced its intent to acquire Warner Bros. Discovery for $82.7 billion. The deal would include the Warner Bros. film, game and television studios, DC Entertainment/DC Studios, HBO/HBO Max and their respective libraries. TNT, along with the rest of the company's linear networks and the Discovery+ streaming service was to be excluded from the acquisition, and was to be spun off into a publicly traded company named Discovery Global. Paramount Skydance would later launch a (later rejected) hostile takeover bid for the entirety of WBD three days later for an enterprise value of $108.4 billion.

On December 17, 2025, Starz Entertainment (in which also plans to acquire A+E Global Media, a joint venture between The Walt Disney Company and Hearst Communications) submitted a $25 billion bid to acquire Warner Bros. Discovery's Global Linear Networks division, which includes cable networks and brands such as TNT along with CNN, TBS, Cartoon Network, and the Discovery-owned networks including Discovery Channel, TLC, HGTV, Food Network, and more. However, the deal was rejected, due to Paramount Skydance initiating a definitive agreement to buy WBD on February 27, 2026.

== High-definition feed ==
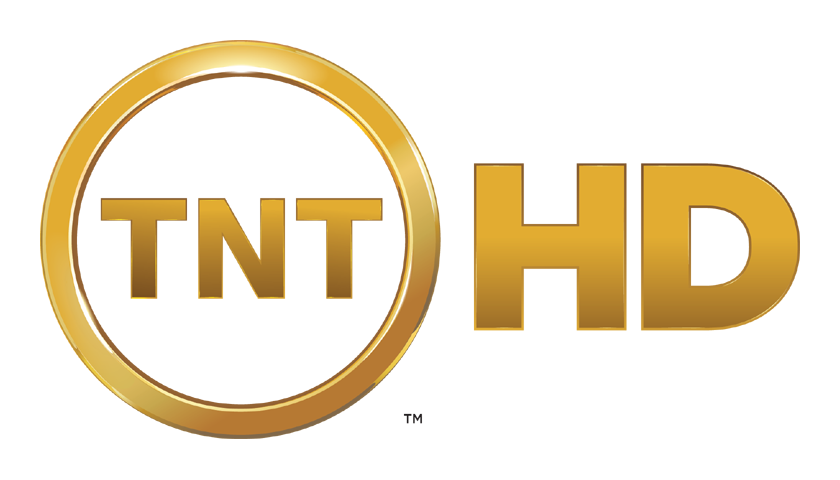
TNT HD logo, used from 2008 to 2016.

TNT HD is a high definition simulcast feed of TNT, which broadcasts at a picture resolution of 1080i; the HD feed launched on May 21, 2004, coinciding with its broadcast of game 1 of the 2004 NBA Western Conference finals between the Los Angeles Lakers and the Minnesota Timberwolves.

TNT was criticized for its practice of initially airing a significant amount of 4:3 standard-definition content stretched to 16:9 on its HD feed, using a nonlinear process similar to the "panorama" setting on many HDTVs that some viewers nicknamed Stretch-o-Vision.

== Programming ==
Ever since 2001, TNT currently airs a mix of original drama and reality series, and reruns of dramas that originally aired on the major broadcast networks. TNT’s sole original program as of 2025 is The Librarians: The Next Chapter. The channel's daytime, overnight and Saturday morning schedule is heavily dominated by reruns of current and former network police procedural series such as Castle, Bones and TNT mainstay Law & Order, while its weekday morning schedule focuses on sci-fi, supernatural and fantasy series, with Charmed being the longest drama aired on TNT as of now, airing reruns since 2001.

=== Movies ===
Feature films have been a mainstay of TNT since its inception. TNT maintains film licensing agreements with sister company Warner Bros. Entertainment Inc. (primarily releases from Warner Bros. Pictures and New Line Cinema), The Walt Disney Studios (primarily releases from Walt Disney Pictures (live-action only), Touchstone Pictures, Hollywood Pictures, Marvel Studios, Lucasfilm and 20th Century Studios), Columbia Pictures, Universal Pictures, Paramount Pictures, Lionsgate Studios (mostly blockbuster films, primarily releases from Lionsgate Films and Summit Entertainment) and STX Entertainment.

In 1989, Turner Broadcasting System launched its film production unit, Turner Pictures, to act as a primary supplier for original films made for TNT, but the venture shifted out of TNT and expand into theatrical films before folding the unit into Warner Bros. Pictures in 1996.

Since the launch of Turner Classic Movies, TNT's film lineup has shifted away from classic films outside of special airings of films such as The Wizard of Oz (which has been aired recently since 2014) in December many times in a row on certain days every year either before or close to Christmas time. The Wizard of Oz had also used to be aired on TNT in the past for several years in November close to Thanksgiving time a few times in a row on certain days every year too. Now in favor of more recent films released from the 1980s onward, with an emphasis on films released after 1995. Presently, most of the films broadcast on TNT are of the drama and action genres, however some comedy films continue to air on the channel periodically. Films generally air on the channel during the overnight hours on most nights and for much of the day on weekends. Each weekend, TNT airs a film in primetime with limited commercial interruption, branded in on-air promos under the title "More Movies, Less Commercials."

Beginning in 1997, TNT broadcast a 24-hour marathon of the 1983 comedy film A Christmas Story from the evening of Christmas Eve to the evening of Christmas Day. The marathon also runs on its sister channel TBS beginning in 2004, when the annual event became exclusive to that channel and it still does now along with TNT airing it again at the same time starting in 2014 together on both networks. Beginning one hour early on TBS, one hour later on TNT and ending one hour early on TBS and one hour later on TNT.

=== Sports programming ===
==== National Basketball Association ====
In July 1989, the Turner Broadcasting System announced that TNT would obtain partial pay television rights to the National Basketball Association (NBA) beginning with the 1989–90 season, as part of a transference of TBS SuperStation's existing NBA telecast rights. As a result, TNT's NBA coverage would consist of games involving other teams within the league, with TBS's rights being scaled back to only encompass game telecasts involving the franchise serving its parent television station WTBS's home market, the Atlanta Hawks (which Ted Turner had purchased from Atlanta-based real estate developer Tom Cousins in 1977). Under the initial agreement and a subsequent five-year contract signed in December 1989, TNT carried about 50 regular season and 25 playoff games during the inaugural season of its contractual rights. (TBS SuperStation/WTBS, in acquiring exclusivity for the Hawks, expanded its schedule to include 25 away games through the acquisition of Atlanta rival WGNX [now independent channel WANF]'s partial Hawks telecast rights.)

In the early 1990s, some Hawks game telecasts shown on TNT and TBS were blacked out within 35 miles of the home team's arena. This restriction was dropped in 2000, allowing TNT the right to be the exclusive broadcaster of any game it chose to carry. TNT had regularly broadcast NBA games on multiple Tuesday nights until the 2002–03 season and again since 2021. The weekly telecasts were then moved to Thursday nights in 2003–04 season until 2021 in which it moved back to Tuesday nights, when TBS was opted out of rights to NBA coverage as a result of the league's contract renewal with Turner Sports. In addition to carrying NBA regular season games, which typically air as a doubleheader on most weeks, TNT also airs opening night games, the NBA All-Star Game, and the vast majority of games within the conference playoffs and one of the Conference finals (the Eastern Conference finals in odd-number years and the Western Conference finals in even-numbered years). From 2015 to 2025, the All-Star Game has been simulcast on TBS to prevent it from counterprogramming TNT, although in 2022 TBS experimented with an alternate broadcast of the game featuring the panel of TNT's studio show Inside the NBA. In July 2024, TNT Sports announced they would be ending their deal to broadcast the NBA after 36 years, with the rights headed to NBC and Prime Video.

==== National Hockey League ====
Beginning in the 2021–22 NHL season, Turner Sports holds rights to the National Hockey League (NHL); the contract includes rights to up to 72 exclusive regular season games per-season on TNT, predominantly consisting of Wednesday night doubleheaders. TNT also splits coverage of the Stanley Cup Playoffs with fellow rightsholder ESPN, and will hold exclusive rights to the Stanley Cup Final in odd-numbered years.

==== College basketball ====
In 2011, TNT obtained a share in the television rights to the NCAA Men's Division I Basketball Championship as part of a comprehensive broadcast rights deal known as NCAA March Madness. The deal also involves CBS and fellow Turner properties TBS and TruTV. During even-numbered years, Turner holds exclusive rights to the Final Four-onward; until 2022, TNT and TruTV aired alternate broadcasts of the games tailored towards the participating teams, but this was quietly discontinued in 2022, with all three channels simulcasting the TBS broadcast.

==== Golf ====
TNT televised the PGA Championship, carrying full coverage of the first two rounds and early coverage of the weekend rounds. The rights were held from 1999 to 2019, when the contract with the PGA of America ended—after which ESPN assumed the rights. TNT's golf coverage has since been limited to The Match—a series of charity match play events organized by Turner Sports that are simulcast across the Turner channels.

In 2003, TNT took over the rights to broadcast the Thursday and Friday rounds of The Open Championship, as well as the rights to weekday rounds of the Women's British Open and Senior British Open. ESPN assumed the Open Championship rights in 2009. From 2000 to 2007, TNT also carried the biennial PGA Tour-managed Presidents Cup. The television rights were assumed by Golf Channel beginning with the 2009 event until the 2019 event as part of its overall cable television deal with the PGA Tour, from the 2020 event and on those rights were transferred back to ESPN.

==== UEFA Champions League ====
Beginning in the 2018–19 season, Turner Sports held the rights to the UEFA Champions League and Europa League, the two highest levels of European club competition, under a three-year deal. 46 Champions League matches and the finals of both competitions (as well as the UEFA Super Cup) are aired per-season on TNT, with the remainder streaming on B/R Live—a newly created streaming service run by its sister sports news website Bleacher Report. In June 2020, Turner Sports announced they would be ending their deal to broadcast the UEFA Champions League a year early with those rights headed to future rights partner CBS Sports.

==== Major League Baseball (overflow) ====
TNT carries limited playoff coverage from MLB on TBS, but only in rare exceptions where a long-running or extra innings game forces a bump over in coverage of the newer game temporarily from TBS to TNT until the earlier game's conclusion, when the coverage on TNT ends at the conclusion of the current half-inning and the game moves fully to TBS (due to this, TNT's schedule in early-to-mid October is usually made up of little original content). In the 2011 and 2012 playoffs, it carried seven pre-scheduled Division Series games in full before Major League Baseball decided to use MLB Network in future years in a shift of scheduling to allow more night game carriage.

==== NASCAR ====
In 2001, TNT began presenting NASCAR coverage, as part of NASCAR's first unified television rights deal (where television rights were centralized with the association itself, rather than brokered directly by each track owner). The broadcasts were a successor to TBS's past NASCAR broadcasts and originally intended to be carried by TBS, but ultimately assigned to TNT in support of its new brand positioning. TNT's coverage was initially a co-production with NBC Sports, serving as the cable partner for NBC's broadcast television coverage of NASCAR. Under the contract, TNT held the cable rights for the second half of the Winston Cup Series and Busch Series seasons, carrying races not aired by NBC; the broadcasts shared their on-air production and talent with NBC's broadcasts.

When the contract expired in 2006, NBC declined to bid on the next package. TNT would join Fox and new rightsholder ESPN as part of the next round of broadcast rights, retaining a smaller package of six mid-season Nextel Cup Series races per-season, beginning with Daytona's July race (by then known as the Coke Zero 400)—which became exclusive to TNT under the new contract; previously, NBC and TNT held rights to the race in odd-numbered years, alternating with Fox (which carried the race in even numbered years; contrarily, the network not carrying the 400 would carry the Daytona 500). The contract lasted through the 2014 season, after which NASCAR returned to splitting its media rights between Fox and NBC. NASCAR returned to TNT in 2025 for five mid-season NASCAR Cup Series races, with NASCAR holding an in-season tournament during these 5 races not too dissimilar to the NBA Cup.

==== National Football League ====
In 1990, TNT obtained partial television rights to the NFL's Sunday Night Football package in a comprehensive agreement in which games were split with ESPN. The NFL on TNT consisted of three or four preseason game broadcasts and telecasts of regular season games during the first half of each season until 1997. Abiding by NFL broadcasting rules, TNT distributed its game telecasts to broadcast television stations in the local markets of the teams playing in that week's game.

== International ==
European, Middle Eastern, African, Australian, Latin American and Asian versions of TNT were launched in the middle of 1990s, which were exclusively dedicated to movies, mainly from the MGM and Warner Bros. archives (however, the UK, Scandinavian, and Australian versions of TNT all broadcast WCW Monday Nitro (the UK and Scandinavian versions broadcast the show on Friday nights on a four-day delay from its American broadcast), and the Latin American version aired a children's block called "Magic Box"). The European, Australian and Asian versions of TNT shared channel space with Cartoon Network, while the Latin American version shared space with CNN International. The Europe, Middle East and Africa, Asia-Pacific TNT channels were eventually relaunched as Turner Classic Movies, while the Latin American version retained the TNT branding. The most well-known TNT channel in Canada, Latin America, Europe, Middle East and Africa, Asia-Pacific was (and still is) the French version, which used similar graphics to what the flagship American channel was using at the time.

=== Canada ===
No version or feed for TNT exists in Canada though some of its programming is aired on Bell Media channels such as CTV Drama Channel and TSN.

=== Latin America ===
Regional versions of TNT were launched in Latin America in 1991; the channel mostly shows films, along with a few series. All programs used to be presented subbed in Spanish and Portuguese, until 2015, when the channel reverted it and made available the dubs; however, the channel also offers closed captions (which can be removed or placed by the user) on digital operators. TNT Latin America and TNT Brazil began operating high definition simulcast feeds in 2009. In Latin America, TNT broadcasts all of the high-profile award shows including the Academy Awards, the Emmy Awards, and the Grammy Awards.

Feeds

- TNT Mexico
- TNT Colombia
- TNT Central America/Venezuela/Caribe
- TNT Chile/Peru/Ecuador/Bolivia
  - TNT Chile
- TNT Argentina/Paraguay/Uruguay
  - TNT Argentina

=== Germany ===
In January 2009, a version of TNT launched in Germany as TNT Serie. The channel shows a wide variety of older and recent American drama and comedy programs (such as 30 Rock, Murder, She Wrote, Monk, Six Feet Under, Seinfeld, ER, The King of Queens, Everybody Loves Raymond, Boardwalk Empire, Game of Thrones and Falling Skies). TNT Serie maintains two audio channels: one with the original English language audio track and one with a German-dubbed soundtrack. In June 2009, the German version of TCM was relaunched as TNT Film. TNT also has a comedy channel which shows 2 Broke Girls, Two and a Half Men and The Big Bang Theory. TNT Comedy also maintains two audio channels: TNT Serie, TNT Comedy and TNT Film both launched high definition simulcast feeds in the fall of 2010. On June 14, 2021, it was announced that TNT would be rebranding their channels into Warner TV from September 25, 2021.

=== Spain ===
The TNT brand returned to the Spanish market in the summer of 2007, when it launched exclusively on the pay television platform Digital+. As of 2012, TNT is available on several subscription providers in Spain. TNT España is divided into two blocks: one exclusively carrying movies and another exclusively carrying television series (such as The Vampire Diaries, The Big Bang Theory, Two and a Half Men, Falling Skies and Sherlock). In 2019, TNT España aired the first series they commissioned locally in Spain, Vota Juan. The channel was rebranded as Warner TV on April 14, 2023, discontinuing the TNT brand as an entertainment channel in Europe in the process.

=== Turkey ===
A local version of TNT in Turkey launched on March 3, 2008, by Doğan Media Group as a channel focusing on feature films. Foreign television series and movies were eventually added to the channel's schedule. On January 24, 2011, it was relaunched as a general entertainment channel with the addition of new television series to its lineup. In 2012, TNT was rebranded as TV2.

=== Scandinavia ===
The Scandinavian TNT channel was originally launched by tabloid newspaper Aftonbladet as "Aftonbladet TV7" on October 9, 2006. Aftonbladet sold the channel in late 2007. In August 2008, it was sold once again to NonStop Television. On March 2, 2011, the channel was relaunched as TNT7, following the Turner Broadcasting System's purchase of NonStop Television owner Millennium Media Group. On March 21, 2012, the channel was renamed TNT, dropping the "7" from the name.

=== Netherlands and Flanders ===
On April 10, 2012, TNT HD Benelux launched in Belgium, carried exclusively on Telenet. The first month of the service was offered to consumers for free, with a subscription required thereafter to view the channel. TNT HD Benelux offers a mix of comedies, movies and current television series (such as Falling Skies, Shameless and Memphis Beat), as well as reruns of older series (such as ER, The West Wing and Smallville). The channel launched in the Netherlands on January 24, 2013. It was later launched on SNOW and Belgacom TV in Belgium; however it stopped broadcasting in both countries on January 1, 2014.

=== Poland ===
The Polish version of TNT was launched as Turner Classic Movies (TCM) on June 1, 1998, replacing the European version of TNT, Classic Movies. It relaunched in both SD and HD on October 6, 2015. On July 8, 2021, it was announced that the channel would rebrand into Warner TV from October 23.

=== Romania ===
The European version of TNT was launched for first time in Romania on September 17, 1993, with Cartoon Network, until October 15, 1999, when it was replaced with Turner Classic Movies. In 2007, TCM was localized in Romania, the Romanian version was launched and it was made a 24/7 channel. On some carriers, Cartoon Network and TCM were shared (the last carrier who maintained them shared was RDS-RCS, from launch of European version to October 20, 2017). On October 6, 2015, TCM was replaced by TNT, 22 years after the first launch. On July 8, 2021, it was announced that the channel would rebrand into Warner TV from October 23.

=== Africa ===
The African version of TNT launched on October 15, 1995. On October 15, 1999, TNT was replaced with Turner Classic Movies. On September 21, 2018, 23 years after the first relaunch, TNT replaced the African version of TCM.

=== Thailand ===
Launched in 2016, it replaced Toonami Thailand. Owned by M Turner Company (a joint-venture with Major Kantana Co., Ltd.), the channel was closed on January 1, 2018.

=== United Kingdom ===
In September 1993, Turner Broadcasting System Europe launched a service through the Astra 1C satellite in a majority of European territories consisting of a Cartoon Network strand that aired between 5:00 am to 7:00 pm, and a a TNT channel that aired from 7:00 pm to 5:00 am. This was after the service was previously announced in March.

Known as TNT Classic Movies, it aired much of Turner's movie archive, mainly those from the pre-1986 MGM and pre-1949 Warner Bros. catalogues. It was later launched in other CEE, MENA and Nordic territories, in five additional languages. The UK version would later opt out of the existing European feed when WCW programmes began airing on the channel in 1996.

By 1996, it was available in 31 million homes in over 33 territories. In August, the service was slightly reduced to begin airing at 9:00 pm to expand Cartoon Network's broadcast space. By the end of the year, a 24-hour version of TNT Classic Movies was made available through digital cable providers, with the UK getting it beginning in 1997.

In October 1999, Cartoon Network Europe split off to focus exclusively on the UK and Ireland markets, becoming an encrypted service. The change was to allow TNT Classic Movies to rebrand as Turner Classic Movies in all territories aside from its UK and Irish analogue feed, for which a standalone TNT network would be in its place. The new version of TNT was a general entertainment network that showed drama, films and sport, with WCW wrestling content airing on Fridays. The new version of TNT broadcasts daily from 9:00 pm–1:00 am.

In April 2000, Turner announced that TNT would cease operations on 30 June and replace it on analogue satellite and cable with Turner Classic Movies, certifying a "oversaturated market" as the reason. Turner Classic Movies took over its former space on Analogue satellite and some cable providers on 1 July, and was removed entirely on platforms that already broadcast the network.

The TNT brand returned to the UK after more than two decades on July 18, 2023, with the rebranding of the BT Sport channel network as TNT Sports, following the establishment of a joint-venture between BT Group and Warner Bros. Discovery to take charge of the channels previously wholly owned by BT. The Eurosport channels' UK operations were shut down at the end of January 2025 and folded into TNT Sports' operations.
