= Boomerang (TV network) =

American cable television network

- Logo used since January 19, 2015
- Country: United States
- Broadcast area: Nationwide
- Network: Cartoon Network (1992–2004)
- Headquarters: Atlanta, Georgia, U.S.

Programming
- Languages: English; Spanish (with SAP; a Spanish language simulcast of the channel is also available)
- Picture format: 720p HDTV (downscaled to letterboxed 480i for the SDTV feed)

Ownership
- Owner: Skydance
- Parent: The Cartoon Network, Inc.
- Key people: Michael Ouweleen (president, The Cartoon Network, Inc.)
- Sister channels: List: Adult Swim; Cartoon Network; Cartoonito; Discovery Familia; Discovery Family

History
- Launched: December 8, 1992; 33 years ago (block); April 1, 2000; 26 years ago (channel); April 11, 2017; 9 years ago (streaming service)
- Closed: October 3, 2004; 22 years ago (block); September 30, 2024; 2 years ago (streaming service)
- Former names: Boomerang from Cartoon Network (2000–2015)

Availability

Streaming media
- Internet Protocol television: DirecTV Stream, Hulu + Live TV, Sling TV

Boomerang is an American cable television network owned by the Global Linear Networks division of Skydance. The network primarily broadcasts animated programming from the Warner Bros. Animation library, including Warner Bros. Cartoons and Hanna-Barbera productions among others.

Boomerang debuted in 1992 as a programming block on Cartoon Network dedicated to classic animation. The block eventually spun-off into its own separate network in 2000, and by the late 2000s, began airing more modern and contemporary programming, including reruns of Cartoon Network original series. A 2015 relaunch aimed to promote Boomerang as a "second flagship" brand alongside Cartoon Network, and saw the network produce its own original programming, with a focus on contemporary reboots of franchises such as Looney Tunes and Scooby-Doo. In 2017, as the cable network lost coverage, Boomerang launched a standalone SVOD over-the-top streaming service, which operated until 2024.

As of November 2023, Boomerang is available to approximately 26 million pay television households in the United States — down from its peak of 47 million households in 2019.

== History ==
=== Background and early years ===
Former Boomerang logo, used from April 1, 2000, to January 19, 2015

Turner Broadcasting had built up an extensive catalogue of classic animation throughout the 1980s and beyond, most notably from Ted Turner's short-lived acquisition of Metro-Goldwyn-Mayer in 1986 and its acquisition of Hanna-Barbera Productions in 1991. This library – consisting of Hanna-Barbera cartoons originally produced for Saturday mornings, theatrical Warner Bros. (pre-1948) and MGM cartoons, and the Paramount-produced Popeye the Sailor shorts – was first showcased in dedicated children's programming blocks on TBS and TNT, before migrating to Cartoon Network upon its launch in October 1992.

Two months later, on December 8, Cartoon Network introduced a programming block known as Boomerang. The name carried a double meaning, referring to its purpose as a showcase for older, lesser-known Hanna-Barbera series, as well as the block's target audience of baby boomers, who grew up watching said series during the 1960s and 1970s. Each week, the Boomerang block devoted its lineup to cartoons produced during and prior to a certain year (e.g., 1969 featuring series such as Scooby-Doo, Where Are You! and Dastardly and Muttley in Their Flying Machines).

Eventually, following shifts in scheduling for the block and Cartoon Network's increased investments in original programming, Turner launched a standalone Boomerang channel on April 1, 2000. The Cartoon Network block continued to air until October 3, 2004, by which point all remaining classic cartoons (save for Tom and Jerry and various Scooby-Doo series) migrated to the Boomerang channel.

From Boomerang's launch until January 17, 2005, the channel ran its programming in eight-hour blocks that repeated three times a day starting at 8:00 a.m. Eastern Time. Mondays through Thursdays featured regular half-hour and hour-long series, Fridays were dedicated to 24-hour "monthly marathons" of a particular character (a format later reused for the Boomeroyalty block introduced in 2007, by which point it shifted to airing weekends from 2:00 to 4:00 p.m. Eastern Time), Saturdays continued to air cartoons from a certain calendar year, and Sundays were devoted to action-adventure cartoons under the Boomeraction banner.

=== Relaunch ===
On February 4, 2014, during Turner's upfront presentations, it was announced that Boomerang would become an advertising-supported network, and that there were plans to realign the brand globally across its international feeds. A new branding style was introduced in late September for Latin America, before arriving in the United States on January 19, 2015. As part of the relaunch, Boomerang would introduce original programming for the first time, particularly focusing on the most well-known franchises from the Warner archives, while reformatting its schedule with family co-viewing in mind. Turner executives described the changes as an effort to grow Boomerang into a "second flagship" on par with the Cartoon Network.

On March 7, 2017, Boomerang announced the launch of a branded SVOD streaming service, featuring over 5,000 titles from Hanna-Barbera and Warner Bros. Entertainment as well as exclusive original programming. The service launched on April 11, 2017, and was available for either for $4.99 per month or $39.99 annually. New episodes and content were planned to be added to the service on a weekly basis.

On November 13, 2018, Boomerang launched a channel on the VRV streaming service. That same year, the 3rd Annual Shorty Social Good Awards nominated Boomerang and the Captain Planet Foundation for "Best in Entertainment".

In August 2024, Warner Bros. Discovery announced it would be shutting down the standalone Boomerang service on September 30. Select content from the app moved to the Max streaming service and remaining Boomerang subscribers were converted to the app's ad-free plan.

== Programming ==
Boomerang currently airs a mix of classic cartoons and contemporary re-imaginings of franchises from the Warner Bros. animation library, as well as reruns and occasional simulcasts of programming aired on Cartoon Network. It has also been used to burn off programs from Cartoon Network. As part of its 2015 relaunch, Boomerang previously aired original programs from Warner Bros. Animation, including New Looney Tunes (originally titled Wabbit), Be Cool, Scooby-Doo!, and an animated adaptation of Bunnicula.

=== Programming history ===
Boomerang avoided channel drift for much of its existence due to its existence stemming from Cartoon Network's own channel drift, continuing to emphasize programs from the breadth of the Warner Bros. archives while adding newer content to its library over the years. By June 2014, however, most archival series had been relegated to graveyard slots while the daytime schedule became dominated by series produced from the 1990s onward. Since then, the policy has evolved: it prioritised 2010s programming in April 2017, intermittently aired older series between 2018 and 2024, and reinstated classic cartoons to the daytime schedule in 2023. Various entries in the Tom and Jerry, Looney Tunes, and Scooby-Doo franchises have maintained a consistent presence on the schedule since the 2015 rebrand, while previous mainstays such as The Flintstones, The Jetsons, and The Smurfs have periodically rejoined, only to be removed from rotation later on.

Not all of the Warner animation library is exclusive to Boomerang. Sister network Discovery Family, during its era as the separately-owned Hub Network, has broadcast portions of the catalog that includes series produced in collaboration with Steven Spielberg's Amblin Entertainment (such as Tiny Toon Adventures and Animaniacs) and most works involving Batman and Superman (such as the DC Animated Universe), and has expanded the number of Warner offerings on its lineup following the formation of Warner Bros. Discovery in 2022. In addition, Warner's collection of Christmas specials (including the latter half of the Rankin/Bass library) is licensed to AMC's Best Christmas Ever block as of 2018, after previously airing on Freeform and its predecessors for nearly 20 years as part of the 25 Days of Christmas block. In 2019, former Boomerang mainstay The Flintstones was licensed out to Weigel Broadcasting's MeTV, which later introduced weekday and Saturday morning blocks featuring Warner content (including Looney Tunes/Merrie Melodies, Popeye, and MGM shorts) in 2021, and partnered with Warner Bros. Discovery to launch spin-off station MeTV Toons in 2024. Boomerang itself occasionally licenses programming from other distributors, such as The Rocky and Bullwinkle Show and Garfield and Friends.

== Availability ==
Boomerang-branded networks and blocks have been launched globally. As part of the brand's 2015 relaunch, these branches were initially aligned as family co-viewing networks. Beginning in 2021, most of these outlets were re-aligned under the preschool-oriented Cartoonito brand (which would have its own relaunch that year).

== See also ==
- Cartoonito
- Tooncast
- Pogo
