= Rebop (TV series) =

- Genre: Children's
- Presented by: LeVar Burton
- Country of origin: United States
- Original language: English

Original release
- Network: PBS
- Release: October 9, 1976 – April 7, 1979

Rebop is an American children's television series that aired from 1976 to 1979 on PBS stations and produced by WGBH Boston. The premise was to promote social understanding and diversity among young people. LeVar Burton hosted for the final season.

Quincy Jones performed the title tune You Have to Do It Yourself.

== Season Overview ==
Season	Episodes	Originally aired (U.S. dates)	
Season	Episodes	First aired	Last aired
1	26	October 9, 1976	April 2, 1977
2	26	October 7, 1978	April 7, 1979

=== Season 1 (1976-1977) ===
- Show 101 (October 9, 1976): Kelly (and the Flying Souls) / Michael Ray / Franco
- Show 102 (October 16, 1976): Charles Graddick / Alex Guerrero / Anne Mao
- Show 103 (October 23, 1976): Walter Lowe/ Cuban Boys Home/ Joetta Cajero
- Show 104 (October 30, 1976): Glenn Templett / Torrance Brown / Myrna Giannoulis
- Show 105 (November 6, 1976): Manuel Gomez, Pham Thanh, Chichi Orange
- Show 106 (November 13, 1976): Celebrado Brothers / Calvin Roberson / Giggles Diaz
- Show 107 (November 20, 1976): Martita / Artney and Todd / Pearl
- Show 108 (November 27, 1976): Marles Flowers / Baez Family / Lorraine
- Show 109 (December 4, 1976): Jessie Guerrero / Pidgeon / Rodney
- Show 110 (December 11, 1976)
- Show 111 (December 18, 1976): Becky (Voeghtley) / Miguel / Pamela
- Show 112 (December 25, 1976): Pito and Dianita / Kwame / Gerry
- Show 113 (January 1, 1977): Felito / Adam / Judy
- Show 114 (January 8, 1977): Kiki / Tara / Greg
- Show 115 (January 15, 1977): Tito/ Lap Chi / Charisse
- Show 116 (January 22, 1977): Alex / Phyllis / Lennie
- Show 117 (January 29, 1977): Keith / Eldin / Carlos
- Show 118 (February 5, 1977): Star / Eddie Marques / Tom Shaffer
- Show 119 (February 12, 1977): Johnny / Tommy / McCrory Family
- Show 120 (February 19, 1977): Eddie / Berta and Carol / Charles White
- Show 121 (February 26, 1977): Freddy / Denise / Susan
- Show 122 (March 5, 1977): Softball / Marc / Joanne
- Show 123 (March 12, 1977): Kiko / Leo / Anson and Dave
- Show 124 (March 19, 1977): Blue Hills / Gee Gee / Marlon
- Show 125 (March 26, 1977): Peter / Kay Kay / Tony
- Show 126 (April 2, 1977): Heidi / Nereida / Freddie and Randy

=== Season 2 (1978-1979) ===
- Show 201 (October 7, 1978) (Preview with LeVar Burton as new series host)
- Show 202 (October 14, 1978): Making It: They Tell Their Stories
- Show 203 (October 21, 1978): Experiences To Learn
- Show 204 (October 28, 1978): Looking Forward To The Future
- Show 205 (November 4, 1978): Cultures To Share
- Show 206 (November 11, 1978): Surrounded By Life
- Show 207 (November 18, 1978): Music
- Show 208 (November 25, 1978): Livin In The City
- Show 209 (December 2, 1978): What It Means To Be A Family
- Show 210 (December 9, 1978): In My School We Don't Have Grades
- Show 211 (December 16, 1978): Gabe and Alice
- Show 212 (December 23, 1978): Holding Their Own
- Show 213 (December 30, 1978): It's Easier When Someone Helps
- Show 214 (January 6, 1979): She Aint Heavy
- Show 215 (January 13, 1979): Speak to Me / Language To Share
- Show 216 (January 20, 1979): Learning To Deal
- Show 217 (January 27, 1979): A Mixed Bag
- Show 218 (February 3, 1979): Finding Their Path
- Show 219 (February 10, 1979): Knowing Who You Are
- Show 220 (February 17, 1979): Moving On Up
- Show 221 (February 24, 1979): Friends
- Show 222 (March 3, 1979): Darlene and Tommy
- Show 223 (March 10, 1979): Taking Aim
- Show 224 (March 17, 1979): Two Named Jose
- Show 225 (March 24, 1979): Heritage
- Show 226 (March 31, 1979): Leaving Home, Going Home
